= Party lists for the 2024 South African election =

Party candidate list for the 2024 South African election

This article displays the various political parties' party candidate lists for the 2024 South African general election.

The National Assembly of South Africa is elected every five years by party-list proportional representation using closed lists.

The lists were first published on 26 March 2024, with the Independent Electoral Commission (IEC) allowing objections to be lodged, pending a final decision on 28 March 2024. In lists available on 27 March 2024, it was noticed that five parties had been removed, without notice from the IEC; Africa Restoration Alliance, All Game Changers, Arise South Africa, Bolsheviks Party of South Africa and Defenders of the People.

Incumbent Members of Parliament standing for re-election are highlighted in bold.

== Hope4SA ==
=== National ===
1. Motsamai John Mathuhle
2. Petrus Andreas Stefanus Strauss
3. Marthinus Gerhardus Human Bester
4. Dianne Francis Rogers
5. Siphiwe Christopher Mathebula
6. Petunia Zandile Mwenda
7. Aloisius Alexander
8. Petrus Mohlolo Mahloko
9. Andrus Strauss
10. Gonasagaren Marimuthu Moodley
11. Johan Hendrik Van Wyngaard
12. Tseko Samuel Mpakathe
13. Schalk Daniel Johannes Strydom
14. Naresh Singh
15. Malixole Rehabilitate Mdolo
16. Samantha Virginia Alexander
17. Johannes Willem De Beer
18. Buti Elliot Mtembu
19. Esther Sheila Patricia Badenhorst
20. Thanduxolo Memani
21. Diederick Johannes Reinecke
22. Aubrey Maleho Sebotsa
23. Pholo Isaac Tau
24. Gordon David Adams
25. Katlego Duncan Pule
26. Lethoele Daniel Moeketsi
27. Amogelang Cecilia Thekiso
28. Riaan Meades
29. Ntjanyana Jan Kinamela
30. Mfalatsane Priscillah Motsuenyane
31. Lizette Anthea Büchling
32. Zandri Visser
33. Richard Russel Addison
34. Kgomotso Katiba
35. Joyce Lenkwang Mahlangu
36. James Nkosana Mlotha
37. King Kabelo Modingoana
38. Teboho Patrick Mokhomo
39. Khahlile Florence Mathe
40. Musa Favour Dube
41. Disebo Marian Ndayi
42. Phillimon Nthubu Ntlailane
43. Avhashoni Rembuluwani Netshivhungululu
44. Margaret Malehlohonolo Moloi
45. Jelly Nani Mahloko
46. Dean Tyron Meintjes
47. Nozipho Eugenia Mafu
48. Carlene Bartlett
49. Maritza Strauss
50. Promise Tshepiso Ntlailane
51. Ray-Charles Dazel
52. Charles William Culbert
53. Steven Naidoo
54. Olaotse Butt
55. Carla Van Der Merwe
56. Aloisha Anastacia Alexander
57. Michelle Botha
58. William Morena Motsamai
59. Tanja De Meillon
60. Leonard Dube
61. Nonkululeko Georgina Teise
62. Ockert Corneluis Hollenbach
63. Frans Hendrik Badenhorst
64. Ansori Badenhorst
65. Frans Hendrik Badenhorst

== ActionSA ==
=== National ===
1. Herman Samtseu Philip Mashaba
2. Roland Athol Price Trollip
3. Tebogo Kgosietsile Solomon Letlape
4. Alan David Beesley
5. Malebo Patricia Kobe
6. Michael Eric Beaumont
7. Tutu Lawrence Faleni
8. Sade Esmé Van Rooyen
9. Rafeek Shah
10. Nicodemus Solly Moeng
11. Ismail Joosub
12. Semakaleng Patricia Kopane
13. Pieter Naudé Scribante
14. Tshepo Confidence Magoma
15. Lerato Mikateko Ngobeni
16. Paulinah Tsholofelo Maforah
17. Sello Elias Lediga
18. Simphiwe Nhlakanipho Mkhwanazi
19. Dereleen Elana James
20. Julie Anne Lopes
21. Reuben Jacques Coetzer
22. Mpho Kendy Madisha
23. Nompumelelo Edward
24. Notukela Makohliso
25. Bongani Blessing Mabizela
26. Daughters Cecelia Khoza
27. Siyanda Edward Makhubo
28. Matthew Joshua George
29. Cyril Mboneni Bhekiswayo
30. Siphiwo Christopher Tshemese
31. Cornelius Karabo Seane
32. Malwande Nilcoson Mhlakaza
33. Temxon Zark Lebatlang
34. Sukumani Ezrom Mathumbu
35. Ntsoanyane Jonah Ramushu
36. Nelsing Sewraj
37. Adru Bosch
38. Willem Meshark Van Wyk
39. Tebogo Makadimetse Mathibane
40. Kutloano Rosinah Phoshoko
41. Margaret Nobuhle Mthembu
42. André Le Roux
43. Azwihangwisi Judith Mphidi
44. Glen Nkomo
45. Khazamula Samson Milondzo
46. Simangaliso Godfrey Shongwe
47. Arnold Kgabo Maleka
48. Marcelle David
49. Mahommed Cassim
50. Themba Welcome Ntuli
51. Kgobakanang Titus Ramapuputla
52. Andrew Lekgotla Pheto
53. Patrick Mabuse Morathi
54. Kagiso Gerald Galesitoe
55. Mark Mabitsi Boikanyo
56. Mogwerane Elijah Litheko
57. Johannes Jurie Snyman
58. Lincoln Mohoboya Uriah Machaba
59. Abednego Hlongwane
60. Mmachuene Rosina Moabelo
61. Gauta Jonas Komane
62. Ramatamo Joseph Sehoai
63. Matimba Brighton Maluleke
64. Emil Georg Scharf
65. Thulani Gerald Mncube
66. William Letlape Tsatsi
67. Jacobus Schalk Coetzee
68. Malesela Hendrick Matlou
69. Lukhanyo Gantsho
70. Tebogo Denzel Ntuli
71. Winty Mashaya Ngcukana
72. Sethembelo Majola
73. Mabihana Shadrack Mkhonto
74. Marcia Barron
75. Sekukuni Joseph Tlhakung
76. Joseph Dipalo Modibedi
77. Mzwandile Johannes Zumane
78. Bukhosi Cokoto
79. Mogege Cyprian Matjie
80. Masilo Ellse Tsolo
81. Livingstone Chilwane
82. Timothy Welile Motha
83. Busisiwe Thokozile Kate Twala
84. Guy Anthony Richards
85. Zalisile Vincent Ndzala
86. Takalani Raymond Tshikalaha
87. Paul Winston Nefdt
88. Makhosana Freddy Mhlanga
89. John Diale Mathakgala
90. Leteketa Joseph Mosuhli
91. Morutse Victor Chuene
92. Thabiso Odirile Moleleki
93. Stanly Lethabo Mabuza
94. Benjamin Kgokgotho Mekgwe
95. Rirhandzu Sibisi
96. Mulimisi Simon Raswiswi
97. Yimile Joseph Ngqele
98. Anwar Yasser Rassool
99. Delano Lindr? Theodore Coverdale
100. Gregory Solly Nathanil Klaas
101. Sonya Bella Höfler
102. Xolani Gumede
103. Kutlwano Moleme
104. Ngwala Tsomane Mashupye
105. Sello Ishmael Mabena
106. Lesetja Aubrey Shadung
107. Millard Christian Karabo Moloabi
108. Julius Mbula
109. Reabetswe Tshegofatso Maungwa
110. Zwelithini Bongani Petros Mtshali
111. Gladys Khanyisa Napo
112. Ayanda Penelope Tom
113. Pamela Nomfundo Kubheka
114. Ditshewana Maureen Makhapa
115. Nhuyani Edward Nxangani
116. Sandra Kelebogile Mafisa
117. Tjhere Edwin Ntshidi
118. Mxolisi Meshack Ngwetsheni
119. Khomotjo Jacqueline Mashala
120. Vusumuzi Sydney Hlatshwayo
121. Kabelo Cassius Moatshe
122. Bandile Booi
123. Joshua Monageng Thage
124. Patrick Siti Phakathi
125. Vuyani Sydwell Mathye
126. Mary Joyce Ntombela
127. Jan Lodewyk Ludike
128. Loganathan Pillay
129. Wilfred Mogoerane Litheko
130. Rosina Segone
131. Luhaha Arinao Ratshikuni
132. Chriselda Kenalemang Knox
133. Thabitha Elizabeth Mashegoana
134. Peter Tshepo Mphalo
135. Bethuele Phelehela Mohapeloa
136. Elekanyani Canny Ramafamba
137. Fundisiwe Petronella Cwele
138. Phemelo Samantha Kungwane
139. Mosesi Joshua Morabe
140. Mogodu Maake
141. Jacob Gaotenege Dipale
142. Marshall Tebakane
143. Thuthukani Reginald Magubane
144. Daniel Kgolokwe Mamabolo
145. Hasani Patrick Hobyane
146. Nkele Sarah Kosa
147. Ernest Ramaidi Lesaoana
148. Nnditsheni Eric Matshete
149. Ruhan Janse Van Rensburg
150. Petrus Magasa Aphane
151. Ntlahla Precious Dungayezi
152. Lekau Andy Wilson Mamabolo
153. Johny Mokwena
154. Daniel Ralesiba Papane
155. Euzabeth Mapule Sehume
156. Hazel Nongoma Nontlantla Mtitshana
157. Michele Corry
158. Ntombethemba Godongwana-Manase
159. Pierre Gideon Le Roux
160. Sibusiso Bokveldt
161. Sonwabo Mbongi
162. Phikolomzi Adonis
163. Yolanda Lucinda Gcanga
164. Moses Kagiso Jansen
165. Nomawethu Ndilisa Sbukwana
166. Basil Costa Coccosulis
167. Thabiso Mokhatla
168. Leonard Butiboy Mafokosi
169. Lisema Samson Keele
170. Frederik Thomas Botha
171. Mduduzi Christopher Ntuli
172. Theodorah Nokuzola Sibiya
173. Halalisani Manqoba Ndlovu
174. Thozama Qoqa
175. Bongumusa Gracious Kubheka
176. Annet Elizabeth Sewraj
177. Zwelisha Stanley Nxumalo
178. Ahmed Cara
179. Peter John Cunningham Graham
180. Nkosinathi Wiseman Ngwenya
181. Sea-Breeze Nolwandle Ngubane
182. Modise Rex Seemela
183. Norman Skhumbuzo Sibitane
184. Nhlanhla Harry Mazibuko
185. Lance Brett Poonawassy
186. Maserame June Mokoka
187. Karolus Marthinus De Wee
188. Kenvin Robert Andrews
189. Angeline Maurine Engelbrecht
190. Marcella Olivia Trudy Kesiamang
191. Cornelius Dawid Bezuidenhout
192. Auburn Francios Jaftha
193. Tshepo Anthony Moloko
194. Surech Nager Kika
195. Sandie Mac Donald
196. Brett Carlton Field
197. Daniel Albertus Van Wyk
198. Malibongwe Moses Qwashu

=== Regional ===
==== Eastern Cape ====
1. Roland Athol Trollip
2. Siphiwo Christopher Tshemese
3. Winty Mashaya Ngcukana
4. Yimile Joseph Ngqele
5. Sonya Bella Höfler
6. Hazel Nongoma Mtitshana
7. Michele Corry
8. Ntombethemba Godongwana‐Manase
9. Pierre Gideon Le Roux
10. Sibusiso Bokveldt
11. Sonwabo Mbongi
12. Phikolomzi Adonis
13. Yolanda Lucinda Gcanga

==== Free State ====
1. Semakaleng Patricia Kopane
2. Malwande Nilcoson Mhlakaza
3. Sekukuni Joseph Tlhakung
4. Mzwandile Johannes Zumane
5. Leteketa Joseph Mosuhli
6. Moses Kagiso Jansen
7. Nomawethu Ndilisa Sbukwana
8. Basil Costa Coccosulis
9. Thabiso Mokhatla
10. Leonard Butiboy Mafokosi

==== Gauteng ====
1. Herman Samtseu Mashaba
2. Tebogo Kgosietsile Letlape
3. Michael Eric Beaumont
4. Nicodemus Solly Moeng
5. Lerato Mikateko Ngobeni
6. Sello Elias Lediga
7. Dereleen Elana James
8. Mpho Kendy Madisha
9. Nompumelelo Edward
10. Bongani Blessing Mabizela
11. Siyanda Edward Makhubo
12. Temxon Zark Lebatlang
13. Ntsoanyane Jonah Ramushu
14. Adru Bosch
15. Willem Meshark Van Wyk
16. Tebogo Makadimetse Mathibane
17. Kutloano Rosinah Phoshoko
18. Margaret Nobuhle Mthembu
19. André Le Roux
20. Azwihangwisi Judith Mphidi
21. Arnold Kgabo Maleka
22. Mahommed Cassim
23. Patrick Mabuse Morathi
24. Kagiso Gerald Galesitoe
25. Mark Mabitsi Boikanyo
26. Mogwerane Elijah Litheko
27. Johannes Jurie Snyman
28. Lincoln Mohoboya Machaba
29. Gauta Jonas Komane
30. Ramatamo Joseph Sehoai
31. Emil Georg Scharf
32. Thulani Gerald Mncube
33. William Letlape Tsatsi
34. Jacobus Schalk Coetzee
35. Malesela Hendrick Matlou
36. Lukhanyo Gantsho
37. Sethembelo Majola
38. Mabihana Shadrack Mkhonto
39. Marcia Barron
40. Joseph Dipalo Modibedi
41. Bukhosi Cokoto
42. Livingstone Chilwane
43. Busisiwe Thokozile Twala
44. Guy Anthony Richards
45. Zalisile Vincent Ndzala
46. Nnditsheni Eric Matshete

==== KwaZulu-Natal ====
1. Alan David Beesley
2. Mohammed Rafeek Sayedali Shah
3. Simphiwe Nhlakanipho Mkhwanazi
4. Cyril Mboneni Bhekiswayo
5. Nelsing Sewraj
6. Marcelle David
7. Themba Welcome Ntuli
8. Kgobakanang Titus Ramapuputla
9. Xolani Gumede
10. Pamela Nomfundo Kubheka
11. Vusumuzi Sydney Hlatshwayo
12. Thuthukani Reginald Magubane
13. Zwakele Maxwell Mncwango
14. Mduduzi Christopher Ntuli
15. Theodorah Nokuzola Sibiya
16. Halalisani Manqoba Ndlovu
17. Thozama Qoqa
18. Bongumusa Gracious Kubheka
19. Annet Elizabeth Sewraj
20. Zwelisha Stanley Nxumalo
21. Ahmed Cara
22. Peter John Graham
23. Nkosinathi Wiseman Ngwenya
24. Sea‐Breeze Nolwandle Ngubane
25. Modise Rex Seemela

==== Limpopo ====
1. Malebo Patricia Kobe
2. Tshepo Confidence Magoma
3. Khazamula Samson Milondzo
4. Mmachuene Rosina Moabelo
5. Matimba Brighton Maluleke
6. Morutse Victor Chuene
7. Stanly Lethabo Mabuza
8. Ngwala Tsomane Mashupye
9. Lesetja Aubrey Shadung
10. Hasani Patrick Hobyane

==== Mpumalanga ====
1. Ismail Joosub
2. Daughters Cecelia Khoza
3. Sukumani Ezrom Mathumbu
4. Glen Nkomo
5. Simangaliso Godfrey Shongwe
6. Abednego Hlongwane
7. Tebogo Denzel Ntuli
8. Mogege Cyprian Matjie
9. Timothy Welile Motha
10. Norman Skhumbuzo Sibitane
11. Nhlanhla Harry Mazibuko

==== North-West ====
1. Tutu Lawrence Faleni
2. Paulinah Tsholofelo Maforah
3. Reuben Jacques Coetzer
4. Cornelius Karabo Seane
5. Andrew Lekgotla Pheto
6. Masilo Ellse Tsolo
7. Reabetswe Tshegofatso Maungwa
8. Sandra Kelebogile Mafisa
9. Wilfred Mogoerane Litheko
10. Rosina Segone
11. Chriselda Kenalemang Knox

==== Northern Cape ====
1. Sade Esmé Van Rooyen
2. Jan Lodewyk Ludike
3. Lance Brett Poonawassy
4. Maserame June Mokoka
5. Karolus Marthinus De Wee

==== Western Cape ====
1. Pieter Naudé Scribante
2. Julie Anne Lopes
3. Notukela Makohliso
4. Matthew Joshua George
5. Malibongwe Moses Qwashu
6. Mulimisi Simon Raswiswi
7. Bandile Booi
8. Fundisiwe Petronella Cwele
9. Ruhan Janse Van Rensburg
10. Sandie Mac Donald
11. Brett Carlton Field
12. Daniel Albertus Van Wyk
13. Maphanga Petrus Maseko
14. Stephanus Hendrik Gerber

=== Provincial ===
==== Eastern Cape ====
1. Roland Athol Price Trollip
2. Hazel Nongoma Nontlantla Mtitshana
3. Michele Corry
4. Ntombethemba Godongwana-Manase
5. Pierre Gideon Le Roux
6. Sibusiso Bokveldt
7. Sonwabo Mbongi
8. Phikolomzi Adonis
9. Yolanda Lucinda Gcanga
10. Faith Jabulile Nomfundiso Tame
11. William Donne Gould
12. Thembinkosi Moses Rawula
13. Loyiso Nqoto
14. Siyambonga Mbasane
15. Thando Dunjana
16. Tobela Vincent Ngomela
17. Ruby Dawn Lesedi Mbetshu
18. Thembinkosi Wilberforce Peta
19. Tandile Pretty Ntongana
20. Thandiswa Ivy Tongo
21. Francis Zwelandile Mdinwa
22. Zongamele Patrick Tshikana
23. Zwelithini Michael Gagayi
24. Nomfundo Faith Jamjam
25. Siphiwo Christopher Tshemese
26. Winty Mashaya Ngcukana
27. Yimile Joseph Ngqele
28. Sonya Bella Höfler
29. Suzette Britz
30. Nomhle Mzekelo
31. Monwabisi Southey Tame
32. Thandisizwe Henna
33. Bulelani Michael Tyeni
34. Ntomboxolo Cornelia Phandu
35. Siziwe Makaba
36. Nqaba Jonathan Manzi
37. Zelma Songca

==== Free State ====
1. Semakaleng Patricia Kopane
2. Moses Kagiso Jansen
3. Nomawethu Ndilisa Sbukwana
4. Basil Costa Coccosulis
5. Thabiso Mokhatla
6. Leonard Butiboy Mafokosi
7. Lisema Samson Keele
8. Frederik Thomas Botha
9. Malwande Nilcoson Mhlakaza
10. Sekukuni Joseph Tlhakung
11. Mzwandile Johannes Zumane
12. Leteketa Joseph Mosuhli
13. Billy David Mhlafu
14. Morena Matjelemane
15. Moses Lehlohonolo Matuba
16. Molefi Alfred Mogapi
17. Thabang Samuel Mokoena

==== Gauteng ====
1. Richard Funzela Ngobeni
2. Michael Eric Beaumont
3. Emma More
4. John Clifford Moodey
5. Kholofelo Vivian Morodi
6. Henriette Louise Fröhlich
7. Ephraim Ronnie Masilela
8. Sarah Teresa June Wissler
9. Malesela Phillip Dolo
10. Andrew Harris
11. Keletso Tokelo Selebalo
12. Eva Ntlatleng
13. Reuben Mlungisi Masango
14. Selby Sello Mabelebele
15. Granny Peggy De Bruin
16. Thabo Bongani Motsapi
17. Kishore Badal
18. Vincent Mzikayise Mazibuko
19. Christian Jacobus De Jager
20. Pusetsi Cheesline Matlala
21. Clarise Crushca De Lange-Williams
22. Tshikani Advice Chuma
23. Boitumelo Joyce Molefe
24. Lebogang Cleopatra Modukanene
25. Jacob Kekole Mathabathe
26. Phiwokuhle Siyabonga Xulu
27. Phumelele Nebe
28. Prince Kamogelo Mohlala
29. Musa Blessing Mbewe
30. Clayton Delron Paul
31. Johannes Sipho Motong
32. Webster Kutoane
33. Louis Mamoloko Masoga
34. Mbijana Jane Nkosi
35. Ernest Maluleke
36. Dorothy Lehlogonolo Rakate
37. Goboza Silas Mashaba
38. Sebego Daniel Hlongwane
39. Genevieve Väronique Marie Durand
40. Oupa Kuzwayo
41. Chinedu Edward
42. Paul Selepe
43. Wiseman Sithembiso Mkhize
44. Mzikayise Mgijima
45. Ramosele Sethibe
46. Daniel Makubela
47. Darryl Troy Voskuil
48. Ruben Barry
49. Murendeni Irwin Nemalale
50. Caiphus Hlamishi Moloto
51. Michael James Basch
52. Jacob Dinkwanyana Aphane
53. Selata Nkwane
54. Siphiwe Elizabeth Masina
55. Mochini John Mofokeng
56. Prince Makoko Ntobeng
57. Refuwe Thubela
58. Vusimuzi Nicholus Ngomane
59. Ntombikayise Thulisiwe Myeza
60. Richard Benjamin Skippers
61. Phakela Johannes Maitse
62. Mpho Masipa
63. Lulama Mabeko
64. Mogomotsi Phillip Sedumedi
65. Ezekiel Nche
66. Dikeledi Brenda Mphela
67. Cosby Thembinkosi Silaule
68. Vuyisile William Mcunana
69. Sivuyile Bless Nomlala
70. Zwelitsha Cornel Nkalitshana
71. Seun Johannes Mokgotho
72. Sakhiseni Zamokwakhe Khuzwayo
73. Letta Charlotte Zitha
74. Wanda Mpumelelo Pato
75. Mathule Ezekiel Makhotla
76. Desmond Aldous
77. Solomon Momoti
78. Maggie Lebohang Mokoka
79. Mohlatlego Joseph Kgatla
80. Petrus Malesela Makgoale

==== KwaZulu-Natal ====
1. Zwakele Maxwell Mncwango
2. Mduduzi Christopher Ntuli
3. Theodorah Nokuzola Sibiya
4. Halalisani Manqoba Ndlovu
5. Thozama Qoqa
6. Bongumusa Gracious Kubheka
7. Annet Elizabeth Sewraj
8. Zwelisha Stanley Nxumalo
9. Ahmed Cara
10. Peter John Cunningham Graham
11. Nkosinathi Wiseman Ngwenya
12. Sea-Breeze Nolwandle Ngubane
13. Modise Rex Seemela
14. Thembokwakhe Abubakar Mseleku
15. Avinash Balbaran
16. Simphiwe Shangase
17. Phindile Ntombizodwa Xulu
18. Musa Goodhope Buthelezi
19. Patricia Zanele Gcwensa
20. Nozipho Cynthia Ngobese
21. Msizi Mgobhozi
22. Zama Princess Nene-Gumbi
23. Ahmed Abdool Khalek Paruk
24. Thandazile Patience Manqele
25. Zethu Claudia Mcoyi
26. Gatsha Confessor Mkhize
27. Alan David Beesley
28. Mohammed Rafeek Sayedali Shah
29. Simphiwe Nhlakanipho Mkhwanazi
30. Cyril Mboneni Bhekiswayo
31. Nelsing Sewraj
32. Marcelle David
33. Kgobakanang Titus Ramapuputla
34. Xolani Gumede
35. Pamela Nomfundo Kubheka
36. Vusumuzi Sydney Hlatshwayo
37. Thuthukani Reginald Magubane
38. Ayanda Emmanuel Ngubane
39. Sanelisiwe Sbongumusa Zuma
40. Sylvia Ntombifuthi Zama Gcwensa
41. Gervasia Thandazile Duma
42. Zamile Khumalo
43. Zanele Gumbi

==== Limpopo ====
1. Mokono Victor Mothemela
2. Ngwako Edward Gaffane
3. John Nake
4. Tebogo Mokgaetji Johanna Chuene
5. Mahlatse Fiona Mashele
6. Ndinannyi Eunice Singo
7. Ngwala Tsomane Mashupye
8. Wisani Henry Maswanganyi
9. Ronald Tshilidzi Tshilongamulenzhe
10. Ditedu Jeffrey Moruane
11. Kgabo Lucia Mathibe
12. Cecilia Mmaphuti Setati
13. Thaloki David Molokomme
14. Nkhensani Maureen Mogotsi
15. Soyaphi Vincent Mabunda
16. Madumetja William Chabalala
17. Diboneng Melvyn Shai
18. Eric Lucky Kekana
19. Nhlake Edward Gwangwa
20. Malebo Patricia Kobe
21. Tshepo Confidence Magoma
22. Khazamula Samson Milondzo
23. Mmachuene Rosina Moabelo
24. Matimba Brighton Maluleke
25. Morutse Victor Chuene
26. Stanly Lethabo Mabuza
27. Lesetja Aubrey Shadung
28. Hasani Patrick Hobyane
29. Mokgoba Tiego Thotse
30. Simon? Grobler-Botes

==== Mpumalanga ====
1. Florence Thokozile Mashiane
2. Norman Skhumbuzo Sibitane
3. Nhlanhla Harry Mazibuko
4. Enos Sebesho
5. Sandile Nicholus Sambo
6. Toney John Motha
7. Madisebo Phillipine Radebe
8. Primrose Nontobeko Mabuza
9. Mandla Tony Goodman Mabuza
10. Themba Isaac Mnguni
11. Dudu Yvonne Nkalanga
12. Ephenia Sape Mafagane
13. Lehlohonolo John Mokhahla
14. Ismail Joosub
15. Daughters Cecelia Khoza
16. Sukumani Ezrom Mathumbu
17. Simangaliso Godfrey Shongwe
18. Abednego Hlongwane
19. Tebogo Denzel Ntuli
20. Mogege Cyprian Matjie
21. Timothy Welile Motha
22. Glen Nkomo
23. Bikwaphi Gladys Nkosi
24. Motlalefe Gabriel Mogakane
25. Ephrance Kamogelo Chadi
26. Gugu Pertunia Thwala

==== North-West ====
1. Kwena Darius Mangope
2. Selabe Mogakolodi Joseph Masibi
3. Blescious Matjoi Mongale
4. Margaret Baitlotli Setou
5. Nkolasi Charlotte Melela
6. Lekgotla Paul Chirwa
7. Thabo Mathews Maungwa
8. Othusitse Patrick Matseka
9. Christopher Seero Tsile
10. Sylvia Mmamohapi Pheto
11. Thabiso Thuto Shomolekae
12. Cradwin Uzanne Barnardtonian Tafita
13. Keith Murray Marshall
14. Josephine Ramolobeng
15. Mothobi Edward Mothobi
16. Modise Lucas Mabeko
17. Maburane Gilbert Rakumakoe
18. Kgolokoe Hamlet Kgobokoe
19. Mabedi Archibald Sethaelo
20. Madoda Ambrose Nobula
21. Tutu Lawrence Faleni
22. Reuben Jacques Coetzer
23. Cornelius Karabo Seane
24. Andrew Lekgotla Pheto
25. Masilo Ellse Tsolo
26. Reabetswe Tshegofatso Maungwa
27. Sandra Kelebogile Mafisa
28. Wilfred Mogoerane Litheko
29. Rosina Segone
30. Chriselda Kenalemang Knox

==== Northern Cape ====
1. Andrew Louw
2. Lance Brett Poonawassy
3. Maserame June Mokoka
4. Karolus Marthinus De Wee
5. Kenvin Robert Andrews
6. Angeline Maurine Engelbrecht
7. Marcella Olivia Trudy Kesiamang
8. Cornelius Dawid Bezuidenhout
9. Auburn Francios Jaftha
10. Tshepo Anthony Moloko
11. Surech Nager Kika
12. Jonathan Adams
13. Juleen Denise Owies
14. Sophia Daniels
15. Dafita Walter Nakedi

==== Western Cape ====
1. Angela Sobey
2. Sandie Mac Donald
3. Malibongwe Moses Qwashu
4. Brett Carlton Field
5. Daniel Albertus Van Wyk
6. Stephanus Hendrik Gerber
7. Maphanga Petrus Maseko
8. Pheasant Claire Orpen Reid
9. Ernest Alfred Jan Beyers
10. Matthew Joshua George
11. Pieter Naud? Scribante
12. Julie Anne Lopes
13. Notukela Makohliso
14. Mulimisi Simon Raswiswi
15. Bandile Booi
16. Fundisiwe Petronella Cwele
17. Ruhan Janse Van Rensburg
18. Mildred Sandra Davids
19. Nokutula Mahlati
20. Jan Isaacs
21. Mongezi Patrick Fepiwe
22. Reginald Heinrich Daniel Carolus
23. Dagan Alexander Naeser

== African Christian Democratic Party ==
=== National ===
1. **Kenneth Raselabe Joseph Meshoe**
2. **Wayne Maxim Thring**
3. **Steven Nicholas Swart**
4. **Marie Elizabeth Sukers**
5. Gabriella Bernadette La Foy
6. Mokhethi Raymond Tlaeli
7. Siseko Wycliff Mdlokolo
8. Norman Fana Mkhonza
9. Ntombizodwa Wonkie Ncoco
10. Mzamane Convy Baloyi
11. Jeanette Elizabeth Gouws
12. Phophoma Olga Makgoba
13. Esther Lebogang Meshoe
14. Ronald Winston Harris
15. Joseph Temlett
16. Jameel Essop
17. Simphiwe Bellview Mboweni
18. Khayelihle Zithobile Manqele
19. Prudence Mabasa
20. Phogole Doctor Sethole
21. Johanna Marianne Lötter
22. Thomas Sarel Lessing
23. Rugene Minessa Dees
24. Fredrico Denys Hendricks
25. Otniel Linden Jooste
26. Martin Charl Burke
27. Robert Herold Wylde
28. Michel David Adams
29. Nokliniki Mary Akrasi-Boateng
30. Melasa Malarie Isaiah
31. Demetrius Kenneth Dudley
32. Charné Copeland Gerber
33. Neil Cornelius Williams
34. Anna Eleonora Louw
35. Avinesh Chetty
36. Keitumetse Mabena
37. Mongezi Mabungani
38. Bongani David Ngema
39. Deidrée Carol De Vos
40. Petra Du Plessis
41. Ivan Jardine
42. Martha Susanna Scholtz
43. Lumka Patricia Funde
44. Sharon Elizabeth Gordon
45. Cheslyn Lynden Jacobs
46. Melody Makhosazana Maseko
47. Lonwabo Moss
48. Nelmarie Eloff
49. Hashu Benjunior Mankhili
50. Esmarelda Valencia Mckay
51. Enock Tsietsi Modisakeng
52. Kim-Lyn Casey Van Niekerk
53. Maureen Nokuzola Khumalo
54. Daniel Tsholofelo Sello
55. Andries Petrus Bernardo
56. Thelma Busisiwe Hlongwane
57. Famanda Brighton Hlongwane
58. Thapelo April Ntombela
59. Gillian Verona Walker
60. Gaolatlhwe Jeremia Tshipo
61. Catharina Putter
62. John Peter Joseph Gordon
63. Alina Mapule Mokhoamme
64. Donovan Leslie Wenn
65. Sipho Perfect Thwala
66. Lethusang Matheu Khalienyane
67. Ntuthuko Progress Khumalo
68. Nathaniel Simende Mangue
69. Mzamane Ezekiel Mashaba
70. Michael Mosweu Sikwane
71. Anwar Constance
72. Simo Gumede
73. Dwynne Johannes
74. Lerato Princess Kobedi
75. Karin Maritz-Güldenpfennig
76. Carol Meth
77. Gregory Richard Mitchell
78. Abisai Monaise
79. Magugudi Jonah Motsoaledi
80. Rashaad Raybin
81. Rebaone Welhemina Manyaapelo
82. Busisiwe Hessie Mokoena
83. Itumeleng Elizabeth Hobbs
84. Faans Jantjies
85. Maroke Theuphilus Leopeng
86. Masechaba Granny Chiloane
87. Nnyambeleni Joyce Matsheketsheke Theunissen
88. George Petzer
89. Orapeleng James Sefako
90. Ellay Muyaphi Skwambane
91. Shirley Elaine Adams
92. Charles Field Ballantyne
93. Christo Bernardus Campher
94. Janetta Louisa Maria Crouse
95. Marilyn Isaacs
96. Nicholas Richard Johnson
97. Josephiné Dorothea Desiré Maaske
98. Kevin Frans Mathe
99. Vuyokazi Nomfundo Mdlokolo
100. Sipho Moses Radebe
101. Sanville Llewellyn Moses
102. Shaun Van Rensburg
103. Leonard Crouse
104. Emmanuel Khawula
105. Dominic John Stephen Lahoud
106. Thomas Lennox Mathebula
107. Tsiboloane Magdaline Mathobako
108. Musawenkosi Kenson Mbense
109. Neo Sylvia Mkhabela
110. Tshwene Sylvia Motlanthe-Maleka
111. Maria Moothoo Padayachee
112. Russell Acton Petzer
113. Ashton Fernando Schutte
114. Terri Lee Victor
115. Meena Kisten
116. Zimasa Mateyise
117. Mphahle Maurice Matjomane
118. Patty Bella Mckaw
119. Gideon Thiart
120. Alain Walljee
121. Dumisani Nobaza
122. Maryke Neethling
123. Mbulelo Maxwell Ngewu
124. Tokozile Mavis Maqamela
125. Malusi Sydney Keto
126. Roy Lester Stevens
127. Nomaxabiso Jessica Mbombo
128. Rebecca Elsie Cain
129. Colett Sherldin Seleke
130. Dani°L Hendriks
131. Helen Louw
132. Mark Anthony Malander
133. Daylen Chazlen Kurt Nero
134. Jessica Emmerantia Selinah Mongale
135. Chantel Sibongile Khonkhobe
136. Mitta Letshepe
137. Christian Karl Peter Rohlssen
138. Tsakani Shirindza
139. Thanyani Joseph Muronga
140. Sokwang Lydia Lebesa
141. Sibongile Sharozi Sekhu
142. Lizanda Dobson
143. Shiiko Joseph Ramaselele
144. Sizakele Olica Maseko
145. Phindile Monicah Buso
146. Lorraintia Sibongile Ngema
147. Moleboheng Koloti
148. Sifiso Maswidi Ngwenya
149. Sizwe Ngema
150. Tracy Lee Minne
151. Yvonne Zanele Msani
152. Keinock Jabulani Ndlovu
153. Shantal Wandile Ncube
154. Delmondt Godfrey Cookson
155. Gloria Maletsatsi Digoamaje
156. Duduzile Mzimela
157. Khahliso Botjeka
158. Innocent Maphalala
159. Cabonina Annah Masango
160. Nomonde Patricia Sikhakhane
161. Tebello Nereah Mosese
162. Qheku Bosof Lephoto
163. Reginald Fabian Langson
164. Muhle Ntombi Sibiya
165. Joseph Thomas
166. Lumka Nyawose
167. Derrick Thulani Nkosi
168. Elizabeth Nonguquko Sokanyile
169. Thabang Moshidi
170. Ronald Morake
171. Vuyani Lifalethu Ntshangase
172. Rienus Niemand
173. Ntombikayise Staff Mpungose
174. Zephania Celinhlanhla Myeni
175. Bhekumusa Elliot Nxumalo
176. Patience Nozwelo Mngadi
177. Siboniso Steven Thwala
178. Thandeka Maureen Mthabela
179. Sylvester Mnisi
180. Mbalenhle Faith Portia Khumalo
181. Monica Scholtz
182. Frederik Jacobus Erasmus
183. Leah Hlatshwayo
184. Nikiwe Lilly Sithole
185. Nomhle Keletso Maoku
186. Kate Mashego
187. Nkosana Goodman Ntuli
188. Nester Pretty Makutu
189. Celesta Thando Premadona Ndzinisa
190. Veronica Odendaal

=== Regional ===
==== Eastern Cape ====
1. Johanna Marianne Lötter
2. Robert Herold Wylde
3. Nokliniki Mary Akrasi‐Boateng
4. Lumka Patricia Funde
5. Lonwabo Moss
6. Karin Maritz‐Güldenpfennig
7. Faans Jantjies
8. George Petzer
9. Maria Moothoo Padayachee
10. Andries Petrus Bernardo
11. Roy Lester Stevens
12. Dominic John Stephen Lahoud
13. Christo Bernardus Campher
14. Russell Acton Petzer
15. Zimasa Mateyise
16. Ashton Fernando Schutte
17. Josephiné Dorothea Desiré Maaske
18. Shaun Van Rensburg
19. Charles Field Ballantyne
20. Janetta Louisa Maria Crouse
21. Leonard Crouse
22. Terri Lee Victor

==== Free State ====
1. Thapelo April Ntombela
2. Charné Copeland Gerber
3. Thomas Sarel Lessing
4. Lethusang Matheu Khalienyane
5. Tsiboloane Magdaline Mathobako

==== Gauteng ====
1. Kenneth Raselabe Joseph Meshoe
2. Siseko Wycliff Mdlokolo
3. Mokhethi Raymond Tlaeli
4. Mzamane Convy Baloyi
5. Ronald Winston Harris
6. Norman Fana Mkhonza
7. Phogole Doctor Sethole
8. Vuyokazi Nomfundo Mdlokolo
9. Bongani David Ngema
10. Keitumetse Mabena
11. Ivan Jardine
12. Prudence Mabasa
13. Avinesh Chetty
14. Masechaba Granny Chiloane
15. Thelma Busisiwe Hlongwane
16. Maureen Nokuzola Khumalo
17. Lerato Princess Kobedi
18. Phophoma Olga Makgoba
19. Elsie Mostert
20. Sarah Pemella Zulu‐Moema
21. Hermina Dikeledi Hlatshwayo
22. Buyile William Mngqikana
23. Duduzile Mzimela
24. Lucky Thulani Ncube
25. Teressa Makhala Ntilane
26. Erasmus Masande Papu
27. Shiiko Joseph Ramaselele
28. Christian Karl Peter Rohlssen
29. Sibongile Sharozi Sekhu
30. Tsakani Shirindza
31. Zanele Wendoline Gloria Shabalala
32. Robert Andreas Bender

==== KwaZulu-Natal ====
1. Wayne Maxim Thring
2. Gabriella Bernadette La Foy
3. Khayelihle Zithobile Manqele
4. Thandeka Maureen Mthabela
5. Michelle Bridget Tryon
6. Caiphas Mbongiseni Mtshali
7. Ntombikayise Staff Mpungose
8. Johannes Jacobus Van Der Merwe
9. Jameel Essop
10. Theresa Triumpha Sithole
11. Yvonne Zanele Msani
12. Musawenkosi Kenson Mbense
13. Lumka Nyawose
14. Ntuthuko Progress Khumalo
15. Zephania Celinhlanhla Myeni
16. Marilyn Isaacs
17. Keinock Jabulani Ndlovu
18. James Barry Munnik
19. Emmanuel Khawula
20. Derrick Thulani Nkosi
21. Simo Gumede
22. Muhle Ntombi Sibiya
23. Tracy Lee Minne
24. Vuyani Lifalethu Ntshangase
25. Shantal Wandile Ncube
26. Bhekumusa Elliot Nxumalo
27. Patience Nozwelo Mngadi
28. Patty Bella Mckaw
29. Dwynne Johannes
30. Carol Meth
31. Fortune Bhekukwenza Ngwenya
32. Joseph Thomas
33. Meena Kisten
34. Elizabeth Nonguquko Sokanyile
35. Siboniso Steven Thwala

==== Limpopo ====
1. Famanda Brighton Hlongwane
2. Nnyambeleni Joyce Matsheketsheke Theunissen
3. Magugudi Jonah Motsoaledi
4. Anna Eleonora Louw
5. Maroke Theuphilus Leopeng
6. Neo Sylvia Mkhabela
7. Kevin Frans Mathe
8. Thomas Lennox Mathebula
9. Mphahle Maurice Matjomane
10. Hashu Benjunior Mankhili
11. Simphiwe Bellview Mboweni
12. Tshwene Sylvia Motlanthe‐Maleka

==== Mpumalanga ====
1. Joseph Temlett
2. Petra Du Plessis
3. Martha Susanna Scholtz
4. Mzamane Ezekiel Mashaba
5. Catharina Putter
6. Walter Mnisi
7. Busisiwe Hessie Mokoena
8. Ellay Muyaphi Skwambane
9. Sipho Perfect Thwala
10. Barbara Maria Elizabeth Smit

==== North-West ====
1. Enock Tsietsi Modisakeng
2. Gaolatlhwe Jeremia Tshipo
3. Daniel Tsholofelo Sello
4. Michael Mosweu Sikwane
5. Alina Mapule Mokhoamme
6. Itumeleng Elizabeth Hobbs
7. Abisai Monaise
8. Orapeleng James Sefako
9. Sipho Moses Radebe
10. Kelebogile Lenah Marumo
11. Rebaone Welhemina Manyaapelo

==== Northern Cape ====
1. Marie Elizabeth Sukers
2. Nelmarie Eloff
3. Esmarelda Valencia Mckay
4. Kim‐Lyn Casey Van Niekerk
5. Willie Coetzee

==== Western Cape ====
1. Steven Nicholas Swart
2. Mongezi Mabungani
3. Ntombizodwa Wonkie Ncoco
4. Jeanette Elizabeth Gouws
5. Martin Charl Burke
6. Neil Cornelius Williams
7. Otniel Linden Jooste
8. Deidrée Carol De Vos
9. Demetrius Kenneth Dudley
10. Donovan Leslie Wenn
11. Fredrico Denys Hendricks
12. Rugene Minessa Dees
13. Anwar Constance
14. Gillian Verona Walker
15. Cheslyn Lynden Jacobs
16. Shirley Elaine Adams
17. John Peter Joseph Gordon
18. Delmondt Godfrey Cookson
19. Rashaad Raybin
20. Gregory Richard Mitchell
21. Sharon Elizabeth Gordon
22. Michel David Adams
23. Gideon Thiart
24. Sanville Llewellyn Moses

=== Provincial ===
==== Eastern Cape ====
1. John Peter Joseph Gordon
2. Lance Patrick Grootboom
3. Lumka Patricia Funde
4. Robert Herold Wylde
5. Johanna Marianne Lötter
6. Lonwabo Moss
7. Alain Walljee
8. Maryke Neethling
9. Karin Maritz-Güldenpfennig
10. Nokliniki Mary Akrasi-Boateng
11. Mbulelo Maxwell Ngewu
12. Dumisani Nobaza
13. Faans Jantjies
14. George Petzer
15. Maria Moothoo Padayachee
16. Tokozile Mavis Maqamela
17. Andries Petrus Bernardo
18. Malusi Sydney Keto
19. Roy Lester Stevens
20. Nomaxabiso Jessica Mbombo
21. Dominic John Stephen Lahoud
22. Christo Bernardus Campher
23. Zimasa Mateyise
24. Ashton Fernando Schutte
25. Shaun Van Rensburg
26. Charles Field Ballantyne
27. Leonard Crouse
28. Janetta Louisa Maria Crouse
29. Terri Lee Victor

==== Free State ====
1. Pule Joseph Rampai
2. Charné Copeland Gerber
3. Tsiboloane Magdaline Mathobako
4. Rosalia Maletsatsi Moenyane
5. Thomas Sarel Lessing
6. Lethusang Matheu Khalienyane
7. Thapelo April Ntombela
8. Makhala Leteane

==== Gauteng ====
1. Dulton Keith Adams
2. Mokhethi Raymond Tlaeli
3. Tambo Andrew Mokoena
4. Joshua Tebogo Meshoe
5. Sarah Pemella Zulu-Moema
6. Ronald Winston Harris
7. Siseko Wycliff Mdlokolo
8. Linda Meridy Yates
9. Avinesh Chetty
10. Keitumetse Mabena
11. Simphiwe Bellview Mboweni
12. Bongani David Ngema
13. Melody Makhosazana Maseko
14. Xoliwe Mirriam Batalisi
15. Phophoma Olga Makgoba
16. Lizanda Dobson
17. Sarah Mmakatjibe Sibanda
18. Maureen Nokuzola Khumalo
19. Prudence Mabasa
20. Norman Fana Mkhonza
21. Kedibone Betty Mpya
22. Shiiko Joseph Ramaselele
23. Cindy Brenda Sibuyi
24. Badi Meshack Bulunga
25. Teressa Makhala Ntilane
26. Sizakele Olica Maseko
27. Sibongile Sharozi Sekhu
28. Nomathemba Idah Dlamini
29. Mothepane Josephina Khiba
30. Sifiso Maswidi Ngwenya
31. Simphiwe Masiya
32. Vuyokazi Nomfundo Mdlokolo
33. Lerato Princess Kobedi
34. Elsie Mostert
35. Zanele Wendoline Gloria Shabalala
36. Sokwang Lydia Lebesa
37. Jackqueline Nonhlanhla Onyekpe
38. Lorraintia Sibongile Ngema
39. Phindile Monicah Buso
40. Thelma Busisiwe Hlongwane
41. Hermina Dikeledi Hlatshwayo
42. Moleboheng Koloti
43. Nomaxabiso Qanda
44. Mosimanegape Mathule
45. Elizabeth Mdluli
46. Mpho Monica Magopane
47. Lebohang Queen Kobane
48. Sybil Wendy Seletisha
49. Bohlokwa Abegail Setsabi
50. Siphindile Victoria Piquie
51. Maria Busisiwe Rantho
52. Mule Annah Hlatshwayo
53. Sizwe Ngema
54. Duduzile Mzimela
55. Nombulelo Nomonde Rachael Mohapi
56. Nontando Joy Dlakavu
57. Tsakani Shirindza
58. Nohlanhla Letta Nhlapho
59. Jabulile Motsoeneng
60. Khahliso Botjeka
61. Christian Karl Peter Rohlssen
62. Innocent Maphalala
63. Cabonina Annah Masango
64. Nomonde Patricia Sikhakhane
65. Sarah Matlhwatlhwa Moeketsi
66. Tebello Nereah Mosese
67. Qheku Bosof Lephoto
68. Reginald Fabian Langson

==== KwaZulu-Natal ====
1. Sipho Eric Manqele
2. Wayne Maxim Thring
3. Thandeka Maureen Mthabela
4. Melasa Malarie Isaiah
5. Nathaniel Simende Mangue
6. Siboniso Steven Thwala
7. Johannes Jacobus Van Der Merwe
8. Michelle Bridget Tryon
9. Yvonne Zanele Msani
10. Jameel Essop
11. Elizabeth Nonguquko Sokanyile
12. Rienus Niemand
13. Vuyani Lifalethu Ntshangase
14. Shantal Wandile Ncube
15. James Barry Munnik
16. Emmanuel Khawula
17. Caiphas Mbongiseni Mtshali
18. Zephania Celinhlanhla Myeni
19. Ntombikayise Staff Mpungose
20. Theresa Triumpha Sithole
21. Keinock Jabulani Ndlovu
22. Tracy Lee Minne
23. Derrick Thulani Nkosi
24. Lumka Nyawose
25. Simo Gumede
26. Musawenkosi Kenson Mbense
27. Muhle Ntombi Sibiya
28. Bhekumusa Elliot Nxumalo
29. Marilyn Isaacs
30. Patience Nozwelo Mngadi
31. Patty Bella Mckaw
32. Nicholas Richard Johnson
33. Carol Meth
34. Fortune Bhekukwenza Ngwenya
35. Joseph Thomas
36. Meena Kisten

==== Limpopo ====
1. Diphatse Joel Makola
2. Tshilidzi Albert Nephalama
3. Shumani Edward Ndouvhada
4. Moloke Patrick Masha
5. Magugudi Jonah Motsoaledi
6. Nnyambeleni Joyce Matsheketsheke Theunissen
7. Hashu Benjunior Mankhili
8. Anna Eleonora Louw
9. Neo Sylvia Mkhabela
10. Kevin Frans Mathe
11. Thomas Lennox Mathebula
12. Mphahle Maurice Matjomane
13. Rosina Mosima Sebati
14. Nthambeleni Vison Mudau
15. Tshwene Sylvia Motlanthe-Maleka
16. Samuel Mampapatla Madikoto

==== Mpumalanga ====
1. Jacob Johannes Scholtz
2. Busisiwe Hessie Mokoena
3. Petra Du Plessis
4. Joseph Temlett
5. Mzamane Ezekiel Mashaba
6. Susarah Cornelia Mouton
7. Martha Susanna Scholtz
8. Sylvester Mnisi
9. Mbalenhle Faith Portia Khumalo
10. Zanoyise Howard Thwala

==== North-West ====
1. Shirley Charlotte Marvey
2. Enock Tsietsi Modisakeng
3. Michael Mosweu Sikwane
4. Gaolatlhwe Jeremia Tshipo
5. Daniel Tsholofelo Sello
6. Alina Mapule Mokhoamme
7. Itumeleng Elizabeth Hobbs
8. Abisai Monaise
9. Orapeleng James Sefako
10. Rebaone Welhemina Manyaapelo
11. Sipho Moses Radebe
12. Gloria Maletsatsi Digoamaje

==== Northern Cape ====
1. Johnathin Anthony Sukers
2. Marie Elizabeth Sukers
3. Nelmarie Eloff
4. Kim-Lyn Casey Van Niekerk
5. Willie Coetzee
6. Rudolph Mouton
7. Roddy Robert Loff
8. Kevin Charles Mc Key
9. Johannes Jacobus Opperman
10. Burnet Gerard Greeff
11. Rebecca Elsie Cain
12. Colett Sherldin Seleke
13. Dani°L Hendriks
14. Helen Louw
15. Zeilede Roxanne Kgomongoe
16. Mark Anthony Malander
17. Derek Kayser
18. Jessica Emmerantia Selinah Mongale
19. Chantel Sibongile Khonkhobe
20. Mitta Letshepe

==== Western Cape ====
1. Ferlon Charles Christians
2. Grant Christopher Ronald Haskin
3. Martin Charl Burke
4. Mongezi Mabungani
5. Jeanette Elizabeth Gouws
6. Rugene Minessa Dees
7. Otniel Linden Jooste
8. Neil Cornelius Williams
9. Deidrée Carol De Vos
10. Ntombizodwa Wonkie Ncoco
11. Delmondt Godfrey Cookson
12. Gillian Verona Walker
13. Fredrico Denys Hendricks
14. Donovan Leslie Wenn
15. Anwar Constance
16. Cheslyn Lynden Jacobs
17. John Peter Joseph Gordon
18. Shirley Elaine Adams
19. Rashaad Raybin
20. Gregory Richard Mitchell
21. Michel David Adams
22. Sharon Elizabeth Gordon
23. Gideon Thiart
24. Sanville Llewellyn Moses

== African Independent Congress ==
=== National ===
1. **Mandlenkosi Phillip Galo**
2. **Steven Mahlubanzima Jafta**
3. Sivuyile Ngodwana
4. Ditlhare Ngubelanga
5. Yongama Mabhengu
6. Fundiswa Langa
7. Sibamba-Ngazibini Mgolombane
8. Vathiswa Ncukana
9. Nikiwe Madikizela
10. Nozuko Njobe
11. Mthakathi Jack Malindi
12. Jeremiah Sipho Mahlangu
13. Mxolisi Jerome Koom
14. Nkosivile Desmond Ndzipho
15. Thsonono Christopher Solomon Buyeye
16. Alfred Qai
17. Margeret Sheron Arnolds
18. Ayanda Mbizafa
19. Loyiso Lunga Masisa
20. Phillis Bulelwa Goniwe
21. Nonzame Beatrice Ngxavulana
22. Duduzile Happiness Mthembu
23. Fakazile Ntwakumba
24. Wele Clement Mdolomba
25. Veliswa Buyeye
26. Nonbulelo Shirley Xatasi
27. Temba Aubrey Mhlongo
28. Khaya Mhlaba
29. Lindiwe Masisi Mkwanazi
30. Nomalady Eleanor Dlela
31. Sisanele Ncukana
32. Mongezi Mpatheni
33. Nosikhumbuzo Daniel
34. Vuyani Gladwin Tutu
35. Temperance Ntombendlovu Mkhuba
36. Gloria Khanyisa Msitshana
37. Kgabele Hensford Mothibeli
38. Matilida Noziphiwo Mbena
39. Ziyanda Mndiyata
40. Bulela Xokiyana
41. Rebecca Thom

=== Regional ===
==== Gauteng ====
1. Temba Aubrey Mhlongo
2. Mphunzi Christopher Mayekiso
3. Bulela Xokiyana
4. Rebecca Thom
5. Mxolisi Jerome Koom

== African National Congress ==
The African National Congress (ANC) fielded 284 candidates for the election, including President Cyril Ramaphosa, who is seeking a second and final term as head of state. However, the party was criticized for provisionally including four ministers (Zizi Kodwa, Malusi Gigaba, David Mahlobo, and Gwede Mantashe) who were implicated in a corruption investigation into the administration of former president Jacob Zuma, pending the final results of an intraparty review. Fourteen other officials were either disqualified or not listed as candidates by the ANC over the same issue.

=== National ===
1. **Cyril Ramaphosa**
2. **Paul Mashatile**
3. **Gwede Mantashe**
4. **Maropene Ramokgopa**
5. **Ronald Lamola**
6. **Thembi Nkadimeng**
7. **Sihle Zikalala**
8. **Khumbudzo Ntshavheni**
9. **Sisisi Tolashe**
10. **Pinky Kekana**
11. **David Masondo**
12. **Mmamoloko Kubayi**
13. **David Mahlobo**
14. **Tandi Mahambehlala**
15. **Soviet Lekganyane**
16. Tshehofatso Chauke
17. **Buti Manamela**
18. **Bernice Swarts**
19. **Senzo Mchunu**
20. **Sindisiwe Chikunga**
21. Zuko Godlimpi
22. Nonceba Mhlauli
23. Phumzile Mgcina
24. **Alvin Botes**
25. **Ncediso Goodenough Kodwa**
26. Anna Moraka
27. **Malusi Gigaba**
28. **Pemmy Majodina**
29. Ronalda Nalumango
30. **Joe Maswanganyi**
31. Polly Boshielo
32. Mdumiseni Ntuli
33. Khomotjo Maimela
34. Dickson Masemola
35. Helen Neale-May
36. Dina Pule
37. **Mondli Gungubele**
38. Faith Muthambi
39. **Barbara Creecy**
40. **Cassel Mathale**
41. **Thembi Siweya**
42. **Gerhard Koornhof**
43. **Rosemary Capa**
44. **Rachel Adams**
45. **Kgosientsho Ramokgopa**
46. Yanga Govana
47. Tsakani Goodness Shiviti
48. Lufefe Mkutu
49. Bejani Freddy Chauke
50. Nomakhosazana Meth
51. Sylvia Lucas
52. **Thoko Didiza**
53. **Aaron Motsoaledi**
54. Mokgadi Aphiri
55. Ntando Maduna
56. **Altia Sthembile Hlongo'**
57. **Andries Nel**
58. **Mikateko Mahlaule**
59. **Doris Dlakude**
60. Lungi Mnganga-Gcabashe
61. **Thembeka Mchunu**
62. **Enoch Godongwana**
63. Khusela Sangoni
64. Supra Mahumapelo
65. Fasiha Hassan
66. Sedukanelo Louw
67. **Xola Nqola**
68. Steve Letsike
69. Lindiwe Ntshalintshali
70. **Blade Nzimande**
71. Weziwe Tikana-Gxotiwe
72. **Njabulo Nzuza**
73. **Reginah Mhaule**
74. **Parks Tau**
75. Ebrahim Rasool
76. **Nomasonto Motaung**
77. Olga Seate
78. Sisipho Jama
79. **Bheki Cele**
80. Onicca Moloi
81. Magesvari Govender
82. **Cyril Xaba**
83. **Thandi Modise**
84. **Lisa Mangcu**
85. **Noxolo Kiviet**
86. **Naledi Pandor**
87. Conduct Richard Hlophe
88. **Gratitude Magwanishe**
89. Mohlopi Phillemon Mapulane
90. Snuki Zikalala
91. Jacques Christian Cupido
92. Nomvuzo Mlombile-Cingo
93. Njabulo Maxwell Mtolo
94. Jido Bethuel Zunguza
95. Asanda Luwaca
96. **Kopeng Obed Bapela**
97. Mary Bernadette Ndlangisa
98. **Faiez Jacobs**
99. Masekamane Michael Mikia Ramothwala
100. Jane Seboletswe Mananiso
101. Masilo Esau Tampe
102. Bafana Uegen Manana
103. **Amos Fish Mahlalela**
104. **Regina Mina Mpontseng Lesoma**
105. **Qubudile Richard Dyantyi**
106. Thabitha Mohlala
107. Xanti Mpendulo Sithembele Jacob Sigcawu
108. **Sango Patekile Holomisa**
109. Thembelani Waltermade Thulas Nxesi
110. Nocawe Noncedo Mafu
111. Xola Anderson Pakati
112. Elizabeth Maluleke
113. Rina Joy King
114. **Thabang Makwetla**
115. Dikeledi Mahlangu
116. Sibongile Besani
117. Nakkie Valencia Makhubelo
118. Ntombovuyo Nkopane
119. **Jerome Maake**
120. **Zanele Nkomo**
121. Peter Nyoni
122. **Madala Masuku**
123. Riaan Jacques Cloete
124. **Ponani Makhubele-Marilele**
125. Phatse Justice Piitso
126. Pumla Mgidlana
127. Zolani Mkiva
128. **Mookgo Matuba**
129. **Xiaomei Havard**
130. **Fikile Majola**
131. **Lindiwe Zulu**
132. Thulani Mkhombo
133. Enock Muzi Mthethwa
134. Sewela Helen Moshobane
135. Thandi Shongwe
136. **Sahlulele Luzipo**
137. **Manketsi Tlhape**
138. **Kwati Candith Mashego-Dlamini**
139. **Phoebe Noxolo Abraham**
140. Zondi Silence Makhubele
141. Maniza Shantal Ngcobo
142. **Bridgette Tlhomelang**
143. **Machwene Semenya**
144. Bulelwa Tunyiswa
145. **Bheki Radebe**
146. Lindiwe Martha Motshwane
147. **Heinrich April**
148. **Phillip Modise**
149. Boitumelo Moiloa
150. **Dipuo Peters**
151. **Matthews Wolmarans**
152. **Nompendulo Mkhatshwa**
153. **Nombuyiselo Adoons**
154. Mildred Oliphant
155. Ragel Fransiena Louw
156. Khunjuzwa Eunice Kekana
157. China Dodovu
158. Mabuka Emmanuel Mongwe
159. Jomo Nyambi
160. **Chana Pilane-Majake**
161. Jacob Khawe
162. Molatelo Mandeline Ramakgoakgoa
163. Gaobolae Joseph Legadimane
164. **Annah Gela**
165. **Mcebisi Skwatsha**
166. **Zola Mlenzana**
167. **Claudia Ndaba**
168. **Hope Papo**
169. Maemu Fistos Mafela
170. **Duduzile Sibiya**
171. Kagisho Peace Leserwane
172. **Bongiwe Mbinqo-Gigaba**
173. Winnie Ngwenya
174. Nompumelelo Mpata
175. Siyabonga Evens Mkanzi
176. Keamotseng Stanley Ramaila
177. **Nancy Sihlwayi**
178. Nokuku Princess Miti
179. Klaas Nono Mabunda
180. **Melina Gomba**
181. Mziwonke Ndabeni
182. Ntombi Mtembu
183. Mkhacani Maxwell Chauke
184. Tania Brigitte Oldjohn
185. **Alexandra Beukes**
186. **Phori Phetlhe**
187. Beki Zacharia Ntshalintshali
188. Eric Kagisho Mokwena
189. Duduzile Promise Manana
190. Vuyelwa Dorothy Nkumbi
191. Vusumuzi Jeffrey Skosana
192. Phumla Victoria Gwebityala
193. **Ntaoleng Peacock**
194. Thulani Elvis Mphithikezi
195. Lenah Miga
196. Sthandiwe-Nathi Lancelot Khumalo
197. Vuyiwe Hani
198. **Nomathemba Maseko-Jele**
199. **Nozipho Tyobeka-Makeke**
200. Patrick Mabilo

=== Regional ===
==== Eastern Cape ====
1. Sheilla Tembalam Xego
2. Stella Tembisa Ndabeni‐Abrahams
3. Zolile Burns‐Ncamashe
4. Lindelwa Sapo
5. Mncedisi Nontsele
6. Pumelele Ndamase
7. Nqabisa Gantsho
8. Mluleki Dlelanga
9. Ntombovuyo Silberose Nkopane
10. Cedric Thomas Frolick
11. Mary‐Ann Lindelwa Dunjwa
12. Thokozile Sokanyile
13. Mzoleli Mrara
14. Nonkosi Queenie Mvana
15. Mzimasi Hala
16. Andisiwe Nangamso Kumbaca
17. Godfrey Phumulo Masualle
18. Bulelwa Tunyiswa
19. Thulani Thobela Tshefuta
20. Khalipha Motwana
21. Lindelwa Promotia Sitywantsi‐Maxegwana
22. Phumeza Theodora Mpushe
23. Desmond Davis
24. Ntombizandile Maureen Mhlola
25. Vusumzi Wellington Ntshuba

==== Free State ====
1. Seiso Joel Mohai
2. Masetshego Lenah Mofokeng
3. Sello Leon Dithebe
4. Makhotso Magdeline Sotyu
5. Dikeledi Rosemary Direko
6. Matsholo Liesbet Mmolotsane
7. Zinn Astorath Barbara Lockman
8. Tiisetso Manuel Mahlatsi
9. Thandi Vivian Tobias
10. Mzwandile Jerry Thakhudi

==== Gauteng ====
1. **Bertha Peace Mabe**
2. **Teliswa Mgweba**
3. **Anthea Ramolobeng**
4. **Walter Tebogo Letsie**
5. Mzwandile Collen Masina
6. **Tshilidzi Bethuel Munyai**
7. Judith Nemadzinga‐Tshabalala
8. **Oscar Masarona Mathafa**
9. Moleboheng Modise‐Mpya
10. Sello Meshack Maeco
11. Matsie Angelina Motshekga
12. Boyce Makhosonke Maneli
13. Nonceba Molwele
14. Cristopher Nakampe Malematja
15. Phindisile Pretty Xaba‐Ntshaba
16. Inathi Mirranda Mbiyo
17. Thokozile Elizabeth Magagula
18. Emelda Sizakele Malobane
19. Maletsatsi Christinah Ngwedzeni‐Maputla
20. Pelisa Nkunjana
21. Mfana Robert Mashego
22. Mphekelele Matthews Msibi
23. Urshula Mens
24. Matlakala Abram Mashishi
25. Simphiwe Gcwele Nomvula Mbatha
26. Bafuze Sicelo Yabo
27. Mfanimpela Ernest Dlamini
28. Tlhatlogo Moeketsi
29. Patience Moropa
30. Romeo Makoe Mokone
31. Nomvula Lesiah Mathenjwa
32. Nkhobo Khomongoe
33. Vuyo Mhaga
34. Loyiso Leon Capa
35. Maidi Dorothy Mabiletsa
36. Motlalepule Tryphina Jacobs
37. Xiaomei Havard
38. Inocent Ngobese
39. Sekeme Joel Ramalobela
40. Isaac Malihambe Bangilizwe
41. Kgoerano Decima Kekana
42. Mzomuhle Lucas Shabalala
43. Kenneth Mduduzi Mgaga
44. Sarah Kgashane
45. Stanley Itshegetseng
46. Joseph Makhubela
47. Portia Nomabali Sobantu

==== KwaZulu-Natal ====
1. Nomalungelo Gina
2. Zwelini Lawrence Mkhize
3. Nobuhle Pamela Nkabane
4. Nombuso Elizabeth Mtolo
5. Sibongiseni Maxwell Dhlomo
6. Ntuthuko Mbongiseni Sibiya
7. Shaik Imraan Subrathie
8. Dipuo Ntuli
9. Sidumo Mbongeni Dlamini
10. Lindiwe Ntombikayise Mjobo
11. Thulani Solomon Mkhombo
12. Zinhle Lucky Miya
13. Nhlakanipho Ntombela
14. Bathabile Olive Dlamini
15. Mthenjwa Amon Zondi
16. Noluthando Nyandeni
17. Edwin Bheki Mkhize
18. Lindiwe Christabola Bebee
19. Ntando Maduna
20. Fikile Eunice Khumalo
21. Innocentia Zamile Gwala
22. Enock Muzi Mthethwa
23. Cynthia Sibusisiwe Mngadi
24. Mlondolozi Archbald Mkhize
25. Ellias Mbongiseni Ngubane
26. Ntombikayise Nomawisile Sibhida
27. Nkululeko Ntuthuko Godfrey Mahlaba
28. Nomagugu Simelane‐Zulu
29. Thokozile Wilma Rosaline Hlabisa
30. Hlengiwe Goodness Slindile Mavimbela
31. Siboniso Armstrong Duma
32. Amanda Glenrose Mapena
33. Michael Mabuyakhulu
34. Zinhle Lindeka Immaculate Cele
35. Joice Nondumiso Cele
36. Tholinhlanhla Handsome Gwala

==== Limpopo ====
1. Chupu Stanley Mathabatha
2. Carol Mokgadi Phiri
3. Mosa Steve Chabane
4. Selelo Donald Selamolela
5. Nanda Annah Ndalane
6. Maakgalake Pholwane
7. Mogodu Samuel Moela
8. Nkhensani Kate Bilankulu
9. Keamotseng Stanley Ramaila
10. Mathume Joseph Phaahla
11. Livhuwani Ethel Ligaraba
12. Seaparo Charles Sekoati
13. Masefako Clarah Dikgale
14. Albert Mammoga Seabi
15. Moyagabo Paulina Bila
16. Ntholo Simon Makgato
17. Tshinanne Maria Morumudi

==== Mpumalanga ====
1. Timothy Victor Malange
2. Nomgqibelo Ethel Mashele
3. Lusizo Sharon Nkosi
4. Sipho Makhubela
5. Fisani Lillian Mahlangu
6. Gijimani Jim Shabangu
7. Julian Mokoena
8. Juliet Queen Mokoena
9. Vusumuzi Alfred Khumalo
10. Grace Kekulu Nkosi
11. Matlanatso Lydia Tseke
12. Audrey Dimakatso Moroane
13. Claudia Kedibone Maleka
14. Sharon Mahlatse Karabo Tladi
15. Linah Nkosi

==== North-West ====
1. Noble Tshiamo Jiyane
2. Betty Motebele Tshotetsi
3. Molefi David Kegakilwe
4. Itiseng Kenneth Legoete
5. Kerileng Christina Morolong
6. Nombiselo Suzan Tlhong
7. Gaolatlhe David Sompa‐Masiu
8. Masello Maatlawa Kgabo
9. Nancy Kgomotso Senne
10. Josjeph Thipe
11. Perletia Mampedi Josephine Moyo

==== Northern Cape ====
1. Sofia Tsoene
2. Erald Alzano Mosikatsi
3. Martha Cloete
4. Sharome Renay Bartlett
5. Ophaketse Edwin Van Schalkwyk

==== Western Cape ====
1. Noluthando Hantise
2. Windy Timotheus David Makasi
3. Sharon Winona Plaatjies
4. Cameron Muir Davids
5. Mzwanele Major Dugmore
6. Mathilda Michelle Sokopo
7. Boy Manqoba Bains
8. Bheki Mathews Ngubo
9. Ezelle Bianca Hadebe
10. Pamela Colleen Mankay
11. Sebenzile Harris
12. Zoleka Iris Kiva
13. Andile Moon
14. Victor Nkosinathi Lili
15. Zoliswa Caroline Mfusi
16. Xolisa Gloria Lonja
17. Mbulelo Peter
18. Beulah Nwabisa Ncedana
19. Sonwabile Hewu

=== Provincial ===
==== Eastern Cape ====
1. Ntandokazi Yolisa Capa
2. Fundile David Gade
3. Gloria Bukiwe Fanta
4. Gerald Mlungisi Mvoko
5. Lubabalo Oscar Mabuyane
6. Helen Mercedes August
7. Zolile Albert Williams
8. Loyiso Magqashela
9. Siphokazi Iris Lusithi
10. Avela Mjajubana
11. Nozibele Nyalambisa
12. Nonkqubela Ntomboxolo Pieters
13. Sindile Nimrod Toni
14. Alice Nomvula Ponco
15. Vuyo Jali
16. Nonceba Kontsiwe
17. Xolile Edmund Nqatha
18. Sibulele Ngongo
19. Makhaya Merriman Twabu
20. Koliswa Claribell Fihlani
21. Wongama Gela
22. Monde Sondaba
23. Tumeka Gaya
24. Kesava Pillai Anilkumar
25. Lindiwe Gunuza-Nkwentsha
26. Juan-Pierré Pretorius
27. Virginia Alice Camealio-Benjamin
28. Tony Duba
29. Koliswa Vimbayo
30. Thabo Matiwane
31. Asanda Tebekana
32. Mawethu Siyabulela Rune
33. Sigqibokazi Sweetness Mbonyana
34. Mpumelelo Saziwa
35. Nontutuzelo Maqubela
36. Yanga Bonga
37. Mandlakazi Keleku
38. Petros Vantyu
39. Ntombizodwa Jacqueline Gqirana
40. David Fundisile Bese
41. Patricia Nontendelezo Mankahla
42. Siyabonga Nhanha
43. Nomasikizi Hendrietta Konza
44. Mlibo Qoboshiyane
45. Anele Ernest Lizo
46. Nomabaso Gloria Ndaki
47. Ntombesine Ndabeni
48. Nozipho Jodwana
49. Thumeka Eliza Mqekelana
50. David Bunga Dyan
51. Mteteleli Emanuel Sam
52. Mawetu Pinyana
53. Themba Aubrey Xathula
54. Zinziswa Ursula Mngini
55. Sixolile Mehlomakulu
56. Ntombizodwa Patricia Mdla
57. Theophylus Mlanceli Gxaba
58. Ntombekhaya Mafungwashe Tsako
59. Khalipha Motwana
60. Mpumelelo Maxwell Khuzwayo
61. Ntombovuyo Silberose Nkopane
62. Bongani Ntontela
63. Nontombi Judith Nama
64. Bonginkosi Tshetu
65. Nolutwando Queenit Pink
66. Lukanyo Mzinzi
67. Nomfengu Siyo-Sokutu
68. Tandekile Nelson Sabisa
69. Mkakutta Clara Yekiso-Morolong
70. Siyabulela Zangqa
71. Theodora Daniswa Mafumbatha
72. Anele Winifred Ntsangani

==== Free State ====
1. Mxolisi Abraham Dukoana
2. Moses Ketso Makume
3. Maqueen Joyce Letsoha-Mathae
4. Teboho Zacharia Mokoena
5. Elizabeth Cornelia Rockman
6. Kathleen Dibolelo Mahlatsi
7. Motete Daniel Khoabane
8. Nokwanje Selina Leeto
9. Mantlhake Julia Maboya
10. Jabu Ntsokolo Ishmael Mbalula
11. Nthabiseng Julia Garekoe
12. Edwin Pitso Noe
13. Ntombizanele Beauty Sifuba
14. Zama Lucas Sigwebela
15. Nolitha Liziwe Ndungane-Dikane
16. Monyatso Viceroy Mahlatsi
17. Thabo Piet Meeko
18. Kelebogile Thulo
19. Moeketsi Basil Sesele
20. Mapule Gladys Dhlamini
21. Solomon Makhosini Msibi
22. Makalo Petrus Mohale
23. Xolile Jacob Toki
24. Lerato Elizabeth Sikisi
25. Thokozile Margaret Mokoenanyana
26. France Kosinyane Morule
27. Cecilia Thokozile Yende
28. Paki Isaac Dlomo
29. Lerotholi Lawrence Thabana
30. Martha Nozililo Ntema

==== Gauteng ====
1. Andrek Lesufi
2. Nomantu Ralehoko
3. Mbali Dawn Hlophe
4. Lebogang Isaac Maile
5. Tasneem Motara
6. Nonhlanhla Faith Mazibuko
7. Kedibone Pauline Diale-Tlabela
8. Mzikayifane Elias Khumalo
9. Bandile Edgar Wallace Masuku
10. Audrey Winifred Morakane Ketlhoilwe Mosupyoe
11. Matome Kopano Chiloane
12. Nomvuyo Memory Manamela
13. Lesego Ellis Makhubela
14. Nomathemba Emily Mokgethi
15. Monty Thulani Kunene
16. Lentheng Helen Mekgwe
17. Ntsako Kevin Mogobe
18. Boitumelo Ezra Letsoalo
19. Disego Norah Tlebere
20. Mpho Isaac Sesedinyane
21. Thulani Ndlovu
22. Moipone Khero Mhlongo
23. Matshidiso Morwa Annastinah Mfikoe
24. Phalama Jacob Mamabolo
25. Gregory David Schneemann
26. Andiswa Charlene Mosai
27. Vuyiswa Jentile
28. Tlou Caswell Chokoe
29. Mauwane Rebecca Phaladi-Digamela
30. Duitso Paul Malema
31. Machuene Joyce Boshomane
32. Thandokazi Engel Stefane
33. Hlupheka Honaurs Mukhari
34. Sara Madinoge Mogale
35. Mpho Gift Modise
36. Keneilwe Lerato Bob
37. Portia Nomabali Sobantu
38. Simphiwe George Patose
39. Amos Vusi Monyela
40. Dolly Caroline Ledwaba
41. Mlekeleli Simon Motha
42. Makhosazane Minah Mabaso
43. Esther Ntombifuthi Nhlapo
44. Sochayile Khanyile
45. Craig Johannes Cornish
46. Refiloe Johannah Kekana
47. Alphina Anna Ndlovana
48. Sanele Ngweventsha
49. Portia Johanna Mokoena
50. Kgotso Esmund Pooe
51. Mpapa Jeremia Kanyane
52. Noluthando Mahlambi
53. Annah Refilwe Mogale
54. Charmaine Masefako Ntlatlane-Nzwane
55. Ndosi Gladys Shongwe
56. Pinkie Zanele Numa
57. Joseph Norman Radebe
58. Neliswa Kazana Mdaka
59. Mpumelelo Zengani
60. Aggie Ndivhuho Sekoba
61. Mcebisi Moyeni
62. Sithembile Ruth Sibeko
63. Sylvia Mcungeli
64. Isaac Sello Mphaga
65. Sebenzile Pertunia Mhlongo
66. Sikelelwa Clara Sodlulashe-Mwenze
67. Phumeza Mangcu
68. Lovemore Chauke
69. Isabela Anna Ramasilo
70. Moalusi Morake
71. Ngwanapule Margaret Malele
72. Thandi Virginia Mdlalose
73. Nandipha Greseleta Tselanyane
74. Morakane Dora Mlambo
75. Mervyn Lindani Mtshali
76. Theresa-Eulenda Mabusela

==== KwaZulu-Natal ====
1. Siboniso Armstrong Duma
2. Nomagugu Simelane-Zulu
3. Siphosihle Emmanuel Hlomuka
4. Mbalenhle Cleopatra Frazer
5. Sizophila Mpilo-Iyaqhubeka Magnficent Mkhize
6. Hlengiwe Goodness Slindile Mavimbela
7. Bangokwakhe Madesius Zuma
8. Nontembeko Nothemba Boyce
9. Nkululeko Ntuthuko Godfrey Mahlaba
10. Mthandeni Eric Dlungwana
11. Zamokwakhe David Nxumalo
12. Fikile Andiswa Masiko
13. Celiwe Qhamkile Madlopha
14. Mafika Damane Mndebele
15. Bongiwe Nomusa Moloi
16. Zinhle Lindeka Immaculate Cele
17. Vincent Madoda Myeni
18. Amanda Glenrose Mapena
19. Richard Themba Mthembu
20. Makhosazane Promise Patience Zungu
21. James Sikhosiphi Nxumalo
22. Vuyiswa Precious Caluza
23. Goodman Khonzuyise Ngidi
24. Nomakiki Roseline Majola
25. Rejoice Zibuyisile Phumlile Zulu
26. Zwelidumile Freeman Baleni
27. Khanyisa Ntombikayise Gwanya
28. Sazi Nelson Ndwalane
29. Maniza Shantal Ngcobo
30. Raymond Zwelakhe Langa
31. Nomsa Dube-Ncube
32. Rosebud Ntombiyenkosi Ngubane
33. Bhekinhlanhla Vikayiphi Ntuli
34. Samkelisiwe Falandile Nandi Ndlovu
35. Tholinhlanhla Handsome Gwala
36. Emmanuel Vusumuzi Dube
37. Ntombikayise Nomawisile Sibhida
38. Themba Sibonelo Mtshali
39. Magesvari Govender
40. Alfred Siphiwe Mazibuko
41. Gloria Nonzwakazi Swartbooi-Ntombela
42. Thulani Vincent Xulu
43. Nwabisa Dano
44. Mondli Abednego Chiliza
45. Octavia Nolubabalo Zondi
46. Nhlakanipho Ntombela
47. Nozipho Phillistasia Funaziphi Mavuso
48. Mbali Pearl Myeni
49. Mpumelelo Amon Zulu
50. Joice Nondumiso Cele
51. Sifiso Musawenkosi Sonjica
52. Zibuyisile Fortunate Dlamini
53. Sithembiso Wiseman Mshengu
54. Senzekile Gladness Mngwengwe
55. Lehlonono Cyprian Moloi
56. Sibongile Tryphina Khathi
57. Michael Vusumuzi Ntshangase
58. Siphesihle Precious Zungu
59. Phumzile Harriet Cele
60. Mlondolozi Archbald Mkhize
61. Judith Ntombikayise Gaga
62. Nosipho Rose Mkhize
63. Michael Mabuyakhulu
64. Nonhlanhla Matrinah Nomathemba Gabela
65. Sanele Zakhele Masuku
66. Doreen Nontokozo Sibiya
67. Ian Thina Ngubane
68. Sibongile Clementine Nelisiwe Mdakane
69. Remegius Sizwe Cele
70. Monitha Dolly Shandu
71. Sbusiso Richard Mhlongo
72. Zinhle Lucky Miya
73. Sibongiseni Mkhize
74. Lusanda Khanya Zwane
75. Simangele Rejoyce Thabethe

==== Limpopo ====
1. Phophi Constance Ramathuba
2. Nakedi Grace Kekana
3. Thabo Andrew Mokone
4. Tshitereke Baldwin Matibe
5. Ernest Sebataolo Rachoene
6. Constance Ramadimetja Kupa
7. Falaza Philemon Mdaka
8. Mahlodi Caroline Mahasela
9. Khathutshelo John Netshifhefhe
10. Shimane Morris Mataboge
11. Maseko Solomon Pheedi
12. Mavhungu Maureen Lerule-Ramakhanya
13. Dieketseng Masesi Mashego
14. Dikeledi Josephine Mmetle Ramohlola
15. Makoma Grace Makhurupetje
16. Chuene William Dissagree Malebana
17. Mosibudi Esther Mokoele
18. Susani Violet Mathye
19. Kgabo Elias Mahoai
20. Nanda Annah Ndalane
21. Fulufhelo Florence Radzilani
22. Gloria Dzunisani Mnisi
23. Chritian Nkakareng Rakgoale
24. Simon Matsobane Mathe
25. Rodgers Basikopo Makamu
26. David Mmakgabo Champ Sepuru
27. Essob Mmanoko Mokgonyana
28. Seanego Tumelo Sebopela
29. Funani Jerry Maseko
30. Maudu Johannes Phokane
31. Mapula Annah Mokaba-Phukwana
32. Tebogo Portia Mamorobela
33. Mpho Godfrey Mudau
34. Germinor Delly Matjomane
35. Gannye Rodgers Monama
36. Dowelani Alton Nenguda
37. Mankwana Christinah Mohale
38. Che Bonnie David Selane
39. Leswafo Joshua Matlou
40. Thabo Mabotja
41. Mihloti Ethel Muhlope
42. Hassani Peter Ngobeni
43. Mpho Sonnyboy Shai
44. Kedibone Margret Lebea
45. Midiavhathu Prince Kennedy Tshivhase
46. Phetole Percy Machethe
47. Thambeleni Colbert Nempumbuluni
48. Vongani Wesly Maringa
49. Makua Asnad Matjomane
50. Bongani Abednigo Nkonyana
51. Wireless Daniel Sedibeng
52. Elna Japisa Mathonsi
53. Kolobe Regina Molokomme
54. Sanny Ndhlovu
55. Malesela Frans Mokwele
56. Reneiloe Rosemarry Molapo
57. Mfiti Jeremia Ngobeni
58. Agrey Ernest Mboweni
59. Moloi Samuel Motshegoa
60. Nkome Sarah Monyamane
61. Thinawanga Selinah Mbedzi
62. Matodzi Elisa Shavhani
63. Mmatlala Sarah Ledwaba

==== Mpumalanga ====
1. Mandla Padney Ndlovu
2. Speed Katishi Mashilo
3. Sasekani Janet Manzini
4. Nompumelelo Evidence Hlope
5. Thulasizwe Simon Thomo
6. Makhosazane Christine Masilela
7. Khesani Jackie Macie
8. Lindi Lettie Masina
9. Refilwe Maria Mtshweni-Tsipane
10. Lucky Aaron Mbuyane
11. Jesta Sidell
12. Fana Vincent Mlombo
13. Landulile Chathrine Dlamini
14. Tshidiso Ready Nkonyane
15. Daniel Pitoli Nkosi
16. Thulisile Swenky Khoza
17. Mandla Jeffrey Msibi
18. Sam Masango
19. Bonakele Amos Majuba
20. Munene Nhluvuko Mhlongo
21. Brenda Khethiwe Moeketsi
22. Sipho Samuel Mahlangu
23. Vusumuzi Robert Shongwe
24. Sonto Martha Malepeng
25. Desmond Lawrence Moela
26. Stephens Thapelo Sekoakoa
27. Eva Ntombizodwa Makhabane
28. Thabile Sylvia Masondo
29. Leah Martha Mabuza
30. Sekoele Aubrey Maboea
31. Life Ramodise Monini
32. Faith Hlagala
33. Prince Vusumuzi Mkhatshwa
34. Cecilia Sylvia Nxumalo
35. Gladys Mosibodi Monama
36. Lindiwe Mahlangu
37. Mohita Latchminarain
38. Busisiwe Paulina Shiba
39. David Sibusiso Nhlabati
40. Abel Daantjie Nkosi
41. Smart Lucky Ndinisa
42. Norah Mahlangu
43. Gugulethu Nomndeni Immaculate Motha
44. Lazaros Vusi Mashaba
45. Linkie Mohlala
46. Makhazasi Elinacia Radebe
47. Nokuthula Gift Vilakazi
48. Bafana Johannes Ndinisa
49. Selina Mashigo-Sekgobela
50. Blessing Thandi Shongwe
51. Martha Busi Hlumbane

==== North-West ====
1. Jonas Sello Lehari
2. Kenetswe Norah Mosenogi
3. Lazarus Kagiso Mokgosi
4. Sempe Elizabeth Mokua
5. Wessels Mosimanegape Morweng
6. Ntsetsao Viola Motsumi
7. Madoda Sambatha
8. Motlalepula Ziphora Rosho
9. Mokone Collen Maine
10. Tebogo Constance Modise
11. Paul Mosetlha Sebegoe
12. Tinah Priscilla Williams
13. Russel Sipho Dial
14. Sussana Rebecca Dantjie
15. Gaoage Oageng Molapisi
16. Galerekwe Tsotso Virginia Tlhapi
17. Elias Maseneke Smuts Matshe
18. Sebonta Francinah Desbo Mohono
19. Kgalalelo Makgokgowa
20. Keobiditse Evelyn Bitsa Lenkopane
21. Tshepo George Khoza
22. Mpho Elias Khunou
23. Karabo Tebogo Magagane
24. Theolonuis Nat Nathan Oliphant
25. Jostina Mmantina Mothibe
26. Molefe Witness Morutse
27. Sylvia Losea Sithole
28. Tlhokantlhe Hendrik Botha
29. Nomtsama Lenah Miga
30. Daniel Kabelo Mataboge
31. Jacob Molosiwa Seitisho
32. Mmoloki Saviour Cwaile
33. Nthabiseng Dephney Shuping
34. Ephraim Lepomane
35. Sindiswa Nomonde Scheepers
36. Arone Motswana
37. Connie Lesedi Makhubela
38. Marcia Kutlwano Morupi

==== Northern Cape ====
1. Zamani Saul
2. Fufe Makatong
3. Bentley Vass
4. Limakatso Koloi
5. Maruping Lekwene
6. Venus Blennies
7. Mangaliso Matika
8. Newrene Klaaste
9. Abraham Vosloo
10. Nontobeko Vilakazi
11. Mervin John Cloete
12. Mase Manopole
13. Zolile Monakali
14. Norman Shushu
15. **Mirriam Kibi**
16. Desery Finies
17. Tsaone Macdonald Dehuis
18. Dineo Doris Leutlwetse-Tshabalala
19. Lebogang Motlhaping
20. Lorraine Senye
21. Gift van Staden
22. Elsie Xabendlini
23. Solomon Joseph Kgopotso Legodi
24. Nomandla Bloem
25. Andile Coneliys Phololo
26. Kenalemang Eunice Bojosi
27. Geswind Matieso
28. Monwabisi Lincholn Nkompela
29. **Sharome van Schalkwyk**
30. Victor Siphiwo Dolopi

==== Western Cape ====
1. Ayanda Bans
2. Rachel Windvogel
3. Mangesi Benson Ngqentsu
4. Muhammad Khalid Sayed
5. Pat Lekker
6. Francois Kamfer
7. Nobulumko Nkondlo
8. Beauty Nomawa Stoffel
9. Patrick Marran
10. Wesley Daniel Seale
11. Sipho Silas Rataza
12. Gladys Bakubaku-Vos
13. Lumka Tamboer
14. Lulama Lennox Mvimbi
15. Suzanne Piedt
16. Hendrick Latola
17. Asafika Sinethemba Mzinjana
18. Bulelani Justice Penxa
19. Thando Dedezane
20. Anele Gabuza
21. Ntombomzi Mjajubana
22. Nombulelo Ntsunguzi
23. Bulelwa Benedictor Ntoyanto
24. Tsepo Richard Moletsane
25. Mpumelelo Norman Lubisi
26. Ella-Zean Chris-Jean Farao
27. JJ Johannes Saolomon Januarie
28. Joyce Sizeka Sakati
29. Jean Jacques Van Rooyen
30. Phelisa Sitshoti
31. Glenys Nomawethu Gushman
32. Sindiswa Masumpa
33. Bongiwe Blossom Mkhwibiso
34. Monwabisi Gregory Rataza
35. Abraham Bekeer
36. Mfuzo Zenzile

== African Transformation Movement ==
=== National ===
1. **Vuyolwethu Zungula**
2. **Thandiswa Linnen Marawu**
3. Mandisa Joy Mashiya
4. Malefetsane Aubrey Katsana
5. Nosisa Mayaba
6. Zama Mlindeni Ntshona
7. Gladys Ntumba
8. Nomapelo Veronica Nodwengu
9. Solomon Samuel Ngomane
10. Nkosinathi Kuseni
11. Nyaniso Jeku
12. Nomagubevu Emma Mbali
13. Lubabalo Cecil Magwentshu
14. Ayanda Kati
15. Louisa Adelina Banze
16. Sindile Joseph Kave
17. Nonhlanhla Athelida Keswa
18. Celebration Ntungwa
19. Khutala Nokwali
20. Perseverance Kwanele Sisilana
21. Nolufefe Mampofu
22. Nomputumi Beaurra Galadla
23. Phumeza Mhambi
24. Solomzi Ndzumo
25. Siyolise Rangwetsi
26. Sikho Seyamo
27. Fikile Mcetywa
28. Olwethu Dlamini
29. Joyce Ndileka Gabela
30. Lulama Lettie Mbalo-Chigonde
31. Promise Mantombi Mvula
32. Tenjiwe Ngayo
33. Matthews Sikhululekile Nani
34. Thembinkosi Moses Professor Radebe
35. Nobalulekile Maureen Mampofu
36. Sikhanyiso Tonise
37. Ntsika Mkono
38. Thembinkosi Washington Gama
39. Simbonile Nkomonye
40. Luyanda Khaboyise Msipha
41. Michael Tando Ntonga
42. Ndumiso Sebenza Mgunya Mvula
43. Mxolisi Makhubo
44. Ayanda Madodebunga Faku
45. Mcebisi Atherston Seyamo
46. Nomthandazo Simangele Nsele
47. Siyabulela Jojo
48. Kolekile Goodwin Matuntuta
49. Akhona Katsana
50. Jobe James Radebe
51. Silondile Mabhude
52. Christina Thumeka Nonjojo
53. Shiyekile British Novas
54. Mxolisi Goodman Phephu
55. Dumisane Louis Kubeka
56. Daniel Trom
57. Michael Nceba Njenxa
58. Nokwamkela Beatrice Mteki
59. Sydwell Nkosibonye Ngqanekana
60. Fanie Mokoena
61. Lulamile Zanemvula Gxara
62. Andiswa Jaku
63. Veronica Mamobishopo Nkxoyi
64. Sipokazi Cecilia Menzeleleli
65. Enos Mongameli Mbanga
66. Portia Ntombizodwa Madisha
67. Ria Siphokazi Mfumba
68. Vuyelwa Makubalo Mxokozeli
69. Annah Sithole
70. Vuyokazi Panca
71. Kgobuki Excellent Mfisa
72. Gloria Pamela Sithole
73. Khuselo Paul Moshane
74. Sabelo Ignatious Mvuyana
75. Nkareng Abraham Moloi
76. Mandisa Fezeka Phakathi
77. Nkuselo Mngeni
78. One Anathi Dumalisile
79. Sihle Gcora
80. Dumisani Victor Mthembu
81. Nomaphelo Andelinah Ndzwanana
82. Lungisani Sibawana
83. Sizwe Richard
84. Msutukazi Mbali
85. Mampho Ndzumo
86. Andile Twenani
87. Lubabalo Gqaza
88. Sitembile Patrick Mampofu
89. Reginald Tshongweni
90. Eric Mthombeni
91. Goitsemang Russel Thompson
92. Gqweta Jack Jacobs
93. Laurelle Nicole Bernon
94. Wiseman Rebese
95. Arthur Sizwe Mgole
96. Sizeka Nosasa
97. Sizeka Mlindazwe
98. Leon Landingwe Rozani
99. Nomonde Patience Kondlo
100. Unati Mabovula
101. Leonard Makalima Mjokovane
102. Kayakazi Mbalane
103. Bellicia Bongelwa Nxusani
104. Kutala Princess Dlokweni
105. Bonga Mxokozeli
106. Andile Martin Sawule
107. Thandile Felicity Cobo
108. Linda Nomalanga Somnono
109. Lesego Molefe
110. Mokgadi Marble Kgatla
111. Sandile Njingalwazi Ntonga
112. Reginald Sebastian Wagner
113. Phumelele Christopher Boqwana
114. Andile Notshokovu
115. Siyabonga Maphini
116. Bongani Poswa
117. Kesetselemang Gladys Vena
118. Primrose Notemba Manyokole
119. Masivuyisane Bekameva
120. Nomzamo Phindile Mzamo
121. Bonga Ngoyi
122. Fumanekile Norexe
123. Njabulo Nhlanhla Treasure Mvula
124. Thandokazi Nyangiwe
125. Marks Musaveni Shivuri
126. Sello Suprise Muila
127. Budabupangwa Cyprian Nokwali
128. Bongani Ngubane
129. Fundiswa Vivian Penduka
130. Tshabello Julius Diniso
131. Ncebakazi Magaxa
132. Leonard Sizakele Toto
133. Nasiwe Dorris Makalima-Fuzile
134. Thozama Mcosini-Beliwe
135. Andile Thusi
136. Khayelihle Mrulwa
137. Bawinle Skosana
138. Mfiswa Aubrey Thusi
139. Temba Sigila
140. Zolani Mabukula
141. Mhlabeni Ngqamakwe
142. Simazile Mxenge
143. Edwin Bongile Sothembe
144. Khanyisa Mtilana
145. Edward Sokoli Masingi
146. Bonginkosi Mziwenkosi Zulu
147. Hani Masuvhelele
148. Luxolo Mtsolongo
149. Kitimi Silas Molefe
150. Vuyani Mnyamana
151. Blessing Kunaka
152. Dineo Sarah Mokonyane
153. Cathrine Mpho Serole
154. Yandisa Mgwarubana
155. Mosima Salome Mathekga
156. Seun Samuel Sitswai
157. Jan Mojalefa Moilwa
158. Vuyile Gorayi
159. Pamella Mbendeni
160. Bulelani Zakade
161. Dinah Tshikumbane
162. Nobanzi Elizabeth Mdlalo
163. Philile Templeton Renene
164. Nobafundi Makeleni
165. Zimasa Songezile Fuzile
166. Madibeletje Ben Chuene
167. Eric Vusumuzi Matshiane
168. David Ngwenya
169. Sibabalwe Nongqunga
170. Anathi Delihlazo
171. Nomsa Khoni Skhosana
172. Paul Sekhobe Mohale
173. Siyabonga Thuthukani Ntumba
174. Johan Mabhuti Nsimbini
175. Thandiwe Thulisile Sanah Ndlela
176. Ayanda Echimael Mokoena
177. Happy Matlotleng Khoza
178. Fikile Florence Fakude
179. Senzeni Cynthia Madi
180. Nompumelelo Patricia Ndlovu
181. Mamosebetsi Genious Khanye
182. Mecky Anton Manyiki
183. Patrick Noko
184. Yakie Mathebula
185. Jabulile France
186. Dikeledi Jenett Khoathane
187. Linda Tlhobo
188. Benedict Manuel Mpiti
189. Lebohang Ernest Jonas
190. Doctor Peter Maduna
191. Mochu Jankie Malia
192. Mamethe Julia Sefo
193. Mokhethi Abram Mokhethi
194. Mojalefa Petros Mokoena
195. Mathlodi Beresita Nteo
196. Tshokolo Michael Khumalo
197. Anathi Tyoko
198. Mbulelo Xolani Ntsizana
199. Siphelele Giqo
200. Thandeka Sheilia Matshabana

=== Regional ===
==== Eastern Cape ====
1. Ndodomzi Christian Sokomani
2. Lubabalo Nteyi
3. Thandiwe Sikwebu
4. Mavis Thandiwe Jokwana
5. Bukelwa Monica Ncanywa
6. Themba Twenani
7. Salatiso Mdakane
8. Mbongeni Wyndham Damane
9. Nocwaka Ntungwa
10. Thabang Singleton Kuali
11. Nophelo Nteboeng Magwala
12. Nolubabalo Grace Nkele
13. Nosivatho Christina Bangelo
14. Ayanda Dickson Ndamase
15. Paulina Bukelwa September
16. Bethwell Mdingi
17. Celiwe Hlumayo
18. Mandisa Patricia Ngewu
19. Andile Nxele
20. Boniwe Pelepele
21. Leonard Makalima Mjokovane
22. Lettitia Weziwe Tsutsu
23. Nolindo Langasiki
24. Nomathokazi Tshandu
25. Staff Tyolo

==== Free State ====
1. Busisiwe Cynthia Moloi
2. Diau Klaas Sefatsa
3. Portia Pelisa Mngqibisa
4. Dineo Petronella Pelle
5. Thamsanqa William Mbakaza
6. Tuku Sarah Mosekedi
7. Taedi Frank Ntsane
8. Nthabiseng Sarah Moloi
9. Boraki Jonas Mkhwane
10. Tankiso Ishmael Moilwa

==== Gauteng ====
1. Melusi Moyo
2. Judet Mtombeni
3. Godfrey Delicate Thulani Mthembu
4. Nozolile Mabhenxa
5. William Siko
6. Fani James Malinga
7. Sharon Fundisiwe Mazibuko
8. Eunice Bongi Ngobeni
9. Madoda Mcdonald Mnyani
10. Bhekani Lecture Msimanga
11. Busisiwe Merry Thobela
12. Somikazi Elizabeth Nkonyeni
13. Zuko Gungqwa
14. Pumza Madela
15. Basanda Xhantilomzi Nondlazi
16. Lesiba Jones Khumalo
17. Fikelephi Mathe
18. Sylvia Malevu
19. Matshego Catherine Maganyele
20. Gcinumuzi Martel Gule
21. Manityi Petrus Saliwa
22. Alfred Motlogelwa Legoase
23. Themba David Masuku
24. Noluthando Desiree Maseko
25. Nontethelelo Dunywa
26. Princess Thuli Nakana
27. Thabiso Nick Masango
28. Mzwandile Alfred Jack
29. Slumko Wiseman Mfihlo
30. Alfred Bafana Mkwanazi
31. Karabo Shilakwe
32. Bokang Paul Radile
33. Simphiwe Orlando Mdingi
34. Sandiso Bhuda
35. Tebogo Bodigelo
36. Sithembiso Mabaso
37. Phillender Brenda Molebatsi
38. Macaleni Thomas Mtimkulu
39. Khensani Ndhlovu
40. Mondli Sihlwayi
41. Nomaphelo Andelinah Ndzwanana
42. Marks Musaveni Shivuri
43. Jabulani Simon Hlatshwayo
44. Maphelo Onesmus Makasi
45. Mboniseni Excellent Mvelase

==== KwaZulu-Natal ====
1. Julius Ndaba
2. Bhekithemba Elphas Mavundla
3. Erick Mthokozisi Mthembu
4. Themba Freddy Mbutho
5. Clement Bongani Mvuyana
6. Hilaria Nombuso Khambule
7. Velani Baldwin Mzobe
8. Richard Mndiyata
9. Lindani Thedeus Mngadi
10. Wilbard Nqoba Zindela
11. Dumazile Eunice Ngidi
12. Thulani Derrick Gwala
13. Buyiswa Sigwili
14. Thabani Mzikayise Panda
15. Mandlenkosi Derick Sikobi
16. Yandiswa Fortunate Mazeka
17. Ziyanda Leonard Phakathi
18. Happiness Zulu
19. Sibusiso Christopher Mncwabe
20. Khayelihle Mrulwa
21. Pinkie Carol Ndlela
22. Thokozani Thenjiwe Memela
23. Nonhle Christobel Mthuli
24. Nomzamo Unicia Mkhatshane
25. Mpho David Tsotetsi
26. Elias Jilasi
27. Thulasizwa Joseph Zulu
28. Kwanele Siyabonga Wiseman Ngobese
29. Nelisiwe Nomonde Memela
30. Rosia Jacob Lubanyana
31. Lindani Mthethowakhe Phungula
32. Nontobeko Shange
33. Sibusiso Zulu
34. Athini Runeli
35. Psychology Sikhosiphi Sibisi
36. Nomlindelo Prudence Sikhosana
37. Elliot Nhlawa Ntombela
38. Nosibusiso Sidumile Myeni
39. Siyabonga Mxiza
40. Thembelani Perfect Zubenathi Ntuli
41. Kwanele Mzileni

==== Limpopo ====
1. Gushman Xola Gubuza
2. Lencelot Khoza
3. April Thwadi Komane
4. Butshabelo Agnes Mabunda
5. Kulani Sydney Maluleke
6. Strois Jack Hlagala
7. Kwena Caroline Molema
8. Mmaphuti Janeth Modisa
9. Philang Malope
10. Lina Nora Madikologa
11. Ntsako Gannily Shikwambana
12. Wilson Mmakwena Mojela
13. Kgobuki Excellent Mfisa
14. Mmakgabo Viola Phaho
15. Mapula Francina Seapele
16. Maria Matlhodi Sekanka
17. Moneri Comet Mathekga

==== Mpumalanga ====
1. Njabulo Nkuna
2. Ethel Cilikati Zanele Nkosi
3. Dennis Steven Moyane
4. Joseph Russel Mapanga
5. Phumzile Promise Sifunda
6. Richard Solly Zitha
7. Charmaine Tebogo Nkosi
8. Nonoki Elizabeth Kambule
9. Khulekani David Mtshali
10. Nompumelelo Tryphina Kambule
11. Sipho Aaron Mashinini
12. Nomathemba Betty Mqwathi
13. Nelly Khabonina Mkhwanazi
14. Mpho Mofokeng
15. Sandy Fanny Mota

==== North-West ====
1. Lesego Molefe
2. Sello Abraham Qhina
3. Segwabe George Tau
4. Elias Lekgotla Setuke
5. Chonepi Peter Lubisi
6. Mboneni Mphikeleli
7. Thobile Mapitiza
8. Nkosifikile Ncapai
9. Sabelo Madondile

==== Northern Cape ====
1. Hlopheheng Andrina Mazibuko
2. Liziwe Joyce Trom
3. Thembile Van Der Westhuizen
4. Andile Maxwele
5. Themba Andries Mbudlela

==== Western Cape ====
1. Lindelwa Ndevu
2. Bennett Gaveni
3. Nkosilungile Lolwana
4. Thando Wenzi
5. Ntombizodwa Dephney Msomi
6. Nkosi Josef Ngubenkosi
7. Siyambonga Sibusiso Dalasile
8. Siyabonga Mdimbaza
9. Zandile Princess Mntuyedwa
10. Zuko Zakhe
11. Zukisani Khohliwe
12. Sivenathi Kili
13. Zukisani Mbiko
14. Songile Hoya
15. Sonwabise Ndzule
16. Mziwamadoda Wiseman Mpisane
17. Nosibusiso Simelane
18. Melumzi Skosana
19. Herman Ntshitshi
20. Thembelani Ncewula
21. Tembalethu Matwele
22. Zolani Mabukula
23. Zikhona Mazantsana
24. Bulelani Zakade

=== Provincial ===
==== Eastern Cape ====
1. Gcobani Wesley Ntobongwana
2. Nelson Madod'odwa Mampofu
3. Mmamogari Cathrine Moji
4. Mkhanyiseli Gumede
5. Sonwabile Professor Kati
6. Sinalo Catherine Mbi
7. Siphiwo Vincent Galadla
8. Nobulali Lusizi
9. Desmond Mabandla Dlokweni
10. Velile Pantsi
11. Zwelijikile David Mbanga
12. Nobayethe Mboni
13. Oldjohn Siyabonga Busakwe
14. Nosipho Mani
15. Bonginkosi Bakana
16. Sisipho Elona Jama
17. Mongezi Majeke
18. Nokwazi Qotoyi
19. Patience Nosipo Mdemka
20. Sicelo Solani
21. Vumile Michael Cukatha
22. Delekile Reginald Mqanda
23. Nozuko Nani
24. Sibusiso Sisilana
25. Nontle Mfunda
26. Thulani Nqwiliso
27. Nokubonga Gola-Ntame
28. Beauty Galadla
29. Yandisa Phephu
30. Phumlani Alex Dubase
31. Duduzile Princess Jojo-Mkeme
32. Blossom Zizo Feke
33. Phumlani Vincent Kettledas
34. Bongeka Matyolweni
35. Phila Ntantiso
36. Nosisa Mda
37. Lubabalo Gqaza
38. Phelokazi Ethel Ntombini
39. Lulama Botomani
40. Bonga Sipungu
41. Vuyolwethu Danunu Jucwa
42. Bongeka Kapok
43. Nontombi Mtsotso
44. Litha Sizani
45. Jabulile France
46. Xabisokazi Kabeli
47. Sisanda Jonga-Banjwa
48. Portia Nomabulu Lwana
49. Vuyani Forteen Ndovela
50. Yolisa Muriel Ntshinka
51. Anastalcia Nokhayeletu Daliwe
52. Sizeka Joseph
53. Mahlubandile Armstrong Mbasa
54. Esethu Dlanjwa
55. Mandisi Xhongo
56. Mvuyisi Xhalabile
57. Sonwabile Ntola
58. Ntombiyakhe Ngxanzana
59. Nolubabalo Grace Nkele
60. Mlulami Simon Gqwesa
61. Nomzamo Londile
62. Ziphathe Pudini
63. Nokauineti Kutala Ngongo
64. Victoria Nothembekile Malongwe
65. Nyameko Zweni
66. Dunyiswa Manakaza
67. Veronica Mkhakha
68. Nokulunga Ngoma
69. Nomnikelo Mchathwa
70. Monwabisi Ntanjana
71. Notemba Roslin Nikelwa Benene
72. Thandile Felicity Cobo

==== Free State ====
1. Katsane Godffrey Katsana
2. Mathafeng Johannes Jaas
3. Moya Patrick Tsolo
4. Thokozile Jessey Keiso
5. Lindiwe Lizzy Nzinzana
6. John Molahlehi Mofokeng
7. Buti Kleinjan Matsemela
8. Nozizwe Aletta Moremi
9. Thapelo Alfred Lephondo
10. Kaneko Stephaans Mashiya
11. Beauty Nozimanga Jantjie
12. Sheila Jabulile Tshabalala
13. Kgathatso John Motlomelo
14. Mzonani Piet Khulu
15. Mvuyo Alfred Rondo
16. Thembeka Rebecca Damane
17. Nkareng Abraham Moloi
18. Maletsatsi Rosy Sotyato
19. Jakobus Cornelius Wolvaardt
20. Bhekinkosi Samuel Ndaba
21. William Robin Vetter
22. Ndodomzi Herbert Damane
23. Litabe Ephraim Monatisa
24. Fanie Mokoena
25. Ponki Josephine Zwane
26. Mercy Ncebakazi Fiphaza
27. Maria Ngubelanga
28. Johannes Aomeng Koloku
29. John Tekane May
30. Nombulelo Cynthia Tau

==== Gauteng ====
1. Elliot Mabaso
2. Landikaya Noveve
3. Busi Sylvia Moloi
4. Mtimandi Ernest Ngwenya
5. Vuyokazi Portia Kori
6. Wanda Sidwell Maseko
7. Wellington Phalali Mabote
8. Elliot Mzamo Thintwa
9. Delisiwe Petunia Mabena
10. Sello Tumelo
11. Mangwadime Maria Maganyele
12. Mapula Jeritha Legodi
13. Bonginkosi Victor Vellem
14. Winnie Ntombifuthi Mashupye
15. Ntsikelelo Owen Malindzi
16. Enos Mongameli Mbanga
17. Elkin Sinki Mashupye
18. Zanele Baleni
19. Rebone Maganyele
20. Patrick Sonwabo Mbundwini
21. Maphelo Onesmus Makasi
22. Nkateko Reginald Vuma
23. Magauta Girly Motloung
24. Nelane Paul Tafani
25. Oscar Esbie
26. Mokgadi Maggie Mabjana
27. Doris Sibongile Mbele
28. Mmorwana Ariel Madisha
29. Nomveliso Mshweshwe
30. Mirriam Nomthandazo Busisiwe Tshabalala
31. Zamokwakhe Desmond Shabalala
32. Noah Makhafola
33. Nozipho Alida Thobela
34. Simphiwe Orlando Mdingi
35. Nomfesane Ntsindantsinda
36. Godfrey Delicate Thulani Mthembu
37. Monica Edenia Gwebu
38. Zolisa Nompandana
39. Khayalethu Goodman Nkwenkwezi
40. Nthwalo Joseph Matshedisho
41. Nduma Anthony Chamo
42. Lwazi Macingwane
43. Ntandazo Dodsworth Mtebele
44. Lebogang Salome Rampai
45. Mahlomola David Ralehlathe
46. Tanduxolo Kwayimani
47. Sibongile Evelyn Mavuka
48. Tebogo Bodigelo
49. Khumbudzo Arthur Mavhungu
50. Zanele Msezane
51. Evelyn Nomvula Ndonga
52. Bathandwa Kwinana
53. Karabo Neo Mofokeng
54. Dimakatso Pinkie Masopha
55. Molifi Diamond Letlojane
56. Lindani Godknow Buthelezi
57. Motsamai Arthur Moeki
58. Pulane Esther Masango
59. Reneilwe Tiny Thupane
60. Charity Bomi Baleni
61. Loyiso Nombanga
62. Rhulani Enock Khoza
63. Themba Sydney Sibeko
64. Vuyo Ncedo Chuma Lwazi Ntshiba
65. Benjamin Thabiso Twala
66. Kedibone Thandine Bakers
67. Yandipha Nombangwana
68. Nozolile Mabhenxa
69. Thuto Makamole
70. Kagiso Ivia Hlengani
71. Lusindiso Mboyiya
72. Nkosinathi Blessing Masango
73. Andile Victoria Ledwaba
74. Bafana Memory Tshabalala
75. Sithembiso Innocent Buthelezi
76. Lungani Mthethwa
77. Thomas Sbangwana

==== KwaZulu-Natal ====
1. Mxolisi Ewart Phakathi
2. Lwazi Evidence Nkomeni
3. Contantia Ntombizamabhele Mvula
4. Bhekinhlahla Jeremia Mnyandu
5. Abegail Nozipho Mzize
6. Benny Obed Masondo
7. Nomfundo Princess Ngobese
8. Nonopa Rala
9. Nthabiseng Antionett Moloko
10. Vincent Vusumuzi Buthelezi
11. Themba Freddy Mbutho
12. Siyabonga Mhlongo
13. Promise Nosithembiso Zondi
14. Peter Samuel Mabaso
15. Prudentia Dlamini
16. Sthembiso Joshua Hlongwa
17. Nkosinathi Lawrence Mkhwanazi
18. Philile Prudence Shozi
19. Eza Ndinani Gadudu
20. Sanele Gceba
21. Zwebhukhanya Derrick Thengwayo
22. Erick Mthokozisi Mthembu
23. Michael Thembuyise Sibisi
24. Mduduzi Ernest Khoza
25. Bongani Ngubane
26. Mbongiseni Wiseman Suduka
27. Sawa Simon Sakhela
28. Elias Jilasi
29. Sanele Siyethemba Gift Ximba
30. Cyprian Jabulani Qedi Radebe
31. Princess Philisiwe Myaka
32. Sibusiso Steven Gansa
33. Goodenough Nkosinathi Mfeka
34. Yonela Mzize
35. Celiwe Pretty Maqhajana
36. Fatima Mahlangu
37. Thokozani Thenjiwe Memela
38. Thamsanqa Ngcobo
39. Khumbulani John Ngubane
40. Happy Thembisile Shezi
41. Goodman Thabani Ngcongo
42. Mfanafuthi Sabelo Vezi
43. Ndabenkulu Douglas Mthuli
44. Nelisiwe Nomonde Memela
45. Sikhulile Nokubekezela Mbatha
46. Kwanele Siyabonga Wiseman Ngobese
47. Xolani Hlengwa
48. Mncedisi Innocent Nkosi
49. Amos Zithulele Mkhize
50. Nokukhanya Shelly Mkhize
51. Thulasizwa Joseph Zulu
52. Mduduzi Abednego Buthelezi
53. Linda Jeffery Ngubane
54. Mpho Tecla Mdlozini
55. Thabiso Zinyani
56. Lindani Mthethowakhe Phungula
57. Nthabiseng Violet Khumalo
58. Sanelisiwe Sithole
59. Thembela Nair Nxele
60. Nonhle Christobel Mthuli
61. Nontobeko Shange
62. Bongani Mkhasibe
63. Robert Katiso Letlaila
64. Lusanda Vacubana
65. Qala Ukona Asaya Mvumbi
66. Mbongeni Erasmus Mndali
67. Phelokazi Patience Menziwa
68. Ncamisile Grace Shabalala
69. Nelisiwe Khanyisiwe Gwala
70. Njabulo Muziwok'uthula Ngema
71. Mphumeleli Robin Thobela
72. Likho Hlophe
73. Andile Thusi
74. Mandla Kenneth Kheswa
75. Mbongeni Bethwell Hadebe
76. Bongani Patrick Dumakude
77. Nomusa Coretor Dhlamini
78. Nomthandazo Simangele Nsele
79. Velani Baldwin Mzobe
80. Lerato Carol Rawlins

==== Limpopo ====
1. Masilo Given Isaack Sebetha
2. Gushman Xola Gubuza
3. Kgadi Rebecca Foromo
4. Kholisile Khomotso Phahla
5. Nokuthula Princess Poswa
6. Dinah Raisibe Nyama
7. Machuene Paulina Majadibodu
8. Fumani Mathevula
9. Nyimpini James Masingi
10. Vamanuka Evelyn Mosima
11. Zimisele Ntozini
12. Machokwe Reuben Setati
13. Surprise Magolego
14. Sbongile Suzan Baloyi
15. Butshabelo Agnes Mabunda
16. Chuene Andries Mabala
17. Billy Tjia
18. Judith Makhosazana Mohlala
19. Mokibelo Bernard Masera
20. Bongani Poswa
21. Selelo Creshelder Kgatla
22. Thabiso Never Machete
23. Mokgatjana Lethabo Kgatla
24. Lindelwa Mcutu
25. Justice Ngwepe
26. Vuyiseka Mbube
27. Regina Daisy Kgasago
28. Sentshu Jackton Chokoe
29. Lina Lebogang Khutuma
30. Bonginkosi Sitezi
31. Nthu Victor Dibetso
32. Dineo Mamoshiane Athalia Naape
33. Nicollete Palisa Mamuthamani
34. Maxy Lebang Ramaremisa
35. Grace Sikwana
36. Boredi Maremo Hlagala
37. Lerato Sarah Chabalala
38. Reinet Ramothakwe
39. Olwethu Chenge
40. Phethego God-Frey Mokgonyana
41. Eleck Elisa Ntoambe
42. Ephraem Tsietsi Sekanka
43. Baleseng Minah Dibetso
44. Tebogo Angelina Semenya
45. Boye Frans Masehela
46. Kabelo Moleke Somo
47. Mokgadi Rina Kgaka
48. Lebolo Stephen Ditle
49. Nkomi Lucy Ralepelle
50. Busisiwe Shirley Lebepe
51. Nchichipa Solomon Mametja
52. Fanny Mfana Masilela
53. Thapelo Stephen Motau
54. Lydia Mosekwa Madimetse
55. Mmalehu Elizabeth Mokoane
56. Kate Thandi Mokwena
57. Rose Nomadlozi Mathibela
58. Anna Rhulani Baloyi
59. John Baloyi
60. Modjadji Abigail Sekgobela
61. Thapelo Nestor Ramothwala

==== Mpumalanga ====
1. Mandla Solomon Ntumba
2. Mfanufikile Johan Nkosi
3. Khethiwe Ened Mkhatshwa
4. Nomthandazo Ottelia Ngqanekana
5. Phori Ephraim Khanye
6. Sibongile Geminah Gama
7. Sarah Mkelo
8. Mcebisi Goodmind Mazibuko
9. Thato Peter Motaung
10. Nonhlanhla Precious Maseko
11. Andile Praysworth Ngwenya
12. Portia Boniwe Mthimkulu
13. Lerato Sellina Dayimani
14. Enoch Sibusiso Khoza
15. Zakhele Donald Khoza
16. Sebolelo Maria Mosoeunyane
17. Nicholas Phanuel Tibane
18. Brian Tefo Mayisela
19. Sophie Dume Mtsweni
20. Zinhle Thabele Pretty Ntumba
21. Banele Lucas Dludlu
22. Elisie Syzeth Maseko
23. Thandiwe Thulisile Sanah Ndlela
24. Nkosinathi Joseph Tshabangu
25. Den August Masilela
26. Calvin Ntsheng Magudu
27. Silence Sipho Ndubane
28. Angel Nomvula Mathebula
29. Fikile Sylvia Mathebula
30. Petros Shenene Dhlamini
31. Charmaine Tebogo Nkosi
32. Thandi Joyce Msimanga
33. Queen Rebotile Mokwena
34. Nompumelelo Pearl Ngwane
35. Mahlatse Gift Mtsweni
36. Thabo Mashiloane
37. Musawenkosi Bethwell Thango
38. Lucas Gumbeni Mucassi
39. Bhekizizwe Mpostoli Ndaba
40. Nonhlanhla Mabila
41. Nomathemba Betty Mqwathi
42. Khulekani David Mtshali
43. Nhlanhla Goodenough Ngwenya
44. Elizabeth Mamosinwa Mothopeng
45. Pheladi Stephinah Motsepe
46. Thandeka Paulinah Miya
47. Lydia Nkamsile Buthelezi
48. Njabulo Nkuna
49. Lucky Sipho Khoza
50. Sydwell Nkosibonye Ngqanekana
51. Nonoki Elizabeth Kambule

==== North-West ====
1. Thembela Yolisile Mdluli
2. Sello Abraham Qhina
3. Thandeka Lucia Ndleleni
4. Siseko Wiseman Mxabo
5. Katlego Mathews Mabiletsa
6. Malamabe Jacob Sesing
7. Phyllis Nomanda Bikisha
8. Mzuvukile Mpongo
9. Hypertia Sepeng
10. Fezeka Baba
11. Puleng Sylvia Nkash
12. Naardes Sebuile Didimalang
13. Mongezi Daniel Mdluli
14. Anela Bambeni
15. Tebogo John Molefe
16. Selina Tshegofatso Mokawane
17. Dikalo Freddy Mogorosi
18. Cathrine Mpho Serole
19. Jan Mojalefa Moilwa
20. Mfanyana Johannes Maketekete
21. Elisa Betty Thakadu
22. Segwabe George Tau
23. Kgomotso Motshedise Vivian Molawa-Mokgoje
24. Japhtalia Funane
25. Ongeziwe Molise
26. Sibusiso Derieck Flietoor
27. Nomthandazo Manina
28. Simon Thabo Molise
29. Lebogang Nadia Matjila
30. Theodor William Bouwer

==== Northern Cape ====
1. Gertrude Trom
2. Abel Delihlazo Sekonyane
3. Makhosazana Hellen Khumalo
4. April Mokhosi
5. Elizabeth Moleboheng Sekonyane
6. Manyemi James
7. Xolile Attwel Tyandela
8. Bontle Senyacho
9. Lisolihle Welemtsha
10. Ntsikelelo Mneno
11. Weziwe Nxumalo
12. Rathabo George Tsoelesa
13. John Manzana
14. Katlego Booysen
15. Everline Nthofela Ramakhena
16. Pieter Collins
17. Boipelo Ginett Malope
18. Rosivita Kativa
19. Andile Maxwele
20. Victor Mziwanele Mammeshi
21. Nkosikhona King Rebese
22. Delisile Nomusa Sithole

==== Western Cape ====
1. Sisa Pambaniso
2. Dumisani Livingstone Ximbi
3. Thandiswa Maki
4. Zolani Oscar Mkhonde
5. Babalwa Dyidi
6. Elliot Zwelentshaba Qhokolo
7. Thobane Damane
8. Fanelwa Nora Blaweni
9. Mveleli Lourence Bixa
10. Mhlekazi Dlova
11. Mlungisi Sydney Khwela
12. Vuyiswa Yvonne Kawana
13. Siyanda Windasi
14. Noxolo Mercy Masizani
15. Yondela Tyawa
16. Phumzile Yekani
17. Wanda Yose
18. Siyabonga Mdimbaza
19. Nthabeleng Francina Keiso
20. Mvuyisi Khulwini
21. Msawenkosi Xinwa
22. Wongalethu Gxakaza
23. Phumla Ngqeku
24. Zibonele Michael Caji
25. Matululu Sihlo
26. Mandriva Lidziya
27. Avuziwe Nkxoyi
28. Portia Lolwana
29. Ntombexolo Sylvia Fanti
30. Bongile Maki
31. Zolile Alex Ndevu
32. Khululwa Adoration Njara
33. Vuyokazi Mkhonde
34. Ncebakazi Maxesha
35. Ntombizodwa Dephney Msomi
36. Veli Mangondwana
37. Ntombosindiso Jack
38. Ntombifuthi Mlindi
39. Fanelekile Zanemfuyo Langa
40. Alicia Meyer
41. Shiela Cotoyi
42. Mhlabeni Ngqamakw

== Al Jama-ah ==
=== National ===
1. **Mogamad Ganief Ebrahim Hendricks**
2. Imraan Ismail-Moosa
3. Kabelo Gwamanda
4. Shameemah Salie
5. Shamiela Orrie
6. Ramla Ruwa
7. Phillip Dhlamini
8. Shehryar Ahmed Khan
9. Ghairoennisaa Hendricks
10. Faizal Muckdoom Khan
11. Galil Brinkhuis
12. Moegamat Faried Achmat
13. Fairouz Nagia
14. Muhammed Haron
15. Mpho Kgomosotho
16. Thapelo Amad
17. Muhammad Asghar Khan
18. Mohammed Hoosen Khan
19. Goodwill Mfanufikile Cele
20. Wilhelmina May Lutuli
21. Ishmael Vuyisile Gqamane
22. Mu-Eed Fakie
23. Nazea Salie
24. Zulfa Aranes
25. Shamila Ely
26. Shamsunissa Sablay
27. Shamsaard Begum Khan
28. Nizaam Dalwai
29. Ummesalmah Nzeyimana
30. Lwando Njadayi
31. Vuyiseka Godola
32. Faizal Jassiem
33. Precious Lebo Mkhabela
34. Mkhohliswa Meisie Afrika
35. Eniccah Nteki Matome
36. Reply Magwaza Khoza
37. Bennet Joko
38. Tawfeeq Ely
39. Riaan Pietersen
40. Shafiek Nolan
41. Ayesha Bibi Allie Allie-Patel
42. Magmoed Kajie
43. Maryam Gqamane
44. Mohamed Zaid Allie Allie
45. Achmad Hendricks
46. Abdur-Razaaq Majal
47. Yassien Fortune
48. Gafsa Samodien
49. Fazilah Kamish
50. Mogammat Magodien Samodien
51. Fatimah Morgan
52. Sharon Avril Rose Claassen
53. Anwar Sadat Abrahams
54. Faheem Mohamed
55. Naeem Mohamed
56. Gadija Erasmus
57. Gadija De Vries
58. Gasan Brinkhuis
59. Sedick Jacobs
60. Reza Van Schalkwyk
61. Zoerydah Khan
62. Yasmin Khan
63. Zaiboonisa Khan
64. Rasheeq Williams
65. Nathmi Salie
66. Moegamat Yunus Karriem
67. Fagmeda Jattiem
68. Majdie Salie
69. Freddie Wilson
70. Daphney Siphokazi Boco
71. Sohail Manga
72. Siphesihle Ayanda Jele
73. Ben Thulo Mpholo
74. Yakoob Karolia
75. Shiraz Adam
76. Hoosein Khan
77. Farhin Delawala
78. Itani Ratshitanda
79. Mandla Kenneth Mazibuko
80. Thando Freda Mabuza
81. Letlotlo Jacob Ranyathole
82. Aubrey Peter Ntuli
83. Riaz Mahomed Randeree
84. Kiamodien Khan
85. Khadiga Latiff
86. Sakhile Comfort Nxumalo
87. Khumbulani Sicelo Kunene
88. Cromwell Siphamandla Ntozakhe
89. Happiness Mdlaka
90. Vusi Alfred Mhlamvu
91. Sanelisiwe Jojisa
92. Zakia Butt
93. Muhammad Iftikhaar Khan
94. Kassim Dawood Latiff
95. Abdool Kader Dawood
96. Lindani Siza Sibiya
97. Kabelo Ashly Nthekiso
98. Mmakgomo Bernice Mpye
99. Thandiwe Suzan Masheane
100. Richard Kgakatse
101. Ofentse Donald Motshoane
102. Kamogelo Vicario Visagie
103. Boipelo Gladys Mpye
104. Christinah Mqoqwane
105. Mpho Mlala
106. Thabiso Mhlongo
107. Calvin Tshepang Sekgopi
108. Lemogang Theophilus Nkwe
109. Boipelo Yvette Phologane
110. Gregory Thabang Gaotlhongwe
111. Kealeboga Godwin Sedimo
112. Tsumbedzo Ntenge
113. Saiti Ntola
114. Ntsoaki Sannah Motloung
115. Mpho Joseph Mkhabela
116. Kgashane Confidence Malatji
117. Giyani Michael Baloyi
118. Mohammed Shafik Suleman
119. Abu Milanzi
120. Thinavhuyo Reckson Malise
121. Thandi Paulina Ramoadi
122. Ephanse Rambuwani
123. Lorraine Phiri
124. Karabo Hutamo
125. Tenia Monareng
126. Mmatseleng Rosina Malatji
127. Sedima Salphy Maraka
128. Mohlatlego Francinah Matuba
129. Jerome Mdyolo
130. Bethuel Thulani Dhlamini
131. Nokwanda Veronica Mlalandle-Zulu
132. Veliswa Mgqibelo
133. Lungisani Alfred Kobo
134. Sibusisile Njingolo
135. Yanga Mqushul
136. Nomatamsanqa Venus Ndabazandile
137. Lynette Gcasamba
138. Lydia Nantombi Pinana
139. Dominic Mzwamele Nohaku
140. Zandile Mbinyashe
141. Lwazi Brendan Mseleni
142. Siphelele Jakavula
143. Mziyanda Dyasi
144. Luvuyo Ngqavu
145. Lulama Mirriam Quntana
146. Athenkosi Sokoyi
147. Vuyolwetu Wendy Ntantiso
148. Ncedile Ngalipi
149. Mzukisi Sokoyi
150. Bulelwa Theora Mkhosana
151. Thembisile Manyela
152. Asemahle Zweni
153. Mzwandile Toli
154. Xolani Lennox Tembani
155. Neliwe Veronica Matshoba
156. Thulani Ncete
157. Abongile Matiwane
158. Nonkongozelo Eunice Mdikana
159. Nongetheni Betty Booi
160. Ayangezwa Ndamase
161. Saleem Hassan
162. Zaheer Moosa
163. Thabang Bernard Mabena
164. Abdul Majiet Amien
165. Lorenzo Ivan Donavan Van Niekerk
166. Nantal Mario Hopley
167. Milicent Mmantsie Ramphisa
168. Neliswa Paslinah Phangindawo
169. Tshepo George Abram Tolo
170. Reagan Forest Chirwa
171. Robert Eric Lethabo Maleka
172. Bonginkosi Trevor Nkwana
173. Esther Nkuna
174. Tebogo Patricia Ramphisa
175. Stephen Makhombe
176. Faiza Moosa

=== Regional ===
==== Eastern Cape ====
1. Faizal Jassiem
2. Ayangezwa Ndamase
3. Athenkosi Sokoyi
4. Ummesalmah Nzeyimana
5. Lulama Mirriam Quntana
6. Yanga Mqushulu
7. Lwazi Brendan Mseleni
8. Zezethu Stemele
9. Thulisa Cynthia Gulwa

==== Gauteng ====
1. Mpho Kgomosotho
2. Kabelo Gwamanda
3. Shehryar Ahmed Khan
4. Thapelo Amad
5. Imraan Ismail‐Moosa
6. Mandla Kenneth Mazibuko
7. Thando Freda Mabuza
8. Letlotlo Jacob Ranyathole
9. Aubrey Peter Ntuli
10. Daphney Siphokazi Boco
11. Milicent Mmantsie Ramphisa
12. Neliswa Paslinah Phangindawo
13. Reagan Forest Chirwa
14. Tshepo George Abram Tolo
15. Robert Eric Lethabo Maleka
16. Bonginkosi Trevor Nkwana
17. Esther Nkuna
18. Tebogo Patricia Ramphisa

==== KwaZulu-Natal ====
1. Riaz Mahomed Randeree
2. Kiamodien Khan
3. Wilhelmina May Lutuli
4. Khadiga Latiff
5. Muhammad Asghar Khan
6. Mohammed Hoosen Khan
7. Goodwill Mfanufikile Cele
8. Faizal Muckdoom Khan
9. Sakhile Comfort Nxumalo
10. Khumbulani Sicelo Kunene
11. Cromwell Siphamandla Ntozakhe
12. Happiness Mdlaka
13. Vusi Alfred Mhlamvu
14. Sanelisiwe Jojisa
15. Zakia Butt
16. Muhammad Iftikhaar Khan
17. Kassim Dawood Latiff
18. Abdool Kader Dawood
19. Lindani Siza Sibiya

==== Limpopo ====
1. Kgashane Confidence Malatji
2. Ntsoaki Sannah Motloung
3. Mohammed Shafik Suleman
4. Abu Milanzi
5. Thinavhuyo Reckson Malise
6. Giyani Michael Baloyi
7. Ephanse Rambuwani
8. Lorraine Phiri
9. Karabo Hutamo
10. Tenia Monareng
11. Mmatseleng Rosina Malatji
12. Sedima Salphy Maraka
13. Mohlatlego Francinah Matuba

==== North West ====
1. Tsumbedzo Ntenge
2. Richard Kgakatse
3. Ofentse Donald Motshoane
4. Mmakgomo Bernice Mpye
5. Kabelo Ashly Nthekiso
6. Thandiwe Suzan Masheane
7. Boipelo Gladys Mpye
8. Christinah Mqoqwane
9. Mpho Mlala
10. Thabiso Mhlongo
11. Kamogelo Vicario Visagie
12. Calvin Tshepang Sekgopi
13. Lemogang Theophilus Nkwe

==== Western Cape ====
1. Mogamad Ganief Ebrahim Hendricks
2. Yusuf Khan Dalwai
3. Shameemah Salie
4. Fairouz Nagia
5. Faiza Moosa
6. Saleem Hassan
7. Ghairoennisaa Hendricks
8. Ramla Ruwa
9. Maryam Gqamane
10. Mogammat Magodien Samodien
11. Shafiek Nolan
12. Ayesha Bibi Allie Allie‐Patel
13. Muhammed Haron
14. Tawfeeq Ely
15. Riaan Pietersen
16. Mohamed Zaid Allie Allie
17. Abdur‐Razaaq Majal
18. Yassien Fortune
19. Gafsa Samodien
20. Fatimah Morgan
21. Sharon Avril Rose Claassen
22. Zaheer Moosa
23. Thabang Bernard Mabena
24. Abdul Majiet Amien

=== Provincial ===
==== Eastern Cape ====
1. Jerome Mdyolo
2. Bethuel Thulani Dhlamini
3. Nokwanda Veronica Mlalandle-Zulu
4. Veliswa Mgqibelo
5. Ummesalmah Nzeyimana
6. Lungisani Alfred Kobo
7. Sibusisile Njingolo
8. Yanga Mqushulu
9. Nomatamsanqa Venus Ndabazandile
10. Lynette Gcasamba
11. Faizal Jassiem
12. Vuyiseka Godola
13. Lwando Njadayi
14. Lydia Nantombi Pinana
15. Dominic Mzwamele Nohaku
16. Zandile Mbinyashe
17. Lwazi Brendan Mseleni
18. Siphelele Jakavula
19. Mziyanda Dyasi
20. Luvuyo Ngqavu
21. Lulama Mirriam Quntana
22. Athenkosi Sokoyi
23. Vuyolwetu Wendy Ntantiso
24. Ncedile Ngalipi
25. Mzukisi Sokoyi
26. Bulelwa Theora Mkhosana
27. Thembisile Manyela
28. Asemahle Zweni
29. Mzwandile Toli
30. Xolani Lennox Tembani
31. Neliwe Veronica Matshoba
32. Thulani Ncete
33. Abongile Matiwane
34. Nonkongozelo Eunice Mdikana
35. Nongetheni Betty Booi

==== Gauteng ====
1. Thapelo Amad
2. Shehryar Ahmed Khan
3. Mpho Kgomosotho
4. Hoosein Khan
5. Milicent Mmantsie Ramphisa
6. Freddie Wilson
7. Daphney Siphokazi Boco
8. Imraan Ismail-Moosa
9. Sohail Manga
10. Siphesihle Ayanda Jele
11. Ben Thulo Mpholo
12. Yakoob Karolia
13. Shiraz Adam
14. Farhin Delawala
15. Itani Ratshitanda
16. Neliswa Paslinah Phangindawo
17. Tshepo George Abram Tolo
18. Robert Eric Lethabo Maleka
19. Bonginkosi Trevor Nkwana
20. Esther Nkuna
21. Tebogo Patricia Ramphisa

==== KwaZulu-Natal ====
1. Muhammad Asghar Khan
2. Mohammed Hoosen Khan
3. Habeeb Milanzi
4. Abdool Kader Dawood
5. Wilhelmina May Lutuli
6. Riaz Mahomed Randeree
7. Faizal Muckdoom Khan
8. Goodwill Mfanufikile Cele
9. Khadiga Latiff
10. Kassim Dawood Latiff
11. Adelle Pillay
12. Khumbulani Sicelo Kunene
13. Cromwell Siphamandla Ntozakhe
14. Happiness Mdlaka
15. Vusi Alfred Mhlamvu
16. Sanelisiwe Jojisa
17. Zakia Butt
18. Muhammad Iftikhaar Khan
19. Lindani Siza Sibiya
20. Kiamodien Khan

==== Limpopo ====
1. Saiti Ntola
2. Ntsoaki Sannah Motloung
3. Mpho Joseph Mkhabela
4. Kgashane Confidence Malatji
5. Giyani Michael Baloyi
6. Mohammed Shafik Suleman
7. Abu Milanzi
8. Thinavhuyo Reckson Malise
9. Thandi Paulina Ramoadi
10. Ephanse Rambuwani
11. Lorraine Phiri
12. Karabo Hutamo
13. Tenia Monareng
14. Mmatseleng Rosina Malatji
15. Sedima Salphy Maraka
16. Mohlatlego Francinah Matuba

==== North-West ====
1. Kabelo Ashly Nthekiso
2. Mmakgomo Bernice Mpye
3. Thandiwe Suzan Masheane
4. Richard Kgakatse
5. Ofentse Donald Motshoane
6. Kamogelo Vicario Visagie
7. Boipelo Gladys Mpye
8. Christinah Mqoqwane
9. Mpho Mlala
10. Thabiso Mhlongo
11. Calvin Tshepang Sekgopi
12. Lemogang Theophilus Nkwe
13. Boipelo Yvette Phologane
14. Gregory Thabang Gaotlhongwe
15. Kealeboga Godwin Sedimo
16. Deborah Onalenna Jackson
17. Clinton Oratile Moiloe
18. Obakeng Excellent Seabelo
19. Hendreck Sanyboy Visagie
20. Keabetswe Tsepe

==== Western Cape ====
1. Mogamad Ganief Ebrahim Hendricks
2. Galil Brinkhuis
3. Moegamat Faried Achmat
4. Fairouz Nagia
5. Shameemah Salie
6. Nathmi Salie
7. Nantal Mario Hopley
8. Bennet Joko
9. Muhammed Haron
10. Moegamat Nasiegh Latief
11. Shafiek Nolan
12. Tawfeeq Ely
13. Riaan Pietersen
14. Ayesha Bibi Allie Allie-Patel
15. Ghairoennisaa Hendricks
16. Magmoed Kajie
17. Ramla Ruwa
18. Maryam Gqamane
19. Fatimah Morgan
20. Mohamed Zaid Allie Allie
21. Achmad Hendricks
22. Yassien Fortune
23. Gafsa Samodien
24. Abdur-Razaaq Majal
25. Mogammat Magodien Samodien
26. Sharon Avril Rose Claassen
27. Anwar Sadat Abrahams
28. Faheem Mohamed
29. Naeem Mohamed
30. Gadija Erasmus
31. Gadija De Vries
32. Gasan Brinkhuis
33. Sedick Jacobs
34. Reza Van Schalkwyk
35. Zoerydah Khan
36. Yasmin Khan
37. Rasheeq Williams
38. Moegamat Yunus Karriem
39. Fagmeda Jattiem
40. Majdie Salie
41. Nizaam Dalwai
42. Lorenzo Ivan Donavan Van Niekerk

== Build One South Africa With Mmusi Maimaine ==
=== National ===
1. Mmusi Aloysias Maimane
2. Nobuntu Lindumusa Webster
3. Ayanda-Allie Allie
4. Kathryn Leigh Berman
5. Stevens Mokgalapa
6. Mogale Daniel Diseko
7. Ntokozo Mondli Biyela
8. Roger Freddy Solomons
9. Kwendile Sikhosana
10. Eloise Laura Briggeman
11. Lumka Mquqo
12. Lesige Benjamin Motsukunyane
13. Madiseng Terrance Phala
14. Sizwe Mthokozisi Skhosana
15. Foteini Maria Du Toit
16. Lemogang Ethel Nkomo
17. Sarah Ntebogeng Sikhosana
18. Richard Baleseng Moheta
19. Pamela Samantha Cunningham
20. Zondi Timothy Maluleke
21. Wayne Jonathan Bennett
22. Malope Martha Moshiga
23. Willeum Khoza
24. Tyron Pillay
25. Samuel Mamphaka Nnyahlane Molapo
26. Emmanuel Munyai
27. Kerryn Lynn Rehse
28. Ntombenhle Innocentia Gcebile Khathwane
29. Keitumetse Pole
30. Dikeledi Dorah Ditabo
31. Howard Keaitumela Gabonewe
32. Phindile Maureen Msomi
33. Thokozile Precious Miya
34. David Mclaughlin
35. Siphuthando Ndalwenhle Andile Nyandeni
36. Arthur Edward Tissong
37. Matshidisi Florah Votyeka
38. Abel Matshidiso Tau
39. Ezekiel Uwe Maunatlala
40. Teboho Vincent Ramanamane
41. Dumisani Bheki Hlatshwayo
42. Nomvume Temperance Gwele
43. Luyanda Clifford Moyeni
44. Mokhine Wilson Mathabatha
45. Douw Bernard Meyer
46. Rian Paulsen
47. Kgabashai Thabitha Mahlatji
48. Monnamoholo Jeremia Lenake
49. Molefi Johannes Maleme
50. Tania Coenraad
51. Bandile Vusikhaya Ngcolomba
52. Liphapang Petrus Melato
53. Joseph Moshwane Mokgalaka
54. Mduduzi Welcome Nhlebela
55. Sandile Bokfela
56. Wandisile Abongile Mvenya
57. Florence Gabaza Maunatlala
58. Athenkosi Tyapha
59. Geoffrey Tshibvumo
60. Vusumuzi Venon Shongwe
61. Motlanalo Julia Maluleke
62. Siyabonga Sanele Vusi Mlaba
63. Kanyile Maxwell Sobantu
64. Khangelani Emanuel Magengenene
65. Thabiso Daniel Leolo
66. Henry Thabo Masuku
67. Samuel Sello Maimane
68. Dorothy Melissa Visser
69. Tebogo Zeldah Moses
70. Catherine Moshibutsane Choung
71. Lerato Madisa
72. Maliwa Elias Mncube
73. Leonette Ackermann
74. Boy-Boy Alfred Thotha
75. Nare Victor Makgoka
76. Maxhoba Nicholas Buwa
77. Jan Tshehang Sefuthi
78. Byron Malefane Morakile
79. Thabang Clement Chauke
80. Brilliant Sekepani
81. Cynthia Gomotsegang Phoko
82. Avela Robert Mnyaka
83. Maite Martha Chewe
84. Karabo Electious Votyeka
85. Zwelakhe Simelane
86. Goden Mongezi Sontshatsha
87. Nikilitha Mxinwa
88. Nhlakanipho Lindokuhle Mchunu
89. Thabiso Edwin Nonyane
90. Kwacha Geshom Nhlema
91. Mfundo Vincent Simelane
92. Lungile Ethel Mathe
93. Joseph Selaotswe Matlaba
94. Mohammed Nabeel Khan
95. Daisy Mametjie Masiapata
96. Yolande Stober-Smith
97. Rasekhoro Michael Letutu
98. Bafedile Julia Mosadi
99. Kgomaredi George Mathibeng
100. Lydia Mpho Lebepe
101. Dilahlwane Lisbeth Maleho
102. Mamoloko Lesley Kgare
103. Armstrong Thanduxolo Mbili
104. Abner Siphiwo Zeyo
105. Haneefa Opperman
106. Tebogo Raymond Monyela
107. Jeffrey Mmangaliso Ndlangisa
108. Senkgane Agnes Mogopodi
109. Lerato Lovendale Diseko
110. Itumeleng Sydney Ramagaga
111. Mmatsheko Ambrocia Diseko
112. Gift Kabelo Lioma
113. Marilyn Mokitsi Kekana
114. Mmakedikile Ushula Rampou
115. Audrey Motlagomang Keitsemore
116. Magdeline Sindiswa Mbangula
117. Palesa Sharol Mothupi
118. Mahuhudi Mpho Ivy Seotlollo
119. Paulina Makoloane Lesane
120. Monica Bungane-Ngcizela
121. Mbulelo Edwin Njova
122. Avuxeni Tyala
123. Yiva Sitole
124. Sephiwe Millicent George
125. Hermanus Felix Reed
126. Lebogang Victor Ditsebe
127. Lindelwa Diphahe
128. Shadrack Vakele Bobe
129. Lisebo Lerato Pearl Ramabulana
130. Nicole Rochelle Booysen
131. Florence Ingrid Bartlett
132. Piet Boitumelo Moselane
133. Dudley Emile Bouwer
134. Sukoluhle Ndunyana
135. Tembela Winnifred Constance Madikazi

=== Regional ===
==== Eastern Cape ====
1. Maxhoba Nicholas Buwa
2. Avuxeni Tyala
3. Luyanda Clifford Moyeni
4. Athenkosi Tyapha
5. Khangelani Emanuel Magengenene
6. Sukoluhle Ndunyana
7. Tembela Winnifred Constance Madikazi
8. Yiva Sitole
9. Monica Bungane‐Ngcizela
10. Mbulelo Edwin Njova

==== Free State ====
1. Mogale Daniel Diseko
2. Teboho Vincent Ramanamane
3. Monnamoholo Jeremia Lenake
4. Liphapang Petrus Melato
5. Jan Tshehang Sefuthi
6. Rasekhoro Michael Letutu
7. Dilahlwane Lisbeth Maleho
8. Senkgane Agnes Mogopodi
9. Lerato Lovendale Diseko
10. Itumeleng Sydney Ramagaga

==== Gauteng ====
1. Mmusi Aloysias Maimane
2. Ayanda‐Allie Allie
3. Kathryn Leigh Berman
4. Stevens Mokgalapa
5. Lesige Benjamin Motsukunyane
6. Sizwe Mthokozisi Skhosana
7. Foteini Maria Du Toit
8. Lemogang Ethel Nkomo
9. Richard Baleseng Moheta
10. Malope Martha Moshiga
11. Ntombenhle Innocentia Gcebile Khathwane
12. Keitumetse Pole
13. Dikeledi Dorah Ditabo
14. Howard Keaitumela Gabonewe
15. Phindile Maureen Msomi
16. Ezekiel Uwe Maunatlala
17. Nomvume Temperance Gwele
18. Douw Bernard Meyer
19. Molefi Johannes Maleme
20. Thabiso Daniel Leolo
21. Henry Thabo Masuku
22. Samuel Sello Maimane
23. Dorothy Melissa Visser
24. Tebogo Zeldah Moses
25. Lerato Madisa
26. Maliwa Elias Mncube
27. Boy‐Boy Alfred Thotha
28. Nare Victor Makgoka
29. Byron Malefane Morakile
30. Thabang Clement Chauke
31. Cynthia Gomotsegang Phoko
32. Avela Robert Mnyaka
33. Zwelakhe Simelane
34. Nikilitha Mxinwa
35. Thabiso Edwin Nonyane
36. Kwacha Geshom Nhlema
37. Kgomaredi George Mathibeng
38. Lydia Mpho Lebepe
39. Mamoloko Lesley Kgare
40. Tebogo Raymond Monyela

==== KwaZulu-Natal ====
1. Ntokozo Mondli Biyela
2. Eloise Laura Briggeman
3. Pamela Samantha Cunningham
4. Tyron Pillay
5. Siphuthando Ndalwenhle Andile Nyandeni
6. Arthur Edward Tissong
7. Rian Paulsen
8. Mduduzi Welcome Nhlebela
9. Siyabonga Sanele Vusi Mlaba
10. Kanyile Maxwell Sobantu
11. Nhlakanipho Lindokuhle Mchunu
12. Mfundo Vincent Simelane
13. Lungile Ethel Mathe
14. Mohammed Nabeel Khan
15. Armstrong Thanduxolo Mbili

==== Limpopo ====
1. Zondi Timothy Maluleke
2. Samuel Mamphaka Nnyahlane Molapo
3. Emmanuel Munyai
4. Mokhine Wilson Mathabatha
5. Geoffrey Tshibvumo
6. Madiseng Terrance Phala
7. Kgabashai Thabitha Mahlatji
8. Joseph Moshwane Mokgalaka
9. Motlanalo Julia Maluleke
10. Catherine Moshibutsane Choung
11. Maite Martha Chewe
12. Goden Mongezi Sontshatsha
13. Daisy Mametjie Masiapata

==== Mpumalanga ====
1. Willeum Khoza
2. Dumisani Bheki Hlatshwayo
3. Vusumuzi Venon Shongwe
4. Brilliant Sekepani

==== North West ====
1. Matshidisi Florah Votyeka
2. Karabo Electious Votyeka
3. Joseph Selaotswe Matlaba
4. Bafedile Julia Mosadi
5. Piet Boitumelo Moselane
6. Jeffrey Mmangaliso Ndlangisa

==== Northern Cape ====
1. Matshidisi Florah Votyeka
2. Sephiwe Millicent George
3. Hermanus Felix Reed
4. Lebogang Victor Ditsebe
5. Lindelwa Diphahe
6. Shadrack Vakele Bobe

==== Western Cape ====
1. Roger Freddy Solomons
2. Kwendile Sikhosana
3. Lumka Mquqo
4. Sarah Ntebogeng Sikhosana
5. Wayne Jonathan Bennett
6. Kerryn Lynn Rehse
7. Thokozile Precious Miya
8. David Mclaughlin
9. Tania Coenraad
10. Bandile Vusikhaya Ngcolomba
11. Sandile Bokfela
12. Wandisile Abongile Mvenya
13. Leonette Ackermann
14. Yolande Stober‐Smith
15. Haneefa Opperman

== Congress of the People ==
=== National ===
1. **Mosiuoa Gerard Patrick Lekota**
2. **Teboho Loate**
3. Ntombomzi Catherine Sikhakhane
4. Ouneas Dikgetsi
5. Sarah Amelia Soxokashe
6. Roelof Johannes Pretorius
7. Carol Van Staden
8. Pieter Van Sens
9. Vuyelwa Gloria Num
10. Philly Aschendorf
11. Koos Esau
12. Lazarus Boitumelo Gaobuse
13. Morongoe Theresia Matsolo
14. Mawezo Arthur Ketile
15. Mpho Theodora Kgositlou
16. Mahummed Lowrence Khan
17. Diana Tsobotsi Khomoeasera
18. Makhasane Dina Maluleke
19. Keadimilwe Alfred Lebepe
20. Lehlohonolo Nicolus Leeto
21. Madodomzi Manina
22. Thabiso Philimon Mabetwa
23. Nompumelelo Octavia Madonsela
24. Mokgadi Valentine Maila
25. Matome Moses Maila
26. Xolile Majiyezi
27. Francois Jacques-Pierre Malan
28. Moyahabo Dina Maphoto
29. Vutivi Octavia Mayimele
30. Civilian Vutomi Maranele
31. Thembinkosi Wisdom Masina
32. Molisana David Masuhlo
33. Ntimane Luckson Mathebula
34. Vusi Oscar Mauda
35. Webster Mbasa Ntongana
36. Hamphrey Brown Mnisi
37. Thomas Mofokeng
38. Sekedi Reginah Mokgolobotho
39. John Motlhware Mokome
40. Molatlhegi Samuel Molaetsi
41. Gaopalelwe Precious Molete
42. Molahlehi Philemon Molupe
43. Tholo Elias Motaung
44. Lindiwe Mtembu
45. Simon Ndobe
46. Elisa Nkobore
47. Nicholas Mlungisi Notshaya
48. Kenneth Ziwongile Ntola
49. Simon Mabutsa Phaladi
50. Mpatheli Terrence Pikoli
51. Kholeka Christian Qampi
52. Luxolo Qampi
53. Silas John Ramashia
54. Makgwana Arnaus Rampedi
55. Mudalahothe Florah Randela
56. Bonakele Mathews Sani
57. Mphonyana Joel Sebetoane
58. David Kgotlaetsile Seleke
59. Siphiwe Sibiya
60. David Pogiso Thiba
61. Marius Jacques Van Reenen
62. Zwelithini Bleki
63. Xolile Zweni

=== Regional ===
==== Eastern Cape ====
1. Mpatheli Terrence Pikoli
2. Zanemvula Jabavu
3. Madodomzi Manina
4. Roelof Johannes Pretorius
5. Pieter Van Sens

==== Free State ====
1. Puseletso Witness Rampoli
2. Mphonyana Joel Sebetoane
3. Morongoe Theresia Matsolo
4. Lucky Mahlohonolo Litabe
5. Molahlehi Philemon Molupe
6. Xolile Zweni
7. Teboho Loate
8. Lehlohonolo Nicolus Leeto
9. Mokete Petros Lipholo
10. Diana Tsobotsi Khomoeasera

==== Gauteng ====
1. John Motlhware Mokome
2. Sipho Edward Sikhakhane
3. Anna Mantho Malatjie
4. Johannes Mokoka
5. Hleziphi Nomathemba Ndimande
6. Thabiso Philimon Mabetwa
7. Sebolaishe Rose Manyathela
8. Ian Victor
9. Sarah Amelia Soxokashe
10. Izak Ntoka
11. Mahummed Lowrence Khan
12. Tebogo Solomon Saidi
13. Andile Silvester Qoli
14. Thabo Johannes Makgamathe
15. Alice Mmathapelo Mailula
16. Selina Kananelo Matamela
17. Mudalahothe Florah Randela

==== KwaZulu-Natal ====
1. Siphiwe Sibiya

==== Limpopo ====
1. Matome Moses Maila
2. Erick Mohlapamaswi
3. Moyahabo Dina Maphoto
4. Makhasane Dina Maluleke
5. Vusi Oscar Mauda
6. Mokgadi Valentine Maila
7. Philly Aschendorf
8. Keadimilwe Alfred Lebepe
9. Sekedi Reginah Mokgolobotho
10. Silas John Ramashia

==== Mpumalanga ====
1. Hamphrey Brown Mnisi

==== North West ====
1. Oaitse Lucky Monametsi
2. Elizabeth Mamogami Modibedi
3. Mpho Theodora Kgositlou
4. Martha Thera Sevenster
5. Vuyelwa Gloria Num
6. Doris Kilibone Konda
7. Molatlhegi Samuel Molaetsi

==== Northern Cape ====
1. Koos Esau

==== Western Cape ====
1. Ntombomzi Catherine Sikhakhane
2. Francois Jacques‐Pierre Malan
3. Kholeka Christian Qampi
4. Nicholas Mlungisi Notshaya
5. Zwelithini Bleki
6. Carol Van Staden
7. Xolile Majiyezi
8. Marius Jacques Van Reenen
9. Lindiwe Mtembu
10. Molisana David Masuhlo
11. Luxolo Qampi

== Democratic Alliance ==
=== National ===
1. **John Steenhuisen**
2. **Ashor Sarupen**
3. **Dion George**
4. **S'bongiseni Vilakazi**
5. **Andrew Whitfield**
6. **Werner Horn**
7. **Jane Sithole**
8. **Leon Basson**
9. Willie Aucamp
10. **Solly Malatsi**
11. **Glynnis Breytenbach**
12. **Siviwe Gwarube**
13. **Natasha Mazzone**
14. **Cathlene Labuschagne**
15. **Mathew Cuthbert**
16. **Leon Schreiber**
17. **Dianne Kohler Barnard**
18. **Bridget Masango**
19. **Erik Marais**
20. **Angel Khanyile**
21. **Edwin Baptie**
22. **Tsholofelo Motshidi-Bodlani**
23. **Emma Powell**
24. **Baxolile Nodada**
25. **Michéle Clarke**
26. **Mimmy Gondwe**
27. **Shara Singh**
28. **Darren Bergman**
29. **Alexandra Abrahams**
30. Conrad Poole
31. **Adrian Roos**
32. **Chris Hunsinger**
33. Patrick Atkinson
34. Edwin Macrae Bath
35. **Michael Bagraim**
36. **James Lorimer**
37. **Samantha Graham**
38. George Michalakis
39. Ciska Jordaan
40. Chris Hattingh
41. Delmaine Christians
42. **Désirée Van Der Walt**
43. Mlondi Mveli Mdluli
44. Matlhodi Maseko
45. Toby Chance
46. **Kevin Mileham**
47. **Annelie Lotriet**
48. **Henro Krüger**
49. **Joe McGluwa**
50. Lisa-Maré Schickerling
51. Odysseus Motlatjo Thetjeng
52. Bradley Singh
53. Msizi Madinane
54. Riad Davids
55. Bonginkosi Madikizela
56. **Thamsanqa Mabhena**
57. **Kobus Marais**
58. **Janho Engelbrecht**
59. Ryan Smith
60. Liam Jacobs
61. Elmarie Linde
62. Tumelo Ramongalo
63. Andrew Bateman
64. **Mergan Chetty**
65. Leah Potgieter
66. Katherine Christie
67. **Haseenabanu Ismail**
68. Marius Gerhard Victor
69. Sphesihle Zondi
70. Renaldo Gouws
71. **Karabo Khakhau**
72. Damien Klopper
73. **Sello Seitlholo**
74. **Gizella Opperman**
75. Hermanus Frans Marx
76. Kingsley Wakelin
77. André Brahm Truter
78. **Luyolo Mphithi**
79. Wendy Philander
80. **Maliyakhe Shelembe**
81. **Wendy Alexander**
82. Zimkhitha Sulelo
83. Nicole Bollman
84. Anna Maria Du Plessis
85. David Ross
86. **Annerie Weber**
87. Jeanne Marguerite Adriaanse
88. Henriette du Plessis
89. Bianca Mocke
90. **Nazley Sharif**
91. Stephen Edmund Korabie
92. Shontel Veronica De Boer
93. Mlindi Nhanha
94. **Tania Halse**
95. Cyril Kabel Kouene
96. Johanna Steenkamp
97. Michael Kaars
98. Phumudzo Prince Mabirimisa
99. **Madeleine Hicklin**
100. Paul John Swart
101. Sakhile Mngadi
102. Fezeka Mbiko
103. Thabang Kennedy Rankoe
104. Teboho Abram Sekaledi
105. Gertha Jacoba Rossouw
106. Magdalena Antoinette van Wyk
107. David Edward Janse Van Vuuren
108. Kingsol Chabalala
109. Retief Odendaal
110. **Jacques Smalle**
111. Ina Cilliers
112. **Benedicta van Minnen**
113. Deidré Baartman
114. Ruhan Robinson
115. Andrew Dirk De Blocq Van Scheltinga
116. Mervyn Cirota
117. Evert du Plessis
118. Peter Johnson
119. Priscilla Isaacs
120. Leon David Van Wyk
121. **Hannah Winkler**
122. Vicky Knoetze
123. Rikus Badenhorst
124. Daylin Mitchell
125. Karl Willem du Pré le Roux
126. **Nicholas Myburgh**
127. Tim Brauteseth
128. **Jan de Villiers**
129. Gillion Bosman
130. Jade Miller
131. Crezane Bosch
132. **Eleanore Bouw-Spies**
133. Zelda Khathutshelo Rasilingwane
134. Yao-Heng Sun
135. Joseph Hendrik Pieter Britz
136. Nico de Jager
137. Werner Pretorius
138. Dulandi Leech
139. Fawzia Rhoda
140. Horatio Mario Hendricks
141. Wildri Dennis Peach
142. Mark John Burke
143. Freddy Sonakile
144. Leander Kruger
145. Martin Meyer
146. Isaac Sileku
147. Michael Waters
148. Stephen James Moore
149. Heinrich Müller
150. **Farhat Essack**
151. Kabelo Kgobisa-Ngcaba
152. Reinette Liebenberg
153. Beyers Smit
154. **Dave Bryant**
155. Alan Fuchs
156. Imran Keeka
157. Nicholas Gotsell
158. Dirk Johannes Wessels
159. Sérgio Dos Santos
160. Bronwynn Engelbrecht
161. Maria Aletta Helm
162. Sonja Boshoff
163. Christiaan Jacobus Steyl
164. Karen Jooste
165. **Phineas Masipa**
166. Mokgethi Kabelo Mogatosi
167. Riona Gokool
168. Nicole Janita Van Dyk
169. **Chantel King**
170. Marlaine Nair
171. Malcolm Figg
172. Nicola Susanna Du Plessis
173. Tiaan Kotze
174. Igor Stefan Scheurkogel
175. Christopher Glen Santana
176. Nicolaas Hendrik Pienaar
177. Emile Langenhoven
178. Belinda Cynthia Echeozonjoku
179. **Traverse Le Goff**
180. Lucia Lesego Lekoto
181. Liette Van Der Eems
182. Andrew John Stewart
183. Tania Campbell
184. Karen Smith
185. Peter Andre Verbeek
186. David Mark Campbell Mckay
187. Morné Steyn
188. Tyrell Meyers
189. Mario André Wessels
190. Mzamo Billy
191. Siphesihle Lwandile Magubane
192. Sean Lennon Stacey
193. Joshua Peter Dickinson
194. Trudie Maria Johanna Grovä Morgan
195. Andrew Stroebel
196. Sebate Golden Maduana
197. André Beetge
198. Nkosi Duncan Mthembu
199. Tersia Marshall
200. Michael Beyleveld

=== Regional ===
==== Eastern Cape ====
1. Andrew Grant Whitfield
2. Baxolile Babongile Nodada
3. Samantha Jane Graham
4. Kevin John Mileham
5. Joseph Hendrik Pieter Britz
6. Renaldo Gouws
7. Anna Maria Du Plessis
8. Mlindi Advent Nhanha
9. Fezeka Mbiko
10. Malcolm John Figg
11. Karen Smith
12. Morné Gerhard Steyn
13. Nomvano Zibonda
14. Thandeka Moloko Mbabama
15. Ondela Hlangoluhle Kepe
16. Siyamthanda Luvo Vimbani
17. Lutho Raymond Kutase
18. Eldrige Ashvon Ruiters
19. Anathi Majeke
20. Dharmesh Manilal Dhaya
21. Lenard Malesa
22. Rowene Alice Johnston
23. Siyasanga Sijadu
24. Kwanele Mpehlo

==== Free State ====
1. Werner Horn
2. George Michalakis
3. Annelie Lotriet
4. Karabo Lerato Khakhau
5. David Edward Janse Van Vuuren
6. Werner Pretorius
7. Dulandi Leech
8. Igor Stefan Scheurkogel
9. David Mark Campbell Mckay
10. David Christie Ross

==== Gauteng ====
1. Cilliers Brink
2. Bridget Staff Masango
3. Tsholofelo Katlego Bodlani
4. Michéle Odette Clarke
5. Dennis Richard Ryder
6. Mokhaugelo Solomon Chabalala
7. Agatha Wilhelmina Cilliers
8. Darren Bergman
9. Adrian Christopher Roos
10. Patrick George Atkinson
11. Andrew Dirk De Blocq Van Scheltinga
12. Mervyn Hyman Cirota
13. Evert Phillipus Du Plessis
14. Jade Miller
15. Crezane Bosch
16. Zelda Khathutshelo Rasilingwane
17. James Robert Bourne Lorimer
18. Yao‐Heng Sun
19. Nicolaas Mattheus De Jager
20. Roger William Tobias Chance
21. Wildri Dennis Peach
22. Thamsanqa Bhekokwakhe Mabhena
23. Janho Engelbrecht
24. Liam Chad Jacobs
25. Michael Waters
26. Stephen James Moore
27. Tumelo Robert Ramongalo
28. Leah Ruth Potgieter
29. Haseenabanu Ismail
30. Kingsley's Hope Wakelin
31. Alan Joseph Fuchs
32. Luyolo Mphithi
33. Wendy Robyn Alexander
34. Nazley Khan Sharif
35. Sérgio José Pombo Dos Santos
36. Bronwynn Anne Engelbrecht
37. Madeleine Bertine Hicklin
38. Nicole Janita Van Dyk
39. Nicola Susanna Du Plessis
40. Tiaan Kotze
41. Christopher Glen Santana
42. Belinda Cynthia Echeozonjoku
43. Lucia Lesego Lekoto
44. Msizi Madinane
45. Aletta Rosaline De Beer
46. Malcolm Tau Maifala
47. Nicole Jacqueline Rahn

==== KwaZulu-Natal ====
1. Dean William Macpherson
2. Hannah Shameema Winkler
3. Sbongiseni Gerald Vilakazi
4. Dianne Kohler
5. Timothy James Brauteseth
6. Edwin Victor Baptie
7. Shara Singh
8. Lukas Marthinus Meyer
9. Edwin Macrae Bath
10. Mlondi Mveli Mdluli
11. Imran Keeka
12. Mergan Chetty
13. Riona Gokool
14. Marlaine Nair
15. Sphesihle Zondi
16. Maliyakhe Lymon Shelembe
17. Nicole Jane Bollman
18. Shontel Veronica De Boer
19. Sakhile Mngadi
20. Mzamo Billy
21. Siphesihle Lwandile Magubane
22. André Beetge
23. Thys Daniël Janse Van Rensburg
24. Mmabatho Tembe
25. Caelee Jane Laing
26. Sandile Penuel Dladla
27. Bradley Singh
28. Sithembiso Ngema
29. Raganie Thomas
30. Alicia Kissoon
31. Elma Rabe
32. Leon Armin Garbade
33. Autrina Nomathemba Phungula
34. Sibongiseni Ngcobo
35. Bradwyn Leroy Marnce
36. Khethokuhle Siboniso Sibisi
37. Michael Steven Bond
38. Bongumusa Cyril Nhlabathi
39. Henning Petrus Cornelius De Wet
40. Muziwensizwa Stanley Ndlovu
41. Ashley Gavin Frank

==== Limpopo ====
1. Mmoba Solomon Malatsi
2. Désirée Van Der Walt
3. Christiaan Frederik Beyers Smit
4. Odysseus Motlatjo Thetjeng
5. Hermanus Frans Marx
6. Francois Jacques Joubert
7. Bianca Mocke
8. Phumudzo Prince Mabirimisa

==== Mpumalanga ====
1. Raesetja Jane Sithole
2. Ciska Jordaan
3. Hendrik Christiaan Crafford Krüger
4. Damien Dominic Klopper
5. Annerie Maria Magdalena Weber
6. Hildegard Sonja Boshoff
7. Teboho Abram Sekaledi
8. Cyril Kabelo Chuene
9. Kuzwakele Marcus Mdau
10. Solly Shilubane
11. Thembisile Angel Khanyile
12. Mbulelo Khonjwayo
13. Dawid Francois Du Plessis
14. Nicholaas Cornelius Van Huyssteen
15. Vincent David Mokoala

==== North West ====
1. Leonard Jones Basson
2. Christian Hattingh
3. Joseph Job Mc Gluwa
4. Isaac Sello Seitlholo
5. Jeanne Marguerite Adriaanse
6. Johannes Jacobus Le Grange
7. Cornél Dreyer
8. Johanna Steenkamp
9. Carin Visser
10. Gertha Jacoba Rossouw
11. Arista‐Louise Annandale
12. Gert Lourens Jacobus Cromhout
13. Adri‐Susan Grovä

==== Northern Cape ====
1. Delmaine Chesley Christians
2. Lisa‐Maré Schickerling
3. Michael Kaars
4. Magdalena Antoinette Van Wyk
5. Esmé Hough

==== Western Cape ====
1. Frederik Jacobus Badenhorst
2. Karl Willem Du Le Roux
3. Nicholas Georg Myburgh
4. Jan Naudé De Villiers
5. Kabelo Kgobisa‐Ngcaba
6. Farhat Essack
7. Ian Cameron
8. Eleanore Rochelle Jacquelene Spies
9. Mark John Burke
10. Michael Bagraim
11. Letta Matlhodi Maseko
12. Bonginkosi Success Madikizela
13. Sarel Jacobus Francois Marais
14. Ryan Smith
15. Elmarie Linde
16. Andrew Gordon Bateman
17. Katherine Alexandra Christie
18. Nicholas Gotsell
19. Dirk Johannes Wessels
20. Marius Gerhard Victor
21. André Brahm Truter
22. Wendy Felecia Philander
23. Noko Phineas Masipa
24. Zimkhitha Sulelo

=== Provincial ===
==== Eastern Cape ====
1. Yusuf Cassim
2. Jane Mary Cowley
3. Retief Odendaal
4. Mokgethi Kabelo Mogatosi
5. Vicky Knoetze
6. Horatio Mario Hendricks
7. Leander Kruger
8. Heinrich Müller
9. Marlene Vonita Ewers
10. Chantel King
11. Malcolm Figg
12. Susan Elizabeth Bentley
13. Marshall von Buchenroder
14. Karen Smith
15. Morné Steyn
16. Rano Conrad Kayser
17. John Cupido
18. Nomvano Zibonda
19. Thandeka Mbabama
20. Ondela Hlangoluhle Kepe
21. Jacobus Petrus Johannes Botha
22. Siyamthanda Luvo Vimbani
23. Eldrige Ashvon Ruiters
24. Anathi Majeke
25. Dharmesh Manilal Dhaya
26. Lenard Malesa
27. Rowene Alice Johnston
28. Wonga Bongekile Potwana
29. Marion Mackley
30. Fezeka Mbiko
31. Luvuyo Rodney Sizani
32. Gcinilizwe Salaze
33. Kwanele Mpehlo
34. Bredine Share
35. Norman Joshua Silke
36. Estelle Dell
37. Coenraad André Swart
38. Rajeshree Burger
39. Mishkah Leppan
40. Vianca Swart
41. Jo-Gene Strauss
42. Lee-Ann Ntombenhle Sheltox
43. Nomonde Veronica Mazantsi
44. Dominic Christo Prince
45. Lauralee Alyssa Jacobs
46. Saliem Johnson
47. Christie-Lee Olivier
48. Bonga Xhangayi
49. Nathan Martin
50. Noxolo Bebeza
51. Natania Illonka Viljoen
52. Nicolas Rudolph Swarts
53. Fidelia Cyndelene Malatoe
54. Casey Mary-Claire Frazer
55. Sesam Miza
56. Ndileka Ngqawana
57. Nolwazimarry-Ann Cofa
58. Caydon Luke Roach
59. Ashleigh Arlene De Lange
60. Busisiwe Princess Mki
61. Annette Rademeyer
62. Christa Mostert
63. Fahmeeda Jaffar
64. Kyla-Lee Cronjé
65. Chantel Ferreira
66. Sakhekile Tukani
67. Asanda Tsewu
68. Patricia Neliswa Dyani

==== Free State ====
1. Roy Jankielsohn
2. Werner Horn
3. George Michalakis
4. Annelie Lotriet
5. David Edward Janse Van Vuuren
6. Werner Pretorius
7. Dulandi Leech
8. Thapelo David Masoeu
9. Igor Stefan Scheurkogel
10. David Mark Campbell Mckay
11. Leona Mary Kleynhans
12. Moferefere Jafta Mokoena
13. David Ross
14. Karabo Khakhau
15. Jan-Hendrik Cronje
16. Catharina Serfontein
17. Mariette Pittaway
18. Tania Halse
19. Thabang Kennedy Rankoe
20. Abigail Schoeman
21. Nokudekwalapha Mbalientle Mnaba
22. Eric Teboho Motloung
23. Christopher Mark Dalton
24. Beatrice Aletta Susanna Campbell-Cloete
25. Mahalia Josephine Kose
26. Anthony Jonathan Hendricks

==== Gauteng ====
1. Solly Msimanga
2. Ashor Sarupen
3. Cilliers Brink
4. Michael Moriarty
5. Fred Nel
6. Mathew Cuthbert
7. Jack Bloom
8. Michéle Clarke
9. Dennis Ryder
10. Kingsol Chabalala
11. Ina Cilliers
12. Darren Bergman
13. Adrian Roos
14. Patrick Atkinson
15. Ruhan Robinson
16. Andrew Dirk De Blocq Van Scheltinga
17. Mervyn Cirota
18. Evert du Plessis
19. Refiloe Nt'sekhe
20. Jade Miller
21. Crezane Bosch
22. Zelda Khathutshelo Rasilingwane
23. James Lorimer
24. Yao-Heng Sun
25. Nico de Jager
26. Roger William Tobias Chance
27. Wildri Dennis Peach
28. Bridget Masango
29. Tsholofelo Motshidi-Bodlani
30. Thamsanqa Mabhena
31. Janho Engelbrecht
32. Michael Waters
33. Stephen Moore
34. Tumelo Robert Ramongalo
35. Leah Ruth Potgieter
36. Leanne Jennifer De Jager
37. Haseenabanu Ismail
38. Kingsley's Hope Wakelin
39. Alan Fuchs
40. Luyolo Mphithi
41. Wendy Alexander
42. Nazley Khan Sharif
43. Sérgio José Pombo Dos Santos
44. Bronwynn Anne Engelbrecht
45. Madeleine Bertine Hicklin
46. Nicole Janita Van Dyk
47. Ofentse Nathaniel Madzebatela
48. Sebate Golden Maduana
49. Pogiso Glen Mthimunye
50. Nicola Susanna Du Plessis
51. Tiaan Kotze
52. Christopher Glen Santana
53. Belinda Cynthia Echeozonjoku
54. Lucia Lesego Lekoto
55. Andrew John Stewart
56. Tania Lynette Campbell
57. Peter Andre Verbeek
58. Alex Christians
59. Tyrell Meyers
60. Nkosi Duncan Mthembu
61. Malcolm Tau Maifala
62. Nicole Jacqueline Rahn
63. Michael Devon Da Silva
64. Ntombi Valencia Khumalo
65. Lori Cynthia Coogan
66. Brandon Pretorius
67. Mokete Ishmael Motsamai
68. Simon James Lapping
69. Ingrid Marianne Reinten
70. Bongani Nkomo
71. Gerhard Jacobus Niemand
72. Nigoba Gail Mphafudi
73. Arron Cecil Steyn
74. Solomon Masehlele Maila
75. David Terence Foley
76. Phillip Manuel Gomes
77. Lorna Beharie
78. Motheo Mtimkulu
79. Andrew Fergus Marais
80. Marais Jansen

==== KwaZulu-Natal ====
1. Christopher John Pappas
2. Francoise Adrianus Rodgers
3. Dean William Macpherson
4. Mmabatho Tembe
5. Hannah Shameema Winkler
6. Sbongiseni Gerald Vilakazi
7. Timothy James Brauteseth
8. Edwin Victor Baptie
9. Shara Singh
10. Lukas Marthinus Meyer
11. Edwin Macrae Bath
12. Mlondi Mveli Mdluli
13. Imran Keeka
14. Riona Gokool
15. Marlaine Nair
16. Sphesihle Zondi
17. Nicole Jane Bollman
18. Shontel Veronica De Boer
19. Sakhile Mngadi
20. Tamsyn Colley
21. Mzamo Billy
22. Siphesihle Lwandile Magubane
23. Sithembiso Ngema
24. André Beetge
25. Thys Dani°L Janse Van Rensburg
26. Caelee Jane Laing
27. Zoë Adele Solomon
28. Sandile Penuel Dladla
29. Bradley Singh
30. Raganie Thomas
31. Alicia Kissoon
32. Elma Rabe
33. Leon Armin Garbade
34. Autrina Nomathemba Phungula
35. Natasha Nicole Crawford
36. Sibongiseni Ngcobo
37. Bradwyn Leroy Marnce
38. Khethokuhle Siboniso Sibisi
39. Maliyakhe Lymon Shelembe
40. Perfect Bheka Ntuli
41. Remona Letisha Mckenzie
42. Michael Steven Bond
43. Henning Petrus Cornelius De Wet
44. Ashley Gavin Frank
45. Mandlenkosi Sicelo Mabika
46. Rajendhra Prasadh Maharaj
47. Muziwensizwa Stanley Ndlovu
48. Bongumusa Cyril Nhlabathi

==== Limpopo ====
1. Evelyn Rayne Wilson
2. Jacobus Frederik Smalle
3. Maria Aletta Helm
4. Nicolaas Hendrik Pienaar
5. Tiny Doraine Ramathabatha Chidi
6. Hermanus Frans Marx
7. Patrick
8. Khatija
9. Jayson
10. Manormoney
11. Regina
12. Zilindile Marshall
13. Nokuthula
14. Simthembile
15. Zikhona Nwabisa
16. Litha Law
17. Bulelwa Beauty
18. Petrus Sibongile
19. Bukeka
20. Athenkosi
21. Cynthia Nonzaliseko
22. Mkhululi Leonard
23. Yoliswa Nomampondomise
24. Godfrey
25. Sherille Susan
26. Mlamli Alfred
27. Portia Zoleka
28. Mziyanda
29. Nolonwabo
30. Mzukisi Auloshiba
31. Phiwaba
32. Luvuyo Wiseman
33. Asanda
34. Nkosiyoxolo
35. Bongiwe
36. Sibuyekezo Buntu
37. Lona
38. Siphelele
39. Mbalentle
40. Elvis Lakirence
41. Gcobisa Eudora
42. Lindani
43. Ayanda
44. Mzwandile Wiseman
45. Siphokazi Lovegirl
46. Thabo
47. Onga
48. Yazini
49. Yolanda
50. Bandile
51. Nosimpiwe Faith
1. Francois Jacques Joubert
2. Tumedi Mathokoni Mahlo
3. Risham Maharaj
4. Katlego Suzan Phala

==== Mpumalanga ====
1. Bosman Grobler
2. Suhla James Masango
3. Trudie Maria Johanna Grovä Morgan
4. Damien Dominic Klopper
5. Annerie Maria Magdalena Weber
6. Hildegard Sonja Boshoff
7. Teboho Abram Sekaledi
8. Tersia Marshall
9. Cyril Kabelo Chuene
10. Joseph Mthelekwa Sibanyoni
11. Kuzwakele Marcus Mdau
12. Solly Shilubane
13. Robert Frank Dlamini
14. Sanley Van Der Merwe
15. Dawid Francois Du Plessis
16. Rantobeng Billy Tseke
17. Frederik Hendrik Coetzee
18. Nicholaas Cornelius Van Huyssteen
19. Vincent David Mokoala
20. Aaron Bhekuyise Khumalo
21. Raesetja Jane Sithole
22. Ciska Jordaan
23. Hendrik Christiaan Crafford Krüger
24. Thembisile Angel Khanyile

==== North-West ====
1. Bafana Freddy Sonakile
2. Christiaan Jacobus Steyl
3. Hendri°Tte Van Huyssteen
4. Isaac Sello Seitlholo
5. Jeanne Marguerite Adriaanse
6. Johanna Steenkamp
7. Wolfgang Wallhorn
8. Johannes Jacobus Le Grange
9. Cornél Dreyer
10. Carin Visser
11. Gertha Jacoba Rossouw
12. Jacqueline Rachelle Theologo
13. Gavin George Edwards
14. Stephens Abram Kutumela
15. Nelio Nhacuangue
16. Gideon Johannes Van Zyl
17. Hendrina Margaretha Strydom
18. Nkateko Stephina Mabunda
19. Arista-Louise Annandale
20. Neo Bernett Mabote
21. Koketso Dulcie Gaebee
22. Mponeng Winston Rabotapi
23. Sefofu Jonas Modisa
24. Francis Kasonkomona

==== Northern Cape ====
1. Isak Cornelius Christiaan Fritz
2. Harold Mc Gluwa
3. Priscilla Serina Johanna Isaacs
4. Fawzia Rhoda
5. Reinette Liebenberg
6. Karen Jooste
7. Gizella Opperman
8. Henri°Tte Du Plessis
9. Michael Kaars
10. Magdalena Antoinette Van Wyk
11. Rudolph Bertus Floors Saal
12. Willie Erasmus
13. Philippus Theodorus Van Der Steen
14. Elizabeth Niemann
15. Adam Jacobus Edward Claassen
16. Kgomotso Charity Mohapanele
17. Leopold Heinrich Sarel Pieterse

==== Western Cape ====
1. Alan Winde
2. Tertuis Simmers
3. Anton Bredell
4. Thomas Waters
5. Deidré Baartman
6. Jaco Londt
7. David Maynier
8. Ivan Meyer
9. Anroux Marais
10. Nomafrench Mbombo
11. Ricardo Mackenzie
12. Mireille Wenger
13. Benedicta van Minnen
14. Peter Johnson
15. Leon David Van Wyk
16. Daylin Mitchell
17. Gillion Bosman
18. Reagen Allen
19. Isaac Sileku
20. David William Bryant
21. Phineas Masipa
22. Wendy Philander
23. Memory Booysen
24. Nicholas Gotsell
25. Dirk Johannes Wessels
26. Marius Gerhard Victor
27. André Brahm Truter
28. Zimkhitha Sulelo
29. Paul John Swart
30. Emile Langenhoven
31. Traverse Le Goff
32. Mario André Wessels
33. Sean Lennon Stacey
34. Andrew Stroebel
35. Stuart Bruce Pringle
36. Inge-Lisa Rohlwink
37. John-Martin Goetsch
38. Cayla Ann Tomšs Murray
39. Ndipiwe Olayi
40. Helen Coetzee

== Economic Freedom Fighters ==
=== National ===
1. **Julius Sello Malema**
2. **Veronica Mente**
3. **Floyd Shivambu**
4. **Omphile Maotwe**
5. **Marshall Dlamini**
6. **Poppy Mailola**
7. **Godrich Gardee**
8. **Hlengiwe Mkhaliphi**
9. **Mbuyiseni Ndlozi**
10. **Leigh-Ann Mathys**
11. Dali Mpofu
12. **Nontando Nolutshungu**
13. **Yazini Tetyana**
14. Mbali Dlamini
15. **Vuyani Pambo**
16. Mmabatho Mokause
17. **Sinawo Thambo**
18. **Mathibe Mohlala**
19. Sihle Lonzi
20. **Reneiloe Mashabela**
21. **Ringo Madlingozi**
22. **Makoti Sibongile Khawula**
23. **Nthako Matiase**
24. **Paulnita Marais**
25. **Mandla Shikwambana**
26. **Laetitia Arries**
27. Carl Niehaus
28. **Mandisa Makesini**
29. **Mgcini Tshwaku**
30. **Ntokozo Hlonyana**
31. **Khanya Ceza**
32. **Babalwa Mathulelwa**
33. Fikile Daniel Oortman
34. **Sharon Letlape**
35. Fana Mokoena
36. **Sophie Thembekwayo**
37. **Nazier Paulsen**
38. **Constance Mkhonto**
39. **Anthony Matumba**
40. **Busisiwe Mkhwebane**
41. **Mzwanele Manyi**
42. **Mathapelo Siwisa**
43. **Virgill Gericke**
44. **Nqobile Mhlongo**
45. Siyabonga Gida
46. Lilian Managa
47. Magasela Mzobe
48. Phindiwe Kaba
49. Wandile Kasibe
50. **Florence Tito**
51. Mazwikayise Brian Blose
52. **Natasha Ntlangwini**
53. Thapelo Predict Mogale
54. Luvuyo Tafeni
55. Litha Law Zibula
56. Gcobisa Patricia Maneli
57. Mubarak Basha Mahaboob
58. Thembi Msane
59. Victor Rambau
60. **Nosipho Makamba-Botya**
61. **Isaac Mafanya**
62. Sixolisa Gcilishe
63. Andrew Arnolds
64. Nande Dyantyi
65. **Eugene Mthethwa**
66. **Yoliswa Yako**
67. Mkhululi Leonard Dlevu
68. Yolanda Luzipo
69. Mlamli Makhetha
70. Tebogo Mokwele
71. Mcebisi Jobela
72. Khethiwe Mildred Muthwa
73. Elvis Lakirence Miggels
74. Nokuthula Mlokoti
75. Emmanuel Wilson Chauke
76. Betty Kedisaletse Diale
77. Abednego Vukosi Chomela
78. Marria Swazi Dlamini
79. Mziyanda Hlekiso
80. Nomtombi Eunice Kama
81. Dunisani Lyborn Baloyi
82. Mbalentle Zwane
83. Mzikayise Gwetyana
84. Primrose Nnana Bogatsu
85. Vukani Ndlovu
86. Thuleka Khutala Breakfast
87. Bulelani Dyantyi
88. Lerticia Merlisa Pandohe
89. Xhanti Kani
90. Aishah Cassiem
91. Sphamandla Sandile Biyela
92. Siphosethu Booi
93. Lindani Mdlokolo
94. Gcobisa Eudora Bomela
95. Chumani Matiwane
96. Modiegi Rosey Dikolomela
97. Godfrey Ganya
98. Primrose Noziphiwo Bushula
99. Mgidi Isaac Khithika
100. Indiphile Mqoqi
101. **Mothusi Montwedi**
102. Odlé Nikita Goodall
103. Peter Keetse
104. Rita Dladla
105. Tholinhlahla Fortune Msweli
106. Millicent Bopape
107. Dumisani Baleni
108. Mokgadi Idah Chula
109. Mpilo Manzini
110. Charmaine Jabulile Mngomezulu
111. Nkosiyoxolo Mncam
112. Busisiwe Maria Shiburi
113. Sihle Sylvester Mathibela
114. Velaphi Malatji
115. Liza Asavela Mfana
116. Nkateko Danisile Ndlovu
117. Phumula Erickson Thabede
118. Zanele Masemola
119. Mbulelo Innocent Dumani
120. Inam Kula
121. Godwin Kaekae Ratikwane
122. Boipelo Priscilla Kgwadi
123. Mphumzi Fodo
124. Maggie Thandi Mhlanga
125. Mfundo Percy Hlophe
126. Modiehi Jacinta Chere
127. Matshidiso Botswe
128. Mogaleadi Kgothatso Mogoane
129. Malose Nicodimus Mojela
130. Mbali Zondo
131. Malekutu Karel Sekhukhune
132. Makhosi Xoliswa Buthelezi
133. Tokollo Thethe
134. Boitumelo Makhene
135. Shikoda Mkhwanazi
136. Vinolia Lesego Janki
137. Senzo Tressure Mhlanga
138. Phikiswa Dyonase
139. Mhlaliseni Lazarus Yende
140. Mikateko Phyllis Ngomani
141. Akhona Dyantyi
142. Siphiwe Jeanette Mashele
143. Calvin Ofentse Moema
144. Thembani Lucia Hlabangwani
145. Surprise Harold Kubayi
146. Arbiba Gugulethu Phiri
147. Axola Toto
148. Vuyolwethu Samantha Nqayi
149. Zenzo Clifford Hlazo
150. Paballo Portia Poone-Rankholo
151. Mpho Tsilo
152. Belesia Maletsatsi Hleza
153. Morwamphela Patsi Phala
154. Zamile Patience Vilakazi
155. Orediretse Masebe
156. Nompumelelo Machabe
157. Karabo Gaoganediwe
158. Paballo Sweetness Msomi
159. Sipho Penga
160. Jessica Seipati Bogosi
161. Tlou Reus Manamela
162. Lusanda Hilda Mfuku
163. Wandile Percy Repinga
164. Babalwa Mini-Qwazi
165. Duncan Tshepang Moreotsenye
166. Mohanuoa Letia Masobe
167. Lucky Baloyi
168. Naledi Raletsemo
169. Phenyo Joseph Ohentswe
170. Precious Khethiwe Singwane
171. Madimetja Lorence Matsetela
172. Gail Ethel Sibiya
173. Neil Glen Louw
174. Ntombikayise Ellen Mohoadibe
175. Thapelo Daniel Mogotsi
176. Keobatlile Gladiolus Mabuela
177. Komaseroto Benjamin Disoloane
178. Patricia Nontuthuzelo Booi
179. Jacob Diao Lekhori
180. Theresa Mathye
181. Mzubanzi Dambuza
182. Sindile Temaphanga Lukhele
183. Bekisisa Khulekami Buthelezi
184. Mary Meme Bontsi
185. Thato Mathabela Mokete
186. Tintswalo Nomhle Baloyi
187. Comfort Frans Ngwasheng
188. Babongile Bomela
189. Louis Gardiner
190. Slindile Happy Gutshwa
191. Mila Aphelele Zibi
192. Ntombethemba Princess Faltein
193. Daniel Mekgwe
194. Sharon Gongota
195. Thabane Miya
196. Precious Marie Leeuw
197. Alfred Norman Motsi
198. Abigail Mogofe
199. Sibonelo Ngidi
200. **Naledi Nokukhanya Chirwa**

=== Regional ===
==== Eastern Cape ====
1. Yazini Tetyana
2. Babalwa Mathulelwa
3. Sinawo Thambo
4. Phindiwe Kaba
5. Siyabonga Gida
6. Noluvuyo Tafeni
7. Litha Law Zibula
8. Gcobisa Patricia Maneli
9. Mkhululi Leonard Dlevu
10. Yoliswa Nomampondomise Yako
11. Mlamli Alfred Makhetha
12. Yolanda Luzipo
13. Mcebisi Jobela
14. Nokuthula Mlokoti
15. Elvis Lakirence Miggels
16. Thuleka Khutala Breakfast
17. Mziyanda Hlekiso
18. Gcobisa Eudora Bomela
19. Mzikayise Gwetyana
20. Indiphile Mqoqi
21. Bulelani Dyantyi
22. Vuyolwethu Samantha Nqayi
23. Xhanti Kani
24. Babalwa Mini‐Qwazi
25. Ntombethemba Princess Faltein

==== Free State ====
1. Nthako Sam Matiase
2. Paulnita Marais
3. Lehlohonolo Goodwill Mokoena
4. Mandisa Makesini
5. Mbulelo Innocent Dumani
6. Paballo Portia Poone‐Rankholo
7. Shikoda Mkhwanazi
8. Mohanuoa Letia Masobe
9. Akhona Dyantyi
10. Sharon Gongota

==== Gauteng ====
1. Nyiko Floyd Shivambu
2. Omphile Mankoba Confidence Maotwe
3. Mbuyiseni Quintin Ndlozi
4. Leigh‐Ann Mathys
5. Daluxolo Christopher Mpofu
6. Khonziwe Ntokozo Fortunate Hlonyana
7. Vuyani Pambo
8. Sophie Suzan Thembekwayo
9. Carl Gerhardus Niehaus
10. Nqobile Matilda Mhlongo
11. Brian Sindile Madlingozi
12. Sixolisa Gcilishe
13. Mzwanele Manyi
14. Odlé Nikita Goodall
15. Mgcini Tshwaku
16. Rita Dladla
17. Thapelo Predict Mogale
18. Modiehi Jacinta Chere
19. Mubarak Basha Mahaboob
20. Boitumelo Makhene
21. Washington Tseko Isaac Mafanya
22. Phikiswa Dyonase
23. Eugene Mthethwa
24. Belesia Maletsatsi Hleza
25. Mgidi Isaac Khithika
26. Naledi Raletsemo
27. Dumisani Baleni
28. Keobatlile Gladiolus Mabuela
29. Godwin Kaekae Ratikwane
30. Precious Marie Leeuw
31. Tokollo Thethe
32. Rebecca Getrude Mmamokgolo Monchusi
33. Mpho Tsilo
34. Malefa Emily Sehanka
35. Orediretse Masebe
36. Nombuso Degracia Njokwe
37. Komaseroto Benjamin Disoloane
38. Seepei Rosina Ramontja
39. Bekisisa Khulekami Buthelezi
40. Florence Malehlohonolo Makhele
41. Hlongolwana Hendswell Baloyi
42. Nozintombi Selina Nyenzane
43. Philip Makwala
44. Carol Bibi Mnisi
45. Bafana Gift Moleko
46. Desire Mmatholo Mathebe
47. Naledi Nokukhanya Chirwa

==== KwaZulu-Natal ====
1. Marshall Mzingisi Dlamini
2. Hlengiwe Octavia Mkhaliphi
3. Mathibe Rebecca Mohlala
4. Mazwikayise Brian Blose
5. Makoti Sibongile Khawula
6. Magasela Mzobe
7. Thembi Portia Msane
8. Vukani Ndlovu
9. Khethiwe Mildred Muthwa
10. Sphamandla Sandile Biyela
11. Mbalentle Zwane
12. Tholinhlahla Fortune Msweli
13. Lerticia Merlisa Pandohe
14. Thabane Miya
15. Mbali Zondo
16. Lindokuhle Bongumusa Zwane
17. Makhosi Xoliswa Buthelezi
18. Mthunzi Heavy‐Man Simelane
19. Zamile Patience Vilakazi
20. Sibusiso Sizani
21. Slindile Happy Gutshwa
22. Ncedo Aubrey Njenga
23. Lucy Thobekile Dube
24. Thamisanqa Xuma
25. Nomvomvo Letticia Khumalo
26. Linda Godfrey Seja
27. Sihlengiwe Pamela Gebashe
28. Lungelo Nxele
29. Eugena Hlengiwe Khanye
30. Mondli Shabalala
31. Nomalanga Promise Tshabalala
32. Mbongeni Trevor Mnikwa
33. Nonhlanhla Ethel Mbatha
34. Sibusiso Blessing Mthiyane
35. Siphesihle Nzuza
36. Sabelo David Khubisa
37. Nokuthula Glenda Ntantiso
38. Thembelihle Thobani Ntuli
39. Busisiwe Rejoice Zulu
40. Siphamandla Mantengu
41. Nelisiwe Patricia Mthabela

==== Limpopo ====
1. Julius Sello Malema
2. Ngwanamakwetle Reneiloe Mashabela
3. Mandla Shikwambana
4. Lilian Managa
5. Anthony Matumba
6. Millicent Bopape
7. Lencel Mashidika Komane
8. Mokgadi Idah Chula
9. Phuti Peter Keetse
10. Zanele Masemola
11. Victor Rambau
12. Mogaleadi Kgothatso Mogoane
13. Abednego Vukosi Chomela
14. Mikateko Phyllis Ngomani
15. Malose Nicodimus Mojela
16. Thembani Lucia Hlabangwani
17. Malekutu Karel Sekhukhune
18. Tintswalo Nomhle Baloyi
19. Walter Samuel Molapo
20. Theresa Mathye

==== Mpumalanga ====
1. Poppy Raisibe Mailola
2. Godrich Ahmed Gardee
3. Busisiwe Joyce Mkhwebane
4. Khanya Ceza
5. Mbali Dlamini
6. Emmanuel Wilson Chauke
7. Constance Nonhlanhla Mkhonto
8. Mpilo Manzini
9. Marria Swazi Dlamini
10. Sihle Sylvester Mathibela
11. Charmaine Jabulile Mngomezulu
12. Phumula Erickson Thabede
13. Busisiwe Maria Shiburi
14. Mfundo Percy Hlophe
15. Velaphi Malatji

==== North West ====
1. Molebogeng Sharon Letlape
2. Fikile Daniel Oortman
3. Tebogo Josephine Mokwele
4. Mothusi Kenneth Montwedi
5. Betty Kedisaletse Diale
6. Matshidiso Mathews Botswe
7. Primrose Nnana Bogatsu
8. Calvin Ofentse Moema
9. Modiegi Rosey Dikolomela
10. Zenzo Clifford Hlazo
11. Boipelo Priscilla Kgwadi
12. Karabo Gaoganediwe
13. Paballo Sweetness Msomi

==== Northern Cape ====
1. Mmabatho Olive Mokause
2. Lorato Florence Tito
3. Annacleta Mathapelo Siwisa
4. Duncan Tshepang Moreotsenye
5. Phenyo Joseph Ohentswe

==== Western Cape ====
1. Ntombovuyo Veronica Nkuna
2. Sihle Lonzi
3. Nontando Judith Nolutshungu
4. Virgill Gericke
5. Laetitia Heloise Arries
6. Mogamad Nazier Paulsen
7. Elsabe Natasha Ntlangwini
8. Goozen Wandile Kasibe
9. Nosipho Makamba‐Botya
10. Andrew Arnolds
11. Nande Dyantyi
12. Mphumzi Fodo
13. Nomtombi Eunice Kama
14. Neil Glen Louw
15. Aishah Cassiem
16. Jacob Diao Lekhori
17. Siphosethu Booi
18. Mzubanzi Dambuza
19. Inam Kula
20. Louis Gardiner
21. Patricia Nontuthuzelo Booi
22. Mila Aphelele Zibi
23. Lusanda Hilda Mfuku
24. Uviwe Ndikolo

=== Provincial ===
==== Eastern Cape ====
1. Zilindile Marshall Vena
2. Nokuthula Mlokoti
3. Simthembile Madikizela
4. Zikhona Nwabisa Njoli
5. Litha Law Zibula
6. Bulelwa Beauty Dial
7. Petrus Sibongile Aloni
8. Bukeka Bodoza
9. Athenkosi Kweza
10. Cynthia Nonzaliseko Ntshiza
11. Mkhululi Leonard Dlevu
12. Yoliswa Nomampondomise Yako
13. Godfrey Ganya
14. Sherille Susan Hlati
15. Mlamli Alfred Makhetha
16. Portia Zoleka Qotoyi
17. Mziyanda Hlekiso
18. Nolonwabo Ngendane
19. Mzukisi Auloshiba Fukula
20. Phiwaba Madokwe
21. Luvuyo Wiseman Nkilishane
22. Asanda Matshobeni
23. Nkosiyoxolo Mncam
24. Bongiwe Mandoyi
25. Sibuyekezo Buntu Mzileni
26. Lona Tshotsho-Mpini
27. Siphelele Jubase
28. Mbalentle Zwane
29. Elvis Lakirence Miggels
30. Gcobisa Eudora Bomela
31. Lindani Mdlokolo
32. Ayanda Mgquba
33. Mzwandile Wiseman Mgweba
34. Siphokazi Lovegirl Ncana
35. Thabo Nondzutha
36. Onga Mpepo
37. Yazini Tetyana
38. Yolanda Luzipo
39. Bandile Kave
40. Nosimpiwe Faith Ngqola
41. Xhanti Kani
42. Phindiwe Kaba
43. Zukisa Sigcu
44. Ntomboxolo Jessica Mtyhopo
45. Setlabotsha Gratitude Moroahae
46. Nolutsha Mlamla
47. Bulelani Dyantyi
48. Babalwa Mini-Qwazi
49. Vuyani Sidinile
50. Funeka Faith Nyaniso
51. Xolani Vellem
52. Zoliswa Rejoice Edwana
53. Siphiwo Mavuso
54. Blossom Nonkosinathi Mtayisi
55. Ayanda Frans
56. Ziyanda Phakama Mnqokoyi
57. Leonard Tumo Mothapa
58. Nomalungisa Monica Koba
59. Hector Mziyanda Peter
60. Siyamthanda Dyantyie
61. Msokoli Christopher Matiso
62. Ntombethemba Princess Faltein
63. Lonwabo Maqoqo
64. Agrineth Nokulunga Dlakavu
65. Sanele Nqeketo
66. Nobuhle Duntsula
67. Chumani Matiwane
68. Akhona Zizo Govane
69. Mcebisi Jobela
70. Ayanda Mbebe
71. Mzwandile Jackson Qotoyi
72. Andisiwe Ngonyama

==== Free State ====
1. Mapheule Isaiah Liphoko
2. Lirampele Jemina Nanyane
3. Malefane Johannes Msimanga
4. Maliba Amelia Tshabalala
5. Mzelankata Thomas Macingwane
6. Mapaseka Angel Motaung
7. Tibisi April Motaung
8. Naledi Maria Mkendani
9. Jankie Elisha Sebolao
10. Selloane Mavis Motjeane
11. Ishmael Mahlomola Majake
12. Nkupi Josphina Mbangata
13. Lebohang Gilbert Mokoakoe
14. Paballo Portia Poone-Rankholo
15. Kgotso Kenneth Charlie
16. Nkahiseng Reginah Shale
17. Mbulelo Innocent Dumani
18. Lineho Sylvia Moloi
19. Rasake Darlington Ntauli
20. Mamothibe Lilian Mogwerane
21. Thabang Jeffrey Namusi
22. Mandisa Makesini
23. Butinyane Joseph Lobi
24. Fatima Zahra Makhanda
25. Moletsane Simon Moletsane
26. Thato Mokatsane
27. Moabi Lomet Mokoko
28. Mmatseko Merriam Mokhuoa
29. Johannes Mohau Sekhele
30. Mpotseng Shirley Mkhwanazi

==== Gauteng ====
1. Nkululeko Dunga
2. Tshepo Seteka
3. Moses Segatike Koma
4. Lindiwe Masilela
5. Philip Makwala
6. Moleboheng Abigail Masoleng
7. Mosimanegape John Koboekae
8. Mpho Lefatola
9. Frans Kamogelo Ngobeni
10. Boitumelo Makhene
11. Gabriel Seshobela Mothapo
12. Jeannette Matshidiso Maloka
13. Tebogo Moloi
14. Sarah Maluleke
15. Mampuru Makuduele Mampuru
16. Matsie Catherine Zikalala
17. Dumisani Baleni
18. Pinky Mashamaite
19. Rector Mkansi
20. Valerie Malefa Mothatinyana
21. Mgidi Isaac Khithika
22. Junior Noko Kedibone Mohlwana
23. Victor Thapelo Senyatso
24. Julia Chuene Mugwili
25. Mubarak Basha Mahaboob
26. Dumla Damela Nwabisa Mdlankomo
27. Joshua Sechaba Sono
28. Remonde Laura Abrahams
29. Tsogoane Kenneth Mashianoke
30. Habiba Gamal
31. Awelani Hamilton Nedoli
32. Odlé Nikita Goodall
33. Tshilidzi Tuwani
34. Londanani Olga Ratshibvumo
35. Celeste Bhagat
36. Nokuthula Khonkhobe
37. Kgotso Kale
38. Mavis Mphuthi
39. Lucky Kenneth Rakgalakane
40. Ennie Ramadimetja Makhafola
41. Khabo Eugene Shezi
42. Florence Malehlohonolo Makhele
43. Orediretse Masebe
44. Mmanoke Hilda Kula
45. Bafana Gift Moleko
46. Mamathole Margaret Motlhwa
47. Lesiba Phillemon Mothapo
48. Mantshadi Paulina Teleko
49. Itumeleng Reuben Ramokgonami
50. Blossom Allewees Sullaphen
51. Khomotso Frans Matemotja
52. Agnes Raesetja Ramalepe
53. Thobela Tony Monyembane
54. Nombuso Degracia Njokwe
55. Tshepiso Jantjie Tselampe
56. Wonderful Segolodi
57. Michael Fannah Motaung
58. Malehwiti Margaret Moyana
59. Hulisani Bethuel Munyai
60. Johanna Nkwana
61. Victor Jabulani Mathabathe
62. Nthabiseng Doreen Maatlane
63. Gershom Miluveri Hlungwani
64. Noliqwa Clementinah Semahla
65. Ephraim Tshepho Mafora
66. Makgotso Thuli Phelepe
67. Mmakaleng Themba Theledi
68. Antionette Shikoane
69. Sydney Ngoako Seanego
70. Desire Mmatholo Mathebe
71. Matimba Ngobeni
72. Leshutle Maupi
73. Malesela Johannes Thubakgale
74. Portia Molobane Seleka
75. Godwin Kaekae Ratikwane
76. Catherine Mosea
77. Audrey Kola Nkoana
78. Carol Bibi Mnisi
79. Letlhohonolo Clinton Nkuna
80. Lepulana Innocentia Masenya

==== KwaZulu-Natal ====
1. Mongezi Wellbeloved Twala
2. Thobisile Nkosi
3. Nkululeko Nkonzo Ngubane
4. Hlengiwe Portia Mvubu
5. Chuma Mandilake Wakeni
6. Precious Pearl Harricks
7. Mazwikayise Brian Blose
8. Khethiwe Mildred Muthwa
9. Thamisanqa Xuma
10. Gugu Flora Mtshali
11. Ncedo Aubrey Njenga
12. Ncamsile Prudence Khawula
13. Lwazilwakhe Nkosi
14. Dudu Mirriam James
15. Sphamandla Sandile Biyela
16. Nomvuyelelo Dlamini
17. Vincent Thandumuzi Nsele
18. Naomi Motilal
19. Vukani Ndlovu
20. Sanele Yvonne Nyoka
21. Zibonele Zephania Duma
22. Nonhlanhla Fortunate Makhanya
23. Sifiso Eric Madondo
24. Lucy Thobekile Dube
25. Thulani Derrick Ndlovu
26. Silindokuhle Portia Mngomezulu
27. Christopher Nsikayezwe Gumede
28. Slindile Happy Gutshwa
29. Siyabonga Christopher Mdletshe
30. Nomzamo Dorah Ndovela
31. Lindokuhle Bongumusa Zwane
32. Cebisile Bridget Shangase
33. Zwelethu Freedom Mbambo
34. Busisiwe Rejoice Zulu
35. Sibusiso Sizani
36. Nomalanga Promise Tshabalala
37. Magasela Mzobe
38. Nomvomvo Letticia Khumalo
39. Thubelihle Mbanjwa
40. Eugena Hlengiwe Khanye
41. S'thakaselwe Zondi
42. Mbali Zondo
43. Khombezakhe Simon Madlala
44. Nobuhle Juanah Ntshangase
45. Siphephelo Zondi
46. Siphesihle Nzuza
47. Zukisani Tshangase
48. Nokubonga Princess Biyase
49. Sibusiso Blessing Mthiyane
50. Banele Brunette Thusi
51. Xolisa Mluleki Memela
52. Ntombifuthi Abegail Mkhize
53. Sithabiso Cebekhulu
54. Maureen Silindile Sangweni
55. Xolani Nkasa
56. Cynthia Precious Dumakude
57. Phakamani Wellington Zibusele Khumalo
58. Thabile Sbongile Khuzwayo
59. Tapentine Mapule Masondo
60. Nokuthula Glenda Ntantiso
61. Anderson Sakhile Mvundla
62. Hlengiwe Grace Maphumulo
63. S'thembiso Cyril Sikhosana
64. Nokuthula Gugu Mlambo
65. Lucky Steven Majola
66. Xolisile Innocentia Sifundo Hlatshwayo
67. Mthunzi Heavy-Man Simelane
68. Nikiwe Cynthia Mtshali
69. Khetha Makhanya
70. Siyathokoza Pamella Neliswa Mazibuko
71. Malibongwe Frederick Mdletshe
72. Siphesihle Minenhle Ngobese
73. Mark Kenneth Govender
74. Lerticia Merlisa Pandohe
75. Gcina Kwenama Nyawo
76. Nomfundo Ngiyabonga Zulu
77. Siphamandla Mantengu
78. Nelisiwe Patricia Mthabela
79. Ntokozo Madlala
80. Hlengiwe S'lungile Mthethwa

==== Limpopo ====
1. Manglemang Rassie Maepa
2. Lilian Managa
3. Makgabo Lawrence Mapoulo
4. Mogaleadi Kgothatso Mogoane
5. Matome Jacob Lebogo
6. Selaelo Regina Mphahlele
7. Walter Samuel Molapo
8. Mapula Gratitude Letsoalo
9. Dumisani Malemela
10. Beauty Soodi
11. Mokwape Lectom Ramalobela
12. Mokgadi Idah Chula
13. Phuti Peter Keetse
14. Abigail Mogofe
15. Thivhilaeli Robert Matidza
16. Tshilidzi Annikie Maraga
17. Matlebjane Abraham Magolo
18. Kgabo Gloria Kubayi
19. Malekutu Karel Sekhukhune
20. Tintswalo Nomhle Baloyi
21. Thabo John Machete
22. Magokong Alice Tshoana
23. Elias Tsomaki Tala
24. Mokwape Florah Madike
25. Gezani Patrick Chauke
26. Zanele Masemola
27. Mooiman Tatane Mosotho
28. Angelina Segwana Mashabela
29. Thabo Justice Skosana
30. Rofhiwa Singo
31. Thatego Nkopodi Kgaphola
32. Thanyani Mawela
33. Thapelo Frans Matjila
34. Meisie Kennedy
35. Abednego Vukosi Chomela
36. Ngakoana Lettie Makhura
37. Tsundukani Austine Mabasa
38. Refilwe Mashela Junior Rafapa
39. Tswaledi Collin Matene
40. Rivengo Martha Maluleka
41. Elvis Tshanyane Magale
42. Mmaseabe Oletta Tlaka
43. Malose Nicodimus Mojela
44. Mmetja Paulina Moshidi
45. Comfort Frans Ngwasheng
46. Tinyiko Florence Manganye
47. Madumetja Sam Thobane
48. Katlego Antonia Lehonye
49. Malesela Solomon Lelaka
50. Millicent Bopape
51. Mohale Ronald Makgothokgo
52. Saluwani Chale
53. Lesetja William Monyela
54. Mapula Portia Dau
55. Tshehlana Solly Moremi
56. Tsakani Grace Hlatswayo
57. Tshifhiwa Patrick Matodzi
58. Lilian Kekana
59. Muhali Wiseman Ramalwa
60. Nkele Sharon Kganyago
61. Lucky Baloyi
62. Mosonya Mathews Semenya
63. Avhasei David Masikhwa
64. Tsebe Juliet Lehonye

==== Mpumalanga ====
1. Michael Collen Sedibe
2. Nomaswazi Urshula Nkambule
3. Rabotlhale Jackson Malatjie
4. Ntsako Precious Mkhabela
5. Rhulani Qhibi
6. Nkateko Danisile Ndlovu
7. Micheal Ngrayi Ngwenya
8. Sindile Temaphanga Lukhele
9. Sam Zandamela
10. Charmaine Jabulile Mngomezulu
11. Dumisani Fannie Mthenjane
12. Ntombikayise Landiwe Mathaba
13. Mpho Edward Morokolo
14. Bridgeth Nobuhle Mkansi
15. Surprise Harold Kubayi
16. Modikoa Esther Molepo
17. Doctor Macsorn Khoza
18. Maggie Thandi Mhlanga
19. Daniel Sebatha Ntuli
20. Tracy Seimela
21. Zwelithini Thandukwazi Fortune Malope
22. Velaphi Malatji
23. Stanley Vusi Hlatshwayo
24. Busisiwe Joyce Mkhwebane
25. Daniel Khoza
26. Ouma Asnath Cossa
27. Tlou Reus Manamela
28. Nunuke Rachel Nkomo
29. Khanya Ceza
30. Salima Sebenzile Mkansi
31. Vusi Silvester Gwebu
32. Lerato Pearl Jeniffer Mapengdi
33. Genius Bongani Tshabangu
34. Busisiwe Maria Shiburi
35. Lucky Koos Dhladhla
36. Marria Swazi Dlamini
37. Rudolf Mjaket Mathonsi
38. Thulisile Nkosi
39. Thabong Hendry Kgwedi
40. Sarah Seipati Machava
41. Phumula Erickson Thabede
42. Anah Sibongile Nhlapo
43. Sabatha Amos Thobela
44. Dimakatso Maggie Phahlamoraswi
45. Godfrey Ludwick Khumalo
46. Linah Florence Sebothoma
47. Mthunzi Roderick Yende
48. Siphiwe Jeanette Mashele
49. Kudumela Johannes Shai
50. Lindiwe Nomonde Precious Nkosi
51. Mygirl Peace Mashego

==== North-West ====
1. Matshidiso Mathews Botswe
2. Primrose Nnana Bogatsu
3. Keobakile Phanuel Babuile
4. Betty Kedisaletse Diale
5. Justice Matuma Dabampe
6. Nokulunga Primrose Sonti
7. Simon Mpatlane Maebane
8. Modiegi Rosey Dikolomela
9. Calvin Ofentse Moema
10. Baratang Cathrine Mokone
11. Kedumetse Israel Monaise
12. Poppy Obakeng Lilian Lebethe
13. Alfred Norman Motsi
14. Lennie Gosekwang Sehole
15. Thapelo Sylvester Phokoje
16. Molebogeng Sharon Letlape
17. Lebogang Emmanuel Xaba
18. Comfort Kgomotso Sikwane
19. Joseph Mekgwa
20. Cordelia Makaleng Shai
21. Mothusi Kenneth Montwedi
22. Tebatso Caroline Maibi
23. Lentekile Koos Shuping
24. Tshiamo Carol Matsheka
25. Tshepang Godfrey Madisa
26. Jeanette Amogelang Matuane
27. Refentse Valencia Motale
28. Sarah Mohale
29. Khomotjo Stanley Komape
30. Semphete Keletso Matsheka
31. Linda Xavier Mabengwane
32. Tsholofelo Brunette Sebolao
33. Tumelo Kenneth Phatladira
34. Mantshabele Martha Moremi
35. Ditiro Justice Mandlasi
36. Lydia Tshepang Machewane
37. Letlhogonolo Vincent Matlhola
38. Nonkie Mary Setshoaro

==== Northern Cape ====
1. Shadrack Lapologang Tlhaole
2. Kerileng Jacqueline Botman
3. Arthwell Kwinana
4. Sibongile Theresa Mazabane-Letebele
5. Moeketsi Kenneth Konote
6. Kamogelo Colyneous Semamai
7. Francis Lebusa Thulo
8. Babongile Bomela
9. Dirk Esau
10. Primrose Noziphiwo Bushula
11. Vincent Welile Ngxila
12. Siphiwe Thandeka Landella
13. Phenyo Joseph Ohentswe
14. Tsholofetso Katlego Gaongalelwe Mocumie
15. Oduetse Simon Kolberg
16. Nontuthuzelo Motswakgomo
17. Goitsemodimo Gilbert Halter
18. Onkageletse Prudence Mashuelele
19. Grecorius George Campbel Slaverse
20. Hilda Morometse
21. Simpiwe Mantho Mrwarwaza
22. Keolebogile Cecilia Mekhoa
23. Challot Anna April
24. Gail Ethel Sibiya
25. Kenneth Corneels Kock
26. Lerato Mellicia Mokwena
27. Duncan Tshepang Moreotsenye
28. Sara Lindiwe Dastile
29. Dugmore Kagisho Makoloi
30. Jesmien Lizzane Dorette Wapad

==== Western Cape ====
1. Aishah Cassiem
2. Mbulelo Jonathan Magwala
3. Thozama Mangcayi
4. [[Goozen Wandile Kasibe]]
5. Carmenieta Natashja Snyders
6. Siphelo Sikolisi
7. Maria Fortuin
8. Xolani Peterson Tshetu
9. Inam Kula
10. Sam Williams
11. Nande Dyantyi
12. Deon Godfrey Leminie
13. Andiswa Carol Madikazi
14. Bulelani Yeko
15. Lezane Erica Swarts
16. John Mosimanegape Mokgosi
17. Onkarabetse Valerei Tong
18. Siyabonga Yalwa
19. Siphokazi Tshaya
20. David Swart
21. Magdeline Gcobisa Gugushe
22. Samuel Kholisile Madlolo
23. Nomzamo Zoya
24. Neil Glen Louw
25. Nomtombi Eunice Kama
26. Yamkela Mxesibe
27. Megan Furgmagan Gaika
28. Mphumzi Fodo
29. Patricia Nontuthuzelo Booi
30. Jacob Diao Lekhori
31. Sindiswa Kori
32. Khanyiso Fodo
33. Lungiswa Ntshuntshe
34. Asantee Abraham Klaasen
35. Lusanda Hilda Mfuku
36. Thulani Mhambi
37. Nomthetho Mazula
38. Siyabonga Mqulwana
39. Linda Mazwi
40. Mila Aphelele Zibi
41. Wendy Thandokazi Vanqa
42. Mbulelo Robert Dwane

== Freedom Front Plus ==
=== National ===
1. **Petrus Johannes Groenewald**
2. **Anton De Waal Alberts**
3. **Cornelius Petrus Mulder**
4. **Wouter Wynand Wessels**
5. **Heloise Denner**
6. **Wynand Johannes Boshoff**
7. **Philippus Adriaan Van Staden**
8. **Tamarin Breedt**
9. **De Wet Nel**
10. **Jaco Mulder**
11. **Ignatius Michael Groenewald**
12. **Stephanus Franszouis Du Toit**
13. **Pieter Mey**
14. Jacobus Johannes Hoffman
15. Arno Roodt
16. Grant Peter Marais
17. Lourens Abraham Erasmus
18. Armand Cloete
19. Jasper Christiaan Hoon
20. Dévar Smit
21. Jacob Petrus Prins
22. Danie Acker
23. Gerhardus Phillipus Leonardus Van Der Merwe
24. Amanda de Lange
25. Peter Marais
26. Isak Petrus Du Plooy
27. Andr? Oldknow
28. Gert Johannes Van Niekerk
29. Frederika Roets Botha-Rossouw
30. Matthys Jacobus Van Tonder
31. Johannes Hartnick
32. Addi Adam Bossau
33. Ella Dorothea Fredrika Lourens
34. Rochelle Robbetze
35. Maria Gloudina Coetzee
36. Jean Kriek
37. Morné Erasmus
38. Theodorus Ernst Joubert
39. Stephanus Petrus Kloppers
40. Danie Coetzee
41. Johan Dietlof Aegidius Blignaut
42. Michiel Adriaan Petrus De Bruyn
43. Cuan Hedley John Elgin
44. Ken Peter Robertson
45. Juan Richard Van Schalkwyk
46. Jan Hendrik Booysen
47. Louis Van Wyk
48. Abraham Petrus Rootman
49. Jacobus Carolus Jc Macfarlane
50. Hendrik Jacobus Van Den Berg
51. Valerie Belinda De Kock
52. Hermanus Stephanus Pretorius
53. Barend Hendrik Josephes Erasmus
54. Barend Jacobus Jordaan
55. Peter Wynand Warnar Meijer
56. Dian Botha
57. Erns Lodewukis Kleynhans
58. Anna Christina Holtzhausen
59. Danie Toerien
60. Louis Beresford Arendse
61. Nicolaas Cornelius Pascoe
62. Jan Andries Palm
63. Francois Reichert
64. Estelle Davies
65. Ignatius Michael Bredenkamp
66. Francios Eugene Cornelius
67. Wilhelm Lourens Reichert
68. Hendrik Frans Cornelius Jordaan
69. Schalk Willem Burger Engelbrecht
70. Gertruida Elizabeth Catharina Marx
71. Lenor Daleen Janse Van Rensburg
72. Anco Barker
73. Maria Elizabeth Tredoux
74. Aletta Catharina Nefdt
75. Johnny Genis Steenkamp
76. Anne-Marie Sparg
77. Déhan Harmse
78. Joshua Ruaan Griffin
79. Benjamin Barend Greyling
80. Jacobus Petrus Burger
81. Gerrit Francouis Matthyse
82. Denise Janse Van Rensburg
83. Willem Adriaan Van Dyk
84. Theuns Lodewyk Johannes Schoeman
85. Henricus Marinus Van Der Ryst
86. Cornelius Johannes Wolmarans
87. Godfrey Skosana
88. Avhapfani Ernest Nemafhohoni
89. Pierré Du Toit
90. Esmé Venter
91. Abraham Jacobus De Klerk
92. Hillel Coetzer
93. Ilonka Botha
94. William Bernard Clayton
95. Daniel Francois Fyfer
96. Liam Richard May
97. Alexander Theodore Wainwright
98. Paul Stephen Jacobson
99. Petrus Johannes Fourie
100. David Peter Langeveldt
101. Johannes Jacobus Allers
102. Chriszaan Du Plessis
103. Werner Ludolf Weber
104. Stefanus Brink
105. Isabelle De Taillefer
106. Gertruida Magrieta Senekal
107. Theunis Bernardus Zimmermann
108. Abraham Isak Jacobus Cato
109. Carel De Villiers Pienaar
110. Andre Moss
111. Nicolaas Nel
112. Marcelle Frieda Maritz
113. Jurie Hendrik Botha
114. Karl Heinrich Weber
115. Johan Van Drimmelen
116. Christo Peyper
117. William Basil Harington
118. Willem De Beer
119. Heinrich Van Der Lith
120. Aranda Donel Nel-Buitendag
121. Gerhard Vermeulen
122. Mariska Elizabeth Oosthuizen-Van Tonder
123. Johannes Swart
124. Eric Douglas Wesch
125. Sonia Carol Pheiffers
126. Karin Annette Depken
127. Anna Maria Badenhorst
128. Francis Johannes Robbetze
129. Jefrey Van Wyk
130. Frederik Jacobus Erasmus
131. Naomi Nel
132. Andries Petrus De Bruto
133. Lourens Johannes Gouws
134. Andries Gerhardus De Villiers
135. Robert Ernest Griebenow
136. William James Markram
137. Magrietha Susanna Louw
138. Lee-Ann Scott
139. Johnathan Crooks Haarhoff
140. André Nolan Jacobs
141. George Henry Portwig
142. Paulette Lucille Stammer
143. Nadine Kruger
144. Cornelis Albertus Coetzee
145. Johanna Maria De Beer
146. Roche Jacques Grebe
147. Stephan Landsberg
148. Maria Cornelia Heymans
149. Hendrik Rudolf Liebenberg
150. Albertus Johannes Van Der Westhuyzen
151. Adriaan Johannes Du Plessis
152. Sunette Jooste
153. Pieter Ernst Beyers O'riley
154. Ramadumetsa Idah Maloka
155. Adriaan Rothner Van Heerden
156. Johan Daniel Cloete
157. Frans Jacobus Esterhuyse
158. Charmaine Sequeira
159. Hendrik Francois De Villiers
160. Malcolm David Grimbeek
161. Christina Muller
162. Isabella Fredrieka Van Zyl
163. Louise Heunis
164. Wesley Andr? Jacobs
165. Ernest Anthony Deane
166. Deborah Anne Theron
167. Melinda Hattingh
168. Mark Phillip Penkin
169. Hendrik Jacobus De Bruyn
170. Khalirendwe Thenga
171. Annamarie Steyn
172. Etienne Cronje
173. Mattheus Johannes Koekemoer
174. Roderick Charles Vencencie
175. Renier Nel
176. Petrus Arnoldus Du Preez
177. Lilian Mari Slabbert
178. Quinten Chordnum
179. Herman Jean Nyenhuis
180. Antoinette Elaine Paulse
181. Moegamat Ayub Abrahams
182. Marius Müller
183. Ockert Petrus Lategan
184. Basil Peter Cupido
185. Angelic Dorothy Van Den Berg
186. Thatale David Moela
187. Chandré De Bruyn
188. Theunis Van Eeden Coetzee
189. Willem Hendrik Liebenberg
190. Jennifer Anne Glover
191. Cornelis Boer
192. Tjaart Johannes Steenkamp
193. Dirk Johannes Jacobus Van Der Spuy
194. Pieter Josua Hendrik De Necker
195. Cecilia Magrita Deetlefs
196. Pierre Ackermann
197. Christian Bartho Lombard
198. Lucinde Eleonore Dürr
199. Hillten Janse Van Rensburg
200. Anna Johanna Steyn

=== Regional ===
==== Eastern Cape ====
1. William Basil Harington
2. Jacobus Petrus Burger
3. Roderick Charles Vencencie
4. Robert Ernest Griebenow
5. Albertus Johannes Van Der Westhuyzen
6. Adriaan Rothner Van Heerden
7. Moegamat Ayub Abrahams
8. Deborah Anne Theron
9. Lilian Mari Slabbert
10. Wilhelmus Gerhardus Van Der Linde
11. Sharon Nel
12. Phinda Princess Mapetshana
13. Lize Marié Van Onselen
14. Pieter Veldtman
15. Marlon Booysen
16. Tertius Kleynhans

==== Free State ====
1. Heloise Denner
2. Tamarin Breedt
3. Michiel Adriaan Petrus De Bruyn
4. Valerie Belinda De Kock
5. Hermanus Stephanus Pretorius
6. Dian Botha
7. Johannes Swart
8. Chriszaan Du Plessis
9. Maria Cornelia Heymans
10. Hendrik Rudolf Liebenberg

==== Gauteng ====
1. Philippus Adriaan Van Staden
2. Frederik Jacobus Mulder
3. Anton De Waal Alberts
4. Lourens Abraham Erasmus
5. Jacobus Johannes Hoffman
6. Devar Smit
7. Gertruida Magrieta Senekal
8. Amanda De Lange
9. Abraham Isak Jacobus Cato
10. Jean Kriek
11. Morné Erasmus
12. Barend Hendrik Josephes Erasmus
13. Peter Wynand Warnar Meijer
14. Johan Van Drimmelen
15. Danie Toerien
16. Nicolaas Cornelius Pascoe
17. Ignatius Michael Bredenkamp
18. Gertruida Elizabeth Catharina Marx
19. Lenor Daleen Janse Van Rensburg
20. Aletta Catharina Nefdt
21. Anne‐Marie Sparg
22. André Nolan Jacobs
23. Denise Janse Van Rensburg
24. Roche Jacques Grebe
25. Theuns Lodewyk Johannes Schoeman
26. Wesley André Jacobs
27. Ilonka Botha
28. Petrus Johannes Fourie
29. Arno Roodt
30. Isak Petrus Du Plooy
31. Heinrich Van Der Lith
32. Anna Maria Badenhorst
33. Lourens Johannes Gouws
34. Déhan Harmse
35. Benjamin Barend Greyling
36. George Henry Portwig
37. Pieter Ernst Beyers O'riley
38. Frans Jacobus Esterhuyse
39. Hendrik Francois De Villiers
40. Khalirendwe Thenga
41. Annamarie Steyn
42. Alexander Theodore Wainwright
43. Herman Jean Nyenhuis
44. Angelic Dorothy Van Den Berg
45. Jennifer Anne Glover
46. Cornelis Boer
47. Tjaart Johannes Steenkamp

==== KwaZulu-Natal ====
1. Rochelle Robbetze
2. Francios Eugene Cornelius
3. Henricus Marinus Van Der Ryst
4. Francis Johannes Robbetze
5. Etienne Cronje
6. Marius Müller
7. Chanelle Amori Erasmus
8. Kay‐Leigh Magna Gonçalves De Sousa Maia
9. Marinda Kellie
10. Andrea Jaylene Labuschagne
11. Anneke Lange
12. Leon Prinsloo
13. Wynand Lukas Erasmus
14. Pierre Kellie
15. Mathilda Hendrika Robbetse
16. Quindru Dittrich

==== Limpopo ====
1. Andre Moss
2. Barend Jacobus Jordaan
3. Willem De Beer
4. Ramadumetsa Idah Maloka
5. Johan Daniel Cloete
6. Avhapfani Ernest Nemafhohoni
7. Frederik Jacobus Erasmus
8. Magrietha Susanna Louw
9. Godfrey Skosana
10. Thatale David Moela
11. Mariëtte Roos
12. Catharina Elizabeth Greyling
13. Dina Johanna Susanna Koegelenberg
14. Mariska Maritz
15. Jacoba Adriana Pullen
16. Susanna Elizabeth Clarke
17. Werner Leonard Esterhuizen
18. Pieter Willem Gerber
19. Paul Phillipus Johannes Herman
20. Henry Richard Adriaan Lubbe

==== Mpumalanga ====
1. Karl Heinrich Weber
2. Johan Dietlof Aegidius Blignaut
3. Ken Peter Robertson
4. Johnathan Crooks Haarhoff
5. Willem Adriaan Van Dyk
6. Cornelius Johannes Wolmarans
7. Hillel Coetzer
8. Liam Richard May
9. Werner Ludolf Weber
10. Carel De Villiers Pienaar
11. Christo Peyper
12. Aranda Donel Nel‐Buitendag
13. Andries Petrus De Bruto
14. Nadine Kruger
15. Corné Erasmus

==== North West ====
1. Ignatius Michael Groenewald
2. De Wet Nel
3. Stephanus Franszouis Du Toit
4. Gerhardus Phillipus Leonardus Van Der Merwe
5. Matthys Jacobus Van Tonder
6. Ella Dorothea Fredrika Lourens
7. Stephanus Petrus Kloppers
8. Abraham Petrus Rootman
9. Joshua Ruaan Griffin
10. Esmé Venter
11. Melinda Hattingh
12. Addi Adam Bossau
13. Erns Lodewukis Kleynhans

==== Northern Cape ====
1. Wynand Johannes Boshoff
2. Theodorus Ernst Joubert
3. Daniel Johannes Coetzee
4. Maria Gloudina Coetzee
5. Jan Andries Palm

==== Western Cape ====
1. Cornelius Petrus Mulder
2. Danie Acker
3. Jasper Christiaan Hoon
4. Gert Johannes Van Niekerk
5. Jacob Petrus Prins
6. Petrus Jacobus Marais
7. André Oldknow
8. Frederika Roets Botha‐Rossouw
9. Johannes Hartnick
10. Cuan Hedley John Elgin
11. Juan Richard Van Schalkwyk
12. Louis Beresford Arendse
13. Gerhard Vermeulen
14. Anco Barker
15. Naomi Nel
16. Johnny Genis Steenkamp
17. Paulette Lucille Stammer
18. Gerrit Francouis Matthyse
19. Adriaan Johannes Du Plessis
20. Pierré Du Toit
21. Abraham Jacobus De Klerk
22. William Bernard Clayton
23. Daniel Francois Fyfer
24. Mattheus Johannes Koekemoer

=== Provincial ===
==== Eastern Cape ====
1. Pieter Mey
2. William Basil Harington
3. Robert Ernest Griebenow
4. Jacobus Petrus Burger
5. Albertus Johannes Van Der Westhuyzen
6. Adriaan Rothner Van Heerden
7. Moegamat Ayub Abrahams
8. Deborah Anne Theron
9. Lilian Mari Slabbert
10. Roderick Charles Vencencie
11. Wilhelmus Gerhardus Van Der Linde
12. Sharon Nel
13. Phinda Princess Mapetshana
14. Lize Marié Van Onselen
15. Pieter Veldtman
16. Marlon Booysen
17. Tertius Kleynhans

==== Free State ====
1. Johannes Marthunis Van Niekerk
2. Heloise Denner
3. Armand Benjamin Cloete
4. Chriszaan Du Plessis
5. Tamarin Breedt
6. Michiel Adriaan Petrus De Bruyn
7. Valerie Belinda De Kock
8. Dian Botha
9. Hermanus Stephanus Pretorius
10. Johannes Swart
11. Maria Cornelia Heymans
12. Hendrik Rudolf Liebenberg
13. Sunette Jooste
14. Louise Heunis
15. Mark Phillip Penkin
16. Renier Nel
17. Phillippus Petrus Van Der Merwe
18. Willem Abraham Potgieter
19. Louis Van Wyk
20. Michiel Frederik Odendaal
21. Braam Vorster
22. Paul Louis Saaiman
23. Thomas Bernhardus Richardt Janse Van Rensburg
24. Charl Kalamer
25. Joepie Bosman Marais
26. Mare-Lize Wewege
27. Desmond Reed
28. Christian Bartho Lombard
29. Jan Johannes Jacobus Coetzee
30. Rika Nel

==== Gauteng ====
1. Frederik Jacobus Mulder
2. Anton De Waal Alberts
3. Jacobus Johannes Hoffman
4. Lourens Abraham Erasmus
5. Arno Roodt
6. Amanda De Lange
7. Gertruida Magrieta Senekal
8. Devar Smit
9. Isak Petrus Du Plooy
10. Abraham Isak Jacobus Cato
11. Jean Kriek
12. Morné Erasmus
13. Barend Hendrik Josephes Erasmus
14. Peter Wynand Warnar Meijer
15. Johan Van Drimmelen
16. Danie Toerien
17. Nicolaas Cornelius Pascoe
18. Heinrich Van Der Lith
19. Ignatius Michael Bredenkamp
20. Anna Maria Badenhorst
21. Gertruida Elizabeth Catharina Marx
22. Lenor Daleen Janse Van Rensburg
23. Lourens Johannes Gouws
24. Aletta Catharina Nefdt
25. Déhan Harmse
26. Benjamin Barend Greyling
27. André Nolan Jacobs
28. George Henry Portwig
29. Denise Janse Van Rensburg
30. Roche Jacques Grebe
31. Theuns Lodewyk Johannes Schoeman
32. Pieter Ernst Beyers O'riley
33. Frans Jacobus Esterhuyse
34. Hendrik Francois De Villiers
35. Wesley Andr? Jacobs
36. Ilonka Botha
37. Khalirendwe Thenga
38. Annamarie Steyn
39. Petrus Johannes Fourie
40. Herman Jean Nyenhuis
41. Angelic Dorothy Van Den Berg
42. Philippus Adriaan Van Staden
43. Anne-Marie Sparg
44. Alexander Theodore Wainwright
45. Jennifer Anne Glover
46. Cornelis Boer
47. Tjaart Johannes Steenkamp
48. Dirk Johannes Jacobus Van Der Spuy
49. Albertus Adriaan Lubbe
50. Johannes Petrus Jacobus Liebenberg
51. Dani?L Frederik Viljoen
52. Pieter Josua Hendrik De Necker
53. Cecilia Magrita Deetlefs
54. Pierre Ackermann
55. Sumare Van Staden
56. Lucinde Eleonore Dürr
57. Hillten Janse Van Rensburg
58. Anna Johanna Steyn
59. Tanya Marais
60. Frans-Petrus Zeelie
61. Maarten Petrus Albertus Coetsee

==== KwaZulu-Natal ====
1. Rochelle Robbetze
2. Francios Eugene Cornelius
3. Francis Johannes Robbetze
4. Henricus Marinus Van Der Ryst
5. Etienne Cronje
6. Marius Müller
7. Chanelle Amori Erasmus
8. Kay-Leigh Magna Gonçalves De Sousa Maia
9. Marinda Kellie
10. Andrea Jaylene Labuschagne
11. Anneke Lange
12. Leon Prinsloo
13. Wynand Lukas Erasmus
14. Pierre Kellie
15. Mathilda Hendrika Robbetse
16. Quindru Dittrich

==== Limpopo ====
1. Marcelle Frieda Maritz
2. Andre Moss
3. Frederik Jacobus Erasmus
4. Barend Jacobus Jordaan
5. Magrietha Susanna Louw
6. Ramadumetsa Idah Maloka
7. Godfrey Skosana
8. Avhapfani Ernest Nemafhohoni
9. Thatale David Moela
10. Willem De Beer
11. Johan Daniel Cloete
12. Pieter Willem Gerber
13. Mari?Tte Roos
14. Johannes Pieter Prinsloo
15. Hendrik Wessels Venter
16. Catharina Elizabeth Greyling
17. Karel Hendrik Niewenhuis
18. Mariska Maritz
19. Gieliam Machiel Van Niekerk
20. Dina Johanna Susanna Koegelenberg
21. Cornelius Johannes Pretorius
22. Jacoba Adriana Pullen
23. Susanna Elizabeth Clarke
24. Werner Leonard Esterhuizen
25. Paul Phillipus Johannes Herman
26. Elita Wiid
27. Henry Richard Adriaan Lubbe
28. Manicks Nini Mpunwana
29. Charmaine Bothma
30. Casper Jan Hendrik Steenkamp
31. Dries Prinsloo

==== Mpumalanga ====
1. Werner Ludolf Weber
2. Karl Heinrich Weber
3. Johan Dietlof Aegidius Blignaut
4. Carel De Villiers Pienaar
5. Ken Peter Robertson
6. Christo Peyper
7. Aranda Donel Nel-Buitendag
8. Andries Petrus De Bruto
9. Johnathan Crooks Haarhoff
10. Nadine Kruger
11. Willem Adriaan Van Dyk
12. Cornelius Johannes Wolmarans
13. Hillel Coetzer
14. Liam Richard May
15. Corné Erasmus
16. Maruis Jacobus Germishuizen
17. Samuel Nzani Mahlangu
18. Debra Anelda Postma
19. Zelda Robertson
20. Reynhardt Van Aarde

==== North-West ====
1. Ignatius Michael Groenewald
2. De Wet Nel
3. Stephanus Franszouis Du Toit
4. Gerhardus Phillipus Leonardus Van Der Merwe
5. Matthys Jacobus Van Tonder
6. Addi Adam Bossau
7. Ella Dorothea Fredrika Lourens
8. Stephanus Petrus Kloppers
9. Abraham Petrus Rootman
10. Erns Lodewukis Kleynhans
11. Anna Christina Holtzhausen
12. Mariska Elizabeth Oosthuizen-Van Tonder
13. Hendrik Frans Cornelius Jordaan
14. Joshua Ruaan Griffin
15. Lee-Ann Scott
16. Johanna Maria De Beer
17. Esmé Venter
18. Melinda Hattingh
19. Hendrik Jacobus De Bruyn
20. Petrus Arnoldus Du Preez
21. Chandré De Bruyn
22. Hermanus Van Der Westhuizen
23. Rachelle Steenkamp
24. Petronella Natalia Fourie
25. Helmien Ayres
26. Gullaume Clouston
27. Joanita Petricia Labuschagne
28. Johannes Elardus Klopper
29. Donae Linde
30. Chan?L Groenewald
31. Marli Du Preez
32. Jodene Botes
33. Jurie Hendrik Botha
34. Elizabeth Christina Le Roux
35. Timotheus Francois Potgieter
36. Petrus Jakobus Breet
37. Corene Prinsloo
38. Deon Botes

==== Northern Cape ====
1. Wynand Johannes Boshoff
2. Theodorus Ernst Joubert
3. Daniel Johannes Coetzee
4. Maria Gloudina Coetzee
5. Hendrik Jacobus Van Den Berg
6. Jan Andries Palm
7. Jan Hendrik Booysen
8. Francois Reichert
9. Estelle Davies
10. Wilhelm Lourens Reichert
11. Karin Annette Depken
12. Schalk Willem Burger Engelbrecht
13. Maria Elizabeth Tredoux
14. William James Markram
15. Cornelis Albertus Coetzee
16. Esme Malanie Boshoff
17. Johan Dawid Griesel
18. Josias Andries Engelbrecht Louw
19. Liza Van Den Berg
20. Karlien Gerda Reichert
21. Johan Smit
22. Elizabeth Susara Malan Boshoff

==== Western Cape ====
1. Cornelius Petrus Mulder
2. Grant Peter Marais
3. Gert Johannes Van Niekerk
4. Isabelle De Taillefer
5. Danie Acker
6. Frederika Roets Botha-Rossouw
7. Petrus Jacobus Marais
8. Jasper Christiaan Hoon
9. Andr? Oldknow
10. Juan Richard Van Schalkwyk
11. Nicolaas Nel
12. Cuan Hedley John Elgin
13. Johannes Jacobus Allers
14. Stefanus Brink
15. Louis Beresford Arendse
16. Eric Douglas Wesch
17. Sonia Carol Pheiffers
18. Anco Barker
19. Jefrey Van Wyk
20. Naomi Nel
21. Andries Gerhardus De Villiers
22. Johnny Genis Steenkamp
23. Gerrit Francouis Matthyse
24. Stephan Landsberg
25. Adriaan Johannes Du Plessis
26. Charmaine Sequeira
27. Pierré Du Toit
28. Malcolm David Grimbeek
29. Abraham Jacobus De Klerk
30. Isabella Fredrieka Van Zyl
31. Ernest Anthony Deane
32. William Bernard Clayton
33. Daniel Francois Fyfer
34. Paul Stephen Jacobson
35. Quinten Chordnum
36. Antoinette Elaine Paulse
37. Christina Muller
38. David Peter Langeveldt
39. Theunis Van Eeden Coetzee
40. Willem Hendrik Liebenberg
41. Jacob Petrus Prins
42. Theunis Bernardus Zimmermann

== Good ==
=== National ===
1. **Patricia De Lille**
2. **Brett Norton Herron**
3. Kerwin Tsosamotse Lebone
4. Suzette Ann Little
5. Dymian Rufus Kühn
6. Charity Wendy Nare
7. Chad Owen Davids
8. Kaden James Arguile
9. Sarah Makaoka Mabotsa Mabotsa
10. Ferdinand Heinrich Hermann Kehrhahn
11. Samuel Shabane
12. Roscoe Harold Palm
13. Dewan Deon De Swardt
14. Maxine Kim Pereira
15. Deonette Andria Cedras
16. Joy Davids
17. Fatima Felicity Matsio
18. Thelma Redgard
19. Yandisa Tshotwana
20. Hubert Clement Titus
21. Thyrone Jacodam Williams
22. Cynthia Cathrine Clayton
23. Godfrey Saul
24. Nombulelo Maria Motaung
25. Alfred Matsobane Makola
26. Menahem Modimang Chiloane
27. Hubert Sebastian Hendricks
28. Heidi Alson
29. Tshembani Wyse Mkhabela
30. Katriena Robyn
31. David Vusi Monareng
32. Dino Proenca Arrestim Azevedo
33. Brian Desmond Kivedo
34. Lloyd Eisenhower Phillips
35. John Robert Michels
36. Mzwandile Nxokwana
37. Thabo Charles Pheku
38. Gregchan Garreth Barnardo
39. André Rix
40. Bernice Verona Esbend
41. Donay Caylin October
42. Joleen Carlo March
43. Xolisa Gxothwe
44. Joseph Richard Nichols Nefdt
45. Johan Van Schalkwyk
46. Vernon Ronald Samuels
47. Vhutshilo Ramadwa
48. Daniel Wellington Thabo Namo
49. John Abraham Baardt
50. Anghenick Froneha Jonas
51. Dustin Peter Scott
52. Naa-Ielah Ameerah January
53. Samson Chelepe Masilo
54. Jessica Maduramuthu
55. Ntuthuko Gift Masondo
56. Thabiso Daniel Maleke
57. Andrew Hess
58. Hymne Peter Rossouw
59. Njabulo Professor Mthethwa
60. Sandile Mtshali
61. Nqobile Tshabalala
62. Savvas Stephanos Tiqua
63. Anthony William Malan
64. Philidelphia Patricia Hartzenberg
65. Precious Motsepe
66. Roland Clarance Hogins
67. Gez?Le Christelle Manikus
68. Doreen Carolissen
69. Dovhani Nicholas Leshiba
70. Teshle Sybil De Koker
71. Cassandra Anna Susanna Younes
72. James Moses Golden
73. Nico Sylvester
74. Baitsi Mack Tshekolo
75. Shantel Danielle Ramokhobi
76. Louise Charlotte Basson
77. Tiisetso Michael Thulo
78. Roland Pieter Fallie
79. Lizza Oliphant
80. Samson Mpampi
81. Mokgadi Rosina Kekae
82. Jeremy Virgil Janse
83. Samson Kgosietsile Macomo
84. Felicia Veronica Ann Manel

=== Regional ===
==== Eastern Cape ====
1. Brian Desmond Kivedo
2. Xolisa Gxothwe
3. Maxine Kim Pereira
4. Hubert Sebastian Hendricks
5. Hymne Peter Rossouw

==== Free State ====
1. Dino Proenca Arrestim Azevedo
2. Samson Chelepe Masilo
3. Motseki Paulus Monamathe
4. Tiisetso Michael Thulo

==== Gauteng ====
1. Sarah Makaoka Mabotsa Mabotsa
2. Ferdinand Heinrich Hermann Kehrhahn
3. Lloyd Eisenhower Phillips
4. Nombulelo Maria Motaung
5. Dewan Deon De Swardt
6. Thabo Charles Pheku
7. Samuel Shabane
8. Johannes Phure Cutshwa
9. Daniel Wellington Thabo Namo
10. John Abraham Baardt
11. Naa‐Ielah Ameerah January
12. David Vusi Monareng
13. Nqobile Tshabalala
14. Roland Clarance Hogins
15. Precious Motsepe
16. Gezéle Christelle Manikus
17. Dovhani Nicholas Leshiba
18. Cassandra Anna Susanna Younes
19. James Moses Golden
20. Baitsi Mack Tshekolo
21. Louise Charlotte Basson

==== KwaZulu-Natal ====
1. Charity Wendy Nare
2. Bernice Verona Esbend
3. Jessica Maduramuthu
4. Njabulo Professor Mthethwa
5. Sandile Mtshali

==== Limpopo ====
1. Alfred Matsobane Makola
2. Mokgadi Rosina Kekae
3. Vhutshilo Ramadwa

==== Mpumalanga ====
1. Menahem Modimang Chiloane
2. Ntuthuko Gift Masondo
3. Dawid Johannes Bezuidenhout

==== North West ====
1. Yandisa Tshotwana
2. Tshembani Wyse Mkhabela
3. Peter Thabo Kgaje

==== Northern Cape ====
1. Godfrey Saul
2. Fatima Felicity Matsio
3. Anthony William Malan
4. Deonette Andria Cedras
5. Samson Kgosietsile Macomo

==== Western Cape ====
1. Patricia De Lille
2. John Robert Michels
3. Hubert Clement Titus
4. Thyrone Jacodam Williams
5. Anghenick Froneha Jonas
6. Cynthia Cathrine Clayton
7. Mzwandile Nxokwana
8. Katriena Robyn
9. Thabiso Daniel Maleke
10. Gregchan Garreth Barnardo
11. André Rix
12. Donay Caylin October
13. Joleen Carlo March
14. Joseph Richard Nichols Nefdt
15. Johan Van Schalkwyk
16. Vernon Ronald Samuels
17. Heidi Alson
18. Dustin Peter Scott
19. Philidelphia Patricia Hartzenberg
20. Joy Davids
21. Andrew Hess
22. Savvas Stephanos Tiqua
23. Doreen Carolissen
24. Teshle Sybil De Koker

=== Provincial ===
==== Eastern Cape ====
1. Hubert Sebastian Hendricks
2. Xolisa Gxothwe
3. Maxine Kim Pereira
4. Brian Desmond Kivedo
5. Hymne Peter Rossouw

==== Free State ====
1. Dino Proenca Arrestim Azevedo
2. Tiisetso Michael Thulo
3. Samson Chelepe Masilo
4. Motseki Paulus Monamathe

==== Gauteng ====
1. Matthew Cook
2. Thelma Redgard
3. Sarah Makaoka Mabotsa Mabotsa
4. Lloyd Eisenhower Phillips
5. Ferdinand Heinrich Hermann Kehrhahn
6. Thabo Charles Pheku
7. David Vusi Monareng
8. Dewan Deon De Swardt
9. Samuel Shabane
10. Nombulelo Maria Motaung
11. Precious Motsepe
12. Daniel Wellington Thabo Namo
13. John Abraham Baardt
14. Nqobile Tshabalala
15. Roland Clarance Hogins
16. Johannes Phure Cutshwa
17. Gez?Le Christelle Manikus
18. Dovhani Nicholas Leshiba
19. Cassandra Anna Susanna Younes
20. James Moses Golden
21. Baitsi Mack Tshekolo
22. Louise Charlotte Basson

==== KwaZulu-Natal ====
1. Charity Wendy Nare
2. Bernice Verona Esbend
3. Jessica Maduramuthu
4. Njabulo Professor Mthethwa
5. Sandile Mtshali

==== Limpopo ====
1. Alfred Matsobane Makola
2. Mokgadi Rosina Kekae
3. Vhutshilo Ramadwa

==== Mpumalanga ====
1. Menahem Modimang Chiloane
2. Ntuthuko Gift Masondo
3. Dawid Johannes Bezuidenhout

==== North-West ====
1. Tshembani Wyse Mkhabela
2. Yandisa Tshotwana
3. Peter Thabo Kgaje

==== Northern Cape ====
1. Deonette Andria Cedras
2. Godfrey Saul
3. Fatima Felicity Matsio
4. Gashwane Lucas Tshitlho
5. Anthony William Malan
6. Samson Kgosietsile Macomo
7. Lizza Oliphant
8. Samson Mpampi

==== Western Cape ====
1. Patricia De Lille
2. Brett Norton Herron
3. Suzette Ann Little
4. Joy Davids
5. John Robert Michels
6. Mzwandile Nxokwana
7. Chad Owen Davids
8. Thyrone Jacodam Williams
9. Roscoe Harold Palm
10. Dymian Rufus Kühn
11. Hubert Clement Titus
12. Cynthia Cathrine Clayton
13. Gregchan Garreth Barnardo
14. Katriena Robyn
15. André Rix
16. Donay Caylin October
17. Joleen Carlo March
18. Joseph Richard Nichols Nefdt
19. Johan Van Schalkwyk
20. Vernon Ronald Samuels
21. Heidi Alson
22. Anghenick Froneha Jonas
23. Dustin Peter Scott
24. Thabiso Daniel Maleke
25. Andrew Hess
26. Savvas Stephanos Tiqua
27. Philidelphia Patricia Hartzenberg
28. Doreen Carolissen
29. Teshle Sybil De Koker
30. Nico Sylvester
31. Shantel Danielle Ramokhobi
32. Jeremy Virgil Janse
33. Felicia Veronica Ann Manel

== Independent candidates ==
=== Regional ===
Some independent candidates appear on the regional lists for more than one region.

==== Free State ====
1. Louis Petrus Liebenberg

==== Gauteng ====
1. Louis Petrus Liebenberg
2. Anele Mda
3. Lehlohonolo Blessings Answer Ramoba

==== Limpopo ====
1. Louis Petrus Liebenberg
2. Lovemore Ray Ndou
3. Ntakadzeni Faith Phathela
4. Lehlohonolo Blessings Answer Ramoba

==== Mpumalanga ====
1. Louis Petrus Liebenberg

==== Western Cape ====
1. Zackie Achmat

=== Provincial ===
==== Free State ====
1. Ramotswabodi Johannes Sesing

==== Gauteng ====
1. Bongani Wellington Cibi
2. Tshepo Johannes Mogano

==== Kwazulu-Natal ====
1. Thanasagren Rubbanathan Moodley

==== Limpopo ====
1. Matsobane Gerald Mokonyane
2. Lovemore Ray Ndou

== Inkatha Freedom Party ==
=== National ===
1. **Velenkosini Hlabisa**
2. **Narend Singh**
3. **Mkhuleko Hlengwa**
4. **Mangaqa Albert Mncwango**
5. **Zandile Majozi**
6. **Liezl Van Der Merwe**
7. Zuzifa Buthelezi
8. **Nhlanhla Mzungezwa Hadebe**
9. Dalsy Bantlhoi Manganyi
10. Albert Sepatake Mokoena
11. Anthony Christopher Mitchell
12. Thokozane Sabelo Mdluli
13. Ndlelenhle Ndoda Gumede
14. Victoria Thobeka Mntambo
15. Muhanelwa Mundalamo
16. Yvonne Kesebelwang Phakoe
17. **Magdalena Hlengwa**
18. Mondli Cyril Funeka
19. Godslove Lungani Magubane
20. Mzokuthula Mzobe
21. Sikhumbuzo Clement Gama
22. Ritta Lindani Msweli
23. Thembi Margaret Tembe
24. Sphindile Patience Mzila
25. Ningi Penelope Gumede
26. Abel Mthenjwa Hlongwane
27. Freedom Bongani Chili
28. Phindile Perseverence Nene
29. Mala Doovsamy Moodley
30. Phiwokuhle Ngubane

=== Provincial ===
==== Eastern Cape ====
1. Dingalethu Sakhumzi Nogqala
2. Lonwabo Ntaphane
3. Mthabiseni Landa

==== Free State ====
1. Obbett Zwelinzima Gqozo
2. Fortunate Tseko Rapuleng
3. Dimakatso Suzan Mokhina-Msiska
4. Doi Cornelius Hlahane
5. Simon Motsamai Tsotetsi
6. Petrus Vusimuzi Kheza
7. Disebo Maserame Maria Makole
8. Majwetse John Lehlokoanyana
9. Sipho Januarie Mbele
10. Thuso Pythagorous Mokake
11. Ntsenki Sophie Motloung

==== Gauteng ====
1. Bonginkosi Wesley Dhlamini
2. Mlungisi Providence Mabaso
3. Abigail Ramakoaba
4. Madoda Simon Yende
5. Mvelo Inocent Mchunu
6. Lucky Sixolo
7. Zitha Piet Buthelezi
8. Nondumiso Patricia Samkelisiwe Zungu
9. Bongukwanda Ellias Ngcobo
10. Zanela Esselinah Yende
11. Joshua Mbuso Zulu
12. Muzingezwa Buhlebenkosi Zondi
13. Sambulo Wiseman Ndwandwe

==== KwaZulu-Natal ====
1. Arthur Thamsanqa Ntuli
2. Muziwenkosi Blessed Gwala
3. Thembeni Petty Mthethwa
4. Phumzile Audrey Thandekile Nokuphiwa Buthelezi
5. Petros Nhlanhla Msimango
6. Mncedisi Cyril Maphisa
7. Otto Bonginkosi Kunene
8. Mntomuhle Khawula
9. Thulasizwe Dominic Buthelezi
10. Ncamisile Jerich Nkwanyana
11. Poobalan Govender
12. Satishrai Bhanprakash
13. Lourens Johannes De Klerk
14. Noluthando Patricia Ngubane
15. Andile Clifford Biyela
16. Keith Muntuwenkosi Zondi
17. Bonginkosi Thomas Buthelezi
18. Mbongeleni Joshua Mazibuko
19. Nonhlanhla Pretty Ntuli
20. Makhosonke Bethuel Sithole
21. Sipho Andrias Mvelase
22. Donatus Thulabezwe Dlamini
23. Sebenzile Ladyfair Xulu
24. Petros Mthandeni Ngubane
25. Moses Zamindlela Ngamizizizwe Madlala
26. Mandy Michael
27. Mbongiseni Moses Thabede
28. Mzokuthula Mzobe
29. Velangenkosi Mfaniseni Gumede
30. Mandla Tholithemba Makatini
31. Real Winile Dlamini
32. Mqapheli Mduduzi Dube
33. Lindokuhle Maphumulo
34. Bhekizenzo Canaan Dubazana
35. Sithabiso Wonder Gwala
36. Thulasizwe Patrick Khumalo
37. Siyanda Mathe
38. Thembelihle Gugu Lizzy Shabalala
39. Joyce Nomakhosi Shabalala
40. Bhekithemba Jerome Mncwango
41. Bhekinkosi Richman Buthelezi
42. Bongwayinkosi Cebo Zikhali
43. Mbekezeli Emmanuel Zondo
44. Mzomuhle Silindelo Dlamini
45. Buyiswa Princess Ngcobo
46. Petros Bhekinkosi Madlopha
47. Nicholas Maqhawe Gumede
48. Nothando Prudence Mchunu
49. Thenjiwe Majozi
50. Khonzindaba Ephraim Thabede
51. Zenzele Manqoba Mfayela
52. Nontokozo Londiwe Ngubane
53. Sibusiso Emmanual Mathenjwa
54. Nozipho Sihle Xaba
55. Mkhuzeni Johannes Hlongwane
56. Philani Jetro Mabuyakhulu
57. Thokozile Joyce Gumede
58. Cebile Nomfundo Biyela
59. Nkosinathi Mantengu
60. Maureen Mahlaba
61. Mzobusayo Gabela
62. Fezile Abigail Khoza
63. Xoliswa Cebile Mkhize
64. Nhlanhla Mhlophe Alex Ngcobo
65. Lucas Shlangu Ntuli
66. Sanele Nomshado Nokuthula Hadebe
67. Muziwendoda Joel Mthembu
68. Nkosinathi Blessing Biyela
69. Lindokuhle Happiness Zondi
70. Bongumusa Edmund Duma
71. Mtshengiseni Andries Zulu
72. Fanelesibonge Ulyate Dladla
73. Thembokukhona Erick Mdletshe
74. Lungani Herbert Khoza
75. Busisiwe Zandile Shandu
76. Sifundo Benedict Msweli
77. Nyanga Doctor Ndlangamandla
78. Sharron Thamsanqa Khumalo
79. Edward Mngadi
80. Octavia Nomusa Gumede

==== Limpopo ====
1. Mafakhale Alphios Makamu
2. Azwidohwi Ravele
3. Makgale Isaya Phasha
4. Promise Mbombi
5. Mzamani Steyn Mboweni
6. Mmaphoko Pabalelo Mamadise
7. Eulandar Deliwe Mathebula

==== Mpumalanga ====
1. Mthunzi Patrick Khumalo
2. Sipho Glen Njokweni
3. Fikelephi Jabulisiwe Sikhakhane
4. Eric Jacob Khumalo
5. Nomusa Nothando Mbatha
6. Nombulelo Nozipho Mbuli
7. Sindisiwe Pearl Mgaga
8. Xolani Siyabonga Perseverence Mbokane
9. Zanele Prisca Glorian Mthimunye
10. Joyce Zinhle Dlamini
11. Mthokozisi Frederick Mtshali
12. Halalisani Buthelezi

==== North-West ====
1. Temba Bennet Gwabeni
2. Matthews Makakaoba Chuma
3. Bongani Percivell Tsotetsi
4. Petrus Mokete Tshula
5. Bafedile Antonette Emily Mdluli
6. Zodwa Buthelezi
7. Kearabetswe Monageng
8. Francina Lena Molefe

==== Northern Cape ====
1. Benjamin Oswald Monyatsi
2. Keilelwang Elizabeth Mooki
3. Beatrice Gomolemo Mabotsa

==== Western Cape ====
1. Anthony Christopher Mitchell

== National Freedom Party ==
=== National ===
1. Ivan Rowan Barnes
2. Milton Ndida Sokhela
3. Bawinile Vimbile Mhlongo
4. Duduzile Treasure Malinga
5. Busisiwe Prisca Hlatshwayo
6. Edward Thubalethu Thwala
7. Qaphelani Sibusiso Dlamini
8. Nelisiwe Sweetness Linda
9. Bhekisisa Wiseman Ntshangase
10. Thulisiwe Ivy Mavuso
11. Meshack Mdlalose
12. Glenrose Nompumelelo Khumalo
13. Siyabulela Godfrey Solani
14. Timothy Hlengisizwe Mtshali
15. Makhosonke Sotyu
16. Obed Thembinkosi Ngcamu
17. Siphumule Ishmael Ntombela
18. Thembinkosi Mankunzini Sibiya
19. Nompumelelo Confidence Mthethwa
20. Bonginkosi Innocent Mncwabe

=== Regional ===
==== Free State ====
1. Dinkeng Martha Motaung
2. Zukiswa Elsie Maputle
3. Ntshadi Elizabeth Modupe

==== Gauteng ====
1. Sunset Bheki Xaba
2. Mlondolozi Innocent Shezi
3. Lindani Calalakhe Magwaza
4. Zilungile Princess Ngwane
5. Pholo Mokubung
6. Siyabulela Godfrey Solani
7. Malikwa Jacob Mtshweni
8. Glenrose Nompumelelo Khumalo
9. Nomthandazo Zama Mnguni
10. Elson Joseph Mahungela
11. Nokukhanyakwenkosi Nonkululeko Dhlamini

==== KwaZulu-Natal ====
1. Khulekani Rodney Hlatshwayo
2. Xolani Steven Sibiya
3. Themba Innocent Dladla
4. Qaphelani Sibusiso Dlamini
5. Nqobizitha Philangezwi Sithole
6. Christopher Vusi Mthetwa
7. Thandeka Purity Gwala
8. Nqobile Mthembu
9. Abiot Mazwi Nala
10. Lindiwe Precious Madonsela
11. Israel Sizwe Muziwandile Hadebe
12. Athini Glen Ndubelele
13. Sizwe Richard Mhlongo
14. Nobesuthu Nhlengethwa
15. Mandlonke Thuthukani Khanyile
16. Nkosingiphile Zwelithini Nene
17. Sylvester Nkanyiso Mkhize
18. Esther Zodwa Mtshali
19. Nkosinathi Muzikhona Qwabe

==== Mpumalanga ====
1. Timothy Hlengisizwe Mtshali
2. Mbongeni Alexander Manana
3. Busisiwe Prisca Hlatshwayo
4. Sokhaya Khulekani Polycarp Mthombothi
5. Thembisile Faith Manana
6. Nelisiwe Sweetness Linda
7. Ivios Nkosinomsa Shoba
8. Silungile Pretty Mthethwa
9. Mbali Maseko
10. Gabisile Ntombifikile Nkambule
11. Mthokozisi Melusi Mhlongo

=== Provincial ===
==== Free State ====
1. Vusumuzi Daniel Nqele
2. Mathoto Tryphine Motaung
3. Thabiso Andries Moseneke
4. Selaotswe John Morata
5. Ntshadi Elizabeth Modupe
6. Xoliswa Michelle Blaar

==== Gauteng ====
1. Buselaphi Irene Gxowa
2. Thulani Michael Ngiba
3. Khanyisani Minenhle Mtshali
4. Zwelabo Mthethwa
5. Cyprian Sifiso Gcabashe
6. Glenrose Nompumelelo Khumalo
7. Malikwa Jacob Mtshweni
8. Siyabulela Godfrey Solani
9. Kgotlaetsile Edward Mmereki
10. Mthandeni Zakhele Thwala
11. Jabulani Patrick Sithole
12. Gideon Celimpilo Xaba
13. Xolani Mfaniseni Ndebele

==== KwaZulu-Natal ====
1. Cynthia Mbali Shinga
2. Simphiwe Mzwandile Khumalo
3. Gregory Zithembe Ngobese
4. Nompumelelo Beauty Nkosi
5. Ngcebo Sphamandla Bukhosini
6. Keizer Muziwekhaya Dladla
7. Lindiwe Doris Khathi
8. Sibongiseni Nkululeko Nxumalo
9. Siphamandla Zakhele Myeni
10. Vuyelwa Nombulelo Geraldine Maseko
11. Lawrence Cebenza Nala
12. Mandlonke Thuthukani Khanyile
13. Kwazi Buthelezi
14. Zethukile Sikazile Xulu
15. Xolile Mkhabela
16. Slindile Rose Mavimbela
17. Thandie Regina Malinga
18. Msawenkosi Maphumulo
19. Nompumelelo Nontuthuko Mthethwa-Ntsele
20. Sihle Eugine Madlala
21. Mabekezela Vincent Siyabonga Mlaba
22. Mzwandile Kenson Dlodlo

==== Mpumalanga ====
1. Timothy Hlengisizwe Mtshali
2. Mbongeni Alexander Manana
3. Sokhaya Khulekani Polycarp Mthombothi
4. Busisiwe Prisca Hlatshwayo
5. Mthokozisi Melusi Mhlongo
6. Nelisiwe Sweetness Linda

== Pan Africanist Congress of Azania ==
=== National ===
1. **Mzwanele Nyhontso**
2. Victor Serakalala
3. Ntsiri Shadrack Pooe
4. Ramarumo Edward Mfulwane
5. Jaki Stone Seroke
6. Mbuyiselo Daniel Kantso
7. Sbusiso Fransisco Xaba
8. Azania Simthandile Tyhali
9. Samuel Jan Makgatho Motau
10. Kgosientsho Reuben Ramokgopa
11. Owen Khathazile
12. Zamikaya Nicholson Xabe
13. Allois Nicholas Dumakude
14. Sondisa Magajana
15. Zwelidumile Elliot Ntlanganiso
16. Sarah Qabukile Mlotshwa
17. Cabral Misile Stemela
18. Wilmot Vakele Mkandawire
19. Mabitsela Hezekiel Mphasha
20. Mfana'fikile Samuel Zwane
21. Sanelisiwe Dilata
22. Magezi Steven Maluleke
23. Mbulelo Raymond Fihla
24. Sandla Goqwana
25. Mtutuzeli Nyolisi Mama
26. Aphelele Buku
27. Sonwabile Khuni
28. Zandisiwe Unati Nyimbana
29. Xoliswa Memani
30. Aviwe Genev? Jordaan
31. Elaine Gallant-Matinise
32. Thobeka Thelma Dayizana
33. Rene Levona Oosthuizen
34. Nomonde Patience Tokwana
35. Gcobani Katiya
36. Phelisa Linda Msila
37. Churchman Adams
38. Neziswa Mgweba
39. Lindile Theophilus Ngetu
40. Andile Anthony Gege
41. Thabo Moses Mashau
42. Lepola Piet Mokgophi
43. Nakaphala Frans Matlala
44. Pazarell Winnie Makgeledisa Mphahlele
45. Ntina Johannes Ntsoane
46. Mashao Onismus Khasalela
47. Mohale Emmanuel Mathole
48. Isaac Mafoko
49. Masilo Simon Rachekhu
50. Phetola Frans Motheta
51. Mashudu Jane Mmboi
52. Thamsanqa Christopher Ngubo
53. Sandile Morgan Cele
54. Wiseman Nkosinathi Hlophe
55. Richman Jabulani Mhlongo
56. Ntombifuthi Jean Richmond
57. Luvuyo Bennet Hleli
58. Mohau Gashwin Kekana
59. Sabata Daniel Rasobi
60. Nthabiseng Agnes Jeanette Huis
61. Tshepiso Lebeeta
62. Tshidiso Johannes Seloane
63. Mahlomola Abel Mohale
64. Tsietsi Isaac Maphokoane
65. Ngaka Isaac Tsubella
66. Sebolai Paul Makate
67. Mzamo Junior Richard Fans
68. Neo Jacob Mokoena
69. Alice Dibuseng Makopoi
70. Bongani Bruce Ziqubu
71. Alina Ntswaki Makate
72. Lebea Paulus Potsane
73. Pitso Ernest Finger
74. Michael Pule Moabi
75. Marumo Joseph Leteane
76. Letlatsa Ishmael Chabane
77. Lindiwe Anna Nhlapo
78. Mamoroke Melita Dlamini
79. Phindwa Johannes Mgcina
80. Kokobetsa Krisjan Motsoeneng
81. Serame Richard Nevhufumba
82. Abel Malefetsane Radebe
83. Monyaba Thomas Makgae
84. Malesela Jan Mashao
85. Garwin Mogake Simon Moalusi
86. Angeline Thela
87. Tsietsi Alpheus Makunyana
88. Tebogo Pardon Nkokou
89. Samuel Radebe
90. Sello Kingsley Boloang
91. Sibusiso Mtshali
92. Molwamtwa Samuel Tshabadi
93. Zanele Emily Lengana
94. Louisa Makhosazana Ngwenya
95. Mabel Maditso Diale
96. Charles Khabi Madiba
97. Lucy Mdakane
98. Albert Ditlhake Mokoena
99. Ntebogiseng Nancy Isaacs
100. David Mandla Matlala
101. Gerald Maroweshe Lerobane
102. Sonwabo Bennedict Nxiba
103. Jimmy Khosa
104. Matsie Adelina Moekoa
105. Arthur Aduma Onke France
106. Ikey Isaacs
107. Thembinkosi Mthakathi Cedric Mahlangu
108. Andreas Mokone Rantlo
109. Thomas Ntando
110. Joseph Mohau Monaheng
111. Eseu Mbinyane Tshabalala
112. Eugent Eugene Khoza
113. Pontsho July Mamogobo
114. Motlatjo Patricia Mokonyane
115. Malesela John Boshomane
116. Tshisevhe Ndou
117. Jeffrey Sekepe Ratshoshi
118. Philemon Mamagohle Montjane
119. Mokgatlane Suzanne Phasha
120. Ntshengedzeni Eddie Mashadzha
121. Kgaogelo Mokgohlwe Mavis Makgatho
122. Lesibana John Madupela
123. Molobane Jacob Mogowane
124. Thabo Petrus Rantho
125. Isroom Maleu Makhubela
126. Isaac Mokhwiyi Rakgoale
127. Edzisani Madzunya
128. Mashau Glory Zhalagome
129. Khathutshelo Elgine Ligege
130. Nthangeni Signey Magadze
131. Gabriel Azwindini Nenguda
132. Zodwa Queen Miyambo
133. Nyambeni Monica Raphalalani
134. Matodzi Phineas Murwamphiya
135. Dikeledi Portia Langa
136. Motlanalo George Rataba
137. Keshoketsoe Mmatsatsi Kgaabi
138. Marshall Mashaha Ramokgopa
139. Roseline Shila Tshidi
140. Queen Josephina Lekalakala
141. Ramadimetja Brendah Lebelo
142. Matsobane William Ratisani
143. Madimetja Johannes Boshomane
144. Oupa Aubrey Langa
145. Sono Louis Nkawana
146. Nelisa Seti
147. Nyangisizwe Xolile Mfaxa
148. Siphiwe Thomas Nyaka
149. Lwazi Verne Hodges Ndlovu
150. Nqobile Princess Shongwe
151. Zacharia Bongani Zungu
152. Emmanuel Jabulani Zwane
153. Cedric Vuyani Mzelemu
154. Makono Ismael Mmakola
155. Dollence Hlamalani Nukeri
156. Benjamin Phakamani Ntentema
157. Miselo Constance Ntshingila
158. Mookho Gladys Mokonyana
159. Nomadzima Salamina Mnguni
160. Thandiwe Patricia Mira
161. Mamorena Johanna Lefisa
162. Mhlonipheni Francis Dlamini
163. Mzimkhulu Archibald Funani
164. Michael Thabo Genu
165. Agnes Lungile Gubuza
166. Thabiso Kolanisi
167. Samuel Paseka Kutoane
168. Moeketsi Michael Makiri
169. Nditsheni Piet Maphala
170. Macheconia Mochologi
171. Lucas Jerios Mmola
172. Simon Mandla Jele
173. Bafana Sydwell Ziggy Simelane
174. Tandzile Mandisa Masilela
175. Patrick Vosho Lubisi
176. Rodney Phumulani Mnisi
177. Sheila Sandra Sibuyi
178. Siyabonga Percival Ndashe
179. Mfundo Shabangu
180. Henny Ndlovu
181. Karabo Marvel Maile
182. Maurice Janji Khoza
183. Noncedo Simelane
184. Lucky Nkuna
185. Bernard Matthews
186. Yvonne Bernadtte Mosegeleng
187. Nelisa Spolo
188. Thelo Shadrack Paulus
189. Johannes Kagisho Daniels
190. Cassiem Dawood Khan
191. Thembisile Mbenene
192. Sindile Gravel
193. Vuyani Charlie
194. Koleka Mtinta
195. Vuyolwethu Zenolia Gwama
196. Mojalefa Milford Mogotsi
197. Petrus Wilson
198. Godisamang Aaron Moepetsane
199. Obakeng Godfrey Baepi
200. Phenyo Thapedi Mc Donald Kwanaite

== Patriotic Alliance ==
=== National ===
1. Gayton McKenzie
2. Ashley Sauls
3. Filicity Susan Rorke
4. Cleo Wilskut
5. Stacey-Lee Gaby Khojane
6. Manene Tabane
7. Derick Petersen
8. Raymont Ismael Steenkamp
9. Ewan Botha
10. Mervan Freddie Ambraal
11. Liesl Benise Penniken
12. Yvonne Venessa Pretorius
13. Chazlon Keanan Warries
14. Raynaldo Nirissa Francis
15. Jodi Nolan Petersen
16. Logan Quinton Fortuin
17. Ernest Hendricks
18. Myrtle Charmaine Williams
19. Griffiths Bosaletse
20. Lemarco Marcelle Mitchell
21. Brandon Thomas Jacobs
22. Francois Mafuto
23. Lloyd Garth Saile
24. Ferguson Morris Moses
25. Lizonia Yolene Lawack
26. Rayleen Rochelle Smit
27. Jacqueline Geraldine Muggels
28. Ryan Clifton Swarts
29. Belinda Elizabeth Voorby
30. Meredith Tracy-Lee Bowkers
31. Mertle Brenda Ruiter
32. Steven Ogle
33. Dani?L Rendolph Claasen
34. Leovaljo Josephine Simpson
35. Marvin Dean Clarke
36. Sebastian Hilary De Villiers
37. Tazmon Lynette Kock
38. Mitchell John Smith
39. Lizell Whitehead
40. Saintes Harry Mclove Van Wyk
41. Nuraan Adams
42. Chade Lyle Kramer
43. Beverley Charmaine Groves
44. Harold Simon Kopano Malinga
45. Nadine Cecile Murray
46. Lucas Lehlohonolo Lekhalo
47. Jack Dolphie Johnston
48. Jo-Anne Happiness Pitso
49. Kyra Allison-Kelly Von Luiters
50. Natascha Sid-Branian Susan Arison
51. Ismael Geffin Siljeur
52. Wayne Abé Robertson
53. Farrally Jacobus Everson
54. Adam Antoney Pietersen

== Rise Mzansi ==
=== National ===
1. Songezo Siphiwo Zibi
2. Vuyiswa Reitumetse Magdaline Ramokgopa
3. Mandlesizwe Lionel Brian Isaacs
4. Nomsa Innocencia Tarabella Marchesi
5. Stanford Makashule Gana
6. Louise Van Rhyn
7. Nkhumeni Ramulifho
8. Busisiwe Nkosi
9. Tebogo Moalusi
10. Erika Bornman
11. Michael Stephen Shackleton
12. Lesego Emmah Holele
13. Moyowabo David Kabwa
14. Faeeza Lok
15. Moshinini Lawrence Manaka
16. Nkele Molapo
17. Jitendrakumar Maganlal Hargovan
18. Koliwe Jacqueline Magangana
19. Sivuyile Olwethu Mhaga
20. Kagiso Cacia Segage
21. Bongathini Peter-Paul Mbele
22. Fundiswa Ndlela
23. Mabine Seabe
24. Thamsanqa Clyde Masingi
25. Mokgadi Kganakga
26. Kabelo Petrus Thobejane
27. Wafeekah Begg-Jassiem
28. Katlego Moeketsi
29. Thokozile Eulanda Nhlumayo
30. Shakespear Thulasizwe Baleni
31. Nompumelelo Nobiva
32. Thembelani Lawrence Mashalaba
33. Dimpho Nonhlanhla Lekgeu
34. Nomayeza Ida Bagamela
35. Sandile Joyisile Mjamba
36. Malik Dasoo
37. Mothusiotsile Alfred Moagi
38. Mziwoxolo Israel Christopher Maxon
39. Thembinkosi Elliot Henna
40. Yusuf Ismail
41. Moeketsane Hopwell Wiseman Bennie
42. Zandisile Mabuya
43. Mlungisi Jack Msibi
44. Tobela Tapula
45. Paul Maja
46. Moses Nhlanhla Ntimane
47. Lazola Belle
48. Mashumi Sydwell Tutu
49. Hepworth Xolisile Mbada
50. Lwandile Mthunzi Langeni-Mzizi
51. Mitchell Ron Black
52. Ricardo Fernando Teixeira
53. Mbhazima Peter Makhubele
54. Craig Kevin Allan Butters
55. Grant Fyfe Jardine
56. Phethani Madzivhandila
57. Ntsaphokazi Madyibi
58. Bilqees Akoodie
59. Simon Mosotho Motau
60. Nhlanhla Jili
61. Kgomotso Rose Molewa
62. Rashaad Carlsen
63. Pogiso Martin Kgobokoe
64. Zanoxolo Mciteka
65. Tonakgolo Kgosi Shekinah Seabe
66. Mokgale Tiisetso Maloma
67. Anele Ndlovu
68. Pumla Faith Ngesi
69. Cebo Mntwini
70. Bongile Venfolo
71. Khawulani Ebenezer Zwane
72. Thozama Portia Mpikeleli
73. Mahlatse Mathabathe
74. Gladnes Patricia Mashale
75. Nomzekelo Jacqueline Jama
76. Oupa Joseph Mathibela
77. Tau Gladwin Sello
78. Vukile Tony Mathews Welskit
79. Titiba Winterton Yanta
80. Norman Botha
81. Choene Peter Tlouane
82. Zelda Jane Monametsi
83. Ronnie Ramakgabane More
84. Advocate Lindile Mhlana
85. Mongezi Ashley Wondo
86. Oratile Aubrey Morwenyane
87. Dorothea Kgomotso Maphiri Mabunda
88. Fhatuwani Muswobi
89. Khungile Goodwell Hobongwana
90. Matlakala Adeleen Phungula
91. Thelo Stephen Botlhoko
92. Moroape Sebesho
93. Tobias Johannes Mokwena
94. Abel Lefu Hanong
95. Refiloe Winnie Hanong
96. Thato Manaswe
97. Masego Kopano Hammer
98. Tshepo Theo Hokoane
99. France Chicco Novela
100. Munyadziwa Kenneth Muleya
101. Tshepiso Mafika
102. Sandile Taylor Tshaka
103. Khanyisile Nomvula Mlambo
104. Dimakatso John Manthosi
105. Safiya Haffejee
106. Resego Bontle Seokane
107. Charl Unathi Mblangwe
108. Siphokazi Nelisa Chula
109. Lukhanyo Ncana
110. Preetika Ajoodha
111. Patricia Lerato Mahoyi
112. Thuso Mphahleni
113. Sindiswa Ngqwemla
114. Gaopalelwe Olivia Phalaetsile
115. Theodosia Nokukhanya Motha
116. Lebone Nonofo Seleho
117. Sithembile Ellen Mlangeni
118. Camilla Noluthando Mhlambi
119. Ona Matshaya
120. Tholakele Mngomezulu
121. Matlali Mirriam Thipa
122. Pelokazi Purity Tezapi
123. Sipho Mawelela
124. Tshiamo Zebediela
125. Andries Botsang Mogati
126. Dikeledi Berlina Maboe
127. Bertha Baratamang Monkwe
128. Itumeleng Cyprian Sebe
129. Lebogang Kagiso
130. Mamosa Lydia Jasson
131. Xoliswa Queenoria Mgabi
132. Molelekeng Sanah Marumo
133. Maleshane Mother Gaoraelwe
134. Moemedi Koloi
135. Thomas Kenny Modise
136. Mogorwe Rebecca Lephogole
137. Amogelang Lucretia Dingoko
138. Thamaga Elvis Mphela
139. Tumelo Johannes Masilo
140. Mosetlane Sharon Batlhaping
141. Baster Bvuma
142. Lehlohonolo Lawrence Mohlaka
143. Rofhiwa Viora Makwarela
144. Lihle Nyikana
145. Bohlale Buzani
146. Bandile Besuthu Gqwetha
147. Allison Mariska Schoeman
148. Lerato Innocentia Baloyi
149. Olga Pauline Maku
150. Tracey Lee Miller
151. Vhahangwele Tsotetsi
152. Siham Survé
153. Nonkululeko Mbalu
154. Neshan Dinat
155. Disebo Seipei Shole
156. Benedict Malefetsane Mphukhe
157. Petronella Nomalizo Madikatso Manzana
158. Sfiso Melusi Sibanyoni
159. Lebohang Segomotso Morakabi
160. Moferefere Ralengau
161. Nthabeleng Ernestina Matlhoko
162. Clayton Oriel Wadrif
163. Palesa Florence Monaheng
164. Mamohau Alinah Baza
165. William Bolt
166. Teboho Vincent Tumane
167. Xoliswa Izet Maxakato
168. Mosa Pitso Johannes Mokose
169. Motsamai James Tshabalala
170. Moleboheng Mathafeng
171. Thabo Ephraim Tsolo
172. Pule Mmutsi
173. Nthatisi Maria Sefuthi
174. Puleng Choice Makhele
175. Moshe Molelle
176. Enice Dieketseng Mokubung
177. Everite Thabiso Leoatle
178. Mankofi Julia Ramochela
179. Thembekile Jacqueline Rantoetse
180. Dimakatso Nyenzane
181. Mohlouwane Elizabeth Mosueunyane
182. Tshepo Jane Maleme
183. Lerato Varnessa Mofokeng
184. Lefu Patrick Sefuli
185. Mathabo Emily Radebe
186. Ntala David Mokhampanyane
187. Mboshwa Policeman Kubheka
188. Karabo David Mokoena
189. Mmamelamu Josephine Pitso
190. Emily Mankgakile Hassan
191. Tshokolo Andries Lesane
192. Lentjie Van Wyk
193. Mahlomola Jonathan Motloung
194. Nosiviwe Dolly Magumasholo
195. Ayanda Vasini
196. Mzwamadoda Nicolas Booi
197. Zine Joan Mbuba
198. Mpumelelo Naught Wetu
199. Tshinakaho Helen Silimela

=== Regional ===
==== Eastern Cape ====
1. Fundiswa Ndlela
2. Thembelani Lawrence Mashalaba
3. Koliwe Jacqueline Magangana
4. Sandile Joyisile Mjamba
5. Pumla Faith Ngesi
6. Zandisile Mabuya
7. Nomzekelo Jacqueline Jama
8. Bongile Venfolo
9. Vukile Tony Mathews Welskit
10. Titiba Winterton Yanta
11. Norman Botha
12. Khungile Goodwell Hobongwana
13. Nosiviwe Dolly Magumasholo
14. Ayanda Vasini
15. Mzwamadoda Nicolas Booi
16. Zine Joan Mbuba
17. Sonwabisi Jonas
18. Florence Nompumelelo Mnyakama
19. Mpumelelo Naught Wetu
20. Chanrique Shyanne Roskruge
21. Baby Obuhle Sihu
22. Zimkhita Dickmolo
23. Sinethemba Blaau
24. Zanele Kwetana
25. Bandile Nelson Nohayi

==== Free State ====
1. Mokgadi Kganakga
2. Nomayeza Ida Bagamela
3. Thozama Portia Mpikeleli
4. Gladnes Patricia Mashale
5. Tshepo Theo Hokoane
6. Thabo Ephraim Tsolo
7. Pule Mmutsi
8. Nthatisi Maria Sefuthi
9. Puleng Choice Makhele
10. Moshe Molelle

==== Gauteng ====
1. Stanford Makashule Gana
2. Faeeza Lok
3. Moyowabo David Kabwa
4. Nkele Molapo
5. Nkhumeni Ramulifho
6. Kagiso Cacia Segage
7. Tebogo Moalusi
8. Thokozile Eulanda Nhlumayo
9. Michael Stephen Shackleton
10. Nompumelelo Nobiva
11. Jitendrakumar Maganlal Hargovan
12. Dimpho Nonhlanhla Lekgeu
13. Sivuyile Olwethu Mhaga
14. Mabine Seabe
15. Ntsaphokazi Madyibi
16. Kabelo Petrus Thobejane
17. Bilqees Akoodie
18. Katlego Moeketsi
19. Kgomotso Rose Molewa
20. Thamsanqa Clyde Masingi
21. Zelda Jane Monametsi
22. Moshinini Lawrence Manaka
23. Dorothea Kgomotso Maphiri Mabunda
24. Irfaan Mangera
25. Matlakala Adeleen Phungula
26. Malik Dasoo
27. Refiloe Winnie Hanong
28. Thembinkosi Elliot Henna
29. Yusuf Ismail
30. Mlungisi Jack Msibi
31. Tobela Tapula
32. Paul Maja
33. Lazola Belle
34. Hepworth Xolisile Mbada
35. Mitchell Ron Black
36. Ricardo Fernando Teixeira
37. Mbhazima Peter Makhubele
38. Simon Mosotho Motau
39. Zanoxolo Mciteka
40. Pogiso Martin Kgobokoe
41. Mokgale Tiisetso Maloma
42. Cebo Mntwini
43. Mahlatse Mathabathe
44. Tau Gladwin Sello
45. Ronnie Ramakgabane More
46. Advocate Lindile Mhlana

==== KwaZulu-Natal ====
1. Bongathini Peter‐Paul Mbele
2. Busisiwe Nkosi
3. Shakespear Thulasizwe Baleni
4. Nonkululeko Portia Hlongwane‐Mhlongo
5. Mziwoxolo Israel Christopher Maxon
6. Anele Ndlovu
7. Moeketsane Hopwell Wiseman Bennie
8. Lwandile Mthunzi Langeni‐Mzizi
9. Nhlanhla Jili
10. Shawn Sidney Smith
11. Raymond Thabani Kalala
12. Busiswa Mkizwana

==== Limpopo ====
1. Phethani Madzivhandila
2. Baster Bvuma
3. Musa Justice Nkuna
4. Moroape Sebesho
5. Tobias Johannes Mokwena
6. Rofhiwa Viora Makwarela
7. Tshinakaho Helen Silimela
8. Donald Tinyiko Shilenge
9. Elvis Seadingwe Ratau
10. Kanetani Philemon Maluleke
11. Tshenolo Norah Mphahlele
12. Matlou Lucy Mabitsela

==== Mpumalanga ====
1. Chantell Marlen Robson
2. Moses Nhlanhla Ntimane
3. Khawulani Ebenezer Zwane
4. France Chicco Novela
5. Lauretta Brenda Mamaila
6. Sifiso Jones Mnyambo
7. Happiness Sally Masinga
8. Eutricia Nomvuyo Ntandane
9. Lindokuhle Patricia Nkosi
10. Masesi Ndabezitha
11. Penuel Mkhatshwa

==== North West ====
1. Lesego Emmah Holele
2. Tonakgolo Kgosi Shekinah Seabe
3. Mothusiotsile Alfred Moagi
4. Oupa Joseph Mathibela
5. Choene Peter Tlouane
6. Thelo Stephen Botlhoko

==== Northern Cape ====
1. Dwaine Roystene Fish
2. Kgakgamatso Motebe
3. Disebo Seipei Shole
4. Masego Kopano Hammer
5. Petronella Nomalizo Madikatso Manzana

==== Western Cape ====
1. Louise Van Rhyn
2. Mashumi Sydwell Tutu
3. Erika Bornman
4. Craig Kevin Allan Butters
5. Wafeekah Begg‐Jassiem
6. Grant Fyfe Jardine
7. Fhatuwani Muswobi
8. Rashaad Carlsen
9. Oratile Aubrey Morwenyane
10. Siphokazi Cebo
11. Noluthando Yukutwana
12. Craig Samuel Michael Marthinus
13. Lungelo Jonas

=== Provincial ===
==== Eastern Cape ====
1. Thembelani Lawrence Mashalaba
2. Luxolo Ntuthuzelo Billie
3. Sandile Joyisile Mjamba
4. Koliwe Jacqueline Magangana
5. Mbuzeli Nkwali
6. Nosiviwe Dolly Magumasholo
7. Ayanda Vasini
8. Mzwamadoda Nicolas Booi
9. Zine Joan Mbuba
10. Sonwabisi Jonas
11. Florence Nompumelelo Mnyakama
12. Mpumelelo Naught Wetu
13. Chanrique Shyanne Roskruge
14. Baby Obuhle Sihu
15. Zimkhita Dickmolo
16. Sinethemba Blaau
17. Zanele Kwetana
18. Bandile Nelson Nohayi
19. Siyabonga Jayiya
20. Siyasanga Lyric Nqeketho
21. Lindeka Victoria Magumasholo
22. Sinazo Maseti

==== Fress State ====
1. Nomsa Innocencia Tarabella Marchesi
2. Tshidiso Kenneth Koena
3. Mokgadi Kganakga
4. Motseki Ezekiel Motlatla
5. Nomayeza Ida Bagamela
6. Debi Mmasabata Seriti Moagi
7. Thozama Portia Mpikeleli
8. Gladnes Patricia Mashale
9. Lamla Greatitude Shasha
10. Thabo Ephraim Tsolo
11. Pule Mmutsi
12. Nthatisi Maria Sefuthi
13. Puleng Choice Makhele
14. Moshe Molelle
15. Molelekeng Agnes Bagamela
16. Samuel Bagamela Bagamela
17. Machogo Mokete Lekgebotsane
18. Dimakatso Maria Masokoane
19. Thandi Engeline Ntuli
20. Nomsa Unice Mzamo
21. Lerato Getrude Pelesa
22. Maloase Jermina Rasheleng
23. Dimakatso Nyenzane
24. Mohlouwane Elizabeth Mosueunyane
25. Tshepo Jane Maleme
26. Lerato Varnessa Mofokeng
27. Lefu Patrick Sefuli
28. Mathabo Emily Radebe
29. Karabo David Mokoena
30. Mamotseko Felicia Sebiloane

==== Gauteng ====
1. Vuyiswa Reitumetse Magdaline Ramokgopa
2. Tebogo Moalusi
3. Tsakane Esther Padi
4. Irfaan Mangera
5. Judith Nonelwa Zaziswa Mtsewu
6. Nkhumeni Ramulifho
7. Shannon Leslie Arnold
8. Faeeza Lok
9. Kabelo Petrus Thobejane
10. Kagiso Cacia Segage
11. Katlego Moeketsi
12. Dimpho Nonhlanhla Lekgeu
13. Moshinini Lawrence Manaka
14. Malik Dasoo
15. Ntsaphokazi Madyibi
16. Thembinkosi Elliot Henna
17. Bilqees Akoodie
18. Yusuf Ismail
19. Nalene Pillay
20. Mlungisi Jack Msibi
21. Zelda Jane Monametsi
22. Tobela Tapula
23. Mamanyanye Edna Sifuthe
24. Vusi Edwin Jele
25. Zarina Loonat
26. Lazola Belle
27. Fredah Malerato Modiselle
28. Kamogelo Thomas Themba
29. Mitchell Ron Black
30. Refiloe Winnie Hanong
31. Makhwenkwe Abram Dombo
32. Vusumuzi Mthimkulu
33. Lesetja Lubabalo Mpho Maraba
34. Lunghile Sithole
35. Ahmed Patel
36. Tau Gladwin Sello
37. Ignatius Daniel Hopewell Adams
38. Mongezi Ashley Wondo
39. Kgomotso Victor Mokgara
40. Isaac Motloung
41. Suleiman Abdulhuck Patel

==== KwaZulu-Natal ====
1. Nonkululeko Portia Hlongwane-Mhlongo
2. Mziwoxolo Israel Christopher Maxon
3. Anele Ndlovu
4. Shakespear Thulasizwe Baleni
5. Shawn Sidney Smith
6. Raymond Thabani Kalala
7. Busisiwe Nkosi
8. Ntozinhle Sinqobile Victress Nkomo
9. Allison Mariska Schoeman
10. Sphindile Penelope Xulu
11. Minenhle Wordsworth Mshengu
12. Wonderboy Sthenjwa Mnyandu
13. Nelisiwe Buthelezi
14. Mfanafuthi Goodman Shange
15. Ntokozo Princess Cele
16. Phumzile Hlophe
17. Mtukayise Ndunge Mngoma
18. Thamsanqa Michael Mathonsi
19. Lufuno Shezi
20. Amanda Nokwanda Ndebele
21. Thabile Happiness Ngceni
22. Lindelani Beuckes Cele
23. Samkelisiwe Fortunate Makhanya
24. Philile Parcy Nsele
25. Nkosikhona Thokozani Mbatha
26. Mduduzi Nhlumayo
27. Thobile Carin Nxumalo
28. Xolisile Sikhosana
29. Pinkie Nontobeko Buthelezi
30. Busiswa Mkizwana

==== Limpopo ====
1. Rofhiwa Viora Makwarela
2. Ellias Zolani Simayi
3. Phethani Madzivhandila
4. Makakane Ronald Mautla
5. Baster Bvuma
6. Musa Justice Nkuna
7. Tshinakaho Helen Silimela
8. Elvis Seadingwe Ratau
9. Kanetani Philemon Maluleke
10. Matlou Lucy Mabitsela
11. Donald Tinyiko Shilenge

==== Mpumalanga ====
1. Moses Nhlanhla Ntimane
2. Chantell Marlen Robson
3. Khawulani Ebenezer Zwane
4. Nkosinathi Penwell Gumede
5. Selby Vusumuzi Khumalo

==== North-West ====
1. Mothusiotsile Alfred Moagi
2. Lerato Rebecca Molale
3. Kagiso Josiah Monyadiwa
4. Tonakgolo Kgosi Shekinah Seabe
5. Moiloa Joseph Tiro
6. Olebogeng Semenekane
7. Tshiamo Zebediela
8. Andries Botsang Mogati
9. Dikeledi Berlina Maboe
10. Bertha Baratamang Monkwe
11. Itumeleng Cyprian Sebe
12. Lebogang Kagiso
13. Mamosa Lydia Jasson
14. Xoliswa Queenoria Mgabi
15. Molelekeng Sanah Marumo
16. Maleshane Mother Gaoraelwe
17. Moemedi Koloi
18. Thomas Kenny Modise
19. Mogorwe Rebecca Lephogole
20. Amogelang Lucretia Dingoko
21. Tumelo Johannes Masilo
22. Mosetlane Sharon Batlhaping

==== Northern Cape ====
1. Thabiso Mogorosi
2. Kgakgamatso Motebe
3. Mpho Peter Moipolai
4. Petronella Nomalizo Madikatso Manzana
5. Terence Olebogeng Modise
6. Dwaine Roystene Fish
7. Hlumisa Nkuzo
8. Eileen Gana
9. Jimmy Patrick Loff
10. Wilfred Letlhogonolo Mapatsi
11. Nzaliseko Soyisele Fuso
12. Ruzelle Goboditsemang Lekgobo
13. Modiakgotla Samuel Lesego Mafokoane
14. Naomi Mamello Matsoso
15. Noluthando Van Wyk
16. Lerato Iris Lemena
17. Modise Jogome
18. Ofentse Quinton Vorster
19. Confidence Dipuo Vorster
20. Megan Nomqondiso Mayekiso

==== Western Cape ====
1. Axolile Notywala
2. Latiefa Dirkse
3. Isa-Lee Tania Jacobson
4. Hilton-Lesley Anthony
5. Erika Bornman
6. Waheed Arend
7. Grant Fyfe Jardine
8. Rashaad Carlsen
9. Ladovica Michele Gordon
10. Thembela Miriam Tetani
11. Howard Jerome Williams
12. Siham Survé
13. Lungelo Jonas
14. Nkosimntu Kosi
15. Jerome David Daniels
16. Noluthando Yukutwana
17. Siphokazi Cebo
18. Craig Samuel Michael Marthinus

== uMkhonto we Sizwe ==
uMkhonto we Sizwe (MK) included former president Jacob Zuma at the top of its list. The IEC received objections to his eligibility, based on Section 47 of the Constitution, which stipulated that one cannot be elected to Parliament if sentenced to more than twelve months in prison, and five years has not passed since the sentence. Zuma was sentenced to fifteen months in prison in 2021. The IEC ruled that Zuma was not eligible to stand. However, the Electoral Court overturned this decision, before the Constitutional Court finally affirmed it, prohibiting Zuma from standing.

=== National ===
1. Jacob Gedleyihlekisa Zuma
2. Jabulani Sibongiseni Khumalo
3. Sophonia Tsekedi
4. Lebogang Moepeng
5. Goodwill Kgatle
6. Mashudu Ashley Tshivhase
7. Khethiso Meshack Tebe
8. Rochelle Clodette Davidson
9. Visvin Gopal Reddy
10. Joel Sihle Ngubane
11. Augastina Madala Qwetha
12. David Douglas Des Van Rooyen
13. Morongwe Mary Phadi
14. Moses Sipho Mbatha
15. David Mandla Skosana
16. Mandlenkosi James Matutu
17. Zwelakhe Elija Mthethwa
18. Duduzile Zuma-Sambudla
19. Musawenkosi Mhlabuhlangene Gasa
20. Sibusiso Dumisani Nyathi
21. Isaac Galeboe Menyatso
22. Hazel Htombenhle Mbele
23. Moshome Patrick Motubatse
24. France Bongani Mfiki
25. Nhlamulo Ndhlela
26. Mabel Rweqana
27. Nhlanhla Bernard Gcwabaza
28. Hlumela Monsi Shembe
29. Shunmugam Ramsamy Moodley
30. Nomado Grace Mgwebi
31. Garatwe Agnes Mogotsi
32. Citron Mpho Motshegoe
33. Crossby Vusi Shongwe
34. Edward Mzikayise Ntshingila
35. Thembinkosi Siboniso Mjadu
36. Senzo Selby Dlamini
37. Mzonke Tomsana
38. Lungisani Graduate Shangase
39. Lungile Alfred David
40. Cleopatra Tunyiswa
41. Glen Taaibosch
42. Wesley Marshall Douglas
43. Njabulo Roy Ndlovu
44. Reginald Vusimuzi Dube
45. Meshack Sipho Skhosana
46. Moses Tshepo Mahlangu
47. Mabula Daniel Nhlapo
48. Phanuel Mvula Manana
49. Given Sibusiso Khumalo
50. Angel Tidimalo Thabethe
51. Zinhle Sannah Nhlapho
52. Norman Sello Mogapi
53. Mmela Frederick Mahlangu
54. Isa Dumisane Mlambo
55. Cristine Mathibela
56. Lucky Mkansi
57. Nelson Wisane Tivane
58. Gift Motaung
59. Philasande Mkhize
60. Kgaboetsile Israel Modisaotsile
61. Matshwenyego Godfrey Jaabosigo
62. Mothusimang Jonas Mokoto
63. Modisaotsile Peter Ramodise
64. Thembeka Miner Ngcobo
65. Pule Patrick Kutwane
66. Lerato Emly Lekabe
67. Mantwa Caroline Mosiamo-Makoti
68. Richard Christopher Malikane
69. Feroza Ferrier
70. Anastasia Antoinette Jacobs
71. Ntombenhle Prudence Ngubane
72. Peter Sifiso Hadebe
73. Nokuthula Petunia Mdlalose
74. Prince Mulaudzi
75. Grace Manganye
76. Given Thulani Mogola
77. Mokgalabane Eric Ronaldo Mahlangu
78. Lutendo Maisha
79. Thomas Lebandla Mabena
80. Nicholous Pro Khoza
81. Sizwe Frank Fakude
82. Mandisa Treasure Thabede
83. Alfred Landwa Skhosana
84. Nombuso Mabaso
85. Lebohang Alicia Dhlamini
86. Mzwandile Joel Mkhatshwa
87. Nhlahla Mlamuli Mbuyazi
88. Landiwe Yolanda Mthimunye
89. Themba Lucky Madonsela
90. Claudia Busisiwe Mahlangu
91. Ncamiso Sanele Masina
92. Philani Petros Nyandeni
93. Domnic Xzibit Mathabela
94. Delisile Melka Hadebe
95. Happy Zakhele Mdhluli
96. Sandra Lwazi Mhlongo
97. Mike Mhlupheki Ngobeni
98. Ngedlane Dumsani George Ngomane
99. Stanley Dumisani Mahlangu
100. Peter Gambani Mabena
101. Themba Lucas Mgiba
102. Tsietsi Stephen Johanne
103. Thembi Virginia Ndlovu
104. Elsie Nomakhosazana Mbunjane
105. Zanele Pricilla Lwana
106. Thandiswa Yaphi
107. Sibonelo Nomvalo
108. Thokozane Andrew Nene
109. Emerald Kwenzokuhle Madlala
110. Phasumuzi Cosmos Mpanza
111. Sanele Kwazi Nkosikhona Khambule
112. Goodness Thembelihle Gama
113. Thokozani Skhumbuzo Marcia Zulu
114. Vusi Mduduzi Motha
115. Vusi Gabriel Yende
116. Sibusiso Andrew Dlamini
117. Pumlani Kubukeli
118. Hamilton Motaung
119. Jabulani Ernest Nkosi
120. Sonwabile Giqwa
121. Peter Siphesihle Velaphi Ngwenya
122. Lungelo Innocent Ngubane
123. Thamsanqa Fortune Khuzwayo
124. Jan Jabulani Mahlangu
125. Mzi Abednieco Mdunge
126. Boitshoko Moncho
127. Donavon Vivian Meyer
128. Sivuyile Raymond Mantyi
129. Mpumelelo Mhlomi
130. Lawrence Mkwanazi
131. Otsile Gregory Selao
132. Onalenna Precious Matilo
133. Mieta Mietjie Slinger
134. Tebogo Henry Mazambi
135. Henri?Tte Andreas
136. Simon Fumanekile Booi
137. Faizel Moosa
138. Moosa Joshua Mohlala
139. Mavis Wendy Hlazo
140. Kumari Marinus
141. Mhlawakhe Gana
142. Mzwandile Simon Biko
143. Ncedisa Mpemnyama
144. Thembekile Richard Majola
145. Benjamin James Marsala
146. Mizuvukile Samuel Sompeta
147. Nokuzola Thelma Simayile
148. Tlotliso Fose
149. Dumsani Nicholas Nhlapo
150. Zukiswa Lucia Frans
151. Mthetheli Zephaniah Mncube
152. Jabulane Ritzy Nhlanhla
153. Godfrey Nkhasi
154. Siyabonga Booysen
155. Cebolenkosi Bandile Dlodlo
156. Pearl Phunyezwa Sonqishe
157. Simanga Khanyile
158. Abraham Boy Nel
159. Siphesihle Honey De Bruin
160. Sicelo Calvin Herman Sulani
161. Bonisiwe Nothile Premrose Mbuyazi
162. Madodandile Xabadiya
163. Bongumusa Anthony Mkhize
164. Thabisile Mildred Xaba
165. Thulani Innocent Gamede
166. Kwenele Thembelihle Ntshaba
167. Nkosinathi Innocent Nxumalo
168. Mfanufikile Derrick Qwabe
169. Japhta Sihle Malinga
170. Nompumelelo Matildah Gasa
171. Marcus Sifiso Zungu
172. Thabane Jacques Luthuli
173. Nokulunga Perceviarance Khumalo
174. Therol Ndzwe Khumalo
175. Lloyd Phumlani Mfeka
176. Delisile Ntshaba
177. Shane Govender
178. Nhlakanipho Khulezweni Maphumulo
179. Trishendren Chetty
180. Linda Penwell Mabida
181. Zandile Princess Makanya
182. Mawaka Lottain Mayana
183. Khulekani Mjadu
184. Mzulungile Professor Mayana
185. Blessing Thobani Mnguni
186. Zamathembu Nokuthula Ngcobo
187. Mpho Elizabeth Ngwenya
188. Thandeka Precious Msweli
189. Innocencia Shozi
190. Jeffrey Bhekumndeni Mtolo
191. Thulasizwe Protas Mkhize
192. Beryl Ntombifuthi Mbona
193. Thamsanqa Aubrey Mkhize
194. Irvin Serame Mogale
195. Muziwokuthula Phumlani Mthembu
196. Simphiwe Muziwenkosi Mpungose
197. Simphiwe Muziwenhlanhla Gazu
198. Senzo Richard Xolo
199. Makhosonke Mlungisi Mthiyane
200. Andile Cyril Khanyile

=== Provincial ===
==== Eastern Cape ====
1. Sive Feni
2. Wandile Patrick Ngcobo
3. Bayanda Mantiane
4. Themba Wele
5. Sifiso Wonderboy Mbadu
6. Teboho Letolo
7. Yolokazi Yvonne Mndende
8. Nomonde Pretty Joja
9. Bulelwa Beatrice Jack
10. Watchman Mohato Mokatsoane
11. Paile Josias Molefe
12. Akhona Zanyiwe Xinwa
13. Malvern Pretorius
14. Nandipha Vuyolwethu Dinginto
15. Mxolisi Mafongosi
16. Nomzuzu Gladys Mgijima
17. Dingaan Jacob Myolwa
18. Simphiwe Sipika
19. Zandile Gladys Mabala
20. Nokulunga Sihoyiya
21. Nombutho Mdletye
22. Masixole Mashelele
23. Nozizwe Dorothy Otola
24. Luleka Ethel Simon-Ndzele
25. Andiswa Andrea Fikela
26. Akhona Cordelia Mahlabela
27. Mandiseni Wanda Langa
28. Simamkele Mpongoma
29. Simamkele Mpongoma
30. Nontle Mabala
31. Yongama Gcina Ndzuzo
32. Zanoxolo Gcadinja
33. Yonela Mlindazwe
34. Lulama Mvunyiswa
35. Thulisile Faith Mbotho
36. Ntombizine Mfundisi
37. Ntombizine Mfundisi
38. Bhekisisa Sandile Mginqi
39. Nomakhosazana Victoria Stuurman
40. Christine Williams
41. Bulelani Tyhali
42. Tembinkosi Ndude
43. Bongo Ngxabani
44. Zanele Calestine Jiya
45. Aggrippa Mfaniseni Mkhwanazi
46. Nkosiyoxolo Jojo
47. Lizo Jim
48. Xolani Mgxoteni
49. Dumsani Sihele
50. Zukisani Mabhanti
51. Zukisa Frankie Mseleni
52. Anda Godongwana
53. Makhetha Nicholas Moerane
54. Zanele Nozuko Twabu
55. Msa Madiba
56. Sive Fikela
57. Mandlenkosi Emmanuel Shezi
58. Nonzwakazi Dinkie Mzamo
59. Isaac Myalezwa Sabuka
60. Siyabonga Sodladla
61. Pumlani Kubukeli
62. Andiswa Nika
63. Michael Masonwabe Peter
64. Babalwa Gloria Nkosiyane
65. Sihle Moya
66. Ranaldo Paul Meyer
67. Zwelihle Moya
68. Nomakaya Ntozini
69. Shumikazi Mary-Jane Makeng-Mzozoyana
70. Zinzie Zamahlubi Xaba
71. Funeka Yalwa
72. Imamile Aubin Pikinini

==== Free State ====
1. Molefi Johannes Foko
2. Mavis Mantwa Caka
3. Mpho Lillian Valashiya
4. Malefetsane Godfrey Selebeli
5. Jwalane Paulinah Takalo
6. Mmatladi Elizabeth Checha
7. Thitoane Paul Mokhele
8. Rakokodi Joseph Motloung
9. Never Oziel Mokwena
10. Kunatu Stephen Koalane
11. Ditaba Daniel Mahoko
12. Motsamai Abel Sekole
13. Motseoile Jacob Motseoile
14. Lebeko John Maile
15. Zamikhaya Zityebile
16. Thabo Salmon Makhalanyane
17. Solomon Leponesa Mofokeng
18. Mathibela Maseko
19. Tshidiso Mokonenyana
20. Tsoanelo Boyd Mohale
21. Nelly Dada Saohatse
22. Simon Modise
23. Nozenza Betty Cezula
24. Nelly Ntombikayise Mangxaba
25. Lerato Lucky Chabeli
26. Tohlang Abel Mosiuoa
27. Phangisile Emmaculate Khumalo
28. Samuel Monareng

==== Gauteng ====
1. Thabang Theophilus Nkani
2. Sibusiso Dumisani Nyathi
3. Moses Makhaza
4. Carol Mafagane
5. Gama Oscar Mazibuko
6. Godfrey Nkhasi
7. Bafana Andries Mahlabe
8. Lindiwe Lucia Mkhwanazi
9. Crossby Vusi Shongwe
10. Palesa Constance Khashane
11. Mzukisi Vincent Ronyuza
12. Nelisiwe Terry Mahlobo
13. Lerato Ndlovu
14. Jan Jabulani Mahlangu
15. Mthokozisi Theophilus Dhlamini
16. Neville Dilebo
17. Joel Sihle Ngubane
18. Victor Letlhogonolo Moseki
19. Phoka Paulus Motaung
20. Annah Buyisiwe Xaba
21. Anthony Steven Zengele
22. Lungelo Philani Nduli
23. Edward Nzimande
24. Musawenkosi Mhlabuhlangene Gasa
25. Lehlohonolo Johannes Motseko
26. Zacharia Msebenzi Mazibuko
27. Bogadi Onica Maphisa
28. Nontokozo Lucia Tshoba
29. Tshepo Mabena
30. Mavis Ntombifuthi Vilakazi
31. David Mandla Skosana
32. Victor Jeremiah Mngomezulu
33. Meshack Sipho Skhosana
34. Sandile Ngcobo
35. Agnes Nomngoma Mabhena
36. Amos Makhosini Mthimunye
37. Elsie Nomakhosazana Mbunjane
38. Peter Gambani Mabena
39. Albert Ramakgahlela Maja
40. Thibule Lornah Ndou
41. Benjamin Blessing Limba
42. Faith Sesi Miya
43. Lindiwe Irene Makubu
44. Andile Carol Maphalala
45. Promise Evelyn Nkosi-Sempe
46. Nicholas Sihle Khumalo
47. Magdeline Makgotso Mokhobo
48. Lorato Mavis Molefe
49. Mamothle Dina Motau
50. Mamosa Ramaisa
51. Sindiswa Olive Mthembu
52. Petunia Msomi
53. Sifiso Xolani Yende
54. Pitsi Phillia Sepaila
55. Bongumusa Siphiwe Maria Dlamini
56. Faith Nobantu Khabanyane
57. Ntomfuthi Pretty Shabalala
58. Moses Tshepo Mahlangu
59. Xolane Matthews Kuzana
60. Oscar Jabulani Mkhaliphi
61. Lindiwe Yvonia Mavimbela
62. Jabulile Margaret Maluleke
63. Zandile Teressa Mbalenhle Mkhize
64. Thandekile Loveness Khumalo
65. Andronica Ngidi
66. Stephen Ndleleni Mkhwanazi
67. Maletsielo Sibongile Gladys Kubheka
68. Rummanah Mohammed
69. Naweed Abader
70. Sandra Carol Charles
71. Bronwyn Evadne Francis
72. Busisiwe Nethononda
73. Reginald Vusimuzi Dube
74. Brenda Mngoma
75. Walden Wayne Barrett
76. Bhekabakubo Isaac Mntambo
77. Vanessa Theresa Kholofelo Marolen
78. Bhekathina Andreas Mdluli
79. Bongani Pikinini
80. Talbert Malope Mokhonoana

==== KwaZulu-Natal ====
1. Nhlanhla Victor Euclid Ngidi
2. Bongumusa Anthony Mkhize
3. Thokozane Andrew Nene
4. Thabisile Mildred Xaba
5. Thulani Innocent Gamede
6. Kwenele Thembelihle Ntshaba
7. Lucky Sithembiso Oscar Hadebe
8. Mfanufikile Derrick Qwabe
9. Thabane Jacques Luthuli
10. Nokulunga Perceviarance Khumalo
11. Thokozani Innocent Mazibuko
12. Nhlakanipho Khulezweni Maphumulo
13. Linda Penwell Mabida
14. Freedom Mondli Buthelezi
15. Perrine Carol Sanchez Lopez
16. Delisile Ntshaba
17. Siyabonga Percival Mkhize
18. Clerkson Mfanafuthi Mbatha
19. Hlumela Monsi Shembe
20. Tembinkosi Ephraim Ntshangase
21. Sibongile Angeline Mthiyane
22. Mhlengi Goodwill Mnkwanyana
23. Prince Samukelo Chonco
24. Sbusiso Scelo Ntanzi
25. Lloyd Phumlani Mfeka
26. Lungisani Graduate Shangase
27. Zibuyile Hadebe
28. Bhekukwenza Selby Sithole
29. Simphiwe Emmanuel Goniwe
30. Thobani Reginald Zuma
31. Nonoza Steady Magula
32. Hlobisile Salvatoris Dlamini
33. Jonathan Bhekizenzo Manzini
34. Gezinhliziyo Vincent Zuma
35. Cebile Seychelle Zuma-Dube
36. Lungelwa Lynette Zwane
37. Nhlakanipho Raymond Khumalo
38. Esau Jacob Madonsela
39. Lungile Ntombifuthi Bhengu-Baloyi
40. Mbali Nala
41. Phathisizwe Donatus Hastings Chiliza
42. Derick Mbukeni Bhengu
43. Ncamisile Wendy Pretty Ndaba
44. Mphikeleli Sabelo Mthethwa
45. Sthembiso Eugene Ndhlangaamandla
46. Khayelihle Blessing Madlala
47. Lungani Wiseman Hlongwa
48. Emmanuel Nkosinathi Mandlenkosi Mthethwa
49. Mervyn Alexander Dirks
50. Nozipho Gracia Thembile Mazibuko
51. Dudu Leocadia Nzama
52. Themba Justice Mabaso
53. Kwazi Brian Mbanjwa
54. Ishana Herena Menchero Barciela
55. Thembelihle Virgina Nzuza
56. Innocent Sifiso Babane Kuzwayo
57. Bonga Gregory Xolani Tusini
58. Sibusiso Bhekumuzi Mbuyazi
59. Thuthukani Madondo
60. Sibusiso Maxwell Benton Sikhakhane
61. Vusumuzi James Hadebe
62. Thomas Thokozani Mthethwa
63. Wiseman Ntuthuko Mkhize
64. Philani Saith Khoza
65. Nandi Nothando Mabel Khumalo
66. Muzi Aubrey Mtshali
67. Phineas Thembikosi Zuma
68. Thobekile Precious Hlambisa
69. Sihle Ndlovu
70. Simanga Desmond Mabaso
71. Nobuhle Favourite Khumalo
72. Menelisi Richman Ntshangase
73. Ntombikayise Patricia Zuma
74. Bonginkosi Cyprian Mngadi
75. Lindani Blessed Ngubane
76. Nompilo Vezokuhle Ntshangase
77. Thobeka Nomonde Mthethwa
78. Armstrong Siyabonga Mvelase
79. Andile Cyril Khanyile

==== Limpopo ====
1. Velile Cyril Jack
2. John Khombomuni Ngobeni
3. Balanganani Michael Mudzusi
4. Tshameleni Emma Ndlovu
5. Takalani Vivian Tshipote
6. Vuthu Nkuna
7. Lioyd Papani Chabalala
8. Hendry Aleck Nkuna
9. Charmaine Petunia Nel
10. Tlabo Joseph Malebogo
11. Mmashela Shirley Magoro
12. Diyane Maurice Sithole
13. Leonard Joseph Maremane
14. Thabo Gershon Jack
15. Tintswalo Virginia Maluleke
16. Selelo Abram Seakamela
17. Shapo Johanna Raphahlelo
18. Ndzunisani Lazarous Baloyi
19. Johannes Sello Modiba
20. Gezani Joseph Makhuvele
21. Pfuluwani Mudanalwo
22. Moraswana Frank Madihlaba
23. Sello Bright Mashigo
24. Matevhutevhu Michael Rasikhinya
25. Patrick Lawson Masuluke
26. Ndlolane Amos Joseph Sethole
27. Hlupheka Peter Maluleke
28. Nkhesani Josephina Manganyi
29. Selaelo Paulette Rangata
30. Maphala Lazarus Mosena
31. Hlambanya Simon Mathebula
32. Edwin Maropeng Lebago
33. Maite Philemon Morata
34. Lalane Patrick Mojela
35. Matlhatse Delbrah Nkuna
36. Christopher Mabasa
37. Nokuphumula Moakamedi
38. Mzamani Kenneth Maluleke
39. Tshikani Christopher Shirindza
40. Letsiri George Phaahla
41. Segeshe Judas Malepe
42. Lwalane Joseph Moraba
43. Zimkunyi Samora Mashele
44. Hlayiseka Richard Makhubela
45. Mzamani Josias Maswanganyi
46. Famanda July Sibisi
47. Msesenyane Samuel Baloyi
48. Leshole Simon Ramano
49. Masilo Sello Joseph Malakalaka
50. Mmabjalwa Maria Mmalebati
51. Emely Mhlongo
52. Morifi Winnie Morena
53. Hemilton Mamoloko Masebe
54. Moloko Courtly Lebogo
55. Modjadji Edward Motadi
56. Wisani Raymond Sikhalela
57. Phetole Peter Mamatlepa
58. Nkateko Nsuku Cedrick Chauke
59. Sefularo David Moabelo
60. Lucas Khongkhi Baloyi
61. Sonnyboy Abel Sekoboane
62. Enny Kedibone Motsepe
63. Mmabolela Phillip Banda
64. Mapharashe Gibson Maesela

==== Mpumalanga ====
1. Morongwe Mary Phadi
2. Benjamin Benon Nxumayo
3. Jabulani Roy Mdhluli
4. Mias Puleng Fenyane
5. Joshua Ezekiel Lukhele
6. Pekky Elliot Shongwe
7. Gabeni Moses Ndimande
8. Tshepo Godfrey Sikhosana
9. Nomaqhawe Christleagriselder Bungane-Mtshweni
10. Baswabile Beauty Mashiteng
11. John Lastborn Zimo
12. Buti Saul Sibeko
13. Smangele Sellinah Masina
14. Lerato Patrick Moloi
15. Stephen Moketjane
16. Mzwandile Joel Mkhatshwa
17. Phanuel Mvula Manana
18. Vuyisile Adelaide Vilakazi
19. Mfiso Edgar Mngomezulu
20. Jabulani Johannes Sibeko
21. Zinhle Sanele Jennefier Miya
22. Thulisile Heathrow Shabangu
23. Mike Mhlupheki Ngobeni
24. Isaah Becony Maloka
25. Nonhlanhla Mnisi
26. Sipho David Hlatshwayo
27. Lucky Mkansi
28. Elda Mthombeni
29. Sifiso Advocate Zulu
30. Junior Sipho Mtsweni
31. Sithembiso Ria Mondlana
32. Thulisile Marina Makena
33. Mandla Wonderboy Mokwena
34. Themba Paradise Gulube
35. Sibusiso Given Mbonani
36. Zweli Mxolisi Mahlobo
37. Nonhlanhla Kelinah Mahlangu
38. Mlungisi Patrick Nkambule
39. Patricia Nonkululeko Nonyane
40. Martha Tumelo Masilela
41. Lebogang Martin Manzini
42. Sydney Keith Maluka
43. Esther Welma Mnisi
44. Nonhlanhla Chabane
45. Lucky James Malomane
46. Thulani Zweli Nkuna
47. Zacharia Khwithi Mojalefa
48. Nkosingiphile Vusi Nkambule
49. Zinhle Sannah Nhlapho

==== North-West ====
1. Lerato Motshabi Maria Teme
2. Bosa Daisy Ledwaba
3. Richard Zwelinzima Siziba
4. Tebogo Frank Ramashilabele
5. Daniel Buyani Makhubu
6. Celest Mpho Mahlakoleng
7. Nthebiseng Nelly Modungwa
8. Thabang Lucas Nxamagele
9. Mandisa Nomalanga Mbangi
10. Victor Sehome
11. Josiah Dedrick Bele
12. Bareng Clarence Jabana
13. Reginald Thapelo Motshegare
14. Otshepeng Boikanyo Maotwe
15. Lindi Basetsana Ngqobo
16. Athembele Tando
17. Tsholofelo Ramokala
18. Kelebogile Cynthia Mamogale
19. Daniel Keamogetse Maleka
20. Barney Boitumelo Dilapisho
21. Thato Gift Mampane
22. Emmanuel Willy Serekwane
23. Tickey Elizabeth Chabanku
24. Tshenolo Christian Molawa
25. Makhetha Abram Lehola
26. Josephine Mashinini
27. Thabo Godfrey Ramaboea
28. Nomxolisi Macokocoko-Tandabantu
29. Keobone Jubilee Kehositse
30. Matlhodi Margaret Jebetle
31. Tshekiso George Palai
32. Tiisetso Donimie Motlhabane
33. Molahlehi Isaac Genu
34. Tshabonyana Lydia Mogapi
35. Motshabi Herman Moilwa
36. Pitso Peter Ramathelesa
37. Nthamane Mitta Dithejane
38. Seuntjie Johannes Kgoane

==== Northern Cape ====
1. Boipelo Shirley Jarvis
2. Johannes Raseriti Tau
3. Letshego Enes Moremi
4. Jacob Stanley Mokwena
5. Fihliwe Revelation Ndumiso
6. Lemogang Nelson Makoke
7. William Sindisile Madyo
8. Kenalemang Gladys Peprah
9. Pako Theophilious Semamai
10. Cassim Mahomed
11. Danelle Edwardine Van Rooi
12. Matthews Marumo Gladwin Swartz
13. Piet Louw
14. Sello Neville Motlhabakwe
15. Katrina Van Rooi
16. Mietjie Van Rooi

==== Western Cape ====
1. Simon Fumanekile Booi
2. Faizel Moosa
3. Moosa Joshua Mohlala
4. Mavis Wendy Hlazo
5. Lennox Ntsodo
6. Nomathamsanqa Thami Ncanywa
7. Ivy Thandiswa Gqiba
8. Nosicelo Njwenca
9. Gamalihleli Cuba
10. Loyiso Davidson Peace
11. Ndodomzi Welcome Mkabile
12. Ishler Joy Prag
13. Sikelelwa Nube-Booi
14. Wele Harrison Jibiliza
15. Kumari Marinus
16. Mhlawakhe Gana
17. Mzwandile Simon Biko
18. Ncedisa Mpemnyama
19. Thembekile Richard Majola
20. Reuben Enoch Mjobi
21. Benjamin James Marsala
22. Mizuvukile Samuel Sompeta
23. Linda Nonyameko Klaas
24. Nokuzola Thelma Simayile
25. Tlotliso Fose
26. Dumsani Nicholas Nhlapo
27. Zukiswa Lucia Frans
28. Shihaam Lagkar
29. Desmond Block
30. Anathi Precias Ndayi
31. Thozama Mayambela
32. Ethel Thandiwe Manana
33. Ntomboxolo Tsholoba
34. Fidel Issel
35. Nomvuyiso Mneno
36. Zelda Ann Hintsa Hintsa
37. Gary William Walduck
38. Abraham Boy Nel
39. Lungiswa Tshangela
40. Gaynor Janine Witbooi
41. Abraham Boy Nel

== United Democratic Movement ==
=== National ===
1. **Bantubonke Harrington Holomisa**
2. **Nqabayomzi Lawrence Saziso Kwankwa**
3. Christobel Thandiwe Nontenja
4. Yongama Ludwe Zigebe
5. Mthunzi Perry-Mason Mdwaba
6. Ashton Mlindeni Sibango
7. Inga Namhla Ndibongo De Villiers
8. Pumza Malefane
9. Sisa Mbeki
10. Letlhogonolo Tungamirai
11. Humphrey Sangolibanzi Nobongoza
12. Phathiwe Ndleleni
13. Gamalihleli Cuba
14. Sylvester Sive Majokweni
15. Mamogodi Benjamin Mmotla
16. Motlogelwa George Matjila
17. Zandile Alicia Mpikwa
18. Nobunto Faith Mzimane
19. Vuyolwethu Duda
20. Kgomotso Patience Zitha
21. Mfundiso Mkrokrelwa
22. Zolisa Ishmael Ndzondo
23. Sifiso Lionel Mkhonza
24. Johannes Goliath
25. Zandisile Xabendlini
26. Lennox Bogen Gaehler
27. Zandile Maria Phiri
28. Msawenkosi Dumela
29. Mkululi Mackson Mcotsho
30. Andile Jabavu
31. Nwabisa Happiness Yanta
32. Joseph Thembinkosi Mngonyama
33. Noko Blondy Lephalala
34. Samuel Matshwenyego Mualefe
35. Justice Tsepang Smile
36. Sibusiso Anthony Molake
37. Cynthia Nocollege Majeke
38. Astrid Deidre Al-Anani
39. Pakamisa Mdemka
40. Nobuhle Patricia Ndlovu
41. Dangisani Irene Maluleke
42. Magogodi Jeanneth Malebe
43. Giyana Eric Mbatsane
44. Johannes Monnamoholo Mathe
45. Usivile Mboneli
46. Patrick Vusumuzi Mohlala
47. Lulama Eunice Majivolo
48. Nontokozo Faith Dladla
49. Tsheletsi Julius Moja
50. Disang Victor Sekgetho
51. Simphiwe Moti
52. Amkelwa Nkuntsula
53. William Bulelani Bobotyane
54. Lumka Lucia Dlaza
55. Thuliswa Veronica Sandla
56. Boysey Return Gumede
57. Justice Mafete Madingoane
58. Ayanda Magawana
59. Zanele Mkutyukelwa
60. Bongani John Nzweni
61. Sinalo Makopo
62. Khululwa Anta
63. Sibusiso Kwekwana
64. Ntethelelo Zulu
65. Masabagole Owen Maledimo
66. Ditlhare Emily Moletsane
67. Thandeka Amanda Magazi
68. Zizipho Bokwana
69. Xolani Sonaba
70. Bulelwa Mdletye
71. Babalwa Ngalo
72. Siphumelele Pretty Mbhamali
73. Boitumelo Godone Thupane
74. Lerato Ellen Hongile
75. Aphiwe Skele
76. Mabatho Sophie Marema
77. Azola Dabula
78. Rendani Mphotwana
79. Alicia Ntombomzi Makumba-Meveni
80. Nomvelo Zungu
81. Ntombizodwa Eunica Makhubedu
82. Nthabiseng Welheminah Zwane
83. Tabile Walvis Sodo
84. Elsie Maserame Dogo
85. Khanyiswa Mdladlamba
86. Nontlahla Zanzima
87. Zamajola Sihlobo
88. Samukelisiwe Witness Mthethwa
89. Matseke Nancy Mabinane
90. Nomanesi Gxagxiso
91. Fundeka Doris Rululu
92. Iviwe Xhathi
93. Brendon Brain Gans
94. Mvuyisi Zilwa
95. Vuyiswa Mtelekiso
96. Goodness Jabulile Mthiya
97. Tumisho Brigett Maringa
98. Phokoane Grace Sebaeng
99. Nomilile Synoria Volofu
100. Zwelitsha Dlisani
101. Xolisa Sean Plaatjie
102. Sibabalwe Centane
103. Patricia Xoliswa Matiwane
104. Edward Mokake
105. Esme Siviwe Maqabangqa
106. Victor Fena
107. Vuyani Bongani Masimini
108. Tholinhlanhla Xulu
109. Lungile Nonhle Zulu
110. Rosemary Vezile Zungu
111. Malekgala Elsie Mmotla-Makwela
112. Makgatso Doris Mokhondo
113. Makwetle Silvia Mmotla
114. Nkosinathi Bhokileni
115. Tumelo Israel Moagi
116. Boipelo Perseverence Kesaobaka Kgomanyane
117. Buhle Khalenkomo
118. Noziphiwe Silo
119. Nokuthula Salelo
120. Mamotho Elisa Nkhasho
121. Luyolo Sitole
122. Abram Tseko Mqedhlane
123. Mandla Hlanekela
124. Wisizwi Billie
125. Lusapho Lukhanyo Siwundla
126. Siphe Mosses Tolom
127. Zolela Yeki
128. Nontando Mnqumevu
129. Ntombekhaya Caroline Matimi
130. George Salee Lovejoy Navardo Sebybo
131. Thabiso Edwin Lebelo
132. Rabogajana Orwest Phulafudi
133. Sbusiso Scelo Ntanzi
134. Malesela Jacob Kekana
135. Kgwaboi Hendrick Mogashoa
136. Mmatlhako Joggie Rakumaku
137. Agape Busisiwe Zwane
138. Ayanda Yengwa
139. Godfrey Kealeboga Menyatsoe
140. Sonwabile Simon Gxiva
141. Sivuyile Vakanqana
142. Xolisa Bafana
143. Nkosikhona Eunice Ngubane
144. Tshehlana Becker Semela
145. Nokuthula Happiness Mqwathi
146. Siphumze Maham
147. Rodwell Mthuthuzeli Qambela
148. Boniswa Nompumelelo Francina Mdwaba
149. Phendulwa Myeki
150. Mbuso Poswa
151. Bheki Jocky Sibiya
152. Mxolisi Mtokwana
153. Sydney Mabumbulu
154. Sinazo Mtila
155. Velenkosini Remmington Mazibuko
156. Nyaniso Hamilton Mfihlo
157. Mwelela James Mthembu
158. Dinkwanyane Frans Thobejane
159. Ramadimetja Phillipine Ledwaba
160. Mapase Samuel Nkgadima
161. Dimakatso Nancy Phayane
162. Sipamandla Hlazo
163. Gaositwe Patrick Molawa
164. Elias Lungisani Mtebeni
165. Mncediseni Rangana
166. Johannes Nkambule
167. Jeanett Xoliswa Wittes
168. Ephraim Mahumapelo Rapulana
169. Asanda Doris Sjendu
170. Thandekile Va
171. Thembakazi Princess Jacobs
172. Livingstone Matiti
173. Linda Ndzeleni
174. Metuli Nkebe
175. Linda Notayi
176. Asiphe Zilibele
177. Bukelwa Elizabeth Mnqumevu
178. Olwethu Vuyo Cezula
179. Arshad Bakhas Mahomed
180. Lucky Ntokozo Fani
181. Mxolisi Eugene Khumalo
182. Emelda Raesibe Bamatshitshidi
183. Nkgere Rudolf Tema
184. Palesa Rose Morulana
185. Dikgang Elvis Moyo
186. Nowethu Ethel Voyiya
187. Matsie Leah Ntsie
188. Zodidi Mgadi
189. Fezeka Sylvia Majola
190. Amos Ngcuka
191. Tseliso William Thamahane
192. Zelda Steyn
193. Mamokete Letia Mhlotshana
194. Josua Jacobus Engelbrecht Richter
195. Fezile Mntabeko
196. Motisetsi Mdlazi
197. Phakiso Molongoana
198. Azwinaki Joyce Rabakali
199. Sinetemba Maliti

=== Regional ===
==== Eastern Cape ====
1. Lennox Bogen Gaehler
2. Matthewis Mandla Peter
3. Zandile Maria Phiri
4. Mfundiso Mkrokrelwa
5. Siphokazi Milet Dambuza
6. Zandisile Xabendlini
7. Bongani Hlanzwa
8. Azola Dabula
9. Siyabonga Dyonase
10. Lea Lourine Maputuma
11. Thulani David Nokwindla
12. Thandekile Va
13. Zolani Tyandela

==== Free State ====
1. Zandile Alicia Mpikwa
2. Anton Daniël Coetzee
3. Bongani John Nzweni
4. Leseli Ezekiel Marema
5. Sibusiso Anthony Molake

==== Gauteng ====
1. Andile Jabavu
2. Letlhogonolo Tungamirai
3. Yongama Ludwe Zigebe
4. Johannes Goliath
5. Zama Mankai
6. Daniel Alwin Prentjies
7. Ndidi Gcalangobuthi
8. Nkosinathie Mbhele
9. Edward Mokake

==== KwaZulu-Natal ====
1. Nyaniso Hamilton Mfihlo
2. Arshad Bakhas Mahomed
3. Boysey Return Gumede
4. Tholinhlanhla Xulu
5. Ntethelelo Zulu

==== Limpopo ====
1. Mamogodi Benjamin Mmotla
2. Dangisani Irene Maluleke
3. Tebogo Colin Ledwaba
4. Noko Blondy Lephalala
5. Ntombizodwa Eunica Makhubedu
6. Boitumelo Godone Thupane
7. Action Ndzalama Kubayi
8. Khomotso Linah Maringa

==== Mpumalanga ====
1. Giyana Eric Mbatsane
2. Sifiso Lionel Mkhonza
3. John Majadibodu

==== North West ====
1. Teboho Samuel Sephai
2. Msawenkosi Dumela
3. Samuel Matshwenyego Mualefe
4. Disang Victor Sekgetho
5. Magdeline Mateka Letlape

==== Northern Cape ====
1. Nceba Godfrey Tyobeka
2. Ayanda Magawana
3. Mohlamunye Maria Mokonene

==== Western Cape ====
1. Bongani Burnet Maqungwana
2. Lulama Eunice Majivolo
3. Nwabisa Happiness Yanta
4. Zamajola Sihlobo
5. Pakamisa Mdemka

=== Provincial ===
==== Eastern Cape ====
1. Mkululi Mackson Mcotsho
2. Noncedo Zinti
3. Zolisa Ishmael Ndzondo
4. Cynthia Nocollege Majeke
5. Usivile Mboneli
6. Pretorius Fikile Zondeka
7. William Bulelani Bobotyane
8. Raymond Knock
9. Siphokazi Milet Dambuza
10. Sizwe Tame
11. Thembinkosi Kiriakis Jacobs
12. Bongani Mazingisa
13. Nobunto Faith Mzimane
14. Babalo Lawrence Bunu
15. Xolani Sonaba
16. Ndumiso Cakatha
17. Cebisile Hlazo
18. Zolani Tyandela
19. Nomtshato Margaret Nqwazi
20. Irene Nomachule Quvile
21. Matthewis Mandla Peter
22. Thobile Benjamin Gidigidi
23. Zandile Maria Phiri
24. Mfundiso Mkrokrelwa
25. Sondezwa Ngcani
26. Khanyiswa Mdladlamba
27. Sinalo Makopo
28. Zandisile Xabendlini
29. Azola Dabula
30. Nceba Patrick Ntweni
31. Fezile Mntabeko
32. Bongani Hlanzwa
33. Josua Jacobus Engelbrecht Richter
34. Thandekile Templeton Nqenqa
35. Sylvester Sive Majokweni
36. Thulani David Nokwindla
37. Nontle Sheshegu
38. Thandekile Va
39. Thembakazi Princess Jacobs
40. Livingstone Matiti
41. Xolisa Sean Plaatjie
42. Solomzi Fani
43. Victor Dumisa Tisani
44. Brendon Brain Gans
45. Mzwamadoda Ferrington Sinyanya
46. Pumza Malefane
47. Lea Lourine Maputuma
48. Wellman Zandisile Bongco
49. Sibusiso Qwele
50. Siphumze Maham
51. Boniswa Nompumelelo Francina Mdwaba
52. Ndumiso Elliot Memani
53. Mandla Hlanekela
54. Wisizwi Billie

==== Free State ====
1. Abram Tseko Mqedhlane
2. Vuyolwethu Duda
3. Zandile Alicia Mpikwa
4. Anton Dani°L Coetzee
5. Sibusiso Anthony Molake
6. Zelda Steyn
7. Amkelwa Nkuntsula
8. Leseli Ezekiel Marema
9. Bongani John Nzweni
10. Zizipho Bokwana
11. Mabatho Sophie Marema
12. Zwelitsha Dlisani
13. Tumelo Sebegi
14. Mamotho Elisa Nkhasho
15. Asipe Duda
16. Kgosietsile Shuping
17. Mzuvukile Khohliso
18. Gloria Mosa Mahloko
19. Vuyani Bongani Masimini
20. Jeanett Xoliswa Wittes
21. Sibusiso Ngaphi
22. Zamajola Sihlobo
23. Luyolo Sitole
24. Johannes Monnamoholo Mathe
25. Elsie Maserame Dogo
26. Nkosikhona Eunice Ngubane
27. Tshehlana Becker Semela
28. Nokuthula Happiness Mqwathi
29. Ephraim Mahumapelo Rapulana

==== Gauteng ====
1. Mthunzi Perry-Mason Mdwaba
2. Phathiwe Ndleleni
3. Inga Namhla Ndibongo De Villiers
4. Andile Jabavu
5. Patrick Vusumuzi Mohlala
6. Yongama Ludwe Zigebe
7. Phakiso Molongoana
8. Astrid Deidre Al-Anani
9. Wilford Mlamleli Zaza
10. Johannes Goliath
11. Daniel Alwin Prentjies
12. Zama Mankai
13. Ndidi Gcalangobuthi
14. Fana Vusimuzi Amon Nkosi
15. Sakhiwo Kibido
16. Sibabalwe Centane
17. Lucky Ntokozo Fani
18. Khululwa Anta
19. Lumka Lucia Dlaza
20. Nonkululeko Priscilla Godana
21. Siposovuyo Vince Kholwane
22. Zukisani Athwell Mantshongo
23. Patricia Xoliswa Matiwane
24. Bulelwa Mdletye
25. Motisetsi Mdlazi
26. Rendani Mphotwana
27. Azwinaki Joyce Rabakali
28. Linda Ndzeleni
29. Metuli Nkebe
30. Linda Notayi
31. Phendulwa Myeki
32. Mbuso Poswa
33. Bheki Jocky Sibiya
34. Lusapho Lukhanyo Siwundla
35. Siphe Mosses Tolom
36. Zolela Yeki
37. Nontlahla Zanzima
38. Mvuyisi Zilwa

==== KwaZulu-Natal ====
1. Velenkosini Remmington Mazibuko
2. Nyaniso Hamilton Mfihlo
3. Joseph Thembinkosi Mngonyama
4. Nobuhle Patricia Ndlovu
5. Mwelela James Mthembu
6. Nontokozo Faith Dladla
7. Boysey Return Gumede
8. Arshad Bakhas Mahomed
9. Ntethelelo Zulu
10. Mxolisi Eugene Khumalo
11. Siphumelele Pretty Mbhamali
12. Samukelisiwe Witness Mthethwa
13. Sbusiso Scelo Ntanzi
14. Goodness Jabulile Mthiya
15. Nqobani Victor Nxumalo
16. Nomvelo Zungu
17. Tholinhlanhla Xulu
18. Lungile Nonhle Zulu
19. Rosemary Vezile Zungu

==== Limpopo ====
1. Nkaetji Stanley Manaka
2. Mamogodi Benjamin Mmotla
3. Noko Blondy Lephalala
4. Dangisani Irene Maluleke
5. Tsheletsi Julius Moja
6. Justice Mafete Madingoane
7. Masabagole Owen Maledimo
8. Boitumelo Godone Thupane
9. Ntombizodwa Eunica Makhubedu
10. Fanyane Eric Nkosi
11. Kgoshana Olga Molwantoa
12. Tebogo Colin Ledwaba
13. Abraham Tshepiso Mabilo
14. Action Ndzalama Kubayi
15. Chrestina Mmatseleng Mokwena
16. Motlalepule Lizzy Ramashala
17. Dimakatjo Tina Rakumaku
18. Sekgothe Koos Mokgoadi
19. Tumisho Brigett Maringa
20. Koketso Betha
21. Ramasela Evidence Tjale
22. Thabiso Edwin Lebelo
23. Rabogajana Orwest Phulafudi
24. Ramadimetja Phillipine Ledwaba
25. Nkgere Rudolf Tema
26. Emelda Raesibe Bamatshitshidi
27. Palesa Rose Morulana
28. Dinkwanyane Frans Thobejane
29. Mapase Samuel Nkgadima
30. Malesela Jacob Kekana
31. Kgwaboi Hendrick Mogashoa

==== Mpumalanga ====
1. Simphiwe Moti
2. Sifiso Lionel Mkhonza
3. Kgomotso Patience Zitha
4. Giyana Eric Mbatsane
5. John Majadibodu
6. Mohlamunye Maria Mokonene
7. Zanele Mkutyukelwa
8. Sydney Dion Sibuyi
9. Alda Delisile Magudulela
10. Thandeka Amanda Magazi
11. Aphiwe Skele
12. Jubethe Bongani Mendu
13. Tabile Walvis Sodo
14. Busisiwe Prudence Sibanyoni
15. Fundeka Doris Rululu
16. Sibusisiwe Vayo
17. Mkuseli Shadrack Mhlauli
18. Sabatha Elijah Msimango
19. Nomilile Synoria Volofu
20. Zodidi Mgadi
21. Fezeka Sylvia Majola
22. Amos Ngcuka
23. Elias Lungisani Mtebeni
24. Johannes Nkambule
25. Sonwabile Simon Gxiva
26. Sivuyile Vakanqana
27. Xolisa Bafana
28. Buhle Khalenkomo
29. Nokuthula Salelo
30. Mkhokheli Nteya
31. Lumko Mtendeni
32. Justice Tsepang Smile
33. Mayibuye Fondorana

==== North-West ====
1. Motlogelwa George Matjila
2. Msawenkosi Dumela
3. Samuel Matshwenyego Mualefe
4. Magogodi Jeanneth Malebe
5. Disang Victor Sekgetho
6. Ayanda Magawana
7. Ditlhare Emily Moletsane
8. Lerato Ellen Hongile
9. Nthabiseng Welheminah Zwane
10. Basimanebotlhe Benjamin Tekanyo
11. Nomanesi Gxagxiso
12. Ofentse Moemimang Theophilus Sekamogeng
13. Phokoane Grace Sebaeng
14. Vuyokazi Hlazo
15. Ramonne Jopa Khunou
16. Magdeline Mateka Letlape
17. Matsie Leah Ntsie
18. Peter Mosa Zwane
19. Thomas Aobakwe Mangena
20. Tumelo Israel Moagi
21. Yonela Hlanjwa-Msikeni
22. Dikeledi Mokaatsela
23. William Thapelo Mmusi
24. Dikgang Elvis Moyo
25. Nowethu Ethel Voyiya
26. Teboho Samuel Sephai
27. Agape Busisiwe Zwane
28. Ayanda Yengwa
29. Godfrey Kealeboga Menyatsoe
30. Nkosinathi Bhokileni
31. Boipelo Perseverence Kesaobaka Kgomanyane

==== Western Cape ====
1. Bulelwa Nikilitha Zondeka
2. Bongani Burnet Maqungwana
3. Thembelani Ryan Mbuku
4. Nwabisa Happiness Yanta
5. Pakamisa Mdemka
6. Nceba Godfrey Tyobeka
7. Lulama Eunice Majivolo
8. Thuliswa Veronica Sandla
9. Sibusiso Kwekwana
10. Lwazi Nobanda
11. Siphesihle Mfecane
12. Sinetemba Maliti
13. Asiphe Zilibele
14. Bukelwa Elizabeth Mnqumevu
15. Babalwa Ngalo
16. Mxolisi Mtokwana
17. Sydney Mabumbulu
18. Alicia Ntombomzi Makumba-Meveni
19. Nontando Mnqumevu
20. Ntombekhaya Caroline Matimi
21. George Salee Lovejoy Navardo Sebybo
22. Esme Siviwe Maqabangqa
23. Victor Fena
24. Siyabulela Njilo
25. Vuyiswa Mtelekiso
26. Olwethu Vuyo Cezula
27. Sweetness Thandokazi Zito
28. Siphokazi Portia Moloi
29. Vuyiseka Mrawuli
30. Ayanda Kumah
31. Sinazo Mtila
