= List of National Assembly members of the 28th Parliament of South Africa =

List

Members of the National Assembly of the 28th South African Parliament
←	27th

Overview
- Term: 14 June 2024 –
- Election: 29 May 2024
- Government: Government (287): ANC (159); DA (87); IFP (17); PA (9); VF+ (6); UDM (3); Al Jama-ah (2); RISE (2); Good (1); PAC (1)
- Opposition: Official Opposition (58): MK (58); Other parties (55): EFF (39); ActionSA (6); ACDP (3); ATM (2); BOSA (2); NCC (2); UAT (1)

This is a list of members of the National Assembly of South Africa, elected in the 2024 general election, for the term 2024–2029.

== Composition ==
Party	Seats	%
African National Congress	159	39.75
Democratic Alliance	87	21.75
uMkhonto weSizwe	58	14.5
Economic Freedom Fighters	39	9.75
Inkatha Freedom Party	17	4.25
Patriotic Alliance	9	2.25
Freedom Front Plus	6	1.5
ActionSA	6	1.5
African Christian Democratic Party	3	0.75
United Democratic Movement	3	0.75
Rise Mzansi	2	0.5
Build One South Africa	2	0.5
African Transformation Movement	2	0.5
Al Jama-ah	2	0.5
National Coloured Congress	2	0.5
Pan Africanist Congress	1	0.25
United Africans Transformation	1	0.25
Good	1	0.25
Total	400	100.00

== Members ==
Members of Parliament, including their party affiliations and the lists from which they were elected, as of 19 October 2026:

Name	Party	List
Zelna Abader	MK	Gauteng
Alexandra Abrahams	DA	National
Fadiel Adams	NCC	National
Rachel Adams	ANC	National
Wendy Alexander	DA	Gauteng
Mokgadi Aphiri	ANC	National
Laetitia Arries	EFF	North West
Patrick Atkinson	DA	National
Willie Aucamp	DA	National
Michael Bagraim	DA	National
Edwin Baptie	DA	National
Juliet Basson	PA	National
Leon Basson	DA	National
Andrew Bateman	DA	Western Cape
Edwin Bath	DA	National
Alan Beesley	ActionSA	National
Darren Bergman	DA	National
Joyce Bila	ANC	Limpopo
Kate Bilankulu	ANC	Limpopo
Jack Bloom	DA	Gauteng
Mazwi Blose	EFF	KwaZulu-Natal
Tsholofelo Bodlani	DA	National
Nicole Bollman	DA	KwaZulu-Natal
Polly Boshielo	ANC	National
Wynand Boshoff	VF+	National
Alvin Botes	ANC	National
Eleanore Bouw-Spies	DA	Western Cape
Glynnis Breytenbach	DA	National
Mark John Burke	DA	Western Cape
Zolile Burns-Ncamashe	ANC	Eastern Cape
Elphas Buthelezi	IFP	KwaZulu-Natal
Noma Buthelezi	MK	National
Zuzifa Buthelezi	IFP	National
Ian Cameron	DA	Western Cape
Rosemary Capa	ANC	National
Yusuf Cassim	DA	Eastern Cape
Russel Cebekhulu	IFP	National
Zibuse Cele	MK	National
Steve Chabane	ANC	Limpopo
Toby Chance	DA	National
Meagan Chauke	ANC	National
Mergan Chetty	DA	KwaZulu-Natal
Sindisiwe Chikunga	ANC	National
Naledi Chirwa	EFF	Gauteng
Delmaine Christians	DA	National
Katherine Christie	DA	Western Cape
Michéle Clarke	DA	National
Erald Cloete	ANC	Northern Cape
Barbara Creecy	ANC	National
Marlon Daniels	PA	Eastern Cape
Sharon Davids	ANC	Western Cape
Andrew de Blocq	DA	Gauteng
Patricia de Lille	Good	National
Jan de Villiers	DA	Western Cape
Heloïse Denner	VF+	National
Betty Diale	EFF	North West
Thoko Didiza	ANC	National
Masefako Dikgale	ANC	Limpopo
Khusela Diko	ANC	National
Dikeledi Direko	ANC	Free State
Sello Dithebe	ANC	Free State
Dorries Dlakude	ANC	National
Mbali Dlamini	EFF	National
Mluleki Dlelanga	ANC	Eastern Cape
Wesley Douglas	MK	National
Cameron Dugmore	ANC	Western Cape
Mary-Ann Dunjwa	ANC	Eastern Cape
Janho Engelbrecht	DA	Gauteng
Farhat Essack	DA	Western Cape
Sakiena Frenchman	NCC	Western Cape
Cedric Frolick	ANC	Eastern Cape
Siyabonga Gama	MK	KwaZulu-Natal
Thulani Gamede	MK	KwaZulu-Natal
Makashule Gana	RISE	National
Nqabisa Gantsho	ANC	Eastern Cape
Musawenkosi Gasa	MK	National
Nonceba Gcaleka-Mazibuko	ANC	Gauteng
Sixolisa Gcilishe	EFF	Gauteng
Nhlanhla Gcwabaza	MK	National
Malusi Gigaba	ANC	National
Nomalungelo Gina	ANC	KwaZulu-Natal
Zuko Godlimpi	ANC	National
Enoch Godongwana	ANC	National
Mimmy Gondwe	DA	National
Yanga Govana	ANC	National
Samantha Graham	DA	National
Pieter Groenewald	VF+	National
Mondli Gungubele	ANC	National
Siviwe Gwarube	DA	National
Nhlanhla Hadebe	IFP	National
Mzimasi Hala	ANC	Eastern Cape
Fasiha Hassan	ANC	National
Chris Hattingh	DA	National
Ernest Hendricks	PA	Western Cape
Ganief Hendricks	Al Jama-ah	National
Velenkosini Hlabisa	IFP	National
Nobuntu Hlazo-Webster	BOSA	National
Mkhuleko Hlengwa	IFP	National
Altia Sthembile Hlongo	ANC	National
John Hlophe	MK	National
Bantu Holomisa	UDM	National
Werner Horn	DA	National
Chris Hunsinger	DA	National
Haseenabanu Ismail	DA	Gauteng
Sisipho Jama	ANC	National
Dereleen James	ActionSA	Gauteng
Theresa Jeyi	PA	Gauteng
Ciska Jordaan	DA	National
Betty Kegakilwe	ANC	North West
Pinky Kekana	ANC	National
Gaolatlhe Kgabo	ANC	North West
Kabelo Kgobisa-Ngcaba	DA	Western Cape
Karabo Khakhau	DA	Free State
Zama Khanyase	ANC	National
Angel Khanyile	DA	National
Makoti Khawula	EFF	National
Muzi Khoza	EFF	National
Juliet Khumalo	ANC	Mpumalanga
Damien Klopper	DA	Mpumalanga
Malebo Kobe	ActionSA	National
Dianne Kohler Barnard	DA	National
Lencel Komane	EFF	Limpopo
Gerhard Koornhof	ANC	National
Henro Krüger	DA	Mpumalanga
Mmamoloko Kubayi	ANC	National
Thalente Kubheka	MK	National
Andisiwe Kumbaca	ANC	Eastern Cape
Nqabayomzi Kwankwa	UDM	National
Cathlene Labuschagne	DA	National
Ronald Lamola	ANC	National
Thokozani Langa	IFP	KwaZulu-Natal
Karl le Roux	DA	Western Cape
Dakota Legoete	ANC	North West
Soviet Lekganyane	ANC	National
Sharon Letlape	EFF	North West
Kgosi Letlape	ActionSA	National
Tebogo Letsie	ANC	Gauteng
Steve Letsike	ANC	National
Livhuwani Ligaraba	ANC	Limpopo
Elmarie Linde	DA	Western Cape
Sihle Lonzi	EFF	Mpumalanga
James Lorimer	DA	National
Annelie Lotriet	DA	Free State
Tshepo Louw	ANC	National
Sylvia Lucas	ANC	National
Bhekizizwe Luthuli	IFP	KwaZulu-Natal
Peace Mabe	ANC	Gauteng
Thamsanqa Mabhena	DA	Gauteng
Busaphi Machi	IFP	National
Dean Macpherson	DA	KwaZulu-Natal
Bonginkosi Madikizela	DA	Western Cape
Emerald Madlala	MK	KwaZulu-Natal
Khayelihle Madlala	MK	National
Ntando Maduna	ANC	National
Sello Maeco	ANC	Gauteng
Mokgaetji Mafagane	MK	Gauteng
Thokozile Magagula	ANC	Gauteng
Tandi Mahambehlala	ANC	National
Sipho Mahlangu	ANC	Mpumalanga
Wonder Mahlatsi	UAT	National
Mikateko Mahlaule	ANC	National
David Mahlobo	ANC	National
Supra Mahumapelo	ANC	National
Poppy Mailola	EFF	National
Mmusi Maimane	BOSA	National
Joy Maimela	ANC	National
Pemmy Majodina	ANC	National
Zandile Majozi	IFP	National
Noluthando Makasi	ANC	Western Cape
Moyagabo Makgato	ANC	Limpopo
Lusizo Makhubela-Mashele	ANC	Mpumalanga
Solly Malatsi	DA	National
Julius Malema	EFF	National
Cristopher Nakampe Malematja	ANC	Gauteng
Japhta Malinga	MK	KwaZulu-Natal
Lilian Managa	EFF	Limpopo
Buti Manamela	ANC	National
Boyce Maneli	ANC	Gauteng
Gwede Mantashe	ANC	National
Mzwanele Manyi	MK	Mpumalanga
Omphile Maotwe	EFF	National
Erik Marais	DA	National
Paulnita Marais	EFF	Free State
Thandiswa Marawu	ATM	National
Bridget Masango	DA	National
Matlhodi Maseko	DA	National
Dickson Masemola	ANC	National
Reneiloe Mashabela	EFF	National
Paul Mashatile	ANC	National
Mzwandile Masina	ANC	Gauteng
David Masondo	ANC	National
Joe Maswanganyi	ANC	National
Stanley Mathabatha	ANC	Limpopo
Oscar Mathafa	ANC	Gauteng
Cassel Mathale	ANC	National
Lorato Mathopa	PA	National
Babalwa Mathulelwa	EFF	Eastern Cape
Leigh-Ann Mathys	EFF	National
Nthako Matiase	EFF	National
Chumani Matiwane	EFF	National
Mandlenkosi Matutu	MK	National
David Maynier	DA	Western Cape
Natasha Mazzone	DA	National
Sipho Mbatha	MK	National
Hazel Mbele	MK	National
Fezeka Mbiko	DA	Eastern Cape
Inathi Mbiyo	ANC	Gauteng
Gayton McKenzie	PA	National
Joe McGluwa	DA	North West
Senzo Mchunu	ANC	National
Gugulethu Mchunu	MK	KwaZulu-Natal
Thembeka Mchunu	ANC	National
Mlondi Mdluli	DA	KwaZulu-Natal
Veronica Mente	EFF	National
Kenneth Meshoe	ACDP	National
Nomakhosazana Meth	ANC	National
Phumzile Mgcina	ANC	National
Teliswa Mgweba	ANC	Gauteng
Reginah Mhaule	ANC	National
Nonceba Mhlauli	ANC	National
Nompumelelo Mhlongo	IFP	KwaZulu-Natal
Nqobile Mhlongo	EFF	National
George Michalakis	DA	National
Kevin Mileham	DA	National
Thembinkosi Mjadu	MK	KwaZulu-Natal
Hlengiwe Mkhaliphi	EFF	National
Philasande Mkhize	MK	National
Siphetho Mkhize	MK	National
Siyabonga Mkhize	MK	KwaZulu-Natal
Zweli Mkhize	ANC	National
Bongani Mkongi	MK	National
Lufefe Mkutu	ANC	National
Sizwe Mlotshwa	MK	National
Matsholo Mmolotsane	ANC	Free State
Albert Mncwango	IFP	National
Pinky Mngadi	MK	KwaZulu-Natal
Andile Mngxitama	MK	National
Moleboheng Modise	ANC	Gauteng
Mogodu Moela	ANC	Limpopo
Masetshego Mofokeng	ANC	Free State
Irvin Mogale	MK	KwaZulu-Natal
Thapelo Mogale	EFF	Gauteng
Seiso Mohai	ANC	Free State
Mathibe Mohlala	EFF	National
Julian Mokoena	ANC	Mpumalanga
Mmabatho Mokoena-Zondi	MK	KwaZulu-Natal
Tebogo Mokwele	EFF	Free State
Shunmugam Moodley	MK	National
Stephen Moore	DA	Gauteng
Imraan Moosa	Al Jama-ah	National
Thandi Moraka	ANC	National
Itiseng Morolong	ANC	North West
Sofia Mosikatsi	ANC	Northern Cape
Gift Motaung	MK	National
Sonto Motaung	ANC	National
Angie Motshekga	ANC	Gauteng
Aaron Motsoaledi	ANC	National
Moshome Motubatse	MK	National
Luyolo Mphithi	DA	Gauteng
Mzoleli Mrara	ANC	Eastern Cape
Mnqobi Msezane	MK	National
Eugene Mthethwa	EFF	Eastern Cape
Zwelakhe Mthethwa	MK	National
Jeffrey Mtolo	MK	National
Nombuso Mtolo	ANC	KwaZulu-Natal
Nokwethemba Mtshweni	MK	KwaZulu-Natal
Mariam Muhammad	MK	Gauteng
Corné Mulder	VF+	Western Cape
Tshilidzi Munyai	ANC	Gauteng
Faith Muthambi	ANC	National
Queenie Mvana	ANC	Eastern Cape
Sanele Mwali	MK	KwaZulu-Natal
Nicholas Myburgh	DA	Western Cape
Ronalda Nalumango	ANC	National
Adil Nchabeleng	MK	KwaZulu-Natal
Stella Ndabeni-Abrahams	ANC	Eastern Cape
Nandi Ndalane	ANC	Limpopo
Pumelele Ndamase	ANC	Eastern Cape
Helen Neale-May	ANC	National
Andries Nel	ANC	National
Judith Nemadzinga-Tshabalala	ANC	Gauteng
Siphosethu Ngcobo	IFP	KwaZulu-Natal
Lerato Ngobeni	ActionSA	Gauteng
Alco Ngobese	IFP	Gauteng
Wiseman Ngobese	MK	National
Sihle Ngubane	MK	National
Mlindi Nhanha	DA	Eastern Cape
Carl Niehaus	EFF	Gauteng
Nobuhle Nkabane	ANC	KwaZulu-Natal
Ntombovuyo Nkopane	ANC	Eastern Cape
Ethel Nkosi	ANC	Mpumalanga
Sithembile Nkosi	MK	KwaZulu-Natal
Vusumuzi Nkosi	ANC	Mpumalanga
Baxolile Nodada	DA	National
Nontando Nolutshungu	EFF	Gauteng
Sibonelo Nomvalo	MK	KwaZulu-Natal
Christobel Nontenja	UDM	Eastern Cape
Mncedisi Nontsele	ANC	Eastern Cape
Xola Nqola	ANC	National
Natasha Ntlangwini	EFF	Western Cape
Delisile Ntshaba	MK	KwaZulu-Natal
Lindiwe Ntshalintshali	ANC	National
Khumbudzo Ntshavheni	ANC	National
Dipuo Ntuli	ANC	KwaZulu-Natal
Mdumiseni Ntuli	ANC	National
Nkosinathi Nxumalo	MK	KwaZulu-Natal
Mzwanele Nyhontso	PAC	National
Blade Nzimande	ANC	National
Njabulo Nzuza	ANC	National
Vuyani Pambo	EFF	National
Nazier Paulsen	EFF	National
Wildri Peach	DA	Gauteng
Sheila Peters	PA	Western Cape
Joe Phaahla	ANC	Limpopo
Carol Phiri	ANC	Limpopo
Maakgalake Pholwane	ANC	Limpopo
Windy Plaatjies	ANC	Western Cape
Conrad Poole	DA	National
Leah Potgieter	DA	Gauteng
Emma Powell	DA	National
Dina Pule	ANC	National
Makhosazana Radebe	MK	KwaZulu-Natal
Stanley Ramaila	ANC	Limpopo
Maropene Ramokgopa	ANC	National
Kgosientsho Ramokgopa	ANC	National
Anthea Ramolobeng	ANC	Gauteng
Tumelo Ramongalo	DA	Gauteng
Visvin Reddy	MK	National
Adrian Roos	DA	National
Lindelwa Sapo	ANC	Eastern Cape
Ashor Sarupen	DA	National
Ashley Sauls	PA	National
Lisa-Maré Schickerling	DA	Northern Cape
Leon Schreiber	DA	National
Albert Seabi	ANC	Limpopo
Olga Seate	ANC	National
Michael Segede	ANC	Northern Cape
Sello Seitlholo	DA	North West
Seaparo Sekoati	ANC	Limpopo
Donald Selamolela	ANC	Limpopo
Hlonono Selepe	MK	Mpumalanga
Masello Senne	ANC	North West
Fisani Shabangu	ANC	Mpumalanga
Lungisani Shangase	MK	National
Nazley Sharif	DA	Gauteng
Maliyakhe Shelembe	DA	National
Mandla Shikwambana	EFF	Limpopo
Crossby Shongwe	MK	Gauteng
Jomo Sibiya	ANC	KwaZulu-Natal
Thembi Simelane	ANC	National
Narend Singh	IFP	National
Shara Singh	DA	National
Jane Sithole	DA	National
Thembi Siweya	ANC	National
David Skosana	MK	National
Gijimani Skosana	ANC	Mpumalanga
Beyers Smit	DA	Limpopo
Ryan Smith	DA	Western Cape
Thokozile Sokanyile	ANC	Eastern Cape
Mzwanele Sokopo	ANC	Western Cape
Nombiselo Sompa-Masiu	ANC	North West
Maggie Sotyu	ANC	Free State
John Steenhuisen	DA	National
Shaik Imraan Subrathie	ANC	KwaZulu-Natal
Steven Swart	ACDP	National
Bernice Swarts	ANC	National
Glen Taaibosch	MK	National
Noluvuyo Tafeni	EFF	Eastern Cape
Parks Tau	ANC	National
Sinawo Thambo	EFF	Gauteng
Albert Themba	MK	Mpumalanga
Sophie Thembekwayo	EFF	Gauteng
Wayne Thring	ACDP	National
Weziwe Tikana-Gxotiwe	ANC	National
Florence Tito	EFF	Northern Cape
Kerileng Tlhong	ANC	North West
Nokuzola Tolashe	ANC	National
Athol Trollip	ActionSA	National
Noble Tshotetsi	ANC	North West
Liezl van der Merwe	IFP	National
Désirée van der Walt	DA	National
Des van Rooyen	MK	National
Philip van Staden	VF+	Gauteng
Saintes van Wyk	PA	National
Marina van Zyl	DA	Eastern Cape
S'bongiseni Vilakazi	DA	National
Kingsley Wakelin	DA	Gauteng
Wouter Wessels	VF+	National
Pretty Xaba-Ntshaba	ANC	Gauteng
Sheilla Xego	ANC	Eastern Cape
Songezo Zibi	RISE	National
Sihle Zikalala	ANC	National
Sphesihle Zondi	DA	KwaZulu-Natal
Sanele Zondo	IFP	KwaZulu-Natal
Brumelda Zuma	MK	National
Vuyolwethu Zungula	ATM	National

== Vacancies and replacements ==
A seat in the National Assembly becomes vacant if the member dies, resigns, ceases to be eligible, ceases to be a member of the party that nominated them, or is elected to the office of President of South Africa. The vacancy is filled from the same party list as the former member.

Party	List	Seat vacated by	Date of vacancy	Reason for vacancy	Replaced by	Date of replacement
MK	National	Mashudu Tshivhase	5 June 2024	Elected but not available	Thalente Kubheka	15 June 2024
MK	National	Jabulani Khumalo	5 June 2024	Ceased to be a member of the party	John Hlophe	15 June 2024
MK	National	Goodwill Kgatle	5 June 2024	Ceased to be a member of the party	Mnqobi Msezane	15 June 2024
MK	National	Lebogang Moepeng	5 June 2024	Ceased to be a member of the party	Khayelihle Madlala	15 June 2024
MK	National	Meshack Tebe	5 June 2024	Ceased to be a member of the party	Andile Mngxitama	15 June 2024
MK	National	Rochelle Davidson	5 June 2024	Ceased to be a member of the party	Glen Taaibosch	15 June 2024
MK	National	Sophonia Tsekede	5 June 2024	Ceased to be a member of the party	Wesley Douglas	15 June 2024
EFF	Free State	Nthako Matiase	5 June 2024	Elected but not available	Fana Mokoena	5 June 2024
EFF	National	Sinawo Thambo	5 June 2024	Elected but not available	Nthako Matiase	5 June 2024
EFF	Eastern Cape	Phindiwe Kaba	5 June 2024	Elected but not available	Noluvuyo Tafeni	5 June 2024
EFF	Eastern Cape	Siyabonga Gida	5 June 2024	Elected but not available	Yoliswa Yako	5 June 2024
EFF	Gauteng	Nqobile Mhlongo	5 June 2024	Elected but not available	Thapelo Mogale	5 June 2024
EFF	Limpopo	Anthony Matumba	5 June 2024	Elected but not available	Lencel Komane	5 June 2024
EFF	Mpumalanga	Khanya Ceza	5 June 2024	Elected but not available	Constance Mkhonto	5 June 2024
EFF	North West	Fikile Oortman	5 June 2024	Elected but not available	Mothusi Montwedi	5 June 2024
EFF	North West	Tebogo Mokwele	5 June 2024	Elected but not available	Betty Diale	5 June 2024
EFF	Western Cape	Virgill Gericke	5 June 2024	Elected but not available	Natasha Ntlangwini	5 June 2024
ActionSA	Gauteng	Solly Moeng	5 June 2024	Elected but not available	Dereleen James	5 June 2024
UDM	Eastern Cape	Lennox Gaehler	5 June 2024	Elected but not available	Christobel Nontenja	5 June 2024
DA	Western Cape	Kobus Marais	5 June 2024	Elected but not available	Katherine Christie	5 June 2024
Al Jama-ah	National	Imraan Moosa	5 June 2024	Ineligible as a member of a municipal council	Shameemah Salie	5 June 2024
MK	National	Mzonke Tomsana	5 June 2024	Elected but not available	Farayi Matsa	3 August 2024
MK	Gauteng	Thabang Nkani	5 June 2024	Elected but not available	Crossby Vusi Shongwe	3 August 2024
MK	KwaZulu-Natal	Thabisile Xaba	5 June 2024	Elected but not available	Thembinkosi Mjadu	23 August 2024
MK	KwaZulu-Natal	Nongcwalisa Khanyile	5 June 2024	Elected but not available	Nompumelelo Gasa	23 August 2024
MK	Mpumalanga	Hamilton Motaung	5 June 2024	Elected but not available	Mzwanele Manyi	23 August 2024
ANC	National	Cyril Ramaphosa	14 June 2024	Elected President of South Africa	Parks Tau	14 June 2024
ANC	National	Bejani Chauke	18 June 2024	Resigned	Sonto Motaung	8 August 2024
EFF	Eastern Cape	Yoliswa Yako	10 July 2024	Resigned	Eugene Mthethwa	23 July 2024
ANC	Mpumalanga	Tim Mashele	19 July 2024	Resigned	Vusumuzi Nkosi	8 August 2024
ANC	National	Zizi Kodwa	24 July 2024	Resigned	Olga Seate	8 August 2024
MK	National	Senzo Dlamini	7 August 2024	Ceased to be a member of the party	Gift Motaung	12 June 2025
MK	KwaZulu-Natal	Nompumelelo Gasa	7 August 2024	Ceased to be a member of the party	Brian Molefe	23 August 2024
MK	KwaZulu-Natal	Thamsanqa Khuzwayo	7 August 2024	Ceased to be a member of the party	Adil Nchabeleng	17 January 2025
MK	Gauteng	Sydwell Masilela	7 August 2024	Ceased to be a member of the party	Khanyisile Litchfield-Tshabalala	12 June 2025
MK	National	Isaac Menyatso	7 August 2024	Ceased to be a member of the party	Zibuse Cele	12 June 2025
MK	National	France Mfiki	7 August 2024	Ceased to be a member of the party	Lungisani Shangase	12 June 2025
MK	National	Nomado Mgwebi	7 August 2024	Ceased to be a member of the party	Noma Buthelezi	12 June 2025
MK	KwaZulu-Natal	Thembinkosi Mjadu	7 August 2024	Ceased to be a member of the party	Siyabonga Gama	23 August 2024
MK	KwaZulu-Natal	Ntombenhle Mkhize	7 August 2024	Ceased to be a member of the party	Colleen Makhubele	17 January 2025
MK	National	Garatwe Mogotsi	7 August 2024	Ceased to be a member of the party	Philasande Mkhize	12 June 2025
MK	National	Citron Motshegoe	7 August 2024	Ceased to be a member of the party	Jeffrey Mtolo	12 June 2025
MK	National	Augastina Qwetha	7 August 2024	Ceased to be a member of the party	Siphetho Mkhize	12 June 2025
MK	KwaZulu-Natal	Shaggy Radebe	7 August 2024	Ceased to be a member of the party	Lucky Montana	23 August 2024
MK	KwaZulu-Natal	Lungisani Shangase	7 August 2024	Ceased to be a member of the party	Thulani Gamede	23 August 2024
MK	KwaZulu-Natal	Sifiso Zungu	7 August 2024	Ceased to be a member of the party	Eric Kobane	23 August 2024
EFF	Gauteng	Mzwanele Manyi	12 August 2024	Resigned to join uMkhonto weSizwe	Sinawo Thambo	27 August 2024
EFF	Gauteng	Floyd Shivambu	16 August 2024	Resigned to join uMkhonto weSizwe	Nazier Paulsen	27 August 2024
DA	Eastern Cape	Renaldo Gouws	30 September 2024	Ceased to be a member of the party	Fezeka Mbiko	7 October 2024
EFF	Mpumalanga	Busisiwe Mkhwebane	15 October 2024	Resigned to join uMkhonto weSizwe	Sihle Lonzi	5 November 2024
EFF	Free State	Fana Mokoena	15 October 2024	Resigned	Tebogo Mokwele	5 November 2024
IFP	KwaZulu-Natal	Sbuyiselwe Angela Buthelezi	21 October 2024	Died	Thokozani Langa	28 November 2024
PA	Western Cape	Katrina De Bruin	23 October 2024	Resigned	Raatiqah Tagodien	25 November 2024
PA	National	Cleo Wilskut	23 October 2024	Resigned	Saintes van Wyk	11 November 2024
PA	National	Stacey-Lee Khojane	1 November 2024	Resigned	Lorato Mathopa	11 November 2024
PA	Eastern Cape	Gavin Jonas	1 November 2024	Resigned	Marlon Daniels	11 November 2024
ANC	Northern Cape	Martha Bartlett	27 November 2024	Resigned	Michael Segede	4 December 2024
EFF	National	Yazini Tetyana	7 January 2025	Resigned	Chumani Matiwane	5 February 2025
EFF	Gauteng	Ntokozo Hlonyana	8 January 2025	Resigned	Naledi Chirwa	11 June 2025
EFF	National	Mbuyiseni Ndlozi	10 January 2025	Resigned	Nqobile Mhlongo	5 February 2025
MK	National	Farayi Matsa	15 May 2025	Absent without authorisation for 15 or more sitting days of the Assembly	Nkosentsha Shezi	12 June 2025
ANC	National	Lungi Mnganga-Gcabashe	17 May 2025	Died	Sisipho Jama	11 June 2025
IFP	Gauteng	Petros Sithole	31 May 2025	Died	Alco Ngobese	16 September 2025
Al Jama-ah	National	Shameemah Salie	5 June 2025	Resigned	Imraan Moosa	6 June 2025
PA	Western Cape	Raatiqah Tagodien	12 June 2025	Resigned	Ernest Hendricks	12 June 2025
PA	Western Cape	Evangeline Freeman	12 June 2025	Resigned	Sheila Peters	12 June 2025
PA	National	Filicity Rorke	12 June 2025	Resigned	Juliet Basson	12 June 2025
DA	Gauteng	Liam Jacobs	18 June 2025	Ceased to be a member of the party	Nazley Sharif	23 June 2025
EFF	North West	Mothusi Montwedi	15 July 2025	Resigned	Laetitia Arries	16 July 2025
EFF	National	Marshall Dlamini	31 August 2025	Resigned	Muzi Khoza	8 September 2025
MK	KwaZulu-Natal	Nompumelelo Gasa	3 September 2025	Resigned	Pumlani Kubukeli	3 December 2025
ANC	KwaZulu-Natal	Sibongiseni Dhlomo	30 September 2025	Resigned	Dipuo Ntuli	7 November 2025
MK	National	Duduzile Zuma-Sambudla	28 November 2025	Resigned	Brumelda Zuma	3 December 2025
MK	National	Lucky Montana	1 December 2025	Resigned	Makhosazana Radebe	3 December 2025
MK	National	Mabel Rweqana	2 December 2025	Resigned	Bongani Mkongi	3 December 2025
DA	National	Dion George	22 January 2026	Ceased to be a member of the party	Matlhodi Maseko	30 June 2026
MK	National	Brian Molefe	6 February 2026	Resigned	Mmabatho Mokoena-Zondi	13 February 2026
ANC	National	Tsakani Shiviti	13 February 2026	Resigned	Zama Khanyase	24 February 2026
MK	KwaZulu-Natal	Colleen Makhubele	10 March 2026	Ceased to be a member of the party	Sithembile Nkosi	10 March 2026
MK	National	Nkosentsha Shezi	23 March 2026	Died	Sizwe Mlotshwa	6 July 2026
MK	KwaZulu-Natal	Eric Kobane	25 May 2026	Resigned	Irvin Mogale	22 July 2026
MK	National	Edward Ntshingila	4 June 2026	Died	Wiseman Ngobese	6 July 2026
EFF	Mpumalanga	Constance Mkhonto	20 June 2026	Resigned		
DA	Western Cape	Matlhodi Maseko	29 June 2026	Took up seat on National list	David Maynier	30 June 2026
DA	Eastern Cape	Kevin Mileham	29 June 2026	Took up seat on National list	Yusuf Cassim	30 June 2026
DA	National	Andrew Whitfield	29 June 2026	Resigned	Kevin Mileham	30 June 2026
DA	Gauteng	Toby Chance	30 June 2026	Took up seat on National list	Jack Bloom	1 July 2026
DA	Gauteng	Mathew Cuthbert	30 June 2026	Resigned	Toby Chance	1 July 2026
PA	Gauteng	Jasmine Petersen	1 July 2026	Resigned	Theresa Jeyi	8 July 2026
MK	National	Nhlamulo Ndhlela	6 July 2026	Ceased to be a member of the party		
MK	Gauteng	Khanyisile Litchfield-Tshabalala	16 October 2026	Ceased to be a member of the party		
MK	KwaZulu-Natal	Pumlani Kubukeli	16 October 2026	Ceased to be a member of the party		
