= Standing Committee on Finance (South Africa) =

Standing committee in the National Assembly of South Africa

The Standing Committee on Finance is a standing committee in the National Assembly of the Parliament of South Africa.

== Mandate ==
The committee oversees the National Treasury and statutory entities, including the Accounting Standards Board, the Co-operative Banks Development Agency, the Development Bank of Southern Africa (DBSA), the Office of the Ombud for Financial Services Providers, the Financial Intelligence Centre (FIC), the Financial and Fiscal Commission, the Financial Sector Conduct Authority, the Government Pensions Administration Agency (GPAA), the Government Technical Advisory Centre, the Independent Regulatory Board for Auditors (IRBA), the Land and Agricultural Development Bank of South Africa, the Office of the Pension Funds Adjudicator, the Public Investment Corporation (PIC), the South African Special Risk Insurance Association (SASRIA), the South African Revenue Service (SARS), the South African Reserve Bank (SARB) and the Office of the Tax Ombud.

== Membership ==
After the 2024 general election, the committee's members are as follows:

Member	Party
Joe Maswanganyi MP (Chairperson)	African National Congress
Wendy Alexander MP	Democratic Alliance
Andrew Bateman MP	Democratic Alliance
Alan Beesley MP	ActionSA
Wesley Marshall Douglas MP	uMkhonto weSizwe
Nonceba Gcaleka-Mazibuko MP	African National Congress
Nhalanhla Hadebe MP	Inkatha Freedom Party
Molapi Lekganyane MP	Economic Freedom Fighters
Seaparo Sekoati MP	African National Congress
Nyiko Shivambu MP	Economic Freedom Fighters
Des Van Rooyen MP	uMkhonto weSizwe

The following people serve as alternate members:

Alternate Member	Party
Mark John Burke MP	Democratic Alliance (South Africa)
Sakiena Frenchman MP	National Coloured Congress
Mzwanele Manyi MP	Economic Freedom Fighters
Steven Swart MP	African Christian Democratic Party

== See also ==
- Committees of the Parliament of South Africa
