= Standing Committee on Public Accounts =

Standing committee of the South African National Assembly

The Standing Committee on Public Accounts (SCOPA; Afrikaans: Staande Komitee oor Openbare Rekeninge) is a standing committee of the National Assembly of South Africa, the lower house of the Parliament of South Africa. It oversees the financial statements of all government departments and state institutions, any audit reports issued on those statements, reports compiled by the Auditor-General on government departments and state institutions, as well as any other financial statements or reports referred to by the committee.

== Independence of the Chair ==
From 1994 until 2024 the practice has been that Parliament elects an opposition party member as chairperson. African People's Convention's Themba Godi, who was the SCOPA chair for 15 years, in 2022 said about the party affiliation of the chair:

“Having an opposition member leading Scopa has obvious advantages. The chair is not immediately constrained by narrow party considerations, especially the instinct to defend or avoid embarrassing their own party’s minister. It also makes officials’ work more difficult in preparing for meetings, in the knowledge that the chair will not instinctively be inclined to cover up a bit for them. An opposition chair is immune from the internal party backlash and is readily available to communicate messages to the public via the media.”

In July 2024 the South African Parliament elected Songezi Zibi from Rise Mzansi, a member of the Government of National Unity (NGU) as chairperson. ActionSA, an opposition party that has not joined the GNU, criticised his election saying that the position has been "gifted to a member of the multi-party government/'GNU' which already commands a 70% majority in Parliament [which] serves to potentially neuter effective oversight over government expenditure and outcomes related performance. ... Strong government needs a counter balancing force in opposition that uses the considerable powers afforded to a SCOPA Chairperson to hold government to account."

Zibi responded: “I think people are mischaracterising the tradition ... The tradition is that the chair of Scopa is not from the majority party. [Rise Mzansi is] not even in the national Cabinet, so the conflict doesn’t arise.”

== Membership ==
The membership of the committee is as follows:

Party	Member	Position	Since
RISE	Songezo Zibi	Chairperson	2024
ActionSA	Alan Beesley	Member	2024
ANC	Tintswalo Bila	Member	2024
DA	Patrick Atkinson	Member	2024
DA	Farhat Essack	Member	2024
ANC	Helen Neale-May	Member	2024
MK	TTS Kubheka	Member	2024
ANC	Ntando Maduna	Member	2024
EFF	Veronica Mente-Nkuna	Member	2019
MK	David Mandla Skosana	Member	2024
UDM	Christobel Thandiwe Nontenja	Alternate	2024
EFF	Mazwikayise Brian Blose	Alternate	2024
DA	Kingsley Wakelin	Alternate	2024

== List of chairpersons ==
It is customary for a member of an opposition party to serve as chairperson of the committee. However, in 2024 Songezi Zibi, the leader of Rise Mzansi, a member of the GNU, was elected chairperson.

Chairperson	Party	Term start	Term end
Ken Andrew	Democratic Party	1994	1999
Gavin Woods	Inkatha Freedom Party	1999	2002
Francois Beukman	New National Party	2002	2005
Themba Godi	Pan Africanist Congress	2005	2007
Themba Godi	African People's Convention	2007	2019
Mkhuleko Hlengwa	Inkatha Freedom Party	2019	2024
Songezo Zibi	Rise Mzansi	2024	Incumbent
