= Motaung =

Motaung is an African surname that may refer to

- Anastasia Motaung, South African politician
- Gift Motaung, South African politician
- Kaizer Motaung (born 1944), South African football player
- Kaizer Motaung Junior (born 1981), South African football striker
- Oziel Hlalele Motaung, member of the Pan-African Parliament from Lesotho
- Sizwe Motaung (1970–2001), South African football player
- Tshepo Motaung (born 1999), South African cricketer
