= Makhosazana =

Makhosazana is a given name.

== People with the given name ==
- Makhosazana Dlomo, South African equestrian
- Makhosazana Mdlalose, South African politician
- Makhosazana Abigail Alicia Njobe, South African politician
- Makhosazana Radebe, South African politician
- Makhosazana Xaba, South African poet

== See also ==
- Makhosaza Twala
