= Thulani =

Thulani (meaning: the quiet one) is a South African given name. Notable people with the name include:

- Thulani Davis (born 1949), American playwright, journalist, librettist, novelist, poet, and screenwriter
- Thulani Gamede, South African politician
- Thulani Hlatshwayo (born 1989), South African football defender
- Thulani Malinga (born 1955), South African professional boxer
- Thulani Maseko, Swaziland human rights lawyer
- Thulani Ngcepe (born 1990), South African football striker
- Thulani Serero (born 1990), South African football midfielder
- Thulani Shabalala (born 1968), South African singer
