= Thalente =

Thalente is a given name. Notable people with the given name include:

- Thalente Kubheka (fl. from 2024), South African politician
- Thalente Mbatha (born 2000), South African soccer player

== See also ==
- Thaletas
