= Mbele =

Mbele is a surname. Notable people with the surname include:

- Diosdado Mbele (born 1997), Equatoguinean footballer
- Hazel Mbele, South African politician
- Lelo Mbele (born 1987), Congolese footballer
- Lerato Mbele, South African broadcast journalist
- Sonia Mbele, South African actress
