= Chumani =

Chumani is a given name.

== Origins ==
=== Native America ===
It is derived from the Lakota language, meaning dewdrop ("chue" dew and "mani" walk )

=== South Africa ===
It has roots in the Xhosa Language from the word "chumana" which means "to encounter".

== Usage ==
=== Notable people with the name include ===
- Chumani Booi (born 1980), South African rugby union player and coach
- Chumani Butsaka (born 2001), South African soccer player
- Chumani Matiwane, South African politician
- Chumani Maxwele (born 1985), South African political activist
- Chumani Pan (born 1985), South African actor
