= Wesley Douglas =

Wesley Douglas may refer to:

- Wesley Douglas (footballer), Brazilian footballer
- Wesley Douglas (politician), South African politician
