= Zwelakhe =

Zwelakhe is a masculine given name. Notable people with the name include:

- Zwelakhe Mthethwa (fl. from 2024), South African politician
- Zwelakhe Sisulu (1950–2012), South African journalist

== See also ==
- Zwevegem
