= Zibuse =

Zibuse is a given name. Notable people with the name include:

- Zibuse Cele (fl. 2024), South African politician
- Zibuse Mlaba (1955–2021), South African politician

== See also ==
- Zebu
