= Nicole van Dyk =

Nicole van Dyk MPL

Member of the Gauteng Provincial Legislature
- Incumbent
- Assumed office 27 January 2025

Personal details
- Born: 18 December 1985 (age 40) Roodepoort, Johannesburg, Gauteng, South Africa
- Party: Democratic Alliance
- Other party: Congress of the People
- Education: Northcliff High School
- Alma mater: University of Johannesburg (BA)
- Profession: Politician

Nicola Janita van Dyk (born 18 December 1985) is a South African politician and a Member of the Gauteng Provincial Legislature for the Democratic Alliance since January 2025. She previously served as the ward councillor for ward 99 in the City of Johannesburg.

== Early life and education ==
Van Dyk was born on 18 December 1985 in Roodepoort, outside Johannesburg. She matriculated from Northcliff High School in 2003 and went on to study a Bachelor of Arts in Humanities, majoring in Political Science and History, at the University of Johannesburg.

== Political career ==
Van Dyk found employment as a political aide to the chief whip of the Congress of the People caucus in the City of Johannesburg at the age of 25, a post she would hold for two years.

In 2013, Van Dyk graduated from the Democratic Alliance's Young Leaders Programme and subsequently became a staffer for the party. She was elected the DA ward councillor for ward 99 centred around Linden in the City of Johannesburg in the 2016 municipal election.

In March 2020, Van Dyk was named the Shadow Member of the Mayoral Committee for Environment and Infrastructure Services by the DA caucus leader in the Johannesburg metro, Leah Knott.

Van Dyk was re-elected as the ward councillor for ward 99 in the 2021 municipal election.

In January 2025, Van Dyk resigned from the Johannesburg City Council as she was appointed to the Gauteng Provincial Legislature. She was sworn in on 27 January 2025, filling a casual vacancy that arose. She is the DA's spokesperson on transport in the legislature. In 2026, she delivered a speech during the debate on Premier Panyaza Lesufi's State of the Province Address.
