= Ntando =

Ntando is a given name. Notable people with the given name include:

- Ntando Kebe (born 1988), South African rugby union player
- Ntando Maduna (born 1992), South African politician
- Ntando Emmanuel Magubane (fl. 1999–2014), South African politician
- Ntando Mahlangu (born 2002), South African Paralympic athlete
- Ntando Mncube (born 1986), South African actor, singer, and dancer
- Ntando Phahla (born 2006), South African soccer player
- Ntando Rambani née Duma (born 1995), South African actress, television personality, and model
