= Oziel =

Oziel is a given name. Notable people with the name include:

- Oziel França da Silva (born 1984), Brazilian football player
- Oziel Hlalele Motaung, member of the Pan-African Parliament from Lesotho
