= Nicolai Lomov =

Russian classical pianist (1946–2020)

Nicolai Lomov (February 9, 1946 – July 24, 2020) was a Russian classical pianist, who played with the Moscow Philharmonic Orchestra and the Leningrad Philharmonic Orchestra before emigrating to the United States.

== Biography ==
Nicolai Lomov began playing piano at the age of three. At five, he was enrolled at the Mussorgsky State School for Gifted Children. Lomov made his musical debut with the Ekaterinburg Philharmonic Orchestra, playing Tchaikovsky's Concerto in B-flat minor, Op. 23, at 15.

His formative training took place at the Moscow Tchaikovsky State Conservatory, completing his Ph.D. in 1971. In 1990, leaving behind a teaching position at the Saint Petersburg Conservatory, he emigrated to the United States. Seven months later, he found himself in Boston, working as a dishwasher in the Federal Reserve Bank's sixth floor kitchen, while also teaching classes in piano. The documentary Nicolai Lomov, Russian Pianist and American Dishwasher chronicles this story. After being "discovered" while working as a dishwasher, Lomov made his professional US stage debut with the Newton Symphony in Newton, Massachusetts, in 1992. From 1992 until 1996, Lomov was a soloist with the Newton Symphony Orchestra as well as the New Hampshire Philharmonic.

Lomov has performed over 60 recitals in the eastern United States as well as Oklahoma. He taught young pianists in the Rhode Island and New England area. His students have included the pianists Marlon Daniels, Daniel Wnukowski, and Robert Laniewski.

Lomov died on July 24, 2020, at the age of 74 after complications from a stroke.

== Recordings ==
- Lomov, N. (1993), The Lark (Music CD), Massachusetts : [s.n.], OCLC 46680522
