= Khayelihle =

Khayelihle is a given name. Notable people with the name include:

- Khayelihle Madlala (fl. from 2024), South African politician
- Khayelihle Mathaba (died 2014), South African royal and politician
- Khayelihle Mthiyane (1944–2021), South African jurist and judge
- Khayelihle Shozi (born 1994), South African footballer
- Khayelihle Zondo (born 1990), South African cricketer

== See also ==
- Khayelitsha
