= Dipuo =

Dipuo is a feminine given name. Notable people with the name include:

- Dipuo Ntuli (fl. from 2024), South African politician
- Dipuo Letsatsi-Duba (born 1965), South African politician
- Dipuo Peters (born 1960), South African politician

== See also ==
- Dipo
