= Gcwabaza =

Gcwabaza is a surname. Notable people with the surname include:

- Ndaba Gcwabaza (born 1954), South African politician
- Nhlanhla Gcwabaza (fl. from 2024), South African politician

== See also ==
- Gora Bazar
