= Sixolise Gcilishe =

South African politician

Member of the National Assembly of South Africa
- Incumbent
- Assumed office 2024
- Constituency: Gauteng

Personal details
- Party: Economic Freedom Fighters

Sixolisa Gcilishe is a South African politician and a member of Parliament (MP) for the Economic Freedom Fighters (EFF). She was elected to the National Assembly of South Africa in the 2024 South African general election. She was previously the party's election spokesperson.

== See also ==
- List of National Assembly members of the 28th Parliament of South Africa
