= Raatiqah Tagodien =

South African politician

Member of the National Assembly of South Africa
- In office 25 November 2024 – 12 June 2025
- Preceded by: Katrina De Bruin
- Constituency: National

Personal details
- Party: Patriotic Alliance
- Profession: Community activist

Raatiqah Tagodien is a South African politician and community activist who served as a Member of the National Assembly of South Africa from November 2024 until June 2025, representing the Patriotic Alliance.

== Background ==
Tagodien is a community activist based in Pelican Park on the Cape Flats in Cape Town. She served as the vice chairperson of the school governing body of Blomvlei Primary School in Hanover Park. She unsuccessfully stood as the Patriotic Alliance's ward councillor candidate in Ward 67 in the City of Cape Town during the 2016 municipal elections and the 2021 municipal elections. She was sworn in as a Patriotic Alliance councillor in November 2023.

== Parliamentary career ==
In October 2024, the Patriotic Alliance reshuffled its parliamentary caucus which saw four members of parliament resign to make way for other party members to take up their seats. Tagodien was selected to become a member of parliament. She was sworn into office on 25 November 2024. She resigned from parliament on 12 June 2025.

== Personal life ==
Tagodien is a Muslim.
