= Christobel Nontenja =

South African politician and businesswoman (b. 1956)

Christobel Nontenja MP

Member of the National Assembly of South Africa
- Incumbent
- Assumed office 14 June 2024
- Preceded by: Lennox Gaehler
- Constituency: Eastern Cape

Personal details
- Born: 3 February 1956 (age 70)
- Party: United Democratic Movement
- Profession: Businesswoman, politician

Christobel Thandiwe Nontenja (born 3 February 1956) is a South African politician and businesswoman who has been a Member of the National Assembly of South Africa since 2024, representing the United Democratic Movement, of which she serves as the national treasurer. She was previously a City of Johannesburg councilor.

== Early life and career ==
Nontenja grew up in Mount Frere and attended Colana High School from which she matriculated. She has diplomas in bookkeeping, accounting, business management, and political leadership. She found employment in the business sector before she became involved in politics.

== Political career ==
Nontenja was elected an UDM councillor in the City of Johannesburg in the 2006 local elections. She was reelected in 2011, 2016, and again in 2021. During her time on the council, she chaired the Standing Committee on Public Accounts for many years.

Following the 2024 national and provincial elections, Lennox Gaehler was not available to serve as an UDM member of parliament in the National Assembly. Nontenja, as the next candidate on the party list, was selected to take up his seat. She is a member of the Standing Committee on Public Accounts and the Portfolio Committee on Defence and Military Veterans. Nontenja is also the UDM's chief whip.
