= Sphesihle Zondi =

South African politician (born 1995)

Sphesihle Zondi MP

Member of the National Assembly of South Africa
- Incumbent
- Assumed office 14 June 2024

Personal details
- Born: 17 November 1994 (age 31)
- Party: Democratic Alliance
- Profession: Politician

Sphesihle Zondi (born 17 November 1994) is a South African politician and a Member of Parliament (MP) for the Democratic Alliance (DA). He was elected to the National Assembly of South Africa in the 2024 South African general election, where he was 69th on the national party list. DASO former national chairperson

== Early life ==
Zondi grew up as an orphan in the township of Sweetwater.

== Career ==
Zondi was a councillor in uMngeni Municipality.

== See also ==
- List of National Assembly members of the 28th Parliament of South Africa
