= Saintes van Wyk =

South African politician

Saintes van Wyk MP

Member of the National Assembly of South Africa
- Incumbent
- Assumed office 27 November 2024
- Preceded by: Cleo Wilskut

Personal details
- Born: Saintes Harry Mclove Van Wyk
- Party: Patriotic Alliance
- Profession: Politician

Saintes Harry Mclove Van Wyk is a South African politician from the Free State who has been a Member of the National Assembly of South Africa since November 2024, representing the Patriotic Alliance, of which he serves as the party's traditional affairs leader.

In February 2025, Van Wyk, a Khoisan Member of Parliament, emphasised the need for Khoisan to be recognised as Africans.
