= Yanga Govana =

South African politician

Yanga Govana is a South African politician from the African National Congress. She was elected to the Parliament of South Africa in 2024.

== See also ==
- List of National Assembly members of the 28th Parliament of South Africa
