= Elmarie Linde =

South African politician

Member of the National Assembly of South Africa
- Incumbent
- Assumed office 14 June 2024

Personal details
- Born: 9 January 1971 (age 55)
- Party: Democratic Alliance

Elmarie Linde (born 9 January 1971) is a South African politician and a Member of Parliament (MP) for the Democratic Alliance (DA).

She was elected to the National Assembly of South Africa in the 2024 South African general election, where she was 61st on the national party list.

== See also ==
- List of National Assembly members of the 28th Parliament of South Africa
