= Eldorado Park, Gauteng =

Eldorado Park
- Location within Gauteng Location within South Africa
- Coordinates: 26.289°S 27.896°E
- Country: South Africa
- Province: Gauteng
- Municipality: City of Johannesburg
- Main Place: Soweto
- Established: 1965

Area
  - Total: 9.12 km^{2} (3.52 sq mi)

Population (2011)
  - Total: 65,698
  - Density: 7,200/km^{2} (18,700/sq mi)

Racial makeup (2011)
  - Black African: 12.37%
  - Coloured: 85.06%
  - Indian/Asian: 1.13%
  - White: 0.18%
  - Other: 1.26%

First languages (2011)
  - Afrikaans: 56.9%
  - English: 35.7%
  - Zulu: 1.6%
  - Northern Sotho: 1.6%
  - Setswana: 1.3%
- Time zone: UTC+2 (SAST)
- Postal code (street): 1811
- PO box: 1813

Eldorado Park is a suburb of Soweto, Johannesburg, South Africa. It is located in Region G of the City of Johannesburg Metropolitan Municipality. It lies on the southern boundary of Soweto and prior to 1994, was a Coloured township during Apartheid.

== History ==
In 1965, the land was declared an area for the exclusive settlement of the Coloured South Africans under the Group Areas Act. It became part of Johannesburg in 1970.

== Notable people ==
- Dereleen James, ActionSA Member of Parliament and community activist
- Liesl Laurie - Miss South Africa 2015
- Liesl Penniken - singer, most famously as a member of Jamali (band)
