= Betty Diale =

South African politician

Member of the National Assembly of South Africa
- Incumbent
- Assumed office 2024

Personal details
- Party: Economic Freedom Fighters

Betty Kedisaletse Diale is a South African politician and a member of Parliament (MP) for the Economic Freedom Fighters (EFF). She was elected to the National Assembly of South Africa in the 2024 South African general election. She is a former member of the North West Provincial Legislature. She is a former attorney.

== See also ==
- List of National Assembly members of the 28th Parliament of South Africa
