= Jeffrey Mtolo =

South African politician

Member of the National Assembly of South Africa
- Incumbent
- Assumed office 2025

Personal details
- Party: uMkhonto weSizwe Party

Jeffrey Bhekumndeni Mtolo is a South African politician and a member of Parliament (MP) for the uMkhonto weSizwe Party (MK).

== See also ==
- List of National Assembly members of the 28th Parliament of South Africa
