= Brumelda Zuma =

South African politician

Member of the National Assembly of South Africa
- Incumbent
- Assumed office 10 December 2025

Personal details
- Party: uMkhonto weSizwe Party
- Parent: Jacob Zuma

Brumelda Zuma is a South African politician and a member of Parliament (MP) for the uMkhonto weSizwe Party (MK). Her father is former president Jacob Zuma.

== See also ==
- List of National Assembly members of the 28th Parliament of South Africa
