= Sithembile Nkosi =

South African politician

Sithembile Nkosi MP

Member of the National Assembly of South Africa
- Incumbent
- Assumed office 10 March 2026
- Preceded by: Colleen Makhubele

Personal details
- Party: uMkhonto weSizwe Party

Sithembile Nkosi is a South African politician who is a Member of Parliament (MP) for the uMkhonto weSizwe Party (MK). She replaced Colleen Makhubele in 2026. She was MKYL Secretary General.

== See also ==
- List of National Assembly members of the 28th Parliament of South Africa
