= Zelna Abader =

South African politician

Zelna Abader MP

Member of the National Assembly of South Africa
- Incumbent
- Assumed office 25 June 2024
- Constituency: Gauteng

Personal details
- Party: uMkhonto weSizwe

Zelna Saira Abader is a South African politician who serves in the National Assembly of South Africa for the Gauteng constituency as a member of uMkhonto weSizwe.

== Personal life ==
Zelna Saira Abader is a Muslim.

== Career ==
In the 2024 general election Abader was elected as part of uMkhonto weSizwe's regional list for the Gauteng constituency. uMkhonto weSizwe placed fourth in Gauteng, behind the African National Congress, Democratic Alliance, and Economic Freedom Fighters, winning five seats in the National Assembly of South Africa.

During Abadner's tenure in the National Assembly she has served on the Portfolio Committee on Human Settlements. She is one of two Muslims women in the uMkhonto weSizwe's caucus and is a portfolio committee of uMkhonto weSizwe. She deputized Wesley Douglas as a whip for thePeace and Security Cluster of uMkhonto weSizwe.

== Political positions ==
Abader has defended the persecution of Uyghurs in China and stated that thousands of Uyghurs have joined the Islamic State. She has been critical of Minister of Human Settlements Thembi Simelane's handling of housing projects, housing projects that were blocked, and allegations of corruption.

Abader stated that uMkhonto weSizwe is not a Zulu nationalist party and that is appeals to people of different backgrounds. She cited Jacob Zuma's head of security reading the Al-Fatiha and An-Nasr of the Quran at a party meeting in Bela-Bela as an example of its diversity. uMkhonto weSizwe was also noted to have received a significant amount of the vote in Gauteng, which has a small Zulu population.

== Works cited ==
=== News ===
- "MK Party Makes Several New Changes In Parliamentary Whippery". Salaamedia. 18 March 2025. Archived from the original on 20 June 2025.
- Gerber, Jan (16 November 2024). "MKP defends China's oppression of Uyghurs, aligns with Russian foreign policy". News24.
- Jadwat, Zahid (8 August 2024). "'Where's the Zulu traditionalist?' asks MK's Abader". Salaamedia. Archived from the original on 19 June 2025.
- Manjeya, Yamkeleka (28 May 2025). "R36 million vanished yet the same contractors remain – Simelane grilled over dodgy, incomplete housing projects". News24.
- Riddle, Samantha (6 February 2025). "SONA 2025: MK claims judiciary blocked Zuma's attendance". The South African. Archived from the original on 20 June 2025.

=== Web ===
- "Detailed Results of the 2024 election in Gauteng" (PDF). Electoral Commission of South Africa. Archived from the original (PDF) on 20 June 2025.
- "Ms Zelna Saira Abader". Parliament of South Africa. Archived from the original on 3 November 2024.
- "Portfolio Committee on Human Settlements". Parliament of South Africa. Archived from the original on 19 June 2025.
