= Katherine Christie =

South African politician

Member of the National Assembly of South Africa
- Incumbent
- Assumed office 14 June 2024

Personal details
- Party: Democratic Alliance

Katherine Alexandra Christie is a South African politician and a Member of Parliament (MP) for the Democratic Alliance (DA).

Christie is an active supporter of the State of Israel and their operations in the Gaza strip.

Christie was a member of Cape Town City Council for 30 months.

She was elected to the National Assembly of South Africa in the 2024 South African general election, where she was 66th on the national party list.

== See also ==
- List of National Assembly members of the 28th Parliament of South Africa
