= Brian Molefe =

South African politician and businessman

Member of the National Assembly of South Africa
- In office 21 August 2024 – 6 February 2026
- Succeeded by: Mmabatho Mokoena-Zondi

Brian Molefe is a South African businessman and business executive.

He was elected as a member of the National Assembly, representing the UMkhonto we Sizwe, in the 2024 South African general election.

Molefe rose to prominence during his tenure as the CEO of the Public Investment Corporation, heading the secretariat as CEO at the beginning of the corporatisation of the PIC in 2003 through 2010, leaving the organisation with assets under management of R900bn at the expiry of this contract. He was previously a political activist and politician. He is best known for his roles as the CEO of the Public Investment Corporation (2003 –2010), CEO of Transnet (2010 –2015) and Eskom (2015 –2016).

On 29 August 2022, Molefe was arrested on corruption charges linked to a R93-million corruption and fraud case into the purchase of locomotives for Transnet. On 30 june 2025 Brain Molefe and Siyabonga Gama they both been arrested again over Transnet saga.

== Career ==
Molefe was involved in political activism between 1985 and 1994, when he joined First National Bank. The same year he joined the Development Bank of Southern Africa. Between 1997 and 2003 he assumed a number of senior positions within the National Treasury most notably as a DDG (Deputy Director-General), including work on intergovernmental relations and asset management.

During his tenure as the CEO of the Public Investment Corporation from 2003 to 2008, he oversaw a growth in assets under management from R300bn to R900bn. He introduced shareholder activism at the PIC and advocated for the transformation of the South African Corporate sector to be more inclusive and representative of indigenous South Africans who had suffered under the policy of apartheid.

He has also held the position of Deputy Director General in the National Treasury responsible for Assets and Liabilities Management. In this position, he was responsible for, amongst others, the management of sovereign debt. He oversaw a fundamental restructuring of South Africa's domestic and foreign debt portfolio between 2000 and 2003.

Molefe was appointed as the CEO of Transnet in February 2011, He oversaw the implementation of the market demand strategy which resulted in improved rail and port operations, which led to profitability during the 2013/2014 financial year.

In 2015, he was appointed CEO of Eskom to address loadshedding. He managed to temporarily end loadshedding, which did not recur until 2018. However, these reductions in loadshedding are partly attributable to decreased demand, due to weakness in the economy; prior investment coming online; and increased financial support from the state. In November 2016, Molefe resigned as CEO of Eskom effective January 2017.

On resigning, Molefe became further embroiled in controversy when he was illegally awarded a large pension fund payout by the Eskom pension fund. The Gauteng North High Court ordered Molefe to repay an amount of R10.3m, which he was not entitled to as per a retirement agreement. He unsuccessfully appealed this ruling to the Constitutional Court. The Eskom Pension Fund launched a court application in which it sought to have the R10.3m judgment enforced.

In January 2017 Molefe was sworn in as a member of Parliament, but he resigned, effective, by 14 May 2017. He left to return to the role of CEO at Eskom, but Lynne Brown, the Public Enterprises Minister, rescinded the reappointment.

In 2017 Molefe was briefly and controversially appointed as a Colonel in the South African Army Reserves. Former transnet executives Brain molefe and Siyabonga Gama were sworn in as MPs for Jacob Zuma’s uMkhonto weSizwe (MK) party, along with his longtime associate Mzwanele Manyi and former Prasa chief executive Lucky Montana.

== Prosecution ==
On 3 August 2020 Eskom and the SIU jointly issued summons against Brian Molefe in a bid to reclaim R3.8 billion. Molefe raised no less than 30 exceptions to Eskom's plea. The matter is still to be heard by the North Gauteng High Court.

On 4 January 2022, Part 1 of the Zondo Commission Report was published, and recommended that Molefe be investigated further. This after the previous public protector (Thuli Madonsela) and a parliamentary enquiry had made a similar recommendation. In Part 2 Volume 1 of the Zondo Commission Report, Molefe is identified as one of the “primary architects and implementers of State Capture at Transnet” during his tenure as CEO of Transnet. The report found that Molefe "facilitated the conclusion of irregular contracts at inflated prices, variously through deviations, improper confinements and the changing of tender evaluation criteria, in order to facilitate entry for companies involved in the extensive money laundering scheme" to the advantage of Gupta companies.

The fourth part of the Zondo Commission report, released on 29 April 2022, recommended that Molefe be criminally prosecuted for his alleged involvement in corruption. Molefe was arrested on 29 August. Former eskom CEO Brian Molefe is in a stand up committee meeting

On 27 June 2025, Molefe handed himself in to the police regarding a R93 million purchase of locomotives for Transnet during his time as a CEO there.

== Educational qualifications ==
- University of South Africa (South Africa) – Bachelor of Commerce
- University of London (United Kingdom) – Postgraduate Diploma – Economics
- University of South Africa (South Africa) – Masters – Business Leadership
- Harvard Business School (Boston, United States of America – completed 2006) – Advanced Management Program

== Awards ==
- Institutional Investor for the year (2008) – Awarded by Africa Investor Investments Awards
- Empowerment Leadership Award (2007) – Awarded by Wits Business School/Barloworld Empowerment Awards
- Newsmaker of the year (2006) – Awarded by Association of Black Securities and Investment Professionals
- Investment specialist of the year (2004) – Awarded by Black Business Quarterly
- Financial services achiever of the year (2003) – Awarded by the Association of Black Securities and Investment Professionals

Preceded by	Chief Executive Officer of Public Investment Corporation; 2003-2010	Succeeded by Masilela, E.
Preceded by Ramos, M.	Chief Executive Officer of Transnet; 2011-2016	Succeeded by Gama, S.
Preceded by Matona, T	Chief Executive Officer of Eskom; 2015-2016	Succeeded by Hadebe, P.

== See also ==
- List of National Assembly members of the 28th Parliament of South Africa
