= Shara Singh =

South African politician

Member of the National Assembly of South Africa
- Incumbent
- Assumed office 14 June 2024

Personal details
- Born: June 27, 1964 (age 61)
- Party: Democratic Alliance

Shara Singh (born 27 June 1964) is a South African politician and a Member of Parliament (MP) for the Democratic Alliance (DA).

She was elected to the National Assembly of South Africa in the 2024 South African general election, where she was 27th on the national party list.

Singh is of Indian descent.

== See also ==
- List of National Assembly members of the 28th Parliament of South Africa
