= Edwin Macrae Bath =

South African politician

Edwin Macrae Bath MP

Member of the National Assembly of South Africa
- Incumbent
- Assumed office 14 June 2024

Personal details
- Party: Democratic Alliance
- Profession: Politician

Edwin Macrae Bath is a South African politician and a Member of Parliament (MP) for the Democratic Alliance (DA). He was elected to the National Assembly of South Africa in the 2024 South African general election, where he was 34th on the national party list. Bath is a "Public Sector Built Environment Specialist" by profession.

== See also ==
- List of National Assembly members of the 28th Parliament of South Africa
