= Lungisani Shangase =

South African politician

Lungisani Shangase MP

Member of the National Assembly of South Africa
- Incumbent
- Assumed office 25 June 2025
- Preceded by: Bongani Mfiki
- In office 25 June 2024 – 7 August 2024
- Succeeded by: Thulani Gamede

Personal details
- Born: Lungisani Graduate Shangase
- Party: uMkhonto weSizwe Party
- Profession: Politician

Lungisani Graduate Shangase is a South African politician who has been a Member of the National Assembly of South Africa since June 2025, representing the uMkhonto weSizwe Party. He previously served in the assembly between June and August 2024.

== Parliamentary career ==
Shangase was elected to the National Assembly of South Africa in the 2024 general election from the uMkhonto weSizwe Party's KwaZulu-Natal list. He was sworn into office on 25 June 2024. He was appointed to serve on the Portfolio Committee on Social Development on 8 July 2024. Shangase was one of a number of MK MPs who were expelled from the party and ceased to be members of parliament on 7 August 2024.

Shangase returned to the National Assembly as an MK MP in June 2025. He was appointed to the Portfolio Committee on Home Affairs and the Portfolio Committee on Correctional Services in July 2025.
