= Lorato Mathopa =

South African politician

Lorato Mathopa MP

Member of the National Assembly of South Africa
- Incumbent
- Assumed office 27 November 2024
- Preceded by: Stacey-Lee Khojane

Personal details
- Party: Patriotic Alliance
- Profession: Politician

Millicent Lorato Mathopa is a South African politician who has been a Member of the National Assembly of South Africa since November 2024, representing the Patriotic Alliance. In parliament, she sits on the Portfolio Committee on Home Affairs.

Mathopa had previously served as a councillor in the Matlosana Local Municipality.
