= Rishigen Viranna =

South African politician

Member of the KwaZulu-Natal Legislature
- In office 21 May 2014 – 16 August 2022
- Succeeded by: Edwin Baptie

Personal details
- Born: Rishigen Viranna
- Party: Democratic Alliance

Rishigen Viranna is a South African former politician and healthcare practitioner from KwaZulu-Natal who served as a Member of the KwaZulu-Natal Legislature from May 2014 until his resignation in August 2022. He is a party member of the Democratic Alliance (DA). Viranna served the party's spokesperson on Health at the time of his resignation. He was previously the party's spokesperson on Community Safety and Education.

In June 2022, Viranna announced his intention to resign from the legislature after he was awarded a two-year scholarship to study Global Health at Uppsala University in Sweden. He resigned from the legislature on 16 August 2022. The DA appointed Edwin Baptie to take up his seat.
