= Jasmine Petersen =

South African politician

Member of the National Assembly of South Africa
- Incumbent
- Assumed office 2024
- Constituency: Gauteng

Personal details
- Born: 2002 (age 23–24)
- Party: Patriotic Alliance

Jasmine Shanon Petersen (born 2002) is a South African politician and a member of Parliament (MP) for the Patriotic Alliance (PA). She was elected to the National Assembly of South Africa in the 2024 South African general election.

== See also ==
- List of National Assembly members of the 28th Parliament of South Africa
