= Sanele Zondo =

South African politician

Sanele Zondo MP

Member of the National Assembly of South Africa
- Incumbent
- Assumed office 15 February 2022
- Preceded by: Mthokozisi Nxumalo
- Constituency: KwaZulu-Natal

Personal details
- Born: Sanele Sethembeni Zondo; 26 March 1992 (age 34) Hluhluwe
- Party: Inkatha Freedom Party
- Education: Ethekwini TVET College
- Profession: Politician
- Committees: Portfolio Committee on Higher Education, Science and Technology; Portfolio Committee on Public Works and Infrastructure

Sanele Sethembeni Zondo (born 26 March 1992) is a South African politician from KwaZulu-Natal. He is currently a Member of Parliament (MP) for the Inkatha Freedom Party. Zondo also serves as the Deputy National Chairperson of the Inkatha Freedom Party Youth Brigade.

== Early life and career ==
Zondo was born on 26 March 1992 and grew up in Hluhluwe in KwaZulu-Natal. He attended the Ethekwini TVET College. Zondo formerly served as an Inkatha Freedom Party councillor in the Big Five Hlabisa Local Municipality. He is the current deputy national chair of the IFP Youth Brigade.

After the IFP won control of the uMkhanyakude District Municipality in the local government elections held on 1 November 2021, Zondo accused the ANC of refusing the yield power in the district and claimed that there was a lot of irregularities during the first sitting of the newly elected Mtubatuba Local Municipality council. He demanded that the uMkhanyakude district "be given to the party [IFP] voted for by the people" and called on the national ANC Minister of Water and Sanitation, Senzo Mchunu, in December 2021 to renounce all national government interventions in the district and let the IFP govern the district municipality.

== Parliamentary career ==
On 8 February 2022, IFP spokesman Mkhuleko Hlengwa said that the party had welcomed Zondo and Nhlanhla Hadebe's appointment as IFP MPs. Zondo was selected to fill the vacancy left by the death of IFP National Youth Bridge chairperson and National Assembly member Mthokozisi Nxumalo. Zondo was sworn in as a Member of the National Assembly on 15 February 2022 by Speaker Nosiviwe Mapisa-Nqakula. Zondo is a member of the Portfolio Committee on Higher Education, Science and Technology and the Portfolio Committee on Public Works and Infrastructure.

Zondo was placed high enough on the IFP's regional-to-national list to be returned to the National Assembly following the 2024 general election.
