= Nkosentsha Shezi =

South African politician (1976–2026)

Member of the National Assembly of South Africa
- In office 14 June 2024 – 23 March 2026

Personal details
- Born: 22 March 1976
- Died: 23 March 2026 (aged 50)
- Party: uMkhonto weSizwe Party
- Other political affiliations: African National Congress

Ntandoyenkosi Nkosentsha Shezi (22 March 1976 – 23 March 2026) was a South African politician who was a member of Parliament (MP) for the uMkhonto weSizwe Party (MK). He was previously a member of the African National Congress (ANC).

Shezi died on 23 March 2026, one day after his 50th birthday.

== See also ==
- List of National Assembly members of the 28th Parliament of South Africa
