= Lencel Komane =

South African politician (b. 1972)

Lencel Komane MP

Member of the National Assembly of South Africa
- Incumbent
- Assumed office 14 June 2024
- Preceded by: Anthony Matumba
- Constituency: Limpopo

Personal details
- Born: 10 July 1972 (age 53)
- Party: Economic Freedom Fighters
- Profession: Politician

Lencel Mashidika Komane (born 10 July 1972) is a South African politician who has been a Member of the National Assembly of South Africa since June 2024, representing the Economic Freedom Fighters.

== Parliamentary career ==
A member of the Economic Freedom Fighters party, Komane was ranked seventh on the party's regional to national list for the 2024 general election. Although he was not initially elected to Parliament, he was later chosen to fill Anthony Matumba's seat when Matumba declined to take up the position.

In July 2024, Komane was appointed as an alternate member of both the Portfolio Committee on Energy and Electricity and the Portfolio Committee on Basic Education. On 27 November 2024, he relinquished his membership of the Portfolio Committee on Electricity and Energy; he now only serves as an alternate member of the Portfolio Committee on Basic Education.

Komane was elected to serve as an additional member of the EFF's Central Command Team at the party's elective conference in December 2024.
