= Mmabatho Mokoena-Zondi =

South African politician

Mmabatho Mokoena-Zondi MP

Member of the National Assembly of South Africa
- Incumbent
- Assumed office 13 February 2026
- Preceded by: Brian Molefe

Personal details
- Party: uMkhonto weSizwe Party
- Other political affiliations: African National Congress (former)

Seeng Mmabatho Nthabiseng Mokoena-Zondi is a South African politician who is a Member of Parliament (MP) for the uMkhonto weSizwe Party (MK). She replaced Brian Molefe in 2026. She is a former ANC Youth League leader and served as a member in the National Council of Provinces. She is the Chief Whip.

== See also ==
- List of National Assembly members of the 28th Parliament of South Africa
