= Toby Chance =

South African politician

Member of the National Assembly of South Africa
- Incumbent
- Assumed office 25 June 2024
- Leader: John Steenhuisen

DA Spokesperson on Trade, Industry & Competition
- Incumbent
- Assumed office 17 July 2024
- Deputy: Mlondi Mdluli

DA Shadow Minister on Small Business Development
- In office 17 June 2014 – 8 May 2019
- Deputy: Henro Krugrer
- Leader: Mmusi Maimane

Personal details
- Born: 8 May 1960 (age 66) United Kingdom
- Citizenship: Dual UK/SA
- Party: Democratic Alliance
- Spouse: Diana Lucas
- Education: Fitzwilliam College, Cambridge
- Occupation: Politician
- Portfolio: Trade, Industry & Competition

Roger William Tobias Chance (born 8 May 1960) is a British-born South African politician and a Member of Parliament (MP) for the Democratic Alliance (DA).

He was elected to the National Assembly of South Africa for Gauteng in the 2024 South African general election and appointed DA Spokesperson on Trade, Industry & Competition.

Better known as Toby Chance, he served as an MP in the 5th Parliament from 2014 to 2019 as Shadow Minister and DA Spokesperson on Small Business Development.

Prior to entering politics Chance founded, managed or run several businesses in the tech, communications, publishing and events management sectors. From 2010 to 2014 he was managing director of Adele Lucas Promotions (ALP), founded by the doyenne of PR in South Africa Adele Lucas. . ALP specialised in creating and organising large-scale events including the Soweto Festival Expo , the Khayelitsha Festival and the Cape Town Summer Market . The Festival of Africa , run in partnership with the Regional Tourism Organisation of Southern Africa, was staged at Melrose Arch during the 2010 Fifa World Cup as fan-park and celebration of African culture, music and dance.

== Education ==
Chance was educated at Eton College and Fitzwilliam College, Cambridge, graduating with a BA (Hons) in Geography in 1982. He served as Chairman of the Tory Reform Group in 1981 and spent his summer vacation that year working at the House of Commons Select Committee on Energy as a research assistant.

== Political career ==
Chance joined the Democratic Alliance in 2009, shortly after the 2009 General Election 2009 South African general election, becoming a member of Ward 87 in the City of Johannesburg and a member of the branch committee executive. After the ward boundary demarcation changes in 2010 he moved to Ward 117 and was elected to the branch executive committee. He assisted in the 2011 Local Government Elections 2011 South African municipal elections which saw the DA re-elected as the official opposition in the Johannesburg City Council.

In 2012 he led a project to test the business needs and political affiliations of small business owners in Soweto. At the time he was managing director of Adele Lucas Promotions which had run the annual Soweto Festival Expo since 2005. In 2013 he was appointed Treasurer of the DA Sandton Constituency.

In February 2014 Chance was selected as a candidate for the 2014 National and Provincial Elections 2014 South African general election, working in the Soweto constituency with political head James Lorimer. The DA won 89 seats in the National Assembly and Chance took his seat as a DA Member of Parliament in the 5th Parliament . DA Leader Helen Zille was Premier of the Western Cape and newly elected MP Mmusi Maimane was appointed the DA Leader in Parliament. Maimane appointed John Steenhuisen as Chief Whip and Chance as the DA Shadow Minister of Small Business Development in June 2014, a position he held until the May 2019 National and Provincial Elections. He served as a member of the Portfolio Committee on Small Business Development. The ANC appointed Lindiwe Zulu as Minister and Ruth Bhengu as Chairperson of the Portfolio Committee.

In May 2015 Steenhuisen appointed Chance to serve on the Ad-Hoc Committee Probing Violence against Foreign Nationals, formed after an outbreak of violence in certain townships in South Africa that saw several spaza shops (small retail outlets) burned and destroyed and their owners harassed or murdered.

In 2018 Chance introduced a private member's bill into Parliament, the Small Enterprises Ombud Service Bill. This was in response to numerous complaints from small business owners of ill-treatment by government and large companies who failed to honour contracts, did not pay invoices on time, stole their intellectual property and generally treated them with contempt due to there being no adequate means for the small business owners to seek justice or recourse. The Ombud service was to act as an alternative dispute resolution mechanism to reduce the cost of litigation and speed up the judicial process. The ANC members in the portfolio committee voted to declare the bill "undesirable" and the bill failed to pass in its second reading in the National Assembly.

As a postscript, the Department of Small Business Development later revived Chance's bill, the core elements being incorporated into the National Small Enterprises Amendment Bill of 2024 which President Cyril Ramaphosa signed into law on 18 July 2024 .

Chance wrote a regular blog on his time in Parliament and contributed numerous articles in publications such as Business Day, Business Times, Sowetan, Independent on Sunday, Financial Mail among others.

Chance failed to return as an MP in the 6th Parliament but remained active in the DA, being elected to the Gauteng Provincial Executive in 2021 where he served a three-year term as a Non-Public Rep.

In March 2024 Chance was selected as a candidate for the 2024 National and Provincial Elections and was elected on 29 May to serve in the 7th Parliament . On 17 July DA Leader John Steenhuisen appointed Chance DA National Spokesperson on Trade, Industry & Competition.

== Early business career and journey to South Africa ==
Chance received an industrial scholarship to Cambridge University from Metal Box . In his gap year he worked in three-month spells in their factories in Portslade on the Sussex coast, Sutton-in-Ashfield in Nottinghamshire and their head office in Reading. After graduating in June 1982, Chance spent 6 weeks in South Africa before re-joining the firm as a management trainee. In September 1982 he was appointed Commercial Assistant and Production Planner at the Metal Box factory in Aintree in Merseyside which specialised in making tobacco tins.

In the 1983 general election Chance joined the Young Conservatives and assisted in the election of Malcolm Thornton as MP for Crosby, defeating Shirley Williams who had been elected in a 1981 by-election as a member of the Labour-breakaway Social Democratic Party.

In December 1983 Chance resigned from Metal Box and in January 1984 joined an overland expedition through northern and central Africa. Along with 21 companions, he travelled in a World War II Bedford truck from London through 15 countries, arriving in Nairobi at the end of May. Along the way he spent time with Tuareg nomads in Algeria and a Housa family in Niger, canoed a dugout pirogue on the Ubangui River in the Central African Republic, climbed some of the highest sand dunes in the Sahara Desert, hunted dikdik antelope with a pygmy tribe and tracked the rare Okapi antelope in the Ituri Forest, sailed up the Zaire River on a trading barge to Kisangani (a town fictionalised in VS Naipaul's book A bend in the river), trekked to see mountain gorillas in the eastern highlands of Zaire, drove among herds of wildebeest and zebra in Ngorongoro Crater and the Serengeti plains in Tanzania, ending the journey with a five-day ascent of Kilimanjaro. After recovering on Lamu island from a sustained attack of dysentery he travelled to Zimbabwe and from there to South Africa, arriving at the end of August.

After moving to Durban and a spell selling encyclopedias door-to-door, Chance joined Customheat as a salesman and later established his own company selling and installing solar water-heating systems, based in Pinetown, KwaZulu-Natal. The political and financial crisis in South Africa that erupted after President PW Botha's Rubicon Speech (which Chance attended at the Durban City Hall in August 1985) pushed up interest rates to historic highs, forcing Chance to close the business in 1986. He later joined McGraw-Hill as an academic book salesman. He was appointed Professional Books sales executive in September 1987 and moved to Johannesburg which has been his home ever since.

== Family ==
Chance is descended from the Chance baronets. His great-great-grandfather James Timmins Chance was created a baronet by Queen Victoria in 1900 for "services to seafarers", a reference to his and the firm of Chance Brothers' dominance of lighthouse design and engineering since 1851 . Toby Chance's elder brother Sebastian Chance is the 5th baronet.

His branch of the Chance family can be traced to the 1300s in the English county of Worcestershire.

In 2006 Chance married Diana Lucas, a leading television producer/director with many awards for work commissioned by Carte Blanche (TV series) Carte Blanche, Multichoice and other television channels.

== Lighthouses ==
Chance's book, Lighthouses, The Race to Illuminate the World , co-authored with Peter Williams, was published by New Holland Publishers in 2008. The book tells the story of how his family's business, Chance Brothers became the world's leading designer, manufacturer and installer of lighthouse optics and complete lighthouse assemblies including the towers, lamps, lighting apparatus, lantern, revolving mechanisms and fog horns.

== Chance Heritage Trust ==
The Chance Heritage Trust was established in 2015 to preserve and restore the remains of the Grade II listed Chance Brothers glassworks in Smethwick near Birmingham. Toby Chance, his elder brother Sir Sebastian Chance and historian and glass expert David Encill are Ambassadors of the Trust, which is chaired by Mark Davies. Henry Chance, a first cousin of Toby and Sebastian Chance, is vice-chairman.

== See also ==
- List of National Assembly members of the 28th Parliament of South Africa
