= Olga Seate =

South African politician

Olga Seate MP

Member of the National Assembly of South Africa
- Incumbent
- Assumed office 14 June 2024

Personal details
- Party: African National Congress
- Profession: Politician

Makithing Olga Seate is a South African politician and a Member of Parliament (MP) for the African National Congress (ANC). She was elected to the National Assembly of South Africa in the 2024 South African general election, where she was 77th on the national party list. Seate hails from the mining town of Welkom in the Free State.

== See also ==
- List of National Assembly members of the 28th Parliament of South Africa
