= Ernest Hendricks =

South African politician

Member of the National Assembly of South Africa
- Incumbent
- Assumed office 2024
- Constituency: Western Cape

Personal details
- Party: Patriotic Alliance

Ernest G. Hendricks is a South African politician and a Member of Parliament (MP) for the Patriotic Alliance (PA). He was elected to the National Assembly of South Africa in the 2024 South African general election. He was previously Western Cape Regional Security Manager.

== See also ==
- List of National Assembly members of the 28th Parliament of South Africa
