= Colleen Makhubele =

South African politician

Member of the National Assembly of South Africa
- In office 23 January 2025 – 23 February 2026
- Succeeded by: Sithembile Nkosi

Personal details
- Party: uMkhonto weSizwe Party

Tshikani Colleen Makhubele is a South African politician. Makhubele was previously Johannesburg council speaker. She is the former president of the South African Rainbow Alliance and was a member of Parliament (MP) for the uMkhonto weSizwe Party (MK).

On 5 November 2025, John Hlophe sacked Makhubele as the MK's Chief Whip and replaced her with Des van Rooyen.

She was reinstated by party leader Jacob Zuma the next day, who in turn suspended John Hlophe. Makhubele was again removed as chief whip in January 2026.

Makhubele resigned as MP in February 2026.

== See also ==
- List of National Assembly members of the 28th Parliament of South Africa
