= Siyabonga Gama =

South African politician

Member of the National Assembly of South Africa
- Incumbent
- Assumed office 2024

Personal details
- Party: uMkhonto weSizwe Party

Siyabonga Innocent Gama is a South African politician and a member of Parliament (MP) for the uMkhonto weSizwe Party (MK). He was elected to the National Assembly of South Africa in the 2024 South African general election. Gama was CEO of Transnet Group.

== See also ==
- List of National Assembly members of the 28th Parliament of South Africa
