= Lilian Managa =

South African politician

Member of the National Assembly of South Africa
- Incumbent
- Assumed office 2024

Personal details
- Party: Economic Freedom Fighters

Lilian Managa is a South African politician and a Member of Parliament (MP) for the Economic Freedom Fighters (EFF). She was elected to the National Assembly of South Africa in the 2024 South African general election, where she was 46th on the national party list.

== See also ==
- List of National Assembly members of the 28th Parliament of South Africa
