= Brian Blose =

South African politician

Member of the National Assembly of South Africa
- Incumbent
- Assumed office 2024
- Constituency: KwaZulu-Natal

Personal details
- Party: Economic Freedom Fighters

Mazwikayise Brian Blose is a South African politician and a member of Parliament (MP) for the Economic Freedom Fighters (EFF). He was elected to the National Assembly of South Africa in the 2024 South African general election.

== See also ==
- List of National Assembly members of the 28th Parliament of South Africa
