= Sihle Lonzi =

South African politician

Sihle Lonzi MP
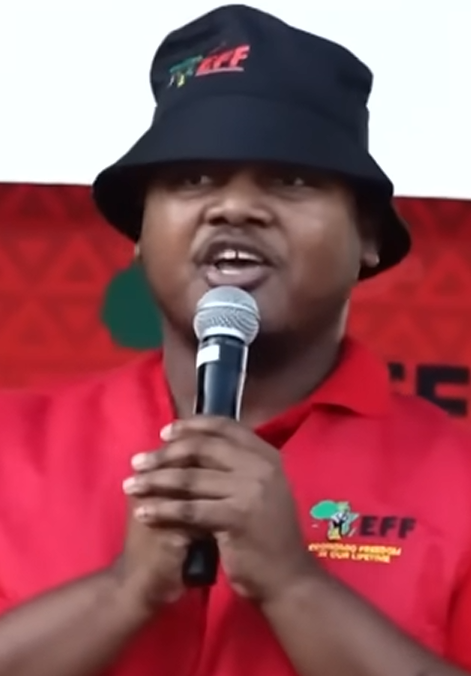
- Lonzi in 2026

President of the EFF Students Command
- In office 24 July 2022 – 3 February 2025
- Preceded by: Mandla Shikwambana
- Succeeded by: Office abolished

Member of the National Assembly of South Africa
- Incumbent
- Assumed office 14 November 2024
- Preceded by: Busisiwe Mkhwebane
- Constituency: Mpumalanga

Personal details
- Born: 1997 or 1998 (age 27–28)
- Education: South African College Schools
- Alma mater: University of Cape Town (no degree)
- Profession: Politician

Sihle Lonzi (born 1997 or 1998) is a South African politician who has served as a Member of the National Assembly of South Africa since November 2024, representing the Economic Freedom Fighters party, of which he led the party's student wing from 2022 until 2025.

== Background and political career ==
Lonzi matriculated from the South African College Schools in Cape Town in 2015 where he served as head boy and played for the school's first rugby team. After matriculating, he went on to study economics and philosophy at the University of Cape Town where he became involved with the Rhodes Must Fall movement. He became allied with Sinawo Thambo and the two launched the EFF Students Command at the university. He served two terms on the UCT Student Representative Council and was the provincial spokesperson of the EFF Student Command.

In July 2022, Lonzi was elected president of the EFF Students Command.

== Parliamentary career ==
Following the resignation of Busisiwe Mkhwebane as an EFF Member of Parliament in October 2024, the party selected Lonzi to fill her seat. He was sworn in on 14 November 2024. Shortly afterwards, he was appointed to serve on the Portfolio Committee on Higher Education and the Portfolio Committee on Sport, Arts and Culture.

In January 2025, Lonzi introduced a private member’s bill to Parliament that aims to clear all student debt in South Africa.

On 3 February 2025, EFF leader Julius Malema announced that the EFF Students Command had been dissolved and replaced by a newly formed youth command following a resolution passed at the party’s National Elective Conference in December 2024.
