= Malebo Kobe =

South African politician

Member of the National Assembly of South Africa
- Incumbent
- Assumed office 2024
- Constituency: National List

Personal details
- Party: ActionSA
- Education: Jilin University

Malebo Patricia Kobe is a South African politician and member of Parliament (MP) for the ActionSA. She was elected to the National Assembly of South Africa in the 2024 South African general election. She holds a master's degree in international relations from Jilin University in China.

== See also ==
- List of National Assembly members of the 28th Parliament of South Africa
