= Juliet Basson =

South African politician

Juliet Basson MP

Member of the National Assembly of South Africa
- Incumbent
- Assumed office 25 June 2025
- Preceded by: Filicity Rorke
- Constituency: National List

Personal details
- Party: Patriotic Alliance
- Profession: Politician

Juliet Adileen Basson is a South African politician who has been a Member of the National Assembly of South Africa since June 2025, representing the Patriotic Alliance.

== Political career ==
Basson stood as the Patriotic Alliance's candidate during a municipal by-election in ward 7 (Ermelo) of the Msukaligwa Local Municipality in October 2024, which she lost, however, the Patriotic Alliance's support in the ward significantly increased during the by-election.

In June 2025, Basson was sworn in as a Member of Parliament in the National Assembly for the PA. As of July 2025, she is a member of the Portfolio Committee on Employment and Labour and the Portfolio Committee on Tourism.

In February 2026, Basson described the conditions she observed during a parliamentary oversight visit to sweatshops in Newcastle to slavery.
