= Ryan Smith (South African politician) =

South African politician

Member of the National Assembly of South Africa
- Incumbent
- Assumed office 14 June 2024

Personal details
- Party: Democratic Alliance

Ryan Smith is a South African politician and a Member of Parliament (MP) for the Democratic Alliance (DA).

He was elected to the National Assembly of South Africa in the 2024 South African general election, where he was 59th on the national party list. The Democratic Alliance announced on 29 July 2025, that Smith would become spokesperson on the International Relations portfolio in Parliament after Emma Powell chose to resign from the role.

== See also ==
- List of National Assembly members of the 28th Parliament of South Africa
