= Emerald Madlala =

South African politician

Emerald Madlala MP

Member of the National Assembly of South Africa
- Incumbent
- Assumed office 25 June 2024
- Constituency: KwaZulu-Natal

Personal details
- Born: Emerald Kwenzokuhle Madlala
- Party: uMkhonto weSizwe Party
- Profession: Politician

Emerald Kwenzokuhle Madlala is a South African politician who was elected to the National Assembly of South Africa in the 2024 general election as a member of the uMkhonto weSizwe Party. He was sworn into office on 25 June 2024.

As of July 2024, Madlala is a member of the Portfolio Committee on Agriculture. He was appointed an alternate member of the Standing Committee on Public Accounts in September 2024. He was also an ordinary member of the Standing Committee on Public Accounts and an alternate member of the Portfolio Committee on Transport between September and November 2024.

In June 2025, Madlala questioned the need for a SCOPA inquiry into the Road Accident Fund, arguing that the committee had dealt with far worse entities, and further saying that "the CEO must go."
