= Tshepo Louw =

South African politician

Tshepo Louw MP

Member of the National Assembly of South Africa
- Incumbent
- Assumed office 14 June 2024

Personal details
- Born: Sedukanelo Tshepo David Louw; 2 August 1990 (age 35)
- Party: African National Congress

Sedukanelo Tshepo David Louw (born 2 August 1990) is a South African politician who has been a Member of the National Assembly of South Africa since 2024, representing the African National Congress.

== Political career ==
Louw served as Collen Malatji's chief lobbyist in the Northern Cape during Malatji's campaign for president of the African National Congress Youth League. At the youth league's 2023 national elective conference, Malatji was elected to a seat on the National Executive Committee as Malatji was elected the organisation's president.

In 2024, Louw was elected to the National Assembly of South Africa as an ANC representative from the Northern Cape. Louw was appointed to lead the ANC's study group on basic education. In November 2024, Louw urged president Cyril Ramaphosa to announce the commencement of all provisions of the Basic Education Laws Amendment Act with immediate effect.
