= Zibuse Cele =

South African politician

Member of the National Assembly of South Africa
- Incumbent
- Assumed office 25 June 2025

Personal details
- Party: uMkhonto weSizwe Party

Zibuse Khayelihle Abednego Cele is a South African politician and a member of Parliament (MP) for the uMkhonto weSizwe Party (MK). He was a candidate for the National Assembly of South Africa in the 2024 South African general election. He assumed office in 2025.

== See also ==
- List of National Assembly members of the 28th Parliament of South Africa
