= Mandlenkosi Matutu =

South African politician

Mandlenkosi Matutu MP

Member of the National Assembly of South Africa
- Incumbent
- Assumed office 25 June 2024

Personal details
- Born: Mandlenkosi James Matutu
- Party: uMkhonto weSizwe Party
- Profession: Politician

Mandlenkosi James Matutu is a South African politician and a Member of Parliament in the National Assembly of South Africa for the uMkhonto weSizwe Party. He was elected in the 2024 general election and sworn into office in June 2024.

Matutu was appointed to serve on the Portfolio Committee on Public Service and Administration in July 2024. In addition to that, he was appointed to serve on the Portfolio Committee on Correctional Services as well in February 2025. He relinquished his membership of both committees in July 2025, when he was appointed an alternate member of the Portfolio Committee on Agriculture and a member of the Portfolio Committee on Water and Sanitation.
