= Adil Nchabeleng =

South African politician

Adil Nchabeleng MP

Member of the National Assembly of South Africa
- Incumbent
- Assumed office 28 January 2025

Personal details
- Party: uMkhonto weSizwe
- Profession: Politician

Adil Nchabeleng is a South African Member of Parliament for the uMkhonto weSizwe party. He was sworn into office on 28 January 2025. In parliament, he sits on the Portfolio Committee on Electricity and Energy and the Portfolio Committee on Mineral and Petroleum Resources.

Nchabeleng is also the Bapedi crown prince.
