= Glen Taaibosch =

South African politician

Glen Taaibosch MP

Member of the National Assembly of South Africa
- Incumbent
- Assumed office 25 June 2024

Personal details
- Born: 23 August 1963 (age 63)
- Party: UMkhonto weSizwe Party
- Profession: Politician

Glen Taaibosch (born 23 August 1963) is a South African politician and Khoisan activist who has been a Member of the National Assembly of South Africa for the UMkhonto weSizwe Party since June 2024.

== Parliamentary career ==
Taaibosch was ranked 41st on the UMkhonto weSizwe Party party list for the 2024 general election. He initially did not make the list of MPs elected to the National Assembly, however, Rochelle Davidson, who was elected, was expelled from the MK Party and Taaibosch was selected to take up her seat in parliament. Taaibosch was sworn in on 25 June 2024, along with the other MKP MPs.

As of July 2025 Taaibosch is a member of the Portfolio Committee on Health, an alternate member of the Portfolio Committee on Correctional Services and an alternate member of the Portfolio Committee on Cooperative Governance and Traditional Affairs.
