= Thalente Kubheka =

South African politician

Member of the National Assembly of South Africa
- Incumbent
- Assumed office 15 June 2024

Personal details
- Born: November 21, 1982 (age 43)
- Party: uMkhonto weSizwe Party

Thalente Thuthukani Sakhike Khubeka (born 21 November 1982) is a South African politician and a member of Parliament (MP) for the uMkhonto weSizwe Party (MK).

== See also ==
- List of National Assembly members of the 28th Parliament of South Africa
