= Shunmugam Moodley =

South African politician

Shunmugam Moodley MP

Member of the National Assembly of South Africa
- Incumbent
- Assumed office 25 June 2024

Personal details
- Party: UMkhonto weSizwe Party
- Profession: Politician

Shunmugam Ramsamy Moodley is a South African politician and a Member of Parliament for the UMkhonto weSizwe Party since 2024. He is of Indian origin.

== Parliamentary career ==
Moodley was elected to the National Assembly in the 2024 general election as a member of the UMkhonto weSizwe Party. He was sworn into office on 25 June 2024, along with the 57 other MK National Assembly MPs, as the party had boycotted the inaugural sitting of parliament. Upon his swearing-in, Moodley said that education would be one of his top priorities as a Member of Parliament. Moodley is a member of the Portfolio Committee on Tourism.
