= Kingsley Wakelin =

South African politician

Kingsley Wakelin MP

Member of the National Assembly of South Africa
- Incumbent
- Assumed office 14 June 2024
- Constituency: Gauteng

Personal details
- Born: 27 December 1968 (age 57)
- Party: Democratic Alliance
- Profession: Politician

Kingsley Hope Wakelin (born 27 December 1968) is a South African politician and a Member of Parliament (MP) for the Democratic Alliance (DA). He was elected to the National Assembly of South Africa in the 2024 South African general election, where he was 76th on the national party list.

Wakelin was MMC for Corporate and Shared Service in the City of Tshwane Metropolitan Municipality until 2024.

== See also ==
- List of National Assembly members of the 28th Parliament of South Africa
