= Theresa Jeyi =

South African politician

Theresa Jeyi MP

Member of the National Assembly of South Africa
- Incumbent
- Assumed office 14 July 2026

Personal details
- Party: Patriotic Alliance (2025–present)
- Other political affiliations: Democratic Alliance (2023–2025); Independent Civic Organisation of South Africa (2016–2021); African National Congress (Until 2016)

Theresa Jeyi (née Fortuin) is a South African politician who has been a Member of the National Assembly of South Africa since July 2026, representing the Patriotic Alliance. Jeyi had previously served as a councillor in the Garden Route District Municipality and the George Local Municipality for numerous political parties, including the African National Congress, the Independent Civic Organisation of South Africa, Good, and the Democratic Alliance.

== Political career ==
Jeyi was a member of the African National Congress and represented the party in the George Local Municipality council by 2012. During a council meeting in September 2012, the council speaker Mercia Draghoender instructed law enforcement personnel to remove Jeyi and ANC supporters from the gallery. Jeyi defected to the Independent Civic Organisation of South Africa party during the May 2016 municipal council meeting. She was elected to the council of the Eden District Municipality for ICOSA in the August 2016 local government election. In June 2020, ICOSA announced that Jeyi and George municipality councillor Wilbur Harris would exchange positions.

Jeyi defected to the Good Party led by Patricia de Lille in September 2021, months before the local government elections in November 2021. She was announced as the party's aspirant candidate for Ward 16 for the municipal election. She won the seat during the nationwide municipal elections on 1 November 2021.

Jeyi resigned from Good and joined the Democratic Alliance in April 2023. She was selected as the DA's candidate for the subsequent by-election in her ward in July 2023, which she won. In October that same year, Jeyi was appointed to the Mayoral Committee, responsible for the Community Services (Refuse, Environment and Parks) portfolio. She was elected the chief whip of council in June 2024, following Jackie von Brandis's election as mayor.

Jeyi joined the Patriotic Alliance in November 2025, becoming the third DA councillor in the municipality to do so in a short succession. She was not selected as the PA's candidate for the subsequent by-election. She was sworn in as a member of parliament for the PA in July 2026.

== Personal life ==
Jeyi married during the nationwide COVID-19 pandemic lockdown in 2020.
