= Andrew Bateman =

South African politician

Andrew Bateman MP

Member of the National Assembly of South Africa
- Incumbent
- Assumed office 14 June 2024
- Constituency: Western Cape

Personal details
- Party: Democratic Alliance
- Profession: Politician

Andrew Gordon Bateman is a South African politician and a Member of Parliament (MP) for the Democratic Alliance (DA). He was elected to the National Assembly of South Africa for the Western Cape in the 2024 South African general election, where he was 63rd on the national party list.

== See also ==
- List of National Assembly members of the 28th Parliament of South Africa
