= Mbali Dlamini =

South African politician

Mbali Dlamini MP

Permanent Delegate to the National Council of Provinces

Assembly Member for Mpumalanga
- Incumbent
- Assumed office September 2022

Personal details
- Born: Mkhondo, Mpumalanga; South Africa
- Party: Economic Freedom Fighters
- Education: Tshwane University of Technology

Mbali Dlamini is a South African politician from Mpumalanga. A member of the Economic Freedom Fighters (EFF), she has represented Mpumalanga in the National Council of Provinces since 2022.

== Life and career ==
Dlamini was born in Mkhondo, Mpumalanga. She joined the EFF in 2014 while a student at the Tshwane University of Technology, and she was elected to the party's Central Command in 2019. Before her ascension to Parliament, from November 2021 to September 2022, Dlamini represented the EFF as a local councillor in Gert Sibande District Municipality.
