= Michael Segede =

South African politician (born 1968)

The Honourable Michael Segede

Member of the National Assembly
- Incumbent
- Assumed office 4 December 2024

Personal details
- Born: 11 November 1968 (age 57) Upington, South Africa
- Party: African National Congress

Michael Segede (born 11 November 1968) is South African politician from the Northern Cape who has represented the African National Congress (ANC) in the National Assembly since December 2024. He was formerly the mayor of the Northern Cape's Dawid Kruiper Local Municipality.

== Life and career ==
Born on 11 November 1968, Segede was born and raised in Upington in the Northern Cape and matriculated at Paballelo High School. He served continuously as an ANC local councillor in the Dawid Kruiper municipality between 2009 and 2024, including as a member of the Mayoral Committee, speaker of the council, and most recently as executive mayor. He was also involved in soccer administration in the Northern Cape, including as chairperson of the Wings United Football Club.

In November 2024, the ANC's Northern Cape branch announced a reshuffle of key municipalities, which it said was designed partly as a response to the party's poor performance in the region in the May 2024 general election. As part of the reshuffle, Segede stepped down as mayor, replaced by David Kazi. The ANC subsequently amended its national party list to include Segede, and on 4 December 2024 he was sworn in to the National Assembly to fill the seat formerly held by Martha Bartlett.
