= Matlhodi Maseko =

South African politician (born 1969)

Member of the National Assembly of South Africa
- Incumbent
- Assumed office 25 June 2024

Member of the Western Cape Provincial Parliament
- In office 21 May 2014 – 28 May 2024

Personal details
- Born: 29 July 1969 (age 56)
- Party: Democratic Alliance
- Occupation: Politician

Letta Matlhodi Maseko (born 29 July 1969) is a South African politician who has been a Member of the National Assembly of South Africa for the Democratic Alliance (DA) since 2024. Prior to her election to Parliament, she served as a Member of the Western Cape Provincial Parliament from 2014 to 2024.

== Political career ==
Maseko is a member of the Democratic Alliance. She worked as a project coordinator in the housing department of the Cederberg Local Municipality until her appointment as a proportional representation councillor in 2012.

In 2014, she was elected to the Western Cape Provincial Parliament. She was then elected chairperson of the legislature's Standing Committee on Human Settlements. Maseko remained in the position following her re-election in 2019. During her second term in the provincial parliament, she also served as the DA's caucus chairperson.

Maseko stood as a DA parliamentary candidate on the Western Cape regional list in the 2024 national elections and was subsequently elected to the National Assembly of South Africa. She was sworn in on 25 June 2024. She is a member of the Portfolio Committee on Higher Education.
