= Thokozani Langa (politician) =

South African politician

Member of the National Assembly of South Africa
- Incumbent
- Assumed office 4 December 2024
- In office 22 May 2019 – 3 February 2023

Personal details
- Party: Inkatha Freedom Party (2023–present)
- Other political affiliations: Economic Freedom Fighters (Until 2023)
- Profession: Politician

Thokozani Makhosonke Langa is a South African politician who was elected to the National Assembly of South Africa in the 2019 general election as a member of the Economic Freedom Fighters (EFF) party.

Langa was an alternate member of the Portfolio Committee on Mineral Resources and Energy; he had previously served as a member of the Portfolio Committee on Small Business Development.

In March 2021, Langa was one of fourteen EFF MPs who the Power and Privileges Committee of Parliament recommended a sanction of a fine not exceeding the equivalent of one month's salary and allowances for disrupting Minister Pravin Gordhan's budget vote speech on 11 July 2019.

Langa resigned from Parliament with effect from 3 February 2023.

On 10 March 2023, Langa was welcomed into the Inkatha Freedom Party after he had resigned from the EFF. Langa accused the EFF of being a corrupt and ungovernable party. He was sworn in as a Member of Parliament for the IFP in December 2024; filling the casual vacancy that arose when Sbuyiselwe Angela Buthelezi died.
