= Mothusi Montwedi =

South African politician

Mothusi Montwedi MP

Permanent Delegate to the National Council of Provinces from the North West
- Incumbent
- Assumed office 17 July 2025

Member of the National Assembly of South Africa
- In office 22 May 2019 – 15 July 2025

Personal details
- Born: Mothusi Kenneth Montwedi
- Party: Economic Freedom Fighters

Mothusi Kenneth Montwedi is a South African politician. In 2019 he became a Member of Parliament in the National Assembly as a representative of the Economic Freedom Fighters party. Montwedi is the deputy provincial chair of the EFF in the North West.

In parliament, he is a member of the Portfolio Committee on Agriculture, Land Reform and Rural Development.

Montwedi was charged with contempt of parliament in 2020.

In July 2025, he was sworn in as a Permanent Delegate to the National Council of Provinces, the upper house of the South African parliament, after resigning from the National Assembly, the lower house.
