= Sisipho Jama =

South African politician

Sisipho Jama MP

Member of the National Assembly of South Africa
- Incumbent
- Assumed office 11 June 2025

Personal details
- Other political affiliations: African National Congress

Sisipho Palomino Jama is a South African politician who has been a Member of Parliament (MP) for the African National Congress.

Jama is a lesbian feminist and advocates for LGBTQ rights.
