= Karl le Roux =

South African politician

Karl le Roux MP
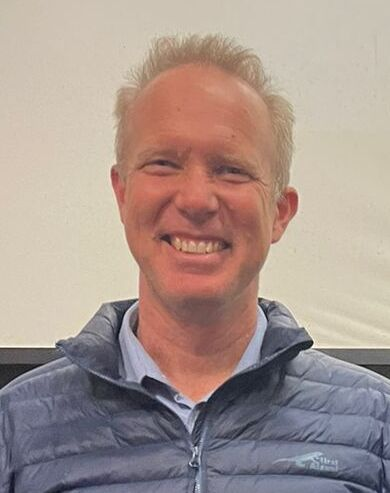
- Le Roux in August 2024

Member of the National Assembly of South Africa
- Incumbent
- Assumed office 14 June 2024

Personal details
- Born: Karl Willem du Pré le Roux; 1 December 1974 (age 51) Sweden
- Party: Democratic Alliance
- Spouse: Sally
- Education: University of Cape Town, Uppsala University
- Occupation: Member of Parliament
- Profession: Politician

Karl Willem du Pré le Roux (born 1 December 1974) is a South African physician and politician who has been a Member of the National Assembly of South Africa for the Democratic Alliance (DA) since 2024.

== Background ==
Le Roux was born in Sweden but was raised in South Africa. His mother is Ingrid le Roux, a medical doctor who founded the Philani Maternal Child Health and Nutrition Trust in Khayelitsha, Cape Town. He received a medical degree from the University of Cape Town in 1999. He later attended Uppsala University in Sweden, where he obtained a master's degree in International Health and postgraduate diplomas in Anesthetics and Obstetrics. Beginning in 2006, he worked at Zithulele Hospital in a rural area of the Eastern Cape. He served as chair of the Rural Doctors' Association of South Africa from 2008 to 2012. He is also a visiting fellow at the Center for Health and Wellbeing at Princeton University.

== Parliamentary career ==
Le Roux stood as a DA parliamentary candidate on the Western Cape list in the 2024 national elections and was subsequently elected to the National Assembly of South Africa. He was sworn in on 25 June 2024. He is a member of the Portfolio Committee on Health.
