= Edwin Baptie =

South African politician

Edwin Baptie MP

Member of the National Assembly of South Africa
- Incumbent
- Assumed office 25 June 2024

Member of the KwaZulu-Natal Legislature
- In office 30 August 2022 – 2024
- Preceded by: Rishigen Viranna

Personal details
- Born: Edwin Victor Baptie; 15 January 1957 (age 69)
- Party: Democratic Alliance
- Profession: Politician

Edwin Victor Baptie (born 15 January 1957) is a South African politician who has been a Member of the National Assembly of South Africa for the Democratic Alliance (DA) since 2024. Prior to his election to Parliament, he served as a member of the KwaZulu-Natal Legislature from 2022 to 2024 and as the leader of the DA caucus in the uMdoni Local Municipality.

== Political career ==
Baptie was the ward councillor for ward 10 in the uMdoni Local Municipality. He was appointed chairperson of the Democratic Alliance's Ugu North Constituency in 2016. He served as the leader of the DA caucus from 2007 until his resignation from council to take up a seat in the KwaZulu-Natal Legislature in August 2022.

On 30 August 2022, Baptie was sworn in as a member of the KwaZulu-Natal Legislature. He replaced former DA MPL Rishigen Viranna, who had resigned from the legislature after he was awarded a two-year scholarship to study Global Health in Sweden.

Baptie stood as a DA parliamentary candidate on National list in the 2024 national elections and was subsequently elected to the National Assembly of South Africa. He was sworn in on 25 June 2024. He is a member of the Portfolio Committee on Electricity and Energy.
