= Alco Ngobese =

South African politician

Alco Ngobese MP

Member of the National Assembly of South Africa
- Incumbent
- Assumed office 17 September 2025
- Preceded by: Petros Sithole
- Constituency: Gauteng

Personal details
- Party: Inkatha Freedom Party
- Profession: Politician

Alco Kufakwezwe Ngobese is a South African politician who has been a Member of the National Assembly of South Africa since September 2025, representing the Inkatha Freedom Party, of which he serves as the provincial secretary in Gauteng.

== Political career ==
In 2000, Ngobese was elected to the city council of the Ekurhuleni Metropolitan Municipality as a member of the Inkatha Freedom Party. He was re-elected successively in subsequent local government elections. In July 2019, he was elected to chair the council's human settlements committee.

Following the 2021 local government elections, Ngobese was appointed to head the transport planning portfolio in mayor Tania Campbell's mayoral committee. Campbell was voted out as mayor in a motion of no confidence in October 2022, only to be re-elected back to the position in November 2022; she reappointed Ngobese to her mayoral committee after her return as mayor. Campbell was removed as mayor again following a council vote in March 2023. The newly elected mayor Sivuyile Ngodwana did not appoint Ngobese to his mayoral committee.

=== Assassination attempt ===
On 31 May 2025, Ngobese survived an assassination attempt at the launch of a party branch at the Buyafuthi Hostel in Katlehong. IFP Member of Parliament Petros Sithole was killed in the attack. Ngobese said that he was shot in the head and pretended to be dead to avoid being shot by the attackers again.

On 17 September 2025, Nogbese was sworn in as a Member of the National Assembly of South Africa, filling the casual vacancy that arose with Sithole's death.
