= Leah Potgieter =

South African politician

Member of the National Assembly of South Africa
- Incumbent
- Assumed office 14 June 2024

Personal details
- Political party: Democratic Alliance

Leah Ruth Knott (née Potgieter) is a South African politician and a Member of Parliament (MP) for the Democratic Alliance (DA).

She was elected to the National Assembly of South Africa in the 2024 South African general election, where she was 65th on the national party list.

DA Spokesperson for Sports, Arts and Culture

Former Member of the Mayoral Committee for Economic Development in Johannesburg 2017 to 2019

Former Member of the Mayoral Committee for Group Corporate and Shared Services 2021 to 2023

== See also ==
- List of National Assembly members of the 28th Parliament of South Africa
