= Lufefe Mkutu =

South African politician

Lufefe Mkutu MP

Member of the National Assembly of South Africa
- Incumbent
- Assumed office 14 June 2024
- Constituency: ANC National List

Personal details
- Born: 1991 or 1992 (age 34–35) Kwazakhele, Port Elizabeth, Cape Province, South Africa
- Party: African National Congress
- Education: Nelson Mandela University (BTech)
- Profession: Politician

Lufefe Mkutu (born 1991 or 1992) is a South African politician who has been a Member of the National Assembly of South Africa since 2024, representing the African National Congress.

== Early life and education ==
Mkutu was born in Kwazakhele outside Gqeberha. He matriculated from Khumbulani High School. Mkutu graduated with a Bachelor of Technology in Industrial Engineering from Nelson Mandela University where he was a student leader in the South African Students Congress.

== Career ==
Mkutu worked for Accenture and General Motors as a business analyst and industrial engineer respectively. In 2019, he was appointed as the media liaison officer for the Eastern Cape Member of the Executive Council for Social Development.

Mkutu was appointed as the regional manager for the National Youth Development Agency in the Eastern Cape in 2022.

== Parliamentary career ==
Mkutu stood for election to the South African National Assembly in 2024 as 48th on the ANC's national list and was elected.

=== Committee assignments ===
- Portfolio Committee on Trade, Industry and Competition
- Portfolio Committee on Science, Technology and Innovation (Until 3 September 2024)
