= Nonceba Molwele =

South African politician

Member of the National Assembly of South Africa
- Incumbent
- Assumed office 2024
- Constituency: Gauteng

Personal details
- Party: African National Congress

Nonceba Agnes Gcaleka-Mazibuko is a South African politician and a Member of Parliament (MP) for the African National Congress (ANC). She was elected to the National Assembly of South Africa in the 2024 South African general election. She is the chairperson of the Standing Committee on Finance.

== See also ==
- List of National Assembly members of the 28th Parliament of South Africa
