= Moshome Motubatse =

South Afriican politician

Moshome Motubatse MP

Member of the National Assembly of South Africa
- Incumbent
- Assumed office 25 June 2024

Personal details
- Party: uMkhonto weSizwe Party
- Profession: Politician

Moshome Patrick Motubatse is a South African politician who has been a Member of the National Assembly of South Africa since June 2024, representing the uMkhonto weSizwe Party.

In July 2024, Motubatse was named to the Portfolio Committee on Health. He was also appointed as an alternate member of the Portfolio Committee on Employment and Labour in September 2024 before becoming an alternate member of the Portfolio Committee On Transport in March 2025 as well.
