= Farayi Matsa =

South African politician

Member of the National Assembly of South Africa
- In office 15 August 2024 – 9 May 2025
- Preceded by: Mzonke Tomsana

Personal details
- Party: uMkhonto weSizwe

Farayi S'fisosethu Matsa is a South African politician who served as a Member of Parliament for uMkhonto weSizwe from August 2024 until his removal for being absent without authorisation for 15 or more sitting days of the Assembly in May 2025.
