= Noma Buthelezi =

South African politician

Member of the National Assembly of South Africa
- Incumbent
- Assumed office 25 June 2025
- Preceded by: Nomado Grace Mgwebi

Personal details
- Party: UMkhonto weSizwe Party
- Profession: Politician

Noma Buthelezi is a South African politician who has been a Member of the National Assembly of South Africa since June 2025, representing the UMkhonto weSizwe Party. In 2024, she served as the spokesperson of the party's youth league in KwaZulu-Natal.

== Parliamentary career ==
On 21 June 2025, the party announced that she would taking up a seat in the National Assembly, replacing Nomado Grace Mgwebi who was expelled from the party. She was sworn into office on 25 June 2025. In parliament, she is a member of the Portfolio Committee on Tourism and an alternate member of the Portfolio Committee on Public Service and Administration.
