= Nqobile Mhlongo =

South African politician

The Honourable Nqobile Mhlongo MP
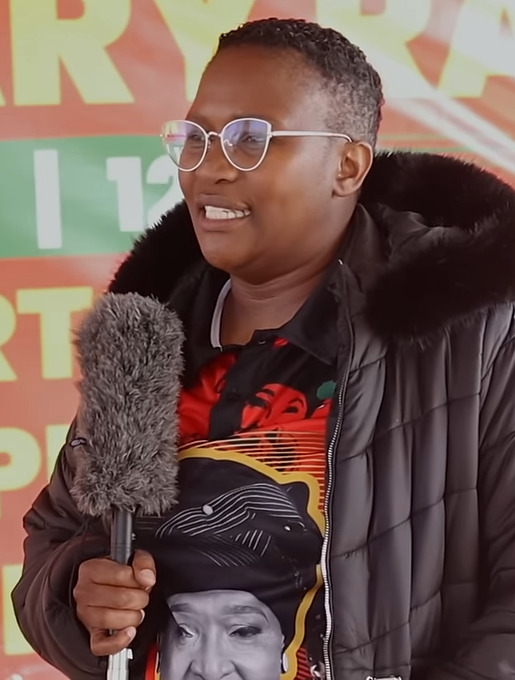
- Mhlongo in 2024

Member of the National Assembly
- Incumbent
- Assumed office 7 February 2025
- In office 1 June 2023 – 28 May 2024

Personal details
- Party: Economic Freedom Fighters
- Profession: Politician

Nqobile Matilda Mhlongo is a South African politician from the Economic Freedom Fighters. She has served as a member of the National Assembly of South Africa since 2025 after previously from 2023 until 2024.
