= Sakiena Frenchman =

South African politician and community activist

Sakiena Frenchman MP

Member of the National Assembly of South Africa
- Incumbent
- Assumed office 14 June 2024

Personal details
- Party: National Coloured Congress

Sakiena Frenchman (born 17 September 1974) is a South African politician and community activist who has been a Member of the National Assembly of South Africa since 2024, representing the National Coloured Congress, of which she serves as secretary-general.

== Political career ==
Frenchman served as the secretary of the Gatvol Capetonian Movement. She was appointed secretary-general of the Cape Coloured Congress which was founded in 2020. Frenchman was elected to the Cape Town City Council in the 2021 local government elections. After resolving to contest national elections, the Cape Coloured Congress was renamed to the National Coloured Congress in 2023.

== Parliamentary career ==
The National Coloured Congress won two seats in the National Assembly in the 2024 national and provincial elections and Frenchman was selected to take up one of the seats alongside party leader Fadiel Adams.

On 8 July 2024, Frenchman was named to the Portfolio Committee on Tourism, the Standing Committee on Finance and the Portfolio Committee on Social Development.

== Personal life ==
By 2021, Frenchman was living in Portland, Mitchells Plain on the Cape Flats outside Cape Town.
