= Musawenkosi Gasa =

South African politician

Musawenkosi Gasa MP

Member of the National Assembly of South Africa
- Incumbent
- Assumed office 25 June 2024

Personal details
- Party: uMkhonto weSizwe
- Profession: Politician

Musawenkosi Mhlabuhlangene Gasa is a South African politician who has been a Member of the National Assembly of South Africa since June 2024, representing the UMkhonto weSizwe Party.

From July 2024 to September 2025, Gasa was a member of the Portfolio Committee on Planning, Monitoring and Evaluation, when he was appointed to the Portfolio Committee on Correctional Services. He became an alternate member of the Portfolio Committee on Forestry, Fisheries and the Environment in July 2025.
