= Evangeline Freeman =

South African politician

Member of the National Assembly of South Africa
- In office 14 June 2024 – 12 June 2025

Personal details
- Party: Patriotic Alliance
- Profession: Politician

Evangeline Freeman is a South African politician, who was elected to the National Assembly of South Africa in the 2024 general election as a member of the Patriotic Alliance. She sat on the Portfolio Committee on Tourism. Freeman resigned from parliament in June 2025.

== Personal life ==
Freeman's son, Doran, broke both legs in a car accident in January 2019.
