= Philasande Mkhize =

South African politician

Philasande Mkhize MP

Member of the National Assembly of South Africa
- Incumbent
- Assumed office 25 June 2025
- Preceded by: Garatwe Agnes Mogotsi

Personal details
- Born: Philasande Mkhize
- Party: uMkhonto weSizwe Party
- Profession: Politician

Philasande Mkhize is a South African politician and a Member of the National Assembly of South Africa for the uMkhonto weSizwe Party. She was sworn into office in June 2025.

In parliament, she is a member of the Portfolio Committee on Public Works and Infrastructure and an alternate member of the Portfolio Committee on Basic Education.
