= Delmaine Christians =

South African politician

Delmaine Christians MP

Member of the National Assembly of South Africa
- Incumbent
- Assumed office 25 June 2024
- Constituency: National list

Permanent delegate to the National Council of Provinces
- Incumbent
- Assumed office 23 May 2019
- Constituency: Northern Cape

Personal details
- Born: Delmaine Chesley Christians
- Party: Democratic Alliance
- Occupation: Member of Parliament
- Profession: Politician

Delmaine Chesley Christians is a South African politician who has been a Member of the National Assembly of South Africa for the Democratic Alliance (DA) since 2024. Prior to her election to the National Assembly, she was one of six permanent delegates from the Northern Cape to the National Council of Provinces, from 2019 to 2024

== Parliamentary career ==
Christians was elected to the National Council of Provinces following the general election that was held on 8 May 2019. She took office as an MP on 23 May 2019. She was one of six permanent delegates from the Northern Cape. She served on the Select Committee on Education and Technology, Sports, Arts and Culture and the Select Committee on Health and Social Services.

Christians stood as a DA parliamentary candidate on the National list in the 2024 general election and was subsequently elected to the National Assembly of South Africa. She was sworn in on 25 June 2024. She is a member of the Portfolio Committee on Basic Education.
