= Ethel Nkosi =

South African politician

Ethel Nkosi MP

Permanent Delegate to the National Council of Provinces

Assembly Member for Mpumalanga
- Incumbent
- Assumed office September 2020

Personal details
- Born: 6 May 1967 (age 58)
- Citizenship: South Africa
- Party: African National Congress

Nomgqibelo Ethel Nkosi (born 6 May 1967) is a South African politician from Mpumalanga. A member of the African National Congress (ANC), she has represented Mpumalanga in the National Council of Provinces since 2020.

== Political career ==
Nkosi was formerly a local councillor in Govan Mbeki Local Municipality in Mpumalanga. In March 2018, she was appointed to the town's Mayoral Committee under Mayor Thandi Ngxonono; she served as Member of the Mayoral Committee for Planning and Development.

On 14 September 2020, she resigned from the council to join the National Council of Provinces, where she replaced the late Martha Mmola. She was appointed as the ANC's whip in the Select Committee on Health and Social Services in December 2022.
