= Sinawo Thambo =

South African politician (born 1996)

The Honourable Sinawo Thambo MP
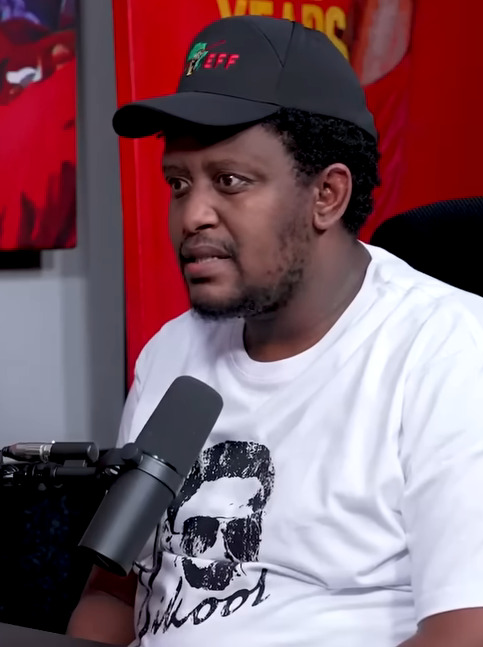
- Thambo in 2024

Member of the National Assembly of South Africa
- Incumbent
- Assumed office 28 August 2024
- In office 22 October 2020 – 28 May 2024

Personal details
- Born: Sinawo Thambo
- Party: Economic Freedom Fighters
- Education: University of Cape Town
- Occupation: Legislator
- Profession: Politician

Sinawo Thambo is a South African politician from the Western Cape who has been a Member of the National Assembly of South Africa since 2024, Thambo was the provincial chairperson of the Economic Freedom Fighters (EFF) Student Command. In March 2022, he became the EFF's National Spokesperson.

== Background ==
Thambo's family were African National Congress supporters. His father was an ANC politician. In 2021, Thambo graduated from the University of Cape Town with a Bachelor of Arts in English, Language and Literature & Politics and Governance.

Thambo had served as the provincial chairperson of the student command of the Economic Freedom Fighters. He is currently the national spokesperson of the party, having previously served as head of the presidency.

On 22 October 2020, he was sworn in as a Member of the National Assembly. Thambo was elected to a full term in the National Assembly in the 2024 general election, however, he was not available to take up his seat, so the party selected Sam Matiase to fill it. After Mzwanele Manyi resigned to join uMkhonto weSizwe in August 2024, the party chose Thambo to take up his seat.
