= Dereleen James =

South African politician and community activist

Dereleen James MP
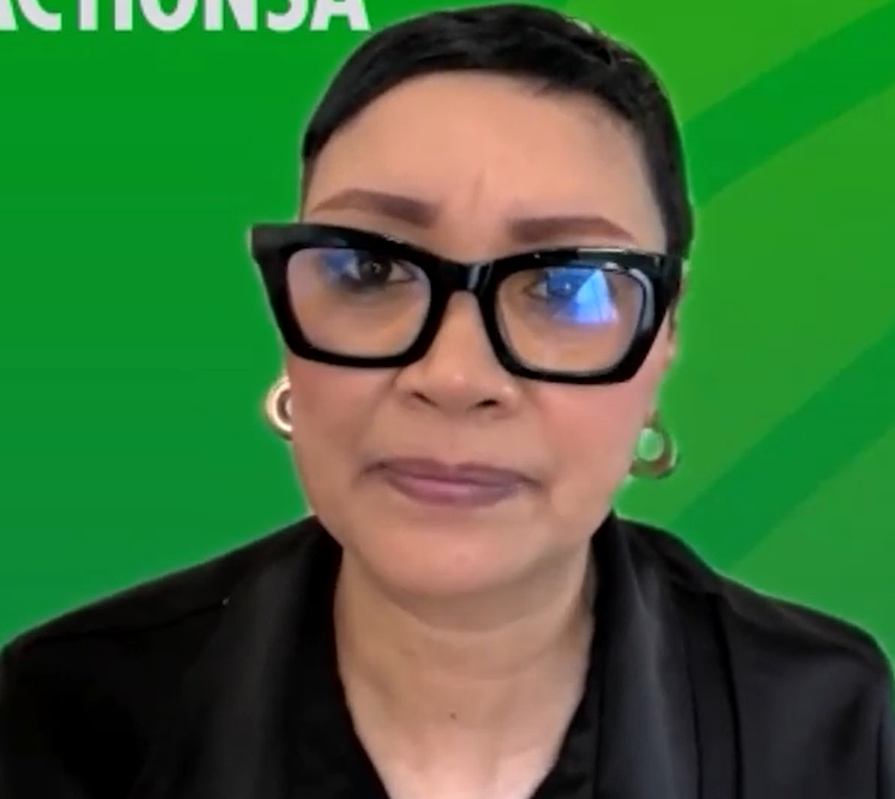
- James in 2025

Member of the National Assembly of South Africa
- Incumbent
- Assumed office 14 June 2024

Personal details
- Born: 1975 or 1976 (age 50–51) Johannesburg, South Africa
- Party: ActionSA
- Education: Chris Jan Botha Senior Secondary School
- Profession: Politician

Dereleen Elana James (born 1975 or 1976) is a South African politician and community activist who was elected to the National Assembly of South Africa at the 2024 general election as a member of ActionSA. She is the party's mayoral candidate for the City of Cape Town in the 2026 local government elections.

== Life and career ==
James was born in Johannesburg and matriculated from Chris Jan Botha Senior Secondary School with a senior certificate. She lived in Eldorado Park, south of Johannesburg. She is a single parent and has a son who had a drug addiction during his teenage years. Her son's drug addiction led to her becoming involved in community activism.

In 2013, James wrote a letter addressed to South African president Jacob Zuma called "Dear Dad", in which she asked for the government's intervention in Eldorado Park's substance abuse crisis. Her letter led to Zuma and his cabinet ministers visiting the suburb to meet with James and community members. James founded the Yellow Ribbon Foundation, a non-profit organisation dedicated to preventing substance abuse, in 2013. She was appointed as a member of the SAPS National Youth Crime Prevention Forum in 2018 and then as a member of the SAPS National Anti-Drug and Gangsterism Priority Forum in 2019. She was also a member of the Central Drug Authority.

== Parliamentary career ==
In 2018, James met Herman Mashaba, who was then the mayor of Johannesburg, at the opening of the Eldorado Park Community Based Substance Abuse Treatment Centre. She joined the party that he established in 2020, ActionSA, because she claimed that it was the only party focusing on the issue of substance abuse. She was elected to the National Assembly of South Africa in the 2024 national and provincial elections. Following her swearing-in, she was appointed a member of the Portfolio Committee on Correctional Services, an alternate member of the Portfolio Committee on Social Development and an alternate member of the Portfolio Committee on Police in July 2024. She was elected deputy chairperson of the multi-party women's caucus in October 2024. She was appointed an alternate member of the Ad Hoc Committee to Investigate Allegations made by Lieutenant General Nhlanhla Mkhwanazi in July 2025.

In September 2025, James called on president Cyril Ramaphosa to declare a state of emergency on the Cape Flats after 63 children were killed due to gun violence in the area over the past few months.

In late-November 2025, James alleged that parliament had refused to pay her expenses to attend hearings of the ad hoc committee in Pretoria. She then said that ActionSA paid for her to attend the hearings. The chairperson of the ad-hoc committee, Soviet Lekganyane, disputed her accusation by saying that parliament only covers the logistics claims of full-time members of the committee and not alternate members like James. The spokesperson of parliament, Moloto Mothapo, also emphasised the existing mechanisms available to Members of Parliament, such as the travel entitlement, that James could have used to undertake such a trip.

On 5 March 2026, James accused forensic investigator Paul O'Sullivan of lying under oath during his testimony at the Ad Hoc Committee to Investigate Allegations made by Lieutenant General Nhlanhla Mkhwanazi.

On 12 March 2026, James introduced the Zero Tolerance Corruption Bill which seeks to amend the Prevention and Combating of Corrupt Activities Act 12 of 2004. The bill proposes specific minimum prison terms based on the presiding court level for corruption related offences. James said that the bill was "deeply personal" to her.

James opened a case of intimidation against Sports, Arts and Culture Minister Gayton McKenzie on 24 March 2026, after he said "Die pad is lank", which translates to "the road is long", while making remarks about her during a Facebook live. In response to this, McKenzie opened a case against James with the Joint Committee on Ethics and Members' Interests, accusing her of breaching the Code of Ethical Conduct for MPs.

On 28 March 2026, James was appointed ActionSA's provincial chairperson in the Western Cape.

James opened a criminal case against Social Development Minister Sisisi Tolashe on 9 April 2026. She alleged that Tolashe misled parliament for failing to declare two vehicles that she received as gifts that were registered under her children. She welcomed Tolashe's dismissal in May 2026, calling it a "victory for accountability."

== 2026 Cape Town mayoral campaign ==
On 13 June 2026, James was named ActionSA's mayoral candidate for the City of Cape Town for the local government elections to be held in November 2026. James said that her mayoralty would focus on drug and substance abuse in the city's communities as well as addressing affordability and service delivery issues.
