= Makhosazana Dlomo =

South African equestrian

- Born: 2006 (age 19–20); South Africa
- Citizenship: South Africa
- Education: Stellenbosch University
- Occupation: Athletics

Makhosazana "Khosi" Dlomo (born 2006) is a South African athlete in the sport of tent pegging. She is notable for being the first Black participant in tent pegging in South Africa and the only registered Black female competitor in the sport across sub-Saharan Africa.

Dlomo has gained recognition for her efforts to promote diversity and inclusivity in a sport traditionally dominated by white, middle-class riders.

== Early life ==
Makhosazana Dlomo was born in 2006 in South Africa.

== Education ==
Makhosazana Dlomo will start a course in event planning and wine-making studies at Stellenbosch University in a bid to further her studies. She also intends to balance her studies and tent pegging the way she did in high school.

== Career ==
Dlomo's interest in tent pegging was sparked while attending a friend's birthday party in 2013. She began competing in tent pegging as a teenager.

She competed at the 2024 World Championships in Jordan. The South African team placed fifth.

By 2025, at the age of 19, Dlomo had become South Africa's sole Black tent pegging participant and the only registered Black female competitor in sub-Saharan Africa. Her participation challenged the sport's demographic norms, as tent pegging has historically been dominated by white, middle-class riders. Dlomo's involvement has been described as bringing "fresh energy, visibility, and a fierce passion" to the sport, with a mission to grow its inclusivity and accessibility.

In an interview with BBC Sport Africa in May 2025, Dlomo expressed her determination to prevent tent pegging from fading into obscurity and to make it more accessible to diverse communities in South Africa.

Dlomo said

“I think in high school I never told any of my friends; I told them I do horse riding, but I never told them what I do"

— The Citizen, Makhosazana Dlomo on her growing passion for Tent Pegging after representing SA in the Middle East [VIDEO]

== Rise to Prominence ==
Growing up in KwaZulu-Natal, Dlomo advanced quickly through the sport's ranks. She represented her province in competitions and secured a place on the South African Under-15 Girls Team in 2021. By 2024, she captained the KwaZulu-Natal Under-21 Team at the inter-provincial championship held in Lion’s River.

== Impact and advocacy ==
Dlomo's presence in tent pegging has sparked conversations about diversity in South African sports. She has been highlighted by media outlets, including the BBC and AOL, for her efforts to break barriers in a sport with limited Black representation. She has advocated for greater participation from marginalized communities, aiming to shift the perception of tent pegging as an exclusive activity.
