= Vusumuzi Nkosi =

South African politician (born 1985)

The Honourable Vusumuzi Nkosi

Member of the National Assembly

Assembly Member for Mpumalanga
- Incumbent
- Assumed office 14 June 2024

Personal details
- Born: 9 March 1985 (age 41)
- Party: African National Congress

Vusumuzi Alfred Nkosi (born 9 March 1985) is South African politician from Mpumalanga who has represented the African National Congress (ANC) in the National Assembly since June 2024. He was elected to his parliamentary seat in the May 2024 general election, ranked ninth on the ANC's party list in Mpumalanga, and sits on the Portfolio Committee on Electricity and Energy and Portfolio Committee on Science, Technology and Innovation.
