= Alan Beesley =

South African politician

Member of the National Assembly of South Africa
- Incumbent
- Assumed office 2024
- Constituency: National List

Personal details
- Party: ActionSA
- Education: University of KwaZulu-Natal

Alan David Beesley is a South African politician and member of Parliament (MP) for ActionSA. He was elected to the National Assembly of South Africa in the 2024 South African general election.

== See also ==
- List of National Assembly members of the 28th Parliament of South Africa
