= Oziel Hlalele Motaung =

Mosotho politician

Oziel Hlalele Motaung was a member of the Pan-African Parliament and minister of sports and agriculture from Lesotho.
