= Nhlanhla Hadebe =

South African politician

Nhlanhla Hadebe MP

Permanent Delegate to the National Council of Provinces from KwaZulu-Natal
- Incumbent
- Assumed office 14 February 2022
- Preceded by: Xolani Ngwezi

Personal details
- Born: Nhlanhla Mzungezwa Hadebe
- Party: Inkatha Freedom Party
- Profession: Politician

Nhlanhla Mzungezwa Hadebe is a South African politician who has served as a permanent delegate to the National Council of Provinces from KwaZulu-Natal since 2022. Hadebe is a member of the Inkatha Freedom Party.

== Background ==
As a member of the Inkatha Freedom Party, Hadebe held various roles in local government. He was also a member of the IFP Youth Brigade, the party's KwaZulu-Natal Provincial Executive Committee, and the party's National Executive Committee.

== Parliamentary career ==
On 8 February 2022, the IFP announced that Hadebe would be taking up Xolani Ngwezi's seat in the National Council of Provinces after Ngwezi resigned to become mayor of the uMhlathuze Local Municipality. The KwaZulu-Natal Legislature elected him as a permanent delegate to the NCOP on 10 February. Hadebe was sworn in as a member of the NCOP on 14 February 2022. He is a member of the Select Committee on Cooperative Governance and Traditional Affairs, Water and Sanitation and Human Settlements, the Select Committee on Security and Justice and the Select Committee on Petitions and Executive Undertakings.
