= Katrina De Bruin =

South African politician

Katrina de Bruin

Member of the National Assembly of South Africa
- In office 14 June 2024 – 23 October 2024

Personal details
- Party: Patriotic Alliance
- Profession: Politician

Katrina De Bruin is a South African politician who has been a councillor in Bitou Local Municipality since October 2024, representing the Patriotic Alliance. De Bruin had previously served as a Member of the National Assembly of South Africa from June until October 2024.

== Political career ==
De Bruin was elected to the National Assembly of South Africa in the 2024 general election, having been ranked second on the Patriotic Alliance's candidate list. She was a member of the Portfolio Committee on Social Development during her tenure in parliament.

On 23 October 2024, De Bruin resigned from the National Assembly, and was sworn in as a councillor for the PA in the Bitou Local Municipality, replacing Hein Mitchell, who was expelled from the party.
