= Marlon Daniels =

South African politician

Marlon Daniels MP

Member of the National Assembly of South Africa
- Incumbent
- Assumed office 27 November 2024
- Constituency: Eastern Cape

Personal details
- Profession: Politician

Marlon Vivienne Daniels is a South African politician who has been a Member of the National Assembly of South Africa since 2024, representing the Patriotic Alliance, of which he serves as national chairperson.

== Political career ==
Daniels is from the Northern Areas of Gqeberha. He was elected to the Nelson Mandela Bay municipal council in 2016 as the Patriotic Alliance won one proportional representation seat.

In August 2017, Daniels was appointed as the member of the Mayoral Committee responsible for Public Health by Mayor Athol Trollip. He did not serve in the position for long as the PA announced its withdrawal from the coalition the following month due to a dispute over which party would get the position of deputy mayor. He returned to the mayoral committee in June 2019 after mayor Mongameli Bobani appointed him MMC for economic development, tourism and agriculture. Daniels was not on the PA list for the 2021 municipal elections and left council.

In October 2022, Daniels was sworn in as a councillor of the Sol Plaatje Local Municipality. After his swearing-in, he said that he had apologised to the minister of basic education Angie Motshekga for a second time after he called her a "bitch".

After the resignations of multiple Patriotic Alliance MPs in October 2024, Daniels was sworn in as a member of the National Assembly of South Africa in November 2024.
