= Nthako Matiase =

South African politician

Nthako Matiase MP
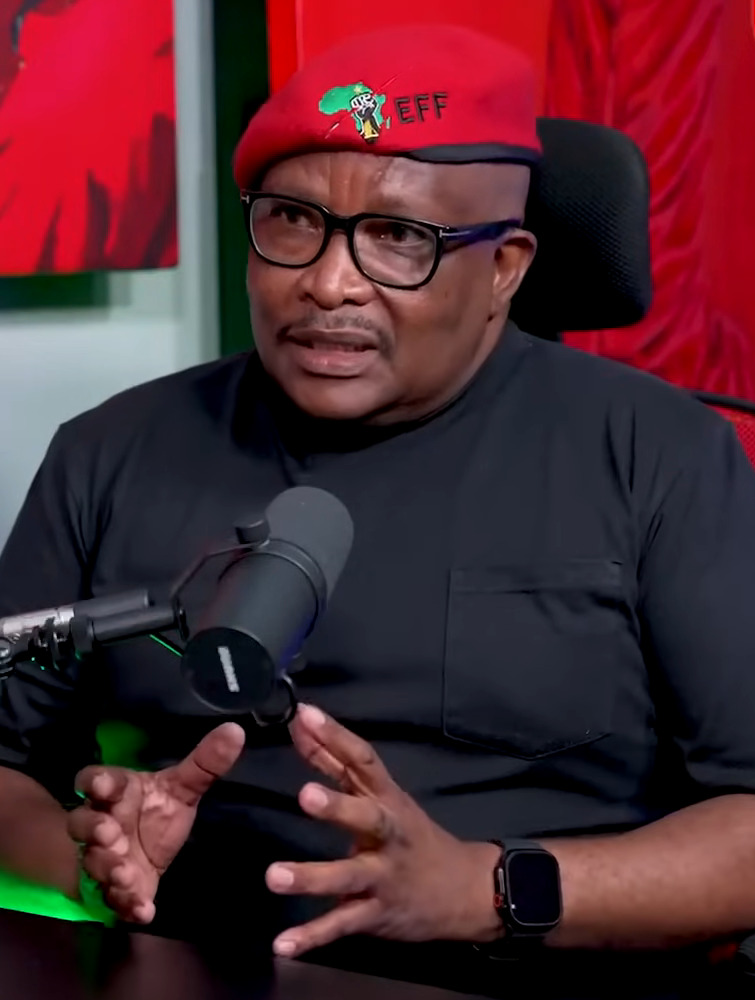
- Matiase in January 2024

Member of the National Assembly of South Africa
- Incumbent
- Assumed office 21 May 2014
- Constituency: Eastern Cape

Personal details
- Born: Nthako Sam Matiase
- Party: Economic Freedom Fighters

Nthako Sam Matiase is a member of the National Assembly of South Africa. He is a member of the Economic Freedom Fighters.

== Political career ==
A member of the Economic Freedom Fighters party, Matiase entered the National Assembly on 21 May 2014 as a replacement for Khumbuza Bavu.

During his first term, he was a member of numerous committees, including the Portfolio Committee on Health, the Portfolio Committee on Justice and Correctional Services and the Portfolio Committee on Rural Development and Land Reform. He was also an alternate member of the Portfolio Committee on Health, the Standing Committee on Finance and the Portfolio Committee on Justice and Correctional Services.

Matiase was re-elected in the 2019 and the 2024 general election. He is currently a member of both the Portfolio Committee on Agriculture, Land Reform and Rural Development and the Joint Standing Committee on Defence.
