= Wesley Douglas (politician) =

South African politician

Wesley Douglas is a South African politician. He was a Member of parliament for the African Christian Democratic Party in the Parliament of South Africa from 2007 until 2009, but joined the African National Congress in 2013.

He was elected as a member of the National Assembly, representing the UMkhonto we Sizwe, in the 2024 South African general election.
