= Filicity Rorke =

South African politician

Member of the National Assembly of South Africa
- In office 14 June 2024 – 12 June 2025

Personal details
- Party: Patriotic Alliance

Filicity Susan Rorke is a South African politician who was elected to the National Assembly of South Africa in the 2024 general election as a member of the Patriotic Alliance. In parliament, she sat on the Portfolio Committee on Employment and Labour. She resigned from parliament on 12 June 2025.
