= Hazel Mbele =

South African politician

Hazel Mbele MP

Member of the National Assembly of South Africa
- Incumbent
- Assumed office 25 June 2024

Personal details
- Party: uMkhonto weSizwe Party
- Profession: Politician

Hazel Htombenhle Mbele is a South African politician and a Member of the National Assembly of South Africa for the uMkhonto weSizwe Party. She was elected in the 2024 general election and sworn into office in June 2024.

In July 2024, she was appointed to serve on the Portfolio Committee on Sport, Arts and Culture and the Portfolio Committee on Employment and Labour. Her membership of the Portfolio Committee on Sport, Arts and Culture was downgraded to alternate membership in November 2024, before she left the committee in July 2025, when she was appointed as an alternate member of the Portfolio Committee on Small Business Development.

As the National Assembly revived motion aimed at investigating the statutory rape of young girls in July 2025, Mbele said that the motion should not only be up for debate and should be declared a national emergency. She further said the Sexual Offences Amendment Act was as good as its enforcement.
