= Stacey-Lee Khojane =

South African politician and internet personality (b. 1990)

Member of the National Assembly of South Africa
- In office 14 June 2024 – 1 November 2024

Personal details
- Born: 29 May 1990 (age 36)
- Party: Patriotic Alliance
- Profession: Politician

TikTok information
- Page: dj_stacey
- Followers: 225,5 thousand

Stacey-Lee Gaby Khojane (born 29 May 1990) is a South African politician and internet personality who served as a Member of the National Assembly of South Africa for the Patriotic Alliance from June until November 2024.

== Biography ==
Khojane is from Kimberley in the Northern Cape. She holds an honours degree in health communications from the University of the Free State. She worked for the university before her election to the National Assembly.

== Parliamentary career ==
Khojane joined the Patriotic Alliance and was a parliamentary candidate for the party in the 2024 general election. She was elected to the National Assembly as the party won 9 seats. She was a member of the Portfolio Committee on Cooperative Governance and Traditional Affairs, the Portfolio Committee on Higher Education and the Portfolio Committee on Home Affairs during her time in parliament/

Khojane was one of four PA MPs who resigned from parliament between 23 October and 1 November 2024. The party said that it was a "strategic move" ahead of the 2026 local government elections.
