= Anthony Matumba =

South African politician

Anthony Matumba MP
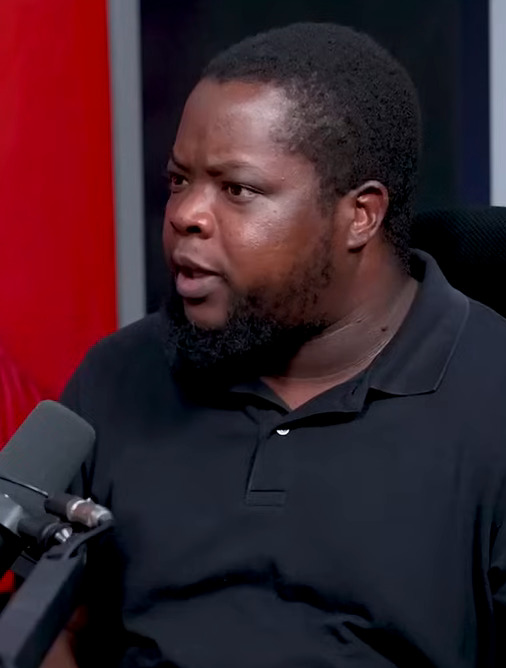
- Matumba in 2024

Member of the National Assembly of South Africa
- Incumbent
- Assumed office 26 January 2022
- Preceded by: Patrick Sindane

Personal details
- Born: Anthony Matumba
- Party: Economic Freedom Fighters
- Occupation: Member of Parliament
- Profession: Politician

Anthony Matumba is a South African politician who has been a Member of the National Assembly of South Africa since January 2022. A member of the Economic Freedom Fighters, he serves on the party's Central Command Team, its highest decision-making structure. He is a former Makhado Local Municipality councillor.

== Political career ==
Matumba is a member of the Economic Freedom Fighters (EFF) party. In 2016, he was elected as a councillor for the EFF in the Makhado Local Municipality in Limpopo. He was elected as an additional member of the EFF's Central Command Team structure, the party's highest decision-making structure between congresses, at the EFF's elective conference in December 2019.

In July 2020, an investigation by the Digital Forensic Lab (DFRLab) linked the race-baiting Tracy Zille Twitter account used to spread disparaging and racist content and to harass black women to Matumba. It was also revealed that Matumba was receiving an income from making the hateful comments on Twitter through companies he owned and registered to which Twitter users were directed. Matumba has denied being in charge of the Twitter account. The South African Human Rights Commission (SAHRC) then took Matumba to the Equality Court after it received a complaint from a member of the public. The case was heard in court on 27 July 2021, and was postponed to August 2021 on 29 July.

=== Parliament ===
The Equality Court case was set to continue on 26 January 2022, but it was postponed to allow Matumba to be sworn in as an EFF Member of the National Assembly. The swearing-in ceremony was presided over by Speaker Nosiviwe Mapisa-Nqakula.
