= Lennox Gaehler =

South African politician

Lennox Bogen Gaehler (born 8 November 1951) is a South African politician who represented the United Democratic Movement in the National Assembly of South Africa. Gaehler is the national fundraising officer of the party.
