= Steven Swart =

South African politician

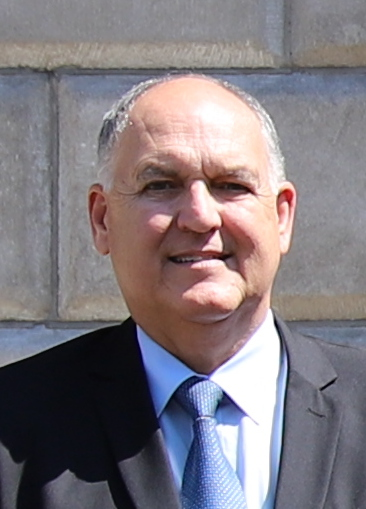

Member of the National Assembly of South Africa
- Incumbent
- Assumed office 2019
- In office 1999–2009

Personal details
- Born: Steven Nicolas Swart; 8 February 1959 (age 67)
- Party: African Christian Democratic Party
- Profession: Politician

Steven Nicolas Swart (born 8 February 1959) is a South African politician and member of Parliament for the African Christian Democratic Party. He was in office from 1999 to 2009 and again from 2019 to the present day.
