= Cleo Wilskut =

South African politician (born 2004)

Cleo Wilskut (born 27 April 2004) is a South African politician. She represented the Patriotic Alliance (PA) party in the National Assembly of South Africa since June 2024 until her resignation in November 2024. She was the 4th candidate on the PA's election list in 2024.

Wilskut was a member of the Portfolio Committee on Communications and Digital Technologies in the South African parliament.

Wilskut resigned from the National Assembly on 7 November 2024. She was South Africa's youngest MP.
