= Ntando Maduna =

South African politician

Ntando Maduna MP

Member of the National Assembly of South Africa
- Incumbent
- Assumed office 14 June 2024

Personal details
- Born: 29 May 1992 (age 33)
- Party: African National Congress

Ntando Maduna (born 29 May 1992) is a South African politician and a Member of the National Assembly of South Africa for the African National Congress since 2024.

== Political career ==
In July 2023, Maduna was elected to serve on the National Executive Committee of the African National Congress Youth League.

Maduna was elected to the National Assembly of South Africa in the 2024 general election from the ANC's national list. As of July 2024, Maduna is a member of the Standing Committee on Auditor General, the Standing Committee on Public Accounts, and the Portfolio Committee on Transport.
