= Trevor Manuel =

South African politician (born 1956)

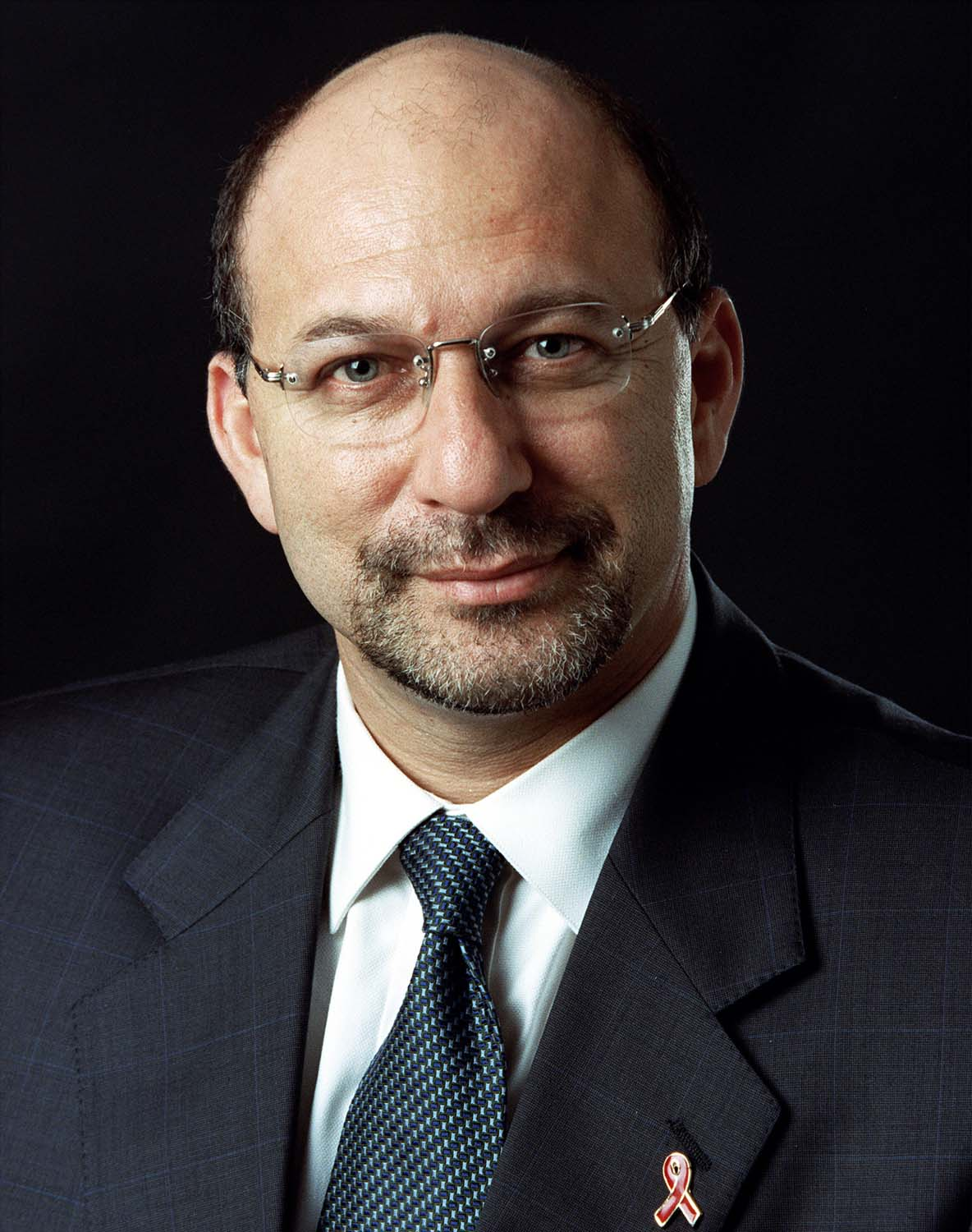
- Manuel in 2004

Minister in the Presidency for the National Planning Commission
- In office 11 May 2009 – 24 April 2014
- President: Jacob Zuma
- Preceded by: Ministry created
- Succeeded by: Ministry reconfigured

Minister of Finance
- In office 4 April 1996 – 10 May 2009
- President: Nelson Mandela; Thabo Mbeki; Kgalema Motlanthe
- Deputy: Gill Marcus; Mandisi Mpahlwa; Jabu Moleketi; Nhlanhla Nene
- Preceded by: Chris Liebenberg
- Succeeded by: Pravin Gordhan

Minister of Trade and Industry
- In office 11 May 1994 – 4 April 1996
- President: Nelson Mandela
- Preceded by: Derek Keys
- Succeeded by: Alec Erwin

Member of the National Assembly
- In office 9 May 1994 – 6 May 2014

Personal details
- Born: Trevor Andrew Manuel; 31 January 1956 (age 70) Cape Town, Cape Province; Union of South Africa
- Party: African National Congress
- Spouses: Lynne Matthews (m. 1985; div. 2007) Maria Ramos (m. 2008)
- Education: Harold Cressy High School
- Alma mater: Peninsula Technikon

Trevor Andrew Manuel (born 31 January 1956) is a retired South African politician and former anti-apartheid activist who served in the cabinet of South Africa between 1994 and 2014. He was the Minister of Finance from 1996 to 2009 under three successive presidents. He was also the first post-apartheid Minister of Trade and Industry from 1994 to 1996 and later the Minister in the Presidency for the National Planning Commission from 2009 to 2014. He was a member of the National Executive Committee of the African National Congress (ANC) from 1991 to 2012.

Born and raised in Cape Town, Manuel trained as a construction technician but was a full-time political activist from 1981, initially as the general secretary of the Cape Areas Housing Action Committee. Between 1983 and 1990, he was the regional secretary of the United Democratic Front and a member of the front's national executive. During the negotiations to end apartheid, he worked at Shell House as the head of the ANC's internal department of economic planning from 1991 to 1994.

Elected to the National Assembly in the first post-apartheid elections of April 1994, Manuel was also appointed as the Minister of Trade and Industry in Nelson Mandela's Government of National Unity. During his two years in that portfolio, he championed South Africa's post-apartheid economic liberalisation. He became Mandela's Minister of Finance in a cabinet reshuffle in April 1996 and remained in that office for the next 13 years, serving throughout the terms of Presidents Thabo Mbeki and Kgalema Motlanthe. He presided over sustained economic growth in South Africa, which admirers credited partly to the market-friendly Growth, Employment and Redistribution policy of the National Treasury. Though his critics in the Tripartite Alliance derided him as neoliberal, others described him as a pragmatist.

After the April 2009 general election, Manuel was retained in President Jacob Zuma's cabinet as Minister in the Presidency for the National Planning Commission. He oversaw the establishment of the commission, becoming its inaugural chairperson, and presided over the drafting of the National Development Plan 2030, which was adopted in 2012. He announced his retirement from politics ahead of the May 2014 general election. Since 2017, he has been the chairperson of Old Mutual Emerging Markets.

== Early life and education ==
Born on 31 January 1956, Manuel grew up in Kensington, a suburb of Cape Town. His parents were Philma van Söhnen, a garment worker, and Abraham James Manuel, who worked for the Cape Town City Council until he died when Manuel was 13. According to Manuel's "family legend", his great-grandparents were a Portuguese immigrant and a Khoekhoe woman; Manuel was classified as Coloured under apartheid.

He attended Windermere Primary School in Kensington and then Harold Cressy High School in District Six. He later said that "politics came to me" when his primary school class was halved by the implementation of the Bantu Education Act, and he was active in local civic organisations as a teenager. He also briefly joined the youth wing of the Labour Party in 1969, at the encouragement of his father, but dropped out due to "peer pressure at school" and due to his own disagreement with the party's decision to participate in the Coloured Representative Council. After matriculating, he completed a tertiary diploma in civil and structural engineering at the Peninsula Technikon.

== Anti-apartheid activism ==
From 1974 to 1981, Manuel worked as a construction technician while maintaining his involvement in civic and anti-apartheid activism. He was initially attracted by the politics of the Black Consciousness Movement, but in 1979 he travelled to Botswana to join the exiled African National Congress (ANC), in his words hoping to become "a revolutionary with a big beard and a big gun". The ANC turned him back to Cape Town, where in 1981 he became a full-time activist as the founding general secretary of the influential Cape Areas Housing Action Committee.

=== United Democratic Front ===
In 1983, Manuel was a founding member of the Western Cape branch of the United Democratic Front (UDF), a popular front against apartheid. In the same year, he was elected as the UDF's regional secretary and as a member of its national executive committee; he held both positions until 1990. In 1996, Mark Gevisser described him as having been a "solid workhorse of the UDF"; in Gevisser's description:

He's the one who, in the rough-and-tumble world of Cape Flats politics, once even punched out current Western Cape Nat MEC Peter Marais at a public meeting; the long-haired biker who used to cruise around in tight Lee jeans, studded shoes and leather jacket. He's the one who used to lead the klaberjas sessions in Victor Verster prison... he was a rough-hewn United Democratic Front street-activist.

Because of his political activities, Manuel spent a cumulative 35 months in police detention between 1985 and 1990. He was detained for the first time on 22 October 1985, held under the Internal Security Act, and released a month later under a stringent banning order. On the next occasion, he was held at Victor Verster without trial for almost two years, from August 1986 to July 1988, then rearrested from September 1988 to February 1989. Again released on a banning order, he was arrested once again in August 1989, and held for two months, after he contravened the order by speaking at a press conference in Athlone. Also during this period in 1989, Manuel returned briefly to the private sector as a policy manager for the Mobil Foundation in Cape Town.

=== African National Congress ===
In February 1990, the apartheid government unbanned the ANC to facilitate negotiations to end apartheid, and Manuel was appointed as the party's deputy coordinator in the Western Cape while legal party structures were established. He was elected as the regional branch's publicity secretary when the first regional party conference was held. However, he was soon promoted: the national ANC held its first conference inside South Africa in Durban in July 1991 and Manuel was elected to the party's top executive organ, the National Executive Committee; by number of votes received, he was ranked 19th of the committee's 50 members, receiving support across 64 per cent of all ballots cast. He was also elected to the ANC National Working Committee.

In the aftermath of the conference, he was recruited full-time to the ANC's headquarters at Shell House, where he was head of the party's nascent department of economic planning. He worked closely with Tito Mboweni, who took responsibility for trade and industrial policy while Manuel focused on fiscal policy. Because of his lack of experience in economics, Manuel's appointment received a dubious reaction from the press, from his friends, and from Manuel himself. Manuel later said that he thought he had been chosen for the department because he was ideologically "agnostic" on questions of policy; in the description of his UDF colleague, Cheryl Carolus, he "had a remarkable ability to listen, to figure out what he needed to achieve, and then to go for it without ideological baggage. He was thorough and conservative, always the voice of reason." In addition, Mark Gevisser considered Manuel a protégé of Thabo Mbeki and noted that Manuel was politically successful in the ANC because he was "one of the few people comfortable in both the ex-UDF nexus around Cyril Ramaphosa – his natural home – and the exile nexus around Mbeki".

He remained the ANC's head of economic planning until the 1994 general election. According to Gevisser, during this period, Manuel "played a critical role in guiding the ANC away from its traditional adherence to centralised planning and towards the market economy it was to espouse".

== Minister of Trade and Industry: 1994–1996 ==
In South Africa's first post-apartheid elections in April 1994, Manuel stood as a candidate for the ANC and was elected to the National Assembly, the lower house of the new South African Parliament. He was also appointed as Minister of Trade and Industry in the Government of National Unity under President Nelson Mandela. He said that his priorities would include aligning trade policy and industrial strategy; seizing opportunities "to open up our domestic market to international competition", thus reversing the isolation of the apartheid era; and encouraging long-term investments in human and other capital. He also announced in December 1994 that he would seek to strengthen competition policy to reduce barriers to entry and eliminate monopolistic collusion.

According to observers, his greatest achievement "was to take a department whose sole raison d'être [under apartheid] was to stifle competition, and make it the vanguard of a 'liberalised' market economy", among other things by embracing the General Agreement on Tariffs and Trade and reducing tariffs and other protectionist measures. However, his support for liberalisation made him unpopular with trade unions, including the Southern African Clothing and Textile Workers' Union and other members of the Congress of South African Trade Unions (Cosatu), the ANC's Tripartite Alliance partner.

During this period, in December 1994, the ANC's 49th National Conference elected Manuel to his second term as a member of the party's National Executive Committee. By number of votes received, he was ranked 17th of the 60 members elected to the committee.

== Minister of Finance: 1996–2009 ==
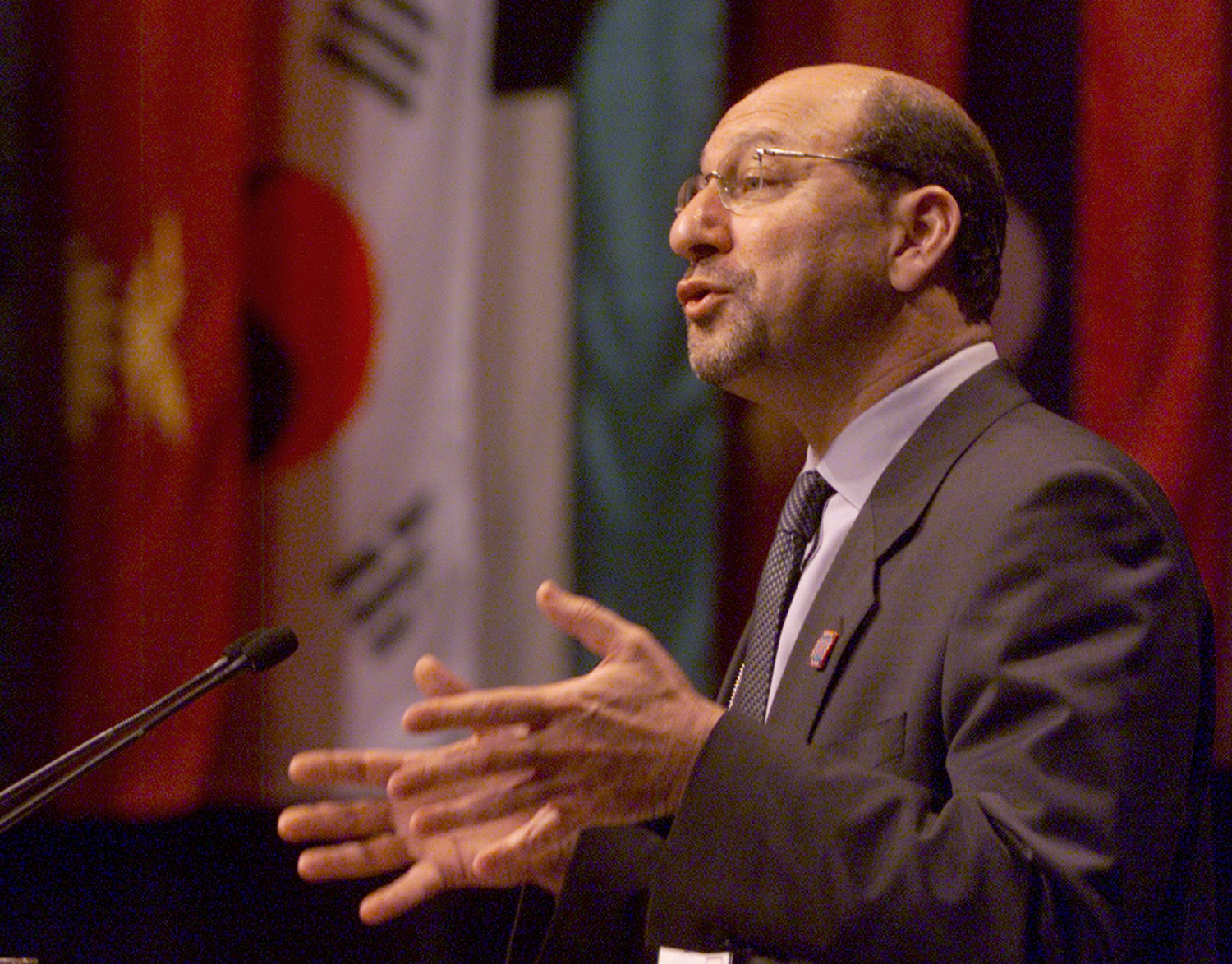
Manuel closes the plenary session of the IMF–World Bank annual meeting in Prague, September 2000

On 28 March 1996, President Mandela announced that Chris Liebenberg had resigned as the Minister of Finance and would be replaced by Manuel, with Gill Marcus as his deputy. He took office on 4 April. Manuel noted that his appointment was "something different" for the business community: describing himself, he acknowledged, "he's young, he's black, he's uppity, he's given other people shit." Despite this uncertain start, he was retained in the ministry in the first and second cabinets of Mandela's successor, President Thabo Mbeki; according to the New York Times, Mbeki's decision to keep him on was "widely applauded by the business community".

=== Economic policy ===
At the time of his appointment to the ministry, Manuel said that he was a Keynesian and did not believe that "fiscal discipline is an end in itself". However, he later acknowledged that, when he took office in 1996, debt reduction was one of the government's major priorities, as debt servicing costs were the largest budget item. According to Manuel, macroeconomic reforms were the necessary solution, because South Africa wanted to avoid becoming a "client state of anybody" and therefore to avoid heavy borrowing from the Bretton Woods institutions. Soon into his tenure, on 14 June 1996, he announced the government's new Growth, Employment and Redistribution (GEAR) programme, which was viewed as its critics as a marked rightward shift from the Reconstruction and Development Programme; GEAR targeted the reduction of the budget deficit to three per cent, more rapid tariff reductions, constraints on the public sector wage bill, and other so-called market-friendly measures.

South Africa recorded its first-ever budget surplus in the 2006/2007 financial year, and economic growth in South Africa was generally very strong throughout Manuel's tenure. His economic management won the approval of the opposition Democratic Alliance. However, leftist elements of the Tripartite Alliance vilified GEAR – and Manuel – as part of the neoliberal "1996 class project". Even those broadly complimentary of Manuel's tenure as Minister of Finance noted that his ministry had failed to address structural economic problems, particularly poverty, unemployment, and inequality. Responding to this complaint in April 2014, Manuel said:

No, I don't think finance ministers can take responsibility for all of those things... You see, one of the misplaced issues regarding economic discourse in this country is that there's this belief that macroeconomics is everything. Economists would use their own arcane language and say macro-economic stability is a necessary but not a sufficient condition. You need a series of structural policies that are not macro. And those are out of the purview of any minister of finance.

Long regarded as a pragmatist, Manuel said in 2013 that he still had little technical knowledge of economics, but "I knew that if I set this thing up where people can come with the numbers, and I ask the questions based on life experience and understanding and broad political objectives, then it will work." He was also commended for his prominent international profile; among other positions, he was Ban Ki-Moon's special envoy for development finance and the chairperson of a committee established by the International Monetary Fund to consider organisational and governance reform of the fund.

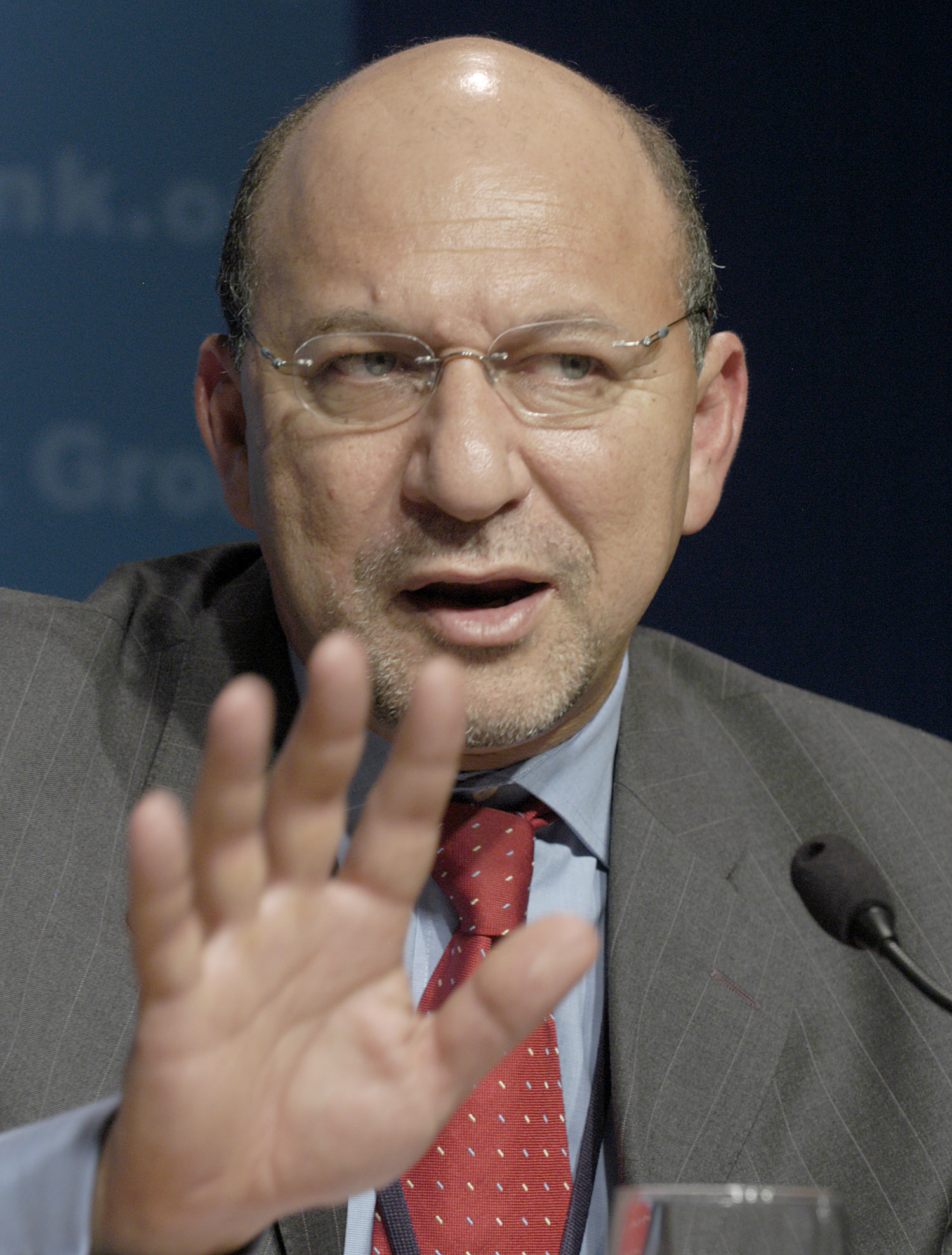
Manuel at a press briefing in Dubai, September 2003

=== ANC National Executive Committee ===
During his tenure as Finance Minister, Manuel remained a popular member of the ANC National Executive Committee. He was re-elected ranked seventh in December 1997 and ranked first in December 2002. At the December 2007 elective congress, the 52nd National Conference in Polokwane, he was one of only a handful of Mbeki's cabinet who was re-elected, in Manuel's case ranked 57th of 80. At the same conference, Mbeki was deposed as ANC president by his deputy, Jacob Zuma, intensifying severe divisions in the party. Richard Calland said that, amid uncertainty about the consequences of the upset, "the anxiety is distilled into one question: Will Zuma keep Trevor Manuel as minister of finance?"

=== Resignation and re-appointment ===
On 20 September 2008, Mbeki announced that he would resign as President of South Africa at the request of the ANC. On 23 September, his office announced that Manuel was among the 13 cabinet ministers who had submitted their own resignations in response. The rand declined in value by more than 2.5 per cent, the largest decline in four years. However, markets recovered when, less than an hour later, Manuel's spokesperson announced that he would be willing to continue to serve under Mbeki's successor. The spokesperson said that Manuel had "felt duty-bound" to resign, and he later explained that "I wanted whoever was going to take over to make his or her own decision as to who will be finance minister." Kgalema Motlanthe was elected as president on 25 September and he retained Manuel as Finance Minister in his cabinet.

The aftermath of Mbeki's resignation also saw the formation of an ANC breakaway, the Congress of the People (COPE), by Mbeki's supporters. Over a decade later, former COPE spokesperson and journalist JJ Tabane alleged that Manuel had been "in the background" during COPE's formation; Manuel strongly denied any involvement and threatened to sue Tabane for defamation.

=== Later controversies ===
After Manuel departed the Ministry of Finance in 2009, it became a target of political attacks which sometimes implicated Manuel. In August 2015, the Business Day published a document which implicated Manuel in an elaborate conspiracy codenamed Project Spider Web, apparently hatched during the post-apartheid transition with the aim of maintaining the influence of the white establishment over the National Treasury and South African economic policy. The document, of unknown origin but purporting to be a leaked intelligence report, had been circulating in government circles and claimed that other conspirators included Maria Ramos, Manuel's wife and his former director-general in the Treasury, as well as several other senior Treasury officials. The National Treasury said the document was "baseless and vexatious" and "appears calculated to sow seeds of suspicion and may be motivated by an unexplainable desire to undermine and destabilise the institution [the Treasury]". No evidence was ever provided to support the claims and no formal investigation was launched. The business press viewed the report as part of a smear campaign and an attempt to weaken the Treasury to facilitate its capture by business interests.

In October 2016, the Citizen reported, based on access to a leaked document, that Manuel had approved a R100-million modernisation contract that had been awarded at the South African Revenue Service (SARS) without a proper bidding process.

In August 2017, Manuel and his one-time Deputy Finance Minister, Jabu Moleketi, were questioned by the Hawks in their investigation into the activities of the so-called SARS rogue unit, an elite investigative unit that was alleged to have spied on politicians and citizens. Manuel was finance minister at the time that the investigative unit was established by Pravin Gordhan, then the SARS Commissioner and later Manuel's politically embattled successor as finance minister. The Economic Freedom Fighters (EFF) accused Manuel of complicity in the "rogue unit", though the allegations, strongly denied by Manuel, were considered by media as another part of the attempt to delegitimise the Treasury and facilitate state capture.

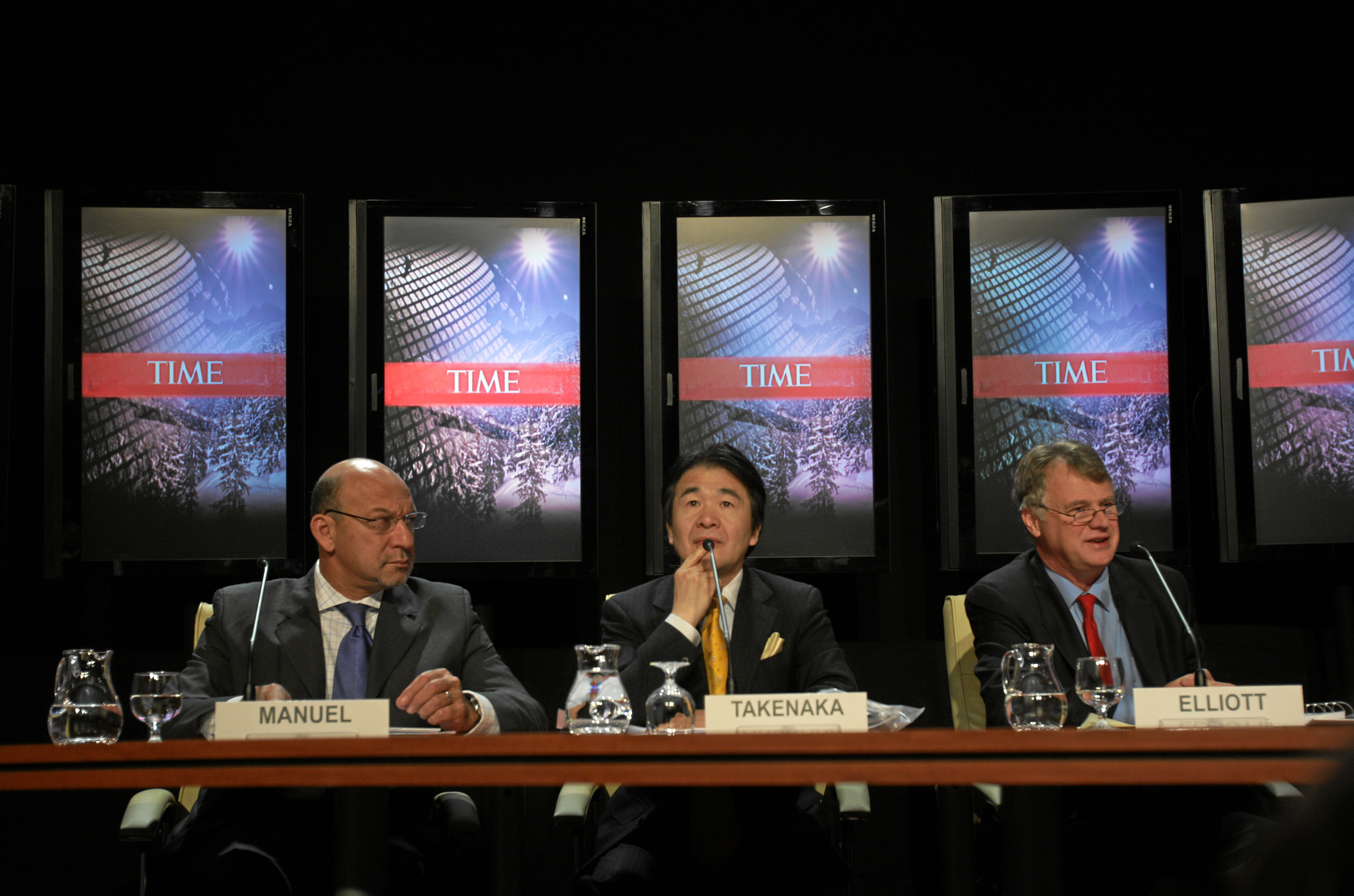
Manuel with Heizō Takenaka and Michael Elliott at the World Economic Forum in Davos, January 2009

== Minister in the Presidency: 2009–2014 ==
After the April 2009 general election, Motlanthe was succeeded as president by Jacob Zuma, who appointed Manuel to his cabinet as one of two Ministers in the Presidency. While Collins Chabane would be responsible for performance monitoring, evaluation, and administration, Manuel would be responsible for long-term strategic planning through the new National Planning Commission, the establishment of which was also announced during Zuma's cabinet announcement.

Manuel's appointment to the new portfolio was generally welcomed. However, early in his tenure, opposition parties criticised him for using R1.2 million in public money to purchase a luxury BMW as a ministerial vehicle. Manuel later conceded that the purchase was "an error of judgement".

=== National Development Plan ===
Manuel's ministry published a green paper on national strategic planning in September 2009. Cosatu called for it to be withdrawn, with Zwelinzima Vavi warning that Manuel would become a de facto "imperial" prime minister and would marginalise other ministries and the Tripartite Alliance. In particular, Cosatu was concerned that Manuel's wide-ranging portfolio trenched on the authority of the Minister of Economic Development, former trade unionist Ebrahim Patel, who it held should be responsible for long-term economic planning.

Nonetheless, when President Zuma announced the composition of the inaugural 24-member National Planning Commission on 30 April 2010, Manuel was appointed as chairperson, with businessman Cyril Ramaphosa as his deputy. The commission published a draft National Development Plan for public consultation in November 2011, and the final plan was adopted by Parliament in August 2012 and by cabinet the following month. In the remaining eighteen months of the legislative term, Manuel oversaw the government's preparations to implement the plan. During this period, he was also a member of the Oxford Martin Commission for Future Generations, chaired by Pascal Lamy.

=== Spat with Jimmy Manyi ===
On 2 March 2011, Manuel published an open letter to Jimmy Manyi, the head of the Government Communication and Information System, accusing Manyi of being "a racist in the mould of H. F. Verwoerd". The letter was a response to Manyi's suggestion that, in order to avoid being negatively affected by proposed changes to employment equity laws, Coloured people should "spread" through the provinces of South Africa to address "this over-concentration of coloureds in the Western Cape". Manuel's letter to Manyi received international media attention for its ferocity, and other ANC leaders supported Manuel, with Kader Asmal urging that, "Minister Manuel deserves the support and praise of all right-thinking South Africans. The choice facing us is very clear: do we stand behind the humane and generous values of Minister Manuel, or do we, by staying silent, lend our support to the mischievous and dangerous notions of Mr Manyi."

However, the ANC Youth League professed itself "disturbed" by Manuel's letter, saying, "We now do not know who Trevor Manuel represents, because his remarks falls squarely into the political agenda of right-wing political forces opposed to the ANC". Manuel's letter also drew a sharp response from Paul Ngobeni, who, writing in the Sunday Independent, called for Manuel to be fired. Ngobeni accused Manuel of being "a gangster of the worst kind", of acting as though he was "the king of Coloured people", and of seeking to undermine President Zuma and his cabinet through his "cowardly, unwarranted and racist attacks on Manyi".

=== Retirement ===
Manuel concluded his 21-year tenure on the ANC National Executive Committee in December 2012, when he declined a nomination to stand for re-election at the ANC's upcoming 53rd National Conference. His announcement immediately sparked speculation that he intended to retreat from public life.

In March 2014, when Parliament closed for recess ahead of that year's general election, Manuel announced his retirement from politics. He told the house that, "At some point serving leadership must give way so that new blood, fired up with life-changing ideas, can take society to a higher level of development". His decision was linked to his reduced political influence under the Zuma administration, and the Mail & Guardian concluded that he had retired "partly because he realised that, in Zuma, he did not have the kind of political backing required to implement the National Development Plan".

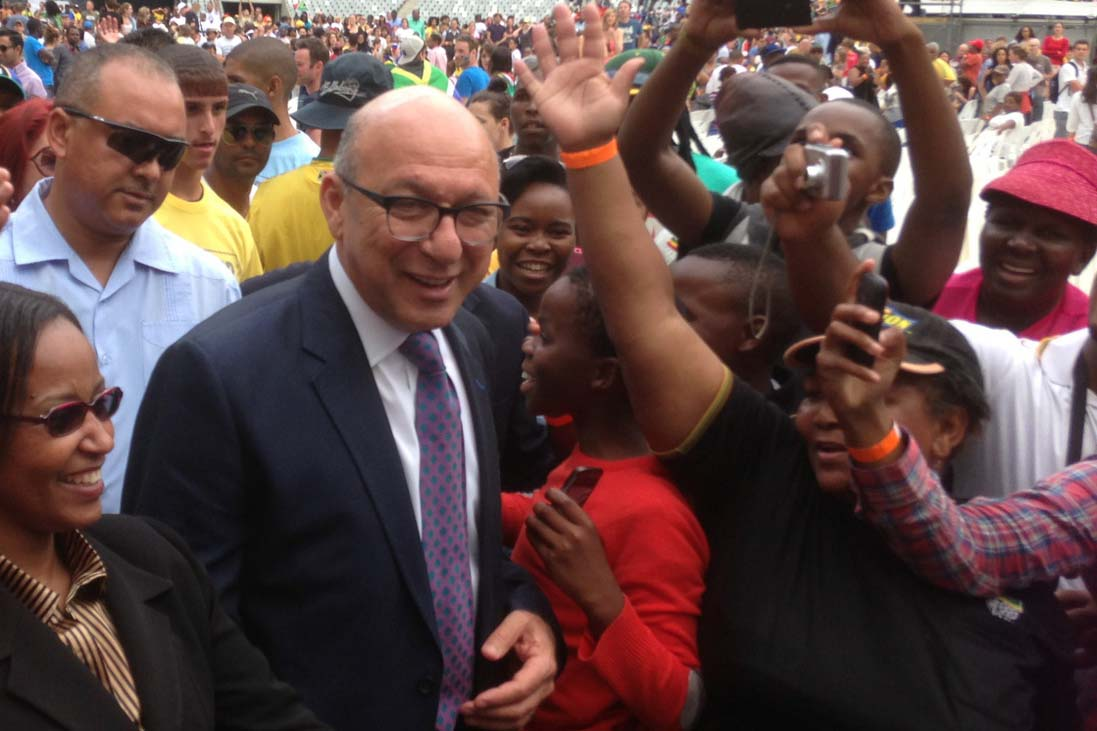
Manuel at a concert in memory of Nelson Mandela at the Cape Town Stadium in December 2013

== Later career ==
After leaving Parliament, Manuel took up various pursuits in business. On 1 October 2014, he was appointed as senior adviser to the global Rothschild Group and as deputy chairman of its South African subsidiary; in March 2017, he succeeded Bruce Hemphill as chairman of Old Mutual Emerging Markets. He also held non-executive directorships elsewhere.

Meanwhile, Manuel retained his public profile, including as a critic of President Zuma. In April 2016, in an interview with Soweto TV, he said that it would be "in all of our interests that the president actually steps aside", and he was critical of Zuma's administration during his testimony to the Zondo Commission in February 2019. Speaking on Radio 702 in May 2022, Manuel said that he had allowed his ANC membership to lapse, reflecting that in retrospect "the magic, the stance of moral leadership that had shaped the ANC throughout my youth was gone" after the party's Polokwane conference.

However, Manuel returned to public service in advisory capacities after Zuma was succeeded as president by Cyril Ramaphosa, Manuel's former deputy at the National Planning Commission. In February 2019, Finance Minister Tito Mboweni appointed Manuel to chair the panel tasked with appointing a new SARS commissioner. The EFF alleged in a statement that Manuel presided over a "nepotistic" and "corrupt" process, remarks later found to be defamatory by the Pretoria High Court. In April 2018, Ramaphosa appointed Manuel as one of his four investment envoys, and, two years later, now in his capacity as Chairperson of the African Union, Ramaphosa appointed Manuel as one of four special envoys tasked with securing international aid for Africa's response to the COVID-19 pandemic. On the latter occasion, the EFF called for the African continent to reject Manuel's appointment, calling him a "puppet" of "white monopoly capital".

In late 2024, United Nations Secretary-General António Guterres appointed Manuel to group of experts to promote actionable policy solutions and galvanize political and public support required to resolve the developing world’s debt crisis, chaired by Mahmoud Mohieldin.

== Personal life ==
In 1985, Manuel married Lynne Matthews, with whom he had three sons. They separated in 2001, beginning divorce proceedings that were finalised in 2007. At the time, Manuel was rumoured to have had an extramarital affair with Maria Ramos, the director-general in his ministry. He married Ramos on 27 December 2008 in Franschhoek.

== Selected honours ==
The World Economic Forum selected Manuel as a Global Leader for Tomorrow in 1994, and he was Euromoney's African Finance Minister of the Year in 1997. In May 2008, he was appointed the inaugural chancellor of the Cape Peninsula University of Technology, which had recently absorbed his own alma mater, the Peninsula Technikon. He served two terms as chancellor, a largely ceremonial position, before he was succeeded by Thandi Modise in 2017.

== See also ==
- List of people subject to banning orders under apartheid

Political offices
Preceded by Chris Liebenberg	Finance Minister of South Africa; 1996–2009	Succeeded by Pravin Gordhan
