= National Planning Commission of South Africa =

South African government agency

Agency overview
- Formed: 11 May 2010; 16 years ago
- Jurisdiction: Government of South Africa
- Headquarters: Union Buildings, Government Road, Pretoria
- Agency executives: Mondli Gungubele, Chairperson; Tinyiko Maluleke, Deputy Chairperson
- Parent agency: The Presidency
- Website: www.nationalplanningcommission.org.za

The National Planning Commission of South Africa is a South African government agency established in May 2010, responsible for strategic planning for the country.

The head of the commission reports to the President, and works with various ministries to co-ordinate joint priority projects that require a multifaceted approach. Trevor Manuel was appointed the first head of the commission by President Jacob Zuma. The commission is chaired by the Minister in the Presidency, heading a panel of "external experts". To avoid turf wars, it will not include Ministers.

In June 2014, then Deputy President, Cyril Ramaphosa, was appointed as the chairman of the commission with Minister in the Presidency Jeff Radebe as his deputy.

In December 2021, a third National Planning Commission for the period 2021-2026 was established, with Minister in the Presidency, Mondli Gungubele, appointed as chairperson.

== Mandates ==
1. Lead the development of a strategy for a post COVID-19 economy and society to deal with the country's triple challenge of poverty, unemployment and inequality by 2030.
2. Support strong leadership that will be required to mobilize society to promote the acceleration in implementing the National Development Plan (NDP) towards 2030.
3. Assist in forging a conversation among key stakeholders, leading to effective and impactful social compacts on a number of key issues facing the country.
4. Advise on key issues such as food security, water security, energy choices, economic development, the economy's structure, social cohesion, education, health, 4IR, public transport, industrial development, spatial planning and climate change.
5. Undertake research and building a body of evidence on critical matters for long term planning and development of South Africa. Strengthen the use of evidence and the quality of empirical data, generated from impact assessments for national planning.
6. Monitor, review and assess progress in achieving the NDP.
7. Provide evidence-based advice on futuristic national planning and foresight scenario planning to implement the plan towards 2030 better.
8. Contribute to the development of international partnerships and networks on national planning.

== National Planning Commissioners ==
The National Planning Commissioners’ roles are inter-alia, to advise on implementation, understand both the challenges and opportunities facing South Africa through research, to garner support for the national plans, to report on progress and bring together different parties to identify roadblocks and address them.

| Leadership | Office | | President(s) served |
| Leadership | Began office | Ended office | President(s) served |
|---|---|---|---|
First National Planning Commission
| Trevor Manuel (Chair), Cyril Ramaphosa (Deputy) | May 2010 | 2014 | Jacob Zuma |
NPC Commissioners for 2010-2014: Bobby Godsell; Elias Masilela; Jerry Vilakazi; Noluthando Gosa; Jennifer Molwantwa; Mike Muller; Mariam Altman; Chris Malikane; Vivienne Taylor; Marcus Balintulo; Vuyokazi Mahlati; Malekgapuru Makgoba; Joel Netshitenzhe; Anton Eberhard; Bridgette Gasa; Thandabantu Goba; Phillip Harrison; Ihron Rensburg; Jerry Coovadia; Karl von Holdt; Mohammed Karaan; Tasneem Essop; Pascal Moloi; Vincent Maphai
Second National Planning Commission (2015-2020)
| Jackson Mthembu (Chair), Malegapuru Makgoba (Deputy) | Sept 2015 | 14 Feb 2018 | Jacob Zuma |
| Jackson Mthembu (Chair), Malegapuru Makgoba (Deputy) | 15 Feb 2018 | Current | Cyril Ramaphosa |
NPC Commissioners (2015-2020): Miriam Altman; Susan Muriel Brouckaert (Bannister); Ntuthuko Melusi Bhengu; Themba Thomas Cyril Dlamini; Tessa Dooms; Tasneem Essop; Frank Kennan Dutton; Khanyisile Thandiwe Kweyama; Mohammad Karaan; Johannes Petrus Landman; Vuyokazi Felicity Mahlati; Elias Masilela; Edmund Thamsanqa Mazwai; Poppy Audrey Mocumi; Pulane Elsie Molokwane; Christina Nomdo; Thanyani Ramatsea; Dinizulu Kumalo Percival Sechemane; Dennis Jabulani Sithole; Welcome Siphamandla Zondi; Viviene Taylor; Jarrad Gregory Wright
Third National Planning Commission (2021-2026)
| Mondli Gungubele (Chair), Tinyiko Maluleke (Deputy) | 15 Dec 2021 | Current | Cyril Ramaphosa |
NPC Commissioners for 2021-2026: Susan Muriel Brouckaert (Bannister); Ntuthuko Melusi Bhengu; Welcome Siphamandla Zondi; Yacoob Abba Omar; Julian Douglas May; Pulane Elsie Molokwane; Guy Lamb; Mohammed Iqbal Jahed; Phumzile Chifunyise; Mark Swilling; Boitumelo Innocent Ramatsetse; Tshepo Feela; Tanya Cohen; Ravindra Naidoo; Hangwelani Hope Magidimisha; Sibusiso Mkwananzi; Joanne Yawitch; Lebohang Liepollo Pheko; Phakama Ntshongwana; Nikiwe Bikitsha; Mary Metcalfe; Makhiba Mollo; Tshilidzi Madzivhandila; Pearl Pillay; Morne Mostert; Mashupye Herbert
