= UMkhonto weSizwe Party =

Political party in South Africa

uMkhonto weSizwe Party 'Spear of the Nation' Party
- Abbreviation: MKP
- President: Jacob Zuma
- Governing body: National High Command
- Spokesperson: Sfiso Mahlangu
- Deputy President: Duduzane Zuma and Tony Yengeni
- Secretary General: Lindiwe Mtshali
- Deputy Secretary General (Acting): Sfiso Mahlangu
- National Treasurer: Brian Molefe
- National Chairperson: Mxolisi Phakathi
- Founded: 16 December 2023; 2 years ago
- Registered: 7 September 2023; 3 years ago
- Split from: African National Congress
- Headquarters: Johannesburg, South Africa
- Ideology: Radical Economic Transformation; Anti-imperialism; Anti-illegal immigration; Social conservatism; Nationalism
- Political position: Economic: Left-wing to far-left (disputed); Social: Right-wing to far-right
- National affiliation: Progressive Caucus
- Colors
- Slogan: Gwaza Mkhonto Gwaza
- National Assembly: 58 / 400
- National Council of Provinces: 9 / 90
- Pan-African Parliament: 1 / 5 (South African seats)
- Provincial Legislatures: 58 / 487

Website
- mkparty.org.za
- Politics of South Africa; Political parties; Elections; A: uMkhonto weSizwe self-identifies as "left-wing", and several sources refer to the party as being left-wing populist or far-left. However, due to its social and cultural conservatism, especially regarding its nationalist, anti-foreigner and anti-LGBT rhetoric, it is instead placed by some as being part of the conservative-left or as being part of the right-wing to far-right.

uMkhonto weSizwe Party (Zulu for 'Spear of the Nation' Party'), abbreviated as MKP, and often referred to as the MK Party, is a South African populist and democratic centralist political party founded in September 2023. The party is named after uMkhonto weSizwe (shortened to MK), the paramilitary wing of the African National Congress (ANC) which was active during the apartheid regime in South Africa and disbanded after Nelson Mandela's release in the early 1990s. The ANC has threatened legal action over the usage of the name preceding a loss in their electoral Court case.

The party rose to prominence in December 2023, when former president Jacob Zuma announced that, while planning to remain a lifelong member of the ANC, he would not be campaigning for the ANC in the 2024 South African general election, and would instead be voting for MKP. He stated that "I cannot and will not" campaign for the ANC of current president Cyril Ramaphosa, Zuma's successor, and that to do so would be a "betrayal".

On 21 May 2024, a week before the 2024 general election, the Constitutional Court ruled that party leader Jacob Zuma was ineligible to serve in Parliament as his fifteen-month prison sentence for contempt of court disqualified him. Although his image would remain on ballot papers, alongside his party's logo, Zuma's name would be removed from MK's list of parliamentary candidates. In July 2024, Jacob Zuma was expelled from the African National Congress (ANC) because of campaigning for a rival party (MK party) in the 29 May general election.

== Ideology ==
The party has been described as populist, Zulu nationalist, and "anti-foreigner". Voice of America called it a "radical left-wing party" in 2024, while Al Jazeera described its policies as socialist the same year. It has supported socially conservative policies, including the repeal of laws legalising same-sex marriage. The party supports controversial, ostensibly reparative policies, such as expropriating white-owned land without compensation. Writing in the Mail & Guardian, Imraan Buccus describes the party's ideology as "predatory and authoritarian nationalism with far right-wing social views". The party has linked rising immigration to South Africa with crime. Despite being a self-proclaimed socialist party, it supports expanding the powers of traditional tribal monarchs. It has been questioned as to whether or not the party is socialist.

== Party structure ==
The party has not held, and as of August 2025 has no current plans to hold, any internal elections. All top leaders are appointed by party president Jacob Zuma.

The Party's highest decision-making body is The National High Command

== Support base ==
Since the creation of the party, all opinion polling has shown it holds strong support in the province of KwaZulu-Natal, with black and coloured residents being the most favourable of the party. In early 2024, published opinion polls projected that the MK Party would cut significantly into the ANC vote within the province, and attracted a polling percentage up to 35.6%. The party also attracted significant percentages in the immediate north-western province of Mpumalanga. Following the declaration of the election results of the National and Provincial Elections, the MK Party secured 14.58% of the national votes. This translates to 58 seats in the National Assembly.

== History ==
The party has experienced infighting, with a number of resignations and dismissals, including party founder Jabulani Khumalo and others on the 2024 election list. In response to his dismissal, Khumalo claimed that he was still president, that Zuma was merely a consultant, and in turn suspended Zuma, asking the IEC to remove the Zuma's name from the candidate lists. The IEC subsequently ruled in favour of Zuma and allowed him to remain on the party's lists, noting his status as the MK Party's registered leader.

In January 2024, Black First Land First party leader Andile Mngxitama announced that he had joined the party, although he stated that BLF would not cease to exist, and that it was an electoral pact.

In July 2024, the MK was confirmed as the official opposition party in the National Assembly. The MK party replaced the Democratic Alliance (DA), which joined the ANC-led multi-party government.

On 15 August 2024, former EFF Deputy President and Parliamentary Chief Whip Floyd Shivambu joined the party. Shivambu was appointed Secretary General, but was dismissed from the position in June 2025.

On 5 September 2024, the Western Cape High Court heard arguments that the National Assembly unlawfully delegated its duty by endorsing the MK Party's nomination of impeached judge John Hlophe to the Judicial Service Commission (JSC) without independent scrutiny. Legal challengers argue this decision was irrational and undermines judicial integrity, while Hlophe and the MK Party maintain his appointment was valid. Former Democratic Alliance Midvaal mayor Bongani Baloyi has joined the uMkhonto weSizwe party on 5 September 2024.

=== 2025 resignations and suspensions ===
On 5 November 2025, John Hlophe, Deputy President of the party and the Leader of the Opposition for MK, was suspended from his role in the party following controversial leadership changes. Hlophe, in his capacity as house leader, had sacked the MK's Chief Whip Colleen Makhubele and replaced her with Des van Rooyen. This was following reports that Makhubele "had attempted to secure an MKP service-provider contract worth more than R180 000 per month for a company in which her husband is a director". Following Hlophe's suspension, Makhubele was reinstated as Chief Whip.

On 28 November, Zuma's daughter Duduzile Zuma-Sambudla announced her resignation as a member of parliament for MK following her alleged involvement in recruiting individuals to receive military training in Russia, only for those men to be conscripted into the ongoing War in Ukraine She was replaced in parliament by another Zuma daughter, Brumelda Zuma.

Duduzile Zuma-Sambudla's resignation was followed a week later by former Prasa head and current MK member of parliament Lucky Montana. Montana, who remains a member of the party, advised leadership about his intent to resign from his role in parliament on 30 August, due to take effect at the end of the year.

=== 2026 leadership changes ===
In January 2026, MK dismissed Colleen Makhubele, as Chief Whip, replacing her with Mmabatho Nthabiseng Mokoena-Zondi.

In March 2026, Zuma fired Secretary-General Bongani Mncwango and appointed Sibonelo Nomvalo. Nomvalo became the eighth person to hold the role since the party's formation in 2023. At the same time, numerous changes to the party's KwaZulu-Natal leadership were announced.

In May 2026, the party's Chief Whip, Mmabatho Nthabiseng Mokoena-Zondi, was arrested. She allegedly hired four staff members on behalf of the party, and then forced them to pay 50-60% of their salaries to her in exchange for keeping their position.

In June 2026, the party expelled Zuma's daughter, Duduzile Zuma-Sambudla and parliamentary member Nhlamulo Ndhlela. Then Secretary-general, Sibonelo Nomvalo stated that the pair had made repeated public statements and social media posts that undermined the authority of party leadership and led to factionalism within the party.

Nomvalo himself was dismissed two weeks before the 2026 South African municipal elections, purportedly for making decisions without the leadership's knowledge.

== Election results ==
The MK's performance by region in the 2024 South African general election.

In February 2024, the party contested its first election, finishing third with 19% of the vote in the ward 8 by-election in the Abaqulusi Local Municipality in KwaZulu-Natal, behind the Inkatha Freedom Party (IFP) on 47% and African National Congress (ANC) on 35%.

Later that month, the party again finished third, winning 28% of the vote in an uPhongolo by-election, behind the IFP on 36% and the ANC on 33%.

On 28 February 2024, the party contested a by-election in Govan Mbeki in Mpumalanga, its first outside KwaZulu-Natal, finishing second on 28% behind the ANC on 51%.

On 14 June 2024, the party suffered a setback in KwaZulu-Natal after the GNU run provincial legislature elected IFP member, Thami Ntuli, as Premier of KwaZulu-Natal. Ntuli won against the MK Party's premier candidate, Zulu Nation Prime Minister Inkosi Phathisizwe Chiliza, with just 41 votes to 39.

As of May 2025, the party has won six by-elections, mostly in KwaZulu-Natal.

In December 2025, The Premier of KZN narrowly survived with 39 votes to 40 in a MK-backed motion of no confidence vote after Mbali Shinga voted against the motion last minute.

=== National Assembly elections ===
Election	Party leader	Votes	%	Seats	+/–	Position	Result
2024	Jacob Zuma	2,344,309	14.58% (Note: From 2024, seats in the National Assembly are determined by a combination of the national ballot, and the nine regional ballots. Only the national ballot figures are shown here.)	58 / 400	New	3rd	Official Opposition

=== National Council of Provinces elections ===
Election	Total # of seats won	+/-	Result
2024	9 / 90	-	Official Opposition

=== Provincial elections ===
Election	Eastern Cape		Free State		Gauteng		Kwazulu-Natal		Limpopo		Mpumalanga		North-West		Northern Cape		Western Cape	
Election	%	Seats	%	Seats	%	Seats	%	Seats	%	Seats	%	Seats	%	Seats	%	Seats	%	Seats
2024	1.44	1/73	1.93	1/30	9.79	8/80	45.35	37/80	0.85	1/64	16.97	9/51	2.06	1/38	0.79	0/30	0.57	0/42
