= Sibonelo =

Sibonelo is a South African given name. Notable people with the name include:

- Sibonelo Makhanya (born 1996), South African cricketer
- Sibonelo Mngometulu (born 1969), wife of the king of Eswatini
- Sibonelo Nomvalo, South African politician
