= Duduzile Zuma-Sambudla =

Daughter of former South African president Jacob Zuma

Member of the National Assembly
- In office 25 June 2024 – 28 November 2025

Personal details
- Born: 20 May 1982 (age 44) Maputo, Mozambique
- Party: Independent
- Other political affiliations: uMkhonto weSizwe (2023–2026)
- Spouse: Lonwabo Sambudla (m. 2011–2017)
- Parent(s): Jacob Zuma; Kate Mantsho

Duduzile Zuma-Sambudla is a South African politician. She served as a Member of the National Assembly of South Africa from June 2024 until her resignation on 28 November 2025.

Zuma-Sambudla is the daughter of former President Jacob Zuma and twin sister of Duduzane Zuma. In 2023, she left the African National Congress to join the UMkhonto we Sizwe (MK) party formed by her father. She ranked 18th place on the party's national list for the 2024 South African general election. She appeared next to her father on the campaign trail and served in the inner core group of the party.

Zuma-Sambudla was sworn in as a Member of the National Assembly in June 2024. In July 2024, she was elected to represent South Africa in the Pan-African Parliament. In November 2025, she resigned from the National Assembly and the MK Party, amidst allegations relating to the Russo-Ukrainian war. She was replaced by her half-sister Brumelda Zuma.

Zuma-Sambudla, along with Nhlamulo Ndhlela, was expelled from the MK on 18 June 2026.

== Controversies ==
=== July 2021 unrest ===
Zuma-Sambudla is notable for her activity on the social media platform Twitter. She was accused by the Democratic Alliance (DA) and the African National Congress (ANC) of posting tweets that helped incite the 2021 South African unrest following the arrest of her father for contempt of court.

On 30 January 2025, Zuma-Sambudla was arrested on terrorism charges on suspicion of inciting violence on social media which had contributed to the 2021 South African unrest. She was released on a warning. Her trial began in November 2025.

=== Allegations relating to the Russo-Ukrainian War ===
A 2023 report by the United Kingdom-based Centre for Information Resilience alleged that Zuma-Sambudla was at the centre of a Russian-backed social media campaign to increase support for the Russian invasion of Ukraine in South Africa.

On 28 November 2025, Zuma-Sambudla resigned from the National Assembly amid allegations that she deceived 17 South Africans to fight as mercenaries for the Russian war effort in Ukraine through recruitment scams; the men were allegedly promised job opportunities and told that they would not be sent to war, but were sent to the front, such as in the 95482 military unit, which The Guardian reported may have taken "significant casualties".

== Personal life ==
Zuma-Sambudla was born a twin with her brother Duduzane Zuma in Maputo, Mozambique to Jacob Zuma and Kate Mantsho.
