= Nhlamulo Ndhlela =

South African politician

Nhlamulo Ndhlela MP
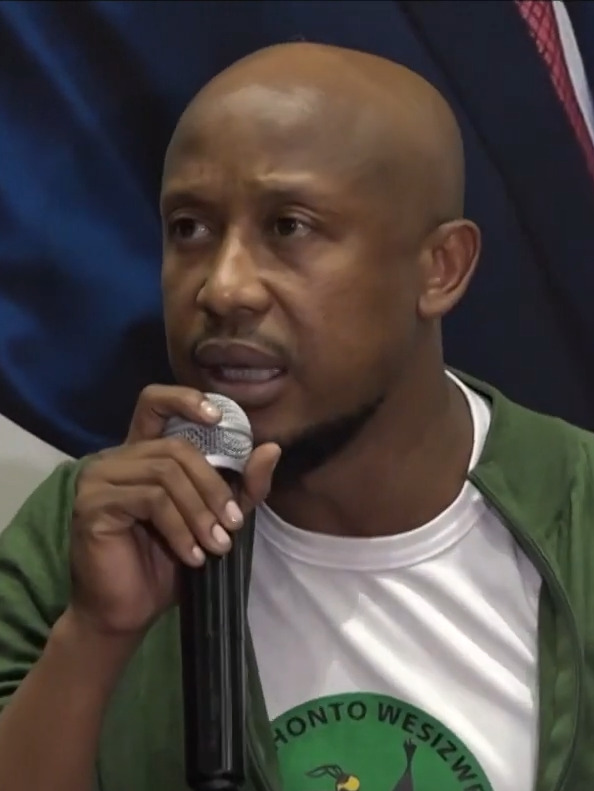
- Ndhlela in June 2024

Member of the National Assembly of South Africa
- In office 14 June 2024 – 19 May 2026
- Constituency: National list

Personal details
- Party: Independent
- Other political affiliations: uMkhonto weSizwe party (until 2026)

Nhlamulo Ndhlela is a South African politician and was a Member of the National Assembly of South Africa for the uMkhonto weSizwe party. In Parliament, Ndhlela was a member of the Portfolio Committee on Communications and Digital Technologies, as well as the Joint Committee on Ethics and Members’ Interests.

Beyond his parliamentary duties, Ndhlela was the National Spokesperson for the MK Party.

In December 2024, Ndhlela announced his intention to resign from his position as a Member of Parliament "in due course" in order to focus on being MKP's spokesperson. However, as of February 2025, there have been no official updates confirming his resignation.

As of May 2026, Ndhela has been suspended from the MK Party, losing his parliamentary seat in the process. He has been accused of misconduct, sowing discord within the organization, illicit appropriation of the organization's assets, and bringing the MKP into disrepute. He later got expelled from the party in June 2026, alongside Duduzile Zuma-Sambudla.
