= JJ Tabane =

South African commentator and TV presenter

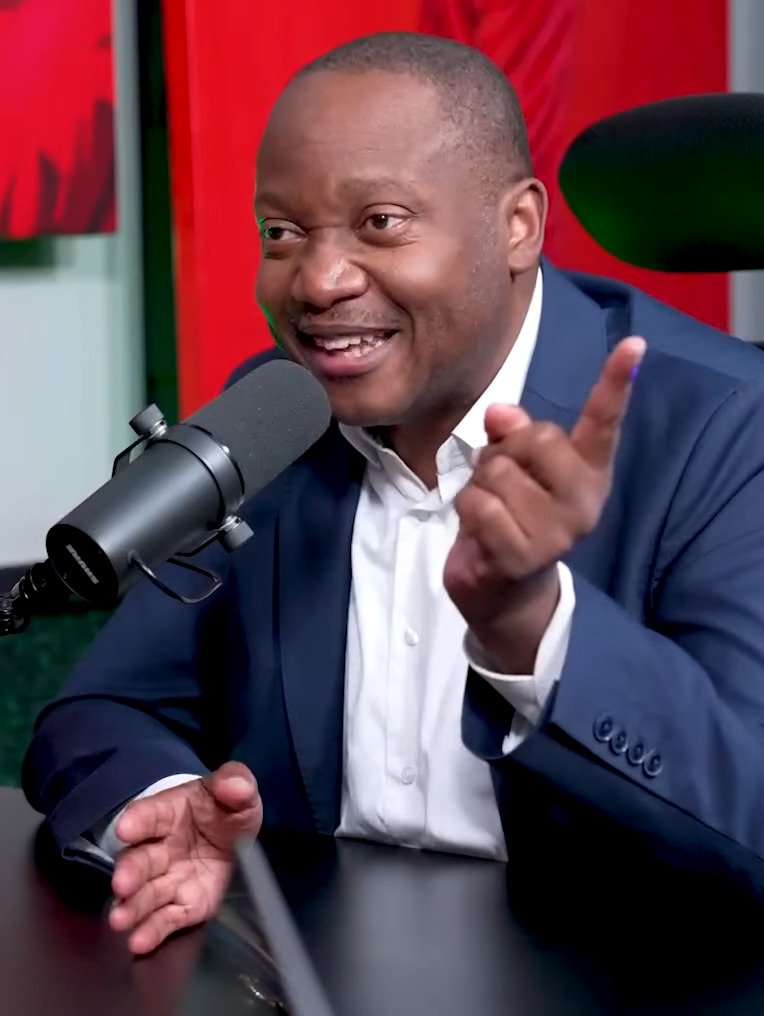
- Tabane in 2024
- Born: Onkgopotse JJ Tabane
- Education: Wits University (PhD)
- Political party: African National Congress
- Other political affiliations: Congress of the People (2008–2010)

Onkgopotse JJ Tabane is a South African communications strategist, political commentator, businessman, and television presenter. A former government spokesman, and an adjunct professor at the University of South Africa and University of Botswana. He was briefly a spokesman for the Congress of the People from 2008 until 2010, when he resigned and resumed his membership of the African National Congress.

== Communications and business ==
Tabane rose to prominence as a government spokesperson, including for South African Airways and the Department of Environmental Affairs and Tourism. He has also run a successful communications advisory business. His other positions in the corporate sector have included executive of corporate affairs at Altron and chairperson of the board at Agilitee, an electric car manufacturer.

== Congress of the People ==
In 2008, Tabane left the African National Congress (ANC), to join the Congress of the People (Cope), a newly formed breakaway party. He was one of Cope's spokespersons and later served as the political adviser to Cope's presidential candidate and parliamentary leader, Mvume Dandala. When the party became divided by a succession battle between its two founders, Mosiuoa Lekota and Mbhazima Shilowa, Tabane was aligned to Shilowa.

In November 2010, Tabane announced his resignation from Cope, writing:

It pains me to come to the conclusion that the Congress of the People has failed as a vehicle of our people's hopes for a balanced and deepening democracy. The developments of the last few months have in many ways demonstrated that we have become worse than that which we purportedly sought to oppose.

Press reports in early 2011 suggested that Tabane was among a group of Shilowa supporters who were in talks about returning to the ANC, and he was "welcomed back" into his former party in April. The following year, he was part of the ANC's communications team ahead of the party's 53rd National Conference.

In April 2022, Tabane's history at Cope resurfaced when he claimed in a podcast that Trevor Manuel – an ANC stalwart, member of the ANC National Executive Committee, and long-serving minister of finance – had been "in the background" during Cope's formation in 2008. He claimed that, "Tito Mboweni and Trevor Manuel used to fight in the background about how they wanted to be involved [in Cope]". Manuel released a strongly worded denial and threatened to sue for defamation.

== Broadcasting ==
Tabane hosted Frankly Speaking on Sundays on SABC3 until September 2018, when the programme was cancelled and replaced by Redi Tlhabi's current-affairs show. In the same month, Power 98.7 removed Tabane as the host of his radio talk show, Power Perspective, for breach of contract. Both dismissals followed civil servant Phumla Williams's testimony at the Zondo Commission, specifically her claims that Faith Muthambi, in her capacity as minister of communications, had undermined Williams personally while also seeking to undermine procurement controls at the Williams's workplace, the Government Communication and Information System. Political commentator Chris Vick claimed that Tabane, whose company had worked for Muthambi's ministry, had been complicit in Muthambi's actions. Before his dismissal, Tabane apologised to Williams on air during his Power 98.7 slot.

When Newzroom Afrika was launched in May 2019, Tabane joined its lineup of presenters. His talk show, Your View, was briefly suspended in March 2020 after Tabane said that the people of Limpopo were "higher grade" when it came to witchcraft, remarks which the channel said were "disparaging" to people from Limpopo and to their culture. In November 2020, he left Newzroom Africa for eNCA, where he launched a new current-affairs show, Power to Truth, to air twice weekly at 8 p.m.

== Writing and academia ==
Tabane is also known for his political commentary and wrote a column at the Business Day and, more recently, at the Daily Maverick. In 2015, Pan MacMillan published an edited volume of his columns as Let's Talk Frankly: Letters to Influential South Africans About the State of Our Nation.

He completed his PhD in media studies at the University of the Witwatersrand in 2020. His dissertation was about the relationship between the government and the media in post-apartheid South Africa. He was appointed as an adjunct professor at the University of South Africa's Graduate School of Business in 2022.

== Personal life ==
He is married to Nonhlanhla.
