= Chris Malikane =

Economist

- Education: PhD in Economics from the New School for Social Research, New York, US (1997)
- Occupations: Economist, professor
- Known for: Radical Economic Transformation, Economic justice

Christopher Malikane is a South African economist, academic and advocate for Radical Economic Transformation (RET). He is known for his influential role in South Africa's economic policy debates, particularly in relation to addressing economic inequality and past racial injustice. He has served as associate professor for the Wits University's school of economics and finance and also as economic advisor to COSATU and to then-Minister of Finance Malusi Gigaba.

== Education and career ==
Malikane holds numerous qualifications - a Bachelor of Science (BSc), a Bachelor of Economic Science (BEconSC), Honours Degree in Economic Science (BEconSc Hons), a Master of Commerce (MCom), a Master of Arts (MA) and a Doctor of Philosophy (PhD). In 1997, he won the Edith Henry Johnson Memorial Award for best PhD dissertation in economics at the New School for Social Research

At the University of the Witwatersrand (Wits University), he has taught macroeconomics, econometrics and portfolio theory, among other economic courses. He has served as an economic advisor to several institutions, including the Ministry of Economic Development in 2010 and the Ministry of Finance in 2017. He also worked as an economic advisor to the Congress of South African Trade Unions (COSATU) and the National Union of Metalworkers of South Africa (NUMSA).

== Economic views and controversies ==
His academic perspective is influenced by the work of John Maynard Keynes and Karl Marx. He aligns with Keynes’ view that modern economies often fail to ensure full employment and equitable wealth distribution, and he draws from Marxist analysis regarding the capitalist tendency to concentrate capital and produce social hardship. He views economics and politics as interconnected fields. In his writings, he argues that political structures determine which economic solutions are adopted, reflecting power dynamics and societal priorities. His commentary focuses on the intersection of political power and economic policy.

He is a prominent advocate of Radical Economic Transformation (RET), a controversial socio-economic policy framework within the African National Congress (ANC) that supports wealth redistribution, land reform and nationalisation of key sectors of the South African economy as a form of redressing apartheid-era economic inequalities through state-led intervention.

Malikane has argued that post-apartheid South Africa has been dominated by “White monopoly capital” which he claims holds “unfettered dominance … over all levers of power in all spheres of society.”

His views have been a source of fierce controversy. In 2017, senior South African Communist Party (SACP) figures and leftist scholars accused him of the “Gupterisation of Marxism”, arguing that his appropriation of Marxist critique was skewed to justify state capture by the Gupta family under the guise of combating capital. This is after he wrote a policy advisory document to the government titled Concerning the current Situation and which called for the fundamental shift of the economy away from white businesspeople to the ownership of the ANC-led government (nationalisation) as part of addressing racially economic imbalance created by apartheid.

Business Day and other critics dismissed his proposals as “Marxist voodoo economics,” warning that his advice risked steering South Africa towards economic collapse akin to that of Zimbabwe or Venezuela.

The Democratic Alliance (DA), South Africa’s official opposition party, was highly critical of Professor Malikane, especially during his tenure as economic advisor to the Finance Minister in 2017.

In an official statement titled Controversial Professor Chris Malikane accompanies Malusi Gigaba to the United States dated 22 April 2017, then-DA Shadow Minister of Finance David Maynier characterized Malikane’s economic ideas as “mad” and damaging to investor confidence. Although Minister Gigaba had publicly distanced himself from Malikane’s views on nationalisation and assured investors that nationalization was not government policy, the DA pointed out the contradiction in allowing Malikane to accompany him to meetings at the International Monetary Fund in the U.S.

However, Yonela Diko, then-spokesperson for the ANC in the Western Cape, came to Malikane's defence in a Daily Maverick newspaper opinion piece titled Anger at Malikane reflects fear at failed neoliberal indoctrinationon on 1 May 2017 and argued that being a Marxist or leftist does not mean Malikane was incapable of advising government on its preferred economic policy. He emphasizes that a professor like Malikane, by nature of his academic training, can argue both for and against any ideology with depth and objectivity, suggesting that the real discomfort with Malikane arises from the fact that a black academic from Wits University is openly challenging neoliberal economic thought, a university that Diko says is neoliberal elite and maintains colonial orthodoxy through its institutions and curriculum, especially the use of N. Gregory Mankiw’s Principles of Economics textbook.

Malikane himself said instead of debating the presented issues, his ideological opponents were resorting to character assassination and vilifying him.

On 30 April 2017,City Press issued a public apology to Malikane after reporting that he had suggested the use of "arms" to solve South Africa's emotive land issue following Malikane's taking the report to the country's independent media tribunal.
