= Julian Roberts (businessman) =

British businessman (born 1957)

Julian Victor Frow Roberts
- Born: Julian Roberts; 7 June 1957 (age 69)
- Education: University of Stirling
- Occupation: Businessman
- Years active: 1978–present
- Title: former CEO of Old Mutual plc
- Term: 2008–present
- Predecessor: Jim Sutcliffe
- Successor: Bruce Hemphill
- Spouse: Marion Roberts
- Children: 4

Julian Victor Frow Roberts (born 7 June 1957) is a British businessman. He was the chief executive of Old Mutual plc, an international long-term savings group until October 2015.

== Early life ==
His father played rugby for Newport and was a reserve for Wales. Roberts has a BA degree from the University of Stirling, where he played rugby for the first team.

He qualified as an accountant at PricewaterhouseCoopers in 1983, and moved into the insurance industry, working for C E Heath, in 1987.

== Career ==
He was Chief Executive of Old Mutual from September 2008 until October 2015, having joined the company in August 2000 as Group Finance Director, moving on to become CEO of Skandia following its purchase by Old Mutual in February 2006. Prior to joining Old Mutual, he was Group Finance Director of Sun Life & Provincial Holdings plc and, before that, Chief Financial Officer of Aon UK Holdings Limited.

He was also a non-executive Director of Nedbank.

== Personal life ==
He met his wife Marion whilst a student at Stirling University. They have three sons and a daughter.
