= Abaqulusi Local Municipality elections =

Local elections in KwaZulu-Natal, South Africa

The Abaqulusi Local Municipality council within the South African Zululand District Municipality consists of forty-seven members elected by mixed-member proportional representation. Twenty-four councillors are elected by first-past-the-post voting in twenty-four wards, while the remaining twenty-three are chosen from party lists so that the total number of party representatives is proportional to the number of votes received.

In the election of 3 August 2016 no party obtained a majority. The Inkatha Freedom Party (IFP) formed a government with the support of the Democratic Alliance (DA) and the Economic Freedom Fighters (EFF).

In the election of 1 November 2021 no party obtained a majority, with the IFP obtaining a plurality of twenty-one seats.

In the election of 4 November 2026, again no party won a majority. The IFP obtaining a plurality of twenty seats.

== Results ==
The following table shows the composition of the council after past elections.

Event	ANC	DA	EFF	FF+	IFP	NFP	MKP	Other	Total
2000 election	7	5	—	—	27	—	—	0	39
2006 election	10	4	—	—	22	—	—	3	39
2011 election	17	3	—	0	16	7	—	1	44
2016 election	21	3	1	0	19	—	—	0	44
2021 election	14	2	3	1	21	4	—	0	45
2026 election	8	3	1	1	20	1	13	0	47

== December 2000 election ==
The following table shows the results of the 2000 election.

Party	Ward			List			Total seats
Party	Votes	%	Seats	Votes	%	Seats	Total seats
Inkatha Freedom Party	19,877	68.84	16	20,062	69.18	11	27
African National Congress	5,262	18.22	2	5,064	17.46	5	7
Democratic Alliance	3,540	12.26	2	3,875	13.36	3	5
Independent candidates	197	0.68	0				0
Total	28,876	100.00	20	29,001	100.00	19	39
Valid votes	28,876	97.48		29,001	97.58		
Invalid/blank votes	748	2.52		720	2.42		
Total votes	29,624	100.00		29,721	100.00		
Registered voters/turnout	66,023	44.87		66,023	45.02		

== March 2006 election ==
The following table shows the results of the 2006 election.

Party	Ward			List			Total seats
Party	Votes	%	Seats	Votes	%	Seats	Total seats
Inkatha Freedom Party	19,545	54.98	13	20,111	57.25	9	22
African National Congress	9,551	26.87	4	9,678	27.55	6	10
Democratic Alliance	3,265	9.18	2	3,317	9.44	2	4
National Democratic Convention	1,207	3.40	0	1,356	3.86	1	1
Independent candidates	1,452	4.08	1				1
African Christian Democratic Party	530	1.49	0	669	1.90	1	1
Total	35,550	100.00	20	35,131	100.00	19	39
Valid votes	35,550	98.03		35,131	97.03		
Invalid/blank votes	713	1.97		1,076	2.97		
Total votes	36,263	100.00		36,207	100.00		
Registered voters/turnout	72,076	50.31		72,076	50.23		

== May 2011 election ==
The following table shows the results of the 2011 election.

Party	Ward			List			Total seats
Party	Votes	%	Seats	Votes	%	Seats	Total seats
African National Congress	19,082	38.10	10	19,506	38.95	7	17
Inkatha Freedom Party	17,639	35.22	10	17,434	34.81	6	16
National Freedom Party	8,153	16.28	0	8,231	16.44	7	7
Democratic Alliance	3,181	6.35	2	3,484	6.96	1	3
Owethu Residents Organisation	1,187	2.37	0	957	1.91	1	1
Freedom Front Plus	439	0.88	0	153	0.31	0	0
African Christian Democratic Party	291	0.58	0	240	0.48	0	0
Independent candidates	103	0.21	0				0
Royal Loyal Progress	12	0.02	0	77	0.15	0	0
Total	50,087	100.00	22	50,082	100.00	22	44
Valid votes	50,087	98.38		50,082	98.49		
Invalid/blank votes	825	1.62		770	1.51		
Total votes	50,912	100.00		50,852	100.00		
Registered voters/turnout	84,131	60.52		84,131	60.44		

== August 2016 election ==
The following table shows the results of the 2016 election.

Party	Ward			List			Total seats
Party	Votes	%	Seats	Votes	%	Seats	Total seats
African National Congress	24,663	45.50	11	25,517	46.93	10	21
Inkatha Freedom Party	22,546	41.59	9	23,202	42.68	10	19
Democratic Alliance	3,990	7.36	2	4,183	7.69	1	3
Economic Freedom Fighters	851	1.57	0	920	1.69	1	1
Independent candidates	1,657	3.06	0				0
Freedom Front Plus	500	0.92	0	545	1.00	0	0
Total	54,207	100.00	22	54,367	100.00	22	44
Valid votes	54,207	98.66		54,367	98.79		
Invalid/blank votes	739	1.34		665	1.21		
Total votes	54,946	100.00		55,032	100.00		
Registered voters/turnout	97,881	56.14		97,881	56.22		

=== August 2016 to November 2021 by-elections ===
In a by election held in March 2019 the ANC won a ward previously held by the IFP, reconstituting the council as follows:

Party	Ward	PR list	Total
ANC	12	10	22
Inkatha Freedom Party	8	10	18
DA	2	1	3
Economic Freedom Fighters	0	1	1
Total	22	22	44

== November 2021 election ==
The following table shows the results of the 2021 election.

Party	Ward			List			Total seats
Party	Votes	%	Seats	Votes	%	Seats	Total seats
Inkatha Freedom Party	19,921	44.07	18	21,175	46.62	3	21
African National Congress	13,991	30.95	4	14,193	31.25	10	14
National Freedom Party	3,438	7.61	0	3,422	7.53	4	4
Economic Freedom Fighters	2,302	5.09	0	2,456	5.41	3	3
Democratic Alliance	2,232	4.94	1	2,361	5.20	1	2
Independent candidates	1,500	3.32	0				0
Freedom Front Plus	573	1.27	0	552	1.22	1	1
Abantu Batho Congress	350	0.77	0	293	0.65	0	0
African Christian Democratic Party	248	0.55	0	255	0.56	0	0
Development of Jobs in Vryheid	215	0.48	0	193	0.42	0	0
African People's Movement	210	0.46	0	175	0.39	0	0
Land Party	57	0.13	0	106	0.23	0	0
African Mantungwa Community	72	0.16	0	69	0.15	0	0
African Transformation Movement	51	0.11	0	64	0.14	0	0
The Organic Humanity Movement	43	0.10	0	41	0.09	0	0
National People's Front	3	0.01	0	61	0.13	0	0
Total	45,206	100.00	23	45,416	100.00	22	45
Valid votes	45,206	98.58		45,416	98.67		
Invalid/blank votes	650	1.42		610	1.33		
Total votes	45,856	100.00		46,026	100.00		
Registered voters/turnout	96,719	47.41		96,719	47.59		

=== By-elections from November 2021 ===
The following by-elections were held to fill vacant ward seats in the period from November 2021.

Date	Ward	Party of the previous councillor	Party of the newly elected councillor
30 Nov 2022	13	Inkatha Freedom Party	Inkatha Freedom Party
5 Apr 2023	12	African National Congress	African National Congress
7 Feb 2024	8	Inkatha Freedom Party	Inkatha Freedom Party
16 Jul 2025	23	Inkatha Freedom Party	Inkatha Freedom Party
18 Mar 2026	7	African National Congress	Inkatha Freedom Party

After the death of the previous IFP councillor in a car accident, a by-election was held on 30 November. The IFP candidate improved the party's showing, increasing their vote share from 34% to 59%.

After the resignation of the ward 8 councillor, the resulting by-election saw the first electoral contest by the uMkhonto we Sizwe, which finished third, with 19%, behind the African National Congress (ANC) on 31%. The IFP retained the seat with 47%.

== November 2026 election ==
The following table shows the results of the 2026 election.

Party	Ward			List			Total seats
Party	Votes	%	Seats	Votes	%	Seats	Total seats
Inkatha Freedom Party	24,580	42.34	18	24,344	41.91	2	20
uMkhonto weSizwe Party	16,194	27.89	3	16,713	28.77	10	13
African National Congress	9,224	15.89	2	8,876	15.28	6	8
Democratic Alliance	3,688	6.35	1	3,775	6.50	2	3
Economic Freedom Fighters	1,149	1.98	0	1,091	1.88	1	1
National Freedom Party	1,110	1.91	0	1,084	1.87	1	1
Freedom Front Plus	1,040	1.79	0	1,048	1.80	1	1
ActionSA	194	0.33	0	220	0.38	0	0
Labour Party	161	0.28	0	146	0.25	0	0
South African Communist Party	134	0.23	0	171	0.29	0	0
National People's Front	120	0.21	0	56	0.10	0	0
Gap Fixers of South Africa	69	0.12	0	106	0.18	0	0
National Peoples Ambassadors	70	0.12	0	87	0.15	0	0
Afrika Mayibuye Movement	69	0.12	0	68	0.12	0	0
African Transformation Movement	43	0.07	0	89	0.15	0	0
Gods Justice and Development Party	41	0.07	0	59	0.10	0	0
African Economic Freedom	29	0.05	0	38	0.07	0	0
Africa Restoration Alliance	36	0.06	0	30	0.05	0	0
Organic Humanity Movement	36	0.06	0	19	0.03	0	0
Independent candidates	54	0.09	0				0
Umkhumbi Wesizwe Organisation	2	0.00	0	35	0.06	0	0
Patriotic Alliance	5	0.01	0	27	0.05	0	0
African Renaissance Unity	10	0.02	0				0
Total	58,058	100.00	24	58,082	100.00	23	47
Valid votes	58,058	98.91		58,082	98.95		
Invalid/blank votes	637	1.09		617	1.05		
Total votes	58,695	100.00		58,699	100.00		
Registered voters/turnout	112,610	52.12		112,610	52.13		
