= Govan Mbeki Local Municipality elections =

The Govan Mbeki Local Municipality is a Local Municipality in Mpumalanga, South Africa. The council consists of sixty-three members elected by mixed-member proportional representation. Thirty-two councillors are elected by first-past-the-post voting in thirty-two wards, while the remaining thirty-one are chosen from party lists so that the total number of party representatives is proportional to the number of votes received. In the election of 1 November 2021 the African National Congress (ANC) lost its majority, but remained the largest party, winning twenty-six seats.

== Results ==
The following table shows the composition of the council after past elections.

Event	ACDP	ANC	DA	EFF	FF+	IFP	PAC	Other	Total
2000 election	1	42	13	—	—	1	1	3	61
2006 election	1	42	12	—	2	1	1	2	61
2011 election	0	45	16	—	1	0	0	1	63
2016 election	—	36	15	9	2	0	—	1	63
2021 election	—	26	17	13	3	1	—	3	63

== December 2000 election ==
The following table shows the results of the 2000 election.

Party	Ward			List			Total seats
Party	Votes	%	Seats	Votes	%	Seats	Total seats
African National Congress	31,522	69.32	25	31,559	69.10	17	42
Democratic Alliance	9,402	20.68	6	9,492	20.78	7	13
Hoëveldrif Inwoners Vereniging	1,795	3.95	0	1,409	3.08	2	2
Highveld Residents Concerned Party	1,112	2.45	0	945	2.07	1	1
Inkatha Freedom Party	675	1.48	0	721	1.58	1	1
African Christian Democratic Party	253	0.56	0	716	1.57	1	1
Pan Africanist Congress of Azania	342	0.75	0	525	1.15	1	1
United Democratic Movement	124	0.27	0	306	0.67	0	0
Independent candidates	247	0.54	0				0
Total	45,472	100.00	31	45,673	100.00	30	61
Valid votes	45,472	96.83		45,673	97.37		
Invalid/blank votes	1,487	3.17		1,235	2.63		
Total votes	46,959	100.00		46,908	100.00		
Registered voters/turnout	111,470	42.13		111,470	42.08		

== March 2006 election ==
The following table shows the results of the 2006 election.

Party	Ward			List			Total seats
Party	Votes	%	Seats	Votes	%	Seats	Total seats
African National Congress	33,371	68.50	25	33,426	68.66	17	42
Democratic Alliance	9,598	19.70	6	9,547	19.61	6	12
Freedom Front Plus	1,629	3.34	0	1,559	3.20	2	2
Independent Democrats	1,308	2.68	0	1,259	2.59	1	1
Highveld Residents Concerned Party	790	1.62	0	844	1.73	1	1
Inkatha Freedom Party	648	1.33	0	617	1.27	1	1
African Christian Democratic Party	645	1.32	0	617	1.27	1	1
Pan Africanist Congress of Azania	671	1.38	0	545	1.12	1	1
National Democratic Convention	57	0.12	0	271	0.56	0	0
Total	48,717	100.00	31	48,685	100.00	30	61
Valid votes	48,717	97.69		48,685	97.67		
Invalid/blank votes	1,153	2.31		1,161	2.33		
Total votes	49,870	100.00		49,846	100.00		
Registered voters/turnout	120,834	41.27		120,834	41.25		

== May 2011 election ==
The following table shows the results of the 2011 election.

Party	Ward			List			Total seats
Party	Votes	%	Seats	Votes	%	Seats	Total seats
African National Congress	49,103	69.42	26	50,158	71.19	19	45
Democratic Alliance	17,867	25.26	6	17,328	24.59	10	16
Freedom Front Plus	1,202	1.70	0	969	1.38	1	1
Congress of the People	712	1.01	0	650	0.92	1	1
African Christian Democratic Party	561	0.79	0	394	0.56	0	0
National Freedom Party	267	0.38	0	387	0.55	0	0
Independent candidates	620	0.88	0				0
Pan Africanist Congress of Azania	212	0.30	0	300	0.43	0	0
Inkatha Freedom Party	189	0.27	0	275	0.39	0	0
Total	70,733	100.00	32	70,461	100.00	31	63
Valid votes	70,733	98.37		70,461	98.53		
Invalid/blank votes	1,170	1.63		1,050	1.47		
Total votes	71,903	100.00		71,511	100.00		
Registered voters/turnout	131,576	54.65		131,576	54.35		

== August 2016 election ==
The following table shows the results of the 2016 election.

Party	Ward			List			Total seats
Party	Votes	%	Seats	Votes	%	Seats	Total seats
African National Congress	43,198	56.55	26	43,441	57.36	10	36
Democratic Alliance	18,504	24.22	6	17,910	23.65	9	15
Economic Freedom Fighters	10,135	13.27	0	10,006	13.21	9	9
Freedom Front Plus	1,951	2.55	0	1,677	2.21	2	2
Sakhisizwe Progressive Movement	949	1.24	0	930	1.23	1	1
Congress of the People	243	0.32	0	658	0.87	0	0
Independent candidates	627	0.82	0				0
Inkatha Freedom Party	191	0.25	0	410	0.54	0	0
African People's Convention	326	0.43	0	271	0.36	0	0
Singukukhanya Kwezwe Christian Party	149	0.20	0	147	0.19	0	0
African Peace Party	58	0.08	0	204	0.27	0	0
Sindawonye Progressive Party	60	0.08	0	75	0.10	0	0
Total	76,391	100.00	32	75,729	100.00	31	63
Valid votes	76,391	98.48		75,729	98.40		
Invalid/blank votes	1,179	1.52		1,229	1.60		
Total votes	77,570	100.00		76,958	100.00		
Registered voters/turnout	145,295	53.39		145,295	52.97		

=== By-elections from August 2016 to November 2021 ===
The following by-elections were held to fill vacant ward seats in the period between the elections in August 2016 and November 2021.

Date	Ward	Party of the previous councillor	Party of the newly elected councillor
9 October 2019	108	Democratic Alliance	African National Congress

In a by-election held on 9 October 2019, a ward previously held by a DA councillor was won by the ANC candidate. The council was reconfigured as seen below:

Party	Ward	PR list	Total
African National Congress	27	10	37
Democratic Alliance	5	9	14
Economic Freedom Fighters	0	9	9
Freedom Front Plus	0	2	2
Sakhisizwe Progressive Movement	0	1	1
Total	32	31	63

== November 2021 election ==
The following table shows the results of the 2021 election.

Party	Ward			List			Total seats
Party	Votes	%	Seats	Votes	%	Seats	Total seats
African National Congress	22,287	40.31	24	23,652	41.83	2	26
Democratic Alliance	14,707	26.60	7	15,007	26.54	10	17
Economic Freedom Fighters	10,836	19.60	0	11,397	20.15	13	13
Freedom Front Plus	2,538	4.59	0	2,536	4.48	3	3
Azania Resident Party	1,154	2.09	1	1,174	2.08	1	2
African Transformation Movement	748	1.35	0	715	1.26	1	1
Independent candidates	1,450	2.62	0				0
Inkatha Freedom Party	433	0.78	0	706	1.25	1	1
Sakhisizwe Progressive Movement	276	0.50	0	249	0.44	0	0
African People's Convention	232	0.42	0	224	0.40	0	0
Singukukhanya Kwezwe Christian Party	217	0.39	0	216	0.38	0	0
Disability and Older Person Political Party	133	0.24	0	266	0.47	0	0
United Democratic Movement	120	0.22	0	122	0.22	0	0
Patriotic Alliance	101	0.18	0	130	0.23	0	0
Congress of the People	56	0.10	0	153	0.27	0	0
Total	55,288	100.00	32	56,547	100.00	31	63
Valid votes	55,288	98.21		56,547	98.37		
Invalid/blank votes	1,010	1.79		936	1.63		
Total votes	56,298	100.00		57,483	100.00		
Registered voters/turnout	141,058	39.91		141,058	40.75		

=== By-elections from November 2021 ===
The following by-elections were held to fill vacant ward seats in the period since the election in November 2021.

Date	Ward	Party of the previous councillor	Party of the newly elected councillor
23 Nov 2022	25	Democratic Alliance	Democratic Alliance
8 Nov 2023	21	Democratic Alliance	Democratic Alliance
28 Feb 2024	4	African National Congress	African National Congress
5 Nov 2025	14	African National Congress	African National Congress

On 28 February 2024, the uMkhonto we Sizwe party contested its first election outside KwaZulu-Natal, finishing second on 28% behind the ANC on 51%.
