= Chris Liebenberg =

South African banker and politician

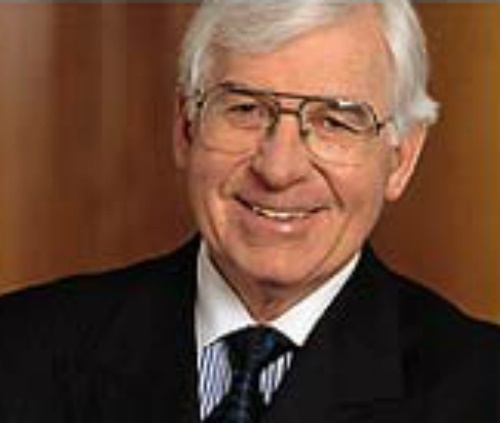
- Liebenberg in 1995

Minister of Finance
- In office 19 September 1994 – 4 April 1996
- President: Nelson Mandela
- Preceded by: Derek Keys
- Succeeded by: Trevor Manuel

Personal details
- Born: 2 October 1934 (age 91) Touws River, Cape Province, Union of South Africa
- Citizenship: South African citizenship
- Spouse: Elly Liebenberg (m. 1959)
- Children: 2 sons
- Parents: Christiaan Liebenberg (father); Helene Griessel (mother)

Christo Ferro Liebenberg (born 2 October 1934) is a South African banker who was Minister for Finance of South Africa, from 19 September 1994 to 4 April 1996, in the government of national unity chaired by Nelson Mandela.

== Early life and education ==
He was born in Touws River in the Western Cape to Christiaan Rudolf Liebenberg and Helene Henrietta Griessel. His father worked on the railway lines. Touws River was one of the biggest railway junctions of that time in South Africa. He was educated at Worcester Boys' High School, Harvard Business School AMP, INSEAD and Cranfield University.

== Career ==
He started working at Nedbank in Cape Town in 1952 as a messenger. He became the managing director of Nedbank in Johannesburg from 1988 until 1990 and became Nedbank's CEO that year until 1994 when he retired. In 1991, he was the president of the Institute of Bankers in South Africa.

Nelson Mandela asked him to take over from Finance Minister Derek Keys in October 1994. As he was not affiliated to any political party, President Nelson Mandela changed the constitution to accommodate Liebenberg as Finance Minister. As per agreement, he stayed for a certain period after which the position then went to Trevor Manuel in 1996.

After leaving government, he became a director of Old Mutual and deputy chairperson of Nedcor in 1996.

== Marriage ==
Chris married his wife Elly on 14 November 1959 and they had two sons.

Political offices
Preceded by Derek Keys	Finance Minister of South Africa; 1994 -1996	Succeeded by Trevor Manuel
