= Practical Radical Economic Transformation of South Africa =

South African political pressure group

- Abbreviation: PretSA
- Leader: Themba Sigudla; Sunday Mathebula; Bhuti Mamba
- Founder: Themba Sigudla
- Founded: 2017
- Headquarters: Emalahleni, Mpumalanga, South Africa
- Ideology: Radical economic transformation
- Political position: Economic redistribution
- National affiliation: South African National Congress of Traditional Authorities (SANCOTA)

The Practical Radical Economic Transformation of South Africa (PretSA) was a South African political pressure group based in Mpumalanga and founded by businessman and political activist Themba Sigudla with the help of then-Premier David Mabuza. The group advocated for radical economic transformation (RET), land redistribution and increased roles for traditional leaders.

== History ==
PretSA was launched in 2017 by Themba Sigudla, a flamboyant businessman and close friend of David Mabuza, at a three-day event in Witbank Dam. The organization gained prominence by promising to create "many Thembas" -referring to young Black millionaires - through state-linked business opportunities and housing projects.

In 2017, PretSA staged a protest at Kusile Power Station demanding job creation for local youth, which led to the provincial government pledging thousands of jobs. The movement also launched the "15-million voters campaign" ahead of the 2019 South African general election in favour of the ruling African National Congress (ANC) and the "Thuma Mina Housing Project" to provide affordable housing by taking over existing units, leading to legal disputes with the Emalahleni Housing Company.

In early 2019, PretSA played a key role in forming the South African National Congress of Traditional Authorities (SANCOTA), a splinter party that sought to amplify the role of traditional leadership in politics. Sigudla was instrumental in aligning PretSA’s objectives with SANCOTA’s, especially around land reform and rural development.

The supported accelerated land redistribution in South Africa, the empowerment of Black-owned businesses through government procurement and formal recognition for traditional authorities and aligned ideologically with the Radical Economic Transformation (RET) agenda often associated with President Jacob Zuma and his ex-wife Nkosazana Dlamini-Zuma. It wanted Dlamini-Zuma to succeed Zuma at the ANC's 2017 National Conference and Mabuza as her deputy

== Key people ==
- Themba Sigudla – Founder and political activist based in Mpumalanga; known for youth empowerment rhetoric.
- Sunday Mathebula - Co-founder and former chief whip of the Emalahleni Local Municipality who served as founding secretary-general of PretSA
- David Mabuza - Helped found PretSA during his time as Premier of Mpumalanga
- Eric Kholwane - ANC politician and at the time MEC of the Department of Economic Development in Mpumalanga, who was assigned by Mabuza to work closely with PretSA to realise economic development amongst youth
- Chief Mantjolo Mnisi – Traditional leader and national president of SANCOTA; collaborated with PretSA during the breakaway from the ANC.
- Bhuti Mamba - Replaced Mathebula during his fallout with Sigudla
