= UPhongolo Local Municipality elections =

Local elections in KwaZulu-Natal, South Africa

The uPhongolo Local Municipality council consists of twenty-nine members elected by mixed-member proportional representation. Fifteen councillors are elected by first-past-the-post voting in fifteen wards, while the remaining fourteen are chosen from party lists so that the total number of party representatives is proportional to the number of votes received.

In the election of 4 November 2026, no party won a majority. The Inkatha Freedom Party (IFP) won the largest number of seats on the council, with ten.

== Results ==
The following table shows the composition of the council after past elections.

Event	ANC	DA	EFF	IFP	NFP	MKP	Other	Total
2000 election	5	1	—	16	—	—	0	22
2006 election	7	1	—	14	—	—	0	22
2011 election	11	1	—	7	8	—	0	27
2016 election	15	2	1	10	—	—	1	29
2021 election	10	1	1	15	2	—	0	29
2026 election	8	1	0	10	1	8	1	29

== December 2000 election ==
The following table shows the results of the 2000 election.

Party	Ward			List			Total seats
Party	Votes	%	Seats	Votes	%	Seats	Total seats
Inkatha Freedom Party	13,184	68.29	11	13,943	72.00	5	16
African National Congress	3,906	20.23	0	4,029	20.81	5	5
Democratic Alliance	1,251	6.48	0	1,392	7.19	1	1
Independent candidates	966	5.00	0				0
Total	19,307	100.00	11	19,364	100.00	11	22
Valid votes	19,307	97.48		19,364	97.10		
Invalid/blank votes	500	2.52		578	2.90		
Total votes	19,807	100.00		19,942	100.00		
Registered voters/turnout	37,002	53.53		37,002	53.89		

== March 2006 election ==
The following table shows the results of the 2006 election.

Party	Ward			List			Total seats
Party	Votes	%	Seats	Votes	%	Seats	Total seats
Inkatha Freedom Party	15,355	62.26	8	15,189	61.48	6	14
African National Congress	7,760	31.47	3	8,120	32.87	4	7
Democratic Alliance	914	3.71	0	878	3.55	1	1
Independent Democrats	303	1.23	0	330	1.34	0	0
Independent candidates	265	1.07	0				0
National Democratic Convention	64	0.26	0	188	0.76	0	0
Total	24,661	100.00	11	24,705	100.00	11	22
Valid votes	24,661	98.16		24,705	98.24		
Invalid/blank votes	461	1.84		443	1.76		
Total votes	25,122	100.00		25,148	100.00		
Registered voters/turnout	45,135	55.66		45,135	55.72		

== May 2011 election ==
The following table shows the results of the 2011 election.

Party	Ward			List			Total seats
Party	Votes	%	Seats	Votes	%	Seats	Total seats
African National Congress	12,447	39.67	7	12,734	40.46	4	11
National Freedom Party	9,215	29.37	4	9,129	29.00	4	8
Inkatha Freedom Party	8,066	25.71	3	8,069	25.64	4	7
Democratic Alliance	1,463	4.66	0	1,394	4.43	1	1
African Christian Democratic Party	132	0.42	0	149	0.47	0	0
Independent candidates	54	0.17	0				0
Total	31,377	100.00	14	31,475	100.00	13	27
Valid votes	31,377	98.35		31,475	98.64		
Invalid/blank votes	528	1.65		434	1.36		
Total votes	31,905	100.00		31,909	100.00		
Registered voters/turnout	51,808	61.58		51,808	61.59		

== August 2016 election ==
The following table shows the results of the 2016 election.

Party	Ward			List			Total seats
Party	Votes	%	Seats	Votes	%	Seats	Total seats
African National Congress	18,608	53.74	12	19,035	55.05	3	15
Inkatha Freedom Party	12,123	35.01	2	12,429	35.95	8	10
Democratic Alliance	2,070	5.98	0	2,140	6.19	2	2
Economic Freedom Fighters	665	1.92	0	796	2.30	1	1
Independent candidates	977	2.82	1				1
African Christian Democratic Party	183	0.53	0	175	0.51	0	0
Total	34,626	100.00	15	34,575	100.00	14	29
Valid votes	34,626	98.11		34,575	98.11		
Invalid/blank votes	668	1.89		665	1.89		
Total votes	35,294	100.00		35,240	100.00		
Registered voters/turnout	59,884	58.94		59,884	58.85		

== November 2021 election ==
The following table shows the results of the 2021 election.

Party	Ward			List			Total seats
Party	Votes	%	Seats	Votes	%	Seats	Total seats
Inkatha Freedom Party	16,592	48.39	13	17,896	51.65	2	15
African National Congress	11,499	33.54	2	11,872	34.27	8	10
National Freedom Party	1,428	4.16	0	1,631	4.71	2	2
Democratic Alliance	1,348	3.93	0	1,358	3.92	1	1
Economic Freedom Fighters	1,138	3.32	0	1,221	3.52	1	1
Independent candidates	1,644	4.79	0				0
African Christian Democratic Party	164	0.48	0	193	0.56	0	0
National People's Front	134	0.39	0	148	0.43	0	0
Pongola People's Party	100	0.29	0	138	0.40	0	0
African People's Convention	79	0.23	0	73	0.21	0	0
African Mantungwa Community	50	0.15	0	34	0.10	0	0
Abantu Batho Congress	29	0.08	0	37	0.11	0	0
African Transformation Movement	20	0.06	0	31	0.09	0	0
African People's Movement	30	0.09	0	15	0.04	0	0
United Christian Democratic Party	33	0.10	0				0
Total	34,288	100.00	15	34,647	100.00	14	29
Valid votes	34,288	98.53		34,647	98.62		
Invalid/blank votes	513	1.47		484	1.38		
Total votes	34,801	100.00		35,131	100.00		
Registered voters/turnout	64,045	54.34		64,045	54.85		

=== By-elections from November 2021 ===
The following by-elections were held to fill vacant ward seats in the period from November 2021.

Date	Ward	Party of the previous councillor	Party of the newly elected councillor
14 February 2024	2	Inkatha Freedom Party	Inkatha Freedom Party
19 June 2024	15	Inkatha Freedom Party	Inkatha Freedom Party
2 Apr 2025	12	Inkatha Freedom Party	African National Congress

Following the by-election on 2 April 2025, the Inkatha Freedom Party (IFP) losts its majority, falling from 15 of the 29 seats to 14. It will likely work with the Democratic Alliance (DA) to retain its positions.

== November 2026 election ==
The following table shows the results of the 2026 election.

Party	Ward			List			Total seats
Party	Votes	%	Seats	Votes	%	Seats	Total seats
Inkatha Freedom Party	13,983	34.98	9	13,942	34.90	1	10
uMkhonto weSizwe Party	10,198	25.51	2	10,797	27.03	6	8
African National Congress	10,494	26.25	4	10,382	25.99	4	8
National Freedom Party	1,180	2.95	0	1,155	2.89	1	1
Democratic Alliance	912	2.28	0	1,056	2.64	1	1
Freedom Front Plus	901	2.25	0	919	2.30	1	1
Independent candidates	754	1.89	0				0
Economic Freedom Fighters	354	0.89	0	381	0.95	0	0
Pongola People's Party	301	0.75	0	385	0.96	0	0
Pongola Civic Forum	170	0.43	0	186	0.47	0	0
South African Communist Party	181	0.45	0	167	0.42	0	0
African Transformation Movement	101	0.25	0	119	0.30	0	0
Gap Fixers of South Africa	91	0.23	0	95	0.24	0	0
ActionSA	85	0.21	0	91	0.23	0	0
National Peoples Ambassadors	89	0.22	0	85	0.21	0	0
Afrika Mayibuye Movement	44	0.11	0	43	0.11	0	0
African Economic Freedom	39	0.10	0	46	0.12	0	0
Gods Justice and Development Party	43	0.11	0	41	0.10	0	0
National People's Front	35	0.09	0	27	0.07	0	0
Pan Africanist Congress of Azania	24	0.06	0	26	0.07	0	0
Total	39,979	100.00	15	39,943	100.00	14	29
Valid votes	39,979	99.08		39,943	99.13		
Invalid/blank votes	371	0.92		352	0.87		
Total votes	40,350	100.00		40,295	100.00		
Registered voters/turnout	73,357	55.00		73,357	54.93		
