= Derek Keys =

South African politician (1931–2018)

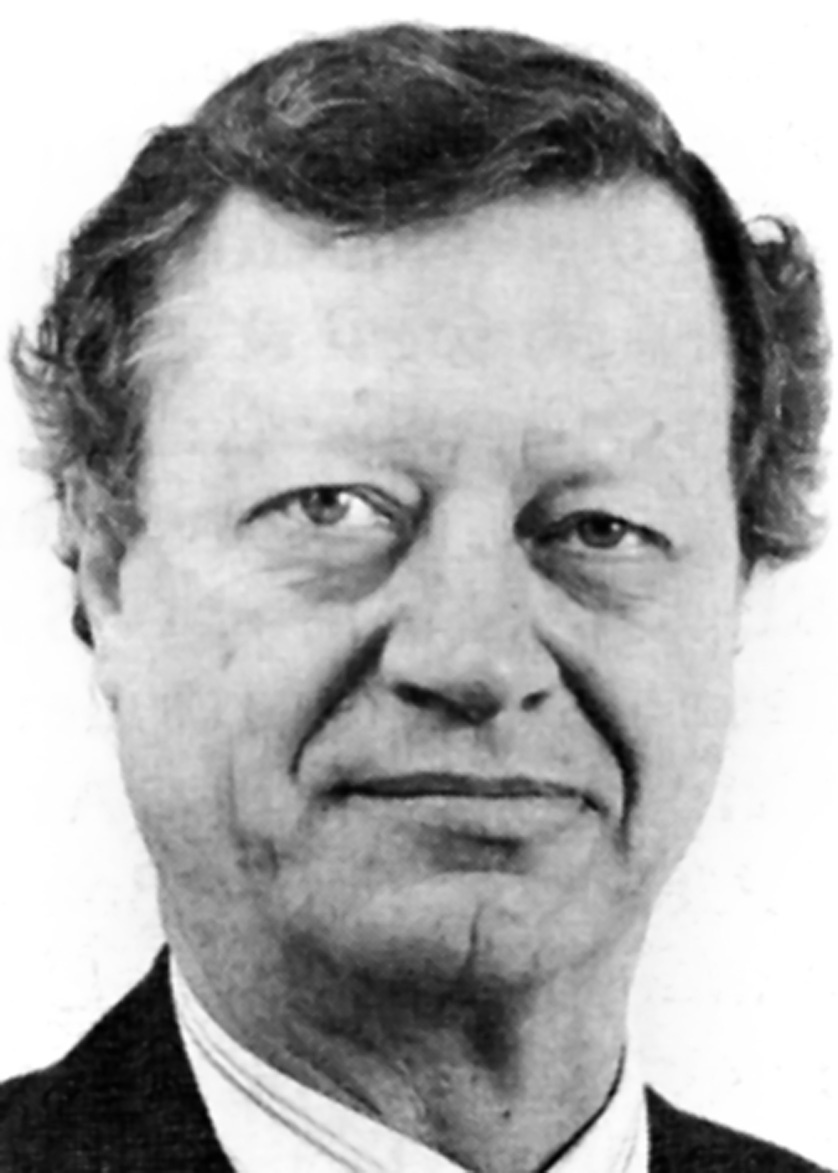
- Keys in 1994

Minister of Finance
- In office May 1992 – 19 September 1994
- President: F. W. de Klerk; Nelson Mandela
- Preceded by: Barend du Plessis
- Succeeded by: Chris Liebenberg

Personal details
- Born: Derek Lyle Keys; 30 August 1931 Johannesburg, South Africa
- Died: 29 April 2018 (aged 86)
- Education: University of the Witwatersrand

Derek Lyle Keys (30 August 1931 – 29 April 2018) was a South African politician who served as Minister of Finance from 1992 to September 1994, in the cabinets of F. W. de Klerk and Nelson Mandela.

== Early life ==
Born in Johannesburg, he attended the University of Witwatersrand where he graduated with a Bachelor of Commerce degree in 1950. By 1954, he qualified as a chartered accountant.

== Career ==
Keys joined the Industrial Development Corporation of South Africa in 1956. In the subsequent eight years he was involved in the development of many of the major South African industries. Until 1986 Keys played largely advisory roles for several international and local companies operating in South Africa as a management consultant. During these 21 years he joined the boards of, among others, Asea, Sandvik, and Sappi.

Prior to becoming a cabinet minister, he had been the executive chairman of Gencor from 1986 until 1991.

In December 1991 Keys was appointed Minister of Economic Co-ordination and of Trade and Industry. In May 1992, the portfolio of Minister of Finance was added to Keys' tasks. He had previously served on government bodies in an advisory capacity, including the commission for electricity, the Tax Advisory Committee and the State Presidents' Economic Advisory Council.

Keys resigned shortly on 6 July 1994, and was replaced by banker Chris Liebenberg on 19 September.
