= Miriam Altman =

South African businesswoman

- Education: McGill University (BA); University of Cambridge (MPhil); University of Manchester (PhD)
- Occupations: Economist, business executive, social activist, strategist
- Employer: University of Johannesburg

Miriam Altman is a South African economist, businesswoman, social activist, and strategist.

== Education ==
Altman read economics at McGill University where she got a Bachelor's degree in 1984. She then proceeded to earn a M.Phil in economics from Cambridge and a Ph.D. in economics from the University of Manchester in 1989 and 1996 respectively.

== Career ==
Altman served as an Executive Director at the Human Sciences Research Council where she worked on the "Employment Scenarios" project - its major project - from 2002 to 2012. The aim of the project was to build a scientific knowledge base and draw together stakeholders to engage on the ideas - the government, the private sector, labour and academia - to shape feasible, implementable solutions to reduce South Africa's high unemployment.

Altman was the Chief of Strategy and Regulatory Affairs at Telkom from June 2013 and April 2016.

Altman was a Commissioner on the National Planning Commission in the Office of the SA Presidency, the body tasked to guide long-term planning for South Africa. She was reappointed for a second term, serving from September 2015 to 2022.

Additionally, Altman is a Professor of 4IR Practice in the School of Economics at the University of Johannesburg and has been an adjunct professor at University of Cape Town, a visiting professor at Tsinghua University, and a non-resident Fellow at the Centre for Emerging Markets at the China Europe International Business School (CEIBS) in Shanghai.

== Personal life ==
Until 2021, Altman was in a romantic relationship with Leslie Maasdorp, Vice President and CFO at the New Development Bank.

== Selected publications ==
- Miriam Altman (1996). "Labour Regulation and Enterprise Strategies in the South African Clothing Industry". Regional Studies. 30 (4): 387–399. doi:10.1080/00343409612331349728.
- Miriam Altman; Zitha Mokomane; Gemma Wright (2014). "Social security for young people amidst high poverty and unemployment: Some policy options for South Africa". Development Southern Africa. 31 (2): 347–362. doi:10.1080/0376835X.2013.873346. S2CID 154006855.
