= National Development Plan 2030 =

South African government long-term plan

- National Development Plan

Development planning overview
- Formed: 19 February 2013; 12 years ago
- Jurisdiction: Government of South Africa
- Motto: Our future - make it work
- Minister responsible: Mondli Gungubele
- Parent department: National Planning Commission of South Africa
- Key document: National Development Plan 2030
- Website: www.gov.za/issues/national-development-plan-2030; www.nationalplanningcommission.org.za/National_Development_Plan

The National Development Plan 2030 is an important policy document of the South African government drafted in August 2012 by the National Planning Commission, a special ministerial body first constituted in 2009 by President Jacob Zuma. The Plan contains a series of proposals to eliminate poverty and reduce inequality by 2030.
