= Sibonelo Nomvalo =

South African politician

Member of the National Assembly of South Africa
- Incumbent
- Assumed office 2024

Personal details
- Party: uMkhonto weSizwe Party

Sibonelo Nomvalo is a South African politician who was most recently a Member of Parliament (MP) for the uMkhonto weSizwe Party (MK). He also served as the Secretary-General of the party until he was relieved of his duties on 22 October 2026.

== MK Secretary General ==
Nomvalo was appointed MK Secretary General in March 2026, becoming the eighth person to hold the role since the party's formation in December 2023.

On 22 October 2026, he was relieved of his duties via a media statement released by the Party.

== See also ==
- List of National Assembly members of the 28th Parliament of South Africa
