= Bruce Hemphill =

South African businessman (born 1963)

- Born: Jonathan Bruce Hemphill; June 1963 (age 62)
- Occupation: Businessman
- Title: CEO of Old Mutual plc
- Term: 2015–present
- Predecessor: Julian Roberts
- Successor: Incumbent

Jonathan Bruce Hemphill (born June 1963) is a South African businessman. He is the chief executive of Old Mutual, an international long-term savings group and FTSE 100 company, since 1 November 2015, succeeding Julian Roberts.

Jonathan Bruce Hemphill was born in June 1963.

Hemphill was CEO of Liberty Holdings Limited, and then head of wealth, insurance and nonbank financial services at Standard Bank Group.
