= Radical Economic Transformation =

South African political and economic slogan

Radical Economic Transformation (commonly abbreviated as RET) was a socio-political and economic policy framework associated with a faction within the African National Congress (ANC), South Africa's ruling party. It broadly advocated for the accelerated and fundamental restructuring of the South African economy to address racially historic injustices and economic disparities created by apartheid.

RET is closely associated with former President Jacob Zuma, who popularised the rhetoric during his presidency, particularly his second term. It has been embraced by a faction within the ANC that includes prominent figures such as Ace Magashule, Supra Mahumapelo and Carl Niehaus.

The RET faction has frequently opposed the leadership of President Cyril Ramaphosa, accusing him of representing "White monopoly capital" and deviating from the ANC's founding principles of economic justice as outlined in the Freedom Charter and subsequent conference resolutions.

== Overview and criticism ==
Radical Economic Transformation calls for the redistribution of wealth and control of the economy to the historically disadvantaged Black majority. It proposes a range of policies aimed at redressing economic inequality, including land reform, the nationalisation of key sectors such as the South African Reserve Bank and mines, and the prioritisation of Black-owned enterprises in government procurement.

The RET agenda is rooted in the Freedom Charter, adopted by the ANC in 1955, which stated that "the people shall share in the country's wealth" and that "the land shall be shared among those who work it".

=== Criticism and controversy ===
Critics argue that Radical Economic Transformation has been used as a political shield to justify corruption and state capture under the Zuma administration, specifically involving the infamous Gupta family. The Zondo Commission into State Capture heard extensive testimony implicating RET-aligned figures in widespread looting of state institutions.

Other critics claim the RET agenda lacks a coherent economic strategy and poses a threat to investor confidence, job creation, and economic stability. They argued that RET was not an adopted policy of the ANC.

Supporters of RET argue that the post-apartheid economic framework has largely preserved historic inequalities, and that calls for moderation and neoliberal policy are an impediment to true transformation.

RET remains a central theme in intra-ANC factional battles and is frequently invoked by youth wings, veterans' groups, and politicians sympathetic to Zuma. Outside the ANC, the Economic Freedom Fighters (EFF) advocate a parallel vision of radical economic restructuring.

Proponents reject the notion that RET is synonymous with corruption, asserting instead that corruption is a broader governance issue that cannot be used to discredit the underlying principles of economic justice. They argue that RET was an ANC policy and that the narrative equating RET with looting has been pushed by political opponents and the mainstream media to delegitimize a movement aimed at dismantling entrenched economic privilege.

In this view, RET is not an ad hoc slogan but a long-overdue commitment to empowering the Black majority through state-led industrialization, land redistribution, and the localization of economic value chains. Advocates claim that without such measures, South Africa risks perpetuating an economic order that remains fundamentally colonial in structure.

== The document ==
In March 2021, Carl Niehaus, working in the office of ANC secretary-general Ace Magashule, published a document titled Radical Economic Transformation: A Basic Document, commonly referred to as the "RET Manifesto". It first circulated internally among ANC aligned provincial and youth structures before its public release on 15 March 2021.

The eight-page document aligns itself with the Freedom Charter, arguing for the implementation of its principles such as wealth redistribution, land restitution and economic sovereignty for the Black South African majority. Though criticised as diverting from ANC policies and attempts to form a splinter party from ANC offices, it detailed demographic and socio-economic data and proposed:

- Land expropriation without compensation
- Nationalisation of key sectors, including the South African Reserve Bank, mining and telecommunications
- Redistribution of economic resources to address racial disparities
- Decolonisation of economic structures to dismantle entrenched systems of racial economic dominance

The document was widely interpreted as the ideological foundation for the RET faction, especially in the context of internal ANC leadership contests and the pushback against President Cyril Ramaphosa's administration. It provided a rallying template for sympathisers aligned with Jacob Zuma.

== See also ==
- Practical Radical Economic Transformation of South Africa
