= Executive Council of the Eastern Cape =

Provincial government in South Africa

The Executive Council of the Eastern Cape is the cabinet of the executive branch of the provincial government in the South African province of the Eastern Cape. The Members of the Executive Council (MECs) are appointed from among the members of the Eastern Cape Provincial Legislature by the Premier of the Eastern Cape, an office held since the 2019 general election by Oscar Mabuyane of the African National Congress (ANC).

== Kiviet premiership: 2009–2014 ==
Following his election as Premier in the 2009 general election, Noxolo Kiviet announced his Executive Council in May 2009. On 27 November 2010, he announced a major cabinet reshuffle, which included restructuring more than half of the ten portfolios in the Executive Council.

Eastern Cape Executive Council 2009–2014
Post	Member	Term	
Premier of the Eastern Cape	Noxolo Kiviet	2009	2014
MEC for Provincial Planning and Finance	Phumulo Masualle	2010	2014
MEC for Economic Development, Environmental Affairs and Tourism	Mcebisi Jonas	2010	2014
MEC for Finance, Economic Development and Environmental Affairs	Mcebisi Jonas	2009	2010
MEC for Health	Sicelo Gqobana	2010	2014
MEC for Health	Phumulo Masualle	2009	2010
MEC for Education and Training	Mandla Makupula	2010	2014
MEC for Education	Mahlubandile Qwase	2009	2010
MEC for Public Works, Roads and Transport	Thandiswa Marawu	2010	2014
MEC for Roads and Public Works	Pemmy Majodina	2009	2010
MEC for Human Settlements, Safety and Liaison	Helen Sauls-August	2010	2014
MEC for Housing	Nombulelo Mabandla	2009	2010
MEC for Transport and Safety	Ghishma Barry	2009	2010
MEC for Rural Development and Agrarian Reform	Zoleka Capa	2010	2014
MEC for Agriculture and Rural Development	Mbulelo Sogoni	2009	2010
MEC for Local Government and Traditional Affairs	Mlibo Qoboshiyane	2010	2014
MEC for Local Government and Traditional Affairs	Sicelo Gqobana	2009	2010
MEC for Social Development, Women, Youth and People with Disabilities	Pemmy Majodina	2010	2014
MEC for Social Development	Nonkosi Mvana	2009	2010
MEC for Sports, Recreation, Arts and Culture	Xoliswa Tom	2009	2014

== Masualle premiership: 2014–2019 ==
Phumulo Masualle was elected Premier in the 2014 general election and he announced his new Executive Council on 23 May 2014. Near the end of his term, on 10 May 2018, Masualle announced a major reshuffle, effective from the day before; four MECs – Mlibo Qoboshiyane, Thandiswa Marawu, Sakhumzi Somyo and Nancy Sihlwayi – were sacked, and others changed portfolios. In a minor reshuffle in November that year, Babalo Madikizela was appointed to the Executive Council to take over the portfolio of Human Settlements MEC Mlungisi Mvoko, who in turn was appointed to fill the vacancy left by the death of Education MEC Mandla Makupula in October.

Eastern Cape Executive Council 2014–2019
Post	Member	Term	
Premier of the Eastern Cape	Phumulo Masualle	2014	2019
MEC for Finance, Economic Development, Environmental Affairs and Tourism	Oscar Mabuyane	2018	2019
MEC for Finance, Economic Development, Environmental Affairs and Tourism	Sakhumzi Somyo	2014	2018
MEC for Health	Helen Sauls-August	2018	2019
MEC for Health	Pumza Dyantyi	2014	2018
MEC for Education	Mlungisi Mvoko	2018	2019
MEC for Education	Mandla Makupula	2014	2018
MEC for Transport, Roads and Public Works	Pemmy Majodina	2018	2019
MEC for Transport, Roads and Public Works	Thandiswa Marawu	2014	2018
MEC for Human Settlements	Babalo Madikizela	2018	2019
MEC for Human Settlements	Mlungisi Mvoko	2018	2018
MEC for Human Settlements	Helen Sauls-August	2014	2018
MEC for Rural Development and Agrarian Reform	Xolile Nqatha	2018	2019
MEC for Rural Development and Agrarian Reform	Mlibo Qoboshiyane	2014	2018
MEC for Community Safety and Liaison	Weziwe Tikana	2014	2019
MEC for Cooperative Governance and Traditional Affairs	Fikile Xasa	2014	2019
MEC for Social Development	Pumza Dyantyi	2018	2019
MEC for Social Development	Nancy Sihlwayi	2014	2018
MEC for Sports, Recreation, Arts and Culture	Bulelwa Tunyiswa	2018	2019
MEC for Sports, Recreation, Arts and Culture	Pemmy Majodina	2014	2018

== Mabuyane premiership: 2019–present ==
=== First term: 2019–2024 ===
On 28 May 2019, following the 2019 general election, newly elected Premier Oscar Mabuyane announced his new Executive Council; he retained four MECs from the previous administration, although three of those four had not joined until 2018. On 18 February 2021, Mabuyane announced that he had fired Sindiswa Gomba as Health MEC amid allegations that she had been involved in procurement irregularities. Gomba's replacement was appointed in a cabinet reshuffle affecting four portfolios, announced by Mabuyane in early March.

In May 2022, shortly after losing his bid to oust Mabuyane as ANC Provincial Chairperson at a party conference, Public Works MEC Babalo Madikizela announced his intention to resign from government. He officially resigned in late July. His departure occasioned a cabinet reshuffle, announced on 16 August, in which Mabuyane appointed three new MECs and moved three others to different portfolios. The two MECs fired in the reshuffle – Fezeka Nkomonye and Weziwe Tikana-Gxothiwe – were viewed as having supported Madikizela's campaign at the ANC conference.

Eastern Cape Executive Council 2019–2024
Post	Member	Term	
Premier of the Eastern Cape	Oscar Mabuyane	2019	2024
MEC for Finance, Economic Development and Environmental Affairs	Mlungisi Mvoko	2019	2024
MEC for Health	Nomakhosazana Meth	2021	2024
MEC for Health	Sindiswa Gomba	2019	2021
MEC for Education	Fundile Gade	2019	2024
MEC for Public Works and Infrastructure	Ntombovuyo Nkopane	2022	2024
MEC for Public Works and Infrastructure	Babalo Madikizela	2019	2022
MEC for Human Settlements	Siphokazi Mani-Lusithi	2022	2024
MEC for Human Settlements	Nonceba Kontsiwe	2021	2022
MEC for Human Settlements	Nonqkubela Pieters	2019	2021
MEC for Rural Development and Agrarian Reform	Nonqkubela Pieters	2021	2024
MEC for Rural Development and Agrarian Reform	Nomakhosazana Meth	2019	2021
MEC for Transport and Community Safety	Xolile Nqatha	2022	2024
MEC for Transport and Community Safety	Weziwe Tikana-Gxothiwe	2019	2022
MEC for Cooperative Governance and Traditional Affairs	Zolile Williams	2022	2024
MEC for Cooperative Governance and Traditional Affairs	Xolile Nqatha	2019	2022
MEC for Social Development	Bukiwe Fanta	2022	2024
MEC for Social Development	Siphokazi Mani-Lusithi	2019	2022
MEC for Sports, Recreation, Arts and Culture	Nonceba Kontsiwe	2022	Incumbent
MEC for Sports, Recreation, Arts and Culture	Fezeka Nkomonye-Bayeni	2019	2022

=== Second term: 2024–present ===
Following the ANC's victory in the Eastern Cape in the 2024 provincial election, premier Oscar Mabuyane was re-elected during the first sitting of the legislature on 14 June 2024. He announced his new executive council a week later which saw five Members of the Executive Council retained in their positions from the previous administration.

Eastern Cape Executive Council 2024–present
Post	Member	Term	
Premier of the Eastern Cape	Oscar Mabuyane	2024	Incumbent
MEC for Finance	Mlungisi Mvoko	2024	Incumbent
MEC for Education	Fundile Gade	2024	Incumbent
MEC for Health	Ntandokazi Capa	2024	Incumbent
MEC for Cooperative Governance and Traditional Affairs	Zolile Williams	2024	Incumbent
MEC for Economic Development, Environmental Affairs, and Tourism	Nonkqubela Pieters	2024	Incumbent
MEC for Sport, Recreation, Arts and Culture	Sibulele Ngongo	2024	Incumbent
MEC for Social Development	Bukiwe Fanta	2024	Incumbent
MEC for Public Works and Human Settlements	Siphokazi Mani-Lusithi	2024	Incumbent
MEC for Transport and Community Safety	Xolile Nqatha	2024	Incumbent
MEC for Agriculture	Nonceba Kontsiwe	2024	Incumbent

== See also ==
- Template:Eastern Cape Executive Council
- Government of South Africa
- Constitution of South Africa
- Cape province
