= Politics of the Eastern Cape =

Like the other eight provinces in South Africa, Eastern Cape is governed by a parliamentary system, with the premier of the province selected from the leadership of the largest party or coalition in the provincial legislature. The premier then selects the members of his Executive Council (cabinet) from among his fellow MPLs; they are assigned to the different departments in the government, even though the departments' day-to-day business is run by the Heads of the Department (HOD), who are also appointed by the premier.

== Executive Council ==
Portfolio	MEC
Premier	Oscar Mabuyane
Finance	Mlungisi Mvoko
Education	Fundile Gade
Health	Ntandokazi Capa
Cooperative Governance and Traditional Affairs	Zolile Williams
Economic Development, Environmental Affairs, and Tourism	Nonkqubela Pieters
Sport, Recreation, Arts and Culture	Sibulele Ngongo
Social Development	Bukiwe Fanta
Public Works and Human Settlements	Siphokazi Mani-Lusithi
Transport and Community Safety	Xolile Nqatha
Agriculture	Nonceba Kontsiwe
