= Mlibo Qoboshiyane =

South African politician (born 1974)

Mlibo Qoboshiyane MPL

Deputy Speaker of the Eastern Cape Provincial Legislature
- Incumbent
- Assumed office 17 May 2018
- Speaker: Noxolo Kiviet; Helen Sauls-August

Member of the Eastern Cape Executive Council for Rural Development and Agrarian Reform
- In office 23 May 2014 – 9 May 2018
- Premier: Phumulo Masualle
- Preceded by: Zoleka Capa
- Succeeded by: Xolile Nqatha

Member of the Eastern Cape Executive Council for Local Government and Traditional Affairs
- In office 27 November 2010 – 23 May 2014
- Premier: Noxolo Kiviet
- Preceded by: Sicelo Gqobana
- Succeeded by: Fikile Xasa (for Cooperative Governance and Traditional Affairs)

Personal details
- Born: 16 June 1974 (age 52)
- Citizenship: South Africa
- Party: African National Congress

Mlibo Qoboshiyane (born 16 June 1974) is a South African politician who has been serving as Deputy Speaker of the Eastern Cape Provincial Legislature since 17 May 2018. Before that, he was the Eastern Cape's Member of the Executive Council for Rural Development and Agrarian Reform from 2014 to 2018 under Premier Phumulo Masualle.

== Political career ==
In a cabinet reshuffle announced on 27 November 2010, Noxolo Kiviet, then the Premier of the Eastern Cape, appointed Qoboshiyane to the Eastern Cape Executive Council as Member of the Executive Council (MEC) for Local Government and Traditional Affairs. Qoboshiyane held that office until the 2014 general election, when he was re-elected to his seat in the Eastern Cape Provincial Legislature, ranked second on the provincial party list of the African National Congress (ANC). After the election, newly elected Premier Phumulo Masualle appointed him MEC for Rural Development and Agrarian Reform.

Qoboshiyane remained in that portfolio until 9 May 2018, when Masualle effected a major cabinet reshuffle in which Qoboshiyane was fired and replaced by Xolile Nqatha. City Press reported that the provincial leadership of the ANC, led by Oscar Mabuyane, had forced Masualle to make the changes. Mabuyane had succeeded Masualle as ANC Provincial Chairperson at a hotly contested party elective conference in October 2017, at which Qoboshiyane had supported Masualle over Mabuyane.

After he left the Executive Council, Qoboshiyane retained his legislative seat. On 17 May 2018, he was elected unopposed as the Deputy Speaker of the Eastern Cape Provincial Legislature; he succeeded Bulelwa Tunyiswa, who had been appointed to the Executive Council in the same reshuffle in which Qoboshiyane was fired. In the 2019 general election, Qoboshiyane was re-elected to the legislature, ranked seventh on the ANC's party list, and was re-elected as Deputy Speaker.

Ahead of the ANC's next party elective conference in 2022, Qoboshiyane campaigned to replace Mabuyane as ANC Provincial Chairperson. Mabuyane and Babalo Madikizela were viewed as the frontrunners in the election, but Qoboshiyane presented himself as a compromise candidate leading a slate which also included MECs Fundile Gade and Weziwe Tikana-Gxothiwe. However, when the conference opened in May 2022, Qoboshiyane withdrew his name from contention and joined Madikizela's slate. Mabuyane ultimately won re-election and, at the same conference, Qoboshiyane failed to gain election to the ANC's Provincial Executive Committee.

== Personal life ==
Qoboshiyane has a twin sister, Mlibokazi; their birthday is 16 June. He is married to Vatiswa Qoboshiyane.
