= Mandla Makupula =

South African politician (1961–2018)

Member of the Eastern Cape Executive Council for Education
- In office 27 November 2010 – 8 October 2018
- Premier: Noxolo Kiviet; Phumulo Masualle
- Preceded by: Mahlubandile Qwase
- Succeeded by: Mlungisi Mvoko

Member of the Eastern Cape Provincial Legislature
- In office 1999 – 8 October 2018

Personal details
- Born: 9 October 1961 Duncan Village, Cape Province; South Africa
- Died: 8 October 2018 (aged 56) East London, Eastern Cape
- Party: African National Congress
- Other political affiliations: South African Communist Party
- Education: University of Transkei; University of Fort Hare

Mandla Makupula (9 October 1961 – 8 October 2018) was a South African politician who served as the Eastern Cape's Member of the Executive Council (MEC) from November 2010 until his death in October 2018. He had represented the African National Congress (ANC) in the Eastern Cape Provincial Legislature since 1999.

A teacher by training, Makupula rose to political prominence through the South African Democratic Teachers Union of the former Transkei. He was also a former Provincial Secretary of the South African Communist Party (SACP) and served on the Central Committee of the SACP from 2012 until his death.

== Early life and career ==
Makupula was born on 9 October 1961 in Duncan Village in the former Cape Province, though his family later moved to Mdantsane. He had six sisters. He qualified as a teacher at the University of Transkei and then pursued undergraduate studies in science and mathematics. He began his undergraduate degree at the University of Fort Hare in 1982, but he was expelled in August of that year for his political activity – his arrival coincided with a fierce battle between Fort Hare students and the Ciskei government – and returned to the University of Transkei. At Transkei, Makupula was active in the Azanian Students' Organisation, the South African National Students Congress, and the student representative council. He also played rugby.

In the early 1990s, Makupula began teaching at a secondary school in Mthatha, where he was a zonal chairperson for the South African Democratic Teachers Union. Simultaneously, he rose through the ranks of the ANC Youth League, the mainstream ANC, and the South African Communist Party (SACP) in the Transkei region. He was an ardent Marxist and ultimately was elected Provincial Secretary of the SACP in the Eastern Cape.

== Career in government ==
In 1999, Makupula was elected to represent the ANC in the Eastern Cape Provincial Legislature. He served as an ordinary Member of the Provincial Legislature for two legislative terms, chairing three different portfolio committees, and was elected to his third term in the 2009 general election, ranked 14th on the ANC's provincial party list.

The year after the election, on 27 November 2010, Eastern Cape Premier Noxolo Kiviet announced that he would join the Eastern Cape Executive Council as MEC for Education and Training. Pursuant to the 2014 general election, he was re-elected to the legislature, ranked seventh on the party list, and was retained in the Education portfolio by Kiviet's successor, Phumulo Masualle. He ultimately remained in his office from 2010 until his death in 2018, making him the province's longest-serving Education MEC. Simultaneously, he served two terms as a member of the Central Committee of the SACP from 2012 until his death.

== Personal life and death ==
In September 2018, Makupula fell ill during departmental Heritage Day celebrations in Aliwal North. He was hospitalised in East London, where he died early on 8 October 2018, the day before his 57th birthday. In September 2019, following a memorial lecture by former national minister Senzeni Zokwana, the Eastern Cape provincial government renamed the East London Education Leadership Institute in his honour.

In 2010, Makupula married Gugulethu Mdilane, with whom he had six children.
