= Pumza Dyantyi =

South African politician and activist (1948–2020)

Member of the National Assembly of South Africa
- In office 22 May 2019 – 7 December 2020
- Succeeded by: Dingaan Myolwa
- Constituency: Eastern Cape

Eastern Cape MEC for Social Development
- In office 9 May 2018 – 7 May 2019
- Premier: Phumulo Masualle
- Preceded by: Nancy Sihlwayi
- Succeeded by: Siphokazi Mani-Lusithi

Eastern Cape MEC for Health
- In office 23 May 2014 – 9 May 2018
- Premier: Phumulo Masualle
- Preceded by: Sicelo Gqobana
- Succeeded by: Helen Sauls-August

Member of the Eastern Cape Provincial Legislature
- In office 21 May 2014 – 7 May 2019

Personal details
- Born: 5 September 1948 Engcobo, Cape Province, South Africa
- Died: 7 December 2020 (aged 72)
- Party: African National Congress

Pumza Patricia Dyantyi (5 September 1948 – 7 December 2020) was a South African politician and anti-apartheid activist. A member of the African National Congress, Dyantyi was elected to the Eastern Cape Provincial Legislature in 2014. She served as the Member of the Executive Council (MEC) for Health from 2014 to 2018, when she was appointed MEC for Social Development. From 2019 Dyantyi was a member of the South African National Assembly.

== Early life and education ==
Pumza Patricia Dyantyi was born on 5 September 1948 in Engcobo in South Africa's former Cape Province. In 1965, she obtained a junior certificate. She received a senior certificate in 1968. Dyantyi earned a diploma in general nursing at the Chris Hani Baragwanath Hospital in Johannesburg in 1971. In 1972 she received a diploma in midwifery at the McCord Hospital in Durban. While in exile in Cuba, Dyantyi obtained a degree in medicine in 1987. In 2000 she received a diploma in management studies. Dyantyi held a masters in business administration from Buckinghamshire New University.

== Career ==
=== Anti-apartheid activities ===
Dyantyi's career in politics started in 1968 when she went to the Chris Hani Baragwanath Hospital to train as a nurse. She was allocated to a ward where Nomazotsho Gqabi was the sister in charge. She became friends with Gqabi, and she introduced Dyantyi to her husband's associates. Dyantyi met a lot of African National Congress activists. She then went to Durban to study midwifery. She was in the same class as Nosidima Pityana, a youth organiser, and they joined the South African Students' Organisation together.

Dyanti was first arrested in 1970. In the same trial, Amos Masondo was acquitted. The ANC then told her to leave the country after her following arrest. Dyantyi formally went into exile in 1978 and did her military training in Benguela and Quibashe in Angola. She was also stationed in Cuba and attended a medical school there. Dyantyi then went to Zimbabwe and headed the Health Desk of the ANC.

=== Return to South Africa ===
She returned to South Africa in 1991 and became a member of the ANC branch in Dutywa. She went on to serve as the mayor of the Mbhashe Local Municipality. From 2000 to 2010 she was a member of the council of the Walter Sisulu University. Dyantyi served on the board of directors of Mida Private School from 2007 to 2014 and as the chair of the board of directors at the Ntinga Development Agency from 2008 to 2014. Between 2011 and 2014, she was a member of the Board of Directors of the GEMS Medical Scheme, the Board of Directors of Armscor, and the Council of the Nelson Mandela Museum.

Dyantyi was also a member of the following ANC structures: the provincial executive committee, the Veterans' League, the Women's League, the Eastern Cape health sub-committee, and the Umkhonto we Sizwe Military Veterans Association.

=== Eastern Cape Provincial Government ===
In 2014, she stood for election to the Eastern Cape Provincial Legislature as 16th on the ANC's list. At the election, she won a seat in the provincial legislature. Dyantyi was then made Member of the Executive Council (MEC) for Health by premier Phumulo Masualle. In September 2016, she welcomed doctors from Cuba. She said that the department did not have enough doctors and that the initiative was part of the provincial government's plan to provide experience. An agreement between four provincial universities and the health department to combine resources and organise the training of health workers was signed at Nelson Mandela University in September 2017.

On 9 May 2018, Dyantyi was appointed as MEC for Social Development, replacing Nancy Sihlwayi. She announced in January 2019 that the department was struggling to afford to take in new frail care patients and that the department was only referring "severely frail patients" to the department of health.

=== Parliamentary career ===
In 2019, she stood for election to the National Assembly as the first candidate on the ANC's provincial-to-national list. At the election, she won a seat in the assembly. She became a member of the Portfolio Committee on Health upon election. In August 2019 Dyantyi said that the National Health Insurance should be like a McDonald's, as in you know what you would get at what price, and the prices are the same everywhere.

== Death ==
Dyantyi died on 7 December 2020 from COVID-19. Parliament's presiding officers sent their condolences.

== See also ==
- List of members of the National Assembly of South Africa who died in office
