= Sindiswa Gomba =

South African politician (born 1958)

Sindiswa Gomba MPL

Eastern Cape MEC for Health
- In office 29 May 2019 – 18 February 2021
- Premier: Oscar Mabuyane
- Preceded by: Helen Sauls-August
- Succeeded by: Xolile Nqatha (acting); Nomakhosazana Meth

Member of the Eastern Cape Provincial Legislature
- Incumbent
- Assumed office 19 March 2019

Personal details
- Born: 21 May 1958 (age 67)
- Party: African National Congress
- Profession: Politician

Sindiswa Griselda Gomba (born 21 May 1958) is a South African politician who was the Eastern Cape MEC for Health from 2019 to 2021. She became a Member of the Eastern Cape Provincial Legislature in March 2019. Gomba is a member of the African National Congress (ANC) and previously served as a municipal councillor of the Buffalo City Metropolitan Municipality.

== Early political career ==
Gomba joined the ANC and started her political career as a municipal councillor of the Buffalo City Metropolitan Municipality. During her tenure on the council, she was one of the longest-serving councillors. She and many other councillors were charged in relation to the scandal around Nelson Mandela's funeral.

== Eastern Cape provincial government ==
On 19 March 2019, she was sworn in as a Member of the Eastern Cape Provincial Legislature, succeeding Thandiswa Marawu. She was elected to her first full term in May 2019. She was sworn in on 22 May. Premier Oscar Mabuyane appointed her to his Executive Council as the MEC for Health. She assumed the office on 29 May.

On 12 February 2021, Gomba appeared at the East London Magistrate's Court on charges of corruption, money laundering, fraud, and violation of the Municipal Finance Act in relation to the alleged siphoning of a portion of the R10 million that was meant for Mandela's funeral, through flouting tender processes. She is one of 14 co-accused. On 18 February, premier Mabuyane dismissed her as the MEC for Health. She will remain as an ordinary member of the Eastern Cape provincial legislature.

=== Coronavirus pandemic ===
In April 2020, national health minister Zweli Mkhize expressed his frustration with Gomba's handling of the COVID-19 pandemic in Nelson Mandela Bay. The regional African National Congress Youth League called for her removal, but premier Mabuyane defended her.

While in a Zoom meeting with minister Mkhize and her provincial counterparts on 28 April 2020, Gomba said: "andidikwe" (meaning "I am fed up"). Her comment generated controversy, and she subsequently apologised, saying that she was misunderstood.

On 12 June 2020, the Eastern Cape Health Department launched a project, in which they bought scooters to address the challenge of people being rushed to hospitals in wheelbarrows in rural areas in the province. The project was seen as controversial and a failure.

On 13 December 2020, Gomba tested positive for the coronavirus, but she since recovered.

Political offices
| Preceded by Helen Sauls-August | Eastern Cape MEC for Health; 2019–2021 | Succeeded by Xolile Nqatha (acting); Nomakhosazana Meth |
