= Weziwe Tikana-Gxotiwe =

South African politician, educator and trade unionist

Weziwe Tikana-Gxotiwe MP

Member of the National Assembly of South Africa
- Incumbent
- Assumed office 14 June 2024

Eastern Cape MEC for Transport, Safety and Liaison
- In office 23 May 2014 – 16 August 2022
- Premier: Phumulo Masualle; Oscar Mabuyane
- Preceded by: Thandiswa Marawu
- Succeeded by: Xolile Nqatha

Member of the Eastern Cape Provincial Legislature
- Incumbent
- Assumed office 21 May 2014

Personal details
- Born: Weziwe Tikana; 3 November 1967 (age 58)
- Party: African National Congress
- Children: 3
- Education: Sewushe Commercial College
- Alma mater: Arthur Tsengiwe College of Education; Belgravia Institute; University of Pretoria; Global Business Solution
- Profession: Politician, educator

Weziwe Tikana-Gxotiwe (born 3 November 1967) is a South African politician, educator and trade unionist who has been a Member of the National Assembly of South Africa since 2024, representing the African National Congress. Prior to her election to parliament, she served in the Eastern Cape Provincial Legislature

== Early life and education ==
Tikana-Gxotiwe was born in Cala in the former Cape Province (now the Eastern Cape). She matriculated from Sewushe Commercial College. She completed a teachers' course at Arthur Tsengiwe College of Education. Tikana-Gxotiwe holds a primary teachers' diploma from Belgravia Institute and a diploma in local government Management from the University of Pretoria. Tikana-Gxotiwe earned a diploma in labour law from Global Business Solution.

== Career ==
Tikana-Gxotiwe worked as an educator and training officer at the Department of Education and the Xhalanga Entrepreneurial Development Centre. She was also an adult basic education supervisor at the Cala Guidance Centre. She was also a senior administration officer at the Emalahleni Local Municipality and was employed as a director of municipal public participation at the Local Government and Traditional Affairs Department. Tikana-Gxotiwe also served on the Vukani Community Radio Station board.

== Politics ==
Tikana-Gxotiwe is a member of the African National Congress and the party's women's league and serves on both organisations' provincial executive committees. Tikana-Gxotiwe also served on the structures of the South African Democratic Teachers Union and the Xhalanga Youth Congress.

Tikana-Gxotiwe served on the regional executive committee of the ANC's women's league in the former Engcobo Region and was a member of the inter-regional structure of the former Ngcobo, Queenstown and mid-Karoo region. She also served as treasurer of the ANC's Chris Hani region.

Tikana-Gxotiwe is a former mayor of Sakhisizwe Local Municipality in the Chris Hani District Municipality and former South African Democratic Teachers Union deputy chair. She was a member of the SALGA management committee and served as the chairperson of the Governance Sub-Committee of the organisation.

=== Provincial government ===
In 2014 Tikana-Gxotiwe was elected as a member of the Eastern Cape Provincial Legislature. She was then appointed as the Member of the Executive Council (MEC) for Transport, Safety and Liaison by premier Phumulo Masualle. Tikana-Gxotiwe was re-elected to another term in the legislature in 2019. She remained in her position as MEC for Transport, Safety and Liaison following Oscar Mabuyane's election as premier, meaning that she was the only member of Masualle's executive to be appointed to Mabuyane's executive.

In June 2020, Tikana-Gxotiwe lost a court case in which she wanted the United Democratic Movement (UDM) leader, Bantu Holomisa to retract a tweet raising concerns over a guest house, which is in her daughter's name, that the provincial government decided to use a COVID-19 isolation facility. Judge Gerald Bloem found it likely that Tikana-Gxotiwe was the owner or held a benefit in the Mioca Lodge in Cala.

In March 2021, acting Public Protector Kholeka Gcaleka found that there was no improper conduct by Tikana-Gxotiwe in relation to the procurement of her daughter's lodge as a COVID-19 quarantine site.

On 16 August 2022, Mabuyane reshuffled his executive council and removed Tikana-Gxotiwe as the MEC for Transport, Safety and Liaison due to her support for Babalo Madikizela, his contender for provincial chairperson at the ANC's provincial elective conference in May 2022.

== National parliament ==
Tikana-Gxotiwe was ranked number 71 on the ANC's national candidate list for the 2024 general election. At the election, she won a seat in the National Assembly of South Africa. She was sworn in as a Member of Parliament.
