= Xoliswa Tom =

South African politician

Member of the National Assembly
- In office 21 May 2014 – 7 May 2019

Member of the Eastern Cape Executive Council for Sport, Recreation, Arts and Culture
- In office May 2009 – 6 May 2014
- Premier: Noxolo Kiviet
- Succeeded by: Pemmy Majodina

Personal details
- Citizenship: South Africa
- Party: African National Congress

Xoliswa Sandra Tom is a South African politician who represented the African National Congress (ANC) in the National Assembly from 2014 to 2019. During that time she served as Chairperson of the Portfolio Committee on Arts and Culture. Before her election to the national legislature, Tom represented the ANC in the Eastern Cape Provincial Legislature, including as the Eastern Cape's Member of the Executive Council (MEC) for Sport, Recreation, Arts and Culture under Premier Noxolo Kiviet from 2009 to 2014.

== Legislative career ==
Tom entered the Eastern Cape Provincial Legislature in March 2003, filling a casual vacancy that had arisen in the ANC caucus after Ncumisa Kondlo resigned to join the National Council of Provinces.

In the 2009 general election, Tom was ranked 13th on the ANC's provincial party list, and, after the election, Premier Noxolo Kiviet announced that Tom would serve in her Executive Council as MEC for Sport, Recreation, Arts and Culture. Tom remained in that portfolio for the entirety of the legislative term.

In the 2014 general election, she did not seek re-election to the provincial legislature but instead was elected to the National Assembly, the lower house of the South African Parliament; she was ranked 82nd on the ANC's national party list. Shortly after the election, the ANC, the majority party in Parliament, announced that it intended to nominate Tom to serve as Chairperson of the Portfolio Committee on Arts and Culture. She was elected and held the chairmanship throughout the fifth Parliament. After a full legislative term in her seat, Tom did not stand for re-election in 2019.
