= Bulelwa Tunyiswa =

South African politician

Member of the Eastern Cape Executive Council for Sport, Recreation, Arts and Culture
- In office 9 May 2018 – 7 May 2019
- Premier: Phumulo Masualle
- Preceded by: Pemmy Majodina
- Succeeded by: Fezeka Nkomonye-Bayeni

Personal details
- Born: 1962 (age 63–64) Middledrift, Cape Province; South Africa
- Party: African National Congress
- Other political affiliations: South African Communist Party
- Education: University of the Western Cape; University of Fort Hare

Bulelwa Tunyiswa is a South African politician who served as the Eastern Cape's Member of the Executive Council (MEC) for Sports, Recreation, Arts and Culture from May 2018 to May 2019. Before that, she was the Deputy Speaker of the Eastern Cape Provincial Legislature from 2010 to 2018. She lost her position on the Executive Council after the 2019 general election, when she failed to gain re-election to the provincial legislature. A member of the African National Congress (ANC), Tunyiswa has also been a member of the Central Committee of the South African Communist Party (SACP) since 2012.

== Early life and career ==
Tunyiswa was born in 1962 in Middledrift in the former Cape Province. She completed an undergraduate degree from the University of the Western Cape and a Master's degree in public administration at the University of Fort Hare. A former teacher, she rose to political prominence through the Congress of South African Trade Unions and the affiliated South African Democratic Teachers' Union, both ANC allies.

== Political career ==
In the 2009 general election, Tunyiswa was elected to an ANC seat in the Eastern Cape Provincial Legislature, ranked 19th on the ANC's provincial party list. The following year, she was elected Deputy Speaker of the provincial legislature, succeeding Neo Moerane; the opposition Democratic Alliance said that her election was the result of "factional politics in the Tripartite Alliance". She was re-elected to the legislature in the 2014 general election, ranked 35th on the ANC's party list, and she continued to serve as Deputy Speaker.

On 10 May 2018, Tunyiswa was appointed to the Eastern Cape Executive Council by Phumulo Masualle, the incumbent Premier of the Eastern Cape, who made her MEC for Sports, Recreation, Arts and Culture. City Press reported that the ANC's provincial leadership, then headed by Oscar Mabuyane, had forced Masualle to effect the reshuffle. Tunyiswa served on the Executive Council for only a year: in the 2019 general election, she was ranked 51st on the ANC's party list and failed to gain re-election to the provincial legislature.

After her departure from the legislature, Tunyiswa continued to serve on the Central Committee of the SACP: she was elected to her third five-year term on the committee in 2022.
