= Ntombovuyo Nkopane =

South African politician

Ntombovuyo Nkopane MP

Member of the National Assembly of South Africa
- Incumbent
- Assumed office 14 June 2024

Eastern Cape MEC for Public Works and Infrastructure
- In office 16 August 2022 – 28 May 2024
- Premier: Oscar Mabuyane
- Preceded by: Babalo Madikizela
- Succeeded by: Siphokazi Mani-Lusithi

Personal details
- Party: ANC

Ntombovuyo Silberose Nkopane is a South African politician who has been a Member of the National Assembly of South Africa since 2024, representing the African National Congress. From 2014 until 2024, she was a member of the Eastern Cape Provincial Legislature. On 16 August 2022, she was appointed as the Member of the Executive Council (MEC) responsible for the Public Works and Infrastructure portfolio.
