= Nombulelo Mabandla =

South African politician

Member of the Eastern Cape Provincial Legislature
- In office May 2009 – 28 September 2011

Member of the Eastern Cape Executive Council for Human Settlements
- In office May 2009 – 27 November 2010
- Premier: Noxolo Kiviet
- Succeeded by: Helen Sauls-August (for Human Settlements, Safety and Liaison)

Personal details
- Born: 1969/1970 Chulunca, Cape Province; South Africa
- Died: 28 September 2011 (aged 41) Kokstad, KwaZulu-Natal
- Party: African National Congress

Mary Nombulelo Mabandla (died 28 September 2011) was a South African politician who represented the African National Congress (ANC) in the Eastern Cape Provincial Legislature from May 2009 until her death in September 2011. During that time, she served as the Eastern Cape's Member of the Executive Council (MEC) for Human Settlements between May 2009 and November 2010. Before her election to the provincial legislature, Mabandla was an ANC Youth League activist and a local councillor in Mhlontlo Local Municipality, her hometown.

== Early life and career ==
Mabandla was born in 1969 or 1970 in Chulunca in present-day Mhlontlo Local Municipality in the former Cape Province. She entered frontline politics through the ANC Youth League and served as Provincial Treasurer for the league's Eastern Cape branch. In the 2006 local elections, she was elected as a councillor in Mhlontlo and was appointed as a Member of the Mayoral Committee.

In the 2009 general election, she stood successfully for election to the Eastern Cape Provincial Legislature, ranked 23rd on the ANC's provincial party list. After the election, Premier Noxolo Kiviet announced that Mabandla would join the Eastern Cape Executive Council as MEC for Human Settlements. However, Mabandla held that office for less than two years: on 27 November 2010, Kiviet announced a major reshuffle in which Mabandla's portfolio was merged with the Safety and Liaison portfolio and Mabandla herself was fired from the Executive Council. She continued to serve as an ordinary Member of the Provincial Legislature until her death.

== Personal life and death ==
Mabandla died on 28 September 2011, aged 41. At the time of her death, she was in Kokstad on her way to Durban with her husband following a work trip to Port St. Johns. According to News24, she died "under mysterious circumstances": she reportedly died after taking water purification tablets, but an autopsy found that her injuries were consistent with strangulation. She was buried in Qumbu.

Mabandla had six children and was married twice: first in a customary marriage to Luxolo Manentsa in 1991 and then to Phumzile Mabandla in 2000. Her mother and her elder children later disputed the legal validity of her second marriage, claiming that Mabandla had left Manentsa in a quarrel but had never ended her first marriage. They also claimed that Phumzile Mabandla had been unable to produce a marriage certificate when attempting to claim Mabandla's body from the hospital in Kokstad. Following a dispute and a court application by Mabandla's family, a court annulled Mabandla's second marriage in May 2013.
