= Madikizela =

Madikizela is a surname. Notable people with the surname include:

- Babalo Madikizela, South African urban planner and politician
- Bonginkosi Madikizela, South African politician
- Pumla Gobodo-Madikizela (born 1955), South African psychologist
- Winnie Madikizela-Mandela (1936-2018), South African activist and politician
