= Pemmy Majodina =

South African politician (born 1968)

The Honourable Pemmy Majodina MP
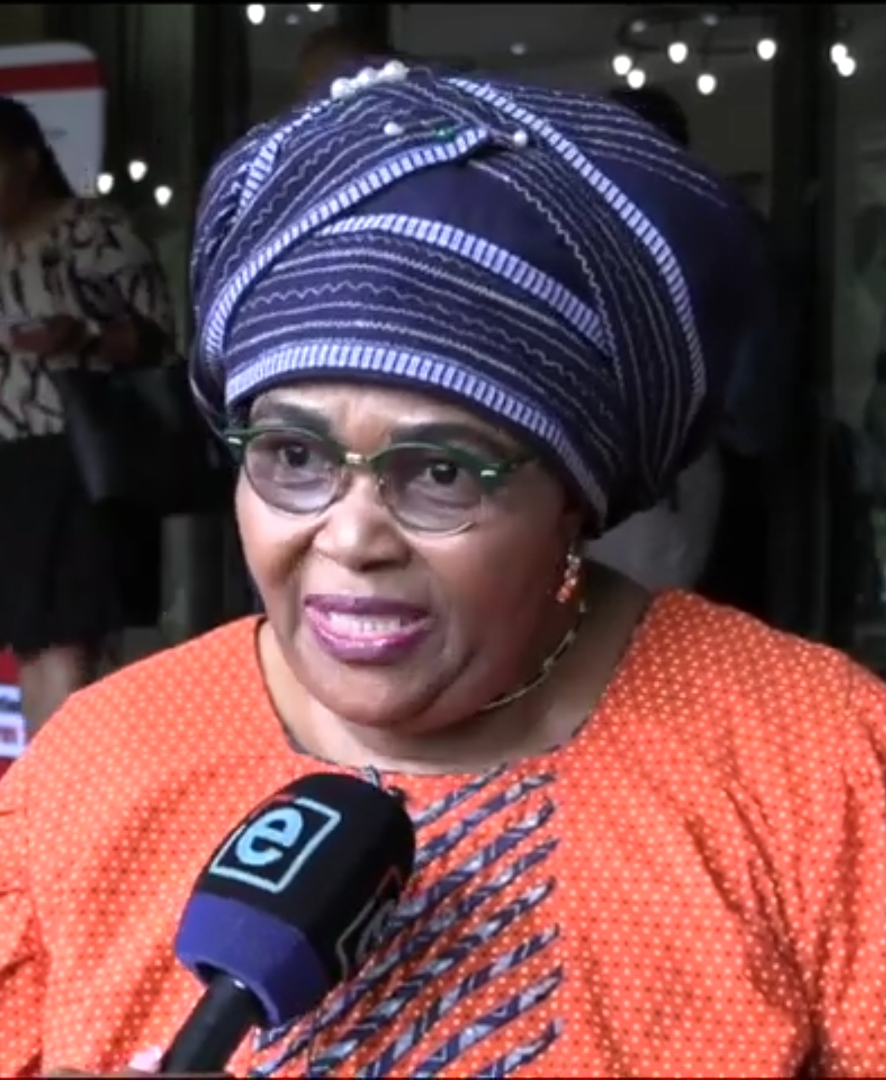
- Majodina in March 2026

Minister of Water and Sanitation
- Incumbent
- Assumed office 3 July 2024
- President: Cyril Ramaphosa
- Deputy: David Mahlobo; Isaac Seitlholo
- Preceded by: Senzo Mchunu

Chief Whip of the Majority Party
- In office 22 May 2019 – 14 June 2024
- Deputy: Doris Dlakude
- Preceded by: Jackson Mthembu
- Succeeded by: Mdumiseni Ntuli

Member of the National Assembly
- Incumbent
- Assumed office 22 May 2019

Personal details
- Born: 24 December 1968 (age 57) Sterkspruit, Cape Province, South Africa
- Party: African National Congress
- Education: National University of Lesotho

Pemmy Castelina Pamela Majodina (born 24 December 1968) is a South African politician from the Eastern Cape. A member of the African National Congress (ANC), she has been the Minister of Water and Sanitation since July 2024. Between May 2019 and June 2024, she was the Chief Whip of the Majority Party in the National Assembly of South Africa.

A teacher by profession, Majodina entered government as a member of the National Council of Provinces between 1999 and 2004. Thereafter, from 2004 to 2019, she represented the ANC in the Eastern Cape Provincial Legislature. Between 2008 and 2019 she held a series of five portfolios in the Executive Council of the Eastern Cape: she was Member of the Executive Council (MEC) for Health from 2008 to 2009, MEC for Roads and Public Works from 2009 to 2010, MEC for Social Development from 2010 to 2014, MEC for Sport, Recreation, Arts and Culture from 2014 to 2018, and finally MEC for Public Works again from 2018 to 2019.

She joined the National Assembly in the May 2019 general election and served as Chief Whip throughout the Sixth Parliament. After the May 2024 general election, President Cyril Ramaphosa appointed her to his multi-party cabinet as Minister of Water and Sanitation. She has been a member of the ANC National Executive Committee since December 2017 and a member of its National Working Committee since January 2023.

== Early life and activism ==
Majodina was born on 24 December 1968 in rural Sterkspruit in the former Cape Province. She was raised an orphan. She studied at the National University of Lesotho, completing a Bachelor of Education in 1996 and an Honours degree in 1998.

A teacher by profession, Majodina became politically active in the anti-apartheid movement. She served in underground structures of Umkhonto weSizwe, the armed wing of the African National Congress (ANC), and later held leadership positions in the South African Students Congress, the ANC Youth League, and the ANC Women's League. She was also a member of the South African Communist Party.

== Career in provincial politics ==
=== National Council of Provinces: 1999–2004 ===
After the June 1999 elections, Majodina was sworn in to Parliament as a delegate to the National Council of Provinces (NCOP). She represented the ANC as a member of the NCOP's Eastern Cape caucus. In 2001 she was appointed to the ANC caucus's newly established political committee.

During the Travelgate scandal, Majodina was served with summons in a lawsuit to retrieve improperly claimed travel expenses from Members of Parliament, though she was not among those who faced criminal charges.

=== Eastern Cape Provincial Legislature: 2004–2019 ===
In the April 2004 provincial election, Majodina was elected to an ANC seat in the Eastern Cape Provincial Legislature. After she was sworn in to her seat, she was elected as chairperson of the legislature's Portfolio Committee on Roads and Public Works, a position she held for the next four years. She continued her extra-parliamentary work with the ANC, and in December 2006 she was elected to a three-year term as Deputy Provincial Secretary of the Eastern Cape ANC.

She was promoted to the Executive Council of the Eastern Cape in August 2008, when Mbulelo Sogoni took office as Premier of the Eastern Cape; he named Majodina as Member of the Executive Council (MEC) for Health. After the April 2009 provincial election, Noxolo Kiviet became Premier and appointed Majodina as MEC for Roads and Public Works. In November 2010, Kiviet moved Majodina to a new portfolio as MEC for Social Development, Women, Youth and People with Disabilities.

Phumulo Masualle was elected Premier after the May 2014 election and he appointed Majodina as MEC for Sport, Recreation, Arts and Culture. While she was in that office, she was investigated by the Public Protector, Thuli Madonsela, on charges of misappropriating public funds during an official visit to New York in September 2012. Madonsela's report, completed in April 2015, found that Majodina had accepted an inappropriately large spending allowance during the visit and recommended that Masualle should take disciplinary steps against Majodina. She later paid back R15,000.

In December 2017 Majodina attended the ANC's 54th National Conference, where she was elected to the party's National Executive Committee. By number of votes received, she was ranked 74th of the committee's 80 ordinary members.

In May 2018, Masualle appointed her MEC for Public Works. She served in that office, her fifth and final position in the Executive Council, until the May 2019 general election.

== Career in national politics ==
=== National Assembly Chief Whip: 2019–2024 ===
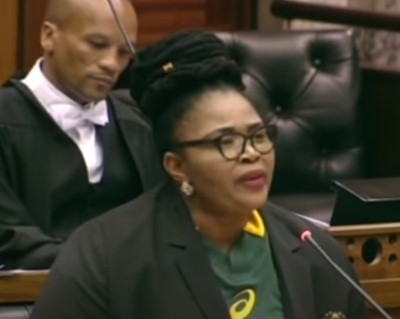
Majodina during a parliamentary debate in November 2019

In the 2019 general election, Majodina was elected to return to Parliament, now as a member of the National Assembly. The National Executive Committee of the African National Congress named her the party's chief whip in the National Assembly. She was the second woman to hold the post, after Nosiviwe Mapisa-Nqakula, and Doris Dlakude was named as her deputy. ANC secretary-general Ace Magashule said that she had been selected in part to promote youth representation in Parliament because of her prior participation in the youth movement; he said, "You will argue that she is not that young any longer, but she comes from that generation". She warned the ANC caucus to "move faster and better because we don't have time to play around".

The ANC's 55th National Conference was held in December 2022, and Majodina was re-elected to her second five-year term on the party's National Executive Committee; she received 1,470 votes across roughly 4,000 ballots, making her the 25th-most popular member of the committee. At the new committee's first meeting in February 2023, she was appointed as the committee's chief representative in Gauteng and as a member of the subcommittee on deployment. She was also elected to the party's influential 20-member National Working Committee.

During her tenure as chief whip, Majodina was twice implicated in minor corruption scandals, but she was cleared of wrongdoing on both occasions. First, in April 2021, she was accused of harboring an improper conflict of interest after press reported that her son, Mkhonto weSizwe Majodina, was the sole director of a company that had been awarded a R52,500 contract to supply thermometers to ANC constituency offices. Two of Majodina's critics inside the ANC caucus, Mervyn Dirks and Lawrence McDonald, laid complaints against her with the Public Protector and the South African Police. However, the Public Protector declined to investigate, pointing out that the contract, though funded by a public political party allowance, was not a public contract but a private contract of the ANC; after its own investigation, the ANC's internal Integrity Commission cleared Majodina of wrongdoing.

Two years later, in June 2023, Public Protector Busisiwe Mkhwebane laid a complaint against Majodina and two other ANC representatives, Richard Dyantyi and Tina Joemat-Pettersson, with Parliament's Joint Committee on Ethics and Members' Interests. Mkhwebane alleged that the trio had offered her husband a R600,000 bribe to influence an ongoing parliamentary inquiry into Mkhwebane's fitness to hold office. The committee cleared Majodina, saying that the claim was unfounded.

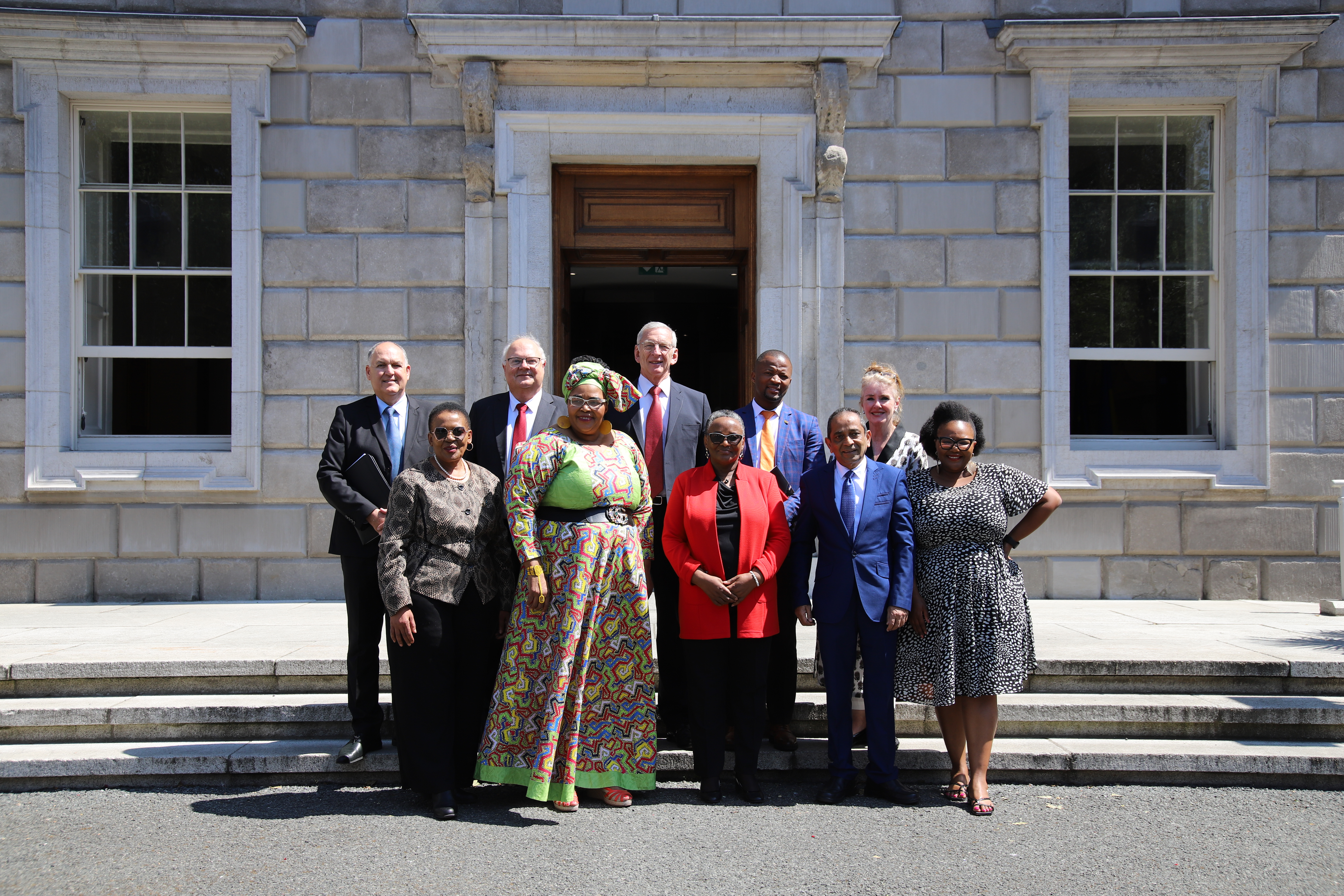
Majodina (third from left) on a visit to Leinster House with opposition party whips in June 2023

Majodina remained in office as chief whip throughout the Sixth Parliament, becoming the first person to complete a full five-year term in the office. However, some commentators argued that she had lacked gravitas in the position and criticized her "vacuous" public defense of President Cyril Ramaphosa.

=== Minister of Water and Sanitation: 2024–present ===
Majodina was re-elected to the National Assembly in the May 2024 general election, and President Ramaphosa appointed her to succeed Senzo Mchunu as Minister of Water and Sanitation in his new multi-party cabinet. She was sworn in as a minister on 3 July. During her first year in office, Majodina oversaw the establishment of the new South African National Water Resources Infrastructure Agency.

== Honours ==
In 2015, Jesse Jackson awarded her with a Global Humanitarian Award.

== Personal life ==
Majodina is a member of the Methodist Church of Southern Africa and is a lay preacher at her local church in Bensonvale, Sterkspruit, which gave her a community service award in 2011. She is estranged from her husband and has nine children, seven of whom she adopted. She is known for her flamboyant fashion sense.
