= Fezeka Nkomonye-Bayeni =

South African politician

Fezeka Nkomonye MPL

Eastern Cape MEC for Sports, Recreation, Arts and Culture
- In office 29 May 2019 – 16 August 2022
- Premier: Oscar Mabuyane
- Preceded by: Bulelwa Tunyiswa
- Succeeded by: Nonceba Kontsiwe

Member of the Eastern Cape Provincial Legislature
- Incumbent
- Assumed office 21 May 2014
- In office 6 May 2009 – 2010

Personal details
- Born: Fezeka Nkomonye; 29 August 1981 (age 45)
- Party: African National Congress; South African Communist Party
- Education: University of Durban-Westville (BA)
- Occupation: Politician

Fezeka Nkomonye-Bayeni (born 29 August 1981) is a South African politician who served the Member of the Executive Council (MEC) for Sports, Recreation, Arts and Culture in the Eastern Cape from 2019 until 2022. She has been a member of the Eastern Cape Provincial Legislature since 2014, and previously from 2009 to 2010. Nkomonye-Bayeni is a member of the African National Congress.

== Early life and education ==
Nkomonye-Bayeni was born on 29 August 1981. She earned a Bachelor of Arts (BA) degree from the University of Durban-Westville. She is currently studying for a Master's degree in Development Studies through Nelson Mandela Metropolitan University.

== Political career ==
Nkomonye-Bayeni had worked as a Senior Operations Officer at the Ingquza Hill Local Municipality. In 2009 Nkomonye-Bayeni was elected as a Member of the Eastern Cape Provincial Legislature as a member of the African National Congress. She was the youngest legislator elected in the election. In 2010 she resigned from the legislature to take up the position of head of the ministry in the office of the Member of the Executive Council (MEC) for the Eastern Cape Department of Provincial Planning and Treasury.

In 2014 Nkomonye-Bayeni was elected to return to the legislature. She was a member of the women's caucus, public accounts, oversight, public works, finance and provincial expenditure, and sports, recreation, arts, and culture committees. After her re-election in 2019, Nkomonye-Bayeni was appointed MEC for Sport, Recreation, Arts and Culture. On 18 June 2021, Nkomonye-Bayeni inaugurated the Eastern Cape Provincial Geographical Names Committee (ECPGNC) council in Bhisho, the provincial capital.

On 16 August 2022, Nonceba Kontsiwe was announced as the new MEC for Sports, Recreation, Arts and Culture, succeeding Nkomonye-Bayeni.

== Personal life ==
Nkomonye-Bayeni is a runner and has participated in multiple marathons. She tested positive for COVID-19 in November 2020, during the COVID-19 pandemic in South Africa.
