= Ntandokazi Capa =

South African politician (born 1977)

Ntandokazi Capa MPL

Member of the Executive Council of the Eastern Cape for Health
- Incumbent
- Assumed office 21 June 2024
- Premier: Oscar Mabuyane
- Preceded by: Nomakhosazana Meth

Member of the Eastern Cape Provincial Legislature
- Incumbent
- Assumed office 14 June 2024

Personal details
- Born: 10 March 1977 (age 49) Flagstaff, Cape Province, South Africa
- Party: African National Congress
- Relations: Ndumiso Capa (father); Rosemary Capa (mother)
- Profession: Politician

Ntandokazi Yolisa Capa (born 10 March 1977) is a South African politician who has been the Member of the Eastern Cape Executive Council for Health since 2024. A member of the African National Congress, she was elected to the Eastern Cape Provincial Legislature in the 2024 provincial election. Capa was involved in the local politics of the OR Tambo District Municipality before being elected to the provincial legislature.

== Early life and background ==
Capa was born in Flagstaff in the Cape Province of South Africa. Both of her parents Ndumiso Capa and Rosemary Capa are African National Congress politicians.

== Political career ==
Capa was elected as an ANC councillor in the Ingquza Hill Local Municipality in 2011. She was elected council speaker of the municipality following the municipal elections in 2016. In April 2020, she missed a deadline to explain to the Eastern Cape MEC for Cooperative Governance and Traditional Affairs Xolile Nqatha why she broke COVID-19 lockdown regulations by attending a Good Friday church service organised by the municipality. In August 2021, she was elected mayor of the Ingquza Hill Local Municipality, becoming the first woman to hold the position. Following the municipal elections that were held three months later, Capa was elected speaker of the OR Tambo District Municipality. In July 2023, she was elected chairperson of the African National Congress Women's League in the Eastern Cape.

Capa topped the ANC's candidate list for the Eastern Cape Provincial Legislature in the 2024 provincial election and was easily elected to the provincial legislature. A week after her swearing-in as a member of the provincial legislature, Eastern Cape premier Oscar Mabuyane announced his executive council which saw Capa appointed as the Member of the Executive Council for Health.
