= Ghishma Barry =

South African politician

Member of the Eastern Cape Executive Council for Transport and Safety
- In office May 2009 – 27 November 2010
- Premier: Noxolo Kiviet
- Preceded by: Thobile Mhlahlo (for Safety, Liaison and Human Settlement)
- Succeeded by: Position abolished

Personal details
- Died: 24 November 2017
- Citizenship: South Africa
- Party: African National Congress

Gloria Ghishma Barry (died 24 November 2017) was a South African politician who represented the African National Congress (ANC) in the Eastern Cape Provincial Legislature. She served as the Eastern Cape's Member of the Executive Council (MEC) for Transport and Safety under Premier Noxolo Kiviet from May 2009 to November 2010. A founding member of the National Union of Metalworkers of South Africa, she was also a former member of the Provincial Executive Committee of the ANC's Eastern Cape branch.

== Early career ==
Barry was one of the founding members of the National Union of Metalworkers of South Africa and served as its Regional Secretary. After the ANC was unbanned in 1990, she joined its interim leadership corps in the Eastern Cape. After the end of apartheid, she was elected to represent the party in the Eastern Cape Provincial Legislature, where she served for a period as Deputy Speaker. She also served as a member of the Provincial Executive Committee of the Eastern Cape ANC.

== Executive Council ==
Barry was appointed to the Eastern Cape Executive Council after the 2009 general election, when Premier Noxolo Kiviet named her as MEC for Transport and Safety. Under Barry's leadership, the Department of Transport and Safety completed a R100-million upgrade to the East London Airport and launched a R3-billion ten-year plan for infrastructure investment. However, Barry was in office for less than two years: on 27 November 2010, Kiviet announced a major reshuffle in which she was removed from the Executive Council and her former portfolio was abolished.

== Death ==
Barry died on the morning of 24 November 2017 after a long illness with cancer. She was Muslim and her funeral service was held at Gavin Park Mosque in Port Elizabeth.
