= Mcebisi =

Mcebisi is a South African masculine given name. Notable people with the name include:

- Mcebisi Jonas (born 1960), South African politician
- Mcebisi Skwatsha (born 1964), South African politician
