= Nomakhosazana Meth =

South African politician (born 1966)

The Honourable Nomakhosazana Meth MP

Minister of Employment and Labour
- Incumbent
- Assumed office 3 July 2024
- President: Cyril Ramaphosa
- Deputy: Jomo Sibiya; Judith Tshabalala
- Preceded by: Thulas Nxesi

Member of the National Assembly
- Incumbent
- Assumed office 14 June 2024

Eastern Cape MEC for Health
- In office 9 March 2021 – 28 May 2024
- Premier: Oscar Mabuyane
- Preceded by: Sindiswa Gomba
- Succeeded by: Ntandokazi Capa

Eastern Cape MEC for Rural Development and Agrarian Reform
- In office 29 May 2019 – 9 March 2021
- Premier: Oscar Mabuyane
- Preceded by: Xolile Nqatha
- Succeeded by: Nonkqubela Pieters

Member of the Eastern Cape Provincial Legislature
- In office 22 May 2019 – 28 May 2024

Personal details
- Born: 1 July 1966 (age 60) Ntabankulu, Cape Province; South Africa
- Party: African National Congress
- Parent: Cromwell Diko
- Education: University of Fort Hare
- Profession: Politician

Nomakhosazana Meth (born 1 July 1966) is a South African politician from the Eastern Cape who has served as Minister of Employment and Labour since July 2024. A member of the African National Congress, she joined the cabinet shortly after her election to the National Assembly of South Africa in May 2024.

Before she joined Parliament, Meth represented the ANC in the Eastern Cape Provincial Legislature from 2019 to 2024, during which time she served in the Eastern Cape Executive Council. Before that she was the mayor of Mbizana Local Municipality in the Eastern Cape.

== Early life and education ==
Meth was born on 1 July 1966 in Ntabankulu in the present-day Eastern Cape. She was one of dozens of children born to Cromwell Diko, a prominent politician in the Transkei.

She holds an honours degree in public administration from the University of Fort Hare, as well as various tertiary certificates from Fort Hare, the University of Zululand, and the University of Pretoria.

== Political career ==
=== Local government ===
A long-standing member of the African National Congress (ANC), Meth served as the speaker of the Mbizana Local Municipality from 2006 to 2008. Thereafter she was a councillor in the OR Tambo District Municipality, where she was elected speaker after the 2011 municipal election and elected mayor after the 2016 municipal election. She also served as the chairperson of the ANC Women's League in the OR Tambo region from 2008 to 2014, and as provincial chairperson of the South African Local Government Association in the Eastern Cape from 2011 to 2016.

=== Provincial government ===
In the provincial election of 8 May 2019, Meth stood for election to the Eastern Cape Provincial Legislature, ranked fourth on the ANC's provincial party list. She was comfortably elected and was sworn in as an MPL on 22 May 2019. On 28 May, newly elected provincial premier Oscar Mabuyane appointed her as Member of the Executive Council (MEC) for Rural Development and Agrarian Reform, with effect from the next day.

On 9 March 2021, Meth was appointed as MEC for Health, replacing Sindiswa Gomba. Nonkqubela Pieters took over as the Rural Development and Agrarian Reform MEC.

While in that position, she attended the ANC's 55th National Conference in December 2022, where she was elected to a five-year term on the ANC National Executive Committee (NEC). She received 997 votes across roughly 4,000 ballots, making her the 74th-most popular member of the 80-member committee.

=== National government ===
Meth was elected to the National Assembly in the May 2024 general election. President Cyril Ramaphosa appointed her as Minister of Employment and Labour in his coalition cabinet.

== Personal life ==
On 5 January 2019, Meth's two sons died in a car accident in Mthatha. She tested positive for COVID-19 in July 2020, in one of the early reports of politicians testing positive during the pandemic.
