= Bukiwe Fanta =

South African politician (born 1957)

Bukiwe Fanta MPL

Member of the Eastern Cape Executive Council for Social Development
- Incumbent
- Assumed office 16 August 2022
- Premier: Oscar Mabuyane
- Preceded by: Siphokazi Mani-Lusithi

Member of the Eastern Cape Provincial Legislature
- Incumbent
- Assumed office 22 May 2019

Member of the National Assembly of South Africa
- In office 21 February 2019 – 7 May 2019

Personal details
- Born: Gloria Bukiwe Fanta; 28 August 1957 (age 69)
- Party: African National Congress

Gloria Bukiwe Fanta (born 28 August 1957) is a South African politician who has served in the Eastern Cape provincial government as the Member of the Executive Council (MEC) for Social Development since August 2022. She has been a member of the Eastern Cape Provincial Legislature since May 2019. Before joining the provincial legislature, Fanta had briefly been a Member of Parliament for less than three months, serving from February until May 2019. Fanta is the current provincial co-ordinator and former provincial chairperson of the African National Congress Women's League.

== Political career ==
In May 2015, at the provincial elective conference of the African National Congress Women's League, Fanta was elected as the new provincial chairperson of the women's league.

Following senior ANC MP Zukile Luyenge's defection to the African Transformation Movement and consequent resignation from the National Assembly of South Africa, Fanta was elected to take up his seat in Parliament. She became a Member of Parliament on 21 February 2019. Fanta did not serve as an MP for long as the national and provincial elections in May 2019 were less than three months away. She was number 11 on the ANC's list for the Eastern Cape Provincial Legislature; she was elected to the provincial legislature as the ANC won 44 seats. She was subsequently appointed to head the legislature's women caucus.

At the ANC's provincial elective conference in May 2022, Fanta was re-elected as a member of the ANC's Provincial Executive Committee. Fanta then became the provincial co-ordinator of the ANC Women's League Task Team in July 2022 following the dissolution of its leadership structure.

== Provincial government ==
In August 2022, re-elected ANC provincial chairman Oscar Mabuyane carried out a reshuffle of his executive council, removing all the MECs aligned to his unsuccessful challenger at the provincial conference in May, Babalo Madikizela. Fanta, who was seen as an ally of Mabuyane, was appointed Member of the Executive Council for Social Development; she replaced Siphokazi Mani-Lusithi who was moved to the human settlements portfolio.

Following the 2024 general election, Mabuyane was re-elected as premier; he announced his new executive council shortly afterwards which saw Fanta reappointed as the MEC for Social Development.
