= Fikile Xasa =

South African politician

Chairperson of the Portfolio Committee on Cooperative Governance and Traditional Affairs
- In office 31 August 2021 – 28 May 2024
- Preceded by: Faith Muthambi
- Succeeded by: Zweli Mkhize

Chairperson of the Portfolio Committee on Environment, Forestry and Fisheries
- In office 2 July 2019 – 31 August 2021
- Preceded by: Committee established
- Succeeded by: Faith Muthambi

Member of the National Assembly of South Africa
- In office 22 May 2019 – 28 May 2024

Eastern Cape MEC for Cooperative Governance and Traditional Affairs
- In office 23 May 2014 – 8 May 2019
- Preceded by: Mlibo Qoboshiyane
- Succeeded by: Xolile Nqatha

Personal details
- Born: Fikile Devilliers Xasa
- Party: African National Congress

Fikile Devilliers Xasa is a South African politician who served as the Chairperson of the Portfolio Committee on Cooperative Governance and Traditional Affairs from 2021 until 2024 and a Member of the National Assembly for the African National Congress from 2019 until 2024.

== Political career ==
Xasa had served as an ANC Member of the Eastern Cape Provincial Legislature. In May 2014, he was appointed by premier Phumulo Masualle as the Member of the Executive Council (MEC) responsible for Cooperative Governance and Traditional Affairs.

Xasa was elected to the National Assembly in the 2019 general election from the ANC's National List. He was elected to chair the Portfolio Committee on Environment, Forestry and Fisheries.

On 26 August 2021, the ANC announced that Xasa and the Chairperson of the Portfolio Committee on Cooperative Governance and Traditional Affairs, Faith Muthambi, would swap positions.

Xasa did not stand for reelection in 2024.
