= Sibulele Ngongo =

South African politician

Sibulele Ngongo MPL

Member of the Executive Council of the Eastern Cape for Sport, Recreation, Arts, and Culture
- Incumbent
- Assumed office 21 June 2024
- Premier: Oscar Mabuyane
- Preceded by: Nonceba Kontsiwe

Member of the Eastern Cape Provincial Legislature
- Incumbent
- Assumed office 14 June 2024

Personal details
- Party: African National Congress
- Profession: Politician

Sibulele Ngongo is a South African politician who has been the Eastern Cape's Member of the Executive Council for Sport, Recreation, Arts, and Culture since June 2024. A member of the African National Congress, she was elected to the Eastern Cape Provincial Legislature in the 2024 provincial election. Prior to her election to the provincial legislature, she worked as a private secretary to former MEC for Health, Nomakhosazana Meth.
