= Nonkqubela Pieters =

South African politician and educator (born 1965)

Nonkqubela Pieters MPL

Eastern Cape MEC for Economic Development, Environmental Affairs and Tourism
- Incumbent
- Assumed office 21 June 2024
- Premier: Oscar Mabuyane
- Preceded by: Office established

Eastern Cape MEC for Rural Development and Agrarian Reform
- In office 9 March 2021 – 14 June 2024
- Premier: Oscar Mabuyane
- Preceded by: Nomakhosazana Meth
- Succeeded by: Nonceba Kontsiwe

Eastern Cape MEC for Human Settlements
- In office 29 May 2019 – 9 March 2021
- Premier: Oscar Mabuyane
- Preceded by: Babalo Madikizela
- Succeeded by: Nonceba Kontsiwe

Member of the Eastern Cape Provincial Legislature
- Incumbent
- Assumed office 22 May 2019

Personal details
- Born: Nonkqubela Ntomboxolo Pieters Somerset East, Cape Province, South Africa
- Party: African National Congress
- Education: Cape College of Education; University of Port Elizabeth; Rhodes University; Wits Business School; University of Fort Hare
- Occupation: Educator, politician

Nonkqubela Ntomboxolo Pieters (born 12 April 1965) is a South African politician and educator who has been the Eastern Cape's Member of the Executive Council (MEC) for Economic Development, Environmental Affairs and Tourism since 2024 and a member of the Eastern Cape Provincial Legislature since 2019, representing the African National Congress (ANC). She previously served as the MEC for Human Settlements from 2019 to 2021 and then as the MEC for Rural Development and Agrarian Reform from 2021 until 2024. Pieters served as the speaker of the Cacadu District Municipality (later renamed to the Sarah Baartman District Municipality) from 2006 to 2018.

In 2022, she focused on improving rural areas in terms of plant production and animal production programs

== Early life and education ==
Pieters was born in Somerset East. and attended schools in the same area . Between 1988 and 1990 she studied at the Cape College of Education and graduated with a senior teachers' diploma. Pieters earned a certificate in Maths 1 at the University of Port Elizabeth in 1999. She studied at Rhodes University between 1998 and 2001 and graduated with a further diploma in education in 1999 and a Honours degree in education in 2001. At the Wits Business School, she did a certificate programme in management development (CPMD – Municipal Finance) in 2010 and a certificate programme in leadership development (CPLD) in 2011. In 2015 Pieters received a Master of Public Administration from the University of Fort Hare.

== Early career ==
Pieters worked as an educator at the Johnson Nqonqoza Senior Secondary School from 1991 and 2006 and was the principal of the Bosberg Adult Centre from 1997 to 1999.

== Political career ==
In 1984 Pieters became a Congress of South African Students and joined the Somerset East Youth Congress the following year. She served as an executive member of the Somerset East Woman Organization (which later became part of the African National Congress Women's League). Pieters was a member of the South African National Students Congress (SANSCO) (now known as the South African Students Congress (SASCO)) and was responsible for political classes at her residence at the Cape College of Education between 1988 and 1990.

From 1991 to 2006, she was a member of the South African Democratic Teachers Union (SADTU) and served in the following positions. She was the branch secretary of the organisation's Somerset East branch from 1991 to 1994, gender desk convenor of the SADTU branch from 1994 to 2003, and the chairperson of the SADTU Somerset East branch and Western Region from 1999 to 2003. Pieters was the branch secretary of the South African Communist Party (SACP) Somerset East Branch from 1991 to 1993 and she was the executive member of the SACP's former Eastern Cape Region from 1993 to 1995.

In 2006 she was elected as the speaker of the Cacadu District Municipality. The district municipality was renamed Sarah Baartman in 2015. Pieters served as the portfolio councillor for the Health Department from 2006 to 2007, when she appointed as the portfolio councillor for the office of mayor, a position she held until 2009 when she was named as the portfolio councillor for financial & corporate services. She was the portfolio councillor for that portfolio until 2016.

Pieters had served in the role of speaker for nearly twelve years before she resigned to take up the position of Parliamentary Liaison Officer at the Department of Human Settlements in December 2018.

Pieters was elected treasurer of the African National Congress Women's League in the Eastern Cape during the league's conference held in July 2023.

=== Provincial government ===
Pieters was elected as a member of the Eastern Cape Provincial Legislature in 2019. Pieters was appointed to the role of Member of the Executive Council (MEC) for Human Settlements by the newly elected premier, Oscar Mabuyane.

In March 2021, she was appointed as the MEC responsible for Rural Development and Agrarian Reform, replacing Nomakhosazana Meth, who was appointed Health MEC.

After the 2024 general election, Pieters was sworn in as the MEC responsible for Economic Development, Environmental Affairs, and Tourism, while Nonceba Kontsiwe was taken over as the MEC for Rural Development and Agrarian Reform.
