= Mlungisi Mvoko =

South African politician (born 1959)

Mlungisi Mvoko MPL

Eastern Cape MEC for Finance
- Incumbent
- Assumed office 21 June 2024
- Premier: Oscar Mabuyane
- Preceded by: Office reestablished

Eastern Cape MEC for Finance, Economic Development and Environmental Affairs
- In office 29 May 2019 – 14 June 2024
- Premier: Oscar Mabuyane
- Preceded by: Oscar Mabuyane
- Succeeded by: Office abolished

Eastern Cape MEC for Education
- In office 21 November 2018 – 29 May 2019
- Premier: Phumulo Masualle
- Preceded by: Mandla Makupula
- Succeeded by: Fundile Gade

Eastern Cape MEC for Human Settlements
- In office May 2018 – 21 November 2018
- Premier: Phumulo Masualle
- Preceded by: Helen Sauls-August
- Succeeded by: Babalo Madikizela

Deputy Provincial Chairperson of the African National Congress
- Incumbent
- Assumed office 1 October 2017
- Preceded by: Sakhumzi Somyo

Member of the Eastern Cape Provincial Legislature
- Incumbent
- Assumed office 19 February 2018

Personal details
- Born: Gerald Mlungisi Mvoko; 2 May 1959 (age 67) Somerset East, Cape Province, South Africa
- Party: African National Congress
- Spouse: Balise
- Profession: Politician

Gerald Mlungisi Mvoko (born 2 May 1959) is a South African businessman and politician who was elected deputy provincial chairperson of the African National Congress in the Eastern Cape in October 2017. In February 2018, he was sworn in as a member of the Eastern Cape Provincial Legislature. He became the member of the Executive Council (MEC) for Human Settlements in May 2018 before being moved to the Education portfolio in November of the same year. Mvoko became the MEC for Finance, Economic Development and Environmental Affairs in May 2019 and served in the position until May 2024, when he was appointed MEC for Finance.

== Early life ==
Mvoko hails from Somerset East in the Eastern Cape. He studied to be an educator. He worked for the New Education South Africa organisation and formed part of the establishment of the South African Democratic Teachers Union in the 1990s.

== Political career ==
Mvoko was the chair of the ANC Sarah Baartman branch for three terms. He was first elected in 2006 and re-elected in 2012 and 2015. He served two terms as mayor of the Cacadu District Municipality until 2011. During this time, Mvoko was also the CEO of the Cacadu Development Agency. In October 2017, he was elected, the deputy provincial chairperson of the ANC, succeeding Sakhumzi Somyo.

In February 2018, Mvoko and ANC provincial chairperson Oscar Mabuyane were sworn in as Members of the Eastern Cape Provincial Legislature. The provincial ANC structure recommended that he be appointed to the provincial cabinet as the MEC for Finance. Incumbent Premier Phumulo Masualle reshuffled his executive in May 2018, in which he appointed Mvoko as the MEC for Human Settlements. He served until November when Masualle made him the MEC for Education. Mvoko held the post for just over sixth months as newly elected Premier Mabuyane selected him to be the MEC for Finance in May 2019.

On 9 May 2022, Mvoko was re-elected to a second term as the deputy provincial chairperson of the ANC.

Following the 2024 general election, premier Mabuyane reconfigured the Department of Finance, Economic Development, Environmental Affairs and Tourism and appointed Mvoko as the MEC for Finance.

== Personal life ==
On 19 June 2020, Mvoko and his wife, Balise, tested positive for COVID-19.
