= Ndumiso Capa =

South African politician

Member of the National Assembly of South Africa
- In office 21 May 2014 – 28 May 2024
- Constituency: Eastern Cape

Personal details
- Born: Ndumiso Capa; 25 September 1949 (age 76) Flagstaff, Cape Province
- Party: African National Congress
- Spouse: Rosemary Capa
- Occupation: Politician

Ndumiso Capa (born 25 September 1949) is a South African politician from the Eastern Cape who served as a Member of the National Assembly of South Africa from 2014 until 2024, representing the African National Congress, the ruling party in South Africa.

== Early life and education ==
Capa was born on 25 September 1949 in Flagstaff in the former Cape Province (which became the Eastern Cape in 1994). He holds an honours degree in agriculture.

== Political career ==
Capa has served as the chairperson of the African National Congress branch in ward 9 in the Ingquza Hill Local Municipality, as a member of the regional executive committee of the ANC, and as a member of the party's provincial executive committee.

== Parliamentary career ==
Capa stood as an ANC parliamentary candidate from the Eastern Cape in the 2014 national elections, and was subsequently elected to the National Assembly and sworn in on 21 May 2014.

On 20 June 2014, he named to the Portfolio Committee on Human Settlements. On 4 April 2016, he became a member of the Portfolio Committee on Agriculture, Forestry and Fisheries and the Portfolio Committee on Small Business Development. He left the Portfolio Committee on Human Settlements on 6 May 2016. Capa was then a member of those two committees until the dissolution of the term.

He was re-elected for a second term in the 2019 general election. Capa was sworn in for his second term on 22 May 2019. On 27 June 2019, he was named to the Portfolio Committee on Agriculture, Land Reform and Rural Development and the Portfolio Committee on Environment, Forestry and Fisheries. He became a member of the Joint Committee on Ethics and Members' Interests in August 2019.

In February 2021, Capa cautioned the Ingonyama Trust not to undermine the work of the Auditor-General.

Capa was not included on the ANC's parliamentary candidate list for the 2024 general election and left parliament at the election.

== Personal life ==
Capa is married to Rosemary Capa, who serves as the Deputy Minister of Agriculture, Rural Development and Land Reform. He lives in Flagstaff.
