= Mcebisi Jonas =

South African politician and businessman (born 1960)

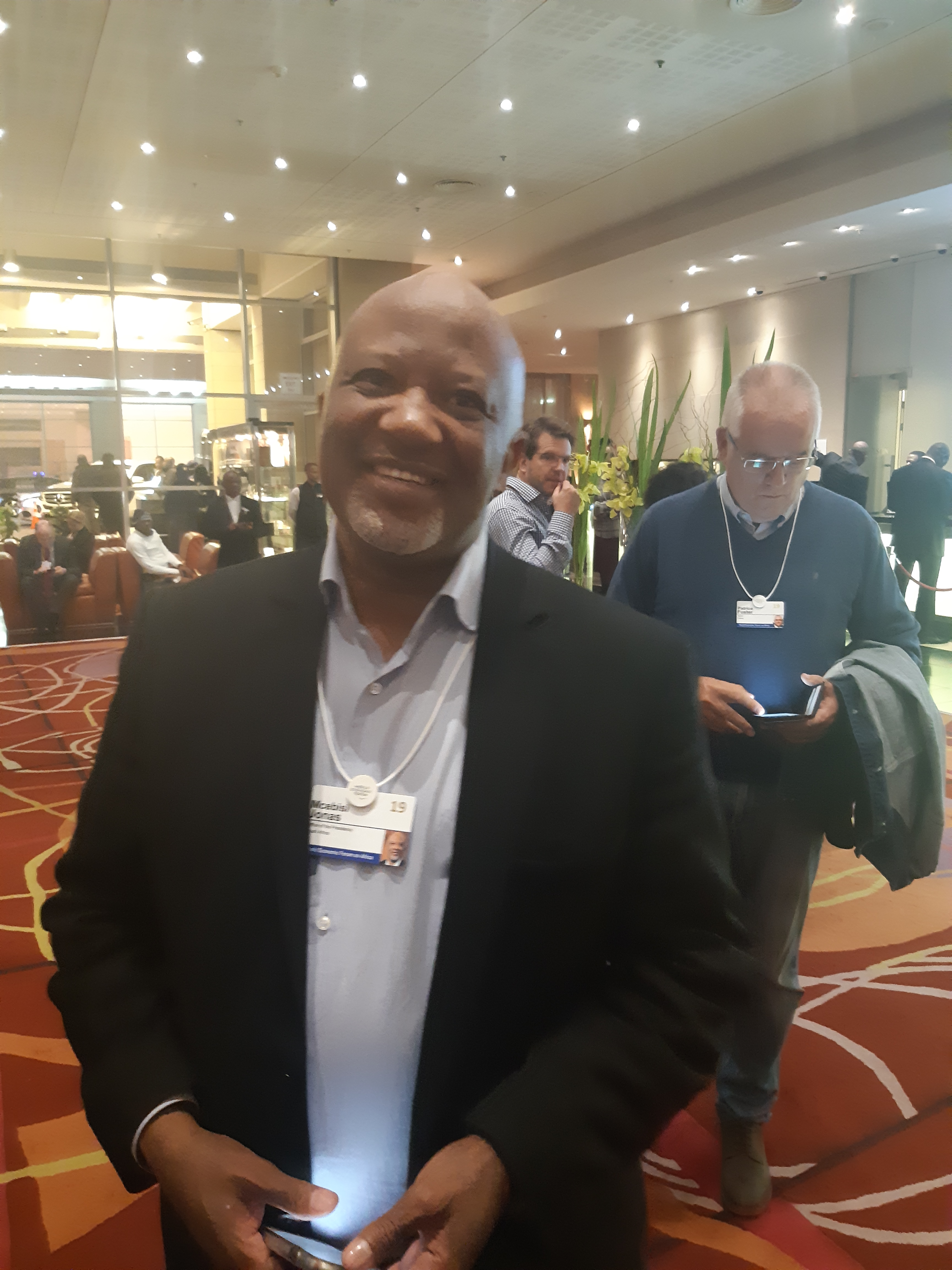
- Jonas in September 2019

Deputy Minister of Finance
- In office 26 May 2014 – 31 March 2017
- President: Jacob Zuma
- Minister: Nhlanhla Nene; Des van Rooyen; Pravin Gordhan
- Preceded by: Nhlanhla Nene
- Succeeded by: Sfiso Buthelezi

Member of the National Assembly

Assembly Member for Eastern Cape
- In office 21 May 2014 – 31 March 2017

Personal details
- Born: Mcebisi Hubert Jonas; 1960 (age 65–66) Uitenhage
- Party: African National Congress
- Spouse: Matshepo Jonas
- Children: Samkelo Jonas
- Education: Vista University; Rhodes University

Mcebisi Hubert Jonas (born 1960) is a South African politician and businessman who was Deputy Minister of Finance of South Africa between May 2014 and March 2017. He is the independent non-executive chairman of MTN Group. He is best known as a state capture whistleblower. In 2016, he publicly alleged that the Gupta brothers had offered him the post of finance minister under President Jacob Zuma.

Born in the Eastern Cape, Jonas was an anti-apartheid activist in Port Elizabeth and a founding member of the United Democratic Front. A former head of the Eastern Cape Development Corporation, he joined the Eastern Cape Provincial Legislature as a representative of the African National Congress (ANC). Between 2009 and 2014, he was a Member of the Executive Council of the Eastern Cape under Premier Noxolo Kiviet. He launched two unsuccessful campaigns to become provincial chairperson of the Eastern Cape ANC, in 2006 and 2009 respectively.

Jonas joined the National Assembly in the 2014 general election and was appointed as Deputy Minister of Finance under President Zuma's second cabinet. Zuma sacked him on 31 March 2017, alongside Finance Minister Pravin Gordhan, and he resigned from Parliament shortly thereafter. He has since launched a career in business, running Ntiso Investment Holdings. He was appointed as special investment envoy to President Cyril Ramaphosa in April 2018 and as board chairperson of the MTN Group in December 2019.

== Early life and activism ==
Jonas was born in 1960 in Uitenhage in the former Cape Province (now the Eastern Cape). He matriculated at Newell High School in Port Elizabeth and studied history and sociology at Vista University, where he completed a Bachelor of Arts. He later obtained a higher diploma in education at Rhodes University.

Jonas became active in politics as a teenager in Port Elizabeth during apartheid. In the early 1980s, he was involved in the Black Consciousness Movement, including as an organiser in the Azanian Students' Organisation, and he was a founding member of the Eastern Cape branch of the United Democratic Front. He later went into exile with Umkhonto we Sizwe (MK), the armed wing of the African National Congress (ANC). According to his official résumé, he received military training in Angola and Uganda and was recruited by the United Nations to run an educational programme for his fellow MK cadres. He returned to South Africa during the negotiations to end apartheid and became active in the newly legalised activities of the ANC and South African Communist Party in the Eastern Cape.

== Early post-apartheid career ==
During the early post-apartheid era, Jonas held a series of positions in development planning in the Eastern Cape. Among other positions, he was a general manager at Afesis-corplan, then the CEO at the Eastern Cape Socio-Economic Consultative Council from 1997 to 1999, and then the CEO of the Centre for Investment and Marketing in the Eastern Cape from 1999 to 2000. Between 2000 and 2004, he was CEO of the Eastern Cape Development Corporation (ECDC), a state-owned entity. In addition, he was a member of the ANC's Provincial Executive Committee in the Eastern Cape between 1997 and 2004.

Jonas left the ECDC acrimoniously, sacked during a board meeting in November 2004. His dismissal was viewed as part of a "purge" inside the ANC, led by Eastern Cape Premier Nosimo Balindlela and targeting allies of Balindlela's rivals, Enoch Godongwana and Makhenkesi Stofile. After his departure from ECDC, Jonas and two senior ECDC officials were indicted on criminal charges, accused of defrauding investors in a deal in which ECDC had been involved. In September 2005, the charges against them were dismissed, with Eastern Cape High Court judge Dayalin Chetty finding that there was "not a shred of evidence even remotely implicating the accused".

In December 2006, Jonas attended the ANC's provincial elective conference at Fort Hare in Alice, where he was one of two candidates for election as provincial chairperson of the Eastern Cape ANC. Jonas was viewed as aligned to ascendant national politician Jacob Zuma, while his opponent, Stone Sizani, was a supporter of incumbent president Thabo Mbeki, Zuma's primary rival. He also had the support of the outgoing provincial chairperson, Makhenkesi Stofile. However, Sizani beat him by just under 200 votes, across a total of 1,509 ballots.

Nonetheless, in 2007, Jonas returned to the ANC Provincial Executive Committee. Later that year he joined the Eastern Cape Provincial Legislature, filling an ANC seat, and he chaired the legislature's Portfolio Committee on Human Settlements for the next two years.

== Eastern Cape Executive Council: 2009–2014 ==
Jonas was elected to a full term in the Eastern Cape Legislature in the April 2009 general election. At this point, Jonas's political influence in the province was at its peak, and the Mail & Guardian viewed him as a frontrunner for election as Premier of the Eastern Cape. Noxolo Kiviet was elected instead, and in May 2009 she appointed him to the Eastern Cape Executive Council as Member of the Executive Council (MEC) for Finance, Economic Development, and Environmental Affairs.

The ANC's next provincial elective conference was held in East London in September 2009. In a fierce contest, Jonas stood for the provincial chairmanship, running against his colleague in the Executive Council, Phumulo Masualle. Running on an anti-communist platform, Jonas was the presumed frontrunner in the race, having won the support of most of the incumbent government, as well as of the party's large branches in the Amathole District and O. R. Tambo District. However, the vote was apparently swayed by Masualle's decision to select national minister Gugile Nkwinti as his running mate, and Masualle defeated Jonas, receiving 1,031 votes to his 930. Jonas also failed to gain re-election to the Provincial Executive Committee.

On 27 November 2010, Premier Kiviet announced a major reshuffle of the provincial government. In the reshuffle, the prestigious finance portfolio was removed from Jonas's brief and given to Masualle; Jonas thereafter served as MEC for Economic Development, Environmental Affairs and Tourism. He continued in that role until the next general election in May 2014.

== Deputy Minister of Finance: 2014–2017 ==
In the May 2014 general election, Jonas was elected to an ANC seat in the National Assembly, the lower house of the South African Parliament. He was elected fourth on the ANC's party list for the Eastern Cape constituency. On 25 May 2014, announcing his second-term cabinet, President Jacob Zuma appointed him as Deputy Minister of Finance. At first he deputised Finance Minister Nhlanhla Nene. However, in a controversial reshuffle on 9 December 2015, Nene was sacked and replaced by little-known backbencher Des van Rooyen. Days later van Rooyen was removed and replaced, in turn, by Pravin Gordhan.

=== Gupta allegations: 2016 ===
On 8 March 2016, the English Financial Times printed Jonas's allegation that the Gupta brothers had offered him the post of Minister of Finance shortly before van Rooyen was given the job, implying that the Guptas had significant influence over cabinet appointments. Jonas said that he had rejected the offer immediately because "it makes a mockery of our hard earned democracy". The Guptas denied the allegation, as did Zuma, who reminded Parliament that only he had the power to appoint ministers.

The story ignited a major controversy about the putative capture of the Zuma administration. In addition, politician Vytjie Mentor and public servant Themba Maseko both came forward with their own accusations about improper advances by the Guptas. Jonas was interviewed by the Public Protector, Thuli Madonsela, as part of her investigation into state capture, and Madonsela's report revealed additional details of his meeting with the Guptas, including that he had been offered a R600 million payout, in addition to the job of Finance Minister, and that Duduzane Zuma and Fana Hlongwane had both been present at the meeting.

=== Dismissal: 2017 ===
On 27 March 2017, Jonas and Gordhan were in London, England, launching an international investor roadshow, when Zuma's office ordered them to cancel their appearances and return to South Africa. In the early hours of 31 March, Zuma announced a major cabinet reshuffle in which both Jonas and Gordhan were sacked. They were replaced by Sfiso Buthelezi and Malusi Gigaba respectively.

Senior ANC leaders, including deputy president Cyril Ramaphosa and chief whip Jackson Mthembu, severely criticised the reshuffle, sparking dissent against Zuma in the party and leading the Daily Maverick to label Jonas and Gordhan "the faces of the resistance movement". Their dismissals were among the grievances voiced at the so-called #ZumaMustFall protests of early April 2017. Meanwhile, on 6 April, the ANC confirmed that Jonas had resigned his seat in Parliament in the aftermath of the reshuffle. His resignation took effect on 31 March, the day the reshuffle was announced. In May he said that the situation in South Africa had "gone beyond corruption. It is a real coup."

== Later career ==
=== Politics ===
Former deputy president Ramaphosa replaced Zuma as president in late February 2018, and his State of the Nation Address included a commitment to an ambitious investment drive. In April 2018, he announced that he had appointed Jonas and three others – Trevor Manuel, Phumzile Langeni, and Jacko Maree – as his special envoys on investment, tasked with helping to achieve the target of US$100 billion in new foreign investment over five years.

In August 2018, Jonas testified at the Zondo Commission, established under Justice Raymond Zondo to investigate the alleged capture of Zuma's administration. He gave a full account of his alleged meeting with Ajay Gupta in October 2015. Adding to his prior account, he alleged that Gupta had threatened to kill him. He appeared again at the Zondo Commission in March 2019 for cross-examination. The final report of the Zondo Commission concluded that Jonas had provided credible evidence of the Guptas' influence over Zuma.

In August 2019 Jonas launched his book, After Dawn: Hope after State Capture, which offers a political and economic programme for recovering from state capture in South Africa.

In April 2025 Jonas was appointed as a special envoy to the U.S. by South African president Cyril Ramaphosa as part of efforts to repair relations with the Trump administration following the expulsion of South African ambassador Ebrahim Rasool and other diplomatic disagreements. His suitability for the role has been questioned due to statements made during an interview by the SABC (South African Broadcasting Corporation), on 8 November 2020, when Jonas stated:

Right now, the U.S. is undergoing a watershed moment, with Biden the certain winner in the presidential race against the racist, homophobic Donald Trump... How we got to a situation where a narcissistic right-winger took charge of the world’s greatest economic and military powerhouse is something that we need to ponder over. It is something that all democracies need to ponder over.

— Mcebisi Jonas, South Africa’s new U.S. envoy called Trump racist, homophobic and narcissistic in 2020 speech, Los Angeles Times

The Trump administration declined issuing the necessary diplomatic visa for Jonas to visit the US.

=== Business ===
In June 2018 Mcebisi joined the MTN Group as an independent non-executive director, then became its non-executive chairperson in December 2019, succeeding Phuthuma Nhleko. He joined the board of Magda Wierzycka's Sygnia in September 2018 and the board of Northam Platinum in November 2018.

He heads Ntiso Investment Holdings, which is a leading partner in the consortium that became Apex Group's black economic empowerment partner in October 2023. After the deal was finalised, Jonas resigned from the board of Sygnia to avoid a conflict of interest.
