= Rosemary Capa =

South African politician

Rosemary Capa MP

Deputy Minister of Agriculture
- Incumbent
- Assumed office 30 June 2024
- President: Cyril Ramaphosa
- Minister: John Steenhuisen
- Preceded by: Office established

Deputy Minister of Agriculture, Rural Development and Land Reform
- In office 6 August 2021 – 19 June 2024
- President: Cyril Ramaphosa
- Preceded by: Sdumo Dlamini
- Succeeded by: Herself as Deputy Minister of Agriculture; Stanley Mathabatha as Deputy Minister of Land Reform and Rural Development

Deputy Minister of Small Business Development
- In office 30 May 2019 – 5 August 2021
- President: Cyril Ramaphosa
- Preceded by: Cassel Mathale
- Succeeded by: Sdumo Dlamini

Chairperson of the Portfolio Committee on Social Development
- In office 25 June 2014 – 7 May 2019
- Preceded by: Yolanda Botha
- Succeeded by: Mondli Gungubele

Member of the National Assembly of South Africa
- Incumbent
- Assumed office 21 May 2014

Personal details
- Born: 24 October 1952 (age 73)
- Party: African National Congress
- Spouse: Ndumiso Capa

Rosemary Nokuzola Capa (born 24 October 1952), also known as Zoleka Capa, is a South African politician who is currently serving as Deputy Minister of Agriculture since June 2024. She previously served as Deputy Minister of Agriculture, Rural Development and Land Reform since August 2021 to June 2024. She was Deputy Minister of Small Business Development from May 2019 to August 2021. A member of the African National Congress, she has been a Member of the National Assembly since May 2014. From June 2014 to May 2019, she was the chairperson of the Portfolio Committee on Social Development.

== Early life and career ==
Capa was born in Flagstaff in the Cape Province (now part of the Eastern Cape) during apartheid. She qualified as a nurse and midwife while a trainee at the Holy Cross Hospital in Flagstaff. After the end of apartheid, she spent two terms as the Executive Mayor of the OR Tambo District Municipality. In late 2010, she joined the Eastern Cape Provincial Legislature and was appointed to the Executive Council of the Eastern Cape as Member of the Executive Council (MEC) for Rural Development and Agrarian Reform.

== Career in national politics ==
=== Committee chairperson ===
Capa was elected to the National Assembly of South Africa following the general election on 8 May 2014. She was sworn into office on 21 May 2014. The ANC soon announced that Capa was their candidate for chairperson of the Portfolio Committee on Social Development. She was elected chairperson on 25 June 2014.

Capa served as chairperson of the portfolio committee until the dissolution of the term on 7 May 2019.

=== Deputy Minister ===
Following the general election of 8 May 2019, Capa returned to Parliament on 22 May 2019. On 29 May 2019, President Cyril Ramaphosa appointed her Deputy Minister of Small Business Development. Capa was sworn in the next day.

On 5 August 2021, she was appointed as Deputy Minister of Agriculture, Rural Development and Land Reform.

== Personal life ==
She is married to politician Ndumiso Capa. Their daughter Ntandokazi Capa is a Member of the Executive Council in the Eastern Cape.
