= Xolile Nqatha =

South African politician (born 1967)

Xolile Nqatha MPL

Eastern Cape MEC for Transport and Community Safety
- Incumbent
- Assumed office 16 August 2022
- Premier: Oscar Mabuyane
- Preceded by: Weziwe Tikana

Eastern Cape MEC for Cooperative Governance and Traditional Affairs
- In office 29 May 2019 – 16 August 2022
- Premier: Oscar Mabuyane
- Preceded by: Fikile Xasa
- Succeeded by: Zolile Williams

Eastern Cape MEC for Rural Development and Agrarian Reform
- In office 10 May 2018 – 29 May 2019
- Premier: Phumulo Masualle
- Preceded by: Mlibo Qoboshiyane
- Succeeded by: Nomakhosazana Meth

Member of the Eastern Cape Provincial Legislature
- Incumbent
- Assumed office 6 May 2009

Personal details
- Born: Xolile Edmund Nqatha; 16 February 1967 (age 59)
- Party: African National Congress
- Spouse: Lungelwa
- Children: 2
- Education: Mzoxolo High School
- Alma mater: Rhodes University; University of Fort Hare
- Profession: Politician

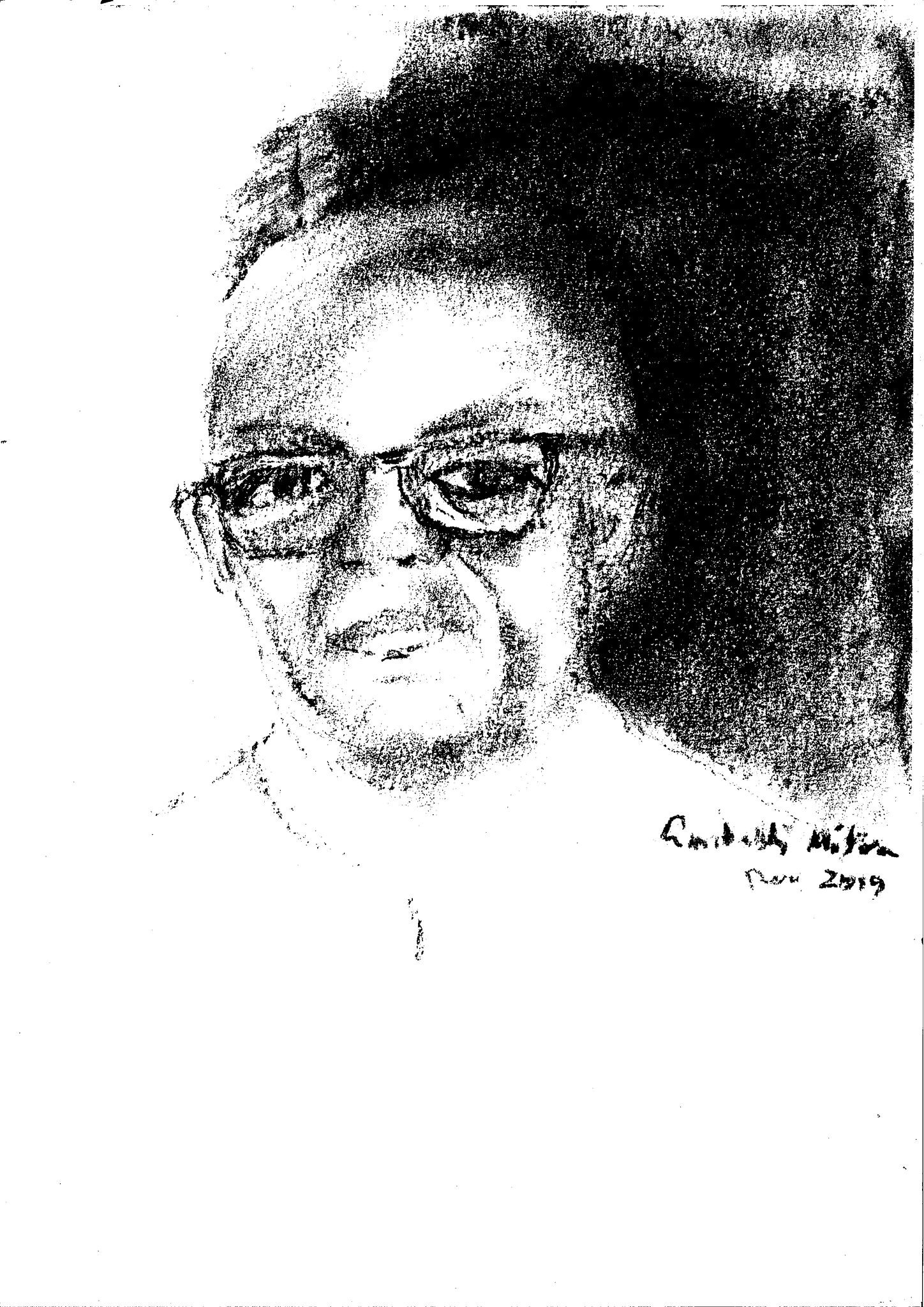
Xolile Nqatha, South African Politician, Charcoal on Paper by Amitabh Mitra

Xolile Edmund Nqatha (born 16 February 1967) is a South African politician who has been the Eastern Cape MEC for Transport and Community Safety since 2022. A member of the African National Congress, he has been a member of the Eastern Cape Provincial Legislature since 2009. Nqatha served as the MEC for Rural Development and Agrarian Reform from 2018 to 2019 and as the MEC for Cooperative Governance and Traditional Affairs from 2019 to 2022. He is also the provincial secretary of the South African Communist Party.

== Early life and education ==
Nqatha was born on 16 February 1967. He matriculated from Mzoxolo High School (now Jongile Nompondo High School) in Mlungisi. He earned a diploma in labour relations at Global Business Solution. At Rhodes University, he obtained a certificate in advanced human resources management, a certificate in project management course, a certificate in journalism training and an industrial relations certificate. Nqatha has a post-graduate diploma in Public Management from the University of Fort Hare and is currently studying for a Master of Public Administration (MPA) from the university.

== Early career ==
Nqatha worked as an underground mineworker and later as an assistant at Amatola Star Bakery from 1988 to 1989. He was employed as a researcher in the Department of Land Affairs for nine years and worked as a community development facilitator in the non-governmental sector for two years. Between August 2005 to September 2009, Nqatha worked as the provincial manager in the Eastern Cape office of the Dora Tamana Co-operative Centre, focusing on research, policy development and co-operative training.

== Political career ==
In 2009 Nqatha was elected to the Eastern Cape Provincial Legislature as a member of the ANC. During his time as an ordinary member of the provincial legislature, he served as the chair of the Transport, Cooperative Governances and Traditional Affairs, Finance and Provincial Expenditure portfolio committees and a member of Standing Committee on Public Accounts, Health, and Economic Development.

During the ANC's 8th provincial conference in 2017, Nqatha was elected to the ANC's provincial executive committee and the provincial working committee. He is also the provincial secretary of the South African Communist Party.

In May 2018, Nqatha was appointed as the Member of the Executive Council (MEC) for the Department of Rural Development and Agrarian Reform, succeeding Mlibo Qoboshiyane. After the May 8, 2019 elections he was appointed MEC for Cooperative Governance and Traditional Affairs.

In November 2020, Nqatha blamed factions at Eastern Cape municipal councils for protecting each other from unpropitious investigative findings in many reports compiled and endorsed by the provincial Cooperative Governance and Traditional Affairs department.

In January 2021, Nqatha dismissed Ntombizodwa Gamnca, the ANC ward councillor for ward 20 in the Buffalo City Metropolitan Municipality, as a municipal councillor. He said that she was found guilty of contravening the councillors' code of conduct as specified out in the Municipal Systems Act for her conviction for a criminal offence and her alleged involvement in a dubious house sale. On 18 February 2021, Nqatha was announced as the acting MEC for Health following Sindiswa Gomba's axing. He served until Nomakhosazana Meth's appointment in March.

Following the resignation of the MEC for Public Works, Babalo Madikizela, in July 2022, Nqatha was appointed to serve as the acting MEC for the portfolio until Mabuyane appointed a permanent replacement. On 16 August 2022, Nqatha was appointed as the MEC for Transport and Community Safety. He was reappointed as the MEC for this portfolio following his re-election in the 2024 provincial election.

== Personal life ==
Nqatha is married to Lungelwa and they have two sons.
