= Siphokazi Lusithi =

South African politician (born 1986)

Siphokazi Lusithi MPL

Eastern Cape MEC for Public Works and Human Settlements
- Incumbent
- Assumed office 21 June 2024
- Premier: Oscar Mabuyane
- Preceded by: Office established

Eastern Cape MEC for Human Settlements
- In office 16 August 2022 – 14 June 2024
- Premier: Oscar Mabuyane
- Preceded by: Nonceba Kontsiwe
- Succeeded by: Office abolished

Eastern Cape MEC for Social Development
- In office 29 May 2019 – 16 August 2022
- Premier: Oscar Mabuyane
- Preceded by: Pumza Dyantyi
- Succeeded by: Bukiwe Fanta

Member of the Eastern Cape Provincial Legislature
- Incumbent
- Assumed office 22 May 2019

Personal details
- Born: 19 July 1986 (age 40) Steynsburg, South Africa
- Party: African National Congress
- Spouse: Vuyo
- Children: 3
- Education: Lawson Brown High School
- Alma mater: University of Port Elizabeth; University of Fort Hare

Siphokazi Lusithi (née Mani; born 19 July 1986) is a South African politician, currently a member of the Eastern Cape Provincial Legislature for the African National Congress, and the current Member of the Executive Council (MEC) responsible for Public Works and Human Settlements in the Eastern Cape provincial government. Lusithi previously served as the MEC for the Social Development and Human Settlements portfolios.

== Early life and education ==
Lusithi was born on 19 July 1986 in Steynsburg in the former Cape Province. She matriculated from Lawson Brown High School in Port Elizabeth in 2003. She studied at the University of Port Elizabeth and the University of Fort Hare. She is currently studying for a Bachelor of Administration degree from the University of South Africa.

== Political career ==
Lusithi was involved in the African National Congress Youth League, the Young Communist League of South Africa, and student politics. She served as the provincial treasurer of the ANC youth league in the Eastern Cape and as the provincial chairperson of the South African Student Congress. She was also a member of the National Executive Committee (NEC) of the Young Communist League of South Africa.

Lusithi worked as a provincial manager on conferencing and electoral matters in the ANC provincial office. She was also a coordinator of an ANC PEC sub-committee. Prior to her election to the provincial legislature, Mani-Lusithi was an HR practitioner at the ANC Caucus Office at the provincial legislature.

In July 2023, Lusithi was elected provincial secretary of the African National Congress Women's League.

== Provincial government ==
Lusithi was elected to the Eastern Cape Provincial Legislature in the 2019 Eastern Cape provincial election. She was then appointed Member of the Executive Council (MEC) for Social Development by the newly elected premier, Oscar Mabuyane.

On 16 August 2022, Lusithi was appointed as the MEC for Human Settlements. Following the 2024 general election, the Department of Public Works and Infrastructure was merged with the Department of Human Settlements; Lusithi was appointed MEC for the newly established department.

== Personal life ==
Lusithi is married to Vuyo. The couple tested positive for COVID-19 in November 2020, during the COVID-19 pandemic in South Africa.
