= Nonceba Kontsiwe =

South African politician (born 1959)

Nonceba Kontsiwe MPL

Eastern Cape MEC for Rural Development and Agrarian Reform
- Incumbent
- Assumed office 21 June 2024
- Premier: Oscar Mabuyane
- Preceded by: Nonkqubela Pieters

Eastern Cape MEC for Sports, Recreation, Arts and Culture
- In office 16 August 2022 – 14 June 2024
- Premier: Oscar Mabuyane
- Preceded by: Fezeka Nkomonye-Bayeni
- Succeeded by: Sibulele Ngongo

Eastern Cape MEC for Human Settlements
- In office 9 March 2021 – 16 August 2022
- Premier: Oscar Mabuyane
- Preceded by: Nonkqubela Pieters
- Succeeded by: Siphokazi Mani-Lusithi

Personal details
- Born: 12 December 1959 (age 66)
- Party: African National Congress

Nonceba Kontsiwe (born 12 December 1959) is a South African politician and a veteran African National Congress (ANC) member of the Eastern Cape Provincial Legislature. On 9 March 2021, Kontsiwe was appointed as the Member of the Executive Council (MEC) responsible for Human Settlements by premier Oscar Mabuyane. During a cabinet reshuffle on 16 August 2022, Kontsiwe was appointed as the MEC for Sports, Recreation, Arts and Culture. She was appointed MEC for Rural Development and Agrarian Reform after the 2024 general election.

Kontsiwe was born in Ntabethemba. She was elected to the provincial legislature in 2014.

Political offices
Preceded by Nonkqubela Pieters	Eastern Cape MEC for Human Settlements; 2021 – 2022	Succeeded by Siphokazi Mani-Lusithi
