= Fundile Gade =

South African politician (born 1968)

Fundile Gade MPL

Eastern Cape MEC for Education
- Incumbent
- Assumed office 29 May 2019
- Premier: Oscar Mabuyane
- Preceded by: Mlungisi Mvoko

Member of the Eastern Cape Provincial Legislature
- Incumbent
- Assumed office 21 May 2014

Personal details
- Born: Fundile David Gade; 11 October 1968 (age 58) Idutywa, South Africa
- Party: African National Congress
- Children: 5
- Profession: Politician

Fundile David Gade (born 11 October 1968) is a South African educator and politician serving as the Eastern Cape MEC (Member of the Executive Council) for Education since May 2019. He has been a Member of the Eastern Cape Provincial Legislature for the African National Congress since May 2014. Gade had previously served as the chairperson of the legislature's Portfolio Committee on Education and as the chief whip of the ANC caucus.

== Biography ==
Gade hails from Dutywa. He worked as a teacher before becoming active in politics. He joined the Eastern Cape Provincial Legislature following the 2014 provincial election. Gade was first appointed the Chairperson of the Portfolio Committee on Education and then became the chief whip of the ANC caucus following a swap with incumbent Zolile Mrara in February 2018.

Gade was re-elected as an MPL in the May 8, 2019 election. He was sworn in for a second term as an MPL on 22 May 2019. On 28 May 2019, premier Oscar Mabuyane appointed him MEC for Education, succeeding Mlungisi Mvoko. He was inaugurated on 29 May. Gade was reappointed to the position by premier Mabuyane following the 2024 provincial election.

Gade is unmarried and has five children.
