= Babalo Madikizela =

South African politician

Eastern Cape MEC for Public Works
- In office 29 May 2019 – 29 July 2022
- Premier: Oscar Mabuyane
- Preceded by: Pemmy Majodina
- Succeeded by: Xolile Nqatha (acting); Ntombovuyo Nkopane

Eastern Cape MEC for Human Settlements
- In office 21 November 2018 – 29 May 2019
- Premier: Phumulo Masualle
- Preceded by: Mlungisi Mvoko
- Succeeded by: Nonkqubela Pieters

Member of the Eastern Cape Provincial Legislature
- In office 13 November 2018 – 2 August 2022

Personal details
- Born: Babalo Madikizela Mbizana, Cape Province, South Africa
- Party: African National Congress
- Education: ML Sultan Technikon
- Profession: Politician; Urban planner

Babalo Madikizela is a South African urban planner and politician who served as the Eastern Cape MEC for Public Works from May 2019 to July 2022 and as a Member of the Eastern Cape Provincial Legislature from November 2018 to August 2022. Madikizela served as the provincial treasurer of the African National Congress (ANC) from October 2017 to May 2022.

== Early life and education ==
Madikizela was born in village of Mbhongweni, Mbizana in the former Transkei, which became the northeastern part the Eastern Cape in 1994. He attended St. John's College from which he matriculated. He obtained a national diploma in town and regional planning from the ML Sultan Technikon, now the Durban University of Technology.

== Career ==
Madikizela started his career as a planner for the Municipal Mentoring Programme (MMP) and later found employment as a housing manager at the Ingquza Hill Local Municipality. He then worked for a fast-food restaurant in Mthatha and soon after started working in the construction industry.

Madikizela joined the African National Congress Youth League (ANCYL) at a young age. He served on the youth league's regional and provincial structures. He proceeded to serve on an ANC regional structure as an additional member and was later elected treasurer.

On 1 October 2017, Madikizela was elected provincial treasurer of the ANC. He was deployed to the provincial legislature in November 2018 and took office as an MPL on 13 November. On 18 November, premier Phumulo Masualle appointed Madikizela as MEC for Human Settlements. He assumed office on 21 November.

Following the May 2019 provincial election, premier Oscar Mabuyane appointed Madikizela as the Member of the Executive Council for Public Works. After his swearing-in, he availed himself for a lifestyle audit as he was accused of fraud and corruption by businessman Lonwabo Bam. Madikizela denied the allegations.

In May 2022, Madikizela challenged Oscar Mabuyane for provincial chairperson of the ANC in the Eastern Cape. He lost to Mabuyane, receiving 662 votes to Mabuyane's 812 votes. Zolile Williams replaced him as provincial treasurer. After his defeat, Madikizela announced that he would be resigning from the provincial government, and vacated his office on 29 July 2022. He said that he would remain a Member of the Provincial Legislature. Premier Mabuyane appointed Xolile Nqatha as the acting MEC for the portfolio until a permanent replacement had been appointed. Madikizela resigned from the Provincial Legislature on 2 August 2022. On 16 August, Ntombovuyo Nkopane became the new MEC for Public Works.
