= Nancy Sihlwayi =

South African politician

Member of the National Assembly of South Africa
- In office 22 May 2019 – 28 May 2024
- Constituency: National List

Personal details
- Born: Nomadewuka Nancy Sihlwayi
- Party: African National Congress
- Profession: Politician

Nomadewuka Nancy Sihlwayi is a South African politician, who was elected to the National Assembly of South Africa in the 2019 general elections as a member of the African National Congress. She had previously served as the Member of the Executive Council (MEC) responsible for the Department of Social Development in the Eastern Cape provincial government.

Sihlwayi served as a member of the Portfolio Committee on Human Settlements. She was previously a member of the Portfolio Committee on Human Settlements, Water and Sanitation.
