= Mbulelo Sogoni =

South African politician (born 1966)

Mbulelo Sogoni (born 16 January 1966) is a South African politician. A member of the African National Congress (ANC), Sogoni became the fourth Premier of the Eastern Cape on 25 July 2008 when he replaced Nosimo Balindlela until he was succeeded by Noxolo Kiviet on 6 May 2009 following 2009 election. Sogoni entered politics in the trade union movement during apartheid in South Africa and unsuccessfully lobbied for Thabo Mbeki to remain President of the ANC during the 2007 National Conference.

Political offices
Preceded by Nosimo Balindlela	Premier of the Eastern Cape; 1 August 2008 – 6 May 2009	Succeeded by Noxolo Kiviet
