= Thandiswa Marawu =

South African politician

Thandiswa Marawu MP

Member of Parliament from National List
- Incumbent
- Assumed office 2019

Personal details
- Party: ATM

Thandiswa Linnen Marawu is a South African politician from the African Transformation Movement. She is a member of the National Assembly of South Africa since 2019.

== See also ==
- List of National Assembly members of the 27th Parliament of South Africa
