= Helen Sauls-August =

Speaker of the Eastern Cape Provincial Legislature

The Honourable Helen Sauls-August MPL

Speaker of the Eastern Cape Provincial Legislature
- Incumbent
- Assumed office 22 May 2019
- Deputy: Mlibo Qoboshiyane
- Preceded by: Noxolo Kiviet

Personal details
- Born: Helen Mercedes Sauls-August
- Party: African National Congress
- Portfolio: Politician

Helen Mercedes Sauls-August is a South African politician and the current Speaker of the Eastern Cape Provincial Legislature. She was elected to the post in May 2019. She previously served as the provincial MEC for Human Settlement and the MEC for Health. She is a party member of the African National Congress. Sauls-August was also a councillor of the Nelson Mandela Metropolitan Municipality.

Political offices
Preceded by Noxolo Kiviet	Speaker of the Eastern Cape Provincial Legislature; 2019–present	Succeeded by Incumbent
