= Government of the Eastern Cape =

Provincial government of the Eastern Cape, South Africa

The Eastern Cape province of South Africa is governed in a parliamentary system in which the people elect the provincial legislature and the legislature, in turn, elects the Premier as head of the executive. The Premier leads an Executive Council consisting of members who oversee various executive departments. The structure of the provincial government is defined by chapter six of the Constitution of South Africa.

== Legislature ==
The Eastern Cape Provincial Legislature, situated in Bhisho, is the legislative branch of the provincial government. It is a unicameral legislature of 63 members, elected by a system of party-list proportional representation. An election is held every five years, conventionally at the same time as the election of the National Assembly.

After the election of 8 May 2019 there were forty-four members of the provincial legislature (MPLs) representing the African National Congress, ten representing the Democratic Alliance, five representing the Economic Freedom Fighters, two representing the United Democratic Movement, one representing the African Transformation Movement and one representing the Freedom Front Plus.

== Executive ==
The Premier of the Eastern Cape is the head of the provincial government. The premier is chosen by the members of the provincial parliament from amongst themselves. The Premier appoints Members of the Executive Council (MECs) to oversee the various departments of the provincial government. The Director-General is the non-political head of the provincial administration, while each department is led by a Head of Department. The current Premier is Oscar Mabuyane of the African National Congress. Besides the Premier, the Eastern Cape Executive Council consists of ten MECs overseeing twelve departments.

Portfolio	MEC
Premier	Oscar Mabuyane
Finance	Mlungisi Mvoko
Education	Fundile Gade
Health	Ntandokazi Capa
Cooperative Governance and Traditional Affairs	Zolile Williams
Economic Development, Environmental Affairs, and Tourism	Nonkqubela Pieters
Sport, Recreation, Arts and Culture	Sibulele Ngongo
Social Development	Bukiwe Fanta
Public Works and Human Settlements	Siphokazi Mani-Lusithi
Transport and Community Safety	Xolile Nqatha
Agriculture	Nonceba Kontsiwe

== Judiciary ==
South Africa has a single national judiciary; there is no separate system of provincial courts. The Eastern Cape Division of the High Court of South Africa has jurisdiction over all cases arising in the province, but generally handles only the most serious or high-profile criminal trials, high-value civil trials, cases involving judicial review of legislation or executive actions, and appeals from the magistrates' courts. The High Court has its main seat at Grahamstown and local seats at Bhisho, Mthatha and Port Elizabeth as well as a regular circuit court at East London. Appeals from the High Court are to the national Supreme Court of Appeal and ultimately (if a constitutional matter is involved) to the Constitutional Court.

The province is divided into magisterial districts, each of which is served by a district magistrate's court which has jurisdiction over all criminal cases except murder, rape and treason and can impose a fine of up to R100,000 or a prison sentence of up to three years, as well as jurisdiction over civil cases where the value of the claim is less than R100,000. The regional magistrate's court for the province, which sits at multiple locations, has jurisdiction over all criminal cases except treason and can impose a fine of up to R300,000 or a prison sentence of up to fifteen years (or life in some circumstances). The regional court also has jurisdiction over civil cases where the value of the claim is less than R300,000, and divorce and family law cases.

== Local government ==
The division of the Eastern Cape into municipalities

The Eastern Cape is divided into two metropolitan municipalities and six district municipalities which are subdivided into thirty-one local municipalities. The municipalities are listed below.

- Buffalo City Metropolitan Municipality
- Nelson Mandela Bay Metropolitan Municipality
- Alfred Nzo District Municipality: Matatiele Local Municipality, Mbizana Local Municipality, Ntabankulu Local Municipality, Umzimvubu Local Municipality
- Amathole District Municipality: Amahlathi Local Municipality, Great Kei Local Municipality, Mbhashe Local Municipality, Mnquma Local Municipality, Ngqushwa Local Municipality, Raymond Mhlaba Local Municipality
- Sarah Baartman District Municipality: Blue Crane Route Local Municipality, Dr Beyers Naudé Local Municipality, Kou-Kamma Local Municipality, Kouga Local Municipality, Makana Local Municipality, Ndlambe Local Municipality, Sundays River Valley Local Municipality
- Chris Hani District Municipality: Emalahleni Local Municipality, Engcobo Local Municipality, Enoch Mgijima Local Municipality, Intsika Yethu Local Municipality, Inxuba Yethemba Local Municipality, Sakhisizwe Local Municipality
- Joe Gqabi District Municipality: Elundini Local Municipality, Senqu Local Municipality, Walter Sisulu Local Municipality
- OR Tambo District Municipality: Ingquza Hill Local Municipality, King Sabata Dalindyebo Local Municipality, Kumkani Mhlontlo Local Municipality, Nyandeni Local Municipality, Port St Johns Local Municipality

== See also ==
- Government of South Africa
- Politics of the Eastern Cape
