= Phumulo Masualle =

South African politician (born 1965)

The Honourable Phumulo Masualle MP

Member of the National Assembly
- Incumbent
- Assumed office 22 May 2019

Deputy Minister of Public Enterprises
- In office 29 May 2019 – 6 March 2023
- President: Cyril Ramaphosa
- Minister: Pravin Gordhan
- Preceded by: Ben Martins
- Succeeded by: Obed Bapela

6th Premier of the Eastern Cape
- In office 21 May 2014 – 21 May 2019
- Preceded by: Noxolo Kiviet
- Succeeded by: Oscar Mabuyane

Provincial Chairperson of the Eastern Cape African National Congress
- In office September 2009 – March 2017
- Deputy: Gugile Nkwinti; Sakhumzi Somyo
- Preceded by: Stone Sizani
- Succeeded by: Oscar Mabuyane

National Treasurer of the South African Communist Party
- In office July 2007 – July 2012
- Chairperson: Gwede Mantashe
- General Secretary: Blade Nzimande
- Preceded by: Phillip Dexter
- Succeeded by: Joyce Moloi-Moropa

Personal details
- Born: Godfrey Phumulo Masualle; 12 December 1965 (age 60) Mount Fletcher, Cape Province; South Africa
- Party: African National Congress
- Other political affiliations: South African Communist Party

Godfrey Phumulo Masualle (born 12 December 1965) is a South African politician from the Eastern Cape who has represented the African National Congress (ANC) in the National Assembly since May 2019. He was Deputy Minister of Public Enterprises from May 2019 to March 2023, and before that he was the sixth Premier of the Eastern Cape from May 2014 to May 2019.

Born in Mount Fletcher, Masualle was a member of the Eastern Cape Provincial Legislature from 1999 to 2019. From 1999 to 2002, and later from 2008 to 2014, he held several different portfolios in the Eastern Cape Executive Council under Premiers Makhenkesi Stofile, Mbulelo Sogoni, and Noxolo Kiviet. During his first decade as a legislator, he rose to national prominence as a member of the left-wing coalition that supported Jacob Zuma's political rise; Masualle was the provincial chairperson of the South African Communist Party (SACP) in the Eastern Cape, and he served as the party's national treasurer from 2007 to 2012. He was elected to the ANC National Executive Committee for the first time in December 2007.

Between September 2009 and March 2017, Masualle was the provincial chairperson of the ANC's Eastern Cape branch. During this period, after the 2014 general election, he ascended to the Premier's office, where he served a single term. He was succeeded as provincial chairperson by Oscar Mabuyane at a hotly contested party conference, dubbed the "festival of chairs" for the violent brawl that broke out ahead of the vote.

Pursuant to the 2019 general election, he was sworn in to the National Assembly and appointed as a deputy minister by President Cyril Ramaphosa. Ahead of the ANC's 55th National Conference in December 2022, Masualle launched an unsuccessful campaign to be elected as ANC secretary-general, standing on a slate of candidates opposed to Ramaphosa's re-election. On 6 March 2023, Ramaphosa fired him as a deputy minister, relegating him to the backbenches of the National Assembly.

== Early life and education ==
Masualle was born on 12 December 1965 in Mount Fletcher in the former Cape Province. He grew up in Mount Frere and later in Mthatha, where he matriculated at St John's College. He has tertiary diplomas in electrical engineering and economic principles.

== Early political career ==
During the 1980s, Masualle became politically active through the students' wing of the anti-apartheid movement, particularly in the South African National Student Congress. He was later involved in the trade union movement through the Transkei Post Office Workers Association, a Transkei-based union. According to Masualle, his "political idol" was James Kati, an Umkhonto we Sizwe activist in the Transkei.

After the end of apartheid in 1994, he joined the public service in the provincial government of the Eastern Cape, where he served in various capacities until 1999. During the same period, he rose through the ranks of the African National Congress (ANC) and of the South African Communist Party (SACP), the ANC's partner in the Tripartite Alliance.

== Eastern Cape Provincial Legislature ==
=== MEC for Roads and Public Works: 1999–2002 ===
In the 1999 general election, Masualle was elected to an ANC seat in the Eastern Cape Provincial Legislature, where he served until 2019. In addition, Premier Makhenkesi Stofile appointed him to the Eastern Cape Executive Council as Member of the Executive Council (MEC) for Roads and Public Works.

During this period, Masualle's left-wing political orientation brought him some political heat. He was a senior leader of the SACP in the province, first as provincial secretary and later as provincial chairperson, during a time in which President Thabo Mbeki was highly wary of the left wing of the Tripartite Alliance. In July 2002, while Masualle was attending a regional ANC meeting in his capacity as a member of the ANC Provincial Executive Committee, party members in the Transkei objected to his presence, accusing him of "pushing a communist agenda within the ANC, and by this dividing the region".

In November 2002, the Mail & Guardian reported that the national ANC had ordered Premier Stofile to sack Masualle and another SACP member, Ncumisa Kondlo, from the provincial government. According to the newspaper, Masualle and Kondlo had been identified as "anti-Mbeki conspirators", members of a group of leftists within the party who were suspected of planning to challenge Mbeki at the ANC's upcoming elective conference. The Mail & Guardian also said that Masualle and Kondlo had refused to resign. On 25 November, Stofile addressed the provincial legislature in Bhisho and fiercely denied that he was going to effect the dismissals. However, three days later, on 28 November, he announced that Masualle and Kondlo had been sacked from the Executive Council.

=== Backbencher: 2002–2008 ===
After his dismissal from the Executive Council, Masualle served as an ordinary Member of the Provincial Legislature for six years, through the rest of Stofile's premiership and throughout the term of Stofile's successor, Premier Nosimo Balindlela. During this period, he served in several different committees in the provincial legislature, including the standing committee on public accounts. He also continued his rise through the ANC and SACP.

==== ANC leadership bids ====
At the Eastern Cape ANC's elective conference in April 2003, Masualle launched an abortive bid to succeed Stone Sizani as ANC deputy provincial chairperson. In a crowded field of contestants, he lost to Enoch Godongwana, who received 177 votes; Masualle received 125, while Mandisi Mpahlwa received 98 and Thobile Mhlahlo received 83.

At the next provincial elective conference, held at Fort Hare University in December 2006 and even more hotly contested, he pursued another unsuccessful campaign, this time standing to succeed the long-serving ANC provincial secretary, Humphrey Maxegwana. Because of the size and influence of the Eastern Cape party branch, the race attracted national attention; Masualle's candidacy was supported by Jacob Zuma and Zuma's left-wing supporters, who at the same time were preparing to challenge Mbeki for the national ANC presidency. He was also supported by the ANC's second-largest regional branch, the branch in the O. R. Tambo District. After Mbulelo Goniwe dropped out of the race, Masualle stood against Siphato Handi, who won the election. Indeed, Zuma's favoured candidates lost all the top leadership positions, with Stone Sizani defeating Mcebisi Jonas for the provincial chairmanship.

==== Election as SACP treasurer ====
By 2007, Masualle, then the provincial chairperson of the SACP's Eastern Cape branch, was viewed as a member of the "inner circle" of SACP national general secretary Blade Nzimande. At the party's 12th national congress, held in Port Elizabeth in July 2007, Masualle was elected to a five-year term as the SACP's national treasurer, succeeding Phillip Dexter. Although Mazibuko Jara had been expected to contest the election, Masualle was elected unopposed. One of his first tasks as treasurer was leading an internal investigation into Willie Madisha in connection with a missing donation to the party.

==== Polokwane conference ====
In December 2007, Masualle attended the ANC's 52nd National Conference in Polokwane, where Zuma was elected to succeed Mbeki as ANC president. At the conference, Masualle was elected to a five-year term as a member of the ANC National Executive Committee, with the backing of the Congress of South African Trade Unions (COSATU), the third wing of the Tripartite Alliance. Of the 80 ordinary members elected to the committee, he was the 69th-most popular, receiving 1,484 votes.

=== MEC for Economic Development: 2008–2009 ===
In July 2008, as Premier Balindlela became increasingly politically embattled, Masualle was touted – particularly by the SACP and COSATU – as a possible successor in her office as Premier of the Eastern Cape. However, one of Balindlela's provincial ministers, Mbulelo Sogoni, was elected instead. Masualle was returned to the Executive Council in Sogoni's former office as MEC for Economic Development, Environmental Affairs and Tourism, reportedly as part of a "compromise" between Zuma's camp and Sogoni's camp.

=== MEC for Health: 2009–2010 ===
In the run-up to the April 2009 general election, COSATU and the SACP again lobbied for Masualle to become the ANC's candidate for Premier of the Eastern Cape. However, Noxolo Kiviet was elected instead, and she retained Masualle in the Executive Council, now as MEC for Health. Masualle's transfer to the health portfolio was viewed as a demotion.

==== Election as ANC chairperson ====
Months after the election, in September 2009, Masualle was elected as ANC provincial chairperson at a party conference in East London. He had been viewed as an "underdog" in the contest, with Mcebisi Jonas – running on an anti-communist platform – the presumed frontrunner. However, the vote was apparently swayed by Masualle's decision to select Gugile Nkwinti, a minister and party chairperson in Cacadu, as his running mate. He was elected, with Nkwinti as his deputy and Oscar Mabuyane as provincial secretary.

In the aftermath of the conference, the SACP said that Masualle would likely ask Kiviet to reshuffle the government to ensure that key positions were aligned to the ANC's new leadership. Indeed, his election apparently "sparked anxiety among ANC moderates about the growing power of SACP members in the ruling party", causing tensions that spilled over to the national level after Billy Masetlha warned in the press that the SACP and COSATU should not attempt to impose their ideology on ANC administrations.

=== MEC for Provincial Planning and Finance: 2010–2014 ===
On 27 November 2010, Premier Kiviet announced a major cabinet reshuffle. Masualle was appointed to an approximation of the portfolio he had held in Sogoni's government, though the position was now renamed and restructured as MEC for Provincial Planning and Finance. He remained in this position until the 2014 general election, and during the same period, he was leader of government business in the provincial legislature.

Masualle's term as SACP treasurer expired in July 2012 and he did not accept nomination to stand for re-election, citing his obligations in the ANC. Joyce Moloi-Moropa was elected to succeed him as treasurer, while was elected as an ordinary member of the SACP Central Committee; by popularity, he was the second-ranked ordinary member, behind outgoing chairperson Gwede Mantashe. Masualle also did not stand for election to the ANC National Executive Committee at the party's 53rd National Conference in December 2012, because his provincial chairmanship qualified him as an ex officio member of the committee. He was re-elected unopposed to a second term as ANC provincial chairperson at the party's seventh provincial congress, held at Nelson Mandela University in June 2013; Sakhumzi Somyo was elected to succeed Nkwinti as his deputy.

=== Premier of the Eastern Cape: 2014–2019 ===
After the May 2014 general election, the ANC announced that it would nominate Masualle to succeed Kiviet as Eastern Cape Premier. He was sworn in on 21 May. In his maiden State of the Province Address in Bhisho in June, Masualle outlined seven strategic priorities for his administration, including "radical socioeconomic transformation", rural development, and food security. He said that he would pursue rapid industrialisation in the Eastern Cape, particularly through integration with the mining industry and by exploiting South Africa's diversification into nuclear power and shale gas. Infrastructural priorities included the completion of the Mthatha Airport terminal building by March 2015.

A major scandal of Masualle's tenure concerned the alleged misuse of public funds set aside for Nelson Mandela's funeral, held in 2013 while Masualle was finance MEC. R250,000 of the funeral funds had been deposited into Masualle's personal bank account. Masualle said that a department official had deposited the money into his account, and that he had instructed the department to reverse the transaction immediately upon learning of it. However, Athol Trollip of the opposition Democratic Alliance said that he would continue to press for investigations into Masualle's conduct.

==== Festival of chairs ====
Masualle stood for a third term as ANC provincial chairperson at the party's next elective conference in October 2017, but he was challenged by the outgoing provincial secretary, Oscar Mabuyane. When the provincial conference opened in October 2017, a plenary session devolved into violence in which several people were injured by flying chairs; the conference subsequently became popularly known as the "festival of chairs". After the brawl, only 55% of the delegates remained in the hall, most of them supporters of Mabuyane, and Masualle was not available to formally accept or decline his nomination in the election. Masualle thus received only seven votes, against Mabuyane's 931; Mabuyane won the chairmanship and his supporters took most of the seats on the Provincial Executive Committee.

In subsequent months, Masualle's supporters disputed the election result, but the ANC National Executive Committee rejected a recommendation – the outcome of an internal inquiry by S'bu Ndebele – to re-run the election. Instead, the party opted for a "political solution" that would build "unity" in the provincial party. In June 2018, the Johannesburg High Court dismissed an attempt by Masualle's supporters to have the election outcomes declared invalid.

==== Nasrec conference ====
Despite his defeat in the provincial ANC, and despite reports that Zuma supporters were likely to lose popularity in the SACP, Masualle was re-elected to the SACP Central Committee in July 2017. In December 2017, at the ANC's 54th National Conference at Nasrec, Masualle was viewed as a backer of losing presidential candidate Nkosazana Dlamini-Zuma, though the Mail & Guardian said that he was also "comfortable" with Zweli Mkhize's presidential bid. Masualle later said that he did not see himself aligned to any single leader, arguing, "I really exercise my own mind to what I see, take a view and when I've taken that view, I really go for it".

He was considered to be a possible candidate to stand for the deputy secretary-general position on Dlamini-Zuma's slate. Instead, he was re-elected as an ordinary member of the National Executive Committee, ranked 54th by popularity. He was appointed to chair the subcommittee on legislature and governance.

==== Succession ====
In the aftermath of Masualle's exit from the ANC provincial chairmanship, he came under increasing pressure from the newly elected party leadership, which mounted after Masualle's 2018 State of the Province Address. In the aftermath of the speech, the Mabuyane-led Provincial Executive Committee apparently approached the National Executive Committee with a recommendation to remove Masualle as Premier and replace him with Mabuyane. Zuma's supporters argued that this campaign was one example of a broader purge being pursued by supporters of newly elected President Cyril Ramaphosa. Masualle told City Press that he was prepared to step down, but only on the instructions of the national party, not the provincial party. In the same interview, he expressed pride in his administration's economic, infrastructural, and agricultural accomplishments; asked to grade his performance out of 10, he said he would give himself "Anything above seven".

Although its recommendation to remove Masualle was rejected, the Provincial Executive Committee continued to press for changes in Masualle's Executive Council – in particular for the dismissal of Sakhumzi Somyo, Mlibo Qoboshiyane, Thandiswa Marawu, and Nancy Sihlwayi – and threatened to pass a motion of no confidence of Masualle in the legislature if he did not comply. In May 2018, following a meeting at Luthuli House between Masualle, the provincial party, and ANC secretary-general Ace Magashule, Masualle reportedly agreed to effect the reshuffle in exchange for being allowed to complete his term as Premier. He announced the reshuffle later the same week, with a spokesperson saying that the changes followed from the "new political discourse" in the province and would allow "for a smooth transition" ahead of the May 2019 general election.

Masualle subsequently began to prepare for the expiry of his term in the Premier's office. After delivering his final State of the Province Address in February 2019, he said that his premiership was "an experience I will cherish all my life"; he also said that he was not certain what he would do next. Pursuant to the 2019 election, Mabuyane succeeded him as Premier.

== National Assembly ==
=== Deputy Minister of Public Enterprises: 2019–2023 ===
In the 2019 election, Masualle did not stand for what would have been his fifth consecutive term in the Eastern Cape Provincial Legislature; instead, he was elected to an ANC seat in the National Assembly, the lower house of the South African Parliament. He was ranked 39th on the ANC's national party list. After the election, he was appointed as Deputy Minister of Public Enterprises, serving under Minister Pravin Gordhan in Ramaphosa's second cabinet.

==== Nasrec II conference ====
Masualle was not re-elected to the SACP Central Committee when his term expired in July 2019. However, he served the rest of his term on the ANC National Executive Committee, and, as the party's 55th National Conference approached in 2022, he was increasingly touted as a candidate for election as ANC secretary-general. His main competitors were Fikile Mbalula and Mdumiseni Ntuli. The Mabuyane-led Provincial Executive Committee in Masualle's home province controversially endorsed Ntuli's candidacy, but Masualle said that he was unconcerned and expected a groundswell of support from local party branches in the Eastern Cape.

In addition to appealing to "his former allies on the left", Masualle was expected to boost his campaign by leveraging opposition to Ramaphosa's re-election bid. Indeed, he was openly critical of Ramaphosa during his campaign, saying, among other things, that the step-aside rule had been used "to settle scores". The Mail & Guardian viewed him as a representative of the so-called radical economic transformation (RET) faction. His opposition to Ramaphosa's re-election led him into alignment with Zweli Mkhize, the main presidential challenger. When Masualle was endorsed by the Provincial Executive Committee of Mkhize's province, KwaZulu-Natal, Mabuyane accused the KwaZulu-Natal ANC of attempting to divide its Eastern Cape counterpart.

The Mail & Guardian expected Mbalula and Ntuli to split the pro-Ramaphosa vote, but Mbalula nonetheless won narrowly in December 2022, receiving 1,692 votes against Masualle's 1,590 and Ntuli's 1,080. Masualle was re-elected as an ordinary member of the National Executive Committee, ranked 30th by popularity.

=== Backbencher: 2023–present ===
On 6 March 2023, Ramaphosa announced a cabinet reshuffle, firing Masualle from the Ministry of Public Enterprises and replacing him with Obed Bapela. He remained in the National Assembly as an ordinary Member of Parliament and was appointed as a member of the Standing Committee on Finance.

== Personal life ==
Masualle married Fuzi Masualle in 1996;having two sons before; they then had one child of their own, born in 2017. They had been estranged since 2018. The Sowetan reported that Masualle was accompanied to the 2019 State of the Nation Address by a new girlfriend, a businesswoman from Mount Fletcher.

Political offices
Preceded by Noxolo Kiviet	Premier of the Eastern Cape; 21 May 2014 – 22 May 2019	Succeeded by Oscar Mabuyane
