= Noxolo Kiviet =

South African politician (born 1963)

The Honourable Noxolo Kiviet MP
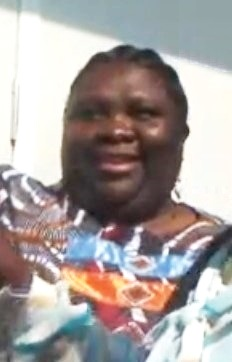

Minister of Public Service and Administration
- In office 7 March 2023 – 17 June 2024
- President: Cyril Ramaphosa
- Deputy: Chana Pilane-Majake
- Preceded by: Thulas Nxesi (acting); Ayanda Dlodlo
- Succeeded by: Mzamo Buthelezi

Member of the National Assembly
- In office 22 May 2019 – 28 May 2024

Deputy Minister of Public Works and Infrastructure
- In office 30 May 2019 – 6 March 2023
- President: Cyril Ramaphosa
- Minister: Patricia de Lille
- Preceded by: Jeremy Cronin (for Public Works)
- Succeeded by: Bernice Swarts

5th Premier of the Eastern Cape
- In office 6 May 2009 – 21 May 2014
- Preceded by: Mbulelo Sogoni
- Succeeded by: Phumulo Masualle

Speaker of the Eastern Cape Provincial Legislature
- In office 21 May 2014 – 7 May 2019
- Preceded by: Fikile Xasa
- Succeeded by: Helen Sauls-August
- In office 2004–2009
- Preceded by: Mkhangeli Matomela
- Succeeded by: Fikile Xasa

Personal details
- Born: 21 July 1963 (age 62) Mdantsane, Cape Province; South Africa
- Party: African National Congress
- Education: Khulani Commercial High School
- Alma mater: University of Fort Hare

Noxolo Kiviet (born 21 July 1963) is a South African politician who served as the Minister of Public Service and Administration from 2023 to 2024. She was formerly the Deputy Minister of Public Works and Infrastructure from 2019 to 2023 and also served as the Premier of the Eastern Cape from 2009 to 2014.

Kiviet is a member of the African National Congress (ANC) and a former trade unionist. Both before and after her term as premier, she served as Speaker of the Eastern Cape Provincial Legislature from 2004 to 2009 and from 2014 to 2019. Pursuant to the 2019 general election, she became a Member of the National Assembly of South Africa and was appointed to the national executive by President Cyril Ramaphosa. She has also served on the National Executive Committee of the ANC since 2017.

== Early life and career ==
Kiviet was born on 21 July 1963 in Mdantsane in the former Cape Province. She rose to political prominence through the apartheid-era trade union movement in South Africa: she rose through the ranks of the Chemical Workers' Industrial Union as Eastern Cape treasurer from 1991 to 1993 and national deputy chairperson from 1993 to 1997. From 1993 to 1994, she was also treasurer of the Border Kei regional branch of the ANC-aligned Congress of South African Trade Unions.

== Political career ==
=== Provincial legislature: 1994–2019 ===
Kiviet became a member of the legislature in the 1994 general election. She also served as provincial treasurer of the ANC's Eastern Cape branch from 1996 to 2003, serving under ANC provincial chairperson Makhenkesi Stofile. Pursuant to the 2004 general election, she was elected as Speaker of the Eastern Cape Provincial Legislature. She held that position until the conclusion of the legislative term in the 2009 general election, after which she was elected to succeed Mbulelo Sogoni as Premier of the Eastern Cape.

Kiviet took office as premier on 6 May 2009, becoming the fifth person and the second woman to hold the job. According to the Mail & Guardian, her election was unexpected, with Mbulelo Sogoni and Mcebisi Jonas having been viewed as the frontrunners for the position. In June 2012, she was rated as the worst-performing provincial premier by the South African Public Service Commission.

In the next general election in 2014, Kiviet was re-elected to the Eastern Cape Provincial Legislature, ranked 23rd on the ANC's party list, but she was succeeded as premier by Phumulo Masualle and instead was elected to a second term as Speaker. While she was in that position, in December 2017, the ANC's 54th National Conference elected Kiviet to a five-year term as a member of the party's National Executive Committee; by number of votes received, she was ranked 54th of the 80 ordinary members elected.

=== National legislature: 2019–2024 ===
In the 2019 general election, Kiviet did not seek re-election to the provincial legislature but was instead elected as a Member of the National Assembly, the lower house of South Africa's national Parliament; she was ranked 42nd on the ANC's national party list. After the election, President Cyril Ramaphosa appointed her Deputy Minister of Public Works and Infrastructure. She took office on 30 May 2019 and deputised Minister Patricia de Lille. In December 2022, at the ANC's 55th National Conference, she was re-elected to the National Executive Committee, ranked 43rd by number of votes received.

On 6 March 2023, Ramaphosa announced a cabinet reshuffle in which Kiviet was promoted to Minister of Public Service and Administration. That post which had been filled by Thulas Nxesi in an acting capacity since Ayanda Dlodlo's resignation in 2022.

Kiviet lost her seat in the National Assembly during the 2024 general election as the ANC lost 71 seats and its parliamentary majority.

== Education ==
Kiviet is an alumna of the University of Fort Hare in the Eastern Cape. According to one of her public profiles, she received a Bachelor of Administration, an Honours degree in 2008, and a Master of Public Administration in 2010. However, in March 2023, shortly after Kiviet's appointment as a minister, News24 reported that the University of Fort Hare alleged that Kiviet had not completed a Bachelor of Administration, nor any other undergraduate degree. On these grounds, the university alleged that Kiviet had enrolled in her two postgraduate degrees – the Honours and Master's degrees – fraudulently. Kiviet denied this allegation, but Ramaphosa authorised the Special Investigating Unit to investigate a possible "degree-conferring scam" at the University of Fort Hare.

Political offices
Preceded by Mbulelo Sogoni	Premier of the Eastern Cape; 6 May 2009 – 21 May 2014	Succeeded by Phumulo Masualle
