= South African Students Congress =

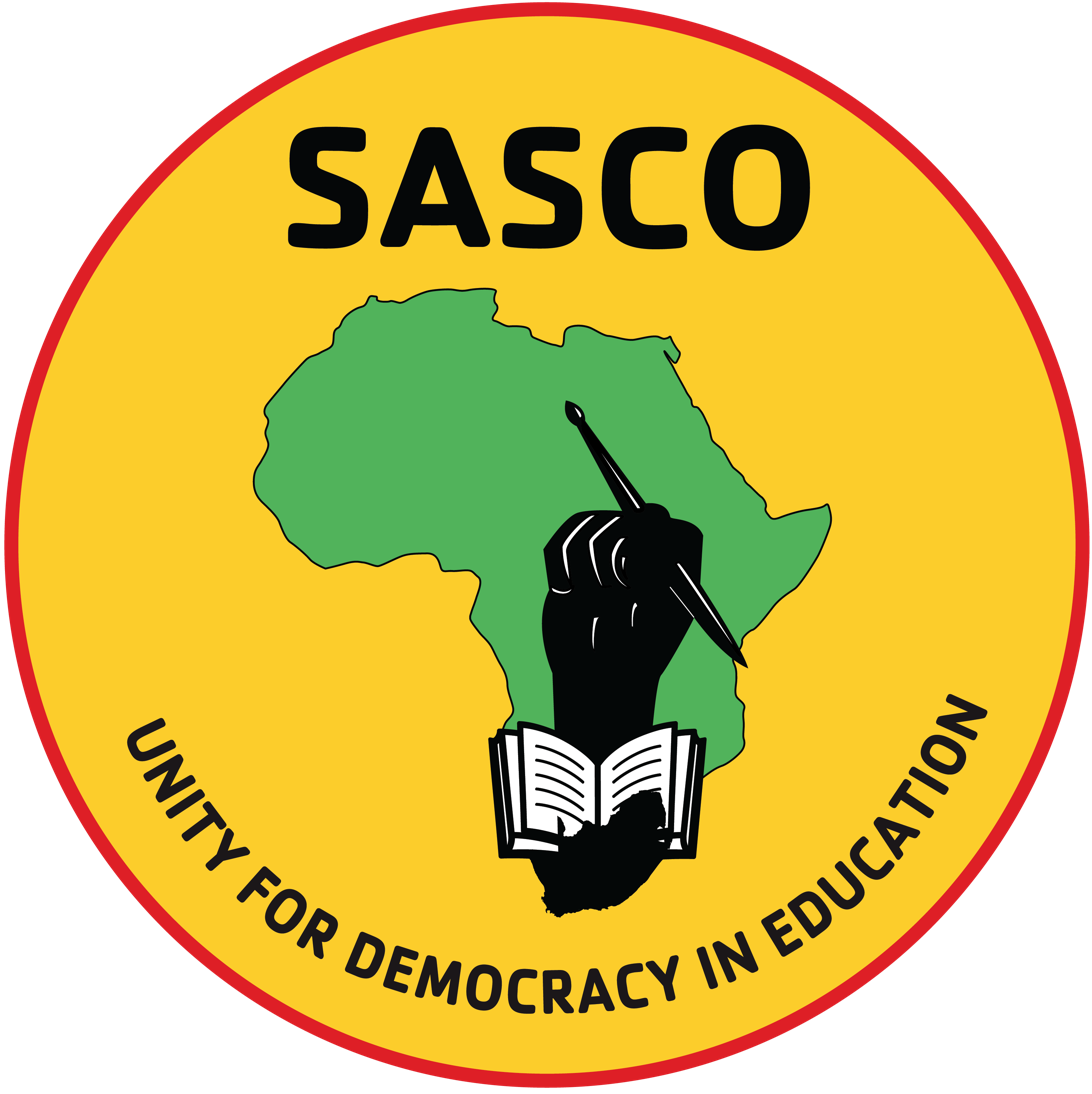
- President: Alungile Kamtshe
- Secretary-General: Admission Monareng
- Founded: September 1991
- Preceded by: Azanian Students Organisation
- Headquarters: Luthuli House
- Ideology: Socialism
- Colours: Black, Green, Gold, Red(optional)

The South African Students Congress (SASCO) is a South African student organisation currently led by Alungile Kamtshe as the organization's president. SASCO was founded in September 1991 at Rhodes University in Grahamstown, Eastern Cape, through the merger of the South African National Student Congress (SANSCO) and the National Union of South African Students (NUSAS). The predecessor of SANSCO, the Azanian Students Organisation (AZASO) was initially formed in 1979 as a continuation of the South African Students' Organisation (SASO) when the latter was banned by the Apartheid government. SASO, in turn, got started by Steve Biko as a breakaway faction from NUSAS in the 1960's.

SASCO is a member of the All-Africa Students Union.
