= Oscar Mabuyane =

South African politician

The Honourable Oscar Mabuyane MPL

7th Premier of the Eastern Cape
- Incumbent
- Assumed office 22 May 2019
- Preceded by: Phumulo Masualle

Member of the Eastern Cape Provincial Legislature
- Incumbent
- Assumed office 19 February 2018

Provincial Chairperson of the African National Congress in the Eastern Cape
- Incumbent
- Assumed office 1 October 2017
- Deputy: Mlungisi Mvoko
- Preceded by: Phumulo Masualle

Personal details
- Born: 24 February 1974 (age 52) Engcobo, Cape Province; South Africa
- Party: African National Congress
- Spouse: Siyasanga
- Children: 3
- Education: University of Fort Hare
- Occupation: Politician

Lubabalo Oscar Mabuyane (born 24 February 1974) is a South African politician who has been serving as the seventh Premier of the Eastern Cape since May 2019. He was previously Member of the Executive Council (MEC) for Economic Development, Environmental Affairs and Tourism in the Eastern Cape provincial government from May 2018 to May 2019.

Formerly a businessman and aide to politician Enoch Godongwana, Mabuyane rose to political prominence through the African National Congress (ANC) and ANC Youth League in the Eastern Cape. He was elected ANC Provincial Secretary in 2009 and ANC Provincial Chairperson in 2017 before his ascension to the Eastern Cape Provincial Legislature in February 2018. In May 2022, he was elected to a second term as Provincial Chairperson of the Eastern Cape ANC.

== Early life and education ==
Lubabalo Oscar Mabuyane was born on 24 February 1974 in Ngcobo in the former Cape Province. His family is from the Xhosa-speaking Thembu tribe. He attended Zilimbola Junior Secondary School in the Cape, but as a teenager he left his family home to live with his father in Carletonville in the Transvaal so that he could earn money in nearby Johannesburg. He matriculated in 1995 at Lekoa Shandu High School in Sharpeville, Transvaal. In 1997, he enrolled at the University of Fort Hare in the newly constituted Eastern Cape Province; he received a Bachelor's degree in economics.

While at Fort Hare, Mabuyane was involved in student politics: he was chairperson of a local branch of the South African Students Congress in 1999 and was elected president of the Fort Hare student representative council in 2000. He was also a member of the African National Congress (ANC) Youth League.

Mabuyane later studied for a Master's degree in public administration, also from the University of Fort Hare, but he was deregistered as a student in 2021; the university claimed that admission procedures had not been followed correctly upon his enrolment.

== Political career ==
Between 2002 and 2005, Mabuyane worked in Bhisho, Eastern Cape as chief of staff in the office of ANC politician Enoch Godongwana, who was then the Member of the Executive Council (MEC) for Tourism, Economic Affairs and Finance in the Eastern Cape provincial government. From 2005 to 2009, he was managing director of Ikamva Consulting, a consultancy firm.

=== Rise in the ANC ===
Over the same period, Mabuyane remained active in the ANC. In 2008, he was elected deputy provincial secretary of the ANC Youth League's Eastern Cape branch, a position he held until 2011. In September 2009, he was additionally elected provincial secretary of the mainstream ANC, a full-time position in a leadership corps headed by Phumulo Masualle; he beat Xola Phakathi, a leader in the Eastern Cape branch of the Congress of South African Trade Unions, to gain election. He was re-elected ANC provincial secretary in July 2013.

==== Festival of chairs ====
Ahead of the provincial party's next elective conference in 2017, Mabuyane launched a campaign to oust Masualle, who intended to run for a third term as ANC provincial chairperson. One of the several issues of contention between their camps was leadership succession in the national ANC ahead of the ANC's 54th National Conference: Mabuyane had publicly supported deputy president Cyril Ramaphosa's bid to succeed incumbent ANC president Jacob Zuma, while Masualle was more ambivalent. When the provincial conference opened in October 2017, a plenary session devolved into violence in which several people were injured by flying chairs; the conference subsequently became popularly known as the "festival of chairs", a phrase that was first coined by Ramaphosa and was a reference to the ANC's promise to offer a "festival of ideas". After the brawl, only 55% of the delegates remained in the hall, most of them supporters of Mabuyane, and Masualle was not available to formally accept or decline his nomination in the election. Mabuyane thus won in a landslide, receiving 931 votes against Masualle's seven, and he was appointed ANC provincial chairperson for the Eastern Cape. The provincial executive committee elected at the conference was dominated by Mabuyane's supporters.

In subsequent months, Masualle's supporters disputed the election result and the ANC National Executive Committee (NEC) appointed one of its members, S'bu Ndebele, to investigate. Ndebele recommended that the Mabuyane-led provincial executive committee should be dissolved and replaced in fresh elections, but the NEC rejected his recommendation, opting instead for a "political solution" that would build "unity" in the provincial party. In June 2018, the Johannesburg High Court dismissed an attempt by Masualle's supporters to have the NEC ordered to dissolve the provincial executive.

==== Re-election ====
As provincial chairperson, Mabuyane became an ex officio member of the NEC. He remained a strong supporter of Ramaphosa, who had succeeded in his 2017 bid for election as ANC president. On 9 May 2022, during another volatile conference, Mabuyane was re-elected to a second term as provincial chairperson, defeating a challenge from Babalo Madikizela, the incumbent provincial treasurer, with 812 votes to Madikizela's 662. The other top positions in the provincial executive committee went to people who had run on Mabuyane's slate, with all the incumbent officials except Madikizela re-elected to their posts.

==== Deputy presidency bid ====
Later that year, Mabuyane emerged as a candidate for election to a top national leadership position at the ANC's 55th National Conference in December. In September, his provincial executive committee endorsed him for the ANC deputy presidency. He was nominated for the deputy president position by 397 local ANC branches, 390 of them in the Eastern Cape, and ran against Paul Mashatile and Ronald Lamola.

=== Provincial government ===
On 19 February 2018, less than six months after his election as ANC provincial chairperson, Mabuyane was sworn in as a Member of the Eastern Cape Provincial Legislature, leading to speculation that a reshuffle in the provincial executive was imminent. In May, Masualle, as Premier of the Eastern Cape, appointed Mabuyane MEC for Economic Development, Environmental Affairs and Tourism, in which portfolio he succeeded Sakhumzi Somyo. Masualle said that he was appointing Mabuyane and other newly elected provincial leaders to his Executive Council in order to prepare for "a smooth transition" into a new administration after the 2019 general election.

In the May 2019 election in the Eastern Cape, the ANC retained its large majority in the province and the ANC NEC announced that Mabuyane was the party's candidate to succeed Masualle as premier. Mabuyane was elected Premier by the provincial legislature and assumed office on 22 May 2019. He was re-elected as premier following the May 2024 provincial election.

== Controversy ==
In October 2021, Mabuyane was implicated in an investigation by the Public Protector, Busisiwe Mkhwebane, into the alleged misuse of public funds by the Eastern Cape provincial government and the local municipality of Mbizana, Eastern Cape. In 2018, the government had set aside R3.3 million to host events commemorating Winnie Madikizela-Mandela, a recently deceased ANC stalwart from Mbizana. The Public Protector's investigation found that a portion of the money, R450,000, had been used to renovate the private residence of Mabuyane, who at the time was an MEC. The Public Protector referred her findings to the Hawks for criminal investigation, suggesting that Mabuyane and other officials had "improperly benefitted from the misuse of public funds" and may have contravened the Prevention of Organised Crime Act or Prevention and Combating of Corrupt Activities Act. Mabuyane denied the allegation of misconduct and suggested that the criminal investigation was unconstitutional and had been influenced by suspended ANC secretary general Ace Magashule, a prominent opponent of Ramaphosa. As of March 2022, the investigation was ongoing.

== Personal life ==
Mabuyane is married to Siyasanga. They have three children.

On 12 November 2020, his office announced that he had tested positive for COVID-19.
