= Eastern Cape (National Assembly of South Africa constituency) =

- iMpuma-Kapa
- Constituency for the National Assembly of South Africa
- Location of Eastern Cape within South Africa
- Province: Eastern Cape
- Population: 6,734,001 (2020)
- Electorate: 3,363,161 (2019)

Current constituency
- Created: 1994
- Seats: List: 25 (2019–present); 26 (2009–2019); 28 (2004–2009); 27 (–2004)
- Members of the National Assembly: List: Phoebe Noxolo Abraham (ANC); Zolile Burns-Ncamashe (ANC); Ndumiso Capa (ANC); Beauty Dlulane (ANC); Princess Faku (ANC); Cedric Frolick (ANC); Mandla Galo (ANC); Nqabisa Gantsho (ANC); Samantha Graham (DA); Patekile Holomisa (ANC); Chantel King (DA); Noxolo Kiviet (ANC); Nqabayomzi Kwankwa (UDM); Pemmy Majodina (ANC); Phumulo Masualle (ANC); Nthako Matiase (EFF); Thandeka Mbabama (DA); Veronica Mente (EFF); Zola Mlenzana (ANC); Gcinikhaya Mpumza (ANC); Phumeza Mpushe (ANC); Nonkosi Mvana (ANC); Dingaan Myolwa (ANC); Stella Ndabeni-Abrahams (ANC); Sakhumzi Somyo (ANC); Annette Steyn (DA); Nokuzola Tolashe (ANC); Busisiwe Tshwete (ANC); Pam Tshwete (ANC); Fikile Xasa (ANC); Sheilla Xego (ANC)

Eastern Cape (Xhosa: iMpuma-Kapa) is one of the nine multi-member constituencies of the National Assembly of South Africa, the lower house of the Parliament of South Africa, the national legislature of South Africa. The constituency was established in 1994 when the National Assembly was established by the Interim Constitution following the end of Apartheid. It is conterminous with the province of Eastern Cape. The constituency currently elects 25 of the 400 members of the National Assembly using the closed party-list proportional representation electoral system. At the 2019 general election it had 3,363,161 registered electors.

== Electoral system ==
Eastern Cape currently elects 25 of the 400 members of the National Assembly using the closed party-list proportional representation electoral system. Constituency seats are allocated using the largest remainder method with a Droop quota.

== Election results ==
=== Summary ===
Election	Pan Africanist Congress PAC			United Democratic Movement UDM			African National Congress ANC			Democratic Alliance DA/DP			New National Party NNP/NP			African Christian Democratic Party ACDP			Inkatha Freedom Party IFP			Economic Freedom Fighters EFF			Freedom Front Plus VF+/VFFF/VV-FF		
Election	Votes	%	Seats	Votes	%	Seats	Votes	%	Seats	Votes	%	Seats	Votes	%	Seats	Votes	%	Seats	Votes	%	Seats	Votes	%	Seats	Votes	%	Seats
2024	9,496	0.53%	0	63,606	3.55%	1	1,118,028	62.38%	16	266,919	14.89%	4				8,529	0.48%	0	1,519	0.08%	0	182,809	10.20%	3	9,288	0.52%	0
2019	7,844	0.39%	0	46,258	2.29%	1	1,399,455	69.26%	18	303,309	15.01%	4				9,947	0.49%	0	1,021	0.05%	0	155,899	7.72%	2	17,699	0.88%	0
2014	9,649	0.43%	0	118,645	5.29%	2	1,587,338	70.75%	19	356,050	15.87%	4				8,016	0.36%	0	1,291	0.06%	0	84,783	3.78%	1	8,771	0.39%	0
2009	11,925	0.52%	0	91,227	3.95%	1	1,609,926	69.70%	19	230,187	9.97%	3				13,750	0.60%	0	2,080	0.09%	0				5,490	0.24%	0
2004	22,314	0.98%	0	202,964	8.91%	3	1,806,221	79.31%	23	165,135	7.25%	2	14,421	0.63%	0	17,682	0.78%	0	4,712	0.21%	0				6,488	0.28%	0
1999	21,978	1.00%	0	281,748	12.88%	3	1,617,329	73.91%	21	139,520	6.38%	2	72,639	3.32%	1	24,344	1.11%	0	6,511	0.30%	0				6,822	0.31%	0
1994	56,891	1.99%					2,411,695	84.39%		35,435	1.24%		302,951	10.60%		10,879	0.38%		6,798	0.24%					18,656	0.65%	

=== 2024 ===
Results of the regional ballot for the Eastern Cape in the 2024 general election held on 29 May 2024:

Party/Candidate	Votes	%	Seats	+/–
African National Congress	1,118,028	62.38	16	–2
Democratic Alliance	266,919	14.89	4	0
Economic Freedom Fighters	182,809	10.20	3	+1
United Democratic Movement	63,606	3.55	1	0
Patriotic Alliance	42,393	2.37	1	+1
African Transformation Movement	28,115	1.57	0	0
uMkhonto weSizwe	26,246	1.46	0	New
Pan Africanist Congress of Azania	9,496	0.53	0	0
Freedom Front Plus	9,288	0.52	0	0
ActionSA	8,588	0.48	0	New
African Christian Democratic Party	8,529	0.48	0	0
Rise Mzansi	5,384	0.30	0	New
Build One South Africa	4,852	0.27	0	New
Azanian People's Organisation	2,807	0.16	0	0
Congress of the People	2,184	0.12	0	0
Alliance of Citizens for Change	1,964	0.11	0	New
African People's Convention	1,906	0.11	0	0
Good	1,621	0.09	0	0
Inkatha Freedom Party	1,519	0.08	0	0
Al Jama-ah	1,458	0.08	0	0
United Independent Movement	1,333	0.07	0	New
Organic Humanity Movement	570	0.03	0	New
Citizans	449	0.03	0	New
Sizwe Ummah Nation	344	0.02	0	New
Africa Restoration Alliance	321	0.02	0	New
South African Rainbow Alliance	310	0.02	0	New
Free Democrats	299	0.02	0	0
Economic Liberators Forum South Africa	298	0.02	0	New
People's Movement for Change	283	0.02	0	New
Africa Africans Reclaim	233	0.01	0	New
Total	1,792,152	100.00	25	–
Valid votes	1,792,152	98.87		
Invalid/blank votes	20,442	1.13		
Total votes	1,812,594	100.00		
Registered voters/turnout	3,438,924	52.71		

The following candidates were elected.

Name	Party
Zolile Burns-Ncamashe	ANC
Mluleki Dlelanga	ANC
Mary-Ann Dunjwa	ANC
Cedric Frolick	ANC
Nqabisa Gantsho	ANC
Renaldo Gouws	DA
Mzimasi Hala	ANC
Gavin Jonas	PA
Andisiwe Kumbaca	ANC
Babalwa Mathulelwa	EFF
Kevin Mileham	DA
Mzoleli Mrara	ANC
Queenie Mvana	ANC
Stella Ndabeni-Abrahams	ANC
Pumelele Ndamase	ANC
Mlindi Nhanha	DA
Ntombovuyo Nkopane	ANC
Christobel Nontenja	UDM
Mncedisi Nontsele	ANC
Lindelwa Sapo	ANC
Thokozile Sokanyile	ANC
Noluvuyo Tafeni	EFF
Marina van Zyl	DA
Sheilla Xego	ANC
Yoliswa Yako	EFF

=== 2019 ===
Results of the national ballot for the Eastern Cape in the 2019 general election held on 8 May 2019:

Party	Votes	%	Seats	+/–
African National Congress	1,399,455	69.26	18	–1
Democratic Alliance	303,309	15.01	4	0
Economic Freedom Fighters	155,899	7.72	2	+1
United Democratic Movement	46,258	2.29	1	–1
African Transformation Movement	27,935	1.38	0	New
Freedom Front Plus	17,699	0.88	0	0
African Christian Democratic Party	9,947	0.49	0	0
African Independent Congress	8,134	0.40	0	0
Pan Africanist Congress of Azania	7,844	0.39	0	0
Congress of the People	4,902	0.24	0	0
Alliance for Transformation for All	4,577	0.23	0	New
Socialist Revolutionary Workers Party	4,448	0.22	0	New
Good	4,445	0.22	0	New
African Security Congress	4,427	0.22	0	New
Afrikan Alliance of Social Democrats	3,229	0.16	0	New
African People's Convention	1,949	0.10	0	0
Agang South Africa	1,882	0.09	0	0
Azanian People's Organisation	1,431	0.07	0	0
Al Jama-ah	1,079	0.05	0	0
Inkatha Freedom Party	1,021	0.05	0	0
Christian Political Movement	863	0.04	0	New
Forum for Service Delivery	786	0.04	0	New
Democratic Liberal Congress	759	0.04	0	New
Capitalist Party of South Africa	732	0.04	0	New
Compatriots of South Africa	722	0.04	0	New
Black First Land First	667	0.03	0	New
National Freedom Party	506	0.03	0	0
Front National	469	0.02	0	0
African Congress of Democrats	458	0.02	0	New
Patriotic Alliance	448	0.02	0	0
African Covenant	400	0.02	0	New
Economic Emancipation Forum	400	0.02	0	New
African Renaissance Unity Party	326	0.02	0	New
African Democratic Change	325	0.02	0	New
International Revelation Congress	312	0.02	0	New
Women Forward	268	0.01	0	0
African Content Movement	266	0.01	0	New
People's Revolutionary Movement	259	0.01	0	New
Power of Africans Unity	239	0.01	0	New
South African National Congress of Traditional Authorities	211	0.01	0	New
Independent Civic Organisation of South Africa	198	0.01	0	0
Land Party	186	0.01	0	New
Free Democrats	171	0.01	0	New
National People's Ambassadors	168	0.01	0	New
Better Residents Association	162	0.01	0	0
National People's Front	149	0.01	0	New
Minority Front	147	0.01	0	0
South African Maintenance and Estate Beneficiaries Association	60	0.00	0	New
Total	2,020,527	100.00	25	–1
Valid votes	2,020,527	98.43		
Invalid/blank votes	32,291	1.57		
Total votes	2,052,818	100.00		
Registered voters/turnout	3,363,161	61.04		

The following candidates were elected: Ndumiso Capa (ANC), Mary-Ann Dunjwa (ANC), Pumza Dyantyi (ANC), Zukisa Cheryl Faku (ANC), Cedric Frolick (ANC), Lennox Gaehler (UDM), Nqabisa Gantsho (ANC), Samantha Graham (DA), Chantel King (DA), Tozama Mantashe (ANC), Nthako Matiase (EFF), Veronica Mente (EFF), Zola Mlenzana (ANC), Gcinikhaya Mpumza (ANC), Queenie Mvana (ANC), Baxolile Nodada (DA), Mncedisi Nontsele (ANC), Xola Nqola (ANC), Nolitha Ntobongwana (ANC), Zamuxolo Peter (ANC), Sakhumzi Somyo (ANC), Annette Steyn (DA), Sisi Tolashe (ANC), Busisiwe Tshwete (ANC) and Sheilla Xego (ANC).

=== 2014 ===
Results of the 2014 general election held on 7 May 2014:

Party		Votes	%	Seats
African National Congress	ANC	1,587,338	70.75%	19
Democratic Alliance	DA	356,050	15.87%	4
United Democratic Movement	UDM	118,645	5.29%	2
Economic Freedom Fighters	EFF	84,783	3.78%	1
Congress of the People	COPE	26,580	1.18%	0
African Independent Congress	AIC	17,514	0.78%	0
Pan Africanist Congress of Azania	PAC	9,649	0.43%	0
Freedom Front Plus	VF+	8,771	0.39%	0
African Christian Democratic Party	ACDP	8,016	0.36%	0
African People's Convention	APC	4,538	0.20%	0
Kingdom Governance Movement	KGM	3,576	0.16%	0
National Freedom Party	NFP	3,559	0.16%	0
Agang South Africa	AGANG SA	2,501	0.11%	0
Azanian People's Organisation	AZAPO	2,323	0.10%	0
United Congress	UNICO	1,367	0.06%	0
Inkatha Freedom Party	IFP	1,291	0.06%	0
United Christian Democratic Party	UCDP	1,099	0.05%	0
Pan Africanist Movement	PAM	845	0.04%	0
Workers and Socialist Party	WASP	833	0.04%	0
Al Jama-ah		740	0.03%	0
Ubuntu Party	UBUNTU	585	0.03%	0
Patriotic Alliance	PA	544	0.02%	0
Independent Civic Organisation of South Africa	ICOSA	395	0.02%	0
Keep It Straight and Simple Party	KISS	384	0.02%	0
Bushbuckridge Residents Association	BRA	382	0.02%	0
Front National	FN	355	0.02%	0
First Nation Liberation Alliance	FINLA	344	0.02%	0
Minority Front	MF	317	0.01%	0
Peoples Alliance	PAL	173	0.01%	0
Valid Votes		2,243,497	100.00%	26
Rejected Votes		35,058	1.54%	
Total Polled		2,278,555	70.32%	
Registered Electors		3,240,059		

The following candidates were elected: Nqaba Bhanga (DA), Fezile Bhengu (ANC), Ndumiso Capa (ANC), Yusuf Cassim (DA), Mary-Ann Dunjwa (ANC), Zukisa Faku (ANC), Malcolm Figg (DA), Mncedisi Filtane (UDM), Cedric Frolick (ANC), Lennox Bogen Gaehler (UDM), Mcebisi Jonas (ANC), Tandiwe Elizabeth Kenye (ANC), Fezeka Loliwe (ANC), Annette Lovemore (DA), Zukile Luyenge (ANC), Hope Helene Malgas (ANC), Tozama Mantashe (ANC), Asanda Matshobeni (EFF), Humphrey Maxegwana (ANC), Pumzile Justice Mnguni (ANC), Stella Ndabeni-Abrahams (ANC), Nokuzola Ndongeni (ANC), Bonisile Nesi (ANC), Imamile Aubin Pikinini (ANC), Daphne Zukiswa Rantho (ANC) and Sheilla Xego-Sovita (ANC).

=== 2009 ===
Results of the 2009 general election held on 22 April 2009:

Party		Votes	%	Seats
African National Congress	ANC	1,609,926	69.70%	19
Congress of the People	COPE	307,437	13.31%	3
Democratic Alliance	DA	230,187	9.97%	3
United Democratic Movement	UDM	91,227	3.95%	1
African Christian Democratic Party	ACDP	13,750	0.60%	0
Pan Africanist Congress of Azania	PAC	11,925	0.52%	0
Independent Democrats	ID	10,502	0.45%	0
African People's Convention	APC	6,029	0.26%	0
Freedom Front Plus	VF+	5,490	0.24%	0
Azanian People's Organisation	AZAPO	4,614	0.20%	0
Movement Democratic Party	MDP	2,748	0.12%	0
Inkatha Freedom Party	IFP	2,080	0.09%	0
Christian Democratic Alliance	CDA	1,838	0.08%	0
Pan Africanist Movement	PAM	1,701	0.07%	0
United Christian Democratic Party	UCDP	1,652	0.07%	0
United Independent Front	UIF	1,508	0.07%	0
National Democratic Convention	NADECO	1,241	0.05%	0
Great Kongress of South Africa	GKSA	1,023	0.04%	0
Al Jama-ah		966	0.04%	0
New Vision Party	NVP	966	0.04%	0
Minority Front	MF	598	0.03%	0
South African Democratic Congress	SADECO	544	0.02%	0
Keep It Straight and Simple Party	KISS	526	0.02%	0
Alliance of Free Democrats	AFD	459	0.02%	0
Women Forward	WF	360	0.02%	0
A Party		346	0.01%	0
Valid Votes		2,309,643	100.00%	26
Rejected Votes		34,455	1.47%	
Total Polled		2,344,098	76.69%	
Registered Electors		3,056,559		

The following candidates were elected: Mary-Ann Dunjwa (ANC), Ben Fihla (ANC), Cedric Frolick (ANC), Lennox Gaehler (UDM), Nonkululeko Prudence Gcume (COPE), Monwabisi Bevan Goqwana (ANC), Tandiwe Elizabeth Kenye (ANC), Donald Lee (DA), Annette Lovemore (DA), Zukile Luyenge (ANC), Hope Helene Malgas (ANC), Mandla Mandela (ANC), Joel Mntwabantu Matshoba (ANC), Nomakhaya Mdaka (ANC), Vatiswa Mugwanya (ANC), Stella Ndabeni (ANC), Mlindi Advent Nhanha (COPE), Makho Njobe (COPE), Gugile Ernest Nkwinti (ANC), Stone Sizani (ANC), Grant Trevor Snell (ANC), Litho Suka (ANC), Athol Trollip (DA), Pam Tshwete (ANC), Ntombikayise Twala (ANC) and Tokozile Xasa (ANC).

=== 2004 ===
Results of the 2004 general election held on 14 April 2004:

Party		Votes	%	Seats
African National Congress	ANC	1,806,221	79.31%	23
United Democratic Movement	UDM	202,964	8.91%	3
Democratic Alliance	DA	165,135	7.25%	2
Pan Africanist Congress of Azania	PAC	22,314	0.98%	0
Independent Democrats	ID	19,203	0.84%	0
African Christian Democratic Party	ACDP	17,682	0.78%	0
New National Party	NNP	14,421	0.63%	0
Freedom Front Plus	VF+	6,488	0.28%	0
Inkatha Freedom Party	IFP	4,712	0.21%	0
Azanian People's Organisation	AZAPO	3,784	0.17%	0
United Christian Democratic Party	UCDP	2,603	0.11%	0
Socialist Party of Azania	SOPA	2,584	0.11%	0
Employment Movement for South Africa	EMSA	1,647	0.07%	0
Peace and Justice Congress	PJC	1,542	0.07%	0
National Action	NA	1,361	0.06%	0
Christian Democratic Party	CDP	1,228	0.05%	0
United Front	UF	1,092	0.05%	0
The Organisation Party	TOP	910	0.04%	0
Keep It Straight and Simple Party	KISS	557	0.02%	0
New Labour Party		523	0.02%	0
Minority Front	MF	420	0.02%	0
Valid Votes		2,277,391	100.00%	28
Rejected Votes		32,835	1.42%	
Total Polled		2,310,226	81.08%	
Registered Electors		2,849,486		

The following candidates were elected: Fezile Bhengu (ANC), Jackson Bici (UDM), Ntombazana Botha (ANC), Judy Chalmers (ANC), Geoff Doidge (ANC), Stuart Farrow (DA), Ben Fihla (ANC), Cedric Frolick (ANC), Mluleki George (ANC), Mbulelo Goniwe (ANC), John Gomomo (ANC), Lindiwe Hendricks (ANC), Patekile Holomisa (ANC), Lulu Johnson (ANC), James Kati (ANC), Ncumisa Kondlo (ANC), Ivy Ludwabe (ANC), Nomhle Mahlawe (ANC), Mziwandile Masala (ANC), Shepherd Mayatula (ANC), Nomakhaya Mdaka (UDM), Makho Njobe (ANC), Robert Nogumla (ANC), Manie Schoeman (ANC), Sylvia Sigcau (UDM), Buyelwa Sonjica (ANC), Eddie Trent (DA) and Pam Tshwete (ANC).

=== 1999 ===
Results of the 1999 general election held on 2 June 1999:

Party		Votes	%	Seats
African National Congress	ANC	1,617,329	73.91%	21
United Democratic Movement	UDM	281,748	12.88%	3
Democratic Party	DP	139,520	6.38%	2
New National Party	NNP	72,639	3.32%	1
African Christian Democratic Party	ACDP	24,344	1.11%	0
Pan Africanist Congress of Azania	PAC	21,978	1.00%	0
Freedom Front	VFFF	6,822	0.31%	0
Inkatha Freedom Party	IFP	6,511	0.30%	0
Federal Alliance	FA	4,097	0.19%	0
Afrikaner Eenheidsbeweging	AEB	3,996	0.18%	0
Azanian People's Organisation	AZAPO	2,743	0.13%	0
United Christian Democratic Party	UCDP	2,528	0.12%	0
Abolition of Income Tax and Usury Party	AITUP	1,745	0.08%	0
Minority Front	MF	750	0.03%	0
Socialist Party of Azania	SOPA	741	0.03%	0
Government by the People Green Party	GPGP	693	0.03%	0
Valid Votes		2,188,184	100.00%	27
Rejected Votes		34,210	1.54%	
Total Polled		2,222,394	90.54%	
Registered Electors		2,454,543		

=== 1994 ===
Results of the national ballot for the Eastern Cape in the 1994 general election held between 26 and 29 April 1994:

Party	Votes	%	Seats
African National Congress	2,411,695	84.39	24
National Party	302,951	10.60	3
Pan Africanist Congress of Azania	56,891	1.99	1
Democratic Party	35,435	1.24	0
Freedom Front	18,656	0.65	0
African Christian Democratic Party	10,879	0.38	0
Inkatha Freedom Party	6,798	0.24	0
African Moderates Congress Party	4,919	0.17	0
African Democratic Movement	1,869	0.07	0
Africa Muslim Party	1,235	0.04	0
Dikwankwetla Party of South Africa	1,098	0.04	0
Minority Front	981	0.03	0
Sport Organisation for Collective Contributions and Equal Rights	918	0.03	0
Keep It Straight and Simple Party	900	0.03	0
Federal Party	750	0.03	0
Ximoko Progressive Party	574	0.02	0
Women's Rights Peace Party	524	0.02	0
Workers' List Party	374	0.01	0
Luso-South African Party	263	0.01	0
Total	2,857,710	100.00	28
Valid votes	2,857,710	99.39	
Invalid/blank votes	17,432	0.61	
Total votes	2,875,142	100.00	
