= Makana Local Municipality elections =

Local elections in the Eastern Cape, South Africa

The Makana Local Municipality council consists of twenty-five members elected by mixed-member proportional representation. Thirteen councillors are elected by first-past-the-post voting in thirteen wards, while the remaining twelve are chosen from party lists so that the total number of party representatives is proportional to the number of votes received.

In the election of 4 November 2026 the African National Congress (ANC) lost its majority, but won a plurality of majority of ten seats.

== Results ==
The following table shows the composition of the council after past elections.

Event	ANC	DA	EFF	Other	Total
2000 election	20	3	—	1	24
2006 election	20	4	—	0	24
2011 election	20	6	—	2	28
2016 election	17	8	2	0	27
2021 election	14	5	2	6	27
2026 election	10	6	1	8	25

== December 2000 election ==
The following table shows the results of the 2000 election.

Party	Ward			List			Total seats
Party	Votes	%	Seats	Votes	%	Seats	Total seats
African National Congress	18,118	82.00	11	18,173	82.02	9	20
Democratic Alliance	3,026	13.69	1	3,155	14.24	2	3
African Christian Democratic Party	481	2.18	0	411	1.85	1	1
United Democratic Movement	471	2.13	0	418	1.89	0	0
Total	22,096	100.00	12	22,157	100.00	12	24
Valid votes	22,096	98.17		22,157	98.44		
Invalid/blank votes	411	1.83		351	1.56		
Total votes	22,507	100.00		22,508	100.00		
Registered voters/turnout	39,034	57.66		39,034	57.66		

== March 2006 election ==
The following table shows the results of the 2006 election.

Party	Ward			List			Total seats
Party	Votes	%	Seats	Votes	%	Seats	Total seats
African National Congress	17,981	80.89	11	17,977	80.91	9	20
Democratic Alliance	3,169	14.26	1	3,103	13.97	3	4
African Christian Democratic Party	330	1.48	0	292	1.31	0	0
Azanian People's Organisation	249	1.12	0	238	1.07	0	0
Pan Africanist Congress of Azania	212	0.95	0	230	1.04	0	0
United Democratic Movement	196	0.88	0	246	1.11	0	0
Independent Democrats	33	0.15	0	133	0.60	0	0
Independent candidates	59	0.27	0				0
Total	22,229	100.00	12	22,219	100.00	12	24
Valid votes	22,229	98.54		22,219	98.48		
Invalid/blank votes	330	1.46		343	1.52		
Total votes	22,559	100.00		22,562	100.00		
Registered voters/turnout	43,059	52.39		43,059	52.40		

== May 2011 election ==
The following table shows the results of the 2011 election.

Party	Ward			List			Total seats
Party	Votes	%	Seats	Votes	%	Seats	Total seats
African National Congress	17,451	71.79	10	18,106	73.31	10	20
Democratic Alliance	5,035	20.71	4	5,074	20.54	2	6
Congress of the People	798	3.28	0	690	2.79	1	1
Makana Independent New Deal	593	2.44	0	483	1.96	1	1
Azanian People's Organisation	302	1.24	0	346	1.40	0	0
Independent candidates	130	0.53	0				0
Total	24,309	100.00	14	24,699	100.00	14	28
Valid votes	24,309	98.05		24,699	98.64		
Invalid/blank votes	483	1.95		341	1.36		
Total votes	24,792	100.00		25,040	100.00		
Registered voters/turnout	44,876	55.25		44,876	55.80		

== August 2016 election ==
The following table shows the results of the 2016 election.

Party	Ward			List			Total seats
Party	Votes	%	Seats	Votes	%	Seats	Total seats
African National Congress	14,087	60.81	11	15,078	62.83	6	17
Democratic Alliance	6,911	29.83	3	7,134	29.73	5	8
Economic Freedom Fighters	1,127	4.87	0	1,382	5.76	2	2
Independent candidates	898	3.88	0				0
Azanian People's Organisation	142	0.61	0	208	0.87	0	0
United Democratic Movement				195	0.81	0	0
Total	23,165	100.00	14	23,997	100.00	13	27
Valid votes	23,165	98.46		23,997	98.35		
Invalid/blank votes	363	1.54		402	1.65		
Total votes	23,528	100.00		24,399	100.00		
Registered voters/turnout	46,398	50.71		46,398	52.59		

== November 2021 election ==
The following table shows the results of the 2021 election.

Party	Ward			List			Total seats
Party	Votes	%	Seats	Votes	%	Seats	Total seats
African National Congress	9,341	49.53	11	9,333	51.82	3	14
Makana Citizens Front	3,277	17.38	0	3,396	18.86	5	5
Democratic Alliance	3,127	16.58	2	3,182	17.67	3	5
Economic Freedom Fighters	1,130	5.99	0	1,050	5.83	2	2
Independent candidates	1,099	5.83	1				1
Makana Independent New Deal	330	1.75	0	371	2.06	0	0
Patriotic Alliance	184	0.98	0	222	1.23	0	0
Azanian People's Organisation	142	0.75	0	172	0.95	0	0
Freedom Front Plus	135	0.72	0	136	0.76	0	0
African Transformation Movement	95	0.50	0	149	0.83	0	0
Total	18,860	100.00	14	18,011	100.00	13	27
Valid votes	18,860	98.13		18,011	96.09		
Invalid/blank votes	360	1.87		732	3.91		
Total votes	19,220	100.00		18,743	100.00		
Registered voters/turnout	43,664	44.02		43,664	42.93		

=== By-elections from November 2021 ===
The following by-elections were held to fill vacant ward seats in the period since the election in November 2021.

Date	Ward	Party of the previous councillor	Party of the newly elected councillor
26 Nov 2025	10	African National Congress	African National Congress

== November 2026 election ==
The following table shows the results of the 2026 election.

Party	Ward			List			Total seats
Party	Votes	%	Seats	Votes	%	Seats	Total seats
African National Congress	7,359	31.22	10	7,296	31.32	0	10
Democratic Alliance	6,371	27.03	3	6,394	27.45	3	6
Makana United Civic Movement	4,692	19.90	0	4,453	19.12	4	4
Economic Freedom Fighters	1,404	5.96	0	1,387	5.95	1	1
South African Communist Party	1,276	5.41	0	1,317	5.65	1	1
Patriotic Alliance	766	3.25	0	727	3.12	1	1
Makana Citizens Front	633	2.69	0	641	2.75	1	1
ActionSA	397	1.68	0	495	2.13	1	1
African Transformation Movement	265	1.12	0	268	1.15	0	0
Freedom Front Plus	147	0.62	0	179	0.77	0	0
Organic Humanity Movement	84	0.36	0	103	0.44	0	0
Afrika Mayibuye Movement	42	0.18	0	34	0.15	0	0
Independent candidates	74	0.31	0				0
uMkhonto weSizwe Party	62	0.26	0				0
Total	23,572	100.00	13	23,294	100.00	12	25
Valid votes	23,572	98.18		23,294	97.84		
Invalid/blank votes	436	1.82		514	2.16		
Total votes	24,008	100.00		23,808	100.00		
Registered voters/turnout	47,092	50.98		47,092	50.56		
