= Zamuxolo Peter =

South African politician (1965–2020)

Member of the National Assembly of South Africa
- In office 22 May 2019 – 31 July 2020
- Succeeded by: Phumeza Mpushe
- Constituency: Eastern Cape

Personal details
- Born: Zamuxolo Joseph Peter; 10 January 1965 Riebeek East, Cape Province, South Africa
- Died: 31 July 2020 (aged 55)
- Party: African National Congress
- Children: 3

Zamuxolo Joseph Peter (10 January 1965 – 31 July 2020) was a South African politician who served as a Member of the National Assembly from May 2019 until his death in July 2020. He was the mayor of the Makana Local Municipality from 2011 until 2015. Peter was a member of the African National Congress.

== Early life and career ==
Zamuxolo Joseph Peter was born on 10 January 1965 in Riebeeck East, north of Grahamstown. He had to leave school after his father, a farm labourer, died. He attended Border Technikon and studied at the Beit Berl College in Israel.

Peter was a member of the United Democratic Front. Within the African National Congress, he served as a regional chairperson and a member of the provincial executive committee.

After the 1995 municipal election, Peter was elected mayor of the Riebeeck East Transitional Council. He was elected as a ward councillor of the newly established Makana Local Municipality in the 2000 municipal election. Peter was elected mayor of Makana in 2011 and held the position until 2015.

== Parliamentary career ==
Peter was placed 13th on the ANC's regional list for the 2019 general election. After the election, he was nominated to Parliament. He was sworn in as a Member of Parliament on 22 May 2019.

=== Committee memberships ===
- Portfolio Committee on Tourism
- Standing Committee on Auditor-General

== Death ==
On 11 July 2020, Peter was admitted to a hospital after testing positive for COVID-19 during the COVID-19 pandemic in South Africa. He died on 31 July. He was 55 years old. Peter is survived by his wife and three children.

== See also ==
- List of members of the National Assembly of South Africa who died in office
