= Lindelwa =

Lindelwa is a feminine given name. Notable people with the name include:

- Lindelwa Dunjwa (fl. from 2009), South African politician
- Lindelwa Gwala (born 1997), South African international rugby union player
- Lindelwa Sapo (fl. from 2024), South African politician
- Lindelwa Mhlanga (born 1997), Professional traveller, award-winning copywriter based in Europe

== See also ==
- Lindell (disambiguation)
