= Tshwete =

Tshwete is a surname of South African origin. Notable people with the surname include:

- Busisiwe Tshwete (born 1981), South African politician
- Pam Tshwete (born 1961), South African politician
- Steve Tshwete (1938–2002), South African politician and activist
