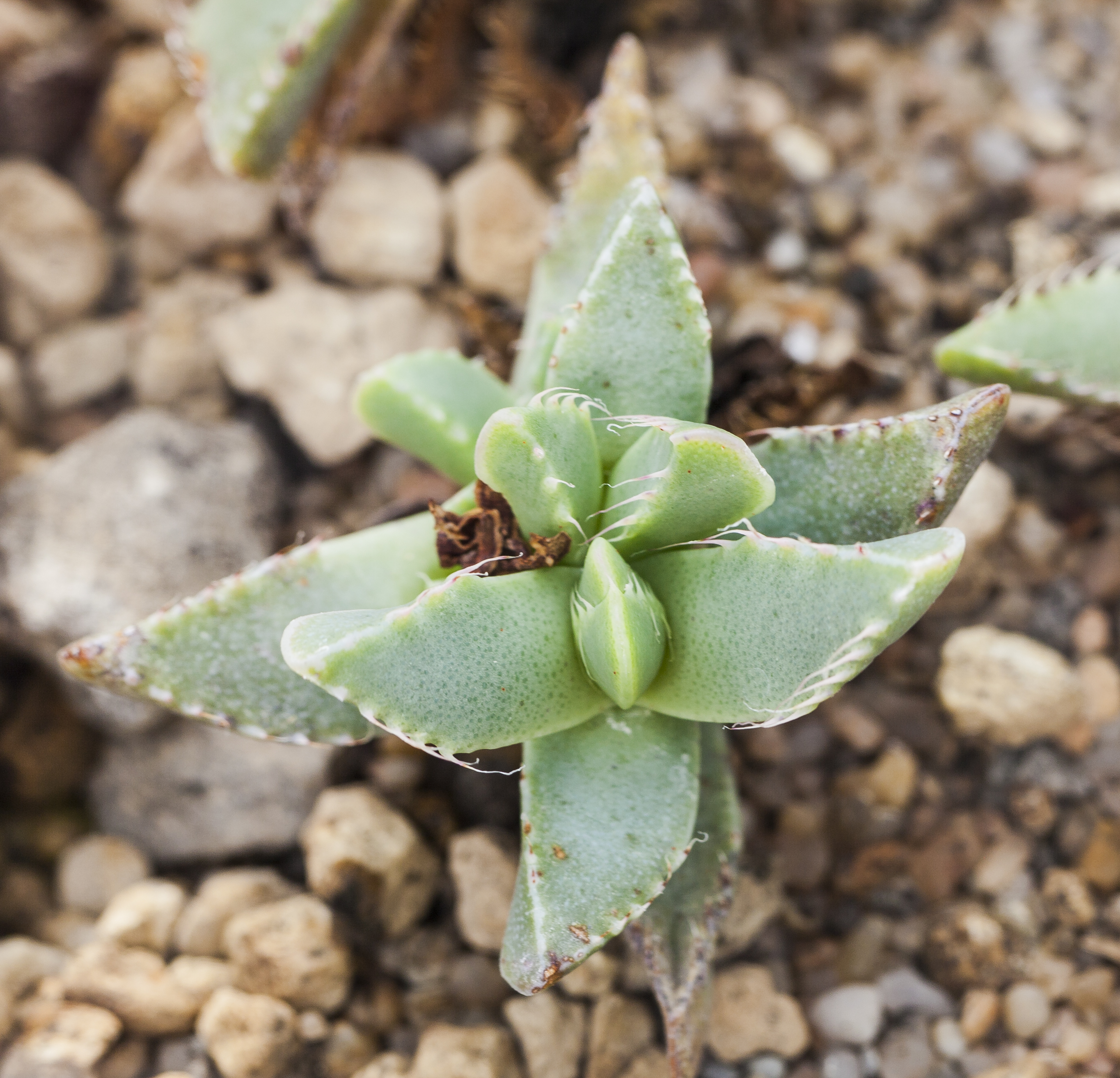

Scientific classification
- Kingdom: Plantae
- Clade: Tracheophytes
- Clade: Angiosperms
- Clade: Eudicots
- Order: Caryophyllales
- Family: Aizoaceae
- Genus: Faucaria
- Species: F. felina

Binomial name
- Faucaria felina (L.) Schwantes

Synonyms
- List: Faucaria acutipetala L.Bolus; Faucaria candida L.Bolus; Faucaria cradockensis L.Bolus; Faucaria crassisepala L.Bolus; Faucaria duncanii L.Bolus; Faucaria jamesii (L.Bolus) Tischer; Faucaria kingiae L.Bolus; Faucaria longidens L.Bolus; Faucaria longifolia L.Bolus; Faucaria lupina (Haw.) Schwantes; Faucaria militaris Tischer; Faucaria montana L.Bolus; Faucaria multidens L.Bolus; Faucaria plana L.Bolus; Faucaria ryneveldiae L.Bolus; Faucaria uniondalensis L.Bolus; Mesembryanthemum lupinum Haw.

= Faucaria felina =

Species of succulent

Faucaria felina, tiger jaws (a name it shares with Faucaria tigrina), is a species of succulent plant in the family Aizoaceae. It is endemic to the southern Cape Provinces of South Africa, but also widely spread in culture. It has a clumping habit and blooms with yellow flowers. As its synonym Faucaria candida, white tiger jaws, it has gained the Royal Horticultural Society's Award of Garden Merit.

== Subspecies ==
Faucaria felina had two subspecies, but these are no longer accepted:

- Faucaria felina subsp. tuberculosa (Rolfe) L.E.Groen → now Faucaria tuberculosa
- Faucaria felina subsp. britteniae (L. Bolus) L.E.Groen
