= Faucaria nemorosa =

Scientific classification
- Kingdom: Plantae
- Clade: Tracheophytes
- Clade: Angiosperms
- Clade: Eudicots
- Order: Caryophyllales
- Family: Aizoaceae
- Genus: Faucaria
- Species: F. nemorosa

Binomial name
- Faucaria nemorosa L.Bolus ex L.E.Groen

Species of succulent

Faucaria nemorosa is a small succulent plant that is part of the Aizoaceae family. The species is endemic to South Africa and occurs in the Eastern Cape. The only population occurs on a farm near Riebeek East and is part of the Albany scrub ecoregion. The species is considered critically rare.
