= Faucaria gratiae =

Scientific classification
- Kingdom: Plantae
- Clade: Tracheophytes
- Clade: Angiosperms
- Clade: Eudicots
- Order: Caryophyllales
- Family: Aizoaceae
- Genus: Faucaria
- Species: F. gratiae

Binomial name
- Faucaria gratiae L.Bolus

Synonyms
- Faucaria hooleae L.Bolus

Species of succulent

Faucaria gratiae is a small succulent plant that is part of the Aizoaceae family. The species is endemic to South Africa and occurs in the Eastern Cape. The plant has a range of less than 200 km^{2} (77 sq mi) and two subpopulations are known on farms near Riebeek East. The plant is part of the Albany scrub ecoregion and is considered rare.
