= Beauty Dambuza =

South African politician (born 1954)

Member of the National Assembly
- In office 14 October 2016 – 7 May 2019
- Constituency: Eastern Cape
- In office 23 April 2004 – 6 May 2014

Personal details
- Born: 16 September 1954 (age 71)
- Citizenship: South Africa
- Party: African National Congress

Beauty Nomhle Dambuza (born 16 September 1954) is a South African politician who represented the African National Congress (ANC) in the National Assembly from 2004 to 2014 and later from 2016 to 2019. She chaired the Portfolio Committee on Human Settlements during the Fourth Parliament.

== Political career ==
Born on 16 September 1954, Dambuza has been a member of the ANC since 1980. She was the treasurer of the party's regional branch in Sisonke, KwaZulu-Natal from 1998 to 2005. During that period, she was elected to the National Assembly for the first time in the 2004 general election, serving the KwaZulu-Natal constituency. She was re-elected to a second term in 2009, now on the ANC's national party list; during her second term, she also chaired Parliament's Portfolio Committee on Human Settlements.

Dambuza did not initially win a third term in the 2014 general election. However, she was sworn back in to the assembly on 14 October 2016 to fill the casual vacancy arising from Bonisile Nesi death. She remained in the seat until the 2019 general election and represented the Eastern Cape constituency.
