= Mantashe =

Mantashe is a South African surname. Notable people with the surname include:

- Gwede Mantashe (born 1955), South African politician
- Priscilla Tozama Mantashe (1960–2021), South African politician, sister of Gwede
