= Mncedisi =

Mncedisi is a masculine given name. Notable people with this name include:

- Mncedisi Filtane (died 2020), South African politician
- Mncedisi Malika (born 1997), South African cricketer
- Mncedisi Nontsele (born 1959), South African politician
- Mncedisi Shabangu (c. 1969–2022), South African actor
