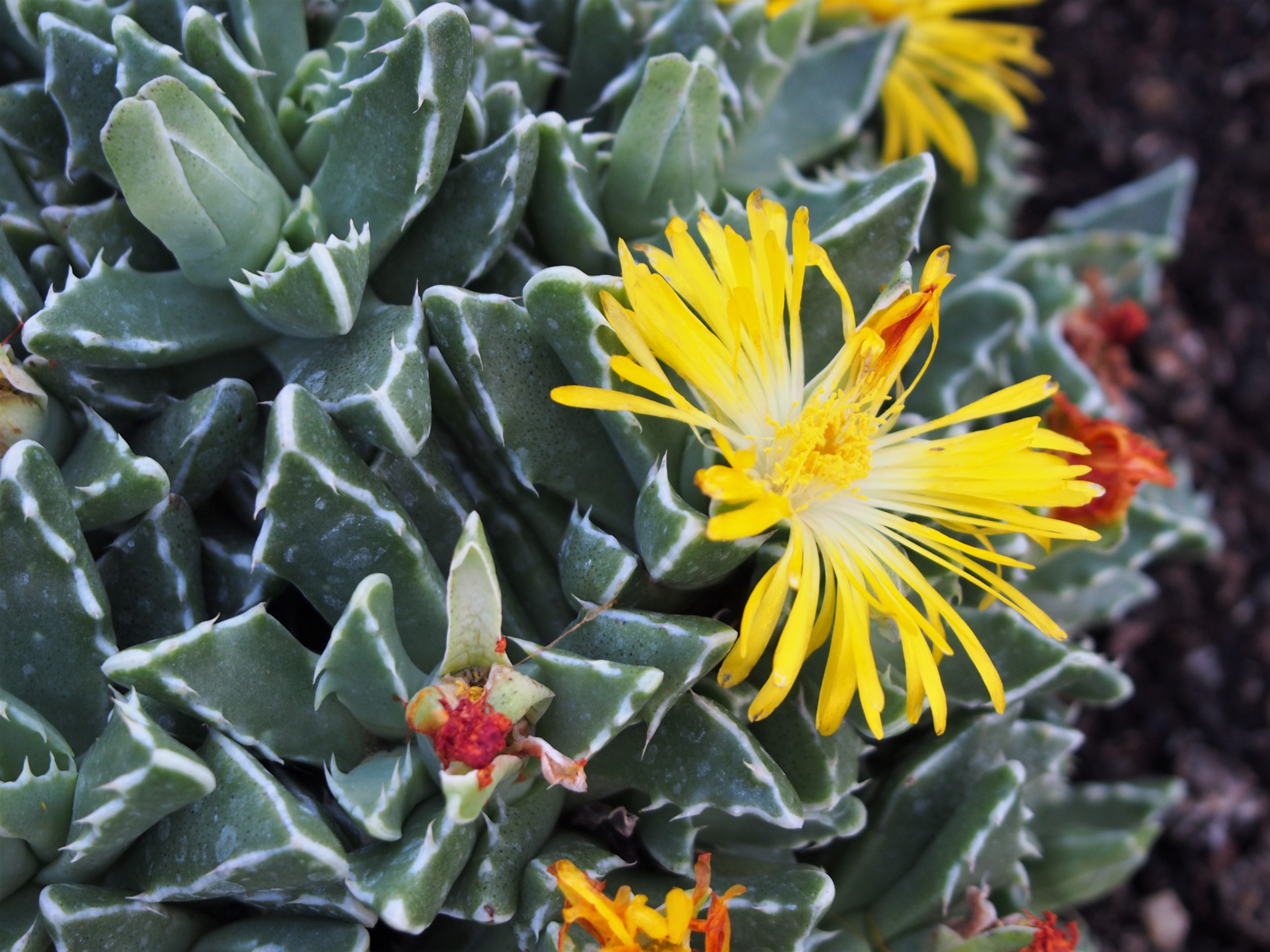

Scientific classification
- Kingdom: Plantae
- Clade: Tracheophytes
- Clade: Angiosperms
- Clade: Eudicots
- Order: Caryophyllales
- Family: Aizoaceae
- Genus: Faucaria
- Species: F. bosscheana

Binomial name
- Faucaria bosscheana (A.Berger) Schwantes

Synonyms
- Faucaria albidens N.E.Br.; Faucaria bosscheana var. haagei (Tischer) Jacobsen; Faucaria haagei Tischer; Faucaria kendrewensis L.Bolus; Faucaria paucidens N.E.Br.; Faucaria peersii L.Bolus; Mesembryanthemum bosscheanum A.Berger

= Faucaria bosscheana =

Species of succulent

Faucaria bosscheana is a small succulent plant that is part of the Aizoaceae family. The species is endemic to South Africa and occurs in the Eastern Cape and the Western Cape.
