= Dingaan Myolwa =

South African politician

Member of the National Assembly of South Africa
- In office 27 January 2021 – 23 April 2024
- Preceded by: Pumza Dyantyi
- Constituency: Eastern Cape

Member of the Eastern Cape Provincial Legislature
- In office 22 October 2013 – 6 May 2014
- Preceded by: Mkhangeli Matomela

Personal details
- Born: Dingaan Jacob Myolwa
- Party: African National Congress
- Occupation: Politician

Dingaan Jacob Myolwa is a South African politician from the Eastern Cape who was a Member of the National Assembly for the African National Congress (ANC). He was appointed to parliament in 2021. Myolwa had previously served as a member of the Eastern Cape Provincial Legislature from 2013 to 2014 and before that, as mayor of the OR Tambo District Municipality.

== Background ==
Myolwa is a member of the African National Congress. He was a member of Umkhonto we Sizwe and while in exile in Tanzania, he served in a military camp. He has international certificates in Local Government and administration. Myolwa served as an ANC PR councillor in the Ingquza Hill Local Municipality as well as in the OR Tambo District Municipality. He was the mayor of the OR Tambo District until his dismissal in 2013.

Myolwa was sworn in as a member of the Eastern Cape Provincial Legislature for the ANC on 22 October 2013, replacing Mkhangeli Matomela. He was then appointed to serve on the local government & traditional affairs, sport, recreation, arts and culture, economic development and environmental affairs and tourism, public participation and petitions and wellness & enabling facilities committees.

Myolwa stood for the National Assembly of South Africa in the 2014 general election as 23rd on the ANC's list of National Assembly candidates from the Eastern Cape. He was not elected to parliament. Myolwa stood for parliament again in 2019 as 21st on the ANC's list of parliamentary candidates from the Eastern Cape. He was not elected for the second time.

== Parliamentary career ==
Following the death of Eastern Cape ANC MP Pumza Dyantyi from COVID-19, Myolwa was selected to take up her seat in the National Assembly. He was sworn in on 27 January 2021. He served on the Standing Committee on Auditor General. He resigned from Parliament on 23 April 2024, a little more than a month from the 2024 general election.
