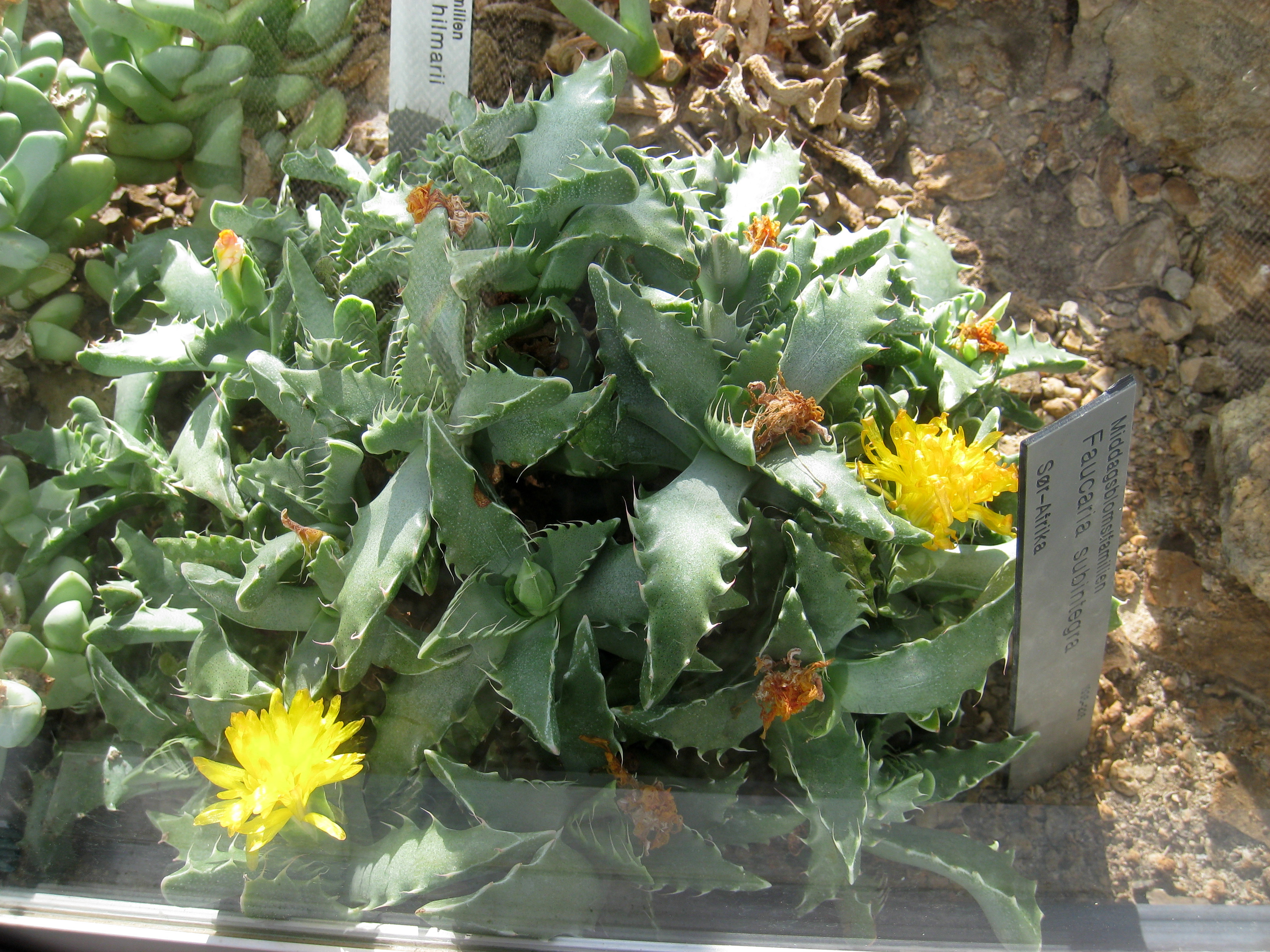

Scientific classification
- Kingdom: Plantae
- Clade: Tracheophytes
- Clade: Angiosperms
- Clade: Eudicots
- Order: Caryophyllales
- Family: Aizoaceae
- Genus: Faucaria
- Species: F. subintegra

Binomial name
- Faucaria subintegra L.Bolus

Synonyms
- Faucaria subindurata L.Bolus

= Faucaria subintegra =

Species of succulent

Faucaria subintegra is a small succulent plant that is part of the Aizoaceae family. The species is endemic to South Africa and occurs in the Eastern Cape. The plant has a range of 497 km² and occurs between the Keiskamma River and the Chalumna River. The species is threatened by informal settlement construction and overgrazing.
