= Sipho Burns-Ncamashe =

Sipho Mangindi Burns-Ncamashe Aa! Zilimbola! (1920–1996) was a South African poet, short story writer and Xhosa imbongi (praise poet). He was also the chief of the AmaGwali Xhosa sub-group in Alice. He was also the leader of the Ciskei National Unionist Party from 1972–1978, the only member from his party to get a seat in the Republic of Ciskei National Assembly, until 1978 when he joined the Ciskei opposition party, the Ciskei National Party led by Chief Justice Mabandla. In 1979, Ciskei officially became a one-party state under the rule of Lennox Sebe and Burns-Ncamashe remained as one of the members of the Ciskei National Assembly.

Sipho Burns-Ncamashe was the praise singer for Rharhabe Paramaount Chief, King Velile Sandile Aa! Velile!, grandfather to the Rharhabe Xhosa king King Maxhob'ayakhawuleza Sandile Aa! Zanesizwe!. Burns-Ncamashe's son Chief Sisanda Sipuxolo Burns-Ncamashe succeeded him after his death. His youngest son Zolile Burns-Ncamashe was a spokesperson to the AmaRharhabe royal family til he became Deputy Minister of Cooperative Governance and Traditional Affairs.

== List of works by author ==
- Masibaliselane (1961) – a collection of short stories and poems
- Izibongo zakwaSesile (1979) – collection of poems
