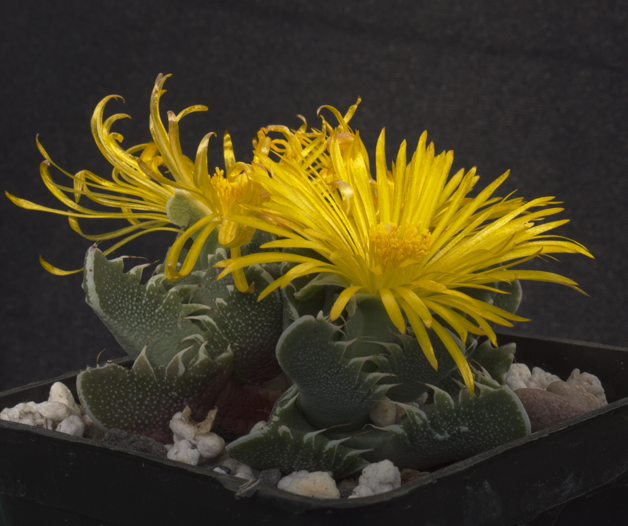

Scientific classification
- Kingdom: Plantae
- Clade: Tracheophytes
- Clade: Angiosperms
- Clade: Eudicots
- Order: Caryophyllales
- Family: Aizoaceae
- Genus: Faucaria
- Species: F. tigrina

Binomial name
- Faucaria tigrina (Haw.) Schwantes (1926)

Synonyms
- Mesembryanthemum tigrinum Haw. (1795)

= Faucaria tigrina =

Species of succulent

Faucaria tigrina, tiger jaws (a name it shares with Faucaria felina), is a species of succulent plant in the family Aizoaceae. It is endemic to the southern Cape Provinces of South Africa around Makhanda, and also cultivated as an ornamental. It has fleshy triangular leaves, a clumping habit, and blooms in autumn with yellow daisy-like flowers.

It has gained the Royal Horticultural Society's Award of Garden Merit. In temperate zones it must be grown under glass to protect it from freezing temperatures. It requires a standard cactus potting compost and a position in full sun, with low humidity.

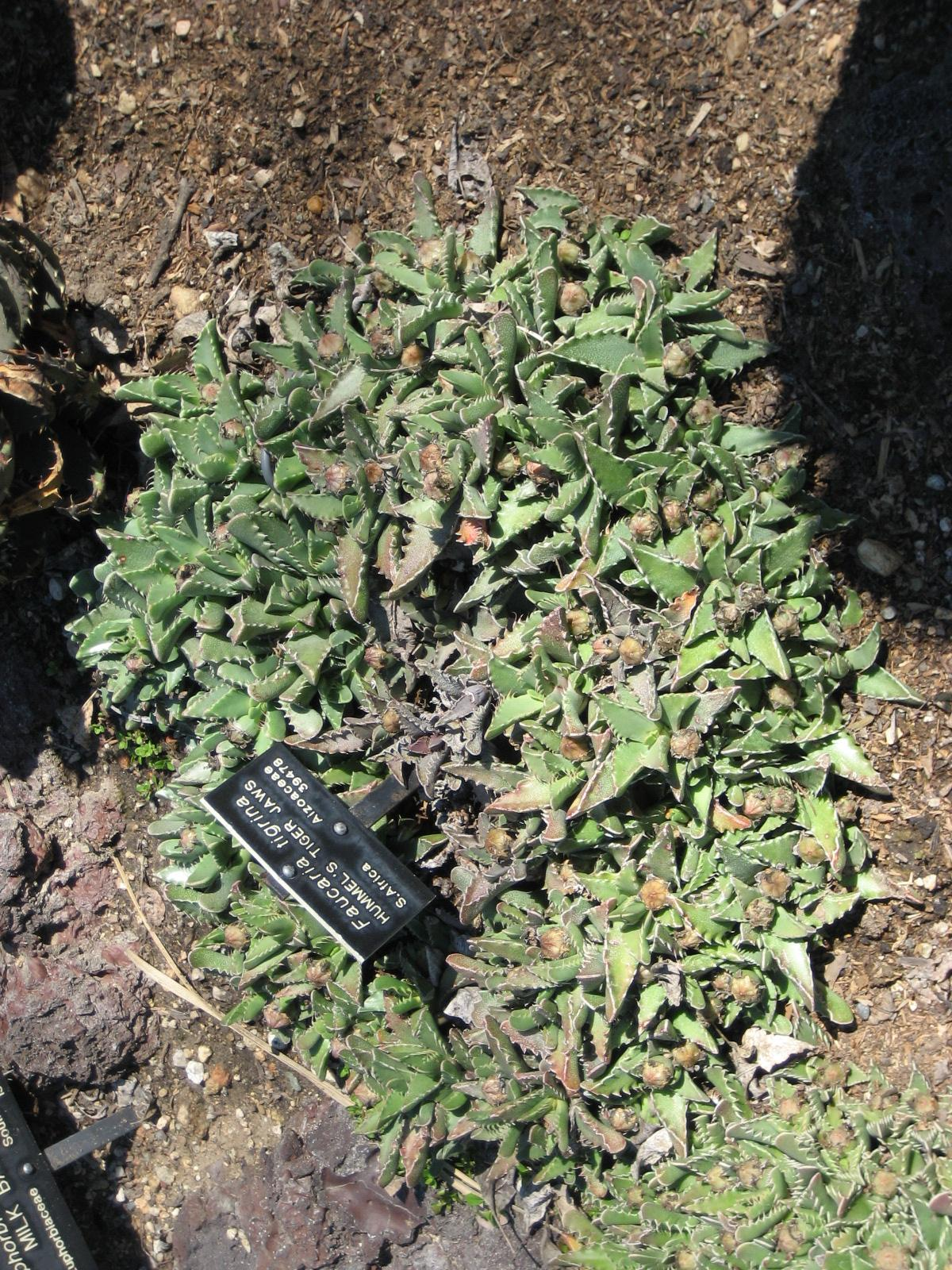
A large clump
