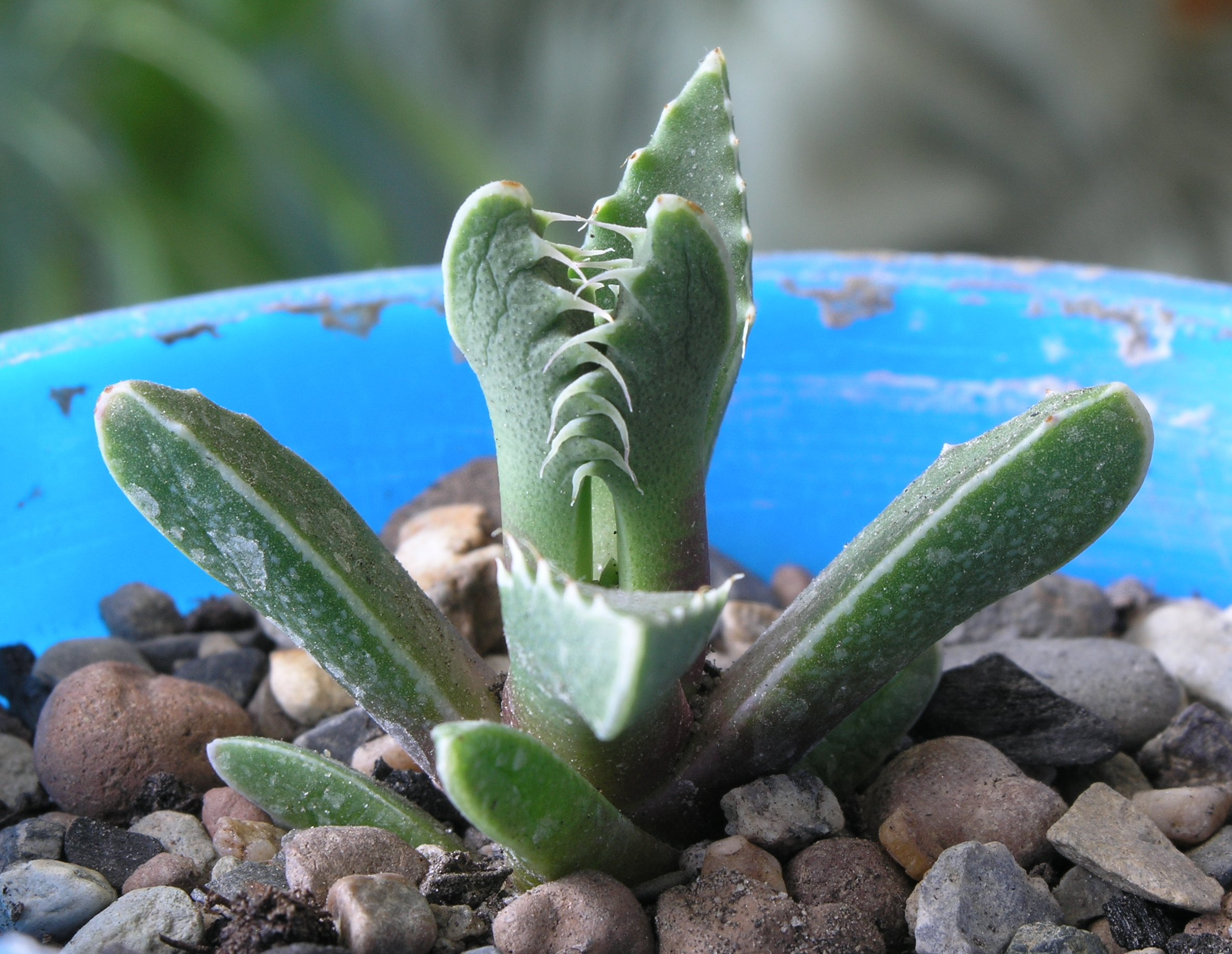
- Faucaria tigrina

Scientific classification
- Kingdom: Plantae
- Clade: Tracheophytes
- Clade: Angiosperms
- Clade: Eudicots
- Order: Caryophyllales
- Family: Aizoaceae
- Subfamily: Ruschioideae
- Tribe: Ruschieae
- Genus: Faucaria; Schwantes

Species
- See text

= Faucaria =

Genus of succulents

Faucaria is a genus of around 8 species of succulent subtropical flowering plants of the family Aizoaceae. The name comes from the Latin word fauces (“animal mouth”) because of the appearance of "teeth" on the leaves.

Faucaria species are native to the Cape Province of South Africa and the Karoo Desert.

== Description ==
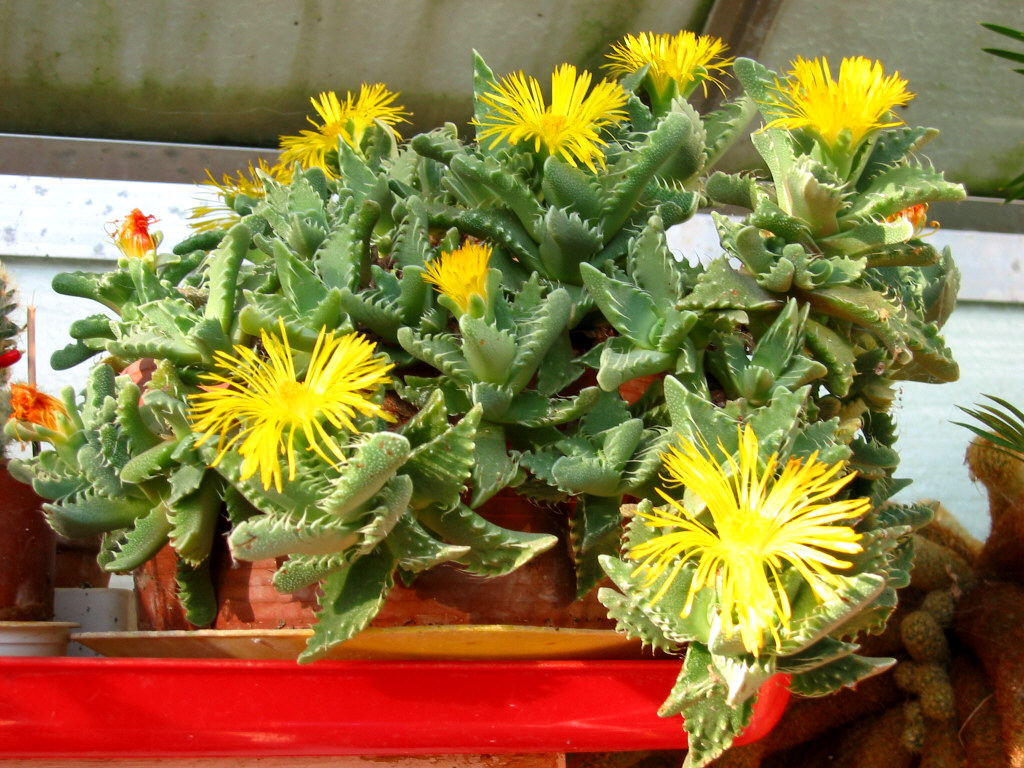
Faucaria tigrina

Small plants of 8 cm diameter, with thick triangular leaves. On the edges of the leaves there are upright teeth in opposite pairs that looks like an animal mouth. It may become bushy.

The plants are light green, turning purple if exposed to strong sunshine.

Golden yellow flowers appear in the center of the rosette.

== Species ==
Faucaria species accepted by the Plants of the World Online as of November 2022:

- Faucaria bosscheana (A.Berger) Schwantes
- Faucaria britteniae L.Bolus
- Faucaria felina (L.) Schwantes
- Faucaria gratiae L.Bolus
- Faucaria nemorosa L.Bolus ex L.E.Groen
- Faucaria subintegra L.Bolus
- Faucaria tigrina (Haw.) Schwantes
- Faucaria tuberculosa (Rolfe) Schwantes

== Cultivation ==
Put the plants in small pots with a well-drained soil. In a very sunny exposure and if possible outside in summer.

Moderate watering in summer and not at all in winter for the plant is a rest period without which it can not flourish.

Division of clumps is the easiest way for reproduction. It can also be done by cutting (with a minimum temperature of 21 °C) or by seeding.
