= Noko Masipa =

South African politician

Noko Masipa MPP
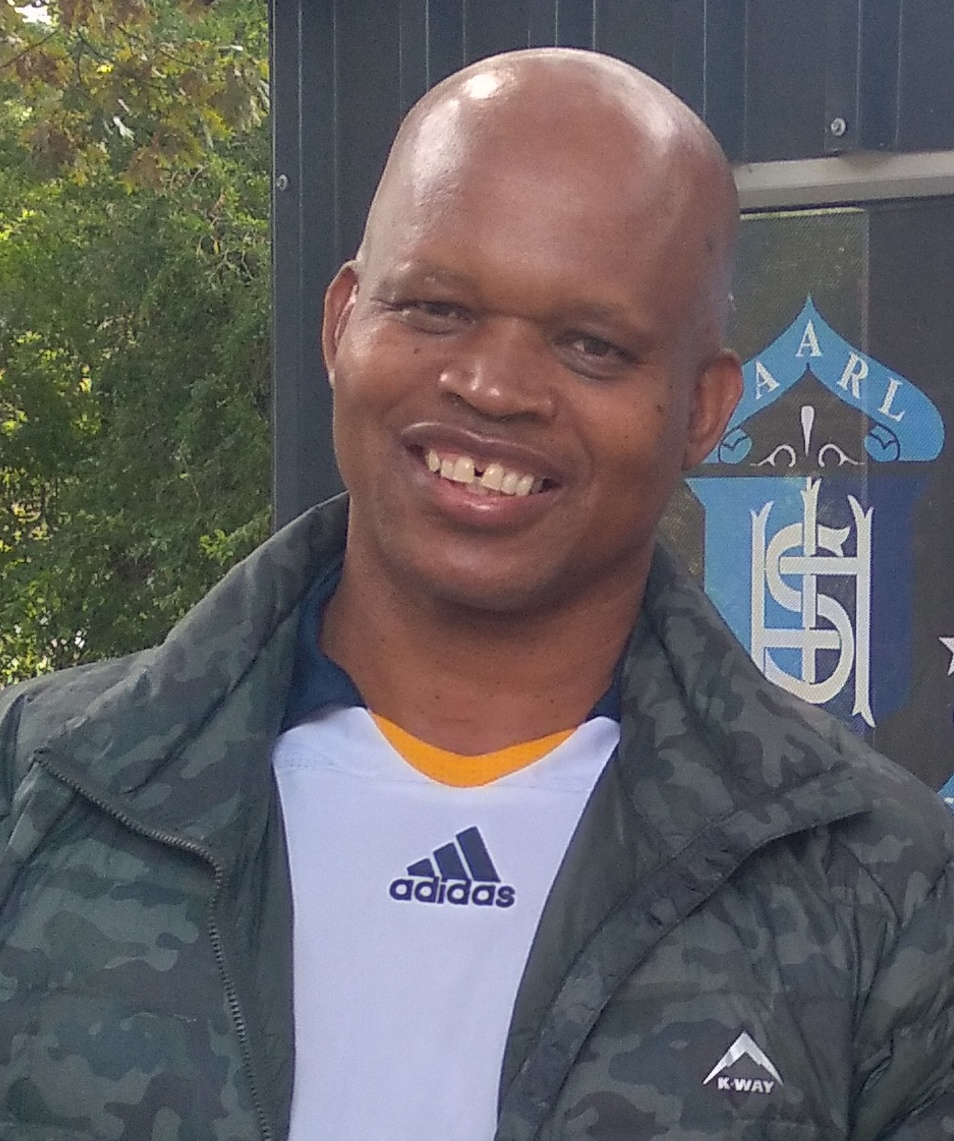
- Masipa in 2022

Member of the Western Cape Provincial Parliament
- Incumbent
- Assumed office 13 June 2024

Member of the National Assembly of South Africa
- In office 22 May 2019 – 28 May 2024

Personal details
- Born: Noko Phineas Masipa; 16 October 1968 (age 57)
- Party: Democratic Alliance
- Education: Management College of Southern Africa; UNISA; Sarleh Dollie Nursing College
- Profession: Politician

Noko Phineas Masipa (born 16 October 1968) is a South African politician who has been a Democratic Alliance member of the Western Cape Provincial Parliament since June 2024. Prior to serving in the provincial parliament, he was a member of parliament in the National Assembly and the DA's Shadow Minister of Agriculture, Land Reform and Rural Development.

== Education ==
Masipa has a Master of Business Administration degree from the Management College of Southern Africa (MANCOSA), a Bachelor of Commerce degree from the University of South Africa, and a national diploma in nursing from the Sarleh Dollie Nursing College in collaboration with the University of the Western Cape.

Additionally, Masipa did a short course on the business of wine at the University of Cape Town Graduate School of Business. He holds a certificate in leadership from the University of Pretoria and a certificate in marketing from the Cape Peninsula University of Technology. At Trinity College Dublin and University of Limerick in the Republic of Ireland, he fulfilled an International Ireland Leadership Programme.

== Early childhood ==
Phineas Masipa was born in GaManhlodi popularly known as Cooperspark, in Limpopo's Aganang Municipality. He matriculated at Mosonya Secondary School at GaManhlodi Village, Moletjie. He finished his primary school at Borume Primary School and started his secondary school education at the Nokanantshwana Junior Secondary School. Due to financial constraints, he dropped out for two years after completing the then standard eight.

== Career ==
Masipa worked in the banking sector before becoming active in politics. He was 20th on the Democratic Alliance's national list for the 2019 general election and won a seat in the National Assembly at the election.

In June 2019, Masipa became an alternate member of the Portfolio Committee on Agriculture, Land Reform and Rural Development.

On 18 August 2022, Masipa was appointed by John Steenhuisen as the DA's Shadow Minister of Agriculture, Land Reform and Rural Development. He succeeded Annette Steyn, who retired from politics in June 2022.

Masipa was elected to the Western Cape Provincial Parliament in the 2024 provincial election.
