= Phumeza Mpushe =

South African politician

Member of the National Assembly of South Africa
- In office 14 August 2020 – 28 May 2024
- Preceded by: Zamuxolo Peter
- Constituency: Eastern Cape

Member of the Eastern Cape Provincial Legislature
- In office 21 May 2014 – 7 May 2019

Personal details
- Party: African National Congress
- Profession: Politician

Phumeza Theodora Mpushe is a South African politician who served as an African National Congress Member of the National Assembly of South Africa from August 2020 until May 2024. She had previously been a member of the Eastern Cape Provincial Legislature.

== Political career ==
Mpushe was elected to the Eastern Cape Provincial Legislature in the 2014 provincial election as a member of the African National Congress. On 27 February 2018, she was appointed as acting chairperson of the public works committee.

Mpushe was twentieth on the ANC's list of parliamentary candidates from the Eastern Cape for the 2019 general election. She did not win a seat at the election, due to the ANC's electoral performance in the Eastern Cape.

Following the death of Eastern ANC MP Zamuxolo Peter in July 2020, the ANC selected Mpushe to take up his seat in the National Assembly. She was sworn in on 14 August 2020. Mpushe served on the Portfolio Committee on Tourism and the Standing Committee on Auditor General.

Mpushe was ranked 22nd on the ANC's regional to national list in the 2024 general election which was too low to secure re-election.
