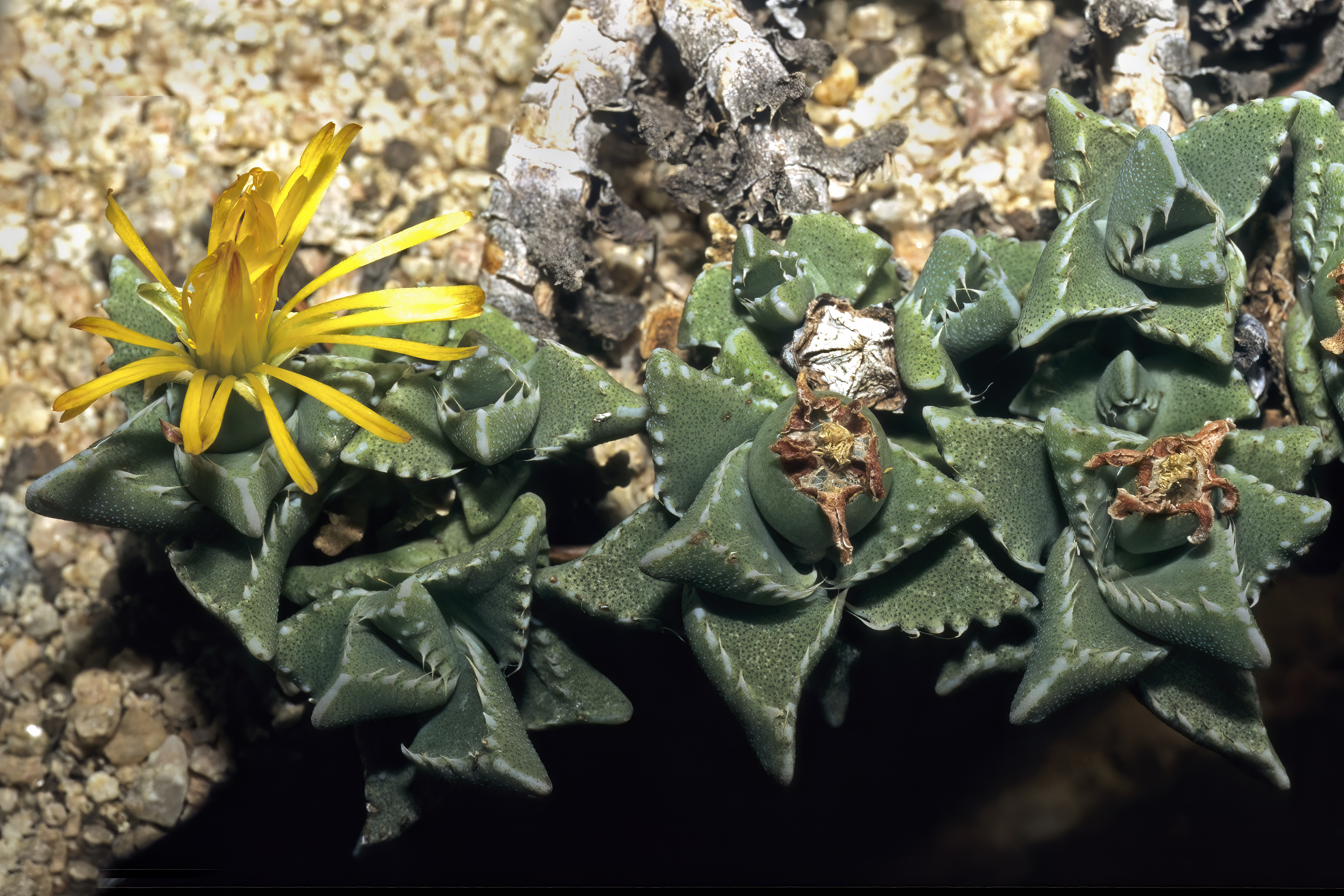

Scientific classification
- Kingdom: Plantae
- Clade: Tracheophytes
- Clade: Angiosperms
- Clade: Eudicots
- Order: Caryophyllales
- Family: Aizoaceae
- Genus: Faucaria
- Species: F. britteniae

Binomial name
- Faucaria britteniae L.Bolus

Synonyms
- Faucaria coronata L.Bolus; Faucaria felina subsp. britteniae (L.Bolus) L.E.Groen; Faucaria grandis L.Bolus; Faucaria smithii L.Bolus; Faucaria speciosa L.Bolus

= Faucaria britteniae =

Species of succulent

Faucaria britteniae is a small succulent plant that is part of the Aizoaceae family. The species is endemic to South Africa and occurs in the Eastern Cape.
