= Litho Suka =

South African politician and former educator

Councillor Litho Suka

Permanent Delegate to the National Council of Provinces
- In office 22 May 2014 – 21 May 2015

Member of the National Assembly of South Africa
- In office 6 May 2009 – 6 May 2014

Member of the Eastern Cape Provincial Legislature
- In office 1994–2009

Personal details
- Born: 1958 or 1959 (age 66–67) Steytlerville, Cape Province, Union of South Africa
- Party: African National Congress (1990–present)
- Profession: Educator

Litho Suka (born 1958 or 1959) is a South African politician and former educator who served as a councillor of Nelson Mandela Bay from 2015 until 2021. He was chief whip of council between 2015 and 2016. Prior to serving in council, Suka was a Permanent Delegate to the National Council of Provinces from 2014 to 2015 and before that, a member of the National Assembly of South Africa from 2009 to 2014. Suka had served as a member of the Eastern Cape Provincial Legislature from 1994 until 2009. He is a member of the African National Congress.

== Early life and career ==
Suka was born in Steytlerville in what was then the Cape Province of the Union of South Africa. He has a diploma in teaching. He moved to Port Elizabeth in the 1980s and taught at a secondary school there for about 12 years.

== Political career ==
Suka became involved in politics in 1976 when he was a student. He became involved in student politics while at college. He was involved in the National Education Union of South Africa and is one of the founding members of the South African Democratic Teachers Union. Suka also participated in the United Democratic Front when the organisation was founded in 1983. Suka joined the African National Congress in 1990, shortly after it was unbanned by the white minority government.

In South Africa's first post-apartheid elections in 1994, Suka was elected to represent the ANC as a member of the newly established Eastern Cape Provincial Legislature. He was re-elected to the provincial legislature in 1999 and 2004.

Suka was elected to the lower house of the South African parliament, the National Assembly, in the 2009 general election. After South African musician Ras Dumisani's controversial performance of the South African National Anthem at a rugby test match between France and South Africa in November 2009, Suka said that it was a tragedy that Dumisani was selected to perform the national anthem and that the official at the South African embassy in Paris responsible for choosing Dumisani to perform the anthem, should face repercussions.

On 27 September 2011, Suka handed himself over to the police after he struck Nolusindiso Mazantsi who he accused of reversing into his car at a carwash in KwaZakhele, Port Elizabeth, the previous week. The following day, the office of the ANC Chief Whip, released a statement in which they mentioned that Suka had expressed deep regret for his conduct and that the Chief Whip would have a meeting with Suka at the appropriate time for a comprehensive report on the incident.

Suka was elected to represent the ANC in the National Council of Provinces as a permanent delegate from the Eastern Cape after the 2014 general elections.

On 18 May 2015, the national ANC leadership announced a complete overhaul of the Nelson Mandela Bay political leadership after the incumbent mayor Benson Fihla, who was 83-years-old at the time, was described as too old to effectively engage with communities with Danny Jordaan selected to replace Fihla as mayor and Bicks Ndoni to become deputy mayor; Suka was chosen to replace Joy Seale as chief whip of the council. He was sworn in as a councillor on 22 May 2015, a day after he had resigned his seat in the NCOP. He was elected chief whip on 28 May 2015. Suka remained in the position until after the 2016 municipal elections when a Democratic Alliance-led coalition gained control of the municipality.

Suka was appointed as the Member of the Mayoral Committee responsible safety and security after Mongameli Bobani of the United Democratic Movement was voted in as mayor of Nelson Mandela Bay on 27 August 2018. Suka did not serve in the mayoral committee for long as the regional ANC leadership wrote to Bobani in June 2019 informing him of the decision they had taken to remove Suka as a mayoral committee member to make space for Patriotic Alliance councillor Marlon Daniels to join the mayoral committee.

Suka was not included on the ANC candidate list for the Nelson Mandela Bay council prior to the 2021 municipal elections, and left council at the election.
