= Mzwandile Masala =

South African politician (1938–2023)

Member of the National Assembly
- In office 1997 – 29 June 2004
- Constituency: Eastern Cape

Personal details
- Born: Mzwandile McDonald Masala; 20 February 1938 Alice, Cape Province; Union of South Africa
- Died: 2 May 2023 (aged 85) Cape Town, Western Cape; Republic of South Africa
- Party: African National Congress

Mzwandile McDonald Masala (20 February 1938 – 2 May 2023) was a South African politician and former anti-apartheid activist. He represented the African National Congress (ANC) in the National Assembly from 1997 to 2004. He was the South African Ambassador to Zambia from 2004 to 2007.

During apartheid, Masala was active in the ANC underground in the Eastern Cape. He joined Umkhonto we Sizwe in 1962 and was arrested in 1964 for his MK activities. He spent 11 years on Robben Island and upon his release was banned. In later years, he was a founding member of the United Democratic Front, and he served as deputy provincial chairperson of the ANC's Eastern Cape branch from 1994 to 1996.

== Early life and activism ==
Masala was born on 20 February 1938 in Alice in the former Cape Province. He joined the African National Congress (ANC) at an early stage of the anti-apartheid struggle after moving to Port Elizabeth in his youth. In 1962, two years after the apartheid government banned the ANC, Masala went into exile to undergo military training with the ANC's new armed wing, Umkhonto we Sizwe (MK), in Ethiopia and Algeria. When he returned to South Africa in 1964 to carry out an MK operation in Soweto, he was arrested by the Security Branch and sentenced to 11 years' imprisonment on Robben Island.

Upon his release from prison in 1976, he was subject to a banning order which prohibited him from participating in political activities and banished him to the Ciskei bantustan. He nonetheless remained active in the ANC's underground structures and was a founding member of the United Democratic Front (UDF) in 1983. When the ANC was unbanned in 1990, he was involved in re-establishing its above-ground structures in the Eastern Cape, and he served as deputy provincial chairperson of the party's Eastern Cape branch from 1994 until 1996, when he was succeeded by Stone Sizani.

== Career in government ==
In 1997, Masala joined the National Assembly, the lower house of the post-apartheid South African Parliament, where he filled a casual vacancy. He was re-elected to full terms in 1999 and 2004, serving the Eastern Cape constituency. He resigned on 29 June 2004, ceding his seat to Peter Hendrickse.

Masala left Parliament to join the diplomatic service, serving as South African Ambassador to Zambia from 2004 to 2007.

== Retirement and death ==
After his retirement, Masala remained active in the ANC Veterans' League. In December 2012, he was among the MK members awarded military medals as members of the so-called Luthuli Detachment, the first generation of MK recruits in the 1960s. In October 2016, he was one of 101 ANC stalwarts who signed an open letter expressing concern about the direction of the ANC under President Jacob Zuma, among other things criticising the party's "departures from [its] values" and inadequate response to indications of state capture.

He died on 2 May 2023 in a hospital in Cape Town after a brief illness.
