= Bonisile Nesi =

South African politician and anti-apartheid activist (1965–2016)

Member of the National Assembly of South Africa
- In office 21 May 2014 – 3 October 2016
- Succeeded by: Beauty Dambuza
- Constituency: Eastern Cape

Permanent Delegate to the National Council of Provinces from the Eastern Cape
- In office 7 May 2009 – 6 May 2014

Personal details
- Born: 20 September 1965 Seven Fountains, Grahamstown, Cape Province, South Africa
- Died: 2 October 2016 (aged 51)
- Party: African National Congress (1982–2016)
- Spouse: Thobeka
- Children: 3
- Education: University of Cape Town (BSocSci); Rhodes University

Bonisile Alfred Nesi (20 September 1965 – 2 October 2016) was a South African politician and anti-apartheid activist. A member of the African National Congress, he was elected a Member of the Eastern Cape Provincial Legislature in 2004. He was elected to the National Council of Provinces as a permanent delegate from the Eastern Cape in 2009. From 2014 he was a member of the South African National Assembly.

== Early life and education ==
Nesi was born on 20 September 1965 to Mfondini Twani and Tandiwe Teyisi at Seven Fountains in Grahamstown in the previous Cape Province. He attended Archie Mbolekwa Primary School and Ntsika Junior Secondary School before going on to Nyaluza High School. He did not complete his studies at Nyaluza. During his time in prison in the late-1980s, he completed his matric. He graduated from the University of Cape Town in 1995 with a Bachelor of Social Sciences degree. He later earned a diploma in strategic management at Rhodes University.

== Political career ==
Nesi was recruited by the underground structures of the African National Congress in 1982. He soon established a branch of the Congress of South African Students. In 1983, he was involved with the launch of the United Democratic Front's Albany region branch and served as a student representative on the branch's regional executive committee. Nesi was arrested in 1987 for his involvement in anti-apartheid activities and was incarcerated at the St Albins Prison in Port Elizabeth for a period of three years.

Nesi was elected to the Eastern Cape Provincial Legislature in the 2004 general elections on the ticket of the ANC. He served on multiple portfolio committees during his time in the provincial legislature.

Following the 2009 general elections, Nesi was elected as an Eastern Cape permanent delegate to the National Council of Provinces, the upper house of parliament. He was a member of the Select Committee on Petitions and Members' Legislative Proposals, the Select Committee on Security and Constitutional Development as well as the Select Committee on Cooperative Governance and Traditional Affairs.

Nesi stood for election to the lower house of parliament, the National Assembly, in the 2014 general elections as 13th on the ANC's regional-to-national list and was elected and sworn in on 21 May 2014. He was appointed to serve on the Portfolio Committee on Home Affairs and the Portfolio Committee on Defence and Military Veterans in June 2014.

At the time of his death, Nesi was a member of the Regional Executive Committee (REC) of the ANC's Sarah Baartman Region. He had previously served as regional deputy chairperson and also held leadership positions in the provincial African National Congress Youth League.

== Personal life and death ==
Nesi had a wife, Thobeka, and three children. They lived in Grahamstown.

Nesi died on 2 October 2016.
