= Nqabisa Gantsho =

South African politician

Nqabisa Gantsho MP
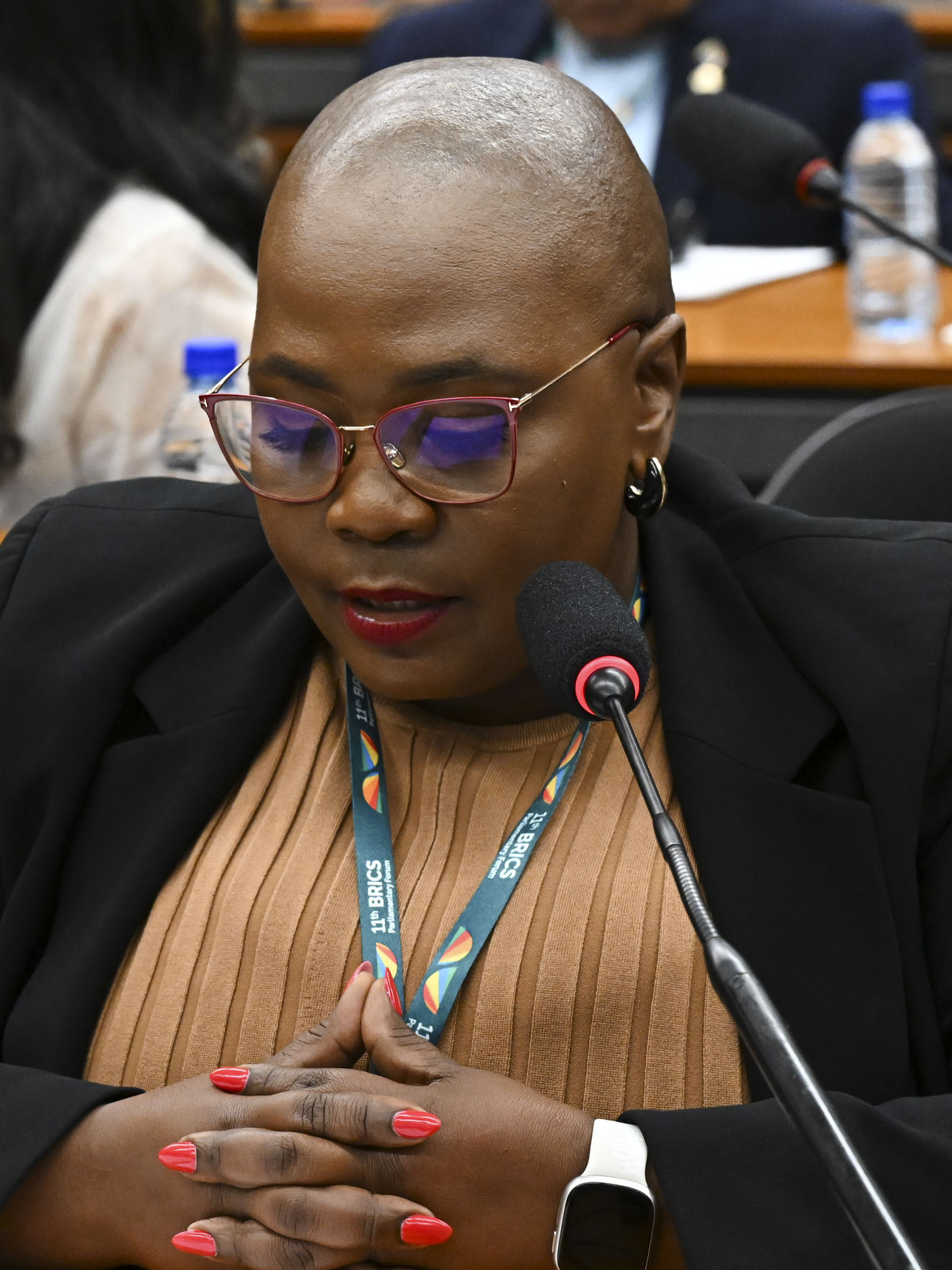
- Image of Nqabisa Gantsho

Member of the National Assembly of South Africa
- Incumbent
- Assumed office 22 May 2019
- Constituency: Eastern Cape

Personal details
- Party: African National Congress
- Occupation: Member of Parliament
- Profession: Politician

Nqabisa Gantsho is a South African politician from the Eastern Cape who has served as a Member of the National Assembly of South Africa since 2019, representing the African National Congress.

== Background ==
Gantsho holds a diploma in marketing management. A member of the African National Congress, she has been a regional executive committee member and a regional working committee member of the party's Sarah Baartman region in the Eastern Cape. She also serves on the provincial executive committee of the African National Congress Women's League.

== Parliamentary career ==
Gantsho stood for election to the South African National Assembly in the 2019 general election as ninth on the ANC's Eastern Cape regional to national list. At the election, she won a seat in parliament. Upon election, she became a member of the Portfolio Committee on Environment, Forestry and Fisheries.

Following her re-election to Parliament in the 2024 general election, Gantsho was elected to chair the Portfolio Committee on Forestry, Fisheries and Environment.
