= Mzimasi Hala =

South African politician

Mzimasi Hala MP

Member of Parliament from Eastern Cape
- Incumbent
- Assumed office 2024

Personal details
- Other political affiliations: African National Congress
- Education: Rhodes University

Mzimasi Mike Hala is a South African politician who has been a Member of Parliament (MP) for the African National Congress.

Hala holds a masters degree from Rhodes University.
