= Mncedisi Nontsele =

South African politician

Mncedisi Nontsele MP

Member of the National Assembly of South Africa
- Incumbent
- Assumed office 22 May 2019
- Constituency: Eastern Cape

Personal details
- Born: Mncedisi Nontsele; 1 June 1959 (age 66)
- Party: African National Congress
- Occupation: Member of Parliament
- Profession: Politician

Mncedisi Nontsele (born 1 June 1959) is a member of the National Assembly of South Africa. A member of the African National Congress, he was elected to parliament in 2019. Nontsele is a former mayor of the Lukhanji Local Municipality.

== Political career ==
Nontsele is a member of the African National Congress. He had served as the mayor of the Lukhanji Local Municipality in the Chris Hani District Municipality before he resigned in 2014 to head an organising committee at Calata House, the ANC's provincial headquarters. He served as the convenor of the ANC's regional task team in Nelson Mandela Bay. In August 2016, he was the keynote speaker at a Chris Hani Memorial Lecture in Grahamstown, Eastern Cape. He is currently a member of the ANC provincial executive committee.

== Parliamentary career ==
On 17 March 2019, the ANC published their candidates lists for the national and provincial elections on 8 May 2019. He was ranked 12th on the ANC's list of National Assembly candidates from the Eastern Cape. The ANC won 18 regional seats in the province and Nontsele was elected to the National Assembly. He was sworn into office on 22 May during the first meeting of the National Assembly after the election two weeks prior.

On 27 June 2019, he was named to the Portfolio Committee on Employment and Labour. On 2 February 2021, he became a member of the Portfolio Committee on Trade and Industry, replacing Tozama Mantashe of the ANC, who died. He was a member of the portfolio committee until 24 February, when he became an alternate member.

As a member of the National Assembly, he had a committee attendance rate of 94% (Attended 15 meetings out of 16) and 70% (Attended 32 meetings out of 46) for 2019 and 2020, respectively.

Nontsele was re-elected in 2024.
