= Zola Mlenzana =

South African politician

Member of the National Assembly of South Africa
- In office 22 May 2019 – 28 May 2024
- Constituency: Eastern Cape

Permanent delegate to the National Council of Provinces
- In office 7 May 2009 – 21 April 2014

Personal details
- Born: Zola Mlenzana
- Party: African National Congress (until 2008; 2014–present)
- Other political affiliations: Congress of the People (2008–2014)
- Profession: Politician

Zola Mlenzana is a South African politician. A former member of the Congress of the People, he was elected as a Permanent Delegate to the National Council of Provinces from the Eastern Cape in 2009. In 2014 he resigned from COPE and rejoined the African National Congress. Mlenzana was elected to the National Assembly in 2019.

== Political career ==
In 2008 Mlenzana joined the Congress of the People. He was a member of the African National Congress before that. After the 2009 national and provincial elections, the Eastern Cape Provincial Legislature elected him as a Permanent Delegate to the National Council of Provinces from the Eastern Cape, representing COPE. He served on the Select Committee on Labour and Public Enterprises (NCOP Committees), the Select Committee on Public Services (NCOP Committees) and the Select Committee on Land and Environmental Affairs (NCOP Committees) during the Fourth Parliament (2009–2014). Prior to the 2014 general elections, Mlenzana and many other COPE MPs resigned from COPE and rejoined the ANC.

In 2017 he was elected chairperson of an ANC branch. Mlenzana was elected chairperson of the South African National Civic Organization in the Eastern Cape in 2018.

In 2019 he stood for election to the South African National Assembly as a candidate on the ANC's Eastern Cape list. At the election, he won a seat in the Assembly. Upon election, he became a member of the Standing Committee on Appropriations and the Standing Committee on Auditor General.

Mlenzana stood for re-election in 2024 at 166nd on the ANC's national list which was too low to secure re-election.
