= Andisiwe Kumbaca =

South African politician (born 1992)

The Honourable Andisiwe Kumbaca MP

Member of the National Assembly

Assembly Member for Eastern Cape
- Incumbent
- Assumed office 14 June 2024

Personal details
- Born: 3 September 1992 (age 33)
- Citizenship: South Africa
- Party: African National Congress

Andisiwe Nangamso Kumbaca (born 3 September 1992) is a South African politician from the Eastern Cape. A member of the African National Congress (ANC), she was elected to her first term in the National Assembly in the May 2024 general election. She is a member of the national executive committee of the ANC Youth League.

== Early life ==
Kumbaca was born on 3 September 1992.

== Political career ==
At the end of August 2022, Buffalo City mayor Xola Pakati appointed Kumbaca as a member of the interim board of the Buffalo City Metropolitan Development Agency.

In July 2023 she attended the national elective congress of the ANC Youth League, held at Nasrec in Johannesburg. She was elected as a member of the league's national executive committee.

She stood as a parliamentary candidate in the May 2024 general election, ranked 16th on the ANC's party list for the Eastern Cape constituency. Pursuant to the election she joined the National Assembly, the lower house of the South African Parliament. She was appointed as a member of the Portfolio Committee on International Relations and Cooperation and Portfolio Committee on Planning, Monitoring and Evaluation.
