= Sakhumzi Somyo =

South African politician (born 1960)

Chairperson of the Standing Committee on Auditor General
- In office 2 July 2019 – 28 May 2024
- Preceded by: Nthabiseng Pauline Khunou
- Succeeded by: Wouter Wessels

Member of the National Assembly of South Africa
- In office 22 May 2019 – 28 May 2024
- Constituency: Eastern Cape

Eastern Cape MEC for Finance, Economic Development, Environment and Tourism
- In office 23 May 2014 – 9 May 2018
- Preceded by: Mcebisi Jonas
- Succeeded by: Oscar Mabuyane

Member of the Eastern Cape Provincial Legislature
- In office 21 May 2014 – 7 May 2019

Personal details
- Born: Sakhumzi Stoffels Somyo; 1960 (age 65–66)
- Party: African National Congress
- Education: Jabavu High School
- Alma mater: Cape College of Education; University of Fort Hare (BA)
- Profession: Politician

Sakhumzi Stoffels Somyo (born 1960) is a South African politician. A member of the African National Congress, he was elected to the Eastern Cape Provincial Legislature in 2014. He was then appointed as the Member of the Executive Council (MEC) responsible for the Finance, Economic Development, Environment and Tourism portfolio. In 2018, he was fired as an MEC. Somyo was elected to Parliament in 2019. Soon after, he was elected Chairperson of the Standing Committee on Auditor General. He left parliament in 2024.

== Early life and education ==
Somyo was born in 1960. He matriculated from Jabavu High School. He completed a 3-year Teacher's Diploma at the Cape College of Education in Fort Beaufort. Somyo holds a Bachelor of Arts (BA) degree and an Executive Management Certificate from the University of Fort Hare. He is busy completing his Master of Public Administration degree at Fort Hare.

== Political career ==
Somyo served as the regional chairperson of the ANC's Amathole region in the Eastern Cape. He also served as the deputy provincial chairperson of the ANC until the party's 2017 provincial conference.

=== Eastern Cape provincial government ===
In 2014, Somyo stood for the Eastern Cape Provincial Legislature as 5th on the ANC's list. He was elected to the provincial legislature as the ANC won 45 out of the 63 seats. Having entered the provincial legislature, Somyo was appointed as the Member of the Executive Council (MEC) responsible for the Finance, Economic Development, Environmental Affairs and Tourism portfolio by the newly elected premier, Phumulo Masualle. In 2015, Somyo opened the 2015 Africa Open at the East London Golf Club.

During the 2018 Provincial Budget Speech in March 2018, Somyo denounced the exodus of more than 300‚000 residents from the Eastern Cape to other provinces‚ according to the 2011 national census‚ which had resulted in a R13.9-billion cut in the province's national budget allocation since 2013. Somyo referred to the provincial budget as a "balancing budget". In May 2018, Masualle reshuffled his executive council, in which he fired Somyo and replaced him with Oscar Mabuyane.

=== Parliamentary career ===
In 2019, Somyo stood for election to the South African National Assembly as the 5th candidate on the ANC's list in the Eastern Cape. He was elected to the National Assembly at the election. Upon election, Somyo was elected chairperson of the Standing Committee on Auditor General. He also serves on the Standing Committee on Public Accounts.

In August 2021, Somyo said that some municipalities in South Africa presented an unsatisfactory picture of their financial management.

During a committee meeting of the Standing Committee on Auditor General in November 2021, Somyo said that he found it hard to believe that Eskom was functioning when rolling blackouts were frequently occurring.

Somyo did not seek reelection in 2024 and left parliament.
