= Nolitha Ntobongwana =

South African politician

Chairperson of the Portfolio Committee on Public Works and Infrastructure
- In office 2 July 2019 – 28 May 2024
- Preceded by: Committee established
- Succeeded by: Carol Phiri

Member of the National Assembly of South Africa
- In office 22 May 2019 – 28 May 2024
- Constituency: Eastern Cape

Personal details
- Born: Nolitha Ntobongwana; 22 October 1969 (age 56) Qumbu, Cape Province, South Africa
- Party: African National Congress
- Education: University of Fort Hare
- Profession: Politician

Nolitha Ntobongwana (born 22 October 1969) is a South African educator and politician. She served as the chairperson of the Portfolio Committee on Public Works and Infrastructure in the National Assembly and a member of parliament for the African National Congress from 2019 until 2024. Ntobongwana had previously served in the Eastern Cape Provincial Legislature.

== Background ==
Ntobongwana was born on 22 October 1969 in Qumbu in the Cape Province. She holds a secondary teacher's diploma and a Bachelor of Commerce in Accounting. She obtained a Masters in Public Administration from the University of Fort Hare. She has served as the deputy secretary of the South African Democratic Teachers Union (SADTU) branch in Qumbu, as the branch secretary of the ANC's Maqhutyana branch in the Mhlontlo Sub-Region in the OR Tambo Region, as the regional treasurer of the ANC's OR Tambo region, as the regional task team coordinator of the African National Congress Women's League in the OR Tambo region and as the provincial secretary of the ANC women's league in the Eastern Cape.

Ntobongwana served as an ANC councillor in the Mhlontlo Local Municipality from 2006 to 2011, and then as an ANC councillor in the OR Tambo District Municipality from 2011 to 2015. She was chief whip of the OR Tambo District Municipality during her time on the council. She also served in the Eastern Cape Provincial Legislature as an ANC representative.

== Parliamentary career ==
Ntobongwana was elected to the National Assembly in the 2019 general election from the ANC's Eastern Cape list. She is currently the Chairperson of the Portfolio Committee on Public Works and Infrastructure.

Ntobongwana did not stand in the 2024 general election and left parliament.
