= Mkhangeli Matomela =

South African politician

Member of the Eastern Cape Executive Council for Education
- In office May 2004 – January 2007
- Premier: Nosimo Balindlela
- Preceded by: Nomsa Jajula
- Succeeded by: Johnny Makgato

Speaker of the Eastern Cape Provincial Legislature
- In office 1999–2004
- Preceded by: Gugile Nkwinti
- Succeeded by: Noxolo Kiviet

Personal details
- Citizenship: South Africa
- Party: Kingdom Governance Movement (since 2013); African National Congress (until 2013)

Mkhangeli Manford Matomela is a South African politician who represented the African National Congress (ANC) in the Eastern Cape Provincial Legislature until August 2013, when he left the legislature and the party to found the breakaway Kingdom Governance Movement. He was formerly the Speaker of the Eastern Cape Provincial Legislature from 2004 to 2009 and the Eastern Cape's Member of the Executive Council (MEC) for Education from 2004 to 2007. Matomela contested the 2014 general election as a candidate for the Kingdom Governance Movement, but the party did not win any seats.

== Political career ==
Matomela was a longstanding representative of the ANC in the Eastern Cape Provincial Legislature. He served as Speaker from 1999 and, in May 2004, Premier Nosimo Balindlela appointed him to the Eastern Cape Executive Council as MEC for Education. He resigned from the Executive Council in January 2007, citing personal reasons, and was replaced as MEC by Johnny Makgato. He continued to represent the ANC in the provincial legislature until August 2013, when he resigned from the legislature and from the party to launch the Kingdom Governance Movement. At the time of his resignation, he was the chairperson of the legislature's Portfolio Committee on Finance.

The Kingdom Governance Movement was launched in Bhisho on 22 August 2013, but the Saturday Dispatch reported that Matomela had been preparing for its launch for about a year before then. Matomela said that the party would register with the Electoral Commission to contest the 2014 general election, saying, "I feel limited in the ANC and have taken a decision not to campaign for them for the upcoming elections but for the prophetic kingdom politics". The ANC said that Matomela had left "amicably" and that the party understood that it was not a suitable vehicle for Matomela's religious goals. Dingaan Myolwa filled Matomela's seat in the provincial legislature.

In the 2014 election, Matomela stood for election both to the National Assembly and to the Eastern Cape Provincial Legislature, ranked first on the Kingdom Governance Movement's party list at both levels. However, the party did not win any seats in either legislature. During the 2016 local elections, the party contested council seats in Mnquma in the Eastern Cape.
