= Lindelwa Dunjwa =

South African politician

Lindelwa Dunjwa MP

Chairperson of the Joint Multi-Party Women's Caucus
- Incumbent
- Assumed office 1 November 2024
- Preceded by: Kate Bilankulu

Chairperson of the Portfolio Committee on Women, Youth and Persons with Disabilities
- In office 10 July 2024 – 23 October 2024
- Preceded by: Claudia Ndaba
- Succeeded by: Liezl van der Merwe

Chairperson of the Portfolio Committee on Employment and Labour
- In office 2 July 2019 – 28 May 2024
- Preceded by: Position established
- Succeeded by: Boyce Maneli

Chairperson of the Portfolio Committee on Health
- In office 25 June 2014 – 7 May 2019
- Preceded by: Bevan Goqwana
- Succeeded by: Sibongiseni Dhlomo

Member of the National Assembly of South Africa
- Incumbent
- Assumed office 6 May 2009
- Constituency: Eastern Cape

Personal details
- Party: African National Congress
- Profession: Politician

Mary-Ann Lindelwa Dunjwa is a South African politician from the Eastern Cape. A member of the African National Congress, she was elected to the National Assembly in 2009. After her re-election in 2014, she became the Chairperson of the Portfolio Committee on Health, a position she held until 2019, when she was elected Chairperson of the Portfolio Committee on Employment and Labour. She was re-elected to Parliament in the 2024 general election and then elected to chair the Portfolio Committee on Women, Youth and Persons with Disabilities before she was elected chairperson of the Chairperson of the Joint Multi-Party Women's Caucus.

== Political career ==
Dunjwa is a member of the African National Congress. Prior to the 2009 general election, she was ranked 17th on the ANC's regional-to-national list. At the election, she won a seat in the National Assembly. She was a member of the Portfolio Committee on Science and Technology, a party whip, and the ANC's constituency contact for its Greenbushes constituency office during the 2009–2014 parliamentary term.

Dunjwa was significantly moved up on the ANC's regional-to-national list for the 2014 general election. She topped the list, meaning that she was easily re-elected to parliament at the election. She was then elected chairperson of the Portfolio Committee on Health. In August 2015, Dunjwa voted for a report by the Minister of Police, Nathi Nhleko that exonerated President Jacob Zuma of paying any money towards the controversial multimillion-rand upgrades at the Nkandla homestead, his private home in KwaZulu-Natal.

For the 2019 general election, Dunjwa was 6th on the ANC's regional-to-national list. She was re-elected at the election and was then elected Chairperson of the newly established Portfolio Committee on Employment and Labour.

Dunjwa was re-elected to the National Assembly in the 2024 general election. She was elected chairperson of the Portfolio Committee on Women, Youth and Persons with Disabilities afterwards. She resigned as chair of the committee in October 2024 and was elected to chair the Joint Multi-Party Women's Caucus.
