= Lindelwa Sapo =

South African politician

Sapo Lindelwa Balungile

Member of the National Assembly of South Africa
- Incumbent
- Assumed office 2024
- Constituency: Eastern Cape

Personal details
- Party: African National Congress

Lindelwa Balungile Sapo is a South African politician and member of Parliament (MP) for the African National Congress (ANC). She was elected to the National Assembly of South Africa in the 2024 South African general election. She currently serve as the member of the ANCYL NEC, ANC PET Head of communicationss and ANC PEC of the Eastern Cape. https://www.dailydispatch.co.za/politics/2025-12-17-strong-eastern-cape-showing-at-anc-youth-league-conference/ https://www.pressreader.com/south-africa/the-herald-south-africa/20260630/281586657325420?srsltid=AfmBOooLVIiK9pMryuRndDVJftYdPT55cuXswoTjkzxW1QhQurj74JtGShe graduated in UNISA with 4 qualifications which includes Masters in Public Administration which obtained last year in October https://x.com/unisa/status/1980630148341985714.

== See also ==
- List of National Assembly members of the 28th Parliament of South Africa
