= Makana Citizens Front =

Makana Citizens Front (MCF) is a South African civic movement launched on 16 June 2021 in response to a widely supported community shutdown protest in Makhanda, a constituent city of the Makana Local Municipality. In the elections of 1 November 2021, MCF won 17.38% of the ward vote and 18.86% of the proportional list vote, placing it second after the governing African National Congress.

MCF entered the race with a list of proportional representation (PR) candidates and candidates in every ward.

In their first five months in office, they claimed a string of achievements In April 2022, a renegade faction ousted the original five PR councillors, a move that was found unlawful and was overturned by the Electoral Court in May 2024.

Some achievements claimed by MCF are:

- providing evidence to the Special Investigating Unit (SIU) resulting in an investigation of corrupt tenders in Makana.
- initiating a complaint to the South African Human Rights Commission on violation of water rights.
- laid criminal charges arising from spending over R2.6-million on a pump that had not been delivered.
- delivered a petition with over 22,000 signatures demanding a national intervention in Makana's water problems to the President.
- taking up labour issues.
