= Gavin Jonas =

South African politician

Member of the National Assembly of South Africa
- In office 14 June 2024 – 1 November 2024

Personal details
- Party: Patriotic Alliance
- Profession: Politician

Gavin Franklin Jonas is a South African politician who served in the National Assembly of South Africa for the Patriotic Alliance from June until November 2024.

== Political career ==
Jonas was elected to a seat in the National Assembly of South Africa for the Patriotic Alliance in the 2024 general election. He sat on the Portfolio Committee on Forestry, Fisheries and the Environment and the Portfolio Committee on Correctional Services.

Jonas was one of a number of PA MPs who resigned from the National Assembly in late-October 2024.
