= Jackson Bici =

South African politician

Member of the Eastern Cape Provincial Legislature
- In office May 2009 – 6 May 2014

Member of the National Assembly
- In office 23 April 2004 – May 2009
- Constituency: Eastern Cape

Personal details
- Born: 26 February 1942 (age 84)
- Citizenship: South Africa
- Party: United Democratic Movement

Jackson Bici (born 26 February 1942) is a retired South African politician who represented the United Democratic Movement (UDM) in the National Assembly between 2004 and 2009. He was elected in the 2004 general election and served the Eastern Cape constituency.

In the next general election in 2009, he was elected as one of the UDM's three representatives in the Eastern Cape Provincial Legislature. He ran for re-election in 2014 but did not win a seat.
