= Nokuzola Ndongeni =

South African politician

The Honourable Nokuzola Ndongeni MP

Permanent Delegate to the National Council of Provinces
- Incumbent
- Assumed office 23 May 2019
- Constituency: Eastern Cape

Member of the National Assembly
- In office 21 May 2014 – 7 May 2019

Personal details
- Citizenship: South Africa
- Party: African National Congress

Nokuzola Ndongeni is a South African politician who has represented the African National Congress (ANC) in the National Council of Provinces (NCOP) since 2019. She is the Provincial Whip for the Eastern Cape delegation to the NCOP. Prior to her election to the NCOP in 2019, Ndongeni was a Member of the National Assembly; she was first elected to Parliament in the 2014 general election, ranked 17th on the ANC's provincial-to-national party list for the Eastern Cape.
