= Sheilla Xego =

South African politician, educator and trade unionist

Sheilla Xego MP

Member of the National Assembly of South Africa
- Incumbent
- Assumed office 2011

Personal details
- Born: Sheilla Tembalam Xego; 1 August 1960 (age 65)
- Party: African National Congress
- Children: 3
- Education: RAU, VISTA
- Occupation: Educator; Trade unionist Politician

Sheilla Tembalam Xego (born 1 August 1960) is a South African politician, educator and trade unionist from the Eastern Cape who has been a member of the National Assembly since 2011. Prior to entering parliament, she was a councillor of the Mbhashe Local Municipality from 2000 to 2006 and the Amathole District Municipality from 2006 to 2010. Xego is a member of the African National Congress.

== Early life and career ==
Xego was born on 1 August 1960. She holds a diploma in education as well as a diploma in project management. In 1976 and 1977, she became interested in politics. She began teaching in 1980 and then joined a teachers' union.

A member of the African National Congress, Xhego was a councillor in the Mbhashe Local Municipality from 2000 to 2006, when she was elected to the Amathole District Municipality's council. She served as a councillor on the district council until 2010.

== Parliamentary career ==
In 2011, Xego was sworn in as a member of the National Assembly. She was elected to a full term in the National Assembly in the 2014 general election held on 8 May. Xego then became a member of the Portfolio Committee on Transport and the Portfolio Committee on Tourism in June 2014.

In August 2015, Xego voted for a report by the Minister of Police, Nathi Nhleko, that absolved President Jacob Zuma of paying any money towards the controversial multi-million rand upgrades at the Nkandla homestead, his private home in Nkandla, KwaZulu-Natal.

In the 2019 general election, Xego was re-elected for another term in parliament. She was then appointed to serve on the Portfolio Committee on Communications and the Portfolio Committee on Tourism. She was re-elected for another term in 2024.
