= Queenie Mvana =

South African politician

Nonkosi Queenie Mvana is a South African politician. She is an African National Congress member of the Parliament of South Africa.

She is chair of the parliamentary portfolio committee on social development.
