= Ben Fihla =

South African politician

Member of the National Assembly
- In office May 1994 – 22 March 2013

Personal details
- Born: 13 June 1932 (age 93) Port Elizabeth, Cape Province; Union of South Africa
- Party: African National Congress
- Other political affiliations: South African Communist Party

Nkosinathi Benson Fihla (born 13 June 1932) is a South African politician and former anti-apartheid activist who represented the African National Congress (ANC) in the National Assembly from 1994 to 2013. He subsequently served as Mayor of the Nelson Mandela Bay Metropolitan Municipality from March 2013 until May 2015. Fihla first joined the ANC in 1954 through its Youth League and he was imprisoned on Robben Island from 1964 to 1978 for his work with Umkhonto we Sizwe.

== Early life and activism ==
Fihla was born on 13 June 1932 in Port Elizabeth in the former Cape Province. After finishing grade ten, he completed a teaching diploma at Lovedale in 1952; he also briefly attended Healdtown in 1953. While at Lovedale he attended political study groups run by students at the nearby University of Fort Hare, an ANC stronghold, and he joined the ANC Youth League in 1954.

From 1954 to 1963, Fihla worked as a cleaner at Barclays Bank in Port Elizabeth. During that time, in 1961, he joined the South African Communist Party and Umkhonto we Sizwe (MK), both of which were banned by the apartheid government. In 1963, he was found carrying firearms and arrested, and in 1964 he was sentenced to 14 years' imprisonment on Robben Island. While in prison, he completed high school and did correspondence courses through the University of South Africa.

He was released in 1978 and continued to do underground work for MK, while working as an insurance salesman and manager at Metropolitan Life. He was detained again for his political activity in the 1980s. In 1990, after the ANC was unbanned by the government, Fihla chaired the party's new above-ground branch in the Eastern Cape.

== Post-apartheid political career ==
In South Africa's first post-apartheid elections in 1994, Fihla was elected to represent the ANC in the National Assembly, the lower house of the new South African Parliament. He served as a backbencher in the National Assembly for almost four legislative terms, representing the Eastern Cape constituency. He resigned from Parliament on 22 March 2013 when he was elected as Executive Mayor of Nelson Mandela Bay Metropolitan Municipality.

In May 2015, the ANC announced that Fihla would resign in order to cede the mayoral office to Danny Jordaan ahead of the 2016 local elections. Later that year, he was appointed as a special adviser to Phumulo Masualle, the Premier of the Eastern Cape.
