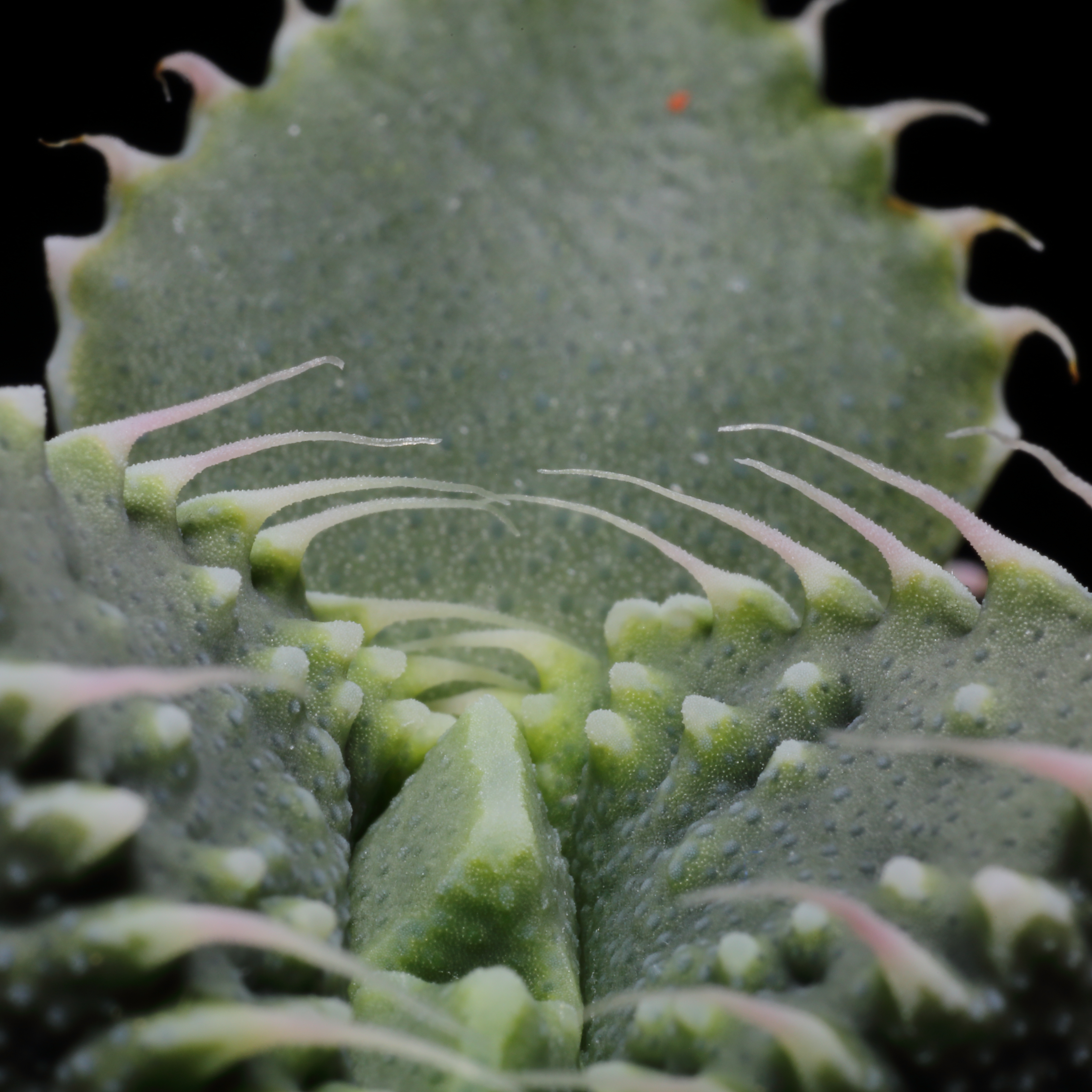
- Close-up of leaves
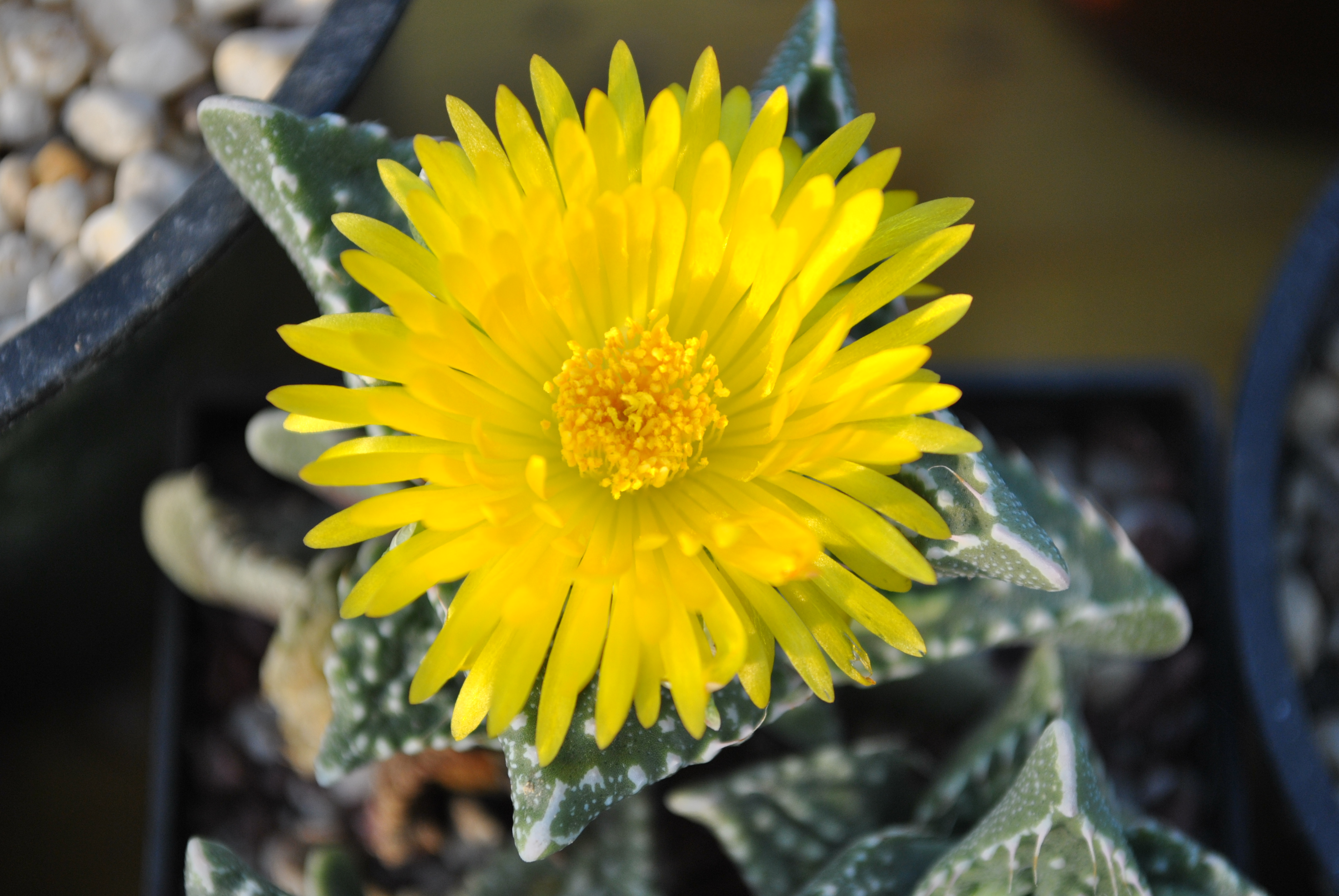
- Flower

Scientific classification
- Kingdom: Plantae
- Clade: Embryophytes
- Clade: Tracheophytes
- Clade: Angiosperms
- Clade: Eudicots
- Order: Caryophyllales
- Family: Aizoaceae
- Genus: Faucaria
- Species: F. tuberculosa

Binomial name
- Faucaria tuberculosa (Rolfe) Schwantes

Synonyms
- Faucaria felina subsp. tuberculosa (Rolfe) L.E.Groen; Mesembryanthemum tuberculosum Rolfe

= Faucaria tuberculosa =

Species of flowering plant

Faucaria tuberculosa, called warty tiger jaws, is a species of flowering plant in the genus Faucaria, native to southern Cape Provinces of South Africa. A succulent, it has gained the Royal Horticultural Society's Award of Garden Merit.
