= Annette Steyn =

South African politician

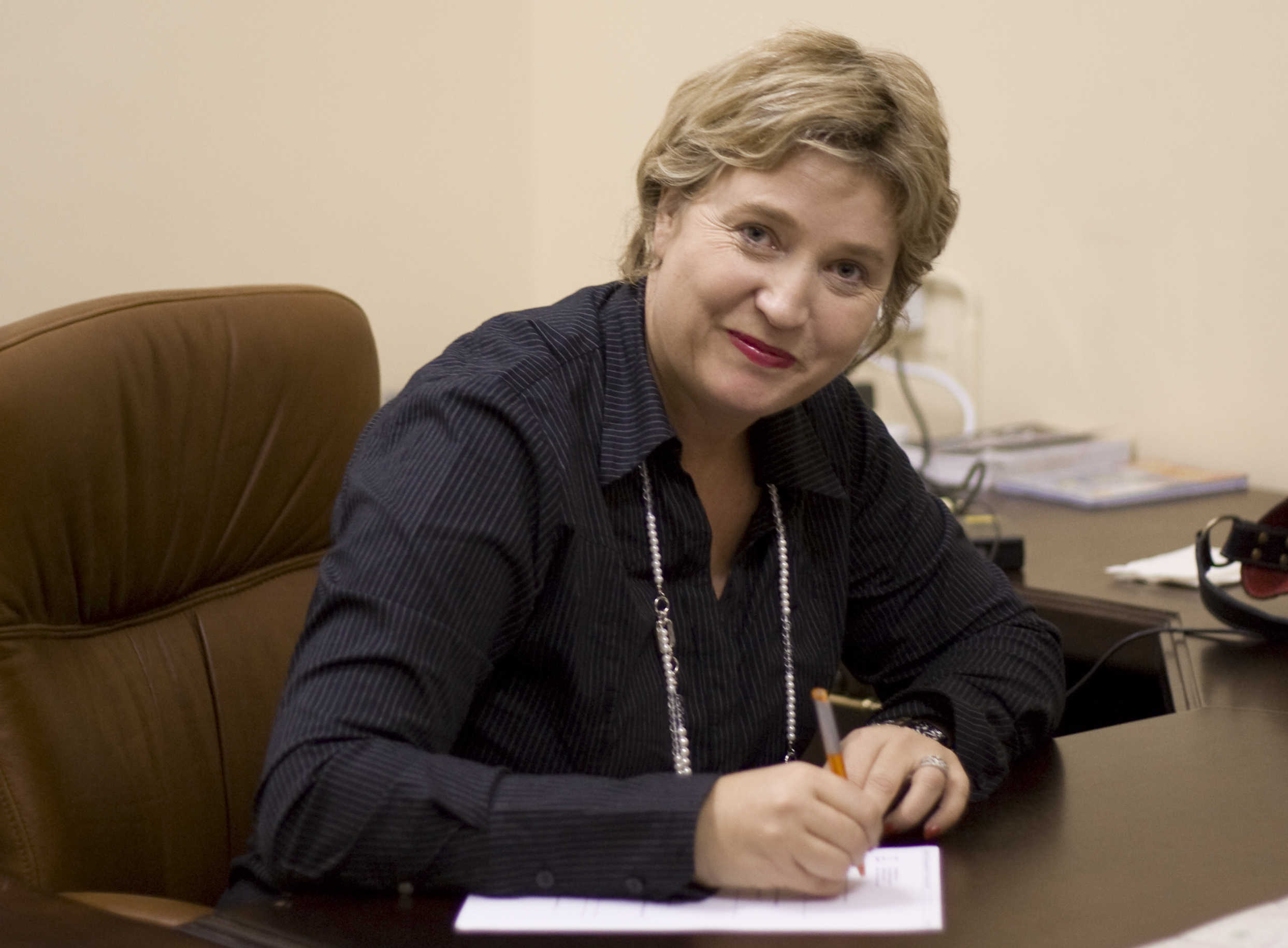
- Steyn in 2009

Shadow Minister of Agriculture, Land Reform and Rural Development
- In office 5 June 2019 – 30 June 2022
- Leader: John Steenhuisen; Mmusi Maimane
- Preceded by: Office established
- Succeeded by: Phineas Masipa

Shadow Minister of Agriculture, Forestry and Fisheries
- In office 1 February 2012 – 5 June 2019
- Leader: Mmusi Maimane; Lindiwe Mazibuko
- Preceded by: Lourie Bosman
- Succeeded by: Office abolished

Shadow Deputy Minister of Rural Development and Land Reform
- In office 14 May 2009 – 1 February 2012
- Leader: Lindiwe Mazibuko; Athol Trollip
- Preceded by: Unknown
- Succeeded by: Kevin Mileham

Member of the National Assembly of South Africa
- In office 6 May 2009 – 30 June 2022

Personal details
- Born: 2 June 1969 (age 57)
- Party: Democratic Alliance
- Occupation: Politician

Annette Steyn (born 2 June 1969) is a South African retired politician, formerly a Member of the National Assembly for the official opposition Democratic Alliance (DA). Steyn was first elected to Parliament in 2009 and served in the Shadow Cabinet in various positions. She was also at one stage the DA Eastern Cape Provincial Chairperson.

== Political career ==
Steyn previously served as a municipal councillor of the former Gariep Local Municipality in the Eastern Cape, before her election to the National Assembly in 2009. She took office as a Member on 6 May 2009. Shortly afterwards on 14 May 2009, the DA Parliamentary Leader, Athol Trollip, appointed her to the post of Shadow Deputy Minister of Rural Development and Land Reform.

In February 2012, the newly elected DA Parliamentary Leader Lindiwe Mazibuko named Steyn as the new Shadow Minister of Agriculture, Forestry and Fisheries, succeeding incumbent Lourie Bosman. Kevin Mileham succeeded her as Shadow Deputy Minister of the Rural Development and Land Reform portfolio. Following the 2014 elections, DA Parliamentary Leader, Mmusi Maimane, kept Steyn in her position.

In her capacity as a Shadow Minister, Steyn has suggested that the national government should provide drought relief to struggling Northern Cape farmers. She called for the Land Bank to allocate agricultural land to emerging black farmers. She proposed an SIU Investigation into corruption allegations at the Department of Agriculture. Steyn claimed in 2018 that a total of 85,000 jobs in the South African sugar industry were being marginalised.

In June 2019, following her re-election, Steyn was named Shadow Minister of Agriculture, Land Reform and Rural Development by Mmusi Maimane. Following John Steenhuisen's election as leader of the DA, he appointed her to his shadow cabinet in the same position.

On 15 June 2022, Steyn announced her retirement from politics to spend more time with her family. She resigned as an MP on 30 June 2022.

Political offices
Preceded by Office esblished	Shadow Minister of Agriculture, Land Reform and Rural Development; 2019–2022	Succeeded by Vacant
Preceded by Lourie Bosman	Shadow Minister of Agriculture, Forestry and Fisheries; 2012–2019	Succeeded by Office abolished
Preceded by Not known	Shadow Deputy Minister of Rural Development and Land Reform; 2009–2012	Succeeded by Kevin Mileham
