= Makho Njobe =

South African politician (born 1930)

Member of the National Assembly
- In office 6 May 2009 – 6 May 2014
- Constituency: Eastern Cape
- In office 9 May 1994 – January 2009

Personal details
- Born: 13 May 1930 (age 96)
- Citizenship: South Africa
- Party: Congress of the People (since January 2009)
- Other political affiliations: African National Congress (until January 2009)
- Education: University College of Fort Hare

Makhosazana Abigail Alicia "Makho" Njobe (born 13 May 1930) is a South African politician who served in the National Assembly from 1994 to 2014, excepting a brief hiatus in 2009. She represented the African National Congress (ANC) until January 2009, when she defected to the breakaway Congress of the People (COPE). She represented COPE for her final term from 2009 to 2014. From 2009 onwards, she served the Eastern Cape constituency.

A science teacher by profession, Njobe was a veteran of the ANC, which she joined while living in exile during apartheid. During her exile, she taught at schools in Ghana, Tanzania, and Zambia, among them the ANC's Solomon Mahlangu Freedom College. She was active in the women's section of the exiled ANC and later in the ANC Women's League.

== Early life and career ==
Njobe was born on 13 May 1930. Her sister is Peggy Luswazi, who later became an academic.

Njobe completed a bachelor of science and teaching diploma at the University College of Fort Hare, majoring in zoology and chemistry, and worked as a science teacher at a secondary school. Although she continued to teach after the advent of the Bantu Education Act in 1953, she and her husband emigrated in 1957 to Ghana, which had just become the first sub-Saharan African country to win its independence from colonial rule.

They went on to teach in Nigeria until interrupted by the Biafran war, and later in Tanzania and Zambia, where they came into contact with the African National Congress (ANC), then an anti-apartheid organisation operating in exile while banned inside South Africa. Njobe's husband, Makhunga Wintshi Njobe, became the inaugural principal of the secondary school at the ANC's Solomon Mahlangu Freedom College. Njobe herself joined the ANC and was a member of its women's section, the immediate predecessor of the present-day ANC Women's League.

== Parliament: 1994–2014 ==
=== African National Congress: 1994–2009 ===
In South Africa's first post-apartheid elections in 1994, Njobe was elected to represent the ANC in the National Assembly, the lower house of the new South African Parliament. She represented the ANC in the assembly until 2009, gaining re-election in 1999 and 2004; from 2004 onwards, she represented the Eastern Cape constituency. From March 2004, she served concurrently as one of the assembly's five delegates to the newly established Pan-African Parliament.

In a reshuffle of the ANC's caucus in April 2002, the party nominated Njobe to chair the Portfolio Committee on Arts and Culture. She was initially retained in that position after the 2004 election but was replaced by Lech Tsenoli in another reshuffle in June 2004. She also remained active in the ANC Women's League: in 2003, she was the chief electoral commissioner in a fierce contest, between Nosiviwe Mapisa-Nqakula and Thandi Modise, over the league's presidency.

==== Business interests ====
In 1997, the Mail & Guardian reported that Njobe and several other senior ANC members were joint owners of Dyambu Trust, created in April 1996 to pursue investments, particularly in mining, whose profits could be used for community development projects. The only two official trustees were Nomvula Mokonyane and Lindiwe Maseko; other women involved included Baleka Kgositsile, Lindiwe Sisulu, Adelaide Tambo, Lindiwe Zulu, Nosiviwe Mapisa-Nqakula, and Nomatyala Hangana. According to the Mail & Guardian, Dyambu Trust owned the site of Lindela Repatriation Centre, a privately owned deportation camp on the West Rand. Two decades later, journalist Adriaan Basson reported that Gavin Watson had joined Dyambu Trust in 1997 and had ultimately taken control of it, turning it into Bosasa.

In September 2004, another Mail & Guardian exposé named Njobe as one of several MPs who had failed to disclose financial interests as required by parliamentary rules. The newspaper said that Njobe – along with her colleagues Lulu Xingwana, Nonkumbi Gxowa, and Makwena Ngwenya – had an interest in Malibongwe, a non-profit company that invested in charitable development interests, including as a participant in a recent R860-million black economic empowerment mining deal. In November, Parliament's ethics committee cleared Njobe of any wrongdoing, finding that she was not required to disclose a directorship in a non-profit.

=== Congress of the People: 2009–2014 ===
In January 2009, Njobe resigned from the ANC to join the Congress of the People (COPE), a recently formed breakaway party. Her defection was announced at COPE's election manifesto launch in Port Elizabeth, several months ahead of the 2009 general election. She lost her seat in Parliament upon leaving the ANC. However, she returned after the 2009 election, representing COPE in the Eastern Cape constituency. She left Parliament after the next general election in 2014.

During her final term in Parliament, Njobe also chaired an internal COPE disciplinary committee which, in 2010, dismissed sexual harassment charges against Willie Madisha, a close political ally of COPE president Mosiuoa Lekota. The deputy chairperson of COPE's women's wing, Zale Madonsela, said that the disciplinary process was procedurally flawed, showed a "total disregard and disrespect for women", and had been "appointed to serve factional interests".
