= Kingdom Governance Movement =

Political party in South Africa

- Founder: Mkhangeli Matomela
- Founded: 2013
- Ideology: Christian democracy Homophobia; Conservatism; Christian right
- Political position: Right-wing to far-right

The Kingdom Governance Movement is a minor political party in South Africa.

== History ==
Formed in 2013 by former African National Congress (ANC) chairperson of the finance committee in the Eastern Cape, Mkhangeli Matomela, the party aims to bring about what it terms "God-centred politics".

At the party's launch, Matomela said that the ANC would be "rejected by God" for accepting homosexuality, and described the ANC, Desmond Tutu and the South African and World Council of Churches part of a global "anti-christ" movement. He spoke of a "demonic invasion" by the "New Age Movement" and claimed that his party would save the country from the "anti-Christ system".

The party won no seats in the 2014 elections.

== Election results ==
=== National elections ===
Election	Votes	%	Seats
2014	6,408	0.03	0

=== Provincial elections ===
Election	Eastern Cape		Gauteng		Kwazulu-Natal		Western Cape
Election	%	Seats	%	Seats	%	Seats	%	Seats
2014	0.18	0/63	0.02	0/73	0.05	0/80	0.02	0/42
