= Busisiwe Tshwete =

South African politician

Member of the National Assembly of South Africa
- In office 22 May 2019 – 28 May 2024
- Constituency: Eastern Cape

Personal details
- Born: Busisiwe Tshwete; 7 May 1981 (age 45)
- Party: African National Congress
- Occupation: Politician

Busisiwe Tshwete (born 7 May 1981) is a South African politician and a former Member of the National Assembly of South Africa for the African National Congress (ANC).

Tshwete was elected to the National Assembly in the 2019 South African general election.

She was a member of the National Assembly's Portfolio Committee on Agriculture, Land Reform and Rural Development.
