= Sylvia Sigcau =

South African politician (born 1946)

Member of the National Assembly
- In office April 2004 – May 2009

Personal details
- Born: 3 November 1946 (age 79)
- Citizenship: South Africa
- Party: United Democratic Movement

Sylvia Nomatamsanqa Sigcau (born 3 November 1946) is a South African politician who was a Member of the National Assembly for a single term from 2004 to 2009. A member of the United Democratic Movement (UDM), she was one of the party's three representatives in the Eastern Cape caucus of the National Assembly.

In the 2009 general election, Sigcau was nominated to stand for re-election, but she was not ranked high enough on the UDM's party list to gain a seat.
