= Priscilla Tozama Mantashe =

South African politician (1960–2021)

Tozama Mantashe

Member of the National Assembly of South Africa
- In office 21 May 2014 – 31 January 2021
- Constituency: Eastern Cape

Personal details
- Born: 23 October 1960
- Died: 31 January 2021 (aged 60)
- Cause of death: COVID-19 complications
- Party: African National Congress
- Relatives: Gwede Mantashe (brother)
- Occupation: Politician

Priscilla Tozama Mantashe (23 October 1960 – 31 January 2021) was a South African politician from the Eastern Cape. A member of South Africa's governing party, the African National Congress, she served as a Member of the National Assembly of South Africa from 2014 until her death in 2021. She was the sister of Gwede Mantashe, the ANC's national chairperson and the Minister of Mineral Resources and Energy.

== Background ==
Mantashe was born on 23 October 1960. She was the sister of Gwede Mantashe, who is the national chairperson of the African National Congress and the Minister of Mineral Resources and Energy. She served on the ANC's provincial executive committee in the Eastern Cape from 2010 to 2014. Mantashe was also the provincial chairperson of the National Education, Health and Allied Workers' Union before she became the second vice president of the trade union responsible for international work.

== Parliamentary career ==
In 2014, she stood for election to the South African National Assembly as the sixth candidate on the ANC's list of Eastern Cape parliamentary candidates. After the election, she was allocated a seat in the National Assembly. During her first term in parliament, she was a member of the Portfolio Committee on Trade and Industry, the Portfolio Committee on Economic Development and the Portfolio Committee on Labour. In November 2017, she was "verbally attacked" by fellow ANC MP Mervyn Dirks.

Prior to the 8 May 2019 general election, she was given the 8th position on the ANC's province to national list. She was re-elected at the election. Mantashe was sworn in for her second term on 22 May 2019. On 27 June, she became a member of the Portfolio Committee on Trade and Industry. Mantashe was named to the Rules Committee on 7 October 2019.

== Death ==
Mantashe died on 31 January 2021, from COVID-19 complications during the COVID-19 pandemic in South Africa. She had been hospitalised for weeks. A virtual memorial service was held for her on 3 February. On 10 February, the ANC announced that her seat in the National Assembly will be filled by Prince Zolile Burns-Ncamashe.

== See also ==
- List of members of the National Assembly of South Africa who died in office
