= Makana Local Municipality =

Coordinates: 33°17′S 26°31′E

Makana
- Local municipality
- Seal

- Location in the Eastern Cape
- Country: South Africa
- Province: Eastern Cape
- District: Sarah Baartman
- Seat: Makhanda
- Wards: 13

Government
  - Type: Municipal council

Area
  - Total: 4,376 km^{2} (1,690 sq mi)

Population (2022)
  - Total: 97,815
  - Density: 22.35/km^{2} (57.89/sq mi)

Racial makeup (2022)
  - African: 69.8%
  - Coloured: 12.5%
  - Indian/Asian: 0.9%
  - White: 11.3%

First languages (2011)
  - Xhosa: 71.5%
  - Afrikaans: 14.8%
  - English: 10.5%
  - Other: 3.2%
- Time zone: UTC+2 (SAST)
- Municipal code: EC104

Makana Municipality (Xhosa: uMasipala wase Makana; Afrikaans: Makana Munisipaliteit) is a local municipality which governs the town of Makhanda and surrounding areas in the Eastern Cape province of South Africa. It forms part of the Sarah Baartman District Municipality. The municipality is named after a Xhosa prophet and leader, Makana.

== Main places ==
The 2011 census divided the municipality into the following main places:

Place	Code	Population	Area (km^{2})	Most spoken language
Alicedale	264005	1,932	3.9	Afrikaans
Makhanda	264004	50,217	62.7	Xhosa
KwaNonzwakazi	264006	1,940	0.8	Xhosa
Rhini	264003	17,047	2.4	Xhosa
Riebeek East	264001	753	22.5	Xhosa
Sidbury	264007	115	7.9	Xhosa
Non-urban areas	264002	8,386	4,275.5	Xhosa
Total		80,390	4,375.6	Xhosa

== Politics ==
The municipal council consists of twenty-five members elected by mixed-member proportional representation. Thirteen councillors are elected by first-past-the-post voting in thirteen wards, while the remaining twelve are chosen from party lists so that the total number of party representatives is proportional to the number of votes received.

In the election of 4 November 2026 the African National Congress (ANC) lost its majority, but won a plurality of majority of ten seats.

The following table shows the results of the election.

Party	Ward			List			Total seats
Party	Votes	%	Seats	Votes	%	Seats	Total seats
African National Congress	7,359	31.22	10	7,296	31.32	0	10
Democratic Alliance	6,371	27.03	3	6,394	27.45	3	6
Makana United Civic Movement	4,692	19.90	0	4,453	19.12	4	4
Economic Freedom Fighters	1,404	5.96	0	1,387	5.95	1	1
South African Communist Party	1,276	5.41	0	1,317	5.65	1	1
Patriotic Alliance	766	3.25	0	727	3.12	1	1
Makana Citizens Front	633	2.69	0	641	2.75	1	1
ActionSA	397	1.68	0	495	2.13	1	1
Independent candidates	74	0.31	0				0
5 other parties	600	2.55	0	584	2.51	0	0
Total	23,572	100.00	13	23,294	100.00	12	25
Valid votes	23,572	98.18		23,294	97.84		
Invalid/blank votes	436	1.82		514	2.16		
Total votes	24,008	100.00		23,808	100.00		
Registered voters/turnout	47,092	50.98		47,092	50.56		

== Friendship Co-operation Agreement ==
In February 2011, Makana Municipality entered into a "Friendship Co-operation Agreement" with Raseborg Municipality in Finland. The project, which is to last three years, seeks to facilitate information sharing in the fields of economic development, arts & culture, women development, youth development, and education.

== Provincial Administration ==
On 28 August 2014 the Municipality was placed under administration in response to financial and infrastructural crises. The interim administration order, made in terms of section 139(1)(b) of the South African Constitution, is expected to be reviewed after three months. Shortly after the administration order was announced, news of a damning forensic report — the Kabuso report — naming several municipal officials purported to be involved in financial impropriety was made public.

=== Dissolution ===
In 2014 the city council was placed under administration by the courts for three months. This was due to its financial instability and inability to provide basic services. This intervention was not successful and on 14 January 2020, the Eastern Cape High Court dissolved the municipal council. The municipality will subsequently head to fresh elections. The Makhanda High Court made legal history by ordering the Makana Municipal Council to be dissolved. The court ruled that its ongoing failure to provide services to the residents of Makhanda was unconstitutional.

Residents of Makhanda have widely welcomed a high court ruling that the Makana Municipal Council must be dissolved over its unconstitutional failure to provide services. It was the first such order by a court in South Africa. “This judgment sparks hope. We couldn’t live like this any more. We are very happy,” said Ayanda Kota, the founder of the Unemployed People's Movement, the organisation that brought the application.

=== Maladministration ===
As of January 2024, the municipality is again under administration, one of 32 in the country, and three in the Eastern Cape where the provincial executive has intervened due to maladministration
