= Riebeek East =

Riebeek East Riebeek-Oos
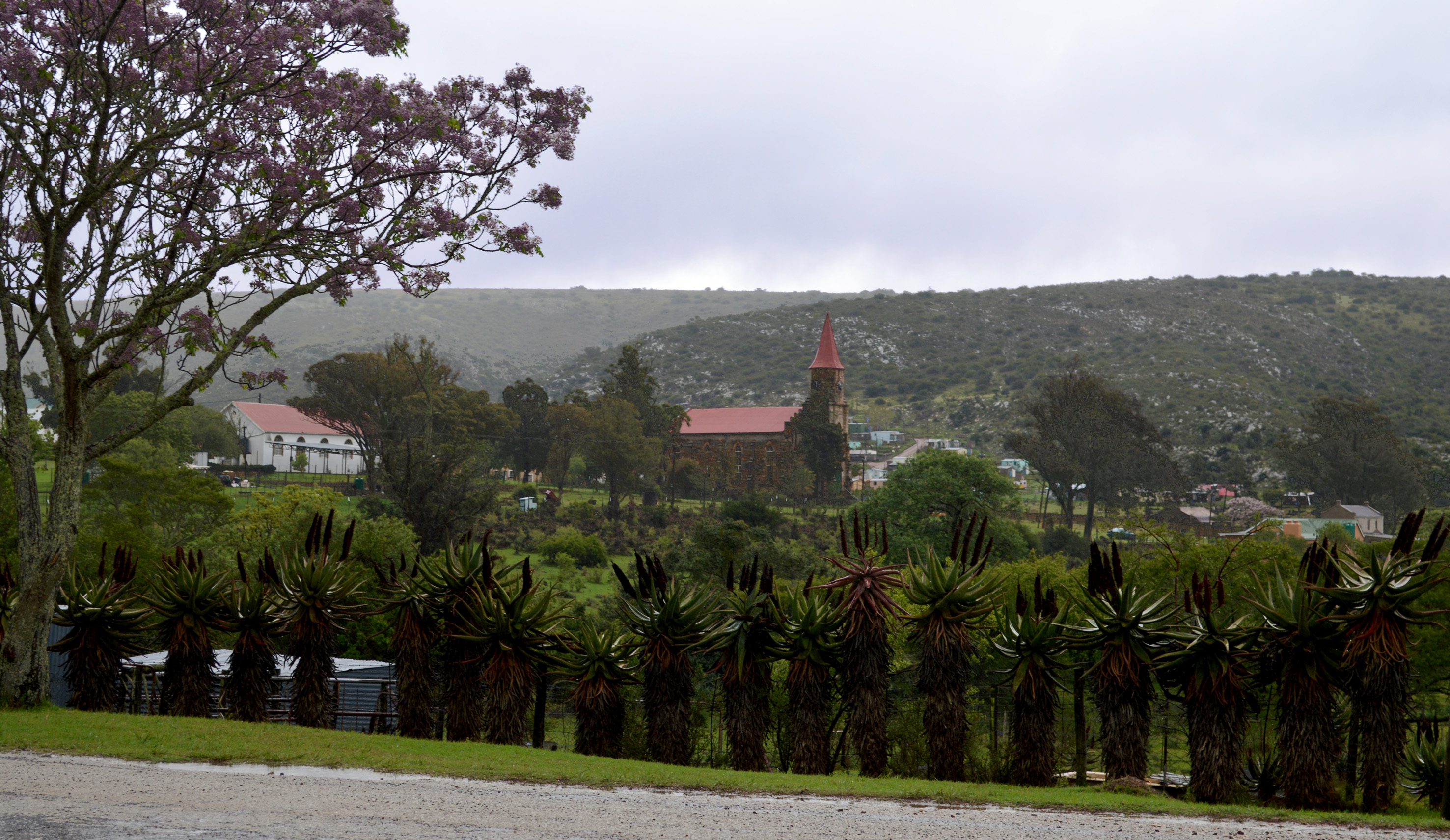
- Riebeek East

- Location within Eastern Cape Location within South Africa
- Coordinates: 33°12′S 26°09′E
- Country: South Africa
- Province: Eastern Cape
- District: Sarah Baartman
- Municipality: Makana

Area
  - Total: 22.46 km^{2} (8.67 sq mi)

Population (2011)
  - Total: 753
  - Density: 33.5/km^{2} (86.8/sq mi)

Racial makeup (2011)
  - Black African: 65.9%
  - Coloured: 26.6%
  - Indian/Asian: 0.1%
  - White: 7.3%
  - Other: 0.1%

First languages (2011)
  - Xhosa: 63.8%
  - Afrikaans: 32.3%
  - English: 2.9%
  - Other: 0.9%
- Time zone: UTC+2 (SAST)
- Postal code (street): 5805
- PO box: 5805

Riebeek East (Afrikaans: Riebeek-Oos) is a village in the Eastern Cape province of South Africa, set 39 km west of Grahamstown. It is located in a hilly area, in the midst of game and sheep farming regions. It was founded in 1842, and initially named Riebeek after Jan van Riebeeck, one year after the local church was built. It was erected on a part of the farm Mooimeisjesfontein, that was subdivided and sold by the subsequent voortrekker leader Piet Retief.

A settlement appeared around the church congregation after it was established here in 1830 by the Dutch Reformed Church. Since 1826 the local farmers applied to the colonial government to form a local congregation, as they previously had to travel to Uitenhage, 130 km distant, to attend communion services.

Retief's farm house is situated just east of the village, and has been declared a National heritage site.
