= List of members of the 6th Eastern Cape Provincial Legislature =

6th Eastern Cape Provincial Legislature
←	5th Legislature	7th Legislature	→

Overview
- Legislative body: Eastern Cape Provincial Legislature
- Jurisdiction: Eastern Cape, South Africa
- Term: 22 May 2019 – 28 May 2024
- Election: 8 May 2019
- Government: Executive Council of Oscar Mabuyane
- Members: 63
- Speaker: Helen Sauls-August
- Deputy Speaker: Mlibo Qoboshiyane
- Premier: Oscar Mabuyane
- Leader of the Opposition: Bobby Stevenson (since 2023)
- Party control: African National Congress

This is a list of members of the sixth Eastern Cape Provincial Legislature as elected in the election of 8 May 2019 and taking into account changes in membership since the election. Pursuant to the 2019 election, the African National Congress (ANC) retained its comfortable majority in the legislature, winning 44 of 63 seats. During the legislature's first sitting on 22 May 2019, Oscar Mabuyane of the ANC was elected as Premier of the Eastern Cape.

The Democratic Alliance (DA), with 10 seats, retained its status as the official opposition in the legislature. Also represented are the Economic Freedom Fighters, with five seats; the United Democratic Movement (UDM), with two seats; and the African Transformation Movement (ATM) and Freedom Front Plus (FF+) with one seat apiece. The Congress of the People and the African Independent Congress both lost their representation in the legislature, failing to win any seats in the 2019 election. The legislature dissolved on 28 May 2024, the day before the 2024 provincial election.

== Composition ==
This is a graphical comparison of party strengths as they stand in the sixth Eastern Cape Provincial Legislature.

- Note this is not the official seating plan of the Eastern Cape Provincial Legislature.

Party	Seats
African National Congress	44
DA	10
Economic Freedom Fighters	5
United Democratic Movement	2
African Transformation Movement	1
Freedom Front Plus	1
Total	63

== Members ==
Name	Party
Kesava Pillai Anilkumar	ANC
Fundisile Bese	ANC
Virginia Camealio-Benjamin	ANC
Mxolisi Dimaza	ANC
Mluleki Dlelanga	ANC
Tony Duba	ANC
Bukiwe Fanta	ANC
Koliswa Fihlani	ANC
Fundile Gade	ANC
Tumeka Gaya	ANC
Sindiswa Gomba	ANC
Mandlakazi Keleku	ANC
Nonceba Kontsiwe	ANC
Nomasikizi Konza	ANC
Babalwa Lobishe	ANC
Siphokazi Mani-Lusithi	ANC
Vumile Lwana	ANC
Oscar Mabuyane	ANC
Loyiso Magqashela	ANC
Xolani Malamlela	ANC
Nontutuzelo Maqubela	ANC
Thabo Matiwane	ANC
Sweetness Mbonyana	ANC
Nomakhosazana Meth	ANC
Mzoleli Mrara	ANC
Mlungisi Mvoko	ANC
Mziwonke Ndabeni	ANC
Pumelele Ndamase	ANC
Fezeka Nkomonye-Bayeni	ANC
Ntombovuyo Nkopane	ANC
Xolile Nqatha	ANC
Nozibele Nyalambisa	ANC
Nonkqubela Pieters	ANC
Nomvula Ponco	ANC
Mlibo Qoboshiyane	ANC
Zinzi Rabe	ANC
Helen Sauls-August	ANC
Mpumelelo Saziwa	ANC
Monde Sondaba	ANC
Weziwe Tikana	ANC
Makhaya Twabu	ANC
Koliswa Vimbayo	ANC
Zolile Williams	ANC
Tamara Xhanti	ANC
Nqaba Bhanga	DA
Kobus Botha	DA
Yusuf Cassim	DA
Jane Cowley	DA
Horatio Hendricks	DA
Vicky Knoetze	DA
Sanele Magaqa	DA
Bobby Stevenson	DA
Marshall von Buchenroder	DA
Nomvano Zibonda	DA
Bulelwa Dial	EFF
Simthembile Madikizela	EFF
Portia Qotoyi	EFF
Zilindile Vena	EFF
Litha Law Zibula	EFF
Felix Mahlati	UDM
Noncedo Zinti	UDM
Nelson Mampofu	ATM
Jaco Burger	FF+

== Former members ==
There were several mid-term changes to the composition of the ANC caucus. Nomvula Ponco, ranked 45th on the ANC's party list, was sworn in shortly after the election in June 2019, after initially failing to gain a seat. In August 2019, Kesava Pillai Anilkumar filled the vacancy created by the death of Ncediwe Nobevu-Booi in July, and in August 2022, Zolile Williams was sworn in to replace Babalo Madikizela, who resigned.

On the opposition benches, Democratic Alliance provincial leader Nqaba Bhanga resigned from the legislature in March 2020 to serve as Mayor of Nelson Mandela Bay; his seat was filled by Kobus Botha. Bhanga returned to the legislature in December 2021, succeeding Botha. In August 2022, Retief Odendaal resigned, also to serve as Mayor of Nelson Mandela Bay and was replaced by Kobus Botha. Edmund van Vuuren resigned from the provincial legislature in April 2023, and his seat was taken up by former Kouga mayor Horatio Hendricks. The Freedom Front's sole representative in the legislature, Theo Coetzee, died in January 2023 and was replaced by Jaco Burger the following month. Also in February 2023, Simthembile Madikizela and Zilindile Vena were sworn in to the legislature to represent the Economic Freedom Fighters, filling vacancies occasioned by the resignations of Mlamli Makhetha and Yazini Tetyana.

In December 2023, former DA provincial leader Nqaba Bhanga's party membership was terminated; Leander Kruger was appointed to take up his seat.
