= List of members of the 7th Eastern Cape Provincial Legislature =

Since 14 June 2024, the Eastern Cape Provincial Legislature, the unicameral legislature of the Eastern Cape province of South Africa, has consisted of 72 members from seven different political parties. The legislature's total number of seats was enlarged from 63 to 72, in line with South Africa's constitution and the Electoral Act as well as the 2022 census data.

The ruling African National Congress retained its majority and gained one seats in the legislature in the provincial election. The official opposition, the Democratic Alliance, also gained one seat. The Economic Freedom Fighters gained three seats, while the United Democratic Movement gained one seat. The Patriotic Alliance and uMkhonto weSizwe gained representation in the legislature, winning two seats and one seat, respectively. The Freedom Front Plus and African Transformation Movement both retained their sole seat in the legislature.

== Members ==
This is lists of members of the legislature, as of late-2025:

Name	Party	Position
Sibongile Aloni	EFF	Member
Kesava Pillai Anilkumar	ANC	Member
David Bese	ANC	Member
Bukeka Bodoza	EFF	Member
Yanga Bonga	ANC	Member
Ntandokazi Capa	ANC	Member
Virginia Camealio-Benjamin	ANC	Member
Yusuf Cassim	DA	Member
Jane Cowley	DA	Member
Tony Duba	ANC	Chairperson of Committees
Marlene Ewers	DA	Member
Bukiwe Fanta	ANC	Member
Malcom Figg	DA	Member
Koliswa Fihlani	ANC	Deputy Chief Whip
Fundile Gade	ANC	Member
Lennox Bogen Gaehler	UDM	Member
Tumeka Gaya	ANC	Member
Wongama Gela	ANC	Member
Ntobizodwa Gqirana	ANC	Member
Lindiwe Gunuza-Nkwentsha	ANC	Member
Tiphany Harmse	PA	Member
Vuyo Jali	ANC	Deputy Speaker
Mandlakazi Keleku	ANC	Member
Chantel King	DA	Member
Vicky Knoetze	DA	Leader of the Official Opposition
Nonceba Kontsiwe	ANC	Member
Nomasikizi Konza	ANC	Member
Leander Kruger	DA	Member
Anele Lizo	ANC	Member
Siphokazi Lusithi	ANC	Member
Oscar Mabuyane	ANC	Premier
Simthembile Madikizela	EFF	Member
Loyiso Magqashela	ANC	Chief Whip
Nelson Mampofu	ATM	Member
Patricia Mankahla	ANC	Member
Nontutuzelo Maqubela	ANC	Member
Thabo Matiwane	ANC	Member
Sigqibokazi Mbonyana	ANC	Member
Mkululi Mcotsho	UDM	Member
Piet Mey	FF+	Member
Avela Mjajubana	ANC	Member
Nokuthula Mlokoti	EFF	Member
Kabelo Mogatosi	DA	Member
Lona Mpini	EFF	Member
Heinrich Muller	DA	Member
Mlungisi Mvoko	ANC	Member
Sibulele Ngongo	ANC	Member
Siyabonga Nhanha	ANC	Member
Zikhona Njoli	EFF	Member
Xolile Nqatha	ANC	Member
Nozibele Nyalambisa	ANC	Deputy Chairperson of Committees
Retief Odendaal	DA	Member
Nonkqubela Pieters	ANC	Member
Alice Ponco	ANC	Member
Juan-Pierre Pretorius	ANC	Member
Mlibo Qoboshiyane	ANC	Member
Portia Qotoyi	EFF	Member
Mawethu Rune	ANC	Member
Helen Sauls-August	ANC	Speaker
Mpumelelo Saziwa	ANC	Member
Monde Sondaba	ANC	Member
Asanda Tebekana	ANC	Member
Sindile Toni	ANC	Member
Makhaya Twabu	ANC	Member
Petros Vantyu	ANC	Member
Zilindile Vena	EFF	Member
Koliswa Vimbayo	ANC	Member
Zolile Williams	ANC	Member
Noncedo Zinti	UDM	Member
