= Andrew Whitfield (politician) =

South African politician (born 1982)

The Honourable Andrew Whitfield
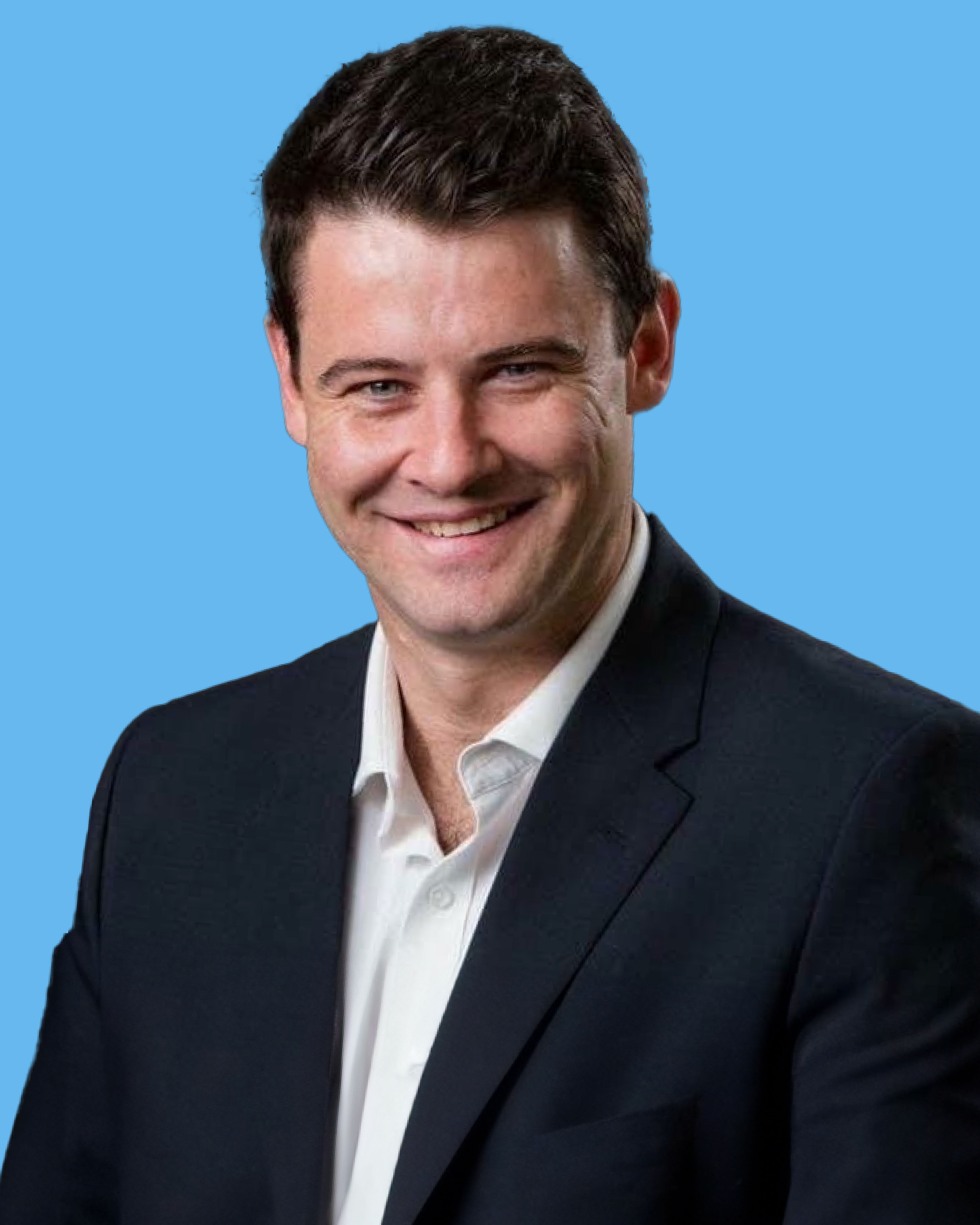

Deputy Minister of Trade, Industry and Competition
- In office 3 July 2024 – 26 June 2025
- President: Cyril Ramaphosa
- Minister: Parks Tau
- Preceded by: Fikile Majola; Nomalungelo Gina
- Succeeded by: Alexandra Abrahams

Provincial Leader of the Democratic Alliance in the Eastern Cape
- Incumbent
- Assumed office 25 February 2023
- Deputies: Mlindi Nhanha; Vicky Knoetze
- Preceded by: Nqaba Bhanga

Member of the National Assembly
- In office 22 May 2019 – 29 June 2026
- In office 21 May 2014 – 6 August 2016
Former offices 2017–2024
Shadow Minister of Police
In office 5 June 2019 – 28 May 2024
Deputy	Okkie Terblanche
Leader	John Steenhuisen; Mmusi Maimane
Preceded by	Zakhele Mbhele
Provincial Chairperson of the Democratic Alliance in the Eastern Cape
In office 6 May 2017 – 25 February 2023
Preceded by	Veliswa Mvenya
Succeeded by	Yusuf Cassim
Member of the Eastern Cape Provincial Legislature
In office 28 June 2018 – 7 May 2019

Personal details
- Born: Andrew Grant Whitfield; 24 November 1982 (age 43)
- Party: Democratic Alliance
- Education: Rhodes University (BA, BA(Hons))

Andrew Grant Whitfield (born 24 November 1982) is a South African politician who served as Deputy Minister of Trade, Industry and Competition from July 2024 until his dismissal in June 2025. He is also the provincial leader of the Democratic Alliance (DA) in the Eastern Cape.

He entered politics in as a local councillor in Nelson Mandela Bay between 2011 and 2014. He went on to represent the DA as a Member of the National Assembly from 2014 to 2016, as a Member of the Mayoral Committee in Nelson Mandela Bay from 2016 to 2018, and as a Member of the Provincial Legislature from 2018 to 2019. He returned to the National Assembly in the 2019 general election and was Shadow Minister of Police until he was appointed to his deputy ministerial post in June 2024.

Whitfield was elected as the DA's provincial leader in February 2023. Before that, he served two terms as the party's provincial chairman between 2017 and 2023.

== Education ==
Whitfield attended St. Andrew's College, matriculating in 2000. He proceeded to study at Rhodes University from which he graduated with a Bachelor of Arts in Industrial Psychology and Political Sciences and then an Honours degree in Political Sciences.

== Political career ==
Whitfield entered frontline politics in the May 2011 local elections, when he was elected to represent the Democratic Alliance (DA) as a local councillor in Nelson Mandela Bay. However, in the general election of May 2014, he was ranked first on the DA's regional party list and was elected as a Member of the National Assembly. He served just over two years in his seat and was designated as an alternate member of the Portfolio Committee on Tourism.

Ahead of the August 2016 local elections, Whitfield led the DA's election campaign in Nelson Mandela Bay. The party formed a municipal government after the election and Whitfield returned to the council to serve in it. Newly elected mayor Athol Trollip appointed Whitfield as the Member of the Mayoral Committee (MMC) responsible for the economic development, tourism and agriculture portfolio. While he was serving as a local councillor, on 6 May 2017, he was additionally elected to succeed Veliswa Mvenya as provincial chairperson of the DA's Eastern Cape branch.

In June 2018, the DA redeployed Whitfield to fill a casual vacancy in the Eastern Cape Provincial Legislature; he was sworn in to his seat on 28 June 2018. Whitfield said that his new position would allow him to focus on his duties as DA provincial chairperson as well as on the upcoming 2019 general election campaign.

=== Shadow Minister of Police: 2019–2024 ===
After the general election was held in May 2019, Whitfield returned to the National Assembly, again ranked first on the DA's regional list. The DA caucus elected him to serve as Shadow Minister of Police in the shadow cabinet of Mmusi Maimane, and he was also appointed as the leader of the DA's constituency in Tsitsi-Kouga, Eastern Cape. He retained his shadow portfolio throughout the sixth Parliament, gaining re-election in the shadow cabinet of Maimane's successor, John Steenhuisen. His policy initiatives in the police portfolio included a proposal to legislate parliamentary oversight of the National Security Council. In addition, from 1 September 2022, he succeeded Annette Steyn as a DA whip in the National Assembly.

In August 2020, Whitfield was re-elected unopposed as provincial chairperson of the Eastern Cape DA. Later in the parliamentary term, Nqaba Bhanga announced his intention to stand down as DA provincial leader at the next elective conference, and Whitfield launched a campaign to succeed him. He was elected provincial leader on 25 February 2023 at the party's conference in Graaff-Reinet, defeating the outgoing deputy provincial leader, Chantel King. Vicky Knoetze and Mlindi Nhanha were elected as Whitfield's deputies. In the following months he supported John Steenhuisen's successful bid for re-election as DA federal leader.

=== Deputy Minister of Trade and Industry: 2024–2025 ===
Whitfield was re-elected to his seat in the National Assembly in the May 2024 general election. In the aftermath of the election, as part of a coalition agreement between the DA and African National Congress (ANC), President Cyril Ramaphosa appointed Whitfield as Deputy Minister of Trade, Industry and Competition. In that capacity he deputised Minister Parks Tau of the ANC and served alongside Zuko Godlimpi, also of the ANC.

On 26 June 2025, Ramaphosa dismissed Whitfield as a deputy minister. DA leader John Steenhuisen decried the move to sack Whitfield as a deputy minister as "calculated assault" and issued Ramaphosa with a 48-hour ultimatum to remove corruption-accused ANC ministers and deputy ministers. The following day, Ramaphosa released a statement to explain that he removed Whitfield as a deputy minister because he traveled to the United States without permission from the president.

=== Later career ===
In February 2026, Whitfield expressed support for Cape Town Mayor Geordin Hill-Lewis's potential bid for DA leader. He was re-elected for a second term as DA provincial leader.

Following Geordin Hill-Lewis's election as DA federal leader in April 2026, Whitfield stood in the subsequent election for leader of the DA's parliamentary caucus. He lost the caucus vote to George Michalakis on 7 May 2026. Whitfield resigned from the National Assembly on 29 June 2026.
