= Mkhuseli Jack =

South African politician and businessman

Chairperson of Build One South Africa
- Incumbent
- Assumed office 24 September 2022
- Leader: Mmusi Maimane
- Preceded by: Party founded

Deputy Mayor of Nelson Mandela Bay
- In office 21 September 2022 – 26 May 2023
- Mayor: Retief Odendaal
- Succeeded by: Babalwa Lobishe

Personal details
- Born: 31 May 1958 (age 68) Mosskraal farm, Humansdorp, Eastern Cape South Africa
- Party: Build One South Africa
- Other political affiliations: United Democratic Front
- Spouse: Karen
- Children: 2

Mkhuseli "Khusta" Jack (born 31 May 1958) is a South African politician, businessman and anti-apartheid activist. Jack currently serves as the chairperson of Build One South Africa. He previously served as the deputy mayor of Nelson Mandela Bay.

He was known in the 1980s for his involvement in the anti-apartheid struggle and his efforts in the Consumer Boycott Campaign. Currently he is a businessman in Port Elizabeth, South Africa.

== Early life ==
Mkhuseli Jack was born on 31 May 1958, on the Mosskraal Farm in Humansdorp, a small town in one of the districts surrounding the Eastern Cape in South Africa. Born to Fikile and Alice Jack, he was the second youngest of eight children. At the age of six, Jack and his family moved to a farm in Klipdrift near Oyster Bay. There he attended the Anglican Slangriver Bantu School, where he completed Standard Four. He finished Standard Five and Six in a coastal town called Jeffreys Bay due to the lack of a permit he required to complete his schooling in Humansdorp. In 1975, he moved to Port Elizabeth to stay with his uncle. After being denied entrance to a school, Jack and other children in the same situation involved themselves in demonstrations, demanding an education. With the support of local organisations he managed to enroll in a school in 1975. Before matriculating in 1982 at Cowan High School, Jack completed Standard Seven and Eight at Loviso Secondary School. While still at school, from 1979 to 1980, he was arrested several times, once during the 1980 school boycotts.

== Early engagement in politics ==
Mkhuseli Jack only learned about the system of apartheid in South Africa when he moved to the city of Port Elizabeth to continue his high school education. The Apartheid laws had prevented him from enrolling in a school, but co-operating with local organisations he managed to enroll in 1975, where he developed as a leader amongst his peers. Later, he helped create and lead the Port Elizabeth Youth Congress, part of the United Democratic Front (UDF) and became involved in the emerging civic movement. Jack helped form the United Democratic Front on 20 August 1983. It was an Umbrella Organization composed of trade unions, women's groups and youth organisations. The UDF coordinated these groups, while focusing on sorting out problems in the Port Elizabeth area.

The United Democratic Front initially gained attention through low-key, non-violent acts of defiance such as rent boycotts and labour strikes. Its members encouraged people to get involved in problems that afflicted them directly. The organisation's motto was: "We'll support you in what concerns you and you can support us in what concerns us." The interests of the organisation essentially ran parallel to those of the people it worked with. Via the support they offered, they were in turn able to gain the faith and support of those they had helped.

At this time, while Jack was active in the South African Students Movement (SASM) and the Black Consciousness Movement (BCM), he came in contact with Barney Pityana, a human rights lawyer and South African theologian. Jack's relation to Barney Pityana shaped his early political views and career.

== Involvement in the anti-apartheid struggle ==
The non-violent acts of civil disobedience that had been led by Nelson Mandela in the early stages of the Anti-Apartheid movement had caught the attention of the world. Although they were received positively, they had not done enough to bring down the Apartheid regime. The armed branch of the ANC, Umkhonto we Sizwe (Spear of the Nation), as well as other organisations that had opposed the regime with violence during the later stages of the Anti-Apartheid movement, had failed. The use of violence had given the government more incentive to suppress protesters all around South Africa. Nationwide opposition to Apartheid had spread across the country and gained momentum after the 1976 Soweto Uprising. In 1985, waves of unrest swept across the black townships in South Africa. Security forces tried to contain the unrest using a containment policy that often provoked and incited violent confrontations. Mkhuseli Jack understood that violence wouldn't work against a regime that was strongly armed and stressed the importance of cohesion and co-ordination amongst those opposing the Apartheid Regime. He began forming street committees where members would meet at random points on roadsides so as to seem informal and not arouse suspicion. He also recruited neighbourhood leaders to settle disputes and represent their interests. Jack stuck to non-violence and coordinated strikes, boycotts and marches. Due to his involvement, Jack often found himself in prison. His imprisonment coupled with hunger strikes endeared him to the black community and as a result, Jack's importance grew.

At the end of Apartheid Jack took part in dismantling the regime during the negotiations from 1990 to 1993.

=== The Consumer Boycott Campaign ===
Economic boycotts, both internally and internationally, played a role in bringing down the Apartheid Regime. Mkhuseli Jack was one of the few people in South Africa at the time to use them. Aged twenty-seven, Mkhuseli Jack was a spokesperson and one of the main leaders of the movement, which would become known as the Consumer Boycott Campaign. It would play a significant role in destabilising the regime.

Affected by the ongoing violence, the black citizens of Port Elizabeth began insisting on searching for an alternative form of resistance. As a result, in 1985, the UDF organised a boycott aimed at white owned businesses. The main aim of the boycott was to assert that no business can operate against a backdrop of chaos and inequality in society. By targeting white owned businesses, the organizers of the boycott also appealed to the conscience of white citizens, making them aware of the suffering of the black citizens. Via the numerous street committees, the UDF made sure that everybody who was to participate was kept informed as to how events would unfold. By recruiting local business owners and standardising prices in the townships, it was insured that those who participated would not be affected. On 15 July 1985, all of the black population in Port Elizabeth complied and white-owned businesses, usually full of black customers, stood empty. At the time, black consumers made up about 47% of South Africa's national buying power compared to 40% for whites and the remaining 13% for Indians and people of mixed race. After five days, in an attempt to extinguish the boycott, the government declared a state of emergency in the townships of Port Elizabeth on 21 July 1985. This did not deter the movement, instead it signalled to its leaders that the boycott was having the desired effect.

"Once you cut the ground out under their feet, the government starts to panic" – Mkhuseli Jack

The initial demands made by the leaders of the boycott were simple and included the opening of public facilities to all races, the removal of troops from the townships, the release of Nelson Mandela and that blacks and whites share a single education system. The demands were a factor, which caused such success and growth in participation for the boycott. They were in line with what the people in the townships around Port Elizabeth wanted.

As the Consumer Boycott Campaign continued, support for it increased. The scope of the entire campaign as well as its demands grew as a result. A second state of emergency was declared by the government on 12 June 1986. The international seclusion and its effects on the economy, coupled with the internal factor of an ever growing consumer boycott campaign, forced the regime to initiate negotiations.

Mkhuseli Jack, along with other leaders of the boycott, was jailed in August 1986 for his role in the campaign and released almost three years later in May 1989.

"The boycott succeeded because of broad mass participation, because of international solidarity, the fact that the regimes violence against our people backfired and the resilience of our people" – Mkhuseli Jack

== Post apartheid activity and influence ==
In the early 1990s, Mkhuseli Jack earned an honours degree in Economics & Development Studies at Sussex University in England. He worked for different companies, principally in development and management, including:

- Ilinge Development Services (Proprietary) Limited, as managing director and Founding Member.
- African Brick Centre Ltd. as non-executive director from 1 September 2007 until 25 September 2009.
- Ukuvula Investment Holding as non-executive director.

He is a member of the Eastern Cape Demarcation Board, the National Fishing Quota Board, the SA Statistics Council , Algoa FM, Irvin & Johnson and Omega Risk Solutions. He also serves as Chairman of the Port Elizabeth Technical Colleges, St Francis Hospice and Emfuleni Resorts. In 2009, Mkhuseli Jack was named as one of a group of powerful Eastern Cape businesspeople that emerged as bankrollers of the breakaway political party, the Congress of the People (COPE), which formally split from the ANC on the 1. November 2008.

Today, Mkhuseli Jack is a businessman in Port Elizabeth. He is also a professor at the 2013 School of Authentic Journalism. Parallel to that, Jack is raising a family with his wife Karen with whom he has two children. On 19 June 2013, he received "The Lawson Award", dedicated to people who are leaders in environmental protection, protection of indigenous peoples, political rights, and fight for the end of racism. In 2006 a coalition of more than 70 Palestinian civil society organisations launched a call for boycott directly inspired by Mkhuseli Jack's action, against the Israeli state, known as the BDS campaign.
