= Marshall von Buchenroder =

South African politician

Marshall von Buchenroder MPL

Member of the Eastern Cape Provincial Legislature
- Incumbent
- Assumed office 21 May 2014

Councillor, Nelson Mandela Bay Metropolitan Municipality
- In office 2006–2014

Personal details
- Born: Marshall Roberto Von Buchenroder; 1972 or 1973 (age 52–53)
- Party: Democratic Alliance
- Education: Chatty Senior Secondary School
- Alma mater: Peninsula Technikon
- Occupation: Member of Parliament
- Profession: Politician

Marshall Roberto von Buchenroder (born 1972 or 1973) is a South African politician for the Democratic Alliance (DA). Von Buchenroder is currently a member of the Eastern Cape Provincial Legislature.

== Biography ==
Von Buchenroder matriculated from Chatty Senior Secondary School and studied at Peninsula Technikon. In 2006, he was elected as a councillor for the Democratic Alliance in the Nelson Mandela Bay Metropolitan Municipality. During his eight years as a councillor, he was chief whip of the DA caucus. Von Buchenroder has also been a constituency chair for the DA for three terms, a constituency leader in Winterhoek and a deputy provincial chair.

In 2014, Von Buchenroder was elected as a member of the Eastern Cape Provincial Legislature for the DA. He was re-elected for a second term in 2019. He was appointed as Shadow MEC (Member of the Executive Council) for Transport by caucus leader Nqaba Bhanga.

Von Buchenroder is married. He is fluent in Afrikaans and English.
