= Chantel King =

South African politician (born 1976)

Chantel King MPL

Member of the Eastern Cape Provincial Legislature
- Incumbent
- Assumed office 14 June 2024

Member of the National Assembly of South Africa
- In office 8 November 2016 – 28 May 2024
- Constituency: Eastern Cape

Deputy Leader of the Democratic Alliance in the Eastern Cape
- In office 29 August 2020 – 25 February 2023 Serving with Bobby Stevenson
- Leader: Nqaba Bhanga

Councillor in the Buffalo City Metropolitan Municipality
- In office July 2015 – October 2016

Personal details
- Born: 2 December 1976 (age 49)
- Party: Democratic Alliance
- Education: B.Com (UWC) & NPDE (NWU)

Chantel King (born 2 December 1976) is a South African politician and educator. A member of the Democratic Alliance, she was sworn in as a Buffalo City councillor in July 2015. King became a Member of Parliament in November 2016. She then became Shadow Deputy Minister of Science and Technology in January 2017. In December 2020 King was appointed as Shadow Minister of Higher Education, Science and Technology. King became a member of the Eastern Cape Provincial Legislature in 2024.

== Career ==
King was a teacher at the John Bisseker High School before she became active in politics. She joined the Democratic Alliance in 2015. King served as the branch secretary for ward 19 and as the women's network representative in the party's Buffalo City coastal constituency. In July 2015, she was appointed as a councillor of the Buffalo City Metropolitan Municipality. King resigned from the council in October 2016.

On 8 November 2016, King was sworn in as a Member of the National Assembly, replacing Annette Lovemore. She became a member of the Portfolio Committee on Science and Technology on 8 December 2016. On 1 January 2017, King became Shadow Deputy Minister of Science and Technology following her appointment in November 2016.

She ran for provincial chairperson of the DA's women network in March 2018, but lost to Georgina Faldtman, a DA councillor in Nelson Mandela Bay. On 12 September 2018, she was appointed to the Portfolio Committee on Basic Education as an alternate member. King relinquished her membership on the Portfolio Committee on Science and Technology that following month.

She was re-elected to Parliament in the 2019 general election. King was elected as one of two deputy DA provincial leaders in August 2020. She serves alongside party veteran Bobby Stevenson. On 5 December 2020, she was appointed as Shadow Minister of Higher Education, Science and Technology.

In January 2023, HeraldLIVE reported that King was vying for the position of provincial leader of the DA after incumbent Nqaba Bhanga announced his intention to stand down. Around 300 delegates met in the town of Graaff-Reinet from 24–25 February 2023 to elect the new DA provincial leadership. King's main challenger for the position was fellow Member of Parliament and the DA's provincial chairperson Andrew Whitfield. She lost to Whitfield at the provincial conference. She accepted the outcome and said that she would support Whitfield.

King became a member of the Eastern Cape Provincial Legislature following the 2024 national and provincial elections.
