= Horatio Hendricks =

South African politician and former educator

Horatio Hendricks MPL
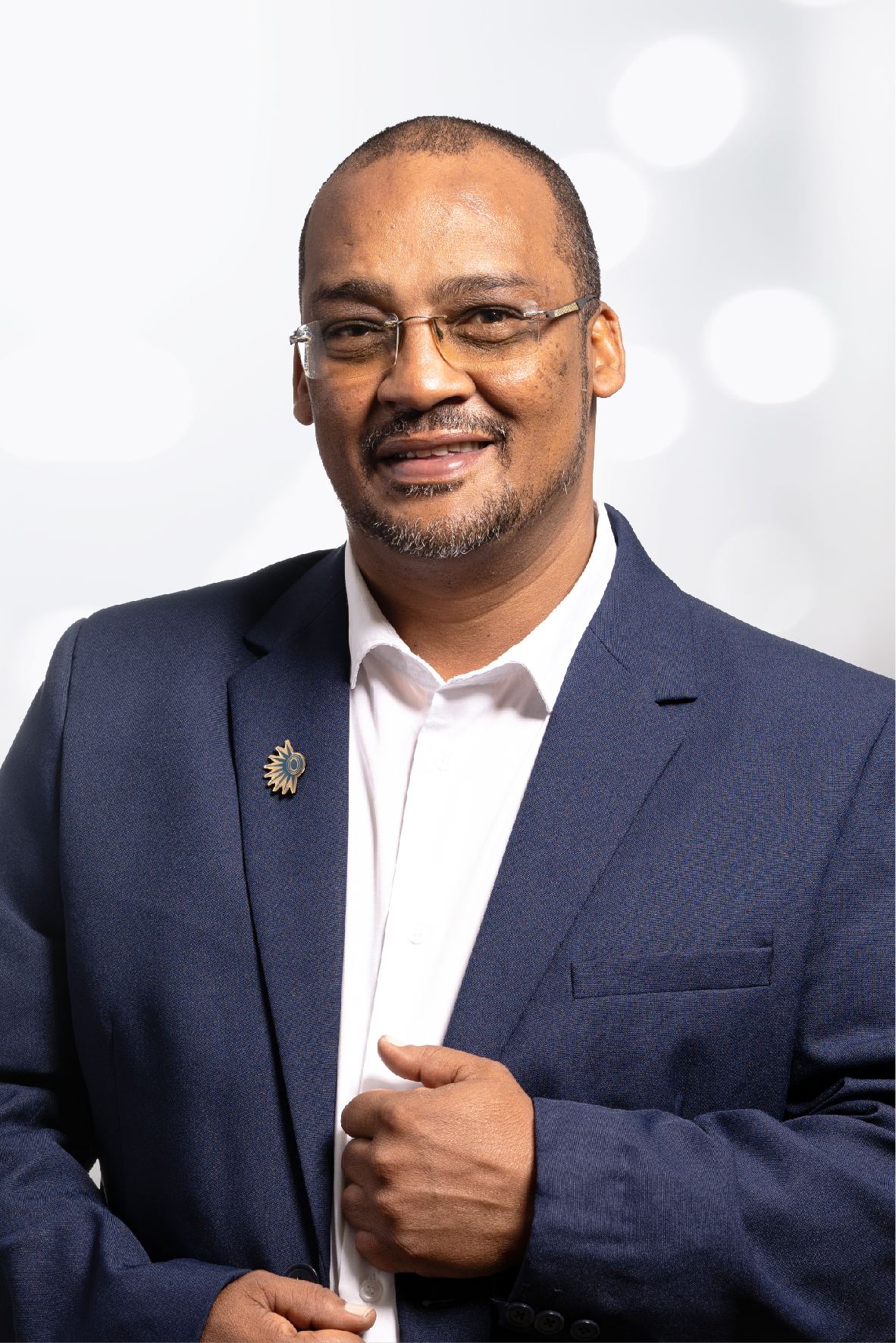
- Hendricks in 2021

Member of the Eastern Cape Provincial Legislature
- Incumbent
- Assumed office 7 July 2023
- Preceded by: Edmund van Vuuren

Executive Mayor of the Kouga Local Municipality
- In office 20 April 2018 – 26 June 2023
- Deputy: Hattingh Bornman
- Preceded by: Elza van Lingen
- Succeeded by: Hattingh Bornman

Speaker of the Kouga Local Municipality
- In office 21 August 2016 – 20 April 2018
- Preceded by: Magdelene Dlomo
- Succeeded by: Hattingh Bornman

Personal details
- Born: Horatio Hendricks Hillside, Port Elizabeth, South Africa
- Party: Democratic Alliance
- Education: Vista University
- Profession: Politician

Horatio Hendricks is a South African politician and former educator who has been a member of the Eastern Cape Provincial Legislature since 2023. He previously served as the Speaker of the Kouga Local Municipality from 2016 to 2018 and then as mayor of the municipality from 2018 until 2023. Hendricks is a member of the Democratic Alliance (DA).

== Life and career ==
Hendricks was born and grew up in Hillside, Port Elizabeth. He received his teaching qualification from the old Vista University. He then proceeded to work as a teacher at Andrieskraal Primary School for 22 years and was principal for the last 12 years. Hendricks later became a member of the Democratic Alliance. He became a DA councillor in the Cacadu District Municipality (now the Sarah Baartman District Municipality) in 2009 and chaired the district's Municipal Public Accounts Committee (MPAC) from 2011 to 2012.

Following the DA's victory in the Kouga Local Municipality in the 2016 local government elections, Hendricks was elected to serve as the municipality's council speaker for the 2016–2021 term. Executive Mayor Elza van Lingen died from cancer in April 2018. Hendricks was then elected as executive mayor while DA councillor Hattingh Bornman replaced Hendricks as council speaker. In June 2021, Hendricks wrote to the provincial government to request that the municipality be declared a disaster area due to the severe drought.

In September 2021, Hendricks was announced as the DA's mayoral candidate for the Kouga municipality ahead of the local government elections on 1 November 2021. In October 2021, News24's Out of Order Index rated the Kouga Municipality as the best performing municipality in the Eastern Cape. The DA retained its outright majority on the municipal council on 1 November 2021. Hendricks was re-elected unopposed as mayor on 17 November 2021.

In February 2023, Hendricks was elected as one of three deputy provincial chairpersons of the DA.

Hendricks resigned as Kouga mayor and as a PR councillor on 26 June 2023 after he was selected to fill the casual vacancy that arose when DA MPL Edmund van Vuuren resigned from the Eastern Cape Provincial Legislature. The PR councillor vacancy was filled by Gregory Stuurman from Loerie and deputy mayor Hattingh Bornman was elected to succeed Hendricks as mayor on 30 June 2023. Hendricks was sworn in as a member of the Provincial Legislature on 7 July 2023.

Political offices
| Preceded by Elza van Lingen | Executive Mayor of the Kouga Local Municipality; 2018–2023 | Succeeded by Hattingh Bornman |
| Preceded by Magdalene Dlomo | Speaker of the Kouga Local Municipality; 2016–2018 | Succeeded by Hattingh Bornman |
