= Sanele Magaqa =

South African politician

Sanele Magaqa MPL

Member of the Eastern Cape Provincial Legislature
- Incumbent
- Assumed office 23 September 2015
- Preceded by: Nokonwaba Matikinca

Personal details
- Born: Sanele Magaqa
- Party: Democratic Alliance
- Occupation: Member of the Provincial Legislature
- Profession: Politician

Sanele Magaqa is a South African politician and a member of the Eastern Cape Provincial Legislature for the Democratic Alliance (DA). He previously served as a DA councillor in the Buffalo City Metropolitan Municipality and the Amathole District Municipality.

== Political career ==
Magaqa had served as a Democratic Alliance councillor in the Amathole District Municipality. He was then elected as a DA councillor in the Buffalo City Metropolitan Municipality in 2011. In September 2015, he resigned from the Buffalo City Council and was sworn in as a member of the Eastern Cape Provincial Legislature for the DA. He was appointed as Shadow MEC for Human Settlements. Magaqa was elected to a full term in the provincial legislature in 2019.

== Personal life ==
In April 2018, Magaqa was hijacked by seven armed men in King William's Town in the Eastern Cape.

In June 2021, Magaqa appeared in the Keiskammahoek Magistrate’s Court for allegedly assaulting a woman in Keiskammahoek back in December 2017.
