= Jaco Burger =

Jaco Burger may refer to:

- Jaco Burger (cricketer)
- Jaco Burger (politician)
