= Virginia Camealio-Benjamin =

South African politician

Virginia Camealio-Benjamin MPL

Member of the Eastern Cape Provincial Legislature
- Incumbent
- Assumed office 22 May 2019

Personal details
- Party: African National Congress
- Occupation: Member of the Provincial Legislature
- Profession: Politician

Virginia Alice Camealio-Benjamin is a South African politician who has been a Member of the Eastern Cape Provincial Legislature since May 2019. She was a councillor of the Kouga Local Municipality before her election to provincial legislature. Camealio-Benjamin is a member of the African National Congress.

== Politics ==
Camealio-Benjamin is a member of the African National Congress. She served as a councillor of the Kouga Local Municipality. In June 2011, newly elected Kouga mayor Booi Koerat appointed her the member of the mayoral committee for tourism and creative industries. Koerat resigned in 2015 and Daphne Kettledas was elected as his successor. She retained Camealio-Benjamin in her position. She later became chief whip of the ANC caucus.

In the 2016 municipal election, the Democratic Alliance unseated the ANC as the governing party of the municipality. At the inaugural council sitting, the ANC nominated her as their mayoral candidate. She lost to the DA's Elza van Lingen after receiving only 12 votes compared to Van Lingen's 17. Camealio-Benjamin remained ANC chief whip.

== Provincial legislature ==
Camealio-Benjamin was nominated to the Eastern Cape Provincial Legislature after the 8 May 2019 provincial election. She was sworn in on 22 May and the ANC appointed her as a whip. On 3 June, she received her committee assignments.

=== Committees ===
- Cooperative Governance & Traditional Affairs
- Safety and Liaison
- Public Participation, Petitions & Education
- Roads and Transport
