= Veliswa Mvenya =

South African politician

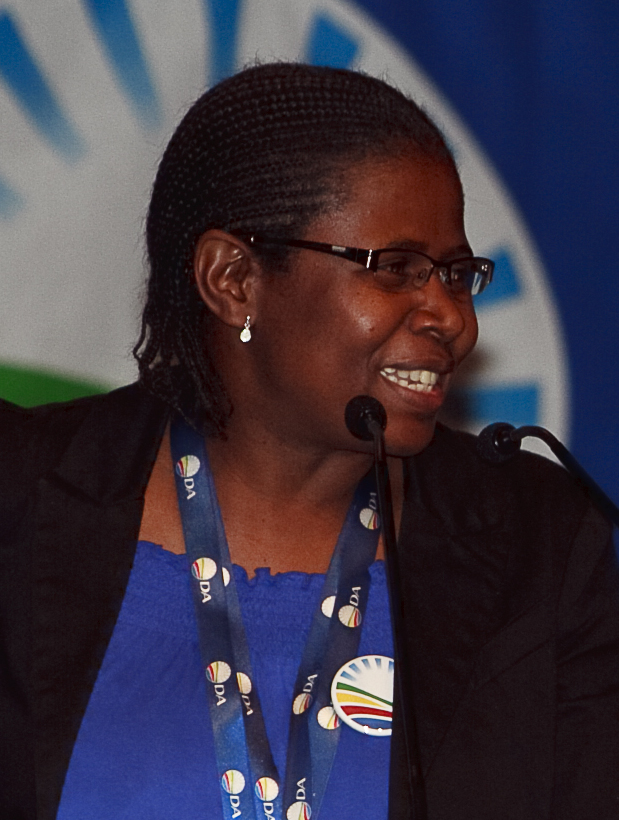
- Mvenya in July 2010

Member of the Eastern Cape Provincial Legislature
- In office 22 May 2019 – 1 June 2021
- In office 2004–2018

Provincial Chairperson of the Democratic Alliance
- In office November 2014 – 19 May 2016
- Preceded by: Edmund van Vuuren
- Succeeded by: Andrew Whitfield

Personal details
- Born: Veliswa Mvenya; 8 March 1969 (age 57) Ntseshe, Ngqamakhwe, Cape Province
- Party: Batho Pele Movement (2021–present)
- Other party: African Transformation Movement (2018–2021); Democratic Alliance (2000–2018)
- Children: 2
- Profession: Educator; Politician

Veliswa Mvenya (born 8 March 1969) is a South African politician who is the founding leader of the Batho Pele Movement, a party she founded in June 2021 after leaving the African Transformation Movement.

A former mathematics teacher, Mvenya had joined the Democratic Alliance in 2000 and served as a DA councillor in the Amathole District Municipality until 2004 when she was elected to the Eastern Cape Provincial Legislature as a DA representative. She was re-elected in 2009 and 2014. In 2014, she was elected as the provincial chairwoman of the DA in the Eastern Cape. Mvenya held the position until her 'shock' resignation in May 2016. She resigned from the DA in May 2018 and joined the ATM in September 2018. Mvenya was the party's premier candidate for the May 2019 election. At the election, she was elected as the ATM's sole representative in the legislature. In June 2021, she resigned from the ATM and established the Batho Pele Movement.

== Early life and education ==
Mvenya was born on 8 March 1969. She is one of three children born to a single mother. She attended Ntseshe Primary School and later Colosha Senior Secondary School where she matriculated. Mvenya obtained a teacher's diploma as well as a diploma in public administration.

== Teaching career ==
Mvenya started her teaching career in 1991. She taught mathematics at Ntlahlane Junior Secondary School until 1993. From 1993 to 2004, she was a teacher at Mavata Junior Secondary School.

== Political career ==
Mvenya joined the Democratic Party in 2000, the same year the DP merged with the New National Party and Federal Alliance to form the Democratic Alliance. In December of the same year, she was elected as a councillor of the Amathole District Municipality. She served on the council until her election to the Eastern Cape Provincial Legislature in 2004. She was re-elected as an MPL in 2009.

In 2012, Mvenya was elected deputy provincial leader of the DA. She was previously the provincial and national chairwoman of the party's Women's Network. After the provincial election in May 2014, she returned to the legislature for another term as a DA MPL. She was elected provincial chairperson of the DA in November of that same year. She held the position until her 'shock' resignation in May 2016 due to infighting within the party in the Eastern Cape and bad relations with provincial leader Athol Trollip.

In May 2017, Mvenya ran for provincial leader of the party but lost to Nqaba Bhanga. Andrew Whitfield succeeded her as provincial chair. In May 2018, she resigned from the DA and automatically ceased to be a member of the provincial legislature. She then joined the newly established African Transformation Movement in September. Following the provincial election in May 2019, Mvenya returned to the legislature as the party's sole representative.

In June 2021, she resigned from the ATM and formed the Batho Pele Movement, a 'non-hierarchical party' that focuses on service delivery. The party will contest the 2021 municipal elections.

== Personal life ==
Mvenya is unmarried. She has two children.
