= Zinzi =

Zinzi is a given name and a surname. Notable people with the name include:

== Given name ==
- Zinzi Chabangu (born 1996), South African triple jumper
- Zinzi Clemmons (born 1985), American writer
- Zinzi Coogler (born 1985), American film producer
- Zinzi Rabe (fl. from 2019), nickname of Zinziswa Rabe, South African politician

== Surname ==
- Domenico Zinzi (born 1943), Italian politician
- Gianpiero Zinzi (born 1983), Italian politician
