= Leander Kruger =

South African politician

Member of the Eastern Cape Provincial Legislature
- Incumbent
- Assumed office 13 December 2023

Personal details
- Born: 1989 or 1990 (age 35–36)
- Party: Democratic Alliance (2012–present)
- Education: Rhodes University (BCom); Nelson Mandela University (LLB, LLM)

Leander Kruger (born 1990) is a South African politician and lawyer who has served as a member of the Eastern Cape Provincial Legislature since 2023, representing the Democratic Alliance, the official opposition in the province. He had previously served as a councillor of the Nelson Mandela Bay Metropolitan Municipality.

== Background ==
Kruger earned a Bachelor of Commerce from Rhodes University before receiving his Bachelor of Laws from Nelson Mandela University. He worked as a lecturer at the Law Faculty while he completed his Master of Laws in Tax Law at Nelson Mandela University. He is an Admitted Attorney of the High Court.

== Political career ==
In 2012, Kruger became a Democratic Alliance Youth (DAY) branch representative. He was later elected as a deputy chairperson of a DAY constituency.

Kruger was elected as a proportional representation (PR) councillor for the DA in Nelson Mandela Bay during the 2016 local government elections. He was a member of the council's Budget and Treasury, Public Health and Rules and Ethics committees. By 2018, he was deputy chairperson of the DA's Port Elizabeth South Constituency as well as representative of the Association of Democratic Alliance Councillors. He was also a member of the DA's provincial executive committee as well as the party's provincial disciplinary committee. He was a participant of the DA's Young Leaders Programme in 2018.

Kruger served as chief of staff to former DA Nelson Mandela Bay mayor Retief Odendaal (2022−2023).

Kruger was sworn in as a DA member of the Eastern Cape Provincial Legislature in December 2023; he filled the casual vacancy that arose when Nqaba Bhanga's party membership was terminated. At the time of his appointment, he was the youngest member of the DA caucus. He serves as the DA's spokesperson on Economic Development, Environmental Affairs and Tourism.
