= Mziwonke Ndabeni =

South African politician

Mziwonke Ndabeni MPL

Member of the Eastern Cape Provincial Legislature
- Incumbent
- Assumed office 22 May 2019

Personal details
- Citizenship: South Africa
- Party: African National Congress

Mziwonke Ndabeni is a South African politician who has represented the African National Congress (ANC) in the Eastern Cape Provincial Legislature since 2019. He is a former Provincial Secretary of the ANC Youth League (ANCYL) in the Eastern Cape.

== Political career ==
In August 2010, Ndabeni was elected Provincial Secretary of the ANCYL in the Eastern Cape. Immediately after his election, and still more than two years ahead of the ANC's 53rd National Conference, he endorsed former ANCYL President Fikile Mbalula's candidacy for the position of ANC Secretary-General, then held by Gwede Mantashe. In the 2014 general election, Ndabeni stood for election to the national Parliament, but he was ranked 171st on the ANC's national party list and was not elected to a seat.

However, when the ANCYL's provincial leadership was disbanded and replaced by an interim task team, Ndabeni was appointed to head the task team. He resigned from that position in November 2017, saying that internal party politics had placed him in "a compromised position": ahead of the ANC's 54th National Conference, the mainstream ANC in the province supported the presidential candidacy of Deputy President Cyril Ramaphosa while the ANCYL task team had endorsed Nkosazana Dlamini-Zuma, and Ndabeni said that he wanted to "give the Youth League space to articulate their position on issues without hindrance".

In the next general election in 2019, he was ranked ninth on the ANC's provincial party list and was elected to a seat in the Eastern Cape Provincial Legislature. In addition, the ANC appointed him as the party's head of elections in the province ahead of the 2021 local elections. In March 2022, the ANC National Executive Committee appointed him to the 31-member interim task team that temporarily replaced the Eastern Cape ANC's Provincial Executive Committee after the latter exceeded its term and was disbanded.

In September 2022, Ndabeni was found guilty of defamation in a case brought by Sitembiso Sicengu, a local councillor in the Eastern Cape.
