= Gary van Niekerk =

South African politician

Councillor Gary van Niekerk

Mayor of Nelson Mandela Bay
- In office 26 May 2023 – 31 October 2024
- Preceded by: Retief Odendaal
- Succeeded by: Babalwa Lobishe

Speaker of Nelson Mandela Bay
- In office 22 November 2021 – 26 May 2023
- Preceded by: Jonathan Lawack
- Succeeded by: Eugene Johnson

President of the Northern Alliance renamed National Alliance
- Incumbent
- Assumed office March 2021
- Preceded by: Party established

Deputy Mayor of Nelson Mandela Bay
- Incumbent
- Assumed office 1 November 2024
- Preceded by: Babalwa Lobishe

Personal details
- Born: Gqeberha
- Party: National Alliance

Gary van Niekerk is a South African politician who has been the Mayor of Nelson Mandela Bay from May 2023 until October 2024. Previously, he had served as the municipality's council speaker from November 2021 until May 2023. Van Niekerk is the current president of the National Alliance (previously named the Northern Alliance).

== Political career ==
In March 2021, Van Niekerk was appointed president of the Northern Alliance, a party that was established in August 2020 to represent the interests of the residents in the northern areas of Nelson Mandela Bay and later renamed as the National Alliance. In the local government elections held on 1 November 2021, the Northern Alliance won three seats on the Nelson Mandela Bay council. No party won a majority on the council again and Van Niekerk was selected to become a councillor for the NA.

During the first council meeting on 22 November 2021, Van Niekerk was elected as speaker of the council with the support of the African National Congress councillors and a bloc consisting of the councillors of smaller parties such as GOOD, the African Integrity Movement, the African Independent Congress, the United Democratic Movement, the Defenders of the People and the Pan-Africanist Congress of Azania. The ANC-led minority coalition was removed in September 2022 after the Northern Alliance and other political parties left the coalition. A Democratic Alliance-led coalition then took over control of the municipality and Van Niekerk remained as speaker.

In April 2023, the GOOD and UDM councillors filed a motion of no confidence against Van Niekerk over the alleged misuse of a municipal vehicle. Van Niekerk said that he would remain part of the DA-led coalition. The following month, he switched political allegiances from the DA to the ANC/EFF bloc amid a pending motion of no confidence against DA mayor Retief Odendaal. The ANC made it known on 16 May 2023 that they would support Van Niekerk to succeed Odendaal as mayor, if the motion of no confidence against Odendaal were to succeed. The motion was heard on 26 May 2023, and succeeded with Odendaal being removed as mayor. In the subsequent mayoral election held on the same day, Van Niekerk was nominated to stand against Odendaal. Van Niekerk was elected mayor in a vote that went 64 votes for him and 55 votes for Odendaal.

=== Party infighting ===
In October 2023, a rival faction in the National Alliance declared van Niekerk's membership of the party completely terminated. Nelson Mandela Bay speaker Noxolo Nqwazi declared van Niekerk's seat vacant. Van Niekerk is challenging both decisions.
