= Jaco Burger (politician) =

South African politician

Jaco Burger MPL

Member of the Eastern Cape Provincial Legislature
- Incumbent
- Assumed office 28 February 2023

Personal details
- Party: Freedom Front Plus

Jacobus Petrus Burger is a South African politician who has been the lone Freedom Front Plus member of the Eastern Cape Provincial Legislature since February 2023.

== Background ==
Burger was born in Hartswater in the Northern Cape. He has been a resident of the Eastern Cape for nearly three decades and is an environmentalist by profession. He is also a co-founder of the organisation Water Warriors in Nelson Mandela Bay. Burger is a member of the provincial management committee of the Freedom Front Plus.

== Provincial Legislature ==
Burger was sworn in as a Member of the Eastern Cape Provincial Legislature on 28 February 2023. He succeeded Theo Coetzee who died early-January 2023. Burger is the lone member of the FF+ in the provincial legislature.
