= Simthembile Madikizela =

South African politician

Simthembile Madikizela MPL

Member of the Eastern Cape Provincial Legislature
- Incumbent
- Assumed office 28 February 2023

Provincial Secretary of the Economic Freedom Fighters
- Incumbent
- Assumed office 6 November 2022
- Deputy: Zikhona Njoli; Zolile Mgqwayiza
- Preceded by: Mlamli Makhetha

Personal details
- Party: Economic Freedom Fighters
- Profession: Politician

Simthembile Madikizela is a South African politician who has been a member of the Eastern Cape Provincial Legislature since 2023. He is the current provincial secretary of the Economic Freedom Fighters.

== Political career ==
Madikizela was elected as the provincial secretary of the Economic Freedom Fighters at the party's provincial conference in November 2022. He was sworn in as a member of the Eastern Cape Provincial Legislature on 28 February 2023.
