= Mncedisi Filtane =

South African politician (died 2020)

Member of the Eastern Cape Provincial Legislature
- In office 22 May 2019 – 22 November 2020

Member of the National Assembly of South Africa
- In office 21 May 2014 – 7 May 2019

Personal details
- Born: Mncedisi Lutando Wellington Filtane
- Died: 22 November 2020
- Party: United Democratic Movement

Mncedisi Lutando Wellington Filtane (died 22 November 2020) was a South African politician who served as a Member of the Eastern Cape Provincial Legislature from 2019 to 2020. Filtane was a Member of the National Assembly of South Africa between 2014 and 2019. Filtane was also the deputy national chairperson of the United Democratic Movement.

== Parliamentary career ==
In 2014, Filtane was elected to the National Assembly via the United Democratic Movement's regional list. He was sworn in as a Member of Parliament on 21 May 2014.

=== Committee assignments ===
- Ad Hoc Committee on Police Minister's Report on Nkandla
- Powers and Privileges of Parliament
- Portfolio Committee on Agriculture, Forestry and Fisheries (Alternate member)
- Portfolio Committee on Public Works
- Portfolio Committee on Rural Development and Land Reform
- Portfolio Committee on Sport and Recreation (Alternate member)

== Member of the Eastern Cape Provincial Legislature ==
For the 2019 election, Filtane was the first candidate on the UDM's provincial list. He was elected to the Eastern Cape Provincial Legislature when the party won two seats.

== Death ==
Filtane died from COVID-19 on 22 November 2020. His death was confirmed by the national president of the UDM, Bantu Holomisa.

Since his death, four of his family members have died from the virus. His son, brother, sister and brother-in-law Loyiso Mpumlwana (who served as an African National Congress MP) have all succumbed.
