= Mzoleli Mrara =

South African politician

Mzoleli Mrara MPL

Member of the Eastern Cape Provincial Legislature
- Incumbent
- Assumed office 2009

Personal details
- Citizenship: South Africa
- Party: African National Congress
- Other party: South African Communist Party

Mzoleli Mrara is a South African politician who has represented the African National Congress (ANC) in the Eastern Cape Provincial Legislature since 2009. He was formerly the Chief Whip of the Majority Party in the legislature from 2013 to 2018. He also serves as the Provincial Chairperson of the Eastern Cape branch of the South African Communist Party.

== Political career ==
He was elected to an ANC seat in the provincial legislature in the 2009 general election, ranked 27th on the ANC's provincial party list. Near the end of the legislative term, in August 2013, the ANC named him as Chief Whip of the Majority Party in the provincial legislature. He replaced Humphrey Maxegwana, who was removed in line with an ANC resolution that Chief Whips should be selected from among the members of the party's internal Provincial Executive Committee.

In the 2014 general election, Mrara was ranked 11th on the ANC's party list and retained both his legislative seat and his position in the Chief Whip's office. In 2015, there was a minor nepotism scandal when the Daily Dispatch reported that he had hired the mother of his child as a researcher in his office.

In February 2018, the ANC announced that it had removed Mrara from the Chief Whip position, replacing him with Fundile Gade; Mrara remained an ordinary Member of the Provincial Legislature and succeeded Gade as chairperson of the legislature's Portfolio Committee on Education. He was re-elected to his seat in the 2019 general election, ranked 42nd on the ANC's list, and was subsequently elected chairperson of the Portfolio Committee on the Office of the Premier.

In addition to his legislative career, Mzala is a former Provincial Chairperson of the South African Democratic Teachers Union and a current provincial leader of the South African Communist Party (SACP). He has been the Provincial Chairperson of the SACP's Eastern Cape branch since at least 2015, and he was re-elected unopposed to that position in June 2022 alongside Provincial Secretary Xolile Nqatha and Deputy Provincial Chairperson Mpumelelo Saziwa.

== Personal life ==
Mzara has at least one child. His father, Thembile Ebby Mrara, died in Port Elizabeth in 2016.
