= Nontutuzelo Maqubela =

South African politician

Nontutuzelo Maqubela MPL

Member of the Eastern Cape Provincial Legislature
- Incumbent
- Assumed office 22 May 2019

Personal details
- Citizenship: South Africa
- Party: African National Congress

Nontutuzelo Maqubela is a South African politician who has represented the African National Congress (ANC) in the Eastern Cape Provincial Legislature since 2019. She has served as Deputy Chairperson of Committees in the legislature since December 2022.

== Political career ==
Maqubela was elected to her legislative seat in the 2019 general election, ranked 41st on the ANC's provincial party list.

At a party provincial elective conference in Buffalo City in May 2022, she was elected to a four-year term as a member of the Provincial Executive Committee of the ANC's provincial branch in the Eastern Cape. By number of votes received, she was ranked 25th of the 30 ordinary members elected to the committee.

In December 2022, she was named as the Deputy Chairperson of Committees in the provincial legislature, deputising Tony Duba, who had formerly held the position.
