= Eugene Johnson (politician) =

South African politician and businesswoman

Councillor Eugene Johnson

Speaker of the Nelson Mandela Bay Council
- Incumbent
- Assumed office 26 May 2023
- Preceded by: Gary van Niekerk

Mayor of Nelson Mandela Bay
- In office 22 November 2021 – 21 September 2022
- Preceded by: Nqaba Bhanga
- Succeeded by: Retief Odendaal

Personal details
- Party: African National Congress
- Education: University of Fort Hare
- Profession: Businesswoman; Politician

Eugene Johnson is a South African politician and businesswoman who has served as the speaker of the Nelson Mandela Bay Council since May 2023. She served as the Executive Mayor of the Nelson Mandela Bay Metropolitan Municipality from 2021 until 2022. She had previously served as a councillor in Nelson Mandela Bay from 2005 to 2010. Johnson is a member of the African National Congress.

== Education ==
Johnson obtained a certificate in local governance, law and public administration from the University of Fort Hare. In 2020, she obtained a matric certificate at the age of 60.

== Career ==
A member of the African National Congress, she served as a councillor on the Nelson Mandela Bay Metropolitan Municipality council from 2005 to 2010. Johnson is a businesswoman by profession. Before she was elected mayor, she was a consultant for the Swedish-funded non-profit organisation, Ubutjebi Trust, on urban development and human settlements in the city. She has over 20 years' of experience in governance and has been a member of the National Economic Development and Labour Council.

== Mayoral career: 2021–2022 ==
In the local government elections held on 1 November 2021, no party obtained a majority of seats on the Nelson Mandela Bay city council. The ANC and DA both won 48 seats. Johnson was announced as the ANC's mayoral candidate for Nelson Mandela Bay on 21 November 2021. At the council meeting the next day, Johnson was elected as mayor with the help of a bloc consisting of small parties such as the Northern Alliance, the United Democratic Movement, the Defenders of the People, the African Independent Movement, GOOD, the Pan Africanist Congress of Azania and the Patriotic Alliance. She received 60 out of 119 votes, while incumbent mayor Nqaba Bhanga from the Democratic Alliance received only 59 votes. Shortly after her election, Johnson appointed her mayoral committee. She led a minority coalition government in the municipality.

On 21 September 2022, Johnson was ousted as mayor through a motion of no confidence. 62 councillors voted in support of the motion, while 58 voted against the motion. She was succeeded by the DA's Retief Odendaal.

== Speaker of Council: 2023 ==
Following Gary van Niekerk's election as mayor of the metro on 26 May 2023, Johnson was voted in to replace him as council speaker.
