= Ncediwe Nobevu-Booi =

South African politician

Member of the Eastern Cape Provincial Legislature
- In office 22 May 2019 – 20 July 2021

Personal details
- Died: 20 July 2021
- Citizenship: South Africa
- Party: African National Congress

Ncediwe Faith Nobevu-Booi (died 20 July 2021) was a South African politician who represented the African National Congress (ANC) in the Eastern Cape Provincial Legislature from May 2019 until her death in July 2021. She was elected to her legislative seat in the 2019 general election, ranked 32nd on the ANC's provincial party list.

She died in a car accident on 20 July 2021. Her seat in the legislature was filled by Kesava Pillai Anikumar the following month.
