= Vumile Lwana =

South African politician

Vumile Lwana MPL

Member of the Eastern Cape Provincial Legislature
- Incumbent
- Assumed office 9 September 2014

Executive Mayor of Makana
- In office June 2009 – May 2011
- Preceded by: Pumelelo Kate
- Succeeded by: Zamuxolo Peter
- In office December 2000 – March 2006
- Preceded by: Position established
- Succeeded by: Pumelelo Kate

Personal details
- Born: Grahamstown; Cape Province, South Africa
- Party: African National Congress

Vumile Gladman Lwana is a South African politician who has represented the African National Congress (ANC) in the Eastern Cape Provincial Legislature since September 2014. He was formerly the Mayor of Makana Local Municipality from 2000 to 2006 and from 2009 to 2011.

== Early life and career ==
Lwana was born and raised in Grahamstown in the former Cape Province and matriculated at Nathaniel Nyaluza Senior Secondary School in the 1980s. He formerly worked in the non-governmental sphere through developmental organisation Masifunde, which he joined as a programmes coordinator in 1989 and led as director from 1994. From 1999 to 2000 he chaired the Eastern Cape NGO Coalition.

== Career in local government ==
In the local elections of December 2000, Lwana was elected to represent the ANC as a councillor in the newly formed Makana Local Municipality. After the election, he was elected as the municipality's inaugural executive mayor. Following a full term in the mayoral office, he was succeeded by Pumelelo Kate after the 2006 local elections.

Lwana subsequently served as an ANC councillor in the Cacadu District Municipality. However, in June 2009, Kate resigned as Makana Mayor at the ANC's request, and Lwana returned to the mayoral office; in a secret ballot held on 23 June, he received the support of 12 of the 24 councillors. He narrowly beat the opposition candidate, the Democratic Alliance's Michael Whisson, who received 11 votes, including at least seven from the ANC itself. His second term as mayor lasted until the 2011 local elections, after which he was succeeded by Zamuxolo Peter.

== Legislative career ==
In the 2014 general election, Lwana stood for election as a Member of the Provincial Legislature, but he was ranked 46th on the ANC's provincial party list for the Eastern Cape and therefore did not initially secure a seat. He was sworn in to the provincial legislature on 9 September 2014, filling a casual vacancy arising from the resignation of Phila Nkayi. He was elected to his first full term in the legislature in the 2019 general election, ranked 36th on the ANC's party list.
