= Nelson Mampofu =

South African politician

Nelson Mampofu MPL

Member of the Eastern Cape Provincial Legislature
- Incumbent
- Assumed office 22 June 2021
- Preceded by: Veliswa Mvenya

Personal details
- Born: Nelson Madod'Odwa Mampofu
- Party: African Transformation Movement

Nelson Madod'Odwa Mampofu is a South African politician who has been a Member of the Eastern Cape Provincial Legislature since June 2021, representing the African Transformation Movement.

In April 2019, Mampofu was serving as the chairperson of the ATM in Alfred Nzo District Municipality. He was the party's provincial head of elections for the 2021 local government elections in the Eastern Cape.
