= Xolani Malamlela =

South African politician

Xolani Malamlela MPL

Member of the Eastern Cape Provincial Legislature
- Incumbent
- Assumed office 22 May 2019

Personal details
- Citizenship: South Africa
- Party: African National Congress
- Other political affiliations: Congress of South African Trade Unions

Xolani Malamlela is a South African politician and trade unionist who has represented the African National Congress (ANC) in the Eastern Cape Provincial Legislature since 2019. He also serves as the Provincial Secretary of the Congress of South African Trade Unions (Cosatu) in the Eastern Cape.

== Political career ==
In the 2014 general election, he stood for election to the national Parliament but was ranked 157th on the ANC's national party list and did not secure election to a seat. In the next general election in 2019, he was ranked 21st on the ANC's provincial party list and was elected to a seat in the Eastern Cape Provincial Legislature. After the election, he was elected to chair the legislature's Portfolio Committee on Roads and Transport.

Malamlela is a former Provincial Secretary of the National Education, Health and Allied Workers' Union, a Cosatu affiliate. As of 2022, he was Provincial Secretary of Cosatu, a close ANC ally.
