= Tamara Xhanti =

South African politician

Tamara Xhanti MPL

Member of the Eastern Cape Provincial Legislature
- Incumbent
- Assumed office 2009 or earlier

Personal details
- Citizenship: South Africa
- Party: African National Congress

Ntombizodwa Tamara Xhanti is a South African politician who has represented the African National Congress (ANC) in the Eastern Cape Provincial Legislature for over a decade. She is a prominent member of the ANC's branch in Nelson Mandela Bay.

Xhanti was elected to the provincial legislature in the 2009 general election, ranked 30th on the ANC's provincial party list, and was re-elected in the 2014 general election, ranked 27th. After the 2014 election, she was elected to chair the legislature's Portfolio Committee on Transport. Her most recent term in the legislature began after the 2019 general election, in which she was ranked 30th on the ANC's party list.
