= Fundisile Bese =

South African politician

Fundisile Bese MPL

Member of the Eastern Cape Provincial Legislature
- Incumbent
- Assumed office 22 May 2019

Personal details
- Citizenship: South Africa
- Party: African National Congress
- Education: University of the Free State (PhD)

David Fundisile Bese is a South African politician who has represented the African National Congress (ANC) in the Eastern Cape Provincial Legislature since 2019. He was elected to his seat in the 2019 general election, ranked 23rd on the ANC's provincial party list. He holds a PhD in sustainable agriculture from the University of the Free State and chairs the legislature's Portfolio Committee on Rural Development and Agrarian Reform.
