= Zolile Williams =

South African politician (born 1973)

Member of the Executive Council for Cooperative Governance and Traditional Affairs
- Incumbent
- Assumed office 16 August 2022
- Premier: Oscar Mabuyane
- Preceded by: Xolile Nqatha

Member of the Eastern Cape Provincial Legislature
- Incumbent
- Assumed office 15 August 2022

Provincial Treasurer of the African National Congress in the Eastern Cape
- Incumbent
- Assumed office May 2022
- Chairperson: Oscar Mabuyane
- Preceded by: Babalo Madikizela

Personal details
- Born: 30 July 1973 (age 53) Lady Grey, Cape Province; South Africa
- Party: African National Congress

Zolile Albert Williams (born 30 July 1973) is a South African politician who is currently serving as the Eastern Cape's Member of the Executive Council (MEC) for Cooperative Governance and Traditional Affairs. He was appointed to that position in August 2022, several weeks after he was elected Provincial Treasurer of the Eastern Cape branch of his political party, the African National Congress (ANC).

Williams is from Lady Grey in the present-day Eastern Cape. Until 2022, Williams served for two decades as the municipal manager at the Joe Gqabi District Municipality. The Business Day said that during Williams's tenure Joe Gqabi was "one of the Eastern Cape’s best-performing municipalities in terms of audit outcomes" and Oscar Mabuyane, the Premier of the Eastern Cape, called Williams "a serial achiever of clean audits". He was elected to the ANC Provincial Treasurer office at a party elective conference in May 2022, beating Andile Lungisa with 799 votes to Lungisa's 673. He did not appear on the draft ballot paper but was nominated for the position from the floor of the conference. He was viewed as belonging to a slate of candidates aligned to Oscar Mabuyane, who won re-election as ANC Provincial Chairperson at the same conference.

After his election to the ANC position, Williams said that he would resign from his municipal job in order to comply with South African law, which prohibited municipal managers from holding party-political office. On 15 August 2022, he was sworn in as an ordinary Member of the Eastern Cape Provincial Legislature. He filled a casual vacancy arising from the resignation of Babalo Madikizela, whom he had also succeeded as ANC Provincial Treasurer. The following day, Mabuyane announced a reshuffle of the provincial government, appointing Williams to succeed Xolile Nqatha as MEC for Cooperative Governance and Traditional Affairs.
