= Mxolisi Dimaza =

South African politician

Mxolisi Dimaza MPL

Member of the Eastern Cape Provincial Legislature
- Incumbent
- Assumed office 2009 or earlier

Personal details
- Citizenship: South Africa
- Party: African National Congress

Mxolisi Mackson Dimaza is a South African politician and former trade unionist who has represented the African National Congress (ANC) in the Eastern Cape Provincial Legislature for over a decade. He was formerly the Provincial Secretary of the South African Democratic Teachers' Union in the Eastern Cape.

== Political career ==
Dimaza was Provincial Secretary of SADTU in the 2000s. He was elected to an ANC seat in the Eastern Cape Provincial Legislature in the 2009 general election, ranked 37th on the ANC's provincial party list; he was re-elected in the 2014 general election, ranked 12th, and in the 2019 general election, ranked 40th. During his second and third terms in the legislature, he chaired the Portfolio Committee on Health, including during the COVID-19 pandemic.

In early 2021, Dimaza was considered a frontrunner to succeed Sindiswa Gomba as the Eastern Cape's Member of the Executive Council for Health. He was not appointed, but later that year he was elected to chair the legislature's Standing Committee on Public Accounts.
