= Zilindile Vena =

South African politician

Zilindile Vena MPL

Provincial Chairperson of the Economic Freedom Fighters
- Incumbent
- Assumed office 6 November 2022
- Deputy: Mlamli Makhetha; Nokuthula Mlokoti
- Preceded by: Yazini Tetyana

Member of the Eastern Cape Provincial Legislature
- Incumbent
- Assumed office 28 February 2023

Personal details
- Party: Economic Freedom Fighters
- Profession: Politician

Zilindile Vena is a South African politician who has been a member of the Eastern Cape Provincial Legislature since 2023. He is the provincial chairperson of the Economic Freedom Fighters.

== Political career ==
Vena was elected as a councillor for the Economic Freedom Fighters in Nelson Mandela Bay in 2016. In October 2018, Vena unsuccessfully stood for provincial chairperson of the EFF at the party's provincial conference. He was elected to the EFF's Central Command Team at the party's National Peoples Assembly in December 2019.

Vena resigned as a councillor of Nelson Mandela Bay and was suspended from party activities in February 2020 after he was accused of raping a Nelson Mandela University student. Vena pleaded not guilty in February 2021, and he was acquitted of the charge in July 2022.

Vena was elected provincial chairperson of the EFF in November 2022, defeating incumbent Yazini Tetyana by 33 votes. He was sworn in as a member of the Eastern Cape Provincial Legislature on 28 February 2023, succeeding Tetyana who resigned in January.
