= Nozibele Nyalambisa =

South African politician

Nozibele Nyalambisa MPL

Member of the Eastern Cape Provincial Legislature
- Incumbent
- Assumed office 22 May 2019

Personal details
- Born: Nozibele Nyalambisa; 9 August 1973 (age 52)
- Party: African National Congress
- Occupation: Member of the Provincial Legislature
- Profession: Politician

Nozibele Nyalambisa is a South African politician serving as an African National Congress Member of the Eastern Cape Provincial Legislature since 2019.

== Political career ==
Nyalambisa had served as an African National Congress representative to the Amathole District Municipality from the Mbhashe Local Municipality.

Nyalambisa was ranked 37th on the ANC's candidates list for the Eastern Cape Provincial Legislature election on 8 May 2019. She was elected as the ANC won 44 seats. She was sworn as a member of the Eastern Cape Provincial Legislature on 22 May. She currently sits on the Rural Development and Agrarian Reform Committee and the Health Committee.
