= Yazini Tetyana =

South African politician

Member of the National Assembly of South Africa
- In office 15 March 2023 – 9 January 2025

Member of the Eastern Cape Provincial Legislature
- In office 22 May 2019 – 18 February 2023

Personal details
- Party: Economic Freedom Fighters
- Education: Dalindyebo High School
- Alma mater: University of KwaZulu-Natal

Yazini Tetyana is a South African politician who served in the Eastern Cape Provincial Legislature from 2019 until 2023 and then in the National Assembly of South Africa from March 2023 to January 2025. Tetyana was the provincial chairperson of the EFF from 2018 until 2022.

== Background ==
Tetyana was born in the Candu location outside Idutywa. He matriculated from Dalindyebo High School and studied for a degree in political science at the University of KwaZulu-Natal.

== Political career ==
In October 2018, Tetyana was elected chairperson of the EFF in the Eastern Cape. He had previously been the convenor of the provincial structure after its disbanding. In the 2019 election, Tetyana was elected to represent the EFF in the Eastern Cape Provincial Legislature.

At the EFF's provincial conference in November 2022, Tetyana was defeated by former Nelson Mandela Bay councillor Zilindile Vena in the election for provincial chairperson of the EFF.

Tetyana resigned from the provincial legislature on 18 January 2023. He said that his resignation was not related to his unsuccessful bid for re-election at the party's provincial conference in November 2022. Tetyana added that he would remain a member of the EFF.

== Parliamentary career ==
On 15 March 2023, Tetyana was sworn in as a Member of the National Assembly of South Africa. Tetyana was elected to his first full term as an MP in the 2024 general election.

Tetyana resigned from the National Assembly on 9 January 2025.
