= Mlindi Nhanha =

South African politician and businessman

Mlindi Nhanha MP

Permanent Delegate to the National Council of Provinces from the Eastern Cape
- Incumbent
- Assumed office 23 May 2019

Member of the National Assembly of South Africa
- In office 6 May 2009 – 6 May 2014

Personal details
- Born: Mlindi Advent Nhanha; 3 July 1969
- Party: Democratic Alliance (2016–present)
- Other political affiliations: Congress of the People (2008–2014); African National Congress (Before 2008)
- Spouse: Vatiswa
- Profession: Politician

Mlindi Advent Nhanha (born 3 July 1969) is a South African politician and businessman from the Eastern Cape who has served as a permanent delegate to the National Council of Provinces since 2019. Nhanha is a member of the Democratic Alliance.

Nhanha had previously been a member of the African National Congress before joining the Congress of the People. He served as a COPE Member of Parliament during the Fourth Parliament (2009–2014).

== Background ==
Nhanha was involved in anti-apartheid activities and held leadership positions in the Alice Student Congress, the Border Student Congress, the South African Youth Congress, the African National Congress as well as the party's youth wing, the African National Congress Youth League.

== Parliamentary career ==
Nhanha left the ANC following the party's 2007 Polokwane Conference where Jacob Zuma was elected party president, saying the ANC had lost its way. He subsequently joined the Congress of the People, a breakaway party formed by disgruntled anti-Zuma ANC members. Nhanha stood as one of the party's parliamentary candidates in the 2009 general elections and was elected to the National Assembly, the lower house of parliament. In November 2010, Minister of Rural Development and Land Reform Gugile Nkwinti dismissed nepotism allegations levelled against him by Nhanha "with contempt".

Considering Nhanha was not a COPE parliamentary candidate for the 2014 general elections, he delivered his farewell speech to the National Assembly on 13 March 2014.

== Joining the Democratic Alliance ==
Nhanha joined the Democratic Alliance in the run-up to the 2016 local government elections and was unveiled as a DA councillor candidate for the Makana Local Municipality during a press briefing on 24 May 2016. During the press briefing, Nhanha revealed that halfway through his term as a Member of Parliament, he had approached the DA about defecting to them. He was elected to the Makana Municipal Council as a DA representative in the local elections and subsequently elected as DA caucus leader.

=== Return to Parliament ===
Following the 2019 general elections, the DA retained its one seat in the Eastern Cape provincial delegation to the National Council of Provinces, the upper house of parliament, and selected Nhanha to take up the seat. He was sworn in on 23 May 2019.

During the Debate on the 2023 State of Nation Address on 15 February 2023, Nhanha was booed by MPs for saying in his speech that "Apartheid was bad… but not everything was bad about apartheid" and that the apartheid government left the country with "well-established and functioning SOEs". He went to criticise the ANC government for the decline of various state-owned enterprises before lambasting the government for enhancing the "unfounded" stereotypes about black people not being able to govern a country.

Nhanha and DA MPL Vicky Knoetze were elected as the deputy provincial leaders of the DA in the Eastern Cape at the party's provincial conference in February 2023.

== Attempted murder charges ==
On 6 April 2021, Nhanha appeared in the Alice Magistrate's Court on attempted murder charges after he was arrested for having shot at his brother-in-law Mxolisi Daniel during an altercation at Daniel's homestead in the Dyamala Location outside Alice in the Eastern Cape on 4 April. Daniel later withdrew the charges, saying that he and Nhanha "resolved their differences". Nhanha was released on R500 bail as the case was postponed to 7 June 2021. The National Prosecuting Authority said that it would study the case docket on whether or not to proceed with the case; they withdrew the charges against him on 10 June.
