= Mpumelelo Saziwa =

South African politician

Mpumelelo Saziwa MPL

Member of the Eastern Cape Provincial Legislature
- Incumbent
- Assumed office 21 May 2014

Personal details
- Citizenship: South Africa
- Party: African National Congress
- Other political affiliations: Congress of South African Trade Unions; South African Communist Party

Mpumelelo Saziwa is a South African politician and trade unionist who has represented the African National Congress (ANC) in the Eastern Cape Provincial Legislature since 2014. He also serves as the Deputy Provincial Chairperson of the South African Communist Party (SACP) in the Eastern Cape and he was formerly the Provincial Chairperson of the Congress of South African Trade Unions (Cosatu).

== Political career ==
Saziwa was formerly the Deputy Provincial Chairperson and then the Provincial Chairperson of Cosatu in the Eastern Cape; he represented the South African Democratic Teachers' Union in the congress.

In the 2014 general election, while he was still serving as Cosatu provincial chair, Saziwa was elected to an ANC seat in the Eastern Cape Provincial Legislature, ranked 40th on the ANC's provincial party list. He was re-elected to the provincial legislature in the 2019 general election, ranked 33rd. After the 2019 election, he was also elected to chair the legislature's Portfolio Committee on Education.

Saziwa is also the Deputy Provincial Chairperson of the SACP in the Eastern Cape, serving under Provincial Chairperson Mzoleli Mrara; he was re-elected unopposed to that position in June 2022.
