= Mlamli Makhetha =

South African politician

Member of the Eastern Cape Provincial Legislature
- In office 22 May 2019 – February 2023

Personal details
- Party: Economic Freedom Fighters

Mlamli Alfred Makhetha is a South African politician who served as a member of the Eastern Cape Provincial Legislature. He was previously deputy provincial chairperson of the Economic Freedom Fighters in the Eastern Cape and before that, the provincial secretary.

== Political career ==
At the EFF's provincial conference in October 2018, Makhetha was elected as the party's provincial secretary. He was elected to the Eastern Cape Provincial Legislature in the 2019 election.

Makhetha was elected as the deputy provincial chairperson of the EFF at the party's provincial conference held in November 2022, however, shortly afterwards Makhetha was forced out of his position and replaced with Nokuthula Mlokoti after the EFF War Council resolved to reconfigure the provincial leadership because no woman was elected to any of the contested positions and EFF president Julius Malema expressed his disappointment at the conference's results. He resigned from the provincial legislature in February 2023.
