= Kesava Pillai Anilkumar =

South African politician

Kesava Pillai Anilkumar MPL

Member of the Eastern Cape Provincial Legislature
- Incumbent
- Assumed office 30 August 2019

Personal details
- Party: African National Congress
- Occupation: Member of the Provincial Legislature
- Profession: Politician

Kesava Pillai Anilkumar is a South African educator and politician who has been a Member of the Eastern Cape Provincial Legislature since 30 August 2019. Anilkumar is a member of the African National Congress.

== Career ==
He worked for the Department of Education for 30 years. He was first employed as a teacher and later became head of the department.

== Political career ==
Anilkumar is a member of the African National Congress. Within the party's Rubusana region, he was chairperson and treasurer. He was a member of the party's subcommittee on education. Anilkumar also served on the provincial committee of South African Democratic Teachers Union (SADTU).

On 30 August 2019, he was sworn in as a member of the Eastern Cape Provincial Legislature, filling the seat made vacant by the death of Ncediwe Nobevu-Booi in July 2019.
