= Thabo Matiwane =

South African politician

Thabo Matiwane MPL

Member of the Eastern Cape Provincial Legislature
- Incumbent
- Assumed office 22 May 2019

Personal details
- Citizenship: South Africa
- Party: African National Congress

Thabo Matiwane is a South African politician and former public servant who has represented the African National Congress (ANC) in the Eastern Cape Provincial Legislature since 2019. A former ANC Youth League activist, he previously worked in public administration and as a local councillor in Mnquma Local Municipality in the Eastern Cape.

== Early career ==
Matiwane was a member of the National Executive Committee of the ANC Youth League until December 2006, when the league's leadership corps, then headed by Fikile Mbalula, was disbanded by the national party. In November 2008, he was one of six ANC politicians in the Eastern Cape who announced that they had resigned from the party. Their resignations were linked to the outcomes of the ANC's 52nd National Conference, held the previous year, at which Thabo Mbeki had failed to gain re-election as ANC president; at least some of those who resigned joined the Congress of the People (COPE), a breakaway party formed by Mbeki's allies.

From 2012 to 2016, Matiwane was acting head of housing at Buffalo City Metropolitan Municipality. He was suspended from the position amid a scandal about alleged procurement irregularities in a municipal construction project, and he resigned permanently on 22 September 2016, saying that the related disciplinary proceedings had "dragged on for far too long".

In 2017, Matiwane was elected to the Provincial Executive Committee of the ANC's Eastern Cape branch. After his election, a member of his local party branch in Mnquma submitted a complaint to the ANC, alleging that Matiwane had left the ANC for COPE in 2008 and therefore was ineligible to sit on the ANC Provincial Executive Committee. In parallel to his party office, Matiwane represented the ANC as a local councillor in Mnquma Local Municipality. In March 2018, the ANC designated him as its preferred candidate to serve as Mayor of Mnquma, but he failed to gain election after several ANC councillors refused to comply with the party's instruction to vote for him.

== Legislative career ==
In the 2019 general election, Matiwane was elected to a seat in the Eastern Cape Provincial Legislature, ranked 26th on the ANC's party list. He was not re-elected to the ANC Provincial Executive Committee in 2022, but he served as spokesperson on the regional executive of the ANC's Amathole branch.
