= Makhaya Twabu =

South African politician

Makhaya Twabu MPL

Member of the Eastern Cape Provincial Legislature
- Incumbent
- Assumed office 22 May 2019

Mayor of Mbizana
- In office 2013–2016
- Succeeded by: Daniswa Mafumbatha

Personal details
- Citizenship: South Africa
- Party: African National Congress

Makhaya Merriman Twabu is a South African politician who has represented the African National Congress (ANC) in the Eastern Cape Provincial Legislature since 2019. He was formerly the Mayor of Mbizana Local Municipality.

== Political career ==
Twabu was formerly the Speaker of Alfred Nzo District Municipality and served as the mayor of Mbizana until the 2011 local elections. He returned to the mayoral office in mid-2013, when the ANC sought to overhaul the municipal leadership. At that time Mbizana was the poorest municipality in the Eastern Cape. He left office again after the 2016 local elections.

In the 2019 general election, he was elected to an ANC seat in the Eastern Cape Provincial Legislature, ranked 38th on the ANC's provincial party list. At the time of his election, he was serving as a Member of the Mayoral Committee in Alfred Nzo.
