= Mandlakazi Keleku =

South African politician

Mandlakazi Keleku MPL

Member of the Eastern Cape Provincial Legislature
- Incumbent
- Assumed office 22 May 2019

Personal details
- Citizenship: South Africa
- Party: African National Congress

Mandlakazi Keleku is a South African politician who has represented the African National Congress (ANC) in the Eastern Cape Provincial Legislature since 2019. She was elected to her seat in the 2019 general election, ranked 44th on the ANC's provincial party list. She is also a member of the ANC Women's League in the Chris Hani region.
