= Theo Coetzee =

South African politician (1948–2023)

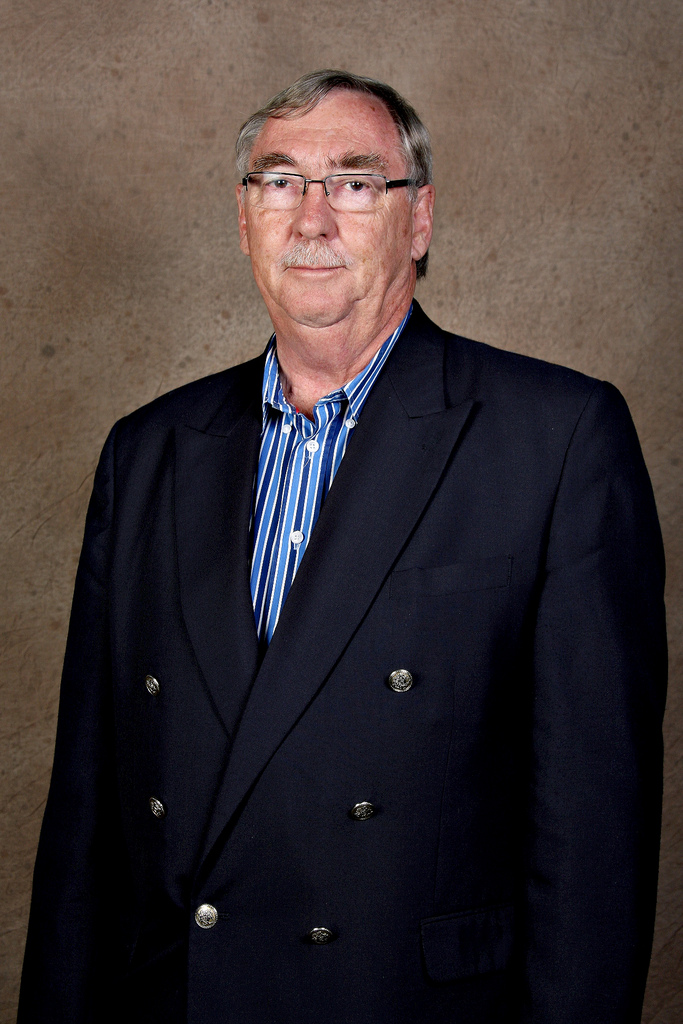
- Coetzee in 2011

Member of the Eastern Cape Provincial Legislature
- In office 22 May 2019 – 3 January 2023

Member of the National Assembly of South Africa
- In office 6 May 2009 – 6 May 2014

Personal details
- Born: Theo Willem Coetzee; 7 July 1948
- Died: 3 January 2023 (aged 74) Gqeberha, Eastern Cape, South Africa
- Party: Freedom Front Plus (2014–2023)
- Other political affiliations: Democratic Alliance (Until 2014)
- Spouse: Magda (Until 2023; his death)
- Children: 3
- Education: University of the Free State (BA)

Theo Willem Coetzee (7 July 1948 – 3 January 2023) was a South African politician. He served as a member of the National Assembly of South Africa for the Democratic Alliance from 2009 until his defection to the Freedom Front Plus ahead of the 2014 general election. From 2019 Coetzee was the sole representative of the Freedom Front Plus in the Eastern Cape Provincial Legislature.

== Early life and education ==
Coetzee was born on 7 July 1948. He graduated from the University of the Free State with a Bachelor of Arts.

== Career ==
Coetzee was considered an expert in the field of credit management. He served as a member of Bloem Water and Chairperson of the Financial and Audit Committee from 2001 to 2004. Coetzee was also a member of the Board of Trustees of Federated Timber's pension fund.

== Political career ==
Coetzee was a councillor for the Democratic Alliance in the Mangaung Local Municipality from 1995 until his election to the National Assembly of South Africa in 2009.

Following his swearing-in as an MP, Coetzee was appointed by DA parliamentary leader Athol Trollip as Shadow Deputy Minister of Agriculture, Forestry and Fisheries. He later became Shadow Minister of State Security in June 2009. Coetzee was named to the Joint Standing Committee on Intelligence in August 2009. In a shadow cabinet reshuffle done by Trollip in 2010, Coetzee was demoted to Shadow Deputy Minister of State Security to Shadow Minister Dirk Stubbe. He remained in the position following Lindiwe Mazibuko's election as DA parliamentary leader in 2011.

Prior to the 2014 general election, Coetzee was one of three DA MPs who joined the Freedom Front Plus and subsequently stood as parliamentary candidates for the party. Coetzee was ranked 18th on the party's national list; he was not re-elected to parliament at the election.

Coetzee stood as a candidate for the FF Plus in the 2019 general election and was elected to the Eastern Cape Provincial Legislature as the FF Plus won one seat.

== Personal life ==
Coetzee was married to Magda. They had three sons.

Coetzee died from cancer in Gqeberha on 3 January 2023, at the age of 74.
