= Bobby Stevenson =

South African politician

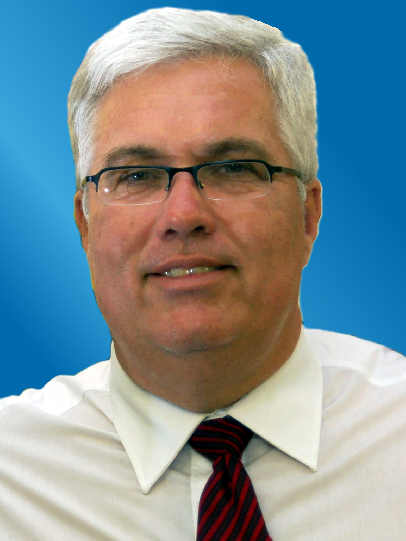

Deputy Leader of the Democratic Alliance in the Eastern Cape
- In office 2007 – 25 February 2023 Serving with Chantel King

Member of the Eastern Cape Provincial Legislature
- In office June 1999 – 28 May 2024

Personal details
- Born: Robert Sykes Stevenson; 18 February 1959 (age 67) Port Elizabeth, Cape Province, South Africa
- Party: Democratic Alliance
- Other political affiliations: Democratic; Progressive Federal Party
- Occupation: Member of the Provincial Legislature
- Profession: Politician

Robert Sykes Stevenson (born 18 February 1959), known as Bobby Stevenson, is a South African politician who served as the leader of the official opposition in the Eastern Cape Provincial Legislature. Stevenson was elected to the Eastern Cape Provincial Legislature in 1999 and retired from it in 2024. He was the deputy provincial leader of the Democratic Alliance from 2007 until 2023.

== Biography ==
Stevenson was born 19 February 1959 in Port Elizabeth, then part of South Africa's Cape Province. He joined the Progressive Federal Party. In 1988, Stevenson was elected to the Port Elizabeth municipal council. He was the youngest councillor at that time. He then joined the Democratic Party.

Stevenson was elected to the Eastern Cape Provincial Legislature in the 1999 provincial election. He is one of the legislature's longest-serving members. Stevenson is currently the chief whip of the official opposition.

The Democratic Party became the Democratic Alliance in 2000. Stevenson has been the deputy provincial leader of the party since 2007 and a member of the provincial executive committee since 2000. He also serves on the party's Federal Council, Federal Finance Committee and Federal Candidates Election Committee. Stevenson is the leader of the Port Elizabeth South West constituency.

Stevenson was re-elected for a fifth term as deputy provincial leader at the party's virtual provincial congress in August 2020. He now serves alongside Member of Parliament Chantel King. Stevenson did not run for re-election at the party's provincial conference in February 2023.

In early-March 2024, Stevenson announced that he would be retiring from politics at the general elections on 29 May 2024.
