= Sweetness Mbonyana =

South African politician

Sweetness Mbonyana MPL

Member of the Eastern Cape Provincial Legislature
- Incumbent
- Assumed office 22 May 2019

Personal details
- Citizenship: South Africa
- Party: African National Congress

Sigqibokazi Sweetness Mbonyana is a South African politician who has represented the African National Congress (ANC) in the Eastern Cape Provincial Legislature since 2019. She was elected to her legislative seat in the 2019 general election, ranked 24th on the ANC's provincial party list.

Mbonyana is a member of the ANC's regional branch in Joe Gqabi District. In 2022, ahead of the ANC's 55th National Conference, she was nominated by 199 local party branches to stand for election to the ANC's National Executive Committee; by number of branch nominations received, she was ranked 123rd of all candidates for the 80 ordinary seats on the committee. She was not elected to a seat.
