= Tumeka Gaya =

South African politician

Tumeka Gaya MPL

Member of the Eastern Cape Provincial Legislature
- Incumbent
- Assumed office 22 May 2019

Personal details
- Citizenship: South Africa
- Party: African National Congress

Tumeka Gaya is a South African politician who has represented the African National Congress (ANC) in the Eastern Cape Provincial Legislature since 2019. She was elected to her seat in the 2019 general election, ranked 18th on the ANC's provincial party list.
