= Mayor of Nelson Mandela Bay =

- Incumbent; Babalwa Lobishe since 31 October 2024
- Style: The Honourable
- Residence: No official residence
- Seat: City Hall, 1st floor, Vusi Dlamini Square, Central, Gqeberha, 6000
- Appointer: Nelson Mandela Bay Municipal Council
- Formation: 2000
- First holder: Nceba Faku
- Website: Official website

The Mayor of Nelson Mandela Bay, officially the Executive Mayor of the Nelson Mandela Bay Metropolitan Municipality, is the head of the local government of South Africa's Nelson Mandela Bay Metropolitan Municipality, established in 2000.

The current mayor of Nelson Mandela Bay is Babalwa Lobishe of the African National Congress (ANC), who was elected unopposed on 31 October 2024. She succeeded Gary van Niekerk of the National Alliance (NA), who was elected on 26 May 2023. He succeeded Retief Odendaal of the Democratic Alliance (DA), who was removed in a motion of no confidence earlier that day.

== List of mayors ==
Name	Term of office		Political party	Ref.
Christopher Nceba Faku	2001	2006	African National Congress	
Nondumiso Maphazi	2006	2009	African National Congress	
Zanoxolo Wayile	2009	2013	African National Congress	
Ben Fihla	2013	2015	African National Congress	
Danny Jordaan	2015	2016	African National Congress	
Athol Trollip	2016	2018	Democratic Alliance	
Mongameli Bobani	2018	2019	United Democratic Movement	
Tshonono Buyeye (acting)	2019	2020	African Independent Congress	
Nqaba Bhanga	2020	2021	Democratic Alliance	
Eugene Johnson	2021	2022	African National Congress	
Retief Odendaal	2022	2023	Democratic Alliance	
Gary van Niekerk	2023	2024	National Alliance	
Babalwa Lobishe	2024	Incumbent	African National Congress	
