= Piet Mey =

South African politician

Piet Mey MPL

Member of the Eastern Cape Provincial Legislature
- Incumbent
- Assumed office 14 June 2024

Member of the National Assembly of South Africa
- In office 22 May 2019 – 28 May 2024

Personal details
- Born: Pieter Mey; 17 December 1948 (age 77) Willowmore, Cape Province, Union of South Africa
- Party: Freedom Front Plus
- Spouse: Elizabeth Anne
- Children: 3
- Education: University of Port Elizabeth
- Profession: Politician

Pieter Mey (born 17 December 1948) is a South African politician and former police lieutenant who was elected to the Eastern Cape Provincial Legislature in the 2024 general election. A member of the Freedom Front Plus, he serves as the party's leader in the Eastern Cape. Mey had previously served as a Member of the National Assembly of South Africa from 2019 until 2024.

== Early life and education ==
Mey was born in 1948 in the town of Willowmore in the Union of South Africa. He matriculated from Willowmore High School in 1966. He obtained a B.Iuris degree in law from the University of Port Elizabeth.

== Career ==
Mey joined the South African Police in 1966. He served in Pretoria, Johannesburg, Lusikisiki, Port Elizabeth and Western Area. He resigned from the police force in 1980 with the rank of lieutenant and started working in the real estate industry.

=== Politics ===
Mey was later appointed leader of the Freedom Front Plus in the Eastern Cape. In 2014 he stood for election to the South African National Assembly. He was not elected.

In 2019 Mey stood for the National Assembly again. This time he was successful in his bid. He served on the Portfolio Committee on Transport and the Portfolio Committee on Environment, Forestry and Fisheries.

Mey was elected to the Eastern Cape Provincial Legislature in the 2024 provincial election.

== Personal life ==
Mey is married to Elizabeth Anne, and has three children.
