= Koliswa Vimbayo =

South African politician

Koliswa Vimbayo MPL

Member of the Eastern Cape Provincial Legislature
- Incumbent
- Assumed office 22 May 2019

Personal details
- Citizenship: South Africa
- Party: African National Congress

Koliswa Vimbayo is a South African politician who has represented the African National Congress (ANC) in the Eastern Cape Provincial Legislature since 2019. Until 2019, she was the Mayor of Chris Hani District Municipality.

== Political career ==
Vimbayo was formerly the Executive Mayor of Chris Hani and the Regional Chairperson of the ANC's branch in the area. She lost the latter position at a regional party conference in August 2018, when Wongama Gela won election to the position, securing 144 votes against Vimbayo's 29. The following year, in the 2019 general election, Vimbayo was elected to an ANC seat in the Eastern Cape Provincial Legislature, ranked 35th on the ANC's provincial party list.
