= Tony Duba =

South African politician

Tony Duba MPL

Member of the Eastern Cape Provincial Legislature
- Incumbent
- Assumed office 21 May 2014

Personal details
- Born: Tony Duba
- Party: African National Congress
- Occupation: Member of the Provincial Legislature
- Profession: Politician

Tony Duba is a South African politician who is serving as a Member of the Eastern Cape Provincial Legislature since May 2014. He was named deputy chair of committees in May 2019. Duba is a member of the African National Congress.

== Political career ==
Duba was elected to the Eastern Cape Provincial Legislature in May 2014. He was sworn in as a member on 21 May. During his first term, he sat on the committees on social development, oversight, and finance and provincial expenditure.

Following his re-election in May 2019, he was named deputy chair of committees. On 3 June, he received his committee assignments. Duba now sits on the committees on economic development, environmental affairs & tourism and education. He is also chair of the law review committee.
