= Loyiso Magqashela =

South African politician

Loyiso Magqashela MPL

Member of the Eastern Cape Provincial Legislature
- Incumbent
- Assumed office 22 May 2019

Personal details
- Citizenship: South Africa
- Party: African National Congress

Loyiso Magqashela is a South African politician who has represented the African National Congress (ANC) in the Eastern Cape Provincial Legislature since 2019. He was elected to his seat in the 2019 general election, ranked 14th on the ANC's provincial party list. He was also named as the Chief Whip of the Majority Party in the legislature.

In May 2022, at a party provincial elective conference in Buffalo City, he was elected to a four-year term as a member of the Provincial Executive Committee of the ANC's provincial branch in the Eastern Cape. By number of votes received, he was ranked fifth of the 30 ordinary members elected to the committee. After the election, Magqashela was named as the party's provincial spokesperson.
