= Nomasikizi Konza =

South African politician

Nomasikizi Konza MPL

Member of the Eastern Cape Provincial Legislature
- Incumbent
- Assumed office 22 May 2019

Mayor of Amathole
- In office 2011–2016
- Preceded by: Sakhumzi Somyo
- Succeeded by: Khanyile Maneli

Personal details
- Citizenship: South Africa
- Party: African National Congress

Nomasikizi Hendrietta Konza is a South African politician who has represented the African National Congress (ANC) in the Eastern Cape Provincial Legislature since 2019. She was the Mayor of Amathole District Municipality from 2011 to 2016. In 2016, she was charged with defrauding the municipality but was acquitted of all charges in March 2019, shortly before her election to the provincial legislature.

== Early life and career ==
Konza was born in 1962 on a farm in Cathcart near the Kei River in the former Cape Province. A teacher by training, she was a founding member of the South African Democratic Teachers Union and was active in the anti-apartheid Mass Democratic Movement.

== Political career ==
From 1995 to 2019, she represented the ANC as a local councillor in the Eastern Cape. She was the Deputy Mayor of the Cathcart Transitional Local Council from 1995 to 2000 and then served as a Member of the Mayoral Committee in Amahlathi Local Municipality from 2000 to 2006. In August 2010, she was elected Speaker of the Amahlathi council after several other ANC councillors defected to the opposition Congress of the People.

The following year, after the 2011 local elections, she succeeded Samkhumzi Somyo as Executive Mayor of the Amatole District Municipality. She remained in office until 2016 but was not re-elected in the next elections in 2016.

=== Fraud trial: 2016–2018 ===
Months before the 2016 elections, in late May 2016, Konza and several others were arrested on fraud charges; she was released on R15,000 bail. The Hawks alleged that she and other municipal officials had misappropriated over R2.5 million in municipal funds between 2014 and 2015, under the guise of sponsoring Miss Amathole Heritage, a local beauty pageant. During the trial, the National Prosecuting Authority argued that she had "bullied" officials into authorising the payments. However, she and others were acquitted on all three counts of fraud in May 2019.

=== Provincial legislature: 2019–present ===
In the 2019 general election, Konza was elected to an ANC seat in the Eastern Cape Provincial Legislature, ranked 20th on the ANC's provincial party list.

== Personal life ==
Konza has been widowed since 1994; she has two children and a grandson.
