= Babalwa Lobishe =

South African politician

Councillor Babalwa Lobishe

Mayor of Nelson Mandela Bay
- Incumbent
- Assumed office 31 October 2024
- Preceded by: Gary van Niekerk

Deputy Mayor of Nelson Mandela Bay
- In office 26 May 2023 – 31 October 2024
- Succeeded by: Gary van Niekerk

Member of the Eastern Cape Provincial Legislature
- In office 22 May 2019 – May 2023

Personal details
- Citizenship: South Africa
- Party: African National Congress

Babalwa Lobishe is a South African politician who has been the executive mayor of Nelson Mandela bay since 2024. She represented the African National Congress (ANC) in the Eastern Cape Provincial Legislature from 2019 until 2023. In December 2021, she was additionally elected as Regional Chairperson of the ANC's branch in Nelson Mandela Bay.

== Political career ==
Lobishe formerly represented the ANC as a local councillor in the Nelson Mandela Bay Metropolitan Municipality, where she served as a Member of the Mayoral Committee under Mayors Ben Fihla and Danny Jordaan. She was elected to the Eastern Cape Provincial Legislature in the 2019 general election, ranked 29th on the ANC's provincial party list. Midway into the legislative term, ahead of the 2021 local elections, she was ranked first on the list of candidates nominated by ANC members to stand for election to the Nelson Mandela Bay council, which also made her a frontrunner for the mayoral candidacy; however, she retained her seat in the legislature rather than returning to local government.

In December 2021, Lobishe stood for election as Regional Chairperson of the ANC's branch in Nelson Mandela Bay, running against the former incumbent, Andile Lungisa. She was elected unopposed on 17 December after Lungisa withdrew from the race, saying that he supported the election of a woman to the position; She served alongside Regional Secretary Luyolo Nqakula and was deputised by Siphiwo Tshaka. According to the Mail & Guardian, she was generally viewed as a close ally of Eastern Cape Premier Oscar Mabuyane, who in turn was politically aligned to President Cyril Ramaphosa; however, in 2022 she supported Mlibo Qoboshiyane's unsuccessful bid to oust Mabuyane as ANC Provincial Chairperson.

On 26 May 2023, Lobishe was sworn in as an ANC councillor in Nelson Mandela Bay, replacing Makhi Feni. Lobishe had resigned from the provincial legislature in order to return to the Nelson Mandela Bay council. Hours after her swearing-in, she was elected deputy mayor of the municipality. Lobishe has been criticised for hosting a gala dinner to deliver her 2026 State of the Metro address for 700 invited guests despite residents struggling with potholes, sewage spills, electricity interrupts and water supply problems.
