= Monde Sondaba =

South African politician

Monde Sondaba MPL

Member of the Eastern Cape Provincial Legislature
- Incumbent
- Assumed office 22 May 2019

Personal details
- Citizenship: South Africa
- Party: African National Congress

Monde Sondaba is a South African politician and former public servant who has represented the African National Congress (ANC) in the Eastern Cape Provincial Legislature since 2019. He was elected to the legislature in the 2019 general election, ranked 43rd on the ANC's provincial party list; he also stood for election in 2014, but on that occasion was ranked 53rd on the party list and did not secure a seat.

Sondaba was formerly the municipal manager at Mhlontlo Local Municipality and at Mnquma Local Municipality. He also served as acting municipal manager at Ngqushwa Local Municipality in 2012.
