= Zinzi Rabe =

South African politician

Zinzi Rabe MPL

Member of the Eastern Cape Provincial Legislature
- Incumbent
- Assumed office 22 May 2019

Personal details
- Citizenship: South Africa
- Party: African National Congress

Zinziswa Ursula "Zinzi" Rabe is a South African politician who has represented the African National Congress (ANC) in the Eastern Cape Provincial Legislature since 2019. She was elected to her legislative seat in the 2019 general election, ranked 34th on the ANC's provincial party list. In 2022, ahead of the ANC's 55th National Conference, the ANC Youth League endorsed Rabe as a candidate for election to the party's National Executive Committee.
