= Retief Odendaal =

South African politician (born 1982)

Mayor of Nelson Mandela Bay
- In office 21 September 2022 – 26 May 2023
- Deputy: Khusta Jack
- Preceded by: Eugene Johnson
- Succeeded by: Gary van Niekerk

Mayoral Committee Member for Finance in Nelson Mandela Bay Metropolitan Municipality
- In office 18 August 2016 – 27 August 2018

Member of Eastern Cape Provincial Legislature
- In office 22 May 2019 – 4 August 2022

Personal details
- Born: 28 May 1982 (age 43) Port Elizabeth, Cape Province, South Africa
- Party: Democratic Alliance
- Spouse: Anne-Marie Potgieter (m. 2010)
- Children: 3

Retief Odendaal (born 28 May 1982) is a South African politician who served as the Mayor of Nelson Mandela Bay from 21 September 2022 until his removal in a motion of no confidence on 26 May 2023. Before serving as mayor, he was a Member of the Provincial Legislature in the Eastern Cape for the Democratic Alliance and was the Shadow Member of the Executive Council (MEC) for Finance, Rural Development and Agrarian Reform from May 2019 until August 2022.

== Early life and education ==
Retief was born in the coastal city of Port Elizabeth, Eastern Cape and attended Hoërskool Otto Du Plessis. He furthered his studies at Nelson Mandela University from 2001 to 2005. He obtained an LLB degree and did his articles at Delport, van Niekerk Attorneys. He is a practising attorney in Nelson Mandela Bay and a politician.

== Political career ==
Retief Odendaal joined the DA in 2004. He is a founding member of the DA Youth in Nelson Mandela Bay which was founded in 2004. He became the Ward 6 Councillor in Nelson Mandela Bay in 2009 and served as the councillor until the 2016 South African municipal elections. Odendaal was also the leader of the opposition in Nelson Mandela Bay from 2014 to 2016. In 2016 when the DA became the largest party in Nelson Mandela Bay he was chosen by then-mayor Athol Trollip to serve as a Mayoral Committee Member (MMC) for Finance in Nelson Mandela Bay. He served in that position until the DA was ousted in 2018 by the ANC and their coalition partners on the 27th August 2018.

Retief has been a member of the Democratic Alliance Federal Council since 2014 and was also elected as the chairperson of the Provincial Disciplinary Committee for the DA in the Eastern Cape. He also served as the deputy chairperson of the DA in the Eastern Cape from 2017 to 2019.

After the 2019 South African general election he was elected as a Member of the Provincial Legislature for the DA in the Eastern Cape Provincial Legislature. Shortly after the election, he was made the Shadow MEC for Finance, Rural Development and Agrarian Reform.

Odendaal was elected as a councillor of Nelson Mandela Bay in the 2021 municipal elections, however, he declined the position. Odendaal's absence from the inaugural council meeting on 22 November 2021 led to the DA mayoral candidate Nqaba Bhanga losing to the ANC mayoral candidate Eugene Johnson by one vote.

On 28 July 2022, the DA and other opposition parties signed a coalition agreement to remove the ANC-led alliance from power in Nelson Mandela Bay. The following day, Odendaal was announced as the DA's mayoral candidate for the metro. He resigned from the Provincial Legislature on 4 August 2022. On 21 September 2022 he was elected Executive Mayor of Nelson Mandela Bay. He was the youngest person ever elected as mayor in Nelson Mandela Bay history. Odendaal was removed as mayor in a motion of no confidence on 26 May 2023.

== Personal life ==
Retief is a fluent speaker of Afrikaans and English. Retief married Anne-Marie Potgieter on 24 September 2010 in Port Elizabeth (now Gqeberha). They have three children.
