= Elza van Lingen =

South African politician (1949–2018)

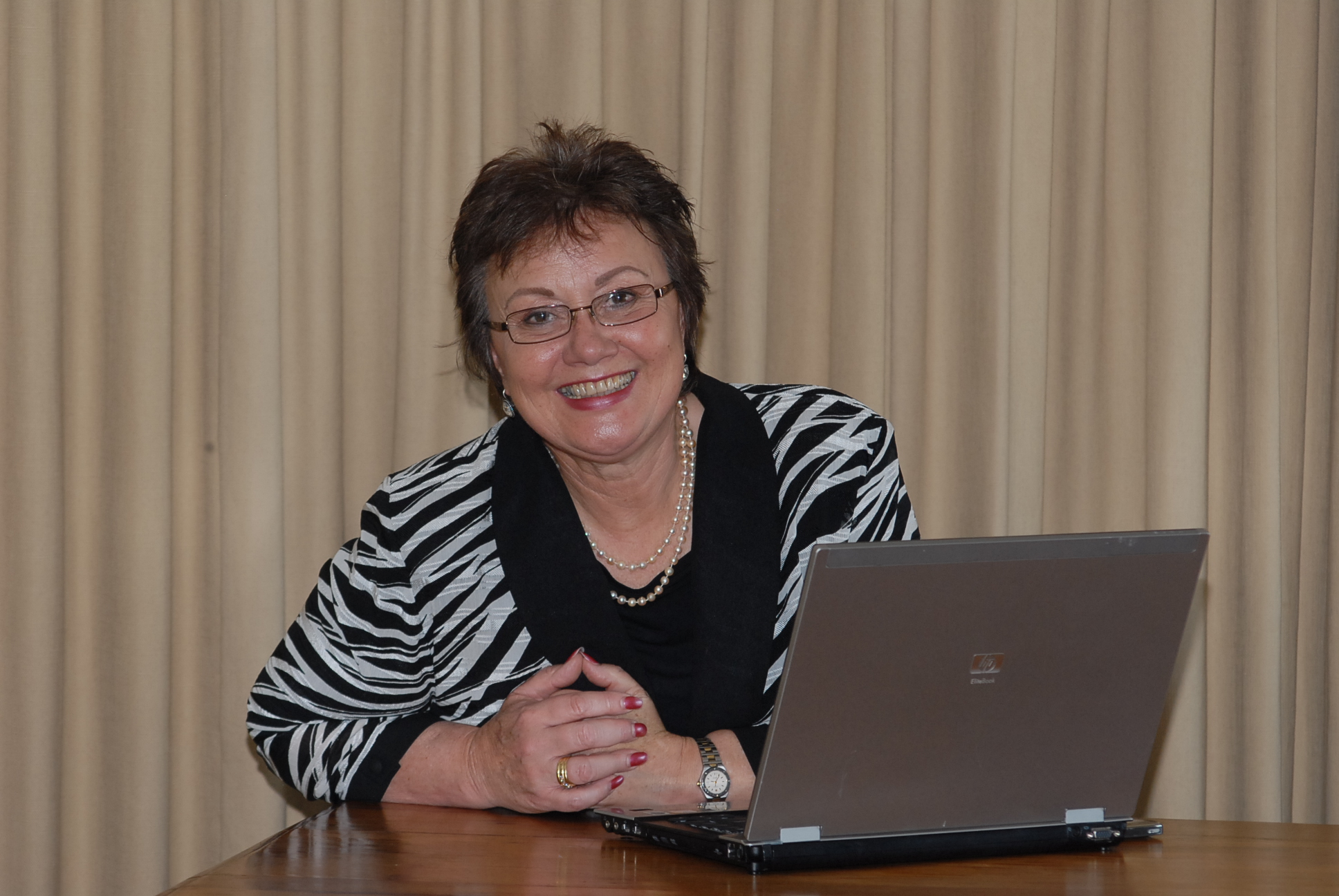
- Van Lingen in 2010

Mayor of the Kouga Local Municipality
- In office 17 August 2016 – 19 April 2018
- Preceded by: Daphne Kettledas
- Succeeded by: Horatio Hendricks

Permanent Delegate to the National Council of Provinces
- In office 6 May 2009 – August 2016

Personal details
- Born: 26 November 1949 Willowmore, Cape Province, Union of South Africa
- Died: 19 April 2018 (aged 68) Cape St. Francis, Eastern Cape, South Africa
- Party: Democratic Alliance (from 2002)
- Children: 2
- Profession: Politician

Elizabeth Christina "Elza" van Lingen (née Greeff; 26 November 1949 – 19 April 2018) was a South African politician. A member of the Democratic Alliance, she was elected a councillor of the Cacadu District Municipality in 2002. She was elected to the National Council of Provinces in 2009. Van Lingen became leader of the DA caucus in the NCOP in 2011, and was re-elected to the NCOP in 2014. From 2016 until her death, she served as the mayor of the Kouga Local Municipality.

== Early life and career ==
Van Lingen was born and grew up in Willowmore. She was employed as a public relations officer for KWV where she met Michael, her future husband. She married Michael and they ran a merino stud farm in Middelburg in the Eastern Cape, and farmed livestock and game. Van Lingen gave birth to Mick and Caroline and was the step mother of Robin and Lawrence. Van Lingen started a hospice in Middelburg, ran numerous development and training programmes and coordinated 120 sheep shearers in 12 teams to work throughout the region. She owned a clothing manufacturing business, a shoe store and a home industry business. She also had a real estate licence.

Van Lingen and her husband moved to Cape St. Francis in 2000 where they ran a guest house together. Her activism for improving the quality of water in the town earned her an invitation to the Cape St Francis Civic Association.

== Political career ==
Van Lingen had been approached to became involved in politics earlier in her life but she declined due to her children being young. After having been approached by the Democratic Alliance in 2002, she joined the party. She was elected a councillor of the Cacadu District Municipality that same year. After serving six years on the district council, Van Lingen was elected to the represent the DA in the National Council of Provinces as a permanent delegate from the Eastern Cape after the 2009 general election. Van Lingen was elected leader of the DA caucus in the NCOP in October 2011 following the departure of Watty Watson who was appointed chief whip of the DA in the National Assembly.

In January 2014, Van Lingen was criticised by ANC councillors in the Kouga Local Municipality for letters she sent to the media discussing issues in the municipality. She responded by saying that public representatives had the right to play an oversight role.

Following the 2014 general election, Van Lingen was reappointed to the NCOP by the DA in the Eastern Cape. She was also re-elected unopposed as the party's leader in the NCOP.

In March 2016, Van Lingen was announced as the DA's mayoral candidate for the Kouga Local Municipality. The party won control of the municipality with more than 57% of the vote in the local government elections held on 3 August that year. Van Lingen was elected as mayor during the first council meeting on 19 August 2016.

== Death ==
Van Lingen was diagnosed with breast cancer in 2009 but went into remission. She had to start treatment in 2016 again. Van Lingen died from it on 19 April 2018 at her home in Cape St. Francis. She had gone on sick leave on 16 April. Her party, the DA, paid tribute to her. A memorial service was held for her on 23 April 2018.
