= Nomvula Ponco =

South African politician

Nomvula Ponco MPL

Member of the Eastern Cape Provincial Legislature
- Incumbent
- Assumed office 3 June 2019
- In office 2009 – May 2019

Personal details
- Citizenship: South Africa
- Party: African National Congress

Alice Nomvula Ponco is a South African politician who has represented the African National Congress (ANC) in the Eastern Cape Provincial Legislature since 2009, excepting a fortnight's hiatus in 2019.

== Political career ==
She was elected to the legislature in the 2009 general election, ranked 42nd on the ANC's provincial party list, and re-elected in the 2014 general election, ranked 39th. In the next general election in 2019, she was placed 45th on the party list and therefore did not immediately secure election to one of the 44 seats won by the ANC; however, she was sworn in shortly after the election, on 3 June 2019, filling an early casual vacancy in the legislature.
