= Premier of the Eastern Cape =

- Incumbent; Oscar Mabuyane since 22 May 2019
- Style: The Honourable
- Appointer: Eastern Cape Provincial Legislature
- Term length: Five years, renewable once
- Inaugural holder: Raymond Mhlaba
- Formation: 7 May 1994
- Website: otp.ecpg.gov.za

The premier of the Eastern Cape is the head of government of the Eastern Cape province of South Africa. The current premier of the Eastern Cape is Oscar Mabuyane, a member of the African National Congress, who was elected in the 2019 election. He took office on 22 May 2019.

== Functions ==
In terms of the constitution, the executive authority of a province is entrusted in the premier. The premier appoints an Executive Council consisting of ten members of the provincial legislature; they are called members of the Executive Council (MECs). The MECs are primarily ministers and the Executive Council a cabinet at the provincial level. The premier has the authority to hire and dismiss MECs at his/her own will.

The premier and the Executive Council are responsible for implementing provincial legislation, along with any national legislation allotted to the province. They set provincial policy and manage the departments of the provincial government; their actions are subject to the national constitution.

In order for an act of the provincial legislature to officially become law, the premier must sign it. If he/she believes that the act is unconstitutional, it can be referred back to the legislature for reconsideration. If the premier and the legislature cannot agree, the act must be referred to the Constitutional Court for final consideration.

The premier is also ex officio a member of the National Council of Provinces, the upper house of Parliament, as one of the special delegates from the province.

== List ==
No.	Portrait	Name (Birth–Death)	Term of office			Political party
No.	Portrait	Name (Birth–Death)	Took office	Left office	Time in office	Political party
1		Raymond Mhlaba (1920–2005)	7 May 1994	4 February 1997	2 years, 273 days	African National Congress
2		Makhenkesi Stofile (1944–2016)	4 February 1997	26 April 2004	7 years, 82 days	African National Congress
3		Nosimo Balindlela (born 1949)	26 April 2004	25 July 2008	4 years, 90 days	African National Congress
4		Mbulelo Sogoni (born 1966)	25 July 2008	6 May 2009	285 days	African National Congress
5		Noxolo Kiviet (born 1963)	6 May 2009	21 May 2014	5 years, 15 days	African National Congress
6		Phumulo Masualle (born 1965)	21 May 2014	22 May 2019	5 years, 1 day	African National Congress
7		Oscar Mabuyane (born 1974)	22 May 2019	incumbent	7 years, 108 days	African National Congress

== Election ==
The election for the Eastern Cape Provincial Legislature is held every five years, simultaneously with the election of the National Assembly; the last such election occurred on 8 May 2019. At the first meeting of the provincial legislature after an election, the members choose the premier from amongst themselves. The provincial legislature can force the premier to resign by a motion of no confidence. If the premiership becomes vacant (for whatever reason) the provincial legislature must choose a new premier to serve out the period until the next election. One person cannot have served more than two five-year terms as premier; however, when a premier is chosen to fill a vacancy the time until the next election does not count as a term.

== See also ==
- Politics of the Eastern Cape
- Premier (South Africa)
- President of South Africa
- Politics of South Africa
