= Edmund van Vuuren =

Retired South African politician and educator

Member of the Eastern Cape Provincial Legislature
- In office 6 May 2009 – 30 April 2023

Personal details
- Born: 15 May 1956 (age 69) Port Elizabeth, Cape Province, Union of South Africa
- Party: Democratic Alliance (2000–2023)
- Spouse: Charmaine (died 2017)
- Children: 2
- Education: Paterson High School
- Alma mater: University of the Western Cape (BSc)
- Profession: Educator; Politician

Peter Edmund van Vuuren (born 15 May 1956) is a retired South African politician and educator who served as a Democratic Alliance member of the Eastern Cape Provincial Legislature from 2009 until 2023.

== Early life and education ==
Van Vuuren was born on 15 May 1956 in Port Elizabeth. He matriculated from Paterson High School in 1973 and obtained a Bachelor of Science and Higher Diploma in Education from the University of the Western Cape in 1979.

== Teaching career ==
Van Vuuren started his teaching career as a mathematics teacher responsible for teaching matriculants at Chapman Secondary School in Port Elizabeth. He was appointed principal of Hillside High School in 1992 and served in this position until his election to the Eastern Cape Provincial Legislature in 2009.

== Political career ==
Van Vuuren became a member of the Democratic Alliance in 2000. In 2006, he was elected a DA councillor of Nelson Mandela Bay. During his tenure on the city council, he served on the budget and treasury committee.

Van Vuuren successfully stood for election to the Eastern Cape Provincial Legislature as a DA representative in 2009. He was subsequently re-elected twice, in 2014 and in 2019.

On 3 May 2023, HeraldLIVE reported that Van Vuuren had resigned from the provincial legislature and retired from active politics on 30 April 2023 after notifying the DA several weeks ago about his intentions. Van Vuuren said that his children had encouraged him to resign because of a medical problem that affects his neck.

== Personal life ==
Van Vuuren's wfie, Charmaine, died in early 2017. He had two children with her.
