= 2019 Eastern Cape provincial election =

Provincial election

← 2014	8 May 2019	2024 →

All 63 seats to the Eastern Cape Provincial Legislature 32 seats needed for a majority

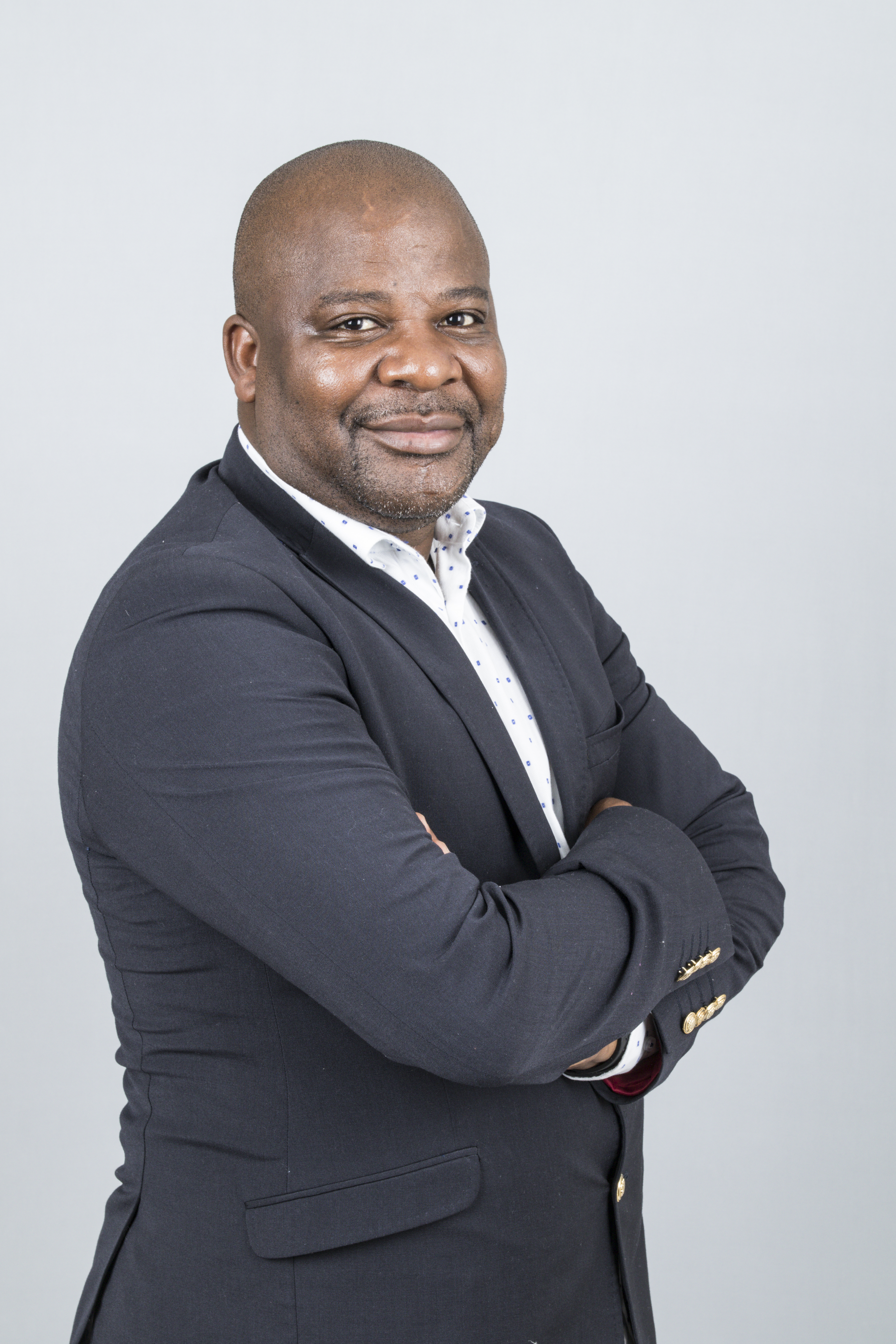

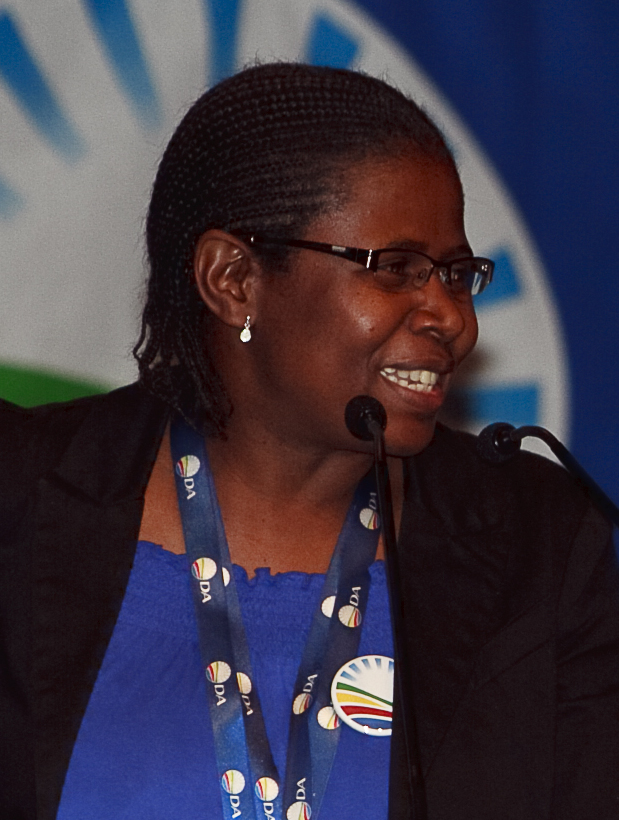

	First party	Second party	Third party
Candidate	Oscar Mabuyane	Nqaba Bhanga	Yazini Tetyana
Party	ANC	DA	EFF
Last election	70.09%	16.20%	3.48%
Seats before	45	10	2
Seats won	44	10	5
Seat change	▼1	0	▲3
Popular vote	1,357,137	310,538	154,821
Percentage	68.74%	15.73%	7.84%
Swing	▼1.35%	▼0.47%	▲4.36%
	Fourth party	Fifth party	Sixth party
Candidate	Mncedisi Filtane	Veliswa Mvenya	Piet Mey
Party	UDM	ATM	VF+
Last election	6.16%	New party	0.31%
Seats before	4	–	0
Seats won	2	1	1
Seat change	▼2	▲1	▲1
Popular vote	51,233	30,082	11,548
Percentage	2.60%	0.89%	0.58%
Swing	▼3.56%	▲1.52%	▲0.27%
Premier before election
Phumulo Masualle
African National Congress
Elected Premier
Oscar Mabuyane
African National Congress

The 2019 Eastern Cape provincial election was held on 8 May 2019, concurrently with the 2019 South African general election, to elect the 63 members of the Eastern Cape Provincial Legislature. The election was won by the African National Congress, the incumbent governing party in the province.

== Premier candidates ==
The African National Congress did not announce its premier candidate prior to the election. The incumbent premier Phumulo Masualle was 39th on the ANC's national list for the National Assembly election. Oscar Mabuyane, the party's incumbent provincial chairperson, was first on the provincial list for the provincial election. After the election, he announced as the party's premier candidate by the party's National Executive Committee.

In September 2018, the official opposition, the Democratic Alliance, announced its provincial leader, Nqaba Bhanga as the party's premier candidate for the provincial election.

The Economic Freedom Fighters did not announce a premier candidate since the party wants to abolish provinces, however, its provincial chairperson Yazini Tetyana was first on the party's list for the election.

The United Democratic Movement placed its national chairperson Mncedisi Filtane first on its candidate list.

Former DA provincial chairwoman Veliswa Mvenya was chosen as the African Transformation Movement's premier candidate.

On 5 March 2019, the Freedom Front Plus announced their provincial leader Piet Mey as their premier candidate.

Congress of the People Member of the Provincial Legislature, Rev. Lievie Sharpley was chosen as COPE's premier candidate.

== Results ==
Party	Votes	%	+/–	Seats	+/–
African National Congress	1,357,137	68.74	–1.35	44	–1
Democratic Alliance	310,538	15.73	–0.47	10	0
Economic Freedom Fighters	154,821	7.84	+4.36	5	+3
United Democratic Movement	51,233	2.60	–3.56	2	–2
African Transformation Movement	30,082	1.52	New	1	New
Freedom Front Plus	11,548	0.58	+0.27	1	+1
African Christian Democratic Party	9,249	0.47	+0.14	0	0
African Independent Congress	8,331	0.42	–0.35	0	–1
Pan Africanist Congress	8,009	0.41	–0.03	0	0
Alliance for Transformation for All	5,238	0.27	New	0	New
Congress of the People	4,971	0.25	–0.95	0	–1
Socialist Revolutionary Workers Party	4,807	0.24	New	0	New
Good	4,670	0.24	New	0	New
Al Jama-ah	3,007	0.15	New	0	New
African People's Convention	2,513	0.13	–0.10	0	0
Azanian People's Organisation	1,585	0.08	–0.04	0	0
Inkatha Freedom Party	1,028	0.05	–0.01	0	0
Christian Political Movement	1,016	0.05	New	0	New
Forum for Service Delivery	902	0.05	New	0	New
African Change Academy	634	0.03	New	0	New
National Freedom Party	593	0.03	–0.13	0	0
African Covenant	549	0.03	New	0	New
Plaaslike Besorgde Inwoners	534	0.03	New	0	New
International Revelation Congress	452	0.02	New	0	New
African Content Movement	374	0.02	New	0	New
People's Revolutionary Movement	360	0.02	New	0	New
Total	1,974,181	100.00	–	63	0
Valid votes	1,974,181	98.65			
Invalid/blank votes	27,081	1.35			
Total votes	2,001,262	100.00			
Registered voters/turnout	3,363,161	59.51			
Source: Election Resources

== Aftermath ==
On 22 May 2019, members of the Eastern Cape Provincial Legislature were sworn in during the first sitting of the provincial legislature after the election and Oscar Masbuyane was elected as the provincial premier, while Helen Sauls-August was elected speaker with Mlibo Qoboshiyane as deputy speaker.
