= Vicky Knoetze =

South African politician

Vicky Knoetze MPL

Member of the Eastern Cape Provincial Legislature
- Incumbent
- Assumed office 21 May 2014

Personal details
- Party: Democratic Alliance
- Occupation: Member of the Provincial Legislature
- Profession: Politician

Vicky Knoetze is a South African politician serving as a Member of the Eastern Cape Provincial Legislature for the Democratic Alliance. She was elected to the provincial legislature in May 2014.

== Political career ==
Knoetze is a long-standing member of the Democratic Alliance. She was a councillor of the Nelson Mandela Bay Metropolitan Municipality before her election to the Eastern Cape Provincial Legislature in 2014. She took office as an MPL on 21 May 2014.

Knoetze has been a member of the provincial executive committee of the DA since 2017. She is the chairperson of the party's provincial disciplinary committee and a member of the party's federal legal commission. In 2020, Knoetze announced her candidacy for deputy provincial chairperson of the party. She was elected at the party's first ever virtual provincial congress held on 29 August.

She was elected deputy provincial leader of the DA alongside DA NCOP Member Mlindi Nhanha at the party's provincial conference held in Graaff-Reinet in February 2023.
