= Nqaba Bhanga =

South African politician (born 1977)

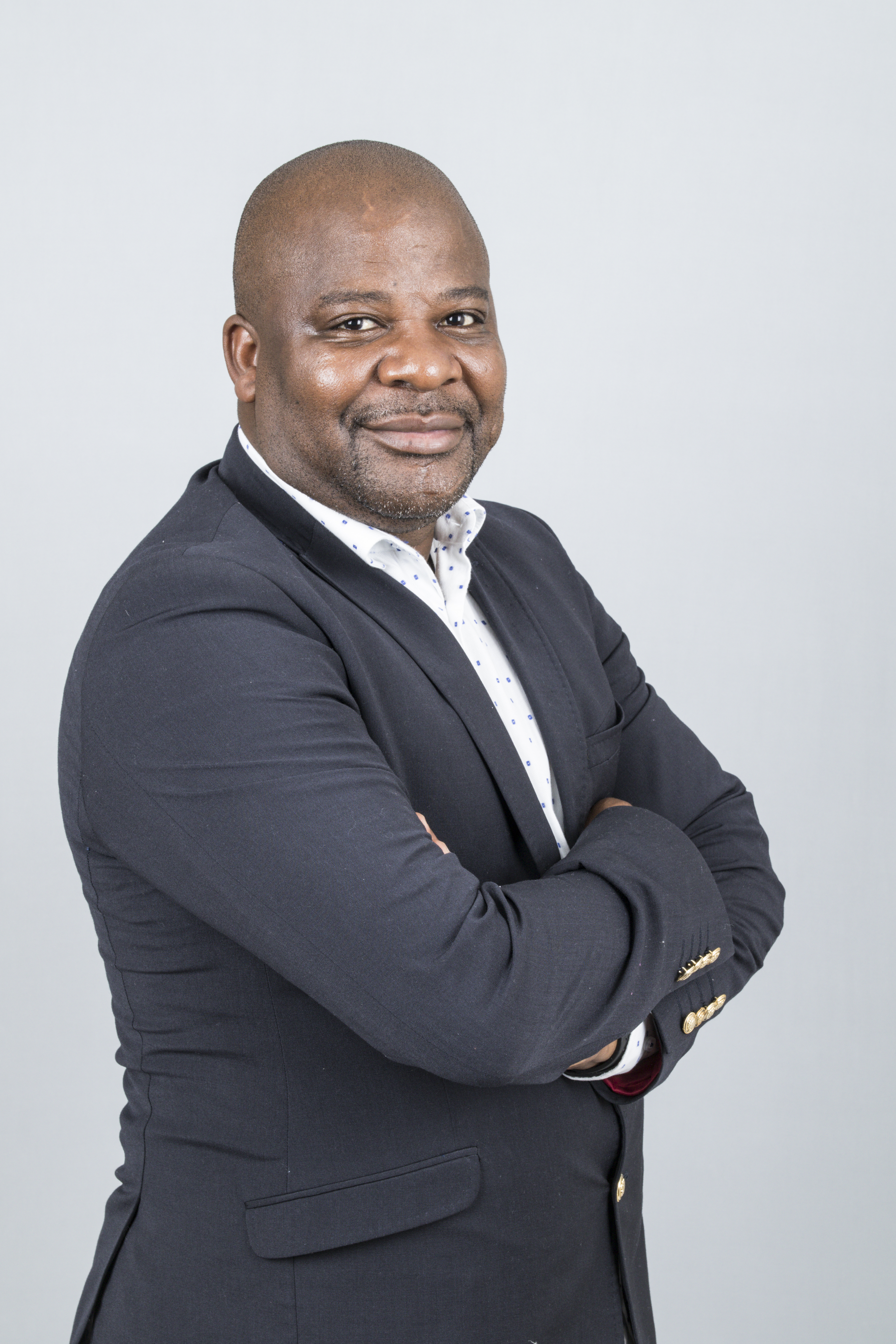

Leader of the Opposition in the Eastern Cape Provincial Legislature
- In office 9 December 2021 – 1 December 2023
- Premier: Oscar Mabuyane
- Preceded by: Bobby Stevenson
- In office 22 May 2019 – 4 March 2020
- Preceded by: Bobby Stevenson
- Succeeded by: Bobby Stevenson

Member of the Eastern Cape Provincial Legislature
- In office 9 December 2021 – 1 December 2023
- In office 22 May 2019 – 4 March 2020

Mayor of Nelson Mandela Bay
- In office 4 December 2020 – 22 November 2021
- Preceded by: Tshonono Buyeye (acting); Mongameli Bobani
- Succeeded by: Eugene Johnson

Eastern Cape Provincial Leader of the Democratic Alliance
- In office 6 May 2017 – 25 February 2023
- Preceded by: Athol Trollip
- Succeeded by: Andrew Whitfield

Member of the National Assembly of South Africa
- In office 1 December 2011 – 6 August 2016

Personal details
- Born: Bennet Mzwenqaba Bhanga; 28 August 1977 (age 49) Port Elizabeth, South Africa
- Party: African National Congress (up to 2010); COPE (2011–2014); Democratic Alliance (2014–2023)

Bennet Mzwenqaba Bhanga (born 28 August 1977), known as Nqaba Bhanga, is a South African politician. He is the former Leader of the Official Opposition in the Eastern Cape Provincial Legislature, the former Provincial Leader of the Democratic Alliance (DA) in the Eastern Cape, a former Mayor of Nelson Mandela Bay, a former Member of the Mayoral Committee (MMC) for Human Settlements in the Nelson Mandela Bay Metropolitan Municipality, a former member of Parliament, and the DA's former Shadow Minister of Co-operative Governance and Traditional Affairs (COGTA).

== Biography ==
He was born in KwaZakhele, Port Elizabeth on 28 August 1977. While attending the KwaZakhele High School, he got involved in student politics for the first time. He was later elected the regional chair of the Congress of South African Students (Cosas).

Bhanga joined the African National Congress and became the party's Nelson Mandela Bay Youth Leader, and SRC President of the Port Elizabeth Technikon where he obtained his first qualification in Public Administration. He later on achieved a postgraduate qualification in Maritime Studies. Bhanga served as the national secretary general of the South African Student Congress (SASCO), and also as the youth leader of the Congress of the People (COPE) and its member of Parliament from 2011 to 2014, prior to him defecting to the DA. He served as an MP for the DA from 2014 to 2016. He was the party's Ngqura constituency leader.

In 2016, he was elected as a councillor and was appointed the Mayoral Committee Member (MMC) for Human Settlements of the Nelson Mandela Bay Municipality under mayor Athol Trollip, whom he succeeded as Party Provincial Leader in 2017.

Bhanga was the DA's candidate for Eastern Cape Premier in the 2019 general elections. Following the elections, he became a Member of the Eastern Cape Provincial Legislature and consequently assumed the title of Leader of the Opposition.

On 4 March 2020, Bhanga resigned from the Eastern Cape Provincial Legislature. The DA had nominated him as their mayoral candidate for Nelson Mandela Bay. He was elected unopposed as mayor on 4 December 2020. On 23 August 2021, DA leader John Steenhuisen announced that Bhanga would be the DA's mayoral candidate for Nelson Mandela Bay in the 2021 local government elections. The DA did not win a majority on the Nelson Mandela Bay city council and lost nine seats. The ANC's Eugene Johnson was elected as mayor at the inaugural council meeting. She received 60 out of 119 votes, while Bhanga received only 59 votes.

The DA's Federal Executive (FedEx) approved Bhanga's return to the provincial legislature on 29 November 2021 and he resigned as a councillor on 2 December 2021. On 9 December, Bhanga was sworn in as a member of the provincial legislature and became leader of the opposition again.

In January 2023, Bhanga announced that he would not be seeking re-election to a third term as the provincial leader of the DA at the party's provincial conference in February. Bhanga said that his decision was influenced from the trauma he had suffered from after having been involved in a fatal car accident in August 2021 which left two people dead. Provincial chairman Andrew Whitfield succeeded him as provincial leader.

In June 2023, Bhanga was suspended from party activities after he accused the party's federal council chairperson Helen Zille of being a racist. He resigned from the DA and as a member of the provincial legislature on 1 December 2023, hours after his party membership was terminated.
