= Eastern Cape Provincial Legislature =

South African legislature

Eastern Cape Provincial Legislature Oos-Kaapse Provinsiale Wetgewer (Afrikaans) Indlu yoWiso-mthetho yePhondo leMpuma-Kapa (Xhosa)
- 7th Legislature

Type
- Type: Unicameral

Leadership
- Speaker: Helen Sauls-August, ANC since 22 May 2019
- Deputy Speaker: Vuyo Jali, ANC since 14 June 2024
- Premier: Oscar Mabuyane, ANC since 22 May 2019
- Leader of the Opposition: Vicky Knoetze, DA since 14 June 2024

Structure
- Seats: 72
- Political groups: Government (45): ANC (45); Official Opposition (11): DA (11); Other parties (16): EFF (8); UDM (3); PA (2); MK (1); ATM (1); FF+ (1)

Elections
- Voting system: Party-list proportional representation
- Last election: 29 May 2024

Meeting place
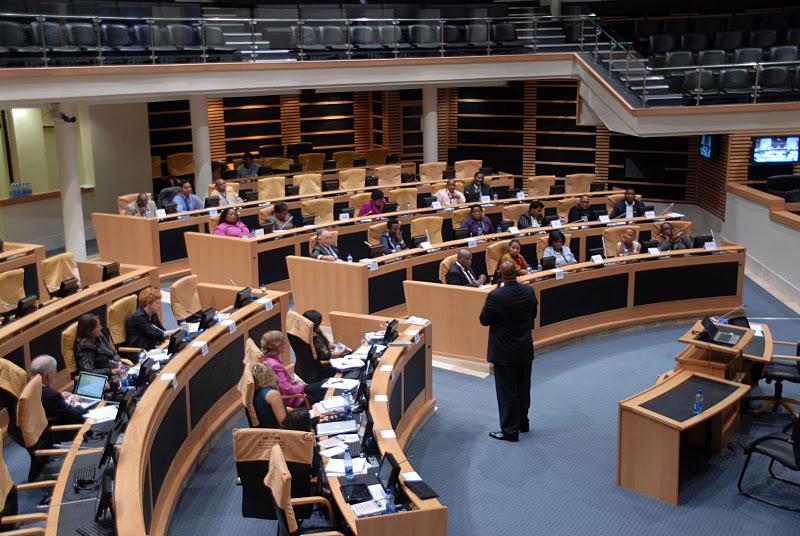
- Provincial Legislature Building, Independence Avenue, Bhisho

Website
- Official website

The Eastern Cape Provincial Legislature is the primary legislative body of the South African province of Eastern Cape. It is unicameral in its composition, and elects the premier and the provincial cabinet from among the members of the leading party or coalition in the parliament.

At the commencement of the 7th provincial legislature on 14 June 2024, the number of seats allocated to the Eastern Cape Provincial Legislature increased from 63 to 72.

== Powers ==
The Eastern Cape Provincial Legislature elects the Premier of the Eastern Cape and can force the Premier to resign by passing a motion of no confidence. Even though the Executive Council of the province is appointed by the Premier, the legislature can pass a motion of no confidence forcing the Premier to reconfigure the council. The provincial legislature also designates that Eastern Cape's delegates to the National Council of Provinces, assigning delegates to parties in proportion to the total number of seats each party holds in the legislature.

The legislature has the power to pass legislation in numerous fields set forth in the national constitution; in some fields, the legislative power is shared with the national parliament, while in others it is reserved to the province. The fields include matters such as health, education, agriculture, housing, environmental protection, and development planning.

The legislature supervises the administration of the Eastern Cape provincial government, and the Premier of the Eastern Cape and the members of the Executive Council are required to report to the legislature on the performance of their individual responsibilities. The legislature also manages the pecuniary matters of the provincial government by way of the appropriation bills which determine the provincial budget.

== Election ==
The provincial legislature consists of 72 members, who are elected through a system of party list proportional representation with closed lists. In other words, each voter casts a vote for one political party, and seats in the legislature are allocated to the parties in proportion to the number of votes received. The seats are then filled by members in accordance with lists submitted by the parties before the election.

The legislature is elected for a term of five years unless it is dissolved early. This may occur if the legislature votes to dissolve and it is at least three years since the last election, or if the Premiership falls vacant and the legislature fails to elect a new Premier within ninety days. By convention, all nine provincial legislatures and the National Assembly are elected on the same day.

The most recent election was held on 29 May 2024. The following table summarises the results.

Party	Votes	Vote %	Seats
ANC	1,114,294	62.16	45
DA	267,007	14.89	11
EFF	181,855	10.14	8
UDM	66,572	3.71	3
PA	41,355	2.31	2
ATM	27,761	1.55	1
MK	25,904	1.44	1
VF+	9,321	0.52	1
Other parties	57,524	3.28	0
Total	1,791,593	100.0	72

The following table shows the composition of the provincial parliament after past elections.

Event	AIC	ANC	ATM	COPE	DP/DA	EFF	FF/FF+	MK	NP/NNP	PA	PAC	UDM
1994 election	—	48	—	—	1	—	0	—	6	—	1	—
1999 election	—	47	—	—	4	—	0	—	2	—	1	9
2004 election	—	51	—	—	5	—	0	—	0	—	1	6
2009 election	1	44	—	9	6	—	0	—	—	—	0	3
2014 election	1	45	—	1	10	2	0	—	—	—	0	4
2019 election	0	44	1	0	10	5	1	—	—	—	0	2
2024 election	0	45	1	0	11	8	1	1	—	2	0	3

== Officers ==
The Speaker is the political head of the legislature and is assisted by a Deputy Speaker. The current Speaker is Helen Sauls-August and the Deputy Speaker is Mlibo Qoboshiyane; they are both members of the African National Congress (ANC). The following people have served as Speaker:

Name	Term start	Term end	Party
Gugile Nkwinti	1994	1999	ANC
Mkhangeli Matomela	1999	2004	ANC
Noxolo Kiviet	2004	2009	ANC
Fikile Xasa	2009	2014	ANC
Noxolo Kiviet	2014	2019	ANC
Helen Sauls-August	2019	Incumbent	ANC
