= Political parties that contested the 2019 South African general election =

Parties that contested the 2019 South African general election

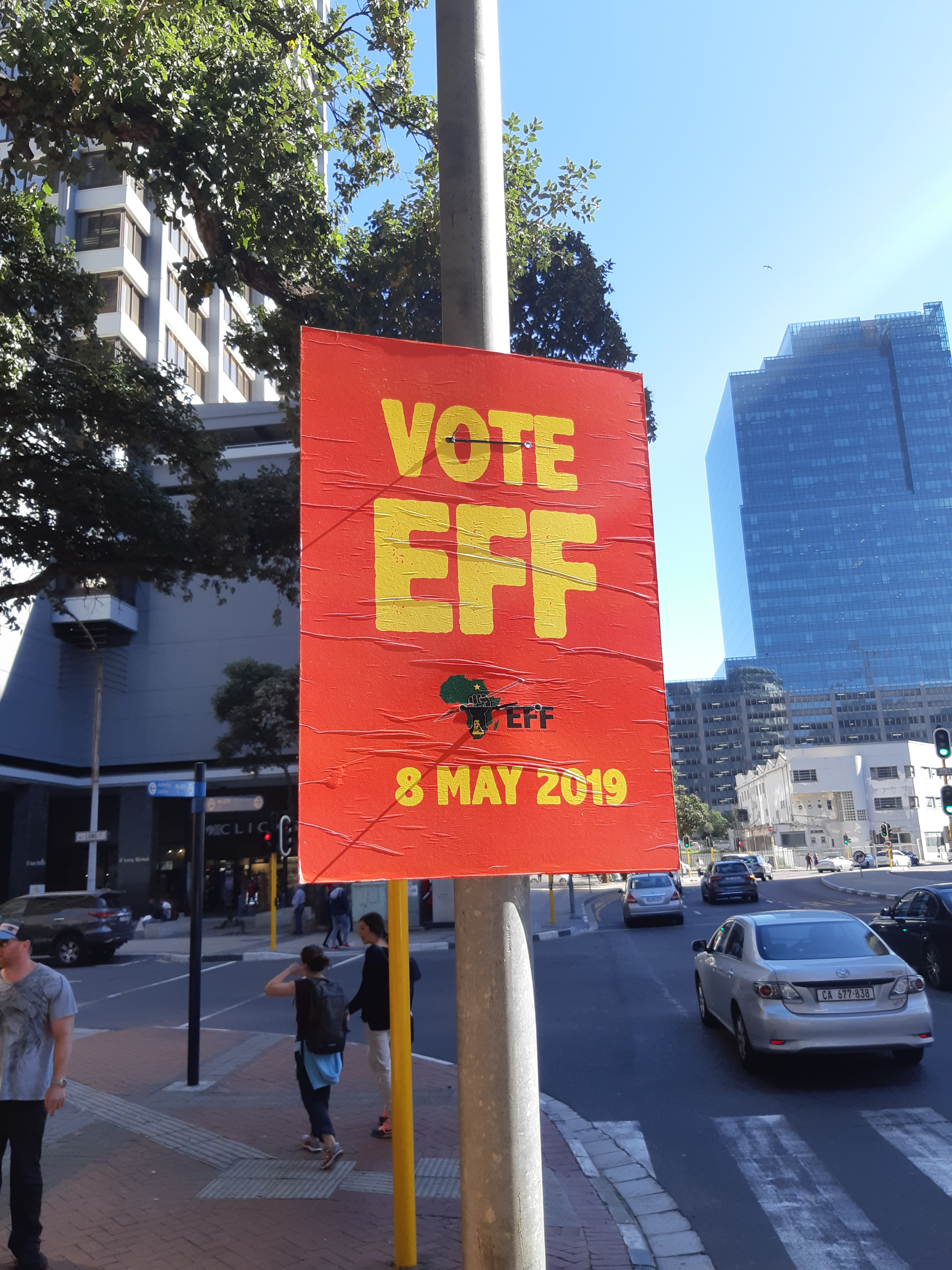
An EFF election poster in Cape Town.

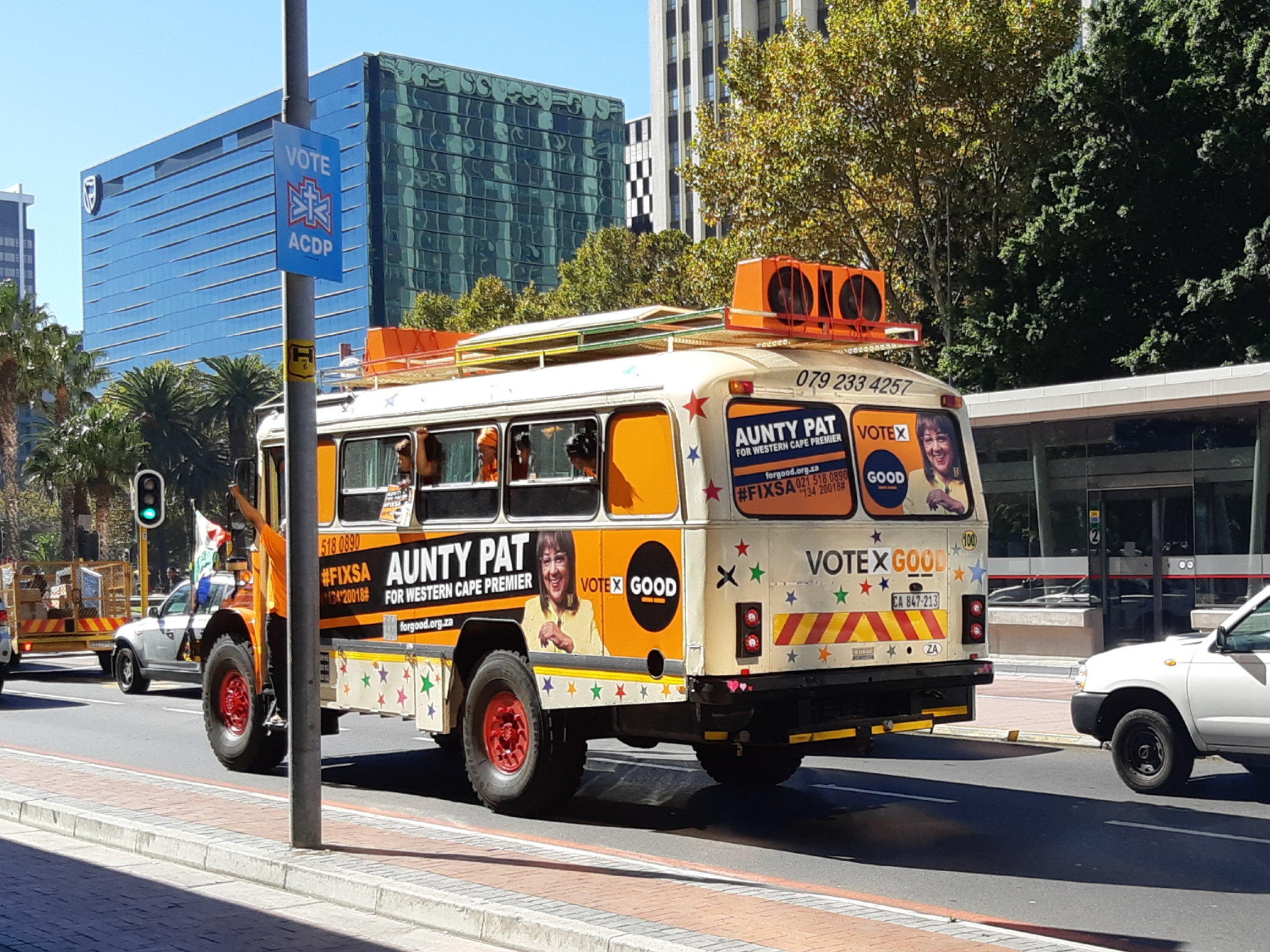
A GOOD party campaign bus in Cape Town. An African Christian Democratic Party election poster can be seen on the lamp post in front of the bus.

The Electoral Commission of South Africa (IEC) announced on 20 March 2019 that a record number of 48 parties had registered candidates for the national parliamentary election. This is 19 more parties that contested the 2014 national elections. In the provincial legislature elections, the total number of parties registering candidates were:

- Eastern Cape – 26
- Free State – 28
- Gauteng – 36
- KwaZulu-Natal – 31
- Limpopo – 34
- Mpumalanga – 28
- Northern Cape – 21
- North West – 29
- Western Cape – 34

The electoral code of conduct was signed at the Gallagher Convention Centre in Midrand, Gauteng on 20 March 2019. At the signing event, a draw was held in which the African Security Congress won the right to appear at the top of the ballot paper.

== National ==
The following list of parties intending to contest the national ballot were presented by the IEC on the 20 March 2019 in the order that they would appear on the ballot:

- African Security Congress
- Afrikan Alliance of Social Democrats
- African Christian Democratic Party
- African Congress of Democrats
- African Content Movement
- African Covenant
- African Democratic Change
- African Independent Congress
- African National Congress
- African Renaissance Unity Party
- African Transformation Movement
- Agang South Africa
- Al Jama-ah
- Alliance for Transformation for All
- Azanian People's Organisation
- African People's Convention
- Better Residents Association
- Black First Land First
- Capitalist Party of South Africa
- Christian Political Movement
- Compatriots of South Africa
- Congress of the People
- Democratic Alliance
- Democratic Liberal Congress
- Economic Emancipation Forum
- Economic Freedom Fighters
- Forum for Service Delivery
- Free Democrats
- Front National
- GOOD
- Independent Civic Organisation of South Africa
- Inkatha Freedom Party
- International Revelation Congress
- Land Party
- Minority Front
- National Freedom Party
- National People’s Ambassadors
- National People's Front
- Pan Africanist Congress of Azania
- Patriotic Alliance
- People’s Revolutionary Movement
- Power of Africans Unity
- Socialist Revolutionary Workers Party
- South African Maintenance and Estate Beneficiaries Association
- South African National Congress of Traditional Authorities
- United Democratic Movement
- Freedom Front Plus
- Women Forward

=== African National Congress ===
The governing African National Congress (ANC) has held a majority of the seats in the National Assembly since 1994, being re-elected with increasing majorities in 1999 and 2004, and with a slight fall in its majority in 2009 and 2014. The ANC is led by Cyril Ramaphosa, who was elected to a five-year term as President of the African National Congress, beating his rival, Nkosazana Dlamini-Zuma, by a narrow margin. David Mabuza was elected as Deputy President of the ANC, succeeding Ramaphosa.

National Assembly Speaker Baleka Mbete, former Mpumalanga Premier Mathews Phosa, ANC Treasurer General Zweli Mkhize, and Human Settlements Ministers Lindiwe Sisulu were all candidates for the position of ANC President, but later all withdrew.

On 14 February 2018, Zuma resigned as President of South Africa, leading Ramaphosa, as Deputy President, to succeed him as acting president and serve out the remainder of Zuma's term. Ramaphosa was elected president on 15 February 2018. Ramaphosa thus ran for a full term in office as president.

The party lost many municipalities and support in the 2016 municipal elections, including the mayoralty and majority in councils such as Nelson Mandela Bay, Tshwane and Johannesburg. The party had to form coalitions to retain control of the City of Ekurhuleni and many other municipalities. They have gained back control in many municipalities through motions of no-confidence. Although the party ousted the Democratic Alliance Mayor, Athol Trollip, in Nelson Mandela Bay, the current mayor of the municipality is from the United Democratic Movement.

When David Mabuza resigned as Premier of Mpumalanga to become Deputy President of South Africa, MEC for Cooperative Governance and Traditional Affairs Refilwe Mtsweni-Tsipane was appointed to fill his position. She was officially inaugurated on 20 March 2018. Free State Premier Ace Magashule was elected Secretary-General of the party at its 54th Elective Conference in December 2018. He stepped down in March 2018 and was succeeded by MEC for Human Settlements Sisi Ntombela.

In April 2018, violent protests started in the North West calling for Supra Mahumapelo's resignation. He resigned in May 2018 and professor Job Mokgoro was designated by the party to succeed him.

The party launched its manifesto on 12 January 2019, alongside its 107th birthday celebrations at the Moses Mabhida Stadium in Durban.

The African National Congress released its national and provincial candidate lists on 15 March 2019. The party was denounced for the inclusion of various controversial cabinet ministers and embattled party politicians, such as Nomvula Mokonyane, Bathabile Dlamini, Malusi Gigaba, Supra Mahumapelo and Mosebenzi Zwane. Despite the criticism, senior party leaders have defended these candidates. Notable people who were excluded from the lists include Nathi Nhleko and Des van Rooyen.

=== Democratic Alliance ===
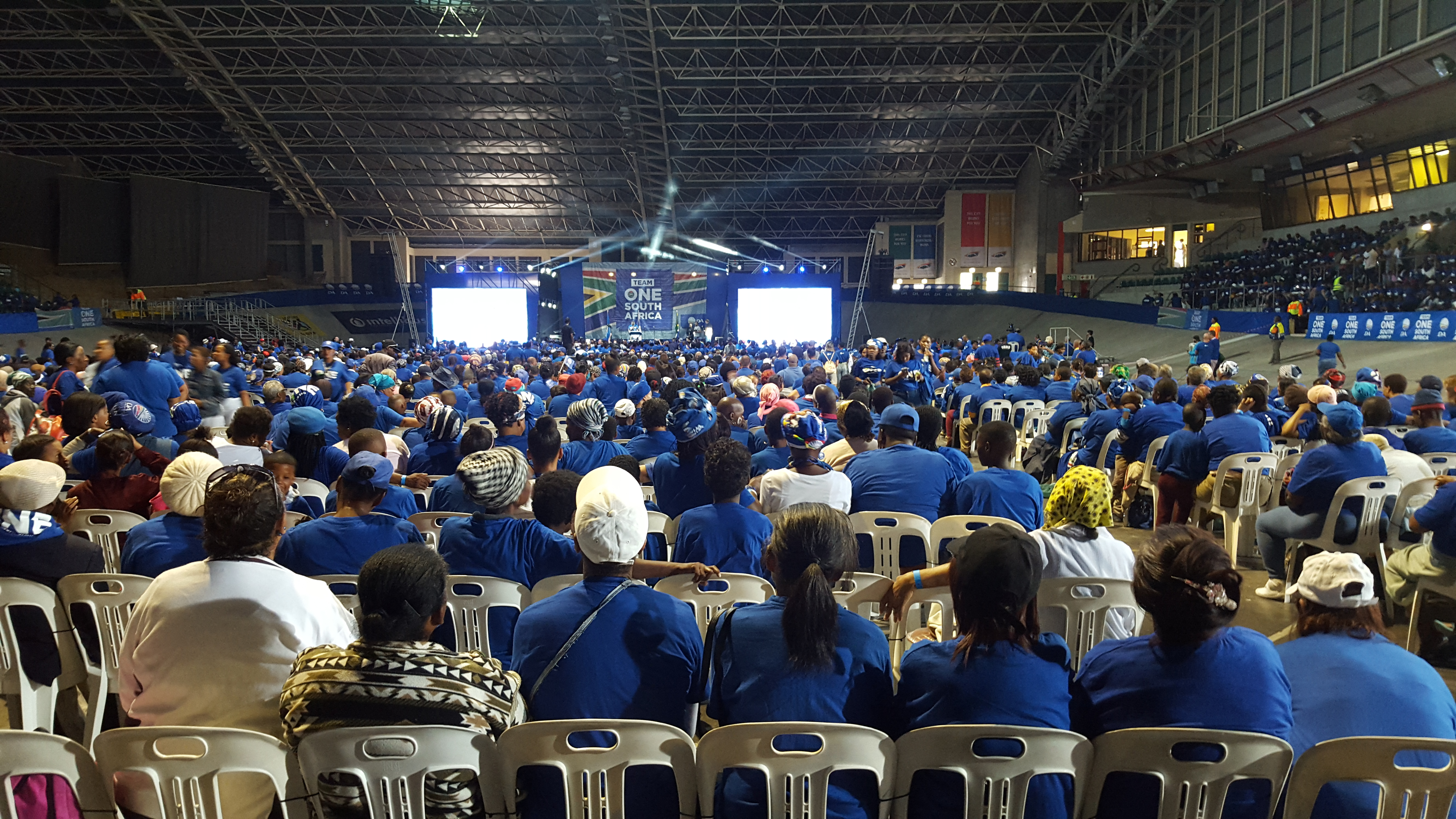
Thousands of party supporters at the party's Western Cape Provincial Manifesto launch.

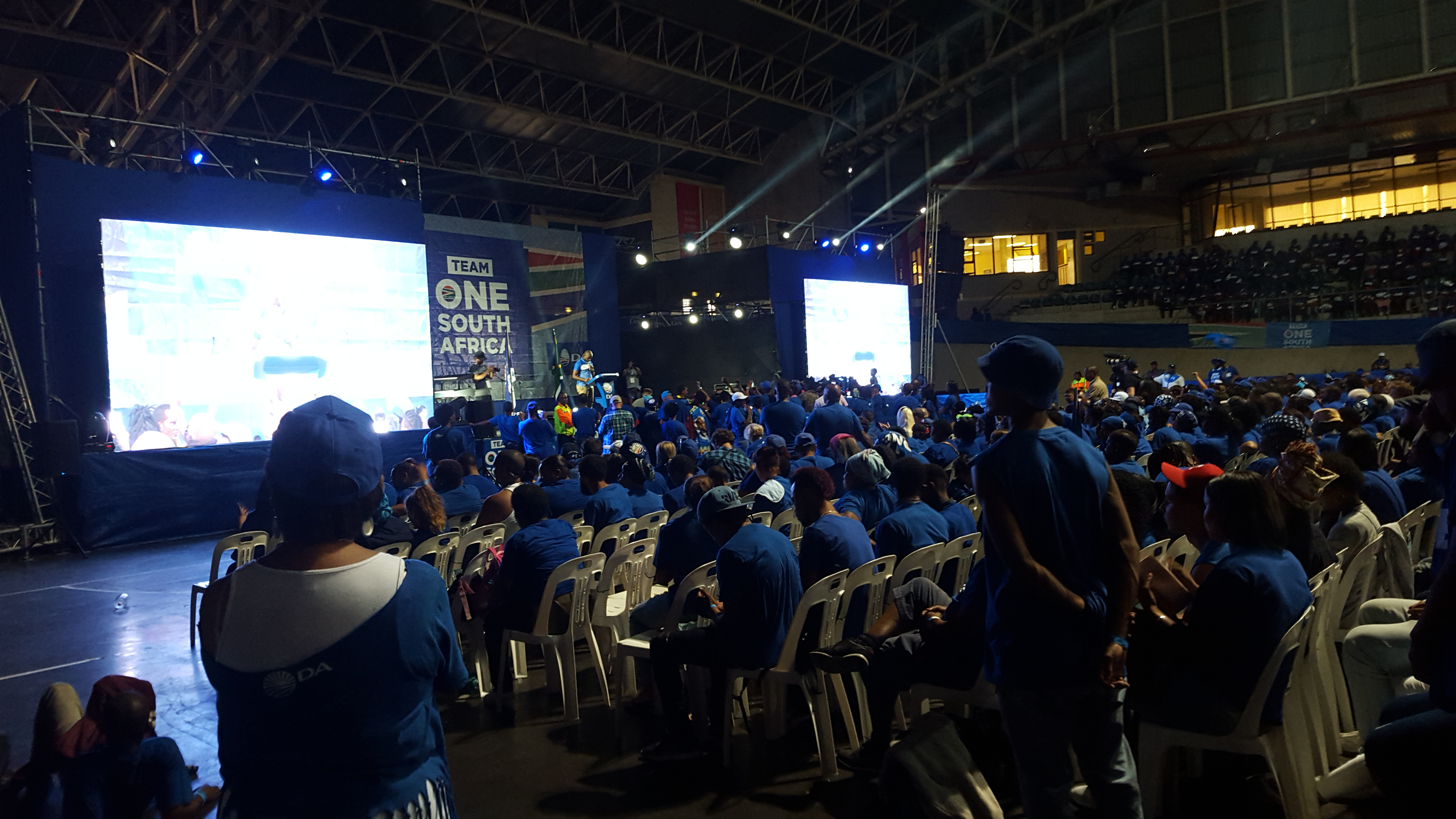
Mmusi Maimane addressing supporters at the party's Western Cape Provincial Manifesto launch.

The official opposition Democratic Alliance (DA) was led by Helen Zille. She announced on 12 April 2015, that she was not running for re-election. Leader of the Opposition Mmusi Maimane and Federal Chairperson Wilmot James were seen as prominent front-runners.

At the party's 2015 Federal Congress in Port Elizabeth, Maimane was elected leader of the DA, succeeding outgoing leader Helen Zille. He defeated Wilmot James, winning close to 90% of the vote. He was backed by prominent businessman and future Johannesburg mayor Herman Mashaba. He became the first black South African to lead the DA, as well as its youngest leader to date.

In the 2016 municipal elections, the party contested the municipal elections for the first time under the leadership of Mmusi Maimane. The party gained significant support and control of municipalities all across South Africa while assuming control of most Western Cape councils. In addition, the party gained three metropolitan municipalities from the ANC – Tshwane, Johannesburg and Nelson Mandela Bay. The party did increase its majority in Cape Town. They lost control of the Nelson Mandela Bay municipality in August 2018, after a vote of no confidence ousted the DA administration.

The DA held its Federal Congress on 7–8 April 2018 in Pretoria. Mmusi Maimane was re-elected, unopposed as the leader for another term.

The party has also had its fair share of controversies. In October 2015, DA Shadow Minister Dianne Kohler Barnard made a controversial statement praising apartheid President PW Botha. She faced internal DA disciplinary action, later apologised, and was removed as Shadow Minister. She returned as Shadow Deputy Minister of Police in September 2017. Helen Zille sent out controversial tweets in March 2017, arguing that some elements of South Africa's colonial legacy made a positive contribution to the country. Zille subsequently apologised in light of the outrage generated and remained Western Cape Premier.

After months of infighting and legal challenges, Mayor of Cape Town, Patricia de Lille, announced at a press briefing with Mmusi Maimane that she would resign as Mayor of Cape Town, effective 31 October 2018. Candidates for her position included DA Leader Mmusi Maimane, former Cape Town Mayor Dan Plato, Gauteng Provincial Legislature Member Heinrich Volmink, Deputy Mayor of Cape Town Ian Neilson, and Western Cape Provincial Parliament Speaker Sharna Fernandez. Dan Plato was subsequently selected. Patricia de Lille has since formed a new political party in December 2018 named Good.

On 24 September 2018, the party launched its "One South Africa for All" campaign at the Mary Fitzgerald Square in Johannesburg.

The party's candidates for the position of premier of the different provinces were as follows:

- Eastern Cape – Nqaba Bhanga
- Free State – Patricia Kopane
- Gauteng – Solly Msimanga
- KwaZulu-Natal – Zwakele Mncwango
- Limpopo – Jacques Smalle
- Mpumalanga – Jane Sithole
- North West – Joe McGluwa
- Northern Cape – Andrew Louw
- Western Cape – Alan Winde

In January 2019, the Democratic Alliance erected a controversial billboard with the words "The ANC is killing us" in the Johannesburg CBD. The billboard aimed to honour all the South Africans who have lost their lives, because of crime, the Life Healthcare Esidimeni Scandal, Marikana killings, and children who have fallen into pit toilets. The billboard was subsequently destroyed by African National Congress supporters.

In mid-January 2019, Tshwane mayor Solly Msimanga announced his intention to resign as mayor in order to focus on his Gauteng premiership campaign. The party nominated Stevens Mokgalapa to succeed him. He was elected on 12 February 2019.

On 23 February 2019, the party launched its manifesto at the Rand Stadium in Rosettenville, Johannesburg.

On 16 March 2019, Democratic Alliance Federal Council Chairperson James Selfe released the party's parliament and provincial legislatures candidate lists. Selfe made the announcement alongside some of the candidates on the party's lists. The party's national list included senior party figures, such as Federal Leader Mmusi Maimane, James Selfe, Natasha Mazzone, John Steenhuisen, Glynnis Breytenbach, Gwen Ngwenya and David Maynier. Newly elected mayor of Tshwane Stevens Mokgalapa was also mentioned on the list. Selfe said that Mokgalapa applied to be a candidate for the National Assembly long before he was elected mayor.

=== Economic Freedom Fighters ===
The Economic Freedom Fighters (EFF) is a splinter party of the ANC that was formed in July 2013 by expelled ANC Youth League leader, Julius Malema, taking a strong anti-ANC position within its far-left economic platform, such as calling for the expropriation of land without compensation, and the nationalisation of South Africa's mines and the South African Reserve Bank.

The party contested its first general elections in 2014 and garnered support across South Africa, giving it a total of 25 seats in the National Assembly.

In the 2016 municipal elections, the party's support further increased, growing from 6% to 8% in the national popular vote. The party voted with the DA, and many other smaller opposition parties, to install DA-led local governments and oust ANC-led administrations.

On 2 February 2019, the party launched its manifesto in Soshanguve.

=== Other parties ===
The following parties have contested previous elections:

- The Inkatha Freedom Party (IFP) was led by Mangosuthu Buthelezi. The party's support had decreased since 2004 due to internal party disputes. The party gained municipalities and support in its stronghold of KwaZulu-Natal in the 2016 municipal elections. This election was Buthelezi's last election as party president, as he announced on 20 January 2019 that he would not seek re-election to another term. The party launched its manifesto on 10 March 2019. The party elected Velenkosini Hlabisa as his successor in August 2019.
- The National Freedom Party (NFP) was formed in 2011 by disgruntled IFP members. The party made gains on the IFP in 2014 but lost support in 2016. The party launched its manifesto on 31 March 2019.
- The United Democratic Movement (UDM) is led by Bantu Holomisa. The party's support had greatly diminished since the 1999 election. In August 2018, the DA Mayor, Athol Trollip, was ousted from office in Nelson Mandela Bay through a vote of no confidence. The ANC voted with the UDM and smaller parties to install Mongameli Bobani as the first mayor of Nelson Mandela Bay from the UDM. The party launched its manifesto on 16 February 2019.
- The Freedom Front Plus (FF+; Afrikaans: Vryheidsfront Plus, VF+) is a conservative, separatist party formed in 1994, led by Pieter Groenewald. Since 1994, the party's support has declined but has maintained a small presence in parliament by securing no more than four seats in the National Assembly since the 2004 general election. According to the party's manifesto: "The Freedom Front Plus is irrevocably committed to the realisation of communities', in particular, the Afrikaner's, internationally recognised right to self-determination, territorial or otherwise; the maintenance, protection and promotion of their rights and interests, as well as the promotion of the right of self-determination of any other community, bound by a common language and cultural heritage in South Africa." The party launched its manifesto on 2 March 2019.
- The Congress of the People (COPE), a splinter party of the ANC, is led by former ANC Free State Premier and Minister of Defence, Mosiuoa Lekota. The party's support was greatly diminished in 2014, resulting in the party losing all but three of its seats in parliament and in the nine provincial legislatures. The party formed multiple coalition governments with the DA in the aftermath of the 2016 municipal elections. According to the party's manifesto: "Our vision for South Africa is for a democratic, inclusive and a prosperous country that promotes racial harmony, social cohesion, solidarity, unity in diversity, freedom and gender equality. COPE envisages a caring society where a shared national identity and pride are deeply rooted amongst South Africans." The party launched its manifesto on 9 March 2019.
- The African Christian Democratic Party (ACDP) is led by Kenneth Meshoe. The party's support had been decreasing since the 2009 general election. After the 2014 general elections, the party became the ninth-largest party in the National Assembly after it won three seats. The party did manage to retain its sole seat in the Western Cape Provincial Parliament. The party's support decreased further in the 2016 municipal elections. The party launched its manifesto on 16 February 2019.
- The African Independent Congress (AIC), which support comes mainly from the Eastern Cape. The party is led by Mandla Galo. In the 2016 municipal elections, the party won a total of fifty-five council seats across South Africa.
- Agang South Africa was led by Mamphela Ramphele until she retired from politics after the 2014 general election. The party launched its manifesto on 23 March 2019.
- Pan Africanist Congress of Azania (PAC) held only one seat in the 26th Parliament. The party is led by Mzwanele Nyhontso, who was elected leader in December 2018. The party launched its manifesto on 23 February 2019.
- African People's Convention (APC) was founded by Themba Godi via floor-crossing legislation on 4 September 2007. The party also held only one seat in the 26th Parliament. The party launched its manifesto on 23 February 2019.
- Front National (FN) is a party formed in late 2013. The party is not represented in the National Assembly. The party promotes secession and Afrikaner self-determination. FN strikes no distinction between English-speaking Whites and Afrikaners in South Africa.
- Al Jama-ah is an Islamic party led by Ganief Hendricks. The party won 9 seats at the local government level in the most recent municipal elections in 2016.
- Better Residents Association (formerly known as the Bushbuckridge Residents Association) was formed in 2011 by disgruntled ANC members in the Bushbuckridge Local Municipality aiming the improve the quality of service delivery. The party is currently led by Delta Mokoena.
- Women Forward (WF) was established in 2007 by Nana Ngobese-Nxumalo, granddaughter of Chief Albert Luthuli. The party had said that its strongest support is in the province of Limpopo. It last contested the 2009 general elections.
- The Azanian People's Organisation (AZAPO) was established in 1978. The party is currently led by Strike Thokoane. The party's former president Mosibudi Mangena was appointed as Minister of Science and Technology in 2004. The party lost its sole parliamentary seat in the 2014 elections.
- The Independent Civic Organisation of South Africa (ICOSA) is a minor Western Cape-based political party that was formed in 2006 by controversial former Karoo District Municipality manager Truman Prince. The party launched its manifesto on 2 February 2019.
- The Patriotic Alliance (PA) was formed in November 2013 by Gayton McKenzie and Kenny Kunene. Kunene quit the party after the 2014 elections. The party received just over 13,000 votes nationally in the 2014 general election.
- The South African Maintenance and Estate Beneficiaries Association (SAMEBA) is led by Makgorometse Gift Makhaba. The party contested the 2014 general elections. Most recently, the party contested a by-election in the Fetakgomo Local Municipality in Limpopo. The party's candidate received only 85 votes (0.85%).

=== New parties ===
Several new parties would contest the election both nationally and provincially:

- Black First Land First (BLF) is a controversial far-left black nationalist political party. The party is headed by its founder and expelled EFF member, Andile Mngxitama. Mngxitama was expelled from the EFF in April 2015 and subsequently lost his National Assembly membership. He founded the party in October 2015, along with other disgruntled EFF members. The party's leaders and its members have been criticized and condemned for making racially insensitive comments that call for the killing of white South Africans. The party launched its manifesto on 6 April 2019. Following the election, the party was deregistered.
- Disgruntled former ANC Member of Parliament, Makhosi Khoza, founded the political party African Democratic Change (ADeC) in December 2017. She announced in April 2018 that she was retiring from politics. Khoza subsequently joined the Organisation Undoing Tax Abuse (OUTA) as Executive Director of the Local Government Strategy division. She later resigned from OUTA in March 2019.
- Patricia de Lille, former mayor of Cape Town and DA member, formed the political party Good in December 2018. The party is registered with the Electoral Commission of South Africa and was set to contest the 2019 elections, both nationally and provincially. The party launched its manifesto on 5 February 2019.
- On 13 December 2018, former SABC Chief Operating Officer Hlaudi Motsoeneng joined the country's political landscape and launched a new political group named the African Content Movement (ACM) that contested both the national and provincial elections. The party launched its manifesto on 6 April 2019.
- The African Transformation Movement (ATM) is a political party that was formed in October 2018. It is led by Vuyolwethu Zungula. Former Eastern Cape Democratic Alliance Provincial Chairperson Veliswa Mvenya is the Eastern Cape Provincial Chairperson of the party. The party is planning if elected to power, to bring back the death penalty and scrap low pass marks in public schools.
- The Capitalist Party of South Africa (ZACP) is a political party that was launched on the 17 March 2018. It was founded by ten people who describe themselves as "positive disruptors" and who believe that innovative thinking could find solutions to many of South Africa's problems. The party was founded by ten founders: Kanthan Pillay, Roman Cabanac, Neo Kuaho, Gideon Joubert, Unathi Kwaza, Duncan McLeod, Sindile Vabaza, Louis Nel, Katlego Mabusela and Dumo Denga. The new political party has a purple cow as its logo.
- The Socialist Revolutionary Workers Party (SRWP) was founded in March 2019. The party has its roots in the NUMSA trade union.
- The African Security Congress (ASC) was founded in 2017 by security guards lobbying for greater rights for the members of the private security industry. Party President Teboho Motloung has previously called for security guards to be directly employed by the national government and that security guards must co-operate with the South African Police Service.
- The African Renaissance Unity Party (ARU) was founded in 2018 by the King of the amaHlubi nation in the KwaZulu-Natal province, Bryce Mthimkhulu. The party's leaders are all traditional chiefs.
- The African Covenant (ACO) was founded in March 2018 by Convy Baloyi. The party campaigned on conservative religious principles. The party also campaigned for the return of the death penalty.
- The Afrikan Alliance of Social Democrats (AASD) is led by former ANC Mangaung Mayor, Pappie Mokoena. He was acquitted of theft and money-laundering charges in 2012.
- The Alliance for Transformation for All (ATA) was launched in 2018 by taxi associations and focuses on reforming South Africa's transport system. The party wants the taxi industry to be subsidised. The party launched its manifesto on 23 March 2019.
- The Christian Political Movement (CPM) is an Eastern Cape-based Christian political party led by Brian Mahlati. The party was formed in 2014 but only registered with the IEC in 2018.
- The Compatriots of South Africa (CSA) was formed in 2018. The party's president is Cheslin Felix. The party aimed to represent disaffected Coloured South Africans. The party launched its manifesto on 30 March 2019.
- The Democratic Liberal Congress (DLC) was formed in 2016 by former Minority Front councillor, Patrick Pillay. In 2016, the party won one seat on the eThekwini City Council. The party is opposed to land expropriation without compensation, affirmative action and racial quotas.
- The Economic Emancipation Forum (EcoForum) was initially formed in 2013 but was officially launched as a political party in 2017. The party's president is BJ Langa.
- The Forum 4 Service Delivery (F4SD) was established in 2015 by party president Mbahare Kekana. The party contested the 2016 municipal elections and formed coalition agreements with the African National Congress. The party launched its manifesto on 25 March 2019.
- The Land Party is led by Gcobani Ndzongana. The party grew out of land access and housing protests in Zwelihle, Hermanus in 2018. The party launched its manifesto on 21 March 2019.
- The National People's Front (NAPF) was formed in 2018 by former National Deputy Chairperson of the National Freedom Party, Bheki Gumbi.
- Power of Africans Unity (PAU) was formed in Kroonstad in November 2016, with former COPE member Julius Nsingwane as its party president.
- The South African National Congress of Traditional Authorities (Sancota) was formed in 2019 on a platform of traditional African values and protecting the power of traditional leaders. The party's leader is Chief Mantjolo Mnisi. The party has managed to secure the defections of many ANC councillors in the Emalahleni Local Municipality.
- The National People's Ambassadors (NPA) was formed in 2015. In 2016, the party laid charges of high treason against Julius Malema.
- The People's Revolutionary Movement (PRM) is a political party founded in November 2016 by former African National Congress councillor Nhlanhla Buthelezi in the KwaZulu-Natal province. The party launched its manifesto on 17 February 2019.
- The International Revelation Congress (IRC) is a conservative Limpopo-based political party. Initially formed in 2013, the party contested the national elections for the first time in 2019. The party did contest the 2016 municipal elections and won one seat in the Thulamela Local Municipality.
- The Free Democrats (FREE DEMS) is a single-issue political party, mainly focusing on the issue of healthcare. The party is led by Johan Reid.
- The African Congress of Democrats (ACD) also contested the general elections. The party shares its name with a Namibian opposition party.

== Provincial-only ==
The following parties contested at the provincial level only:

- Aboriginal Khoisan (Northern Cape)
- African Change Academy (Eastern Cape)
- African Mantungwa Community (Kwazulu-Natal)
- African Peoples Socialist Party (Limpopo)
- African Progressive Movement (Western Cape)
- All Things Are Possible (Western Cape)
- Bolsheviks Party of South Africa (Limpopo)
- Cape Party (Western Cape)
- Civic Warriors of Maruleng (Limpopo)
- Dienslewerings Party (Western Cape)
- Gaza Movement for Change (Limpopo)
- Gazankulu Liberation Congress (Gauteng, Limpopo)
- Green Party of South Africa (Western Cape)
- Justice and Employment Party (Kwazulu-Natal)
- Karoo Democratic Force (Western Cape)
- Khoisan Revolution (Northern Cape, Western Cape)
- Magoshi Swaranang Movement (Limpopo)
- New South Africa Party (Western Cape)
- National Peoples Ambassadors (Kwazulu-Natal)
- National Religious Freedom Party (Kwazulu-Natal)
- People's Republic of South Africa (Western Cape)
- Plaaslike Besorgde Inwoners (Eastern Cape, Western Cape)
- Reikemeste Dikgabo Party (North-West)
- Residence Association of South Africa (Mpumalanga)
- Sindawonye Progressive Party (Mpumalanga)
- South African Concerned Residents Association 4 Service Delivery (Free State)
- South African Political Party (North-West)
- United Christian Democratic Party (North-West)
- Uniting People First (North-West)
- Ximoko Party (Limpopo)
- Zenzeleni Progressive Movement (Gauteng, Mpumalanga)

== Party defections ==
Former Mayor of Cape Town, Patricia de Lille, resigned from the Democratic Alliance on 31 October 2018. Various City of Cape Town councillors resigned along with her, including Mayoral Committee Member for Transport Brett Herron, and City of Cape Town Chief Whip, Shaun August. De Lille has since formed a new political party named Good.

On 30 December 2018, former DA Western Cape MPP and current special advisor to the minister of police Bheki Cele, Lennit Max, announced his resignation from the Democratic Alliance and subsequently joined the ANC. The DA had allegedly pressured Max to resign as a party member when he was appointed special advisor in July 2018.

The United Democratic Movement welcomed former deputy party president of the NFP, Sindi Maphumulo-Mashinini, to the party on 2 February 2019.

On 17 February 2019, African National Congress Member of Parliament, Dr Zukile Luyenge, resigned from the ANC and consequently joined the African Transformation Movement. Luyenge was a member of the ANC for thirty years and was elected MP in 2009. The Office of the ANC Chief Whip in the National Assembly confirmed the resignation.

On 2 March 2019, four Eastern Cape Democratic Alliance members resigned from the party and joined the African Transformation Movement. All of the ex-DA members had previously served as municipal councillors. On the same day, ANC, DA and EFF party T-shirts were burnt by defectors to the Minority Front at the party's manifesto launch.

Former Eastern Cape ANC Transport MEC, Thandiswa Marawu, defected to the African Transformation Movement on 11 March 2019.

On 13 March 2019, it was announced that former Provincial Leader of the Democratic Alliance in KwaZulu-Natal, Sizwe Mchunu, and several DA Msunduzi Local Municipality councillors, defected to the African National Congress. National Freedom Party MPL, Njabulo Mlaba, also defected to the ANC.

Former provincial chairperson of the Economic Freedom Fighters, Themba Wele, defected to the African Transformation Movement on 15 March 2019.

On 26 March 2019, former ANC MP Vytjie Mentor announced that she was joining the African Christian Democratic Party.
