= 2019 Democratic Alliance Federal Council chairpersonship election =

South African election

- 20 October 2019
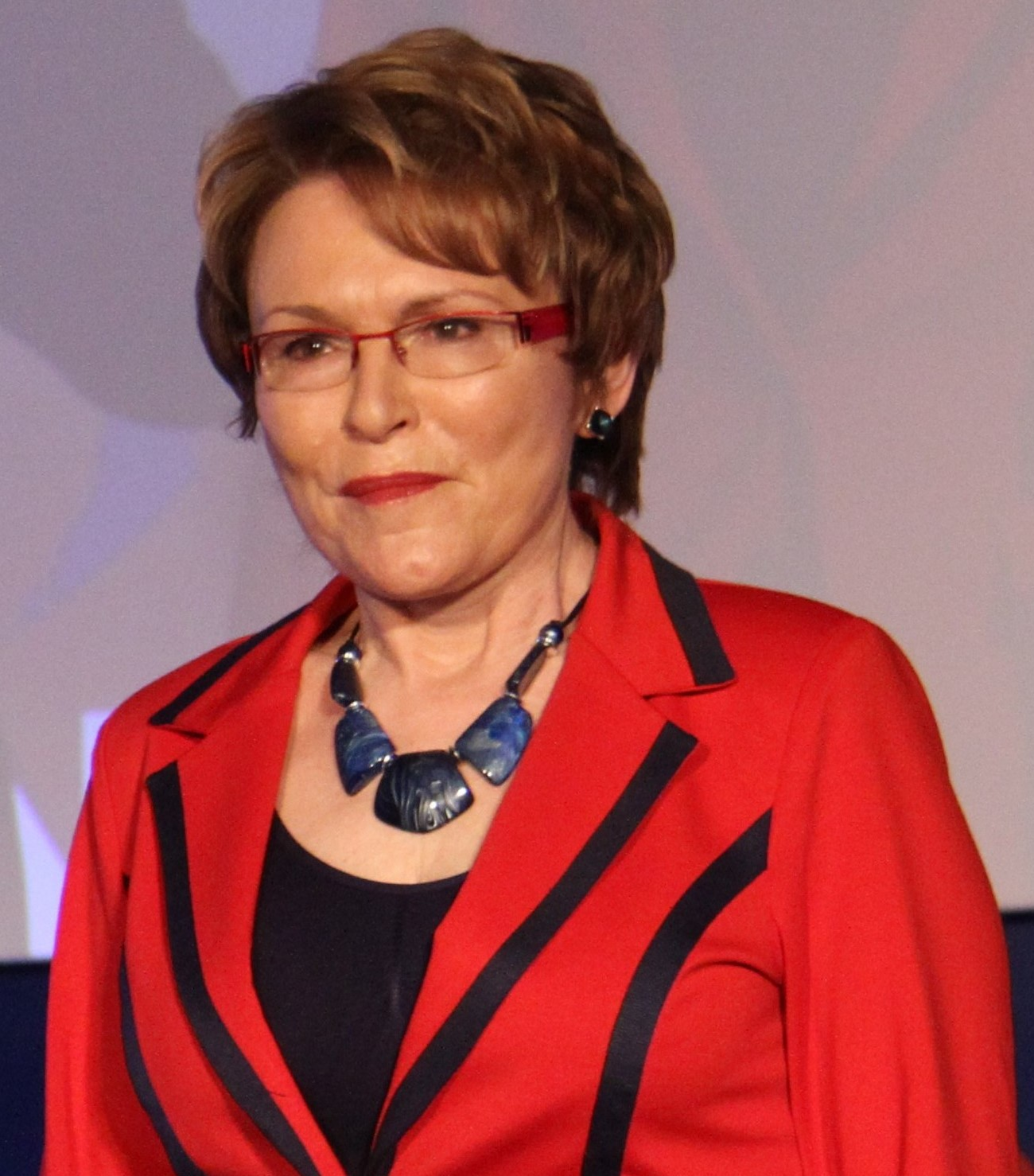

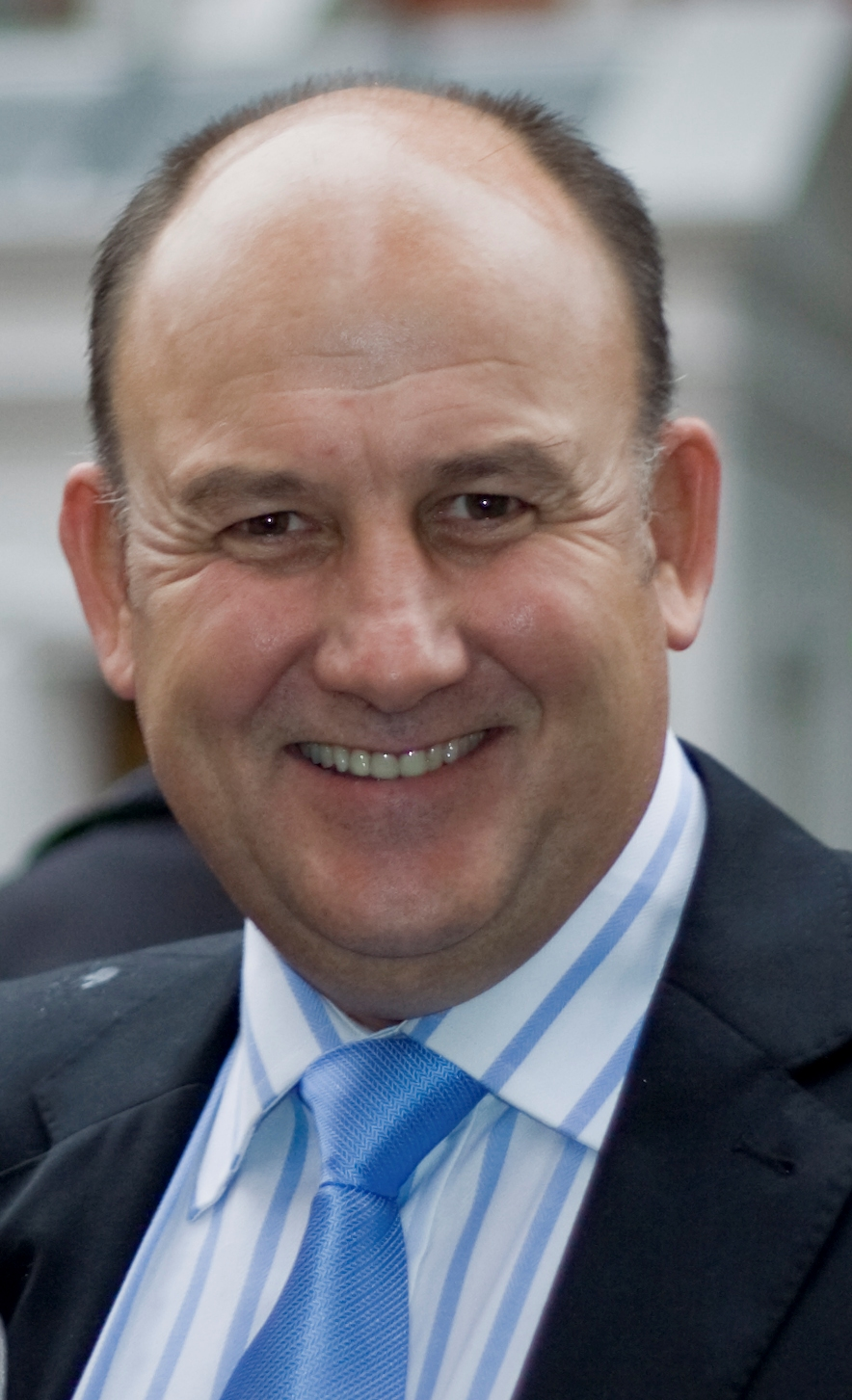

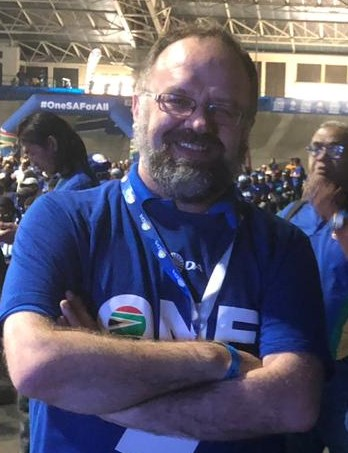

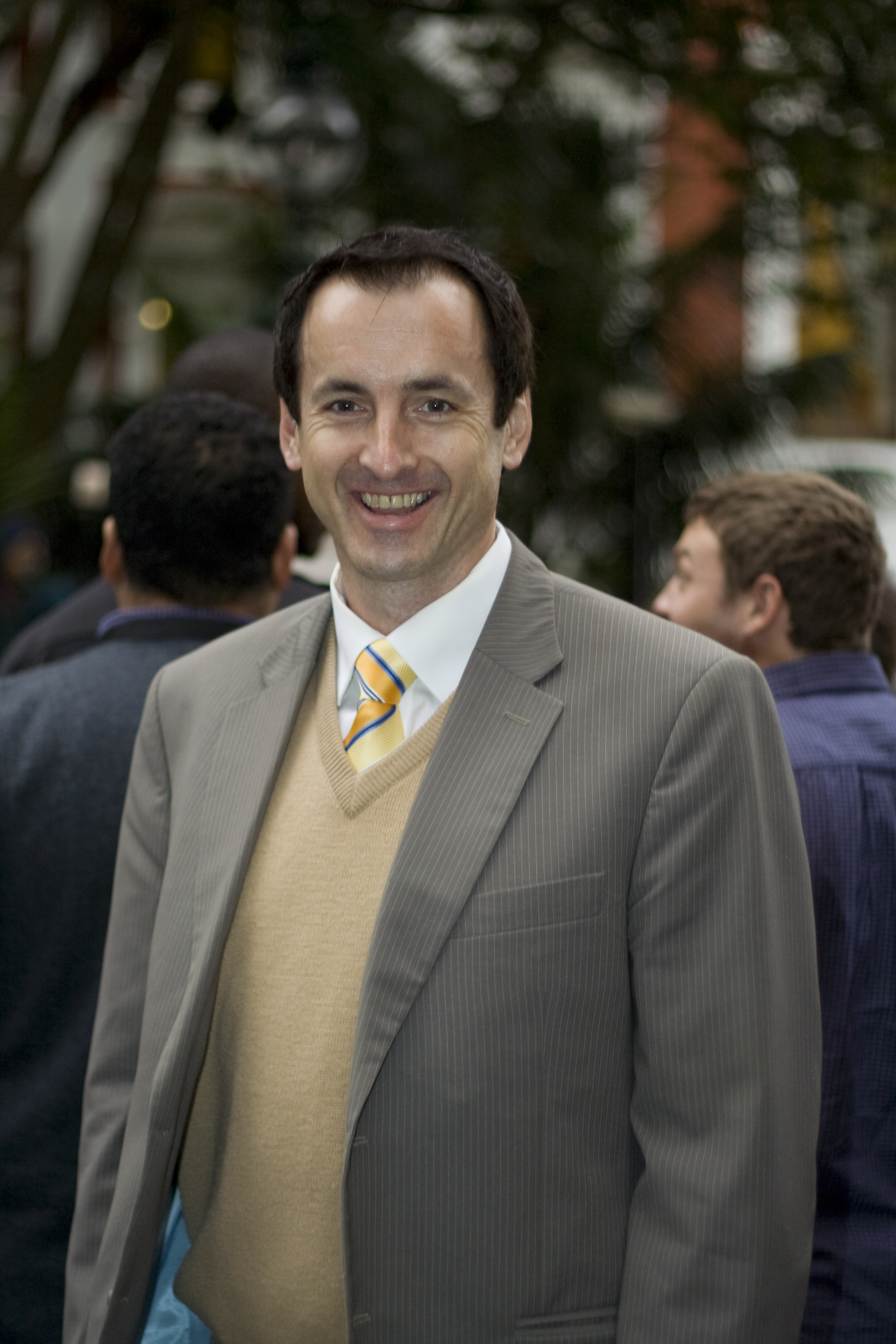
Candidate	Helen Zille	Athol Trollip
Popular vote	Elected	Not elected
Candidate	Thomas Walters	Mike Waters
Popular vote	Not elected	Not elected
Chairperson before election
James Selfe
Elected Chairperson
Helen Zille

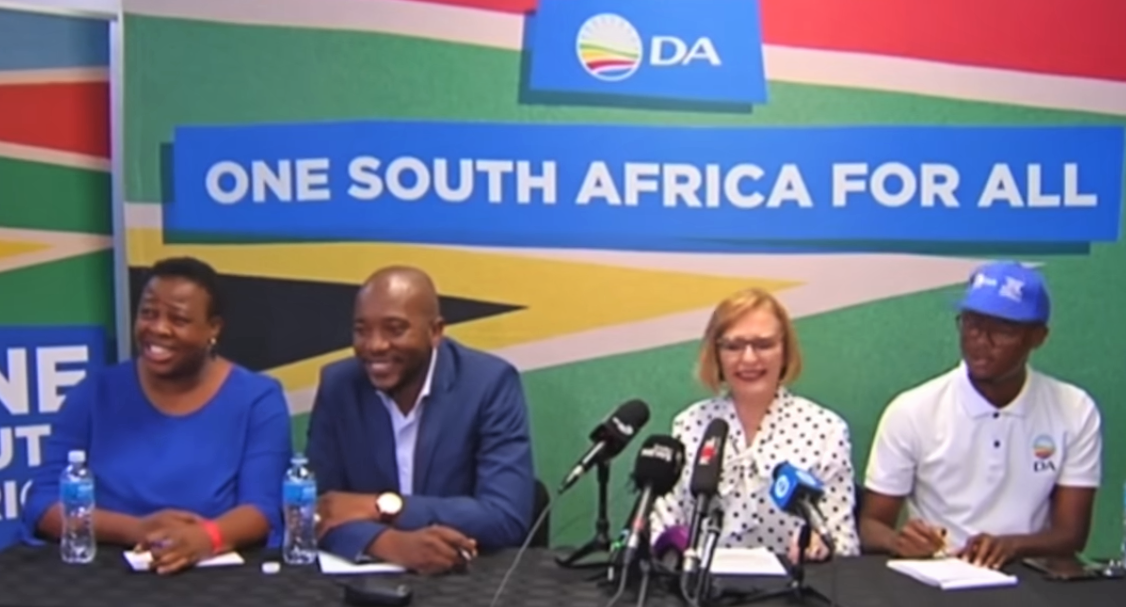
Press conference announcing Helen Zille as the new Federal Council Chairperson

The 2019 Democratic Alliance Federal Council chairpersonship election was held on 20 October 2019 to elect the new Chairperson of the South African Federal Council of the Democratic Alliance (DA), after the incumbent James Selfe had announced his retirement in June 2019.

The members of the party's Federal Council elected the new chairperson. Helen Zille was elected to the position.

== Background ==
In June 2019, James Selfe announced his retirement from the post of Chairperson of the Federal Council of the DA. He served in the post for almost two decades under the leadership of Tony Leon, Helen Zille and Mmusi Maimane. The leadership position is similar to that of the role of Secretary-General of the ruling African National Congress (ANC).

In recent months, the DA had been plagued by infighting and disorder. The party unsuccessfully tried to grow its vote share in the May 2019 national elections, only to be met with its first electoral decline in its history. This consequently caused leadership uncertainty within the party.

== Candidates ==
The candidate nomination process closed on 4 October 2019 at around 17:00. Four candidates declared their intention to contest the election and were as follow:

- Athol Trollip, Federal Party Chairperson
- Thomas Walters, Deputy Party Federal Council Chairperson
- Mike Waters, Deputy Federal Party Chairperson
- Helen Zille, former Party Leader

== Results ==
On 20 October 2019, DA Spokesperson Solly Malatsi tweeted that Helen Zille had been elected to the post. The party soon confirmed her election.
