= Moakes =

Moakes is a surname. Notable people with the surname include:

- Gordon Moakes (born 1976), English musician
- Jonathan Moakes (fl. from 2003), South African political administrator and strategist
