= Jonathan Moakes =

South African politician

Jonathan Moakes is a South African political administrator and strategist who worked as chief executive officer of the Democratic Alliance, the second largest political party in the country. He is now employed as chief of staff for party leader Mmusi Maimane.

== Background ==
Moakes was born in Northampton, England and moved to South Africa at the age of three months. He was schooled in Cape Town, and obtained a B.Com in Economics and an LLB from the University of Cape Town, winning the UCT Law Faculty's Human Rights Moot Court competition in 2003.

== Professional political career ==
He worked in the DA's fundraising department, succeeding David Maynier as the party's Director of Fundraising in July 2007. In February 2008 he was appointed to head up the DA's Western Cape registration campaign, and also to oversee the party's support service operations. He was appointed Executive Director of Political Activity and Campaigns in July 2008, and worked alongside party CEO Ryan Coetzee in running the party's ground operations during the 2009 general elections.

He subsequently succeeded Coetzee as the party's CEO in July 2009, and now works as Chief of Staff for party leader Mmusi Maimane.

== Controversy ==
In August 2011, Moakes led a staff reshuffle at the DA's head office, which was criticized for leaving the party with an all-white team of top executives and including the hiring of his wife Khurshed as executive director of support services. However, the party's federal executive chairperson James Selfe stated that Moakes had recused himself from his wife's hiring process.

Party political offices
Preceded by Ryan Coetzee	Chief Executive Officer of the Democratic Alliance; 2009–present	Incumbent
