= Ryan Coetzee =

South African politician (born 1973)

- Born: 8 January 1973 (age 53); South Africa
- Citizenship: South African
- Political party: Democratic Alliance (South Africa)

Ryan Coetzee (born 8 January 1973) is a South African politician and political strategist, who served as special adviser to Deputy Prime Minister of the United Kingdom Nick Clegg and was the 2015 General Election Director of Strategy at Liberal Democrat HQ. In 2016, he was director of strategy for the campaign for the UK to remain in the EU.

He previously served as a Member of South Africa's Parliament between 2004 and 2008, as CEO of South Africa's official opposition party, the Democratic Alliance between 2004 and 2009, and as the party's general election campaign chief in 2006, 2009, and 2011. He served as chief adviser to Western Cape Premier Helen Zille between 2009 and 2012.

== Background ==
Coetzee holds a Bachelor of Arts and a Higher Diploma in Education, both from the University of Cape Town.

== Career in politics ==
=== South Africa ===
In 1997 Coetzee was picked by DP leader Tony Leon to head up the party's parliamentary operations at the age of 24. Leon subsequently noted Coetzee's appointment as "the most significant" he made during his 13-year tenure as leader of the party. From 1999, Coetzee was the party's chief strategist, playing a central role in the party's election campaigns, which saw the DA grow from 1.7% in 1994 to 24.2% in the 2011 local government elections.

In April 2004 Coetzee became a Member of Parliament, and was assigned the shadow health portfolio. Six months later he asked then President Thabo Mbeki during a Parliamentary debate whether he believed the high rate of sexual violence in South Africa contributed towards the spread of HIV, and whether the President actually believed HIV causes AIDS. Mbeki responded by accusing Coetzee of succumbing to the "disease of racism", but avoided responding directly, thus reigniting criticism of his government's response to the pandemic.

In 2005, Coetzee was appointed the DA's CEO, in which role he radically reorganised the party and its finances, and designed and managed the 2006 local government election campaign and the 2009 general election campaign. In 2008, he oversaw a relaunch of the party designed to position it as a party of government, and not merely one of opposition.

In 2009, Coetzee resigned as party CEO to become a Special Advisor to the Premier of the Western Cape and party leader Helen Zille, with a brief to co-ordinate government policy and strategy. He was succeeded as DA CEO by Jonathan Moakes.

=== United Kingdom ===
In September 2012, in a surprise move, Nick Clegg appointed Coetzee strategy director of the Liberal Democrats in Britain. In late October 2013 it was announced that Coetzee might return to South Africa and was being offered a Western Cape provincial cabinet post by the DA. However, in August 2014 he instead switched to a job at Liberal Democrat party HQ, becoming the General Election Director of Strategy, for which he was reportedly paid a salary of £110,000.

The Liberal Democrats fared very badly in the 2015 General Election, losing all but eight of their seats. Coetzee is viewed as having led the party into oblivion. Writing for The Guardian after the result, Coetzee said, "We got routed by what I call the Fear. We presumed from the beginning that the Conservatives would try to scare voters with the prospect of a Miliband government that would risk the economy. But in the event the polls and the SNP conspired to ratchet up the Fear to Terror levels, because they showed Labour’s only path to power would be via the SNP."

During the summer of 2015 Coetzee joined Britain Stronger in Europe, a pro-European referendum campaign organisation, after being recruited by former Labour MP Peter Mandelson. The campaign was seen as lacking in charismatic leadership. As Director of Strategy for the 'Stronger In' campaign, Coetzee was relatively quiet, writing publicly once in a South African newspaper to comment on the 2016 UK budget and difficulties within the UK Conservative Party. Coetzee worked with Andrew Cooper on the Stronger In's strategy and messaging, conducting focus groups of voters. In the June 2016 referendum the UK voted to leave the EU, and Ryan Coetzee blamed the defeat in a tweet on "25 years of right wing tabloid propaganda".

=== Hong Kong ===
In 2020, Coetzee was reported to be heading up a £5m marketing campaign for the Hong Kong government as part of his work at PR firm Consulum. This marketing campaign is the response of the Hong Kong Executive to the 2019–20 Hong Kong protests which has seen Hong Kong and China accused of reneging on the Sino-British Joint Declaration which had promised Hong Kong would be kept separate from China's authoritarian rule for 50 years from 1997.

Party political offices
Preceded by None	Chief Executive Officer of the Democratic Alliance; 2004 – 2009	Succeeded by Jonathan Moakes
