= Bicks Ndoni =

South African politician (1958–2020)

Bicks Ndoni (7 May 1958 – 20 January 2020) was a South African politician who served as chief whip of the Nelson Mandela Bay Metropolitan Municipality from August 2018 until his death in January 2020. He was previously the deputy mayor of Nelson Mandela Bay under the mayoralty of Danny Jordaan. Ndoni served as the mayor of Uitenhage transitional council in the 1990s. He was an African National Congress (ANC) politician.

== Political career ==
Following the 1995–96 South African municipal elections, he became a municipal councillor. He was soon appointed mayor of the Uitenhage transitional council.

In 2000, he was elected a councillor of the inaugural Nelson Mandela Bay City Council.

Ndoni became the deputy mayor of Nelson Mandela Bay in May 2015, as the ANC announced a leadership reshuffle in the municipality. He served alongside Danny Jordaan until the ANC administration was ousted in the August 2016 municipal election. He was succeeded by Mongameli Bobani of the United Democratic Movement (UDM).

In August 2018, Ndoni took office as the chief whip of the council.

== Death ==
Ndoni died on 20 January 2020 at the ANC's regional headquarters, Florence Matomela House, in Port Elizabeth. He had suffered a heart attack. He was 61 years old. Various politicians of multiple political parties sent their condolences. He is survived by his wife Mpho and their children.
