= Not Without a Fight (book) =

2016 autobiography by South African politician Helen Zille

Not Without a Fight: The Autobiography
- Front cover art for Not Without a Fight.
- Author: Helen Zille
- Language: English
- Subject: Politics of South Africa
- Genre: Autobiography
- Published: Cape Town
- Publisher: Penguin Books
- Publication date: October 2016
- Publication place: South Africa
- Pages: 529
- ISBN: 978-1-77609-042-6 (Hardcover)

Not Without a Fight: The Autobiography is a 2016 autobiography by South African politician Helen Zille.

== Background and synopsis ==
Zille was the Premier of the Western Cape. She had previously served as Mayor of Cape Town and as Leader of the Democratic Alliance. In the book Zille details her life, from her early start as a liberal journalist and staunch opponent of apartheid to her lengthy career in local, provincial and national politics in South Africa.

== Reception ==
In Mail & Guardian Shaun de Waal wrote that he was surprised to find Zille's book so "engaging", also writing that Not Without a Fight "must be one of the most readable of the many autobiographies by political figures to have emerged in South Africa"

In the Daily Maverick Palesa Morudu described the work as "revealing, colourful, scathing, and more than a little exhausting" and that Zille "accounts for her life with pace, clarity, drama, suspense and humour"
