= Mongameli Bobani =

South African politician and lawyer (1968–2020)

Mayor of Nelson Mandela Bay
- In office 27 August 2018 – 5 December 2019
- Deputy: Thsonono Buyeye
- Preceded by: Athol Trollip
- Succeeded by: Thsonono Buyeye (interim); Nqaba Bhanga

Deputy Mayor of Nelson Mandela Bay
- In office 18 August 2016 – 24 August 2017
- Mayor: Athol Trollip
- Preceded by: Bicks Ndoni
- Succeeded by: Thsonono Buyeye (2018)

Personal details
- Born: 12 July 1968
- Died: 11 November 2020 (aged 52)
- Party: United Democratic Movement
- Children: 5
- Occupation: Politician, lawyer

Mongameli Bobani (12 July 1968 – 11 November 2020) was a South African politician and lawyer. He served as the Executive Mayor of Nelson Mandela Bay Metropolitan Municipality from August 2018 until December 2019. He was previously the Deputy Executive Mayor and the Member of Mayoral Committee for Public Services.

== Early life ==
Mongameli Bobani was born on 12 July 1968, the son of Vumile Bobani and Nomvuyo Gladys Mawa.

== Political career ==
Bobani was appointed as proportional representation councillor for the United Democratic Movement in 2002. He was the leader of the United Democratic Movement's caucus in the Nelson Mandela Bay council. Under his leadership, the UDM gained Ward 30 from the African National Congress in a by-election that took place in 2015. The party later lost the ward in the 2016 municipal elections.

In 2016, the UDM announced that Bobani would be the party's mayoral candidate for the Nelson Mandela Bay municipality in the upcoming 2016 municipal elections. His main focus points were job creation, service delivery and eradicating corruption. He announced that the party would be targeting 40 wards. The party later won no wards, but earned 1.9% of the vote giving them two seats on the council.

After the 2016 municipal elections, no party had received an outright majority on the Nelson Mandela Bay council with Democratic Alliance as the largest party with 57 seats, four seats short of a necessary majority of 61 seats. The Democratic Alliance announced that they would enter a coalition with the United Democratic Movement, Congress of the People and African Christian Democratic Party, giving them an effective majority of 61 seats on the council. The UDM later withdrew and was replaced by the Patriotic Alliance. On 18 August 2016, Athol Trollip was elected Executive Mayor with Bobani as Deputy Executive Mayor. Bobani succeeded Bicks Ndoni, who was appointed in May 2015. Athol Trollip announced that Bobani would take up the position as Member of Mayoral Committee for Public Health.

In May 2017, Mayor Athol Trollip released a statement announcing that he had removed Bobani as MMC for Public Health. Trollip stated that the Public Health Directorate had been a concern, given that serious allegations of maladministration and impropriety were made. He also called Bobani's public behaviour and conduct unacceptable.

In August 2017, the Patriotic Alliance councillor brought forward a motion of no confidence against Bobani to remove him as Deputy Executive Mayor of Nelson Mandela Bay. The opposition parties, including Bobani, staged a walkout when the Speaker did not allow more than one member of each political party to debate the motion. The Speaker Jonathan Lawack announced after the vote that the motion had passed with 60 members in favour of his removal. Bobani subsequently filed an urgent application to be reinstated as Deputy Executive Mayor, since the meeting was deemed illegal by opposition parties because they alleged there was no quorum. The Eastern Cape High Court dismissed the application. The UDM released a statement stating that the party had withdrawn from the coalition agreement. The Patriotic Alliance replaced the UDM, but later also withdrew.

In December 2017, Trollip announced that Lance Grootboom of the African Christian Democratic Party would fill the position of MMC for Public Health. The department was under Trollip's direct political rule since Bobani's dismissal in May.

== Mayor of Nelson Mandela Bay (2018–2019) ==
=== Election ===
On 27 August 2018, DA councillor Victor Manyati abstained from supporting his party's speaker, Jonathan Lawack. Lawack was removed from his position by 60 votes to 59. The DA and its supporters then left the council, and in their absence, Bobani was elected mayor, with 61 votes in favour and zero against. When Bobani was declared mayor, he immediately appointed a mayoral committee consisting almost entirely of ANC members, including controversial ANC councillor, Andile Lungisa. The Nelson Mandela Bay Metropolitan Municipality is now governed by a multi-party coalition consisting of the ANC, UDM, AIC and UF. The Democratic Alliance filed an urgent application after Bobani was elected to reinstate Trollip as mayor. The Eastern Cape High Court dismissed the application on 20 September 2018 and said that Democratic Alliance councillor, Victor Manyati, who voted with the opposition parties, was, in fact, a councillor until he resigned.

=== Tenure ===
In September 2018, he announced that new water tariffs would be introduced which would ensure that residents' municipal water bills be lowered. Recent rainfall had enabled the reduction of water tariffs from Part C to Part B. Also in September, he placed Johann Mettler, the municipal manager of the Nelson Mandela Bay, on precautionary suspension. Mettler was removed from office in November 2018.

The National Treasury's chief director for local government analysis has raised concerns over "alleged interference in supply chain management procedures" under Bobani's watch.

On 1 November 2018, the United Democratic Movement said that Bobani would submit his bank statements to the party following the report that detailed that money was paid into his account by a company alleged to have stolen funds meant for the city's bus system.

On 2 November 2018, a motion of no confidence failed to remove Bobani. The motion was brought forward by Councillor Lance Grootboom of the African Christian Democratic Party and Councillor Siyasanga Sijadu of the Congress of the People. Both councillors cited corruption and theft linked to the integrated public transport system (IPTS) as their reasons for tabling the motion. On 14 November 2018, the African Christian Democratic Party renewed its bid to remove Bobani as Mayor via a vote of no confidence.

On 22 November 2018, the Democratic Alliance proclaimed that the party would pursue a criminal case against Bobani. On 27 November 2018, the Democratic Alliance called on Cooperative Governance Minister Zweli Mkhize and his Eastern Cape MEC for Cooperative Governance counterpart to intervene in the Nelson Mandela Bay municipality. On 6 December 2018, Bobani survived another vote of no confidence that was tabled by opposition parties.

Bobani’s office had been criticised for late payments to contractors since his appointment. The Creditor's System Efficiency Ratio, a performance indicator used to measure the efficiency of paying creditors, has a target of 80% while Bobani’s office has reportedly scored only 64% and 55% respectively for September and October 2018.

On 2 April 2019, the Hawks confirmed that they had raided Bobani's residence and mayoral offices over allegations of tender fraud. They seized cellphones and a laptop belonging to his wife. This was the second raid in six months.

On 5 December 2019, he was removed as Mayor of Nelson Mandela Bay after a majority of councillors voted for his removal. He had in total survived five motions of no confidence.

== Mayoral Committee Member of Infrastructure and Engineering (2020) ==
In August 2020 Bobani was elected to the position of MMC for Infrastructure and Engineering in Nelson Mandela Bay by the interim mayor, Thsonono Buyeye. He replaced Andile Lungisa, former ANC councillor and convicted criminal, who held the position from 2018 to 2020. Bobani's appointment included responsibility for the Nelson Mandela Bay metro response to Day Zero water shortages in the region.

== Personal life ==
Bobani was a qualified lawyer. He was married and a father of five children.

== Death ==
Bobani died after he was hospitalised for three weeks with COVID-19.
