= Athol Trollip =

South African politician

The Honourable Athol Trollip
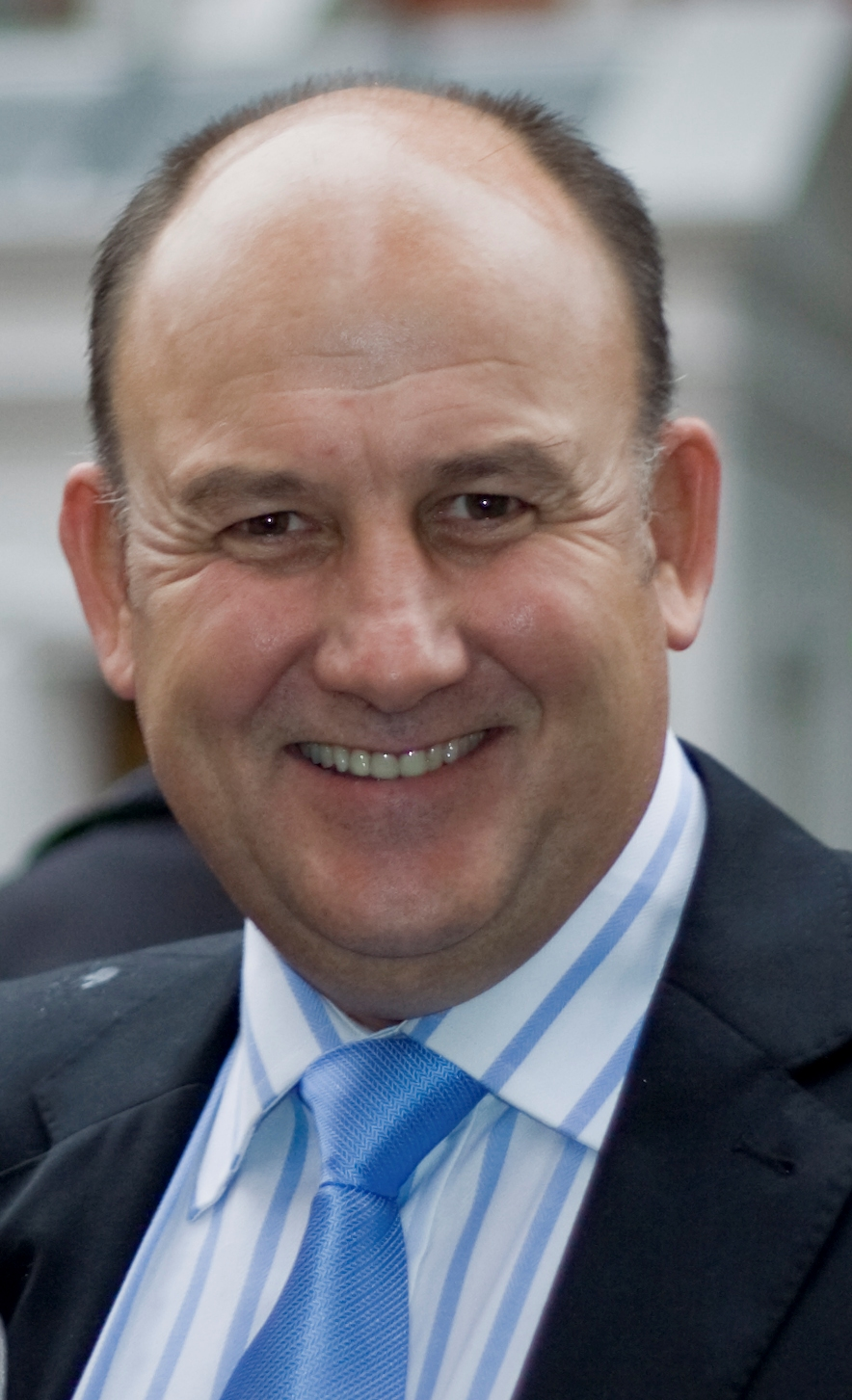

Provincial Chairman of ActionSA in Eastern Cape
- Incumbent
- Assumed office 9 February 2022
- Leader: Herman Mashaba

Federal Chairperson of the Democratic Alliance
- In office 10 May 2015 – 23 October 2019
- Preceded by: Wilmot James
- Succeeded by: Ivan Meyer (interim)

Leader of the Opposition
- In office 7 May 2009 – 27 October 2011
- President: Jacob Zuma
- Preceded by: Sandra Botha
- Succeeded by: Lindiwe Mazibuko

Member of the National Assembly
- Incumbent
- Assumed office 14 June 2024
- Constituency: National
- In office 6 May 2009 – 1 June 2013
- Constituency: National

Member of Eastern Cape Provincial Legislature
- In office 5 June 2013 – 18 August 2016

Mayor of Nelson Mandela Bay
- In office 18 August 2016 – 27 August 2018
- Deputy: Mongameli Bobani
- Preceded by: Danny Jordaan
- Succeeded by: Mongameli Bobani

Personal details
- Born: 12 March 1964 (age 62) Bedford, Cape Province, South Africa
- Party: ActionSA (since 2022)
- Other political affiliations: PFP (1980–1989); Democratic Alliance (1995–2020)
- Spouse: Janine Handley (m. 2016)
- Children: 2

Roland Athol Price Trollip (born 12 March 1964) is a South African politician and provincial chairman of ActionSA in the Eastern Cape.

He currently serves as the Parliamentary Leader of ActionSA in the National Assembly.

He was previously a member of the Democratic Alliance (DA), serving as the Federal Chairperson of the DA from 2015 to 2019 and the Executive Mayor of the Nelson Mandela Bay Metropolitan Municipality, serving from 2016 until he was unseated in a vote of no confidence in 2018.

Trollip has served as a member of the National Assembly and as a member of the Provincial Legislature of the Eastern Cape Province. He served as Parliamentary Leader of the opposition between 2009 and 2011. He was the provincial leader of the DA in the Eastern Cape from 2002 until he was replaced on 6 May 2017 by Nqaba Bhanga.

== Early life ==
Trollip was born in the town of Bedford in the Eastern Cape, attended Woodridge College, and studied Agricultural Management at the University of Natal in Pietermaritzburg.

== Career in politics ==
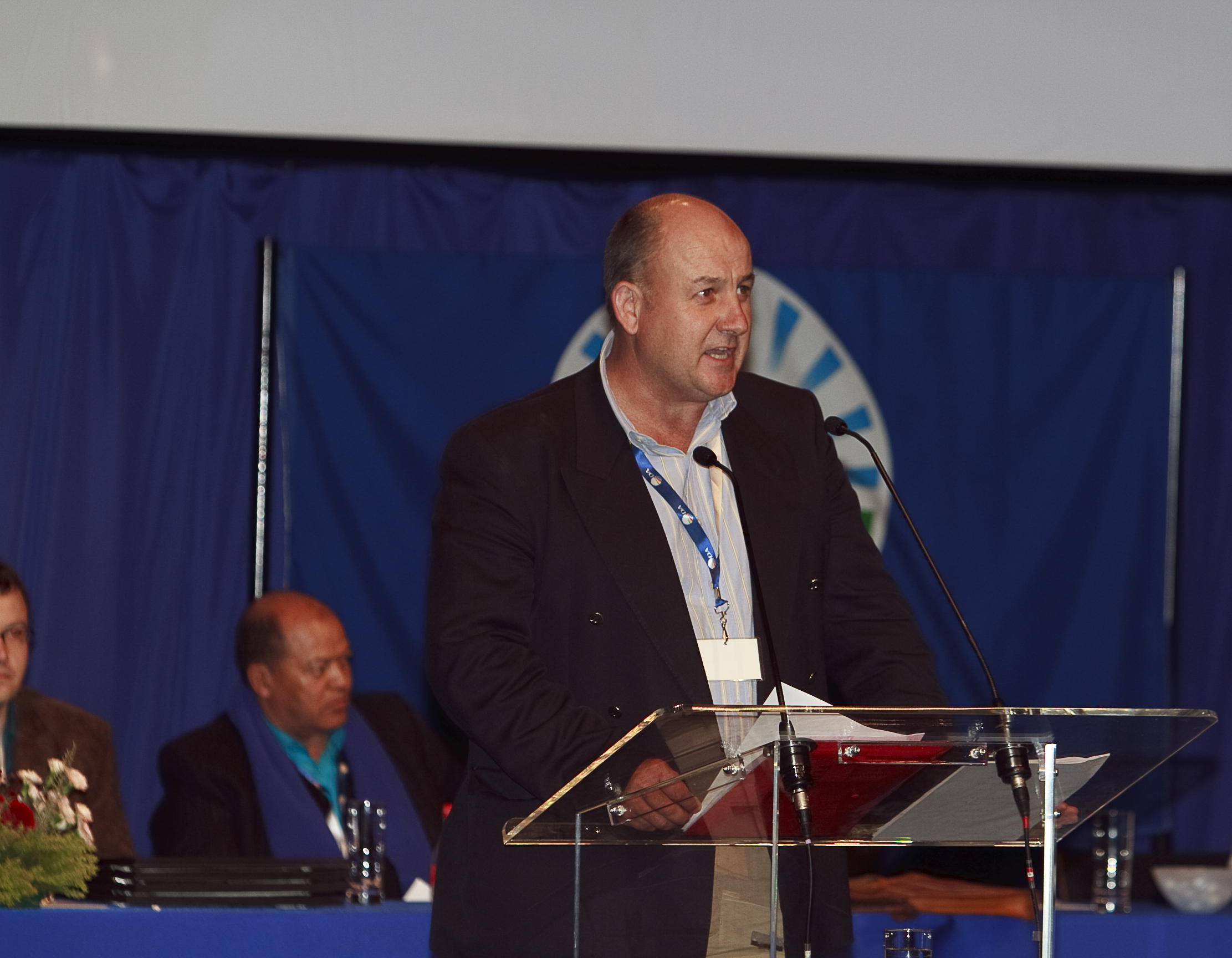
Trollip at the DA's 2010 Federal Congress

Trollip joined the liberal Progressive Federal Party in 1980. His political career began in earnest when he became a municipal councillor for the PFP's successor, the Democratic Party, in 1995. He was elected as provincial chairperson in 1998 and then as the renamed DA's leader in the Eastern Cape in 2002, a position he held for 15 years. Trollip served as a Member of the Eastern Cape Provincial Legislature between 1999 and 2009.

He unsuccessfully ran for party leader against Helen Zille in 2007.

In 2009, Trollip became a Member of Parliament in the National Assembly and after winning a leadership contest against Ryan Coetzee assumed the position of Parliamentary Leader of the DA. On 27 October 2011, Trollip was defeated in his bid for re-election as Parliamentary Leader of the DA by fellow MP Lindiwe Mazibuko. He later left the National Assembly to return to the Eastern Cape Legislature in 2013, and was the DA's premier candidate in the Eastern Cape province for the 2014 general election. During this time, Trollip was involved with Helen Zille in welcoming King Buyelekhaya Dalindyebo into the DA, despite his conviction on serious criminal charges. Dalindyebo was subsequently expelled from the DA when the conviction was upheld on appeal.

In 2015, Trollip returned to national prominence within the DA. On 13 April he was announced as the DA candidate for Mayor of Nelson Mandela Bay Metropolitan Municipality in the 2016 Local Government Elections, and was also elected as the Federal Chairperson of the DA at the party's Federal Congress in May.

In 2016, Trollip was referred to the South African Human Rights Commission (HRC) for alleged human rights abuses and unfair labour practices on the family farm near Bedford in the Eastern Cape, allegations that he strenuously denied. The HRC later abandoned the case, citing the difficulty of investigating events alleged to have happened between the 1970s and 2000s, and that the incidents happened before the current, constitutional dispensation and involved "issues of pre-jurisdiction".

== Later career ==
In the municipal elections held on 3 August 2016, the DA won a plurality of seats in the Nelson Mandela Bay Metropolitan Municipality. With the help of the smaller parties such as the United Democratic Movement, Congress of the People and the African Christian Democratic Party, Trollip was elected as mayor of that municipality. He served in the position for 2 years, under which the metro received a ratings upgrade from Moody's.

Tensions soon arose between Trollip and his deputy mayor from the UDM, Mongameli Bobani, requiring frequent interventions by the respective party leaderships to mend the relationship. The relationship eventually broke down and Bobani was ousted from the coalition in late 2017. After this, Trollip faced several no-confidence motions. One was tabled to be held on 30 March 2018. The vote was postponed, because the city council meeting descended into chaos due to the actions of the opposition parties.

In August 2018, DA councillor Victor Manyati abstained from voting in the no-confidence motion against the speaker, allowing the speaker to be removed. After the motion, the DA and its coalition partners left the council. The vote of no confidence in Trollip then occurred and succeeded. Bobani was then elected mayor with 61 votes in favour, and none against. The DA legally challenged the removal of Trollip as executive mayor. The party alleged that there was no longer a quorum in the council when the vote occurred as Manyati's party membership had been suspended after he abstained. However, the high court upheld Bobani's appointment, stating that Manyati had still been a DA member at the time and as such there was a quorum. Trollip subsequently assumed the post of leader of the opposition of the Nelson Mandela Bay council.

In October 2019, he declared his intention to run for the post of Chairperson of the DA's Federal Council. The election was held later in October and Trollip lost to Helen Zille. He resigned as the party's federal chair, and resigned from all active roles within the DA on 23 October 2019, following the resignation of Party Leader Mmusi Maimane. Trollip resigned as a DA councillor in December 2019, following the ousting of Mongameli Bobani.

Trollip joined the ActionSA political party in 9 February 2022.

== Personal life ==
Trollip is a fluent speaker of Afrikaans, English, and isiXhosa. He has two children. Trollip married Janine Handley on 5 November 2016 at Kasouga.

Political offices
Preceded by Danny Jordaan	Mayor of Nelson Mandela Bay Metropolitan Municipality; 2016-2018	Next: Mongameli Bobani
