= James Selfe =

South African politician (1955–2024)

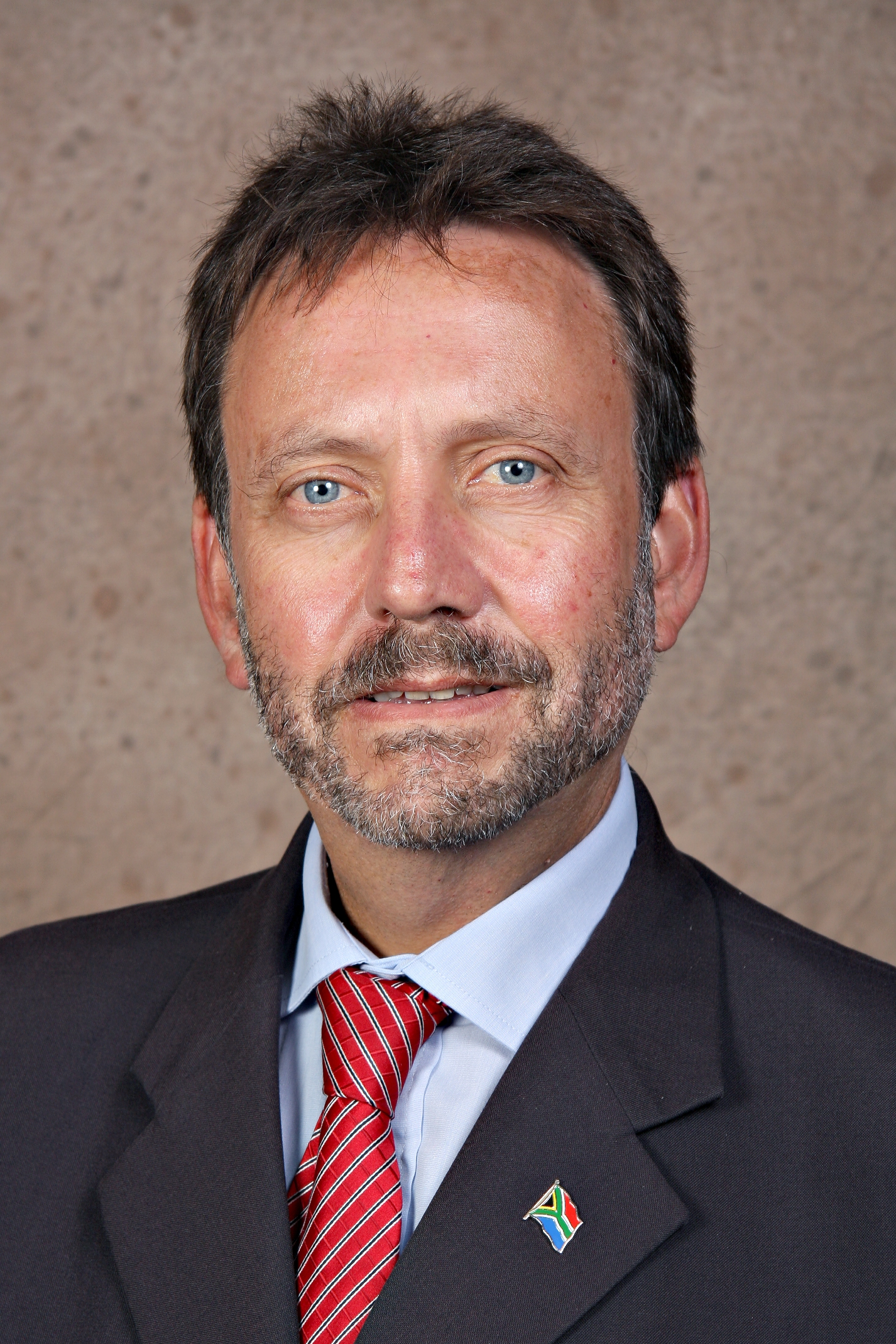
- Official portrait, 2009

Shadow Minister of Correctional Services
- In office 15 May 2009 – 31 December 2021
- Deputy: Werner Horn; Lennit Max
- Leader: Athol Trollip; Lindiwe Mazibuko; Mmusi Maimane; Annelie Lotriet (acting); John Steenhuisen
- Preceded by: Hendrik Schmidt

Chairperson of the Democratic Alliance Federal Council
- In office 24 June 2000 – 20 October 2019
- Leader: Tony Leon; Helen Zille; Mmusi Maimane; John Steenhuisen
- Preceded by: Position established
- Succeeded by: Helen Zille

Member of the National Assembly of South Africa
- In office 29 April 1994 – 31 December 2021
- Constituency: Western Cape

Personal details
- Born: 23 August 1955 Pretoria, Transvaal Province, Union of South Africa
- Died: 21 May 2024 (aged 68) Cape Town, South Africa
- Party: Democratic Alliance
- Spouse: Sheila Selfe
- Children: Stephanie, Chloe and Emma Selfe
- Education: University of Cape Town

James Selfe (23 August 1955 – 21 May 2024) was a South African politician who was a Member of Parliament for the opposition Democratic Alliance (DA), and the party's Federal Council Chairperson. He was also the party's Shadow Minister of Correctional Services. Selfe resigned from Parliament and as the Shadow Minister of Correctional Services with effect from 31 December 2021.

== Education and early career ==
Selfe was born in Pretoria, and attended Bishops (Diocesan College) and the University of Cape Town. After earning a master's degree, Selfe worked between 1979 and 1988 as a researcher for the Progressive Federal Party, the forerunner to today's Democratic Alliance. He became the party's communications director in 1988, and a member of the President's Council a year later. In 1992 he became an executive director of the party.

== Parliamentary career ==
Selfe was elected to the Senate of South Africa – later National Council of Provinces – in 1994 and participated in the Constitutional Assembly which drew up the democratic Constitution. In 1999 he stayed in parliament, but moved to the National Assembly. In 2004, he was re-elected to Parliament and became responsible for the Member of Portfolio Committee on Justice and Correctional Services in addition to being chair of the Democratic Alliance's Federal Council.

In June 2019, Selfe announced his retirement as chair of the Democratic Alliance's Federal Council. He had served in the post for almost two decades under the leadership of Tony Leon, Helen Zille and Mmusi Maimane.

In February 2021, Selfe appeared before the Zondo Commission to testify on Bosasa's catering contracts for the Department of Correctional Services. Selfe told the commission that his "many calls over many years" that Parliament should investigate Bosasa "fell on deaf ears".

After 43 years in politics, Selfe announced his retirement in November 2021 due to deteriorating health. On 10 December 2021, the National Assembly bid farewell to long-serving Selfe in its final sitting of 2021. During this sitting, members of Parliament from across the aisle praised Selfe for his contributions to South Africa.

== Death ==
Selfe died in his house in Cape Town on 21 May 2024, at the age of 68.
