= Helen Zille =

South African politician (born 1951)

The Honourable Helen Zille
- Zille in 2011

Chairperson of the Federal Council of the Democratic Alliance
- In office 20 October 2019 – 12 April 2026
- Deputy: Annelie Lotriet; Thomas Walters; James Masango; Ashor Sarupen
- Leader: John Steenhuisen; Mmusi Maimane
- Preceded by: James Selfe
- Succeeded by: Ashor Sarupen

Federal Leader of the Democratic Alliance
- In office 6 May 2007 – 10 May 2015
- Preceded by: Tony Leon
- Succeeded by: Mmusi Maimane

7th Premier of the Western Cape
- In office 6 May 2009 – 22 May 2019
- Preceded by: Lynne Brown
- Succeeded by: Alan Winde

Mayor of Cape Town
- In office 15 March 2006 – 30 April 2009
- Deputy: Grant Haskin
- Preceded by: Nomaindia Mfeketo
- Succeeded by: Grant Haskin (acting); Dan Plato

Member of the National Assembly of South Africa
- In office 14 April 2004 – 15 March 2006
- Constituency: Western Cape

Member of the Western Cape Provincial Parliament
- In office 6 May 2009 – 7 May 2019

Director of Communications and Public Relations at the University of Cape Town
- In office 15 June 1999 – 13 April 2004

Personal details
- Born: Otta Helene Zille; 9 March 1951 (age 75) Hillbrow, Johannesburg, Transvaal, South Africa
- Party: Democratic Alliance (2000–present)
- Other political affiliations: Democratic Party (before 2000)
- Spouse: Johann Maree (m. 1982)
- Children: 2
- Education: St Mary's School, Waverley; University of the Witwatersrand
- Occupation: Politician; legislator; activist
- Profession: Journalist

Otta Helene Zille (/ˈzɪlə/; born 9 March 1951), known as Helen Zille, is a South African politician. She served as the Chairperson of the Federal Council of the Democratic Alliance from October 2019 to April 2026. From 2009 until 2019, she was the Premier of the Western Cape province for two five-year terms, and a member of the Western Cape Provincial Parliament. She served as Federal Leader of the Democratic Alliance from 2007 to 2015 and as Mayor of Cape Town from 2006 to 2009.

Zille is a former journalist and anti-apartheid activist and was one of the journalists who exposed the cover-up around the death of Black Consciousness leader Steve Biko while working for the Rand Daily Mail in the late 1970s. She also worked with the Black Sash and other pro-democracy groups during the 1980s. Zille speaks English, Afrikaans, Xhosa, and German.

Following her departure from the premiership in May 2019, she joined the South African Institute of Race Relations as a senior policy fellow in July 2019, though she suspended her fellowship in October 2019. She started her own podcast, Tea with Helen, in August 2019. Zille has announced her intention to run for the mayorship of Johannesburg.

== Early life and career ==
=== Early years, education and family ===
Helen Zille was born in Hillbrow, Johannesburg, the eldest child of parents who separately left Germany in the 1930s to avoid Nazi persecution due to the fact that her maternal grandfather and paternal grandmother were Jewish.

Zille was believed to be the grandniece of the Berlin painter Heinrich Zille. She gave corresponding hints by herself in the past but withdrew them in her autobiography published in 2016. The Berlin genealogist Martina Rhode had documented before that there was a mix-up in the handwritten notes of her uncle Heinrich between people with the same name but different birthplaces and dates of birth.

Her mother was a volunteer with the Black Sash Advice Office. While her family lived in Rivonia, she was educated at Johannesburg's St Mary's School, Waverley, one of the city's private education schools. She studied at the University of the Witwatersrand, where she obtained a Bachelor of Arts degree. Around 1969, she joined the Young Progressives, the youth movement of the liberal and anti-apartheid Progressive Party.

=== Political journalism ===
Zille began her career as a political correspondent for the Rand Daily Mail newspaper in 1974. During September 1977, the South African Minister of Justice and the Police J.T. Kruger announced that anti-apartheid activist Steve Biko had died in prison as the result of an extended hunger strike. Zille and her editor Allister Sparks were convinced Kruger's story was a cover-up, and Zille obtained concrete proof of this after tracking down and interviewing doctors involved in the case.

Consequent to the publication of the story, headlined "No sign of hunger strike—Biko doctors", Minister Kruger immediately threatened to ban the newspaper, and Zille received death threats. Zille and Sparks were represented at the subsequent quasi-judicial Press Council by defence lawyer Sydney Kentridge. The two were found to be guilty of "tendentious reporting", and the paper was forced to issue a correction. Kentridge later helped confirm the accuracy of Zille's account when he represented the Biko family at the inquest into his death. That inquest found Biko's death had been the result of a serious head injury but failed to find any individual responsible.

Zille resigned from the Rand Daily Mail along with editor Allister Sparks, after the paper's owner, Anglo American, demanded that Sparks quit the paper's equal rights rhetoric.

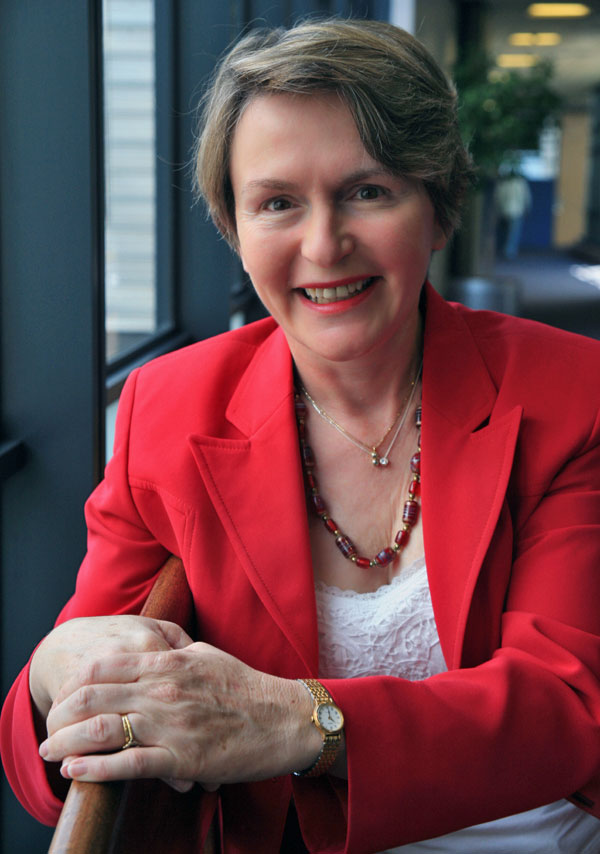
Helen Zille

=== Anti-apartheid movement ===
Zille was heavily involved in the Black Sash movement during the 1980s. She served on the regional and national executives of the organisation, and was also vice-chair of the End Conscription Campaign in the Western Cape. During this time, she was arrested for being in a "group area" without a permit and received a suspended prison sentence. Zille and her husband later offered their home as a safe house for political activists during the 1986 State of Emergency, and she was temporarily forced into hiding with their two-year-old son.

Zille was also actively involved in the South Africa Beyond Apartheid Project and the Cape Town Peace Committee. She later gathered evidence for the Goldstone Commission which investigated attempts to destabilise the Western Cape before the elections in 1994.

== Education policy work ==
Zille formed a public policy consultancy in 1989, and in 1993 she was offered the position of Director of Development and Public Affairs at the University of Cape Town. During this time Zille also chaired the governing body of Grove Primary School, and in 1996 led a successful challenge against government policy limiting governing bodies' powers to appoint staff.

Zille was then invited by the Democratic Party (now the Democratic Alliance) to write a draft policy for Education in the Western Cape. In 1999 she became a Member of the Western Cape Provincial Legislature and was appointed MEC for Education.

In 2004, Zille became a Member of Parliament with the DA. Within the DA, she rose to the level of deputy federal chairperson and served as national party spokesperson and spokesperson for education.

== Mayoralty ==
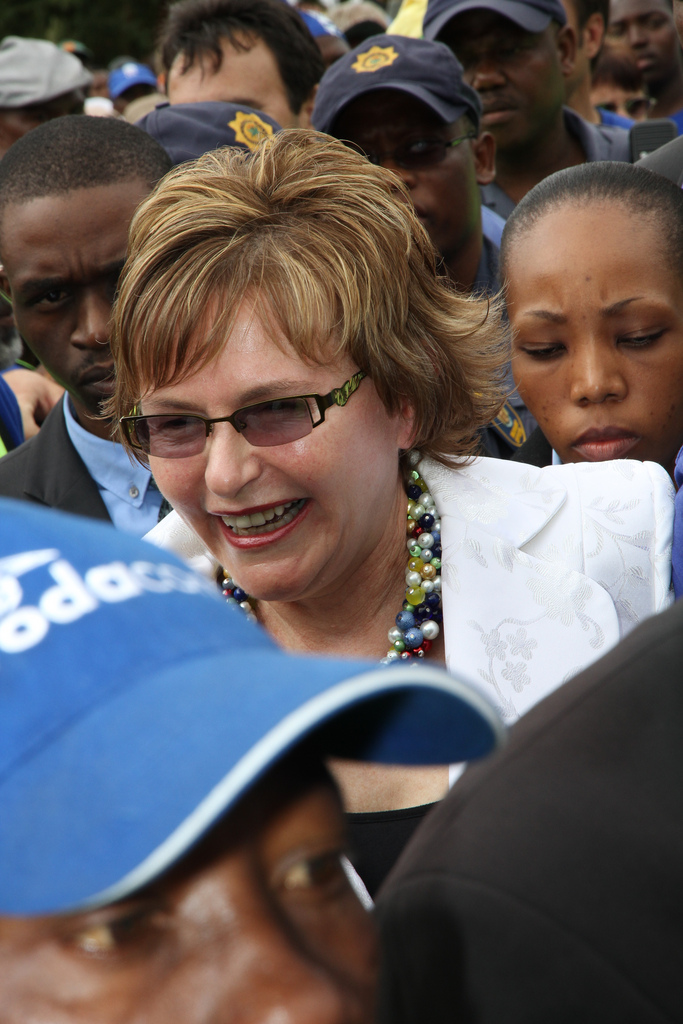
Freedom Day Rally 2011 at Solomon Mahlangu Freedom Square in Mamelodi

=== 2006 municipal elections and aftermath ===
In the 2006 municipal elections, the DA became the single largest party in Cape Town with 42.0% of the vote, ahead of the African National Congress (ANC). Zille was elected mayor by 106 votes to 103 on 15 March 2006, after the DA obtained the support of several smaller parties.

Subsequently, Zille's multi-party government decided to revoke the appointment of Cape Town City Manager Wallace Mgoqi, whose term of appointment had been extended by the outgoing ANC executive mayor, Nomaindia Mfeketo. Zille's decision was upheld by the High Court, which ruled that the extension of Mgoqi's appointment by the previous mayor had been unlawful.

Zille has faced considerable opposition and confrontation from the ANC. In September 2006, the provincial ANC MEC Richard Dyantyi announced that he planned to replace the city's mayoral system with an executive committee. The move would have resulted in reduced mayoral power, and the governing party would not itself have been able to assign the ten seats on the committee, which would instead have been allocated on a proportional representation basis. Dyanti and Zille agreed to retain the current mayoral system if the ANC were provided with two additional sub-committees in areas of the city controlled by the ANC. The matter was thus resolved.

=== Issues ===
Zille's commitments as mayor included Cape Town's role as a designated host city for the 2010 World Cup, as well as the construction and financing of the Cape Town Stadium, which hosted 8 FIFA World Cup football matches in 2010.

A particular concern of Zille's was the problem of drug abuse in Cape Town, especially crystal methamphetamine (tik) abuse. She called for the promotion of drug rehabilitation centres and further funding from the government to battle drug abuse and met with local communities to discuss the issue.

Zille objected to plans to incorporate the metro police into the broader police service, arguing that such a move would remove considerable power from local government and vest more control in the hands of the National Police Commissioner at the time, Jackie Selebi, who was later convicted of corruption.

=== Achievements ===
==== Housing and service delivery ====
Although provincial rather than local government is tasked with housing delivery, Zille claimed that her municipality's efforts to reform housing lists and improve verification processes also allowed housing delivery to be increased from 3000 units per annum under the ANC, to 7000 units per annum between 2006 and 2008 under her administration as mayor.

In an article titled "The ANC is pro-poverty not pro-poor" published shortly before the 2009 general election, Zille pointed out that no budget allocation existed for upgrading informal settlements under the ANC administration, whereas in 2007 her administration had set a dedicated budget for the provision of water, electricity, and sanitation.

== DA Leader ==
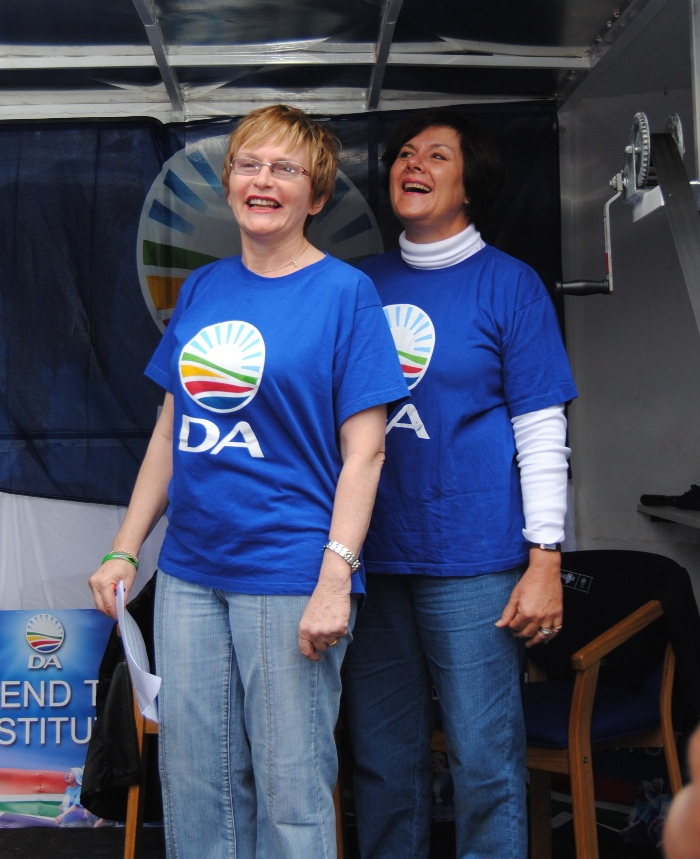
Zille and Gauteng DA leader Janet Semple in 2010

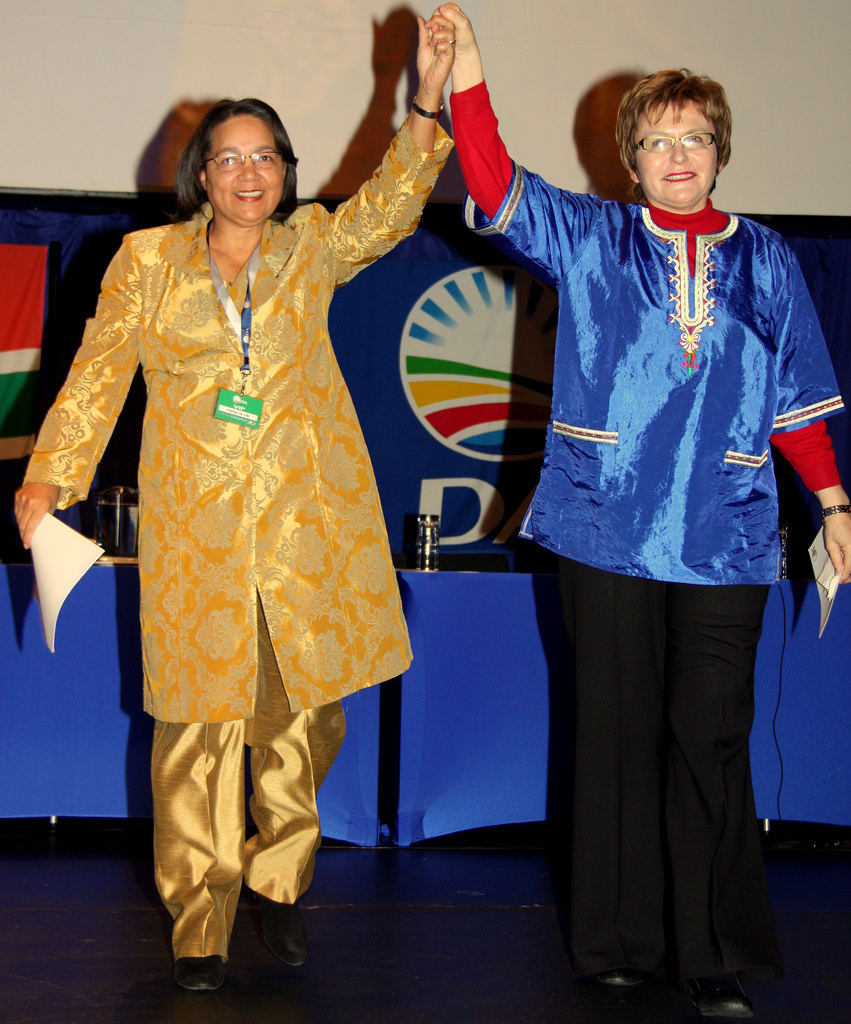
Helen Zille with former Mayor of Cape Town and current Leader of Good Patricia de Lille, at the DA Federal Congress in 2010

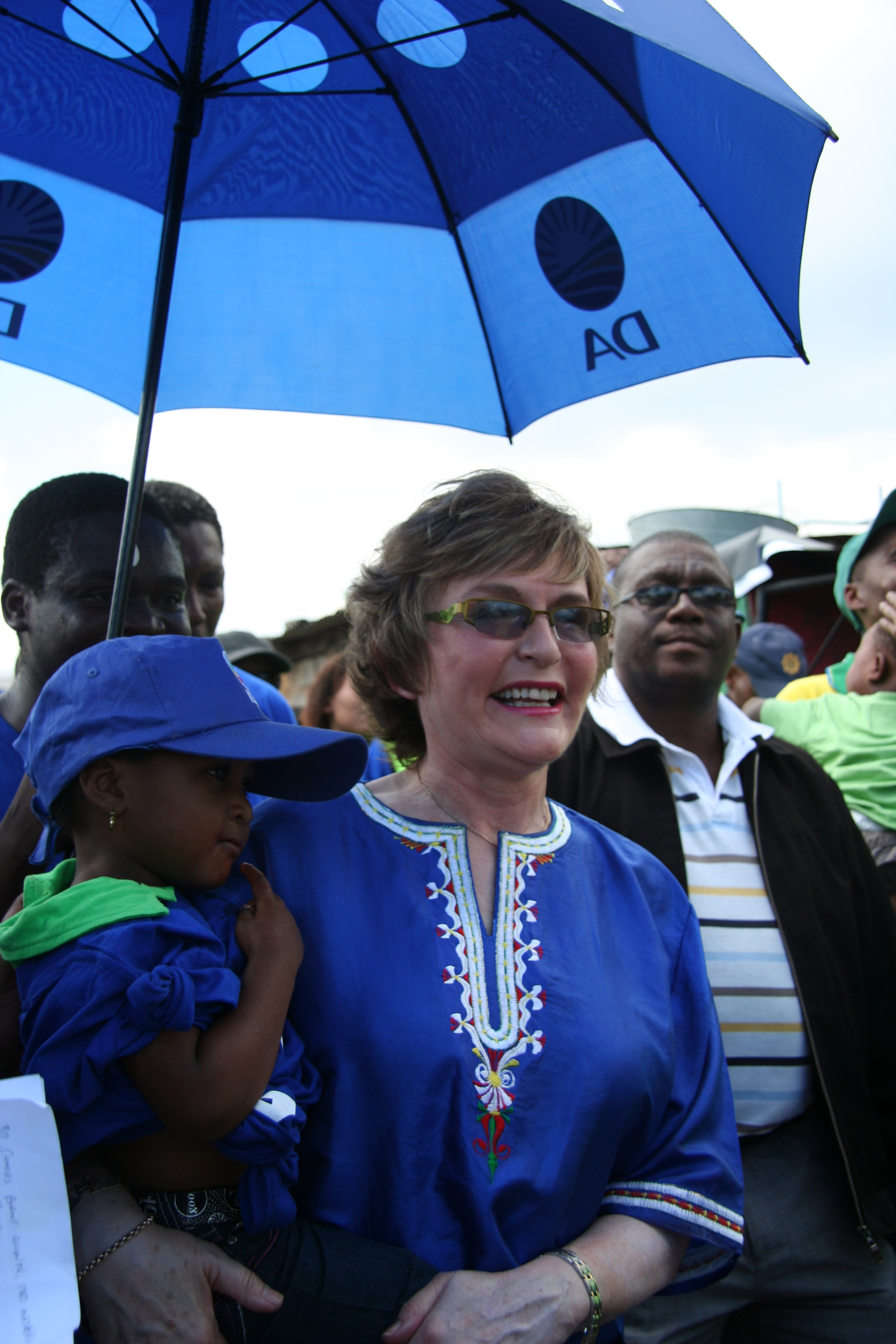
Zille campaigning in Mpumalanga ahead of the 2011 municipal elections

=== Election ===
On 15 March 2007, Zille declared herself a candidate to succeed outgoing leader of the DA, Tony Leon. A favourite from the start, with backing from the Western Cape, Gauteng, KwaZulu-Natal, Mpumalanga, the Northern Cape, the Free State and even the Eastern Cape (regarded during much of the build-up as the stronghold of main rival Athol Trollip), she was elected as the new leader by a large majority on 6 May 2007. She indicated that she would lead the party from outside Parliament, while continuing in her position as executive mayor of Cape Town.

=== Issues ===
When she became the leader of the DA, Zille challenged the majority government on several issues.

==== Crime ====
Of particular concern to Zille was the government's response to alarming crime statistics released in July 2007. She has accused the national government of rewarding criminals by placing individuals convicted of serious crimes high up on their national parliamentary lists. Zille has said that the DA would reinstate child protection units, the South African Narcotics Bureau and the Scorpions unit, all of which have been disbanded.

In August 2008, Zille announced proposals to boost the size of the police force to 250,000, employ an additional 30,000 detectives, improve detention programmes and use of information technology, and radically overhaul the justice system. She also said the party's comprehensive new crime plan would include provisions for a Victims of Crime Fund.

==== Health ====
Zille warned against the controversial National Health Amendment Bill, legislation allowing greater state intervention in private health care. She warned that the state would destroy the system. She outlined the possibility that the Bill could drive away thousands of skilled medical professionals. Together with her political party she proposed an alternative health plan for the privatisation of state healthcare. The National Health Amendment Act became law in 2013, providing for the establishment of a new Office of Health Standards Compliance.

==== Judicial independence ====
As DA leader, Zille has also frequently questioned judicial independence in South Africa, in light of the alleged behaviour of the Cape judge president John Hlophe in trying to influence the Constitutional Court judges to rule in favour of ANC president Jacob Zuma. She also cited racism directed towards those in the judiciary, and has criticised the perceived double standards vocally.

==== Political debate ====
In June 2008, she challenged the president of the ANC and the 2009 presidential candidate, Jacob Zuma to a public debate on ten key issues such as the arms deal, disbanding of the Scorpions, the situation in Zimbabwe, HIV/AIDS and labour legislation. Zuma declined to participate.

==== Campaign against drug and alcohol abuse ====
Eight members of a group called the People's Anti-Drug and Liquor Action Committee (PADLAC) were arrested in September 2007 outside the Mitchell's Plain police station. Zille was then arrested when she visited the police station to investigate. The group had been distributing pamphlets in the campaign against the abuse of alcohol and drugs in Cape Town. Police alleged that she supported vigilante groups opposed to drug abuse. She appeared in the Mitchell's Plain Magistrates Court later that week for contravening the Regulation of Gatherings Act. Zille was expected to sue the Minister of Police for wrongful arrest. Zille subsequently appeared briefly before the Mitchell's Plain Magistrates Court together with a group of ten persons who had been arrested with her.

On 30 September 2007 it was reported that senior intelligence sources, who were apparently unhappy with the ANC's plans to subvert state institutions to do ANC bidding, had leaked information to Zille that operatives with weapons were infiltrating PADLAC with the ultimate objective of bringing down the leader of the opposition. In October 2007, Zille was acquitted of all charges brought before the Mitchell's Plain Magistrates Court on the grounds that the prosecution's case against her and nine other defendants did not stand a chance of succeeding. Zille reiterated her intention to sue the South African Police Service (SAPS) branch in the Western Cape for wrongful arrest.

In March 2008, Helen Zille took her anti-drugs campaign to Johannesburg, leading a protest march. Marchers wore DA T-shirts, bearing the message No to drugs and save our children.

It is not clear that Zille's activities have had any particular impact on problems of crime and substance abuse in the Western Cape. The latest crime statistics suggest that the Western Cape is responsible for 34% of drug-related crime in South Africa.

=== United Nations ===
In April 2008, Zille was asked to address the United Nations in New York City on population and development, offering her experience and lessons as mayor of Cape Town.

Zille is a supporter of the Campaign for the Establishment of a United Nations Parliamentary Assembly, an organisation which campaigns for democratic reformation of the United Nations; she believes that it is necessary as it will "ensure that the citizens of every country feel more connected to the UN and its programmes".

=== World Mayor award ===
Zille was the winner of the 2008 World Mayor Award in October 2008, out of 820 world mayors nominated. The ruling ANC used its majority in the National Assembly to block a motion by the DA acknowledging Zille's achievement in winning the award.

=== Resignation as Party Leader ===
In April 2015, Zille announced that she would not be standing for re-election as party leader.

== Premier of the Western Cape ==
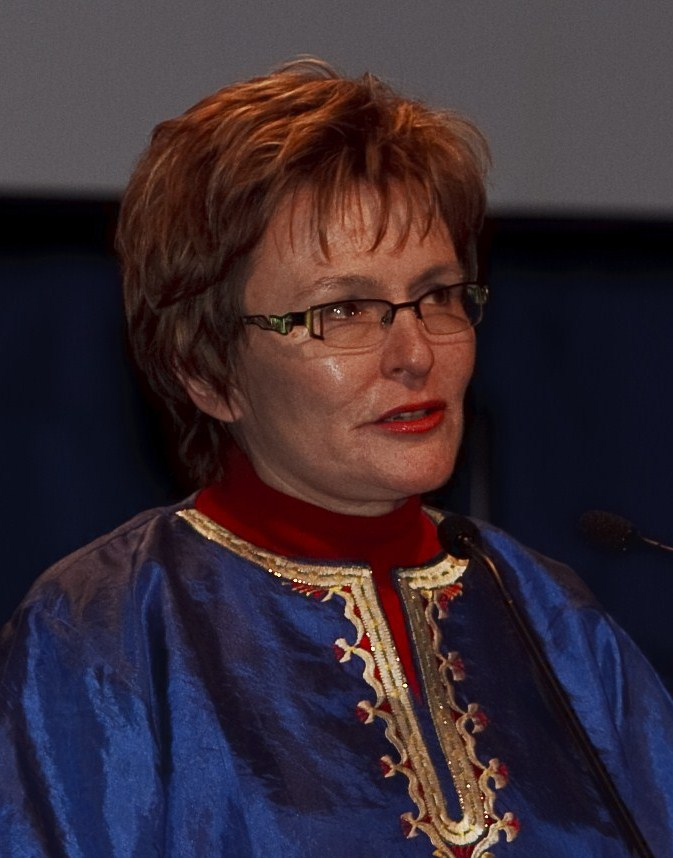
Zille giving a speech in 2010

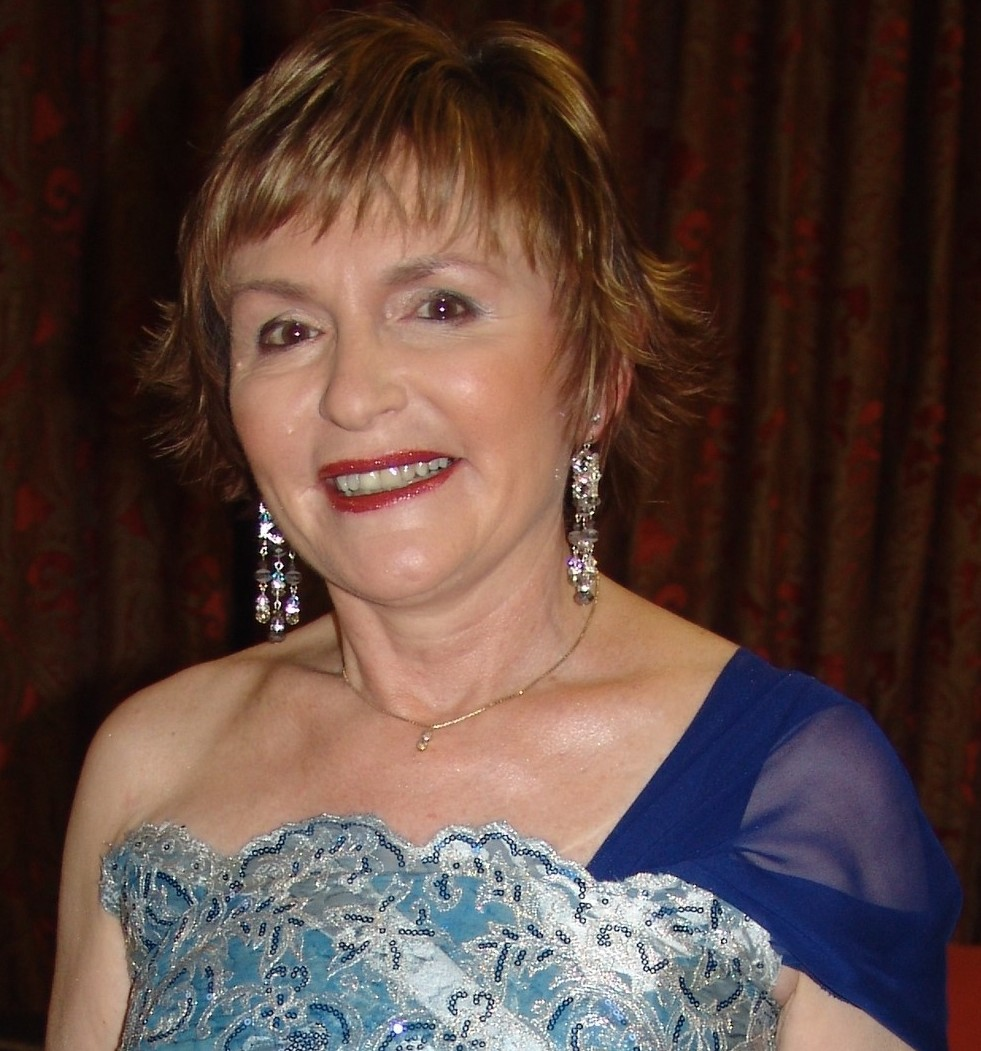
Zille at the 2011 State of the Nation Address

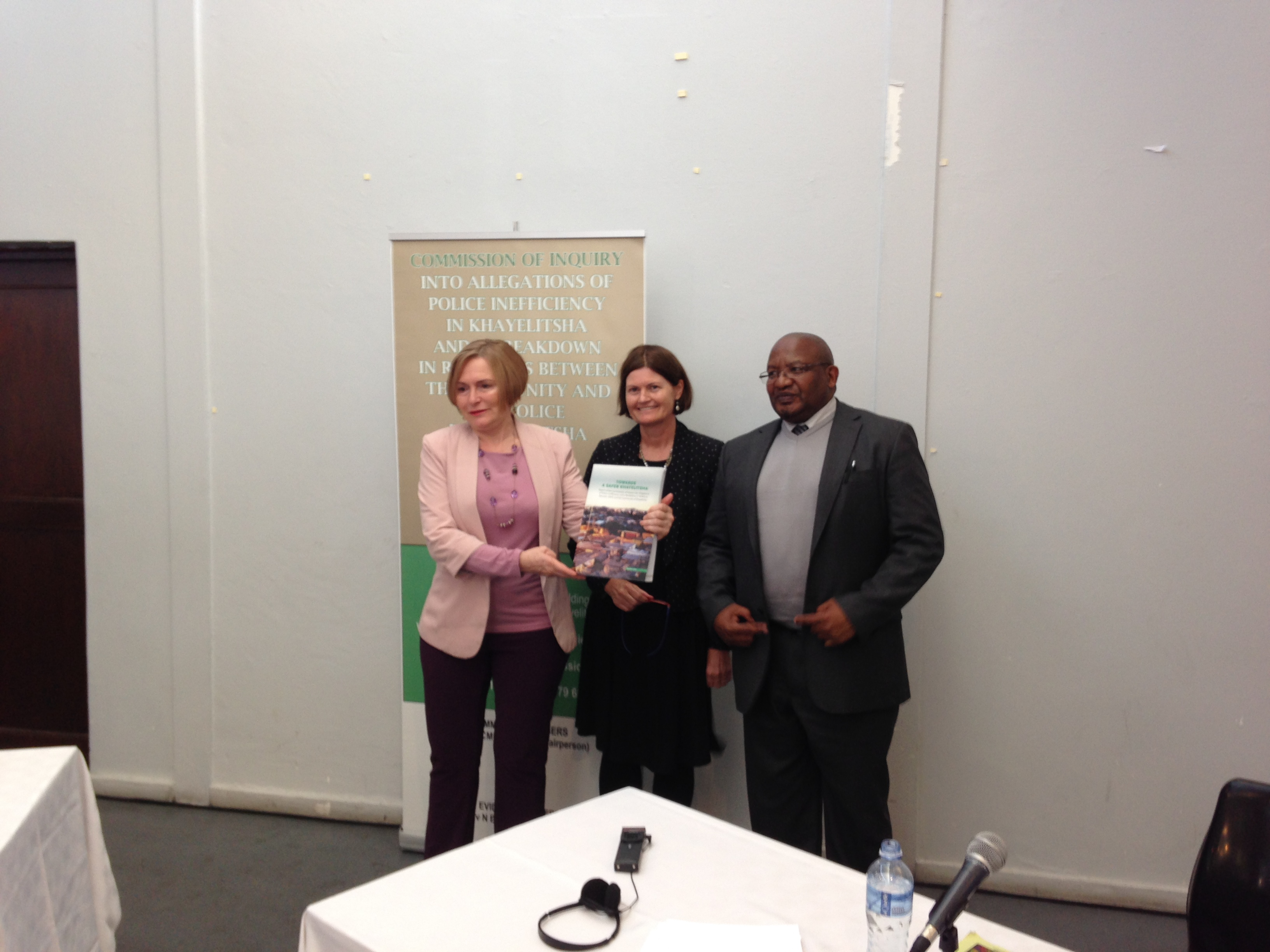
The official handover of the Khayelitsha Commission's findings to the Western Cape Premier Helen Zille

=== 2009 election ===
The 2009 general elections presented Zille with her first major electoral contest as leader of the DA. She was selected as the candidate for Premier of the Western Cape, and her party succeeded in winning a 51.46 percent of the province's vote. Zille was installed as Premier, and replaced as mayor by Dan Plato. Nationally, the DA gained significant ground as official opposition, winning 16.66 percent of the vote, and increasing its tally of seats in both houses of Parliament to 80.

=== Row with Jacob Zuma ===
In May 2009, shortly after being elected Premier, Zille wrote a letter to the Cape Argus newspaper that was accidentally copied by her spokesperson to the Sowetan newspaper. Responding to criticism from gender lobby groups and the ANC over her all-male provincial cabinet, Zille stated in the letter that the ANC had never even been led by a woman, and that its leaders set bad examples on gender issues. She cited South African President Jacob Zuma's "deeply sexist views", accused him of being a "womaniser", and condemned him for putting "all his wives at risk of contracting HIV" by having unprotected sex with an HIV positive woman. Zuma, a polygamist, admitted in his rape trial that he had known that the woman with whom he had had sex was HIV positive.

Zille's condemnation of Zuma's behaviour was then used by the Sowetan as the basis of a front-page story titled "Zuma an AIDS risk". The paper stated that Zille had "launched an extraordinary new attack" on Zuma. This heralded a wave of attacks on Zille from both the ANC and a number of its alliance partners. The ANC Youth League claimed Zille was racist, and that her all-male cabinet consisted of "boyfriends and concubines so that she can continue to sleep around with them". The claim, made without substantiation, drew the ire of the DA, who consulted with their lawyers over a possible defamation suit. The Umkhonto we Sizwe Military Veterans Association restated the Youth League's sex claims, and warned it would launch "a political programme aimed at rendering the Western Cape ungovernable". The ANC also criticised Zille, but distanced itself from the remarks of its Youth League, stating that they were "deeply embarrassing". In response, Zille claimed that the whole row exemplified South Africa's warped approach to gender issues.

=== Land dispute ===
In May 2009, Zille accused the ANC of asset stripping. She related to the transfer of 1 000 hectares of provincial land in the Western Cape to a national body. The transfer was signed off by the former premier Lynne Brown on 21 April 2009, the day before the national elections. Zille alleged that the deal was done "secretly, in bad faith and with an ulterior motive". The ANC responded by claiming that the land deal had been publicly tabled in Parliament several times over the years and there was nothing sinister about it. Zille later said that she would call for a review and rescinding of the agreement and would lodge a dispute at an intergovernmental relations meeting, but the matter was resolved in January 2010, when the ANC's Minister of Human Settlements, Tokyo Sexwale, agreed to return the land to the province before the matter could be taken to court.

=== 2014 elections and re-election ===
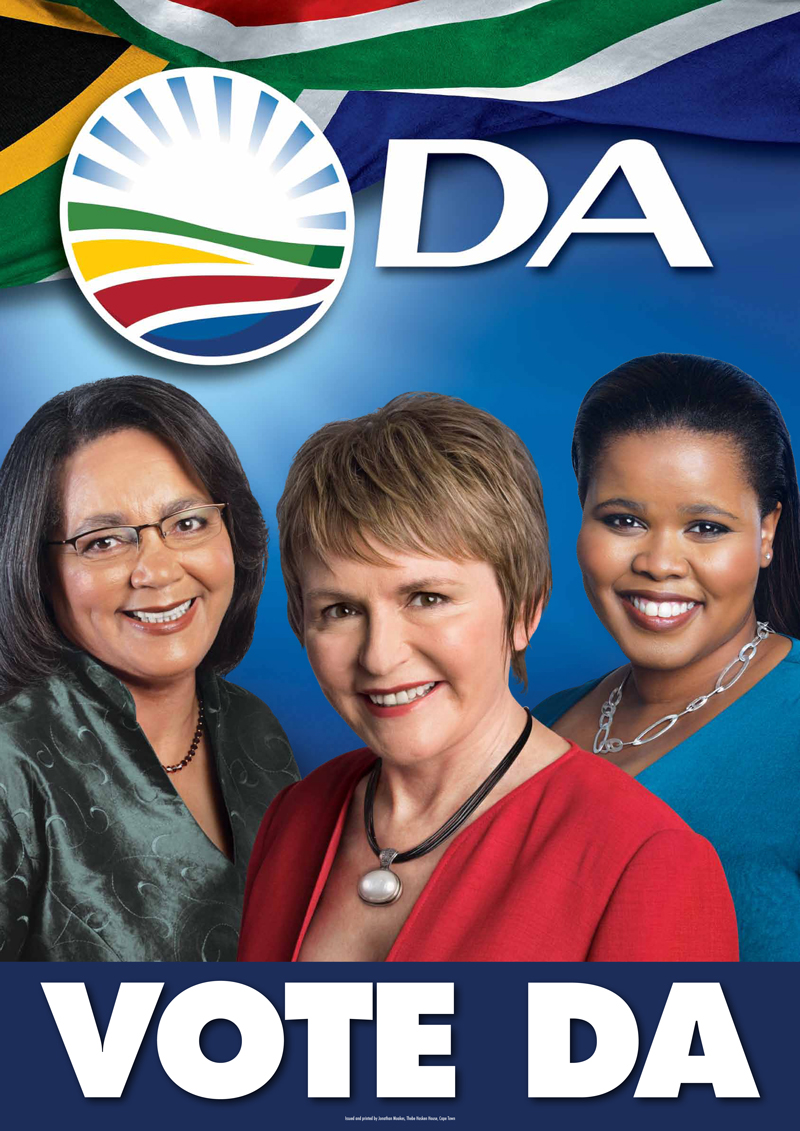
Democratic Alliance election poster with Patricia de Lille, Helen Zille and Lindiwe Mazibuko (2011).

Ahead of the 2014 elections, in 2013, Thembu King Dalindyebo joined the DA as an ordinary member while he was appealing convictions for various crimes, which was seen by some as a cynical ploy by the DA to court voters. When confronted about the membership, Zille noted that no other ordinary members were subject to tests or "due diligence" investigations, but also that the DA's constitution required Dalindyebo's membership to be terminated if his appeals failed. In October 2015, Dalindyebo's convictions were upheld, and his membership of the DA was terminated.

Following the 2014 general elections, the DA won 59.38% of the vote and 26 seats in the Western Cape provincial legislature, an increase of 3.25%. Under her leadership, the party also won 89 seats in the National Assembly and 22.23% of the National vote. Zille was sworn into a second term on 26 May with 27 votes out of 42, her opponent being Marius Fransman of the ANC.

=== Succession as premier ===
In September 2018, the Democratic Alliance announced that it had selected Alan Winde to be the party's Western Cape Premier candidate for the 2019 South African general election. The other candidates nominated for the position were Fazloodien Abrahams, Bonginkosi Madikizela, David Maynier, Kelly Baloyi, Jacobus MacFarlane and Micheal Mack. Zille was constitutionally barred from running for a third term as premier, as the South African constitution prohibits a premier from serving more than two consecutive terms. Following the May 2019 general election, the Democratic Alliance retained its majority in the Western Cape Provincial Parliament. Zille left office on 22 May 2019.

== Later career ==
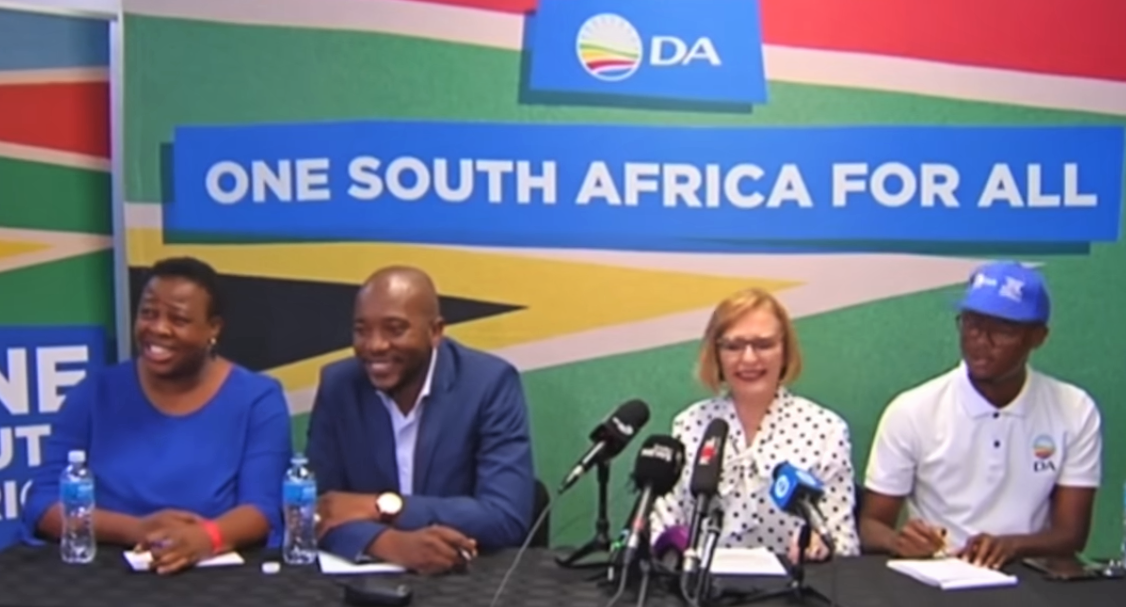
Press conference announcing Helen Zille as the new Federal Council Chairperson

=== Joining the IRR ===
Following her leaving public office in May 2019, it was revealed in July 2019, that she had joined the South African Institute of Race Relations (SAIRR) as a senior policy analyst. The SAIRR said upon the announcement: "The joining of forces between Ms Zille and the IRR brings together two of the loudest reformist voices in the country." The institute soon published a controversial opinion column in September 2019, calling for Maimane to be sacked as DA leader and replaced with Alan Winde. Senior DA officials denounced the opinion piece, though Zille defended it. She soon suspended her IRR fellowship in October 2019.

=== Tea with Helen ===
Zille formed her own podcast, Tea with Helen, in August 2019 intending to engage in conversation with people who disagree with her political views. The podcast is aired on YouTube, iTunes and Spotify. The first guest on the show was Business Day's former editor-in-chief, Peter Bruce. Other people who have featured on the podcast include Ferial Haffajee, Max du Preez and Adam Habib. Zille tried to reach out to EFF leader, Julius Malema, but he rejected the invitation.

=== Federal Council Chairperson ===
Zille was elected as Federal Council Chairperson of the DA in October 2019 after the retirement of incumbent James Selfe. The position is similar to a Secretary-General role in the party's leadership structure. Zille announced her candidacy for the position after she described the party as being in "distress and political turmoil" following the first period of electoral decline in the party's history. She was re-elected to the position in April 2023.

=== 2026 Johannesburg Mayoral Race ===
In early June 2025, Zille announced that she was seriously considering a run for the position of Mayor of Johannesburg. She said she would make her decision public before the 15 June 2025 candidate application deadline.

The Democratic Alliance (DA), of which Zille is Federal Council Chairperson, has held the Joburg mayoral post twice; most recently in January 2023, after Mpho Phalatse had held the post for a cumulative period of around a year. Several DA councilors plan to contest the party primary.

Zille has expressed her dissatisfaction with how the City of Johannesburg has been run in recent years, and has said it would take more than 5 years to turn the city around. She noted that Johannesburg has an infrastructure backlog of R200 billion, and an annual budget of R86 billion. She also said the city's workforce had grown by 86% since 2010. She claims she is capable of the task and will be an effective Mayor of Johannesburg due in part to her experience gained through her role as Mayor of Cape Town, turning that city around when urban blight was settling in around 2006, as well as experience gained in her role as Premier of the Western Cape province. The Auditor General of South Africa ranked Cape Town the best-run large city in the country for 3 consecutive years, as of 2025., though critics argue that the city's governance primarily focuses on the white elite, while neglecting black citizens.

Zille stated that, as Mayor, she would initially focus on stabilizing Joburg's finances and restoring service delivery, and that the skills of the Johannesburg City Council, and appointing the correct people to key roles, would be fundamental to Joburg's improvement.

She further said that fixing Johannesburg would take a whole-of-society approach, and that civil society is a crucial partner in this process. Her hope is that residents of the city remain there to help fix it, and that those who have moved abroad will return to do the same.

== Controversies ==
=== Allegations of racism ===
In May 2019, Zille was asked to apologise for comments in which she said that "black privilege" meant looting and being re-elected. Zille tweeted: "Amazing. People can run around all day making the most outrageous racial generalisations about a tiny minority in this country by stigmatising 'whiteness', and the sky falls in when you give them a taste of their own medicine. I am not doing double standards any more." Zille went further, stating she was "embarrassed at South Africans' generalisations about 'whiteness'". She added that "whiteness" was a swear word used to stigmatise and marginalise.

Zille was criticised for calling the singer Simphiwe Dana a "professional black".

=== 2008 xenophobia comments ===
The DA and then mayor Helen Zille drew criticism for their response to the 2008 xenophobic attacks in Cape Town. In particular, Finance Minister Trevor Manuel accused Zille of "fanning the flames", by speaking out against foreign drug dealers while on a visit to Mitchell's Plain. Zille responded that she had been completely misquoted, and challenged Manuel to read newspaper transcripts of her speech. Zille has also accused the ANC government of creating a dependency culture lacking of economic development that has fuelled xenophobia.

=== Criminalisation of deliberately spreading HIV with multiple partners ===
While addressing a wellness summit hosted by the Western Cape Health department, Zille had called for men who knew they were HIV positive, yet refused to use condoms and had multiple sexual partners, to be charged with attempted murder, and for a shift in focus from the treatment of preventable diseases to unpreventable diseases. Some AIDS activists warned against such a move and called Zille's remarks "careless and misleading." Among those who criticized Zille's position were the Constitutional Law scholar Pierre de Vos and prominent AIDS activist and director of Section 27, Mark Heywood.

=== Refugees from Eastern Cape ===
In 2012, Zille was embroiled in controversy after she tweeted: "While E Cape education collapsed, WC built 30 schools – 22 new, 8 replacement mainly 4 E Cape edu refugees. 26 MORE new schools coming".

Her statement followed on from a protest in Grabouw about overcrowding at a local school. The ANC called Zille's reference to "refugees", with regard to Eastern Cape pupils who flocked to the Western Cape for a better education, "inhumane".

Zille later apologized and said she was "very, very sorry about the impact of those words". She was "sorry because it was never meant in that context at all, and it was never said in that way at all. She said "What I was trying to show up was what (Basic) Education Minister Angie Motshekga calls a 'horror story' of education in much of the Eastern Cape".

=== Failed merger with Agang ===
As DA Party Leader, Zille presided over a failed attempt to merge with opposition party Agang, then led by Mamphela Ramphele. After announcing the merger, and Zille famously kissing Ramphele at the news conference, the merger fell apart after five days when the DA could not come to an agreement on the way forward with Ramphele: she wanted to remain the leader of Agang while also running for the presidency of the DA, but Zille told her this would not be legal. The ANC suggested that foreign parties were funding the merger.

=== Colonialism controversy arising from a trip to Singapore and Japan ===
In March 2017, after a trip to Singapore and Japan which cost R600,000 for five people, Zille commented on Twitter, “For those claiming legacy of colonialism was ONLY negative, think of our independent judiciary, transport infrastructure, piped water etc.” The consequent outrage led to internal disciplinary hearings. Zille was also investigated for her comments about the legacy of colonialism by the Human Rights Commission for "a potential violation of human dignity".

==== Criticism and disciplinary hearing ====
Following accusations that she was defending colonialism, Zille noted that her views had been misconstrued, but also apologised "unreservedly for a tweet that may have come across as a defence of colonialism. It was not."

Among those who disagreed with her were other DA members, such as Mbali Ntuli, who stated that colonialism was "only" negative, and who herself faced a disciplinary hearing in 2017 for "liking" in December 2016 a Facebook comment that characterised Zille as racist; Phumzile van Damme, who stated that there was not "a single aspect of [colonialism] that can be said to be positive or beneficial to Africans"; and party leader Mmusi Maimane, who stated "Colonialism‚ like Apartheid‚ was a system of oppression and subjugation. It can never be justified," but also said in the aftermath that Zille was not a racist and that she had "consistently fought oppression". DA MP Ghaleb Cachalia defended Zille as well-intentioned. He agreed with her that colonialism was not solely negative, and noted that many prominent intellectuals, including Chinua Achebe, Ali Mazrui, Godfrey Mwakikagile and Manmohan Singh, have expressed similar sentiments.

The ANC and Economic Freedom Fighters both demanded that Zille be removed from her position as Western Cape Premier.

As a result of her online comments, Zille was referred to the DA's Federal Legal Commission for a disciplinary hearing on charges of bringing the party into disrepute and damaging the party's image. Following this news, Zille further defended herself by noting that Nelson Mandela had held the same opinion about colonialism. Her continued defence of her comments exacerbated internal friction in the Democratic Alliance between her and her detractors, and was seen to undermine the party leader, Maimane. Maimane stated that the disciplinary charges against Zille were not limited to Twitter, and included "a series of comments [...] that have exacerbated and amplified the original tweet". Some of her subsequent writings, in which she defended her views, further strained her relationship with Maimane.

==== Costs ====
In April 2017, Zille faced criticism from the ANC about her visit to Asia, in her capacity as Premier of the Western Cape, which the ANC characterised as extravagant at a price of R1 million. However, according to Zille's spokesperson, the cost included the price of a full delegation, and included visits to Singapore, Japan, Thailand and Vietnam. R636,000 was travel expenses, and another R500,000 was for "direct business engagements". Also according to the spokesperson, the trip was intended to strengthen Asian investment in halal food, and to encourage tourism to the Western Cape from that region. Zille defended herself by stating that she had gone without an assistant in order to limit the expense of the trip. No finding of wrongdoing was ever made against Zille as a result of these travel expenses.

=== Apartheid tweets ===
In late-June 2020, Zille commented on Twitter that "There are more racist laws today than there were under apartheid". She also tweeted that had not former President F.W. de Klerk "decided to dismantle apartheid", the ANC "would still be bogged down in the mess of its so-called liberation camps and infighting" because the ANC "had no viable armed struggle to speak of.” John Steenhuisen, the interim leader of the DA at the time, distanced himself from Zille's views, and the Federal Legal Commission of the party launched an investigation into her comments.

Dr Duncan Du Bois, a historian and political analyst, supported Helen Zille's assertion. He pointed out that, based on research by James Myburgh, the Apartheid government passed 59 pieces of race-based legislation over a period of 70 years, whereas the post-Apartheid government has passed 90 laws with racial representativity mandates over a period of 25 years. Political analyst James Myburgh considered Helen Zille's comments "hyperbolic" but "not (far) wrong". Myburgh's analysis, however, included post-Apartheid laws mandating racial representation on the boards of individual statutory bodies, but did not include Apartheid-era laws specific to the Bantustans.

=== Allegations of nepotism ===
While Zille was Premier, MPL Cameron Dugmore accused her of nepotism, alleging that she had used her influence as Premier to put pressure on the Education Department to provide her son, Paul Maree, with state procured equipment to test his software products. Dugmore alleged that tablets were provided to her son, who was in the process of developing his private business, and that other businesses were prejudiced in the process. Dugmore referred the matter to the Public Protector's office for investigation and requested the Western Cape Legislature investigate the Premier for Breach of Ethics.

Public Protector, Busisiwe Mkhwebane, found against the Premier, despite the fact that Zille's son had provided the services for free and documentary evidence confirms that Zille had made the software available to any organisation who wanted to assist learners in the same way. Then Minister of Basic Education, Angie Motshekga of the ANC came to Zille's defence, saying that there was no conflict of interest. Mkhwebane would subsequently become the first head of a Chapter 9 institution to be impeached, partly for the "exceeding of the bounds of her powers in terms of the Constitution and the Public Protector Act as well as repeated errors of the same kind, such as incorrect interpretation of the law." Mkhwebane would go on to join opposition political parties, the Economic Freedom Fighters, and later the Umkhonto Wesizwe Party.

=== South Africa's position on Israel ===
Zille has been an outspoken critic of South Africa's stance on the Israeli–Palestinian conflict. In 2024, she suggested that the South African government's position on Israel might be influenced by Iranian funding to the African National Congress (ANC), a claim denied by ANC officials. In September 2025, while discussing the Hamas-led attack on Israel on 7 October 2023 and the subsequent war between Israel and Hamas, she said that Hamas had "spent all its energy trying to obliterate the state of Israel."

== Personal life ==
Zille married Professor Johann Maree in 1982, and they have two sons. She is a member of the Rondebosch United Church in Cape Town.

== Published works ==
- Zille, Helen (October 2016). Not Without a Fight. Penguin Books. ISBN 9781776090426
- Zille, Helen (April 2021). #StayWoke: Go Broke: Why South Africa won’t survive America’s culture wars (and what you can do about it). Independently Published. ISBN 9798727953457

Political offices
Preceded by Nomaindia Mfeketo	Mayor of Cape Town; 2006–2009	Succeeded by Dan Plato
Preceded by Lynne Brown	Premier of the Western Cape; 2009–2019	Succeeded by Alan Winde
Party political offices
Preceded by Tony Leon	Leader of the Democratic Alliance; 2007–2015	Succeeded by Mmusi Maimane
