= Phumzile Van Damme =

South African activist and politician (born 1983)

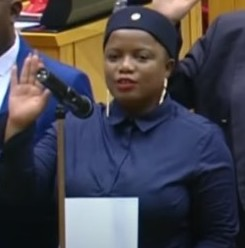
- Van Damme in Parliament in May 2019

Member of the National Assembly
- In office 21 May 2014 – 20 May 2021

Shadow Minister of Communications
- In office 3 October 2015 – 5 December 2020
- Deputy: Veronica van Dyk; Cameron Mackenzie
- Leader: Mmusi Maimane
- Preceded by: Gavin Davis
- Succeeded by: Zakhele Mbhele

National Spokesperson of the Democratic Alliance
- In office 30 May 2014 – 14 February 2018 Serving with Marius Redelinghuys and Refiloe Nt'sekhe
- Leader: Mmusi Maimane
- Preceded by: Mmusi Maimane
- Succeeded by: Solly Malatsi

Personal details
- Born: 20 July 1983 (age 43) Manzini, Swaziland
- Citizenship: South African
- Party: Democratic Alliance (until June 2021)
- Spouse: Stian Tvede Karlsen (m. 2017)
- Relations: Qiniso Van Damme (sister)
- Parent: Sibongile Masuku (mother)
- Education: Rhodes University

Phumzile Thelma Van Damme (born 20 July 1983) is a South African tech consultant and activist who specialises in combating political disinformation and misinformation. A former politician, she represented the Democratic Alliance (DA) in the National Assembly of South Africa between May 2014 and May 2021. She was the party's Shadow Minister of Communications from October 2015 to December 2020.

Van Damme began her career as a political staffer for the DA and joined the National Assembly in the May 2014 general election. In addition to serving as Shadow Minister of Communications, she was the DA's national spokesperson between May 2014 and February 2018 and a party whip between May 2019 and May 2021. In the communications portfolio, she was a prominent figure in the campaign to hold Bell Pottinger accountable for its white monopoly capital disinformation campaign, and she pioneered the South African Parliament's first efforts to engage international tech giants on their digital privacy and content moderation policies.

Regarded as a member of a social liberal grouping in the DA, Van Damme was sacked from the shadow cabinet in December 2020 after John Steenhuisen took office as the party's leader. Her poor relationship with Steenhuisen and his chief whip, Natasha Mazzone, led her to resign from her parliamentary seat in May 2021. She terminated her party membership a month later.

Since leaving frontline politics, Van Damme has been a freelance consultant on strategy and communications matters relating to disinformation and misinformation, platform accountability and tech regulation, digital rights, and gender-based cyber-harassment. In South Africa she remains a popular political commentator on Twitter.

== Early life and education ==
Van Damme was born on 20 July 1983 in Manzini, Swaziland (present-day Eswatini) to Elroy Mayisela and Lynette Sibongile Masuku. Her father was a high school teacher and her mother, later an academic and conservationist, was a teaching student at the University of Swaziland at the time of Van Damme's birth. She is of mixed Swati, Zulu, and Xhosa heritage. Until 2014, Van Damme believed that she was born in Nelspruit, South Africa, an error that was reproduced on her birth certificate and in various professional biographical materials; the error was uncovered by members of the press, creating a public scandal.

Van Damme's biological parents separated during her childhood and she changed her surname after she was legally adopted by her stepfather, a Belgian consultant named Hugo Van Damme. Having begun primary school in Manzini, she moved with her mother to Europe and then, after her mother divorced her stepfather, to South Africa.

In 2007 Van Damme graduated from Rhodes University in Grahamstown, South Africa with a bachelor's degree in law and politics. The following year, she was recruited to the Democratic Alliance (DA) Young Leaders Programme, the party's selective leadership development and mentorship programme. Formerly a supporter of the African National Congress (ANC), she had joined the DA both because she was "disgruntled" with the ANC and because she was attracted to the DA's liberal policy positions.

== Democratic Alliance staffer: 2009–2014 ==
In the months after the April 2009 general election, Van Damme joined the DA full-time as a political staffer. Over the next five years she held various research and media positions in the party. She was assigned to the office of DA spokesperson Lindiwe Mazibuko and briefly to the office of Mazibuko's successor, Mmusi Maimane; thereafter she moved to the DA-led Western Cape Provincial Government as the spokesperson to the Provincial Minister of Economic Development and Tourism, Alan Winde.

From 2013 to 2014, Van Damme worked in the DA's parliamentary caucus as its head of research and communications. During this period she was also the chairperson of the DA's branch in the Cape Town City Bowl. For her leadership of the DA's "well-oiled communications machine", she was named as one of the Mail & Guardian's 200 Young South Africans in June 2013. She applied to become a DA parliamentary candidate in 2013 and was selected in January 2014.

== National Assembly of South Africa: 2014–2021 ==
In the May 2014 general election, ranked 19th on the DA's national party list, Van Damme was elected to a seat in the National Assembly, the lower house of the Parliament of South Africa. Aged 31, she was one of the youngest members of the house. On 30 May 2014, she additionally became one of the DA's two national spokespersons: in anticipation of an increased workload, she and Marius Redelinghuys were jointly appointed to replace Mmusi Maimane, who had been elected as Leader of the Opposition. After Redelinghuys resigned in 2015, she held the position alongside Refiloe Nt'sekhe.

During her first year as a parliamentarian Van Damme was viewed as a "rising star" in the DA, and Forbes Magazine named her one of its 20 Youngest Power Women in Africa in December 2014. Strongly self-identified as a liberal and as a proponent of "the agency of individuals" and "minimal government interference in people's lives", she was regarded as a leading member of the social liberal camp in the DA, which at the time was ascendant under Maimane's leadership.

=== Citizenship scandal ===
Shortly after her ascension to Parliament, Van Damme was the target of a "birtherist" scandal about her South African citizenship, inaugurated by a Sunday Times article published on 29 June 2014 under the headline "DA MP a liar and fraud". Journalists Piet Rampedi, Mzilikazi wa Afrika, and Stephan Hofstatter reported that Van Damme's South African birth certificate and professional biography falsely claimed that Van Damme was born in South Africa, when in fact she was born in Swaziland. They also alleged that both of her biological parents were Swazi nationals – her mother being of South African descent but born in Hlathikhulu, Swaziland – meaning that Van Damme was not entitled to South African citizenship and therefore was not entitled to serve in Parliament. The report described Van Damme as "a foreign national with a fraudulently acquired South African identity document".

The ANC called for an "urgent investigation" into Van Damme's eligibility to serve in Parliament. One party spokesperson, Zizi Kodwa, suggested that the DA should "apologise to the people of South Africa for misleading and lying to them" and another, Moloto Mothapo, suggested that Van Damme's election showed that "in its window-dressing exercise of desperately recruiting and parading black people to conceal its real identity, the DA has cut corners".

In a statement, the DA said that Van Damme had accepted her mother's account of her birth until the Sunday Times made its inquiries, after which she had discovered through a personal investigation that her mother had misstated her birthplace when registering her birth at the South African Department of Home Affairs in Pietermaritzburg in the mid-1990s. In subsequent reporting, the Sunday Times challenged this account, claiming that Van Damme and her mother had previously been alerted to and warned against the misrepresentation. Nonetheless, the DA said that although Van Damme was not a South African citizen by birth, she was entitled to citizenship by descent through her biological father and grandparents. The party also said that it would challenge the Sunday Times's reporting at the Press Ombudsman, calling it libelous.

The DA's statement linked Van Damme's mother's error to the political context of Van Damme's birth, pointing out that Van Damme's grandmother, a South African, had emigrated to Swaziland in the 1950s to escape apartheid, and that her mother had received bad advice from a Home Affairs official when registering her birth in South Africa during the frenetic post-apartheid transition. On Heritage Day in September 2014, Van Damme gave a speech to Parliament about her own mixed national heritage, saying that, like other South Africans affected by apartheid, she had "recently had the misfortune of being made to feel alien in the country I call home."

=== Shadow Minister of Communications ===
On 3 October 2015, in a reshuffle of his shadow cabinet, Maimane appointed van Damme to replace Gavin Davis as Shadow Minister of Communications, with Veronica van Dyk as her deputy. She held that position for the next five years. For the first two-and-a-half years, she held the shadow ministry alongside her position as DA spokesperson and indeed was noted for receiving a high-profile mandate as spokesperson. However, in February 2018, she announced her resignation as spokesperson, saying that she would focus on her work in the shadow cabinet, her family life, and her part-time pursuit of a master's degree by correspondence; she enrolled in a master's in global diplomacy at the School of Oriental Studies in London. Solly Malatsi replaced her as DA spokesperson in June.

Van Damme was also a prominent figure in the DA's campaign in the 2019 general election, named by Maimane as the party's lead anti-corruption campaigner. Re-elected to her parliamentary seat in the election, she was also re-appointed as Shadow Minister of Communications in Maimane's second-term shadow cabinet, now with the title of Shadow Minister of Communications and Digital Technologies and with Cameron Mackenzie as her deputy shadow minister. In addition, in May 2019, the first DA caucus meeting of the Sixth Parliament elected Van Damme as one of the DA's 12 whips in the National Assembly. Shortly afterwards, Van Damme was one of 20 women named by Vital Voices as a VV Engage Fellow, in which capacity she participated in a year-long, part-time leadership development programme.

==== SABC inquiry ====
As Shadow Minister of Communications, Van Damme was the DA's ranking member in the Portfolio Committee on Communications during Jacob Zuma's presidential administration, and in that capacity she was an outspoken opponent of corruption in communications agencies. News24's Jan Gerber said that she "always came to [committee] meetings armed with a string of pertinent questions", though she was often outvoted or dismissed by the rest of the committee. In 2016, she called for a parliamentary inquiry into corruption and maladministration at the South African Broadcasting Corporation (SABC), and later that year she supported ANC politician Jackson Mthembu's call for a narrower inquiry into the SABC board's fitness to hold office. She went on to represent the DA on the ad hoc parliamentary committee that was established in November 2016 to conduct the narrower inquiry, and she proposed that the inquiry should summon Faith Muthambi, the incumbent Minister of Communications, for questioning.

When the inquiry concluded its hearings in January 2017, Van Damme said that the DA would recommend a forensic audit of SABC's finances since 2010, as well as disciplinary charges against SABC executives and board members. The final report of the inquiry found prima facie evidence of misconduct by Minister Muthambi, and those allegations were referred to the parliamentary ethics committee and the president for further investigation; however, the DA was outvoted on its recommendations for more stringent action, including on its proposal that Muthambi's conduct should be referred to the Public Protector. Under Van Damme, the DA continued to pursue accountability against Muthambi in later years, including through a complaint to the Public Service Commission about alleged nepotism and a criminal complaint to the police about alleged editorial interference at the SABC.

==== Bell Pottinger ====
In the autumn of 2017, the South African press broke the story of an apparent fake news campaign coordinated by British public relations firm Bell Pottinger and calculated to inflame racial tensions in order to deflect from allegations that the Gupta family had captured the Zuma administration. Van Damme was a prominent figure in the civil society backlash against Bell Pottinger, leading British PRWeek to label her "Bell Pottinger's critic-in-chief".

In the immediate aftermath of the initial news reports, the DA laid complaints against the firm with the United Kingdom's Public Relations and Communications Association (PRCA) and the Chartered Institute of Public Relations. In August 2017, Van Damme travelled to London, England to present evidence against Bell Pottinger during an PRCA hearing into the firm's conduct. Bell Pottinger was found to have transgressed the PRCA's charter and code of conduct, and it was expelled from the body the following month.

Through her role in the campaign against Bell Pottinger, Van Damme acquired a reputation as an authority on political disinformation and was invited to speak on the subject on international platforms. She was featured in Influence, Diana Neille and Richard Poplak's documentary about the saga, which premiered in January 2020 at the Sundance Film Festival. She also became a member of the International Grand Committee on Disinformation.

=== Demotion and sabbatical ===
On 5 December 2020, Van Damme was sacked as Shadow Minister of Communications by John Steenhuisen, who had recently replaced Maimane as DA federal leader. Steenhuisen appointed Zakhele Mbhele to replace Van Damme in his new shadow cabinet. The evening before the shadow cabinet announcement, Van Damme had complained on Twitter that Steenhuisen had granted her unsolicited medical leave, labelled a "sabbatical". At the time she was on three months' medical leave to treat her functional neurologic disorder; the leave was scheduled to end on 15 December 2020, but Steenhuisen, expressing concern about Van Damme's multiple chronic illnesses, suggested that the leave should be extended until the end of March 2021. Van Damme argued that she was able to outperform many of her colleagues even while ill and accused Steenhuisen of using her illness to "sideline" her. She later said that Steenhuisen was "trying to control my life [and] body".

In the aftermath of the dual sabbatical and shadow cabinet reshuffle announcements, observers speculated that Steenhuisen had extended the health-related sabbatical to create political cover for his decision to remove a high-performing minister who presented a political threat to him. Van Damme had not supported Steenhuisen's candidacy for the DA leadership, but instead had endorsed his opponent, Mbali Ntuli. The Daily Maverick also reported that there was personal animosity between Steenhuisen and Van Damme; several sources pointed the newspaper to a hot mic incident during a Zoom meeting earlier in 2020, when Van Damme had accidentally been captured saying of Steenhuisen, "I don't want to hear his smarmy voice."

The DA's chief whip, Natasha Mazzone, said that the sabbatical had been extended out of concern for Van Damme, rather than for political reasons, and that it was extended as an optional offer rather than as an instruction. After Steenhuisen repeated similar claims in a televised eNCA interview with JJ Tabane, Van Damme published a series of further angry Tweets about Steenhuisen's "fibs", saying that in a telephone conversation Steenhuisen had insisted that she should take the sabbatical and cease all of her parliamentary duties during that time. She said that she would abide by Steenhuisen's instruction to take a sabbatical, but that she and the DA "will talk through my lawyers in 2021".

On 12 February 2021, Van Damme announced that had returned to parliamentary work, having resolved her disagreement with Steenhuisen over her sabbatical. She said that she would focus on the digital technologies side of the communications portfolio. She was the DA's alternate member in the Portfolio Committee on Communications and Digital Technologies, and she also continued to serve as a party whip.

=== Facebook meeting ===
The same week that she announced her return to work, Van Damme attended the communications committee's first meeting of the year, at which she lodged a proposal for the committee to summon Facebook for a meeting about the company's policies on digital privacy, misinformation, and content moderation. She expressed particular concern about misinformation related to the ongoing COVID-19 pandemic and to the upcoming South African local government elections. The portfolio committee agreed to extend an invitation to Facebook, and two months later Van Damme announced that Facebook had agreed to attend the committee on 25 May 2021. Van Damme said that the meeting with Facebook would be "historic and a source of pride for South Africa as a first in Africa", and she said that similar invitations had been extended to Twitter and Google.

However, less than a week before the scheduled meeting date, Facebook withdrew from the engagement. Van Damme expressed her dismay, saying that, "It is clear that the company has something to hide and holds no respect for the people of South Africa, or those on the Africa continent". In its own statement, Facebook said that it had been invited to participate in an industry roundtable and had postponed the meeting only after it learned that it was the only company to have confirmed its attendance. Van Damme responded that this was a "blatant untruth", since Google had also been scheduled to attend; she accused Facebook of withdrawing because "it feared having to answer tough questions" about its updated WhatsApp privacy policy, which had been widely criticised, including by the South African Information Regulator. Later in 2021 Van Damme was appointed to the Real Facebook Oversight Board.

=== Resignation ===
On 20 May 2021, Van Damme resigned from her parliamentary seat, citing her unhappiness with a "clique of individuals" in the DA. Nicholas Myburgh filled her seat in the National Assembly.

In the months after her resignation, Van Damme explained that she had resigned because of internal disputes with a group of DA politicians led by party leader Steenhuisen, party whip Mazzone, and Mazzone's husband, Kevin Mileham. In a series of Tweets, she said that the precipitating event for her resignation had been Mazzone's instruction to her to "lay off Facebook" in her campaign against misinformation. She also accused Steenhuisen of turning the DA into a "joke" and of persistent attempts to "get rid of me", including through the 2020 sabbatical and 2021 disciplinary hearing. In 2023 she included Steenhuisen on her public list of South Africa's "most awful" contemporary politicians.

== Tech activism and consultancy: 2021–present ==
Upon leaving Parliament, Van Damme entered the private sector as an independent consultant specialising in misinformation. She initially retained her membership in the DA, but on 26 June 2021 she announced that she had left the party. She said that she was planning to launch an anti-misinformation project ahead of the November local government elections and that the project required her to be non-partisan. In September 2021, she launched the Local Government Anti-Disinformation Project, the aim of which was advocacy and monitoring in relation to political misinformation and disinformation on social media. The project was a collaboration between Van Damme, who was its coordinator, and five other civil society partners including Right2Know and Code for Africa.

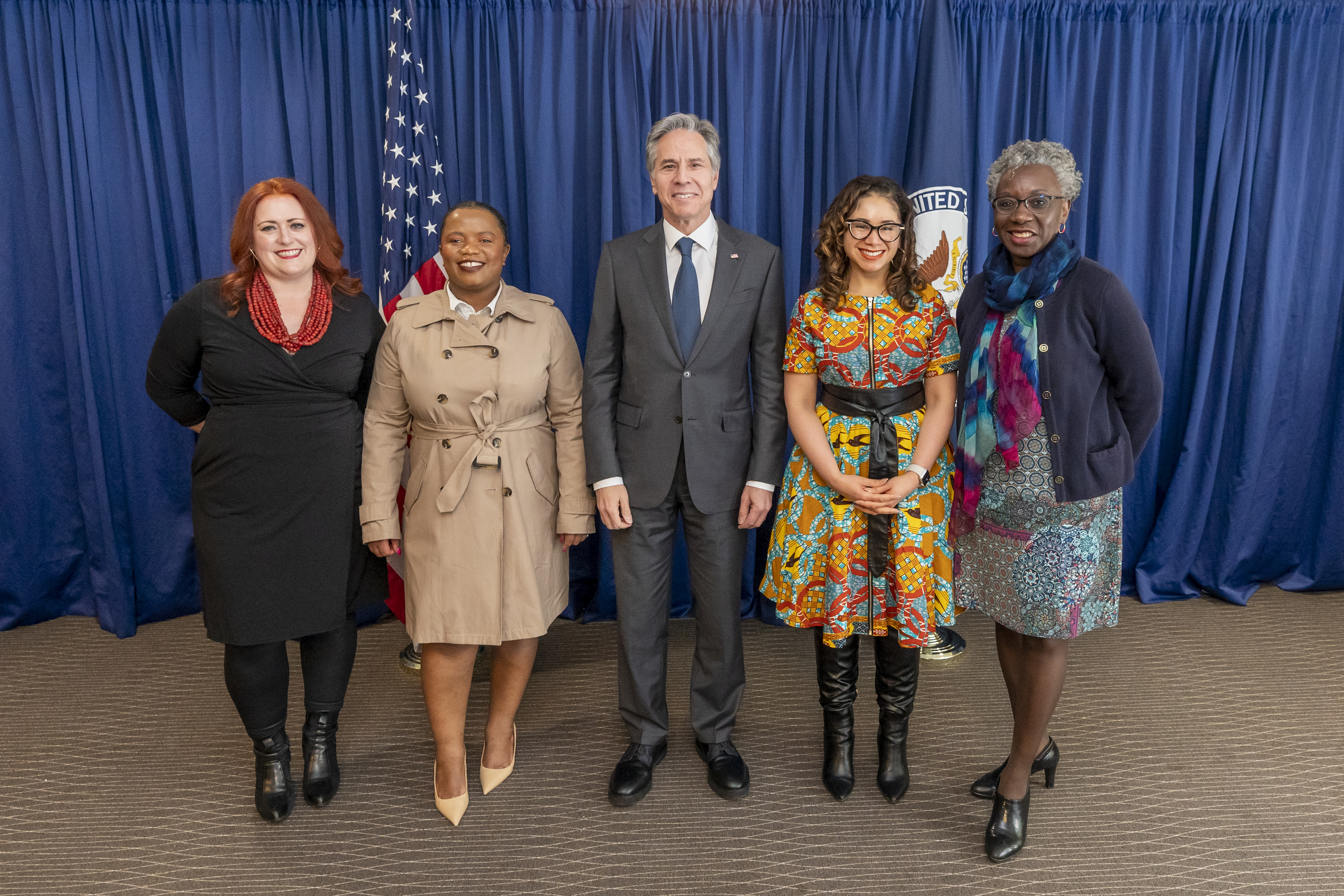
Van Damme (second from left) with American Secretary of State Antony Blinken, Desirée Cormier Smith, and others at the Summit for Democracy in Washington, D.C. in March 2023

Later in September 2021, Van Damme was named as one of 25 participants in the 2021/2022 Munich Young Leaders Program, a joint initiative of the Munich Security Conference and the Körber-Stiftung. In later years, for her tech activism and especially her activism on platform accountability, Van Damme received the 2022 Vital Voices Global Leadership Award and was named as one of "100 Brilliant Women in AI Ethics" in 2023. From 2023 to 2024, she was a technology and human rights fellow at the Harvard Kennedy School's Carr Center for Human Rights Policy.

In addition to broader tech governance policy, Van Damme has a special interest in combatting online harassment of women. She is a member of the advisory councils of #ShePersisted and the Global Partnership for Action on Gender-Based Online Harassment and Abuse, and she spoke on the subject at the 2023 Summit for Democracy.

== Personal life ==
In 2017 Van Damme married Stian Tvede Karlsen, a Norwegian public relations professional, in a traditional wedding ceremony. Her sister is Qiniso Van Damme, a model and actress who became South Africa's first Bachelorette.

In June 2019, Van Damme was involved in an altercation with members of the public at the V&A Waterfront in Cape Town. In her account, the altercation began when she quarrelled with a white woman in a supermarket queue and escalated when one of the woman's male relatives intervened. She said that she punched the man in self-defence after he approached her, threw her phone on the ground, and told her to "voetsek you black". After a complaint by Van Damme, the V&A Waterfront publicly apologised for the manner in which its security manager had responded to the incident, saying that it lacked empathy and objectivity.

Party political offices
Preceded by Mmusi Maimane	National Spokesperson of the Democratic Alliance; 2014–2018	Succeeded by Solly Malatsi
