= Marian Shinn =

South African politician

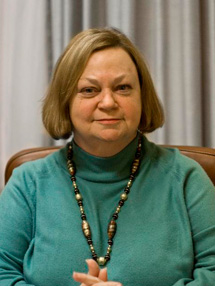

Shadow Minister of Telecommunications and Postal Services
- In office 2014–2019
- Leader: Mmusi Maimane

Shadow Minister of Communications
- In office 2012–2014
- Preceded by: Natasha Michael
- Succeeded by: Gavin Davis

Personal details
- Born: Zimbabwe
- Party: Democratic Alliance

Marian Shinn is a South African politician, a former Member of Parliament with the Democratic Alliance (DA), and the former Shadow Minister of Telecommunications and Postal Services.

== Early life and journalism career ==
Shinn was born and educated in Zimbabwe.

She moved to South Africa in 1971 to join the Rand Daily Mail which started her journalism career. She continued at The Star in 1974 where Shinn focused on human rights and social welfare issues. She was on the team that reported from Alexandra, north of Johannesburg, during the June 1976 student uprising.

During her journalism career, she also worked for the Sunday Tribune, Sunday Times and Sunday Express, before venturing into information technology (IT) trade journalism.

In 1984, Shinn won the first IT Journalism of the Year award for editing South Africa's first magazine aimed at business users of IT and the following year, she started a public relations consultancy specializing in IT.

== Political career ==
Marian was active in the Five Freedoms Forum which promoted dialogue between white and black South Africans, and in 1989 she was part of the forum's delegation that visited the African National Congress in Lusaka.

On moving to Cape Town in 1998, Shinn joined the Muizenberg branch of the Democratic Party and served as the branch chairperson

== Other interests and hobbies ==
Shinn is also a writer; in 2002, her feature film script was selected as a finalist at the Moondance Film Festival held in Boulder, Colorado.

== Political life ==
Shinn served as the DA Shadow Minister of Telecommunications and Postal Services.

Shinn retired from politics at the 2019 general election.
