= Siviwe Gwarube =

South African politician (born 1989)

The Honourable Siviwe Gwarube MP
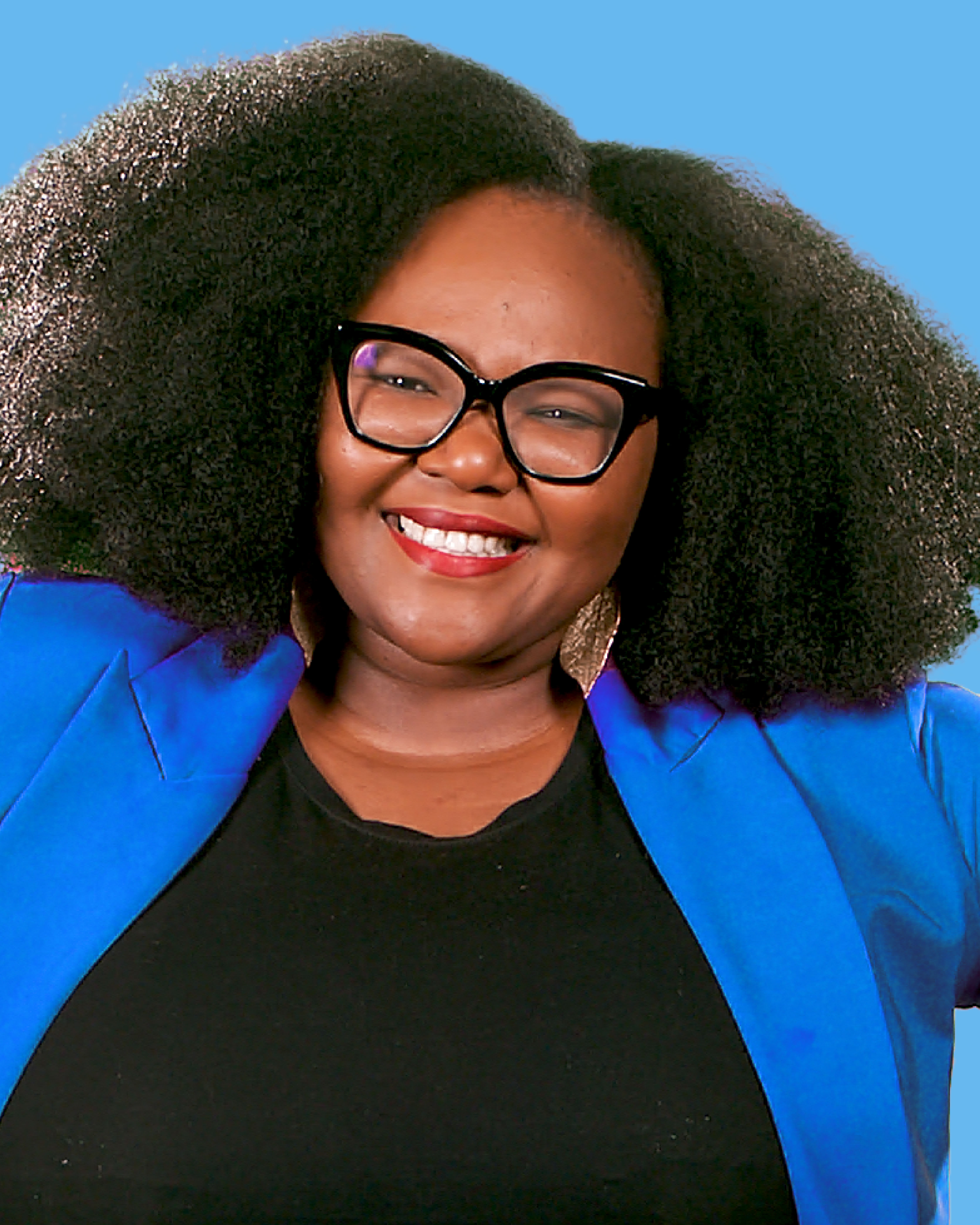
- Gwarube in 2024

Minister of Basic Education
- Incumbent
- Assumed office 3 July 2024
- President: Cyril Ramaphosa
- Deputy: Reginah Mhaule
- Preceded by: Angie Motshekga

Deputy Federal Chairperson of the Democratic Alliance
- Incumbent
- Assumed office 12 April 2026 Serving with Cilliers Brink and Solly Malatsi
- Leader: Geordin Hill-Lewis

Chief Whip of the Official Opposition
- In office 18 August 2022 – 14 June 2024
- Deputy: Annelie Lotriet
- Leader: John Steenhuisen
- Preceded by: Natasha Mazzone
- Succeeded by: Sihle Ngubane (Opposition); George Michalakis (DA)
Opposition offices 2019–2022
Deputy Chief Whip of the Official Opposition
In office 2 December 2021 – 18 August 2022
Leader	John Steenhuisen
Chief Whip	Natasha Mazzone
Preceded by	Jacques Julius
Succeeded by	Annelie Lotriet
National Spokesperson of the Democratic Alliance
In office 24 November 2020 – 18 August 2022
Leader	John Steenhuisen
Preceded by	Solly Malatsi; Refiloe Nt'sekhe
Succeeded by	Solly Malatsi; Cilliers Brink
Shadow Minister of Health
In office 5 June 2019 – 24 February 2022
Deputy	Lindy Wilson
Leader	John Steenhuisen; Mmusi Maimane
Preceded by	Patricia Kopane
Succeeded by	Michéle Clarke

Member of the National Assembly
- Incumbent
- Assumed office 22 May 2019

Personal details
- Born: 14 July 1989 (age 37) King William's Town, Cape Province; South Africa
- Party: Democratic Alliance
- Education: University of Cape Town (MDPP); Rhodes University

Siviwe Gwarube (born 14 July 1989) is a South African politician who is currently serving as Minister of Basic Education in the Government of National Unity (GNU) since July 2024. A member of the Democratic Alliance (DA), she has been a deputy federal chairperson of the party since April 2026. She was the Chief Whip of the Official Opposition between August 2022 and June 2024. She joined the National Assembly of South Africa in the May 2019 general election.

Born in the Eastern Cape, Gwarube entered politics in 2012 as a spokesperson for DA parliamentary leader Lindiwe Mazibuko. During the Sixth Parliament, before her appointment as the DA's Chief Whip, she served as Shadow Minister of Health from June 2019 to February 2022, national spokesperson of the DA from November 2020 to August 2022, and Deputy Chief Whip from December 2021 to August 2022.

== Early life and education ==
Born on 14 July 1989, Gwarube grew up in KwaMdingi, a village outside King William's Town in the former Cape Province. She was raised by her grandmother, who was an unmarried teacher. After matriculating at the Kingsridge High School for Girls in King William's Town, she studied law, politics, and philosophy at Rhodes University in Grahamstown. She graduated with a Bachelor of Arts in 2012. She graduated with a Master of Development Policy and Practice from the University of Cape Town's Nelson Mandela School of Government in 2026.

== Early career ==
In her final year as an undergraduate student, Gwarube was recruited into the Democratic Alliance (DA) Young Leaders Programme. In the programme she met Lindiwe Mazibuko, the Leader of the Opposition, who became her mentor. In January 2012, shortly after graduating, Gwarube moved to Cape Town to begin work as a spokesperson in Mazibuko's office. Thereafter she moved to the Western Cape Department of Health, where she was a spokesperson and head of ministry under Provincial Minister Nomafrench Mbombo. In the run-up to the 2019 general election, she was the DA's executive director of communications.

== Political career ==
=== DA caucus: 2019–2024 ===
In the May 2019 election, Gwarube was elected to represent the DA in the National Assembly, the lower house of the South African Parliament. She was also appointed as Shadow Minister of Health in the shadow cabinet of DA leader Mmusi Maimane, with Lindy Wilson as her deputy. She retained that position in the shadow cabinet of Maimane's successor, John Steenhuisen. Her time in the health portfolio coincided with the COVID-19 pandemic, as well as with the Digital Vibes scandal concerning alleged corruption in the Department of Health; in the latter connection, Gwarube laid criminal charges against Health Minister Zweli Mkhize.

On 24 November 2020, Steenhuisen announced Gwarube's appointment as the DA's new national spokesperson, a position previously held jointly by Solly Malatsi and Refilwe Ntsheke. She was in that role for just over a year before the DA held its internal midterm caucus elections on 2 December 2021. In a heated contest to succeed Jacques Julius as deputy chief whip of the DA parliamentary caucus, Gwarube was victorious against Chris Hunsinger and Angel Khanyile. Alongside her new position as deputy chief whip, she continued to serve as DA national spokesperson and as Shadow Minister of Health, until in February 2022 she ceded the health portfolio to Michéle Clarke.

On 18 August 2022, Gwarube was promoted to become chief whip of the DA caucus in the National Assembly; the incumbent, Natasha Mazzone, was sacked. Commentators remarked on Gwarube's "meteoric rise" through the caucus. In an editorial, Mondli Makhanya of City Press remarked that, although she was "an articulate, confident MP and party spokesperson whose voice you cannot miss", Gwarube remained relatively inexperienced; he warned her to guard against "being set up to fail". Gwarube, however, said that she was prepared for the role and that she intended "to navigate this space very authentically". Cilliers Brink and Solly Malatsi were appointed to take over her responsibilities as DA national spokesperson.

=== Minister of Basic Education: 2024–present ===
Gwarube was re-elected to her parliamentary seat in the May 2024 general election, and she was a member of the four-member team that represented the DA during subsequent coalition negotiations with the African National Congress (ANC). In line with the coalition agreement reached between the DA and ANC, President Cyril Ramaphosa appointed her as Minister of Basic Education. The ANC's Reginah Mhaule was appointed as her deputy. She was sworn in to office on 3 July 2024, and George Michalakis replaced her as the DA's chief whip.

Although the National Association of School Governing Bodies welcomed Gwarube's appointment to the education ministry, the South African Democratic Teachers Union objected strongly, with union leader Mugwena Maluleke telling the press that her ascension was an "affront" to the union.

=== Deputy Federal Chairperson of the DA: 2026–present ===
On 2 March 2026, Gwarube announced her candidacy for deputy federal chairperson of the DA, ahead of the party's Federal Congress. She endorsed Cape Town Mayor Geordin Hill-Lewis's campaign for DA leader. Gwarube was elected at the party's federal congress on 12 April 2026. She will serve alongside Solly Malatsi and Cilliers Brink.
