= Natasha Mazzone =

South African politician

The Honourable Natasha Mazzone MP OSI
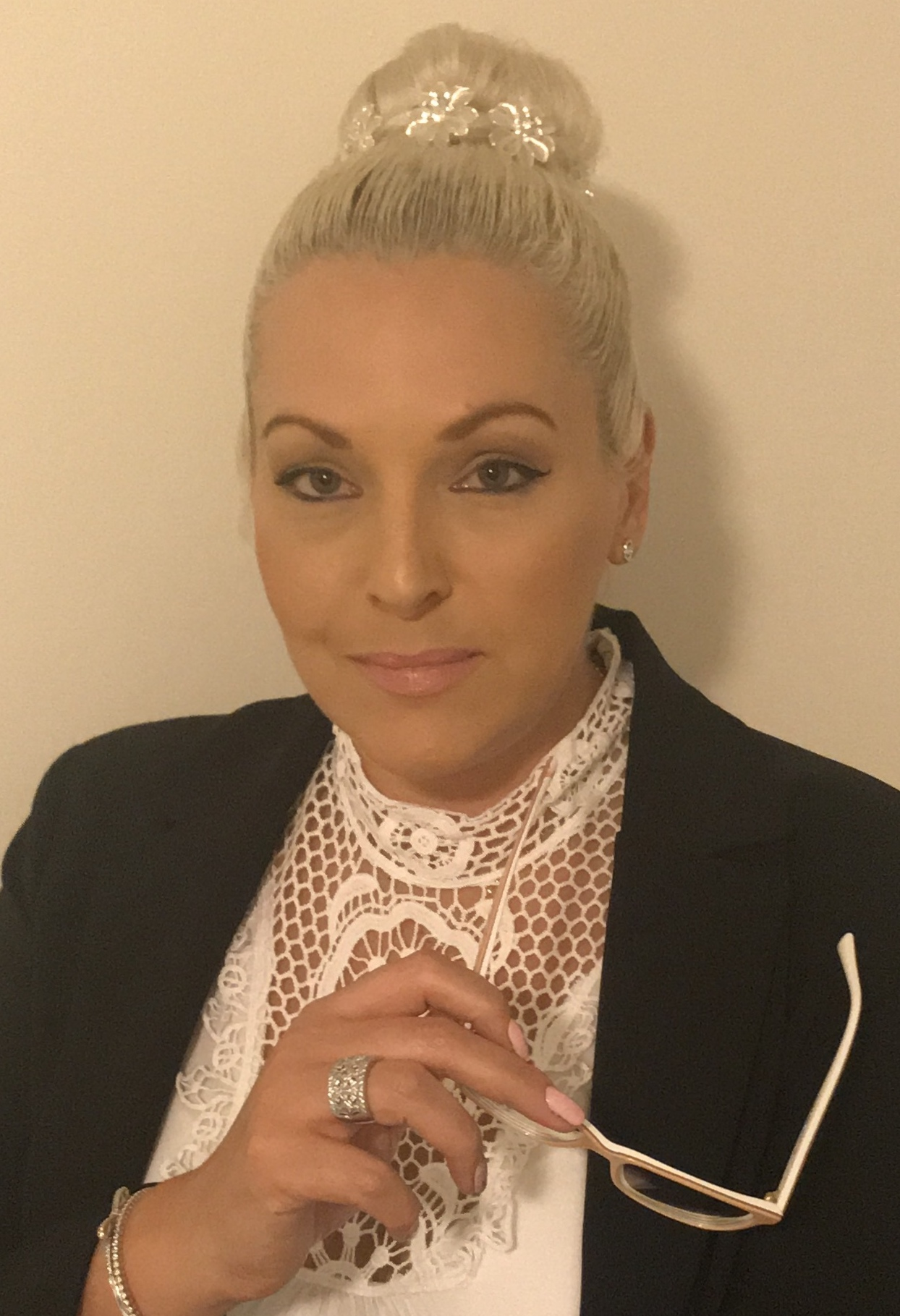
- Mazzone in 2018

Shadow Minister of Communications and Digital Technologies
- In office 21 April 2023 – 14 June 2024
- Leader: John Steenhuisen
- Preceded by: Dianne Kohler-Barnard
- Succeeded by: Position vacant

Shadow Minister of State Security National Security Advisor to the Leader of the Official Opposition
- In office 18 August 2022 – 21 April 2023
- Deputy: Dirk Stubbe
- Leader: John Steenhuisen
- Preceded by: Dianne Kohler Barnard
- Succeeded by: Dianne Kohler-Barnard

Chief Whip of the Official Opposition
- In office 31 October 2019 – 18 August 2022
- Deputy: Jacques Julius; Siviwe Gwarube
- Leader: John Steenhuisen
- Preceded by: Jacques Julius (acting); John Steenhuisen
- Succeeded by: Siviwe Gwarube

Deputy Chairperson of the Democratic Alliance Federal Council
- In office 10 April 2018 – 1 November 2020 Serving with Thomas Walters
- Leader: John Steenhuisen (interim); Mmusi Maimane; Helen Zille
- Chairperson: Helen Zille; James Selfe
- Preceded by: Position established
- Succeeded by: James Masango

Shadow Minister of Public Enterprises
- In office 1 February 2012 – 31 October 2019
- Leader: John Steenhuisen; Mmusi Maimane; Lindiwe Mazibuko
- Preceded by: Manie van Dyk
- Succeeded by: Ghaleb Cachalia

Shadow Minister of Communications
- In office 6 September 2010 – 1 February 2012
- Leader: Lindiwe Mazibuko; Athol Trollip
- Preceded by: Niekie van den Berg
- Succeeded by: Marian Shinn

Member of the National Assembly of South Africa
- Incumbent
- Assumed office 6 May 2009
- Constituency: Gauteng

Member of the Tshwane City Council
- In office December 2000 – May 2009

Personal details
- Born: Natasha Wendy Anita Mazzone; 9 May 1979 (age 47) Pretoria, Gauteng, South Africa
- Party: Democratic Alliance (2000–present)
- Other political affiliations: Democratic Party (1997–2000)
- Spouse: Kevin Mileham (m. 2017)
- Education: The Glen High School
- Occupation: Politician; civic activist; legislator
- Religion: Buddhism

Order of the Star of Italy - OSI
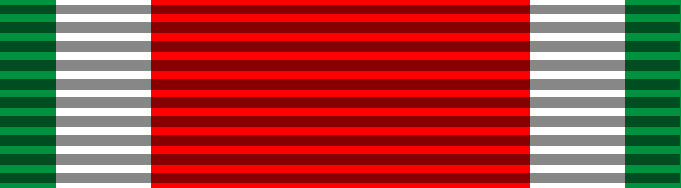
- Ribbon of the order
- Type: Knighthood
- Awarded for: Ms. N.W.A Mazzone
- Presented by: Italy
- First award: 2021

Natasha Wendy Anita Mazzone MP OSI (born 9 May 1979) is a South African politician who served as the Chief Whip of the Official Opposition in the National Assembly of South Africa from October 2019 until August 2022. She has been a member of the National Assembly, representing the Democratic Alliance (DA), since 2009. She was the second Deputy Federal Council Chairperson of the DA and the party's spokesperson on state capture. Mazzone has previously served as Shadow Minister of Public Enterprises and of Communications.

== Early life and education ==
Mazzone is the child of immigrant parents and was born in Pretoria, South Africa. Her father Giovanni was born in Pietrastornina in the Province of Avellino in Italy and was a chef. He died in April 2021. Her mother Valerie was born in London, England. Mazzone is the youngest of three children. She attended Sunnyside Primary School and matriculated from The Glen High School, Pretoria in 1996. She passed matric with a university exemption.

In 1997, she enrolled for a law degree at the University of Pretoria. She was active in student politics at UP, serving as the speaker of the Students' Representative Council (SRC) between 2000 and 2001. She did not complete her law degree. Mazzone left the UP in 2002 and enrolled at the University of South Africa (UNISA). In September 2002, she began taking courses towards a Bachelor of Laws (LLB). She did other courses in 2003, 2007, and 2010, respectively, but she did not receive sufficient credits to get her law degree. Mazzone did her legal articles between 2002 and 2007 under Victor Williams at Hahn & Hahn Attorneys in Hatfield, Pretoria. She completed her articles in accordance with Section 5(3) of the Attorneys Act, which stated that a candidate could do their articles in five years if they were studying towards an LLB. In 2004, Mazzone did a practical legal training course at Legal Education and Development (LEAD) and received a certificate.

Mazzone studied music and opera at the Lorraine Haverman School of Music. In 2010, Mazzone was selected to attend the American Council of Young Political Leaders program.

== Political career ==
=== Youth leader ===
She started her political career in 1997 at the University of Pretoria (UP), where she was the chairperson of the Democratic Party (DP) Youth branch. In 1998, she was elected as the National Federal Youth Leader of the DP. In the same year, she was elected to the Student Representative Council at UP and was the Executive member for Student Safety. In 1999, Mazzone was elected as the Speaker of the UP SRC. In 2000, the Democratic Alliance (DA) was formed, and the DP formed part of this merger. She was then elected as the National Federal Youth Leader of the DA, a position she held until 2004.

=== Tshwane City Council ===
In 2000, Mazzone stood for election as a city councillor in the Tshwane Metro. She was elected in December, and at age 21, she was the youngest councillor in the municipality. In 2003, the DA caucus in the Metro elected Mazzone to the position of Chief Whip of the Official Opposition, and she held this position until her election to Parliament in May 2009.

=== Parliamentary career ===
Mazzone was sworn in as a Member of Parliament on 6 May 2009. She was first made the Shadow Deputy Minister of Justice and Constitutional Development by Parliamentary Leader Athol Trollip. During Trollip's first Shadow cabinet reshuffle, Mazzone was made the Shadow Minister of Communications. She held this position until newly elected Parliamentary Leader Lindiwe Mazibuko appointed her to the position of Shadow Minister of Public Enterprises.

Mazzone represents the Democratic Alliance on the Joint Standing Committee on the Financial Management of Parliament, the Disciplinary Committee, and the Rules Committee. Formerly a member of both the Portfolio Committee on Public Enterprises and the Portfolio Committee on Communications, she was also the party whip in charge of legislation before her appointment as chief whip.

Mazzone has also been involved in the provincial politics of Gauteng. She was elected as one of three deputy provincial chairpersons of the Democratic Alliance in October 2009. In April 2010, she ran for Provincial Leader of the DA. She faced former DA MP Janet Semple and incumbent John Moodey. Mazzone was eliminated in the first round and Semple went on to narrowly win the election.

At the DA's 2018 Federal Congress, Mazzone was elected as the second Deputy Federal Council Chairperson of the party. She served alongside Thomas Walters. Her election was initially disputed by Khume Ramulifho, who also contested the position, and other senior DA politicians. Ramulifho argued that her taking up the position was illegal since the position was not yet created when the election was held. The party's Federal Legal Commission had taken the decision to appoint her since she received the second most votes. The party later resolved the matter.

On 31 October 2019, Mazzone was appointed Chief Whip of the Official Opposition, succeeding John Steenhuisen, who was elected DA parliamentary leader and became Leader of the Opposition. She is the party's first female chief whip. In 2020, she stood down as a deputy federal council chairperson.

On 18 August 2022, Steenhuisen appointed deputy chief whip Siviwe Gwarube as the new chief whip of the DA parliamentary caucus and as the Chief Whip of the Official Opposition, succeeding Mazzone. Mazzone was appointed as the National Security Advisor to the Leader of the Opposition and will now serve on the Joint Standing Committee on Intelligence.

In March 2023, Mazzone announced that she was a candidate for one of the three deputy federal chairperson positions at the party's Federal Congress in April. She endorsed Steenhuisen for a second term as party leader. She lost at the party's congress on 2 April 2023.

Mazzone was appointed as Shadow Minister of Communications and Digital Technologies on 21 April 2023.

Mazzone was re-elected for a fourth term in Parliament in the 2024 general election.

== 2021 Wikipedia article qualifications controversy ==
In April 2021, the DA Western Cape leader, Bonginkosi Madikizela, was suspended for having lied on his CV about having a BCom degree. Mazzone's Wikipedia article was then edited by an anonymous user, who changed her occupation in the infobox from 'Advocate' to 'None'. 'Advocate' was added to the infobox in October 2020 by an anonymous editor. Mazzone was then accused by Good party Secretary-General Brett Herron of editing the Wikipedia article about her to remove the word 'Advocate' from the infobox and lying about having a law degree and being an advocate. Party insiders also claimed that she had misrepresented her qualifications to get a seat on the Federal Legal Commission of the DA.

Mazzone has accused detractors of "fiddling" with the Wikipedia article and said she didn't complete the degree, but did do legal articles. She has also said that she only has matric. The Good party called for the DA to take action against Mazzone, and Herron wrote an open letter to DA leader John Steenhuisen on 20 April 2021 requesting that the DA provide clarity on the matter and address questions surrounding the controversy, such as when did she do her articles, did she complete them and why some websites list her as having legal qualifications. The DA's Ashor Sarupen responded to Herron on 21 April, saying that Mazzone completed her articles in terms of Section 5(3) of the Attorneys Act and she has done her LEAD [Legal Education and Development] Training. Sarupen also said that her biography on the DA website did not make reference to any legal qualifications. Herron responded by saying that there is a lot of ambiguity about Mazzone's qualifications.

On 27 April 2021, Daily Maverick published an article 'Fact-checking Natasha Mazzone's qualifications claims' in which journalist Rebecca Davis addressed claims that Mazzone had been dishonest about her educational background and that she claimed to have a law degree that she never completed. Daily Maverick found she did not achieve a law degree at UP and UNISA, respectively, but did do her legal articles as per Section 5(3) of the Attorneys Act at Hahn & Hahn Attorneys. They concluded that they have yet to obtain evidence that Mazzone had been dishonest about her education.

== Personal life ==
Mazzone is a Buddhist. She married fellow Democratic Alliance MP Kevin Mileham in July 2017.

== Awards ==
In March 2021, she became a recipient of the Order of the Star of Italy, an equivalent of a knighthood in Italy.

Political offices
Preceded by Niekie van den Berg	South African Shadow Minister of Communications; 2009–2011	Succeeded by Marian Shinn
Preceded by Manie van Dyk	South African Shadow Minister of Public Enterprises; 2012–2019	Succeeded by Ghaleb Cachalia
Preceded by John Steenhuisen; Jacques Julius (acting)	Chief Whip of the Official Opposition; 2019–2022	Succeeded by Siviwe Gwarube
