= Kevin Mileham =

South African politician

The Honourable Kevin Mileham MP
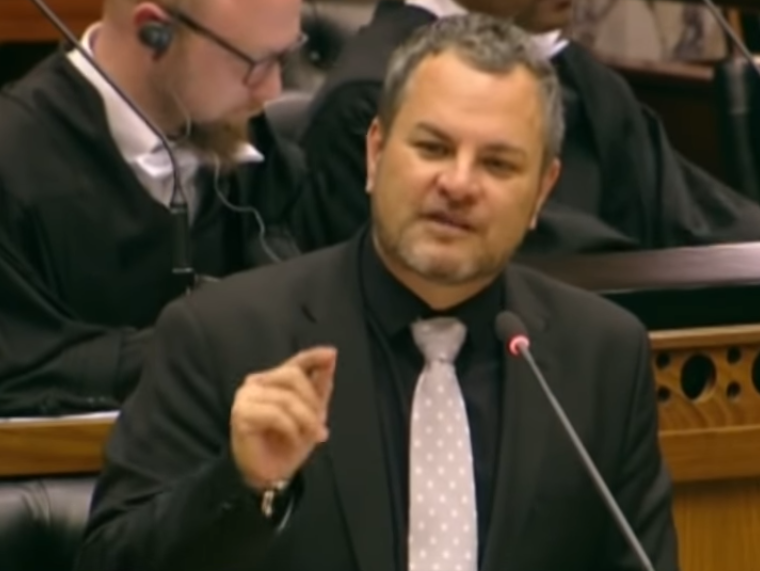
- Mileham during a parliamentary debate in September 2019

Chief Whip of the Democratic Alliance Buffalo City Caucus
- In office May 2011 – June 2013

Chief Whip of the Democratic Alliance Ndlambe Caucus
- In office April 2006 – May 2011

Personal details
- Born: Kevin John Mileham; 23 April 1971 (age 55) Durban, South Africa
- Party: Democratic Alliance
- Spouse: Natasha Mazzone
- Education: University of the Witwatersrand
- Occupation: Politician

Kevin John Mileham (born 23 April 1971) is a South African politician, a Member of the South African Parliament for the Democratic Alliance and the shadow minister of mineral resources and energy. Mileham was first elected to Parliament on 3 June 2013, replacing Athol Trollip. His first parliamentary role was as the shadow deputy minister of land reform and rural development. After the 2014 national elections, he was appointed the shadow minister of cooperative governance and traditional affairs. In February 2019, he was appointed as shadow minister of energy. After the national and provincial elections on 8 May 2019, Mileham was appointed as shadow minister of the expanded portfolio of mineral resources and energy. Mileham was re-elected to Parliament in 2024.

== Background ==
Mileham matriculated with academic honours from Selborne College in East London in 1988 and went on to graduate with a Bachelor of Commerce (legal) degree from the University of the Witwatersrand. He continued his studies to obtain a postgraduate diploma in advertising and marketing from AAA School of Advertising.

Post studies, he commenced work for The Jupiter Drawing Room, a South African advertising agency, handling brands such as Coca-Cola and 5FM. In 1996, he was employed by Coca-Cola to launch the Powerade sports drink in South Africa. In 1998 he joined Microsoft South Africa as a marketing manager, initially only covering consumer products, but later promoted to include all desktop applications (including Microsoft Office and Windows) for both the consumer and business sectors. In 2001, he relocated to the Eastern Cape, where he founded his own marketing and management consultancy business, Forward Momentum.

Mileham has two children from his first marriage to Laura Guest. He married fellow Democratic Alliance Member of Parliament, Natasha Mazzone in July 2017.

== Politics ==
Mileham was actively involved in party politics for the former Democratic Party as a party agent and activist during the 1994 and 1999 elections. In 2003, he became actively involved in local politics. He joined the Democratic Alliance in Port Alfred (Ndlambe Local Municipality) where he was soon appointed constituency chairperson. In 2006, he was elected to the Ndlambe municipal council, and appointed as the party's Chief Whip and finance spokesperson.

In 2007, Mileham was selected to be part of the first class of Democratic Alliance's Young Leaders Programme. In 2009, he stood unsuccessfully for Parliament. In 2011, he was elected as a municipal councillor to the Buffalo City Metropolitan Municipality, and was appointed as the DA's chief whip.

In 2013, following the death of Pine Pienaar, a member of the Eastern Cape Provincial Legislature, the DA's provincial leader Athol Trollip elected to return to the province following his reelection defeat to Lindiwe Mazibuko for the position of DA parliamentary leader. The DA selected Mileham to fill the seat. Mazibuko appointed him shadow deputy minister for land reform and rural development.

After his re-election in 2014, Mileham was appointed the shadow minister of cooperative governance and traditional affairs by the new leader of the opposition, Mmusi Maimane. During tenure as shadow minister of COGTA, Mileham laid criminal charges against people involved in the VBS Mutual Bank scandal. In February 2019, he was appointed as shadow minister of energy. He held this position until June 2019, when Maimane appointed him as shadow minister of mineral resources and energy.

On 21 June 2021, Mileham became a member of the Committee for Section 194 Enquiry which was established to determine Advocate Busisiwe Mkhwebane's fitness to hold office as Public Protector.

Mileham was re-elected to Parliament in 2024.

Political offices
Preceded by Mpowele Swathe	South African Shadow Deputy Minister of Rural Development and Land Reform; 2013–2014	Succeeded by Thomas Walters
Preceded by John Steenhuisen	South African Shadow Minister of Cooperative Governance & Traditional Affairs; 2014–2019	Succeeded by Joe McGluwa
Preceded by Gavin Davis	South African Shadow Minister of Energy; Feb 2019 – Jun 2019	Succeeded by Position dissolved
Preceded by Position established	South African Shadow Minister of Mineral Resources & Energy; Jun 2019 – June 2024	Succeeded by Position vacant
Incumbent
