= Butch Steyn =

South African politician

Arron Cecil Steyn MP
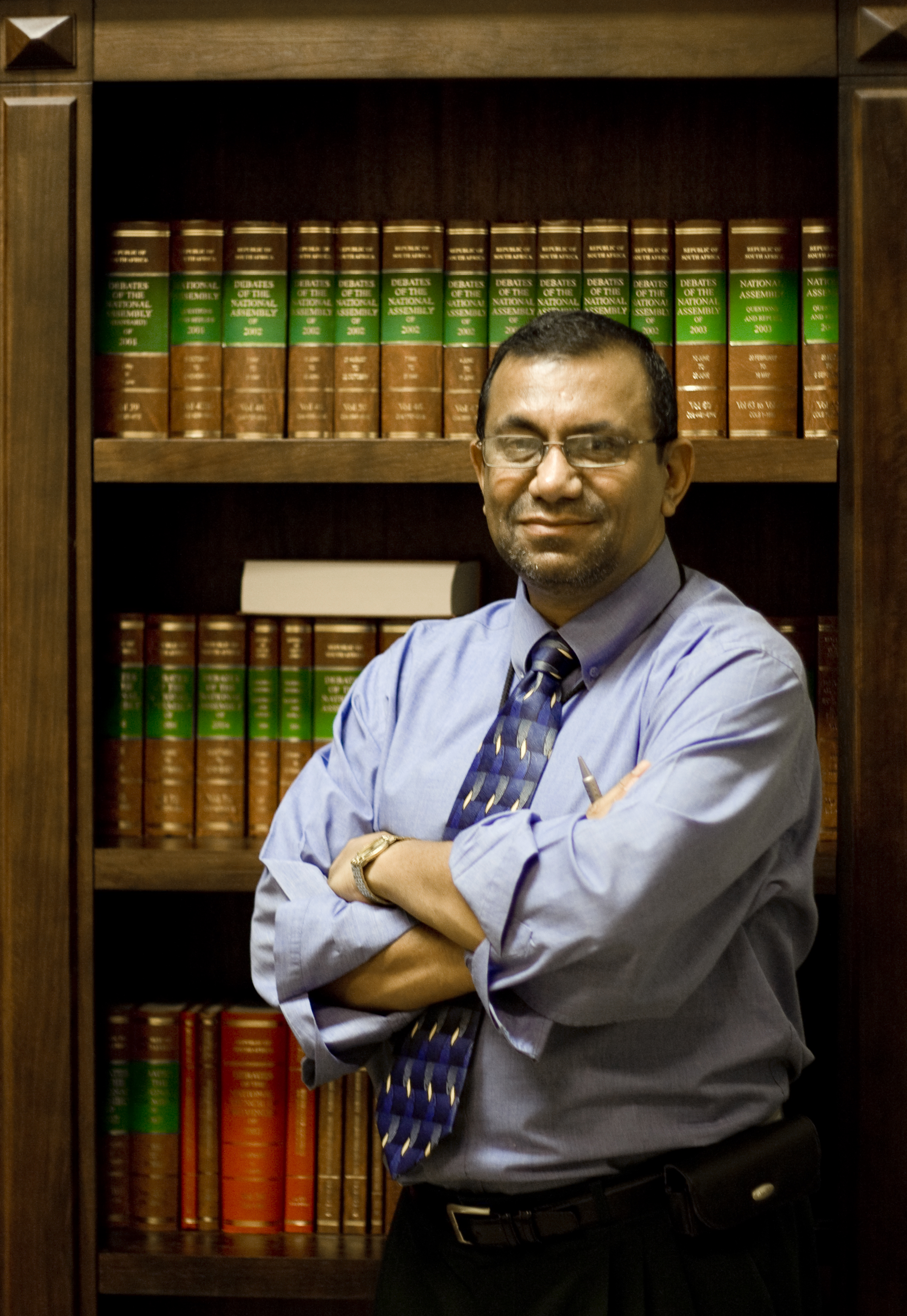

Shadow Minister of Human Settlements
- In office 2004–2012
- Leader: Helen Zille
- Succeeded by: Stevens Mokgalapa

Member of Parliament for Florida, Gauteng
- In office 2004–2014

Personal details
- Party: Democratic Alliance
- Profession: Civil Engineer

Arron Cecil "Butch" Steyn is a South African politician, and a former Member of Parliament with the Democratic Alliance, and the Shadow Minister of Human Settlements from 2004 to 2012. He currently serves as a municipal councillor in the City of Johannesburg.

== Early career ==
Before entering the political arena on a full-time basis, Butch practised as a Civil Engineer and was a partner in a national firm of Consulting Engineers before becoming Managing Director of his own practice. Prior to that, he offered an architectural consulting service which led to the birth of a construction company. During his professional life, he specialised in the design of high rise structures such as office blocks, hotels, shopping centres, casinos and multi-storey apartment buildings. With the slump in the construction industry during the late 80s and early 90s, he also did project management work, particularly in the oil/fuel industry for depot upgrades.

== Political career ==
Butch was elected to the National Assembly in April 2004 and also served as a Democratic Alliance representative in the Gauteng Legislature from 1999 to 2004. He was also the first (and only) Democratic Party councillor in the Western Metropolitan Council of Johannesburg from 1994 to 1995 and later in the South-West Metropolitan Council (Roodepoort) between 1995 and 1999.

Steyn left parliament after the 2014 general election, but eventually returned to politics in November 2019, when he was sworn in as a PR councillor for the DA in Johannesburg.

== Policy Issues ==
Butch Steyn has been a vocal critic of lack of oversight and monitoring in the Department of Human Settlements regarding the allocation of tenders and quality of work of contractors in the building of formal housing.

== Offices held ==
Political offices
Preceded by Niekie van den Berg	Shadow Deputy Minister of Communications; 2012–present	Incumbent
Preceded by ??	Shadow Minister of Human Settlements; 2004–2012	Succeeded by Stevens Mokgalapa
