= Annette Lovemore =

South African politician

Annette Lovemore MP
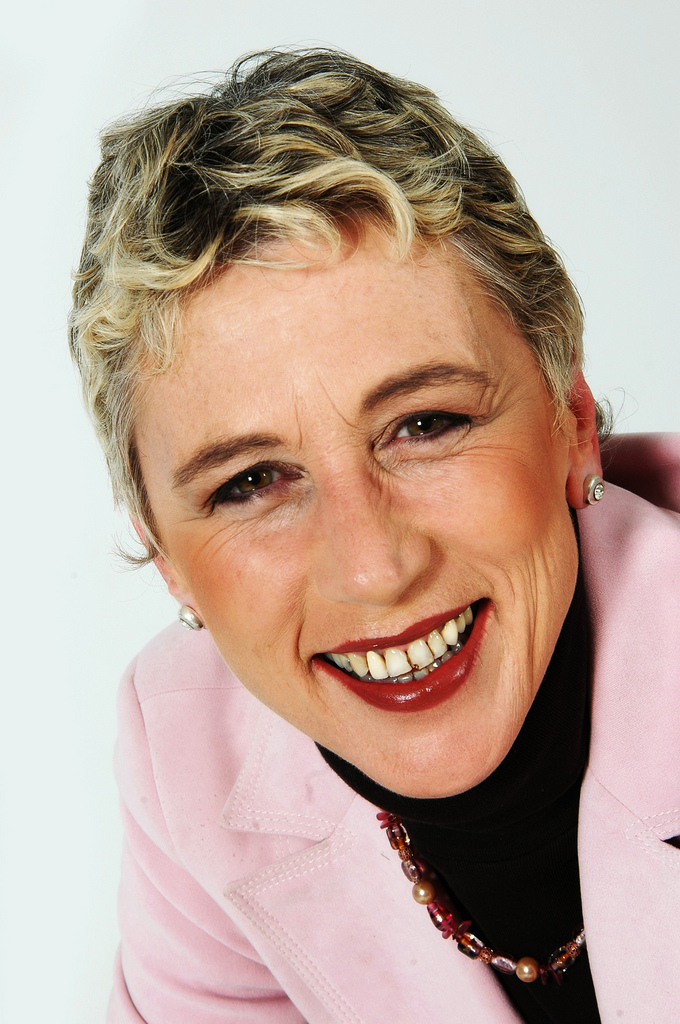

Shadow Minister of Public Service and Administration
- In office 3 October 2015 – 18 August 2016
- Leader: Mmusi Maimane

Shadow Minister of Basic Education
- In office 1 February 2012 – 3 October 2015
- Leader: Helen Zille; Mmusi Maimane
- Preceded by: Wilmot James
- Succeeded by: Gavin Davis

Member of Parliament for Eastern Cape
- In office 6 May 2009 – 18 August 2016

Personal details
- Born: 20 December 1958 (age 67)
- Party: Democratic Alliance

Annette Lovemore is a South African politician for the Democratic Alliance (DA), and the mayoral committee member (MMC) of infrastructure and engineering in the Nelson Mandela Bay coalition government that took office in 2016. She previously served as a DA Member of Parliament between 2009 and 2016.

== Early life ==
Annette Lovemore was born on 20 December 1958. She graduated from Kimberly Girls' High School in 1975 and went on to receive her BSc at University of Cape Town in 1978.

== Political life ==
Lovemore served as a councillor in the Nelson Mandela Bay Municipality before being elected to Parliament in 2009. As the DA's Shadow Minister of Home Affairs, she has continuously brought to light the inadequacies of handling of the refugee applicants within South Africa, laws that could hurt the prospects of foreign investments into the country, and the Department of Home Affairs seemingly nonchalant handling of ID, grant and pension fraud happening from foreigners illegally in South Africa. She later served as Shadow Minister of Basic Education.

After the opposition victory in Nelson Mandela Bay in 2016, Lovemore left parliament to become a member of the mayoral committee, where she'll be focusing on Infrastructure and Engineering.
