= Niekie van den Berg =

South African politician

Nicolaas Jacobus van der Berg MP

Shadow Minister of Arts and Culture
- In office 2012–2014
- Leader: Helen Zille
- Preceded by: Annelie Lotriet
- Succeeded by: Winston Rabotapi

Member of Parliament for Merafong, Gauteng
- In office 6 May 2009 – 8 May 2014

Personal details
- Party: Democratic Alliance, Freedom Front Plus (2014- )

Niekie van de Berg is a South African politician, formerly a Member of Parliament with the Democratic Alliance. He served as the DA Shadow Minister of Arts and Culture from 2012 until 2014, when he was succeeded by Winston Rabotapi. He is a former talk radio presenter with Radio Sonder Grense.

Van den Berg announced his resignation from the Democratic Alliance in 2014 and joined the smaller Freedom Front Plus.

== Offices held ==
Political offices
Preceded by Dene Smuts	Shadow Deputy Minister of Communications; 2009–2012	Succeeded by Butch Steyn
Preceded by Annelie Lotriet	Shadow Minister of Arts and Culture; 2012-2014	Succeeded by Winston Rabotapi
