= Jacques Julius =

South African politician

Jacques Julius MP

Deputy Chief Whip of the Official Opposition
- In office 30 May 2019 – 2 December 2021
- Leader: John Steenhuisen; Mmusi Maimane
- Preceded by: Mike Waters
- Succeeded by: Siviwe Gwarube

Member of the National Assembly of South Africa
- In office 22 May 2019 – 18 August 2022

Permanent delegate to the National Council of Provinces from Gauteng
- In office 22 May 2014 – 7 May 2019

Personal details
- Born: Jacques Warren William Julius; 4 June 1972 (age 53) Randfontein, Transvaal Province, South Africa
- Party: Democratic Alliance
- Occupation: Member of Parliament
- Profession: Politician

Jacques Warren William Julius (born 4 June 1972) is a South African Democratic Alliance politician from Gauteng who served as the Deputy Chief Whip of the Official Opposition in the National Assembly of South Africa from May 2019 to December 2021. He was acting Chief Whip between the resignation of John Steenhuisen and the appointment of Natasha Mazzone in October 2019. He became a Member of the National Assembly in May 2019. Julius served a permanent delegate to the National Council of Provinces from May 2014 to May 2019.

On 21 November 2020, Julius was elected chairperson of the DA's West Rand region in Gauteng. Ahead of the DA parliamentary caucus midterm leadership elections in December 2021, Julius had decided against running for re-election as deputy chief whip of the DA caucus. Siviwe Gwarube was elected to replace him. Julius was elected as one of the party's 12 whips.

Julius resigned from Parliament on 18 August 2022.
