= Manie van Dyk =

South African politician

Manie van Dyk MP
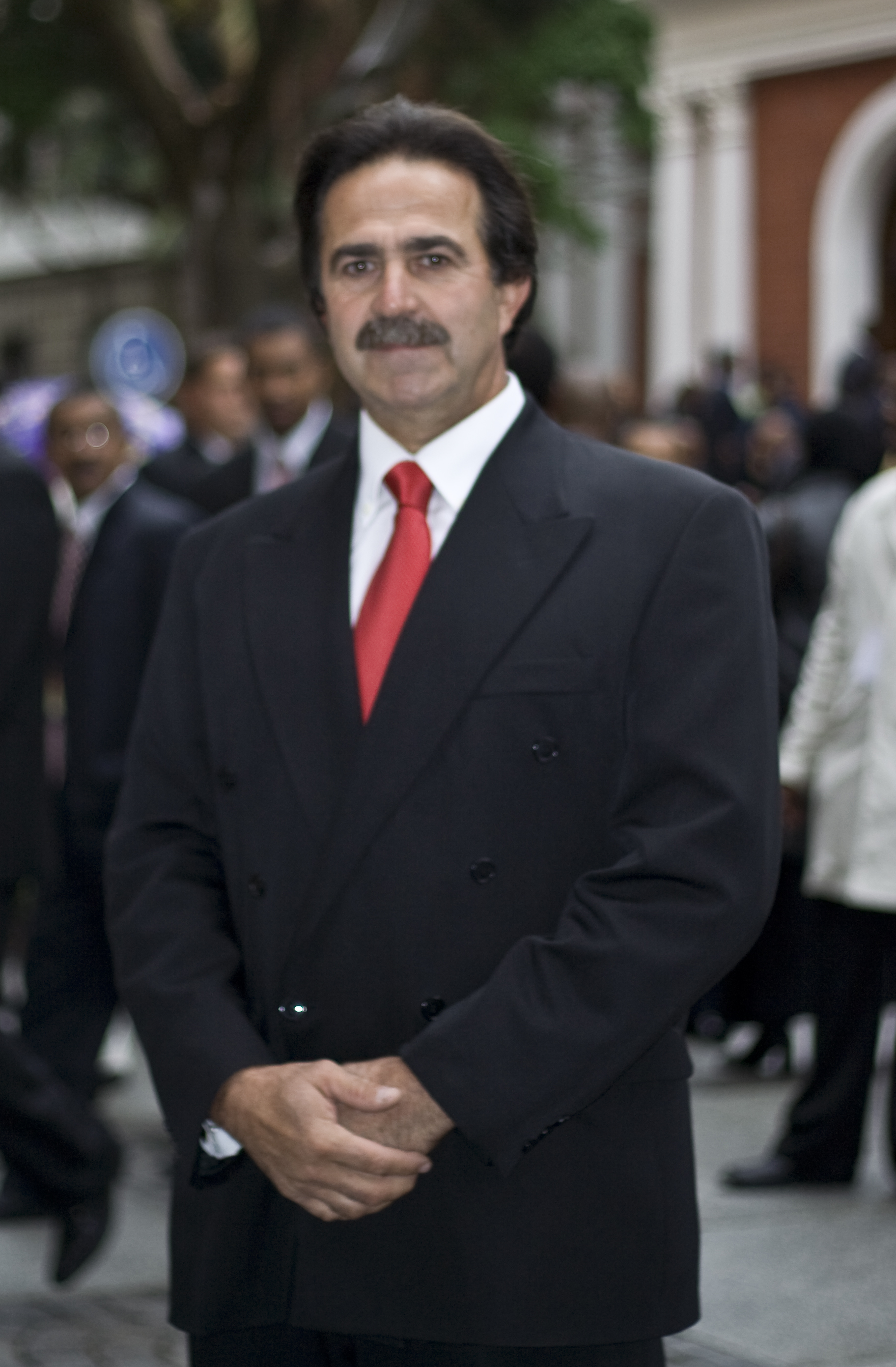

Shadow Minister of Public Enterprises
- In office 2009–2012
- Leader: Helen Zille

Member of Parliament for Northern, Central & Western Pretoria, Gauteng
- In office 6 May 2009 – 2014

Personal details
- Born: 1955/01/01
- Party: Democratic Alliance
- Education: University of Johannesburg and University of Potchefstroom
- Profession: Economist

Manie van Dyk is a South African politician, a former Member of Parliament with the Democratic Alliance, and the Shadow Minister of Public Enterprises.

Political offices
Preceded by ??	Shadow Minister of Public Enterprises; 2009–present	Incumbent
