= Gavin Davis =

South African politician

Gavin Davis MP

Shadow Minister of Energy
- In office 1 January 2018 – 15 October 2018
- Shadowing: Jeff Radebe
- Preceded by: Gordon Mackay

Shadow Minister of Basic Education
- In office 3 October 2015 – 1 June 2017
- Shadowing: Angie Motshekga
- Preceded by: Annette Lovemore
- Succeeded by: Ian Ollis

Shadow Minister of Communications
- In office 5 June 2014 – 3 October 2015
- Shadowing: Faith Muthambi
- Preceded by: Marian Shinn
- Succeeded by: Phumzile van Damme

Personal details
- Born: 3 August 1977 (age 49)

Gavin Davis (born 3 August 1977) is a South African communications strategist and Managing Partner of Ockham Communications, a public affairs consultancy. He previously served as a Member of Parliament and held several shadow cabinet positions.

== Background ==
Davis grew up in Cape Town, South Africa. He holds Honours and master's degrees in politics and economics from Rhodes University, the University of Cape Town and the University of London. His interests include education, electoral systems and campaigning, media and elections, public broadcasting, social media and liberalism in South African politics.

== Political Communications ==
Davis joined the DA as a Researcher in 2004 and was later appointed Chief of Staff in the Leader's Office. After a stint as a Special Advisor to the Premier of the Western Cape, Helen Zille, Davis was appointed Executive Director of Communications for the DA in 2011.

As the DA's Executive Director of Communications, Davis was instrumental in the party's successful integration of traditional and digital marketing techniques. The party's 2013 'anonymous' anti-etolling billboard and accompanying social media campaign was pioneering in this regard.

Davis was central to a number of campaigns that sought to broaden the DA's appeal beyond its traditional support base. This included the 2013 'Know Your DA' campaign and the 2014 election campaign which began with a controversial protest march against unemployment outside the headquarters of the African National Congress in Johannesburg.

Davis is credited with authoring a number of key speeches for the party leadership. This included DA Leader Mmusi Maimane's seminal 'Broken Man' speech delivered during the 2015 debate on the State of the Nation Debate in Parliament that captured the nation's mood and turned the tide against President Zuma. The speech is featured in the book 'Speeches that Shaped South Africa', which devotes a chapter to its significance.

== Member of Parliament ==
In 2014, Davis was placed ninth on the DA's list of Western Cape candidates for the National Assembly. In May 2014, Davis was elected by the DA caucus to serve as a Whip. In the same month, Parliamentary Leader Mmusi Maimane appointed Davis to the position of Shadow Minister of Communications.

In July 2014, Davis initiated a parliamentary inquiry into allegations that SABC Chairperson Ellen Tshabalala had lied to Parliament about her qualifications when she applied for a position on the SABC Board. The inquiry eventually found Tshabalala guilty of misconduct and perjury, and recommended her removal from the Board. Tshabalala resigned before she could be formally removed on 17 December 2014. In January 2015, Davis exposed the irregular channeling of government money to The New Age newspaper owned by the Gupta family, an early indicator of the 'state capture' scandal that would later bring down President Zuma.

On 3 October 2015, DA Leader Mmusi Maimane appointed Davis as Shadow Minister of Basic Education. Davis was an avid campaigner for equal education, and a fierce opponent of the militant South African Democratic Teachers' Union. On 16 February 2016, he gave a speech in the debate on the State of the Nation Address calling on President Zuma to "smash the SADTU protection racket, so that we can improve the education of every child." Political commentator Andrew Kenny described it in The Citizen newspaper as the best speech he had heard in the debate. "It was sincere, told an obvious truth, and dealt with a terrible problem, the appalling education of our black children", said Kenny. In January 2018, he was appointed Shadow Minister of Energy.

== Liberalism ==
Davis has been a vocal proponent of liberal views inside and outside the Democratic Alliance. In the lead-up to the DA's 2018 Federal Congress he co-authored (with Michael Cardo MP) a letter to Congress delegates warning of anti-liberal tendencies contained in the proposed 'diversity clause' to be inserted into the party constitution. A number of amendments proposed by Davis and Cardo were unanimously agreed to at the Congress.

== Resignation from Parliament ==
In October 2018 Davis announced he was leaving Parliament to take up a senior communications role in the private sector. In 2022, Davis founded Ockham Communications, a strategic communications and public affairs consultancy that advises corporate and non-profit clients across a range of sectors. The firm also publishes The Ockham Observer, a weekly news diary focused on upcoming local and global events of significance.
