= Winston Rabotapi =

Member of the North West Provincial Legislature in South Africa

The Honourable Winston Rabotapi MPL
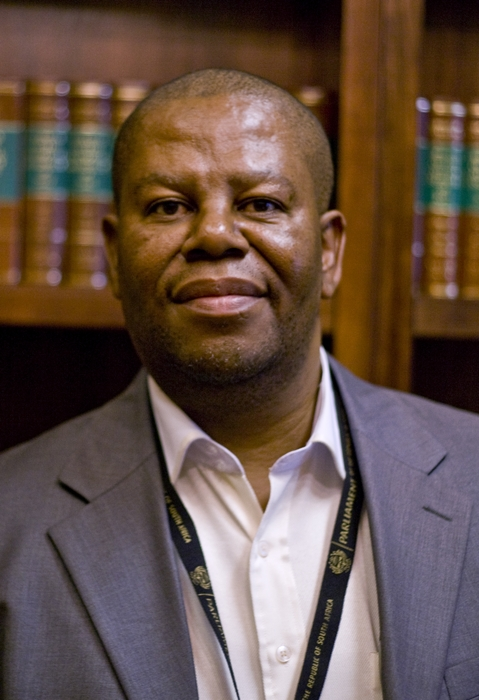
- Rabotapi in June 2010

Member of the North West Provincial Legislature
- Incumbent
- Assumed office 22 May 2019

Member of the National Assembly
- In office 6 May 2009 – 7 May 2019

Personal details
- Born: 1960 or 1961 (age 65–66)
- Party: Democratic Alliance
- Occupation: Politician

Mponeng Winston Rabotapi is a South African politician of the Democratic Alliance (DA). He has been serving as the party's caucus leader in the North West Provincial Legislature since 2019. He previously served as a Member of the National Assembly from 2009 to 2019.

== Political career ==
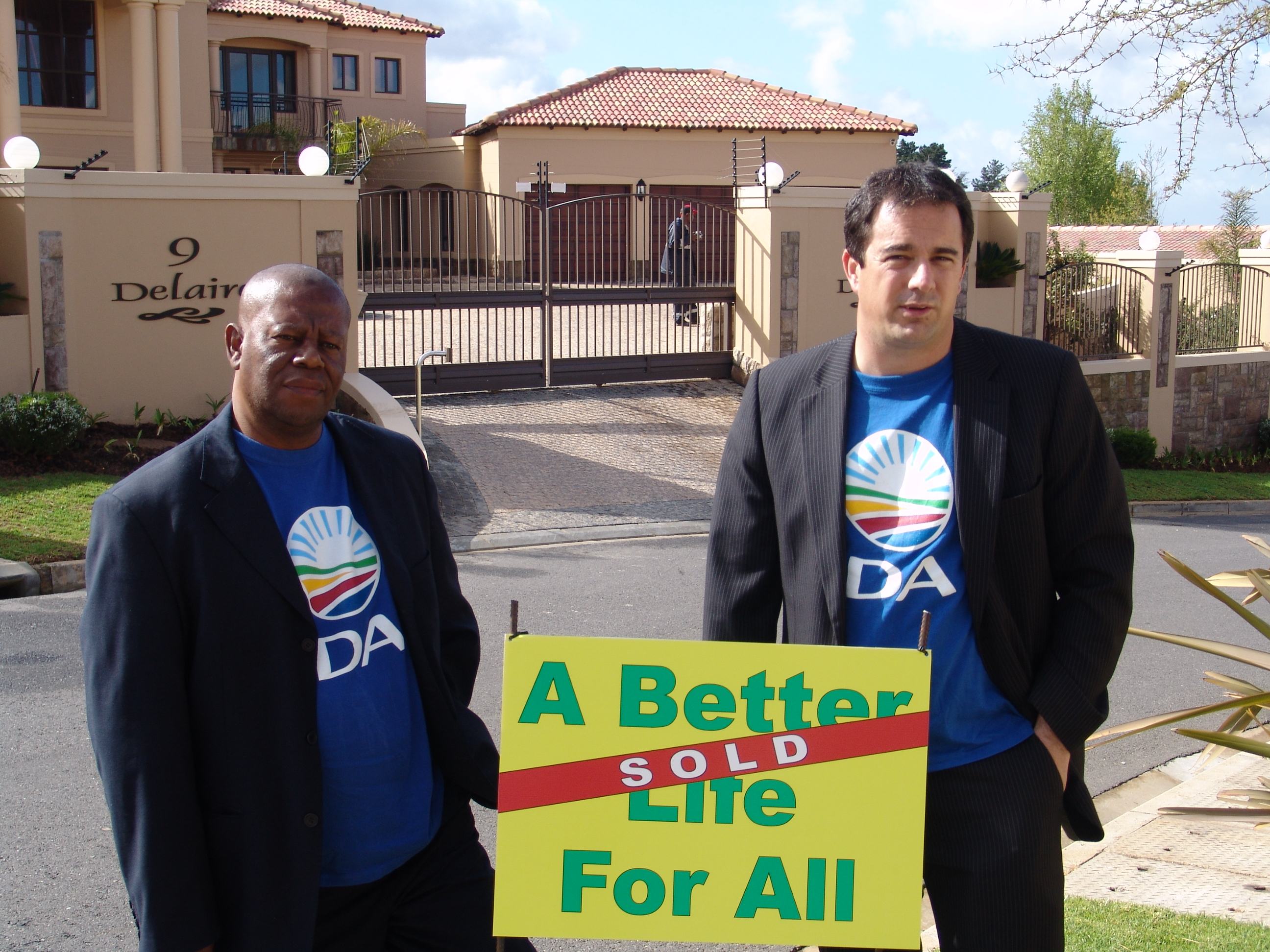
Rabotapi and John Steenhuisen in 2011

Rabotapi served as a municipal councillor for the Democratic Party in the Brits municipality. He also served as the party's Deputy Provincial Leader for two separate terms.

Rabotapi was elected to the National Assembly of South Africa in 2009. He became a Member on 6 May 2009. On 14 May 2009, Democratic Alliance Parliamentary Leader Athol Trollip named Rabotapi as the Shadow Deputy Minister of Public Works.

In February 2012, the DA Parliamentary Leader Lindiwe Mazibuko appointed him to the position of Shadow Minister of Sports and Recreation.

After the 2014 elections, the DA Parliamentary Leader Mmusi Maimane retained Rabotapi in the Shadow Cabinet and moved him to the Arts and Culture portfolio.

The Democratic Alliance parliamentary caucus elected Rabotapi as a party whip in February 2016.

Following the 2019 elections, Rabotapi moved to the North West Provincial Legislature. He was sworn into office on 22 May 2019 and the DA's caucus elected him caucus leader.
