= Nicholas Myburgh =

South African politician (born 1962)

Nicholas Myburgh MP

Member of the National Assembly of South Africa
- Incumbent
- Assumed office 8 September 2021
- Preceded by: Phumzile van Damme

Executive Mayor of the Swellendam Local Municipality
- In office June 2011 – 7 September 2021
- Preceded by: Jan Jansen
- Succeeded by: Francois Du Rand

Personal details
- Born: Nicholas Georg Myburgh; 14 November 1964 (age 61) Swellendam, Cape Province, South Africa
- Party: Democratic Alliance
- Spouse: Sally
- Children: 2
- Education: Rondebosch Boys' High School
- Alma mater: Stellenbosch University (LLB)
- Occupation: Member of Parliament
- Profession: Politician; Farmer; Lawyer

Nicholas Georg Myburgh (born 14 November 1962) is a South African farmer, lawyer and politician for the Democratic Alliance. He has been a Member of Parliament (MP) since 2021. Myburgh had previously served as the Executive Mayor of the Swellendam Local Municipality from 2011 to 2021.

== Early life and education ==
Myburgh was born in Swellendam on 14 November 1962. He attended Swellendam Primary School, Western Province Preparatory School, and matriculated from Rondebosch Boys' High School in 1980 where he served as head boy. He then studied at Stellenbosch University and earned the degrees BA (Law) and Bachelor of Laws (LLB). He served on various student bodies, inter alia as vice-chairperson of the university's Students' Representative Council (SRC).

== Mayor of Swellendam ==
Myburgh is a fourth generation farmer on Vryheid farm near Swellendam. He joined the Democratic Alliance and was chosen as the party's mayoral candidate for the Swellendam Local Municipality ahead of the 2011 local government elections. No party won a majority seats on the municipal council and the DA then formed a coalition with the African Christian Democratic Party to govern the municipality. Myburgh was elected as Executive Mayor, succeeding Jan Jansen.

During his first term as mayor, the Swellendam Local Municipality won the Auditor-General's Special Award for Most Improved Municipality in the Western Cape in 2014 having earned an Unqualified Audit Report in the wake of three consecutive Disclaimers. The municipality received its first clean audit in 2014/15, and retained their Clean Audit status throughout Myburgh's tenure as Mayor. The municipality won the National Govan Mbeki Housing Award for the Best Upgrade of Informal Settlement Programme in South Africa in 2015. In 2016, the municipality was ranked by 'Good Governance Africa’ and the South African Institute of Race Relations as the country's Number 1 Municipality.

Prior to the 2016 Local Government Elections (LGE), Myburgh was selected to be the DA's mayoral candidate for Swellendam again. The DA won an outright majority on the council, the first time in the municipality's history that a single party had won a majority of seats on the council. Myburgh was re-elected as Executive Mayor.

Myburgh formerly served as chairman of the Swellendam Heritage Association and as the chairman of the DA's Swellendam Constituency Committee. He is also a former member of the DA's Provincial Executive Committee (PEC), the DA's Provincial Disciplinary Committee (PDC) as well as the Board of Trustees of the Drostdy Museum.

Myburgh resigned as Executive Mayor and as a Councillor on 7 September 2021 in order to take up a seat in Parliament. A member of the Mayoral Committee and the DA's mayoral candidate for the 2021 Local Government Elections Francois Du Rand was elected to replace him as mayor.

== Parliamentary career ==
Myburgh had stood unsuccessfully for election to the National Assembly in 2019. In September 2021, the DA announced that Myburgh would take up ex-DA MP Phumzile van Damme's seat in the National Assembly. He was sworn in on 8 September 2021, and serves on the Portfolio Committee for Water and Sanitation.

Myburgh delivered his Maiden Speech on Friday 13 May 2022 during a virtual session of Parliament. He pointed out that the looming water crisis in the country is potentially far more serious than the failure of Escom, the state-owned national electricity supply company. He said "the DA wants the Department of Water & Sanitation to succeed because we want South Africa to succeed!". He concluded his speech by saying that the best investment the government can make is to ensure that every household and business in the country has reliable access to potable water.

Myburgh was re-elected as a member of the National Assembly during the 2024 National and Provincial Elections. On 1 April 2025 he was sworn in as a member of the Joint Standing Committee on Intelligence (JSCI) which performs the oversight role in relation to the country's intelligence services.

== Personal life ==
Myburgh is married to Sally. They have two sons and two daughters.

Political offices
Preceded by Jan Jansen	Executive Mayor of the Swellendam Local Municipality; 2011–2021	Succeeded by Francois Du Rand
