= Allen Glen High School =

Public school in Roodepoort, Gauteng

Coordinates: 26.1207°S 27.9197°E

- Landhuis Street / Jim Fouche Drive, Roodepoort, Gauteng; South Africa

Information
- Type: Public, coeducational
- Motto: Confidence
- Established: 1992
- Locale: Urban
- Principal: M Gwala
- Grades: 8–12
- Enrollment: Approximately 1000, girls and boys.
- Colors: Gold and blue
- Website: Official website

Allen Glen High School is a co-educational public school that is located in Roodepoort, Gauteng.

== History ==
Allen Glen High School first opened its doors in 1992. Its name was inspired by the name of the suburb, Allens Nek. William Pope was elected as the schools' first headmaster, with 199 pupils. The first pupils wore t-shirts and jeans but have since changed and now wear official school uniform.

== Notable alumni ==
- Mmusi Maimane - Politician, former President of the Democratic Alliance (South Africa)
- Tansey Coetzee - Miss South Africa 2007 & model
- Thulisile Phongolo - Actress
