= John Steenhuisen =

South African politician (born 1976)

The Honourable John Steenhuisen MP
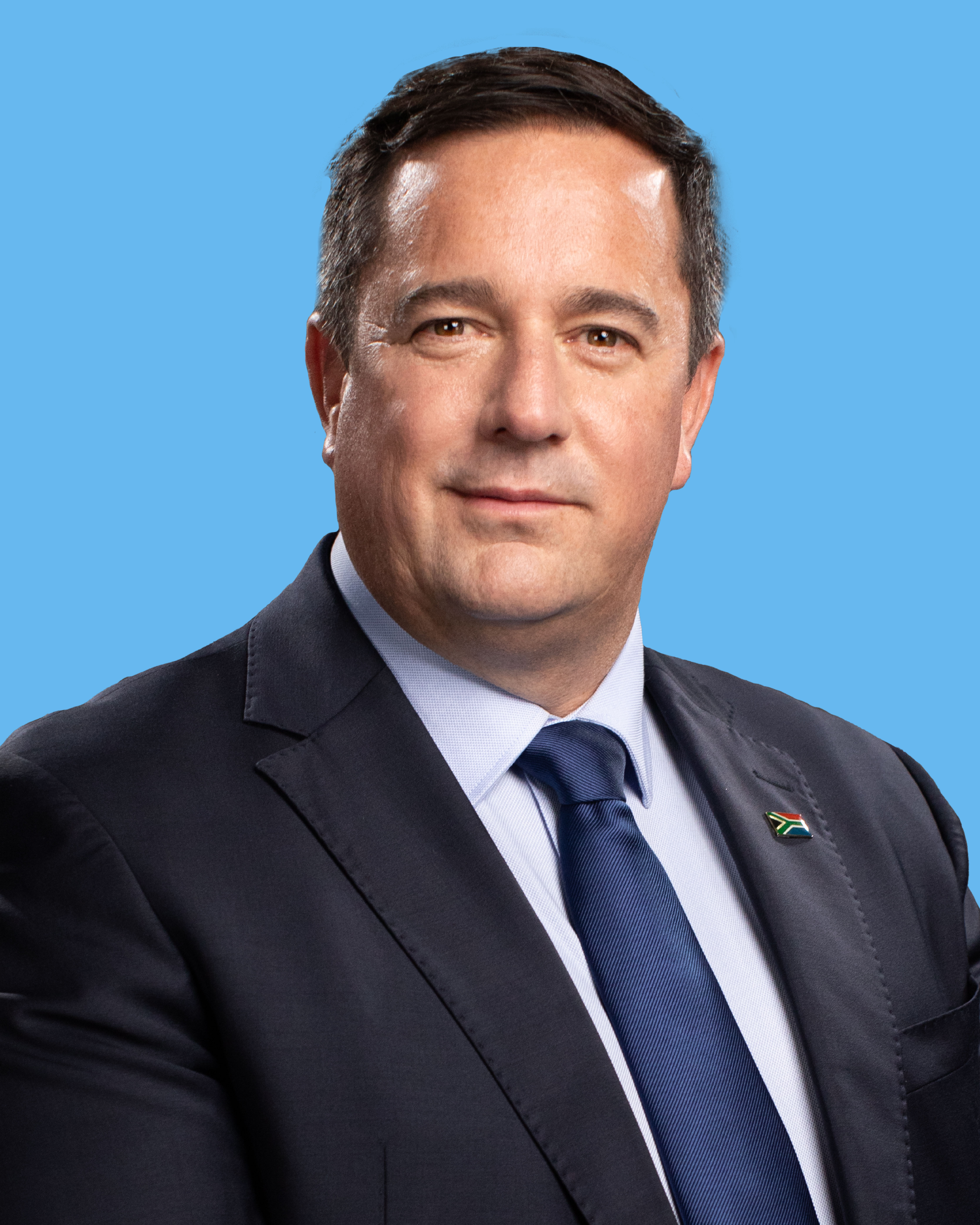
- Steenhuisen in 2024

Deputy Minister of Trade, Industry and Competition
- Incumbent
- Assumed office 1 July 2026
- President: Cyril Ramaphosa
- Preceded by: Alexandra Abrahams

Minister of Agriculture
- In office 3 July 2024 – 30 June 2026
- President: Cyril Ramaphosa
- Deputy: Rosemary Capa
- Preceded by: Thoko Didiza (Note: As Minister of Agriculture, Land Reform and Rural Development)
- Succeeded by: Willie Aucamp

Federal Leader of the Democratic Alliance
- In office 17 November 2019 (Note: Acting: 17 November 2019 – 1 November 2020) – 12 April 2026
- Deputy: Jacques Julius; Mike Waters
- Preceded by: Mmusi Maimane
- Succeeded by: Geordin Hill-Lewis

Leader of the Opposition
- In office 27 October 2019 – 14 June 2024
- Preceded by: Mmusi Maimane; Annelie Lotriet (acting)
- Succeeded by: John Hlophe

Chief Whip of the Official Opposition
- In office 29 May 2014 – 24 October 2019
- Leader: Mmusi Maimane
- Preceded by: Watty Watson
- Succeeded by: Jacques Julius (acting); Natasha Mazzone

Shadow Minister of Cooperative Governance and Traditional Affairs
- In office 1 February 2012 – 6 May 2014
- Leader: Lindiwe Mazibuko
- Preceded by: James Lorimer
- Succeeded by: Kevin Mileham

Member of the National Assembly of South Africa
- Incumbent
- Assumed office 19 July 2011
- Constituency: KwaZulu-Natal

Member of the KwaZulu-Natal Provincial Legislature
- In office 6 May 2009 – 19 July 2011

Personal details
- Born: John Henry Steenhuisen; 25 March 1976 (age 50) Durban, Natal, South Africa
- Party: Democratic Alliance (since 2000)
- Other political affiliations: Democratic Party (until 2000)
- Spouses: Julie Wright (m. 2000; div. 2010) Terry Beaumont (m. 2014)
- Children: 3
- Education: Northwood Boys High School
- Occupation: Politician

John Henry Steenhuisen (Note: Afrikaans pronunciation: [ˈdʒɔn ˈstiənˌɦœysən]) (born 25 March 1976) is a South African politician who is currently serving as the Deputy Minister of Trade, Industry and Competition since July 2026. He served as Minister of Agriculture from July 2024 to June 2026. He was the leader of the Democratic Alliance (DA) from November 2020 to April 2026, having served as the interim leader for one year from November 2019. He served as the leader of the Opposition from October 2019 to June 2024.

Born in Durban, he matriculated from Northwood Boys' High School. Steenhuisen joined the Democratic Party and was elected to the Durban City Council in 1999 as the councillor for Durban North. In 2000, the Democratic Alliance was formed, and he was elected as a councillor of the newly formed eThekwini Metropolitan Municipality in that year's municipal election. He was appointed as the DA's caucus leader in 2006.

After the 2009 elections, he became a member of the KwaZulu-Natal Legislature and was appointed the DA's caucus leader. Soon after, Steenhuisen was elected as the party's KwaZulu-Natal provincial leader, a position he held until he resigned in October 2010, amid an extramarital affair. He joined the National Assembly in July 2011, and he became the Shadow Minister of Co-operative Governance and Traditional Affairs in February 2012 following his appointment by Lindiwe Mazibuko.

In 2014, Steenhuisen was appointed Chief Whip of the Official Opposition by Mmusi Maimane, the newly elected DA Parliamentary Leader and Leader of the Official Opposition. He served as Chief Whip until October 2019, when Maimane resigned as the official opposition leader and party leader. Shortly afterwards, Steenhuisen was elected unopposed to replace him as the Leader of the Opposition. In November 2019, he was elected interim leader of the DA, after he defeated Makashule Gana, a DA MPL in Gauteng. A year later, he was elected leader for a full term at the party's Federal Congress, defeating Mbali Ntuli, a DA MPL from KwaZulu-Natal. He was re-elected to another term as party leader on 2 April 2023.

In the 2024 general election, the DA won 87 seats. As the ANC was denied a majority, the two parties and several smaller parties formed a national unity government, resulting with Cyril Ramaphosa being re-elected President of South Africa. Steenhuisen was subsequently appointed Minister of Agriculture.

On 4 February 2026, Steenhuisen announced he would soon be stepping down as Leader of the DA. Cape Town Mayor Geordin Hill-Lewis was elected to succeed Steenhuisen at the DA's Federal Congress in April 2026. On 17 June 2026, Hill-Lewis requested that Ramaphosa appoint Steenhuisen as the Deputy Minister of Trade, Industry and Competition. Ramaphosa acceded to Hill-Lewis's request on 30 June, moving Steenhuisen to the deputy minister role.

== Early life and education ==
John Henry Steenhuisen was born in Durban and matriculated from Northwood Boys' High School, an English-medium, ex-Model C high school in Durban in 1993. He does not have a university degree. He once told Parliament that he had enrolled for a bachelor's degree in politics and law at the University of South Africa in 1994, but he could not finish the course due to work and financial circumstances.

In November 2024, Steenhuisen announced that he would be registering to study at UNISA from 2025.

== Political career ==
Steenhuisen started as an ordinary Democratic Party (the predecessor to the Democratic Alliance) activist before he became a branch member.

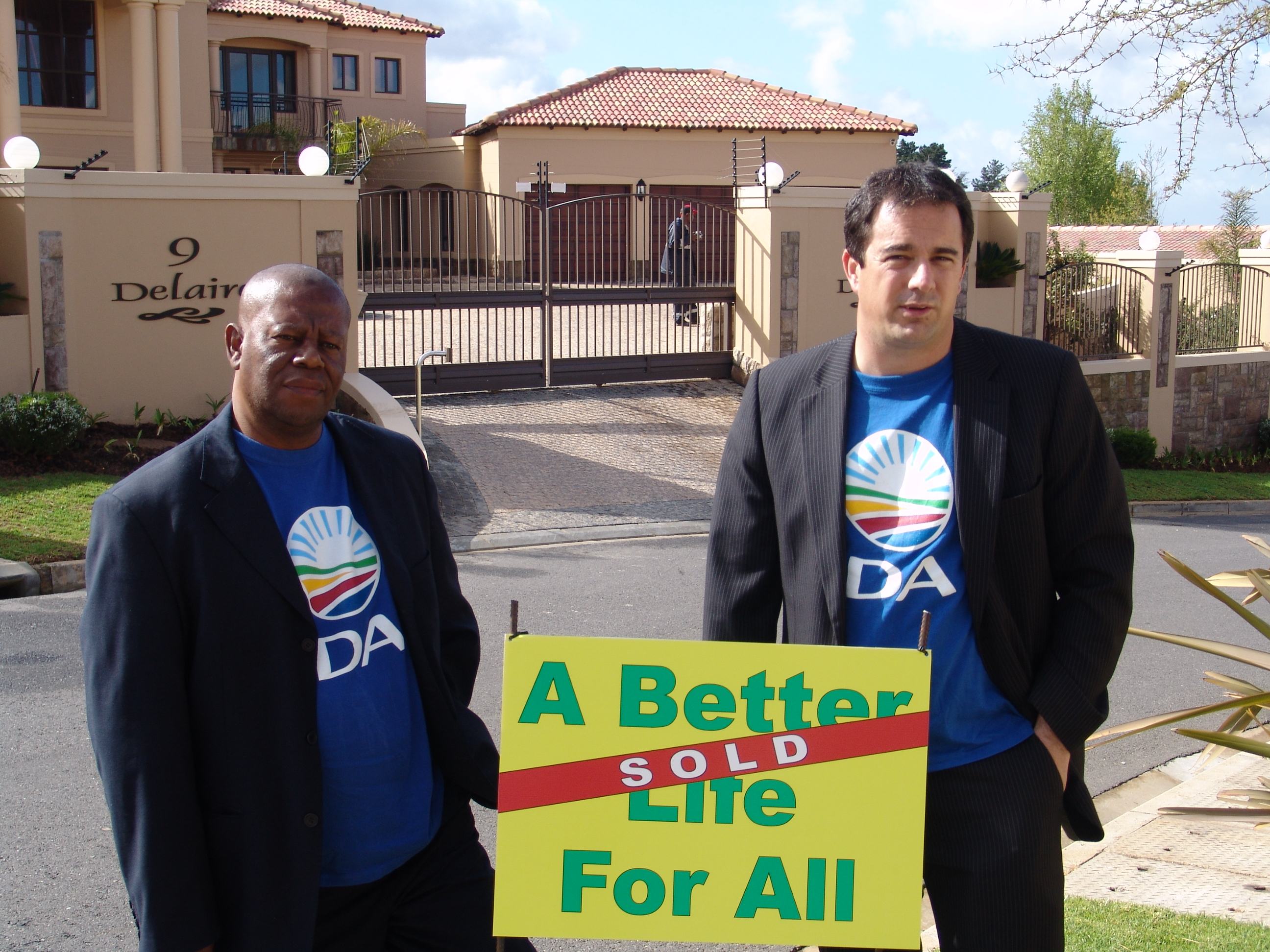
Winston Rabotapi and Steenhuisen in 2011

At the age of 22 in 1999, Steenhuisen was elected to the then Durban City Council as the DP councilor for Durban North. He was the youngest municipal councilor at that time. At the 2000 municipal election, the eThekwini Metropolitan Municipality was formed and Steenhuisen was elected as a councilor for the newly established DA. He continued to serve as an ordinary councilor until his appointment as the DA's caucus leader in 2006. In that same year, he was assigned to serve on the city's executive committee.

Steenhuisen was elected to the KwaZulu-Natal Legislature in the 2009 general election. The incoming DA caucus elected him as leader, replacing party veteran Roger Burrows. At the inaugural sitting, he challenged Zweli Mkhize of the African National Congress for the post of premier, but lost after he received only 7 votes compared to Mkhize's 68 votes.

He was elected as the KwaZulu-Natal provincial leader of the Democratic Alliance at the party's Provincial Congress held later that same year. Steenhuisen held this position until 24 October 2010, after he announced on 18 October his intention to resign amid the disclosure of an extramarital affair. Steenhuisen continued to serve as an MPL and the DA's caucus leader until his move to the National Assembly.

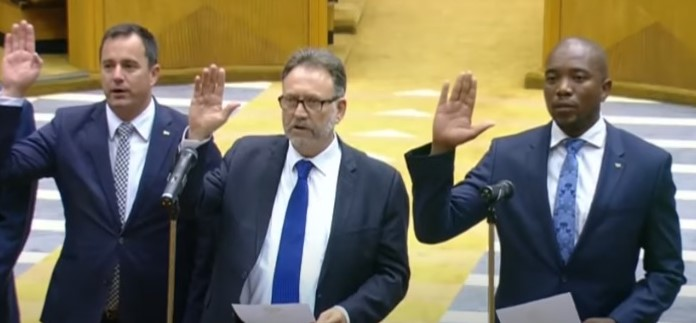
Steenhuisen (left), James Selfe (centre) and Mmusi Maimane (right) being sworn in to parliament on 22 May 2019.

Steenhuisen joined the National Assembly on 19 July 2011 by replacing Mark Steele, a DA MP who, in turn, assumed Steenhuisen's seat in the KwaZulu-Natal Legislature. In February 2012, Steenhuisen was appointed by Lindiwe Mazibuko as Shadow Minister of Co-operative Governance and Traditional Affairs. He served as a member of the Joint Standing Committee on the Financial Management and the Rules Committee.

In 2012, he declared his candidacy for deputy chairperson of the DA Federal Council. He lost to Thomas Walters at the party's Federal Congress.

Steenhuisen was appointed as chief whip of the DA parliamentary caucus by Mmusi Maimane on 29 May 2014. He was reappointed to the post in May 2019.

== Political positions and views ==
Steenhuisen is a conservative liberal who is fundamentally pro-business and has opposed race-based empowerment measures, favouring growth and jobs instead. He is the leader of the DA's centre-right faction.

== Leadership of the Democratic Alliance ==
=== Leadership elections ===
==== 2019 Interim leadership elections ====
Mmusi Maimane resigned as both Federal Leader and Parliamentary Leader of the DA in October 2019, causing Steenhuisen to lose the position of chief whip. Steenhuisen's deputy, Jacques Julius, then served as acting chief whip. Steenhuisen declared his candidacy to succeed Maimane as parliamentary leader and was elected unopposed on 27 October 2019. He formally announced on 28 October that he would run for federal leader of the party. He was elected interim leader of the party on 17 November, defeating Gauteng MPL Makashule Gana.

==== 2020 Federal Congress ====
On 15 February 2020, he declared his intention to seek a full-term as Federal Leader of the DA at the Hellenic Community Centre in Mouille Point, Cape Town. The party was scheduled to elect its new leadership at its Federal Congress in May 2020 but this was postponed due to the COVID-19 pandemic. Consequently, Steenhuisen suspended all campaign activities.

In May 2020, the DA's Federal Council, the second-highest decision-making body, resolved to hold the conference virtually between 31 October and 1 November, a move which some critics denounced as being favourable to Steenhuisen's campaign, as he has a public profile and access to party structures, giving him an advantage. He faced KwaZulu-Natal MPL Mbali Ntuli for the position. As the campaign progressed, he received endorsements from prominent party members, including Western Cape provincial leader Bonginkosi Madikizela and interim federal chairperson Ivan Meyer. On 1 November 2020, Steenhuisen was announced as the new leader of the party.

==== 2023 Federal Congress ====
On 1 November 2022, Steenhuisen announced his intention to seek re-election at the DA's Federal Congress in 2023. Steenhuisen launched his campaign for re-election on 19 November in Cape Town. He told supporters that while things had improved in the DA, there were still challenges. Steenhuisen also conceded that coalitions were difficult to manage as the party governs four out of the eight metropolitan municipalities and multiple municipalities across the country through coalition governments. Despite the party's ongoing exodus of black leaders and Federal Council Chairperson Helen Zille's strong influence in decision-making, Steenhuisen was considered by political analysts to easily win re-election at the Federal Congress. At the party's Federal Congress on 2 April 2023, it was announced that Steenhuisen had won a second term as party leader, defeating former Johannesburg mayor Mpho Phalatse.

=== Tenure ===
==== 2021 municipal elections ====
Steenhuisen led the Democratic Alliance into the 2021 national municipal elections. He said in an interview with News24 in September 2021: "The DA's core message in this election is not about the ANC. It's about the DA. We are going to be talking with South Africans about what we have to offer. Not just a critique of the ANC, but say, 'The DA gets things done'." On 25 September 2021, Steenhuisen released the DA's election manifesto. He said that the manifesto was a blueprint for “a local government that works".

Throughout the campaign, Steenhuisen warned that voting for smaller parties could aid and abet the ANC and EFF and said that some smaller parties were not interested in taking on the ANC, only the DA. The Inkatha Freedom Party (IFP) called the DA 'arrogant' over its election messages which discouraged voters from voting for smaller political parties. In early-October 2021, the DA put up controversial election placards in the majority Indian suburb of Phoenix in KwaZulu-Natal which read: "The ANC called you racists. The DA called you heroes." During the riots and looting that affected the province in July 2021, residents of Phoenix formed armed citizen vigilantes to protect the community due to the lack of police response. Violent clashes occurred between residents and black people from close townships like Inanda resulted in the deaths of 36 people and increased racial tensions between Black and Indian South Africans. The posters were denounced by several political parties and the DA was accused of exploiting fear and deepening divisions for electoral gain. Steenhuisen defended the posters and said that the party would not apologise for putting them up. The party later apologised for the posters and began removing them.

In the municipal elections of 1 November 2021, the DA's electoral support declined. The party had won 1,396 municipal seats, outright control of 11 municipalities and was the leading party in 23 municipalities. The party had lost 386 seats and outright control of 8 municipalities. Despite the party's decline, the party did win control of the uMngeni Local Municipality in KwaZulu-Natal, making it the first DA-run municipality in the province. In several municipalities and large metropolitan municipalities, no party won an outright majority. The party then held coalition discussions with ActionSA, the Freedom Front Plus, the African Christian Democratic Party and several other political parties. Coalition talks nearly collapsed after the party refused to vote for Herman Mashaba, former DA mayor of Johannesburg and ActionSA president, to become mayor of Johannesburg again. On 22 November 2021, the DA gained back control of the City of Johannesburg and gained control of the City of Ekurhuleni for the first time after ActionSA president Mashaba convinced the Economic Freedom Fighters leadership to vote for the DA mayoral candidates. Coalition talks then resumed and the DA and its coalition partners signed an agreement to govern several municipalities on 16 December 2021.

==== Internal party affairs ====
In the early days of Steenhuisen's leadership, he appointed Natasha Mazzone as the new chief whip of the DA parliamentary caucus on 31 October 2019. The party lost control of the City of Johannesburg Metropolitan Municipality in December 2019. In August 2016, then-DA leader Maimane formed an informal alliance with the Economic Freedom Fighters to secure control of several hung municipalities, including Johannesburg with Herman Mashaba of the DA as the city's mayor. Mashaba resigned as mayor in October 2019 and left office in November. A vacancy was therefore created. DA Federal Council Chairwoman Helen Zille and Steenhuisen both opposed a coalition agreement with the EFF. On 4 December, the ANC regained control of the City of Johannesburg. Previous DA coalition partners and a few DA councillors voted for the ANC candidate, Geoff Makhubo.

On 5 December 2020, Steenhuisen announced his Shadow Cabinet. The majority of the positions remained unchanged, with Geordin Hill-Lewis remaining at Finance, Andrew Whitfield at Police and Siviwe Gwarube at Health. He removed Phumzile van Damme as Shadow Minister of Communications and replaced her with Zakhele Mbhele. He also granted Van Damme a health-related sabbatical until March 2021. She subsequently accused Steenhuisen of trying to use her health sideline her. It was claimed that she was being sidelined because she had not supported Steenhuisen candidature as leader of the party The DA disputed Van Damme's accusation, but she vehemently insisted that Steenhuisen had instructed her to cease all her parliamentary duties and go on an unsolicited sabbatical. Steenhuisen then claimed he had made the sabbatical optional and Van Damme could continue with her parliamentary duties. On 12 February 2021, Van Damme announced that her disagreement with Steenhuisen regarding her sabbatical had been resolved and she would return to work, focusing on digital technologies. She later resigned as a DA MP in May 2021, citing a clique of individuals.

On 18 August 2022, Steenhuisen conducted a reshuffle of his shadow cabinet. He promoted the deputy chief whip of the DA parliamentary caucus Siviwe Gwarube to chief whip of the DA caucus, while former chief whip Natasha Mazzone was appointed the National Security Advisor to Steenhuisen. Veteran DA MP Dianne Kohler Barnard was appointed Shadow Minister of Communications, while Phineas Masipa was appointed Shadow Minister of Agriculture, Land Reform and Rural Development. Solly Malatsi had been re-appointed by Steenhuisen as the party spokesperson after he resigned back in November 2020. Steenhuisen had been under pressure to remove Mazzone as chief whip by DA MPs. In April 2022, The Sunday Times reported that several senior members of the DA caucus, including Steenhuisen himself, disapproved of Mazzone's performance.

==== 2022 visit to Ukraine ====
In April 2022, John Steenhuisen went on a six-day 'fact-finding' trip to Ukraine. His trip has been criticized, by many who said that he should focus on local South African issues. In response, Steenhuisen stated that 'The criticism for visiting Ukraine is not fair and is immature'. After initially declining to reveal the trip's funders, Steenhuisen later revealed that trip was funded by the Brenthurst Foundation. Following the trip Steenhuisen held a brief press conference, which did not allow for questions from the press.

==== COVID-19 pandemic ====
During the COVID-19 pandemic, the DA launched a coronavirus information channel. On 8 May 2020, Steenhuisen delivered a speech in which he called for the national lockdown to be ended. Steenhuisen called the lockdown “destructive” and said, “there is no longer a justification to keep this hard lockdown in place.” He also said that the DA had written to the International Monetary Fund and filed a PAIA complaint to obtain the minutes of the National Command Council's decision to retain the tobacco ban.

==== 2024 general election ====
The 2024 general election saw the DA win 87 seats. Their chief rival, the ruling ANC, lost their majority for the first time in South Africa's democratic history. Before the election in August 2023, the DA and several parties signed the Multi-Party Charter, which stipulated that no signatory would work with the ANC. Steenhuisen said that the results showed that South Africa was "heading into coalition country" and expressed a willingness to work alongside the ANC, adding that he would have to first consult with other signatories of the Multi-Party Charter. The DA also said that a government composed of the ANC, the MK, and the EFF would be a "doomsday coalition" pursuing previous policy failures in the country. Steenhusen objected when the SABC banned a controversial flag-burning advert by DA.

On 5 June, the ANC formally announced that it was seeking to create a national unity government. On 13 June, the ANC announced that the DA and several other parties had agreed on the “fundamental” principle of forming the national unity government, with a framework to be disclosed on 14 June. That day, Steenhuisen announced that the DA had entered into a coalition agreement with the ANC and provided its support for Cyril Ramaphosa's reelection as president. At Ramaphosa's inauguration, he said he would focus on the composition of the cabinet before considering a possible role as Deputy President.

==== Tensions with Dion George ====
On 7 November 2025, Steenhuisen wrote to Ramaphosa requesting that he remove DA Federal Finance Chairperson Dion George as the Minister of Forestry, Fisheries and the Environment and replace him with Willie Aucamp, one of the DA's national spokespeople. George only learned about his dismissal through media reports as he was in Brazil attending COP30. Aucamp was sworn into office on 17 November.

On 18 November 2025, Daily Maverick published an exposé that Steenhuisen had a default judgment granted against him in the Cape Town Magistrates Court in May 2025 for unpaid personal credit card debt of almost R150,000. Steenhuisen's party credit card had allegedly been revoked by the party's Federal Finance Committee in March 2025 over concerns that the debt could not be reconciled. While Steenhuisen acknowledged that he had returned the credit card, he claimed that he took the decision to do so, which was denied by George, who said that he had taken the decision to revoke Steenhuisen's access to the credit card. Amid Steenhuisen's and George's public fallout, which included allegations of misconduct, financial mismanagement of party resources, and the use of "smear campaigns", the DA instructed its Federal Legal Commission on 24 November 2025 to investigate the allegations made against Steenhuisen and George.

In early-January 2026, George took the unprecedented step of reporting Steenhuisen to the Public Protector on allegations that he had abused his role and unlawfully interfered in the operations of the Department of Forestry, Fisheries and the Environment. On 12 January 2026, the DA's Federal Executive met and adopted the report into the preliminary investigation conducted by the FLC on whether Steenhuisen had abused his party-issued credit card. The report cleared Steenhuisen by finding that the expenditure on the credit card had been fully reconciled and that there was no prima facie evidence that Steenhuisen had abused party funds. The Federal Executive did, however, resolve to investigate if the actions by Steenhuisen and George had brought the party into disrepute. George resigned from the DA on 15 January, accusing the DA under Steenhuisen of having been "captured" by the African National Congress, the DA's coalition partner in the Government of National Unity.

==== Retirement as party leader ====
On 3 February 2026, multiple media outlets reported that Steenhuisen would be imminently announcing that he would not stand for re-election as party leader at the party's upcoming Federal Congress to be held later on in the year, despite having publicly said that he would. Steenhuisen announced during a press conference held in Durban the following day that he would not be standing for re-election, saying "mission accomplished" and that he had "loved leading the DA." He also said that he would remain as Minister of Agriculture and that he would continue leading the government's response to the foot-and-mouth disease outbreak, for which he has been criticised by farmers and civil society. On 11 April 2026, Steenhuisen delivered his final speech as party leader at the DA's Federal Congress. Cape Town Mayor Geordin Hill-Lewis was elected to succeed him the following day.

== National government ==
=== Minister of Agriculture: 2024–2026 ===
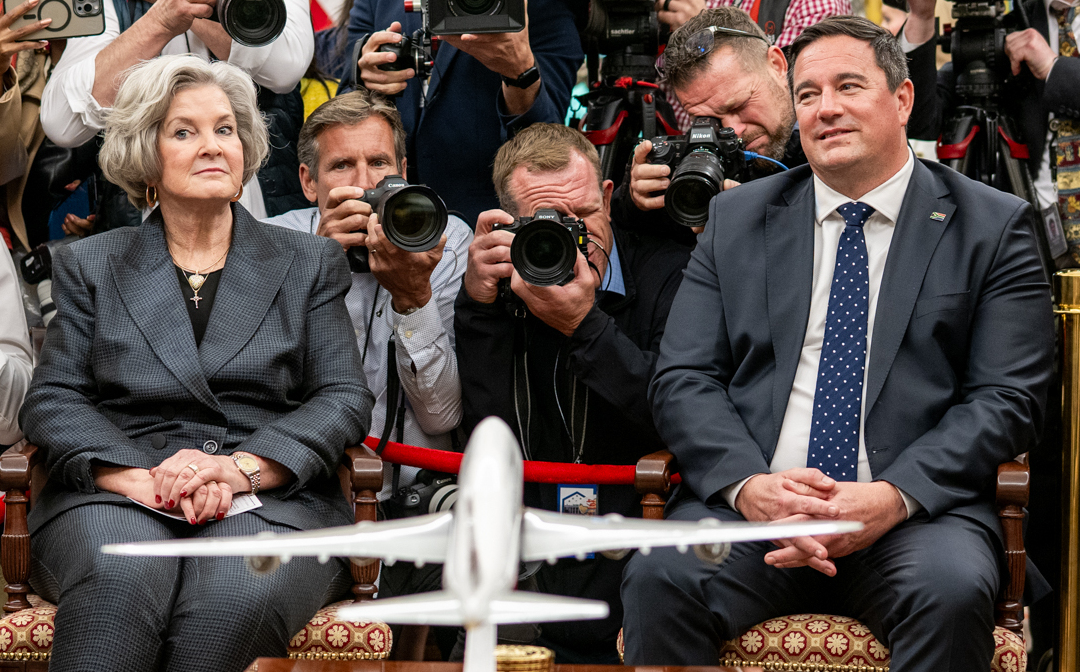
Steenhuisen sitting next to the White House Chief of Staff Susie Wiles in the Oval Office during Cyril Ramaphosa's meeting with U.S. President Donald Trump on 21 May 2025

Steenhuisen was appointed as the Minister of Agriculture in Ramaphosa's cabinet on 3 July 2024, as part of the coalition government. The DA received 6 out of 32 cabinet posts in the new government. In his maiden speech as Minister delivered on 16 July, Steenhuisen promised to modernize the farming sector, which included introducing a track-and-trace system for livestock. He also said he would continue projects started before the election and focus on sustainability for rural areas and food security. Additionally, Steenhuisen said he would try to settle South Africa's citrus dispute with the European Union and maintain South Africa's part in the United States' African Growth and Opportunity Act.

In May 2025, Steenhuisen was a member of Ramaphosa's delegation to the White House, where he met with United States president Donald Trump to dispel the conspiracy theory of a white genocide in South Africa. After Trump played footage of opposition leader Julius Malema singing the controversial Kill The Boer anti-apartheid song, Steenhuisen told Trump that Malema's party was not part of the coalition government, and that the reason the DA joined the ANC in forming a coalition government was to prevent the Economic Freedom Fighters and uMkhonto weSizwe from entering national government.

President Ramaphosa sacked DA member Andrew Whitfield as Deputy Minister of Trade and Industry on 26 June 2025, the official reason being an unauthorised trip to Washington D.C. for which Whitfield never received permission. Steenhuisen claimed that Whitfield was "fired for fighting corruption, not committing corruption", and warned that "if this isn't corrected it will go down as the biggest mistake in South Africa’s political history." Steenhuisen issued a 48-hour ultimatum to Ramaphosa, pressing him to fire several ANC cabinet ministers and deputy ministers accused of corruption. After the 48 hours lapsed and Ramaphosa did not remove the corruption accused cabinet members, Steenhuisen announced during a press conference on 28 June that the DA would not be participating in the government's National Dialogue Initiative, which he called a "waste of time and money."

=== Deputy Minister of Trade, Industry and Competition: 2026–present ===
On 17 June 2026, Hill-Lewis wrote to Ramaphosa requesting that he appoint Steenhuisen as the Deputy Minister of Trade, Industry and Competition and that the Forestry, Fisheries and the Environment Minister Willie Aucamp succeed Steenhuisen as the Minister of Agriculture. Steenhuisen had been heavily criticised for his handling of the food-and-mouth disease outbreak in South Africa by farmers and agricultural organisations.

In an interview with News24 editor-in-chief Adriaan Basson on 28 June 2026, Steenhuisen shared his view on the reshuffle, calling it "a demotion, plain and simple." and accused Hill-Lewis of betraying him, which Hill-Lewis has subsequently denied. Steenhuisen claimed that he was promised that he would retain his ministerial position, if he would step down as DA leader. In the interview, Steenhuisen questioned the motives of the conservative groups that targeted him as Minister and voiced his concern that a faction within the DA was attempting to appease a white conservative demographic. He further alleged that Resolve Communications, a public relations company led by former DA leader Tony Leon, of orchestrating a campaign against him and his chief of staff Jana Le Roux.

On 30 June 2026, Ramaphosa acceded to Hill-Lewis's request and moved Steenhuisen to the deputy ministerial role, ending his tenure as Minister of Agriculture. Steenhuisen was sworn in as Deputy Minister the following day.

== Personal life ==
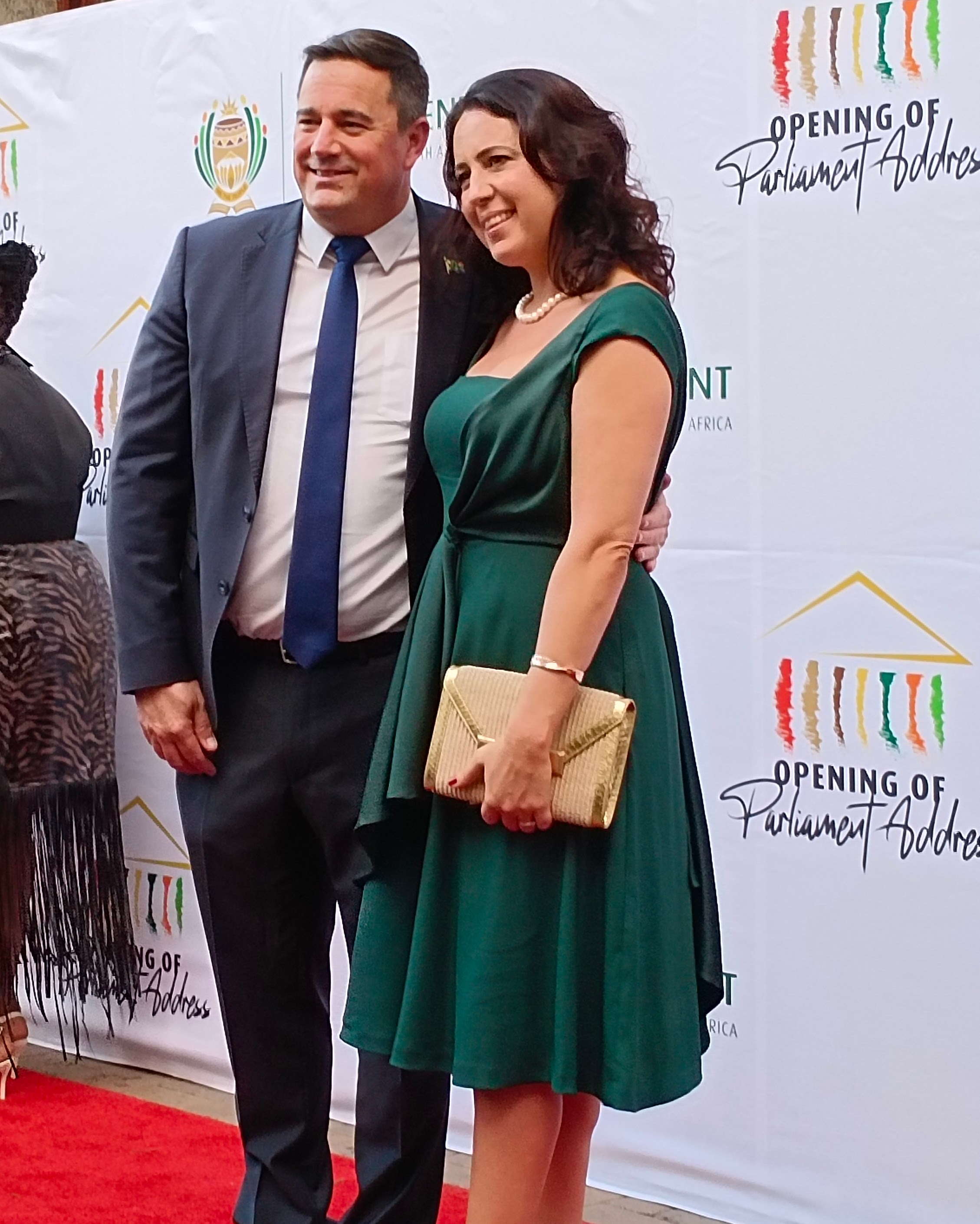
John Steenhuisen and Terry Steenhuisen on the red carpet posing for cameras, prior to the Opening of Parliament Address 2024

He currently resides in uMhlanga, (an upmarket coastal town in KwaZulu Natal) and is a supporter of the Sharks rugby union team and the AmaZulu F.C. soccer club.

Steenhuisen was married for 10 years to Julie Steenhuisen (née Wright), a fellow Durban native. They were divorced in October 2010 amid Steenhuisen's alleged affair with Terry Beaumont, the wife of the DA's former KwaZulu-Natal director Michael Beaumont. Steenhuisen has two daughters from his first marriage. He is now married to Terry, and they have a daughter together.

He is fluent in both English and Afrikaans.

== Notes ==
Party political offices
Preceded by Mmusi Maimane	Federal Leader of the Democratic Alliance; 2019–2026	Succeeded by Geordin Hill-Lewis
Political offices
Preceded by Mmusi Maimane	Leader of the Opposition in the National Assembly of South Africa; 2019–2024	Succeeded by John Hlophe
Preceded by Watty Watson	Chief Whip of the Official Opposition in the National Assembly of South Africa; 2014–2019	Succeeded by Jacques Julius (acting); Natasha Mazzone
