= Official Opposition Shadow Cabinet (South Africa) =

Shadow cabinet of South Africa

South Africa's Official Opposition Shadow Cabinet (Tswana: kabinetemaitlhomo; Sotho: sekabinete; Northern Sotho: kabinete ya lekgotlakganetšo; Afrikaans: skadukabinet; Zulu: izingqapheli zesigungu sesishayamthetho; Southern Ndebele: ikhabinethi elingisako; Xhosa: ikhabhinethi yeqela eliphikisayo; Swazi: ikhabhinethi lelindzele; Tsonga: khabinete yo xopela; Venda: khabinethe yo dzumbamaho) consists of Members of the National Assembly who scrutinise their corresponding office holders in the executive branch of government and develop alternative policies for their respective portfolios. The Democratic Alliance (DA) retained their position as official opposition in the 2019 general election and Mmusi Maimane announced his shadow cabinet on 5 June 2019.

Mmusi Maimane resigned as Leader of the Opposition in October 2019. John Steenhuisen was elected as his successor and leads the Official Opposition Shadow Cabinet. Appointed alongside Steenhuisen was Natasha Mazzone, as Chief Whip, and Annelie Lotriet as Chairperson of the Caucus. Steenhuisen announced his shadow cabinet on 5 December 2020.

Following the national election in May 2024, the ANC lost its outright majority for the first time in South Africa's democratic history. The Democratic Alliance (DA) entered the government, the ANC-led coalition of national unity (Third Cabinet of Cyril Ramaphosa), for the first time. The new UMkhonto we Sizwe (MK) party, the third biggest political party in the parliament after the ANC and the DA, became the official opposition.

== Other shadow cabinets ==
- Shadow Cabinet of Mmusi Maimane (2014–2019)
- Shadow Cabinet of Lindiwe Mazibuko (2011–2014)
- Shadow Cabinet of Athol Trollip (2009–2011)
- Shadow Cabinet of Sandra Botha (2007–2009)
- Shadow Cabinet of Tony Leon
