= Mmusi Maimane =

South African politician (born 1980)

The Honourable Mmusi Maimane
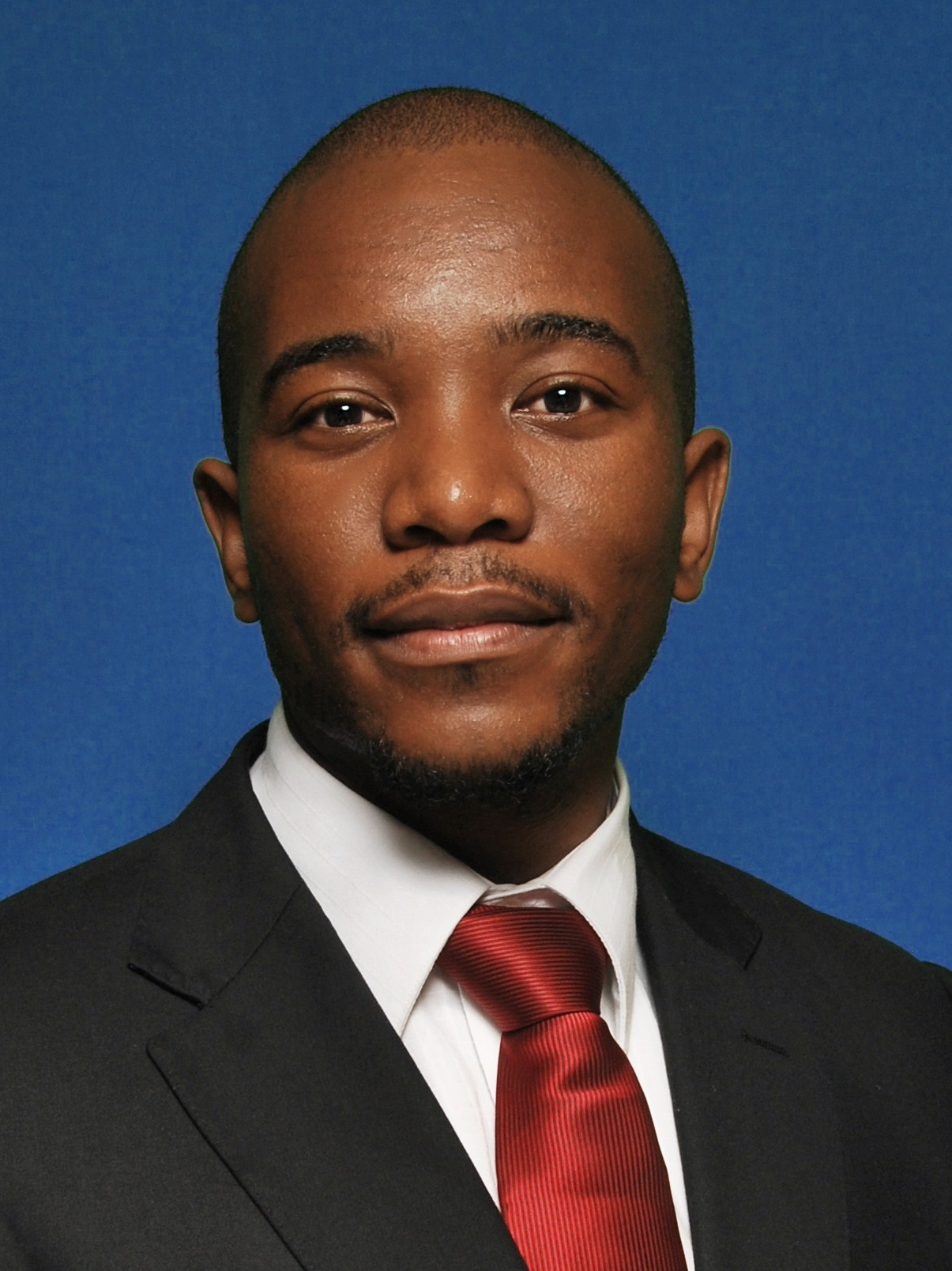
- Maimane in 2011

Leader of the Opposition
- In office 29 May 2014 – 24 October 2019
- President: Jacob Zuma; Cyril Ramaphosa
- Preceded by: Lindiwe Mazibuko
- Succeeded by: John Steenhuisen

Federal Leader of the Democratic Alliance
- In office 10 May 2015 – 23 October 2019
- Chair: Athol Trollip
- Preceded by: Helen Zille
- Succeeded by: John Steenhuisen

Member of the National Assembly of South Africa
- Incumbent
- Assumed office 14 June 2024
- Constituency: National
- In office 21 May 2014 – 24 October 2019
- Constituency: Gauteng

National Spokesperson of the Democratic Alliance
- In office November 2011 – 6 May 2014
- Preceded by: Lindiwe Mazibuko
- Succeeded by: Marius Redelinghuys; Phumzile van Damme

Leader of Build One South Africa
- Incumbent
- Assumed office 24 September 2022
- Deputy: Nobuntu Hlazo-Webster
- Preceded by: Position established

Personal details
- Born: Mmusi Aloysias Maimane; 6 June 1980 (age 46) Krugersdorp, Transvaal Province, South Africa
- Party: Build One South Africa (2022–present); Independent (2019–2022); Democratic Alliance (2009–2019); African National Congress (until 2009)
- Other political affiliations: One South Africa Movement (2020–present)
- Spouse: Natalie Maimane (m. 2005)
- Children: 3
- Education: Allen Glen High School
- Alma mater: University of the Witwatersrand (BA); University of South Africa (MPA); Bangor University (ThM); University of Johannesburg (PhD)
- Occupation: Politician; educator; pastor; spokesperson; civic activist
- Website: Official website

Mmusi Aloysias Maimane (born 6 June 1980) is a South African politician, businessman, and leader of Build One South Africa, a political party. Maimane was the leader of South Africa's opposition Democratic Alliance (DA) political party from 10 May 2015 to 23 October 2019, and the former Leader of the Opposition in the National Assembly of South Africa from 29 May 2014 to 24 October 2019. He became the first black South African to lead the DA.

Maimane is the former leader of the DA in the Johannesburg City Council and the DA National Spokesperson. In 2011, he was elected to be the DA's Johannesburg mayoral candidate in the 2011 municipal elections. In that election, Maimane helped to grow the party's voter base, but was not elected mayor. Thereafter he served as Leader of the Official Opposition on the Johannesburg City Council until May 2014. In addition to his political career, he is also a pastor and elder at Liberty Church. He formed the One South Africa Movement in 2020. Mmusi Maimane launched his new political party, Build One South Africa on 24 September 2022.

== Early life and education ==
Maimane was born on 6 June 1980 in the Leratong Hospital in Krugersdorp. His mother, Ethel Maimane, grew up in Cofimvaba in the Eastern Cape, and is of Xhosa ancestry in the Sidloyi clan. His father, Simon Maimane, was born in Soweto, and is of Tswana ancestry in the Bafokeng clan. His parents met in 1977 and were married by 1980 in Dobsonville, Soweto.

Maimane grew up in Soweto, and attended Raucall and then Allen Glen High School, where he matriculated in 1997. Maimane graduated from the University of South Africa with a BA in Psychology, the University of the Witwatersrand with a Masters in Public Administration, and Bangor University in Wales with a Masters in Theology. In 2025, he graduated from the University of Johannesburg with a Doctor of Philosophy in Public Management and Governance.

== Early career ==
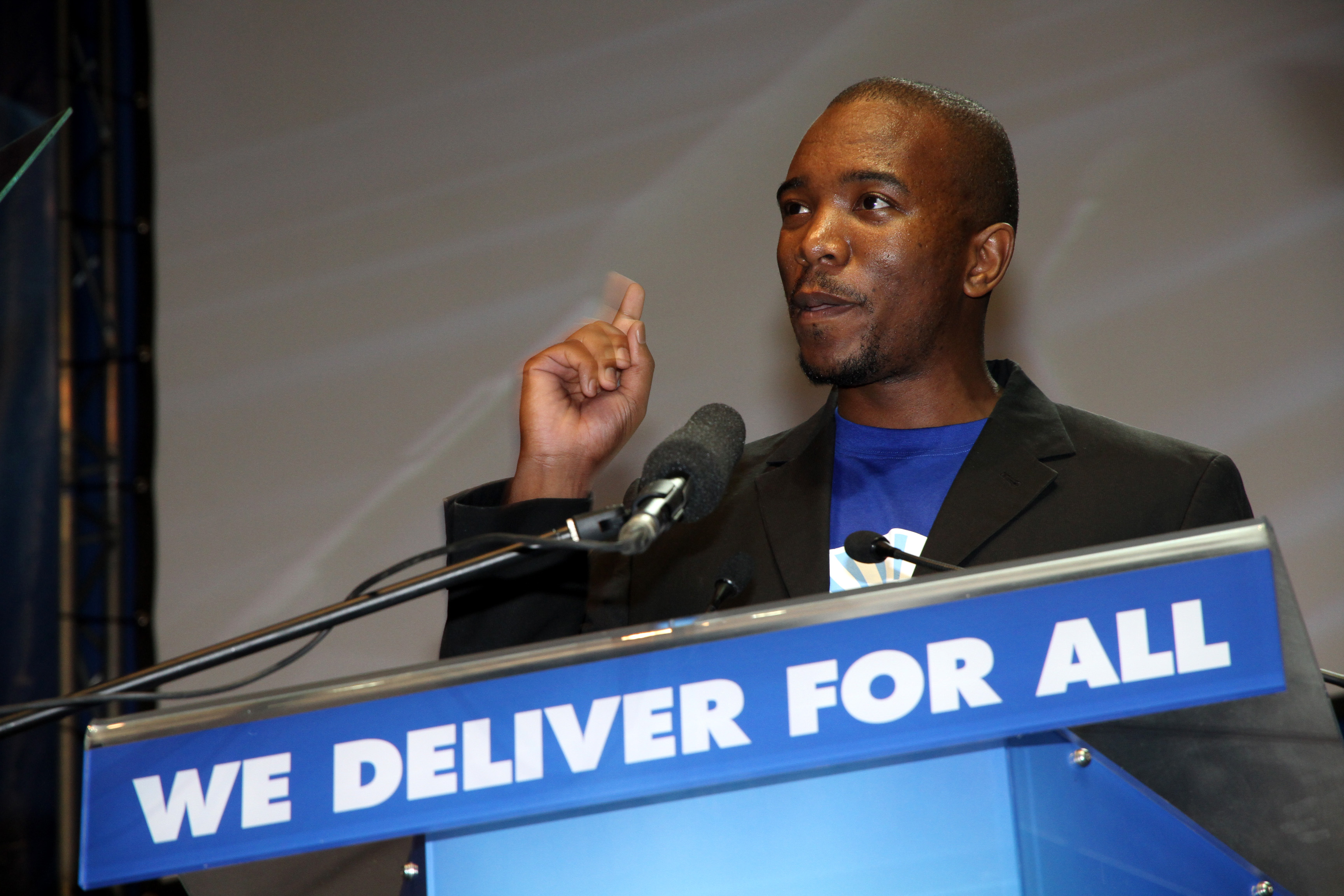
Maimane, as mayoral candidate, delivering a speech in March 2011

In 2010, Maimane applied to run as a DA candidate for Johannesburg City Council and also for internal election as the DA candidate for Mayor of Johannesburg. In March 2011, his mayoral candidacy was announced at the DA Election Manifesto Launch at Walter Sisulu Square in Soweto. He defeated contender Vasco da Gama to be elected as the DA mayoral candidate for Johannesburg before a panel of 30 people, including party leader and Premier of the Western Cape Helen Zille.

The DA achieved 34.6% of the vote in the 2011 local government elections in Johannesburg, with 752,304 votes. He led a caucus of 90 members of the 260 seats in Johannesburg City Council. The mayoral seat was won by the ANC and Maimane therefore took up the position of Leader of the Official Opposition. In the council, Maimane served on the Finance Committee, and on the Governance Committee that he had personally pushed to have constituted. He was selected as DA national spokesperson later in 2011.

At the 2012 DA Federal Congress, Maimane was elected as the party's deputy federal chairperson, ahead of eight other candidates.

== Legislative career ==
=== 2014 Gauteng Premier campaign ===
On 31 July 2013, Maimane announced his intention to run for the DA nomination as a candidate for Premier of Gauteng in the 2014 elections at Baliskis in Alexandra. Two opponents joined the internal race: DA Gauteng Health spokesperson Jack Bloom and unknown outsider Vaughan Reineke. He emerged as the duly elected DA Gauteng Premier candidate on 9 August 2013. On 12 September, Maimane made the first public address of his candidacy on the lawns of the Union Buildings in Pretoria.

In a March 2014 Ipsos poll, Gauteng respondents were asked to rate Maimane from 1 to 10 (with 1 being "totally against" and 10 being "totally in favour"); the result was an average of 4.9. Among only DA voters, just 8% rated him between 8 and 10. In the other direction, 27% of Gauteng residents rated him between 0 and 2 or "totally against".

Ahead of the 2014 national elections, Mmusi appeared in a political advert titled "Ayisafani" which suggested that the ANC, under the leadership of Jacob Zuma, had fallen from grace. The advert was banned by the South African Broadcasting Corporation (SABC) after it was aired on April 8 and 9, on the basis that the advert incited violence. The DA laid a complaint with the Independent Communications Authority of South Africa (ICASA), and a public hearing was held. The DA and SABC came to an agreement on April 16, after which the broadcaster again aired the advert. While the DA grew its share of the vote in Gauteng in the 2014 election, the ANC retained control of the province with Maimane losing to David Makhura. Following this, Maimane opted against serving in the provincial legislature and was instead sworn in as a member of the National Assembly of South Africa.

=== National Assembly ===
The DA's parliamentary caucus met on 29 May 2014 to decide on new parliamentary leadership. Maimane was the only candidate for the post of Leader of the Opposition in the National Assembly and was elected unopposed, becoming the first black man to hold the position in South Africa's history. On 5 June 2014, Maimane announced his Shadow Cabinet.

== Leadership of the Democratic Alliance (2015–2019) ==
=== Leadership election ===
On 18 April 2015, at the DA Western Cape Congress, Maimane announced that he would run for federal leader of the DA. He was backed by prominent businessman Herman Mashaba and on 10 May 2015, Maimane was elected leader of the DA at the party's 2015 federal congress in Port Elizabeth. In the process he defeated party chairperson Wilmot James with close to 90% of the vote.

=== Dianne Kohler Barnard controversy ===
In early October 2015, DA Shadow Minister of Police Dianne Kohler Barnard faced internal DA disciplinary action after controversially sharing on her Facebook page a post from someone else suggesting that life in South Africa was better under former apartheid president P. W. Botha. She subsequently deleted the post, with the first instruction to do so apparently coming from former DA leader Zille. Kohler Barnard apologised unreservedly for her action, and Maimane subsequently demoted her to the position of shadow Deputy Minister of Public Works in a wider shadow cabinet reshuffle. Kohler Barnard stated that she was considering her position, while Maimane came under pressure to expel her from the DA, and his leadership was called into question. The controversy damaged the DA's relations with the Congress of the People (COPE, a political party smaller than the DA), with COPE stating that "how and to what extent the DA distances itself from that will determine how and to what extent we as a party can co-operate with the DA in the future."

Later that month, the Federal Executive (Fedex) of the DA decided to expel Kohler Barnard from the party, although the decision was subsequently reversed on appeal. Maimane argued that action against Kohler Barnard would have implications for perceptions of the DA amongst black voters. According to Fedex chairman James Selfe, the affair caused "massive damage" to the DA and would likely hurt them in the polls. Maimane appeared increasingly weak in his responses to and management of the affair, whose fall-out threatened his leadership of the DA.

=== Helen Zille colonialism controversy ===
In March 2017, former DA leader Helen Zille argued in a series of tweets that some elements of South Africa's colonial legacy made a positive contribution to the country. Zille subsequently apologised in light of the outrage generated, and Maimane referred the matter to a DA disciplinary process. Various commentators called on Zille to resign or be fired as Premier of the Western Cape. Maimane later admitted in June 2018 to difficulties in his relationship with Zille, as a result of her continued role as Premier of the Western Cape after he became party leader.

=== Other activities ===
In October 2015, Maimane was booed and chased from the University of Cape Town campus when he tried to address students protesting against fee increases, and was subsequently criticised by younger members of his own party for failing to show sufficient solidarity with students protesting over the increases. Maimane also became embroiled in a controversy around declaration of interests as one of a number of MPs who failed to declare campaign contributions.

In January 2016, Maimane set out a new stance for the DA on the issue of racism, in which he called on racists not to vote for the DA, and spelt out a charter on racism that all new DA members would have to commit to upon joining the party. He also announced that the DA would introduce equity targets when the DA selects candidates for public office in order to make the party more diverse and reflective of the country as a whole.

In January 2017, Maimane made a visit to Israel, causing some controversy. On 5 October 2017, Maimane and Johannesburg mayor Herman Mashaba led a march towards the Gupta family's South African home in Saxonwold against allegations of state capture. Maimane received criticism from various quarters for demonstrating at the home, despite having previously spoken out against demonstrations at private homes.

In April 2018, the DA adopted a proposal from Maimane to include a clause on diversity in its constitution, though the wording on Maimane's original version was amended based on suggestions by MPs Michael Cardo and Gavin Davis. Among the suggested changes included an explicit rejection of race-based quotas, arguing instead for "diversity of thought".

In September 2018, reports speculated that Maimane would run for the DA nomination as a candidate for Premier of the Western Cape in the 2019 elections. Maimane's spokesperson Portia Adams said that Maimane was "discussing the candidacy with party structures" and that no final decision had been reached on the matter. On 18 September, the DA announced that Maimane "decided to decline the request for him to stand as the DA’s candidate for Premier of the Western Cape"; Maimane announced Alan Winde as the party's candidate in a press conference the following day.

=== 2019 general elections and decline in the Democratic Alliance vote ===
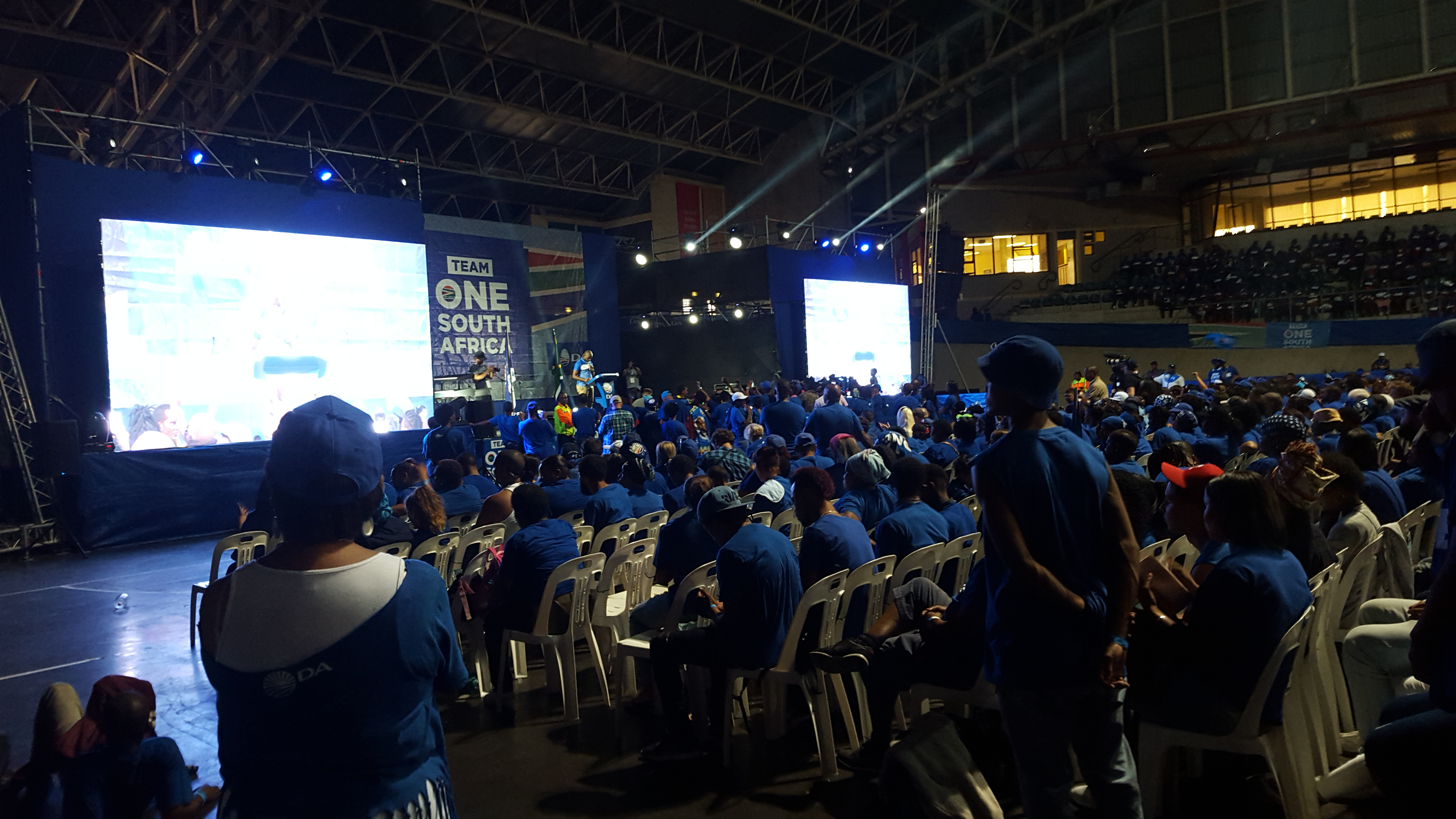
Mmusi Maimane delivering a speech at the DA Provincial Manifesto launch in the Western Cape, March 2019

The 2019 general elections presented Maimane with his first general election contest as party leader of the DA. Opinion polls published prior to election day suggested the DA would lose support. Party officials discredited these polls and claimed that the party's own internal polls suggested electoral growth. The party's election campaign was hurt by several controversies.

On 8 May 2019, the DA faced its first general election decline in its history. Analysts suggested the decline was caused by Maimane's weak leadership. The party stagnated in some areas, while it shed support to the conservative Freedom Front Plus (FF+) in other areas. In the National Assembly, the party lost five parliamentary seats. In KwaZulu-Natal and Mpumalanga, it lost the title of official opposition to the Inkatha Freedom Party (IFP) and Economic Freedom Fighters (EFF), respectively. The DA underperformed and lost support in Gauteng, a province that the party was expected to gain control of through a coalition government. The DA declined in its traditional stronghold of the Western Cape. Despite the decline at national level and in some provinces, the party did manage to grow in the Free State, Northern Cape and KwaZulu-Natal, earning one seat more in each of the respective provincial legislatures.

After the results were announced, the media speculated that the DA would dismiss Maimane due to the party's decline in the polls. When asked about the speculations, the DA Federal Council Chairperson James Selfe said "that will be up to the party to decide." The following week, the party's Federal Chairperson Athol Trollip, after in consultation with the Federal Executive members, announced that Maimane could remain leader until the next DA Federal Congress.

=== Resignation ===
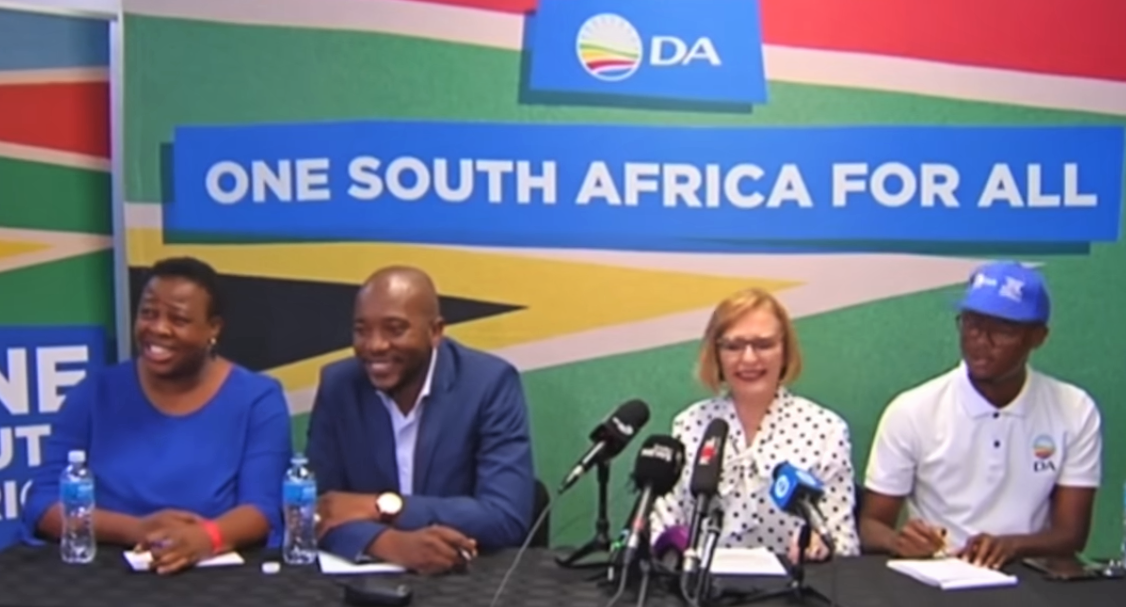
Maimane announcing Zille as the new federal council chair on 20 October 2019. He resigned three days later on 23 October

On 20 October 2019, Helen Zille was elected federal council chairperson, a high-ranking position in the DA. The following day, Herman Mashaba announced his intention to resign as Johannesburg mayor and DA member due to disputes with party leadership. This move from Mashaba created speculation that Maimane would also imminently resign. Maimane announced his resignation as federal leader of the DA on 23 October, ending months of speculation that he would be removed as party leader following the party's decline in the 2019 general elections. In his resignation speech, Maimane said "despite my best efforts, the DA is not the vehicle best suited to take forward the vision of building one South Africa for all." Maimane offered to remain as parliamentary leader until the end of 2019. Federal Chairperson Athol Trollip resigned his post too. Maimane resigned as an MP and party member on 24 October. John Steenhuisen succeeded him as parliamentary leader and interim federal leader.

== Later career ==
In 2020, Maimane launched the One South Africa Movement (OSAM), a civic organisation. He added that he will not form a new political party unlike his former colleague Mashaba. However, apparently due to the slowed electoral reform process in South Africa, in September 2022 he founded the political party Build One South Africa and currently serves as the party's leader. Mmusi Maimane is currently Member of the National Assembly since 14 June 2024. In July 2024, BOSA leader Mmusi Maimane was elected as Chairperson of Parliament's Standing Committee on Appropriations.

In 2022, Maimane became a shareholder and business partner at investment house SiSebenza.

== Personal life ==
Maimane has been married to Natalie Maimane since 2005. They have three children together.

In August 2022, Maimane was robbed at gunpoint in a Cape Town bar. Private security companies and the police quickly arrived on scene and no one was hurt. Maimane said that while he was glad no one was hurt, this was a stark reminder of the high level of violent crime in the country.

Party political offices
Preceded by Lindiwe Mazibuko	National Spokesperson of the Democratic Alliance; 2011–2014	Succeeded by Marius Redelinghuys; Phumzile van Damme
Preceded by Lindiwe Mazibuko	Leader of the Democratic Alliance in the National Assembly; 2014–2019	Succeeded by Annelie Lotriet (acting); John Steenhuisen
Preceded by Helen Zille	Leader of the Democratic Alliance; 2015–2019	Succeeded by John Steenhuisen (interim)
Political offices
Preceded by Lindiwe Mazibuko	Leader of the Opposition; 2014–2019	Succeeded by Annelie Lotriet (acting); John Steenhuisen
