= Shadow Cabinet of Lindiwe Mazibuko =

South African shadow cabinet

The Shadow Cabinet of Lindiwe Mazibuko succeeded the Shadow Cabinet of Athol Trollip as the Official Opposition Shadow Cabinet. Not long after Lindiwe Mazibuko was elected as the parliamentary leader by the Democratic Alliance's caucus on 27 October 2011, she announced a new shadow cabinet, on 1 February 2012.

In her capacity of parliamentary leader, Mazibuko lead the Official Opposition Shadow Cabinet and represented party leader Helen Zille in parliament, who was Premier of the Western Cape. Elected alongside Mazibuko was Watty Watson, as Chief Whip, and former Fulbright Scholar Wilmot James as Chairman of the Caucus. This Shadow Cabinet included the Democratic Alliance's Federal Executive Chairperson James Selfe, CODESA negotiator Dene Smuts, along with former Fulbright Scholar Sej Motau and Harvard Mason Fellow David Maynier.

== Members of the Shadow Cabinet ==
Democratic Alliance parliamentary leader Lindiwe Mazibuko introduced new Shadow Cabinet on 1 February 2012. She reshuffled her Shadow Cabinet on 12 November 2013.

| Portfolio | Shadow Minister | Shadow Deputy Minister |
|---|---|---|
| Leader of the Opposition (South Africa); Parliamentary Leader of the Democratic Alliance | The Hon. Lindiwe Mazibuko MP | |
| Agriculture, Forestry and Fisheries | The Hon. Annette Steyn MP | The Hon. Pieter van Dalen MP |
| Arts and Culture | The Hon. Niekie van den Berg MP | The Hon. Ena van Schalkwyk MP |
| Basic Education | The Hon. Annette Lovemore MP | The Hon. Donald Smiles MP |
| Communications | The Hon. Marian Shinn MP | The Hon. Butch Steyn MP |
| Co-operative Governance and Traditional Affairs | The Hon. John Steenhuisen MP | The Hon. George Boinamo MP |
| Correctional Services | The Hon. James Selfe MP | The Hon. Lennit Max MP |
| Defence and Military Veterans | The Hon. David Maynier MP | The Hon. Shahid Esau MP |
| Economic Development | The Hon. Sej Motau MP | The Hon. Andricus van der Westhuizen MP |
| Energy | The Hon. Lance Greyling MP | The Hon. Jacques Smalle MP |
| Finance | The Hon. Tim Harris MP | The Hon. David Ross MP |
| Health | The Hon. Patricia Kopane MP | The Hon. Denise Robinson MP |
| Higher Education and Training | The Hon. Annelie Lotriet MP | The Hon. Lourie Bosman MP |
| Home Affairs | The Hon. Manny De Freitas MP | The Hon. Masizole Mnqasela MP |
| Human Settlements | The Hon. Stevens Mokgalapa MP | The Hon. Patty Duncan MP |
| International Relations and Cooperation | The Hon. Justus De Goede MP | The Hon. Bill Eloff MP |
| Justice and Constitutional Development | The Hon. Dene Smuts MP | The Hon. Debbie Schäfer MP |
| Labour | The Hon. Kenneth Mubu MP | The Hon. Haniff Hoosen MP |
| Mineral Resources | The Hon. James Lorimer MP | The Hon. Hendrik Schmidt MP |
| Police | The Hon. Dianne Kohler Barnard MP | The Hon. Dirk Stubbe MP |
| Presidency | The Hon. Joe McGluwa MP | |
| Public Enterprises | The Hon. Natasha Michael MP | The Hon. Erik Marais MP |
| Public Service and Administration | The Hon. Kobus Marais MP | The Hon. Deetlefs du Toit MP |
| Public Works | The Hon. Anchen Dreyer MP | The Hon. Japie van der Linde MP |
| Rural Development and Land Reform | The Hon. Mpowele Swathe MP | The Hon. Kevin Mileham MP |
| Science and Technology | The Hon. Junita Kloppers-Lourens MP | The Hon. Juanita Terblanche MP |
| Social Development | The Hon. Mike Waters MP | The Hon. Emmah More MP |
| Sport and Recreation | The Hon. Winston Rabotapi MP | The Hon. Donald Lee MP |
| State Security | The Hon. Theo Coetzee MP | The Hon. Dirk Stubbe MP |
| Tourism | The Hon. Stuart Farrow MP | The Hon. M.R. Sayedali Shah MP |
| Trade and Industry | The Hon. Wilmot James MP | The Hon. Geordin Hill-Lewis MP |
| Transport | The Hon. Ian Ollis MP | The Hon. Greg Krumbock MP |
| Water and Environmental Affairs | The Hon. Marti Wenger MP | The Hon. Francois Rodgers MP |
| Women, Children and Persons with Disabilities | The Hon. Helen Lamoela MP | The Hon. Sarah Paulse MP |

== Opposition Spokespersons in Standing Committees in the National Assembly of South Africa ==
| Portfolio | Spokesperson | Deputy Spokesperson |
|---|---|---|
| Appropriations | The Hon. Marius Swart MP | The Hon. Kenneth Mubu MP |
| Public Accounts (SCOPA) | The Hon. Dion George MP | The Hon. Pierre Rabie MP |

== Parliamentary Caucus Leadership ==
New elected parliamentary leadership post mid-term caucus elections on 27 October 2011.

| Member | Position |
|---|---|
| The Hon. Lindiwe Mazibuko MP | Parliamentary Leader of the Democratic Alliance |
| The Hon. Elza van Lingen MP | Leader in the National Council of Provinces |
| The Hon. Wilmot James MP | Chairperson of the Caucus |
| The Hon. Marti Wenger MP | Deputy Chairperson of the Caucus |
| The Hon. Watty Watson MP | Opposition Chief Whip in the National Assembly |
| The Hon. Sandy Kalyan MP | Opposition Deputy Chief Whip in the National Assembly |
| The Hon. Stuart Farrow MP | Whip in the National Assembly |
| The Hon. Dion George MP | Whip in the National Assembly |
| The Hon. Patricia Kopane MP | Whip in the National Assembly |
| The Hon. Annelie Lotriet MP | Whip in the National Assembly |
| The Hon. Erik Marais MP | Whip in the National Assembly |
| The Hon. David Maynier MP | Whip in the National Assembly |
| The Hon. Debbie Schäfer MP | Whip in the National Assembly |
| The Hon. Mike Waters MP | Whip in the National Assembly |
| The Hon. Tim Harris MP | Counsellor in the Leader's Office |
