= Shadow Cabinet of Athol Trollip =

The Democratic Alliance retained their position as official opposition in South Africa following the 2009 general elections and announced their shadow cabinet on May 15.

The Official Opposition Shadow Cabinet was led by Athol Trollip who succeeded Sandra Botha as the Democratic Alliance's parliamentary leader. Trollip represented party leader Helen Zille, who was serving as Premier of the Western Cape. The Shadow Cabinet included the Democratic Alliance's Federal Executive Chairperson James Selfe, former President of AgriSA Lourie Bosman, CODESA negotiator Dene Smuts, along with former Fulbright Scholars Sej Motau and Wilmot James, former Rhodes Scholar Gareth Morgan and Harvard Mason Fellow David Maynier.

The shadow cabinet was succeeded by the Shadow Cabinet of Lindiwe Mazibuko.

== Official Opposition Shadow Cabinet Team ==
Member	Shadow Portfolio
Athol Trollip	Parliamentary Leader of the Democratic Alliance and Shadow Minister of the Presidency
Lourie Bosman	Shadow Minister of Agriculture, Forestry and Fisheries
Prof. Annelie Lotriet	Shadow Minister of Arts and Culture
Dr. Junita Kloppers-Lourens	Shadow Minister of Basic Education
Natasha Michael	Shadow Minister of Communications
Willem Doman	Shadow Minister of Co-operative Governance and Traditional Affairs
James Selfe	Shadow Minister of Correctional Services
David Maynier	Shadow Minister of Defence
Sej Motau	Shadow Minister of Energy
Dr. Dion George	Shadow Minister of Finance
Mike Waters	Shadow Minister of Health
Prof. Wilmot James	Shadow Minister of Higher Education
Juanita Terblanche	Shadow Minister of Home Affairs
Butch Steyn	Shadow Minister of Human Settlements (Housing)
Kenneth Mubu	Shadow Minister of International Relations and Cooperation
Dene Smuts	Shadow Minister of Justice and Constitutional Development
Andrew Louw	Shadow Minister of Labour
Hendrik Schmidt	Shadow Minister of Mining
Dianne Kohler Barnard	Shadow Minister of Police
Dr. Manie van Dyk	Shadow Minister of Public Enterprises
Anchen Dreyer	Shadow Minister of Public Service and Administration
James Masango	Shadow Minister of Public Works
Mpowele Swathe	Shadow Minister of Rural Development and Land Reform
Sandy Kalyan	Shadow Minister of Science and Technology
Patricia Kopane	Shadow Minister of Social Development
Donald Lee	Shadow Minister of Sport and Recreation
Theo Coetzee	Shadow Minister of State Security
Gregory Krumbock	Shadow Minister of Tourism
Tim Harris	Shadow Minister of Trade and Industry
Stuart Farrow	Shadow Minister of Transport
Gareth Morgan	Shadow Minister of Water and Environmental Affairs
Denise Robinson	Shadow Minister of Women, Youth, Children and People with Disabilities

Additional Members in Attendance

Member	Portfolio
Ian Davidson	Opposition Chief Whip in the National Assembly
Mike Ellis	Opposition Deputy Chief Whip in the National Assembly
Armiston Watson	Opposition Chief Whip in the National Council of Provinces
Marius Swart	Opposition Spokesperson on the Appropriations Committee
Mark Steele	Opposition Spokesperson on the Public Accounts Committee
Vacant	Leader's Counsellor
Lindiwe Mazibuko	Official Opposition National Spokesperson
