= Helen Lamoela =

South Africa politician and educator

The Honourable Helen Lamoela
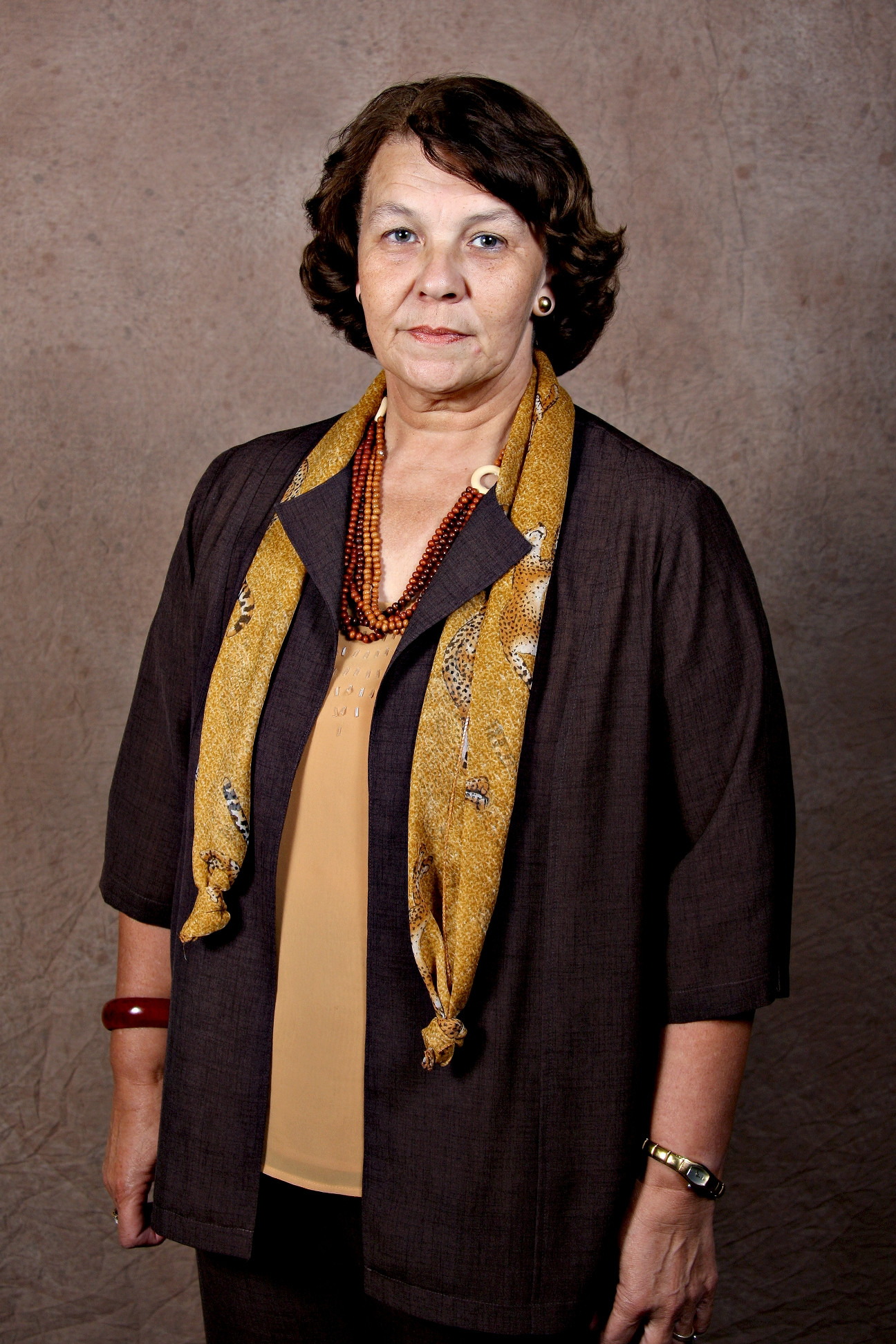

Shadow Minister of Women, Children and Persons with Disabilities
- In office 1 February 2012 – 6 May 2014
- Leader: Lindiwe Mazibuko
- Preceded by: Denise Robinson
- Succeeded by: Office abolished (Denise Robinson as Shadow Minister of Women in the Presidency)

Shadow Deputy Minister of Social Development
- In office 14 May 2009 – 1 February 2012
- Leader: Athol Trollip; Lindiwe Mazibuko
- Preceded by: Unknown
- Succeeded by: Emmah More

Member of the National Assembly
- In office 6 May 2009 – 6 May 2014
- Constituency: Western Cape

Member of the National Council of Provinces
- In office 23 April 2004 – 6 May 2009
- Constituency: Western Cape

Personal details
- Party: Democratic Alliance
- Other political affiliations: Democratic Party
- Education: Zonnebloem College
- Profession: Educator; Politician

Helen Lamoela is a retired South Africa politician and educator. She served as a Member of the National Assembly from 2009 to 2014, representing the opposition Democratic Alliance. She previously served as Member of the National Council of Provinces from 2004 to 2009. She served in the Shadow Cabinet of Athol Trollip as Shadow Deputy Minister of Social Development from 2009 to 2012, and in the Shadow Cabinet of Lindiwe Mazibuko as Shadow Minister of Women, Children and Persons with Disabilities from 2012 to 2014.

== Early life and political career ==
Lamoela was born in the Cape Province or Eastern Cape, as it is presently known. She moved to Cape Town and studied at the Zonnebloem College. She obtained a teaching diploma. She also completed diplomas in business management and advanced bookkeeping.

Lamoela joined the Democratic Party in 1992. She was appointed regional organiser for the Democratic Alliance in 2000 and was subsequently appointed an acting director of the Democratic Alliance in the western region of the province.

She was elected to the National Council of Provinces in 2004, representing the Western Cape. She was elected to the National Assembly in 2009. Democratic Alliance Parliamentary Leader, Athol Trollip, announced his new Shadow Cabinet in May 2009. Lamoela was appointed Shadow Deputy Minister of Social Development. She served until February 2012, when Lindiwe Mazibuko announced her Shadow Cabinet. Lamoela was appointed Shadow Minister of Women, Children and Persons with Disabilities.

Lamoela left the National Assembly after the 2014 elections.
