= Debbie Schäfer =

South African politician and lawyer (born 1966)

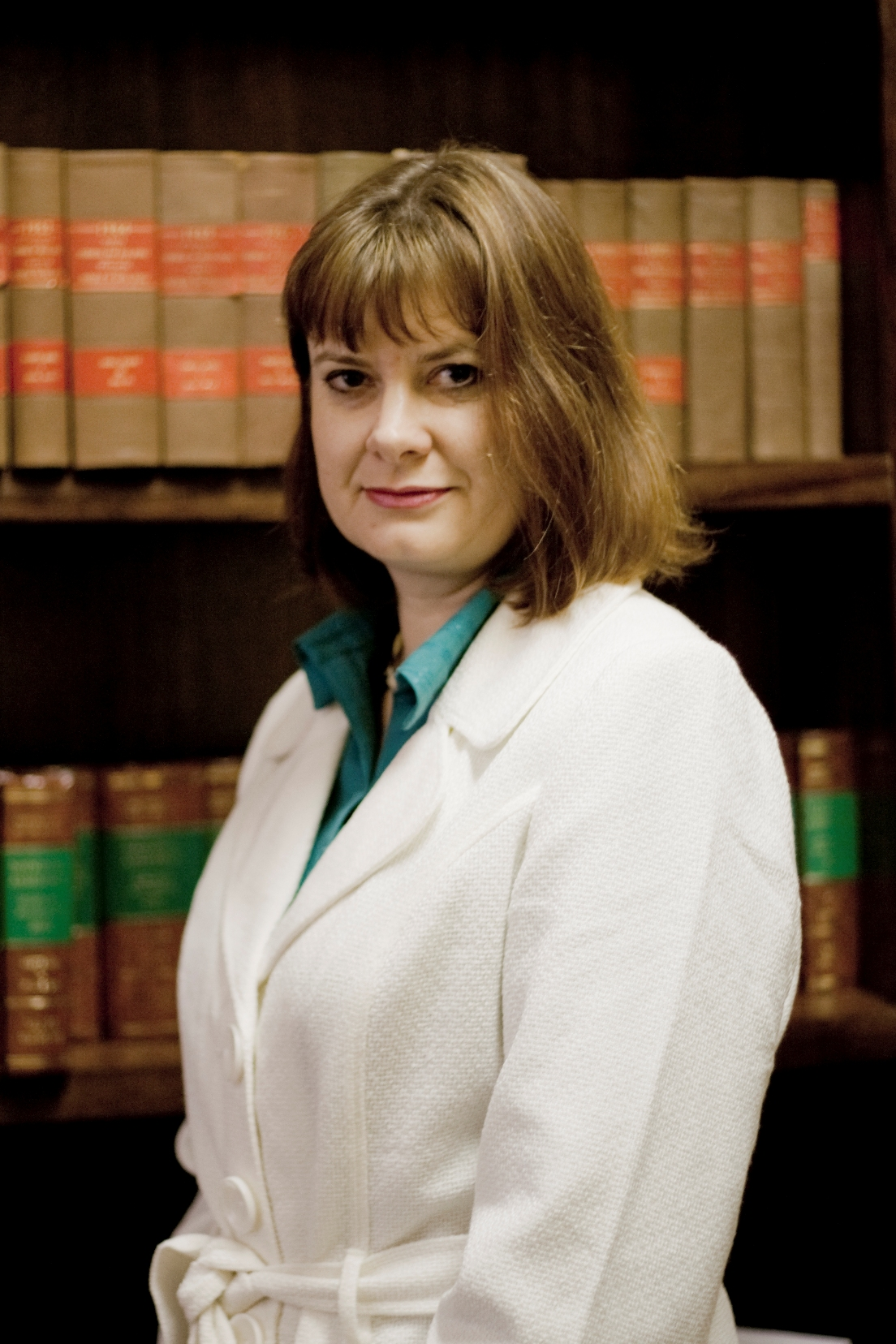

Western Cape Provincial Minister of Education
- In office 26 May 2014 – 15 May 2022
- Premier: Alan Winde; Helen Zille
- Preceded by: Donald Grant
- Succeeded by: David Maynier

Shadow Deputy Minister of Justice and Constitutional Development
- In office 6 September 2010 – 6 May 2014
- Leader: Athol Trollip; Lindiwe Mazibuko
- Preceded by: Natasha Mazzone
- Succeeded by: Werner Horn

Shadow Deputy Minister of Police
- In office 14 May 2009 – 6 September 2010
- Leader: Athol Trollip
- Preceded by: Unknown
- Succeeded by: Mpowele Swathe

Member of the Western Cape Provincial Parliament
- In office 21 May 2014 – 15 May 2022

Member of National Assembly
- In office 6 May 2009 – 6 May 2014

Personal details
- Born: 18 December 1966 (age 59) Pietermaritzburg, Natal
- Party: Democratic Alliance (2000–present)
- Other political affiliations: Democratic Party (1999–2000)
- Spouse: Mark Schäfer
- Education: Bergvliet High School; University of Cape Town

Deborah Anne Schäfer (born 18 December 1966) is a South African politician and lawyer who served as the Western Cape Provincial Minister of Education and a Member of the Western Cape Provincial Parliament for the Democratic Alliance (DA) from 2014 to 2022. Prior to serving in the provincial government, Schäfer served as a Member of the National Assembly from 2009 to 2014.

== Early life and family ==
Schäfer was born on 18 December 1966 in Pietermaritzburg in the Natal Province, and is of South African descent. During her early years, her family relocated to Johannesburg, where she completed her primary school education. They later moved to Cape Town where she matriculated from Bergvliet High School in 1984.

She achieved a Bachelor of Arts in English and Psychology from the University of Cape Town and, later on, in 1990, she received a Bachelor of Laws from the same university. She is married to Mark Schäfer. They have twin daughters, who both finished high school in 2017.

Schäfer practised as an attorney of the Cape High Court for twelve years before starting her political career as a ward councillor.

== Political career ==
Schäfer joined the Democratic Party in 1999. In 2002, she was elected to the Cape Town City Council as the councillor for ward 62, an area that included the suburbs of Wynberg and Constantia. In the 2006 elections, she was elected the councillor for ward 73. She served in this position until her election to the National Assembly in the 2009 general election.

On 14 May 2009, the Democratic Alliance released a statement, in which Schäfer was appointed Shadow Deputy Minister of Police. Democratic Alliance Parliamentary Leader Athol Trollip reshuffled his Shadow Cabinet in September 2010 and appointed Schäfer as the Shadow Deputy Minister of Justice and Constitutional Development. She retained her position when newly elected Parliamentary Leader Lindiwe Mazibuko announced her Shadow Cabinet in February 2012. During her tenure in Parliament, she served on the Magistrates’ Commission.

In the 2014 elections, she was elected to the Western Cape Provincial Parliament. Premier Helen Zille announced in a subsequent statement that Schäfer had been appointed as the Provincial Minister of Education. She was sworn in by Western Cape Deputy Judge President Jeanette Traverso. Following her re-election in May 2019, newly elected premier Alan Winde announced that Schäfer would remain as Provincial Minister of Education.

=== Resignation ===
On 21 April 2022, Schäfer announced that she would be resigning as the Provincial Minister of Education and as a Member of the Provincial Parliament to take up a job in the legal sector in the United Kingdom. She said: "It has been my great privilege to have served as Provincial Minister of Education in the Western Cape Government for the last eight years. I believe I have left the Department in a better place than I found it, and am proud of the work that we have, together, achieved. I am, however, now ready to bow out of public life." She also thanked former premier Zille and premier Winde for appointing her to their provincial cabinets. She will remain a member of the DA. The following day, Winde announced that the Provincial Minister of Finance and Economic Opportunities, David Maynier would succeed Schäfer as the Provincial Minister of Education. Schäfer resigned from the provincial government and provincial parliament on 15 May 2022.
