= Annelie Lotriet =

South African politician (born 1960)

The Honourable Annelie Lotriet MP
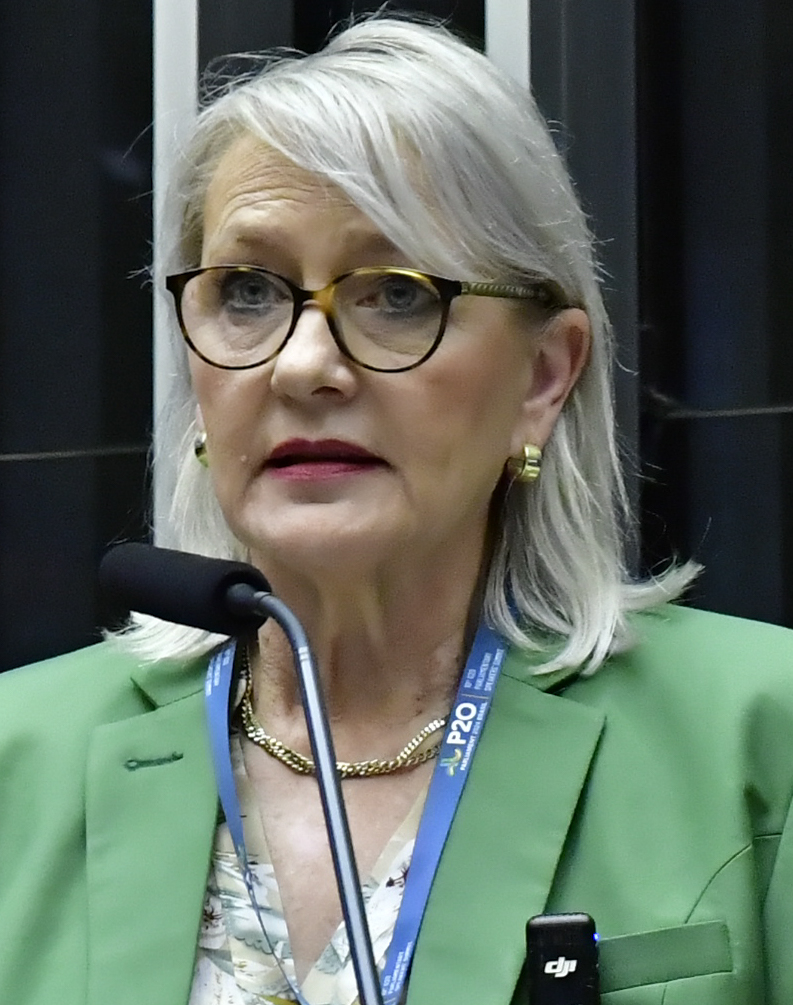
- Lotriet in 2024

Deputy Speaker of the National Assembly of South Africa
- Incumbent
- Assumed office 14 June 2024
- Speaker: Thoko Didiza
- Preceded by: Lechesa Tsenoli

Deputy Chairperson of the Democratic Alliance Federal Council
- In office 2 April 2023 – 12 April 2026
- Leader: John Steenhuisen
- Chairperson: Helen Zille

Deputy Chief Whip of the Official Opposition
- In office 18 August 2022 – 28 May 2024
- Leader: John Steenhuisen
- Chief Whip: Siviwe Gwarube
- Preceded by: Siviwe Gwarube

Member of the National Assembly
- Incumbent
- Assumed office 6 May 2009
Shadow Ministries 2009–2019
Shadow Minister of Science and Technology
In office 5 June 2014 – 5 June 2019
| Deputy | Chantel King |
| Leader | Mmusi Maimane |
| Preceded by | Junita Kloppers-Lourens |
| Succeeded by | Belinda Bozzoli |
Shadow Minister of Higher Education and Training
In office 1 February 2012 – 5 June 2014
| Deputy | Lourie Bosman |
| Leader | Lindiwe Mazibuko |
| Preceded by | Wilmot James |
| Succeeded by | Belinda Bozzoli |
Shadow Minister of Arts and Culture
In office 14 May 2009 – 1 February 2012
| Deputy | Désirée van der Walt |
| Leader | Athol Trollip |
| Preceded by | Désirée van der Walt |
| Succeeded by | Niekie van den Berg |

Personal details
- Born: 8 June 1960 (age 66) Johannesburg, Transvaal, Union of South Africa
- Party: Democratic Alliance (since 1999)
- Spouse: Pieter Lotriet
- Education: Rand Afrikaans University; University of South Africa

Annelie Lotriet (born 8 June 1960) is a South African politician who is currently serving as the Deputy Speaker of the National Assembly of South Africa since June 2024. She has served in the Official Opposition Shadow Cabinet since she joined the National Assembly in 2009. She also served as a Deputy Chairperson of the Democratic Alliance (DA) Federal Council from 2023 until 2026.

Born in Johannesburg, Lotriet spent the first two decades of her career as an academic in the Free State, teaching at Vista University and then at the University of the Free State. After one term as a local councillor in Mangaung, she entered politics full-time at the 2009 general election. She went on to serve as Shadow Minister of Arts and Culture from 2009 to 2012, Shadow Minister of Higher Education and Training from 2012 to 2014, Shadow Minister of Science and Technology from 2014 to 2019, and DA Caucus Chairperson from 2019 to 2022. Most recently, she was Opposition Deputy Chief Whip from August 2022 to June 2024.

In parallel with her parliamentary activities, Lotriet was DA Provincial Chairperson in the Free State between September 2012 and November 2020. After unsuccessful campaigns for higher leadership in 2018 and 2020, she was elected to deputise Helen Zille as Deputy Chairperson of the DA Federal Council in April 2023. She unsuccessfully stood for re-election in 2026.

== Early life and education ==
Born and raised in Johannesburg, Lotriet matriculated at the Hoërskool Linden, an Afrikaans-medium school in Linden. She attended the Rand Afrikaans University, where she completed a B.A. in languages, with concentrations in English and Latin. Thereafter, at the same university, she completed a B.Ed., an M.Ed., and a D.Ed. specialising in higher education. She also holds an L.L.B. from the University of South Africa. She was a member of the student representative council at university and was a member of the Progressive Federal Party in the 1980s.

== Academic career ==
Between 1985 and 1994, Lotriet was a lecturer in the education department at Vista University in Bloemfontein, the capital of the Free State. Thereafter she moved to the University of the Free State, also in Bloemfontein; entering as a senior lecturer in the Unit for Language Facilitation and Empowerment, she ultimately became a professor and the head of the department of Afroasiatic studies, sign language and language practice. Her research interests included language and multilingualism, and she was involved in training interpreters for government service and for service at the Truth and Reconciliation Commission.

In tandem with her academic career, Lotriet was a member of the Pan South African Language Board, a president of Free State Aquatics, and, from 1985 to 2000, a member of the board of directors of OFM. She joined the Democratic Party in 1999, and in 2000 she was elected to represent the Democratic Alliance (DA) as a ward councillor in Mangaung, Free State. She served six years as a councillor.

== National Assembly ==
=== Fourth Parliament: 2009–2014 ===
Lotriet entered politics full-time after the April 2009 general election, when she was elected to represent the DA in the National Assembly, the lower house of the South African Parliament. She succeeded Désirée van der Walt as Shadow Minister of Arts and Culture in the Shadow Cabinet of Athol Trollip, and in February 2012 she was reshuffled to serve as Shadow Minister of Higher Education and Training in the Shadow Cabinet of Lindiwe Mazibuko. Later in 2012, at a provincial elective congress in Bloemfontein, she was elected to the first of three consecutive terms as provincial chairperson of the DA's Free State branch, serving under newly elected provincial leader Patricia Kopane.

=== Fifth Parliament: 2014–2019 ===
After her re-election to the National Assembly in the May 2014 general election, Lotriet was appointed as Shadow Minister of Science and Technology in the Shadow Cabinet of Mmusi Maimane. She also represented the DA in the ad hoc constitutional review committee established by Parliament to debate land expropriation without compensation. She was re-elected to her position as DA provincial chairperson in April 2015 and October 2017 respectively.

In the interim, and while still holding her Free State role, she launched an unsuccessful bid to enter the party's national leadership, standing for election as the DA's federal chairperson in 2018. She came in third place in the race, behind the incumbent, Athol Trollip, and Tshwane Mayor Solly Msimanga.

=== Sixth Parliament: 2019–2024 ===
Pursuant to the May 2019 general election, Lotriet was one of two candidates nominated to succeed Anchen Dreyer as chairperson of the DA's parliamentary caucus. On 30 May, she beat Alf Lees to gain election to the position, and Haniff Hoosen was elected as her deputy. During Parliament's opening sessions, the DA nominated her to stand as the National Assembly's house chairperson for committees, but the motion received only the DA's support and was defeated by 205 votes to 83; the African National Congress's Cedric Frolick was re-elected instead.

In that capacity, she served briefly as acting leader of the opposition in October 2019 after Mmusi Maimane's unexpected resignation from the DA. Thereafter she returned to her position as caucus chairperson in the Shadow Cabinet of John Steenhuisen, who was elected to succeed Maimane. At the DA's next federal congress in November 2020, she stood unsuccessfully for election as deputy federal chairperson of the DA, alongside Refiloe Nt'sekhe, Anton Bredell, and Jacques Smalle. Because there were only four candidates for three deputy chair positions, Lotriet was the only candidate not to win election. Later that month, she also ceded her provincial leadership role to Werner Horn, who was elected to succeed her as the DA's Free State provincial chairperson.

In August 2021, the DA nominated Lotriet to serve as Speaker of the National Assembly, a position recently vacated by Thandi Modise. She was defeated in a vote by the African National Congress candidate, Nosiviwe Mapisa-Nqakula, who won 199 votes to Lotriet's 82. Lotriet continued to serve as DA caucus chairperson, gaining re-election in the DA's internal midterm elections in December 2021, and during this period she also represented the DA in the parliamentary committee that recommended Busisiwe Mkhwebane's impeachment. In August 2022, after a shadow cabinet reshuffle, she was elected unopposed as the DA's deputy chief whip, under newly appointed chief whip Siviwe Gwarube.

At the DA's next federal congress in Johannesburg in April 2023, Lotriet stood for election as deputy chairperson of the DA Federal Council, this time as one of seven candidates. She won election on 2 April. She, Thomas Walters, and Ashor Sarupen serve as the trio of deputy chairpersons under chairperson Helen Zille.

=== Seventh Parliament: 2024–present ===
Lotriet was re-elected to her parliamentary seat in the May 2024 general election. On 14 June 2024, she was elected Deputy Speaker of the National Assembly of the South Africa, Lotriet is the first non-ANC member to hold this position since B.G. Ranchod, who served as Deputy Speaker between 1994 and 1996.

Lotriet unsuccessfully stood for another term as deputy chair of the DA Federal Council at the party's Federal Congress in April 2026.

== Personal life ==
She is married to Pieter Lotriet, with whom she has four adult sons.
