= 2015 Democratic Alliance Federal Congress =

South African political party conference

The Democratic Alliance held its 6th Federal Congress in Port Elizabeth, Eastern Cape from 9 May to 10 May 2015. After incumbent leader Helen Zille announced she would not seek reelection, the Congress became focused on the contest to succeed her.

== Election for Party Leader ==
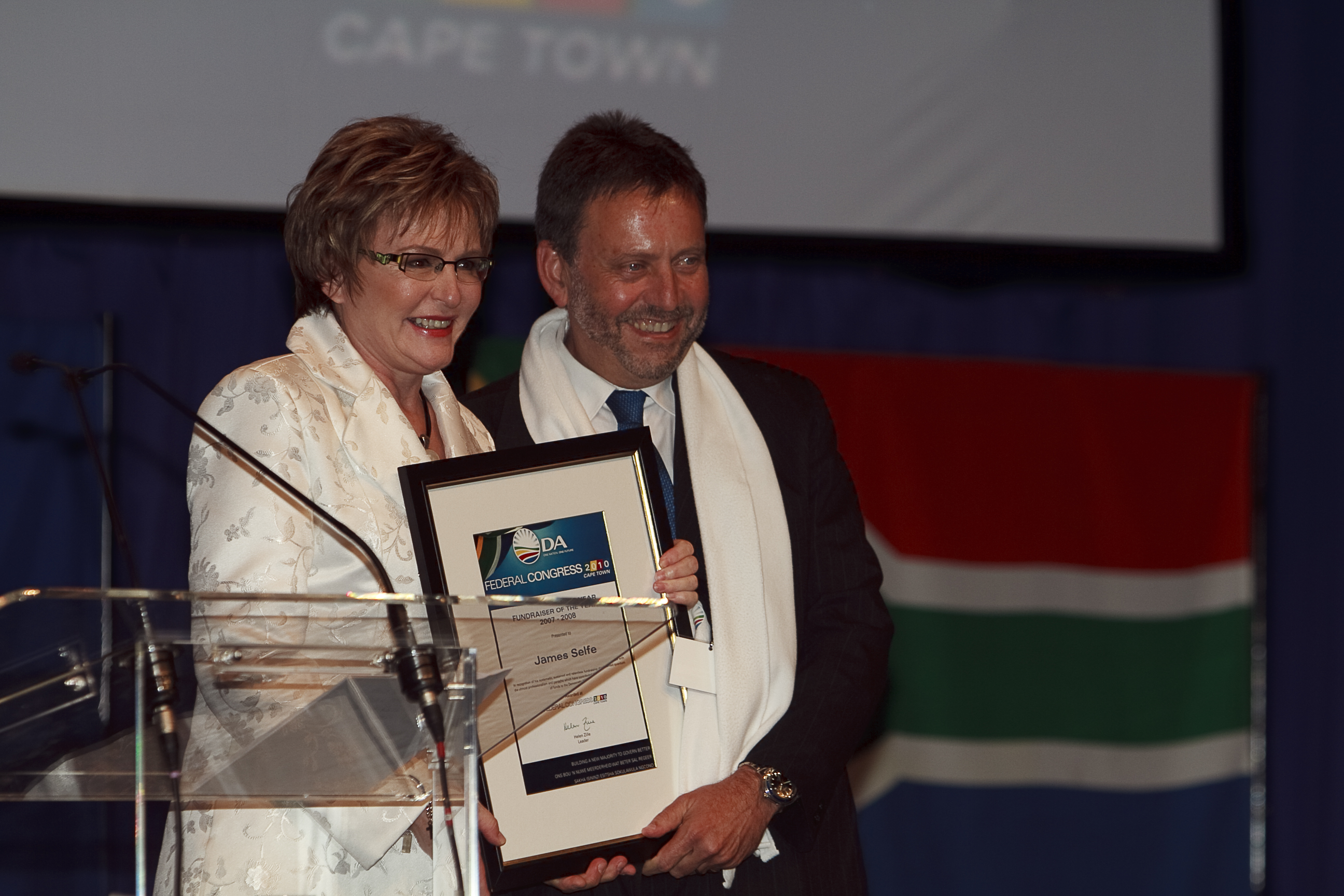
Helen Zille and James Selfe at the 2010 Federal Congress

Helen Zille announced on 12 April 2015 that she would not run for re-election to another term as leader of the party. She said that she would remain as Premier of the Western Cape until her term expires in 2019.

Many senior Democratic Alliance politicians names were touted as possible successors to Zille, such as Member of Parliament David Maynier, Parliamentary Leader Mmusi Maimane, Federal Chairperson Wilmot James, National Assembly Chief Whip John Steenhuisen, Gauteng Provincial Leader John Moodey, Eastern Cape Provincial leader Athol Trollip, Deputy Federal Chairperson Makashule Gana, Mayor of Cape Town Patricia de Lille and former Parliamentary Leader Lindiwe Mazibuko.

When the nominations deadline had passed, four candidates for the leadership had been put forward: Federal Chairperson Wilmot James, Parliamentary Leader Mmusi Maimane and party members Adrian Naidoo and Morgan Oliphant.

In the month leading to the vote, the two leading candidates, James and Maimane, traded barbs over issues such party democracy, transparency, and who would be most successful in challenging the ruling African National Congress. The two candidates addressed the provincial party congress in KwaZulu-Natal where James challenged Mamaine to a series of debates.

Continuing his criticism of Maimane's commitment to intra-party democracy and transparency, James released his list of donors in the last week of the campaign and called on his rival to do the same.

On May 10, following a vote by party delegates, outgoing leader Helen Zille declared Mamaine as the duly elected leader of the Democratic Alliance. 93% of delegates voted in the leadership race. According to his campaign, Maimane won with 90% of the vote.

He was the first black South African to lead the party, as he resigned in October 2019.

== Other Internal Party Elections ==
Eastern Cape Provincial Leader Athol Trollip was elected as Federal Chairperson after he defeated Makashule Gana and Masizole Mnqasela.

James Selfe was re-elected unopposed as Chairperson of the Federal Council.

Alf Lees defeated Dirk Stubbe and Andricus Van der Westhuizen in the election to become Federal Finance Chairperson.

Thomas Walters defeated Anthony Benadie and Adrian Naidoo and was subsequently elected Deputy Chairperson of the Federal Council.

Ivan Meyer, Refiloe Nt'sekhe and Désirée van der Walt were elected as first, second, and third Deputy Federal Chairpersons respectively.
