= Donald Grant (South African politician) =

South African politician

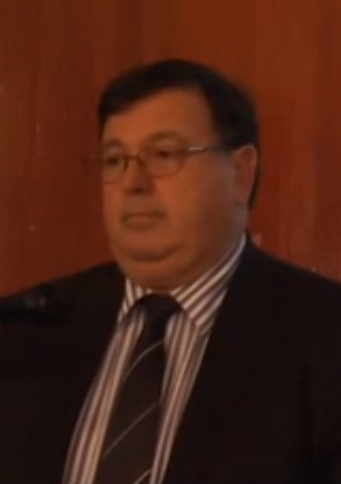

Western Cape Provincial Minister of Transport and Public Works
- In office 26 April 2014 – 22 May 2019
- Premier: Helen Zille
- Preceded by: Robin Carlisle
- Succeeded by: Bonginkosi Madikizela

Western Cape Provincial Minister of Education
- In office 7 May 2009 – 26 April 2014
- Premier: Helen Zille
- Preceded by: Yousuf Gabru
- Succeeded by: Debbie Schäfer

Member of the Western Cape Provincial Parliament
- In office 6 May 2009 – 7 May 2019

Personal details
- Born: Donald Arthur Cardross Grant
- Party: Democratic Alliance
- Education: University of Cape Town
- Occupation: Politician; Businessman

Donald Arthur Cardross Grant is a South African businessman and politician. He was the Western Cape Provincial Minister of Transport and Public Works from 2014 to 2019 and the Western Cape Provincial Minister of Education from 2009 to 2014. He was a Member of the Western Cape Provincial Parliament from 2009 to 2019. Grant started his political career as a councillor at the Bitou Municipality. Grant is a member of the Democratic Alliance (DA).

== Biography ==
Donald Grant obtained a Master of Business Administration at the University of Cape Town. He worked for several years in the private sector before he was elected a Bitou Local Municipality councillor.

In April 2009, he was elected as a Member of the Western Cape Provincial Parliament for the Democratic Alliance. He was sworn in as a Member on 6 May 2009. Newly elected Premier Helen Zille announced that Grant would become the Provincial Minister of Education, succeeding Yousuf Gabru. He was inaugurated as Provincial Minister on 7 May 2009 by Constitutional Court Judge Yvonne Mokgoro.

In the general election of 7 May 2014, he was re-elected for a second term as a member of the provincial parliament. Zille announced that Grant would now become Provincial Minister of Transport and Public Works, succeeding Robin Carlisle. He was inaugurated by Western Cape High Court Deputy Judge President Jeanette Traverso on 26 May 2014. Debbie Schäfer succeeded him as Provincial Minister of Education.

Grant left the provincial parliament after the 2019 elections, although he was elected to another term as an MPP. Newly elected Premier Alan Winde appointed him as a special adviser. In November 2021, he retired from the provincial government.
