= Lance Greyling =

South African politician

Member of the National Assembly
- In office 23 April 2004 – 28 February 2015

Personal details
- Born: Lance William Greyling; 14 June 1973 (age 53)
- Citizenship: South Africa
- Party: Democratic Alliance (since 2014)
- Other political affiliations: Independent Democrats (until 2014)
- Education: University of Cape Town

Lance William Greyling (born 14 June 1973) is a South African politician and civil servant who served in the National Assembly from 1999 to 2015. He was the chief whip of the Independent Democrats (ID) until 2014, when the party merged with the Democratic Alliance (DA). He also served as Shadow Minister of Energy under Opposition Leader Lindiwe Mazibuko from 2012 to 2014. Though Greyling was re-elected to his seat under the DA banner in 2014, he resigned in 2015 to work in the office of the Mayor of Cape Town.

== Early life and career ==
Greyling was born on 14 June 1973. He has a bachelor's and honours degree from the University of Cape Town, completed in 1996. Before entering politics, he was a manager at the GLOBE Project, where his job was equipping parliamentarians in South Africa to deal with environment and sustainable development issues.

== Legislative career ==
=== Independent Democrats: 2004–2014 ===
In the 2004 general election, Greyling was elected to represent the ID in the National Assembly. He was re-elected to a second term in 2009. He was the ID's chief whip, and he also spearheaded the ID's push to regulate the funding of political parties. In 2011, a parliamentary committee set aside a party funding bill proposed by Greyling, deciding, controversially, that it would be unconstitutional.

In addition, Greyling served as the ID's spokesperson on energy. In 2008, he and two other MPs – Gareth Morgan of the DA and Ruth Rabinowitz of the Inkatha Freedom Party – formed a non-partisan parliamentary lobby group, e-Parliament Renewable Energy Activists, to advocate for legislation on a transition to renewable energy. In this capacity, Greyling supported a private member's bill on feed-in tariffs, introduced by Rabinowitz. In February 2012, DA leader Lindiwe Mazibuko appointed Greyling as Shadow Minister of Energy; the ID had by then entered into cooperation with the DA, with a merger planned.

=== Democratic Alliance: 2014–2015 ===
The ID disbanded in the 2014 general election and Greyling, along with other former ID members, formally joined the DA. He was re-elected to his legislative seat under the DA banner. However, less than a year into the term, on 28 February 2015, he resigned from Parliament in order to become director for trade and investment in the office of the Mayor of Cape Town.
