= Donald Smiles =

South African retired politician and educator

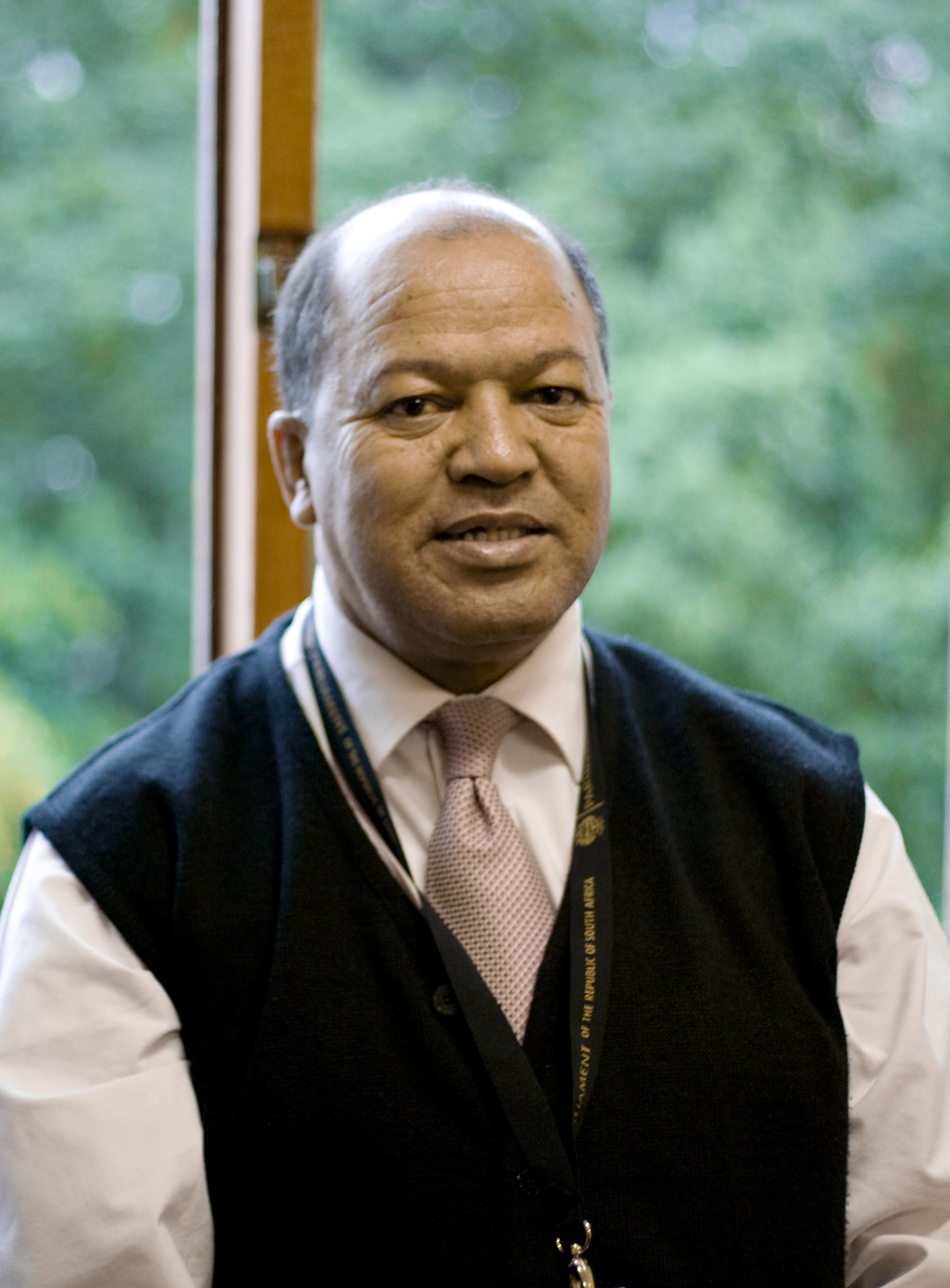
- Smiles in 2009

Shadow Deputy Minister of Basic Education
- In office 14 May 2009 – 6 May 2014
- Leader: Lindiwe Mazibuko; Athol Trollip
- Preceded by: Office established
- Succeeded by: Nomsa Marchesi

Member of the National Assembly of South Africa
- In office 6 May 2009 – 6 May 2014

Member of the Eastern Cape Provincial Legislature
- In office 1999–2009

Personal details
- Born: Donald Cecil Smiles; 5 October 1954 (age 71)
- Party: Democratic Alliance/Democratic Party (1998–present)
- Other political affiliations: Independent (1995–1998); African National Congress (Until 1995)
- Spouse: Merwida
- Children: 3
- Profession: Educator, politician

Donald Cecil Smiles (born 5 October 1954) is a South African retired politician and educator who served as a Member of the National Assembly of South Africa from 2009 to 2014 where he represented the Democratic Alliance. Prior to his election to parliament, he served as a DA representative in the Eastern Cape Provincial Legislature from 1999 until 2009.

== Career ==
Smiles qualified as a teacher by profession. In 1976 he was employed as a mathematics teacher at the Midlands Secondary School. During his time as a teacher at Midlands, he was detained on multiple occasions for campaigning for human rights and non-racialism between 1976 and 1989. He became the headmaster of Rosmead Primary School near the town of Middelburg in the present-day Eastern Cape province of South Africa. He was elected to the Transitional Local Council and later served in the local council of the Middelburg municipality where he was mayor as a member of the African National Congress between June 1994 and December 1995.

Smiles resigned from the ANC in 1995 and was then elected as an independent councillor. He joined the Democratic Party, which later became the Democratic Alliance, in 1998 and was elected to the Eastern Cape Provincial Legislature as a party representative the following year. He was re-elected to the provincial legislature in the 2004 provincial election.

Smiles was elected to the National Assembly of South Africa from the DA's Eastern Cape list in the 2009 general election. He was appointed the party's deputy spokesman on basic education shortly afterwards. Smiles did not stand for re-election in the 2014 general election and left parliament.

== Personal life ==
Smiles is married to Merwida. The couple has three children together.

In July 2020, Smiles and his wife spoke to TimesLIVE about their experience with COVID-19 during the COVID-19 pandemic in South Africa.
