= Kenneth Mubu =

South African politician

Kenneth Mubu MP
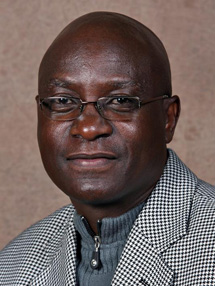

Shadow Minister of Public Works
- Incumbent
- Assumed office 2014
- Leader: Helen Zille
- Preceded by: Anchen Dreyer

Shadow Minister of Labour
- In office 2012–2014
- Preceded by: Sej Motau
- Succeeded by: Ian Ollis

Shadow Minister of International Relations and Cooperation

Member of Parliament for Hammanskraal, Gauteng
- In office 6 May 2009 – 2012
- Succeeded by: Ian Davidson

Personal details
- Born: Lusaka, Zambia
- Died: 31 August 2015 Pretoria, South Africa
- Party: Democratic Alliance
- Children: Nothulu, Kondwani, Kenneth Junior, Tari and Shebo

Kenneth Mubu was a South African politician and a Member of Parliament with the Democratic Alliance, and the Shadow Minister of Public Works.

== Educational Background ==
Mubu graduated from the University of Zambia, with a Bachelor of Arts in Education, majoring in English and Geography. He obtained a Master of Arts degree in Journalism/Public Relations from Ball State University in Muncie, Indiana, USA and a Postgraduate Diploma in Management from Leicester University, United Kingdom as well as a Certificate in Public Relations Management from the Public Relations Institute of Southern Africa.

== Early career ==
In his early career, Kenneth taught Journalism and Public Relations at Evelyn Home College of Applied Arts and Commerce, Lusaka, before joining Mindolo Ecumenical Foundation, Kitwe, Zambia, as Public Relations Officer.

He later progressed to the Botswana Christian Council (BCC), Gaborone, as Communications Officer, where he was responsible for all communications work of the BCC.

In 1990, he moved to Geneva, Switzerland, working as Editor of the Ecumenical Press Service, a news agency of the World Council of Churches, compiling and distributing news to agencies, publications and electronic media globally.

After his successful stint at the WCC, Mubu joined the Diakonia Council of Churches in Durban, where he worked as Media and Publications Coordinator.

Mubu also played a critical role in voter education in the first democratic elections within South Africa in 1994, informing communities of their voting rights.

In 1995, Mubu was appointed as International Relations Officer at the University of Fort Hare, in the Eastern Cape, South Africa where he managed all partnership and student exchange programmes between the University and other institutions.

He then served as Director of Turfloop Foundation at the University of the North, mobilising funds and resources for development programmes.

Under his guidance, the Foundation realised the completion of EDUPARK, a multi-institution project outside of Polokwane.

In 1999, Mubu was appointed Manager for International Collaborations at Technikon Southern Africa (TSA) in Johannesburg, was later promoted to Head of Collaborations before election as Deputy Director for Africa in 2006 and finally Director for African Relations in 2007.

During his tenure, a number of important projects were achieved on the African continent. One of these being the Southern Sudan Capacity and Institution Building initiative, a project designed to train Southern Sudanese public officers in various civil service skills. By the end of 2008, over 1500 officers had undergone the training programme.

== Parliamentarian ==
As the Shadow Minister of International Relations and Cooperation for the Democratic Alliance he has strengthened their position as the “Official Opposition” to the African National Congress (ANC) in his firm statements on International Relations issues most recently on dictators such as Robert Mugabe, South Africa’s recent bailout of the Cuban economy and a recent UN resolution to remove sexual orientation references on extrajudicial killings.

He was DA Constituency Leader for Mamelodi from 2009-2014. After the South African general election results had been declared in 2014, the DA members in Hammanskraal unanimously requested that Kenneth Mubu MP become their Constituency Leader. Kenneth graciously took up the role.

His passing came as a great shock to the people of Hammanskraal and DA Councillor Michael Shackleton, who is also DA Chairperson for Hammanskraal, was elected as the Acting Constituency Leader until a new Leader was allocated to the Constituency. Bronwyn Engelbrecht MP was elected as the new DA Constituency Leader for Hammanskraal effective 28 October 2015.

== Offices held ==
Political offices
Preceded by ??	Shadow Minister of International Relations and Cooperation; 2009–present	Incumbent
