= Emma More =

South African politician

Emma More MPL

Member of the Gauteng Provincial Legislature
- Incumbent
- Assumed office 2024

Member of Parliament for Benoni, Gauteng
- In office 6 May 2009 – 6 May 2014

Personal details
- Party: ActionSA
- Other party: Democratic Alliance

Emma More is a South African politician currently serving as a Member of the Gauteng Provincial Legislature, representing ActionSA.

former Member of Parliament for the main opposition Democratic Alliance between 2009 and 2014. She then served as a DA councillor in the City of Johannesburg between 2014 and 2016.

More later left DA to join ActionSA. After the 2021 municipal elections, she again became a PR councillor in Johannesburg.

On 14 June 2024, she was sworn in as ActionSA's Member of the Gauteng Provincial Legislature.

Political offices
| Preceded by | South Africa Shadow Deputy Minister of Social Development ??-2014 | Succeeded by Lindy Wilson |
