= Junita Kloppers-Lourens =

South African politician and former educationist

Junita Kloppers-Lourens MP
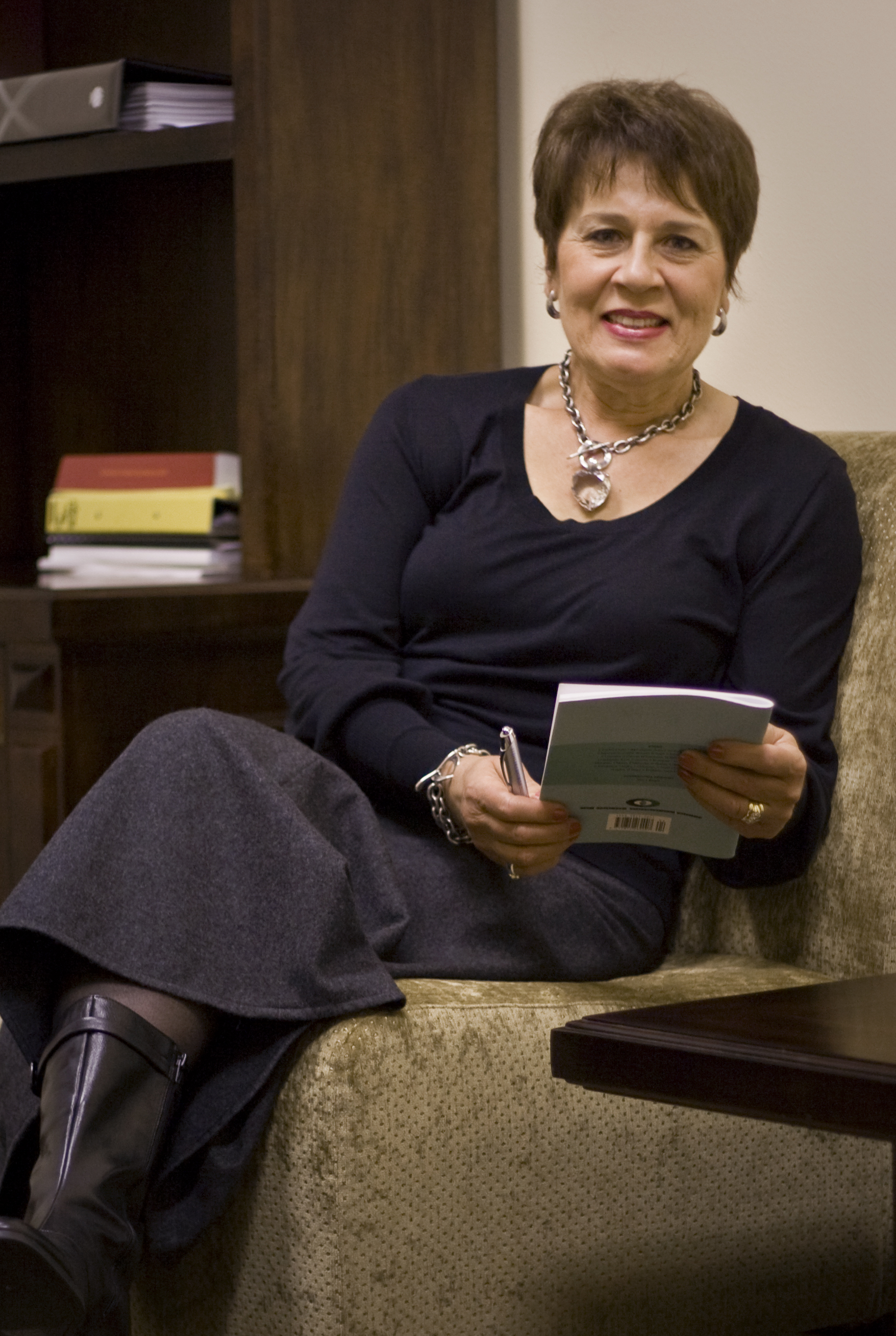

Shadow Minister of Science & Technology
- In office 2012–2014
- Leader: Helen Zille
- Preceded by: Sandy Kalyan
- Succeeded by: Annelie Lotriet

Shadow Minister of Basic Education
- In office 14 May 2009 – 6 September 2010
- Succeeded by: Wilmot James

Member of Parliament for Moot, Montana, Sinoville, Annlin, Brooklyn & Eersterust, Gauteng
- Incumbent
- Assumed office May 6, 2009

Personal details
- Born: Junita Carolina Kloppers Vanderbijlpark, South Africa
- Party: Democratic Alliance (DA)
- Spouse: Gerhard Lourens
- Profession: Politician, educator

Junita Carolina Kloppers-Lourens (born in Vanderbijlpark) is a South African politician and former educationist, a Member of Parliament with the Democratic Alliance (DA). She served as the Shadow Minister of Science & Technology from 2012 to 2014.

She studied history and law, and is a registered Insolvency Practitioner.

== Introduction ==
Dr. Kloppers-Lourens joined the DA in 2005 and was elected to parliament in April 2009. She has served as Shadow Minister of both Basic Education and later Higher Education and Training before taking up the position as the DA Shadow Minister of Science & Technology.

== Education ==
Kloppers-Lourens was born in Vanderbijlpark, Guateng, South Africa. She started her schooling career at Laerskool Totius and completed her matric at the Vanderbijlparkse Hoërskool.

She obtained a BA, HOD and Honours degree in history at the University of Pretoria (UP), a MEd and DEd [in curriculum science] at Rand Afrikaans University (Now University of Johannesburg), an LL.B. at the University of South Africa (UNISA), and the Association of Insolvency Practitioners of Southern Africa (AIPSA) at the UP.

== Early career ==
Kloppers-Lourens held various positions during her wide-ranging career as educationist. She started off as matric teacher (for which she received a merit award), became lecturer at two teacher training colleges, was appointed as scrutinizer/evaluator of manuscripts for text books, and occupied the post of a chief examiner for the Senior Certificate Examinations of the former Transvaal Education Department for many years.

She was later promoted to chief curriculum researcher and developer to the Bureau for Curriculum Development and Evaluation where, inter alia, she acted as co-leader in a world first project for the evaluation of the broad curriculum presented in schools of the Department of Education and Culture: National Assembly.

Kloppers-Lourens was also responsible for the compilation and presentation of radio programmes for the SABC on the core syllabus for History for several years.

After 1995 she was appointed by ABSA as Educational Project Leader of the AGN Power Matric initiative (an opportunity for previously disadvantaged persons to complete Grade 12) and also handled various ad hoc research projects on a contractual basis.

In addition to her experience in education, she acted as Public Relations Officer for Perskor Publishers for a number of years and was later appointed as Academic Publisher for Lex Patria Publishers, mainly responsible for the publication of law books.

== Current life/career ==
Kloppers-Lourens joined the DA in 2005 and was elected to parliament in April 2009.

She is also in the process of being admitted as an advocate of the High Court and is also a registered insolvency practitioner.

She was the DA Shadow Minister of Science and Technology.

She left parliament in 2014, but was later elected as a DA ward councillor in Overstrand Municipality in September 2015.

== Family life ==
She lives in Brooklyn, Pretoria and acts as the political head of Constituency 3 of the Gauteng North region. She is married to Gerhard Lourens, an attorney of Pretoria.

== Quote ==
Her quote: "Work is love made visible"
