= Anchen Dreyer =

South African politician

The Honourable Anchen Dreyer MP
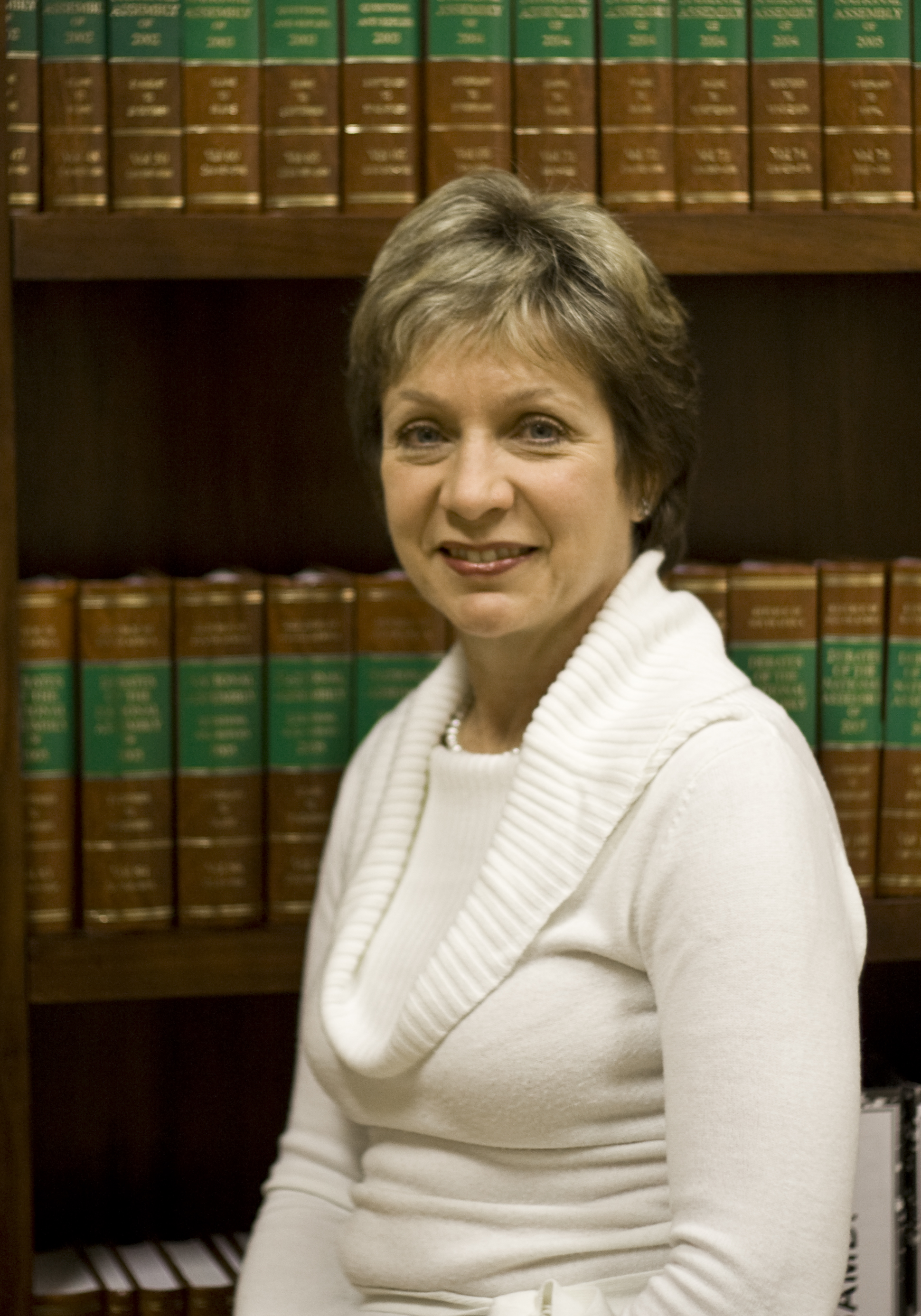

Democratic Alliance Caucus Chairperson
- In office 26 May 2014 – 29 May 2019
- Leader: Mmusi Maimane
- Preceded by: Wilmot James
- Succeeded by: Annelie Lotriet

Shadow Minister of Public Works
- In office 2012–2014
- Preceded by: James Masango
- Succeeded by: Kenneth Mubu

Shadow Minister of Public Service and Administration
- Preceded by: James Masango
- Succeeded by: Kobus Marais

Member of the National Assembly
- Incumbent
- Assumed office 2005

Deputy Federal Chairperson of the Democratic Alliance
- Incumbent
- Assumed office November 2010

Member of Parliament for Mogale City, Gauteng
- Incumbent
- Assumed office 2005

Personal details
- Born: 27 March 1952 (age 74) Pretoria, Transvaal Province, Union of South Africa
- Party: Democratic Alliance
- Education: Rand Afrikaans University

Anchen Margaretha Dreyer (born 27 March 1952) is a South African politician, a Member of Parliament for the opposition Democratic Alliance, and former Chairperson of the Democratic Alliance Caucus in the National Assembly. Before being elected unopposed to this position on 26 May 2014, she was first the Shadow Minister of Public Enterprises and thereafter the Shadow Minister of Public Works.

== Early life ==
Anchen Dreyer grew up in the then Transvaal province, attended primary school in the small town of Brits, and matriculated at Voortrekkerhoogte Hoёrskool in 1969. She obtained her tertiary education at the Rand Afrikaans University (RAU) obtaining the following degrees: BA, 1973; BA Honors in Sociology, 1977; BA Honors in Psychology, 1981; and MA in Clinical Psychology, 1983. She registered as a clinical psychologist with the South African Medical and Dental Council in 1983 and thereafter worked as a clinical psychologist in both Auckland Park and Sandton, Johannesburg, from 1983 to 1988. She established and managed a successful private practice as a clinical psychologist in Meliville, Johannesburg, from 1988 to 1994. She now considers herself a retired clinical psychologist and a full-time politician.

== Political career ==
She started her political life as a volunteer for the Progressive Federal Party in 1978. She served as Democratic Party (South Africa) councillor in Johannesburg City Council from 1991 to 1994, and as caucus leader in the Johannesburg Metropolitan Council from 1995 to 1997. She completed a five-year term as a Democratic Alliance member of the Gauteng Provincial Legislature in Johannesburg, serving initially as the spokesperson for agriculture, conservation, environment and land affairs, and was later elected as caucus whip from 1999 to 2002. She assumed office as the Democratic Alliance Gauteng provincial deputy chairperson from 2003 to 2004, and thereafter acted as DA media spokesperson at the election head office in Johannesburg, February to April 2004. In 2005, she became a Democratic Alliance Member of Parliament, where she served the party as a whip and the spokesperson on Labour. Her constituency is the Mogale City municipal area. She was re-elected to Parliament in 2009 and was appointed as the Shadow Minister of Public Service and Administration and has been Shadow Minister for Public Works since 2012. She has also served the party as a whip since 2005.

In May 2019, Annelie Lotriet was elected the new Democratic Alliance Caucus Chairperson, succeeding Dreyer.

== Personal life ==
Her 50-year-old brother Frans owner of VAStech died on the Afriqiyah Airways Flight 771 crash on 12 May 2010. Her great-grandfather, Louw Geldenhuys, was a city councilor and an MP.

She volunteered as a counselor to ex-detainees held without trial during State of Emergency, from 1989 to 1990. She served on WARM (Westene, Auckland Park, Richmond, Melville) Residents' Association Management Committee, from 1989 to 1991.
