= Donald Lee (politician) =

South African politician

Donald Lee MP
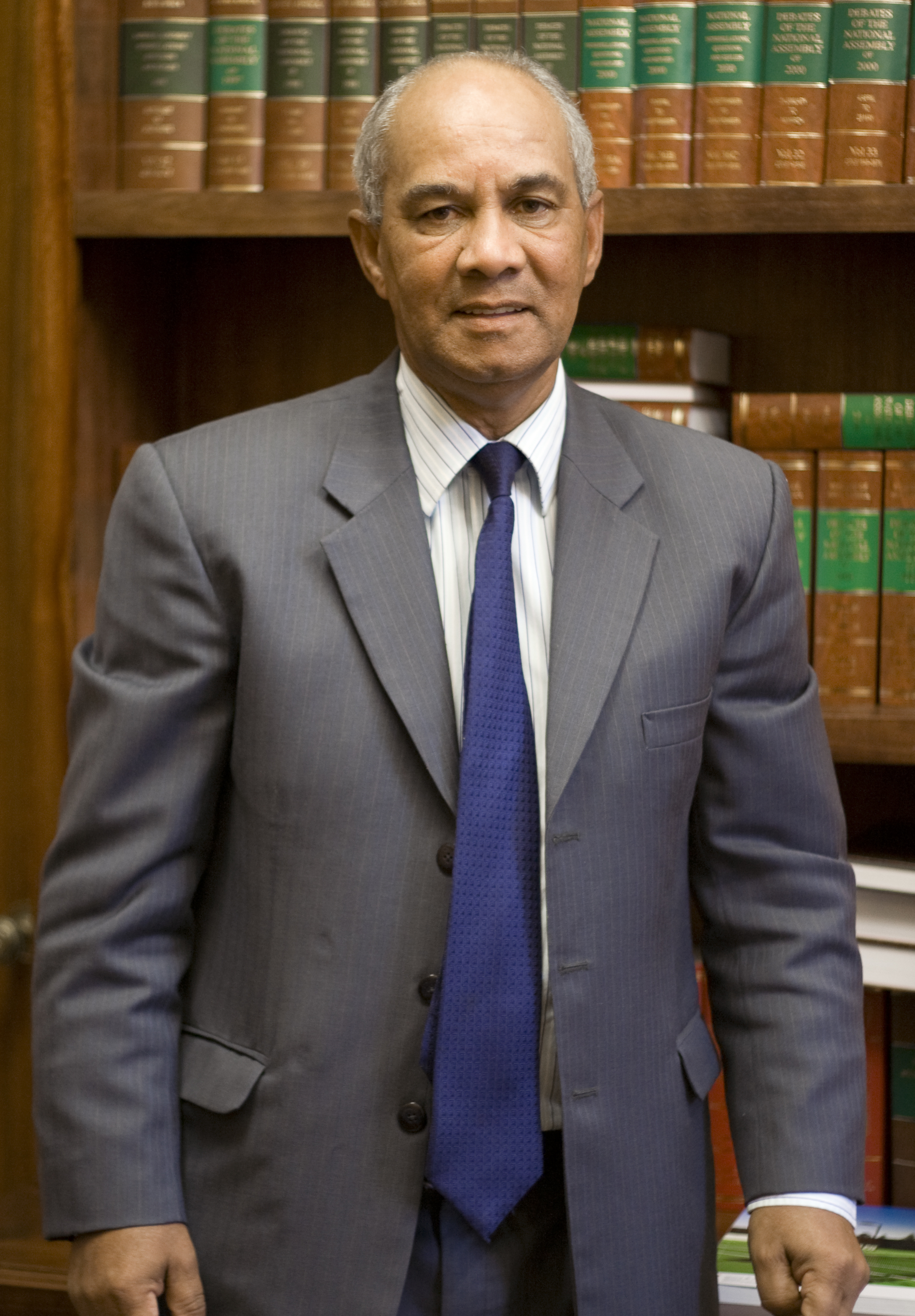

Member of Parliament for Port Elizabeth Northern Suburbs, Eastern Cape
- In office May 1999 – May 2014

Personal details
- Party: Democratic Alliance
- Profession: Teacher

Donald Lee is a South African politician, the Shadow Minister of Sport and Recreation from 1999 to 2012, and a Member of Parliament for the opposition Democratic Alliance (DA).

== Background ==
Lee is from the Eastern Cape and was a teacher for 30 years, as well as principal of a school in the Northern Areas of Port Elizabeth.

He is involved in the Eastern Cape Provincial Cricket Administration and is Chair of the Eastern Province Teachers Union.

== Political life ==
Lee began his political career as a councillor for the Port Elizabeth municipality, and has been a member of parliament since 1994, where he has occupied the education and public service and administration portfolios.

Lee has also held the position of Deputy Leader of the Eastern Cape, National Vice Chairperson and National Spokesperson for the DA. He was the DA spokesperson on sport and recreation from 2004 – 2009, and was appointed as Shadow Minister of Sport and Recreation on his re-election to Parliament in 2009.

== Interests and hobbies ==
Aside from his abiding passion for sports, he is also interested in international affairs and enjoys nature.

== Offices held ==
Political offices
Preceded by	South African Shadow Minister of Sport and Recreation; 2009–present	Incumbent
Preceded by	National Spokesperson for the Opposition; 2004–2009	Succeeded by Lindiwe Mazibuko
