= Denise Robinson =

South African politician

Denise Robinson MP
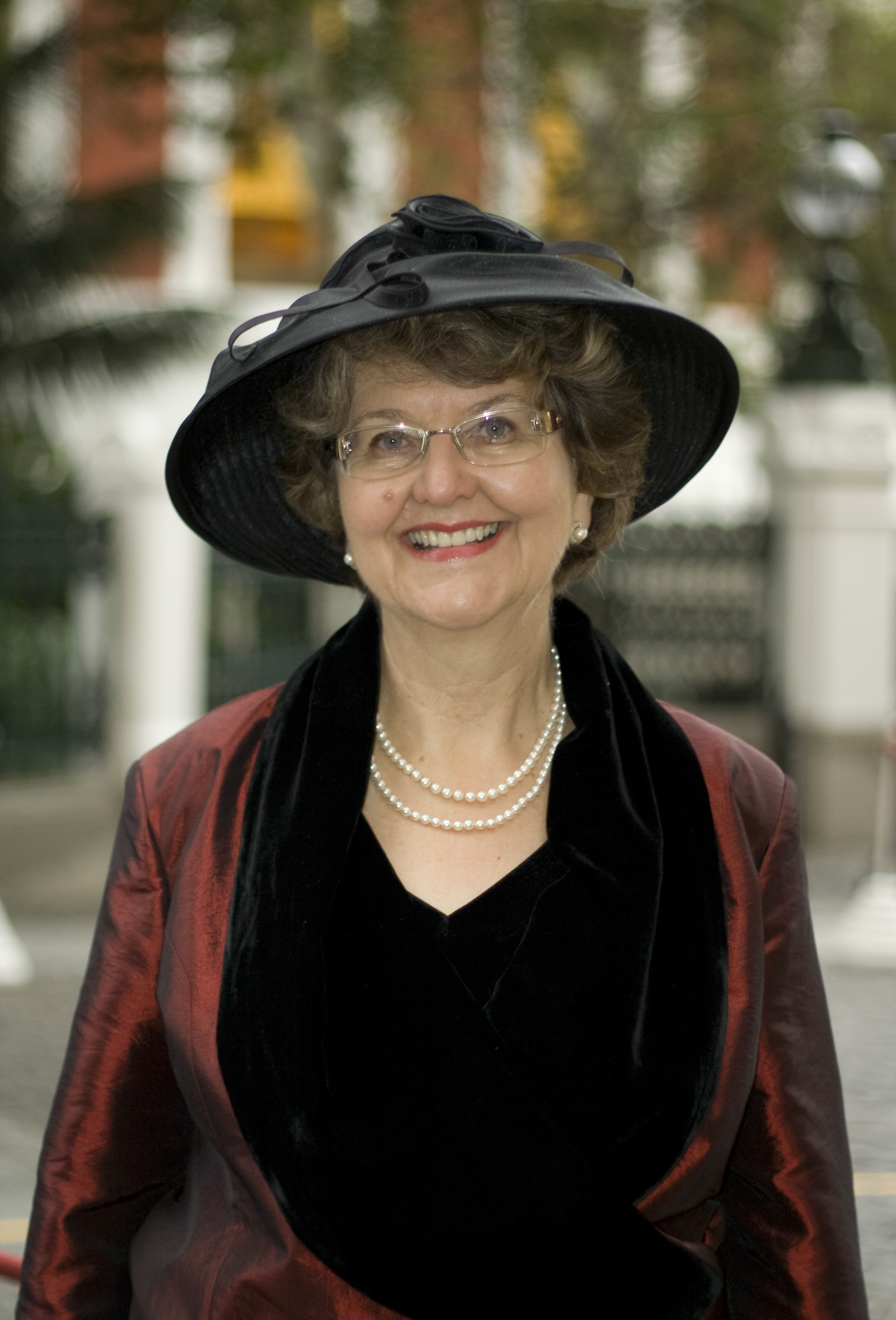

Shadow Minister of Women in the Presidency
- Incumbent
- Assumed office 2014
- Leader: Helen Zille

Deputy Shadow Minister of Health
- In office 2012–2014
- Succeeded by: Heinrich Volmink

Shadow Minister of Women, Youth, Children and People with Disabilities
- Succeeded by: Helen Lamoela
- In office 2012–2014

Personal details
- Born: 19 October 1948 (age 77)
- Party: Democratic Alliance
- Spouse: Stewart Gordon Robinson
- Children: 2
- Education: Rhodes University
- Profession: Educator

Denise Robinson is a former South African politician, a previous Member of Parliament with the Democratic Alliance, and the Shadow Minister of Women in the Presidency.

== Education and early career ==
Robinson grew up in Queenstown and matriculated at the Girls High School. She then studied at Rhodes University where she majored in English and History and graduated with a Bachelor of Arts and a University Education Diploma. She worked as a teacher in Kimberly and Cape Town for some years, then entered the field of adult education. She taught English at Sanlam and worked as a language advisor and translator.

== Political career ==
Robinson entered politics in 1998 when she became a Proportional Representative councillor in the Tygerberg Municipality for the Democratic Party. She was elected as ward councillor for the Unicity of Cape Town in 2000, representing the Democratic Alliance. She became a Member of Parliament in 2004, serving on the Select Committee of Finance and the Joint Budget Committee in the National Council of Provinces. She was appointed to the committee of the first African Peer Review Mechanism. In 2011, Robinson was appointed as the Shadow Minister of Health.

== 16 Days of Activism for No Violence Against Women and Children ==
In her position as Shadow Minister of Women, Youth, Children and People with Disabilities, Robinson drives the 16 Days of Activism Campaign for the DA. This campaign makes the following recommendations:

- Regularly monitor police stations’ compliance with the Domestic Violence Act
- Ensure rape prophylactic kits are available at all police stations
- Train volunteers as victim service workers
- Enforce maintenance payments
- Increase funding for social workers, psychologists and counsellors, both at police stations and magistrates' courts
- Establish more safe houses and subsidised shelters for victims of abuse

== Offices held ==
Political offices
Preceded by Shadow Minister of Women, Children and People with Disabilities	Shadow Minister of Health; 2011–present	Incumbent
