= David Maynier =

South African politician (born 1968)

The Honourable David Maynier MP
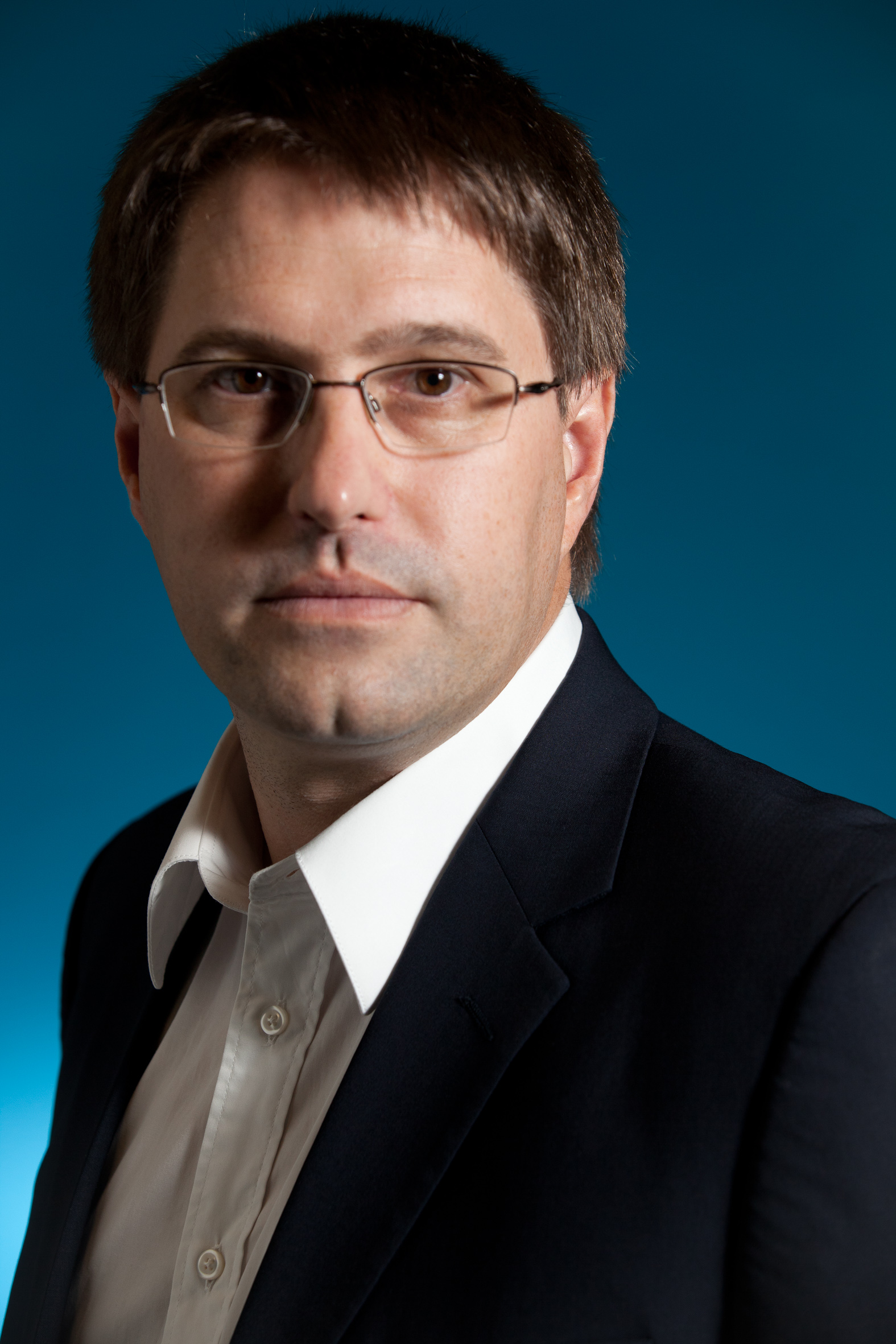

Minister of Forestry, Fisheries and the Environment
- Incumbent
- Assumed office 1 July 2026
- President: Cyril Ramaphosa
- Preceded by: Willie Aucamp

Western Cape Provincial Minister of Education
- In office 16 May 2022 – 30 June 2026
- Premier: Alan Winde
- Preceded by: Debbie Schäfer
- Succeeded by: Jaco Londt

Western Cape Provincial Minister of Finance and Economic Opportunities
- In office 23 May 2019 – 16 May 2022
- Premier: Alan Winde
- Preceded by: Position established
- Succeeded by: Mireille Wenger

Shadow Minister of Finance
- In office 18 June 2015 – 22 May 2019
- Leader: Mmusi Maimane
- Preceded by: Dion George
- Succeeded by: Geordin Hill-Lewis

Shadow Minister of Defence and Military Veterans
- In office 14 May 2009 – 18 June 2015
- Leader: Athol Trollip; Lindiwe Mazibuko; Mmusi Maimane
- Preceded by: Rafeek Shah
- Succeeded by: Kobus Marais

Member of the National Assembly of South Africa
- Incumbent
- Assumed office 30 June 2026
- In office 6 May 2009 – 7 May 2019

Member of the Western Cape Provincial Parliament
- In office 22 May 2019 – 30 June 2026

Personal details
- Born: 22 October 1968 (age 57) Cape Town, Cape Province, South Africa
- Party: Democratic Alliance
- Education: Harvard Kennedy School, Harvard University and University of Cape Town

David John Maynier (born 22 October 1968) is a South African politician who has been the Minister of Forestry, Fisheries and the Environment since July 2026 and a Member of Parliament for the Democratic Alliance since June 2026. He was the Western Cape Provincial Minister of Education from May 2022 until June 2026 and a Member of the Western Cape Provincial Parliament from May 2019 until June 2026. He served as the Western Cape Provincial Minister of Finance and Economic Opportunities from May 2019 to May 2022. Maynier was a Member of Parliament from 2009 to 2019, where he was Shadow Minister of Finance from 2015 to 2019 and the Shadow Minister of Defence and Military Veterans from 2009 to 2015.

== Background ==
Maynier matriculated from Grey High School in Port Elizabeth, and holds a Bachelor of Arts (Honours) degree from the University of Cape Town and a master's degree in Public Administration and Management from Harvard Kennedy School at Harvard University. He is a former submarine officer and navy diver in the South African Navy.

Maynier joined the Democratic Alliance as a researcher in 1999 and quickly rose to the position of Director of Research. In August 2000 he became Chief of Staff to party leader Tony Leon - a position he served until June 2004, when he became Assistant to the Chairperson of the Federal Executive. In February 2005 he was again promoted to Director of Fundraising, and he was awarded the party's 'Top Fundraiser of the Year' award at the 2007 Federal Congress, after modernising and professionalising the party's fundraising system. In 2008, he was appointed the DA's Deputy CEO with special responsibility for the Western Cape, the province where the DA has its strongest support base in South Africa. In 2009 he was the party's Campaign Manager in the Western Cape for the 2009 general election. The party won 51.3% of the vote in the province—up significantly from 27% in 2004. The result allowed Helen Zille to become Premier of the Western Cape, and saw the DA take control of the provincial legislature in an alliance with the Independent Democrats.

== Member of Parliament ==
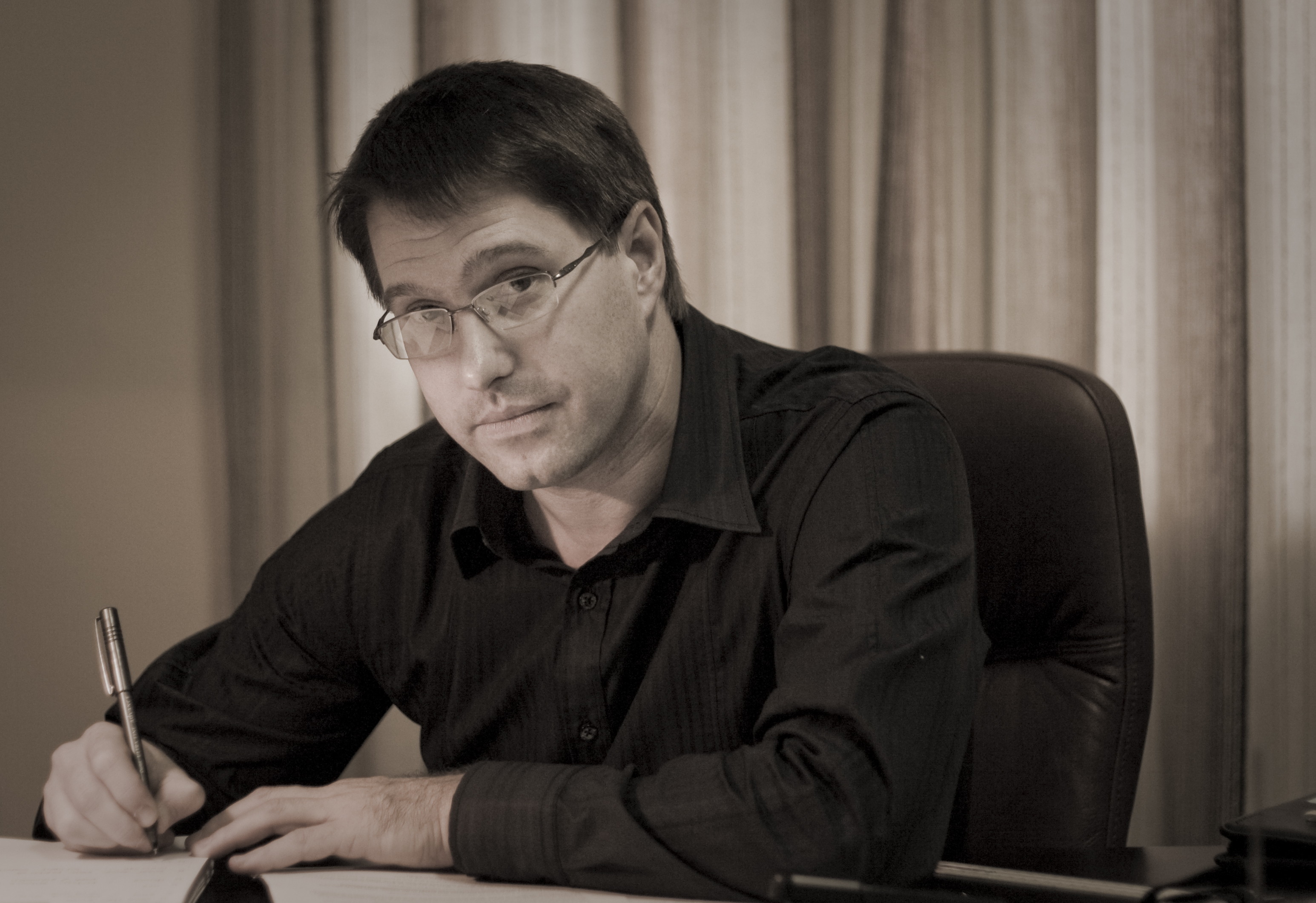
Photo of Maynier in his parliamentary office

After managing the DA's successful Western Cape electoral campaign, Maynier became a Member of Parliament, after appearing eleventh on the party's Western Cape national list. Following the election he was appointed Shadow Minister of Defence and Military Veterans. In his maiden speech to Parliament, Maynier issued a damning critique of the National Defence Force's state of combat readiness—telling Defence Minister Lindiwe Sisulu:

We have soldiers in barracks, not in the field; we have ships alongside, not at sea; and we have aircraft in hangars, not in the air. We have an army that is overstretched; a navy which is understretched; and an airforce with nothing to stretch.

On 2 August 2009, Maynier announced that a crisis in South Africa's National Conventional Arms Control Committee had resulted in weapons deals being conducted between South African firms and rogue states like North Korea, Iran and Libya. This included the committee authorising the sale of radar detectors for use on North Korean submarines, and aviator G-suits to Iran.

On 27 March 2013 Maynier led the thrust for a parliamentary inquiry into the SANDF's intervention in the Central African Republic coup.

In 2015, Maynier was appointed Shadow Minister of Finance by the new DA leader Mmusi Maimane.

In March 2019, the Democratic Alliance revealed their election lists for the 2019 elections. Maynier was announced as a candidate for the Western Cape Provincial Parliament. He left Parliament on 7 May 2019.

== Western Cape provincial government ==
On 22 May 2019, Maynier was sworn in as a Member of the Western Cape Provincial Parliament. The following day, 23 May 2019, he was named the new Provincial Minister of Finance and Economic Opportunities.

On 9 December 2019, Maynier announced the establishment of a task team to address congestion issues at the Port of Cape Town container terminal.

On 22 April 2022, premier Alan Winde announced that Maynier would be taking over from Debbie Schäfer as the Provincial Minister of Education when she leaves office on 15 May 2022. DA chief whip Mireille Wenger would then replace Maynier as the Provincial Minister of Finance and Economic Opportunities. Maynier officially became the Provincial Minister of Education 16 May 2022 as the changes made by premier Winde took effect. Following his re-election in the 2024 provincial election, Maynier was retained as provincial education minister by premier Alan Winde.

== National government ==
On 17 June 2026, the newly elected DA leader Geordin Hill-Lewis wrote to President Cyril Ramaphosa requesting that he appoint Maynier as the Minister of Forestry, Fisheries and the Environment in his cabinet. Ramaphosa acceded to Hill-Lewis's request on 30 June 2026. Maynier subsequently resigned from the provincial government and provincial parliament. He was sworn into office on 1 July 2026.
