= Sej Motau =

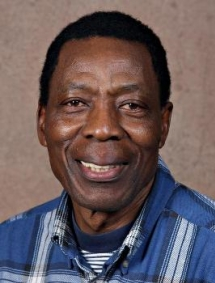

Shadow Minister of Presidency
- In office 5 June 2014 – 7 May 2019
- Leader: Mmusi Maimane
- Preceded by: Joe McGluwa
- Succeeded by: Solly Malatsi

Shadow Minister of Economic Development
- In office 2012 – 5 June 2014
- Preceded by: Haniff Hoosen

Shadow Minister of Labour
- In office 2012–2013
- Preceded by: Andrew Louw

Shadow Minister of Energy
- Succeeded by: Lance Greyling

Member of the National Assembly
- In office 6 May 2009 – 7 May 2019

Personal details
- Born: 18 July 1943 (age 83) Pretoria, Transvaal Province, Union of South Africa
- Party: Democratic Alliance (Until 2019)

Sejamothopo "Sej" Motau (born 18 July 1943) is a politician, journalist, communications and corporate affairs expert, and a former Fulbright Scholar. He was South Africa's Shadow Minister of Presidency, and a Member of Parliament for the opposition Democratic Alliance. From 2009 to 2012, he was the Shadow Minister of Energy.

Motau is a former journalist with the Pretoria News and The Star, and holds undergraduate and honours degrees from the University of South Africa, and a master's degree in journalism from the University of California, Berkeley.

Motau has worked as divisional manager of corporate affairs at Mercedes-Benz South Africa, and as head of corporate affairs at Transnet and Sasol. He worked as an independent communications consultant prior to joining the Democratic Alliance.

Motau left parliament at the 2019 general election.

== Early life ==
Sejamothopo Motau was born in Lady Selborne, Pretoria, on 18 July 1943. He started his working career as a book-keeper with the City Council of Pretoria in Atteridgeville, his current constituency.

== Education ==
A Fulbright scholar, Motau holds a Master of Journalism degree from the University of California, Berkeley, a BA (Hons) degree in communication and a BA degree in communication and psychology from the University of South Africa.

== Early career ==
A former journalist, he has worked for the Pretoria News, where his beats were education, labour and politics, the hot topics of the day. He then joined the Africa Edition of The Star, covering southern African politics. That sharpened his keen interest in politics but he did not become a member of any political party until he joined the DA in 2008, after which he was made him Shadow minister of Energy in 2009. His diverse work experience has given him a keen sense of what is going on within South Africa and makes him able to point out corruption within Eskom, the state-owned energy provider of South Africa.

A former chairman and director of various companies, Motau has held several senior management positions in some of the biggest corporations in South Africa, including Anglo American Corporation, De Beers Consolidated Mines Limited, Transnet Limited, Sasol Limited and Mercedes-Benz South Africa. During his time at De Beers he was seconded to the company's marketing arm in London, the Diamond Trading Company, where his brief was the United States of America.

Motau is ambassador-at-large and former president of PRISA, the Institute for Public Relations and Communication Management in Southern Africa, and former chairman of the Global Alliance for Public Relations and Communication Management.

An accomplished public speaker, he has presented papers at conferences and conducted workshops, mainly in public relations and communication in South Africa other parts of Africa and the world.

== Personal life ==
He is married to Ngoatladi, and has three children and four grandchildren.

== Offices held ==
Political offices
Preceded by Hendrick Schmidt	South African Shadow Minister of Energy; 2009–present	Incumbent
Preceded by Ian Ollis	South African Shadow Minister of Labour; 2012–present	Incumbent
