= Lourie Bosman =

South African politician

Dr Lourie Bosman MP
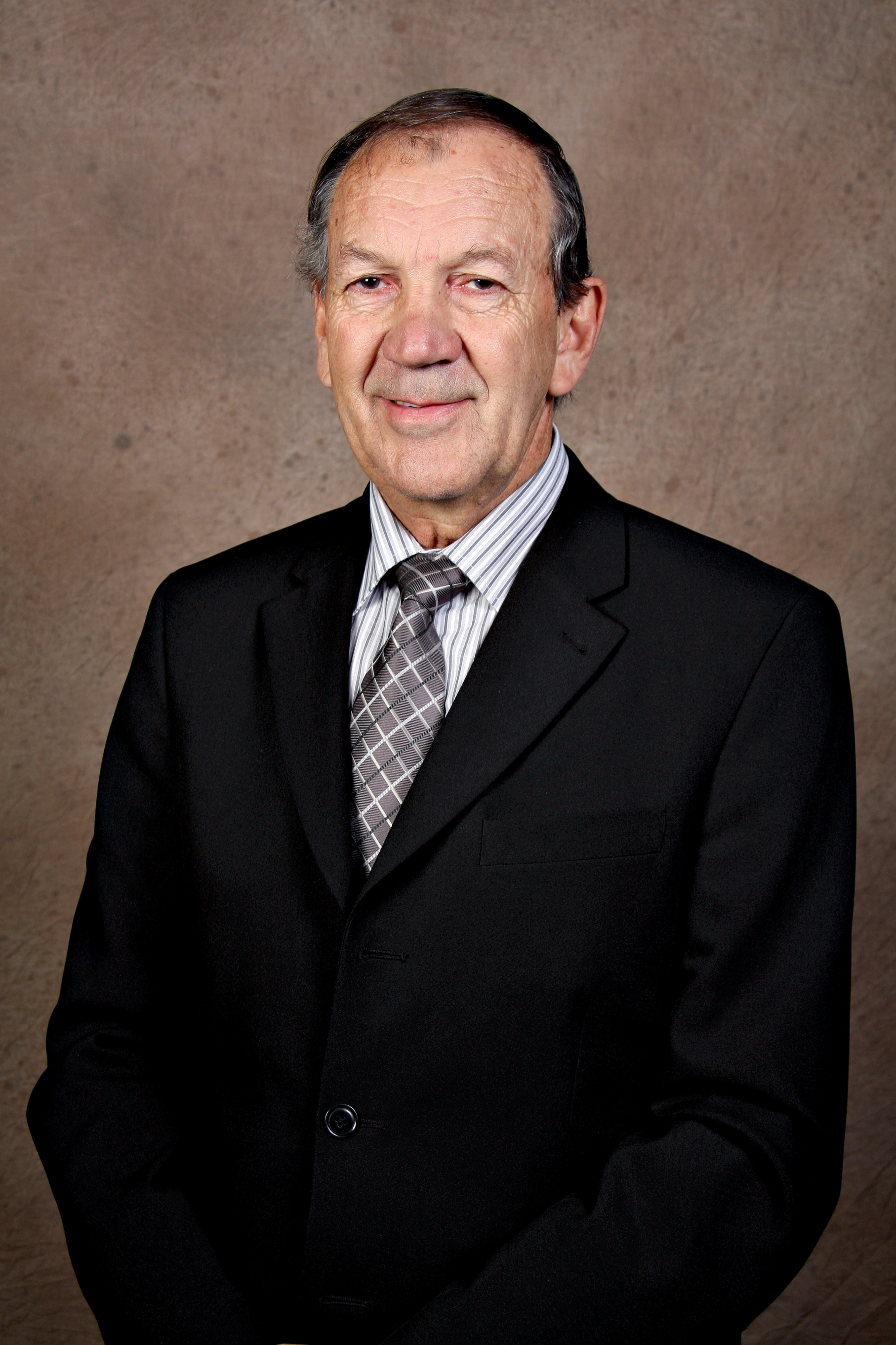
- Bosman in 2009

Shadow Minister for Agriculture, Forestry and Fisheries
- In office 14 May 2009 – 1 February 2012
- Leader: Helen Zille
- Preceded by: ???
- Succeeded by: Annette Steyn

Shadow Deputy Minister of Higher Education and Training
- In office 1 February 2012 – 8 May 2014
- Leader: Helen Zille
- Preceded by: Kraai van Niekerk
- Succeeded by: Yusuf Cassim

Member of Parliament for Mpumalanga
- In office 6 May 2009 – 8 May 2014

Personal details
- Born: 20 June 1941 (age 85)
- Party: Freedom Front Plus (2014- )
- Other political affiliations: Democratic Alliance
- Children: son Adee, daughter Anname

Lourens Bosman (born 20 June 1941) is a South African politician for the opposition Freedom Front Plus, and the former President of AgriSA. He served as a Member of Parliament for the official opposition Democratic Alliance, first as Shadow Minister of Agriculture, Forestry and Fisheries and then as Shadow Deputy Minister of Higher Education and Training, before defecting to the FF+ in 2014.

== Background ==
Dr. Bosman is married and has two children, a son Adee and a daughter Anname, with five grandchildren. He began his career by farming cattle and maize in 1968 and ran a Brahman Stud on his farms in the Warmbath district as well as practicing as a pharmacist in Lichtenburg from 1965 to 1978. He has also served on the IFAP Executive Committee, where he represented the IFAP on various International Conferences and working groups like Animal Health and Welfare and the Animal Identification and Traceability committees. He has been a Member of the International Federation of Agricultural Producers, (IFAP) since 2002, where he served as Vice-Chairperson and then as Chairperson of the Meats and Feeds, (IFAP) working group from 2004. Also, Dr. Bosman served his community in various other capacities, as President of the Warmbaths Agricultural and Industrial Show from 1986 - 1989, he played provincial hockey and represented Western Transvaal as well as Griqualand West, played first league cricket and social golf.

== Political career ==
Dr. Bosman has been a Member of the IFAP since 2002, where he served as Vice-Chairperson and then as Chairperson of the Meats and Feeds (IFAP) working group from 2004 to the present day. He has also dedicated a significant amount of time to Global Forum for Agricultural Research and is also one of the proponents of International Meat Conferences.

From 2000 to 2009, he was a Member of the Executive Committee of the Southern African Confederation of Agricultural Producers, and he represents SACAU on various international structures and working committees.

As a longstanding member of the DA, Dr. Bosman was elected to Parliament in 2009 and with his extensive knowledge of and experience in the agricultural sector, and was appointed as the Shadow Minister for Agriculture, Forestry and Fisheries. He then served as the Shadow Deputy Minister of Higher Education and Training from 2012 to 2014.

Bosman announced he was joining the smaller Freedom Front Plus in the run-up to the 2014 general election, but was not returned to parliament.

In 2016, Bosman was elected as a municipal councillor for the FF+ in Newcastle Local Municipality.
