= Mpowele Swathe =

South African politician

Mpowele Swathe MP
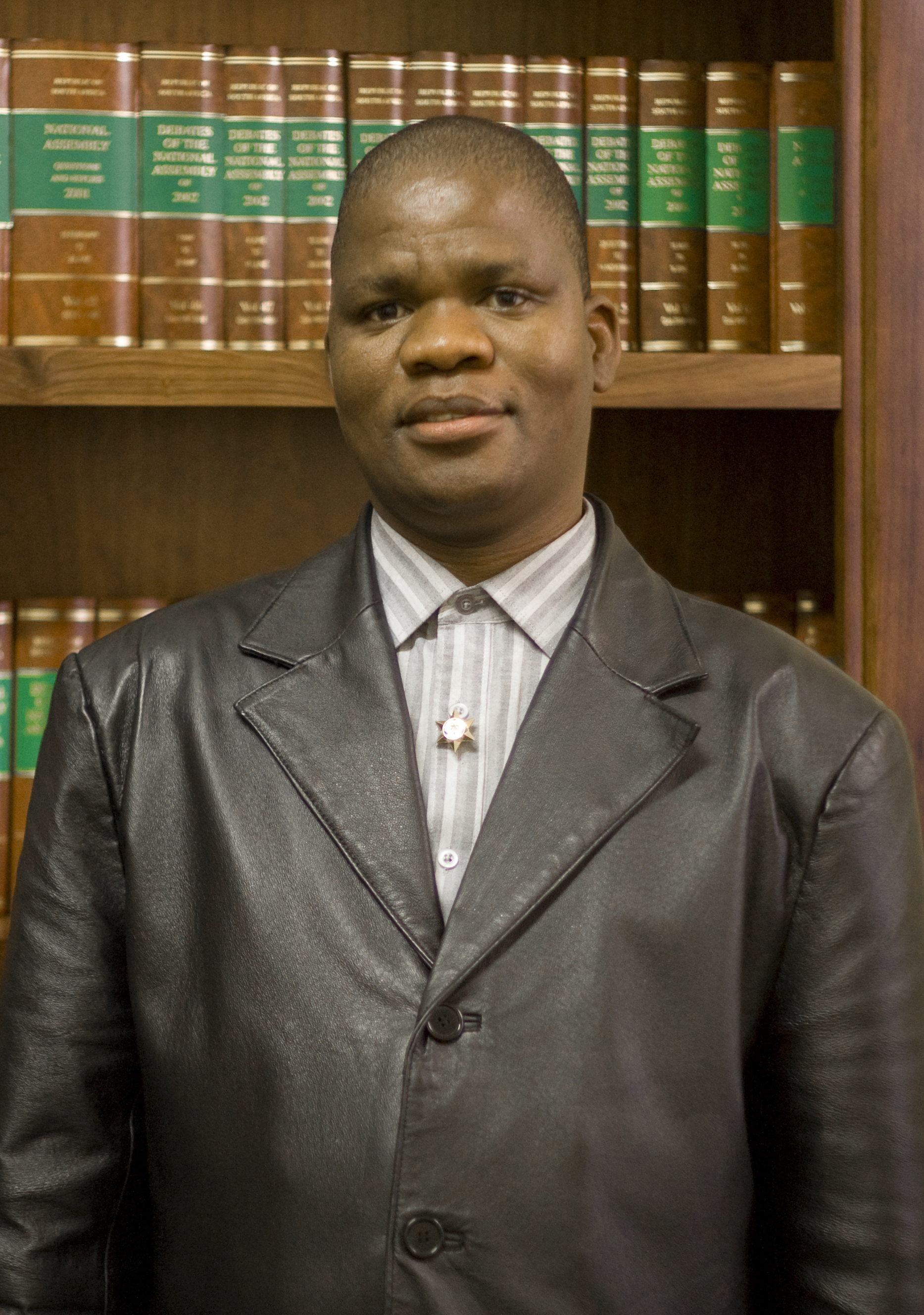

Shadow Minister of Rural Development and Land Reform
- In office 2009–2014
- Leader: Helen Zille
- Succeeded by: Thomas Walters

Member of Parliament for Limpopo
- In office 2004–2014

Personal details
- Born: Limpopo Province
- Party: Democratic Alliance

Mpowele Swathe is a South African politician, a former Member of Parliament with the Democratic Alliance, and the former Shadow Minister of Rural Development and Land Reform.

== Early life ==
Swathe was born in Limpopo, became part of Black Consciousness Movement in the late 1980s, and joined the United Democratic Front in 1990 and the African National Congress. He later qualified as a teacher in 1996.

== Parliamentary career ==
Swathe retired from politics in 1996 before joining the Democratic Party in 2000, getting elected to parliament in the 2004 South African general election. In March 2014 it became known that Swathe had joined the United Christian Democratic Party (UCDP), and his name appeared on both parties' lists for the 2014 general election. UCDP did not win any seats.

Political offices
| Preceded by ?? | Shadow Minister of Rural Development and Land Reform; 2009–present | Incumbent |
