= Lindiwe Mazibuko =

South African politician and activist (born 1980)

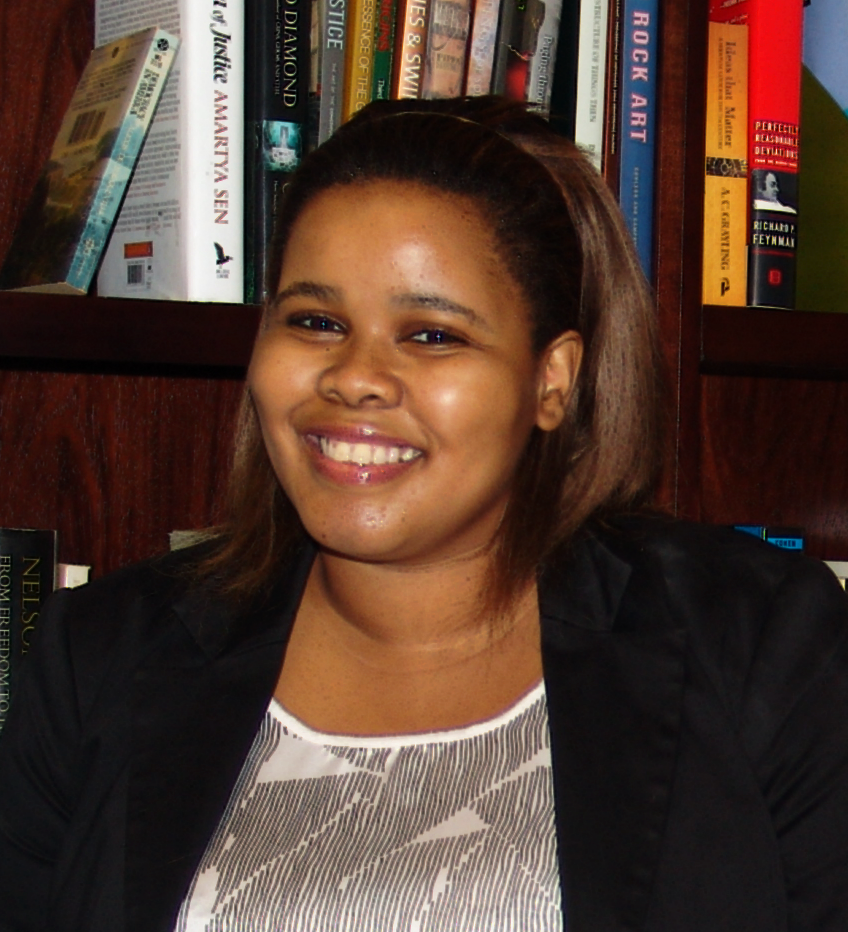
- Mazibuko in March 2011

Leader of the Opposition
- In office 27 October 2011 – 6 May 2014
- Leader: Helen Zille
- Preceded by: Athol Trollip
- Succeeded by: Mmusi Maimane

Member of the National Assembly

Assembly Member for KwaZulu-Natal
- In office 6 May 2009 – 21 May 2014

Personal details
- Born: Lindiwe Desire Mazibuko; 9 April 1980 (age 46) Manzini, Swaziland
- Party: Democratic Alliance
- Education: St. Mary's Diocesan School for Girls, Kloof
- Alma mater: University of KwaZulu-Natal; University of Cape Town; Harvard Kennedy School
- Website: mazibuko.org

Lindiwe Desire Mazibuko (born 9 April 1980) is a South African writer, activist, and former politician. Between 2011 and 2014 she was the parliamentary leader of the Democratic Alliance (DA) and the Leader of the Opposition in the National Assembly of South Africa. She served in the National Assembly through the Fourth Parliament until her resignation in May 2014.

A former DA political staffer, Mazibuko was sworn into the National Assembly following the May 2009 general election. She represented the DA in the KwaZulu-Natal constituency. From 2009 to 2011, she was the national spokesperson of the DA and served in the shadow cabinet of Athol Trollip, first as Shadow Deputy Minister of Communications from 2009 to 2010 and then as Shadow Minister of Rural Development and Land Reform from 2010 to 2011.

On 27 October 2011, after a fierce contest between Mazibuko and Trollip, the DA parliamentary caucus voted to appoint Mazibuko as the party's parliamentary leader, in which capacity she became Leader of the Opposition. She held that position for two-and-a-half years, working alongside DA federal leader Helen Zille. Although she was formerly regarded as Zille's protégé, their relationship became strained in 2013 after a disagreement over the DA's stance on black economic empowerment. As opposition leader Mazibuko sued the Speaker of the National Assembly, challenging the prevailing parliamentary rules for motions of no confidence.

After the May 2014 general election, Mazibuko resigned from the National Assembly, saying that she was taking a temporary hiatus from frontline politics to pursue postgraduate education. Thereafter she became the founder and chief executive officer of Futurelect, a non-profit organisation focused on civic education and skills development in African public service.

== Early life and education ==
Mazibuko was born on 9 April 1980 in Manzini, Swaziland to South African parents of Zulu heritage. Her father was a banker and her mother was a nurse; her grandfather had also lived in Swaziland, where he was an Anglican bishop. When Mazibuko was aged six, her family returned to South Africa, moving to Umlazi, a township outside Durban in the former Natal Province (now KwaZulu-Natal). To avoid the apartheid-era Bantu Education system, Mazibuko attended an independent Jewish primary school, Carmel College in Durban. In 1997 she matriculated at St. Mary's Diocesan School for Girls in Kloof, Durban, where she was a boarder.

Mazibuko had gone on international tours as a singer in her school choir, and she hoped to attend the Royal Scottish Academy of Music and Drama but wasn't able to afford it. Instead, she enrolled in a Bachelor of Music at the University of KwaZulu-Natal. After a year, bored by the course, she dropped out of university and lived in Europe for several years. For a period she lived in London, England, where she worked as a waitress and pursued a singing career. Upon her return to South Africa she studied the humanities at the University of Cape Town, graduating with a Bachelor of Arts in French, classics, and media studies in 2006 and Honours in political communication in 2007.

== Early political career: 2008–2009 ==
In 2007, Mazibuko wrote her Honours thesis on the Democratic Alliance (DA), intrigued by Helen Zille's recent ascension to replace Tony Leon as DA leader. During her research, Mazibuko warmed to Zille and identified with the DA's policy platform, realising that the DA "wasn't this big monster that everybody assumes it to be". In particular, she supported the DA's "unashamedly pro-poor" policy outlook.

She later said that both she and her family were surprised to find her in agreement with the DA: the only political statement she had ever seen her father make was calling amandla to Nelson Mandela, and she felt that there was a presumption that black South Africans should support Mandela's African National Congress (ANC). However, Mazibuko felt that she "could no longer in good conscience" support the ANC under President Thabo Mbeki. On the racial point, she argued in 2009 that "the DA is definitely a white party" but would only remain unrepresentative for as long as black South Africans refused to join it.

Shortly after she completed her thesis and graduated, Mazibuko was hired as a researcher in the DA's parliamentary caucus, having responded to a job advert in the Sunday Times. After less than a year as a researcher, she was appointed as the party's national media liaison officer in 2008. Later the same year, she applied to stand as a parliamentary candidate for the DA in the upcoming April 2009 general election. The Financial Mail described her as "efficient but politically untested". Labelled a "star performer" by Zille, Mazibuko was ranked third on the DA's party list in the KwaZulu-Natal constituency in 2009.

== Shadow Cabinet: 2009–2011 ==
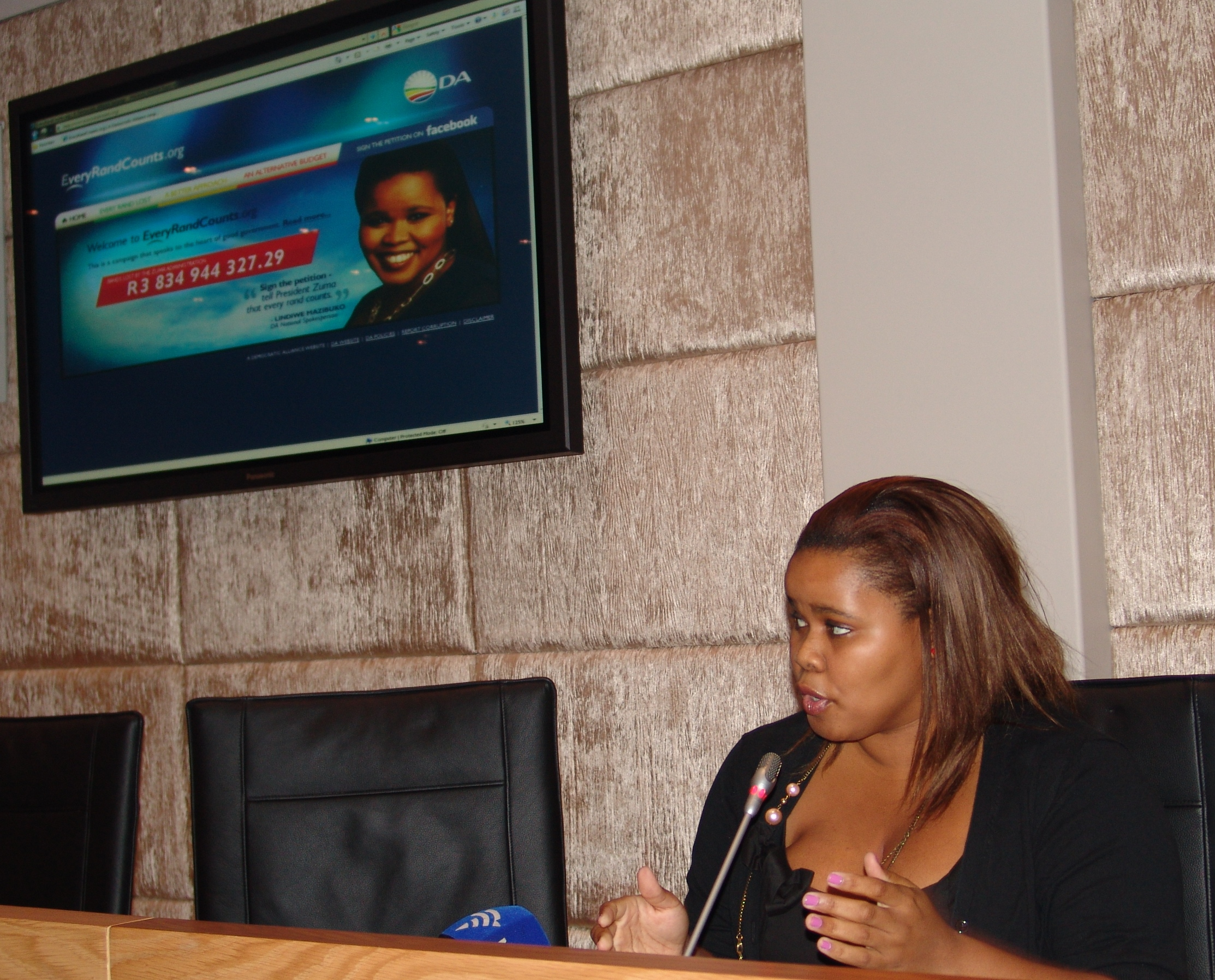
Mazibuko briefing the press as DA national spokesperson, February 2011

Pursuant to the April 2009 election, Mazibuko secured election to a seat in the National Assembly, the lower house of the South African Parliament, and was assigned to the DA's constituency office in North Durban. In the DA's post-election shadow cabinet she was appointed as Shadow Deputy Minister of Communications, under Shadow Minister Niekie van den Berg, and as the DA's new national spokesperson. The shadow cabinet was announced jointly by Zille, the DA's leader, and Athol Trollip, the DA's parliamentary leader; in an unusual arrangement, Trollip served as Leader of the Opposition in Parliament while Zille was serving in provincial government as the Premier of the Western Cape.

Within weeks of the election, Mandy Rossouw reported that Mazibuko, aged 29, was a "rising star" in the DA, regarded as the party's presumptive future leader. During the same period the Mail & Guardian named her as one of its 200 Young South Africans of 2009. Verashni Pillay said that her political rise was facilitated by her public speaking skills, thick skin and media savvy, and "a good dose of favour with a few powerful people" in the DA leadership. Tim Harris, Mazibuko's colleague, said that she benefitted from "a real ability to construct convincing arguments at speed".

In September 2010, Trollip reshuffled the shadow cabinet, retaining Mazibuko as national spokesperson while also promoting her to replace Mpowele Swathe as Shadow Minister of Rural Development, Land Reform and Poverty Alleviation; Annette Steyn was appointed as her deputy. In the next year, Mazibuko was a prominent feature in the DA's 2011 local elections campaign, and she appeared on the party's election posters alongside two senior DA leaders, Zille and Patricia de Lille.

== Leader of the Opposition: 2011–2014 ==
=== Election ===
==== Campaign ====
Ahead of the regular internal midterm election in the DA's parliamentary caucus, Mazibuko announced that she would challenge Trollip, a white DA stalwart and the party's provincial leader in the Eastern Cape, for the position of DA parliamentary leader and Leader of the Opposition. She announced her candidacy during a press conference in Cape Town on 27 September 2011, flanked by her two running mates; Wilmot James would stand for the caucus chairperson position and Watty Watson would stand to become the party's new chief whip. Mazibuko said that the trio collectively represented the best of the DA: "a combination of experience, expertise, and a vibrant new vision for the future".

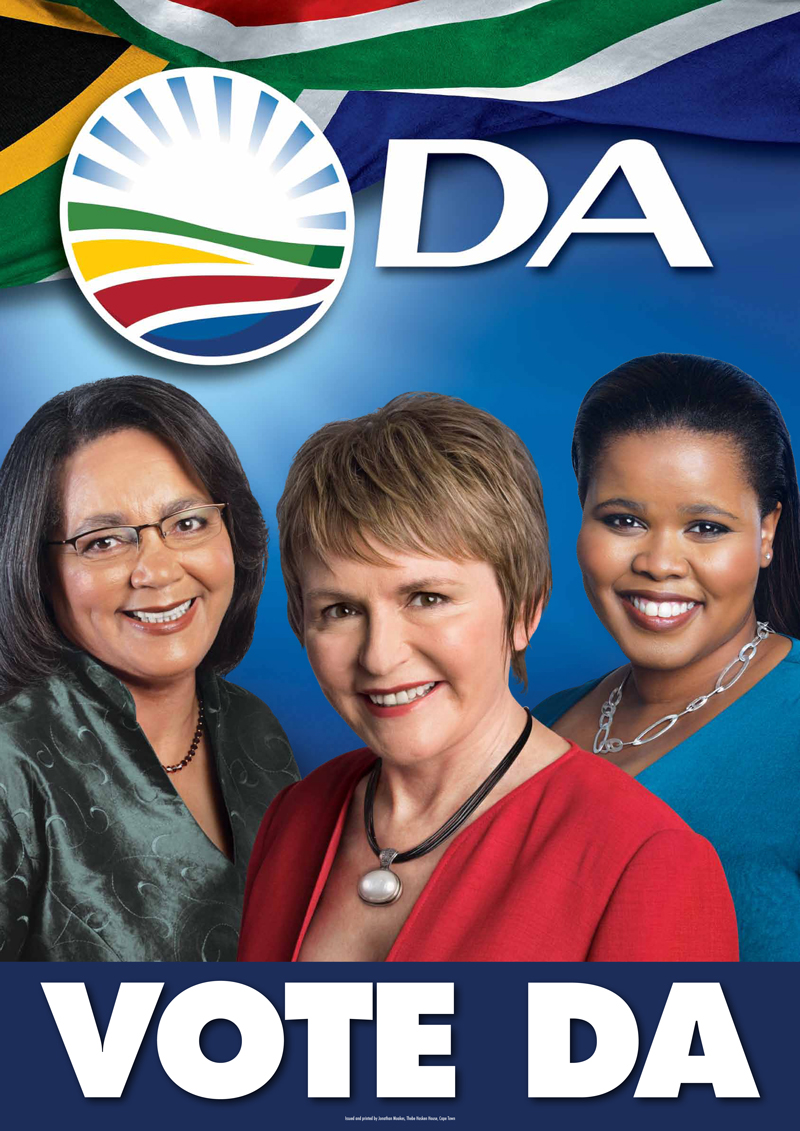
The DA's 2011 election poster, which raised Mazibuko's public profile

Mazibuko was commended for her strategic choice of running mates, James and Watson being experienced DA parliamentarians, and in other respects too she ran a "savvy" and professional campaign, with David Maynier as her campaign manager. In something of a departure from precedent, the campaign was overtly public, rather than confined to internal appeals to other parliamentarians; Mazibuko later said that she taken this approach intentionally, hoping to foster a culture of more democratic leadership selection in the DA.

She said that the differences between her and Trollip were "methodological" rather than ideological or policy-related, and the primary theme of her campaign was the DA's need for a younger, more energetic, and more racially representative leadership. Eusebius McKaiser argued that, Mazibuko's "infectious" enthusiasm notwithstanding, her public statements were overly focused on "vague, abstract values or responses to her identity", which he said neglected "substantive policy and intellectual detail in favour of the quick returns on a crisp sound bite".

==== Endorsements ====
DA politicians who publicly endorsed Mazibuko's candidacy included James Masango, Marta Wenger, Natasha Michael, Stevens Mokgalapa, and Patricia de Lille, the Mayor of Cape Town, who said that Mazibuko had "proved herself an exceptional leader and a formidable opponent of the ANC". There were rumours that the DA's federal chairperson, James Selfe, campaigned for Mazibuko behind the scenes, urging Trollip to withdraw from the race and allow her to take office unopposed. Her candidacy was also linked to a group of DA prodigies around Ryan Coetzee, a DA strategist who had become one of the foremost proponents of diversifying and modernising the party. Coetzee had lost the parliamentary leadership election to Trollip in 2009, leading insiders to nickname Mazibuko's campaign as "Ryan's revenge". This factional dimension, along with the public nature of the campaign, resulted in a fierce internal contest; in her memoirs, Zille wrote that, "There was blood on the floor before a single vote had been cast".

There was also a widespread perception that Zille supported Mazibuko and even lobbied overtly on her behalf, sharing Coetzee's putative view that Mazibuko's candidacy presented an opportunity "to rid her party of the old guard". In this view Zille had groomed Mazibuko for the parliamentary leadership, propelling Mazibuko's rapid political ascent by appointing her as spokesperson and featuring her on the DA's 2011 election posters. Zille later admitted that she "used up some of my political capital at the time encouraging people to vote for Lindiwe". According to Zille, she initially discouraged Mazibuko from standing, recognising that she had the requisite "intellect and political instinct" but nonetheless believing her to lack the experience needed for the job. Conversely, Zille's critics – Masizole Mnqasela chief among them – alleged that Mazibuko's inexperience was appealing to Zille because it would make her more pliant and less of an obstacle to Zille's control of the parliamentary caucus. A Mail & Guardian editorial urged that Mazibuko "should not be used to remote control the party in Parliament. If she wins, the DA should be serious about letting her lead and not make this a cosmetic transformation."

The midterm election was held on 27 October 2011 and Mazibuko won comfortably. The vote count was not released to the public, but the Mail & Guardian reported that Mazibuko had won by a margin of about 50 votes to Trollip's 31. She retained Trollip's shadow cabinet until February 2012, when she announced a reshuffle of the shadow cabinet.

=== Motion of no confidence ===
During her time as Leader of the Opposition, Mazibuko's counterpart in the ANC was President Jacob Zuma, a controversial figure and bête noire of the opposition. In November 2012, Mazibuko announced that she would table a parliamentary motion of no confidence in Zuma and his cabinet on behalf of the DA and other opposition parties. The primary trigger for the motion was the Nkandlagate scandal, but the parties also cited the Marikana massacre, recent credit rating downgrades, and political corruption as among their reasons for bringing the motion. However, the vote on the motion did not go ahead, because Parliament's programming committee deadlocked on the question of allowing a debate on the motion. Mazibuko led the consortium of opposition parties to the Western Cape High Court, where they attempted to force the Speaker of the National Assembly, Max Sisulu, to break the deadlock and permit a debate.

The case went to the Constitutional Court of South Africa as Mazibuko v Sisulu, and the apex court's 2013 judgment ruled as unconstitutional the National Assembly's prevailing rules for motions of no confidence. However, by the time new rules were passed in February 2014, Mazibuko had abandoned her original motion of no confidence, saying instead that she would seek to use Parliament's stronger power of impeachment. The Mail & Guardian teased her for seeking to use "an imaginary weapon" – parliamentary removal by a minority caucus – to hold Zuma accountable.

=== Image and political style ===
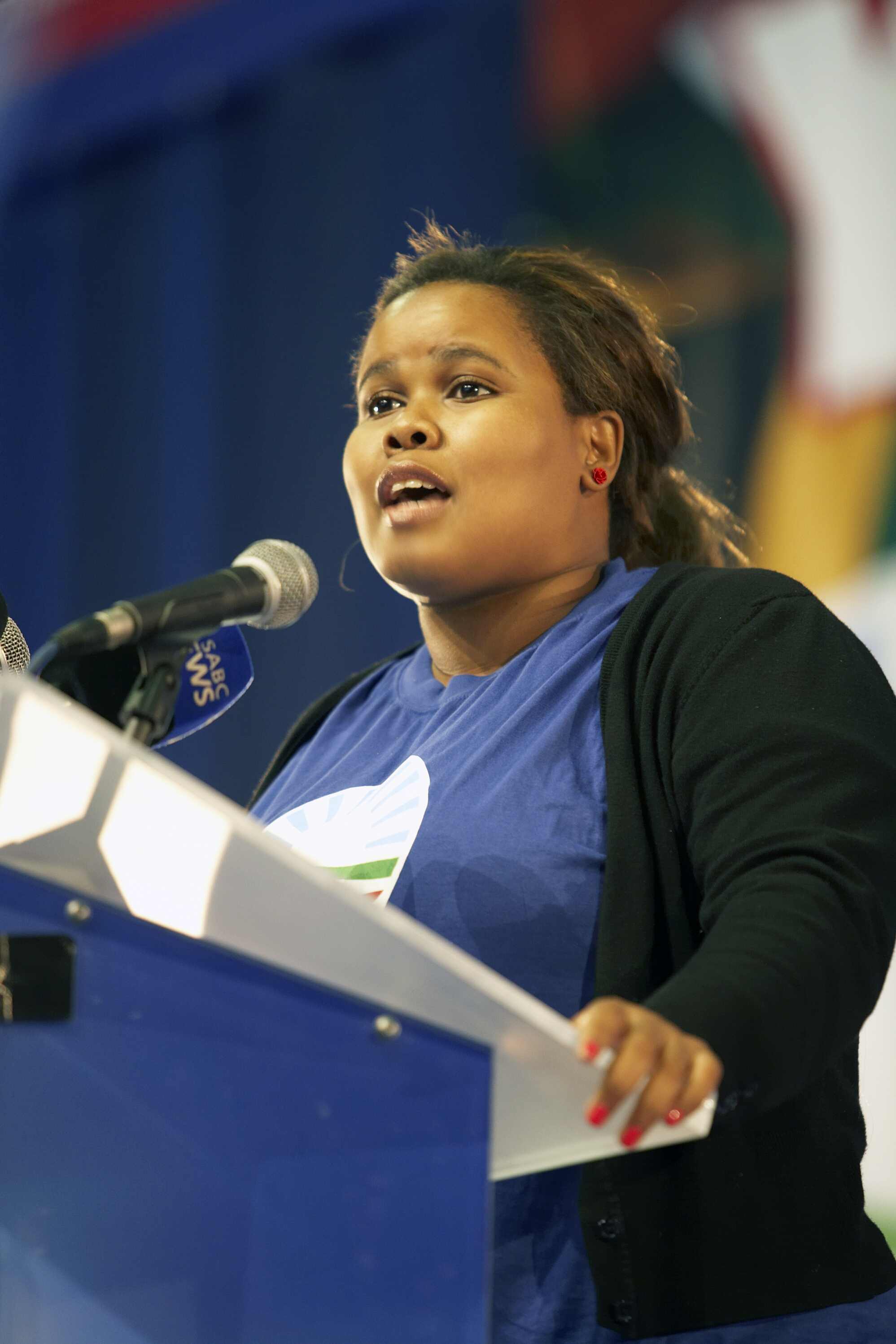
Mazibuko addressing a DA rally in May 2011

Mazibuko was the DA's first black parliamentary leader and South Africa's first black Leader of the Opposition, and her election received international attention. She attended the 8th Women's Forum for the Economy and Society in 2012 as a "Rising Talent". In 2013 she was named by the World Economic Forum as a Young Global Leader and by Forbes as one of 20 Young Power Women in Africa. Inside South Africa, however, Mazibuko was frequently derided and undermined by opposing politicians. She later said that "the low point" of her parliamentary career "was being sexually harassed and insulted by the ANC in Parliament".

Her racial identity was a common point of derision, with critics suggesting that her educational and class background undermined her claim to a genuine or representative black identity. Discourse in this regard predated Mazibuko's election as parliamentary leader; in February 2011, for example, ANC politician Blade Nzimande had called her a "coconut" during a parliamentary debate. It mounted during and after her 2011 election campaign: the ANC's Jackson Mthembu described Mazibuko as "so naive when it comes to African traditions that she cannot relate to them", and Mnqasela, Mazibuko's own colleague, faced disciplinary charges in the DA for allegedly saying, "If you close your eyes and listen to Lindiwe Mazibuko when she speaks, you would say a white person is talking to you". In December 2013, when Mazibuko appeared on a special South African edition of the BBC’s Question Time, she was called a "house nigger" by another panel member, Andile Mngxitama. Her "distinctly plummy English accent" was often noted, and Stephen Grootes suggested that Mazibuko's accent – along with other class markers – was a genuine electoral liability insofar as it undermined her "mass appeal".

Other public insults to Mazibuko related to her age or sex. During parliamentary debates, ANC representatives commented on her appearance: among other examples, John Jeffery teased her for her weight, Jeremy Cronin analysed her hairstyle, and Buti Manamela threatened to call the "fashion police" on her during a debate on the budget vote. The overall ANC caucus also accused Mazibuko of being dressed in an "inappropriate manner" in an official statement released by the office of the Chief Whip of the National Assembly. In May 2011, Julius Malema had famously refused to take place in a televised debate with Mazibuko because he viewed her as nothing more than Zille's "tea girl", and the tea girl moniker was frequently revived during her term as Leader of the Opposition. By February 2014, Mazibuko told the English Guardian that in politics she had "experienced sexism of every different kind", including various "coded insults designed to make me feel small", but viewed the attacks an indication that she was viewed as a political threat. Some observers suggested that the ANC's dismissive attitude towards Mazibuko gave her a political advantage.

However, others had genuine concerns about Mazibuko's relative inexperience. Zille later said that Mazibuko's elevation had been premature, describing her as a talented politician but hindered by inexperience. She also suggested that Mazibuko's political effectiveness had been hindered by her reputation as Zille's protégé. During her last year as opposition leader, in June 2013, the Sunday Independent printed a detailed piece on Mazibuko's leadership style and status in the DA caucus, reporting that, while her supporters considered her organised and effective, others DA politicians were prepared to vote her out of office, regarding her as autocratic and lacking in self-assurance. In her memoirs Zille alleged that Mazibuko had members of the DA caucus address her as "Madam Leader".

=== Relationship with Helen Zille ===
Although Mazibuko had risen to her office as Zille's protégé, the pair had a public disagreement in November 2013 after the DA parliamentary caucus, under Mazibuko's leadership, voted in favour of two black economic empowerment (BEE) bills tabled by the ANC. Zille intervened publicly and instructed the caucus to withdraw its support for the legislation, which contained a form of race-based affirmative action that Zille said was incompatible with the DA's basic principles. She said publicly that the vote had been a "plane crash", that "there was absolutely no excuse for the DA supporting Verwoerdian measures like that", and that Mazibuko "got it completely wrong". She also excoriated the caucus in an email to Mazibuko and other caucus leaders, which was leaked to the press. Mazibuko nonetheless told the press that she continued to support the legislation and race-based affirmative action more broadly. She said that both were compatible with the DA's liberalism, arguing that, "The two tenets of liberalism are individual freedom and social responsibility". Zille later said that Mazibuko had told her to "butt out of caucus affairs".

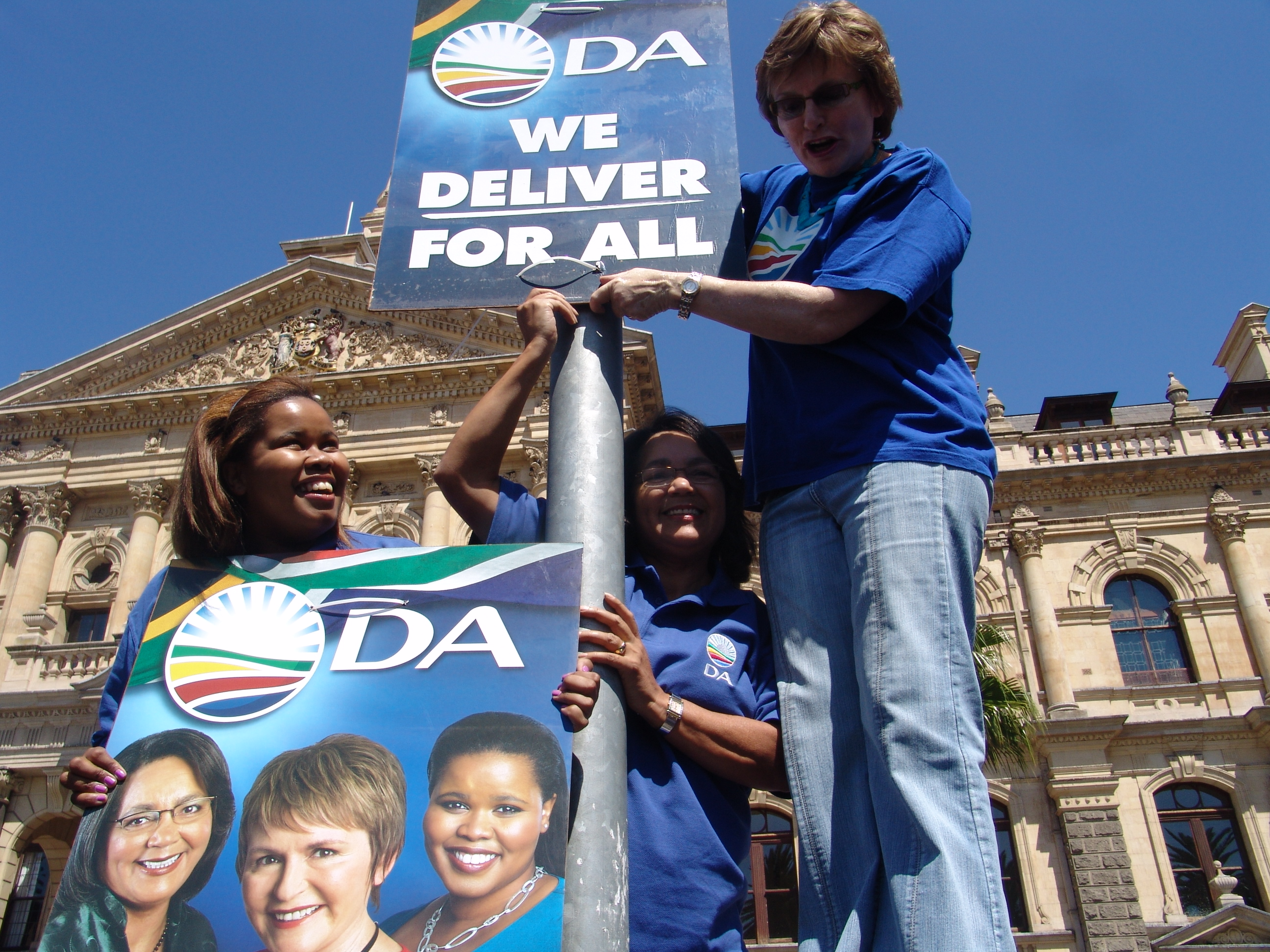
Mazibuko, Patricia de Lille, and Helen Zille hanging campaign posters on the Grand Parade, Cape Town, March 2011

JJ Tabane said that Zille's intervention in the BEE vote constituted a "humiliation" for Mazibuko, and, even in Zille's own account, it had lasting effects on Mazibuko's relationship with Zille. By early 2014 there were also reports that Zille and her allies had begun to transfer their support from Mazibuko to Mmusi Maimane, who increasingly threatened Mazibuko's status as Zille's heir apparent. At the end of her term as Leader of the Opposition, Mazibuko said that her relationship with Zille was "relaxed" and that they continued to meet for breakfast every week. However, in later years, she accused Zille of failing to support her and even of trying to "stifle" her political potential.

In Zille's account, published in Not Without A Fight, her relationship with Mazibuko deteriorated because of Mazibuko's ambitions to replace her as DA federal leader. In particular, she accused Mazibuko of undermining the relationship by erecting a "Berlin Wall" between her parliamentary office and Zille's party office; among other things, Zille said that she attempted to centralise party communications in her office, cancelled joint press conferences with Zille, refused to share an office with Zille in the Houses of Parliament, and refused to work with Zille's chief of staff, Geordin Hill-Lewis.

=== Resignation ===
In the May 2014 general election, Mazibuko stood for re-election to her parliamentary seat, ranked first on the DA's party list for KwaZulu-Natal and third on its national party list. She was briefly absent from the election campaign in March 2014 while recovering from an emergency surgery, but she returned to work in April. On 10 May 2014, the Electoral Commission released the results of the election, which were positive for the DA and which would allow Mazibuko to carry on as Leader of the Opposition. However, the following day, the Sunday Times published an exclusive interview in which Mazibuko announced that she would decline to return to her seat in the new parliamentary term. She said that she was taking a sabbatical from politics to complete a one-year mid-career master's degree at Harvard University in Boston, Massachusetts. In her account she had made the decision to leave during a September 2013 visit to Yale University, where she had recognised that such a sabbatical would allow her to "serve the DA and South Africa better" upon her return.

Mazibuko's resignation, after only one term in Parliament, sparked public debate about black leaders' prospects for success in the DA. Mazibuko, who said that she would remain a DA member, denied that the party's internal politics had influenced her design to resign. However, several observers linked her departure to the apparent deterioration in her relationship with Zille and especially their disagreement over BEE. Former DA strategist Gareth van Onselen published an article entitled "The real reasons Mazibuko left the DA parliamentary leadership", which claimed that Mazibuko had been "viciously and brutally maligned and alienated" by Zille's allies and that she had become particularly marginalised as Maimane rose in Zille's favour. Gavin Davis, the DA's communications director, implied that Mazibuko had perpetuated this account of events, pointing out that she was close to van Onselen and had not publicly refuted his claims.

Conversely to van Onselen's account, Zille and her supporters suggested that Mazibuko was leaving due to her own declining popularity in the DA caucus. Zille told Die Burger that Mazibuko was pursuing her "Plan B", Harvard, in the knowledge that she would have lost her office anyway if she stood for re-election as the DA's parliamentary leader. Other DA sources gave similar accounts to the Mail & Guardian, saying either that Mazibuko was set to lose the internal election or that her victory would come at the cost of a fierce and divisive contest, likely with Mmusi Maimane. According to one report, which Zille denied, Zille used the opportunity of the DA's next federal executive meeting to complain at length about Mazibuko and attack her record, saying that she had "made" Mazibuko and "saved" her from several gaffes. She later complained about the manner in which Mazibuko had "stage-managed" her resignation announcement.

== Later career ==
=== Civil society ===
In May 2015, Mazibuko graduated with a Master of Public Administration from the Harvard Kennedy School, where she was a John F. Kennedy Fellow and Edward S. Mason Fellow. She spent the second half of 2015 as a resident fellow at the Harvard Institute of Politics, where she convened a reading group on institution-building in post-conflict democratic transitions. In 2016 she was a fellow at Stellenbosch University's Institute for Advanced Studies and a participant in the Munich Young Leaders Program, a joint initiative of the Munich Security Conference and the Körber-Stiftung. Thereafter she moved to London, England, where in 2017 she joined the board of the Apolitical Group.

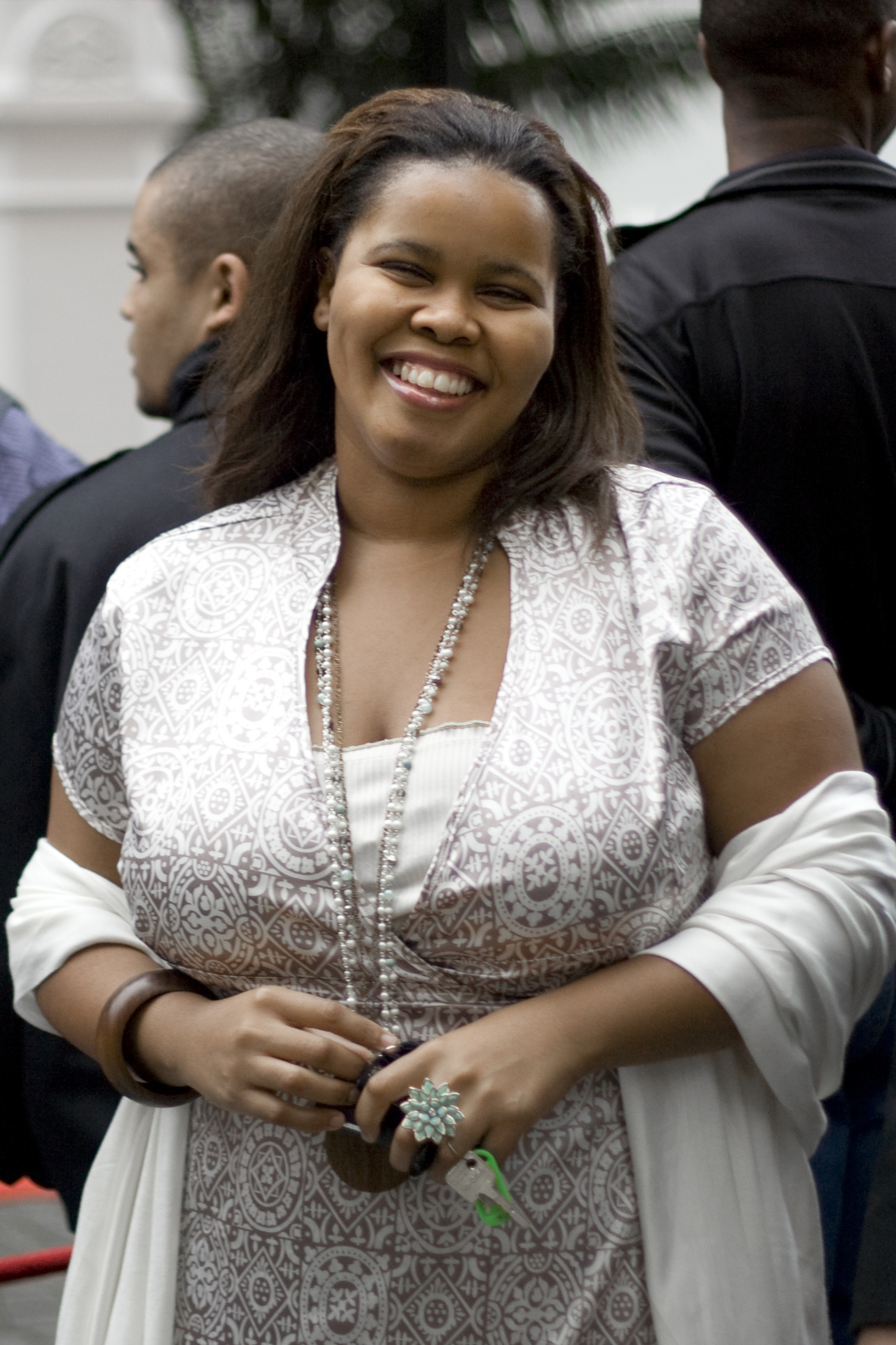
Mazibuko in July 2009

In 2018 Mazibuko co-founded the Apolitical Academy, a partnership between the Apolitical Group and Swedish financier Daniel Sachs which aimed to provide non-partisan training to prospective public servants. In June 2018, Mazibuko announced that the academy had accepted its inaugural cohort of 25 Public Service Fellows, who would participate in a nine-month training programme; she ran the pilot programme from Johannesburg. In subsequent years the Apolitical Academy became Futurelect, a skills development non-profit focused on ethical leadership in African public service, and Mazibuko became its chief executive officer.

In September 2023, ahead of the May 2024 South African general election, she launched Futurelect's new civic education programme, which she said aimed to mobilise young voters by reaching over a million South Africans. As part of that programme in March 2024, in collaboration with M&C Saatchi Abel, the organisation launched the Futurelect Civic Education App, a voter education vehicle for young voters.

While these projects were ongoing, Mazibuko returned to Harvard in the spring of 2019, invited by R. Nicholas Burns to serve as the Fisher Family Fellow in the Future of Diplomacy Project at the Belfer Center for Science and International Affairs. In 2023 she began a two-year programme as a member of the inaugural cohort of Keseb Democracy Fellows. She also writes a weekly column for the South African Sunday Times.

=== Politics ===
Within months of Mazibuko's arrival at Harvard in 2014, there were reports that she had been approached by a grouping of DA politicians, including deputy federal chairperson Makashule Gana, who had encouraged her to challenge Zille for the DA federal leadership at the party's upcoming federal congress. Speculation in this vein escalated in April 2015, when Zille announced that she would not stand for re-election as federal leader. At the time Mazibuko released a statement saying that she would not enter the race to succeed Zille and would make her re-entry to politics "when the time is right". Mmusi Maimane, who had succeeded Mazibuko as the party's parliamentary leader, went on to gain election as federal leader.

In later years, Mazibuko remained ambivalent about returning to frontline politics. In 2018, launching the Apolitical Academy, she said of such a return that, "I'm waiting for the right time, but I'm not biding that time"; she said that she preferred to change the status quo than to return to party politics and merely "feel miserable about the status quo". She also became increasingly critical of her former party, the DA. In 2016 she had famously remarked upon the dominance of white men in what she called the DA's "brains trust", describing the party's leading strategists as "highly disconnected men callously strutting about social media like a law unto themselves". By 2018, she said that she was no longer a formal member of the DA, though she still considered herself a DA supporter.

After Maimane resigned from the party leadership in 2019, she warned that his departure – and the departure of other black politicians like Herman Mashaba – reflected the paucity of the party's internal democracy and demonstrated that the DA was "captured by a certain faction". She was a vocal critic of Maimane's successor, John Steenhuisen; in October 2021 she said that she and Steenhuisen had formerly been friends but that, since becoming DA leader, he had become "someone who lives in an echo chamber and does not let in people with contrary views", and in March 2023 she condemned the "tone deaf, power drunk, ignorant hubris of current leadership" in the DA.

== Personal life ==
She speaks Zulu and Swati as well as English.

Political offices
Preceded by Dene Smuts	Shadow Deputy Minister of Communications; 2009–2010	Succeeded by Niekie van den Berg
Preceded by Donald Lee	National Spokesperson of the Democratic Alliance; 2009–2011	Succeeded by Mmusi Maimane
Preceded by Athol Trollip	Parliamentary Leader of the Opposition; 27 October 2011 - 21 May 2014	Succeeded by Mmusi Maimane
