= 2020 Democratic Alliance Federal Congress =

Elective conference held in 2020

- 31 October – 1 November 2020
- Turnout: 88.6%
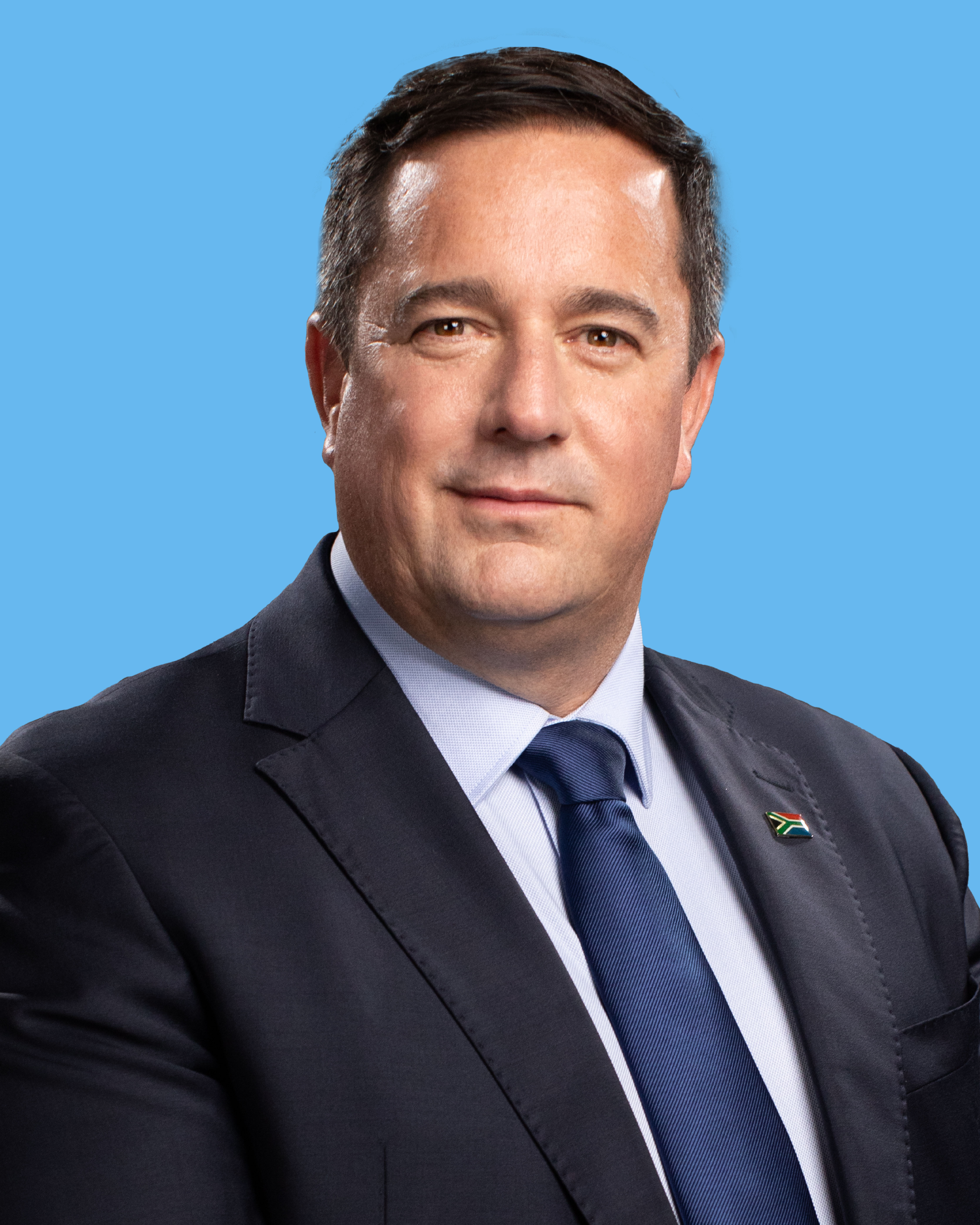

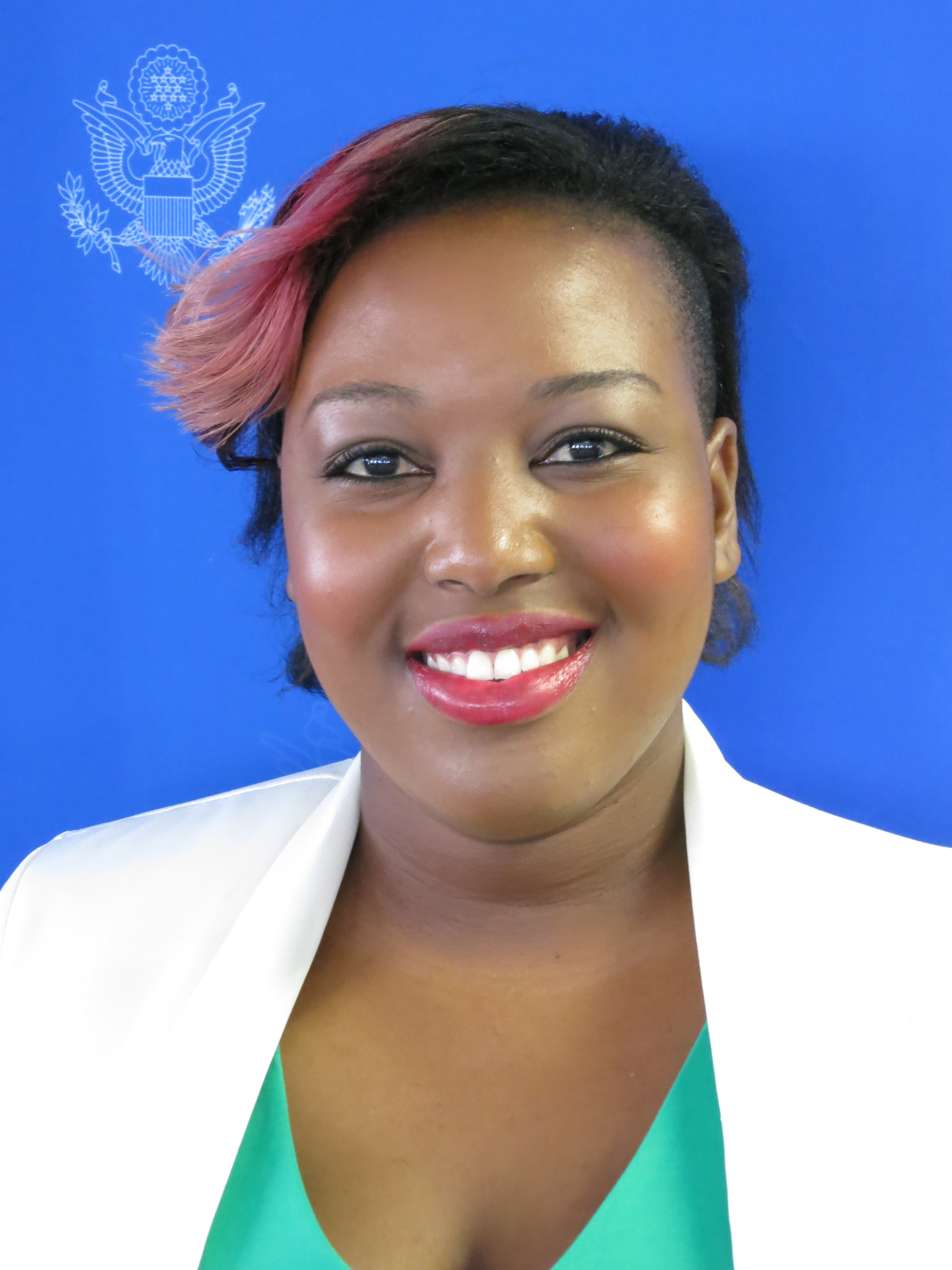
| Candidate | John Steenhuisen | Mbali Ntuli |
| Popular vote | 1,443 | 361 |
| Percentage | 79.99% | 20.01% |
leader before election
John Steenhuisen (interim)
Elected leader
John Steenhuisen

The Democratic Alliance (DA) held its leadership conference virtually between 31 October and 1 November 2020. It was originally scheduled to be held in May 2020, but was postponed due to the COVID-19 outbreak. The previous congress was held in 2018. In October 2019, then-party leader Mmusi Maimane announced that the party would seek to hold a policy conference and early elective congress in 2020. Maimane and former party chair Athol Trollip have since resigned from their positions and the DA. The party elected John Steenhuisen and Ivan Meyer as their interim successors, respectively.

== Background ==
Mmusi Maimane was re-elected as leader of the Democratic Alliance in 2018. He led the party to see its first decline in its history at the May 2019 general election. This, as a result, caused factionalism and leadership uncertainty within the party. Maimane established a panel consisting of former party leader Tony Leon, former party CEO Ryan Coetzee and Capitec founder Michiel le Roux to come up with an independent report detailing the faults and conflicts within the party. Federal Council chair James Selfe announced in June 2019 that he would retire in October of the same year, opening up a senior leadership position within the party.

As Selfe's retirement neared, multiple candidates declared their candidacies. Former party leader Helen Zille announced on 4 October 2019 that she would run for the post. DA CEO Paul Boughey stepped down on 17 October. The DA's Federal Council gathered on 19–20 October and elected Zille as the party's chair on 20 October 2019. She defeated Athol Trollip, Mike Waters and Thomas Walters. At the gathering, Maimane proposed that the party should head to an early elective congress and policy conference in 2020. At the same meeting, the panel's report was discussed. The report recommended that senior leadership should resign. Johannesburg mayor Herman Mashaba announced his resignation the next day due to irreconcilable differences with party leadership following Zille's return.

On 23 October, Mmusi Maimane resigned as party leader. Party chair Athol Trollip also stepped down. Both positions were consequently vacant, and the party set 17 November as the date to elect interim leadership.

In the run-up to 17 November, both vacant posts became contested. Newly-elected parliamentary leader John Steenhuisen, Western Cape DA provincial leader Bonginkosi Madikizela, and Gauteng MPL Makashule Gana, all declared their candidacies for interim leader. Deputy federal chair Ivan Meyer, DA Women's Network leader Nomafrench Mbombo, Gauteng MPL Khume Ramulifho, and Buffalo City councillor Dharmesh Dhaya announced that they would contest the election for interim chair.

Madikizela soon withdrew his candidacy and Dhaya followed. On 17 November, Steenhuisen was elected interim leader with Meyer as interim chair. They vied for full-terms at the party's congress.

=== Postponement ===
The party's elective congress was set to be held in May 2020, but this was postponed due to the COVID-19 pandemic in South Africa. The policy conference, that was supposed to be held in April 2020, was also postponed. Steenhuisen temporarily suspended all campaign activities on 16 March. Moodey and Ntuli soon followed. In April 2020, the party announced it was considering holding a virtual policy conference. It was agreed to by the party's leadership structures and held on 29 May 2020.

In May 2020, some party officials proposed that the elective conference be held virtually in October 2020, however, this was met with disapproval since critics argued that it would favourable to Steenhuisen's campaign. The party's Federal Executive, highest decision-making body, approved the decision on 17 May 2020. In July 2020, the Federal Council, second-highest body, endorsed the proposal and announced that it would be held between 31 October and 1 November 2020.

== Candidates for federal leader ==
=== Declared ===
| Portrait | Name | Offices held | Province | Announcement date |
|---|---|---|---|---|
| | Mbali Ntuli (born 1988) | Federal Youth Leader of the DA (2013–2014); Member of the KwaZulu-Natal Legislature (2019–present; 2014–2018) | KwaZulu-Natal | 7 February 2020 |
| | John Steenhuisen (born 1976) | Interim Federal Leader of the DA (2019–present); Leader of the Opposition (2019–present); Member of the National Assembly (2011–present) | KwaZulu-Natal | 15 February 2020 |

Gauteng DA leader John Moodey was a candidate for federal leader, but he resigned from the party in September 2020.

=== Declined ===
- Makashule Gana, incumbent Member of the Gauteng Provincial Legislature and former youth leader of the party. He challenged Steenhuisen for the position of interim leader in November 2019.
- Bonginkosi Madikizela, incumbent provincial leader of the party in the Western Cape (running for re-election)

== Results ==
On 1 November 2020, John Steenhuisen was announced as the new federal leader with Ivan Meyer as the federal chairperson.

Refiloe Nt'sekhe, Anton Bredell and Jacques Smalle were announced as the first, second and third deputy federal chairpersons, respectively. Annelie Lotriet was unsuccessful in her campaign.

Helen Zille was re-elected as chairperson of the Federal Council, defeating Gauteng DA provincial chairperson Michael Moriarty. Thomas Walters and James Masango were announced as two her deputies. They were elected unopposed.

Dion George was re-elected unopposed as federal finance chairperson.
