= 2026 Democratic Alliance Federal Congress =

National elective conference

2026 Democratic Alliance leadership election
- 11–12 April 2026
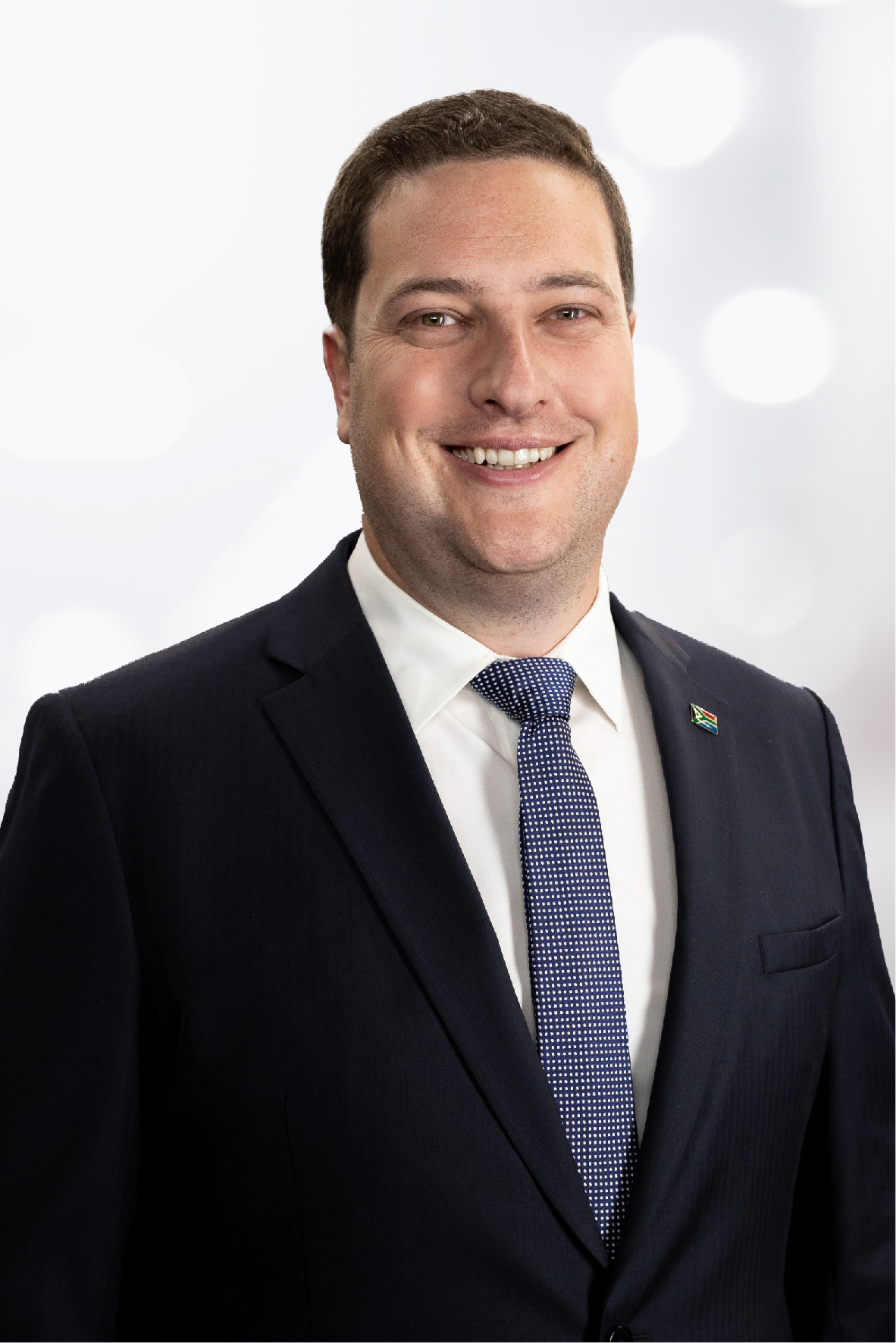

Candidate	Geordin Hill-Lewis	Sibusiso Dyonase
Party	DA	DA
Result	Elected	Not elected
Previous Leader
John Steenhuisen
Elected leader
Geordin Hill-Lewis

The Democratic Alliance held a national elective conference to determine its federal leadership on 11 and 12 April 2026. Nominations for leadership positions were open from 27 February to 23 March 2026. The results were announced on 12 April 2026.

Then Federal leader John Steenhuisen announced on 4 February 2026 that he would not seek another term as federal leader at the congress. Helen Zille also declined to run for another term as chairperson of the party's Federal Council. Cape Town mayor Geordin Hill-Lewis and Sedibeng councilor Sibusiso Dyonase contested the leadership.

Hill-Lewis was elected DA leader with Solly Msimanga elected as the party's federal chairperson. Solly Malatsi, Cilliers Brink and Siviwe Gwarube were elected as the three deputy federal chairersons. Ashor Sarupen was elected chairperson of the Federal Council with JP Smith, Thomas Walters and Carl Pophaim as his deputies. Dr Mark John Burke was elected federal finance chairperson.

The federal leadership elected at this congress will lead the party into the 2026 South African municipal elections.

== Background ==
The Democratic Alliance held its previous elective conference in April 2023 where incumbent federal leader John Steenhuisen and Federal Council Chairperson Helen Zille were re-elected to their posts, respectively. Steenhuisen led the party into the 2024 general election where the African National Congress lost its parliamentary majority and subsequently formed an unprecedented coalition with the latter. DA members of parliament were given posts in president Cyril Ramaphosa's cabinet with Steenhuisen being appointed as the Minister of Agriculture.

On 20 September 2025, Zille was announced as the party's mayoral candidate for the City of Johannesburg ahead of the 2026 South African municipal elections.

In November 2025, Steenhuisen requested that the DA federal finance chairperson Dion George be removed as the Minister of Forestry, Fisheries and the Environment which led to a public fallout between George and Steenhuisen and resulted in George accusing Steenhuisen of abusing his party-issued credit card.

The DA subsequently launched an investigation into the fallout between Steenhuisen and George. On 12 January 2026, the party's Federal Legal Commission cleared Steenhuisen on the allegations that he abused his party-issued credit card, but the party's Federal Executive did resolve to continue an investigations into whether the actions of Steenhuisen and George brought the party into disrepute. George resigned from the DA on 15 January 2026.

On 21 January 2026, Zille announced that she would not seek re-election as federal council chair at the party's congress. Steenhuisen announced during a press conference on 4 February 2026 that he would not seek re-election to another term, despite having declared that he would do so earlier. Steenhuisen was under pressure for his handling of the foot-and-mouth disease outbreak in South Africa and had reportedly fallen out with Zille, however, Zille and Steenhuisen have denied this.

== Leadership election ==
=== Candidates ===
- Sibusiso Dyonase, member of the Sedibeng council
- Geordin Hill-Lewis, mayor of Cape Town since 2021

==== Not nominated ====
- Siviwe Gwarube, minister of Basic Education since 2024 (running for deputy chair)
- Solly Malatsi, minister of Communications and Digital Technologies since 2024 (running for deputy chair)
- Ivan Meyer, incumbent federal chairperson since 2019 (running for re-election)
- Solly Msimanga, provincial party leader in Gauteng since 2020 (running for chair)
- Alan Winde, premier of the Western Cape since 2019

== Federal chairperson election ==
=== Candidates ===
- Ivan Meyer, incumbent federal chairperson since 2019
- Solly Msimanga, provincial party leader in Gauteng since 2020

== Deputy federal chairperson elections ==
Three candidates will be elected as deputy federal chairpersons.

=== Candidates ===
- Cilliers Brink, member of the Tshwane council (2011–19, 2023–) and former mayor of Tshwane (2023–24)
- Belinda Echeozonjoku
- Siviwe Gwarube, minister of Basic Education since 2024
- Solly Malatsi, minister of Communications and Digital Technologies since 2024
- Anroux Marais, member of the Western Cape parliament since 2004 and provinicial community safety minister since 2024
- Nomafrench Mbombo, member of the Western Cape parliament since 2014 and former provincial health minister (2015–24)
- Nicholas Nyati

== Federal council chairperson election ==
Incumbent Federal Council Chairperson Helen Zille had announced her intention to retire from the position. Only federal council delegates had the opportunity to vote in this election.

=== Candidates ===
- Ashor Sarupen, Deputy federal council chairperson since 2020 and the Deputy Minister of Finance since 2024
- Werner Horn, House Chairperson since 2024 and former DA provincial chairperson in the Free State
- Neo Mokoena

== Deputy federal council chairpersons election ==
Only federal council delegates had the opportunity to elect deputy federal council chairpersons.

=== Candidates ===
- Deonay Balie
- Sibusiso Dyonase
- Annelie Lotriet, deputy speaker of the National Assembly of South Africa since 2024 and incumbent deputy federal council chairperson
- Innocent James Mabaso
- Ricardo Mackenzie, Western Cape provincial minister of Cultural Affairs and Sport and member of the Western Cape Provincial Parliament
- John Popifa Makoela
- Nomafrench Mbombo, former Western Cape provincial minister of Health and member of the Western Cape Provincial Parliament
- Lungile Phenyane
- Carl Pophaim, Cape Town mayoral committee member for human settlements
- Segope Gabriel Sathekge
- Sello Seitlholo, deputy minister of water and sanitation since 2024
- JP Smith, Cape Town mayoral committee member for safety and security and incumbent deputy federal chairperson
- Thomas Walters, incumbent deputy federal council chairperson and member of the Western Cape Provincial Parliament

=== Disqualified ===
- Karabo Khakhau, DA national spokesperson and Member of Parliament

== Federal finance chairperson ==
Only Federal Council delegates were permitted to vote in this election. Federal finance chairperson Dion George had resigned from the party in January 2026 following a falling out between him and John Steenhuisen.

=== Candidates ===
- Erik Marais, Member of Parliament since 2009
- Mark Burke, Member of Parliament since 2024
- Fanyana Nkosi

== Results ==
Elections were held during the morning session on 12 April 2026. The results were announced during the afternoon session.

Geordin Hill-Lewis was elected the party's new federal leader, defeating Sibusiso Dyonase, the party's caucus leader in the Sedibeng District Municipality.

Solly Msimanga was elected federal chairperson, defeating incumbent Ivan Meyer. Siviwe Gwarube, Cilliers Brink and Solly Malatsi was elected as the three deputy federal chairpersons, respectively.

Ashor Sarupen was elected as the chairperson of the Federal Council with JP Smith, Thomas Walters and Carl Pophaim elected as the three deputy federal council chairpersons.

Mark Burke was elected federal finance chairperson.
