= Fred Nel =

South African politician (born 1970)

Fred Nel MPL

Chairperson of the Democratic Alliance in Gauteng
- Incumbent
- Assumed office 14 November 2020
- Deputy: Pogiso Mthimunye (2023–present); Bongani Nkomo (2020–2023)
- Leader: Solly Msimanga
- Preceded by: Michael Moriarty

Member of the Gauteng Provincial Legislature
- Incumbent
- Assumed office 6 May 2009

Personal details
- Born: Frederik Petrus Nel; 23 March 1970 (age 56) Pretoria, South Africa
- Party: Democratic Alliance
- Other political affiliations: Democratic Party
- Children: 3
- Education: Hoërskool Waterkloof; University of Pretoria
- Profession: Politician
- Committees: Roads & Transport Committee

Frederik Petrus Nel (born 23 March 1970) is a South African politician who has served as a Member of the Gauteng Provincial Legislature since May 2009, representing the Democratic Alliance. He is the DA's Gauteng Shadow MEC for Roads and Transport. Nel was elected as the DA provincial chairperson in 2020 and re-elected in 2023.

== Early life and education ==
Nel was born in Pretoria on 23 March 1970. He matriculated from Hoërskool Waterkloof in 1987. He earned a BA Honours degree in geography from the University of Pretoria. Nel worked in public relations, tourism marketing, market research and corporate social investment consulting before he became active in politics.

== Political career ==
Nel started his political career in 1988 on the UP campus and was elected the Democratic Party's National Youth Leader in 1992. He was elected as a DP councillor in the Greater Pretoria Metropolitan Council in 1998. In 2000, Nel was elected to the City of Tshwane Metropolitan Municipality council as a member of the Democratic Alliance. He was appointed caucus chief whip. Nel became caucus leader in 2003. In 2009, Nel was elected to the Gauteng Provincial Legislature. After his re-election in 2014, Nel was appointed Shadow MEC for Local Government and Human Settlements by DA caucus leader John Moodey. In 2016, he was appointed Shadow MEC for Roads and Transport.

He was re-elected to another term in 2019. Newly elected DA caucus leader Solly Msimanga announced that Nel would remain in his post. He is currently a member of the Roads & Transport Committee and the DA's constituency contact in Mamelodi West.

In 2020, Nel announced his candidacy to succeed Michael Moriarty as provincial chairperson of the DA. He went up against the DA's chairperson in Ekurhuleni, Selby Thekiso. He won the election on 14 November 2020 with 67% of the vote. Bongani Nkomo was elected his deputy.

Nel was elected to a second term as DA provincial chairperson at the party's provincial congress in 2023, after defeating Katlego Mathebe.

== Personal life ==
Nel has three children named Caroux Nel, Derik Nel and Stefan Nel.
