= Ashor Sarupen =

South African politician

The Honourable Ashor Sarupen MP
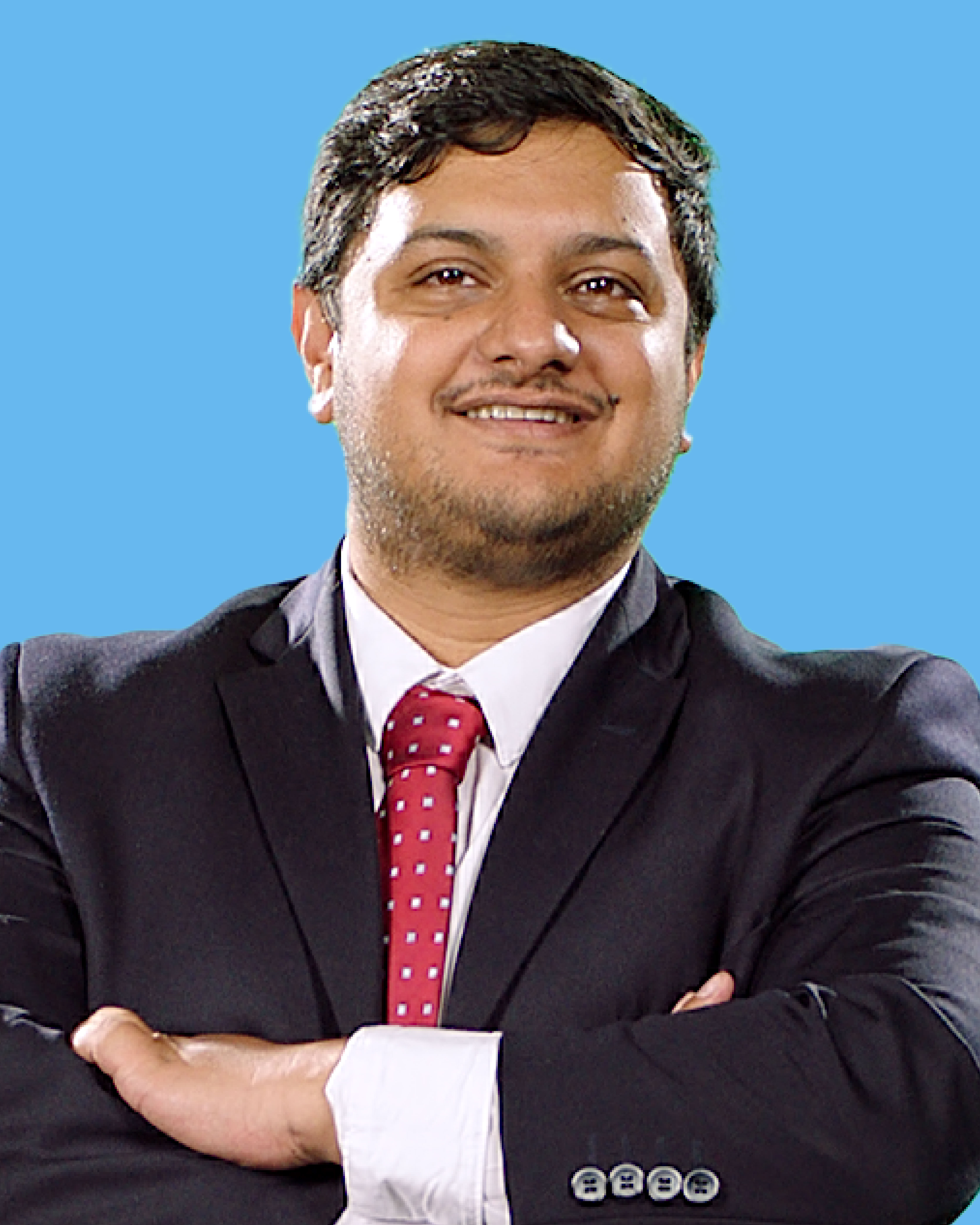

Deputy Minister of Finance
- Incumbent
- Assumed office 3 July 2024 Serving with David Masondo
- President: Cyril Ramaphosa
- Minister: Enoch Godongwana
- Preceded by: David Masondo

Chairperson of the Federal Council of the Democratic Alliance
- Incumbent
- Assumed office 12 April 2026
- Leader: Geordin Hill-Lewis
- Preceded by: Helen Zille

Deputy Chairperson of the Democratic Alliance Federal Council
- In office 27 November 2020 – 12 April 2026
- Leader: John Steenhuisen
- Chairperson: Helen Zille
- Preceded by: Thomas Walters; Natasha Mazzone; James Masango

Parliamentary Counsellor to the Chairperson of the Democratic Alliance Federal Council
- In office 1 February 2020 – 27 November 2020
- Chairperson: Helen Zille
- Preceded by: Position established

Chief of Staff to the Chairperson of the Democratic Alliance Federal Council
- In office 22 October 2019 – 31 January 2020
- Preceded by: Elsabe Oosthuysen
- Succeeded by: Nicholas Gotsell

Member of the National Assembly of South Africa
- Incumbent
- Assumed office 22 May 2019

Member of the Gauteng Provincial Legislature
- In office 21 May 2014 – 7 May 2019

Chief Whip of the Official Opposition in the Ekurhuleni City Council
- In office 18 March 2011 – 7 May 2014

Personal details
- Born: Ashor Sarupen; 1 July 1988 (age 38) Pietermaritzburg, Natal Province, South Africa
- Party: Democratic Alliance (2007–present)
- Education: University of the Witwatersrand;University of Pretoria
- Profession: Politician

Ashor Nick Sarupen (born 1 July 1988) is a South African politician who is serving as Deputy Minister of Finance since 3 July 2024. He has served as the Chairperson of the Federal Council of the Democratic Alliance since 12 April 2026. He is a Member of the National Assembly of South Africa for the Democratic Alliance (DA), after having taken office on 22 May 2019. He was a representative of the party on both the Standing Committee on Appropriations and the Standing Committee on Finance. He also served as chief of staff to DA Federal Council Chairperson Helen Zille, and presently serves as her Parliamentary Counsellor.

He previously served as a Member of the Gauteng Provincial Legislature from 2014 to 2019 and before that, he was the Democratic Alliance Chief Whip and City Councillor in the Ekurhuleni Metropolitan Municipality from 2011 to 2014.

== Biography ==
Sarupen was born in Pietermaritzburg in the former Natal Province. His family soon moved to Springs. He studied at the University of the Witwatersrand where he obtained a BSc Honours Degree and then a Masters in Business Administration. He later completed an MPhil in Corporate Strategy at the Gordon Institute of Business Science, University of Pretoria.

Sarupen joined the DA in 2007. He started his career as a research analyst with the party in 2009. He was elected to the Ekurhuleni Metropolitan Municipality Council centred around the East Rand in 2011 and was appointed the party's Chief Whip. He was elected to the Gauteng Provincial Legislature in May 2014 and became the party's Spokesperson on Finance. He was a strategist for the DA's 2014 national election campaign in Gauteng, and fulfilled a similar role in 2019, and ran the DA's 2016 campaign in Ekurhuleni for the local government elections. He became an MP after the May 2019 general elections. He was appointed the party's spokesperson on the Standing Committee on Appropriations. In October 2019, he ran Helen Zille's campaign for DA Federal Council Chairperson. She subsequently won the election.

During the DA's 2020 Federal Congress, delegates voted to add a third deputy chairperson to the Federal Council, the party's second-highest decision-making body. Sarupen was elected in a special election on 27 November 2020 with 73% of the vote. He served alongside James Masango and Thomas Walters. He was re-elected to a full term as the first deputy chairperson of the party's federal council at the party's 2023 Federal Congress, reportedly winning by a large margin.

== Chairperson of the DA Federal Council ==
After the incumbent Federal Council Chairperson Helen Zille announced that she would not stand for re-election at the DA's Federal Congress in April 2026, Sarupen announced his candidacy for the position. He was widely expected to win the position. He was elected on 12 April 2026, defeating House Chairperson, Werner Horn.
