= Willem Doman =

South African politician (born 1950)

Willem Doman MP
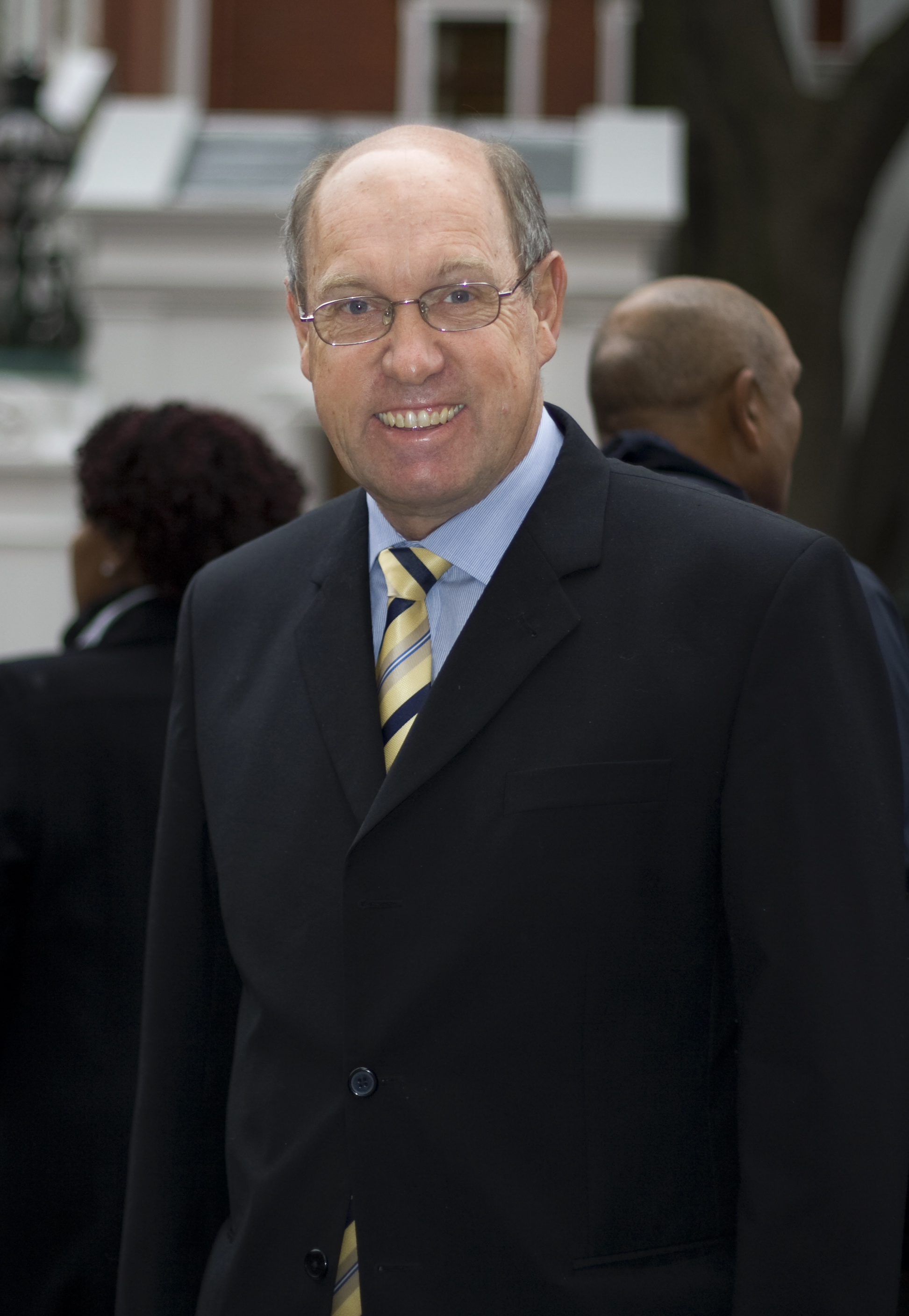

Shadow Minister of Cooperative Governance and Traditional Affairs
- In office 2004–2011
- Leader: Tony Leon and Helen Zille

Member of Parliament for Western Cape
- In office 6 May 2009 – 2011

Personal details
- Born: 1950 (age 75–76) Kimberley
- Party: Democratic Alliance

Willem Doman (born 1950) is a former South African politician, having served as the Shadow Minister of Cooperative Governance and Traditional Affairs, and a Member of Parliament for the opposition Democratic Alliance.

Doman was also one of the party's parliamentary whips.

He retired as a Member of Parliament in 2011.

== Background ==
Doman was originally elected to the House of Assembly in 1989 as a member of the National Party (NP) representing Goodwood in Cape Town. In 1994 he was elected to the Western Cape Provincial Legislature and was chosen as Speaker. He was re-elected Speaker in 1999, but in 2001 moved to become the provincial Minister of Local Government. In 2002 he left the Provincial Parliament and became a member of the National Assembly for the NP, now known as the New National Party.

In March 2003 Doman crossed the floor to the DA. He has served as spokesperson on Provincial and Local Government and remained on the portfolio after the Jacob Zuma administration changed its title to Cooperative Governance and Traditional Affairs. He stepped down from the National Assembly in 2011, and was replaced as MP by the young Geordin Hill-Lewis.

== Offices held ==
Political offices
Preceded by ?	South African Shadow Minister of Cooperative Governance and Traditional Affairs; 2004 – 2010	Succeeded by James Lorimer
Political offices
Preceded by James Masango	South African Shadow Minister of Public Works; 2010 – 2011	Succeeded by Anchen Dreyer
