= Mark John Burke =

South African politician

Mark John Burke MP
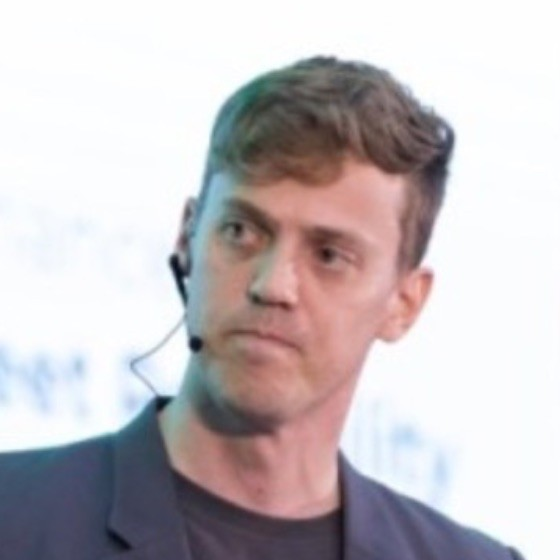

Federal Finance Chairperson of the Democratic Alliance
- Incumbent
- Assumed office 12 April 2026
- Leader: Geordin Hill-Lewis
- Preceded by: Dion George

Member of the National Assembly of South Africa
- Incumbent
- Assumed office 14 June 2024

Personal details
- Born: Mark John Burke; 1989 (age 36–37) Free State, South Africa
- Party: Democratic Alliance
- Spouse: Talia Simone da Silva Burke
- Occupation: Member of Parliament
- Profession: Politician

Mark John Burke is a South African politician who has been a Member of the National Assembly of South Africa since 2024, representing the Democratic Alliance (DA), of which he serves the Federal Finance Chairperson.

== Background ==
Burke was born in 1989 in Free State and is a native speaker of Afrikaans. He earned two bachelor's degrees in Computer Science and Language Technology from the Potchefstroom campus of North-West University. During his time at North-West University, he founded the Debate Society. He also earned a master's degree in Computer Science from the University of Cape Town, a master's degree in Technology Policy and a PhD both from the University of Cambridge on a scholarship from the Mandela Rhodes Foundation.

Burke is the founder of ExpandRand, a company providing money transfer services for expatriate South Africans, and a cofounder of Kastelo, a fintech company. He is married to Dr. Talia Simone da Silva Burke.

== Parliamentary career ==
Burke stood as a DA parliamentary candidate on the Western Cape list in the 2024 national elections and was subsequently elected to the National Assembly of South Africa. He was sworn in on 25 June 2024. He is a member of the Standing Committee on Finance and is an alternate member on the Standing Committees on Appropriations and on Public Accounts.

=== 2025 National Budget Contestation ===
In his capacity as the DA's spokesperson on finance, Burke was prominent in voicing the DA's opposition to the value-added tax (VAT) increases proposed by Finance Minister Enoch Godongwana in the first two versions of the 2025 national budget. He instead advocated for enhanced expenditure efficiency through a comprehensive review of government spending arguing that South Africa doesn't have a revenue problem but instead has a problem prioritising spending programs and growing the economy.

During deliberations of the Standing Committee on Finance in drafting a report on the 2025 Fiscal Framework and Revenue Proposals on 1 April 2025, Burke introduced a motion to amend the fiscal framework by removing the proposed 0,5 percent VAT increase. The motion was defeated in favour of an ActionSA proposal, supported by the African National Congress (ANC) and the Inkatha Freedom Party (IFP), to support the VAT increase. The report and the VAT increase were subsequently set aside by the Western Cape High Court on 27 April.

=== DA Federal Finance Chairperson: 2026–present ===
In March 2026, Burke was revealed as a candidate for the position of Federal Finance Chairperson of the Democratic Alliance, ahead of the DA's Federal Congress in April. He was elected on 12 April 2026, defeating MP Erik Marais and Fanyana Nkosi.

== Kastelo and Reserve Bank investigation ==
In 2026, Burke came under political scrutiny over his association with Kastelo, a South African financial-technology company involved in cryptocurrency arbitrage and other financial services. Kastelo became the subject of regulatory scrutiny by the South African Reserve Bank's Financial Surveillance Department (FinSurv) concerning transactions associated with its cryptocurrency-arbitrage activities. The controversy concerned Kastelo's financial activities and transactions involving approximately R4 billion, which were reported as being subject to scrutiny by the Reserve Bank. The investigation raised questions about the company's compliance with South Africa's exchange-control and financial-surveillance regulations.

Kastelo approached the High Court seeking urgent relief against the action. The court subsequently struck the application from the roll on procedural grounds, including a finding that the matter had not established the requisite urgency. The judgment did not constitute a final determination of the substantive allegations concerning Kastelo's compliance with exchange-control regulations.

The matter became a political controversy because of Burke's association with Kastelo and his position within the Democratic Alliance's parliamentary finance structures. In August 2026, media reports questioned whether Burke's association with the company presented a potential conflict of interest and called for greater disclosure concerning his relationship with Kastelo.

The controversy also generated calls from political parties for Burke to step down from his position as the Democratic Alliance's finance spokesperson pending clarification of the allegations concerning Kastelo..

The reporting concerning the Reserve Bank investigation did not establish that Burke personally committed wrongdoing or that he was himself the subject of a criminal finding. The regulatory action concerned Kastelo and its financial activities, while the political controversy surrounding Burke focused on his association with the company and whether that association was compatible with his political responsibilities. On 19 August 2026, Burne was removed as the Democratic Alliance's Parliament finance chairperson.
