= Thomas Walters (South African politician) =

South African politician (born 1976)

The Honourable Thomas Walters MPP
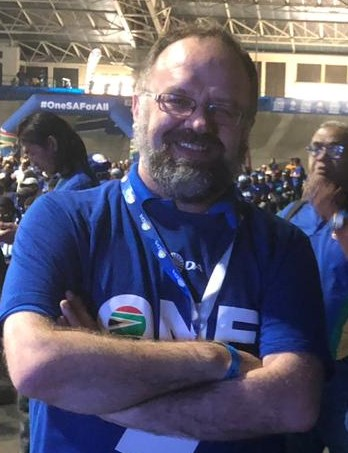

Member of the Western Cape Provincial Parliament
- Incumbent
- Assumed office 13 June 2024

Deputy Chairperson of the Federal Council of the Democratic Alliance
- Incumbent
- Assumed office 25 November 2012 Serving with JP Smith; Carl Pophaim
- Leader: John Steenhuisen; Mmusi Maimane; Helen Zille
- Chairperson: Ashor Sarupen; Helen Zille; James Selfe

Member of the National Assembly
- In office 21 May 2014 – 28 May 2024

Member of the Gauteng Provincial Legislature
- In office 6 May 2009 – 6 May 2014

Personal details
- Born: 30 January 1976 (age 50)
- Party: Democratic Alliance
- Occupation: Politician

Thomas Charles Ravenscroft Walters (born 30 January 1976) is a South African politician of the Democratic Alliance (DA) who has been serving as a Member of the Western Cape Provincial Parliament since May 2024. Previously, he served as a Member of the Gauteng Provincial Legislature from 2009 to 2014 and then as a Member of the National Assembly of South Africa from 2014 until 2024. In 2012, Walters was elected Deputy Federal Council Chairperson of the Democratic Alliance. Walters was the party's Shadow Minister and Shadow Deputy Minister of Rural Development and Land Reform.

== Early life and career ==
Thomas Walters obtained a Bachelor of Arts in political science from the University of Stellenbosch. He also completed the Management Advancement Programme at the Wits Business School. He later attained a Masters of Business Administration from the Gordon Institute of Business Science and the University of Pretoria's Business School.

== Political career ==
Walters was a student leader of the now-defunct Democratic Party. He had also served as the Democratic Alliance's Federal Youth Chairperson. He was later elected to the Johannesburg City Council as a DA councillor.

Walters was elected to the Gauteng Provincial Legislature in April 2009. He was appointed the party's Provincial Spokesperson on Agriculture and Rural Development. In November 2009, he was elected Provincial Chairperson of the Democratic Alliance in Gauteng. Walters stood down as Provincial Chairperson in March 2012, and Mike Moriarty was elected to succeed him.

In November 2012, Walters was elected Deputy Chairperson of the Democratic Alliance Federal Council, defeating John Steenhuisen.

During the 2014 general election that was held on 7 May, Walters was elected to the National Assembly of South Africa. He was sworn in as an MP on 21 May 2014. In June 2014, the Parliamentary Leader of the Democratic Alliance, Mmusi Maimane, appointed Walters as Shadow Minister of Rural Development and Land Reform. Walters was later demoted to Shadow Deputy Minister of Rural Development and Land Reform.

In 2015, he was re-elected as deputy chairperson of the DA's Federal Council. He won another term at the party's 2018 Federal Congress. Also, at the 2018 Federal Congress, DA delegates voted to add another deputy chairperson to the Federal Council and Natasha Mazzone was elected to fill the position. Walters left the Shadow Cabinet in June 2019.

In October 2019, Walters declared his intention to contest the DA Federal Council chairpersonship election after James Selfe had announced his retirement. Helen Zille won the election.

He was re-elected as a deputy chairperson of the DA Federal Council at the party's elective congress in October 2020. He now served alongside James Masango and Ashor Sarupen (later elected in a special election). Helen Zille remained the chairperson of the federal council.

Walters gained re-election to another term as deputy federal chairperson of the DA Federal Council in 2023.

Walters was elected to the Western Cape Provincial Parliament in the 2024 provincial election.

In 2026, Walters successfully stood for another term as a deputy chairperson of the DA Federal Council at the DA's Federal Congress.
