= Hilda Weber =

South African politician (born 1941)

Member of the National Assembly
- In office April 2004 – May 2009
- Constituency: Mpumalanga

Personal details
- Born: 4 September 1941 (age 84)
- Citizenship: South Africa
- Party: African National Congress

Hilda Weber (born 4 September 1941) is a retired South African politician who represented the Democratic Alliance (DA) in the National Assembly for a single term from 2004 to 2009. She was elected in the 2004 general election and, with James Masango, was one of the DA's two representatives in the Mpumalanga constituency. She is also a former provincial chairperson of the DA's provincial branch in Mpumalanga.
