= VIP Protection Unit =

VIP Protection Unit may refer to:

- VIP Protection Unit (Hong Kong)
- VIP Protection Unit (South Africa)
