= Michael Moriarty (politician) =

South African politician

Member of the Gauteng Provincial Legislature
- Incumbent
- Assumed office 6 May 2009 - 2021 and since 14 June 2024

Personal details
- Party: Democratic Alliance
- Occupation: Politician

Michael Sean Moriarty is a South African politician. He served as the chief whip of the Democratic Alliance (DA) in the Gauteng Provincial Legislature. He was elected to the legislature in 2009 and resigned from it in 2021. He was also the provincial chairperson of the DA in Gauteng. Moriarty was previously a City of Johannesburg municipal councillor.

Moriarty challenged incumbent DA Federal Council Chairperson Helen Zille at the party's Federal Congress in 2020. Zille won the election.

Shortly after Mpho Phalatse's election as mayor of Johannesburg, she appointed Moriarty as chief of staff in her office. He resigned from the provincial legislature to take up the position.

Michael Moriarty has again been a Member at Gauteng Provincial Legislature (Provincial-Legislature) since 14 June 2024.
