= Deetlefs du Toit =

Retired South African politician residing in New Jersey, United States

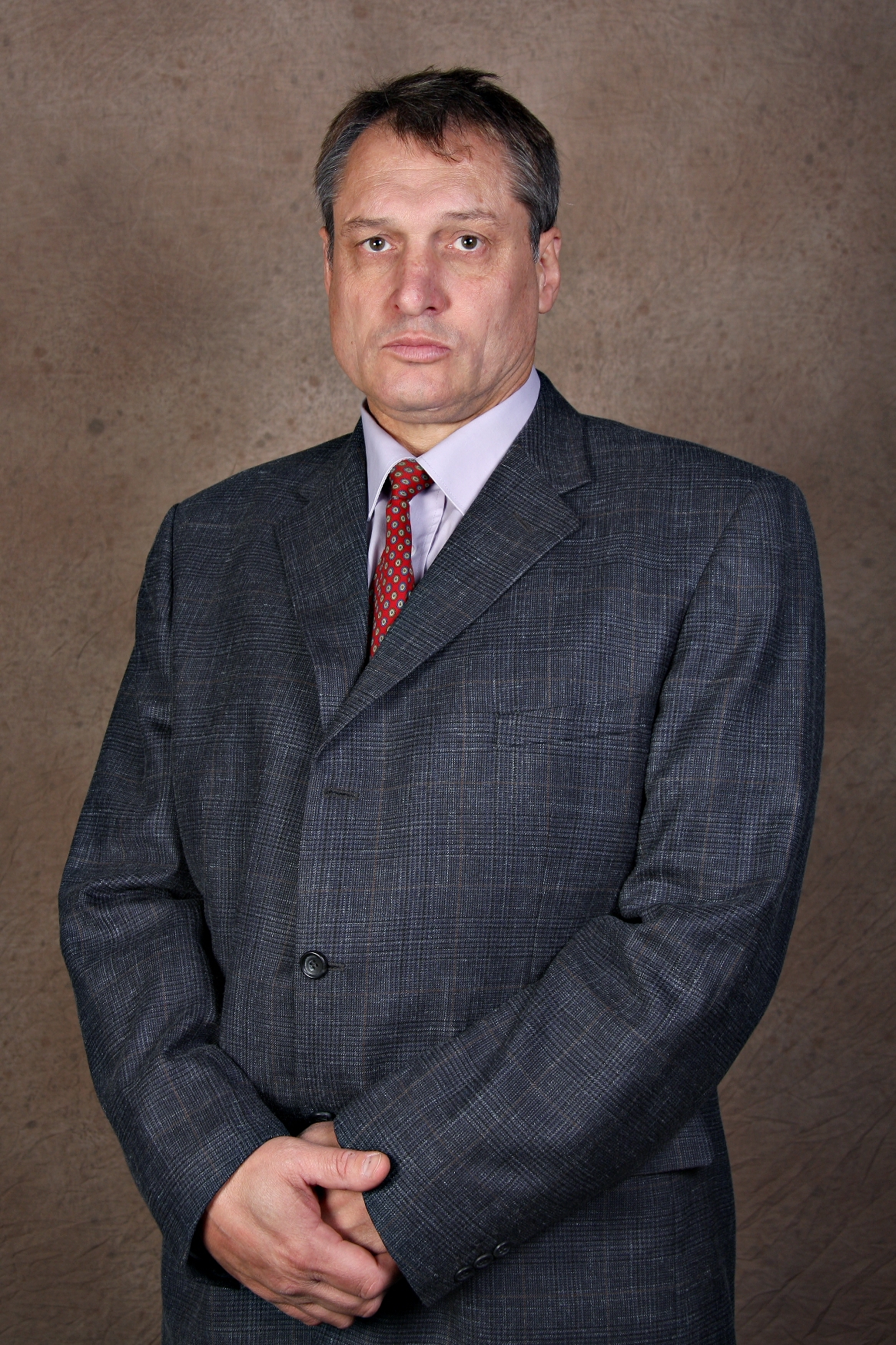
- Du Toit in 2009

Member of the National Assembly of South Africa
- In office 6 May 2009 – 6 May 2014

Personal details
- Born: Nicolaas Deetlefs du Toit Worcester, South Africa
- Citizenship: South Africa; United States
- Party: Independent
- Other political affiliations: Front National; Democratic Alliance; Democratic Party
- Education: Paarl Gimnasium
- Alma mater: University of Stellenbosch

Nicolaas Deetlefs du Toit is a retired South African politician now residing in New Jersey, United States.

Du Toit was born in Worcester in the former Cape Province, now the Western Cape. He attended and matriculated from Paarl Gimnasium in the neighbouring town of Paarl. He soon studied at Stellenbosch University and obtained a BA degree in Political Science, Sociology, Geography and Economics. He, later on, achieved an Honours degree in Business Administration from the university.

Du Toit worked in agriculture, poultry processing and clothing manufacturing before he became involved in local politics. He joined the Democratic Party of South Africa (DP) in 2000 and was elected to the newly established Drakenstein Local Municipality council in the same year. He was promoted to the post of Democratic Alliance (DA) caucus leader in 2007.

He became an MP for the DA in 2009 and served as one until 2014. He served on the Portfolio Committee on Public Service and Administration.

Du Toit later defected to the Front National in October 2015, citing a policy change in the DA. He soon moved to New Jersey.
