= Fawzia Rhoda =

South African politician

Fawzia Rhoda MPL

Member of the Northern Cape Provincial Legislature
- Incumbent
- Assumed office 22 May 2019

Personal details
- Born: Fawzia Rhoda
- Party: Democratic Alliance
- Profession: Politician

Fawzia Rhoda is a South African politician serving as a Member of the Northern Cape Provincial Legislature since May 2019. Rhoda is a member of the Democratic Alliance.

== Political career ==
In the build-up to the provincial election on 8 May 2019, Rhoda was placed fourth on the Democratic Alliance's Northern Cape provincial list. She was elected as the DA won 8 seats. She was sworn in as a Member of the Northern Cape Provincial Legislature on 22 May 2019 following the election. She is the head of the DA's Bo Karoo constituency.

In 2020, Rhoda declared her candidacy for Northern Cape DA leader. The provincial congress was held on 5 December 2020. She lost to Harold McGluwa.
