= Geordin Hill-Lewis =

South African politician (b. 1986)

The Honourable Alderman Geordin Hill-Lewis
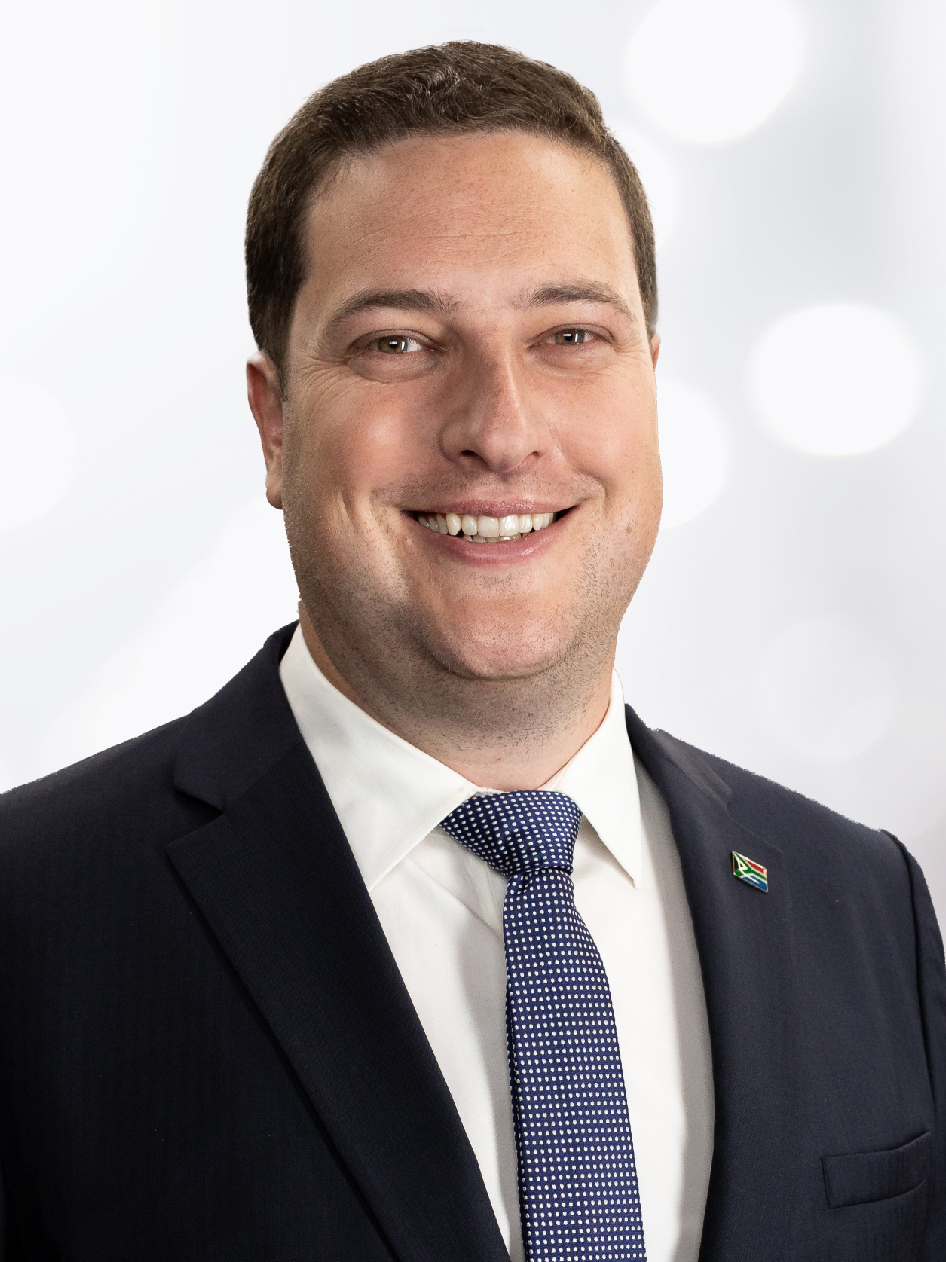
- Hill-Lewis in 2021

Federal Leader of the Democratic Alliance
- Incumbent
- Assumed office 12 April 2026
- Preceded by: John Steenhuisen

Mayor of Cape Town
- Incumbent
- Assumed office 18 November 2021
- Deputy: Eddie Andrews
- Preceded by: Dan Plato

Deputy Leader of the Democratic Alliance in the Western Cape
- In office 11 November 2023 – 12 April 2026
- Preceded by: JP Smith (interim)
- Succeeded by: Vacant

Member of the Cape Town City Council
- Incumbent
- Assumed office 9 November 2021
Shadow ministerial positions 2011–2021
Shadow Minister of Finance
In office 5 June 2019 – 9 November 2021
Leader	Mmusi Maimane; John Steenhuisen
Preceded by	David Maynier
Succeeded by	Dion George
Shadow Minister of Trade and Industry
In office 5 June 2014 – 1 June 2017
Leader	Mmusi Maimane
Preceded by	Wilmot James
Succeeded by	Dean Macpherson
Shadow Deputy Minister of Trade and Industry
In office 1 February 2012 – 5 June 2014
Leader	Lindiwe Mazibuko
Preceded by	Jacques Smalle
Succeeded by	Dean Macpherson
Shadow Deputy Minister of Public Service and Administration
In office August 2011 – 1 February 2012
Leader	Lindiwe Mazibuko; Athol Trollip
Preceded by	Ena van Schalkwyk
Succeeded by	Deetlefs du Toit

Member of the National Assembly of South Africa
- In office 19 August 2011 – 9 November 2021
- Preceded by: Willem Doman
- Succeeded by: Christopher Mario Fry
- Constituency: Western Cape (2011–2019); National (2019–2021)

Personal details
- Born: Geordin Gwyn Hill-Lewis; 31 December 1986 (age 39) Plettenberg Bay, Cape Province, South Africa
- Party: Democratic Alliance (since 2004)
- Spouse: Carla Hill-Lewis (m. 2010)
- Children: 1
- Education: Edgemead High School
- Alma mater: University of Cape Town; University of London
- Occupation: Politician; legislator

Geordin Gwyn Hill-Lewis (born 31 December 1986) is a South African politician who has been the Federal Leader of the Democratic Alliance since April 2026 and Mayor of Cape Town since November 2021.

Born in Plettenberg Bay, Hill-Lewis attended Edgemead High School in Cape Town, and obtained an Honours degree in Politics, Philosophy and Economics from the University of Cape Town, and a Master's degree in Finance specialising in Economic Policy from the University of London.

Hill-Lewis served in the National Assembly of South Africa for more than a decade from August 2011 to November 2021. He held multiple positions in the DA's Shadow Cabinet, including serving as the Shadow Deputy Minister of Public Service from August 2011 to February 2012, as the Shadow Deputy Minister of Trade and Industry from February 2012 to June 2014, as the Shadow Minister of Trade and Industry between June 2014 and June 2017, and as the Shadow Minister of Finance from June 2019 until he resigned to become mayor in November 2021.

In November 2023, Hill-Lewis was elected unopposed as the DA deputy provincial leader in the Western Cape. In February 2026, he announced his campaign to succeed John Steenhuisen as the federal leader of the Democratic Alliance. He was elected on 12 April 2026 at the party's Federal Congress.

== Early life and education ==
Hill-Lewis was born on 31 December 1986 in Plettenberg Bay. His family moved to Cape Town during his early childhood. Following his parents' divorce, he was raised by his mother, a nurse. His late father was an artist. He attended Edgemead High School and holds a Bachelor of Commerce degree and an honours degree in politics, philosophy and economics from the University of Cape Town. From the University of London, he obtained a master's degree in economic policy.

== Early political career ==
Hill-Lewis became politically active during his high school years. During his studies at the University of Cape Town, he founded the Democratic Alliance Students' Organisation (DASO). He worked as Chief of Staff to Western Cape Premier Helen Zille.

== Parliamentary career (2011–2021) ==
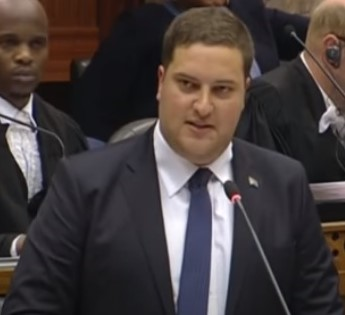
Hill-Lewis during the Debate on the February 2019 State of the Nation Address

In August 2011, Hill-Lewis was appointed to the National Assembly, the lower house of parliament, to fill Willem Doman's seat. He was only twenty-four years and seven months old when he took office, making him the youngest MP since 1994. He was appointed Shadow Deputy Minister of Public Service and Administration by the DA parliamentary leader, Athol Trollip.

In February 2012, the newly elected DA parliamentary leader Lindiwe Mazibuko appointed Hill-Lewis to the shadow cabinet as the Shadow Deputy Minister of Trade and Industry. After the 2014 general election, he was succeeded as the youngest MP by Yusuf Cassim, also a member the DA. The newly elected DA parliamentary leader, Mmusi Maimane appointed him Shadow Minister of Trade and Industry in June 2014. Hill-Lewis was removed from the shadow cabinet in June 2017 following his appointment as chief of staff in Maimane's office.

Following the 2019 general election, Hill-Lewis was elevated to Shadow Minister of Finance in Maimane's new shadow cabinet. He remained in the position following John Steenhuisen's election as DA leader in November 2020. Hill-Lewis resigned from the National Assembly on 9 November 2021 ahead of his move to the Cape Town City Council.

== Mayor of Cape Town (2021–present) ==
=== 2021 mayoral campaign ===
On 1 April 2021, Hill-Lewis announced that he had applied to be the DA's mayoral candidate for the City of Cape Town for the local government elections to be held later in the year. He had been the DA's constituency head in George at that time.

He contested the party's nomination against incumbent mayor Dan Plato and the party's provincial leader Bonginkosi Madikizela, during the party's internal candidate selection process. Madikizela later resigned as provincial leader and from all active party roles after being embroiled in a qualifications scandal. Hill-Lewis was considered to be the frontrunner by the media and political analysts.

DA leader John Steenhuisen announced on 23 August that Hill-Lewis would be the DA's mayoral candidate in the 2021 local government elections. Incumbent mayor Plato pledged to support Hill-Lewis's campaign. On 29 August 2021, Hill-Lewis launched his campaign to become mayor in Bonteheuwel, the site of his first DA meeting, which he attended in June 2004 at the home of ward councillor Theresa Thompson.

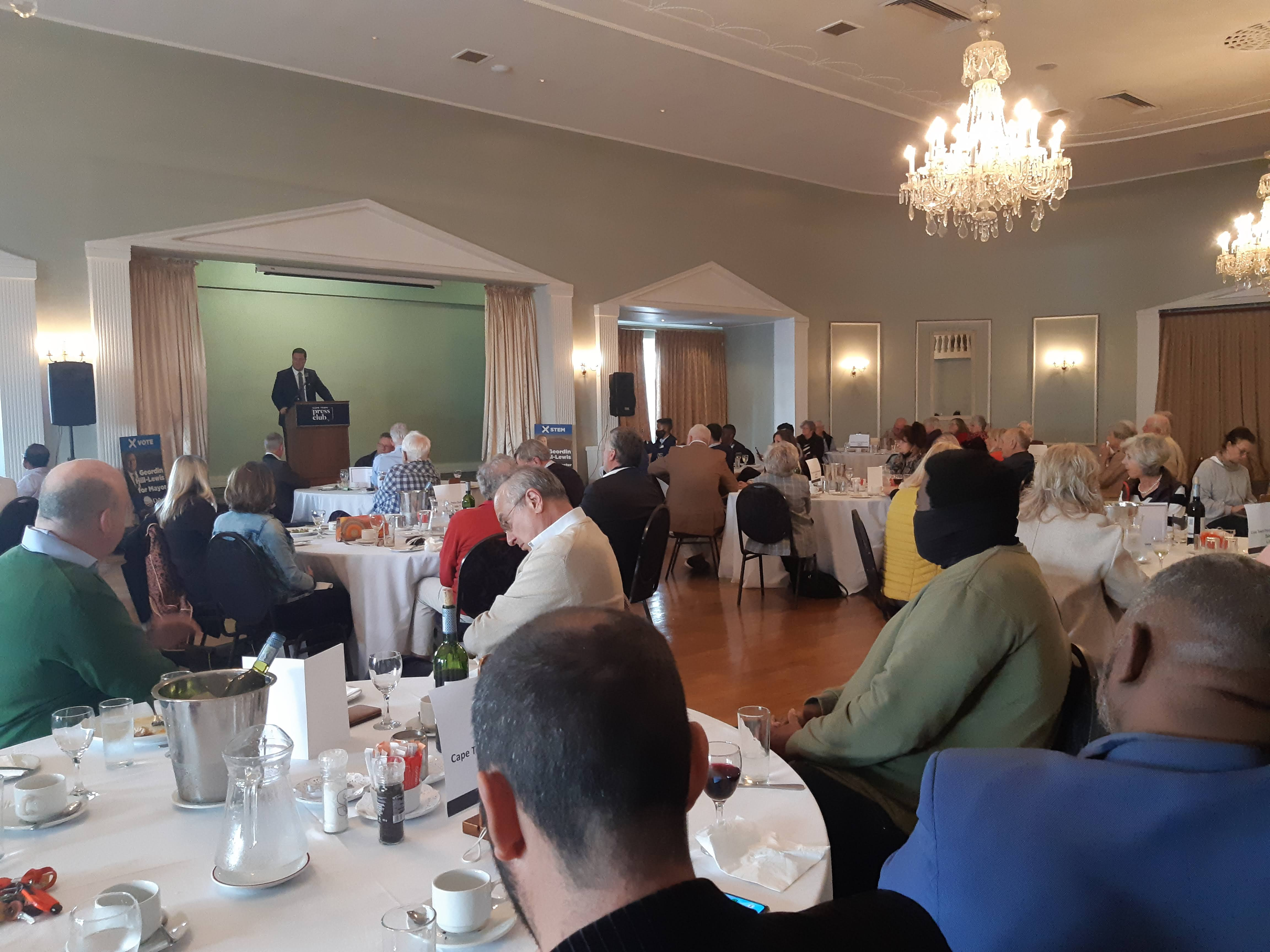
Hill-Lewis addressing the Cape Town Press Club in September 2021

In September 2021, Hill-Lewis wrote to the Minister of Public Works and Infrastructure and former DA mayor Patricia de Lille, calling on her to cancel the government's lease for the Acacia Park Parliamentary Village so that the City of Cape Town can buy the land from the government and release it for the development of affordable housing. De Lille responded by calling him "stupid", despite her past support for the proposal. Hill-Lewis then led a demonstration outside the Department of Public Works building and handed over a memorandum. Hill-Lewis had also identified the Air Force Base Ysterplaat and the SAS Wingfield for social housing.

On 7 October 2021, Hill-Lewis announced his seven-point plan to end loadshedding in the City of Cape Town. His plan included procuring electricity directly from Independent Power Producers and investing in the Steenbras hydroelectric plant.

On 3 November, two days after the municipal elections on 1 November, the DA was projected to retain its majority in the City of Cape Town, winning 58% of the vote, an 8% decline from the 66% the party achieved in the 2016 municipal elections. Hill-Lewis admitted in an interview with News24 journalist Jan Gerber that the DA performed much better than he expected.

=== Tenure ===
On 18 November 2021, the city council held its inaugural meeting after the election, at which Hill-Lewis was elected and sworn in as mayor. Hill-Lewis was elected mayor with 141 out of 224 votes. The ANC's Noluthando Makasi received 46 votes while the Cape Independence Party's Jack Miller got only two votes. There were 20 abstentions and 15 spoilt ballots. At age 34, he became the second youngest mayor in the city's history, after David Graaff (1891–1892). On his first day in office, he inspected sewage issues in Khayelitsha and Phoenix.

On 22 November, Hill-Lewis announced the formation of his 11-member mayoral committee to turn Cape Town into a "city of hope". Only six councillors out of the previous administration were retained. Long-serving members Ian Neilson, Xanthea Limberg, Marian Nieuwoudt, Phindile Maxiti and Sharon Cottle were not reappointed to the new mayoral committee.

Hill-Lewis was elected unopposed as the DA's deputy provincial leader at the party's provincial congress on 11 November 2023.

In May 2025, Hill-Lewis was shown to be broadly popular amongst his fellow Council members, when he won a motion of no confidence by a significant margin (138 against and 46 in favour). The motion was tabled by the single-issue opposition party, the National Coloured Congress, and was seen as a spiteful endeavour to detract from an ongoing court case the City has against the NCC's leader, Fadiel Adams, for racist remarks he made. Hill-Lewis said at the time of the motion that the NCC's actions were frivolous, and that they should behave better at council meetings for the benefit of Cape Town residents.

=== 2026 mayoral campaign ===
On 13 June 2026, Hill-Lewis was announced as the party's mayoral candidate for the City of Cape Town in the 2026 local government elections during a party event at the Hanover Park Civic Centre. He announced five pledges should he be elected to a second term as mayor: stronger policing, more jobs, reliable and affordable service delivery, expanded housing opportunities, and cleaner public spaces.

== Federal Leader of the Democratic Alliance: 2026–present ==
=== Election ===
In February 2026, Hill-Lewis announced that he would run for federal leader of the Democratic Alliance at party's Federal Congress in April. Incumbent leader John Steenhuisen had announced in February that he would not seek a third term as party leader, a decision widely speculated as being done in order to allow Hill-Lewis to run for leadership.

During the campaign, Hill-Lewis promised that, as party leader, he intended to keep the party as a partner in the current Government of National Unity, a grand coalition government. Hill-Lewis also confirmed that he would remain in his role as Mayor of Cape Town instead of taking up a position in the National Assembly. He said that doing so would allow him to maintain some distance from the Cabinet, thereby allowing him to criticise the President's decisions as DA leader, if he wished to do so, without the limitations of being part of the Cabinet himself. He also said he found his work as Cape Town Mayor impactful and meaningful.

During his candidate speech to the Federal Congress at the Gallagher Convention Centre in Midrand on 11 April 2026, Hill-Lewis said that his vision for the DA is that it becomes a party in touch with the lived experiences of all South Africans. He was elected leader on 12 April 2026, defeating the DA's caucus leader in the Sedibeng District Municipality, Sibusiso Dyonase.

=== Tenure ===
On 18 April 2026, Hill-Lewis appointed party strategist Ryan Coetzee and Home Affairs Minister Leon Schreiber to oversee the party's ministers and deputy ministers in government.

Hill-Lewis declined to return to parliament and the DA parliamentary caucus elected the former chief whip George Michalakis under Steenhuisen as the parliamentary leader on 7 May 2026, a move which Hill-Lewis welcomed.

On 17 June 2026, Hill-Lewis wrote to President Cyril Ramaphosa requesting that he make changes to the DA appointments in his national executive, notably demoting former party leader Steenhuisen from Minister of Agriculture to Deputy Minister of Trade Industry and Competition. The Minister of Forestry, Fisheries and the Environment, Willie Aucamp, was selected to replace Steenhuisen, while the Western Cape MEC for Education, David Maynier, was chosen to succeed Aucamp in his portfolio. Hill-Lewis also made changes to the DA's deputy ministers; he selected the longest-serving member of the Gauteng provincial legislature Jack Bloom to succeed Sello Seitlholo as the Deputy Minister of Water and Sanitation, while Yusuf Cassim was chosen to replace Mimmy Gondwe as the Deputy Minister of Higher Education and Training. The outgoing Deputy Minister of Trade, Industry and Competition Alexandra Abrahams was nominated to take over from Samantha Graham-Maré as the Deputy Minister of Energy and Electricity. Graham-Maré, Seitlholo and Gondwe were not appointed to other positions and left the executive when Ramaphosa formalised Hill-Lewis's request on 30 June 2026.

== Personal life ==
Hill-Lewis is married to Carla Hill-Lewis (née van der Merwe), a former fashion designer. They have one child, who was born in August 2015. They reside in Edgemead, one of the northern suburbs of Cape Town. He is an avid rugby union fan.

Party political offices
Preceded by John Steenhuisen	Federal Leader of the Democratic Alliance; 2026–present	Incumbent
Political offices
Preceded by Ena van Schalkwyk	Shadow Deputy Minister of Public Service and Administration; 2011–2012	Succeeded by Deetlefs du Toit
Preceded by Jacques Smalle	Shadow Deputy Minister of Trade and Industry; 2012–2014	Succeeded by Dean Macpherson
Preceded by Wilmot James	Shadow Minister of Trade and Industry; 2014–2017	Succeeded by Dean Macpherson
Preceded by David Maynier	Shadow Minister of Finance; 2019–2021	Succeeded by Vacant
Preceded by Dan Plato	Mayor of Cape Town; 2021 – present	Succeeded by Incumbent
