= 2023 Democratic Alliance Federal Congress =

- 1–2 April 2023
- Turnout: 98.2% (▲9,6 pp)
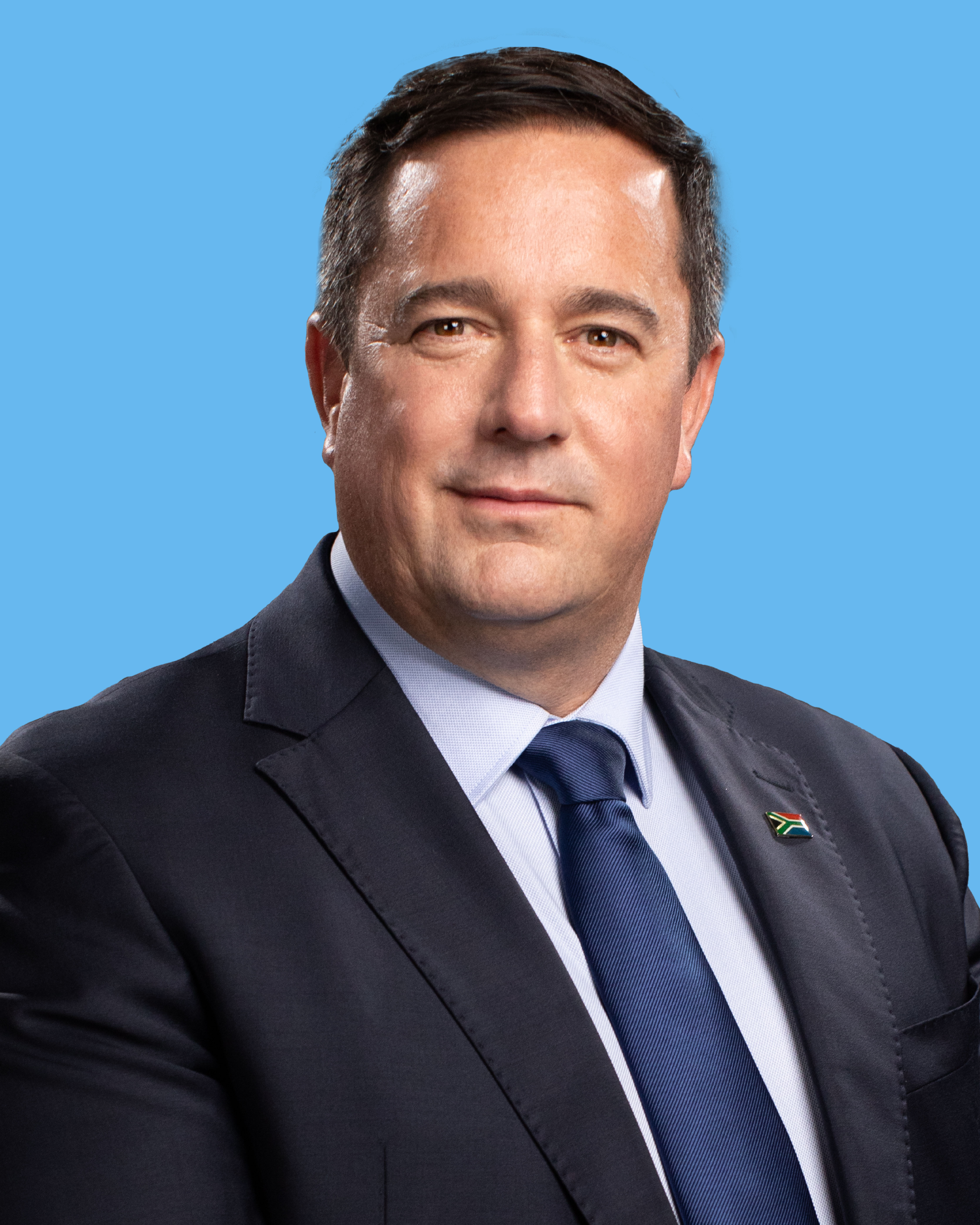

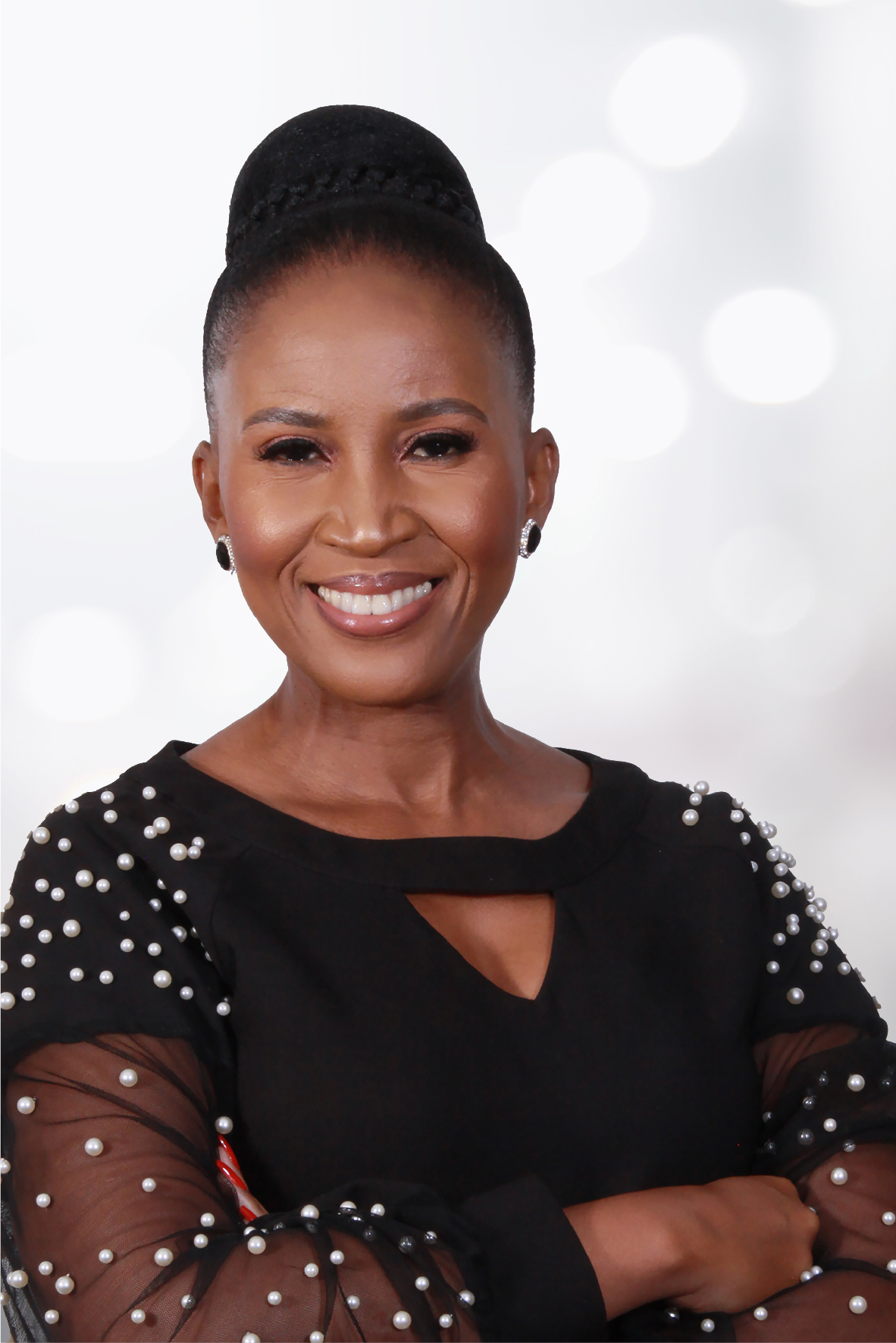
Candidate	John Steenhuisen	Mpho Phalatse
Popular vote	1,660	340
Percentage	83%	17%

The Democratic Alliance (DA) held its leadership conference between the 1st and 2 April 2023 at Gallagher Estate in Gauteng, South Africa. This congress what was described as the largest party conference since its formation in 2000.

== Candidates ==
Mpho Phalatse announced her candidacy for federal leader election, running against then incumbent leader John Steenhuisen, in March 2023. She had previously served as mayor of Johannesburg in 2021 and 2022.

== Results ==
Over 2000 delegates voted, making up 98,2% of the registered amount of DA delegates. The election at Gallagher Estate resulted in John Steenhuisen being re-elected DA federal leader by an overwhelming majority of 83%. His opponent, former mayor of Johannesburg Mpho Phalatse, won the remaining 17%.
