= JP Smith (politician) =

South African politician (born 1971)

Councillor Jean-Pierre Smith
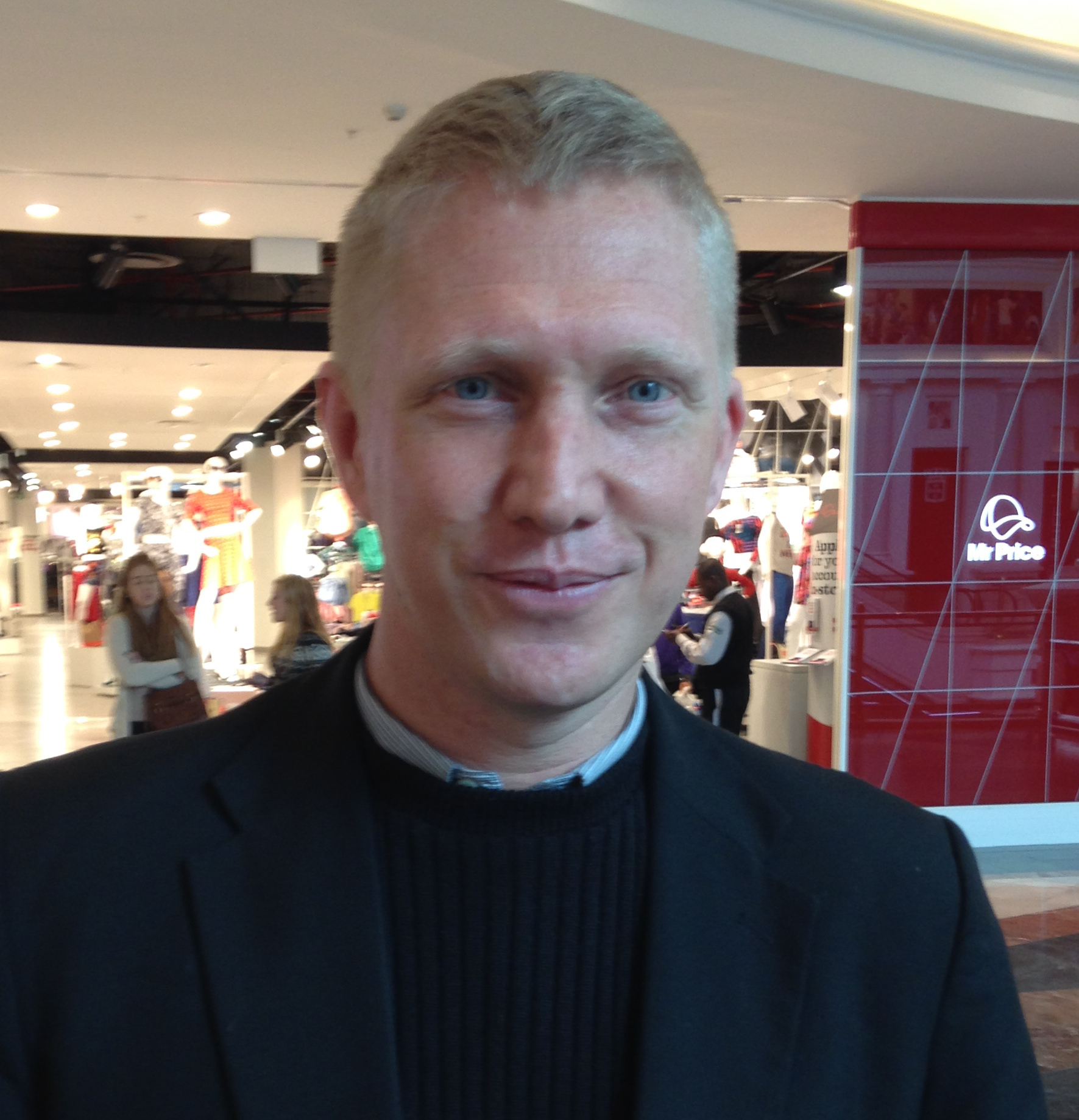

Deputy Chairperson of the Democratic Alliance Federal Council
- Incumbent
- Assumed office 12 April 2026
- Leader: Geordin Hill-Lewis

Deputy Federal Chairperson of the Democratic Alliance
- In office 2 April 2023 – 12 April 2026 Serving with Anton Bredell, Solly Malatsi
- Leader: John Steenhuisen

Deputy Leader of the Democratic Alliance in the Western Cape
- In office 7 May 2022 – 11 November 2023
- Leader: Tertuis Simmers (interim)
- Preceded by: Tertuis Simmers (interim)
- Succeeded by: Geordin Hill-Lewis

Personal details
- Born: 13 July 1971 (age 54)
- Party: Democratic Alliance
- Profession: Politician

Jean-Pierre "JP" Smith is a South African politician and Cape Town city councillor for Subcouncil 15, Ward 54. An area that includes Sea Point, Green Point, and Mouille Point. He is a member of Democratic Alliance and prior to the 2014 general elections he was tipped of as the party's candidate to lead the City's Housing portfolio. Since 2009 he is the mayoral committee member responsible for safety and security in the Democratic Alliance-led Cape Town city council.

In May 2022, he was elected deputy interim provincial leader of the DA in the Western Cape. Smith was elected as one of three deputy federal chairpersons of the party's congress in April 2023. He was elected chairperson of the DA's Metro Region in the Western Cape in October 2023 and stood down as deputy provincial leader in November 2023. In 2026, Smith successfully ran for deputy chairperson of the Democratic Alliance Federal Council.

== Political career ==
Smith first started his career in politics in 2000 as ward councillor for Ward 54 where one of his first issues was campaigning to demolish the wall around Graaff's Pool in Sea Point.

In 2009 he became the head of the Security Portfolio for the City of Cape Town and led an aggressive campaign against crime and anti-social behaviour in Sea Point using a Broken Windows strategy. Crime had been increasing in the area throughout the 1990s but after the adoption of this approach the area saw a decline in criminal activity throughout the 2000s.

In 2012 Smith was gagged along with other members of the mayoral committee by mayor Patricia De Lille for making comments rejecting plans to allow the Cape Town Stadium to be converted in an attempt to make it financially viable. The Cape Town Stadium is situated in his constituency where it has drawn criticism from local residences.

=== Safety and security portfolio ===
Since 2009 Smith is the mayoral committee member responsible for safety and security for the City of Cape Town. He spearheaded the adoption and implementation of two important by-laws. The Cape Liquor Law (2013-2014) regulating trading hours and a controversial dog by-law from 2010 to 2012. He also oversaw the expansion of the city's Metropolitan Police Force whilst fighting attempts by national government to assimilate it into the South African Police Service. Smith also introduced a number of specialised units within the Metropolitan Police to deal with land invasions, road offences, drugs and problem buildings.

=== DA leadership positions ===
On 7 May 2022, Smith was elected as the new interim deputy provincial leader of the DA in the Western Cape. He defeated DA Member of the Provincial Parliament Wendy Philander, Breede Valley mayor Antoinette Steyn and Breede Valley councillor Megann Goedeman.

On 2 April 2023, Smith was announced as one of three deputy federal chairperson of the DA after the party's Federal Congress. In October 2023, Smith was elected chairperson of the DA's Metro Region which is based on the City of Cape Town Metropolitan Municipality. Geordin Hill-Lewis succeeded him as the deputy provincial leader of the DA in November 2023.

In the run-up to the DA's Federal Congress, Smith announced that he would be contesting the position of deputy chairperson of the DA Federal Council, instead of seeking re-election to his role as deputy federal chairperson. Smith made a shock endorsement when he endorsed Solly Msimanga against incumbent Ivan Meyer in the race for federal chairperson, which caused a considerable shift in the election's dynamics. Smith was elected one of three deputy chairpersons of the DA Federal Council on 12 April 2026.
