= James Masango =

South African politician (born 1957)

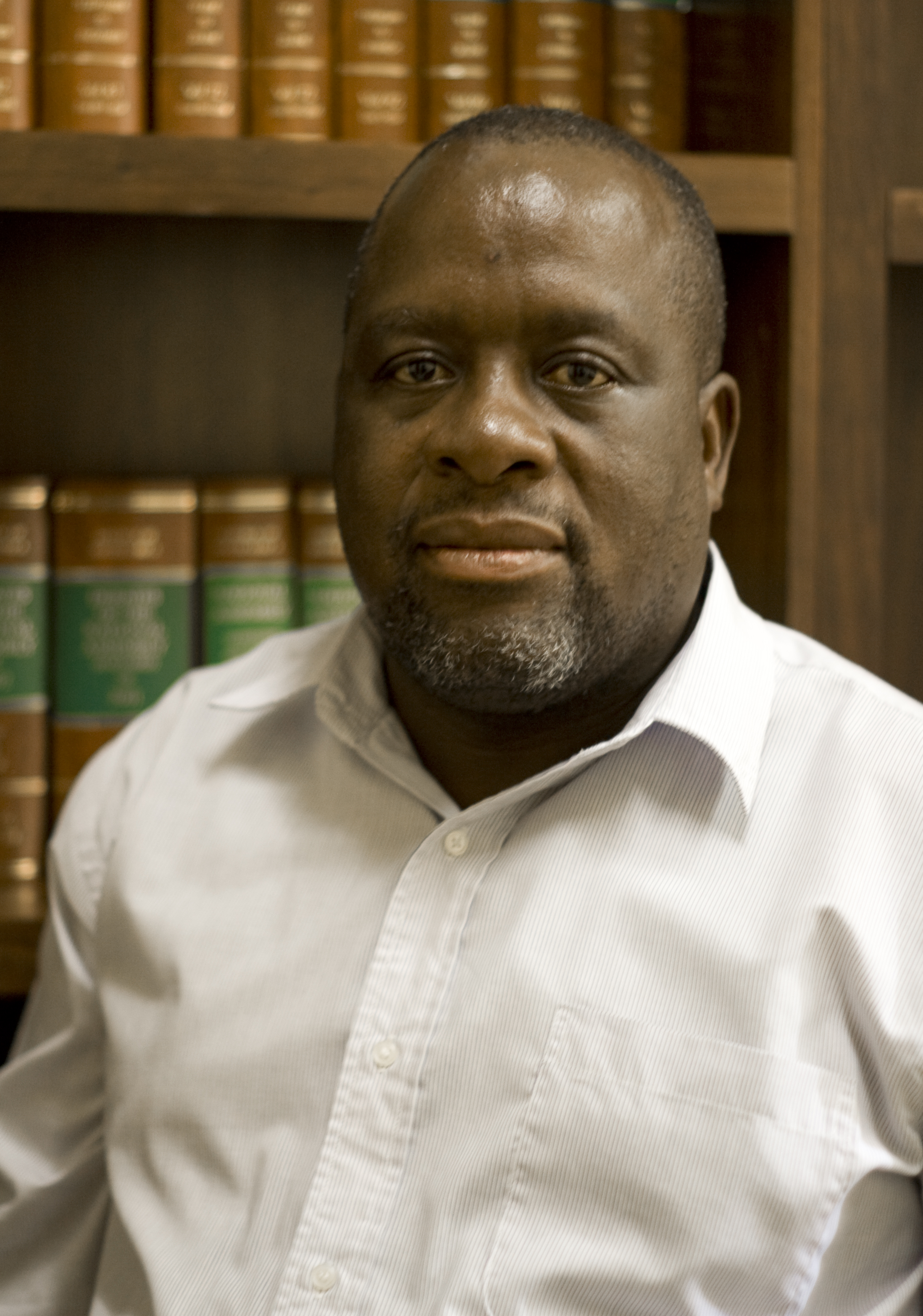
- Masango in 2009

Deputy Shadow Minister of Public Works
- In office 2014–2015
- Leader: Helen Zille
- Preceded by: Japie van der Linde

Shadow Minister of Public Works
- In office 2004–2012
- Succeeded by: Anchen Dreyer

Member of the National Assembly
- In office 21 May 2014 – 26 August 2015
- In office 23 April 2004 – 8 November 2011
- Constituency: Mpumalanga

Personal details
- Born: Suhla James Masango; 2 September 1957 (age 68)
- Party: Democratic Alliance

Suhla James Masango (born 2 September 1957) is a South African politician who represented the Democratic Alliance (DA) in the National Assembly and Mpumalanga Provincial Legislature between 2004 and 2019. Since 2021, he has been a local councillor for the DA in Mpumalanga's Govan Mbeki Municipality. Masango was a deputy chairperson of the DA Federal Council from November 2020 to April 2023 and is a former provincial leader of the party's Mpumalanga branch.

== Early political career ==
Born on 2 September 1957, Masango joined the DA's forerunner, the Democratic Party, in 1994. He was a ward councillor in the Govan Mbeki Local Municipality from 2000 until 2004. During the same period, he was active in the DA's Mpumalanga branch: he was elected deputy provincial chairperson in 2000 and then rose to become provincial chairperson in 2004, a position he held for 11 years.

== Legislative career: 2004–2019 ==
In the 2004 general election, Masango was elected to the National Assembly; he and Hilda Weber were the DA's two representatives in the Mpumalanga constituency. Masango served on the Portfolio Committees on Sport and Recreation and Housing, and he was the Shadow Deputy Minister of Defense and Military Veterans. After his re-election to a second term in Parliament in 2009, he was appointed as the Shadow Minister of Public Works.

However, on 8 November 2011, Masango resigned from his seat in the National Assembly in order to join the Mpumalanga Provincial Legislature. He returned to the National Assembly in the 2014 general election and served as the Deputy Shadow Minister of Public Works between 2014 and 2015.

Following the resignation of the previous DA provincial leader Anthony Benadie in 2015, Masango stood for the post and was elected uncontested as Provincial Leader of the DA in Mpumalanga. Thereafter he returned to the Mpumalanga Provincial Legislature, where he replaced Benadie as DA caucus leader and leader of the official opposition in the Legislature,

He held the position as provincial leader for three years, before standing aside in favour of Jane Sithole in 2018, and he continued to lead the DA's caucus in the provincial legislature until the 2019 general election.

== Later political career ==
After the 2019 election, Masango initially retired from politics, but he soon returned to active party work in late 2020 and stood uncontested for one of the two deputy chairpersons of the Federal Council at the party's elective congress in October. He assumed the post on 1 November 2020.

In 2021, he was sworn in as a proportional-representation councillor, once again representing the DA in Govan Mbeki Local Municipality.

Masango was not re-elected to another term as deputy chairperson of the DA Federal Council at the party's Federal Congress held in April 2023.
