= Democratic Alliance Federal Council =

Governing and policy-making body of the Democratic Alliance

Official logo of the Democratic Alliance

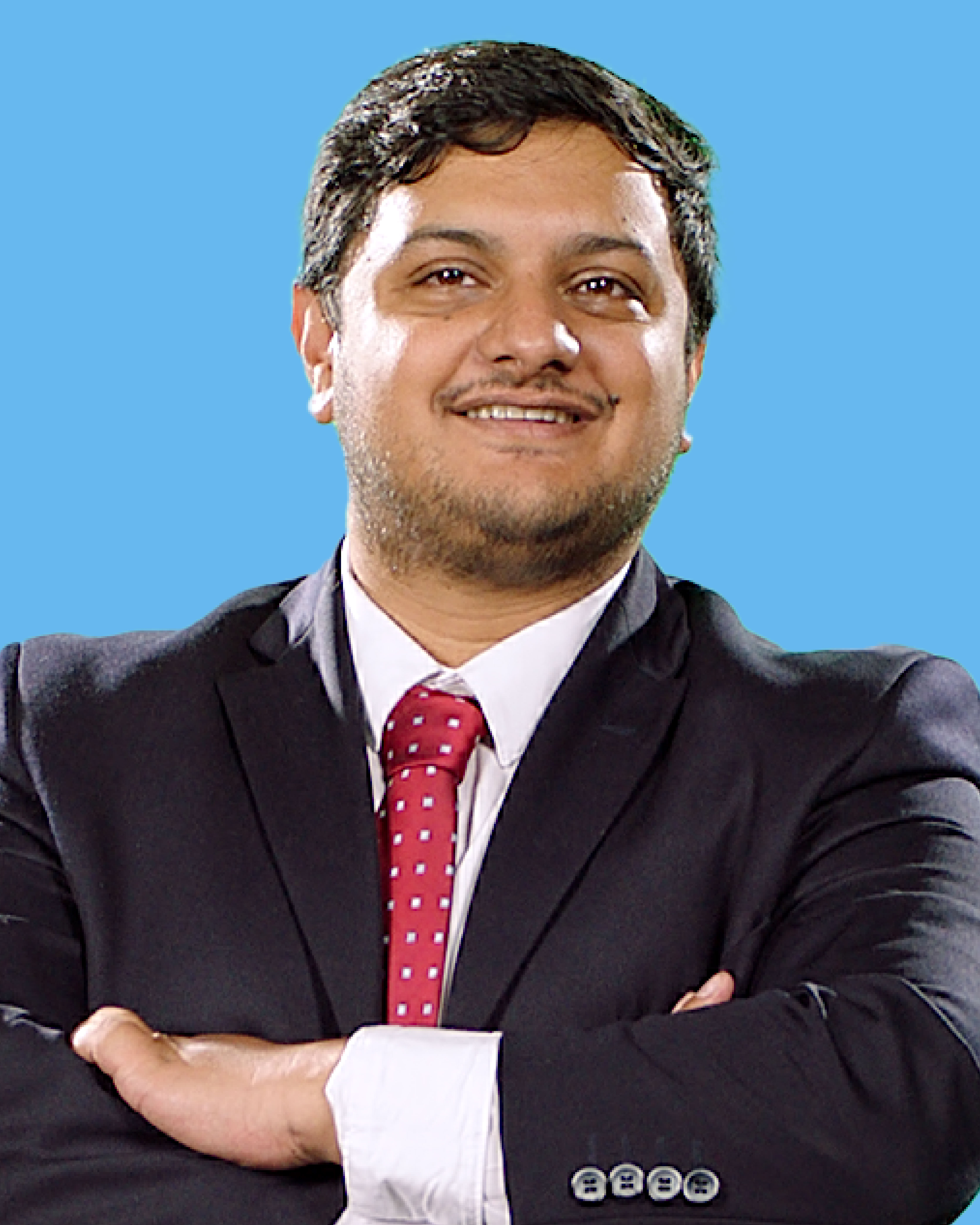
Current Democratic Alliance Federal Council Chair Ashor Sarupen

The Democratic Alliance Federal Council (FedCo) is the governing and policy-making body of the Democratic Alliance, the second-largest political party by number of seats in Parliament in South Africa. It sits when the party's Federal Congress is not in session.

The FedCo has been chaired by Deputy Finance Minister Ashor Sarupen since the Federal Congress. Sarupen has three Deputies to assist him; JP Smith, Thomas Walters, and Carl Pophaim.

The FedCo's main counterpart is the National Executive Committee of the African National Congress.

== Composition ==
The Federal Council consists of the following members:

- All of the Federal Executive (FedEx) members
- The Chairperson of the Federal Legal Commission
- The Provincial Chairpersons and the Provincial Finance Chairpersons
- Regional chairpersons who preside over an area where the party received more than 80,000 votes in the latest general election
- Twenty-four Members of Parliament (MPs)
- Twenty-four Members of the Provincial Legislatures (MPLs)
- Twenty-four municipal councillors
- Twenty-four party members who do not hold public office
- Up to six additional members approved by two-thirds of the members mentioned above
- Two non-voting party staff members designated by each of the nine Provincial Chairpersons
