= VIP Protection Unit (South Africa) =

The VIP Protection Unit (VIPU) is an arm of the South African Police Service responsible for the static and in-transit protection of the president, deputy president, former presidents and deputy presidents, cabinet ministers, MECs and foreign dignitaries.

== History ==
=== Controversy ===
The unit drew criticism in 2009 for on-road bullying tactics. It came to particular prominence in January 2009 following an alleged assault of a civilian who came too close to President Kgalema Motlanthe's vehicle cavalcade. For such actions, the unit received the "blue light gang" moniker. In February 2009, its Gauteng regional boss, Commander Sean Tshabalala, bemoaned the public's lack of respect. Columnist Max du Preez retorted "If you want respect, get out of the cushy cavalcade and go and fight some crime."

== Organization ==
Around 200 persons were integrated into the VIPU due to reforms made in the 1990s in the SAPS.
