= Democratic Alliance (South Africa) =

Political party in South Africa formed in 2000

Democratic Alliance Demokratiese Alliansie
- Abbreviation: DA
- Federal Leader: Geordin Hill-Lewis
- Federal Chairperson: Solly Msimanga
- Deputy Federal Chairpersons: Siviwe Gwarube; Cilliers Brink; Solly Malatsi
- Federal Council Chairperson: Ashor Sarupen
- Deputy Federal Council Chairpersons: JP Smith; Thomas Walters; Carl Pophaim
- Founded: 24 June 2000; 26 years ago
- Preceded by: New National Party; Democratic Party; Federal Alliance
- Student wing: Democratic Alliance Students Organisation
- Youth wing: DA Youth
- Women's wing: DA Women's Network
- Overseas wing: DA Abroad
- Ideology: Liberalism (South African)
- Political position: Centre to centre-right
- International affiliation: Liberal International
- Continental affiliation: Africa Liberal Network
- Colours: Blue
- Slogan: Freedom, Fairness, Opportunity and Diversity
- National Assembly: 87 / 400
- NCOP: 21 / 90
- Pan African Parliament: 1 / 5
- SADC Parliamentary Forum: 1 / 6
- Provincial Legislatures: 89 / 487
- Western Cape: 24 / 42
- Cape Town City Council: 135 / 231

Website
- da.org.za

The Democratic Alliance (DA) is a liberal political party in South Africa, sitting on the centre to centre-right of the political spectrum. It has been the second-largest party in the country since its foundation in 2000. Its main rival is the African National Congress (ANC), which has been the ruling party of South Africa since 1994.

A member of Liberal International and the Africa Liberal Network, the DA traces its roots to the founding of the anti-apartheid Progressive Party in 1959, with many mergers and name changes between that time and the present.

The DA has a variety of ideologically liberal tendencies, including neoliberalism, social liberalism, classical liberalism, and conservative liberalism. The party, considered to be South Africa's most diverse in terms of membership and voters, draws its support predominantly from Afrikaans and English speakers, people aged over 35, white South Africans, Indian/Asian communities, and Coloured communities.

The current leader of the party is the Mayor of Cape Town, Geordin Hill-Lewis, who assumed leadership on 12 April 2026, after the party's Federal Congress. Ashor Sarupen is Chairperson of both the Federal Council and the Federal Executive, the highest decision-making structures of the party.

The DA has governed Cape Town, South Africa's legislative capital and second-largest city by population, since the 2006 municipal elections. The party has also governed the Western Cape, one of the country's nine provinces, with a majority since the 2009 general election. In the aftermath of the 2024 general election, the DA entered into a ruling grand coalition with the African National Congress (ANC) and various other parties, called a government of national unity, formed by ten parties holding a combined 287 seats in the National Assembly of South Africa (72%).

== History ==
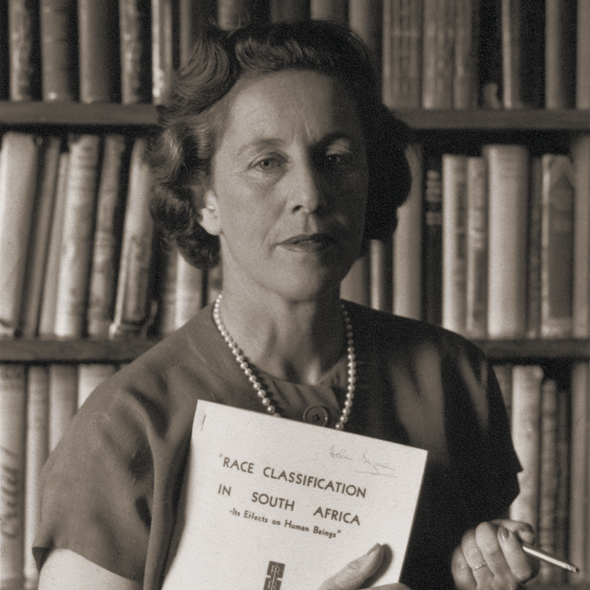
Helen Suzman

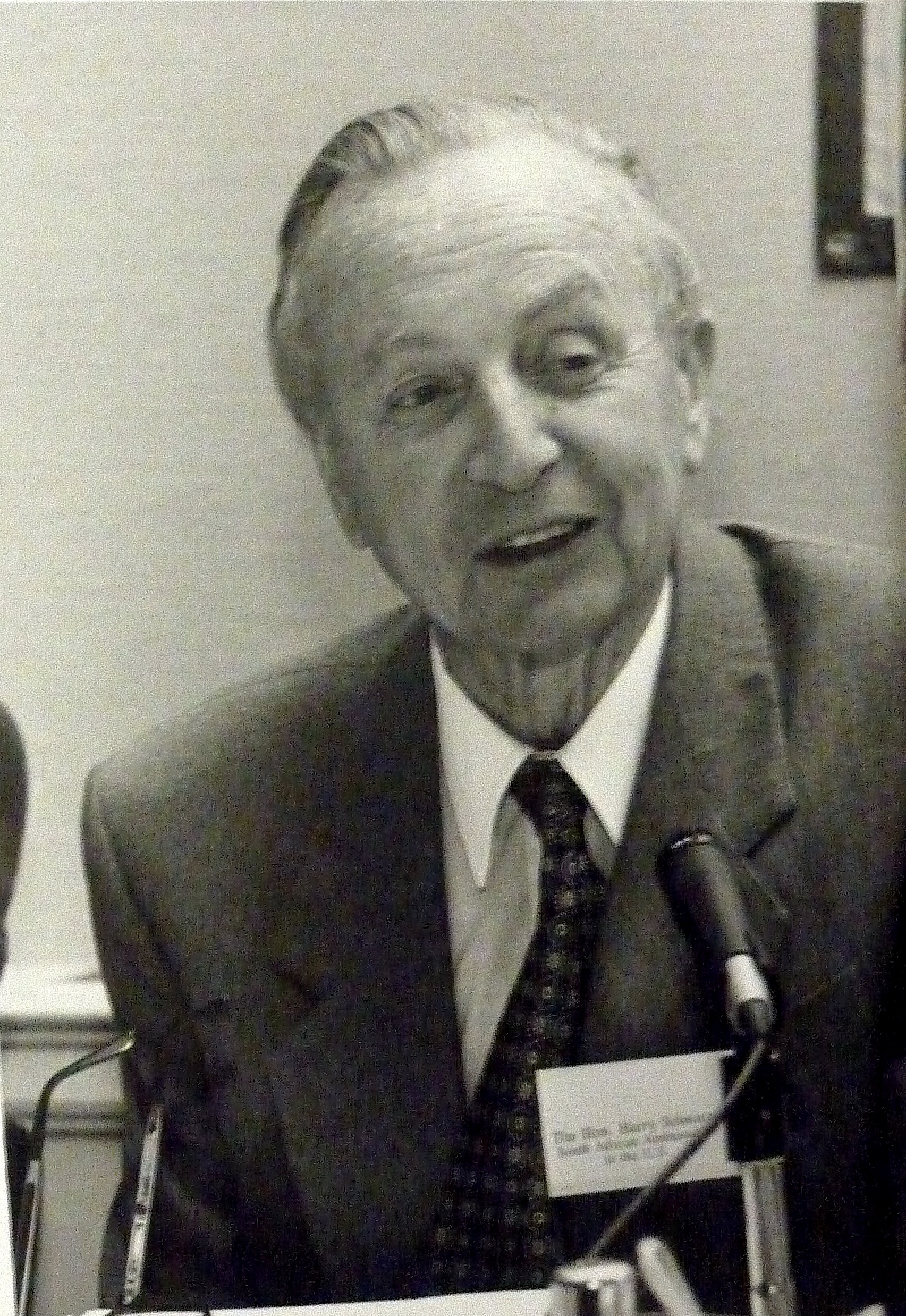
Harry Schwarz

Helen Suzman and Harry Schwarz, who were prominent anti-apartheid campaigners during the 1960s, 1970s and 1980s

=== Beginnings in the Democratic Party ===
Although the Democratic Alliance in its present form is fairly new, its roots can be traced far back in South African political history, through a complex sequence of splits and mergers. The modern day DA is in large part a product of the white parliamentary opposition to the ruling National Party.

The origin of the party can be traced to the mid-1950s when some younger members of the United Party felt that they were not providing strong enough opposition to the National Party and its policy of Apartheid, causing them to break away and form the Progressive Party in 1959.

In the 1970s, as it rose to become the official opposition, the party merged with more splinters from the disintegrating United Party, and become known first as the Progressive Reform Party, and then as the Progressive Federal Party. The Progressives sought to change the system from within, but in doing so chose to comply with Apartheid legislation outlawing multi-racial membership.

During this time, the party was led by liberal-minded opponents of Apartheid, such as Jan Steytler, Helen Suzman, Zach de Beer, Colin Eglin, Frederik van Zyl Slabbert and Harry Schwarz. In 1989, it merged with the National Democratic Movement and the Independent Party to become the Democratic Party (DP), a name that was retained into the 1990s when freedom was achieved. It was marginalised by the National Party's shift towards the center after 1990, and fared relatively poorly in the first democratic election in 1994, won by the African National Congress.

The DP established itself as a more effective party of opposition, however, and eventually rose from relative obscurity and ascended to the status of official opposition in 1999 under the leadership of Tony Leon, mainly by taking votes from the New National Party, the renamed version of the NP.

The party also became kingmakers in the Western Cape province, where it formed a coalition government with the NNP. With a fractured national opposition standing against an increasingly dominant governing party, there was a perceived need to better challenge the ANC. To this end, the DP reached a merger agreement with the NNP and the much smaller Federal Alliance (FA) in 2000.

Together, they formed the Democratic Alliance. The merger was ultimately aborted, with both the NNP and FA leaving the DA. Many former NNP members remained, and the new name was kept. The DP was disbanded after the 2003 floor crossing period, establishing the DA at all levels of government in South Africa.

=== After becoming the Democratic Alliance in 2003 ===
Logo of the DA used between 2000 and 2008

The party consolidated its status as the official opposition in the 2004 general election, while the NNP collapsed. Having gone into opposition in the Western Cape in 2001 when the NNP formed a new coalition with the ANC, the demise of the NNP made the province a natural target for the party.

In the 2006 municipal elections, the DA narrowly gained control of its largest city, Cape Town, in a multi-party coalition. Helen Zille, the then-Mayor of Cape Town, succeeded Leon as DA Leader in May 2007. In 2008, she re-launched the party as one that no longer acts solely as an opposition but also as an alternative choice for government.

The party also introduced a new logo and a new slogan. Zille said the new DA would be, "more reflective of our rich racial, linguistic, and cultural heritage," and emphasized that she wanted it to be a "party for all the people" and not decline into a "shrinking, irrelevant minority."

Continuing its growth, in the 2009 South African general election, the DA won an overall majority in the Western Cape, and Zille became the new provincial premier. In her newsletter, she wrote that, "winning power in the Western Cape will allow us to show what cooperative governance between local authorities and a province can achieve." In the 2011 local government elections, the party won control of most of the municipalities in the Western Cape.

In 2013, the DA launched the "Know Your DA" campaign, in an attempt to try to show that the DA (via its proxy predecessor organisations) was involved in the struggle against apartheid. This campaign focused mainly on the role played by a few key individuals in opposing apartheid – particularly Helen Suzman and Helen Zille.

The campaign received a certain amount of media attention, much of it somewhat sceptical. The ANC issued a detailed critique of the campaign, focusing especially on Suzman's role in the apartheid parliament. Partially on the basis of this campaign the DA contested the 2014 general election, where it once again grew its support base but failed in its stated goal of winning Gauteng province.

In the municipal elections of 2016, the DA made significant gains along with other opposition parties in some of the country's most important metropolitan areas. The DA currently governs Tshwane (including Pretoria, the administrative capital), Cape Town (South Africa's second-largest city and legislative capital) and various other municipalities.

In the general elections of 2019, the DA's national support declined for the first time in its history. The party retained control of the Western Cape but with a reduced majority and failed to win Gauteng once again. The conservative Freedom Front Plus (FF+) made significant gains on the DA in the Afrikaner community. In the aftermath of the election, the FF+ continued to make inroads in former DA strongholds.

=== Recent developments ===
In the run-up to the 2024 general election, the DA joined the Multi-Party Charter, an electoral alliance taking advantage of the unpopularity of the ANC. The ANC failed to gain a majority of seats in the National Assembly after the election, leading to the DA agreeing to form a coalition of national unity (Third Cabinet of Cyril Ramaphosa), entering ruling government for the first time.

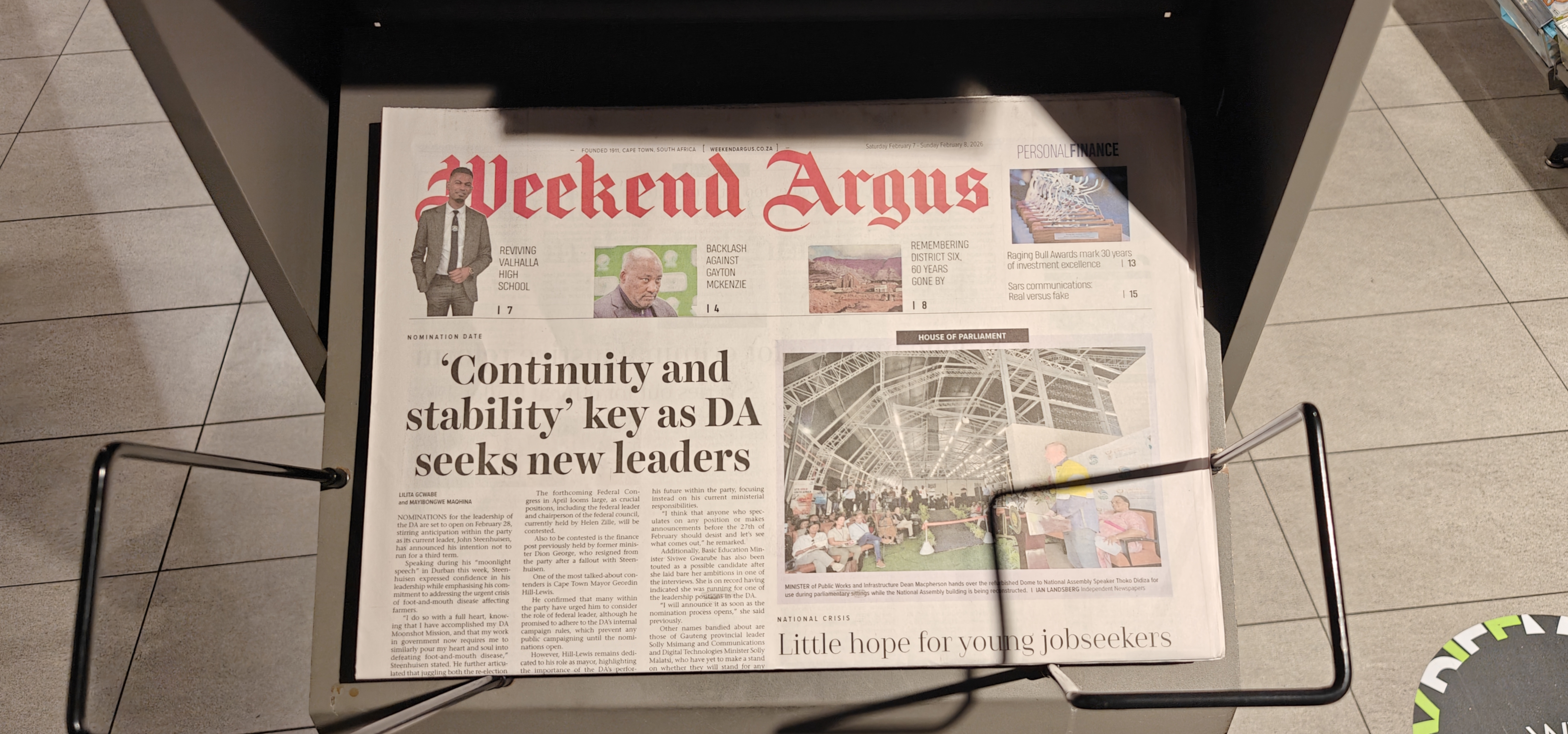
Newspaper with headline about the DA's leadership change, in a Cape Town Woolworths, in February 2026

On 4 February 2026, DA Leader John Steenhuisen announced that he would be stepping down from his party leadership role, to focus exclusively on his portfolio as Minister of Agriculture. During his speech in his hometown of Durban, Steenhuisen highlighted the major success of the DA, under his leadership, of joining the ruling national government for the first time, after the party played a major role in the formation of the Government of National Unity (GNU).

The decision to step down as DA Leader was widely viewed to open the door for highly popular Cape Town Mayor Geordin Hill-Lewis. Cape Town has held the status of South Africa's best-administered metropolitan area for numerous years. Under DA leadership at the City of Cape Town, the city has passed multiple consecutive clean audits, handed over the highest number of affordable housing units to applicants, and spearheaded multiple major public infrastructure development projects (including one that was the largest in the country's history). Hill-Lewis announced his candidacy for DA Leader on 27 February 2026.

At the DA's Federal Congress in April 2026, Hill-Lewis was elected DA leader, defeating the DA's caucus leader in Sedibeng District Municipality, Sibusiso Dyonase. The party's Gauteng provincial leader Solly Msimanga was elected Federal Chairperson, the party's second-highest position, having defeated incumbent Ivan Meyer. Deputy Finance Minister Ashor Sarupen won the election to succeed Helen Zille as Chairperson of the Federal Council.

In June 2026, the party's head of policy and Member of Parliament Mathew Cuthbert was appointed the party's new Chief Executive Officer (CEO). Cuthbert filled the position nearly five years after the previous CEO Simon Dickinson resigned following a year in the role.

=== Formation and mergers ===
- 1959 – Progressive Party breaks away from United Party.
- 1975 – Progressive Party merges with Harry Schwarz's Reform Party, to form Progressive Reform Party.
- 1977 – Progressive Reform Party merges with the Committee for a United Opposition to form the Progressive Federal Party.
- 1989 – PFP merges with Denis Worrall's Independent Party and Wynand Malan's National Democratic Movement, to form Democratic Party.
- 2000 – Democratic Party merges with the New National Party and the Federal Alliance, to form the Democratic Alliance.
- 2001 – New National Party quits the Democratic Alliance and later merges with the ANC (2005).
- 2010 – Democratic Alliance begins absorbing Patricia de Lille's Independent Democrats.
- 2011 – Democratic Alliance absorbs Ziba Jiyane's South African Democratic Convention.

=== Federal Leaders ===
- Tony Leon, 2000 - 2007
- Helen Zille, 2007 - 2015
- Mmusi Maimane, 2015 - 2019
- John Steenhuisen, 2019 - 2026
- Geordin Hill-Lewis, 2026 - present

== Ideology and principles ==
The DA is variously described as centre-left, centrist to a centre-right party. the DA sums up its political philosophy as the belief in an "Open Opportunity Society for All". Former party leader Helen Zille has argued that this stands in direct contrast to the ruling ANC's approach to governance, which she maintains has led to a "closed, crony society for some". This formed the basis of the philosophy underlying the party's 2009 Election Manifesto, which seeks to build a society by linking outcomes to "opportunity, effort and ability".

The DA's historical roots are broadly liberal-democratic. During the 1990s, the party remained associated with liberal values, though party leader Tony Leon's support for the reintroduction of the death penalty, the party's controversial 1999 campaign slogan "Fight Back", and the short-lived alliance with the centre-right New National Party fuelled criticisms of the party from the left. After Helen Zille's election as party leader, the DA has attempted to reposition itself as a mainstream alternative to the ANC. The party's economic policy is also broadly centrist, and supports a mix of high spending on crucial social services such as education and health care, a basic income grant, and a strong regulatory framework, with more "moderate" policies such as a lower budget deficit and a deregulated labour market. At her 2009 State of the Province speech, party leader Zille described her party's economic policy as pragmatic: "We believe the state has a crucial role to play in socio-economic development. We are not free market fundamentalists. By the same token we do not believe that a state, with limited capacity, should over-reach itself."

=== Current policies ===
==== Crime ====
In the DA's crime plan, "Conquering Fear, Commanding Hope", the DA committed itself to increasing the number of police officers to 250,000. This is 60,000 more than the government's own target. The party also announced plans to employ 30,000 additional detectives and forensics experts and 500 more prosecutors, in order to reduce court backlogs, and establish a Directorate for Victims of Crime, which would provide funding and support for crime victims.

In addition, the party announced its support for a prison labour programme, which would put prisoners to work in various community upliftment programmes. The proposal was criticised by labour unions, who believed it was unethical and would result in labour job losses.

In late 2008–2009, the DA took a stand against the South African Police Service's VIP Protection Unit, after several officers in the unit were charged with serious criminal offences. The party later released documentation of the unit's poor disciplinary record, and claimed its divisional commander had himself dodged serious criminal charges.

The DA strongly opposed the disbandment of the Scorpions crime investigation unit, and similar efforts to centralise the police service such as the nationwide disbandment of specialised Family Violence, Child Protection and Sexual Offences (FCS) units.

The party adopted a resolution declaring farm attacks and murders as hate crimes at its 2020 Federal Congress.

Following the election of Geordin Hill-Lewis as Federal Leader in April 2026, the DA intensified its focus on crime, with Hill-Lewis describing crime as a national crisis and saying that South Africans could not be truly free if they did not feel safe in their homes, schools and businesses. In May 2026, the party set out a 100-day crime plan that included lifestyle audits of police officers, rebuilding Crime Intelligence and giving local governments a greater role in crime prevention.

==== Social development ====
Central to the DA's social development policy, "Breaking the Cycle of Poverty", is a Basic Income Grant, which would provide a monthly transfer of R110 to all adults earning less than R46,000 per year. The party also supports legislation that would require the legal guardians of children living in poverty to ensure that their child attends 85 per cent of school classes, and undergoes routine health check-ups.

In addition, to aid with youth development skills, the party proposed a R6000 opportunity voucher or twelve month community service programme to all high school matriculants. The party also supports a universal old age pension, and the abolishment of pension means tests.

==== Education ====
The DA's education programme, "Preparing for Success", focuses on providing adequate physical and human resources to underperforming schools. The DA supports guaranteed access to a core minimum of resources for each school, proper state school nutrition schemes for grade 1–12 learners, and measures to train 30,000 additional teachers per year. The DA continues to support the introduction of new performance targets for teachers and schools, and also advocates a per-child wage subsidy, and a national network of community-based early childhood education centres.

==== Health ====
The DA's "Quality Care for All" programme is focused on tackling the country's high HIV/AIDS infection rate. Included in these plans is an increase in the number of clinics offering HIV testing and measures to provide all HIV-positive women with Nevirapine. The party's health policy also plans to devote more resources to vaccinations against common childhood illnesses.

The party also advocates creating a transparent and competitive health sector, to boost service delivery and encourage health care practitioners to remain in the country.

==== Economy ====
The DA's economic policy aims to create a society in which all South Africans enjoy both the fundamental freedoms guaranteed by the Constitution, and the opportunities to take advantage of those freedoms. In its 2010 Federal Congress booklet, The Open Opportunity Society for All, the party describes this society in the following terms: "Opportunity is the vehicle with which people are empowered to live their lives, pursue their dreams and develop their full potential. And the DA believes that the role of the government is to provide every citizen with a minimum basic standard of quality services and resources with which to be able to do so – a framework for choice."

The DA therefore advocates a mixed-economy approach, where the state is involved in the economy only to the extent that it can expand opportunity and choice.

The manifesto includes various proposals detailing how a DA government would manage the economy and facilitate growth. The majority of the interventions suggested by the party are aimed at creating an atmosphere conducive to job creation and greater foreign direct investment.

The DA has suggested measures to make South Africa's labour market more amenable to job creation. The party has also suggested several targeted interventions to allow for higher employment, especially amongst the youth. These interventions include a wage subsidy programme to reduce the cost of hiring first-time workers.

The DA has committed itself to a counter-cyclical fiscal policy approach. This is evident in the party's previous alternative budget frameworks, with both alternative budgets posting deficits. The party defended this stance by arguing that increased spending was necessary to help the economy out of recession. Other fiscal interventions have included a proposed scrapping of value added tax (VAT) on books and tax rebates for crime prevention expenditure by businesses.

The DA supports an inflation-targeting monetary policy regime similar to that of the ANC government. It has also repeatedly reaffirmed its support and commitment for reserve bank instrument independence. The DA proposes to incentivise savings by reducing taxes on income earned from fixed deposits that are held for longer than twelve months. The party states that this would help South Africa to boost its domestic savings rate to enable the country to invest in projects that will provide additional job opportunities.

The party has rejected the ANC's approach to Black Economic Empowerment, with former party leader Helen Zille arguing that the current policies have only served to enrich a small elite of politically connected businessmen. The party proposed an alternative it calls broad-based economic empowerment, which would provide for targeted interventions focusing on skills training and socio-economic investment instead of ownership targets. The party believes that this approach will give a broader group of black South Africans an opportunity to compete and partake in the economy.

The party advocates an active industrial policy that allows the Industrial Development Corporation (IDC) to co-ordinate industrial policy. Additionally it would also set up a sovereign venture capital fund to help support innovation in key industries. The DA also supports the creation of Industrial Development Zones and Export Processing Zones. The party suggests that by relaxing certain regulations in these zones, manufacturers and exporters would be able to grow faster and employ more people. This fits into the party's broader vision of growing the economy by cutting red tape and regulations it claims is holding back South Africa's economic growth.

The DA has been against the introduction of a national minimum wage, arguing that workers should be allowed to accept a wage of less than R3500 on their own terms. In contrast, President Cyril Ramaphosa stated that the R3500 per month (R20 an hour) minimum wage was still not a living wage, and would only "advance the struggle for a living wage".

==== Land ====
The DA is resolutely against land expropriation without compensation. This is in response to the ANC and the Economic Freedom Fighters (EFF) recent attempts to change section 25 of the Constitution which deals with land reform. The DA says that changing the Constitution will open the floodgates and undermine property rights, allowing government to own all land and forcing all South Africans to be only permanent tenants of the land. The party says that it is committed to ensuring that those entitled to land receive it in the form of direct ownership, and not as lifelong tenants.

The DA's "Land of Opportunity" programme supports the "willing buyer, willing seller" principle, though it also allows for expropriation for reform purposes in certain limited circumstances. The party has been critical of the resources that government has allocated to land reform, claiming that government has not been sufficiently active in buying up land that comes onto the market. Though the DA believes this could speed up the pace of land reform, their policies have been vocally criticised by members of the Tripartite Alliance. Land Affairs Minister Thoko Didiza accused the DA of attempting to "stifle" land reform, while the South African Communist Party contended that the DA's policies overly favoured big business. In a speech at the DA's national congress in April 2018, DA Leader, Mmusi Maimane, praised DA Western Cape Provincial Leader, Bonginkosi Madikizela, for overseeing the delivery of 91 000 title deeds in the province and allowing residents to have full title deeds to their homes.

==== Environment and energy ====
In the build up to the 2009 elections, the DA announced it would create a new Ministry of Energy and Climate Change, to ensure improved integrated energy planning in order to deal with South Africa's growing carbon dioxide emissions. The DA's 2009 environment and energy plan, "In Trust for the Nation" proposed new measures to increase energy efficiency, and the introduction of sectoral carbon emission targets.

==== Electoral reform ====
The DA broadly supports reforms recommended by Frederik van Zyl Slabbert's electoral reform task-team, that would see the current party list voting system replaced by a 75% constituency-based/25% proportional representation-based electoral system that would apply at the national and provincial level. The DA's governance policy Promoting Open Opportunity Governance also makes provision for the direct election of the president, which would give voters a more direct link to the executive branch.

The DA believe voting rights should be extended to include all South African citizens who are living and working abroad, many of whom intend returning. Since 2013, South Africans living abroad can now register and vote in national elections.

==== Foreign policy ====
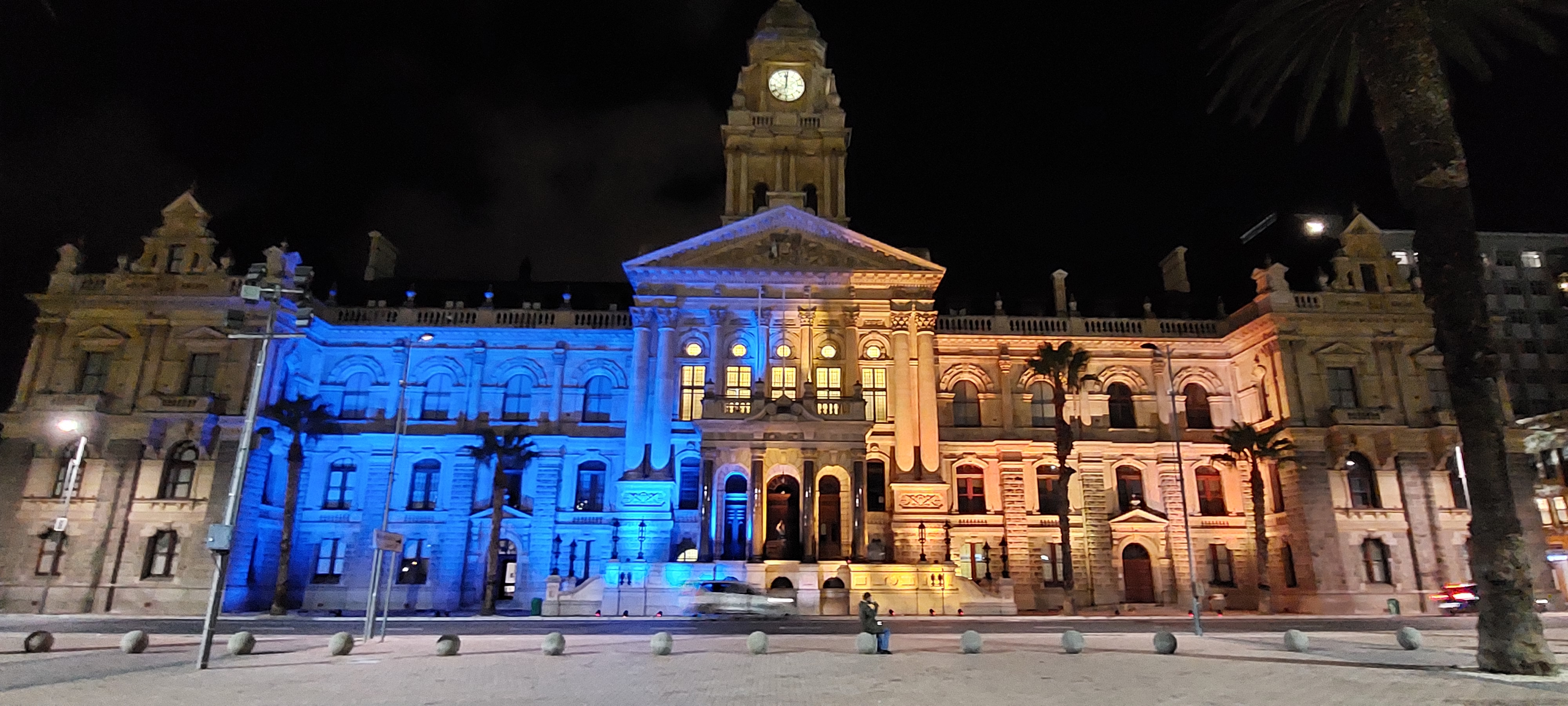
Cape Town City Hall, the meeting place for the DA-controlled Cape Town City Council, was lit up in blue and yellow (the colours of the Ukrainian flag) in solidarity with Ukraine in following the 2022 Russian invasion of Ukraine.

The DA holds a relatively pro-Western foreign policy.

The DA has been a strong supporter of Ukraine during the Russo-Ukrainian War. South Africa, a member of the BRICS alliance, has remained neutral throughout the Russian invasion of Ukraine, but the DA (including DA-controlled legislatures and councils) supports Ukraine and has criticised South Africa's ambiguous position, though the ANC has denied supporting Russia and insists that it is neutral. Steenhuisen visited Ukraine in 2022 in solidarity. The party has also called for Russian President Vladimir Putin to be arrested.

Unlike the ANC, which outspokenly declared its support for Palestine and refused to condemn Hamas for its attacks on Israel on 7 October 2023, the DA, along with other members of the Multi-Party Charter, specifically condemned Hamas for its attacks on Israel. However, the DA, like the ANC, supports a two state solution to the Israel-Palestine conflict, seeking peaceful resolution between the two, and for Palestine to be free, saying "the people of Palestine are not defined by Hamas". In January 2024, the DA welcomed the International Court of Justice's decision on Gaza, calling upon Israel to comply with them in order to prevent genocide.

== Organisation and structure ==
=== Democratic Alliance Youth ===
The Democratic Alliance Youth (DA Youth), which came officially into being in late 2008, was first led by Makashule Gana until 2013, Mbali Ntuli led between 2013 and 2014, Yusuf Cassim led from 2014 to 2018 and Luyolo Mphithi led from 2018 to 2022. The current Interim Federal Leader, Nicholas Nyati, was elected at the Interim Democratic Alliance Youth Federal Congress in 2022. Robin Atson, Kamogelo Makola, Chadwin Petersen and Lindokuhle Sixabayi are the Interim DA Youth Federal Deputy Chaipersons in Administration, Recruitment, Training and Development, and Media and Publicity, respectively.

In the Gauteng Province, the first dually elected Democratic Alliance Youth Provincial Executive Committee took office in November 2017 after they were elected at the Gauteng Provincial Congress the same year. It consists of Pogiso Mthimunye (chairperson), Patrick Oberholster (deputy chairperson), Khathutshelo Rasilingwane (Recruitment and Campaigns) and Prudence Mollo (Training and Development).

In the North West Province of South Africa, Emi Koekemoer is the elected Provincial Chairperson while Henning Lubbe takes the role as Provincial Deputy Chairperson of Administration, Quinton Booysen fills the role of Provincial Deputy Chairperson of Recruitment and Campaigns, Percilla Mompe is the Provincial Deputy Chairperson of Media and Publicity and Neo Mabote is the Provincial Deputy Chairperson of Training and Development.

=== Democratic Alliance Women's Network ===
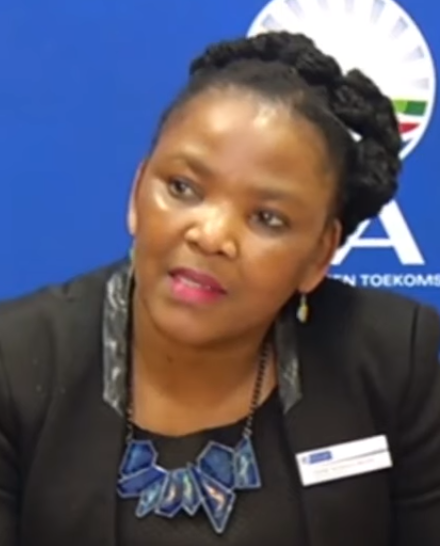
Nomafrench Mbombo, the most recent DAWN leader

Until 28 April 2021, the Democratic Alliance Women's Network (DAWN) federal leader was Nomafrench Mbombo, who is also the current Western Cape Minister of Health. The deputy federal leader is Safiyia Stanfley.

According to the DAWN constitution:

DAWN will:

- promote the empowerment and development of women and help build their self-confidence to stimulate and activate initiatives.
- promote amongst women a consciousness of accountability, patriotism and unity.
- promote women's participation in every sector of public life.
- promote a healthy culture of the recognition of women's rights as human rights.
- oppose violence against women wherever possible.

Each province has a provincial DAWN chairperson. The provincial chairpersons are as follows:

- Eastern Cape: Nomvano Zibonda
- Free State: Mildred Faro
- Gauteng: Vacant
- KwaZulu-Natal: Remona Mackenzie
- Limpopo: Thelma Mafunzwaini
- Mpumalanga: Mariaan Chamberlain
- Northern Cape: Fawzia Rhoda
- North-West: Vacant
- Western Cape: Vacant

=== Democratic Alliance Abroad ===
The DA Abroad is the Democratic Alliance's supporters network for South Africans who live outside the South African border. The DA Abroad aims to grow the DA's overseas voter base, actively lobby for international awareness and influence for the furtherance of policies and action programmes of the DA and develop a global interconnected community that supports an open opportunity society for all.

The Democratic Alliance Abroad (DA Abroad) was officially launched in November 2009. Previously the DA Abroad was led by Ludre Stevens between 2009 and 2015 and then by Francine Higham between 2015 and 2019 with Morné Van der Waltsleben as Global Operations Chair from 2013 to 2017. Between 2019 and 2021 it was led by Rory Jubber with Nigel Bruce acting as chairperson. On 27 August 2021, Ludre Stevens was elected unopposed as DA Abroad Leader.

The DA Abroad has hubs in the UK, North America, Europe, Africa, Asia and Australasia.

=== Democratic Alliance Young Leaders Programme ===
The DA's Young Leaders Programme (YLP) is a political leadership development programme for South Africans between the ages of 18 and 35.

== Support base ==
According to 2024 polling data the DA's support base is racially diverse, drawn mostly from the Coloured, Indian, and White racial minority groups, with a strong support base in major metropolitan areas and the Western Cape Province where the party is dominant. Supporters tend to be older, with 70.8% of supporters being over 40 years old; are more likely to be employed, are more likely to be higher income earners, and reside in urban areas. White voters constitute the largest single demographic group within the party's support base at 43.4%, followed by Coloured voters at 19.6%, Black voters at 18%, and Indian voters at 8.9%. This racial composition distinguishes the DA from other major South African parties, whose support bases are considerably more racially homogeneous.

== Criticisms and controversies ==
=== Accusations of racism ===
The Democratic Alliance is often accused by its critics in the media, and rival political parties, of being a "white party" although polling indicates that more than half (56.6%) of their support base is non-white.

In 2017, the former leader of the party, Helen Zille, wrote on her Twitter profile: "For those claiming legacy of colonialism was ONLY [sic] negative, think of our independent judiciary, transport infrastructure, piped water etc." This statement, among others, was accused of defending South Africa's colonial history, and Zille apologized. Public Protector Busisiwe Mkhwebane stated that Zille should be sanctioned by the provincial legislature. The South African Human Rights Commission started investigations into the matter. Zille was disciplined by the DA for these statements.

In 2019, some commentators speculated that the resignation of the former party's leader, Mmusi Maimane, was a sign of "racial tensions in the party".

In 2024, Minister of Agriculture John Steenhuisen appointed Roman Cabanac, a Youtube commentator, as the chief of staff in his ministerial office. Following Cabanac's appointment he was described by the EFF and City Press newspaper as being "racist and a Nazi-sympathiser" for past comments leading to additional accusations of the DA as a whole of "being white supremacist". Steenhuisen admitted to "making a mistake" and as a result, Cabanac's contract was terminated in June 2025. Cabanac stated that he was the target of a successful smear campaign and that the comments in question were willfully taken out of context.

== Electoral performance ==
Proportion of votes cast for the DA in the 2014 election, by ward 0–20% 20–40% 40–60% 60–80% 80–100%

The DA's performance by region in the 2024 South African general election.

These charts show the electoral performance for the Democratic Alliance, and its predecessor the Democratic Party, since the advent of democracy in 1994:

=== National elections ===
==== National Assembly ====
| Election | Leader | Total votes | Share of vote | Seats | +/– | Result |
|---|---|---|---|---|---|---|
| 1994 | Zach de Beer | 338,426 | 1.73% | 7 / 400 | – | Opposition |
| 1999 | Tony Leon | 1,527,337 | 9.56% | 38 / 400 | ▲31 | Official opposition |
| 2004 | Tony Leon | 1,931,201 | 12.37% | 50 / 400 | ▲12 | Official opposition |
| 2009 | Helen Zille | 2,945,829 | 16.66% | 67 / 400 | ▲17 | Official opposition |
| 2014 | Helen Zille | 4,091,584 | 22.20% | 89 / 400 | ▲22 | Official opposition |
| 2019 | Mmusi Maimane | 3,621,188 | 20.77% | 84 / 400 | ▼5 | Official opposition |
| 2024 | John Steenhuisen | 3,505,735 | 21.81% | 87 / 400 | ▲3 | National Unity coalition |

==== National Council of Provinces ====
| Election | Total # of seats won | +/– | Result |
|---|---|---|---|
| 1994 | 3 / 90 | – | Opposition |
| 1999 | 8 / 90 | ▲5 | Official opposition |
| 2004 | 12 / 90 | ▲4 | Official opposition |
| 2009 | 13 / 90 | ▲1 | Official opposition |
| 2014 | 20 / 90 | ▲7 | Official opposition |
| 2019 | 20 / 90 | 0 | Official opposition |
| 2024 | 20 / 90 | 0 | National Unity coalition |

=== Provincial elections ===
| Election | Eastern Cape | | Free State | | Gauteng | | Kwazulu-Natal | | Limpopo | | Mpumalanga | | North-West | | Northern Cape | | Western Cape | |
| Election | % | Seats | % | Seats | % | Seats | % | Seats | % | Seats | % | Seats | % | Seats | % | Seats | % | Seats |
|---|---|---|---|---|---|---|---|---|---|---|---|---|---|---|---|---|---|---|
| 1994 | 2.05 | 1/56 | 0.57 | 0/30 | 5.32 | 5/86 | 2.15 | 2/81 | 0.21 | 0/40 | 0.56 | 0/30 | 0.50 | 0/30 | 1.87 | 1/30 | 6.64 | 3/42 |
| 1999 | 6.29 | 4/63 | 5.33 | 2/30 | 17.95 | 13/73 | 8.16 | 7/80 | 1.42 | 1/49 | 4.48 | 1/30 | 3.26 | 1/30 | 4.77 | 1/30 | 11.91 | 5/42 |
| 2004 | 7.34 | 5/63 | 8.47 | 3/30 | 20.78 | 15/73 | 8.35 | 7/80 | 3.59 | 2/49 | 6.94 | 2/30 | 5.00 | 2/33 | 11.08 | 3/30 | 27.11 | 12/42 |
| 2009 | 9.99 | 6/63 | 11.60 | 3/30 | 21.86 | 16/73 | 9.15 | 7/80 | 3.48 | 2/49 | 7.49 | 2/30 | 8.25 | 3/33 | 12.57 | 4/30 | 51.46 | 22/42 |
| 2014 | 16.20 | 10/63 | 16.23 | 5/30 | 30.78 | 23/73 | 12.76 | 10/80 | 6.48 | 3/49 | 10.40 | 3/30 | 12.73 | 4/33 | 23.89 | 7/30 | 59.38 | 26/42 |
| 2019 | 15.73 | 10/63 | 17.58 | 6/30 | 27.45 | 20/73 | 13.90 | 11/80 | 5.40 | 3/49 | 9.77 | 3/30 | 11.18 | 4/33 | 25.51 | 8/30 | 55.45 | 24/42 |
| 2024 | 14.89 | 11/73 | 21.88 | 7/30 | 27.44 | 22/80 | 13.36 | 11/80 | 5.96 | 4/64 | 12.02 | 6/51 | 13.24 | 5/38 | 21.19 | 7/30 | 55.30 | 24/42 |

DA 2026 municipal election poster in Cape Town

=== Municipal election results ===
| Election | Ward + PR votes | % | +/– |
|---|---|---|---|
| 1995–96 | 302,006 | 3.48% | – |
| 2000 | 3,816,909 | 22.1% | ▲18.6 |
| 2006 | 3,203,896 | 16.3% | ▼5.8 |
| 2011 | 6,393,886 | 23.9% | ▲9.1 |
| 2016 | 8,033,630 | 26.9% | ▲3.0 |
| 2021 | 5,082,664 | 21.66% | ▼5.2 |
| 2026 | | 24.64% | ▲2.98 |

== See also ==
- Liberalism
- Contributions to liberal theory
- Liberalism worldwide
- List of liberal parties
- Liberal democracy
- Liberalism in South Africa
- Anti-racism
- Multi-Party Charter
