= Eddie Bourke =

South African politician and businessman

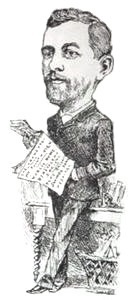
- Character sketch drawn of Eddie Bourke in 1891

Mayor of Pretoria
- In office 1903–1904
- Preceded by: Office Established
- Succeeded by: Andrew Johnstone

Personal details
- Born: 27 January 1852 Maritzburg, Colony of Natal
- Died: 30 August 1926 (aged 74) Pretoria
- Occupation: Businessman, politician.

Edmund Francis Bourke (27 January 1852 – 30 August 1926) was a South African politician and businessman who served as a member of the Transvaal Legislative Council and the first mayor of Pretoria.

== Biography ==
Eddie Bourke was born in Maritzburg, in the British Colony of Natal. He was the eldest son of John Bourke and Hannah Stadler. John Bourke was an Irish pioneer of the Colony of Natal originally from Castlegar in Ireland.

Bourke attended Maritzburg College. After learning accounting from Messrs. A. Fass & Co. Bourke left Natal for the Transvaal in 1877 and accepted the management of Mr. Henry Russell's business (one of the oldest in Pretoria), in January of that year. In 1878, Bourke was recalled to Natal to take temporary charge of Messrs. A. Fass and Co's business in Durban. He returned finally to the Transvaal early in 1879. Shortly after his return, the well—known general merchant firm of Bourke & Co. was established.

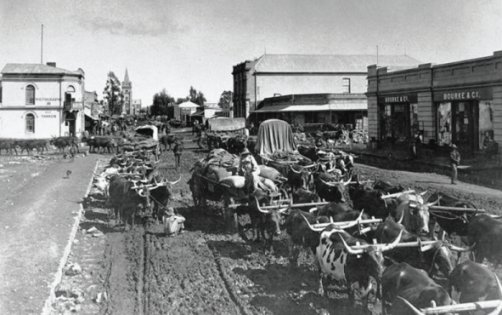
Bourke & Co. shown on the right ca. 1890s

Bourke became good friends with many prominent South African politicians and businessmen of his time including George Jesse Heys and President Paul Kruger with whom he had a close friendship. Bourke and Heys became good business associates in various fields, one of which included a gold mine near Machadodorp.

Bourke & Co carried on for many years until Bourke resigned its direction to the care of his brothers while he himself took over the control of the Bourke Estate and Trust Company of which he was chairman. Bourke was director of numerous smaller companies and is largely interested in farming and other agricultural pursuits. He took part in the early development of the great gold mining industries, but without any very great measure of financial success. Throughout the stirring days of Barberton's beginnings, and the initial mining in the district of Witwatersrand, he remained steadily at work in Pretoria, although none of his local ventures proved really successful. Bourke was a well known patron of sports and athletics. His interest in Pretoria cricket was very keen, and he arranged for visits from the famous cricketers like Bill Brockwell, Albert Trott, and Len Braund. In his early days Bourke was captain of the Maritzburg Rugby team, and took a hearty interest in the game throughout his life. Bourke was an avid golfer and endeavored to wake up public interest in wildlife game protection and served for a time as Chairman of the Transvaal Game Protection Association.

In 1880 Eddie Bourke was elected to both the Transvaal Volksraad and to Pretoria's City Council where he first held a seat in the Water & Sanitation Commission. Here his prominence as a public servant grew. Bourke married Eleanor Griffin who was the daughter of Irish immigrants Henry Griffin and Mary Anne Jefferson.

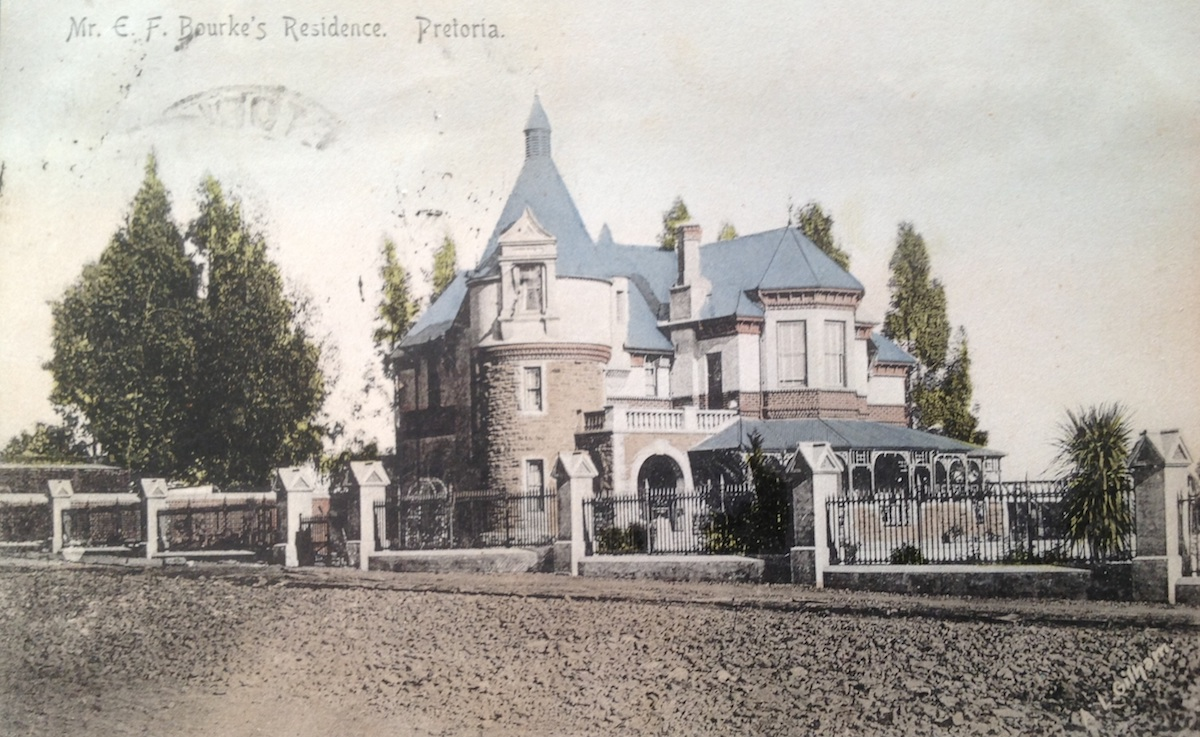
Barton Keep in 1906

His first home was a small house at the corner of the present day Sisulu and Jeff Masemola Streets. This house is still standing. With the arrival of five daughters (two sons were born much later) the Bourke family needed a much larger house and the first plans for the construction of a larger house down the road were discussed in 1885. Bourke went to the Netherlands where the design and final plans were completed. All the material used was imported from England and the Netherlands and a number of Dutch builders were employed. The house was completed between by 1888 and Bourke named the house Barton Keep.

In 1891, Bourke became the first president of the brand new Pretoria Chamber of Commerce. He Became well known for his involvement in many charitable or philanthropic activities. He financed hospitals and schools like St Ethelreda School for Girls (known today as St Mary's Diocesan School for Girls).

The outbrake of the South African War (or Second Anglo-Boer War) had devastating consequences for him. Apart from having rooted business instrests with both the Transvaal and British businesses in the Transvaal, Bourke had positive personal relations with prominent members of both the Transvaal and the British. Paul Kruger thus advised Bourke, for their safety, Bourke should to take his family and leave for England for the duration of the war. Bourke and his family thus left the Transvaal for England in October 1899. During the war, Barton Keep was commandeered as staff headquarters for Lord Kitchener and Lord Milner. After the war, Eddie Bourke returned to Pretoria to resume an active part in its affairs. Eddie Bourke was elected as the first Mayor of Pretoria in 1903 where he served until 1904. He was succeeded by Andrew Johnstone.

Eddie Bourke died in Pretoria on 30 August 1926 at the age of 74. His house, Barton keep, unfortunately deteriorated in the years following his death before being purchased from the Bourke Trust by the Nederduitsch Hervormde Kerk in June 1945. After slight restoration Barton Keep is being used by the Pretoria Conservatoire of Music.

Today, Bourke Street in Arcadia, Pretoria bears his name.

== Arms ==
Coat of arms of Eddie Bourke
Notes Granted by Sir Arthur Vicars, Ulster King of Arms, 20 April 1902. Crest On a wreath of the colours a cat-a-mountain Proper gorged with a collar engrailed Gules pendent therefrom an escutcheon Or charged with a cross of the second. Escutcheon Quarterly Or and Ermine a cross engrailed Gules in the first quarter a lion rampant and in the fourth a dexter hand couped at the wrist Sable. Motto A Cruce Satsus
