= Eleanore Bouw-Spies =

South African politician

Eleanore Bouw-Spies MP

Member of the National Assembly of South Africa
- Incumbent
- Assumed office 22 May 2019

Executive Mayor of the Knysna Local Municipality
- In office 15 August 2016 – 5 June 2018
- Preceded by: Georlene Wolmarans
- Succeeded by: Mark Willemse
- In office 2007–2011
- Preceded by: Doris Wakeford-Brown
- Succeeded by: Georlene Wolmarans

Personal details
- Born: Eleanore Rochelle Jacquelene Bouw; 9 July 1971 (age 55) Knysna, Cape Province, South Africa
- Party: Democratic Alliance (2014–present)
- Other political affiliations: African National Congress (Until 2014)
- Spouse: Rowan Spies
- Education: Knysna Secondary School
- Alma mater: University of the Western Cape
- Occupation: Member of Parliament
- Profession: Politician

Eleanore Rochelle Jacquelene Bouw-Spies (née Bouw; born 9 July 1971) is a South African politician who has been a Member of Parliament for the Democratic Alliance since 2019.

== Early life and education ==
Bouw-Spies was born in Knysna, at the time part of the Cape Province. She attended Rheenendal Primary School and later the Knysna Secondary School. She holds a BA Degree and a Higher Diploma in Education from the University of the Western Cape.

== Political career ==
A former member of the African National Congress, Bouw-Spies was elected to the Knysna Municipal Council in 2000. She was later appointed to the mayoral committee before being elected as deputy mayor of the municipality. In 2007, Bouw-Spies was elected mayor of the municipality, a position she held until the 2011 local government elections, when the Democratic Alliance won a majority of seats on the municipal council and DA councillor Georlene Wolmarans was voted in as mayor.

After the death of the DA councillor for ward 5, Magda Williams, in 2014, Bouw-Spies joined the DA and was selected as the party's candidate for the ensuing by-election. She won the by-election and was appointed speaker of the council following her swearing-in. After the 2016 municipal elections, Bouw-Spies returned as mayor of the municipality, replacing Wolmarans, who became speaker.

On 6 June 2018, Bouw-Spies was removed as mayor in a motion of no confidence after two DA councillors, Peter Myers and Mark Willemse, defied the caucus instruction to not participate in the motion and voted with the opposition to remove her as mayor. Willemse was then elected mayor. The DA provincial leader, Bonginkosi Madikizela, likened her removal to that of a coup d'état. In December 2018, she was elected speaker of the council of the Garden Route District Municipality.

=== De Swart Report ===
In September 2018, the Knysna Municipal Council decided to lay a criminal charge against Bouw-Spies following a recommendation made by the "De Swart Report" so that the allegations against her, could be investigated. The docket was investigated by the South African Police Services (SAPS) and later sent to the Director of Public Prosecutions for a final decision on whether or not to prosecute Bouw-Spies. The Director of Public Prosecutions declined to prosecute her. On 11 March 2019, captain RP van der Westhuizen, informed the then-acting municipal manager, Johnny Douglas, by e-mail that the case had been closed and that the charge was dropped. Bouw-Spies was only informed about the decision at the end of July 2020 after the Western Cape Minister of Local Government, Anton Bredell, requested that the municipality provide him with information relating to the case. The DA expressed concern about why the information was not disclosed to the municipal council or the public, but welcomed the decision to not prosecute Bouw-Spies.

== Parliamentary career ==
For the 8 May 2019 general election, Bouw-Spies was first on the DA's list of parliamentary candidates from the Western Cape. At the election, she won a seat in the National Assembly. She took her seat on 22 May, two weeks after the election.

On 5 June 2019, she was appointed to the Shadow Cabinet as Shadow Deputy Minister on the Auditor-General. She became a member of the Standing Committee on Auditor General later that month.

On 5 December 2020, Bouw-Spies was appointed Shadow Deputy Minister of Co-operative Governance and Traditional Affairs, succeeding Cilliers Brink, who became Shadow Minister of the portfolio.

Bouw-Spies was promoted to Shadow Minister of Co-operative Governance and Traditional Affairs on 21 April 2023, following Brink's election as Mayor of Tshwane.

Bouw-Spies was re-elected to the National Assembly in the 2024 general election.

== Personal life ==
Bouw-Spies is married to Rowan Spies, a DA councillor in the Garden Route District Municipality.
