= City of Tshwane Metropolitan Municipality =

Tshwane Stad Tshwane Metropolitaanse Munisipaliteit (Afrikaans) Pretoria
- Metropolitan municipality
- City of Tshwane Metropolitan Municipality
- Seal

- Location in Gauteng
- Coordinates: 25°40′S 28°20′E
- Country: South Africa
- Province: Gauteng
- Seat: Pretoria
- Wards: 107

Government
  - Type: Municipal council
  - Mayor: Nasiphi Moya (ActionSA)
  - Deputy Mayor: Eugene Modise (ANC)

Area
  - Total: 6,298 km^{2} (2,432 sq mi)

Population (2022)
  - Total: 4,040,315

Racial makeup (2022)
  - Black African: 82.8%
  - Coloured: 1.8%
  - Indian/Asian: 1.7%
  - White: 13.4%

First languages (2011)
  - Sepedi: 28.4%
  - Afrikaans: 25.7%
  - Tswana: 24.7%
  - Tsonga: 11.7%
  - English: 10.4%
  - Other: 26.7%
- Time zone: UTC+2 (SAST)
- Municipal code: TSH
- Website: https://www.tshwane.gov.za/

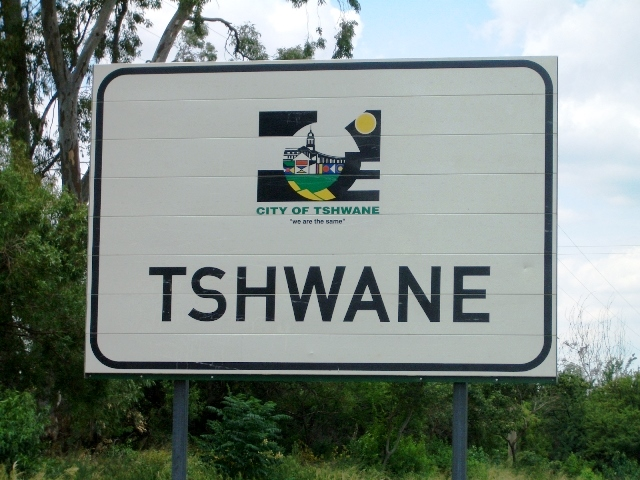
Tshwane sign, with the former logo depicting the Union Buildings in Pretoria, with slogan "We are the same" (photo 2005)

The City of Tshwane Metropolitan Municipality (Tsonga: Masipala wa Tshwane; Afrikaans: Stad Tshwane Metropolitaanse Munisipaliteit; Tswana: Mmasepala wa Toropokgolo ya Tshwane; Northern Sotho: Mmasepala wa Toropokgolo ya Tshwane), also known as the City of Tshwane (/tswɑːnɪ/), is the metropolitan municipality that forms the local government of northern Gauteng in South Africa. The metropolitan area is centred on the city of Pretoria with surrounding towns and localities included in the local government area.

== History ==
The City of Tshwane Metropolitan Municipality was established on 5 December 2000, comprising 13 former city and town councils and managed under an executive mayoral system.

The Metsweding District Municipality was incorporated into the municipality with effect from 18 May 2011 (the date of the 2011 municipal elections).

== Geography ==
The City of Tshwane Metropolitan Municipality's land area increased from 2,198 square kilometres (849 mi^{2}) in 2010 to 6,368 square kilometres (2,459 mi^{2}) after the incorporation of Metsweding. Since 3 August 2016 (the date of the 2016 municipal elections), the City of Tshwane has been the second largest metropolitan municipality by land area after Mangaung Metropolitan Municipality.

The Tswaing crater is in the northwest of Soshanguve.

=== Constituent areas ===
The City of Tshwane Metropolitan Municipality consists of the following areas:

- Akasia
- Atteridgeville
- Bronberg
- Bronkhorstspruit
- Centurion
- Crocodile River
- Cullinan/Rayton/Refilwe
- Eersterust
- Ekangala
- Elands River
- Ga-Rankuwa
- Hammanskraal
- Laudium
- Mabopane
- Mamelodi
- Olievenhoutbosch
- Pretoria
- Soshanguve
- Rethabiseng
- Roodeplaat
- Soshanguve
- Temba
- Winterveld
- Zithobeni

=== Main places ===
The 2011 census divided the municipality into the following main places:

Place	Code	Area (km^{2})	Area (sq mi)	Population	Most spoken language
Akasia	799037	80.84	31.21	59,455	Tswana 24% Afrikaans 23% Pedi 12% English 10%
Atteridgeville	799056	9.84	3.80	64,425	Pedi 41% Tswana 17% Sotho 12%
Baviaanspoort	799045	13.85	5.35	2,456	Afrikaans 32% Pedi 26%
Bon Accord	799036	15.85	6.12	2,270	Afrikaans 33% English 14% Pedi 13% Tsonga 11%
Boschkop	799067	29.28	11.31	623	Ndebele 25% Afrikaans 23%
Bronkhorstspruit	799072	34.00	13.13	12,470	Afrikaans 47% Ndebele 10% English 10%
Bultfontein	799013	92.48	35.71	2,147	Afrikaans 61%
Centurion	799059	394.88	152.46	236,580	Afrikaans 49% English 26%
Cullinan	799049	55.66	21.49	8,693	Afrikaans 49% Pedi 16%
Dilopye	799025	7.45	2.88	3,874	Tswana 58% Pedi 14% Tsonga 10%
Donkerhoek	799051	22.33	8.62	3,472	Pedi 28% Zulu 13% Afrikaans 12% Tsonga 12% Ndebele 11%
Eersterust	799047	6.05	2.34	29,676	Afrikaans 78% English 11%
Ekangala	799054	46.05	17.78	48,493	Zulu 33% Ndebele 29% Pedi 15%
Ga-Rankuwa	799034	52.18	20.15	90,945	Tswana 69%
Haakdoornboom	799020	101.60	39.23	4,309	Afrikaans 50%
Hammanskraal	799012	7.60	2.93	21,345	Tswana 46% Pedi 18% Tsonga 15%
Hebron	799033	1.02	0.39	2,321	Tswana 41% Pedi 17% Tsonga 15%
Kameeldrift	799043	32.76	12.65	6,727	Pedi 29% Afrikaans 28%
Kekana Garden	799010	2.61	1.01	15,709	Pedi 34% Tswana 31% Tsonga 13%
Kungwini Part 2	799065	8.60	3.32	8,738	Afrikaans 54% English 25%
Laudium	799058	6.07	2.34	19,102	English 77% Afrikaans 12%
Mabopane	799080	42.20	16.29	110,972	Tswana 59% Pedi 10%
Majaneng	799004	5.79	2.24	9,972	Tswana 31% Pedi 24% Tsonga 18%
Mamelodi	799046	45.19	17.45	334,577	Pedi 42% Zulu 12% Tsonga 11%
Mandela Village	799011	3.72	1.44	7,305	Tswana 28% Tsonga 22% Pedi 21%
Marokolong	799009	6.65	2.57	17,455	Tswana 29% Pedi 22% Tsonga 21%
Mashemong	799005	5.55	2.14	14,118	Tswana 36% Pedi 24% Tsonga 19%
Mooiplaas	799052	56.69	21.89	14,979	Pedi 25% non-official languages 20% Tsonga 14% Ndebele 10%
Nellmapius	799053	13.03	5.03	56,111	Pedi 35% Zulu 13%
Nuwe Eersterus	799023	23.64	9.13	35,059	Tswana 28% Pedi 22% Tsonga 22% Ndebele 10%
Olievenhoutbosch	799078	11.39	4.40	70,863	Pedi 33% Zulu 14%
Onverwacht	799028	1.24	0.48	1,518	Afrikaans 29% Pedi 29% Sotho 15%
Pretoria	799035	687.54	265.46	741,651	Afrikaans 48% English 16%
Ramotse	799002	6.00	2.32	15,760	Tswana 30% Pedi 22% Tsonga 19% Ndebele 11%
Rayton	799050	145.99	56.37	8,166	Afrikaans 59% Pedi 11%
Refilwe	799048	2.22	0.86	19757	Pedi 52% Zulu 10%
Rethabiseng	799055	1.75	0.681.75	10,964	Zulu 32% Ndebele 31% Pedi 13%
Roodepoort B	799062	24.33	9.39	1,915	Afrikaans 42%
Saulsville	799057	8.66	3.34	105,208	Pedi 45% Tsonga 15%
Soshanguve	799021	126.77	48.95	403,162	Pedi 28% Tswana 17% Tsonga 15% Zulu 14%
Soutpan	799022	12.75	4.92	2,157	Tsonga 29% Tswana 28% Pedi 17%
Stinkwater	799024	0.13	0.050	39,201	Tswana 33% Tsonga 24% Pedi 17%
Suurman	799007	126.77	48.95	11,071	Tswana 36% Tsonga 22% Pedi 21%
Temba	799008	21.81	8.42	58,431	Tswana 49% Pedi 16% Tsonga 12%
Thembisile	799038	1.98	0.76	1,809	Ndebele 70%
Tierpoort	799075	32.14	12.41	1,167	Afrikaans 50%
Tsebe	799032	4.34	1.68	2,702	Tswana 30% Ndebele 24% Zulu 11% Pedi 11% Tsonga 8%
Tshwane NU	799026	3,126.37	1,207.10	16,831	Ndebele 29% Afrikaans 23% Zulu 11% Pedi 10%
Vaalbank	799064	50.98	19.68	1,458	Afrikaans 38% Ndebele 21%
Waterval	799019	62.99	24.32	2,517	Afrikaans 46% Pedi 13%
Winterveld	799029	104.52	40.36	120,826	Tsonga 22% Tswana 20% Zulu 19% Pedi 12%
Zithobeni	799038	3.86	1.49	22,434	Ndebele 30% Zulu 28% Pedi 13%
Zwavelpoort	799066	37.50	14.48	1,148	Afrikaans 35%

== Demographics ==
There were around 2,921,500 (2011 census) people living within the borders of Tshwane: 75.40% black, 20.08% white, 2.01% coloured and 1.84% Indian or Asian.

=== Ethnic group 2011 census ===
Ethnic group	Population	%
Coloured	58 788	2.01%
Black African	2 202 847	75.40%
White	586 495	20.08%
Indian/Asian	53 744	1.84%
Other	19 614	0.67%
Total	2 921 488	100.00%

=== Ethnic group 2011 census (age 0–4) ===
Ethnic group	Population	%
Coloured	5 802	2.12%
Black African	225 111	82.20%
White	36 860	13.46%
Indian/Asian	4 280	1.56%
Other	1 814	0.66%
Total	273 867	100.00%

== Politics ==
The municipal council consists of 214 members elected by mixed-member proportional representation. 107 are elected by first-past-the-post voting in 107 wards, while the remaining 107 are chosen from party lists so that the total number of party representatives is proportional to the number of votes received. In the election of 4 November 2026, no party won a majority of seats on the council.

The following table shows the results of the 2026 election.

Party	Ward			List			Total seats
Party	Votes	%	Seats	Votes	%	Seats	Total seats
Democratic Alliance	311,175	34.71	37	304,519	34.03	37	74
ActionSA	184,884	20.62	26	210,443	23.52	22	48
African National Congress	181,405	20.24	44	180,863	20.21	0	44
Freedom Front Plus	69,206	7.72	0	67,440	7.54	17	17
Economic Freedom Fighters	53,260	5.94	0	50,088	5.60	13	13
uMkhonto weSizwe Party	18,959	2.11	0	16,173	1.81	4	4
South African Communist Party	12,151	1.36	0	9,130	1.02	3	3
Patriotic Alliance	6,425	0.72	0	5,258	0.59	2	2
Rise Mzansi	5,441	0.61	0	4,809	0.54	1	1
Security Personnel Party of South Africa	5,271	0.59	0	4,112	0.46	1	1
African Independent Congress	4,645	0.52	0	2,953	0.33	1	1
African Christian Democratic Party	2,173	0.24	0	3,568	0.40	1	1
Afrika Mayibuye Movement	2,990	0.33	0	2,517	0.28	1	1
Independent candidates	5,397	0.60	0				0
African Transformation Movement	1,767	0.20	0	3,020	0.34	1	1
Build One South Africa	2,242	0.25	0	1,763	0.20	1	1
Service Delivery Party	2,115	0.24	0	1,248	0.14	1	1
United Africans Transformation	1,162	0.13	0	2,125	0.24	1	1
62 other parties	25,806	2.88	0	24,771	2.77	0	0
Total	896,474	100.00	107	894,800	100.00	107	214
Valid votes	896,474	98.39		894,800	98.50		
Invalid/blank votes	14,665	1.61		13,672	1.50		
Total votes	911,139	100.00		908,472	100.00		
Registered voters/turnout	1,684,463	54.09		1,684,463	53.93		

=== The Executive ===
The political head of the municipality is the executive mayor. As of October 2024, Nasiphi Moya of ActionSA serves as mayor. The mayor appoints a mayoral committee to assist them with managing the municipality.

=== Mayors ===
(Post-apartheid mayors)

- Peter Maluleka,1994 - 1995 (ANC)
- Johannes Ramokhoase, 1995 - 2000 (ANC)
- Smangaliso Mkhatshwa, 2000 - 2006 (ANC)
- Gwen Ramokgopa, 2006 - 2010 (ANC)
- Kgosientso Ramokgopa, 2010 - 2016 (ANC)
- Solly Msimanga, 2016 - 2019 (DA)
- Stevens Mokgalapa, 2019 - 2020 (DA)
- Randall Williams, 2020 - 2023 (DA)
- Murunwa Makwarela, 2023 - 2023 (COPE)
- Cilliers Brink, 2023 - 2024 (DA)
- Nasiphi Moya, 2024–present (ActionSA)

== Services ==
=== Water and sanitation ===
As of 2016, City of Tshwane receives 72% of its bulk water from Rand Water, which utilizes the Integrated Vaal River System. The remaining 28% of Tshwane's water is sourced from its own treatment plants and boreholes. Water restrictions are implemented during drought, heat waves or other seasonal changes.

=== Transport ===
==== Railway ====
The main metrorail station is at the Pretoria railway station. The Gautrain runs through parts of the municipality, with stations in Centurion and Pretoria, ending at a station in the suburb of Hatfield.

==== Airports ====
O. R. Tambo International Airport in neighbouring Ekurhuleni Metropolitan Municipality serves Tshwane. Wonderboom Airport in Pretoria serves light aircraft.

=== Education ===
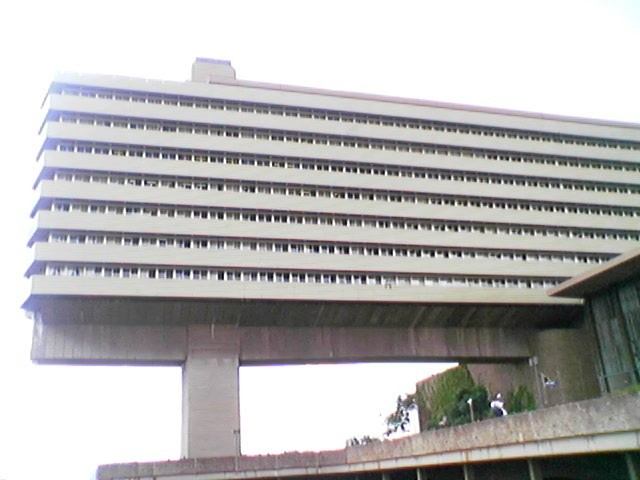
The front part of the Theo van Wyk Building on the Main Campus of UNISA

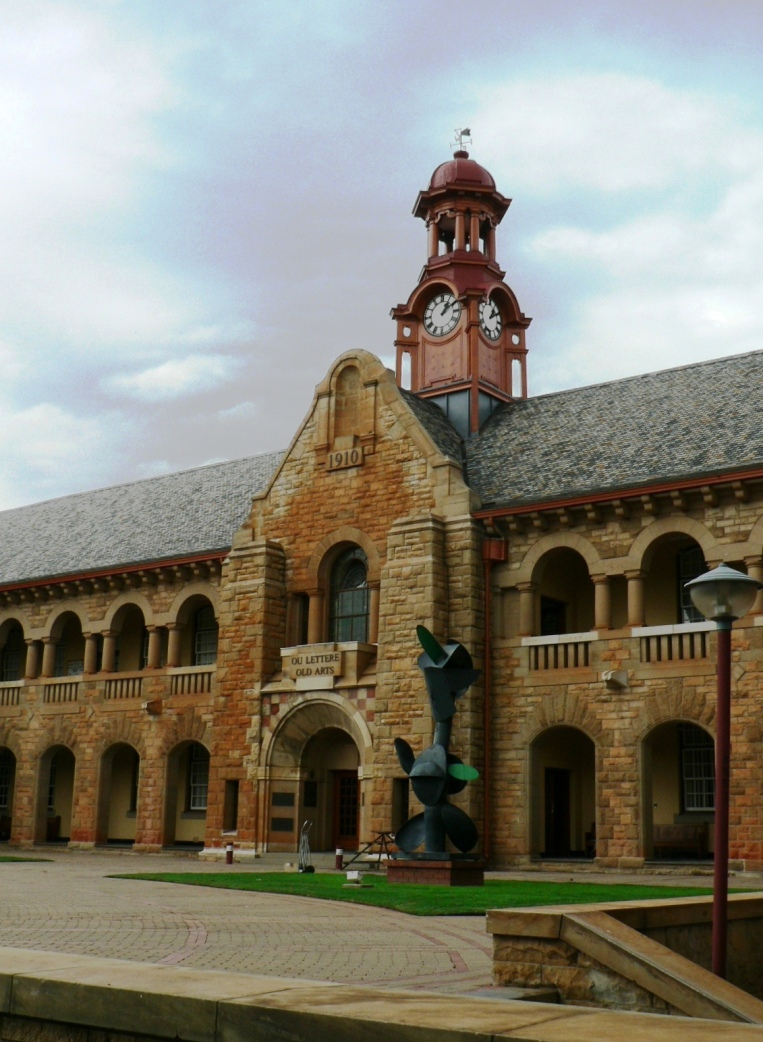
University of Pretoria's Old Arts Building

==== Tertiary education ====
The Tshwane municipality is home to the Tshwane University of Technology, and the largest distance education university (the University of South Africa, more commonly known by its acronym, UNISA), as well as The University of Pretoria, one of South Africa's leading research and teaching universities, Sefako Makgatho Health Sciences University (SMU, previously called University of Limpopo (Medunsa Campus) and Medical University of Southern Africa-MEDUNSA) a medical school, and the South African Council for Scientific and Industrial Research (CSIR).

== Military ==
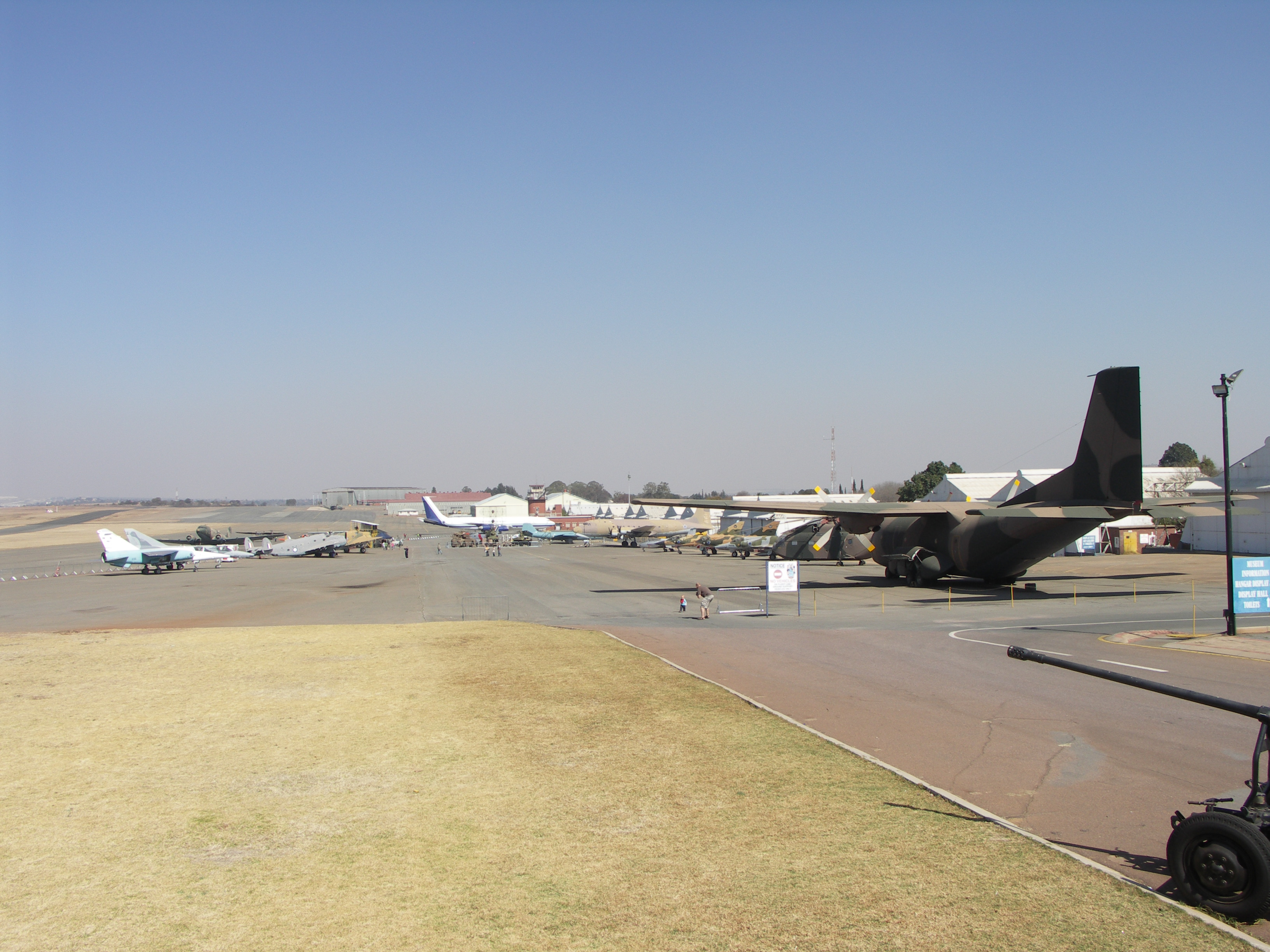
AFB Swartkop

=== Air Force ===
The South African Air Force military bases AFB Waterkloof and AFB Swartkop are in Centurion.

=== Thaba Tshwane Military Base ===
Thaba Tshwane military base (formerly called Voortrekkerhoogte and before that Roberts Heights) is in the municipality.

=== Memorials ===
The SANDF memorial is at Fort Klapperkop and the South African Air Force memorial is at AFB Swartkop.

== Society and culture ==
=== Museums ===
There are a large number of museums, many of them in Pretoria.

- Pretoria Forts
- Kruger House (residence of the president of the ZAR, Paul Kruger)
- Mapungubwe Collection
- Melrose House (the Treaty of Vereeniging which ended the Anglo-Boer War was signed here in 1902)
- Voortrekker Monument
- Freedom Park
- Transvaal Museum
- African Window
- South African Air Force Museum

=== Festivals ===
The city of Tshwane hosted the 10th World Choir Games, organised by the Interkultur Foundation, between 4–14 July 2018. Various locations across the city were used as venues to host concerts and ceremonies for the event, including the Musaion and Aula theatres at the University of Pretoria, the ZK Matthews Great Hall at the University of South Africa, and the Pretoria State Theatre. The event was the first of its kind on the African continent.

=== Sporting venues ===
- Lucas Moripe Stadium, Atteridgeville
- HM Pitje Stadium, Mamelodi
- Loftus Versfeld, Pretoria
- SuperSport Park, Centurion
- Odi Stadium, Mabopane
- Giant Stadium, Soshanguve

=== Scout Groups ===
- 1st Nan Hau Scout Group
- 5th Hillcrest/Colbyn Scout Group
- 6th St Andrews Scout Group
- 7th Mamelodi Scout Group
- 8th St Albans Scout Group
- 9th Irene Air Scout Group
- 10th Arcadia Scout Group
- 13th St Patricks Scout Group
- 14th Delp Scout Group
- 22nd Waterkloof / Kosmos Sea Scout Group
- 23rd Lyttleton Scout Group
- 35th Pretoria Sea Scout Group
- 36th Sinoville Scout Group
- 37th Springvale Scout Group
- 40th Glenstantia Scout Group
- 41st Parks Scout Group
- 42nd Laudium Scout Group
- 46th Midstream Scout Group

=== Sport ===
The city is home to the Tshwane Suns who compete in South Africa's highest basketball division, the Basketball National League. There are two Premier Soccer League teams, Mamelodi Sundowns and Supersport United. Pretoria University, known as Tuks plays in the second-tier league. Tshwane is also home to the Blue Bulls rugby team.

== Proposal for city name change ==
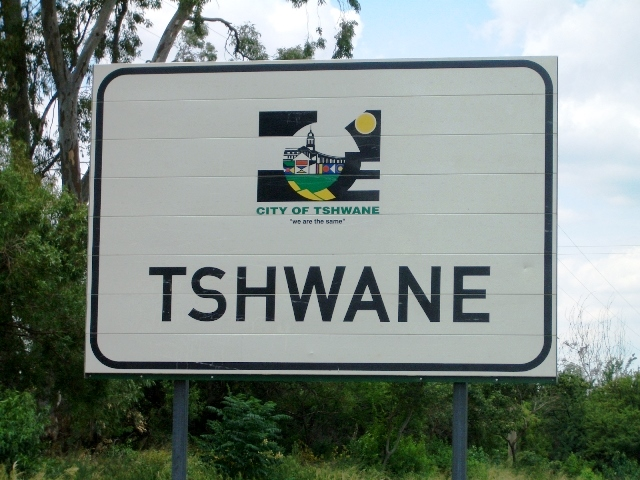
Logo of City of Tshwane depicting the Union Buildings in Pretoria, with slogan "We are the same"

Tshwane [tsʰwane] is the Setswana name of the Apies River, which flows through the city. The origin of the name of the river is unclear. It may mean "place -e of the black cow, tshwana, from ceremonies where a black cow was sprinkled with water from the river to end a drought.

Two other common explanations are demonstrably untrue. One is that it is the Tswana for the motto of Tshwane Municipality, "We are the same". However, this appears to be promoted only for its emotional value; if anything, it would mean "we are not the same" in Tswana (ga re tshwane). Another common misunderstanding is that it is the Tswana word for "little monkeys"; although "Tshwane" resembles tshwene (the Tswana word for baboon), baboons are not little and the words are not the same. "Little monkeys" is actually a translation of the Afrikaans name "Apies".

In 2005, politicians in the South African capital voted to rename the city Tshwane and retain the name Pretoria for the city centre only. The Sunday Times used the word Tshwane to refer to the Pretoria area for a short period in 2005. The state-controlled SABC also started using the term in its evening news broadcasts, for a period, but by 2010, had reverted to "Pretoria". Private media outlets continued to refer to the metropolitan area as Pretoria. The Pretoria News, the main newspaper in the metropolitan area did not appear to have plans to change its name as of early 2006, although it has adopted the slogan "The paper for the people of Tshwane".

On 21 May 2005, the Pretoria Civil Action Committee, a group consisting of business, labour, cultural, civil and political leaders opposed to the name change organised a protest in the Pretoria city centre. They marched to the office of Arts and Culture Minister Pallo Jordan and handed him a petition signed by 3,000 University of Pretoria students as well as other petition documents. Former president FW De Klerk, a Nobel prize winner and the last president under apartheid, also raised concerns about the change.

In November 2005, the Advertising Standards Authority found that advertising proclaiming that Tshwane, rather than Pretoria, was the capital of South Africa was misleading.

=== Proposed renaming of Pretoria ===
On 5 December 2000, a number of former Pretoria municipalities, as well as others that fell outside the Greater Pretoria area, were combined into one area called the City of Tshwane Metropolitan Municipality. The city of Pretoria remained largely intact in this municipality. On 26 May 2005, the South African Geographical Names Council unanimously approved a recommendation by the Tshwane Metro Council that the name Pretoria be changed to Tshwane, but approval from the Geographical Names Council is only a preliminary step in the process.

The legal process involved is as follows:

1. Recommendation to the Geographical Names Council.
2. Council approves/rejects recommendation (approved 26 May 2005).
3. Council gives its recommendation to the Arts and Culture Minister.
4. Minister approves/rejects recommendation.
5. Approved/rejected name is published in the Government Gazette.
6. Any person or body unhappy with the name change can complain within one month of above.
7. The minister can consult the Geographical Names Council with concerns raised.
8. The minister's decision, along with the reasons for it, are published
9. The minister will then take the matter before parliament where the central government will decide on whether to change the name or not based on the information before it.

Some groups attached themselves to the Pretoria name change issue, including the trade union Solidarity, which, along with the Pretoria Civil Action Committee, threatened legal action should the name change be recommended by the minister. In early August 2007, it was reported in the press that the municipality, after consulting with the Gauteng provincial government had withdrawn the application to change the name, and was instead contemplating a plan to change all road signs pointing to "Pretoria" to "Tshwane" or the "City of Tshwane" across the country. This plan raised threats of legal action from both political groupings opposed to the renaming, and concerns from municipal officials about the possibility of vandalism to the proposed signs.

In 2010, the Ministry of Arts and Culture prepared to publish the registration of Tshwane as a place name, in the Government Gazette. However, the registration was withdrawn at the last minute, which was explained by the minister. Although it was too late to remove the name from printing in the Government Gazette, the retraction of the name registration was published the following week in the gazette. In November 2011, Kgosientso Ramokgopa, who had been elected mayor earlier that year, vowed to push forward with the renaming in 2012.

== Management and corruption ==
As in other parts of the country, the Tshwane Metropolitan Municipality experiences high levels of corruption. Significant resources of the Special Investigation Unit (SIU) were dedicated to this region since 2010. The screening of applicants for management positions has also been criticized.

When, by November 2020, businesses and residents owed the metro R12 billion, the metro outsourced its credit management to 34 debt collecting agencies after normal means were ineffectual. This was expected to increase the metro's income levels, cash flow and capacity for service delivery. In 2021, its debt with Eskom stood at over R200 million, and the utility labeled it as a municipality with a poor payment record. When in August 2022 its debt stood at R1.152 billion, Eskom warned that the city's electricity may be disconnected.

In February 2022, its debtors book stood at R17 billion and Tshwane implemented the Tshwane Yatima project to disconnect the power and/or water supply to 420 businesses, besides that of some state departments (Public Works and Infrastructure owing R355 million) and embassies, SARS, the Navy and SAPS headquarters and Hatfield Gautrain station due to non-payment of their electricity or municipal accounts. The University of Pretoria paid the bill of its Hillcrest campus under protest at the last minute.

== See also ==
- Pretoria
- Media in Pretoria
- Rainbow Junction
