= Cilliers Brink =

South African politician

Alderman Cilliers Brink
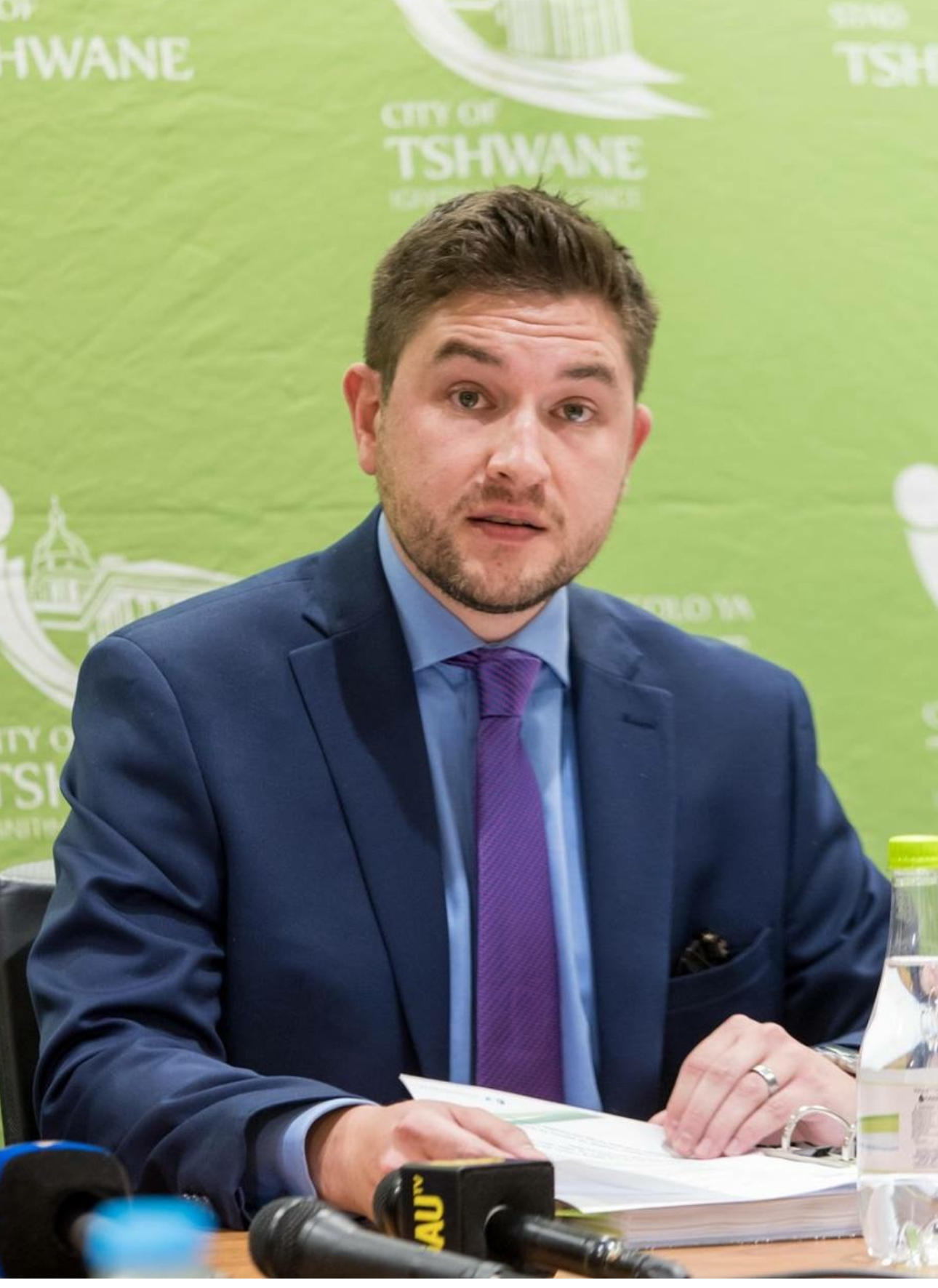

Deputy Federal Chairperson of the Democratic Alliance
- Incumbent
- Assumed office 12 April 2026 Serving with Siviwe Gwarube and Solly Malatsi
- Leader: Geordin Hill-Lewis

Mayor of Tshwane
- In office 28 March 2023 – 26 September 2024
- Preceded by: Murunwa Makwarela
- Succeeded by: Nasiphi Moya

Member of the Tshwane City Council
- Incumbent
- Assumed office 24 February 2023
- In office May 2011 – May 2019

National Spokesperson of the Democratic Alliance
- In office September 2022 – February 2023 Serving with Solly Malatsi (18 August 2022 – 2 April 2023)
- Leader: John Steenhuisen
- Preceded by: Siviwe Gwarube
- Succeeded by: Solly Malatsi (solely)

Shadow Minister of Cooperative Governance and Traditional Affairs
- In office 5 December 2020 – 23 February 2023
- Deputy: Eleanore Bouw-Spies
- Leader: John Steenhuisen
- Preceded by: Haniff Hoosen

Member of the National Assembly of South Africa
- In office 22 May 2019 – 23 February 2023

Shadow Deputy Minister of Cooperative Governance and Traditional Affairs
- In office 5 June 2019 – 5 December 2020
- Leader: John Steenhuisen; Mmusi Maimane
- Shadow Minister: Haniff Hoosen
- Preceded by: Choloane Matsepe
- Succeeded by: Eleanore Bouw-Spies

Member of the Mayoral Committee of Tshwane for Corporate and Shared Services
- In office August 2016 – May 2019
- Mayor: Solly Msimanga

Personal details
- Born: 12 June 1987 (age 39) Springs, Transvaal Province, South Africa
- Party: Democratic Alliance
- Education: University of Pretoria (LLB)
- Occupation: Politician; legislator
- Profession: Lawyer

Cilliers Brink (born 12 June 1987) is a South African politician who was Mayor of Tshwane from 28 March 2023 until 26 September 2024. A member of the Democratic Alliance, he has served as a deputy federal chairperson of the party since April 2026.

He was the party's Shadow Minister of Cooperative Governance and Traditional Affairs from 2020 until 2023 and a Member of Parliament (MP) from 2019 to 2023. He was also the party's Shadow Deputy Minister of Cooperative Governance and Traditional Affairs between 2019 and 2020.

Brink was elected a DA councillor in Tshwane in 2011 and served as a member of the mayoral committee (MMC) between 2016 and 2019.

== Early life and education ==
Brink was born on 12 June 1987 in Springs in South Africa's then-Transvaal Province. His family moved to Phalaborwa where he grew up. He matriculated from Kingfisher Private School in 2005 and enrolled for a Bachelor of Laws at the University of Pretoria the following year. He graduated with an LLB degree in 2012 and later received his Practical Legal Training Certificate from the LSSA Practical Law School in 2013.

== Political career ==
Brink has had an interest in politics since a young age. While at university, Brink joined the Democratic Alliance Student Organisation on campus in 2009. He was elected chairperson of the DA Youth in Tshwane in 2010. He was elected to the Tshwane city council as a member of the Democratic Alliance in 2011. After the 2016 municipal elections, the DA gained control of Tshwane and Brink was appointed as the member of the mayoral committee for corporate and shared services, becoming the first DA politician to hold the post.

== Parliamentary career ==
Prior to the 2019 South African general election held on 8 May, the DA revealed their candidate lists. Brink was placed tenth on the party's Gauteng list of National Assembly candidates, thirty-third on the party's national candidate list for the National Assembly and sixty-seventh on the party's provincial list for the provincial legislature. He was elected to the National Assembly on the party's national list. Brink was sworn into office on 22 May 2019.

On 5 June 2019, he was appointed Shadow Deputy Minister of Cooperative Governance and Traditional Affairs. Brink became a member of the Portfolio Committee on Cooperative Governance and Traditional Affairs on 27 June 2019.

In June 2020, Brink criticised the national Minister of Cooperative Governance and Traditional Affairs, Dr. Nkosazana Dlamini-Zuma, for saying that municipalities should appoint "the right cadres for the job". He went on to claim that cadre deployment is responsible for the decline of municipalities and that cadre deployment should be abolished.

On 5 December 2020, he was appointed as Shadow Minister for the portfolio, succeeding Haniff Hoosen, in the Shadow Cabinet of John Steenhuisen.

== Mayor of Tshwane ==
Tshwane mayor and DA member Randall Williams announced his resignation as mayor on 13 February 2023. Brink and seven other DA members were interviewed for the position; he was announced as the DA's candidate on 21 February 2023 and his candidacy was endorsed by the members of the multi-party coalition which holds a majority of seats on the Tshwane city council.

He became a councillor on 23 February 2023 after councillor Sean Cox resigned to make way for him to be sworn in. During the council meeting on 28 February 2023, Brink lost to council speaker and COPE's lone councillor, Dr Murunwa Makwarela in the election for mayor. Brink received only 101 votes compared to Makwarela's 112.

Makwarela was soon removed from office for being an unrehabilitated insolvent on 7 March 2023, but was reinstated on 9 March after he produced a certificate of solvency rehabilitation, which was found to have been forged. He then resigned from office and council the following day. Rogue councillors in the multi-party coalition who voted for Makwarela over Brink also faced repercussions and were expelled.

Brink was elected as mayor during a council meeting on 28 March 2023 with the help of the multi-party coalition. He defeated COPE's new councillor Ofentse Moalusi, winning with 109 votes to Moalusi's 102 votes.

After a vote of no confidence by the ANC on 26 September 2024, Brink was removed as mayor ANC Tshwane regional secretary George Matjila led efforts to remove Mayor Cilliers Brink. He used the ANC's role in the multiparty coalition to gather backing for a no-confidence motion. He pointed to governance failures and irregular appointments during Brink's leadership of the DA.

On 15 August 2025, Brink was announced as the DA's mayoral candidate for Tshwane for the 2026 local government elections.

== Deputy Federal Chairperson of the DA ==
In March 2026, Brink announced that he was a candidate for one of the DA's three Deputy Federal Chairperson positions, ahead of the party's Federal Congress in April. He was elected on 12 April 2026, alongside Siviwe Gwarube and Solly Malatsi.
