= Mark Willemse =

South African politician (b. 1964)

Deputy Mayor of the Knysna Local Municipality
- Incumbent
- Assumed office 22 November 2021
- Preceded by: Aubrey Tswengwa

Executive Mayor of the Knysna Local Municipality
- In office 6 June 2018 – March 2020
- Deputy: Aubrey Tsengwa (2019–2020); Ricky van Aswegen (2018–2019)
- Preceded by: Eleanore Bouw-Spies
- Succeeded by: Aubrey Tsengwa (acting); Ricky van Aswegen

Personal details
- Born: 26 August 1964 (age 61) Cape Town, South Africa
- Party: Knysna Independent Movement (2021–present)
- Other political affiliations: Democratic Alliance (2014–2019)
- Spouse: Dalene Willemse (m. 1990)
- Children: 3
- Occupation: Politician

Mark Willemse (born 26 August 1964) is a South African politician serving as the Deputy Mayor of the Knysna Local Municipality since 2021. He is the former Executive Mayor of Knysna, and former Ward Councillor for Ward 9. Having taken office in June 2018 after voting with the ANC to unseat Mayor Eleanore Bouw-Spies, he lost the confidence of his caucus and was dismissed in October 2019. His application to court to overturn his dismissal was dismissed, with costs, in March 2020. Willemse was previously Speaker of the Eden District Municipality.

== Early life and career ==
Mark Sydney Willemse was born on 26 August 1964 in Cape Town. Willemse matriculated from the Oude Molen Technical School in 1982. He has four years of military service. He later married Dalene in 1990, and they have three children together. He obtained diplomas in Business and Marketing from the Wits Business School. He achieved a Diploma in Transport Economics from the Rand Afrikaans University.

Willemse has been involved in junior sports development and school feeding schemes in Knysna. He has served on the boards of the Knysna Sports Development Trust, Epilepsy Knysna and Sinethemba. He regularly volunteered with the E’pap Feeding Scheme.

== Political career ==
Willemse joined the Democratic Alliance in 2014. He was subsequently appointed Constituency Officer of the party's Knysna office.

In May 2015, he was announced as the party's ward 9 councillor candidate for the by-election, that took place in the ward on Wednesday, 22 July 2015. He won the election with 68.98% of the vote.

In May 2016, he was appointed as the Mayoral Committee Member for Community Services. In August 2016, he was re-elected as a ward councillor and was also elected Speaker of the Eden District Council. He later resigned as Speaker in May 2017, but he was appointed to the post again the following month.

== Mayoralty ==
On 6 June 2018, he voted with the ANC to remove incumbent Executive Mayor Bouw-Spies in a vote of no confidence, tabled by the opposition African National Congress. The vote was eleven to one against Bouw-Spies. Willemse and Peter Myers were the only DA councillors who participated in the vote. The ANC did not propose an alternative candidate. Willemse, after nomination by Peter Myers, became the Executive Mayor with COPE councillor, Ricky van Aswegen, as his Deputy Mayor. This move generated criticism from the provincial DA leadership structure. Provincial Leader Bonginkosi Madikizela compared the removal of Bouw-Spies to that of a "coup d'état" and called on Willemse to resign immediately. Willemse refused to step down as Mayor and tendered his resignation as Speaker of the Eden District Council, effective 11 June 2018. The party then consequently held disciplinary hearings and found Willemse guilty of misconduct. Willemse appealed against the findings. Willemse's appeal was upheld by the DA Federal Legal Commission and he was therefore found not guilty of any breach of the DA Constitution.

On 31 May 2019, Willemse survived a vote of no confidence that was tabled by a municipal Democratic Alliance councillor, Michelle Wasserman. Twelve councillors voted against the no-confidence motion, while seven voted for it. There was one spoilt ballot. The Democratic Alliance Speaker of the Knysna Council, Georlene Wolmarans, was removed in an ANC-sponsored motion. The following day, 1 June, the Democratic Alliance Provincial Leader Bonginkosi Madikizela said that the party no longer recognises Willemse as a party member and that the DA is now the opposition in the municipality.

In September 2019, Willemse's caucus passed a motion of no confidence in him as Mayor. When he refused to step down, his membership was terminated. Upon his membership termination, Willemse said, “I'm bitterly disappointed in the outcome. It is mine and my legal team's contestation that I'm still a member of the DA." Willemse approached the Western Cape High Court which dismissed his application, with costs. Since Willemse's party membership was terminated, a by-election was scheduled to take place in his ward. The court agreed to suspend the vacancy until it heard Part B of his application to the court (arguing that the DA's so-called recall clause is unconstitutional). In the interim, the court refused his application to be returned as Councillor, and therefore Mayor. Following the Court's dismissal of his application, a by-election was declared by the Independent Electoral Commission. He lost his appeal in March 2020.

== Post-mayoral career ==
The by-election was delayed for an extended period following the outbreak of the COVID-19 pandemic and subsequent lockdown. Willemse contested the by-election in ward 9 as an independent candidate on 11 November 2020. He lost to Sharon Sabbagh, a former DA Johannesburg city councillor, who won 76.06% of the vote.

Willemse stood as the Knysna Independent Movement's candidate for Mayor of the Knysna Municipality and candidate for Ward 10 in the 2021 municipal elections. He was elected back to council as one of two KIM PR councillors. After KIM and the DA formed a coalition, Willemse was elected deputy mayor of the municipality on 22 November 2021.
