= Murunwa Makwarela =

South African politician and businessman (1972–2024)

Mayor of Tshwane
- In office 28 February 2023 – 10 March 2023; Removed from office: 7–9 March 2023
- Preceded by: Randall Williams
- Succeeded by: Cilliers Brink

Speaker of the Tshwane City Council
- In office 20 January 2022 – 28 February 2023
- Preceded by: Katlego Mathebe
- Succeeded by: Mncedi Ndzwanana

Personal details
- Born: 1972 Cullinan, Pretoria, Transvaal, South Africa
- Died: 23 April 2024 (aged 51) South Africa
- Party: Congress of the People (Until 2023)
- Education: University of Venda (BSc); University of Natal (BScHons, MSc); University of the Witwatersrand (PhD)

Murunwa Makwarela (1972 – 23 April 2024) was a South African politician, genetic engineer, academic and businessman who served as the Mayor of Tshwane, from 28 February 2023 until he was fired by the city manager on 7 March 2023 for being declared insolvent in 2016. Makwarela was reinstated on 9 March 2023 before resigning on 10 March 2023 after it was found that the rehabilitation certificate he produced to be reinstated, was fraudulent. A former member of the Congress of the People, he served as the party's lone councillor in the municipality. Prior to his election as mayor, he was the council speaker, serving as part of a multi-party coalition led by the Democratic Alliance and other parties.

== Early life and education ==
Makwarela was born in 1972 in Cullinan outside Pretoria in the then-Transvaal Province of South Africa. He grew up in the village of Tshitereke in the Venda bantustan. Makwarela graduated from the University of Venda in 1994 with a Bachelor of Science in Botany and Zoology. He subsequently studied at the University of Natal's Durban campus from which he obtained an honours degree in Plant Biotechnology in 1995 followed by a Master of Science in Eucalyptus cold tolerance and tissue culture in 1997. He received his doctorate from University of the Witwatersrand in 2006. While completing his doctorate, he did his research at the Donald Danforth Plant Science Institute in Missouri in the United States.

== Career ==
Makwarela started his career at the University of the Witwatersrand where he worked as a researcher cassava genetic engineering between 2000 and 2005. From 2005 to 2007, he was the first Divisional Head: Gene Banks at the Agricultural Research Council. Makwarela then found employment at the City of Tshwane as the strategic executive director of the municipality's Agriculture and Environmental Management Department between 2007 and 2012. He then proceeded to work for the TAHAL Group as the chief executive officer of the company's South African branch, TAHAL South Africa between 2012 and 2014.

Makwarela also served as a non-executive director and as board chairperson of the Biofuel Business Incubator from 2014 to 2019. He was a non-executive director at the SA Essential Oil Business Incubator as well. He served as a non-executive director at the Johannesburg Development Agency as chairperson of the HRREMCO committee from 2020 to 2021 and as a non-executive director at the Johannesburg Market from 2021 to 2022. He was also a co-founder of and chairperson of the Maluti Green Med, a cannabis-licensed pharmaceutical company, based in Lesotho.

== Political career ==
Makwarela was appointed regional chairperson of the Congress of the People in Tshwane in 2020. He was elected as the party's lone proportional representation councillor in the City of Tshwane in the November 2021 local government elections.

=== Tshwane council speaker ===
Makwarela was elected speaker of the Tshwane City Council on 20 January 2022 as part of a coalition agreement COPE signed with the Democratic Alliance, ActionSA, the African Christian Democratic Party, the Inkatha Freedom Party, and the Freedom Front Plus to form a majority government in the council. In April 2022, the African National Congress and the Economic Freedom Fighters called for him to resign as council speaker amid allegations of graft and sexual assault levelled against him, which he responded to by saying: It"s all lies. As things stand, it's premature for me to resign. The ANC wants to use these untested allegations as a political plot and to be a law unto themselves."

On 17 November 2022, Makwerela opened a criminal case at the Brooklyn Police Station after he was allegedly assaulted by ANC councillors during a council meeting two days earlier.

On 13 February 2023, Randall Williams announced his resignation as Tshwane mayor, however, he soon after amended it, changing the date of his resignation to 28 February 2023, which caused confusion amongst councillors. Makwarela's office sought legal advice and Makwarela announced on 21 February 2023 that Williams' first resignation letter was valid and his second one not, which meant that the metro was now without a mayor. The DA, as per the coalition agreement signed between the parties, nominated MP Cilliers Brink as their candidate whom Makwarela initially pledged to support. COPE was soon removed from the coalition after Makwarela refused to schedule an urgent council meeting to elect a new mayor.

== Mayor of Tshwane ==
During a council meeting on 28 February 2023, Makwarela was nominated for the position of mayor by the African Transformation Movement with the support of the EFF and ANC. Makwarela defeated Brink in the mayoral vote which saw a majority of 112 councillors voting for him and only 101 councillors voting for Brink. It is suspected that some of the DA's coalition partners voted for Makwarela.

=== Removal from office ===
On 7 March 2023, Makwarela was found to have violated Section 47(1)(c) of the Constitution, (which states people who are “unrehabilitated insolvents” cannot hold public office) after being found to have been declared insolvent in 2016. As a result, he was disqualified from being a PR council member of the Tshwane City Council, effectively stripping him off his mayoralty. City manager Johann Mettler's office served Makwarela with a notice to prove he has since been rehabilitated, but he failed to provide any evidence. He was reinstated as a councillor and mayor two days later after he provided a certificate of solvency rehabilitation, which legitimacy subsequently came under scrutiny. The following day, the Gauteng High Court in Pretoria issued a statement, in which they said that the rehabilitation certificate Makwarela provided to the municipality was forged and that the court has never issued such a certificate to Makwarela. He then resigned as mayor and a councillor on the same day. It was also reported that he was no longer a member of COPE. Brink was elected to succeed him as mayor on 28 March 2023.

== Death ==
Makwarela died from a short illness on 23 April 2024, at the age of 51.
