= Buffelsbaai =

Buffels Bay Buffelsbaai
- Village
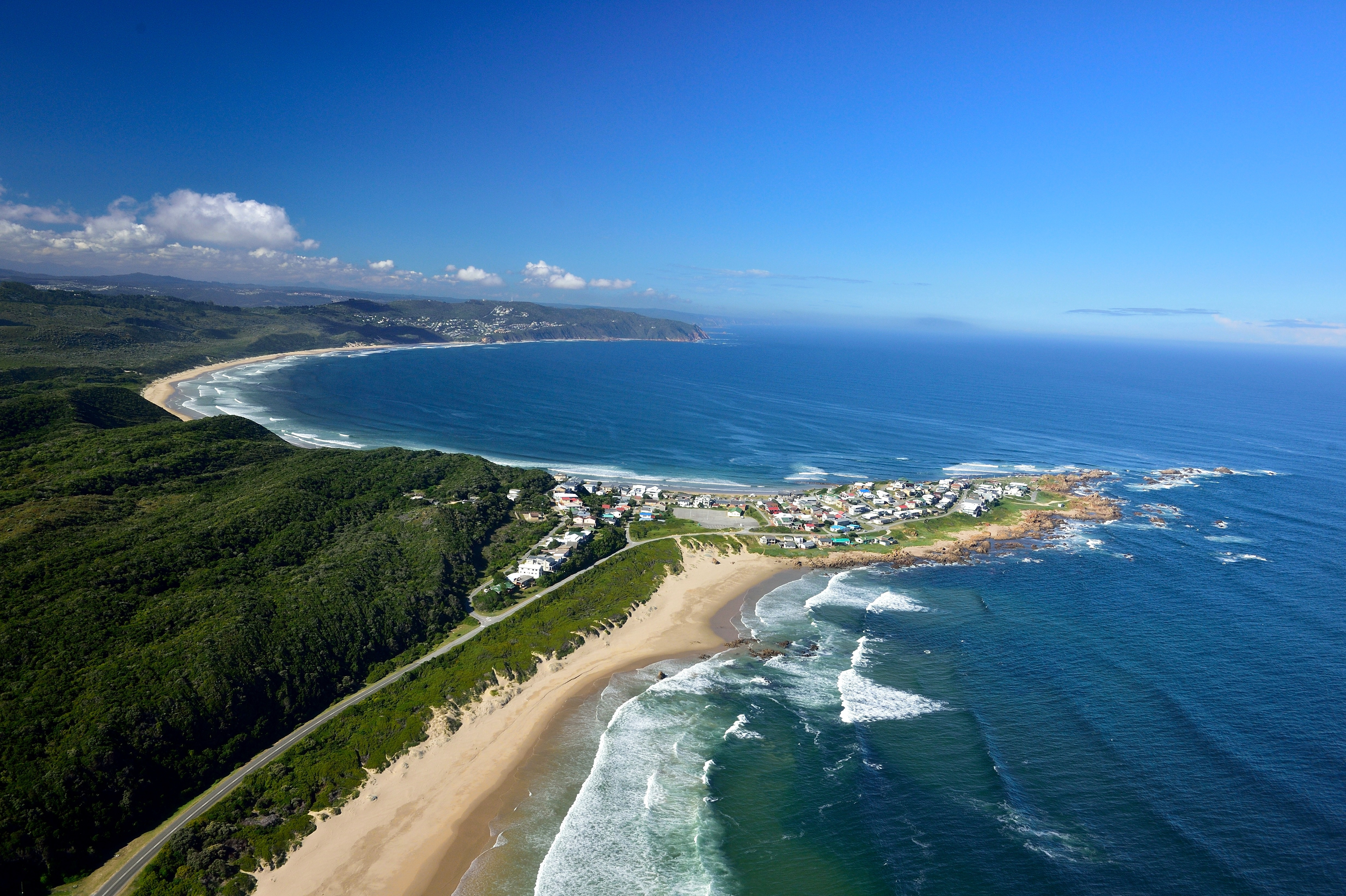
- Buffelsbaai from the air

- Location within Western Cape Location within South Africa
- Coordinates: 34°05′S 22°58′E
- Country: South Africa
- Province: Western Cape
- District: Garden Route
- Municipality: Knysna
- Ward: 5

Government
  - Councillor: Hilton Stroebe

Area
  - Total: 0.82 km^{2} (0.32 sq mi)

Population (2011)
  - Total: 71
  - Density: 87/km^{2} (220/sq mi)

Racial makeup (2011)
  - Black African: 1.4%
  - Coloured: 71.8%
  - White: 26.8%

First languages (2011)
  - Afrikaans: 100.0%
- Time zone: UTC+2 (SAST)
- Website: www.buffelsbaai.co.za

Buffelsbaai (also Buffels Bay and Buffalo Bay) is a small seaside village 15 kilometres from Knysna in the Garden Route District Municipality in the Western Cape province of South Africa.

The village is named after Buffelsbaai which stretches east of the village. It is a popular vacation destination with a small waterfront with stores.

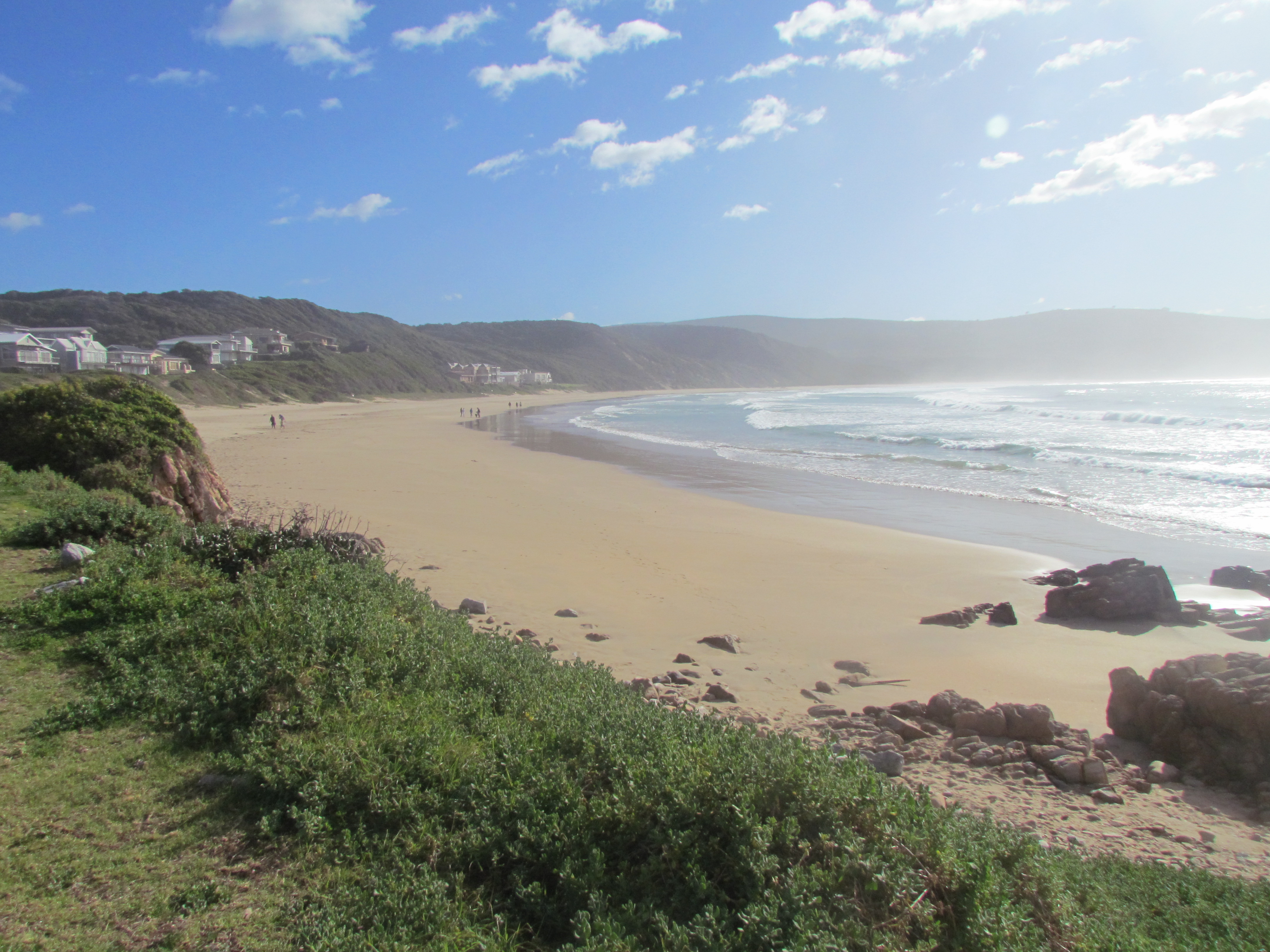
Buffelsbaai Beach

== History ==
=== The Early Inhabitants ===
The area around Buffelsbaai was home to the Khoi and San people for thousands of years before the arrival of European settlers. These indigenous people were hunters and gatherers who lived off the land, and their way of life was closely tied to the seasons and the weather. They had a rich culture, with their own languages, traditions, and beliefs.

=== The Early Settlers ===
In the 1700s, the Dutch East India Company established a trading post in the nearby town of Mossel Bay, which marked the beginning of European settlement in the area. The Dutch farmers, known as Boers, began to migrate inland from the coast and establish farms in the region. They were followed by British settlers, who arrived in the 1800s and established trading posts in the area.

Buffelsbaai was initially established as a farming community, with many of the early settlers working as farmers and ranchers. The area was particularly well-suited for cattle farming, and many of the early farms focused on producing beef, dairy products, and wool. The town grew slowly over the years, and by the turn of the 20th century, it was a small, self-sufficient community.

== Incidents ==
The cargo ship Kiani Satu, travelling from Hong Kong to Ghana with a shipment of rice, ran aground and sank off the coast of the town in August 2013. Leaked oil from the vessel threatened the nearby Goukamma Nature Reserve; 217 birds were cleaned by SANCCOB after the spill.
