= Eersterust =

Eersterust Poort
- Location within Gauteng Location within South Africa Location within Africa
- Coordinates: 25°42′25″S 28°18′33″E
- Country: South Africa
- Province: Gauteng
- Municipality: City of Tshwane
- Main Place: Pretoria

Government
  - Councillor: Manny Hugo (DA)

Area
  - Total: 6.05 km^{2} (2.34 sq mi)

Population (2011)
  - Total: 29,676
  - Density: 4,910/km^{2} (12,700/sq mi)

Racial makeup (2011)
  - Black African: 14.4%
  - Coloured: 83.5%
  - Indian/Asian: 1.0%
  - White: 0.2%
  - Other: 0.9%

First languages (2011)
  - Afrikaans: 77.5%
  - English: 10.5%
  - Northern Sotho: 2.7%
  - S. Ndebele: 2.0%
  - Other: 7.3%
- Time zone: UTC+2 (SAST)
- Postal code (street): 0022
- Area code: +27(0)12 - 806
- Website: www.eersterust.com

Eersterust or "First Rest," often incorrectly spelled "Eersterus," is a formal South African township within the City of Tshwane Metropolitan Municipality and is located just about 15 km east of the Pretoria city centre. It is also referred to by locals as "Poort." Eersterust is situated west of Mamelodi.

== Origins ==
The area was created by the government of the apartheid era, which allocated and relocated people of the Coloured race group to this area. It was laid out in 1962 on the farm Vlakfontein. The name of Eersterust is clouded in mystery. Some say it is named after the mail-coach route that went to Lydenburg during the gold rush—this being the first stop—while others speculate that it might have been the first township for coloured people established in the area.

== Overview ==
Eersterust is seen as the gateway to the industrial areas of Pretoria, like Silverton and Waltloo. Most of the residents work in these areas, not far from home. The township has an estimated 85,000 residents. This community has evolved to develop its own cultural history including unique traditions and a way of life, based on friendliness and hospitality. Restaurants offer a unique local flavour with a variety of choices available, from traditional tastes to the spicy and adventurous. The main language is Afrikaans but many others are spoken.

Eersterust is a very religious community, and there are numerous places of worship throughout the area. The first Catholic church which dates back to the early 1950s is located here. 70% of residents are Christian, while 30% belong to other religions, including Islam.

== Neighborhoods ==
Eersterust has six independent extensions (ext.1, ext.2, ext.3, ext.4, ext.5, and ext.6) which offer nearby schooling and transport routes. Newspapers and the media, however, generally refer to the parts of the township as North, East and West. Residents maintain neighborhood night watch groups to assist police in protecting against crime. Major streets of Eersterust include Hans Coverdale Road West, Hans Coverdale Road East and Hans Coverdale Road North; being long-distanced, they facilitate easy navigation around the area.

== Points of interest ==
Clubs and organisations

- Club Bel Air
- 7th Avenue - Blanco Centre
- Civic Centre
- YDO - Youth Development outreach organisation
- YMaD - Youth Making a Difference
- Jabula Destiny Ministries International
- Eersterust Minister's Fraternal (EMF)
- South African Creative Industries Incubator (SACII)
- Tshwane School of Music (TSOM)
- Poort FM 88.2 - Local community radio station
- ECDF - Eersterust Community Development Forum
- EYDM - Eersterust Youth Development Movement
- Eersterust Clinic
- Eersterust Library
- Athlectics Club Eersterust (ACE)

== History ==
More or less in 1905 the then-owner of a farm close to Pretoria where the township of Eersterust now resides, divided a portion of his property into plots to sell. The township was developed for Coloureds to stay there, but the plots were mainly bought by Black People (Van der Walt, 1966).

The details of the initial developments are not known. According to Van der Walt (1966) the living conditions were bad during the 1930s, there was no sanitation, illnesses were common and a lot of children died then. At that time Eersterust was no more than just a squatters settlement: the houses were mainly made of sink and mud and a lot more of those structures were built on the same premises. Crime skyrocketed then.

A portion of the farm (Derdepoort no.469) in Pretoria was proclaimed a Coloured area in 1958. The area was once again divided into plots after the previous owners were expropriated from the area. After the non-coloureds were relocated to another area the houses were destroyed and new ones were built. The first housing scheme consisting of 200 houses was completed during February 1962 and consisted of six economical residences. At that point in time 5 were made to move Coloureds that were staying somewhere else in Pretoria, such as Lady Selborne, Eastwood, Claremont, Booysens and the so-called Kaapse Lokasie, into Eersterust.

In 1979 there was a total of 17,000 people living in Eersterust.

Further development took place, and a total of 1207 sub-economical houses, 956 economical houses, and more or less 86 private houses were built in Eersterust.

=== The name Eersterust ===
The existence of the name is not precisely known, but according to Van der Wald (1966) there are three possibilities: 1. The then-owner that was involved in dividing the farm into plots, his daughter said that her father was an idealist and with the development of the township wanted to create the first resting in Transvaal for descendants of slaves. 2. Amongst the residence of Eersterust is said that the township was the first resting outside of Pretoria where the postman at the end of the previous century could rest after his trip between Lydenburg and Pretoria hence the name Eerste Rust. (The name is in Afrikaans.) 3. Some of the residence said that the Republican forces that came with the British during the three years of War out of Pretoria stopped at Eersterust, rested before they continued their struggle.

=== Housing in Eersterust ===
There are three types of accommodation units found in Eersterust, sub-economical units, economical units and private units. There are three sub-economical units that consist of two-, three- and four-room houses. The two- and three-room sub-economical houses are linked together and have a combination sitting room / dining room / kitchen, no ceiling, built in electricity points, warm water inside the house, a bathroom, a toilet inside the house and were built on small stands.
