= Nasiphi Moya =

South African politician

Alderwoman Nasiphi Moya

Mayor of Tshwane
- Incumbent
- Assumed office October 2024
- Deputy: Eugene Modise
- Preceded by: Cilliers Brink

Member of the Tshwane City Council
- Incumbent
- Assumed office January 2024

Deputy Mayor of Tshwane
- In office January 2024 – October 2024
- Leader: Cilliers Brink
- Preceded by: (Inaugural holder)
- Succeeded by: Eugene Modise

Personal details
- Born: 6 February 1988 (age 38) Mpikwana, Eastern Cape
- Party: ActionSA
- Education: University of Cape Town, University of the Western Cape
- Occupation: Politician; legislator

Hazel Nasiphi Moya is a South African public servant serving as the Executive Mayor of the City of Tshwane since 9 October 2024. She was born in Mpikwana, Eastern Cape. She is a member of ActionSA.

== Education ==
Moya studied at the University of Cape Town (UCT), where she graduated with a Bachelors in Social Science and Politics (2007), Bachelors (Honours) in Public Administration (2008), and a Masters in Public Policy and Administration (2011). She obtained her PhD in Political Studies from the University of the Western Cape in 2021.

== Political career ==
Prior to being elected as Executive Mayor of Tshwane in October 2024, she served as the City of Tshwane's first Deputy Executive Mayor from January 2024 to October 2024 and as a member of the Mayoral Committee for Community and Social Development Services. From February 2019 to May 2020, she served as the City of Tshwane's Chief of Staff to the Executive Mayor. Moya also served as ActionSA's Chief Governance Director from 2022 to 2024.

Moya announced her mayoral committee in October 2024. It comprises councillors from the African National Congress, ActionSA, Economic Freedom Fighters and the Good Party.

== Controversies ==
While serving as Chief of Staff during the 2019/20 financial year, Moya was one of 78 group and divisional heads working for the city that was overpaid. By August 2025, most had repaid the money; however, an estimated R270 000 was still outstanding. Moya stated that she would make arrangements to clear all outstanding arrears.
