= Haniff Hoosen =

South African politician

Shadow Minister of Cooperative Governance and Traditional Affairs
- In office 5 June 2019 – 5 December 2020
- Deputy: Cilliers Brink
- Leader: John Steenhuisen; Mmusi Maimane
- Preceded by: Kevin Mileham
- Succeeded by: Cilliers Brink

Shadow Minister of Home Affairs
- In office 5 June 2014 – 5 June 2019
- Deputy: Archie Figlan
- Leader: Mmusi Maimane
- Preceded by: Manny De Freitas
- Succeeded by: Joe McGluwa

Member of the National Assembly of South Africa
- In office 2007 – 19 February 2024

Personal details
- Born: Mohammed Haniff Hoosen Chatsworth, Natal Province, South Africa
- Party: Democratic Alliance (2010–present)
- Other political affiliations: Independent Democrats (2005–2010); New National Party (Until 2005)
- Occupation: Member of Parliament
- Profession: Politician

Mohammed Haniff Hoosen is a South African politician who served as a Member for the National Assembly for the Independent Democrats (ID) (2007–2014) and for the Democratic Alliance (DA) (2014–2024). Within the Official Opposition Shadow Cabinet, he was the Shadow Minister of Home Affairs from 2014 to 2019, the Shadow Minister of Cooperative Governance and Traditional Affairs from 2019 to 2020 and the DA's spokesperson on the Standing Committee on the Auditor-General from 2020 until his resignation in 2024.

== Biography ==
Hoosen was born in Chatsworth in the former Natal Province. He joined the National Party (NP), which became the New National Party (NNP). He was elected to the Durban city council in 1996 and served on the council until 2001.

Hoosen joined the Independent Democrats in 2005 and served as head of the party's campaign in the 2006 municipal elections. He was soon elected Secretary-General of the ID in 2007. He joined the National Assembly in the same year. The ID joined the DA in 2010 and Hoosen was given dual party membership. In 2012, Hoosen was elected as the Provincial Chairperson of the DA. He became a DA MP in 2014 and was named the party's Shadow Minister of Home Affairs. He was re-elected as provincial chair in 2015.

Ahead of the 2016 municipal elections, Hoosen was selected as the DA's mayoral candidate for the eThekwini Metropolitan Municipality. The ANC retained control of the municipality and Hoosen remained an MP. Hoosen did not run for re-election as provincial chair in 2018.

In 2019, he became the Shadow Minister of Cooperative Governance and Traditional Affairs.

In December 2020, Hoosen was appointed as the DA's spokesperson on the Standing Committee on the Auditor-General.

On 19 February 2024, Hoosen resigned as a member of the National Assembly.

On 26 September 2025, DA leader John Steenhuisen announced Hoosen as the party's mayoral candidate for the eThekwini Metropolitan Municipality for the 2026 local government elections.

== Controversies ==
In 2011, Errol Walters, who served on the Democratic Alliance's electoral college, stated that the party was 'rife with nepotism and cronyism', alluding to the 'parachuting' of Hoosen's wife- Sharon Chetty. The then DA provincial leader Sizwe Mchunu stated: “It’s absolute, absolute lies.” Mchunu explained that: “This appears to be people who are aggrieved they didn’t make it… it’s sour grapes”.

In 2015- Hoosen who was at the time the then secretary-general of the Independent Democrats (ID) found out from the Sunday Star that one of the ID's parliamentary nominees, Narentuk Jumuna, was a convicted killer. Narentuk Jumuna, also served with Hoosen in the National Party. Jumuna, previously known as Shan Mohangi, was convicted of the murder of Hazel Mullen in Dublin, Ireland in 1962. Hoosen later stated 'that had the party been aware of the issue in the first place, Jumuna would not have been selected as a candidate.'

In 2016, Hoosen was nominated as the Democratic Alliance's mayoral candidate for eThekwini. The ANC provincial spokesman, Mdumiseni Ntuli, stated that Hoosen's 'apartheid past effectively disqualified him from running for the eThekwini mayoral position'. Hoosen was a full-time, paid organizer for the National Party during Apartheid- a fact that Hoosen confirmed during a multi-party debate on Radio Al-Ansaar.

Hoosen has called for the review and debate of immigration regulations, reflecting the DA's stance on immigration, which has been criticized as anti-poor and xenophobic. The DA's rhetoric suggests that foreigners are responsible for high unemployment rates and job theft from South Africans, a perspective that has faced backlash for promoting xenophobia.
