= Rainbow Junction =

Rainbow Junction is a development project in Pretoria, South Africa. The development, having evolved over a number of years, comprises plans for a mixed-use development of some 550,000 square meters of commercial property developments over a 140 hectare greenfield site. This project presents itself as a new urban core in the northern parts of the city - "The New Business Gateway to Africa".

== History ==
Originally planned as a mixed used development supporting a planned sports complex comprising a 41,000-seat stadium and an attached indoor sports arena, it was to be used as a match venue for the 2010 FIFA World Cup finals. In 2005, it was reported that no public funding had been set aside for the project and that the Tshwane municipality was seeking private financing to complete the stadium and associated infrastructure. Originally planned for completion in June 2007, the site was downgraded to be used as a training venue for the World Cup, rather than hosting any matches.

After FIFA decided not to use the proposed stadium at all, selecting Loftus Versfeld Stadium in its place, the development was amended. The new development proposal, covering over 70 hectares, comprises eight phased development areas. Construction is expected to be phased in over 10 to 15 years commencing mid-2012.
