= Mayor of Tshwane =

Government position in South Africa

- Incumbent; Nasiphi Moya since October 9, 2024; 2 years ago
- Style: The Honourable
- Seat: Tshwane House, 320 Madiba Street, Pretoria Central, Pretoria
- Appointer: City of Tshwane Metropolitan Municipality
- Term length: Five years
- Formation: 2000; 26 years ago (current position)
- Website: Official Website

The Mayor of Tshwane is the head of the local government of Pretoria, South Africa; currently that government takes the form of the City of Tshwane Metropolitan Municipality. In the past, the position of Mayor has varied between that of an executive mayor actively governing the city and that of a figurehead mayor with a mostly ceremonial role.

The most recent mayor of Tshwane is Nasiphi Moya of ActionSA, who has been in office since 9 October 2024.

== List of mayors of Tshwane ==
Name	Term of office		Political party
Peter Maluleka (transitional)	1994	1995	African National Congress
Johannes Ramokhoase	1995	2000	African National Congress
Smangaliso Mkhatshwa	2000	2006	African National Congress
Gwen Ramokgopa	2006	2010	African National Congress
Kgosientso Ramokgopa	2010	2016	African National Congress
Solly Msimanga	2016	2019	Democratic Alliance
Stevens Mokgalapa	2019	2020	Democratic Alliance
Randall Williams	2020	2023	Democratic Alliance
Murunwa Makwarela	2023	2023	Congress of the People
Cilliers Brink	2023	2024	Democratic Alliance
Nasiphi Moya	2024	-	ActionSA

== Historic office ==
=== Transvaal Republic - District of Pretoria (1857-1900) ===
Name of Landdrost	Term of office		Annotation
Andries Francois du Toit	1857	1859	First Landdrost of Pretoria appointed by Marthinus Wessel Pretorius.
Frederik Korsten Mare	1861	1863	
William Skinner	1869	1878	
Johannes Christoffel Krogh	1878	1878	
John Robert Lys	1878	1880	Appointed by Lord Shepstone
Johan Carel Preller	1880	N/A	Never took office because of the First Anglo-Boer War
Johan de Villiers	1881	1882	
Carel Frederik Ziervogel	1882	1886	
CE Schutte	1897	1898	
Pieter J. Potgieter	1898	1900	Last Landdrost of the District of Pretoria

=== British Transvaal Colony - Pretoria (1902 - 1910) ===
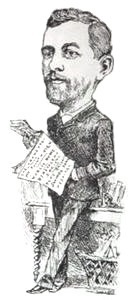
Character sketch of Eddie Bourke who served as Pretoria's first elected mayor

Name	Term of office		Annotation
Richard Kelsky Loveday	1902	1903	Interim President of the City Council (Burgomaster) appointed by Lord Roberts
Eddie Bourke	1903	1904	First democratically elected mayor of Pretoria
Andrew Johnstone	1904	1905	
Johannes van Boeschoten	1905	1906	First Term
John Johnstone Kirkness	1906	1907	
Samuel Radford Savage	1907	1908	
Johannes van Boeschoten	1908	1909	Second Term
Johannes van Boeschoten	1909	1910	Third Term

=== Union of South Africa - Pretoria (1910 - 1931) ===
Name	Term of office		Annotation
Johannes van Boeschoten	1910	1911	First Term under Union Government but Fourth Term overall
Andrew Johnstone	1911	1915	First Term under Union Government but Second Term overall
Constantino William Giovanetti	1915	1920	Mandated to serve Three Terms until the end of World War I
Herbert Prior Veale	1920	1921	Well known Doctor and Radiologist.
George Henry Brink	1922	1925	First Term
William Duxbury	1925	1926	Duxbury Road in Pretoria bears his name.
Claudius Marsh de Vries	1926	1928	

=== Union of South Africa - City of Pretoria (1931-1961) ===
(Pretoria is declared a city on 14 October 1931)

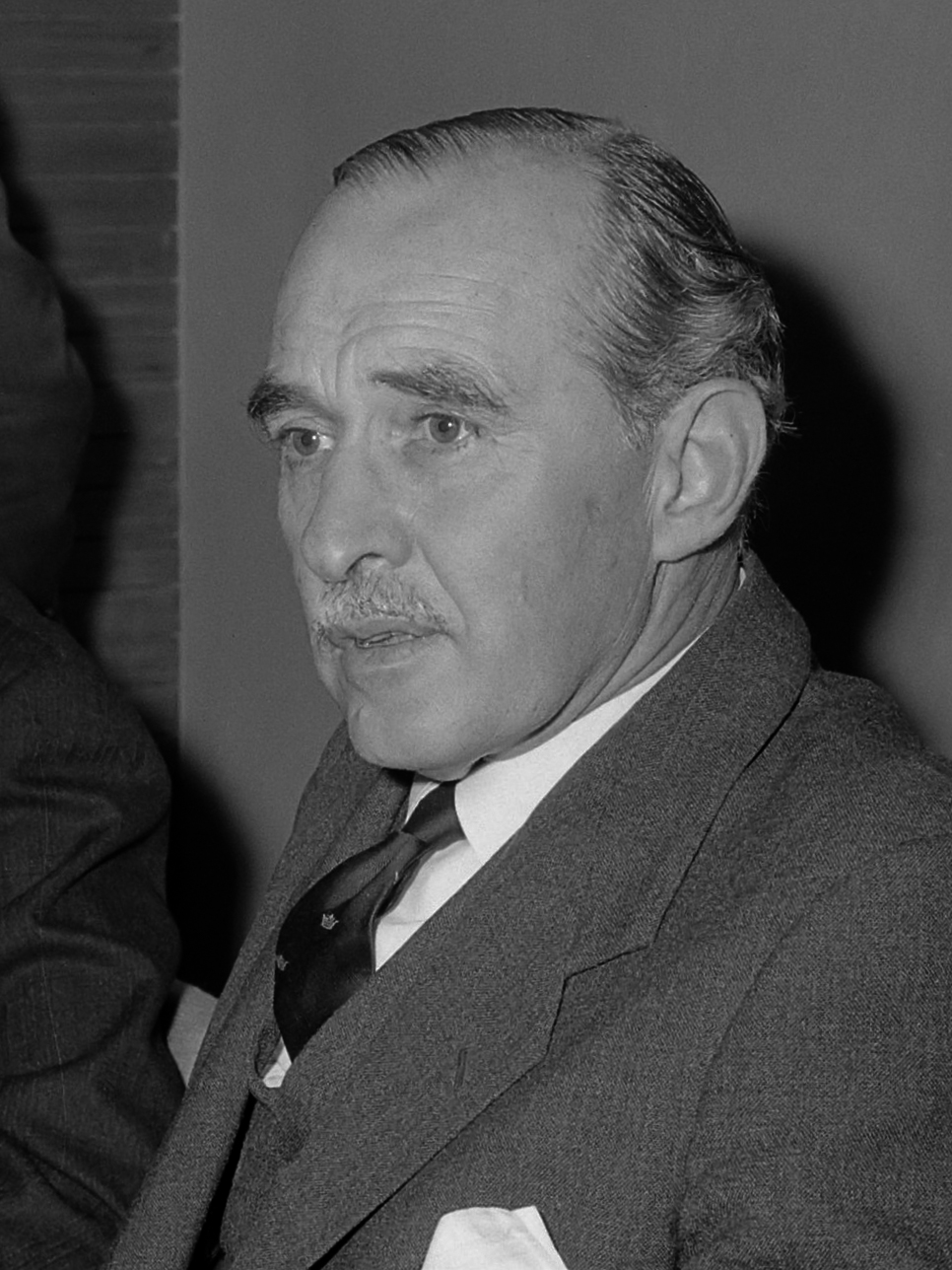
Hilgard Muller served as Minister of Foreign Affairs after his term as mayor of Pretoria.

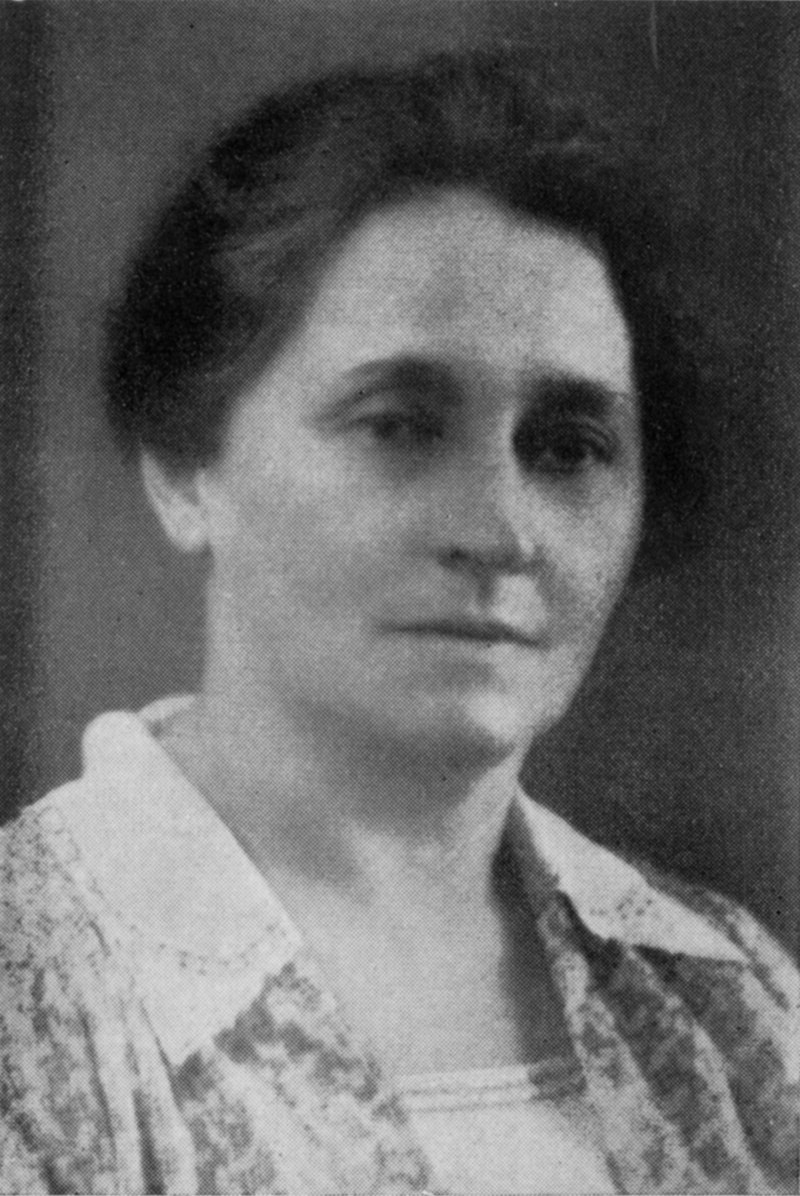
Mabel Malherbe was the first female Mayor elected to Pretoria

Name	Term of office		Party	Annotation
Mabel Malherbe	1931	1932	National Party	First female mayor of a South African city and first Afrikaner MP woman from 1934 to 1938
Ivan Solomon	1932	1936	United Party	
Horatio William Dely	1936	1937	United Party	
James Joseph Cooke	1938	1939	United Party	
Ben Swart	1939	1940	United Party	Ben Swart Street in Pretoria bears his name.
D. Junod	1943	1944	United Party	
Tom J. Jenkins	1944	1944	United Party	Mayor of Margate (Natal) in 1946. Tom Jenkins Drive in Pretoria bears his name.
George Henry Brink	1944	945	United Party	Second Term
Thomas James Frates	1946	1947	National Party	Frates Road in Pretoria bears his name. Member of Parliament (National Party) for the constituency of Koedoespoort (1948-1958)
DP van Heerden	1947	1947	National Party	
Mrs MM Curson	1947	1948	National Party	
Mr CJ Fourie	1948	1949	National Party	
Vivian H Rudd	1949	1950	Ratepayers Association (South Africa)	
Jan Hendrik Visse	1950	1953	Federation Group (South Africa)	
Hilgard Muller	1953	1955	National Party	Minister of Foreign Affairs in the 1960s
WJ Seymore	1955	1956	National Party	
Willem Jacobus Britz	1956	1957	National Party	
Barend Matheus "Ben" van Tonder	1957	1958	National Party	First Term
Lukas Johannes Van den Berg	1958	1959	National Party	
Johannes Cornelius Otto	1959	1960	National Party	Member of Parliament (National Party) for the constituency of Koedoespoort (1961-1974) then for that of Gezina
Tjaart Hendrik van Vuuren	1960	1961	National Party	

=== Republic of South Africa - City of Pretoria (1961-1994) ===
(The Union is dissolved into an independent republic on 31 May 1961)

Name	Term of office		Party	Annotation
Ernest Smit	1961	1963	National Party	
P.J. van der Walt	1963	1965	National Party	Criminologist, university professor
Barend Matheus "Ben" van Tonder	1965	1966	National Party	Second Term
Jozua Francois Becker	1966	1967	National Party	
Hugo K. Truter	1967	1968	National Party	
Philip Rudolph Nel	1968	1969	National Party	Also served as State Architect.
Louis Albert Cloete	1969	1970	National Party	
Gerhard J. Davidtsz	1970	1971	National Party	
GJ Malherbe	1972	1973	National Party	
Herman J. Venter	1973	1974	National Party	
CA Young	1974	1975	National Party	
Klasie Coetsee	1975	1976	National Party	
HP Botha	1976	1977	National Party	
JH Greyvenstein	1977	1978	National Party	
Fanie van Rensburg	1980	1981	National Party	
Servaas Venter	1981	1982	National Party	
Pieter Retief Smith	1982	1983	National Party	
Fanie van Jaarsveld	1983	1984	National Party	First Term
Charl Johannes van Heerden	1984	1985	National Party	
Fanie van Jaarsveld	1985	1986	National Party	Second Term
Johannes Jacobus Steyn van der Spuy	1986	1987	National Party	
Chris Swart	1987	1988	National Party	
Willem of Plessis "Bill" Heunis	1988	1989	National Party	
Ernie Jacobson	1989	1990	National Party	City Councilor 1982 to 2011 Leader of the New National Party on the City Council (2001-2004). Member of the African National Congress from September 2004 member of the executive committee in charge of finance (2009-2011)
François Morkel	1990	1991	National Party	
Bob Zylstra	1991	1992	National Party	
James Leach	1992	1993	National Party	
Nico Stofberg	1993	1994	National Party	
Cor J. Uys	1994	1994	National Party	In December 1994, the Pretoria City Council is dissolved and replaced by a Transitional Council.
