= Randall Williams (politician) =

South African politician

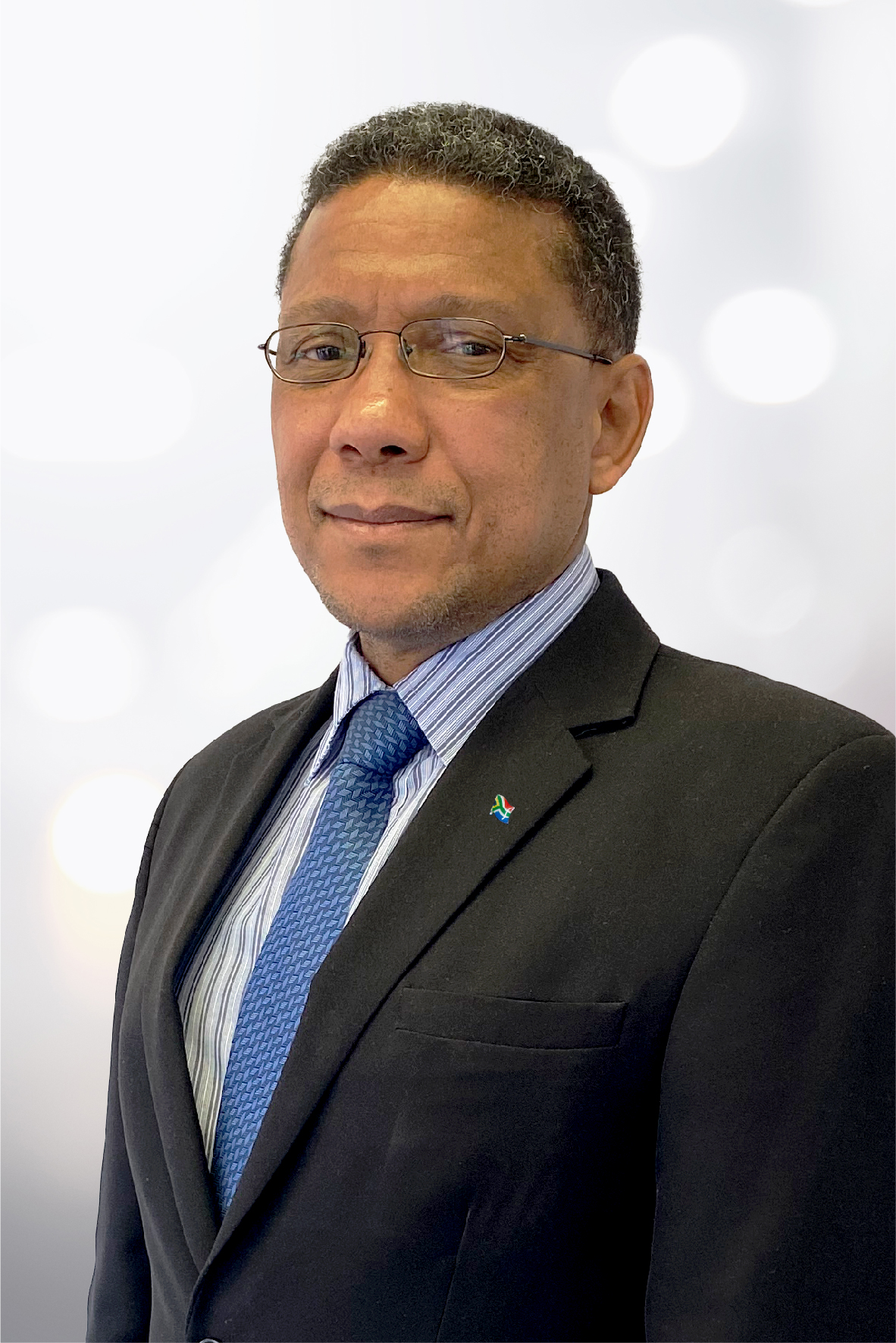
- Williams in 2021

Mayor of Tshwane
- In office 30 October 2020 – 13 February 2023
- Preceded by: Stevens Mokgalapa
- Succeeded by: Murunwa Makwarela

Member of the Mayoral Committee for Economic Development and Spatial Planning of Tshwane
- In office 26 August 2016 – 21 February 2019
- Mayor: Solly Msimanga
- Preceded by: Subesh Pillay
- Succeeded by: Isak Pietersen

Personal details
- Born: Randall Williams Cape Town, Cape Province, South Africa
- Party: Democratic Alliance
- Occupation: Attorney, politician

Randall Williams is a South African politician and attorney who served as the Executive Mayor of the City of Tshwane Metropolitan Municipality from October 2020 until February 2023. Previously, he served as the Member of the Mayoral Committee (MMC) for Economic Development and Spatial Planning and as the Chairperson of Municipal Appeals Tribunal between 2016 and 2019. Williams is a member of the Democratic Alliance.

== Early life and career ==
Williams was born on the Cape Flats in Cape Town. He holds a Bachelor of Laws (LLB) from UNISA and a Master of Laws (LLM) degree in International Investment and Trade Law from Stellenbosch University.

Williams worked as the chief director of International Trade and Economic Development at the Department of Trade and Industry before he was elected to the City of Tshwane council.

== Political career ==
After the 3 August 2016 municipal elections, the Democratic Alliance gained control of the City of Tshwane Metropolitan Municipality. On 26 August 2016, the newly elected DA mayor, Solly Msimanga, appointed Williams as the member of the mayoral committee (MMC) responsible for economic development and spatial planning. He was also appointed chairperson of the Municipal Appeals Tribunal.

In January 2019, Msimanga announced his intention to resign as mayor. The DA shortlisted Williams as a possible mayoral candidate, but later chose Member of Parliament Stevens Mokgalapa as their preferred mayoral candidate. He was elected mayor of the municipality on 12 February 2019. On 21 February, Mokgalapa announced his mayoral committee. Williams was not returned to the mayoral committee.

== Mayoral career ==
In early-February 2020, Mokgalapa announced his decision to resign. The DA then announced on 17 February that they had selected Williams as their candidate to replace Mokgalapa. However, in March 2020, the Gauteng provincial government placed the municipality under administration and dissolved the council. After months of legal challenges, the Supreme Court of Appeal overturned the provincial government's decision on 27 October 2020. On 30 October, Williams was elected as the new executive mayor by defeating the EFF's MoAfrika Mabogwana. He received 97 votes compared to 25 for Mabogwana. The ANC abstained from voting. On 5 November, Williams announced the formation of his first mayoral committee.

On 23 August 2021, DA leader John Steenhuisen announced that the DA had selected Williams to be the party's mayoral candidate for the City of Tshwane for the local government elections on 1 November 2021. At the election, no party won an outright majority and the DA lost 24 seats in council, becoming the second largest party after the ANC.

Williams was re-elected as mayor unopposed at the inaugural sitting of the City of Tshwane municipal council on 23 November 2021 after the ANC declined to put forward their candidate. On 14 December, Williams announced his new mayoral committee consisting of DA, ActionSA and Freedom Front Plus councillors. Williams said he was "relieved" that the DA could form a majority coalition government. The coalition government consists of five parties: the DA, ActionSA, the FF Plus, the Congress of the People and the African Christian Democratic Party.

=== Resignation ===
On 13 February 2023, Williams announced his resignation as mayor with effect from midnight, saying in his resignation letter that "it is in the best interest for continued stability of the coalition in the city." Williams had been under pressure from coalition partners to resign after the City of Tshwane received an adverse audit opinion from the Auditor-General for the 2021/22 financial year during which the metro racked up R1.2 billion in wasteful expenditure. Williams later that same day submitted a second resignation letter that amended his resignation date, changing it to take effect from midnight on 28 February 2023. Finance MMC Peter Sutton was then appointed as acting mayor as Williams went on leave until 28 February.

Williams submitting two resignation letters caused controversy and confusion, on whether he was still mayor or not. EFF members stormed Tshwane House on 16 February 2023 and demanded the removal of political staff and members of Williams' mayoral committee whom the party claimed were no longer in office.

The speaker of council, Dr Murunwa Makwarela, announced on 21 February 2023 that his office had sought legal advice on the two resignation letters and that the legal opinion had found that Williams' first resignation letter was legally binding and valid and the subsequent amended, second resignation letter was concluded to be invalid, which meant that Williams' resignation took effect on 13 February and that the metro was now without a mayor.
