= Stevens Mokgalapa =

South African politician

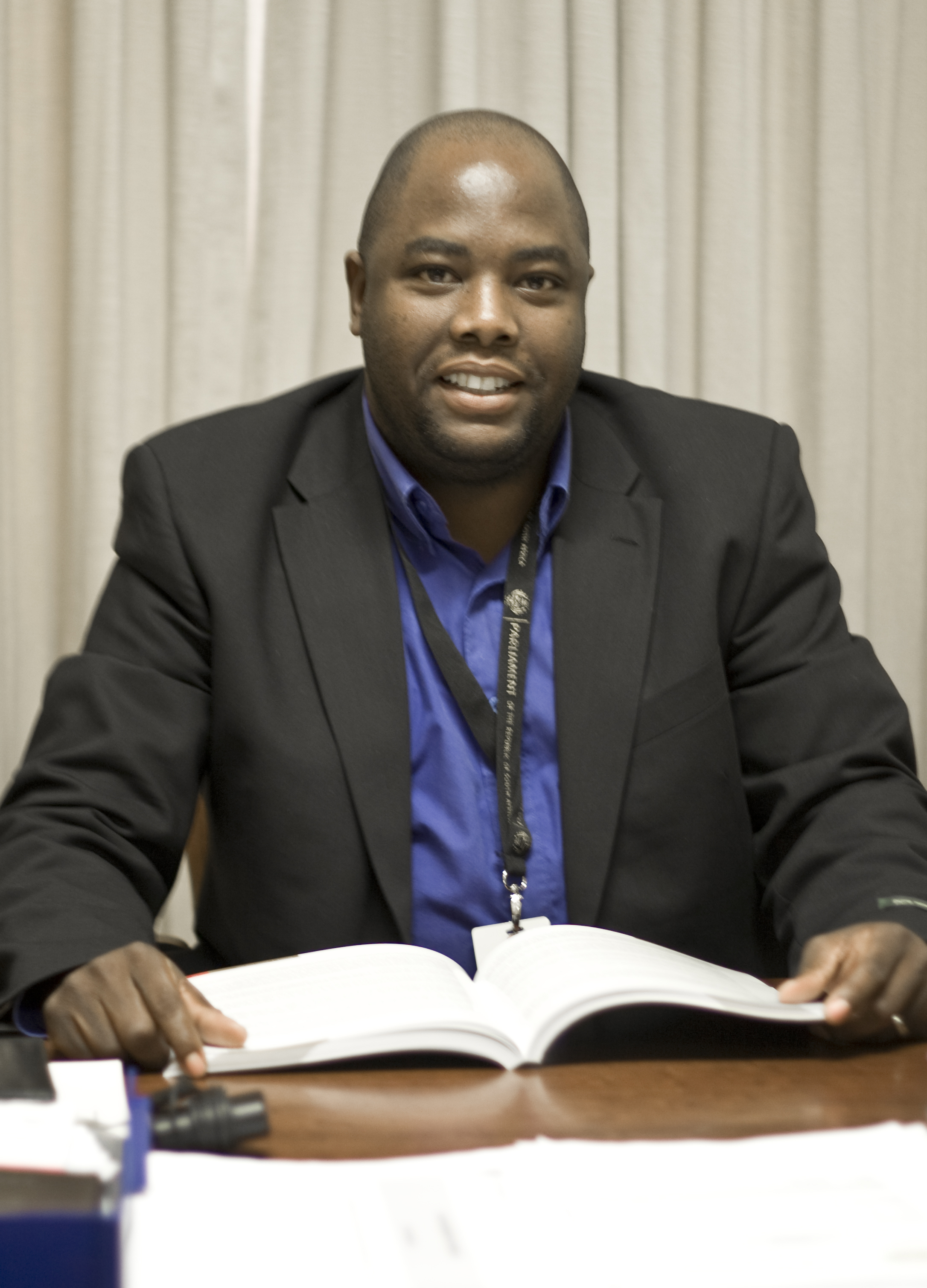

Mayor of Tshwane
- In office 12 February 2019 – 26 February 2020
- Preceded by: Solly Msimanga
- Succeeded by: Randall Williams

Shadow Minister of International Relations and Co-operation
- In office 5 June 2014 – 11 February 2019
- Preceded by: Justus de Goede
- Succeeded by: Darren Bergman

Shadow Minister of Human Settlements
- In office 1 February 2012 – 5 June 2014
- Preceded by: Butch Steyn
- Succeeded by: Makashule Gana

Shadow Deputy Minister of International Relations and Co-operation
- In office 14 May 2009 – 1 February 2012
- Preceded by: Not known
- Succeeded by: Billy Eloff

Member of the National Assembly
- In office 6 May 2009 – 11 February 2019
- Constituency: Gauteng

Personal details
- Born: 9 April 1977 (age 49) Winterveld, Pretoria, South Africa
- Party: Democratic Alliance (Until 2020)
- Spouse: Pearl
- Children: Rorisang
- Education: University of Pretoria; University of the Western Cape; University of Johannesburg

Stevens Mokgalapa (born 9 April 1977) is a South African politician who served as the Mayor of Tshwane from 2019 to 2020. A former member of the Democratic Alliance (DA), he served as a Member of the National Assembly from 2009 to 2019. Within the DA's Shadow Cabinet, he served as Shadow Deputy Minister of International Relations and Co-operation from 2009 to 2012, as Shadow Minister of Human Settlements from 2012 to 2014 and as Shadow Minister of International Relations and Co-operation from 2014 to 2019.

Prior to being elected to the National Assembly, Mokgalapa was a Tshwane Municipality councillor for a period of nine years.

In February 2019, the Democratic Alliance selected Mokgalapa as the party's preferred mayoral candidate to succeed Solly Msimanga as Mayor of Tshwane. He was elected on 12 February 2019 and became the second Tshwane Mayor from the Democratic Alliance. He announced on 2 February 2020 that he would resign at the end of the month.

== Family and personal life ==
Stevens Mokgalapa was born and spent his entire childhood in Winterveld, Pretoria. Mokgalapa attended Motsemogolo Primary and Kgolaganyo Middle School and matriculated from Mabopane High School.

He went on to study at the University of Pretoria where he completed an undergraduate degree in political science and began his honours degree in international relations. He later completed his honours degree at the University of the Western Cape. He also achieved a strategic diplomacy postgraduate certificate from the University of Johannesburg and a certificate in political leadership from St Augustine College.

Mokgolapa is married to Pearl. They have a daughter named Rorisang.

== Political career ==
Mokgalapa joined the Democratic Party in 1999 and its successor, the Democratic Alliance, in 2000. After joining the Democratic Alliance, Mokgalapa held multiple leadership positions in the party. He was first appointed as a Regional Executive Member and was later promoted to the positions of Branch Chairperson and Township Strategy Member. In December 2000, he was elected as the ward councillor for Ward 58 in the Tshwane Municipality. He became a DA proportional representation (PR) councillor following the 2006 municipal elections.

Within the Democratic Alliance Tshwane caucus, Mokgalapa served as Deputy Caucus Chairperson, Caucus Strategic Member and Inner Regeneration Spokesperson. He was elected to the National Assembly of South Africa in April 2009.

Mokgalapa took office as a Member of the National Assembly on 6 May 2009. The DA Parliamentary leader, Athol Trollip, appointed him as Shadow Deputy Minister of International Relations and Co-operation. In February 2012, the newly-elected DA Parliamentary leader, Lindiwe Mazibuko, announced her Shadow Cabinet and appointed him to the post of Shadow Minister of Human Settlements. After the 2014 elections, he took office as Shadow Minister of International Relations and Co-operation following his appointment by the new DA parliamentary leader, Mmusi Maimane.

In 2017, Mokgalapa was elected president of the Africa Liberal Network.

== Mayor of Tshwane (2019–2020) ==
=== Announcement ===
In January 2019, incumbent Mayor of Tshwane Solly Msimanga announced his intention to resign as mayor. The Democratic Alliance shortlisted Mokgalapa and three other candidates as possible contenders for the position. In early-February 2019, Mokgalapa was selected by the DA's Federal Executive to be the party's Tshwane mayoral candidate.

=== Election ===
The 2016 municipal election resulted in no party having a majority in the Tshwane City Council. The municipality is governed through a coalition-led government, consisting of the Democratic Alliance and smaller parties. On 12 February 2019, the Economic Freedom Fighters and the opposition African National Congress did not field any mayoral candidates and chose to abstain from the vote, therefore allowing Mokgalapa to be elected unopposed.

=== Tenure ===
He announced the members of his mayoral committee during a media briefing on 21 February 2019. Six councillors, who served in the mayoral committee of Solly Msimanga, held their positions, while Mokgalapa dismissed four others.

Mokgalapa announced on 25 February 2019 that the City of Tshwane would be terminating the controversial GladAfrica contract.

Mokgalapa delivered his maiden State of the Capital Address on 11 April 2019. Before his address, the opposition African National Congress councillors staged a walkout from the council chamber.

In November 2019, a controversial audio clip between Mokgalapa and Sheila Senkubuge, member of the mayoral committee (MMC) for roads and transport, was released. In the audio clip, Mokgalapa and Senkubuge discussed various politicians. Mokgalapa said that he planned on firing a colleague. In response to the release of the recording, he laid charges of extortion and blackmail at the Brooklyn police station. The DA announced that it would be investigating the matter and placed Mokgalapa on leave. Abel Tau was appointed the acting mayor. Senkubuge later resigned as an MMC and PR councillor.

He was voted out as mayor on 5 December 2019 in a motion of no confidence, though the Gauteng High Court later set aside all the decisions made at the sitting.

Facing mounting pressure from the DA and its coalition partner, the Freedom Front Plus, to step down as mayor, Mokgalapa announced on 2 February 2020 that he would resign as Mayor of Tshwane before the next council meeting at the end of the month. Mokgalapa's last day as mayor was on 26 February 2020. On 30 October 2020, Mokgalapa resigned from the DA.
