= List of South African rugby union teams =

- Country: South Africa
- Governing body: South African Rugby Union
- National team: [[South Africa national {{{sport}}} team|South Africa]]
- Nickname: Springboks

National competitions
- Rugby World Cup; The Rugby Championship; Rugby World Cup Sevens; IRB Sevens World Series

Club competitions
- Currie Cup; SA Cup; Varsity Rugby; Gold Cup; United Rugby Championship; Women's Premier Division

Rugby union in South Africa is centrally administered by the South African Rugby Union, which consists of fourteen provincial unions – the Blue Bulls Rugby Union, the Boland Rugby Union, the Border Rugby Football Union, the Eastern Province Rugby Union, the Free State Rugby Union, the Golden Lions Rugby Union, the Griffons Rugby Union, the Griqualand West Rugby Union, the KwaZulu-Natal Rugby Union, the Leopards Rugby Union, the Mpumalanga Rugby Union, the South Western Districts Rugby Football Union, the Valke Rugby Union and the Western Province Rugby Football Union.

Each of these unions administers a senior professional rugby team that participates in the domestic Currie Cup and SA Cup competitions. In addition, these unions are responsible for amateur club rugby in their region. Clubs participate in provincial leagues organised by the unions; university sides also participate in the annual Varsity Cup competition, while non-university sides participate in the annual Gold Cup.

== Franchises ==
The eight franchises – teams that will participate in professional international competitions – and their constituent rugby unions are:

United Rugby Championship Franchises
Franchise	Base	Rugby union
Bulls	Pretoria	Blue Bulls Rugby Union
Lions	Johannesburg	Golden Lions Rugby Union
Sharks	Durban	KwaZulu-Natal Rugby Union
Stormers	Cape Town	Western Province Rugby Union
Other Franchises
Franchise	Base	Rugby union
Cheetahs	Bloemfontein	Free State Rugby Union
Eastern Province Elephants	Port Elizabeth	Eastern Province Rugby Union
Griquas	Kimberley	Griqualand West Rugby Union
Pumas	Nelspruit	Mpumalanga Rugby Union

== Provincial Rugby ==
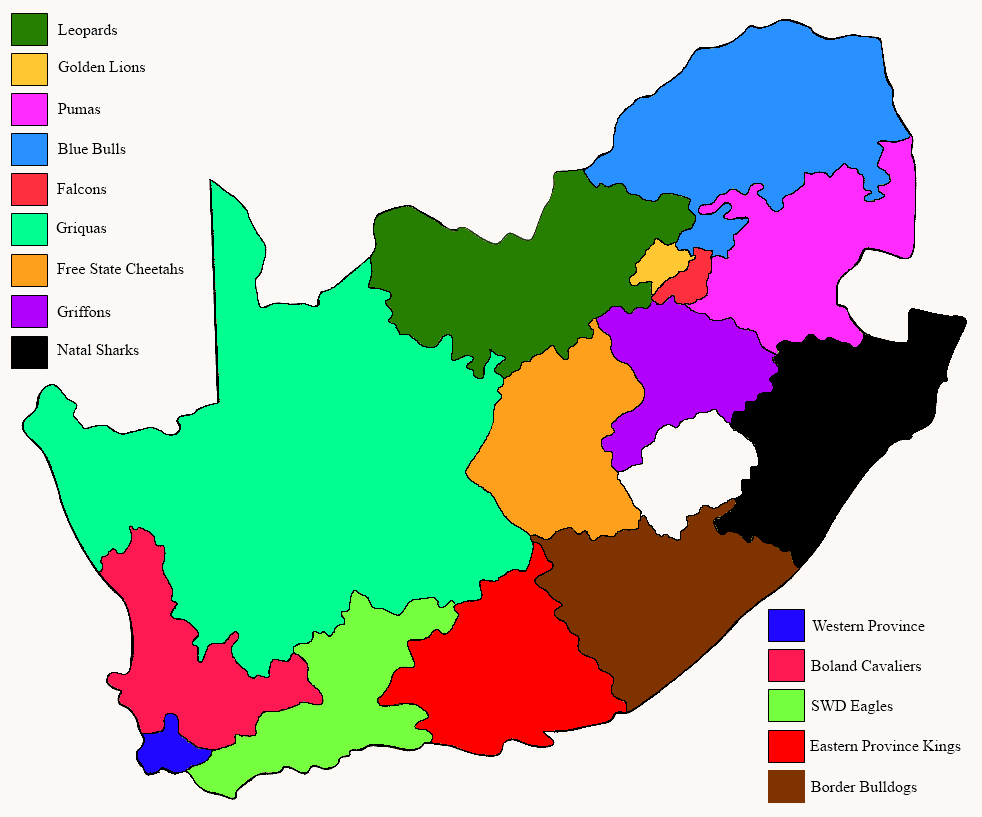
Map of South Africa displaying the borders of the 14 Currie Cup teams

The fourteen provincial unions each have a professional team that play in the annual Currie Cup and SA Cup competitions, plus youth sides in the Under-21 and Under-19 provincial competitions and youth tournaments such as the Under-18 and Under-13 Craven Week tournaments, the Under-18 Academy Week tournament and the Under-16 Grant Khomo Week tournament.

South African provincial teams
Union	Base	Professional team
Blue Bulls Rugby Union	Pretoria	Blue Bulls
Boland Rugby Union	Wellington	Boland Cavaliers
Border Rugby Football Union	East London	Border Bulldogs
Eastern Province Rugby Union	Port Elizabeth	Eastern Province Elephants
Free State Rugby Union	Bloemfontein	Free State Cheetahs
Golden Lions Rugby Union	Johannesburg	Golden Lions
Griffons Rugby Union	Welkom	Griffons
Griqualand West Rugby Union	Kimberley	Griquas
KwaZulu-Natal Rugby Union	Durban	Sharks
Leopards Rugby Football Union	Potchefstroom	Leopards
Mpumalanga Rugby Union	Nelspruit	Pumas
South Western Districts Rugby Football Union	George	SWD Eagles
Valke Rugby Union	Kempton Park	Falcons
Western Province Rugby Union	Cape Town	Western Province

From 2013 to 2015, a Limpopo Blue Bulls team participated in the Vodacom Cup competition. Limpopo Blue Bulls were a sub-union that formed part of the Blue Bulls Rugby Union.

== Varsity Rugby ==
In 2008, a Varsity Cup competition was created, with eight universities competing. In 2011, a second tier called the Varsity Shield was added, consisting of a further five side and the collective was rebranded as "Varsity Rugby". In addition to playing in the Varsity Rugby competitions, these sides also take part in the provincial unions' championships.

Varsity Rugby teams
University	Team	Union
Central University of Technology	CUT Ixias	Free State Rugby Union
Nelson Mandela Metropolitan University	NMMU Madibaz	Eastern Province Rugby Union
North-West University	NWU Pukke	Leopards Rugby Union
Tshwane University of Technology	TUT Vikings	Blue Bulls Rugby Union
University of Cape Town	UCT Ikey Tigers	Western Province Rugby Union
University of Fort Hare	UFH Blues	Border Rugby Football Union
University of Johannesburg	UJ	Golden Lions Rugby Union
University of KwaZulu-Natal	UKZN Impi	KwaZulu-Natal Rugby Union
University of Pretoria	UP Tuks	Blue Bulls Rugby Union
University of Stellenbosch	Maties	Western Province Rugby Union
University of the Free State	UFS Shimlas	Free State Rugby Union
University of the Western Cape	UWC	Western Province Rugby Union
University of the Witwatersrand	Wits	Golden Lions Rugby Union

== Provincial championships ==
Each of the provincial unions have a number of amateur clubs playing in the respective club championships. The highest-placed non-university sides qualify to the annual Gold Cup.

=== Blue Bulls Rugby Union ===
The club sides that form part of the Blue Bulls Rugby Union are:

- Atteridgeville
- Brits
- Bronkhorstspruit
- Centurion
- Correctional Services
- Cullinan
- Dragons
- Eersterust
- Hartbeespoort
- Mabopane
- Mamelodi
- Nellmapius
- Medunsa Campus
- Naka Bulls
- Noordelikes
- Oostelike Eagles
- Pretoria
- Pretoria Military
- QBR
- Silver Valke
- Soshanguve
- Transwerk Parke
- Tswaing
- Tuine
- TUT Vikings
- UP Tuks
- Westelikes

==== Blue Bulls Limpopo Sub-Union ====
The club sides that form part of the Blue Bulls Limpopo Sub-Union are:

- Atok
- Bosveld
- Kwagga
- Letaba
- Levubu
- Loskop
- Louis Trichardt
- Mac Musina
- Mankweng
- Mogol
- Naboomspruit
- Noordelikes
- Northam Platinum
- Nylstroom
- Phagameng Rugby Club
- Phalaborwa
- Pietersburg
- Police
- Potgietersrus
- Seshego
- Thabazimbi
- Union
- University of Limpopo
- University of Venda
- Vaalwater
- Winterveldt

Updated 8 May 2014.

=== Boland Rugby Union ===
The club sides that form part of the Boland Rugby Union are:

- Abbotsdale
- Adelaars
- All Stars
- Ashton United
- Atlantics
- Attackers
- Aurora
- Bella Vista
- Black Leaves
- Blue Swallows
- BONNIEVALE BLUE BIRDS
- Bonnievale United
- Botrivier
- Broodkraal
- Caledon
- Cederberg Leopards
- Ceres
- Cheetahs
- Citrusdal
- Coronations
- CPUT
- Darling
- De Doorns
- Delicious
- Delicious
- Dennegeur
- Die Dorings
- Doringbaai Young Spurs
- Eagles
- Elandsbaai
- Elandskloof
- Elim
- Evergreens Paarl
- Evergreens Wellington
- Excelcior
- Flying Eagles
- Flying Eagles
- Genadendal
- Goedverwacht
- Gold Stars
- Golden Eagles
- Golden Swallows
- Good Hopes
- Grabouw
- Green Lillies
- Greyton
- Growing Stars
- Hamlet
- Hawston
- Hillcrest United
- Hopefield
- Invincibles
- Kleinmond
- Klipdrift
- Koringberg
- Laingsburg
- Langebaan
- Malmesbury
- Mamre
- Marines
- Mbekweni United
- McGregor
- Miracles
- Montagu
- Môrester
- Mountain Stars
- Napier
- Never Despair
- Newtons
- Oak Valley
- Op-die-Berg
- Orchard
- Overhex
- Paardekloof
- Paternoster
- Piketberg
- Porseleinberg
- Porterville
- Protea De Doorns
- Protea Worcester
- Rangers Bredasdorp
- Rangers De Hoop
- Rangers Robertson
- Rawsonville United
- Red Roses
- Red Roses
- Red Stars
- Riebeeck United
- Riviersonderend
- Robertson Town RFC
- Rooi Tiere
- Rooiberg United
- Rosendal
- Roses United
- Safcol
- Saldanha
- Saldanha Tigers
- Samoa Moorreesburg
- Saron
- Sea Hawks
- Spring Roses
- St Helenabaai
- Standards
- Struisbaai
- Temperance
- Thistles
- Titans
- Touwpark
- Tulbagh
- United Stars
- United Stones
- Universals
- Universals
- Velddrif
- Verenigde Ceres
- Villagers Breërivier
- Villagers Citrusdal
- Villagers Montagu
- Villagers Newton
- Villagers Wittewater
- Villagers Worcester
- Villiersdorp
- Voorberg
- Vredenburg
- Wamakers
- Wellington
- Wesbank
- Wolseley
- Worcester Perseverance
- Young Black Arrows
- Young Blues
- Young Blues
- Young Diggers
- Young Eagles
- Young Eagles
- Young Eagles Robertson
- Young Good Hopes
- Young Hamiltons
- Young Hearts
- Young Proteas
- Young Proteas
- Young Stars
- Young Tigers
- Young Tigers
- Young Turbos
- Young Westlyans
- Zebras

Updated 8 May 2014.

=== Border Rugby Football Union ===
The club sides that recently played in the top-level domestic competition organized by the Border Rugby Football Union are:

- Africans
- Berlin Tigers
- Buffalo
- Breakers
- Black Eagles
- Busy Boys
- Cambridge
- East London Police
- Evergreen
- Moonlight
- Ngculu Zebras
- Ntlaza Lions
- Ncerha Leopards
- Ocean Sweepers
- Old Collegians
- Old Selbornians
- Ready Blues
- Shining Stars
- Swallows
- UFH Blues
- United Brothers
- Wallabies
- Winter Rose
- WSU All Blacks
- WSU Eagles
- Young Leopards

Updated 12 May 2014.

=== Eastern Province Rugby Union ===
The club sides that form part of the Eastern Province Rugby Union are:

- Algoa Park RC
- Aberdeen
- Adelaide Rangers
- African Bombers
- Alderonians
- All Blacks
- Auckland Tigers
- Black Lions
- Born Fighters
- Central
- Coldstream Crusaders
- Colesberg Wanderers
- Cookhouse United
- DB Blues
- Despatch
- Despatch Oostelikes
- Easterns
- Evergreens (Cradock)
- Evergreens (Krakeel)
- Excelsior
- Gardens
- Gelvan Wallabies
- Gladiators
- Glen Roses
- Grahamstown Brumbies
- Grootfontein
- Hamilton
- Hampshire
- Hankey Villagers
- Harlequins
- Hilltop Eagles
- Humansdorp RC
- Humansdorp United
- Jansenville
- Karoo Springbokke
- Khyelitsha United
- Kirkwood
- Klipfontein UT
- Kliplaat
- Kowie
- Kruisfontein
- Kuya
- Kuyga
- Kwaru
- Lily White
- Loerie Blues
- Middleberg Eagles
- Mighty Blues
- Mission
- Motherwell
- Murraysburg
- NMMU Madibaz
- Noupoort Diamonds
- Old Grey
- Orlando Eagles
- Park
- Paterson Lions
- Pearston Villagers
- Pirates
- Port Elizabeth College
- Port Elizabeth Crusaders
- Port Elizabeth Harlequins
- Port Elizabeth Police
- Port Elizabeth Villagers
- Progress
- Red Lions
- Rhodes
- Rosebuds
- Scorpions
- Siyakhula
- Spring Rose
- St Cyprian's
- St Francis Sharks
- St Mark's
- Star of Hope
- Steytlerville Dolphins
- Steytlerville United
- Suburban
- Sunday Stars
- Thistles
- Trying Stars
- Union
- United Barbarians
- Visitors
- Walmer Wales
- Walmer Wallabies
- Wanders
- Windvogel United
- Winter Rose
- Winter Rose (UIT)

Updated 8 May 2014.

=== Free State Rugby Union ===
The club sides that form part of the Free State Rugby Union are:

- Bloemfontein Collegians
- Bloemfontein Crusaders
- Bloemfontein Defence Force
- Bloemfontein Police
- CUT Ixias
- Mangaung
- Old Greys
- Steyners
- UFS Shimlas
- Warriors

Reserve teams also play in the league, as well as youth sides of CUT and UFS.

Updated 6 May 2015.

=== Golden Lions Rugby Union ===
The club sides that form part of the Golden Lions Rugby Union are:

- Alberton
- Alexandra
- Diggers
- Eldoronians
- Germiston Simmer
- Harlequins
- Jabulani
- Johannesburg Police
- Khosa
- Pirates
- Raiders
- Randfontein
- Roodepoort
- Soweto
- Titans
- UJ
- Union
- Wanderers
- Wasps
- Wes Wits
- Wits

Updated 8 May 2014.

=== Griffons Rugby Union ===
The club sides that recently played in the top two domestic competitions organised by the Griffons Rugby Union are:

- Beatrix
- Bethlehem Collegians
- Bethlehem Oud Skoliere
- Bobbies
- Bothaville
- Bultfontein
- Ficksburg
- Frankfort
- Harmony
- Harmony Tigers
- Henneman
- Kroonstad
- Harrismith
- Hoopstad
- Kestell
- Koppies
- Klutwanong
- Ladybrand
- Lindley
- Parys
- Welkom
- Welkom Rovers

Updated 12 May 2014.

=== Griqualand West Rugby Union ===
The club sides that form part of the Griqualand West Rugby Union are:

- Aggeneys RFC
- Desert Daisies Rugby Club
- Douglas RFC
- Elevations
- Gladiators RFC
- Hartswater Rugby Club
- Hope Town
- Hurricanes
- Jacobsdal
- Kakamas, Rugby Klub
- Kenhard
- Kenhardt, Rugby Klub
- Kimberley Polisie Rugby Club
- Klipfontein United Rugby Club
- Kuruman Rugby Club
- Marrigolds
- Nababeep Rugby Club
- Ocean Collegians Rugby Club
- Okiep Thistles R.F.C
- Orania Rugby Club
- Oranjemund RFC
- Phantoms Rugby Club
- Pofadder Rugby Klub
- Postmasburg
- Prieska Rugby Club
- Protea United
- Protea United Rugby Club
- Rangers RFC
- Riverton's
- Rosh-Pinah Rugby Club
- Sishen Rugby Club
- Springbok Rugby Klub
- Steinkopf United RFC
- Sutherland Rugby Club
- Tigers RFC
- Victoria Western Force
- United Rugby Football Club
- Universals
- Warrenton Rugby Club
- Warriors Rugby Football Club
- Young Blues Rugby Club
- Young Blues/Williston
- Young Lions
- Young Removers Rugby Club
- Young Stars Rugby Club

Updated 8 May 2014.

=== KwaZulu-Natal Rugby Union ===
The club sides that form part of the KwaZulu-Natal Rugby Union are:

- Amabhubesi
- Amangcesha
- Amanzimtoti
- Ballito Dolphins
- Bergville Zebras
- Black Knights RFC
- Bulls
- Cedara
- Clermont
- College Rovers
- Drakensberg
- Durban Collegians
- Durban Crusaders
- Durban Mets
- Eshowe
- Esikhawini
- Flying Eagles
- Gamalakhe
- Harding
- Harlequins
- Hillcrest Villagers
- Hluhluwe
- Howick Eagles
- Ixopo
- Izinyathi
- Jaguars
- Kapaailand
- Kokstad
- Kwantu
- Ladysmith
- Ladysmith United
- Mandini
- Mangosuto University of Technology
- Matatiele
- Melmoth
- Mtubatuba
- Nagle Dam Rhinos
- Newcastle Highlanders
- Newlands East Brumbies
- Noodsberg
- Obhejane
- Ogwini Bafana
- Pietermaritzburg Collegians
- Pietermaritzburg Waratahs
- Piet Retief
- Pinetown Raiders
- Pongola
- Queensburgh
- Rhinos
- Richards Bay
- Scottburgh
- Sentraal
- South Coast Warriors
- University of KwaZulu-Natal Howard College
- UKZN Impi
- University of KwaZulu-Natal Westville
- University of Zululand
- Ushaka Warriors
- Utrecht
- Varsity College
- Volksrust
- Voortrekker Old Boys
- Vryheid
- Young Lions
- Westville Old Boys
- Zululand Rhinos

Updated 8 May 2014.

=== Leopards Rugby Football Union ===
The club sides that recently played in the top-level domestic competition organised by the Leopards Rugby Football Union (or teams from the region playing in other competitions) are:

- Hartbeesfontein
- Klerksdorp^{2}
- Leeudoringstad
- Lichtenburg
- Matlosana Rugby Club
- NWU Pukke^{1}
- Potch Dorp
- Rustenburg Impala^{3}
- Vaal Reefs^{2}
- Ventersdorp
- Vryburg

^{1} NWU Pukke play club rugby in the Golden Lions Pirates Grand Challenge.
^{2} Klerksdorp and Vaal Reefs play club rugby in the Valke Peregrine League.
^{3} Rustenburg Impala play club rugby in the Blue Bulls Carlton League.

=== Mpumalanga Rugby Union ===
The club sides that recently played in the top-level domestic competition organised by the Mpumalanga Rugby Union are:

- Barberton
- Bethal
- Carolina
- Ermelo
- Groblersdal
- Impala Komatipoort
- Hurricanes
- Kriel
- Lydenburg Rooikatte
- Malelane
- Matla
- Middelburg
- Nelspruit
- Ratels
- Sasol
- Standerton
- Tigers
- White River
- Witbank Ferros

Updated 12 May 2014.

=== South Western Districts Rugby Football Union ===
The club sides that form part of the South Western Districts Rugby Football Union are:

- Adias
- Albertinia
- All Blacks
- Arrows
- Barrydale
- Beaufort
- Bitou
- Black Lions
- Black Warriors
- Blanco
- Bonnievale Blue Birds
- Bridgton
- Buffaloes
- Calitzdorp
- Collegians
- Crusaders
- DKD Mosselbaai
- DKD Oudtshoorn
- Dysselsdorp
- Eagle Stars
- Evergreens
- Excelciors
- Gamka United
- Garden Route
- George
- Glen Roses
- Greater Knysna
- Grootbrak
- Happy Hearts
- Harlequins
- Heidelberg
- Hungry Lions
- Jaguars
- Kango United
- Knysna United
- Ladismith
- Maoris
- Mossel Bay
- Mossel Bay Barbarians
- Mountain Stars
- NMMU George
- Oudtshoorn
- Perseverance
- Plett United
- Prince Albert
- Progress George
- Progress Suurbraak
- Proteas
- PSP Timbers
- Rheenendal
- Riversdal Barbarians
- Riversdal Dorp
- Riversdale Blues
- Seagulls
- Shamrocks
- Silverstars
- Spring Roses
- Super Stars
- Swellendam
- Swings
- Thistles
- Uniondale
- United Stars
- Van Wyksdorp
- Vleesbaai
- Willowmore
- Winter Roses
- Young Leaves
- Young Roses
- Zoar
- Sibanye kings

Updated 6 May 2014.

=== Valke Rugby Union ===
The club sides that form part of the Valke Rugby Union are:

- Benoni
- Boksburg
- Brakpan
- Buffels
- Delmas
- East Rand Police
- East Rand United
- Edenpark
- Edenvale
- Elsburg
- Heidelberg
- Kempton Wolwe
- Meyerton
- Nigel
- NWU Vaal Triangle
- Sasolburg
- Springs
- Vaal
- VUT
- Vereeniging

Updated 8 May 2014.

=== Western Province Rugby Union ===
The club sides that form part of the Western Province Rugby Union are:

- Albions
- All Saints
- Allandale
- Atlantis
- Belhar
- Bellville
- Bishop Lavis
- Blakes
- Blue Jets
- Blue Stars United
- Brackenfell
- Busy Bees
- Caledonian Roses
- Cities
- Cloetesville
- Collegians
- Delft United Rugby Club
- Durbanville-Bellville
- Eersterivier
- Elsies River United
- False Bay
- False Bay Cobras
- Franschhoek United
- Goodwood
- Goodwood Gazelles
- Hamediehs
- Hamiltons
- Hamlets
- Hands & Heart
- Helderberg
- Imiqhayi
- Khaya Rose
- Khayelitsha
- Koshuis
- Kraaifontein
- Kuilsrivier
- Kylemore
- Lagunya
- Langa
- Lower Paarl
- Macassar
- Manenberg Rangers
- Masiphumelele
- Maties
- Mitchells Plain Utd
- Mountain Rocks
- NNK
- Noordelikes
- Paarl
- Paarl Rangers
- Peninsula
- Perel United
- Perseverance
- Pniel Villagers
- Polisie
- Primrose
- Progress
- Raithby Universals
- Rangers
- Retreat
- Richmond Rangers
- Riverstones
- Rocklands
- Scottsdene Central
- Silverleaf
- Silvertree
- Simondium
- Sir Lowrians
- SK Walmers
- St George's
- Stellenbosch Coronations
- Strand
- Strand Pioneers
- Strand United
- Technikon-tuine
- Temperance
- Thistles
- Titans
- Tygerberg
- UCT Ikey Tigers
- Unimilrfc
- United brothers
- UWC
- Van der Stel
- Vikings Police
- Villager
- Vineyards
- Violets
- Violets (Paarl)
- Watsonia
- Whistling Wheels
- Windmeul United
- Young Brothers
- Young Gardens
- Young Ideas
- Young Peoples
- Young Standards
- Young Stars
- Young Wesleys

Updated 8 May 2014.

== See also ==
- Currie Cup
- Vodacom Cup
- Varsity Rugby
- Gold Cup
