= List of National Assembly members of the 27th Parliament of South Africa =

Members of the National Assembly of the 27th South African Parliament
←	26th	28th	→

Overview
- Term: 22 May 2019 – 28 May 2024
- Election: 8 May 2019
- Party control: African National Congress

This is a list of members of the National Assembly of South Africa, elected in the 2019 general election, for the term 2019–2024.

The National Assembly met for the first on 22 May 2019 and its term expired on 21 May 2024. The Assembly remained able to perform its functions until 28 May, the day before the 2024 general election.

== Composition ==
Party	Seats	%
African National Congress	230	57.5
Democratic Alliance	84	21
Economic Freedom Fighters	44	11
Inkatha Freedom Party	14	3.5
Freedom Front Plus	10	2.5
African Christian Democratic Party	4	1
United Democratic Movement	2	0.5
African Transformation Movement	2	0.5
Good	2	0.5
National Freedom Party	2	0.5
Congress of the People	2	0.5
African Independent Congress	2	0.5
Pan Africanist Congress	1	0.25
Al Jama-ah	1	0.25
Total	400	100.00

== Members ==
Members of Parliament, including their party affiliations and the lists from which they were elected, on 2 May 2024:

Name	Party	List
Phoebe Noxolo Abraham	ANC	National
Alexandra Abrahams	DA	Western Cape
Rachel Adams	ANC	National
Nombuyiselo Adoons	ANC	North West
Wendy Alexander	DA	National
Heinrich April	ANC	Gauteng
Laetitia Arries	EFF	KwaZulu-Natal
Michael Bagraim	DA	Western Cape
Obed Bapela	ANC	National
Leon Basson	DA	National
Darren Bergman	DA	Gauteng
Alexandra Beukes	ANC	National
John Bilankulu	ANC	Limpopo
Kate Bilankulu	ANC	Limpopo
Mike Bond	DA	KwaZulu-Natal
Bongani Bongo	ANC	National
Grace Boroto	ANC	National
Wynand Boshoff	VF+	National
Alvin Botes	ANC	National
Eleanore Bouw-Spies	DA	Western Cape
Tammy Breedt	VF+	National
Glynnis Breytenbach	DA	National
Dave Bryant	DA	Western Cape
Zolile Burns-Ncamashe	ANC	Eastern Cape
Elphas Buthelezi	IFP	KwaZulu-Natal
Sbuyiselwe Angela Buthelezi	IFP	KwaZulu-Natal
Sfiso Buthelezi	ANC	National
Ndumiso Capa	ANC	Eastern Cape
Rosemary Capa	ANC	National
Russel Cebekhulu	IFP	KwaZulu-Natal
Bheki Cele	ANC	National
Khanya Ceza	EFF	North West
Steve Chabane	ANC	Limpopo
Mergan Chetty	DA	National
Sindisiwe Chikunga	ANC	National
Naledi Chirwa	EFF	National
Michéle Clarke	DA	Gauteng
Barbara Creecy	ANC	National
Mathew Cuthbert	DA	Gauteng
Sharon Davids	ANC	Western Cape
Patricia de Lille	Good	National
Jan de Villiers	DA	Western Cape
Heloïse Denner	VF+	National
Sibongiseni Dhlomo	ANC	KwaZulu-Natal
Thoko Didiza	ANC	National
Dikeledi Direko	ANC	Free State
Dorries Dlakude	ANC	Mpumalanga
Mandla Dlamini	ANC	National
Marshall Dlamini	EFF	Limpopo
Nkosinathi Dlamini	ANC	KwaZulu-Natal
Sidumo Dlamini	ANC	National
Nkosazana Dlamini-Zuma	ANC	National
Beauty Dlulane	ANC	National
Mary-Ann Dunjwa	ANC	Eastern Cape
Richard Dyantyi	ANC	Western Cape
Janho Engelbrecht	DA	Gauteng
Farhat Essack	DA	National
Cedric Frolick	ANC	Eastern Cape
Mandla Galo	AIC	National
Nqabisa Gantsho	ANC	Eastern Cape
Annah Gela	ANC	Gauteng
Dion George	DA	Western Cape
Virgill Gericke	EFF	KwaZulu-Natal
Nomalungelo Gina	ANC	KwaZulu-Natal
Enoch Godongwana	ANC	Eastern Cape
Brandon Golding	DA	National
Melina Gomba	ANC	Gauteng
Mimmy Gondwe	DA	National
Pravin Gordhan	ANC	National
Samantha Graham	DA	Eastern Cape
Michal Groenewald	VF+	National
Pieter Groenewald	VF+	National
Thomas Gumbu	ANC	Limpopo
Sibusiso Gumede	ANC	KwaZulu-Natal
Mondli Gungubele	ANC	National
Siviwe Gwarube	DA	National
Bheki Hadebe	ANC	Western Cape
Khulani Hadebe	ANC	KwaZulu-Natal
Tania Halse	DA	National
Xiaomei Havard	ANC	National
Ganief Hendricks	Al Jama-ah	National
Judy Hermans	ANC	National
Brett Herron	Good	National
Madeleine Hicklin	DA	Gauteng
Magdalena Hlengwa	IFP	KwaZulu-Natal
Mkhuleko Hlengwa	IFP	National
Altia Sthembile Hlongo	ANC	Mpumalanga
Ntokozo Hlonyana	EFF	National
Bantu Holomisa	UDM	National
Patekile Holomisa	ANC	National
Werner Horn	DA	Free State
Chris Hunsinger	DA	National
Haseenabanu Ismail	DA	National
Faiez Jacobs	ANC	Western Cape
Kenneth Jacobs	ANC	Western Cape
Steven Jafta	AIC	National
John Jeffery	ANC	KwaZulu-Natal
Denis Joseph	DA	National
Pinky Kekana	ANC	National
Karabo Khakhau	DA	National
Angel Khanyile	DA	Mpumalanga
Makoti Khawula	EFF	KwaZulu-Natal
Fikile Khumalo	ANC	KwaZulu-Natal
Ntombi Khumalo	DA	Gauteng
Mirriam Kibi	ANC	Northern Cape
Chantel King	DA	Eastern Cape
Noxolo Kiviet	ANC	National
Zizi Kodwa	ANC	National
Dianne Kohler Barnard	DA	National
Rosina Komane	EFF	Northern Cape
Gerhard Koornhof	ANC	Gauteng
Zoliswa Kota-Mpeko	ANC	National
Henro Krüger	DA	National
Gregory Krumbock	DA	National
Mmamoloko Kubayi	ANC	National
Nomsa Kubheka	ANC	Free State
Nqabayomzi Kwankwa	UDM	Eastern Cape
Ronald Lamola	ANC	National
Alf Lees	DA	KwaZulu-Natal
Traverse Le Goff	DA	National
Tidimalo Legwase	ANC	North West
Mosiuoa Lekota	COPE	National
Regina Lesoma	ANC	KwaZulu-Natal
Sharon Letlape	EFF	National
Tebogo Letsie	ANC	Gauteng
Teboho Loate	COPE	National
James Lorimer	DA	Gauteng
Annelie Lotriet	DA	Free State
Marubini Lubengo	ANC	Limpopo
Bhekizizwe Luthuli	IFP	National
Sahlulele Luzipo	ANC	National
Jerome Maake	ANC	Limpopo
Peace Mabe	ANC	Gauteng
Thamsanqa Mabhena	DA	National
Mandlenkosi Mabika	DA	National
Dorothy Mabiletsa	ANC	Gauteng
Dean Macpherson	DA	KwaZulu-Natal
Ringo Madlingozi	EFF	National
Isaac Mafanya	EFF	National
Nocawe Mafu	ANC	National
Khaya Magaxa	ANC	Western Cape
Gratitude Magwanishe	ANC	National
Tandi Mahambehlala	ANC	National
Fish Mahlalela	ANC	National
Mikateko Mahlaule	ANC	National
Nhlagongwe Mahlo	ANC	Limpopo
David Mahlobo	ANC	National
Supra Mahumapelo	ANC	National
Pemmy Majodina	ANC	National
Fikile Majola	ANC	National
Zandile Majozi	IFP	National
Nosipho Makamba-Botya	EFF	KwaZulu-Natal
Thembani Makata	ANC	National
Mandisa Makesini	EFF	National
Lusizo Makhubela-Mashele	ANC	Mpumalanga
Ponani Makhubele-Marilele	ANC	National
Thabang Makwetla	ANC	National
Thlologelo Malatji	ANC	Gauteng
Solly Malatsi	DA	National
Julius Malema	EFF	National
Cristopher Nakampe Malematja	ANC	Gauteng
Thokozile Malinga	ANC	Mpumalanga
Vuyisile Malomane	ANC	Mpumalanga
Boy Mamabolo	ANC	Limpopo
Buti Manamela	ANC	National
Jane Mananiso	ANC	National
Mandla Mandela	ANC	National
Boyce Maneli	ANC	Gauteng
Sindiswa Maneli	ANC	Free State
Jane Manganye	ANC	North West
Lisa Mangcu	ANC	Gauteng
Gwede Mantashe	ANC	National
Mzwanele Manyi	EFF	National
Omphile Maotwe	EFF	Limpopo
Nosiviwe Mapisa-Nqakula	ANC	National
Philly Mapulane	ANC	North West
Erik Marais	DA	National
Kobus Marais	DA	Western Cape
Paulnita Marais	EFF	National
Thandiswa Marawu	ATM	National
Gobonamang Prudence Marekwa	ANC	National
Bridget Masango	DA	Gauteng
Nomathemba Maseko-Jele	ANC	Gauteng
Reneiloe Mashabela	EFF	Mpumalanga
Paul Mashatile	ANC	Gauteng
Robert Mashego	ANC	Gauteng
Candith Mashego-Dlamini	ANC	National
Tim Mashele	ANC	Mpumalanga
Fikile Masiko	ANC	National
Phineas Masipa	DA	National
David Masondo	ANC	National
Thabile Masondo	ANC	Mpumalanga
Phumulo Masualle	ANC	National
Madala Masuku	ANC	National
Michael Masutha	ANC	National
Joe Maswanganyi	ANC	National
Oscar Mathafa	ANC	Gauteng
Cassel Mathale	ANC	National
Elphus Mathebula	ANC	Mpumalanga
Babalwa Mathulelwa	EFF	National
Nthako Matiase	EFF	Eastern Cape
Mookgo Matuba	ANC	National
Anthony Matumba	EFF	Gauteng
Natasha Mazzone	DA	National
Thandeka Mbabama	DA	National
Simphiwe Mbatha	ANC	Gauteng
Zakhele Mbhele	DA	Western Cape
Bongiwe Mbinqo-Gigaba	ANC	National
Simanga Mbuyane	ANC	Mpumalanga
Lawrence McDonald	ANC	Free State
Joe McGluwa	DA	National
Senzo Mchunu	ANC	National
Thembeka Mchunu	ANC	KwaZulu-Natal
Sibusiso Mdabe	ANC	KwaZulu-Natal
Richard Mdakane	ANC	National
Canaan Mdletshe	NFP	National
Veronica Mente	EFF	Eastern Cape
Kenneth Meshoe	ACDP	National
Piet Mey	VF+	National
Teliswa Mgweba	ANC	Gauteng
Reginah Mhaule	ANC	National
Nqobile Mhlongo	EFF	National
Kevin Mileham	DA	National
Lindiwe Mjobo	ANC	KwaZulu-Natal
Hlengiwe Mkhaliphi	EFF	Free State
Nompendulo Mkhatshwa	ANC	National
Zweli Mkhize	ANC	National
Constance Mkhonto	EFF	North West
Busisiwe Mkhwebane	EFF	National
Jabulile Mkhwanazi	ANC	KwaZulu-Natal
Zola Mlenzana	ANC	Eastern Cape
Humphrey Mmemezi	ANC	National
Thabo Mmutle	ANC	National
Raesibe Moatshe	ANC	Limpopo
Moleboheng Modise	ANC	National
Phillip Modise	ANC	National
Thandi Modise	ANC	National
Desmond Moela	ANC	National
Thapelo Mogale	EFF	Gauteng
Mathibe Mohlala	EFF	National
Ezekiel Molala	ANC	North West
Asnath Molekwa	ANC	North West
Boitumelo Moloi	ANC	National
Motalane Monakedi	ANC	National
Mothusi Montwedi	EFF	National
Stephen Moore	DA	National
Lydia Moroane	ANC	Mpumalanga
Ronald Moroatshehla	ANC	Limpopo
Itiseng Morolong	ANC	North West
Nomasonto Motaung	ANC	National
Refiloe Mothapo	ANC	Limpopo
Angie Motshekga	ANC	National
Mathole Motshekga	ANC	National
Tsholofelo Motshidi-Bodlani	DA	National
Aaron Motsoaledi	ANC	National
Terence Mpanza	ANC	National
Luyolo Mphithi	DA	National
Gcinikhaya Mpumza	ANC	Eastern Cape
Phumeza Mpushe	ANC	Eastern Cape
Christian Msimang	IFP	National
Xolani Msimango	ANC	Gauteng
Eugene Mthethwa	EFF	National
Corné Mulder	VF+	Western Cape
Jaco Mulder	VF+	Gauteng
Nuraan Muller	ANC	National
Queenie Mvana	ANC	Eastern Cape
Nicholas Myburgh	DA	National
Ernest Myeni	ANC	KwaZulu-Natal
Dingaan Myolwa	ANC	Eastern Cape
Claudia Ndaba	ANC	National
Stella Ndabeni-Abrahams	ANC	National
Mbuyiseni Ndlozi	EFF	Mpumalanga
Wilma Newhoudt-Druchen	ANC	National
Sibongiseni Ngcobo	DA	KwaZulu-Natal
Siphosethu Ngcobo	IFP	KwaZulu-Natal
Nobuhle Nkabane	ANC	KwaZulu-Natal
Gabriel Nkgweng	ANC	North West
Zanele Nkomo	ANC	National
Simon Nkosi	ANC	National
Baxolile Nodada	DA	Eastern Cape
Nontando Nolutshungu	EFF	Gauteng
Mncedisi Nontsele	ANC	Eastern Cape
Jeanine Nothnagel	ANC	National
Xola Nqola	ANC	Eastern Cape
Natasha Ntlangwini	EFF	National
Nolitha Ntobongwana	ANC	Eastern Cape
Madala Ntombela	ANC	Free State
Khumbudzo Ntshavheni	ANC	National
Maria Ntuli	ANC	KwaZulu-Natal
Johlene Ntwane	ANC	National
Thulas Nxesi	ANC	National
Mzwanele Nyhontso	PAC	National
Blade Nzimande	ANC	National
Njabulo Nzuza	ANC	KwaZulu-Natal
Gizella Opperman	DA	Northern Cape
Vuyani Pambo	EFF	National
Naledi Pandor	ANC	National
Hope Papo	ANC	Gauteng
Ebrahim Patel	ANC	Western Cape
Nazier Paulsen	EFF	National
Ntaoleng Peacock	ANC	Northern Cape
Dipuo Peters	ANC	National
Joe Phaahla	ANC	National
Phori Phetlhe	ANC	National
Cheryl Phillips	DA	North West
Carol Phiri	ANC	Limpopo
Magdalene Louisa Pietersen	ANC	National
Chana Pilane-Majake	ANC	Gauteng
Brandon Pillay	ANC	National
Emma Powell	DA	Western Cape
Xolisile Qayiso	ANC	Free State
Bheki Radebe	ANC	Free State
Mirriam Ramadwa	ANC	Limpopo
Maropene Ramokgopa	ANC	Limpopo
Anthea Ramolobeng	ANC	Gauteng
Adrian Roos	DA	Gauteng
Ashor Sarupen	DA	National
Leon Schreiber	DA	Western Cape
Albert Seabi	ANC	Limpopo
Isaac Seitlholo	DA	North West
Machwene Semenya	ANC	National
Lizzie Shabalala	ANC	KwaZulu-Natal
Nazley Sharif	DA	Gauteng
Maliyakhe Shelembe	DA	National
Mandla Shikwambana	EFF	National
Floyd Shivambu	EFF	Western Cape
Duduzile Sibiya	ANC	KwaZulu-Natal
Phindavele Mlungisi Sikosana	NFP	KwaZulu-Natal
Nancy Sihlwayi	ANC	National
Narend Singh	IFP	National
Petros Sithole	IFP	Gauteng
Thembi Siweya	ANC	National
Mathapelo Siwisa	EFF	National
Gijimani Skosana	ANC	Mpumalanga
Mcebisi Skwatsha	ANC	National
Jacques Smalle	DA	Limpopo
Sakhumzi Somyo	ANC	Eastern Cape
Primrose Sonti	EFF	Gauteng
Maggie Sotyu	ANC	National
John Steenhuisen	DA	National
Dikgang Stock	ANC	Northern Cape
Dirk Stubbe	DA	National
Marie Sukers	ACDP	Western Cape
Steven Swart	ACDP	National
Bernice Swarts	ANC	Gauteng
Sinawo Tambo	EFF	Limpopo
Parks Tau	ANC	Gauteng
Okkie Terblanche	DA	Western Cape
Yazini Tetyana	EFF	Gauteng
Sophie Thembekwayo	EFF	Gauteng
Wayne Thring	ACDP	National
Florence Tito	EFF	National
Manketsi Tlhape	ANC	National
Bridgette Tlhomelang	ANC	North West
Thandi Tobias	ANC	Free State
Nokuzola Tolashe	ANC	Eastern Cape
Grace Tseke	ANC	Mpumalanga
Alfred Tseki	ANC	Gauteng
Lechesa Tsenoli	ANC	National
Judith Tshabalala	ANC	Gauteng
Busisiwe Tshwete	ANC	Eastern Cape
Pam Tshwete	ANC	National
Nozipho Tyobeka-Makeke	ANC	National
Liezl van der Merwe	IFP	National
Désirée van der Walt	DA	National
Veronica van Dyk	DA	National
Benedicta van Minnen	DA	Western Cape
Sharome van Schalkwyk	ANC	National
Philip van Staden	VF+	Gauteng
Marina van Zyl	DA	Eastern Cape
Thomas Walters	DA	National
Annerie Weber	DA	National
Wouter Wessels	VF+	National
Andrew Whitfield	DA	National
Hannah Winkler	DA	KwaZulu-Natal
Matthews Wolmarans	ANC	National
Cyril Xaba	ANC	KwaZulu-Natal
Nhlanhla Xaba	ANC	National
Phindisile Xaba-Ntshaba	ANC	National
Fikile Xasa	ANC	National
Sheilla Xego	ANC	Eastern Cape
Bafuze Yabo	ANC	Gauteng
Yoliswa Yako	EFF	Gauteng
Beauty Zibula	ANC	KwaZulu-Natal
Sihle Zikalala	ANC	KwaZulu-Natal
Mthenjwa Zondi	ANC	KwaZulu-Natal
Sanele Zondo	IFP	KwaZulu-Natal
Lindiwe Zulu	ANC	National
Audrey Zuma	ANC	KwaZulu-Natal
Thandiwe Zungu	ANC	KwaZulu-Natal
Vuyolwethu Zungula	ATM	National
Mosebenzi Zwane	ANC	National

== Vacancies and replacements ==
A seat in the National Assembly becomes vacant if the member dies, resigns, ceases to be eligible, ceases to be a member of the party that nominated them, or is elected to the office of President of South Africa. The vacancy is filled from the same party list as the former member.

Party	List	Seat vacated by	Date of vacancy	Reason for vacancy	Replaced by	Date of replacement
ANC	National	Malusi Gigaba	8 May 2019	Elected but not available	Rosemary Capa	8 May 2019
ANC	National	Baleka Mbete	8 May 2019	Elected but not available	Thabang Makwetla	8 May 2019
ANC	National	Sylvia Lucas	8 May 2019	Elected but not available	Nombulelo Hermans	8 May 2019
ANC	KwaZulu-Natal	Makhosini Nkosi	8 May 2019	Elected but not available	Lindiwe Mjobo	8 May 2019
DA	National	Gwen Ngwenya	8 May 2019	Elected but not available	Tsepo Mhlongo	8 May 2019
DA	Gauteng	Evert du Plessis	8 May 2019	Elected but not available	Adrian Roos	8 May 2019
DA	Gauteng	Stevens Mokgalapa	8 May 2019	Elected but not available	Manuel de Freitas	8 May 2019
EFF	Northern Cape	Dali Mpofu	8 May 2019	Elected but not available	Rosina Komane	16 May 2019
UDM	Eastern Cape	Lennox Gaehler	8 May 2019	Elected but not available	Nqabayomzi Kwankwa	16 May 2019
EFF	KwaZulu-Natal	ML Matsetela	8 May 2019	Elected but not available	Laetitia Arries	17 May 2019
ANC	National	Nomvula Mokonyane	8 May 2019	Elected but not available	Loyiso Mpumlwana	23 May 2020
ANC	National	Cyril Ramaphosa	22 May 2019	Elected President of South Africa	Manketsi Tlhape	22 May 2019
ANC	National	Nomaindia Mfeketo	31 May 2019	Resigned	Fikile Masiko	6 June 2019
ANC	National	Susan Shabangu	3 June 2019	Resigned	Tshoganetso Tongwane	6 June 2019
ANC	National	Siyabonga Cwele	3 June 2019	Resigned	Alexandra Beukes	12 June 2019
ANC	National	Jeff Radebe	3 June 2019	Resigned	Kebby Maphatsoe	12 June 2019
ANC	National	Mildred Oliphant	3 June 2019	Resigned	Matthews Wolmarans	19 June 2019
ANC	National	Dipuo Letsatsi-Duba	4 June 2019	Resigned	Judy Hermans	6 June 2019
ANC	National	Tokozile Xasa	5 June 2019	Resigned	Sfiso Buthelezi	6 June 2019
ANC	National	Derek Hanekom	10 June 2019	Resigned	Wilma Newhoudt-Druchen	12 June 2019
ANC	National	Bathabile Dlamini	10 June 2019	Resigned	Zanele Nkomo	12 June 2019
NFP	National	Zanele kaMagwaza-Msibi	20 June 2019	Resigned	Munzoor Shaik Emam	25 June 2019
ANC	National	Collen Maine	5 July 2019	Resigned	Sharome van Schalkwyk	5 July 2019
ANC	National	Sibongile Besani	5 July 2019	Resigned	Constance Seoposengwe	9 July 2019
ANC	Eastern Cape	Zukisa Faku	31 July 2019	Resigned	Princess Faku	1 August 2019
EFF	Limpopo	Tebogo Mokwele	19 August 2019	Resigned	Omphile Maotwe	31 October 2019
EFF	KwaZulu-Natal	Mmabatho Mokause	9 September 2019	Resigned	Luvuyo Tafeni	25 October 2019
ANC	KwaZulu-Natal	Bavelile Hlongwa	13 September 2019	Died	Fikile Khumalo	23 May 2020
DA	National	Mmusi Maimane	24 October 2019	Resigned	Dirk Stubbe	3 September 2020
EFF	North West	Godrich Gardee	29 February 2020	Resigned	Constance Mkhonto	18 May 2020
EFF	National	Thilivhali Mulaudzi	2 March 2020	Resigned	Babalwa Mathulelwa	18 May 2020
ANC	KwaZulu-Natal	Dora Dlamini	10 June 2020	Died	Mthenjwa Zondi	31 August 2020
DA	Western Cape	Thandi Mpambo-Sibhukwana	19 June 2020	Died	Dave Bryant	3 September 2020
ANC	Eastern Cape	Zamuxolo Peter	31 July 2020	Died	Phumeza Mpushe	14 August 2020
ANC	Western Cape	Hisamodien Mohamed	24 August 2020	Died	Linda Moss	29 September 2020
EFF	KwaZulu-Natal	Peter Keetse	5 October 2020	Resigned	Phiwaba Madokwe	7 October 2020
EFF	Limpopo	Fana Mokoena	16 October 2020	Resigned	Sinawo Tambo	16 October 2020
DA	Gauteng	Belinda Bozzoli	5 December 2020	Died	Janho Engelbrecht	2 March 2021
ANC	Eastern Cape	Pumza Dyantyi	7 December 2020	Died	Dingaan Myolwa	6 January 2021
ANC	National	Loyiso Mpumlwana	23 December 2020	Died	Brandon Pillay	6 January 2021
ANC	KwaZulu-Natal	Nomvuzo Shabalala	26 December 2020	Died	Nkosinathi Dlamini	13 January 2021
IFP	KwaZulu-Natal	Xolani Ngwezi	11 January 2021	Resigned	Sbuyiselwe Angela Buthelezi	11 January 2021
ANC	National	Nombulelo Hermans	18 January 2021	Died	Ponani Makhubele-Marilele	26 January 2021
ANC	National	Jackson Mthembu	21 January 2021	Died	Xiaomei Havard	26 January 2021
ANC	Eastern Cape	Tozama Mantashe	31 January 2021	Died	Zolile Burns-Ncamashe	9 February 2021
DA	National	Mike Waters	19 February 2021	Resigned	Tsholofelo Motshidi-Bodlani	17 March 2021
ANC	Gauteng	Jacqueline Mofokeng	22 April 2021	Died	Anthea Ramolobeng	23 June 2021
ANC	National	Tshoganetso Tongwane	19 May 2021	Died	Michael Masutha	23 August 2021
DA	National	Phumzile van Damme	20 May 2021	Resigned	Nicholas Myburgh	3 September 2021
PAC	National	Mzwanele Nyhontso	23 June 2021	Ceased to be a member of the party (Note: The PAC had two competing leadership factions. In June 2021 the "Moloto faction" expelled Nyhontso from the party and appointed Joko to his seat. In August 2021 the North Gauteng High Court declared Nyhontso to be the leader and he was restored to his seat.)	Bennet Joko	23 June 2021
DA	Gauteng	Cameron Mackenzie	7 July 2021	Died	Ntombi Khumalo	3 September 2021
ANC	Limpopo	Joyce Maluleke	16 July 2021	Died	Gumani Mukwevho	23 August 2021
AIC	National	Lulama Ntshayisa	23 July 2021	Died	Steven Jafta	18 August 2021
IFP	KwaZulu-Natal	Mthokozisi Nxumalo	2 August 2021	Died	Sanele Zondo	8 February 2022
PAC	National	Bennet Joko	31 August 2021	Ceased to be a member of the party	Mzwanele Nyhontso	31 August 2021
ANC	National	Kebby Maphatsoe	31 August 2021	Died	Gobonamang Prudence Marekwa	16 November 2021
ANC	National	Hlengiwe Mkhize	16 September 2021	Died	Zoliswa Kota-Mpeko	16 November 2021
DA	National	Geordin Hill-Lewis	9 November 2021	Resigned	Christopher Mario Fry	25 April 2022
ANC	Eastern Cape	Princess Faku	19 November 2021	Resigned	Mike Basopu	24 November 2021
ANC	Limpopo	Gumani Mukwevho	19 November 2021	Resigned	Refiloe Mothapo	24 November 2021
ANC	Free State	Thanduxolo Khalipha	24 November 2021	Resigned	Sindiswa Maneli	24 November 2021
EFF	National	Delisile Ngwenya	30 November 2021	Resigned	Paulnita Marais	10 December 2021
EFF	Gauteng	Patrick Sindane	8 December 2021	Resigned	Anthony Matumba	10 December 2021
ANC	Gauteng	Duma Nkosi	16 December 2021	Died	Cristopher Nakampe Malematja	25 January 2022
DA	National	James Selfe	31 December 2021	Resigned	Farhat Essack	25 April 2022
ANC	National	Tito Mboweni	1 February 2022	Resigned	Magdalene Louisa Pietersen	24 February 2022
Good	National	Shaun August	2 February 2022	Resigned	Brett Herron	2 February 2022
ANC	Gauteng	Maggie Tlou	3 February 2022	Died	Xolani Msimango	7 March 2022
ANC	National	Mxolisa Sokatsha	25 March 2022	Died	Nhlanhla Xaba	18 April 2022
ANC	National	Ayanda Dlodlo	31 March 2022	Resigned	Jeanine Nothnagel	18 April 2022
DA	Eastern Cape	Annette Steyn	30 June 2022	Resigned	Marina van Zyl	10 August 2022
ANC	National	Constance Seoposengwe	18 July 2022	Resigned	Mookgo Matuba	2 August 2022
EFF	Gauteng	Pebane Moteka	31 July 2022	Resigned	Thapelo Mogale	2 August 2022
DA	National	Christopher Mario Fry	3 August 2022	Resigned	Traverse Le Goff	10 November 2022
ANC	Gauteng	Anastasia Motaung	14 August 2022	Resigned	Matshidiso Mfikoe	22 September 2022
DA	National	Jacques Julius	18 August 2022	Resigned	Wendy Alexander	10 November 2022
DA	National	Patricia Kopane	15 August 2022	Ceased to be a member of the party	Karabo Khakhau	10 November 2022
DA	KwaZulu-Natal	Hlanganani Gumbi	3 November 2022	Resigned	Mike Bond	10 November 2022
ANC	National	Faith Muthambi	28 November 2022	Resigned	Mandla Dlamini	30 November 2022
ANC	Limpopo	Masefako Dikgale	30 January 2023	Resigned	Maropene Ramokgopa	1 February 2023
ANC	KwaZulu-Natal	Mervyn Dirks	30 January 2023	Resigned	Sihle Zikalala	1 February 2023
ANC	Gauteng	Matshidiso Mfikoe	31 January 2023	Resigned	Parks Tau	1 February 2023
ANC	Gauteng	Tshilidzi Munyai	1 February 2023	Resigned	Paul Mashatile	1 February 2023
EFF	National	Makosini Chabangu	2 February 2023	Resigned	Mandisa Makesini	2 February 2023
EFF	National	Thokozani Langa	3 February 2023	Resigned	Vusi Khoza	3 February 2022
EFF	Gauteng	Mgcini Tshwaku	9 February 2023	Resigned	Yazini Tetyana	10 March 2023
DA	National	Cilliers Brink	23 February 2023	Resigned	Stephen Moore	15 May 2023
ANC	Eastern Cape	Mike Basopu	28 February 2023	Resigned	Enoch Godongwana	28 February 2023
ANC	National	David Mabuza	28 February 2023	Resigned	Humphrey Mmemezi	28 February 2023
ANC	Free State	Dibolelo Mahlatsi	1 March 2023	Resigned	Thandi Tobias	10 March 2023
ANC	Western Cape	Linda Moss	2 March 2023	Resigned	Ebrahim Patel	5 March 2023
DA	National	Nceba Hinana	4 March 2023	Resigned	Brandon Golding	15 May 2023
ANC	National	Fikile Mbalula	6 March 2023	Resigned	Motalane Monakedi	10 March 2023
ANC	National	Dikeledi Magadzi	9 March 2023	Resigned	Phori Phetlhe	10 March 2023
ANC	National	Maite Nkoana-Mashabane	13 March 2023	Resigned	Johlene Ntwane	16 March 2023
ANC	National	Nathi Mthethwa	15 March 2023	Resigned	Richard Mdakane	16 March 2023
ANC	National	Lindiwe Sisulu	15 March 2023	Resigned	Nozipho Tyobeka-Makeke	16 March 2023
ANC	Mpumalanga	Elvis Siwela	1 April 2023	Resigned	Lydia Moroane	9 May 2023
DA	Limpopo	Désirée van der Walt	30 April 2023	Resigned	Jacques Smalle	1 May 2023
EFF	National	Dumisani Mthenjane	1 June 2023	Resigned	Nqobile Mhlongo	1 June 2023
EFF	National	Henry Shembeni	1 June 2023	Resigned	Mandla Shikwambana	1 June 2023
EFF	National	Shirley Mokgotho	1 June 2023	Resigned	Eugene Mthethwa	1 June 2023
EFF	National	Ciliesta Motsepe	1 June 2023	Resigned	Mzwanele Manyi	1 June 2023
ANC	National	Tina Joemat-Pettersson	5 June 2023	Died	Madala Masuku	17 October 2023
EFF	KwaZulu-Natal	Luvuyo Tafeni	5 June 2023	Resigned	Nosipho Makamba-Botya	6 June 2023
DA	National	Lindy Wilson	31 July 2023	Resigned	Désirée van der Walt	1 August 2023
COPE	National	Willie Madisha	15 August 2023	Ceased to be a member of the party	Teboho Loate	16 August 2023
DA	National	Nomsa Marchesi	15 August 2023	Resigned	Tania Halse	23 October 2023
EFF	KwaZulu-Natal	Piaba Madokwe	30 August 2023	Resigned	Virgill Gericke	17 October 2023
IFP	National	Mangosuthu Buthelezi	9 September 2023	Died	Velenkosini Hlabisa	17 October 2023
EFF	National	Thembi Msane	12 September 2023	Resigned	Busisiwe Mkhwebane	17 October 2023
ANC	National	Tyotyo James	14 October 2023	Absent without authorisation for 15 or more sitting days of the Assembly	Thembani Makata	17 October 2023
ANC	North West	Sibusiso Kula	14 October 2023	Absent without authorisation for 15 or more sitting days of the Assembly	Gabriel Nkgweng	17 October 2023
NFP	KwaZulu-Natal	Mzwakhe Sibisi	18 October 2023	Died	Phindavele Mlungisi Sikosana	24 April 2024
EFF	National	Vusi Khoza	1 November 2023	Ceased to be a member of the party	Sharon Letlape	2 November 2023
DA	National	Tsepo Mhlongo	7 December 2023	Ceased to be a member of the party		
ANC	KwaZulu-Natal	Alice Mthembu	26 December 2023	Died	Khulani Hadebe	16 February 2024
ANC	National	Violet Siwela	18 January 2024	Died	Nuraan Muller	16 February 2024
DA	Gauteng	Ghaleb Cachalia	19 January 2024	Resigned		
DA	National	Michael Cardo	1 February 2024	Resigned		
DA	Gauteng	Manuel de Freitas	8 February 2024	Ceased to be a member of the party		
DA	KwaZulu-Natal	Haniff Hoosen	19 February 2024	Resigned	S'bongiseni Vilakazi	8 March 2024
DA	Western Cape	Richard Majola	8 March 2024	Resigned		
ANC	Western Cape	Siphokuhle Patrein	13 March 2024	Ceased to be a member of the party	Sharon Davids	13 March 2024
DA	National	Willem Faber	1 April 2024	Resigned		
ANC	National	Nosiviwe Mapisa-Nqakula	3 April 2024	Resigned		
NFP	National Freedom Party	Munzoor Shaik Emam	11 April 2024	Ceased to be a member of the party	Canaan Mdletshe	24 April 2024
