= List of National Council of Provinces members of the 26th Parliament of South Africa =

This is a list of permanent delegates to the National Council of Provinces (NCOP) of the 26th South African Parliament from 2014 to 2019.

== Composition ==
Party	Delegate type	Province									Total	
Party	Delegate type	EC	FS	G	KZN	L	M	NW	NC	WC	Total	
African National Congress	Permanent	4	4	3	4	4	4	4	4	2	33	60
African National Congress	Special	3	3	2	3	4	4	3	3	2	27	60
Democratic Alliance	Permanent	1	1	2	1	1	1	1	1	4	13	20
Democratic Alliance	Special	1	1	2					1	2	7	20
Economic Freedom Fighters	Permanent		1	1		1	1	1	1		6	7
Economic Freedom Fighters	Special							1			1	7
Inkatha Freedom Party	Permanent				1						1	
National Freedom Party	Special				1						1	
United Democratic Movement	Permanent	1									1	
Total		10	10	10	10	10	10	10	10	10	90	

== Permanent delegates ==
Name	Party	Province	Office
Makosini Chabangu	Economic Freedom Fighters	Free State	
Mergan Chetty	Democratic Alliance	KwaZulu-Natal	
Charel De Beer	African National Congress	Northern Cape	
Masefako Dikgale	African National Congress	Limpopo	
Landulile Dlamini	African National Congress	Mpumalanga	
Bronwynn Engelbrecht	Democratic Alliance	Gauteng	
Farhat Essack	Democratic Alliance	Mpumalanga	
Willem Faber	Democratic Alliance	Northern Cape	
Lennox Gaehler	United Democratic Movement	Eastern Cape	
Chris Hattingh	Democratic Alliance	North West	
Jacques Julius	Democratic Alliance	Gauteng	
Mntomuhle Khawula	Inkatha Freedom Party	KwaZulu-Natal	
Nkagisang Koni	Economic Freedom Fighters	Northern Cape	
Cathlene Labuschagne	Democratic Alliance	Western Cape	
Jaco Londt	Democratic Alliance	Western Cape	
Leon Magwebu	Democratic Alliance	Eastern Cape	
Edwin Makue	African National Congress	Gauteng	
Tsapane Mampuru	African National Congress	Limpopo	
Galerekwe Manopole	African National Congress	Northern Cape	
Hunadi Mateme	African National Congress	Limpopo	
Moses Mhlanga	African National Congress	Mpumalanga	
George Michalakis	Democratic Alliance	Free State	
Emmanuel Mlambo	African National Congress	Gauteng	
Thandi Modise	African National Congress	North West	Chairperson
Seiso Mohai	African National Congress	Free State	
Mohapi Mohapi	African National Congress	Free State	
Tebogo Mokwele	Economic Freedom Fighters	North West	
Moji Moshodi	African National Congress	Free State	
Tasneem Motara	African National Congress	Gauteng	
Tekoetsile Motlashuping	African National Congress	North West	
Thandi Mpambo-Sibhukwana	Democratic Alliance	Western Cape	
James Mthethwa	African National Congress	KwaZulu-Natal	
Simphiwe Mthimunye	African National Congress	Mpumalanga	
Vusiwana Mtileni	Economic Freedom Fighters	Limpopo	
Zukiswa Ncitha	African National Congress	Eastern Cape	
Delisile Ngwenya	Economic Freedom Fighters	Gauteng	
Boingotlo Nthebe	African National Congress	North West	
Archibold Nyambi	African National Congress	Mpumalanga	
Lewis Nzimande	African National Congress	KwaZulu-Natal	
Jonas Parkies	African National Congress	Free State	
Ellen Prins	African National Congress	Western Cape	
Mandla Rayi	African National Congress	Eastern Cape	
Pindiwe Samka	African National Congress	Eastern Cape	
Olifile Sefako	African National Congress	North West	
Aumsensingh Singh	African National Congress	KwaZulu-Natal	
Christiaan Frederik Beyers Smit	Democratic Alliance	Limpopo	
Dikgang Stock	African National Congress	Northern Cape	
Raseriti Tau	African National Congress	Northern Cape	Deputy Chairperson
Ockert Terblanche	Democratic Alliance	Western Cape	
Setlamorago Thobejani	African National Congress	Limpopo	
Younus Vawda	Economic Freedom Fighters	Mpumalanga	
Tabiso Wana	African National Congress	Eastern Cape	
Dumisani Ximbi	African National Congress	Western Cape	
Lungelwa Zwane	African National Congress	KwaZulu-Natal	
