= 2019 KwaZulu-Natal provincial election =

- 8 May 2019

All 80 seats to the KwaZulu-Natal Legislature 41 seats needed for a majority
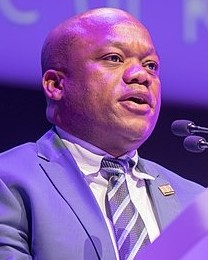

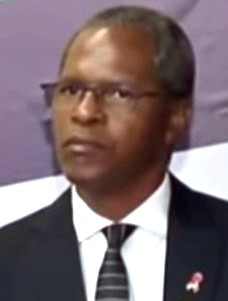
	First party	Second party	Third party
Candidate	Sihle Zikalala	Velenkosini Hlabisa	Zwakele Mncwango
Party	ANC	IFP	DA
Last election	64.52%, 52 seats	10.86%, 9 seats	12.76%, 10 seats
Seats won	44	13	11
Seat change		▲4	▲1
Popular vote	1,951,027	588,046	500,051
Percentage	54.22%	16.34%	13.90%
Swing	10,3%	▲5.47%	▲1,14%
	Fourth party	Fifth party
Candidate	Vusi Khoza	Vikizitha Richard Mlotshwa
Party	EFF	NFP
Last election	1.85%, 2 seats	7.31%, 6 seats
Seats won	8 seats	1
Seat change	▲6	▼5
Popular vote	349,361	56,587
Percentage	9.71%	1.57%
Swing	▲7.86	▼7.45%
Premier before election
Willies Mchunu
ANC
Elected Premier
Sihle Zikalala
ANC

The 2019 KwaZulu-Natal provincial election was held on 8 May 2019 to elect the 80 members of the KwaZulu-Natal provincial legislature.
