= Masiko =

Masiko is a given name and surname. Notable people with the name include:

- Masiko Winifred Komuhangi, Ugandan politician
- Fikile Masiko, South African politician
- Kabakumba Masiko, Ugandan politician
- Tom Masiko (born 1996), Ugandan footballer
