= Hisamodien Mohamed =

South African politician and advocate (1965–2020)

Member of the National Assembly of South Africa
- In office 22 May 2019 – 24 August 2020
- Succeeded by: Linda Moss

Personal details
- Born: Hisamodien Mohamed; 2 January 1965 Lotus River, Cape Town, Cape Province, South Africa
- Died: 24 August 2020 (aged 55) Pinelands, Cape Town, Western Cape, South Africa
- Party: African National Congress
- Spouse: Ragmat
- Children: 3
- Education: University of the Western Cape
- Profession: Advocate; Politician

Hisamodien Mohamed (2 January 1965 – 24 August 2020) was a South African politician and advocate who served as a Member of the National Assembly of South Africa for the African National Congress from May 2019 until August 2020. Prior to serving in Parliament, Mohamed was the provincial head of the Department of Justice and Constitutional Development.

== Early life and education ==
Mohamed was born on 2 January 1965 in Lotus River in Cape Town and attended Wittebome High School. He joined the United Democratic Front as a high school student in 1985. He went on to study law at the University of Western Cape and obtained three degrees. Mohamed also completed a senior executive management course at Harvard Business School in 2001.

== Career ==
In 1990, Mohamed was appointed as a temporary attorney at the Athlone Magistrate's Court. Between 1993 and 1994, he was a public prosecutor at the Mitchells Plain Magistrate's Court. He was admitted as an advocate in the office of the family advocate in 1995. Mohamed was the provincial head of the Department of Justice and Constitutional Development between 1997 and 2019.

He was the first chairperson of the African National Congress in the southern suburbs of Cape Town. From 1995 to 2018, he served on the provincial executive committee of the party.

== Parliamentary career ==
In May 2019, Mohamed was elected to the National Assembly of South Africa as a member of the ANC. His constituency area was Grassy Park. He served as a party whip on the Portfolio Committee on Justice and Correctional Services.

== Death ==
Mohamed died of a heart attack on 24 August 2020 in his home in Pinelands, Cape Town. He was 55 years old and had a wife and three children. The Portfolio Committee on Justice and Correctional Services and the ANC sent their condolences.

== See also ==
- List of members of the National Assembly of South Africa who died in office
