= Vuyisile =

Vuyisile is a given name, derived from the Nguni word vuya, meaning "be happy". Notable people with the given name include:

- Vuyisile Colossa (born 1982), South African boxer
- Vuyisile Malomane, South African politician
- Thembeka Vuyisile Buyisile Mchunu (born 1968), South African politician
- Vuyisile Mini (1920–1964), South African trade unionist
- Vuyisile Wana (born 1987), South African soccer player
