= Mkhatshwa =

Mkhatshwa is a surname. Notable people with the surname include:

- Nompendulo Mkhatshwa (born 1993), South African politician and activist
- Smangaliso Mkhatshwa (born 1939), South African politician
- Vusi Mkhatshwa (born 1979), South African politician
