= Portfolio Committee on Cooperative Governance and Traditional Affairs =

Committee of the National Assembly of South Africa

The Portfolio Committee on Cooperative Governance and Traditional Affairs (formerly the Portfolio Committee on Provincial and Local Government) is a portfolio committee of the National Assembly of the Parliament of South Africa.

The committee is responsible for oversight of the Department of Cooperative Governance and Traditional Affairs as well as other statutory entities, such as the Commission for the Promotion and Protection of the Rights of Cultural, Religious and Linguistic Communities, the Municipal Demarcation Board, the Municipal Infrastructure Support Agent, the National House of Traditional Leaders, the SA Cities Network and the South African Local Government Association.

== Membership ==
As of August 2021, ANC MP Fikile Xasa serves as chairman of the committee. The membership of the committees is as follows:

Member	Party
Fikile Xasa MP (chairperson)	African National Congress
Cilliers Brink MP	Democratic Alliance
Sbuyiselwe Angela Buthelezi MP	Inkatha Freedom Party
Dikeledi Direko MP	Inkatha Freedom Party
Mandla Galo MP (Alternate member)	African Independent Congress
Michal Groenewald MP	Freedom Front Plus
Bheki Hadebe MP	African National Congress
Brett Herron MP (Alternate member)	Good
Mirriam Kibi MP (Alternate member)	African National Congress
Mandlenkosi Mabika MP (Alternate member)	Democratic Alliance
Thandiswa Marawu MP (Alternate member)	African Transformation Movement
Anthony Matumba MP (Alternate member)	Economic Freedom Fighters
Hlengiwe Mkhaliphi MP	Economic Freedom Fighters
Gcinikhaya Mpumza MP	African National Congress
Xolani Msimango MP	African National Congress
Mzwakhe Sibisi MP (Alternate member)	National Freedom Party
Eleanore Spies MP	Democratic Alliance
Phindisile Xaba-Ntshaba MP	African National Congress
