= Vilakazi =

Vilakazi is a surname. Notable people with the surname include:

- Bavumile Vilakazi (1955–2005), South African politician
- Benedict Vilakazi (soccer) (born 1982), South African footballer
- Benedict Wallet Vilakazi (1906–1947), South African poet, novelist and educator
- Herbert Vilakazi (1943–2016), South African sociologist
- Nhlanhla Vilakazi (born 1987), South African footballer
- S'bongiseni Vilakazi, South African politician
- Sibusiso Vilakazi (born 1989), South African footballer
