= Thokozile (given name) =

Thokozile is a feminine given name. Notable people with the name include:

- Angela Thokozile Didiza (born 1965), South African politician
- Thokozile Magagula, South African politician
- Valentia Thokozile Malinga, member of the National Assembly of South Africa
- Thokozile Masipa, South African judge
- Thokozile Mathuthu, Zimbabwean politician
- Thokozile Mbatha, South African judge
- Linda Thokozile Mbeki (1941–2003), South African activist
- Thokozile Mndaweni (born 1981), South Africa footballer
- Thokozile Muwamba (born 1993), Zambian aviator
- Thokozile Sokanyile, South African politician

== See also ==
- Thokozile, album by Mahlathini and the Mahotella Queens
