= Masondo =

Masondo is a South African surname. Notable people with the surname include:

- Amos Masondo (born 1953), South African politician
- Andrew Masondo (1936–2008), South African activist
- David Masondo (born 1974), South African politician
- David Masondo (singer) (1950–2015), was South African singer and drummer
- Sizwe Masondo (born 1987), South African cricketer
- Thabile Masondo, South African politician
- Vusumuzi Masondo (born 1957), South African military commander
