= Sikosana =

Sikosana is a surname. Notable people with the surname include:

- Doris Sikosana (1942–2023), South African politician
- Phindavele Mlungisi Sikosana (fl. 2017–2024), South African politician
