= Chabangu =

Chabangu is a surname. Notable people with the surname include:

- Lerato Chabangu (born 1985), South African football player
- Makosini Chabangu, South African politician
- Zinzi Chabangu (born 1996), South African triple jumper
