= Brandon Golding =

South African politician

Brandon Golding MP

Member of the National Assembly of South Africa
- In office 15 May 2023 – 28 May 2024
- Preceded by: Nceba Hinana
- Constituency: National List

Personal details
- Party: Democratic Alliance
- Occupation: Member of Parliament
- Profession: Politician

Brandon Carwyn Golding is a South African politician who served as a Member of the National Assembly of South Africa from 2023 to 2024. Golding is a member of the Democratic Alliance (DA).

== Political career ==
A member of the Democratic Alliance, Golding was elected as the ward councillor for Ward 77 in the City of Cape Town in the 2016 municipal elections. He replaced Dave Bryant, who was elected ward councillor for the newly created neighbouring Ward 115. He served a full term as a ward councillor and was succeeded by Francine Higham, also from the DA, at the 2021 municipal elections.

Golding was appointed a DA Member of the National Assembly of South Africa with effect from 15 May 2023. He succeeded Nceba Hinana, who resigned from office on 4 March 2023.

Golding was not reelected to Parliament at the 2024 elections.
