= Henry Shembeni =

South African politician

Member of the National Assembly of South Africa
- In office 22 May 2019 – 1 June 2023
- Succeeded by: Mandla Shikwambana

Personal details
- Born: Henry Andries Shembeni
- Party: Economic Freedom Fighters
- Profession: Politician

Henry Andries Shembeni is a South African politician. He was elected to the National Assembly in 2019 as a member of the Economic Freedom Fighters.

From 6 May 2020 to 28 February 2023, Shembeni had served on the Portfolio Committee on Police as a regular member. He was then demoted to being an alternate member of the portfolio committee.

On 6 June 2023, News24 had reported that the EFF had fired Shembeni as a Member of the National Assembly.
