= Teboho Loate =

South African politician

Teboho Loate is a South African politician who is the Acting Deputy President of the Congress of the People. He was elected in the Parliament of South Africa in the 2019 South African general election.

== See also ==
- List of National Assembly members of the 27th Parliament of South Africa
