= Shirley Mokgotho =

South African politician

Member of the National Assembly of South Africa
- In office 22 May 2019 – 1 June 2023
- Succeeded by: Eugene Mthethwa

Personal details
- Party: Economic Freedom Fighters

Shirley Motshegoane Mokgotho is a South African politician, who was elected to the National Assembly of South Africa in the 2019 general election. Mokgotho is a member of the Economic Freedom Fighters.

Mokgotho was sworn in as a Member of Parliament on 22 May 2019. From 6 May 2020 to 31 August 2021, she was an alternate member of the Portfolio Committee on Human Settlements, Water and Sanitation. Mokgotho also served on the Portfolio Committee on Human Settlements between 31 August 2021 until 28 February 2023, when she became a member of the Portfolio Committee on Water and Sanitation. On 23 March 2023, she was also appointed to the Portfolio Committee on Basic Education.

On 6 June 2023, News24 reported that the EFF had fired Mokgotho as a member of Parliament.
