= Piaba Madokwe =

South African politician

Member of the National Assembly of South Africa
- In office 22 October 2020 – 30 August 2023

Personal details
- Born: Piaba Madokwe
- Party: Economic Freedom Fighters
- Profession: Activist

Piaba Madokwe is a South African politician who served as Member of the National Assembly for the Economic Freedom Fighters from October 2020 until August 2023. Madokwe previously served as the Inaugural Secretary-General of the EFF Students Command.

== Career ==
In June 2015, Madokwe was elected secretary-general of the student command of the Economic Freedom Fighters.

In March 2019, Madokwe was announced as a parliamentary candidate of the EFF for the 2019 general election. She was not elected to parliament at the election in May 2019. In July 2019, Muzi Khozi succeeded her as secretary-general. She was elected to the EFF's central command team, the party's highest-decision making body, in December 2019.

On 22 October 2020, Madokwe entered the National Assembly as a replacement for Peter Keetse.

Madokwe was one of four EFF MPs who were banned from attending the EFF's 10th anniversary celebrations at the FNB Stadium on 29 July 2023 for failing to provide buses to take party supporters to the event. On 27 August 2023, EFF leader Julius Malema announced that the party was recalling over 210 public representatives, including Madokwe, for their failure to procure transport for party supporters to attend the event. Madokwe resigned from Parliament on 30 August.
