= Sharon Letlape =

South African politician

The Honourable Sharon Letlape MP
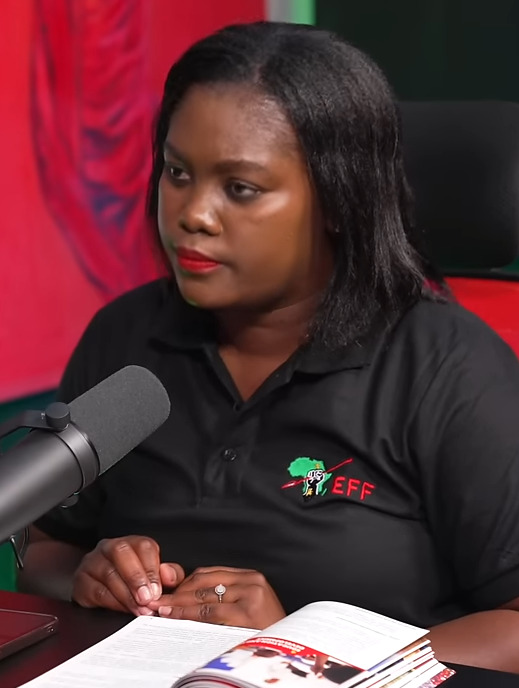
- Chirwa in 2024

Member of the National Assembly
- Incumbent
- Assumed office November 2023

Personal details
- Born: Sharon Letlape
- Party: Economic Freedom Fighters
- Occupation: Member of Parliament
- Profession: Politician

Molebogeng Sharon Letlape is a South African politician from the Economic Freedom Fighters. Since November 2023 she has been a member of the National Assembly of South Africa.

Before joining Parliament, Letlape was a member of the EFF Central Command Team and a councillor in the Rustenburg municipality.

== See also ==
- List of National Assembly members of the 27th Parliament of South Africa
