= Laetitia Arries =

South African politician

Laetitia Arries MP
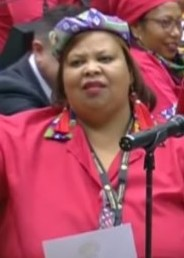
- Swearing-in on 22 May 2019

Member of the National Assembly of South Africa
- Incumbent
- Assumed office 21 July 2025
- In office 22 May 2019 – 28 May 2024

Permanent Delegate to the National Council of Provinces from the North West
- In office 15 June 2024 – 16 July 2025

Personal details
- Party: Economic Freedom Fighters
- Occupation: Member of Parliament
- Profession: Politician

Laetitia Heloise Arries is a South African politician who has served as a member of parliament in the National Assembly since 2025, having previously served from 2019 until 2024. She was a Permanent Delegate to the National Council of Provinces for the North West from 2024 until 2025. Prior to her election to parliament, she served as a councillor of the George Local Municipality. Arries is a member of the Economic Freedom Fighters.

== Career ==
Arries is a member of the Economic Freedom Fighters. She was elected as a PR councillor of the George Local Municipality in August 2016.

Arries was elected to the National Assembly at the general election held on 8 May 2019. On 22 May 2019, she was sworn in as an MP. Arries is one of two EFF MPs from George. The other EFF parliamentarian is Natasha Ntlangwini.

Arries served as an Alternate Member of the Portfolio Committee on Human Settlements, Water and Sanitation between 27 June 2019 and 6 May 2020. On 6 May 2020, she became an Alternate Member of the Portfolio Committee on Social Development.

Following the 2024 general election, Arries was selected to represent the North West Province in the National Council of Provinces as a member of the EFF.

Arries resigned from the NCOP on 16 July 2025. She was sworn in as a member of the National Assembly the following week.
