= Gabriel Nkgweng =

South African politician

Gabriel Nare Nkgweng is a South African politician from the African National Congress. Since October 2023 he has been a member of the National Assembly of South Africa representing North West Province.

== See also ==
- List of National Assembly members of the 27th Parliament of South Africa
