= Traverse Le Goff =

South African politician and actor

Traverse Anatole Le Goff

Member of the National Assembly of South Africa
- In office 16 November 2022 – 28 May 2024
- Preceded by: Christopher Mario Fry
- Constituency: Western Cape

Personal details
- Born: Traverse Anatole Le Goff; 5 August 1983 (age 42) Johannesburg, South Africa
- Party: Democratic Alliance
- Education: Northcliff High School
- Alma mater: University of South Africa (BA (Hons))
- Profession: Actor, politician

Traverse Anatole Le Goff (born 5 August 1983) is a South African actor and politician who served as a Member of the 6th Parliament in the National Assembly of the Republic of South Africa from November 2022 until June 2024.

He also served as a Democratic Alliance municipal Councillor in the City of Cape Town from July 2024 to May 2025, and previously from November 2021 until November 2022.

== Early life and education ==
Le Goff was born in Johannesburg, Gauteng and he grew up in Northcliff and on the Atlantic Seaboard in Cape Town. Le Goff matriculated from Northcliff High School. He has a Bachelor of Arts degree in Politics, Philosophy and Economics, and is completing an honours degree in International Politics from the University of South Africa.

== Career ==
In November 2021, Le Goff was elected to the City of Cape Town Council as a proportional representation Councillor for the DA. He served on the Energy Portfolio Committee as well as the Future Planning and Resilience Portfolio Committee. In October 2022, Le Goff made an address, and a formal written submission in his official capacity as a municipal Councillor on behalf of the City of Cape Town to the Parliamentary Portfolio Committee on Forestry, Fisheries and the Environment as part of the deliberations on the Climate Change Bill .

On 10 November 2022, Le Goff was named the replacement for former DA MP Christopher Mario Fry. He was sworn in as a Member of the National Assembly in the Parliament of the Republic of South Africa on 16 November 2022.

Le Goff was appointed as an Additional Member on the Parliamentary Portfolio Committee on Mineral Resources and Energy by DA Federal Leader John Steenhuisen on 27 January 2023. In preparation for the 2024 South African general election Le Goff was reassigned as an Additional Member to the Parliamentary Portfolio Committee on Employment and Labour on 21 April 2023.

On the 17 January 2024 Le Goff was appointed as Shadow Deputy Minister of Employment and Labour by DA Federal Leader John Steenhuisen.

In March 2024, News24 reported that Le Goff had been placed on the DA's candidate list for the Western Cape Provincial Parliament for the general election on 29 May 2024. He was not elected, however, he returned to the Cape Town City Council in July 2024.

On the 25 May 2025 Le Goff resigned from the City of Cape Town Council to take up an appointment in the Government of National Unity as the Private Secretary to the Minister of Forestry, Fisheries and the Environment of the Republic of South Africa.

== Television ==
Year	Title	Role	Notes	Ref(s)
2007	Jacob's Cross	Stablehand	1 Episode; Television series	
2007	The Raven	Drake	Television film	
2008	Generation Kill	Marine	Uncredited; Television miniseries	
2013	Stike Back	Section 20 Tech Soldier	Uncredited; Television series	
2014	Generations	Jimmy South	8 Episodes; Television series	
2014	Muvhango	Wedding planner	1 Episode; Television series	
2015	Skeem Saam	Edward Brown	8 Episodes; Television series	
2017	Scandal!	Assassin, hitman	2 Episodes; Television series	
2021	Tali's Baby Diary	Property Guy	1 Episode; Television series	
2022	Theodore Roosevelt	Referee	1 Episode; Television miniseries	
2022	Theodore Roosevelt	Joe - Reporter 1 (Washington D.C.)	1 Episode; Television miniseries	
2023	Catch Me A Killer	Identikit Artist	1 Episode; Television miniseries	
