= Tania Halse =

South African politician

Member of the National Assembly of South Africa
- In office 2023–2024

Personal details
- Party: Democratic Alliance

Tania Halse is a South African politician from the Democratic Alliance (DA), who served as a member of the National Assembly of South Africa from 2023 to 2024.

She previously served as a councillor in Mantsopa Local Municipality. She was not reelected to Parliament at the 2024 elections.

== See also ==
- List of National Assembly members of the 27th Parliament of South Africa
