= Matshidiso Mfikoe =

South African politician (born 1972)

Matshidiso Mfikoe MPL

Member of the Gauteng Provincial Legislature
- Incumbent
- Assumed office 2 February 2023

Member of the National Assembly of South Africa
- In office 10 October 2022 – 31 January 2023
- Preceded by: Anastasia Motaung
- Succeeded by: Parks Tau

Personal details
- Born: 1972 (age 53–54) Alexandra, Johannesburg, South Africa
- Party: African National Congress
- Children: 2
- Education: MANCOSA; Regenesys Business School

Matshidiso Morwa Annastinah Mfikoe (born 1972) is a South African politician who has served as a member of the Gauteng Provincial Legislature since February 2023. A member of the African National Congress, she previously served as a member of the National Assembly from October 2022 to January 2023 and before that, as a councillor in the City of Johannesburg from 2000 to 2022 and as a member of the mayoral committee from 2006 to 2016 and again in 2021.

== Early life and education ==
Mfikoe was born in 1972 in Alexandra, Johannesburg. She was a student activist in Soweto, participating in the student youth movements. She was as a member of the Soweto Student Congress (SOSCO) as well as the Soweto Youth Congress (SOYCO). Mfikoe matriculated from Progress Comprehensive High School in Pimville, Soweto in 1991 and became a member of the local African National Congress structures.

Mfikoe earned a bachelor's degree in Public Management and Governance from Regenesys Business School, and a Master of Business Administration from the Management College of Southern Africa.

== Political career ==
Mfikoe was a member of the African National Congress Youth League and served as a regional secretary of the youth league until 2000. From 2005 to 2008, she served as a member of the Regional Executive Committee of the ANC in Johannesburg. Mfikoe is also a member of the African National Congress Women's League.

In 2000, Mfikoe was elected as a municipal councillor for the ANC of the city council of the newly established City of Johannesburg Metropolitan Municipality. She was a member of the municipal services committee. She joined the mayoral committee of Amos Masondo in 2006 as the mayoral committee member responsible for health. In 2009, Mfikoe was appointed as MMC for Environment and Cooperate Services. Mfikoe became the Member of the Mayoral Committee for Public Safety in the mayoral committee of Parks Tau in 2011.

In 2012, Mfikoe was appointed as MMC for Environment and Infrastructure Services. The ANC lost control of the metro in 2016. In August 2021, Mfikoe returned to the mayoral committee as Finance MMC in the executive led by ANC mayor Jolidee Matongo. Following Matongo's death in a car accident in September 2021, newly elected mayor Mpho Moerane's mayoral committee remain unchanged with Mfikoe as MMC for Finance. The ANC lost control of the metro again in November 2021.

On 10 October 2022, Mfikoe was sworn in as a Member of Parliament. She was a member of the Portfolio Committee on Social Development. Mifikoe resigned from Parliament in January 2023 to make way for Gauteng MPL Parks Tau to take up her seat in the National Assembly. She was, in turn, sworn in as a member of the Gauteng Provincial Legislature.
