= Naledi Chirwa =

South African feminist, legislator and student activist

The Honourable Naledi Chirwa-Mpungose MP
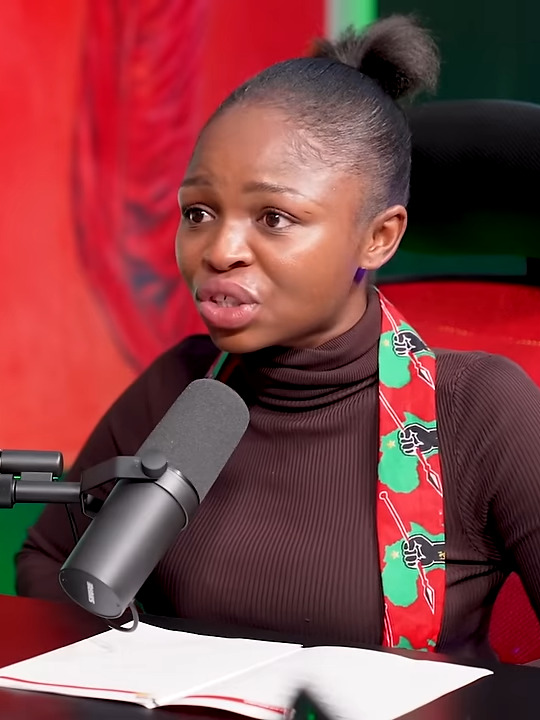
- Chirwa in 2024

Member of the National Assembly
- Incumbent
- Assumed office 11 June 2025

Permanent Delegate to the National Council of Provinces
- In office 15 June 2024 – 11 June 2025

Member of the National Assembly
- In office 22 May 2019 – 21 May 2024

Personal details
- Born: Naledi Nokukhanya Chirwa; 22 July 1993 (age 33) Vosloorus, East Rand; Transvaal, South Africa
- Party: Economic Freedom Fighters (2015–present)
- Children: 2
- Education: University of Pretoria
- Occupation: Member of Parliament
- Profession: Politician

Naledi Nokukhanya Chirwa-Mpungose (born 22 July 1993) is a South African politician and former student activist from Gauteng. She represents the Economic Freedom Fighters (EFF) in the National Assembly. She was formerly a member of the National Assembly between May 2019 and June 2024. She had a short stint in the National Council of Provinces before being redeployed to the National Assembly to replace Mbuyiseni Ndlozi. She rose to prominence through her involvement in the #FeesMustFall student protests at the University of Pretoria between 2015 and 2016.

== Early life and education ==
Chirwa was born on 22 July 1993 in Vosloorus, East Rand, in Gauteng. She was raised by her grandmother in Mamelodi, Pretoria. In 2009, aged 15, she served as the deputy president of the Tshwane North College (TNC) Further Education & Training (FET), now TNC TVET.

Chirwa earned a Bachelor of Arts and a Honours degree in Drama and Film Studies at the University of Pretoria. As of 2019 she was pursuing a Master of Arts in Theatre and Performance at the University of the Witwatersrand.

== Student activism ==
She joined the Economic Freedom Fighters (EFF) in 2015 and became a member of the party's Student Command at the University of Pretoria. She was appointed as the command's communications officer. In August 2016, during former president Jacob Zuma's speech at the IEC election centre following the 2016 municipal elections, Chirwa and three other student activists disrupted his speech while holding up signs reading "Khanga", "Remember Khwezi", "I am 1 in 3" and "10 yrs later", in reference to Zuma's rape trial of the mid-2000s.

Also in 2016, Chirwa was involved in student protests relating to the #FeesMustFall movement. She was later arrested and suspended on campus as part of her bail conditions. In 2017, she was one of the Mail & Guardian's 200 Young South Africans.

== Parliamentary career ==
=== National Assembly: 2019–2024 ===
In the May 2019 general election, she was elected to the National Assembly of South Africa and became the EFF's youngest Member of Parliament. She was sworn in alongside other student activists, including Peter Keetse, Nompendulo Mkhatshwa and Vuyani Pambo. She was a member of Parliament's Portfolio Committee on Health.

On 25 June 2019, she delivered her maiden speech during the State of the Nation Address debate. She was forced to withdraw a comment about the government being complicit in the murders of #FeesMustFall activists. In January 2022, she trended on Twitter for calling President Cyril Ramaphosa "toothless" and a "weak little boy".

From around 2020, Chirwa was subject to social media attacks from anonymous users who claimed without substantiation that she was a Malawian national and that her family had fraudulently obtained South African citizenship. In January 2022, she responded to the allegations by tweeting: "You can lie to yourselves about my nationality until you turn green in the buttocks. It will not make your lies the truth and neither will it ever silence me. I didn't buy my voice. I'm not renting it either. Rest assured, I will always speak and there's nothing you can do about it."

In March 2024, Chirwa was absent from a parliamentary vote in order to care for her unwell child. The EFF fined her and instructed her to apologise. Shortly afterwards, the EFF released its list of candidates for the upcoming general election, which listed Chirwa in last place. EFF leader Julius Malema said that her demotion was the result of a democratic party process.

=== National Council of Provinces: June 2024–January 2025 ===
In the May 2024 general election, Chirwa was elected to represent the EFF in the Gauteng delegation to the National Council of Provinces, the upper house of the South African Parliament. She was sworn in to her seat on 15 June 2024.

== Personal life ==
Chirwa has been married since October 2022. Following the marriage, she officially changed her last name. She has two children, one of whom was born in 2021 and the other one born in 2023.
