= Mandla Dlamini =

South African politician

Mandla Emmanuel Dlamini is a South African politician from the African National Congress. He was the party's Western Cape spokesperson.

== See also ==
- List of National Assembly members of the 27th Parliament of South Africa
