= Nuraan Muller =

South African politician

Nuraan Muller is a South African politician from African National Congress and member of the National Assembly of South Africa since 16 February 2023. She replaced Violet Siwela who died.

== See also ==
- List of National Assembly members of the 27th Parliament of South Africa
- Nuraan Muller at People's Assembly
