= Xolani Msimango =

South African politician

Member of the National Assembly of South Africa
- In office 7 March 2022 – 28 May 2024
- Preceded by: Maggie Tlou

Personal details
- Born: Xolani Nkuleko Msimango
- Party: African National Congress

Xolani Nkuleko Msimango is a South African politician who served as a Member of the National Assembly of South Africa for the African National Congress from March 2022 until May 2024. He was a member of the Portfolio Committee on Cooperative Governance and Traditional Affairs.

Msimango was appointed to the National Assembly to replace Maggie Tlou, who died in February 2022.
