= Phori Phetlhe =

South African politician

Member of the National Assembly of South Africa
- In office 15 March 2023 – 28 May 2024

Personal details
- Party: African National Congress
- Profession: Politician

Phori Angeline Phetlhe is a South African politician who served as a Member of the National Assembly of South Africa from March 2023 until May 2024.

A member of the African National Congress, Phetlhe unsuccessfully stood for the South African National Assembly in the 2019 general election as a candidate on the party's national list.

Phetlhe was sworn in as a Member of the National Assembly on 15 March 2023. She was ranked too low to secure reelection in the 2024 general election and left parliament.
