= Marina van Zyl =

South African politician

Marina van Zyl (born 1982) is a South African politician from the Democratic Alliance and member of the National Assembly of South Africa.

== Early life ==
Van Zyl grew up in Burgersdorp.

== Political career ==
In August 2022, she joined the Committee on Basic Education.

On 21 April 2023, Van Zyl became Shadow Deputy Minister of Basic Education in the Shadow Cabinet of John Steenhuisen. Van Zyl was elected to a full term in the National Assembly in the 2024 general election.
