= Johlene Ntwane =

South African politician

Member of the National Assembly of South Africa
- In office 22 March 2023 – 28 May 2024

Personal details
- Born: 1968 or 1969 (age 56–57)
- Party: African National Congress
- Children: 2
- Education: University of the Western Cape

Johlene Christine Ntwane (born 1968 or 1969) is a South African politician. From March 2023 to May 2024, she served as a Member of the National Assembly of South Africa representing the African National Congress.

== Biography ==
Ntwane became involved in politics while a student at the University of the Western Cape. She joined the African National Congress in 1990. By 2012 she was a member of the ANC's Bram Fischer branch in Kimberley in the Northern Cape.

Ntwane is married and has two children. In 2012, she owned a business which specialised in heritage, cultural and project management.

Ntwane unsuccessfully stood for the National Assembly of South Africa in the 2019 general election, ranked number 145 on the ANC national list as the party's electoral support decreased which resulted in less ANC MPs being elected from the party's national list. She did, however, enter the National Assembly on 22 March 2023 as a replacement for former cabinet minister Maite Nkoana-Mashabane.

Ntwane did not stand in the 2024 general election and left parliament.
