= Nompendulo Mkhatshwa =

South African politician (born 1993)

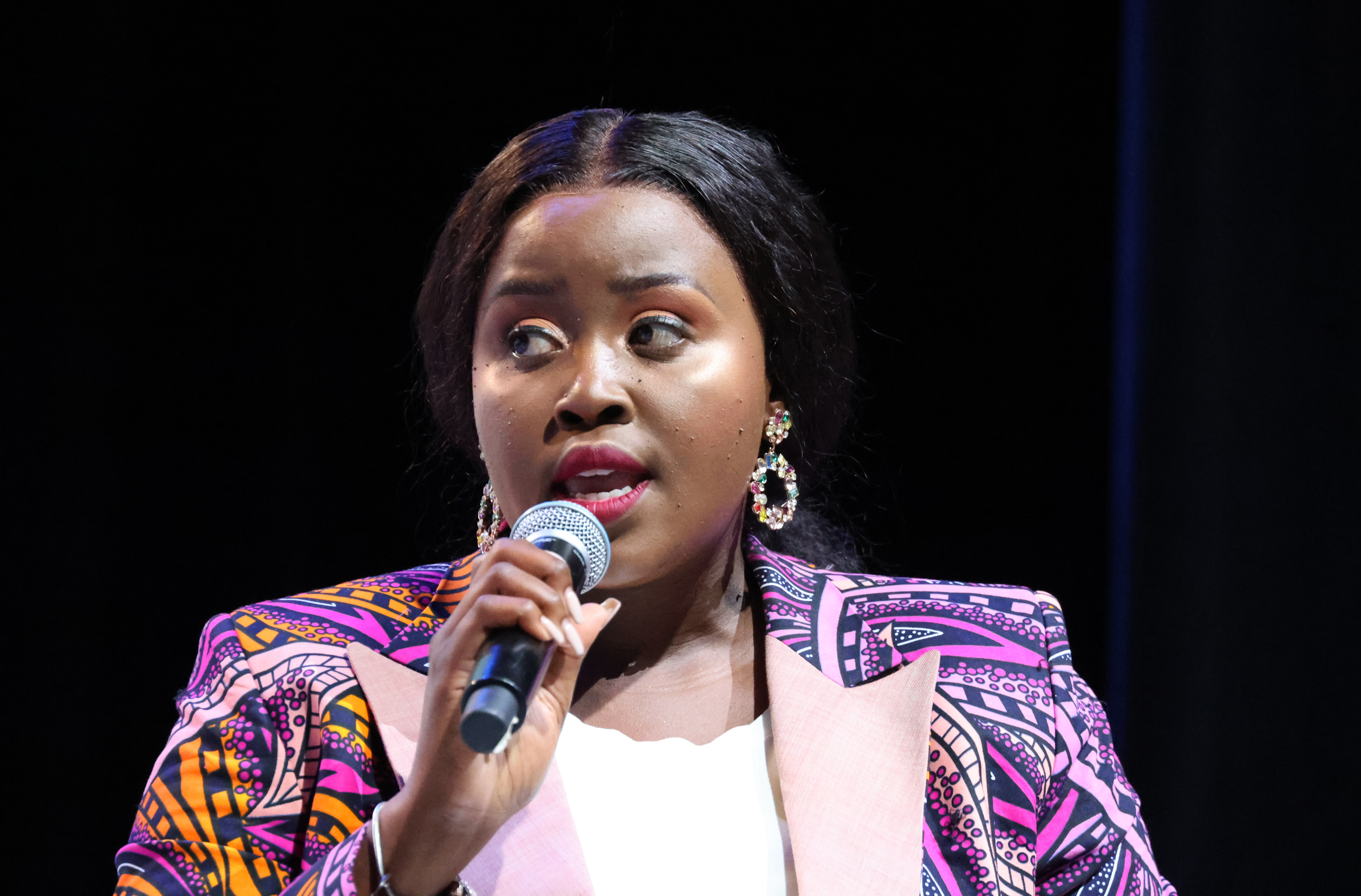
- 2023 Nelson Mandela Annual Lecture

Member of the National Assembly of South Africa
- In office 22 May 2019 – 28 May 2024

Personal details
- Born: Nompendulo Thobile Mkhatshwa; 20 August 1993 (age 33)
- Party: African National Congress
- Education: University of the Witwatersrand (BSc)
- Profession: Politician

Nompendulo Thobile Mkhatshwa (born 20 August 1993) is a South African politician, former student leader and former #FeesMustFall activist who served as a Member of the National Assembly of South Africa for the African National Congress (ANC).

In August 2021 she was elected chairperson of the Portfolio Committee on Higher Education, Science and Technology.

== Early life and education ==
Mkhatshwa was born on 20 August 1993. She has two younger sisters, Sthembiso and Nanziwe. In 2015, she graduated from the University of the Witwatersrand with a Bachelor of Science (BSc) in geography. She is currently enrolled for a post-graduate certificate in education from the University of South Africa.

== Political career ==
Mkhatshwa became involved in student politics while a student at the University of the Witwatersrand. In 2013, she was elected as the deputy chairperson of the South African Students Congress (SASCO) branch at Wits University. The following year, she was elected chairperson of the SASCO branch. Mkhatshwa became the deputy chairperson of the African National Congress Youth League branch at the university in 2015.

=== SRC presidency and #FeesMustFall activities ===
She was also elected president of the student representative council (SRC) that same year for 2015/2016. Mkhatshwa was one of the leaders of the #FeesMustFall movement at Wits and the subsequent national shutdown of South African universities. In October 2015, she and outgoing SRC president, Shaeera Kalla, led a march to the ANC’s Luthuli House headquarters in Johannesburg against fee increases. The day after the Luthuli House march, 20 000 students marched on the Union Buildings in Pretoria. Hours later, president Jacob Zuma announced that there would not be a fee increase for 2016.

Her leadership soon became controversial when she called for the national shutdown to end. The call was made by the Progressive Youth Alliance (PYA) of which she was a leader. It was rejected by Wits student because they wanted the university to employ all outsourced workers. There was then a stalemate between students. In December 2015, she appeared on the cover of the magazine Destiny wearing ANC regalia. This served to tarnish her credibility among students. She played a much more silent role for the remainder of her term. Mkhatshwa was a Wits representative at the fees commission and made appearances at local police stations and courts in Johannesburg to help secure the release of arrested students. She also negotiated with university management on the SRC's demand for free tertiary education.

=== Parliament ===
In 2019 she was elected to the National Assembly on the ANC national list. She was one of the youngest ANC MPs elected. She serves alongside other #FeesMustFall activists including Naledi Chirwa, Vuyani Pambo, and Peter Keetse, all from the Economic Freedom Fighters, an opposition party.

Mkhatshwa was a member of the National Assembly's Portfolio Committee on Higher Education, Science and Technology. She was also whip of the ANC's Study Group on Higher Education, Science and Technology.

On 26 August 2021 Mkhashwa was announced as the ANC's candidate to replace Philly Mapulane as Chair of the Portfolio Committee on Higher Education, Science and Technology. She was elected to the role on 31 August.

Mkhatshwa was ranked 152nd on the ANC's national list for the 2024 general election which was too low to secure re-election.
