= Michael Bond (South African politician) =

South African politician

Member of the National Assembly of South Africa
- In office 16 November 2022 – 28 May 2024
- Preceded by: Hlanganani Gumbi
- Constituency: KwaZulu-Natal List

Personal details
- Party: Democratic Alliance
- Profession: Politician

Michael Bond is a South African politician who served as a Member of the National Assembly of South Africa for the Democratic Alliance (DA) from 2022 to 2024.

== Political career ==
Bond was elected to the uMgungundlovu District Municipality council in 2000 as a member of the Democratic Alliance. In 2012, Bond stood for DA provincial leader against incumbent Sizwe Mchunu. Bond withdrew and endorsed Ziba Jiyane, who lost to Mchunu. In 2021, Bond was re-elected as a uMgungundlovu District Councillor and became the ward councillor for ward 25 in the Msunduzi Local Municipality as well.

On 9 November 2022, Bond vacated his position on the uMgungundlovu District Council after 22 years and resigned as the ward councillor for ward 25 in Msunduzi as well. He had been appointed a Member of Parliament for the DA with effect from 10 November. Bond was sworn in as a member of the National Assembly on 16 November 2022.

Bond was appointed an Additional Member on Defence and Military Veterans on 21 April 2023.

Bond was not reelected to Parliament at the 2024 elections.
