= Cristopher Nakampe Malematja =

South African politician

Cristopher Nakampe Malematja MP

Member of the National Assembly of South Africa
- Incumbent
- Assumed office 9 February 2022
- Preceded by: Duma Nkosi
- Constituency: Gauteng

Personal details
- Born: Cristopher Nakampe Malematja
- Party: African National Congress
- Committees: Portfolio Committee on Trade and Industry

Cristopher Nakampe Malematja is a South African politician who has been an African National Congress Member of the National Assembly of South Africa since February 2022. He is the current chairperson of the South African National Civic Organization (SANCO) in Gauteng.

Since becoming an MP, Malematja has been a member of the Portfolio Committee on Trade and Industry.
