= Judy Hermans =

South African politician

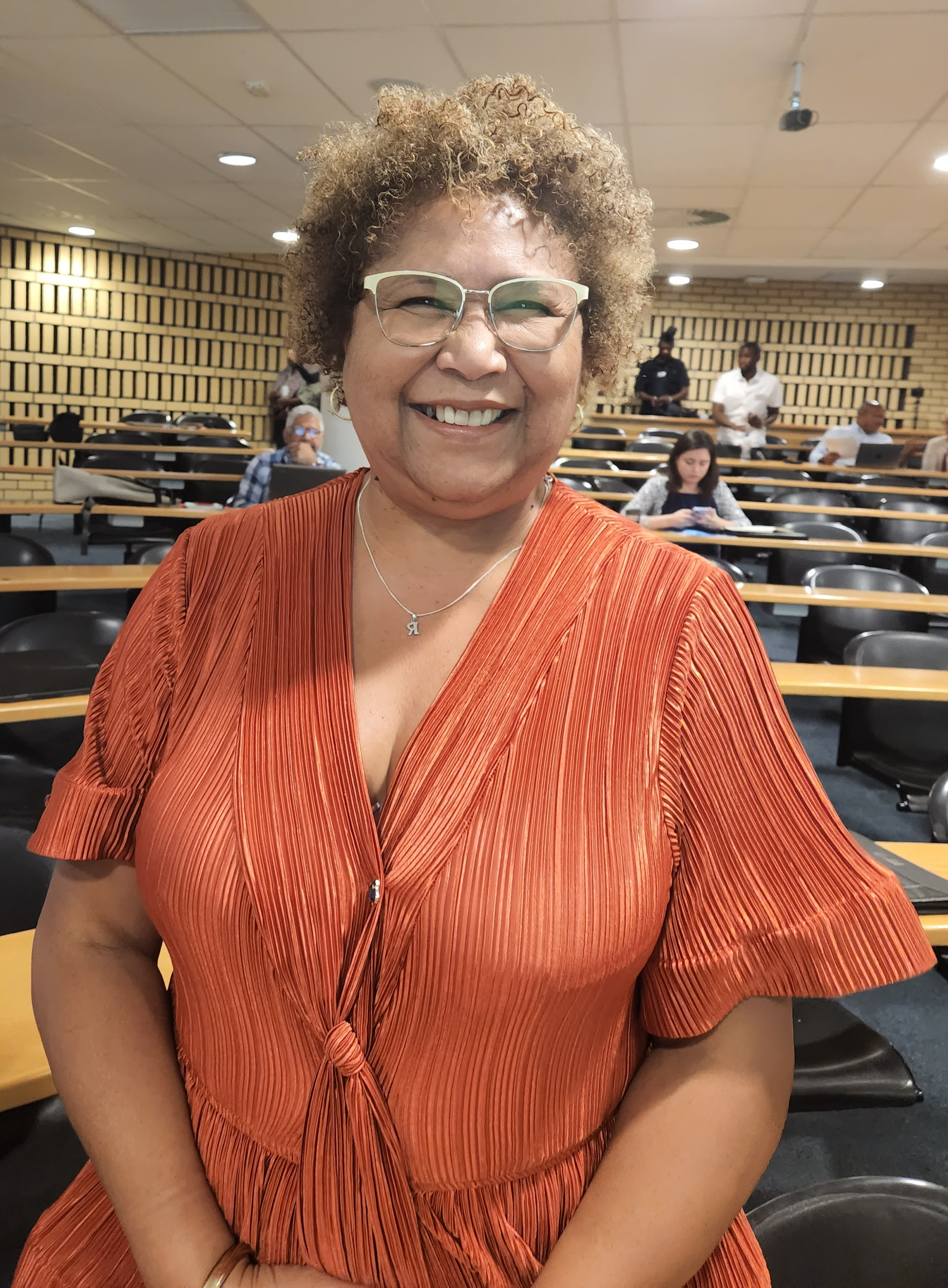
- Judy Hermans at the University of Cape Town in 2023

Member of the National Assembly of South Africa
- In office 10 June 2019 – 28 May 2024
- Preceded by: Tokozile Xasa

Personal details
- Born: Judy Hermans
- Party: African National Congress
- Profession: Politician

Judy Hermans is a South African politician from the Western Cape who served as a Member of the National Assembly from June 2019 until May 2024. Hermans is a member of the African National Congress.

== Parliamentary career ==
Hermans was given the 113th position on the national-to-national list of the African National Congress for the 2019 general election. She was not elected.

Hermans entered the National Assembly on 10 June 2019 as a replacement for former cabinet minister Tokozile Xasa, who had resigned.

She did not return to parliament following the 2024 election.

=== Committee assignment ===
- Portfolio Committee On Trade and Industry
- Committee for Section 194 Enquiry
