= Anthea Ramolobeng =

South African politician

Anthea Ramolobeng MP

Member of Parliament from Gauteng
- Incumbent
- Assumed office 22 May 2019

Personal details
- Party: ANC

Anthea Ramolobeng is a South African politician who has been a Member of Parliament (MP) for the African National Congress.

She is a member of the Portfolio Committee on Correctional Services.
