= Jeanine Nothnagel =

South African politician

Member of the National Assembly of South Africa
- In office 26 April 2022 – 28 May 2024
- Preceded by: Ayanda Dlodlo

Personal details
- Born: 26 April 1963 (age 63)
- Party: Democratic Alliance (2026–present)
- Other political affiliations: African National Congress (Until 2024)
- Education: Central University of Technology (DBA)

Jeanine Nothnagel (born 26 April 1963) is a South African politician who served as a Member of the National Assembly of South Africa from April 2022 until May 2024, representing the African National Congress.

In 2026, Nothnagel was elected as the ward councillor for Ward 19 of the Mangaung Metropolitan Municipality as a member of the Democratic Alliance.

== Education ==
Nothnagel holds a Doctor of Business Administration (DBA) from the Central University of Technology in Bloemfontein, Free State.

== Political career ==
Nothnagel was elected as an ANC councillor in the Mangaung Metropolitan Municipality in 2006. From 2016 to 2021, she served as a member of the mayoral committee (MMC). On her 59th birthday, Nothnagel was sworn in as a Member of Parliament for the ANC.

She was not included on any ANC parliamentary list for the 2024 general election and left parliament.

In November 2024, Nothnagel was shortlisted and interviewed by the National Assembly's Portfolio Committee on Justice and Constitutional Development for a vacancy on the South African Human Rights Commission. During the interview, she was asked if she was still a member of the ANC, her opinion on racism on farms, and if she knew what zama zamas were.

Nothnagel later joined the Democratic Alliance and stood as the party's candidate in Ward 19 of the Mangaung Municipality in the 2026 local government election. The initial count showed that the ANC had won the ward by two votes; however, following a recount, Nothnagel won the ward by 39 votes.
