= Ntaoleng Peacock =

South African politician

Member of the National Assembly of South Africa
- In office 22 May 2019 – 28 May 2024

Personal details
- Born: 2 February 1978 (age 48)
- Party: African National Congress
- Occupation: Member of Parliament
- Profession: Politician

Ntaoleng Patricia Peacock (born 2 February 1978) is a South African politician who served as a Member of the National Assembly from 2019 until 2024. Peacock is a member of the African National Congress.

== Parliamentary career ==
Peacock is a member of the African National Congress. She was selected to represent the party in the National Assembly of South Africa following the general election held on 8 May 2019. She was sworn in as a Member of Parliament on 22 May 2019. On 27 June, she received her committee assignment.

=== Committee membership ===
- Portfolio Committee on Police
