= Mike Basopu =

South African politician

Mike Basopu is a South African politician. He was a Member of Parliament from the African National Congress from 24 November 2021 until his resignation on 27 February 2023 to make way for Finance Minister Enoch Godongwana to be sworn in.

== See also ==
- Politics of South Africa
