= Nombulelo Hermans =

South African politician (1970–2021)

Nombulelo Hermans MP

Member of the National Assembly of South Africa
- In office 13 June 2019 – 18 January 2021
- Succeeded by: Ponani Makhubele-Marilele

Personal details
- Born: 1 January 1970 South Africa
- Died: 18 January 2021 (aged 51) South Africa
- Party: African National Congress
- Profession: Politician

Nombulelo Lilian Hermans (1 January 1970 - 18 January 2021) was a South African politician of the African National Congress who served as a Member of the National Assembly of South Africa from 2019 until her death in 2021.

== Political career ==
In 1985, Hermans joined the Colesberg Youth Organisation. After apartheid, she was involved with the establishment of the African National Congress branch in Colesberg. Hermans was elected to the ANC's Pixley ka Seme regional executive committee in 2002 and served on the regional working committee. Hermans was later elected as ANC regional treasurer before becoming regional deputy chairperson. She also served on the provincial executive committee and the provincial working committee of the ANC in the Northern Cape.

Hermans was Executive Mayor of the Umsobomvu Local Municipality (seat: Colesberg) for two terms and was speaker of the Pixley ka Seme District Municipality. She also served as the second deputy chairperson of the South African Local Government Association.

== Parliamentary career ==
Hermans was placed 111th on the party's national list for the 8 May 2019 general election; this was not high enough for her to win a seat in the National Assembly at the election as the ANC won 108 seats from the national list, however, Sylvia Lucas declined her seat and the ANC chose Hermans as her replacement. She was sworn in on 13 June 2019, just over a month after the election.

On 27 June 2019, Hermans was named to the Portfolio Committee on Employment and Labour. She became a member of the Joint Standing Committee on Intelligence in October 2019.

== Death ==
Hermans died from COVID-19 complications on 18 January 2021, during the COVID-19 pandemic in South Africa.

== See also ==
- List of members of the National Assembly of South Africa who died in office
