= Lotus River =

- Interactive map of Lotus River
- Coordinates: 34.036°S 18.513°E
- Country: South Africa
- Province: Western Cape
- Municipality: City of Cape Town

Area
  - Total: 5.01 km^{2} (1.93 sq mi)
- Elevation: 11 m (36 ft)

Population (2011)
  - Total: 38,143
  - Density: 7,610/km^{2} (19,700/sq mi)

Racial makeup (2011)
  - Black African: 3.67%
  - Coloured: 92.60%
  - Indian/Asian: 0.79%
  - White: 0.31%
  - Other: 2.63%

First languages (2011)
  - English: 53.73%
  - Afrikaans: 44.04%
  - Other: 2.23%
- Time zone: UTC+2 (SAST)
- Postal code (street): 7941
- PO box: 7805

Lotus River is a suburb of Cape Town in South Africa. Lotus River is found at an elevation of 11 metres (36 feet) above sea level.

== Demographics ==
The total population of Lotus River as of a 1996 census which was compiled by the Urban Policy Unit was 18,123. Of that number 8,775 were male and 9,348 were female. The smallest ethnic group represented were white, with only 38 in the entire enclave. African Blacks were also in scarcity, with a total of only 212. The vast majority were given the designation of coloured, with 16,115 in this category. The remaining population were either Indian/Asian, with 289 or unspecified, with 1,469.

Lotus River has an exceedingly young population. There were a total of 5,140 residents between the ages of 0 and 14, and a total of 6,729 from age 15 to 34. The number of people between the ages of 35 and 54 was 3,986, while those from 55 to 64 numbered 1,193. There were 912 residents over 65, and an additional 163 of an unspecified age.

Only two major languages were spoken in Lotus River, English and Afrikaans. Those speaking English were 8,491 and those speaking Afrikaans were 9,460. The rest either spoke and unspecified language (142) or Xhosa (14) with 16 speaking some other language.

== Education ==
There were 1,293 listed with no schooling, while an additional 797 were listed with an unspecified educational level. Children attending school until Grade 2 numbered 555, and between Grades 3 and 7 the numbers were 4,067. Children in Grades 8-11 totalled 6,707, and those with just a high school matriculation amounted to 2,143. The number of residents with a high school diploma plus a certificate numbered 602, and those with a higher degree numbered 210. There were 39 people with a postgraduate degree, and 26 with some other qualification.
