= Sharome van Schalkwyk =

South African politician

Member of the National Assembly of South Africa
- In office 5 July 2019 – 28 May 2024
- In office 21 May 2014 – 7 May 2019

Personal details
- Born: Sharome Renay Van Schalkwyk
- Party: African National Congress (ANC)
- Occupation: Politician

Sharome Renay van Schalkwyk is a South African politician and a former Member of Parliament for the African National Congress.

== Parliamentary career ==
Van Schalkwyk was placed fourth on the African National Congress's regional Northern Cape list for the general election on 8 May 2014. After the election, she was nominated to the National Assembly of South Africa. Van Schalkwyk was sworn in as a Member of Parliament on 21 May 2014. In June 2014, she became a member of the Portfolio Committee on Labour.

Van Schalkwyk became a member of the Portfolio Committee on Communications on 28 May 2015. She served on the committee until 20 October 2016, when she became a member of the Portfolio Committee on Trade and Industry. She was appointed as the whip for the ANC Study Group on Public Service and Administration in 2018.

Van Schalkwyk stood unsuccessfully for re-election at the May 2019 general election due to the fact that her name was low on the ANC's national list. However, Collen Maine resigned from parliament on 5 July 2019 and the ANC selected Van Schalkwyk to fill his seat. She was sworn in as an MP on the same day. On 19 July, Van Schalkwyk became a member of the Portfolio Committee on Public Works and Infrastructure. She became a member of the Standing Committee on Auditor General on 20 August 2019.

She did not stand in the 2024 general election and left parliament.
