= Wendy Alexander (South African politician) =

South African politician (born 1979)

Wendy Alexander MP

Member of the National Assembly of South Africa
- Incumbent
- Assumed office 16 November 2022
- Preceded by: Jacques Julius
- Constituency: Gauteng

Personal details
- Born: Wendy Robyn Alexander; 25 June 1979 (age 47)
- Party: Democratic Alliance
- Education: University of Pretoria
- Profession: Politician

Wendy Robyn Alexander (born 25 June 1979) is a South African politician who has been a Democratic Alliance Member of the National Assembly of South Africa since November 2022.

== Education and career ==
Alexander has an honours degree in therapeutic recreation from the University of Pretoria. She has also completed a course through the Wits School of Governance in Leadership in Local Government. Prior to becoming active in politics, Alexander had worked in the marketing and brand activation space for over a decade.

== Political career ==
Alexander became a member of the Democratic Alliance and stood as the DA's ward councillor candidate in ward 134 in the City of Johannesburg Metropolitan Municipality in 2016. The ward included parts of Northriding, Northgate, parts of Boskruin, Randpark Ridge and Sundowner. Alexander won and became the councillor for the ward. She was appointed deputy chairperson of the Johannesburg Regional Selection Panel and the chairperson of the Political Support Cluster of the DA's caucus in council. In 2018, Alexander was nominated to be the DA's candidate for Gauteng premier. Tshwane mayor Solly Msimanga was ultimately selected to be the party's premier candidate.

In April 2020, Alexander was appointed chief whip of the DA's caucus in the Johannesburg City Council. In 2021, the DA's Devon Steenkamp was elected to succeed her as ward councillor for ward 134 as Alexander was re-elected to council through the DA's PR List. Tyrell Meyers, also from the DA, replaced Alexander as the DA's caucus chief whip and also became the Chief Whip of the Council. On 28 January 2022, Alexander was elected chairperson of the council's Section 79 committee on Transport. She was removed as committee chairperson in October 2022.

On 16 November 2022, Alexander became a Member of the National Assembly of South Africa for the DA. She was appointed an Additional Member on the Standing Committee on Finance by DA leader John Steenhuisen on 21 April 2023. Alexander was elected to a full term in the 2024 general election.
