= Hlanganani Gumbi =

South African politician (born 1989)

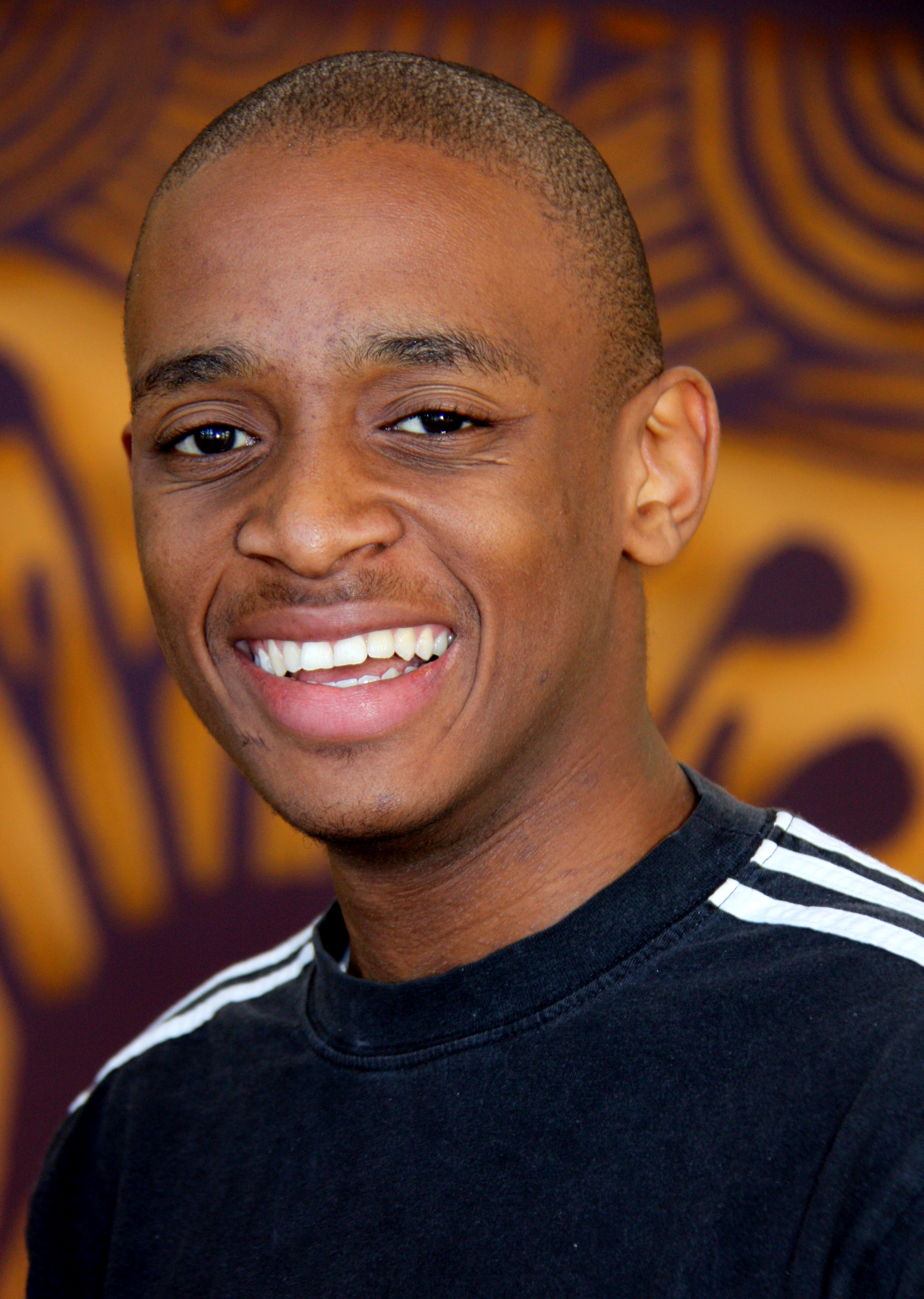
- Gumbi in 2010

Member of the KwaZulu-Natal Legislature
- In office 3 November 2022 – 29 August 2023
- In office 21 May 2014 – 7 May 2019

Member of the National Assembly of South Africa
- In office 22 May 2019 – 3 November 2022
- Succeeded by: Michael Bond

Personal details
- Born: Hlanganani Siphelele Gumbi; 18 December 1989 (age 36)
- Party: Democratic Alliance
- Profession: Politician

Hlanganani Siphelele Gumbi (born 18 December 1989) is a South African politician. A member of the Democratic Alliance, Gumbi was elected to the eThekwini city council in 2011. In 2014, he was elected to the KwaZulu-Natal Legislature. Gumbi became a member of the National Assembly of South Africa following the 2019 general election. He was appointed Shadow Deputy Minister of Tourism. In 2022, he resigned from the National Assembly to return to the KwaZulu-Natal Legislature. He was then appointed as the DA KZN Spokesperson on Agriculture and Rural Development.

In late-August 2023, Gumbi announced his resignation as a Member of the Provincial Legislature after he received a Chevening Scholarship to study a Master of Science in Entrepreneurship and Innovation Management at the University of Liverpool in England.
