= Nkosinathi Dlamini =

South African politician

Nkosinathi Dlamini MP

Member of Parliament from KwaZulu-Natal
- Incumbent
- Assumed office 2021

Personal details
- Party: ANC

Nkosinathi Emmanuel Dlamini is a South African politician who has been a Member of Parliament (MP) for the African National Congress.
