= Pretty Xaba-Ntshaba =

South African politician

Phindisile Xaba-Ntshaba MP

Member of the National Assembly of South Africa
- Incumbent
- Assumed office 22 May 2019

Personal details
- Party: African National Congress

Phindisile Pretty Xaba-Ntshaba is a South African politician who was elected to the National Assembly of South Africa in the 2019 general election as a member of the African National Congress. She previously served in the assembly from 2009 to 2014.

Since becoming an MP, Xaba-Ntshaba has served on the Portfolio Committee on Cooperative Governance and Traditional Affairs.
