= Xiaomei Havard =

Chinese-born South African businesswoman and politician

- Chinese: 张晓梅

Member of the National Assembly of South Africa
- In office 27 January 2021 – 28 May 2024
- Preceded by: Jackson Mthembu

Personal details
- Born: 1965 or 1966 (age 60–61) Nanyang, Henan, China
- Party: African National Congress
- Education: University of Johannesburg (PhD)
- Occupation: Member of Parliament

Xiaomei Havard (Chinese: 张晓梅; pinyin: Zhāng Xiǎoméi) is a Chinese-born South African businesswoman and politician from Gauteng who served as a Member of Parliament for the African National Congress.

== Early life and education ==
Havard was born in Nanyang, Henan, China. Her parents were teachers and she grew up in a rural village. She moved to Gauteng in 1994 to study for a computer science doctorate and later became a naturalized citizen. She holds a doctorate in computer science from the University of Johannesburg and a master's degree in electrical engineering from a Chinese university. She married a South African, who died before 2021.

== Political career ==
Havard joined the African National Congress in 2004. Havard is also the honourable president of the Africa Federation of Chinese Women in Commerce and Industry and the co-president of the South Africa-China Famous Female Business Council.

In May 2019, she stood for election to the South African National Assembly as 130th on the ANC's national list. Due to the ANC's electoral performance, she did not win a seat in parliament. It was later revealed that she was one of 23 MP candidates that the ANC's integrity committee wanted to remove from the party's lists because of "corruption, mismanagement, and other acts of misconduct."

=== Parliament ===
Following the death of the Minister in the Presidency, Jackson Mthembu, on 21 January 2021, the ANC selected Havard to fill his seat in the National Assembly. She was sworn in on 27 January. After her swearing-in, xenophobic hashtags trended on Twitter. Havard serves on the Portfolio Committee on Health.

On 3 September 2021, she directed her first parliamentary question to President Cyril Ramaphosa, asking him about the slow vaccination rate and what the government was doing to put an end to vaccination fears and encourage citizens to vaccinate.

== Allegations of espionage ==
She has been a member of and held leadership positions in multiple Chinese business and BRICS forums affiliated with the United Front Work Department of the Chinese Communist Party (CCP).

In September 2021, it was reported that a leaked counter-intelligence report, prepared by the State Security Agency, judged with "high likelihood" that Havard has been sharing classified information with the CCP. Both Xiaomei and Zizi Kodwa, Deputy Minister in the Presidency for State Security, denied the reports. The Chief Whip of the ANC, Pemmy Majodina, said that her office does not receive intelligence reports and so could not comment further. The Democratic Alliance demanded that President Cyril Ramaphosa should publish the report. A commentary in the Daily Maverick questioned the reports, because "if Xiaomei Havard has indeed been sent into the ANC parliamentary caucus to spy for the Chinese government, she seems a very silly choice" due to her lack of connections with other MPs and poor English.
