= Elvis Siwela =

South African politician

Member of the National Assembly of South Africa
- In office 22 May 2019 – 1 April 2023
- Succeeded by: Lydia Moroane
- Constituency: Mpumalanga
- In office 21 May 2014 – 20 September 2017
- Succeeded by: Gijimani Skosana
- Constituency: Mpumalanga

Personal details
- Born: Elvis Kholwana Siwela
- Party: African National Congress
- Education: Regenesys Business School
- Profession: Politician

Elvis Kholwana Siwela is a South African politician who was an African National Congress Member of the National Assembly of South Africa from 2014 to 2017 and again from 2019 until 2023.

== Background ==
Siwela earned a master's degree in Public Management from Regenesys Business School. He served on the provincial executive committee (PEC) of the African National Congress in Mpumalanga.

== Parliamentary career ==
In 2014 he was elected to the National Assembly of South Africa from the ANC's Mpumalanga list. Siwela was appointed to serve on the Portfolio Committee on Telecommunications and Postal Services and the Portfolio Committee on Higher Education and Training. In September 2017, he resigned from the National Assembly.

Siwela was elected back to the National Assembly in the May 8, 2019 general election. He was then appointed to the Portfolio Committee on Basic Education. In October 2019, he questioned whether the grade 9 certificate should be issued to all pupils and at what cost. In August 2021, he became a member of the Portfolio Committee on Health.

Siwela resigned from Parliament with effect from 1 April 2023.
