= Thembani Makata =

South African politician (b. 1985)

Member of the National Assembly of South Africa
- In office 17 October 2023 – 28 May 2024
- Preceded by: Tyotyo James

Personal details
- Born: 1985 (age 40–41) Mount Frere, Cape Province, South Africa
- Party: African National Congress

Thembani Zimasa Makata (born 1985) is a South African politician who served as a Member of the National Assembly of South Africa from 2023 until 2024, representing the African National Congress. Makata is a former student activist and former secretary-general of the South African Students Congress.

== Biography ==
Makata was born in 1985 in Mount Frere in what is now the Eastern Cape Province of South Africa. She enrolled for a Bachelor of Commerce in Human Resources at the University of Fort Hare. While a student at Fort Hare, she served as the provincial secretary of the South African Students Congress. She was also a member of the regional executive committee of the African National Congress Youth League in Buffalo City.

In December 2015, Makata was elected national secretary-general of the South African Students Congress. She was completing her BCom Human Resources degree at University of South Africa at the time. In February 2017, Makata claimed that the National Student Financial Aid Scheme system had collapsed numerous times, leaving students stranded about their funding applications, as SASCO threatened nationwide protest action.

Makata was sworn in as an ANC Member of the National Assembly of South Africa on 17 October 2023, filling the casual vacancy that arose when Tyotyo James lost his parliamentary membership for not attending parliamentary meetings.

Makata was not an ANC parliamentary candidate for the 2024 general elections and left parliament.
