= Phindavele Mlungisi Sikosana =

South African politician

Member of the National Assembly of South Africa
- In office 24 April 2024 – 28 May 2024
- Preceded by: Mzwakhe Sibisi
- Constituency: KwaZulu-Natal

Personal details
- Party: National Freedom Party

Phindavele Mlungisi Sikosana is a South African politician who served as a Member of the National Assembly of South Africa in 2024, representing the National Freedom Party.

== Political career ==
Sikosana stood as the National Freedom Party's candidate in a municipal by-election in the UPhongolo Local Municipality on 14 June 2017. The African National Congress won the by-election and retained the ward.

Sikosana was sworn in as a Member of the National Assembly of South Africa on 24 April 2024; he filled the casual vacancy that arose from the death of NFP MP Mzwakhe Sibisi.

Sikosana was not included on any NFP candidate lists for the 2024 general election and left parliament as a result.
