= Sindiswa Maneli =

South African politician

Member of the National Assembly of South Africa
- In office 7 December 2021 – 28 May 2024
- Preceded by: Thanduxolo Khalipha
- Constituency: Free State

Personal details
- Born: Sindiswa Thelmonia Maneli
- Party: African National Congress
- Profession: Politician

Sindiswa Thelmonia Maneli is a South African politician who served as an African National Congress Member of the National Assembly of South Africa from December 2021 until May 2024.

During her term in parliament, she served on the Portfolio Committee on Public Service and Administration and the Portfolio Committee on Tourism.

Maneli did not stand in the 2024 general election.
