= Stephen Moore (South African politician) =

South African politician

Stephen Moore MP

Member of the National Assembly of South Africa
- Incumbent
- Assumed office 15 May 2023
- Preceded by: Cilliers Brink
- Constituency: National List

Personal details
- Born: Stephen James Moore; 18 September 1983 (age 42)
- Party: Democratic Alliance
- Profession: Politician

Stephen James Moore (born 18 September 1983) is a South African politician who has been a Member of the National Assembly of South Africa since May 2023, representing the Democratic Alliance. He succeeded Cilliers Brink, who resigned to become mayor of Tshwane. He had previously served as the ward councillor for ward 106 in the City of Johannesburg Metropolitan Municipality from 2011 to 2016.
