= Nozipho Tyobeka-Makeke =

South African politician

Member of the National Assembly of South Africa
- In office 16 March 2023 – 28 May 2024
- Preceded by: Lindiwe Sisulu

Personal details
- Party: African National Congress
- Profession: Politician

Nozipho Paulina Tyobeka-Makeke is a South African politician who served as a member of the National Assembly of South Africa from March 2023 until May 2024, representing the African National Congress. She had previously been a member of the mayoral committee (MMC) of the City of Tshwane responsible for sports and recreation in the municipality.

Tyobeka-Makeke stood for the National Assembly in the 2019 general election as 147th on the ANC's national list, but was not elected due to the ANC's electoral performance. Nearly four years after the election, Tyobeka-Makeke entered the National Assembly to fill the casual vacancy created by the resignation of Lindiwe Sisulu.
