= Mthenjwa Zondi =

South African politician

Member of the National Assembly of South Africa
- In office 31 August 2020 – 28 May 2024
- Preceded by: Dorah Dunana Dlamini

Member of the KwaZulu-Natal Legislature
- In office 21 May 2014 – 7 May 2019

Personal details
- Born: Mthenjwa Amon Zondi; 24 December 1966 (age 59)
- Party: African National Congress
- Profession: Politician

Mthenjwa Amon Zondi (born 24 December 1966) is a South African politician whoserved in the National Assembly from 2020 until 2024. Prior to serving in parliament, he served as a member of the KwaZulu-Natal Legislature from 2014 to 2019. Zondi is a member of the African National Congress.

== Political career ==
In 2014 Zondi stood for election to the KwaZulu-Natal Legislature as 51st on the African National Congress's provincial legislature list. He was elected and sworn in on 21 May 2014.

In 2019 he stood for re-election at 50th. The ANC won only 44 seats in the provincial legislature and Zondi was not elected to return to the legislature.

On 31 August 2020, Zondi was sworn in as a member of the National Assembly of South Africa, replacing Dorah Dunana Dlamini, who died in June. From 8 October 2020 onwards, he served as a member of the Portfolio Committee on Sports, Arts and Culture. Zondi did not stand in the 2024 general election and left parliament.
