= Gizella Opperman =

Member of Parliament of South Africa

Gizella Opperman MP

Member of the National Assembly of South Africa
- Incumbent
- Assumed office 22 May 2019

Personal details
- Party: Democratic Alliance

Gizella Opperman (née Hartnick; born 24 July 1980) is a South African politician from the Northern Cape serving as a Member of the National Assembly of South Africa since 2019. Opperman is a party member of the Democratic Alliance (DA).

== Political career ==
In 2011, Opperman was elected as a councillor of the Hantam Local Municipality. She was elected as the deputy provincial chairperson of the Democratic Alliance Women's Network in September 2015. She is currently the provincial chairperson.

Opperman was the first candidate on the DA's Northern Cape list of candidates for the general election on 8 May 2019. She was elected to the National Assembly at the election and was sworn in as a Member of Parliament on 22 May 2019. She became a member of the Portfolio Committee on Cooperative Governance and Traditional Affairs (CoGTA) in June of the same year.

In 2020, Opperman declared her candidacy for provincial chairperson of the Democratic Alliance. The provincial congress was held on 5 December 2020. She lost to Isak Fritz.
