= Ponani Makhubele-Marilele =

South African politician

Ponani Petunia Makhubela-Marilele

Member of the National Assembly of South Africa
- In office 27 January 2021 – 28 May 2024
- Preceded by: Nombulelo Hermans
- Constituency: National List

Personal details
- Born: Ponani Petunia Makhubele; 1979 or 1980 (age 46–47) Giyani, South Africa
- Children: 3
- Profession: Politician

Ponani Petunia Makhubele-Marilele (née Makhubele; born 1979 or 1980) is a South African politician who served as a Member of the National Assembly of South Africa until May 2024, representing the African National Congress.

Makhubele-Marilele defected to Umkhonto weSizwe in September 2024.
