= Mandla Rayi =

South African politician

Mandla Rayi MP

Permanent Delegate to the National Council of Provinces
- Incumbent
- Assumed office 22 May 2014

Personal details
- Born: 1959 (age 66–67)
- Party: African National Congress
- Other political affiliations: Congress of South African Trade Unions

Mandla Isaac Rayi (born 1959) is a South African politician who has served in the National Council of Provinces as a permanent delegate representing the African National Congress from the Eastern Cape since 2014. As of June 2019, he is the chairperson of the Select Committee on Trade and Industry, Economic Development, Small Business Development, Tourism, Employment and Labour.

== Background ==
Rayi had previously served as the provincial secretary of the Congress of South African Trade Unions in the Eastern Cape as well as the provincial secretary for the Chemical, Energy, Paper, Printing, Wood and Allied Workers' Union in the same province.

== Parliamentary career ==
=== First term: 2014–2019 ===
After the 2014 general election, Ray was elected to represent the African National Congress in the National Council of Provinces as a permanent delegate from the Eastern Cape.

From June 2014 to 18 August 2016, Rayi served as an alternate member of the Select Committee on Land and Mineral Resources, the Select Committee on Communications and Public Enterprises and the Select Committee on Trade and International Relations. From 18 August 2016 onwards, he was a member of the Select Committee on Economic and Business Development. He was also an alternate member of the Select Committee on Communications and Public Enterprises and the Select Committee on Land and Mineral Resources from March to May 2019.

=== Second term: 2019–present ===
Rayi returned to the NCOP after the 2019 general election, and was selected to chair the Select Committee on Trade & Industry, Economic Development, Small Business Development, Tourism, Employment & Labour. In addition to serving as committee chair, he also serves on the Joint Committee on Ethics and Members Interests, the Joint Standing Committee on Financial Management of Parliament, the Select Committee on Appropriations, the Select Committee on Finance, and the Select Committee on Transport, Public Service and Administration, Public Works and Infrastructure.

In September 2019, Rayi condemned attacks on truck drivers and said: "This is not only a crime against truck drivers, but also against the economy, at a time when faster and rapid growth is required. It is critical that law enforcement work hard to find the culprits and act accordingly to stop this thuggish behaviour." In July 2022, Rayi lauded president Cyril Ramaphosa's plans to stabilise electricity generation in South Africa.
