= Altia Sthembile Hlongo =

South African politician

Altia Sthembile Hlongo MP

Member of Parliament from Mpumalanga
- Incumbent
- Assumed office 22 May 2019

Personal details
- Party: ANC

Altia Sthembile Hlongo is a South African politician who has been a Member of Parliament (MP) for the African National Congress.
