= Mathibe Mohlala =

South African politician

Mathibe Mohlala MP

Member of the National Assembly of South Africa
- Incumbent
- Assumed office 22 May 2019

Personal details
- Party: Economic Freedom Fighters
- Profession: Politician

Mathibe Rebecca Mohlala is a South African politician. She was elected as a Member of Parliament in the National Assembly for the Economic Freedom Fighters party in 2019.

Since becoming an MP, she has served on the Standing Committee on Finance.
