= Bheki Hadebe =

South African politician

Member of the National Assembly of South Africa
- In office 22 May 2019 – 28 May 2024

Personal details
- Born: Bheki Mathews Hadebe
- Party: African National Congress
- Occupation: Politician

Bheki Mathews Hadebe is a South African politician from the Western Cape who served as a Member of the National Assembly of South Africa from 2019 until 2024. Hadebe is a member of the African National Congress.

== Parliamentarian (2019–present) ==
Hadebe was ranked 6th on the ANC's list of Western Cape parliamentary candidates for the general election on 8 May 2019. After the election, he was announced as an incoming Member of the National Assembly. He was sworn into office on 22 May 2019.

In parliament, Hadebe was a member of the Standing Committee on Public Accounts (SCOPA) and the Portfolio Committee on Cooperative Governance and Traditional Affairs. He was appointed to both committees in June 2019.

Hadebe did not return to parliament following the 2024 general election.
