= Gobonamang Prudence Marekwa =

South African politician

Member of the National Assembly of South Africa
- In office 24 November 2021 – 28 May 2024
- Preceded by: Kebby Maphatsoe

Personal details
- Born: Kimberley, South Africa
- Party: African National Congress

Gobonamang Prudence Marekwa is a South African politician, trade unionist and police officer who served as a Member of the National Assembly of South Africa from November 2021 until May 2024, representing the African National Congress.

== Early life and education ==
Marekwa was born in Kimberley. She has a diploma in education as well as certificates in economic development and personnel and training management. She also holds an advanced diploma in public administration and went on to study for a bachelor's degree in business administration.

== Career ==
Marekwa joined her local South African Police Service (SAPS) station in 1991. She completed her training in Hammanskraal in June 1992 and began working for the Kimberley police station. In 1993, she joined the Police and Prisons Civil Rights Union (POPCRU). She became a shop steward for the union two years later. She was elected deputy secretary for the former Diamond Field Branch in 1996. Marekwa became deputy secretary of the provincial interim gender structure in 1997. She served as deputy secretary of the Kimberley branch for two years from 1997 to 1999, before she was elected as branch secretary, a position she held until 2001. In 2001, she was deputy provincial secretary of POPCRU.

Marekwa was elected treasurer of the Congress of South African Trade Unions' (COSATU) Northern Cape and Free State region in 2001 and served in the position until 2008. She also served as the acting provincial secretary of POPCRU in the Northern Cape twice, in 2004 and from December 2005 until October 2007. When COSATU's Northern Cape structure was established in 2008, she was elected provincial treasurer. She currently serves as the second deputy president of POPCRU.

== Parliamentary career ==
Marekwa became a Member of the National Assembly of South Africa for the African National Congress in November 2021. Marekwa did not stand in the 2024 general election.
