= Virgill Gericke =

South African politician

Virgill Gericke MP

Permanent Delegate to the National Council of Provinces
- Incumbent
- Assumed office 15 June 2024

Member of the National Assembly of South Africa
- In office 20 October 2023 – 28 May 2024

President of the Plaaslike Besorgde Inwoners
- In office 2011 – 19 October 2023
- Preceded by: Party created
- Succeeded by: Roselien Titus (acting)

Personal details
- Party: Economic Freedom Fighters (2023–present)
- Other political affiliations: Plaaslike Besorgde Inwoners (2011–2023)

Virgill Gericke is a South African politician who has been a Permanent Delegate to the National Council of Provinces representing the Western Cape as a member of the Economic Freedom Fighters. Prior to serving in the NCOP, he was a Member of Parliament in the National Assembly. Gericke previously served as the founding president of the Plaaslike Besorgde Inwoners, a minor political party in the Garden Route District Municipality, from 2011 until 2023.

== Political career ==
Gericke founded the Plaaslike Besorgde Inwoners (English: Local Concerned Residents) in 2011. The party won one seat in the council of the George Local Municipality in the 2011 municipal elections, and Gericke was elected to take up the party's sole council seat. Gericke was re-elected to council in 2016. Following the election, he was elected to serve on the council of the Garden Route District Municipality. Gericke was re-elected to a third term on the George municipal council in 2021. Afterwards, he was re-elected to the Garden Route district council. He was fielded as a mayoral candidate, but lost to incumbent Memory Booysen of the Democratic Alliance, winning only 15 votes to Booysen's 18 out of 33 votes.

On 18 October 2023, Gericke resigned from the George municipal council and the Garden Route district council. He resigned from the PBI and joined the Economic Freedom Fighters party the following day. He was sworn in as a member of the National Assembly on 20 October. Gericke was appointed to the National Council of Provinces following the 2024 general election.
