= Zanele Nkomo =

South African politician

Member of the National Assembly of South Africa
- In office 19 June 2019 – 28 May 2024
- Preceded by: Bathabile Dlamini

Personal details
- Born: Zanele Nkomo
- Party: African National Congress
- Occupation: Member of Parliament
- Profession: Politician

Zanele Nkomo is a South African Member of Parliament for the African National Congress. She was appointed to Parliament in June 2019 after former minister Bathabile Dlamini had resigned her seat. Nkomo was a member of the Standing Committee on Finance and the Committee on Multi-Party Women's Caucus. She also served on the ANC's regional executive committee in Ekurhuleni.
