= Linda Moss =

South African politician

Linda Moss MP

Member of Parliament from Western Cape
- In office 2020 – 2 March 2023

Personal details
- Party: ANC

Linda Nellie Moss is a South African politician who served as a Member of Parliament (MP) for the African National Congress.

Moss resigned from the National Assembly with effect from 2 March 2023. Ebrahim Patel succeeded her.

== See also ==
- List of National Assembly members of the 27th Parliament of South Africa
