= Motalane Monakedi =

South African politician

Member of the National Assembly of South Africa
- In office 15 March 2023 – 28 May 2024
- Preceded by: Fikile Mbalula

Permanent Delegate to the National Council of Provinces
- In office 10 March 2017 – 7 May 2019

Executive Mayor of the Capricorn District Municipality
- In office 2000–2010

Provincial Treasurer of the African National Congress
- In office 2005–2008
- Preceded by: Thaba Mufamadi
- Succeeded by: Dipuo Letsatsi-Duba

Personal details
- Party: African National Congress
- Profession: Politician

Motalane Dewet Monakedi is a South African politician who served as a member of the National Assembly of South Africa from March 2023 until May 2024, representing the African National Congress. He previously served as a Permanent Delegate to the National Council of Provinces from March 2017 to May 2019. Monakedi served in the Limpopo Provincial Legislature from 1996 until 2000 and as the Executive Mayor of the Capricorn District Municipality between 2000 and 2010. Within the ANC in Limpopo, he served as provincial treasurer from 2005 until 2008.

== Early life and anti-apartheid activities ==
Monakedi is from the Ga-Mmela village in Limpopo. He attended high school in Jane Furse. In 1982, he started attending the University of Venda. In his second year at the university, he joined the Azanian Students' Organisation (AZASO). He formed part of the establishment of the Sekhukhune Youth Organisation which later fell under the banner of the United Democratic Front in 1985. He started working for the Detainees Support Committee in 1987. He was detained on 27 April 1987 and released on 6 March 1989, only to be restricted to the Sekhukhune area. Monakedi became a member of the Progressive Primary Healthcare Network (PPHN) in 1989. Between 1990 and 1995, he was a member of the Lawyers for Human Rights (LHR). He became the treasurer of the South African Youth Congress when it became the African National Congress Youth League in 1991.

== Political career ==
Monakedi was elected a regional chairperson for the African National Congress in Sekhukhune and appointed a commissioner to the Member of the Executive Council (MEC) for Constitutional Affairs, Saad Cachalia in 1995. The following year, he was elected to the party's Provincial Executive Council (PEC) in the Limpopo province. He was also sworn in as an ANC Member of the Limpopo Provincial Legislature in 1996. During his tenure in the provincial legislature, he served as Chair of Chairs.

In 2000, Monakedi was elected as the first executive mayor of the Capricorn District Municipality. He was elected provincial treasurer of the ANC branch in Limpopo in 2005. In 2008, he lost to Dickson Masemola in the election for deputy provincial chairperson at the ANC's provincial conference. He also did not gain election to the Provincial Executive Committee.

Monakedi resigned as district mayor in 2010 to become the chief executive officer (CEO) of Trade and Investments in Limpopo (TIL). The TIL and other entities later merged to form the Limpopo Economic Development Agency where Monakedi was the chief executive responsible for trade investments.

In 2014, Monakedi was elected Regional Chairperson of the ANC's Capricorn District. He would hold this position until 2018.

== Parliamentary career ==
=== NCOP Delegate: 2017–2019 ===
Monakedi became a Permanent Delegate to the National Council of Provinces in March 2017. By October 2017, he became the co-chairperson of the Joint Standing Committee on the Financial Management of Parliament.

Monakedi unsuccessfully stood for the South African National Assembly in the 2019 general election; he did not return to the NCOP.

=== Member of the National Assembly: 2023 ===
Monakedi was sworn in as a Member of the National Assembly on 15 March 2023. he did not stand for a full term in the 2024 general election.
