= Constance Mkhonto =

South African politician

Constance Mkhonto MP

Member of the National Assembly of South Africa
- Incumbent
- Assumed office 13 June 2020

Personal details
- Party: Economic Freedom Fighters
- Profession: Politician

Constance Nonhlanhla Mkhonto is a South African politician and Member of Parliament in the National Assembly for the Economic Freedom Fighters party.

== Career ==
Mkhonto had served as the executive mayor of the Ehlanzeni District Municipality in Mpumalanga and as a manager in Mpumalanga's House of Traditional Leaders. She was also a teacher.

She then became a member of the Economic Freedom Fighters party. In December 2019, Mkhonto was elected to the Central Command Team, its highest decision-making body, as an additional member.

Mkhonto entered the National Assembly on 13 June 2020. During a debate on farm murders in September 2020, she said that it could be a "scam" by right-wingers to deflect law enforcement's attention.
