= Noluvuyo Tafeni =

South African politician

Luvuyo Tafeni

Permanent Delegate to the National Council of Provinces from the Eastern Cape
- Incumbent
- Assumed office 13 June 2023

Member of the National Assembly of South Africa
- In office 25 October 2019 – 5 June 2023

Personal details
- Party: Economic Freedom Fighters
- Occupation: Member of Parliament
- Profession: Politician

Noluvuyo Tafeni, known as Luvuyo Tafeni, is a South African politician who has served as a Permanent Delegate to the National Council of Provinces since June 2023, representing the Eastern Cape. A member of the Economic Freedom Fighters party, she served as a Member of the National Assembly from October 2019 until June 2023.

== Parliamentary career ==
Tafeni is a member of the Economic Freedom Fighters. On 25 October 2019, Tafeni was sworn in as a Member of the National Assembly. She replaced Mmabatho Mokause, who had resigned.

On 6 May 2020, she became an Alternate Member of the Portfolio Committee on Justice and Correctional Services. She served on the committee until 4 September 2020. On 31 August 2022, she became a member of the newly reestablished Portfolio Committee on Human Settlements. She was also appointed an alternate member of the Portfolio Committee on Water and Sanitation on 14 April 2022. On 28 February 2023, she was discharged from the Portfolio Committee on Water and Sanitation and became an alternate member of the Portfolio Committee on Human Settlements.

Tafeni resigned from the National Assembly on 5 June 2023. On 13 June 2023, she was sworn in as a Permanent Delegate to the National Council of Provinces from the Eastern Cape.
