= Rosina Komane =

South African politician

Member of the National Assembly of South Africa
- In office 22 May 2019 – 28 May 2024

Personal details
- Party: Economic Freedom Fighters

Rosina Ntshetsana Komane is a South African politician who served as a Member of Parliament (MP) in the National Assembly of South Africa from May 2019 until May 2024. Komane is a member of the Economic Freedom Fighters party.

In June 2019, she was elected as an alternate member of the Standing Committee on Appropriations. She became an alternate member of the Portfolio Committee on Public Enterprises on 6 May 2020. Komane was appointed to the Portfolio Committee on Public Service and Administration, Performance Monitoring & Evaluation on 4 September 2020.
