= Lydia Moroane =

South African politician

Member of the National Assembly of South Africa
- In office 9 May 2023 – 28 May 2024
- Preceded by: Elvis Siwela
- Constituency: Mpumalanga

Personal details
- Party: African National Congress
- Profession: Politician

Matlanatso Lydia Moroane is a South African politician who has served as a Member of the National Assembly of South Africa from May 2023 until May 2024, representing the African National Congress. In 2020, Moroane served as the coordinator of the African National Congress Women's League in Mpumalanga.
