= Magdalene Louisa Pietersen =

South African politician

Member of the National Assembly of South Africa
- In office 24 February 2022 – 28 May 2024

Personal details
- Political party: African National Congress

Magdalene Louisa Pietersen (born November 1956) is a South African politician who served as a member of the National Assembly of South Africa from the African National Congress(ANC) from 2022 to 2024.
