= Gcinikhaya Mpumza =

South African politician

Member of the National Assembly of South Africa
- In office 22 May 2019 – 28 May 2024
- Constituency: Eastern Cape

Personal details
- Born: Gordon Gcinikhaya Mpumza
- Party: African National Congress
- Education: University of South Africa (BA)
- Profession: Politician

Gordon Gcinikhaya Mpumza is a South African politician for the African National Congress. He served as a member of the National Assembly from 2019 until 2024. Mpumza had previously served as the Executive Mayor and as the Municipal Manager of the Alfred Nzo District Municipality in the Eastern Cape.

== Biography ==
Mpumza earned a Bachelor of Arts (BA) from the University of South Africa. Mpumza is a member of the African National Congress. From 1990 to 1995, he was the chairperson of an ANC branch in an Eastern Cape sub-region. He was the regional chairperson of the ANC's Wild Coast Region from 1996 to 1998. Mpumza served on the ANC's provincial executive committee (PEC) from 2000 to 2015.

Mpumza had previously served as the Executive Mayor and as the municipal manager of the Alfred Nzo District Municipality. In 2014, he stood unsuccessfully for election to the Eastern Cape Provincial Legislature as a candidate on the ANC's list. In 2019 Mpumza was elected to the National Assembly. He was a member of the Portfolio Committee on Cooperative Governance and Traditional Affairs.

He did not seek reelection in 2024 and left Parliament.
