= Thapelo Mogale =

South African politician

Thapelo Mogale is a South African politician from Economic Freedom Fighters and member of the National Assembly of South Africa since 17 August 2022. He is a graduate of the University of South Africa.
