= Natasha Ntlangwini =

South African politician

Member of the National Assembly of South Africa
- In office 21 May 2014 – 28 May 2024

Personal details
- Born: Pearston, Cape Province, South Africa
- Party: Economic Freedom Fighters
- Spouse: Sivuyile
- Occupation: Politician

Elsabe Natasha Ntlangwini (née Louw) is a South African politician. A member of the Economic Freedom Fighters, she served as a Member of the National Assembly of South Africa from May 2014 until May 2024.

== Early life and education ==
Ntlangwini was born in Pearston in the Cape Province. Her father worked as a boilermaker, while her mother was employed as a cook at a boarding school. In 2002, she matriculated from Parkdene High School. She completed a one-year course on quality control through the University of South Africa.

== Political career ==
Ntlangwini was involved in both the ANC's youth league and women's league. In 2013, she joined the Economic Freedom Fighters after she resigned from her job. The next year, she was elected to the National Assembly as a party representative. She was re-elected in 2019.

Ntlangwini was ranked seventh on the EFF's regional-to-national list and 52nd on the EFF's national list for the 2024 general election. She was not re-elected to the National Assembly.

== Personal life ==
Ntlanwini is married to Sivuyile. In January 2020, she gave birth to her fourth daughter.
