= Willem Faber =

South African politician

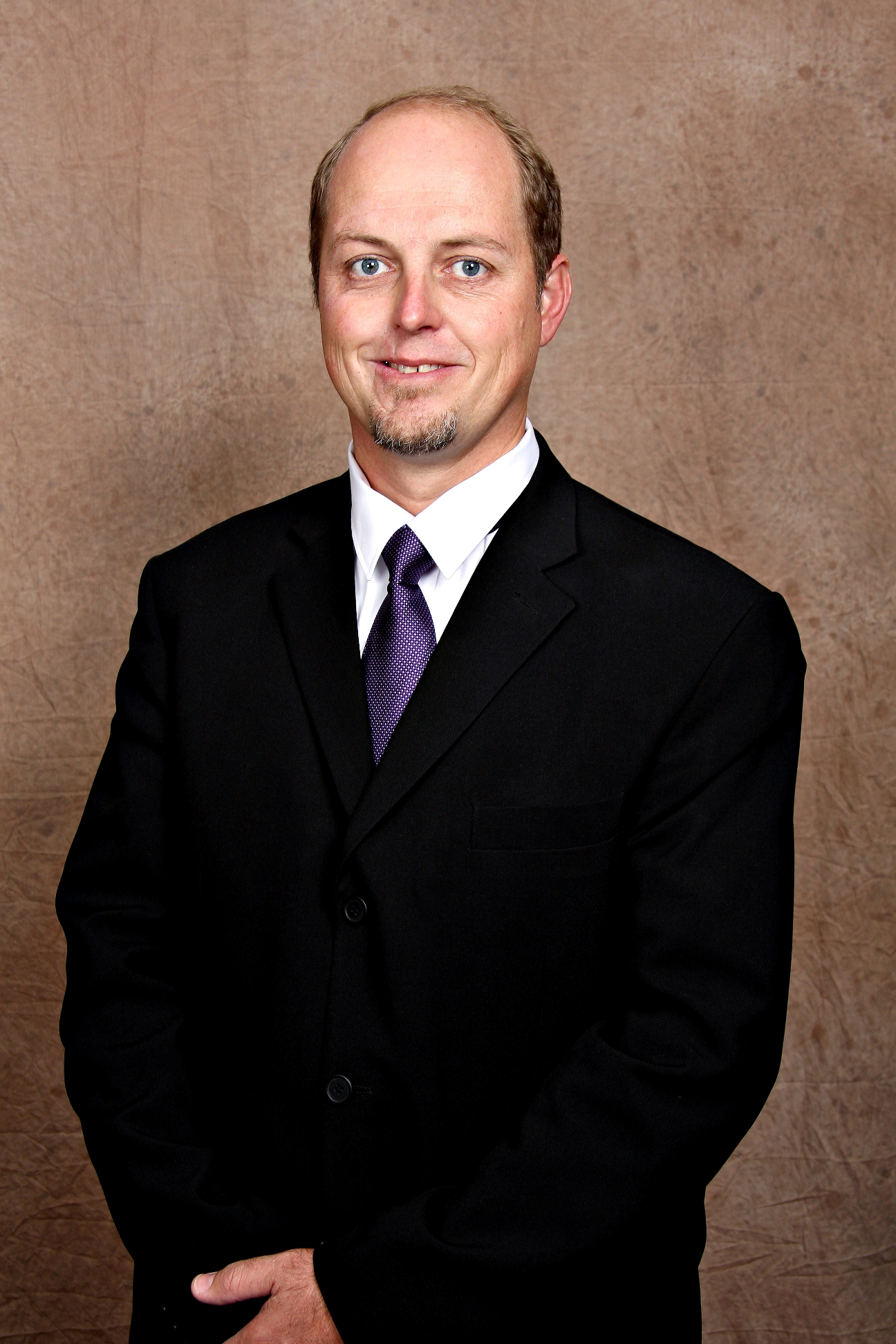
- Faber in May 2009

Member of the National Assembly of South Africa
- In office 22 May 2019 – 1 April 2024
- Constituency: Northern Cape

Permanent delegate to the National Council of Provinces from the Northern Cape
- In office 7 May 2009 – 7 May 2019

Personal details
- Born: Willem Frederik Faber; 15 February 1968 (age 58)
- Party: Democratic Alliance
- Occupation: Member of Parliament
- Profession: Politician
- Committees: Portfolio Committee on Sports, Arts and Culture (Alternate Member)

Willem Frederik Faber (born 15 February 1968) is a South African businessman and politician who served as a Member of the National Assembly from May 2019 until April 2024. Prior to serving in the NCOP, he was a permanent delegate to the National Council of Provinces, the upper house of Parliament, from May 2009 to May 2019. Faber is a member of the Democratic Alliance (DA).

== Career ==
Faber joined the Democratic Alliance and was a councillor of the Sol Plaatje Local Municipality, centred around Kimberley, the Northern Cape capital, for seven years.

From 2004 to 2009, Faber was Sales Director for the company Protech. In May 2009, he was elected as a permanent delegate to the National Council of Provinces, the upper house of parliament. He was one of six delegates from the Northern Cape. He was re-elected in 2014. Faber was elected to the lower house in May 2019, as he was placed second on the DA's national list for the general election. He was elected as a party whip when the caucus met to elect parliamentary leadership. In June 2019 he was appointed an Alternate Member of the Portfolio Committee on Sports, Arts and Culture. In 2020 he was appointed as a member of the Portfolio Committee on International Relations and Cooperation

Faber resigned from parliament on 1 April 2024.

== Personal life ==
Faber resides in Groot-Brakrivier, Western Cape.
