= Maggie Tlou =

South African politician (died 2022)

Member of Parliament from Gauteng
- In office 22 May 2019 – 3 February 2022

Personal details
- Died: 3 February 2022
- Party: ANC

Moloko Maggie Tlou (died 3 February 2022) was a South African politician who served as a Member of Parliament (MP) for the African National Congress from May 2019 until her death in February 2022.

During her time in parliament, she was a member of the Portfolio Committee on Cooperative Governance and Traditional Affairs.

== Death ==
Tlou died on 3 February 2022.
