= Vuyisile Malomane =

South African politician

Member of the National Assembly of South Africa
- In office 22 May 2019 – 28 May 2024
- Constituency: Mpumalanga

Personal details
- Party: African National Congress
- Profession: Politician

Vuyisile Promise Malomane is a South African politician and a former member of the National Assembly of South Africa from Mpumalanga. She is a member of the African National Congress.

== Parliamentary career ==
Malomane was placed 12th on the ANC's list of candidates from Mpumalanga for the National Assembly ahead of the 2019 provincial and national elections. At the election, she won a seat in the National Assembly. Upon election, she became a member of the Portfolio Committee on Public Service and Administration, Performance Monitoring & Evaluation and the Portfolio Committee on Sports, Arts and Culture.

On 20 September 2019, Malomane received a standing ovation from Democratic Alliance MPs for defending Afrikaans during a speech ahead of Heritage Day.

Malomane did not stand for reelection in 2024.
