= Sbuyiselwe Angela Buthelezi =

South African politician (1969–2024)

Member of the National Assembly of South Africa
- In office 14 June 2024 – 21 October 2024

Personal details
- Political party: Inkatha Freedom Party

Princess Sibuyiselwe Angela Buthelezi (18 May 1969 – 21 October 2024) was a South African politician and member of the National Assembly of South Africa, representing the Inkatha Freedom Party from 2021 until her death. Born into the Buthelezi royal family, she was the daughter of Prince Mangosuthu Buthelezi, the Inkosi of the Buthelezi clan and Traditional Prime Minister of the Zulu people. In the National Assembly she sat on the tourism, cooperative governance and traditional affairs, human settlements, and the water and sanitation portfolio committees.

Buthelezi died at a hospital in Cape Town, on 21 October 2024, at the age of 55.
