= Mandla Shikwambana =

South African politician

Member of the National Assembly of South Africa
- Incumbent
- Assumed office 1 June 2023

Personal details
- Party: Economic Freedom Fighters
- Profession: Politician

Mandla Shikwambana is a South African politician from the Economic Freedom Fighters. He has been a member of the National Assembly of South Africa since 1 June 2023. Shikwambana was elected to a full term in parliament at the 2024 general election.
