= Anastasia Motaung =

South African politician (died 2022)

Anastasia Motaung (died 14 August 2022) was a South African politician from the African National Congress. She was a member of the National Assembly of South Africa from 2019 until her death in 2022.

== Death ==
Motaung died after a short illness on 14 August 2022.
