= S'bongiseni Vilakazi =

South African politician

S'bongiseni Gerald Vilakazi is a South African politician and a Member of Parliament (MP) for the Democratic Alliance (DA).
