= Dikgang Stock =

South African politician

Member of the National Assembly of South Africa
- In office 22 May 2019 – 28 May 2024

Permanent delegate to the National Council of Provinces from the Northern Cape
- In office 22 May 2014 – 7 May 2019

Personal details
- Born: Dikgang Mathews Stock; 3 February 1976 (age 50)
- Party: African National Congress

Dikgang Mathews Stock (born 3 February 1976) is a South African politician from the Northern Cape who served as a Member of the National Assembly of South Africa from 2019 until 2024. Prior to his election to the National Assembly, he served as a permanent delegate to the National Council of Provinces from 2014 to 2019. Stock is a member of the African National Congress.

== Career ==
Stock is a former provincial secretary of the African National Congress Youth League, a former member of the ANC provincial executive committee, and a former member of the national executive committee of the ANC youth league.

=== National Council of Provinces ===
In 2014, Stock became a permanent delegate to the National Council of Provinces.

During his tenure in the NCOP, he was the chairperson of the Ad Hoc Committee on the Funding of Political Parties. He was also whip of the provincial delegation and a whip on the Joint Committee on Constitutional Review.

=== National Assembly ===
Stock was elected to the National Assembly of South Africa in May 2019. From 2019 until 2024, he served on the Portfolio Committee on Social Development.

Stock did not stand for reelection in 2024.
