= Thabile Masondo =

South African politician

Thabile Masondo MP

Member of the National Assembly of South Africa
- In office 22 May 2019 – 29 May 2024
- Constituency: Mpumalanga

Personal details
- Born: Thabile Sylvia Masondo
- Party: African National Congress
- Occupation: Member of Parliament
- Profession: Politician
- Committees: Committee on Multi-Party Women's Caucus; Portfolio Committee on Women, Youth and Persons with Disabilities

Thabile Sylvia Masondo is a South African politician who was elected to the National Assembly of South Africa at the 2019 general election as a member of the African National Congress.

Masondo is a member of the Committee on Multi-Party Women's Caucus and the Portfolio Committee on Women, Youth and Persons with Disabilities.
