= Farhat Essack =

South African politician

Farhat Essack MP

Member of the National Assembly of South Africa
- Incumbent
- Assumed office 25 April 2022

Permanent Delegate to the National Council of Provinces
- In office 22 May 2014 – 7 May 2019

Personal details
- Born: Farhat Essack
- Party: Democratic Alliance
- Spouse: Nadia
- Relations: 2

Farhat Essack is a South African politician who has been a Democratic Alliance (DA) Member of the National Assembly of South Africa since April 2022. Esaack had previously served as a Thaba Chweu Local Municipality councillor from 1996 to 2014 and as a Permanent Delegate to the National Council of Provinces from Mpumalanga from 2014 to 2019.

== Political career ==
Essack had served as a DA councillor in the Thaba Chweu Local Municipality in Mpumalanga from 1996 until his election to the National Council of Provinces, the upper house of parliament, in 2014. In the NCOP, he was a member of the Select Committee on Finance and the Select Committee on Appropriations. He was an alternate member of the Select Committee on Trade and International Relations. Essack also served on the Joint Standing Committee on the Financial Management of Parliament.

Essack was not appointed back to the NCOP after the 2019 elections. He was re-elected as the DA's provincial finance chairman in Mpumalanga in 2020.

In December 2020, the DA announced that Essack would be returning to Parliament as a DA member in the National Assembly, the lower house. He was sworn in on 25 April 2022. Essack was elected to a full term in the National Assembly in the 2024 general election.

== Personal life ==
Essack is married to Nadia. They have two children, Noushina and Yasser.
