= Vusi Khoza =

South African politician

Member of the National Assembly of South Africa
- In office 8 February 2023 – 1 November 2023

Member of the KwaZulu-Natal Legislature
- In office 21 May 2014 – February 2023

Personal details
- Other party: Economic Freedom Fighters (2013–2023); National Freedom Party (2011–2013); African National Congress (Prior to 2011)

Abednigo Vusumuzi Khoza is a South African politician who served as a member of the National Assembly of South Africa from February until October 2023. He previously served in the KwaZulu-Natal Legislature from May 2014 to February 2023. Khoza was a member of the Economic Freedom Fighters party.

== Background ==
While a teenager, Khoza was involved in the student Christian movement. He was a shop steward for a trade union as well as an activist for the United Democratic Front. He became a member of the African National Congress in the 1980s. In 2011, he was appointed provincial secretary for the newly formed National Freedom Party.

In November 2012, Khoza was found guilty of public violence stemming from his involvement in an incident in 2009 where two foreign nationals were murdered in Dr Yusuf Dadoo (Broad) Street in Albert Park, Durban. Khoza had been serving as the ward councillor for Albert Park as a member of the ANC at the time. He was given a three-year suspended sentence for public violence and conspiracy to commit assault. Khoza stepped down as provincial secretary of the NFP as a result of his conviction.

== Career in the EFF ==
Khoza joined the Economic Freedom Fighters in 2013 and was appointed its provincial convenor. He was the party's premier candidate for the 2014 general elections. He was elected to the KwaZulu-Natal Legislature as the EFF won two seats.

Khoza was elected provincial chairperson of the EFF in 2018 and re-elected to the provincial legislature in 2019. He unsuccessfully sought re-election in 2022, losing to his deputy Mongezi Twala.

In early-2023, Khoza resigned from the provincial legislature as he was redeployed to the National Assembly of South Africa. He was sworn in on 8 February 2023.

Khoza was one of four EFF MPs who were banned from attending the party's 10th anniversary celebrations at the FNB Stadium on 29 July 2023 for failing to procure transport to the celebrations for their constituents. On 29 August 2023, he was "recalled" by the party. Khoza was expelled from the EFF on 20 October 2023 and lost his parliamentary membership.
