= Eugene Mthethwa =

South African politician

Member of the National Assembly of South Africa
- Incumbent
- Assumed office 1 June 2023

Personal details
- Born: October 5, 1967 (age 58)
- Party: Economic Freedom Fighters
- Profession: Politician

Eugene Mthethwa (born 5 October 1967) is a South African politician from the Economic Freedom Fighters. He has been a member of the National Assembly of South Africa since 1 June 2023.
