= Nceba Hinana =

South African politician

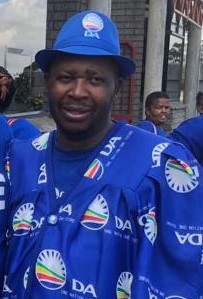

Member of the National Assembly of South Africa
- In office 22 May 2019 – 4 March 2023

Member of the Western Cape Provincial Parliament
- In office 21 May 2014 – 7 May 2019

Personal details
- Born: Nceba Ephraim Hinana; 13 April 1966
- Died: c. July 2026
- Party: Democratic Alliance

Nceba Ephraim Hinana (13 April 1966 – c. July 2026) was a South African politician of the Democratic Alliance who served as a Member of the National Assembly of South Africa from May 2019 until his resignation in March 2023. He was a Member of the Western Cape Provincial Parliament from May 2014 to May 2019.

== Political career ==
Hinana served as a DA councillor in the City of Cape Town before his election to the Western Cape Provincial Parliament in May 2014. He was then appointed chairperson of the transport and public works committee.

Prior to the 2019 general election, he was given the 16th position on the DA's national list. At the election on 8 May 2019, he won a seat in the National Assembly. Hinana was sworn in as a Member of Parliament on 22 May 2019. In parliament, he served as an alternate member of the Portfolio Committee on Employment and Labour.

Hinana resigned from the National Assembly on 4 March 2023.

== Death ==
On 29 July 2026, the Democratic Alliance announced Hinana's death in a post on X and paid tribute to him.
