= Christopher Mario Fry =

South African politician

Member of the Western Cape Provincial Parliament
- In office 3 August 2022 – 28 May 2024

Member of the National Assembly of South Africa
- In office 11 May 2022 – August 2022

Personal details
- Born: Christopher Mario Fry
- Party: Democratic Alliance

Christopher Mario Fry is a South African politician who was a Democratic Alliance (DA) Member of the Western Cape Provincial Parliament from August 2022 until May 2024. He previously served as a DA Member of the National Assembly of South Africa from May to August 2022.

== Background ==
Fry studied Project Management at the University of Cape Town between 2008 and 2009. From November 2018 to November 2021, he was a Democratic Alliance (DA) proportional representation (PR) councillor of the Cape Town City Council. He was a member of the Sub Council 3, the Energy and Climate Change Portfolio Committee, the Leadership and Development Portfolio Committee and the Municipal Public Accounts Committee.

In December 2021, the DA announced that Fry would be joining the National Assembly. He was sworn in on 11 May 2022. Fry later resigned from the National Assembly to become a member of the Western Cape Provincial Parliament. He was sworn in on 3 August 2022. He left the provincial parliament at the 2024 provincial election.
