= Mzwakhe Sibisi =

South African politician (1970–2023)

Member of the National Assembly of South Africa
- In office 22 May 2019 – 18 October 2023

Personal details
- Born: Christopher Howard Mzwakhe Sibisi; 27 July 1970
- Died: 18 October 2023 (aged 53)
- Party: National Freedom Party
- Profession: Educator; Politician

Christopher Howard Mzwakhe Sibisi (27 July 1970 – 18 October 2023) was a South African educator and politician who served as a Member of the National Assembly of South Africa from May 2019 until his death. Sibisi was a member of the National Freedom Party. He served as the party's acting secretary-general in 2019.

== Education ==
Sibisi held a matric certificate as well as a teacher's diploma.

== Politics ==
Sibisi was a member of the National Freedom Party. He was appointed the acting secretary general of the party after incumbent Nhlanhlakayise Khubisa had resigned. He held this position until December 2019, when Canaan Mdletshe was elected to the position.

== Parliamentary career ==
Sibisi was nominated to the National Assembly of South Africa after the general election held on 8 May 2019. He was sworn in as an MP on 22 May 2019.

=== Committees ===
On 27 June 2019, he received his committee assignments:

- Portfolio Committee on Basic Education (Alternate Member)
- Portfolio Committee on Cooperative Governance and Traditional Affairs (Alternate Member)
- Portfolio Committee on Employment and Labour (Alternate Member)
- Portfolio Committee on Public Service and Administration (Member)
- Portfolio Committee on Sports, Arts and Culture (Member)
- Portfolio Committee on Transport (Alternate Member)

== Death ==
Sibisi died on 18 October 2023.
