= Thokozile Malinga =

South African politician

Member of the National Assembly of South Africa
- In office 22 May 2019 – 28 May 2024
- Constituency: Mpumalanga

Personal details
- Born: Valentia Thokozile Malinga; 19 December 1974 (age 51)
- Party: African National Congress
- Occupation: Member of Parliament
- Profession: Politician

Valentia Thokozile Malinga (born 19 December 1974) is a South African politician and a former Member of the National Assembly of South Africa from Mpumalanga. She is a member of the African National Congress.

== Background ==
Malinga has a matric certificate. She studied for a Bachelor of Arts in Education, but could not complete the degree. She is a former member of the mayoral committee in the Lekwa Local Municipality in Mpumalanga and a current member of the provincial executive committee of the African National Congress (ANC). She had previously been the branch secretary of the ANC's Johnny Mokoena branch, a sub-region convenor of the African National Congress Youth League, and a regional executive committee member and a regional working committee member of the ANC's Gert Sibande region in Mpumalanga.

In 2014, she stood for election to the Mpumalanga Provincial Legislature as 26th on the ANC's list. She was not elected. Malinga then worked as an administrator at the ANC's Lekwa constituency office until 2016.

== Parliamentary career ==
In 2019 Malinga stood for election to the South African National Assembly as 7th on the ANC's list of National Assembly candidates from Mpumalanga. She was elected to the National Assembly in the election.

Malinga served as a member of the Portfolio Committee on Mineral Resources and Energy and as an alternate member of the Portfolio Committee on Public Enterprises.

Malinga did not stand for reelection in 2024.
