= Fikile Masiko =

South African politician

Fikile Masiko MP

Member of the National Assembly of South Africa
- Incumbent
- Assumed office 10 June 2019
- Preceded by: Nomaindia Mfeketo

Personal details
- Born: Fikile Andiswa Masiko
- Party: African National Congress
- Occupation: Member of Parliament
- Profession: Politician

Fikile Andiswa Masiko is a South African politician who serves as a Member of the National Assembly for the African National Congress. Masiko was appointed to Parliament in June 2019.

== Parliamentary career ==
Masiko stood unsuccessfully for Parliament at the general election on 8 May 2019. However, Nomaindia Mfeketo resigned from the National Assembly of South Africa with effect from 31 May 2019. The African National Congress appointed Masiko as her successor, and she was sworn in on 10 June 2019.

=== Committee assignments ===
- Committee on Multi-Party Women's Caucus
- Joint Committee on Ethics and Members Interests
- Portfolio Committee on Women, Youth and Persons with Disabilities
