= Makosini Chabangu =

South African politician

Member of the National Assembly of South Africa
- In office 22 May 2019 – 2 February 2023

Permanent delegate to the National Council of Provinces from the Free State
- In office 19 September 2016 – 7 May 2019

Personal details
- Born: Makosini Mishack Chabangu
- Died: 11 December 2023
- Party: Economic Freedom Fighters

Makosini Mishack Chabangu was a South African politician from the Free State. He is a member of the Economic Freedom Fighters (EFF). Chabangu was a Member of the National Assembly of South Africa from 2019 until his resignation in February 2023.

From 2016 until 2019, Chabangu was a permanent delegate to the National Council of Provinces. During his time in the NCOP, he served on the Select Committee on Trade and International Relations (2016–2019), the Select Committee on Education and Recreation (2016–2019), the Select Committee on Social Services (2016–2019), the Select Committee on Economic and Business Development (2016–2019) and the Joint Constitutional Review Committee (2018).

After becoming a Member of the Parliament in the National Assembly, he served on the Portfolio Committee on Transport as an alternate member.

Chabangu resigned from Parliament with effect from 2 February 2023.

He died on 11 December 2023.
