= Peter Keetse =

South African politician

Member of the National Assembly of South Africa
- In office 22 May 2019 – 5 October 2020

Personal details
- Born: Phuti Peter Keetse Sekhung, Limpopo Province, South Africa
- Party: Economic Freedom Fighters
- Profession: Politician

Phuti Peter Keetse is a South African politician who served as a Member of the National Assembly for the Economic Freedom Fighters (EFF) from 2019 to 2020. He was the president of the party's student organisation and a FeesMustFall activist. Keetse played a very significant role in mobilising students' activist and was also an active in the early formation of the EFF Student Command, Which he eventually became its President.

== Background ==
Keetse was born in Sekhung village in Limpopo. He has a BTech in Civil Engineering from the University of Johannesburg. He was active in #FeesMustFall protests that occurred at the university.

Keetse joined the Economic Freedom Fighters, when it was founded back in July 2013. In 2017, he was elected president of its student command.

== Parliamentary career ==
Keetse was elected to the National Assembly of South Africa in May 2019. In June 2019, he became a member of the Portfolio Committee on Higher Education, Science and Technology. He was a member of the portfolio committee until 4 September 2020.

Keetse resigned from Parliament on 5 October 2020.
