= Shadow Cabinet of Mmusi Maimane =

Former Shadow Cabinet of South Africa

The Shadow Cabinet of Mmusi Maimane was formed on 5 June 2014 in South Africa following his election as Parliamentary Leader of the Democratic Alliance and Leader of the Opposition on 29 May 2014. The Democratic Alliance parliamentary caucus also elected other caucus leadership. John Steenhuisen was elected Chief Whip with Anchen Dreyer as Caucus Chairperson. These elections all occurred following the 2014 general elections, in which the Democratic Alliance retained its post as the Official Opposition in the National Assembly of South Africa.

The shadow cabinet has been reshuffled on various occasions. The first reshuffle occurred in October 2015, when Member of Parliament, Dianne Kohler Barnard, was demoted from her position due to her publishing a controversial Facebook post. The next occurred in November 2016, in the aftermath of the party's parliamentary mid-term caucus elections. The shadow cabinet was reshuffled for the third time in July 2017, following the departure of Wilmot James.

Following the 2019 general elections, the Democratic Alliance remained the Official Opposition and the party subsequently held parliamentary caucus elections. Maimane returned to the position of Leader of the Opposition with John Steenhuisen as Chief Whip. Annelie Lotriet was elected Chairperson of the Caucus. Maimane announced the new shadow cabinet on 5 June 2019.

Maimane resigned as parliamentary leader of the DA on 24 October 2019, though the current shadow cabinet had been retained by acting parliamentary leader Annelie Lotriet. John Steenhuisen has since been elected parliamentary leader and he announced his shadow cabinet in December 2020.

== Formation ==
Mmusi Maimane was elected unopposed as the parliamentary leader of the Democratic Alliance and Leader of the Opposition in the National Assembly of South Africa on 29 May 2014, effectively becoming the party's second black parliamentary leader, following the retirement of Lindiwe Mazibuko. Although the media speculated that Democratic Alliance Federal Leader Helen Zille would run for the post, she opted to remain Premier of the Western Cape.

Alongside the election for parliamentary leader, other party caucus leadership elections were also held. John Steenhuisen was elected chief whip, succeeding party veteran Watty Watson. Sandy Kalyan and Michael Waters were both nominated for the post of deputy chief whip. Waters inevitably defeated Kalyan. Several whips were also elected. Anchen Dreyer and Richard Majola contested the election for the post of caucus chairperson. Dreyer was elected caucus chairperson with Majola as Deputy Caucus Chairperson. Elza van Lingen secured a second term as the party's leader in the National Council of Provinces, while Cathlene Labuschagne was named the party's whip in the NCOP.

On 5 June 2014, Maimane announced the composition of his shadow cabinet. Upon the announcement, he said, "This shadow cabinet will make pragmatic legislative proposals that will tackle South Africa's problems head-on, with a commitment to the creation of real jobs in South Africa."

== Membership ==
=== 2014–2019 ===
==== Members of the Shadow Cabinet ====
Democratic Alliance leader Mmusi Maimane announced the latest changes to the Shadow Cabinet on 1 June 2017.

Ministry	Shadow Minister	Shadow Deputy Minister
Leader of the Opposition (South Africa); Parliamentary Leader of the Democratic Alliance	The Hon. Mmusi Maimane MP	
Agriculture, Forestry and Fisheries	The Hon. Annette Steyn MP	The Hon. Pieter van Dalen MP
Arts and Culture	The Hon. Winston Rabotapi MP	The Hon. Allen Grootboom MP
Basic Education	The Hon. Ian Ollis MP	The Hon. Nomsa Marchesi MP
Communications	The Hon. Phumzile van Damme MP	The Hon. Veronica van Dyk MP
Co-operative Governance and Traditional Affairs	The Hon. Kevin Mileham MP	The Hon. Mbulelo Bara MP
Defence and Military Veterans	The Hon. Kobus Marais MP	The Hon. Shahid Esau MP
Economic Development	The Hon. Michael Cardo MP	The Hon. Patrick Atkinson MP
Energy	The Hon. Gordon Mackay MP	The Hon. Tandeka Gqada MP
Environmental Affairs	The Hon. Thomas Hadebe MP	The Hon. Ross Purdon MP
Finance	The Hon. David Maynier MP	The Hon. Alf Lees MP
Health	The Hon. Patricia Kopane MP	The Hon. Lungiswa James MP
Higher Education and Training	The Hon. Belinda Bozzoli MP	The Hon. Andricus van der Westhuizen MP
Home Affairs	The Hon. Haniff Hoosen MP	The Hon. Archibold Figlan MP
Human Settlements	The Hon. Solly Malatsi MP	The Hon. Mbulelo Bara MP
International Relations and Cooperation	The Hon. Stevens Mokgalapa MP	The Hon. Sandy Kalyan MP
Justice and Correctional Services	The Hon. Glynnis Breytenbach MP (Justice); The Hon. James Selfe MP (Correctional Services)	The Hon. Werner Horn MP
Labour	The Hon. Michael Bagraim MP	The Hon. Derrick America MP
Mineral Resources	The Hon. James Lorimer MP	The Hon. Hendrik Schmidt MP
Police	The Hon. Zakhele Mbhele MP	The Hon. Dianne Kohler Barnard MP
Presidency	The Hon. Sej Motau MP	The Hon. Yusuf Cassim MP
Public Enterprises	The Hon. Natasha Mazzone MP	The Hon. Erik Marais MP
Public Service and Administration	The Hon. Désirée van der Walt MP	The Hon. Zelda Jongbloed MP
Public Works	The Hon. Malcolm Figg MP	Vacant
Rural Development and Land Reform	The Hon. Thomas Walters MP	The Hon. Ken Robertson MP
Science and Technology	The Hon. Annelie Lotriet MP	The Hon. Chantel King MP
Small Business Development	The Hon. Toby Chance MP	The Hon. Henro Krüger MP
Social Development	The Hon. Bridget Masango MP	The Hon. Lindy Wilson MP
Sport and Recreation	The Hon. Tsepo Mhlongo MP	The Hon. Darren Bergman MP
State Security	The Hon. Dirk Stubbe MP	The Hon. Herman Groenewald MP
Telecommunications and Postal Services	The Hon. Marian Shinn MP	The Hon. Cameron Mackenzie MP
Tourism	The Hon. James Vos MP	The Hon. Gregory Krumbock MP
Trade and Industry	The Hon. Dean Macpherson MP	The Hon. Ghaleb Cachalia MP
Transport	The Hon. Manuel de Freitas MP	The Hon. Chris Hunsinger MP
Water and Sanitation	The Hon. Heinrich Volmink MP	The Hon. Leon Basson MP
Women in the Presidency	The Hon. Denise Robinson MP	The Hon. Terri Stander MP

==== Shadow Ministers in Standing Committees in the National Assembly of South Africa ====
Ministry	Shadow Minister	Shadow Deputy Minister
Appropriations (SCoA)	The Hon. Alan McLoughlin MP	The Hon. Brandon Topham MP
Auditor-General (SCoAG)	The Hon. Alan McLoughlin MP	The Hon. Brandon Topham MP
Finance (SCoF)	The Hon. David Maynier MP	The Hon. Alf Lees MP
Public Accounts (SCoPA)	The Hon. David Ross MP	The Hon. Tim Brauteseth MP

==== Parliamentary Caucus Leadership ====
Parliamentary leadership team following internal caucus elections on 29 May 2014.

Member	Position
The Hon. Mmusi Maimane MP	Parliamentary Leader of the Democratic Alliance
The Hon. Cathy Labuschagne MP	Leader in the National Council of Provinces
The Hon. Anchen Dreyer MP	Chairperson of the Caucus
The Hon. Richard Majola MP	Deputy Chairperson of the Caucus
The Hon. John Steenhuisen MP	Opposition Chief Whip in the National Assembly
The Hon. Mike Waters MP	Opposition Deputy Chief Whip in the National Assembly
The Hon. Natasha Mazzone MP	Whip in the National Assembly
The Hon. Dion George MP	Whip in the National Assembly
The Hon. Patricia Kopane MP	Whip in the National Assembly
The Hon. James Masango MP	Whip in the National Assembly
The Hon. Erik Marais MP	Whip in the National Assembly
The Hon. Annette Steyn MP	Whip in the National Assembly
The Hon. Dianne Kohler-Barnard MP	Whip in the National Assembly
The Hon. Gavin Davis MP	Whip in the National Assembly
The Hon. Ian Ollis MP	Whip in the National Assembly
The Hon. Lance Greyling MP	Whip in the National Assembly
The Hon. Stevens Mokgalapa MP	Whip in the National Assembly
The Hon. ? MP	Whip in the National Council of Provinces
The Hon. Geordin Hill-Lewis MP	Parliamentary Counsel to Parliamentary Leader of the Democratic Alliance
The Hon. Refiloe Ntsekhe MPL	Democratic Alliance National Spokespersons

=== 2019 ===
==== Members of the Shadow Cabinet ====
The following table depicted the composition of the shadow cabinet announced on 5 June 2019.

Ministry	Shadow Minister	Shadow Deputy Minister
Leader of the Opposition (South Africa); Parliamentary Leader of the Democratic Alliance	The Hon. Mmusi Maimane MP	
Presidency	The Hon. Solly Malatsi MP	The Hon. Ghaleb Cachalia MP
Presidency: Women, Youth and Persons with Disabilities	The Hon. Luyolo Mphithi MP	The Hon. Nazley Sharif MP
Justice and Correctional Services	The Hon. Glynnis Breytenbach MP	The Hon. Werner Horn MP
Public Service and Administration	The Hon. Leon Schreiber MP	The Hon. Michéle Clarke MP
Defence and Military Veterans	The Hon. Kobus Marais MP	The Hon. Maliyakhe Shelembe MP
Home Affairs	The Hon. Joe McGluwa MP	The Hon. Angel Khanyile MP
State Security	The Hon. Dianne Kohler Barnard MP	The Hon. Mimmy Gondwe MP
Police	The Hon. Andrew Whitfield MP	The Hon. Okkie Terblanche MP
Trade and Industry	The Hon. Dean Macpherson MP	The Hon. Mathew Cuthbert MP
Finance	The Hon. Geordin Hill-Lewis MP	The Hon. Dion George MP
Agriculture, Land Reform and Rural Development	The Hon. Annette Steyn MP	The Hon. Thandeka Mbabama MP
Human Settlements, Water and Sanitation	The Hon. Leon Basson MP	The Hon. Emma Powell MP
Basic Education	The Hon. Nomsa Marchesi MP	The Hon. Désirée van der Walt MP
Health	The Hon. Siviwe Gwarube MP	The Hon. Lindy Wilson MP
International Relations and Cooperation	The Hon. Darren Bergman MP	The Hon. Mergan Chetty MP
Higher Education, Science and Technology	The Hon. Belinda Bozzoli MP	The Hon. Baxolile Nodada MP
Environment, Forestry and Fisheries	The Hon. James Lorimer MP	The Hon. Hannah Winkler MP
Transport	The Hon. Chris Hunsinger MP	The Hon. Thami Mabhena MP
Mineral Resources and Energy	The Hon. Kevin Mileham MP	The Hon. Cheryl Phillips MP
Social Development	The Hon. Bridget Masango MP	The Hon. Thandi Mpambo-Sibhukwana MP
Public Enterprises	The Hon. Natasha Mazzone MP	The Hon. Erik Marais MP
Sports, Arts and Culture	The Hon. Tsepo Mhlongo MP	The Hon. Veronica van Dyk MP
Employment and Labour	The Hon. Michael Cardo MP	The Hon. Michael Bagraim MP
Public Works and Infrastructure	The Hon. Patricia Kopane MP	The Hon. Samantha Graham MP
Small Business Development	The Hon. Zakhele Mbhele MP	The Hon. Henro Kruger MP
Cooperative Governance and Traditional Affairs	The Hon. Haniff Hoosen MP	The Hon. Cilliers Brink MP
Communications and Telecommunications	The Hon. Phumzile van Damme MP	The Hon. Cameron Mackenzie MP
Tourism	The Hon. Manuel De Freitas MP	The Hon. Hlanganani Gumbi MP

==== Shadow Ministers in Standing Committees in the National Assembly ====
Ministry	Shadow Minister	Shadow Deputy Minister
Public Accounts (SCoPA)	The Hon. Alf Lees MP	The Hon. Benedicta van Minnen MP
Auditor-General (SCoAG)	The Hon. Jan de Villiers MP	The Hon. Eleanore Bouw-Spies MP
Appropriations (SCoA)	The Hon. Denis Joseph MP	The Hon. Ashor Sarupen MP

==== Parliamentary Caucus Leadership ====
Parliamentary leadership team following internal caucus elections on 30 May 2019.

Member	Position
The Hon. Mmusi Maimane MP	Parliamentary Leader of the Democratic Alliance
The Hon. Cathlene Labuschagne	Leader in the National Council of Provinces
The Hon. Annelie Lotriet MP	Chairperson of the Caucus
The Hon. Haniff Hoosen MP	Deputy Chairperson of the Caucus
The Hon. John Steenhuisen MP	Opposition Chief Whip in the National Assembly
The Hon. Jacques Julius MP	Opposition Deputy Chief Whip in the National Assembly
The Hon. Natasha Mazzone MP	Whip in the National Assembly
The Hon. Phumzile van Damme MP	Whip in the National Assembly
The Hon. Erik Marais MP	Whip in the National Assembly
The Hon. Solly Malatsi MP	Whip in the National Assembly
The Hon. Geordin Hill-Lewis MP	Whip in the National Assembly
The Hon. James Lorimer MP	Whip in the National Assembly
The Hon. Chris Hunsinger MP	Whip in the National Assembly
The Hon. Darren Bergman MP	Whip in the National Assembly
The Hon. Nomsa Tarabella Marchesi MP	Whip in the National Assembly
The Hon. Annette Steyn MP	Whip in the National Assembly
The Hon. Willem Faber MP	Whip in the National Assembly
The Hon. Patricia Kopane MP	Whip in the National Assembly
The Hon. Cathlene Labuschagne	Western Cape Provincial Whip in the National Council of Provinces
