= Shadow Cabinet of John Steenhuisen =

South African shadow cabinet

The Shadow Cabinet of John Steenhuisen succeeded the Shadow Cabinet of Mmusi Maimane as the Official Opposition Shadow Cabinet. After John Steenhuisen was elected unopposed as the parliamentary leader by the Democratic Alliance's caucus on 27 October 2019, he announced a new shadow cabinet, on 5 December 2020.

In his capacity as Leader of the Official Opposition, Steenhuisen led the Official Opposition Shadow Cabinet. Serving alongside Steenhuisen is Siviwe Gwarube, as Chief Whip, and Annelie Lotriet as Deputy Chief Whip and Chairperson of the Caucus.

The Shadow Cabinet was dissolved upon the DA entering into a coalition government with the ruling African National Congress on 14 June 2024, following the 2024 general election.

== Members of the Shadow Cabinet ==
Democratic Alliance parliamentary leader John Steenhuisen introduced a new Shadow Cabinet on 5 December 2020. He reshuffled it in August 2022, and again in April 2023.

| Department | Shadow Minister | Shadow Deputy Minister |
|---|---|---|
| Leader of the Opposition (South Africa); Parliamentary Leader of the Democratic Alliance | The Hon. John Steenhuisen MP | |
| Presidency | The Hon. Solly Malatsi MP | The Hon. Joe McGluwa MP |
| Presidency: Women, Youth and Persons with Disabilities | The Hon. Nazley Sharif MP | The Hon. Nomsa Tarabella Marchesi MP |
| Presidency: Electricity | The Hon. Samantha Graham MP | |
| Justice | The Hon. Glynnis Breytenbach MP | The Hon. Werner Horn MP |
| Correctional Services | The Hon. James Selfe MP | |
| Public Service and Administration | The Hon. Leon Schreiber MP | The Hon. Mimmy Gondwe MP |
| Defence and Military Veterans | The Hon. Kobus Marais MP | The Hon. Maliyakhe Shelembe MP |
| Home Affairs | The Hon. Angel Khanyile MP | The Hon. Adrian Roos MP |
| State Security | The Hon. Dianne Kohler-Barnard MP | The Hon. Dirk Stubbe MP |
| Police | The Hon. Andrew Whitfield MP | The Hon. Okkie Terblanche MP |
| Trade and Industry | The Hon. Dean Macpherson MP | The Hon. Darren Bergman MP |
| Finance | Vacant | The Hon. Dion George MP |
| Agriculture, Land Reform and Rural Development | The Hon. Phineas Masipa MP | The Hon. Thandeka Mbabama MP |
| Human Settlements | The Hon. Luyolo Mphithi MP | |
| Water & Sanitation | The Hon. Leon Basson MP | |
| Basic Education | The Hon. Baxolile Nodada MP | The Hon. Marina van Zyl MP |
| Health | The Hon. Michéle Clarke MP | The Hon. Lindy Wilson MP |
| International Relations and Cooperation | The Hon. Emma Powell MP | The Hon. Mergan Chetty MP |
| Higher Education, Science and Technology | The Hon. Chantel King MP | The Hon. Karabo Khakhau MP |
| Environment, Forestry and Fisheries | The Hon. Dave Bryant MP | The Hon. Annerie Weber MP |
| Transport | The Hon. Chris Hunsinger MP | The Hon. Thamsanqa Mabhena MP |
| Mineral Resources | The Hon. James Lorimer MP | |
| Energy | The Hon. Kevin Mileham MP | |
| Social Development | The Hon. Bridget Masango MP | The Hon. Alexandra Abrahams MP |
| Public Enterprises | The Hon. Ghaleb Cachalia MP | The Hon. Michéle Clarke MP |
| Sports, Arts and Culture | The Hon. Tsepo Mhlongo MP | The Hon. Veronica van Dyk MP |
| Employment and Labour | The Hon. Michael Cardo MP | The Hon. Michael Bagraim MP |
| Public Works and Infrastructure | The Hon. Sello Seitlholo MP | The Hon. Madeleine Hicklin MP |
| Small Business Development | The Hon. Jan de Villiers MP | The Hon. Henro Krüger MP |
| Cooperative Governance and Traditional Affairs | The Hon. Eleanore Bouw-Spies MP | Vacant |
| Communications and Digital Technologies | The Hon. Natasha Mazzone MP | Vacant |
| Tourism | The Hon. Manuel De Freitas MP | The Hon. Haseenabanu Ismail MP |

=== Shadow Ministers in Standing Committees in the National Assembly ===
| Ministry | Shadow Minister | Shadow Deputy Minister |
|---|---|---|
| Public Accounts (SCoPA) | The Hon. Alf Lees MP | The Hon. Benedicta van Minnen MP |
| Auditor-General (SCoAG) | The Hon. Haniff Hoosen MP | The Hon. Cheryl Phillips MP |
| Appropriations (SCoA) | The Hon. Ashor Sarupen MP | The Hon. Erik Marais MP |
