= Leon Schreiber =

South African writer and politician (born 1988)

The Honourable Leon Schreiber MP
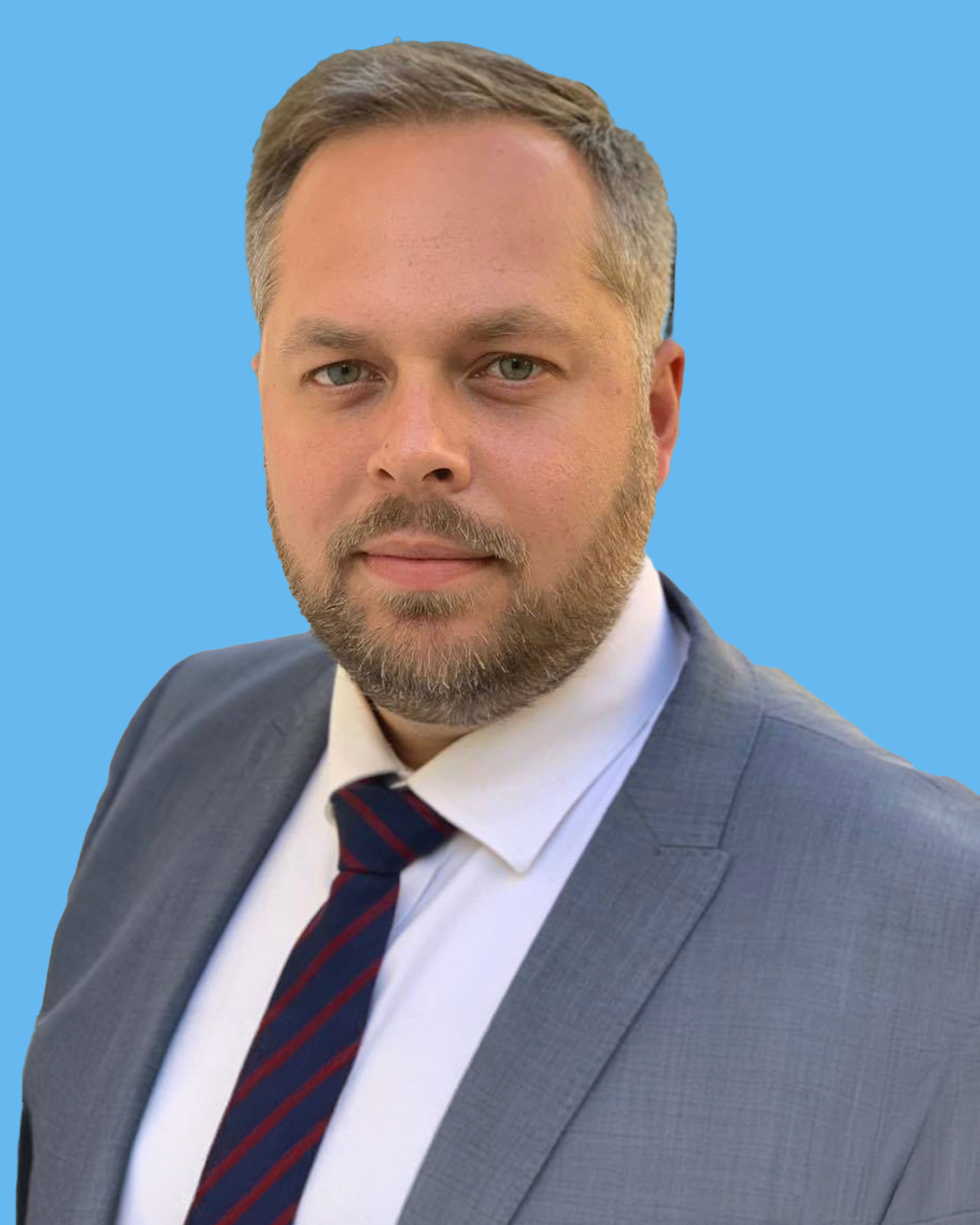
- Schreiber in 2024

Minister of Home Affairs
- Incumbent
- Assumed office 3 July 2024
- President: Cyril Ramaphosa
- Deputy: Njabulo Nzuza
- Preceded by: Aaron Motsoaledi

Member of the National Assembly
- Incumbent
- Assumed office 22 May 2019
- Constituency: Western Cape (2019–2024)

Shadow Minister of Public Service and Administration
- In office 22 May 2019 – 30 June 2024
- Deputy: Michéle Clarke; Mimmy Gondwe
- Leader: John Steenhuisen; Mmusi Maimane
- Preceded by: Désirée van der Walt

Personal details
- Born: Leon Amos Schreiber; 11 September 1988 (age 37) Piketberg, Cape Province (now Western Cape), South Africa
- Citizenship: South Africa
- Party: Democratic Alliance
- Education: Paul Roos Gymnasium
- Alma mater: Stellenbosch University; Free University of Berlin (PhD)

Leon Amos Schreiber (born 11 September 1988) is a South African writer and politician who is currently serving as Minister of Home Affairs since 3 July 2024. A member of the Democratic Alliance (DA), he has been a Member of the National Assembly of South Africa since May 2019.

Before his appointment to the cabinet, he served in the shadow cabinet as Shadow Minister of Public Service and Administration during the Sixth Parliament from May 2019 to June 2024. In that capacity he rose to prominence for his campaign against cadre deployment in the national government. He is also a prominent advocate for Afrikaans language rights at Stellenbosch University.

== Early life and education ==
Born on 11 September 1988 in Piketberg, Schreiber grew up in Kleinzee, a small town in the Namakwa District of the Northern Cape Province.

He matriculated in 2006 at the Paul Roos Gymnasium in Stellenbosch. Thereafter he attended Stellenbosch University, graduating with a BA in international studies in 2009, Honours in political science in 2010, and an MA in political science in 2011.

== Career in research ==
In 2015, he completed a PhD in political science at the Free University of Berlin. His dissertation was about social welfare institutions in South Africa and Brazil. In the same year, he was the first runner-up in the St. Gallen Symposium Global Essay Competition for an essay about basic income guarantees.

Between 2015 and 2019, Schreiber was attached to Princeton University, where he was a senior research specialist in the Innovations for Successful Societies programme. His research interests included social policy, South African politics, the political economy of development, and, in particular, institution-building in low- and middle-income countries. He later said that his political career grew from his recognition, through his research, of the importance of ethical political leadership in ensuring good governance.

During this period, Schreiber was named as one of the Mail & Guardian's 200 Young South Africans in 2017. In 2018 he published Coalition Country: South Africa After the ANC, which predicted that the African National Congress (ANC) would lose its electoral majority.

== Political career ==
=== Parliamentarian: 2019–2024 ===
In the May 2019 general election, Schreiber stood as a candidate for the opposition Democratic Alliance (DA). Ranked eighth on the party's regional list in the Western Cape constituency, he was elected to a seat in the National Assembly, the lower house of the South African Parliament. On 5 June, he was additionally appointed as Shadow Minister of Public Service and Administration in the shadow cabinet of DA leader Mmusi Maimane. He retained that position throughout the Sixth Parliament, gaining reappointment in the shadow cabinet of Maimane's successor, John Steenhuisen, in 2020. The Mail & Guardian said that he became regarded as "one of [the] most effective members" of the DA's shadow cabinet.

In his shadow cabinet portfolio, Schreiber represented the DA in the Portfolio Committee on Public Service and Administration. He was also appointed to the Section 194 Enquiry into Busisiwe Mkhwebane's impeachment as Public Protector. In addition, in December 2021, he was appointed as one of the DA's 12 whips, and on 21 April 2023, he was appointed as strategy and communications advisor to DA leader Steenhuisen.

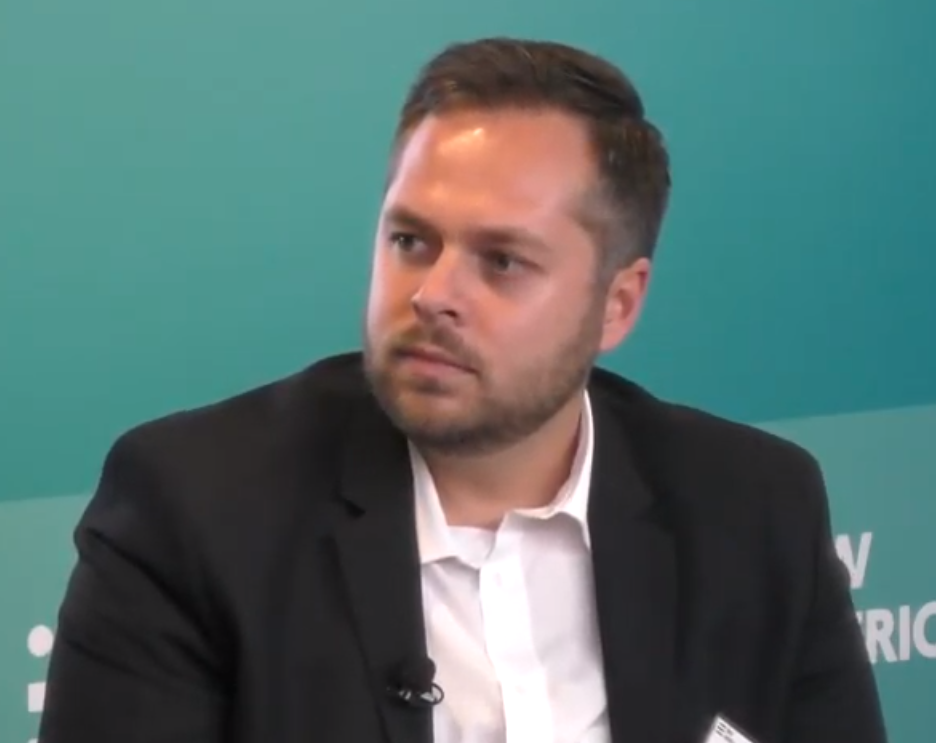
Schreiber during a New America seminar in May 2017

==== Cadre deployment ====
As Shadow Minister of Public Service and Administration, Schreiber was best known for his attacks on the cadre deployment policy of the governing ANC. In February 2021, he tabled a private member's bill, the Public Administration Laws General Amendment Bill, which the DA nicknamed the End Cadre Deployment Bill. Introduced by Schreiber during the State of the Nation Address debate, it included several measures to enforce meritocracy in the public service, including criminal prohibitions against political interference in non-political appointments, prohibitions against holding political office while employed in the public service, and increased protections for the independence of the Public Service Commission. In September 2023, the bill was defeated in the National Assembly by 201 votes to 123, despite support from several other opposition parties. The ANC concurred with the Portfolio Committee on Public Service's finding that the bill conflicted with existing policy initiatives on the professionalisation of the public service.

Meanwhile, in January 2022, the State Capture Commission published minutes of meetings of the ANC's internal cadre deployment committee. During a media briefing on 12 January 2022, Schreiber announced that the DA would submit formal complaints to the Public Service Commission on the basis that the minutes revealed party-political interference in public appointments. Schreiber said that, based on the DA's analysis of the minutes, cadre deployment had continued "unabated" under the incumbent President, Cyril Ramaphosa.

Schreiber also led the DA's campaign to gain access to further records from the ANC cadre deployment committee. After a prolonged court battle, the DA received the records in February 2024 pursuant to a Constitutional Court order in ANC v Schreiber. Schreiber congratulated his party on "piercing the ANC's veil of cadre secrets", saying that, "the ANC has been forced to bend the knee before the DA". However, later the same month, the Pretoria High Court dismissed a related application by the DA to have the ANC's cadre deployment policy declared unconstitutional.

==== Stellenbosch University ====
Schreiber's DA constituency was Stellenbosch, and during the parliamentary term he was a prominent activist in connection with ongoing debate about Stellenbosch University's language policy. In October 2019, he resigned from the university's Institutional Forum in protest of its 2016 language policy, which preferred English over Afrikaans as the medium of instruction; Schreiber said that he would not "be complicit in the takeover of our society" and in the suppression of indigenous languages. In November 2020 he promised an "unprecedented campaign" to fight for the reversal of the language policy, and in March 2021 he launched a public petition in that vein, calling for the protection of language rights "against persistent attacks by university management". He accused the university administration, under Rector Wim de Villiers, of being "anti-Afrikaans".

Also in early 2021, Schreiber led the DA in filing a complaint against Stellenbosch University with the South African Human Rights Commission (SAHRC), alleging that it was a rights violation for the university's residences to institute rules prohibiting conversations in Afrikaans in certain common spaces. The SAHRC found against the university in March 2023. The SAHRC complaint stimulated extensive public debate, with Schreiber's critics accusing him of "cheap politicking", of needlessly polarising rhetoric, of resorting to racist dog whistles, and of reinforcing a false dichotomy between anti-racism and the promotion of Afrikaans.

=== Minister of Home Affairs: 2024–present ===
Schreiber was re-elected to his seat in the National Assembly in the May 2024 general election, ranked 16th on the DA's national party list. On 30 June, in line with a coalition agreement between the DA and ANC, President Ramaphosa announced that he is to be appointed the cabinet as Minister of Home Affairs. The ANC's Njabulo Nzuza was appointed as his deputy. In the aftermath of the cabinet announcement, there were false reports that Schreiber was born in Zimbabwe, stemming from the circulation on social media of a vandalised Wikipedia article about him.

After he was sworn in as minister on 3 July 2024, Schreiber said that his initial priority in the Department of Home Affairs would be "getting the basics right", reducing backlogs through technological interventions and business process reforms. He also expressed support for improving access to visas for skilled immigrants, as well as for a "zero tolerance" approach to corruption.

== Publications ==
- Schreiber, Leon Amos (2014). "Institutions and Policy Change: The Development of the Child Support Grant in South Africa". Politikon. 41 (2): 267–288. doi:10.1080/02589346.2014.905258. ISSN 0258-9346.
- Schreiber, Leon (2018). Coalition Country: South Africa After the ANC. NB Publishers Limited. ISBN 978-0-624-08394-8.

Political offices
| Preceded by Désirée van der Walt | Shadow Minister of Public Service and Administration; 2019–2024 | Incumbent |
