= Terri Stander =

South African politician

Councillor Terri Stander

Shadow Deputy Minister of Women in the Presidency
- In office 1 January 2017 – 7 May 2019
- Leader: Mmusi Maimane
- Preceded by: Nomsa Marchesi
- Succeeded by: Nazley Sharif

Shadow Deputy Minister of Public Enterprises
- In office 3 October 2015 – 1 January 2017
- Leader: Mmusi Maimane
- Preceded by: Erik Marais
- Succeeded by: Erik Marais

Shadow Deputy Minister of Environmental Affairs
- In office 5 June 2014 – 3 October 2015
- Leader: Mmusi Maimane
- Preceded by: Francois Rodgers
- Succeeded by: Johni Edwards

Member of the National Assembly of South Africa
- In office 21 May 2014 – 7 May 2019

Personal details
- Born: Terri Stander
- Party: Democratic Alliance (2009–present)
- Other party: African National Congress (former)
- Education: Port Alfred High School
- Alma mater: University of South Africa (BA)

Terri Stander is the ward councillor for ward 5 in Nelson Mandela Bay. She is a former Member of Parliament (MP) for the Democratic Alliance (DA), South Africa's official opposition.

== Background ==
Stander matriculated from Port Alfred High School in 2000. She then worked for Norufin Housing (Pty) Ltd (Housing Finance Provider) from 2001 to 2005. She holds a BA degree in Applied Psychology for Professional Contexts from the University of South Africa. Stander worked as a Human Resources Officer at the Central District Municipality in the North West between October 2005 to August 2006. In 2007, Stander started her own labour law consultancy, HR Solutions. She wrote columns for AVUSA, discussing HR and IR matters. She is a former African National Congress member. She joined the ANC after being recruited while she worked at CDM. She did not renew her membership after 2007 citing issues with the party’s growing reputation of involvement in corruption.

In 2009, Stander participated in the Democratic Alliance's Young Leaders Programme. After finishing the programme, she became a party member and was elected as a branch chairperson in Port Alfred. Stander was elected as a proportional representative (PR) councillor for the DA in the Ndlambe Local Municipality in 2011. She was elected Eastern Cape Association of Democratic Alliance Councillors (ADAC) Chairperson and served on the Provincial Executive Committee and Federal Council for the period 2012 to 2014.

== Parliamentary career ==
In 2014, Stander was placed fourth on the DA's list of Eastern Cape candidates and 37th on the DA's national list for the National Assembly. She was elected to the National Assembly from the DA's national list. Parliamentary Leader Mmusi Maimane appointed Stander to the position of Shadow Deputy Minister of Environmental Affairs.

On 3 October 2015, DA Leader Mmusi Maimane appointed Stander as Shadow Deputy Minister of Public Enterprises. She was appointed Shadow Deputy Minister of Women on 24 November 2016. Her appointment took effect on 1 January 2017.

On 19 July 2018, Stander opened a fraud and corruption case against Enoch Mgijima Local Municipality mayor Sisisi Tolashe, her predecessor Lindiwe Gunuza-Nkwentsha and other municipal officials. Stander said that she had singled them out because the municipality had failed to deliver services and that corruption had increased under their watch.

In 2019, Stander stood for re-election at 123rd on the DA's national list and 11th on the DA's Eastern Cape candidate list. She was not re-elected to parliament as the DA's electoral support decreased.

== Post-parliamentary career ==
In September 2021, Stander was announced as the DA's ward councillor candidate for ward 5 in the Nelson Mandela Bay Metropolitan Municipality for the local government elections on 1 November 2021. She was elected at the election.
