= Michael Cardo =

South African author and politician

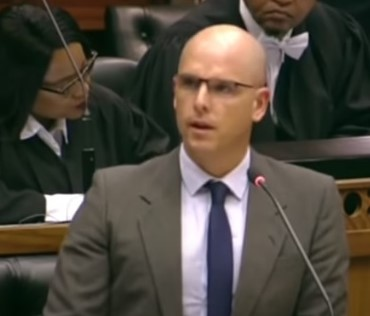

Shadow Minister of Employment and Labour
- In office 5 June 2019 – 31 January 2024
- Deputy: Michael Bagraim
- Leader: Mmusi Maimane; John Steenhuisen
- Preceded by: Position established

Shadow Minister of Economic Development
- In office 18 June 2015 – 5 June 2019
- Deputy: Patrick Atkinson
- Leader: Mmusi Maimane
- Preceded by: Kobus Marais
- Succeeded by: Position abolished

Member of the National Assembly of South Africa
- In office 21 May 2014 – 31 January 2024

Personal details
- Born: Michael John Cardo; 28 June 1977 (age 48)
- Party: Democratic Alliance
- Profession: Author; Politician

Michael John Cardo (born 28 June 1977) is a South African author and politician who served as the Shadow Minister of Employment and Labour from June 2019 until February 2024. He was elected to the National Assembly of South Africa in May 2014. Between June 2015 and June 2019, he was the Shadow Minister of Economic Development. He resigned from Parliament effective on 31 January 2024. Cardo is a member of the Democratic Alliance.

== Early life and education ==
Cardo was born in 1977 in Durban. He holds a BA Honours in history from the University of Natal. He has an MPhil and a PhD in history from the University of Cambridge. While studying at Cambridge, he attended Trinity College.

== Political career ==
In 2003, Cardo joined the political staff of the Democratic Alliance and worked as a chief of staff in the office of the DA leader Tony Leon. Between 2004 and 2006, he served as the national director of research for the party. During the 2009 general election campaign, Cardo worked as Helen Zille's speechwriter.

He was then employed in the policy and strategy unit of the department of the premier in the Western Cape government between 2011 and 2014.

== Parliamentary career ==
Prior to the 7 May 2014 general election, Cardo was selected as a DA parliamentary candidate. At the election, he won a seat in the National Assembly. He was sworn in as a Member of Parliament on 21 May 2014. Having entered parliament, he was assigned to the Portfolio Committee on Public Service and Administration, Performance Monitoring & Evaluation and the Standing Committee on the Auditor-General in June 2014.

The DA parliamentary leader, Mmusi Maimane, appointed him Shadow Minister of Economic Development on 18 June 2015. He became a member of that specific portfolio's committee on 25 June 2015. On 17 September 2015, he left the public service portfolio committee. He relinquished his membership on the Standing Committee on the Auditor-General on 23 November 2015, meaning that his only committee assignment for the remainder of the term was the Portfolio Committee on Economic Development.

Cardo was re-elected for a second term in May 2019. In June 2019, he became the Shadow Minister of Employment and Labour. He became a member of the Portfolio Committee on Employment and Labour later that month.

Cardo remained in his post as shadow employment and labour minister in John Steenhuisen's Shadow Cabinet.

Cardo resigned from Parliament on 31 January 2024.

== Personal life ==
Cardo is one of a number of openly LGBTQ+ members of parliament.

Cardo was awarded a Visiting Research Fellowship at the Helen Suzman Foundation in 2006.

== Publications ==
- Cardo, Michael (2010). Opening Men's Eyes: Peter Brown And The Liberal Struggle For South Africa. ISBN 9781868423927
