= Tsepo Mhlongo =

South African politician

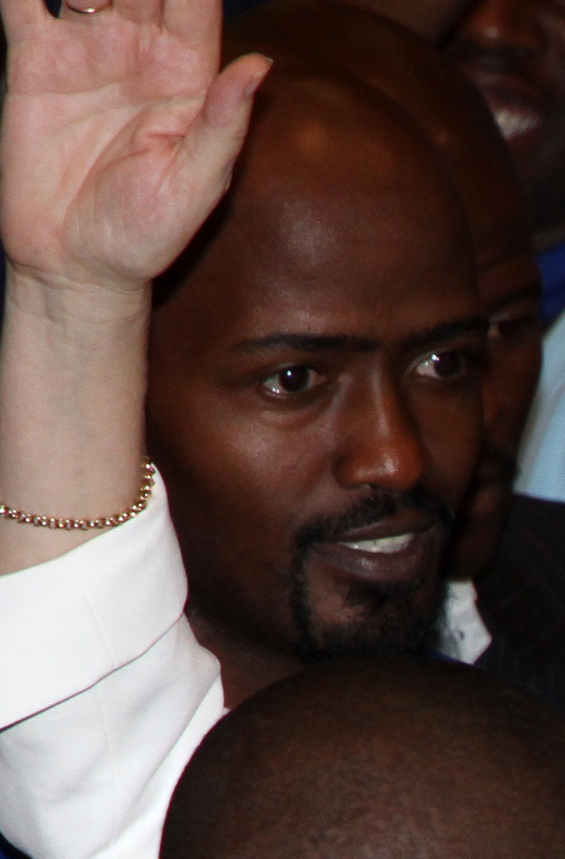
- Mhlongo in 2011

Shadow Minister of Sports, Arts and Culture
- In office 5 June 2019 – 1 December 2023
- Deputy: Veronica van Dyk
- Leader: Mmusi Maimane; John Steenhuisen
- Preceded by: Position established

Shadow Minister of Sport and Recreation
- In office 1 January 2017 – 5 June 2019
- Deputy: Darren Bergman
- Leader: Mmusi Maimane
- Preceded by: Solly Malatsi
- Succeeded by: Position abolished

Shadow Deputy Minister of Rural Development and Land Reform
- In office 5 June 2014 – 1 January 2017
- Leader: Mmusi Maimane
- Preceded by: Kevin Mileham
- Succeeded by: Thandeka Mbabama

Member of the National Assembly of South Africa
- In office 21 May 2014 – 1 December 2023

Personal details
- Born: Tsepo Winston Mhlongo
- Party: ActionSA (2023–present)
- Other party: Democratic Alliance (2000–2023); Democratic Party (1998–2000)
- Profession: Politician

Tsepo Winston Mhlongo is a South African politician. As former member of the Democratic Alliance, he served as a councillor in the City of Johannesburg until the 2014 national election, when he was elected to the National Assembly of South Africa. After that, he was appointed Shadow Deputy Minister of Rural Development and Land Reform. Mhlongo became the Shadow Minister of Sport and Recreation in January 2017 before he was selected to be Shadow Minister of Sports, Arts and Culture in June 2019. On 1 December 2023, Mhlongo was expelled from the DA and lost his parliamentary membership. He has since joined ActionSAfor 8 months and 2024 he joined BABSA as Deputy President.

== Early life and education ==
Mhlongo was elected to the student representative council of Matseliso Secondary School when he was in matric. In 1996, he enrolled for a Bachelor of Commerce (BCom) degree at the University of South Africa, but he couldn't complete the course due to financial constraints. Mhlongo then did an advanced diploma in ministerial training at the Faithways Bible Training Centre in 1997. He achieved an advanced certificate in municipal governance from the University of Johannesburg in 2007. In 2008, he fulfilled a course on finance for non-financial managers at Wits Business School. Mhlongo did a certificate program in management development on municipal finance at the Wits Business School in 2010. In 2016, he obtained a certificate in governance and public leadership from the Wits School of Governance. Mhlongo is currently pursuing a postgraduate diploma in governance at the Wits School of Governance.

== Political career ==
In 1998, Mhlongo joined the Democratic Party structures in Soweto. He joined the Democratic Alliance, when it was formed in 2000. He was then appointed a shadow councillor candidate for the Greater Johannesburg region, representing Orlando East.

At the 2006 municipal election, he was elected as a PR councillor in the City of Johannesburg Metropolitan Municipality. Mhlongo has been a member of the DA's Johannesburg regional executive committee, the Gauteng provincial executive committee, and the Federal Council.

== Parliamentary career ==
Mhlongo became a parliamentary candidate for the party in the 8 May 2014 general elections. He appeared eighteenth on the DA's Gauteng list, thus qualifying for a seat in Parliament as the DA retained its status as official opposition. He was sworn in on 21 May. On 5 June 2014, he was appointed as Shadow Deputy Minister of Rural Development and Land Reform by Mmusi Maimane, the DA parliamentary leader.

On 24 November 2016, Mhlongo was selected to be the Shadow Minister of Sport and Recreation, replacing Solly Malatsi. His appointment took effect on 1 January 2017.

For the 8 May 2019 national and provincial elections, he was the 89th candidate on the DA's national list, the 27th candidate on the DA's regional list, and the 57th candidate on the DA's provincial list. At the election, it appeared that Mhlongo had lost his seat in the National Assembly. However, fellow DA MP Gwen Ngwenya declined her seat and the DA chose Mhlongo to fill it. He was sworn in along with all the other Members of Parliament on 22 May 2019. On 5 June 2019, he was appointed as Shadow Minister of Sports, Arts and Culture by Maimane.

Maimane resigned as DA leader in October 2019 and John Steenhuisen was voted in as his interim successor in November. He inherited Maimane's shadow cabinet. The DA then decided to hold a leadership conference in 2020 to elect new leadership. Steenhuisen started his leadership campaign in February 2020 with Mhlongo publicly endorsing his leadership campaign early on. Following the resignation of Funzela Ngobeni as the DA's Johannesburg regional chairperson in March 2020, Mhlongo was elected as his acting successor.

In April 2020, Mhlongo called for Danny Jordaan, the president of the South Africa Football Association (Safa) president, to be suspended and said that he "is not fit to lead Safa in this era". He also criticised the organisation. In August, Safa and Jordaan demanded that Mhlongo apologise and retract the remarks or face legal action. Mhlongo dismissed it as a "desperate attempt to silence" him.

After John Steenhuisen was elected DA leader for a full term in November, he announced his Shadow Cabinet in December 2020, in which Mhlongo was reappointed as Shadow Minister of Sports, Arts and Culture.

On 1 December 2023, Mhlongo was expelled from the DA after he was found guilty of plotting to defraud the party's electoral systems ahead of the 2024 national and provincial elections. He lost his membership of the National Assembly as a result. He then accused DA leader Steenhuisen and Manny de Freitas of using party money to fund Steenhuisen's leadership campaigns. The DA has since said that the party would take legal action against Mhlongo. On 7 December 2023, Mhlongo joined ActionSA.

== Incident ==
In August 2020, Mhlongo was accused of shopping for alcohol during an online parliamentary session after a brief video of him flashed across the screens with a trolley behind him filled with what appeared to be bottles of alcohol. He denied that he was buying alcohol and said that he was buying groceries at Pick n Pay.
