= Baxolile Nodada =

South African politician

Baxolile Nodada MP

Deputy Chief Whip of the Democratic Alliance in the National Assembly
- Incumbent
- Assumed office 11 July 2024
- Leader: John Steenhuisen
- Chief Whip: George Michalakis
- Preceded by: Annelie Lotriet (Official Opposition)

Parliamentary Counsellor to the Leader of the Opposition
- In office 5 December 2020 – 14 June 2024
- Leader: John Steenhuisen
- Preceded by: Solly Malatsi
- Succeeded by: Position vacant

Shadow Minister of Basic Education
- In office 5 December 2020 – 14 June 2024
- Leader: John Steenhuisen
- Preceded by: Nomsa Marchesi
- Succeeded by: Position vacant

Shadow Deputy Minister of Higher Education, Science and Technology
- In office 5 June 2019 – 5 December 2020
- Leader: Mmusi Maimane; John Steenhuisen
- Preceded by: Position established
- Succeeded by: Annelie Lotriet

Member of the National Assembly of South Africa
- Incumbent
- Assumed office 22 May 2019
- Constituency: Eastern Cape

Personal details
- Born: Baxolile Babongile Nodada; 2 April 1992 (age 34) Aliwal North, Cape Province, South Africa
- Party: Democratic Alliance
- Education: Hudson Park High School; Nelson Mandela University (BA, BA(Hons))

Baxolile Babongile Nodada (born 2 April 1992) is a South African politician for the Democratic Alliance who has been a Member of Parliament since 2019. He served as the Shadow Minister of Basic Education and the Parliamentary Counsellor to the Leader of the Opposition in John Steenhuisen's Shadow Cabinet from 2020 until the DA entered national government in July 2024.

Nodada was Shadow Deputy Minister of Higher Education, Science and Technology in Mmusi Maimane's Shadow Cabinet.

== Early life and education ==
Nodada was born in 1992 in Aliwal North in South Africa's former Cape Province. His parents divorced in 1993, and he then grew up with his three siblings in a family headed by his mother.

He attended Hudson Park High School in East London, Eastern Cape, where he served on the Representative Council of Learners (RCL). After matriculating from the school in 2010, Nodada enrolled at the Nelson Mandela University. He joined the Democratic Alliance's student organisation on campus and served as the first chairperson of its South Campus branch. In 2013, he was elected to the university's Student Representative Council (SRC).

During his time as an SRC member, he held the positions of deputy secretary-general, culture officer, secretary-general and chief whip. He was DASO's campaign manager at the university in 2014 and 2015, respectively. In 2015, Nodada was given the SRC Member of the Year Leadership Award by the Vice Chancellor.

Nodada graduated with a BA degree in political science and economics in 2014 and an honours degree in public administration and conflict in 2015.

== Political career ==
In 2016, Nodada was elected as the youngest councillor in the Nelson Mandela Bay Metropolitan Municipality. He was assigned to the budget and treasury as well as economic development committees. Nodada graduated from the DA's Young Leader Programme in 2018.

In 2019, Nodada stood for election to the South African National Assembly as 54th on the DA's national list and 5th on the DA's regional-to-national list. At the election held on 8 May 2019, Nodada won a seat in parliament. He took his seat on 22 May. In the following days, he was appointed as Shadow Deputy Minister of Higher Education, Science and Technology by Mmusi Maimane. Maimane resigned as DA leader in October 2019 and John Steenhuisen was elected interim party leader. Steenhuisen temporarily retained Maimane's shadow cabinet, keeping Nodada in his position.

Nodada supported Steenhuisen's campaign to become party leader for a full term ahead of the DA's Federal Congress on 31 October and 1 November 2020. Following Steenhuisen's victory, Nodada was promoted to Shadow Minister of Basic Education and Parliamentary Counsellor to the Leader of the Opposition. On 11 December 2020, Nodada said that the North Gauteng High Court's decision to set aside the rewriting of two leaked matric exam papers painted a "damning picture" of the Department of Basic Education's "incompetence".

On 7 April 2021, Nodada became a non-voting member of the Committee for Section 194 Enquiry, which will determine if Busisiwe Mkhwebane should be removed as Public Protector. He became a voting member on 21 June 2021 as the committee's composition was reconstituted.

On 9 March 2022, Nodada said that it should be rather be optional than mandatory for school learners to wear masks. He said: "On a risk-based approach, the current requirement is irrational. In South Africa’s current context, the negative impact of a mandatory mask policy exceeds the positive impact."

Nodada was re-elected to the National Assembly in the 2024 general election. The DA entered into a coalition agreement with the ANC which saw his tenure as Shadow Minister come to an end.
