= Thamsanqa Mabhena =

South African politician

Thamsanqa Mabhena MP

Member of the National Assembly of South Africa
- Incumbent
- Assumed office 22 May 2019

Personal details
- Born: 1 June 1990 (age 35)
- Party: Democratic Alliance
- Education: Master of Business Administration (MBA)
- Alma mater: University of Johannesburg
- Occupation: Member of Parliament
- Profession: Politician
- Committees: Transport & CoGTA

Thamsanqa (Thami) Bhekokwakhe Mabhena (born 1 June 1990) is a South African politician. He is currently a Member of Parliament (MP) for the Democratic Alliance (DA). Mabhena served as the Shadow Deputy Minister of Transport between 2019 and 2024.

== Political career ==
In 2008, Mabhena formed part of the establishment of the Democratic Alliance branch in his village in Mpumalanga. He was then appointed the founding DA Youth representative. Mabhena was the transport coordinator of the DA's Dr JS Moroka Constituency for the 2009 general election and became a member of the DA Youth provincial council later that same year. In 2010, Mabhena was appointed as the secretary for the Dr JS Moroka Constituency. He was elected deputy chairperson of the DA Youth in the constituency in 2012.

Mabhena then moved to Gauteng. In 2014, Mabhena was appointed the youth representative of the DA's Hlanganani constituency in Johannesburg. He became the constituency officer of the party's Johannesburg Central constituency and was named the DA's Johannesburg regional coordinator responsible for telecanvassing in 2015. Between 2015 and the August 2016 municipal elections, he was the logistics events coordinator of Herman Mashaba's mayoral campaign. Mabhena was elected as a DA PR councillor in the City of Johannesburg at the elections. He was elected chairperson of the Hlanganani constituency in 2017.

== Parliamentary career ==
Mabhena stood for election to the National Assembly of South Africa at the May 2019 general election as a candidate on the DA's national list. He entered the National Assembly as the DA retained its position as the official opposition. On 5 June 2019, he was appointed Shadow Deputy Minister of Transport. On 2 July 2019, Mabhena nominated Shadow Transport Minister Chris Hunsinger to become chairperson of the Portfolio Committee on Transport after saying that it is important that they "have a chairperson with integrity." Hunsinger lost to Mosebenzi Zwane, a former Free State MEC for Agriculture, who is also accused of state capture.

In November 2020, Mabhena called on the national minister of transport, Fikile Mbalula, to "step off Twitter" and deal with his department and the processing of COVID-19 relief funds to the taxi industry. He remained as Shadow Deputy Minister of Transport in the Shadow Cabinet of John Steenhuisen.

Mabhena was re-elected to a second term in the National Assembly in the 2024 general election.
