= Patrick Atkinson =

South African politician

Patrick Atkinson MPL

Member of the Gauteng Provincial Legislature
- Incumbent
- Assumed office 10 February 2022

Member of the National Assembly of South Africa
- In office 21 May 2014 – 7 May 2019

Shadow Deputy Minister of Economic Development
- In office 5 June 2014 – 7 May 2019
- Preceded by: Andricus van der Westhuizen
- Succeeded by: Position abolished

Personal details
- Born: Patrick George Atkinson
- Party: Democratic Alliance
- Profession: Politician

Patrick George Atkinson is a South African politician who has served as a Democratic Alliance Member of the Gauteng Provincial Legislature. Previously he served as a City of Johannesburg municipal councillor from 2019 to 2022 and as the Shadow Deputy Minister of Economic Development and as a Member of the National Assembly of South Africa between 2014 and 2019.

== Parliamentary career ==
Prior to the 7 May 2014 general election, Atkinson was ranked 70th on the Democratic Alliance's national list and 20th on its regional Gauteng list. At the election, Atkinson won a seat in the National Assembly. He was sworn in as a Member of Parliament on 21 May 2014.

On 5 June 2014, the DA parliamentary leader Mmusi Maimane appointed him as the Shadow Deputy Minister of Economic Development, deputising for Kobus Marais. He became a member of the Portfolio Committee on Economic Development on 20 June 2014.

In 2018, his committee attendance rate was 93%. Atkinson was placed 34th on the DA's provincial list for the 2019 Gauteng Provincial Legislature election. He was not elected as the DA only won 20 seats in the legislature. Atkinson did not return to the National Assembly.

== Post-parliamentary career ==
Soon after the 2019 election, Atkinson was sworn in as a PR councillor for the DA in Johannesburg. On 17 March 2020, he was announced as the DA's shadow MMC (member of the mayoral committee) for finance.

On 10 February 2022, he was sworn in as a DA Member of the Gauteng Provincial Legislature. He serves on the Finance Committee.

== Personal life ==
Atkinson is openly gay.
