= Njabulo Nzuza =

South African politician (born 1982)

Njabulo Nzuza MP

Deputy Minister of Home Affairs
- Incumbent
- Assumed office 29 May 2019
- President: Cyril Ramaphosa
- Preceded by: Fatima Chohan

Member of the National Assembly of South Africa
- Incumbent
- Assumed office 22 May 2019
- Constituency: KwaZulu-Natal

Personal details
- Born: Njabulo Bheka Nzuza; 20 February 1982 (age 44)
- Party: African National Congress
- Education: University of Zululand

Njabulo Bheka Nzuza (born 20 February 1982) is a South African politician from KwaZulu-Natal currently serving as Deputy Minister of Home Affairs. He has been a Member of Parliament since 2019. Nzuza is a member of the African National Congress.

== Early life, education and early career ==
Nzuza was born on 20 February 1982. He holds a BCom in Economics from the University of Zululand and a certificate in corporate funding strategies: JSE. He worked as the economic development senior manager for the uThungulu District Municipality (now known as the King Cetshwayo District Municipality).

== Political career ==
Nzuza served as the deputy regional chairperson of the African National Congress Youth League in the Musa Dladla Region from 2001 to 2002. Between 2002 and 2004, he was a member of the Student Representative Council of the University of Zululand. In 2004, he was elected provincial secretary of the South African Students Congress (SASCO), a position he held until 2005. Nzuza served as the regional secretary of the ANC youth league in the Musa Dladla Region from 2013 to 2015.

At the ANC youth league's elective conference in 2015, Nzuza was elected secretary-general. He was then made a member of the ANC's national executive committee (NEC). In 2018, he was elected to serve on the Provincial Executive Committee of the ANC in KwaZulu-Natal. In that same year, he vacated the position of ANCYL Secretary-General.

== National government ==
Nzuza was elected as a Member of Parliament in the National Assembly of South Africa in the 2019 national and provincial elections. on 29 May 2019, he was appointed Deputy Minister of Home Affairs by president Cyril Ramaphosa.

== Personal life ==
On 28 May 2020, Nzuza was hijacked in Midrand by at least two gunmen. They forced him to withdraw money at various ATMs before dropping him off in Mamelodi West. They then stole his blue Range Rover, two cellphones and his wallet.

On 30 December 2020, the Minister of Home Affairs, Aaron Motsoaledi, announced that Nzuza had tested positive for COVID-19 during the COVID-19 pandemic in South Africa.

Political offices
Preceded by Fatima Chohan	Deputy Minister of Home Affairs; 2019–	Succeeded by Incumbent
