= Henro Krüger =

South African politician

Henro Krüger MP

Member of the National Assembly of South Africa
- Incumbent
- Assumed office 21 May 2014

Personal details
- Born: Hendrik Christiaan Crafford Krüger; 6 May 1962 (age 63)
- Party: Democratic Alliance
- Occupation: Member of Parliament
- Profession: Politician

Hendrik Christiaan Crafford Krüger (born 6 May 1962) is a South African politician who has been a Member of the National Assembly of South Africa since 2014, representing the Democratic Alliance.

== Education ==
Krüger holds a postgraduate diploma in Business Management and is currently pursuing a Master of Business Administration.

== Political career ==
He served as a Democratic Alliance councillor in the Emalahleni Local Municipality of Mpumalanga from 2006 to 2014.

== Parliamentary career ==
Krüger stood as a DA parliamentary candidate from Mpumalanga in the 2014 national elections, and was subsequently elected to the National Assembly and sworn in on 21 May 2014. On 5 June 2014, he was appointed Shadow Deputy Minister of Small Business Development in the new shadow cabinet led by Mmusi Maimane. Krüger became a member of the Portfolio Committee on Small Business Development on 20 June.

Between 17 September 2015 and 8 December 2016, he was an alternate member of the Portfolio Committee on Agriculture, Forestry and Fisheries. Krüger returned to the committee on 2 March 2017 and served until the dissolution of the parliamentary term on 7 May 2019.

After the general election on 8 May 2019, Krüger was selected to return to the National Assembly. He was reappointed as Shadow Deputy Minister of Small Business Development on 5 June 2019 by Maimane.

In March 2020, parliament published a notice of Krüger's intention to introduce the Ease of Doing Business Bill, a private member bill from the DA, which aims to develop a plan to reduce red tape for businesses that want the enter the market place. Amid the COVID-19 pandemic in South Africa, he called for the re-opening of Pilates, yoga and other studios in July 2020. In December 2020, he was reappointed as Shadow Deputy Minister of Small Business Development in the shadow cabinet of the newly elected DA leader, John Steenhuisen.

Krüger was re-elected to a third term in the National Assembly in the 2024 general election.

== Personal life ==
Krüger has been a resident of Witbank for more than 30 years.
