= Michael Bagraim =

South African politician and labour lawyer

Michael Bagraim MP
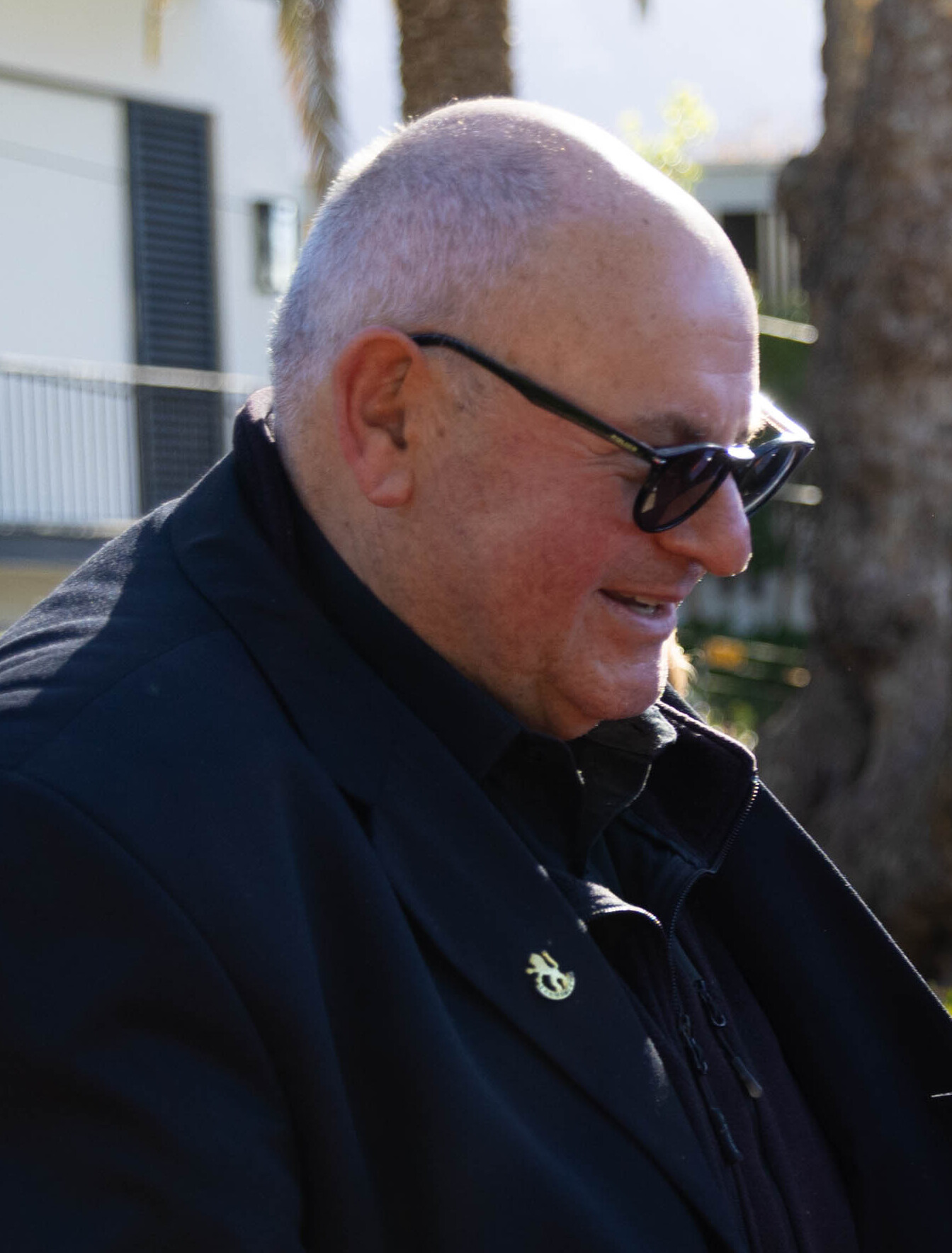
- Bagraim in 2025

Shadow Deputy Minister of Labour and Employment
- In office 5 June 2019 – 14 June 2024
- Leader: Mmusi Maimane; John Steenhuisen
- Preceded by: Post established
- Succeeded by: Post vacant

Shadow Minister of Labour
- In office 1 June 2017 – 5 June 2019
- Deputy: Derrick America
- Leader: Mmusi Maimane
- Preceded by: Ian Ollis
- Succeeded by: Post abolished

Shadow Deputy Minister of Labour
- In office 5 June 2014 – 1 June 2017
- Leader: Mmusi Maimane
- Preceded by: Haniff Hoosen
- Succeeded by: Derrick America

Member of the National Assembly of South Africa
- Incumbent
- Assumed office 21 May 2014

Personal details
- Born: Michael Bagraim; 9 October 1956 (age 69)
- Party: Democratic Alliance
- Education: Cape Town High School
- Alma mater: Rhodes University
- Occupation: Member of Parliament
- Profession: Labour lawyer Politician

Michael Bagraim (born 9 October 1956) is a South African politician and labour lawyer. A member of the Democratic Alliance, he was elected to the National Assembly in 2014. He was then appointed Shadow Deputy Minister of Labour. In 2017, Bagraim was promoted to Shadow Minister of Labour. After the 2019 election, he was made Shadow Deputy Minister of Labour and Employment.

== Background ==
Bagraim was born into a Jewish family in Cape Town. He matriculated from Cape Town High School before he went on to study at Rhodes University where he graduated with a BA degree in political science and an LLB degree. Bagraim served on the university's Student Representative Council (SRC) and represented Rhodes University on the Debating Society and Law Students' Association.

In 1982, Bagraim was admitted as an advocate. He was admitted as an attorney four years later. He then founded Michael Bagraim & Associates and worked as a consultant. Bagraim is trustee of the Cape Chamber of Commerce & Industries, the South African Jewish Board of Deputies and the MOSAIC – Training, Service and Healing Centre for Women.

== Political career ==
Bagraim stood as a Democratic Alliance parliamentary candidate from Western Cape in the 2014 national elections, and was subsequently elected to the National Assembly as the DA retained its position as the official opposition. Bagraim sworn in on 21 May 2014. On 5 June 2014, the DA parliamentary leader, Mmusi Maimane, appointed Bagraim as Shadow Deputy Minister of Labour, deputising for Ian Ollis. Later that month, he became a member of the Portfolio Committee on Labour.

On 1 June 2017, he was appointed Shadow Minister of Labour, replacing Ollis. Bagraim was re-elected to parliament in the 8 May 2019 general election. Soon after, he was appointed by Maimane to be Shadow Deputy Minister of Labour and Employment. Maimane resigned as DA leader in October 2019 and John Steenhuisen was elected to succeed him as interim leader. He temporarily retained Maimane's shadow cabinet.

Bagraim said in May 2020 that South Africa's labour legislation needs re-engineering, because the labour laws have "done nothing to enhance job creation". He argued in an opinion piece in September 2020 that the Unemployed Insurance Fund had failed the South African workforce during the COVID-19 pandemic.

After Steenhuisen was elected DA leader for a full term in November 2020, he announced his shadow cabinet in December 2020. Bagraim remained as Shadow Deputy Minister of Labour and Employment.

In the 2020 Register of Members’ Interests, Bagraim disclosed that he was a director of a labour law consulting firm.

Bagraim was re-elected to Parliament in the 2024 general election.

Political offices
Preceded by Position established	Shadow Deputy Minister of Labour and Employment; 2019–2024	Succeeded by Position vacant
Preceded by Ian Ollis	Shadow Minister of Labour; 2017–2019	Succeeded by Position abolished
Preceded by Haniff Hoosen	Shadow Deputy Minister of Labour; 2014–2017	Succeeded by Derrick America
