= Alf Lees =

South African politician

Robert Alfred Lees (born 25 October 1952) is a South African politician who has been a Member of Parliament (MP) for the Democratic Alliance (DA).

== Career ==
He was a member of the Shadow Cabinet of Mmusi Maimane. He sits on the Standing Committee on Public Accounts.
