= Mergan Chetty =

South African politician (born 1968)

Mergan Chetty MP

Member of Parliament from KwaZulu-Natal
- Incumbent
- Assumed office 22 May 2019

Personal details
- Born: 17 January 1968 (age 58)

Mergan Chetty (born 17 January 1968) is a South African politician and a Member of Parliament (MP) for the Democratic Alliance (DA).

He was elected to the National Assembly of South Africa in the 2019 South African general election.

Since June 2019, he served as the Shadow Deputy Minister of International Relations and Cooperation in the Shadow Cabinet of Mmusi Maimane. Following John Steenhuisen's election as leader of the DA, he was appointed to his shadow cabinet in the same position.

He has been a member of the Portfolio Committee on International Relations and Cooperation (National Assembly Committees) since 27 June 2019.

== Controversies ==
In 2017, The ANC KwaZulu-Natal laid charges of crimen injuria against Chetty after he was allegedly caught on tape using the term “makwerekwere,” a derogatory word used against foreigners of African origin.

In 2023, a voice note of a meeting between Chetty and other DA councillors was leaked to the Mail & Guardian. In the expletive laden recording, Chetty told DA councillors “if there was money (coming from municipal contractors)” it should rather be channeled to the DA constituency office as “the party has a right to take donations,” instead of them taking money as individuals.
