= Yusuf Cassim =

South African politician (born 1990)

The Honourable Yusuf Cassim MP

Deputy Minister of Higher Education
- Incumbent
- Assumed office 1 July 2026
- President: Cyril Ramaphosa
- Minister: Buti Manamela
- Preceded by: Mimmy Gondwe

Member of the National Assembly of South Africa
- Incumbent
- Assumed office 30 June 2026
- Preceded by: Kevin Mileham
- In office 21 May 2014 – 7 May 2019

Provincial Chairperson of the Democratic Alliance in the Eastern Cape
- Incumbent
- Assumed office 25 February 2023
- Preceded by: Andrew Whitfield

Member of the Eastern Cape Provincial Legislature
- In office 22 May 2019 – 29 June 2026

Personal details
- Born: 5 January 1990 (age 36) Uitenhage, Cape Province, South Africa
- Party: Democratic Alliance
- Spouse: Shaakira
- Education: Muir College
- Alma mater: Nelson Mandela University (BCom)
- Profession: Politician

Yusuf Cassim (born 5 January 1990) is a South African politician who has been the Deputy Minister of Higher Education and a Member of the National Assembly of South Africa since 2026, representing the Democratic Alliance, of which he serves as the party's provincial chairman in the Eastern Cape.

Cassim had previously served as a member of parliament between 2014 and 2019. He was a member of the Eastern Cape Provincial Legislature from 2019 until his appointment to national government in 2026.

== Early life and education ==
Cassim was born into an Muslim Indian family on 5 January 1990 in Uitenhage in the present-day Eastern Cape Province of South Africa. His parents are Dr Cassim Mahamed Cassim and Attiya Cassim. He attended Muir College and was captain of the school's debating team. He matriculated top of his matric class and went to study a Bachelor of Commerce in Accounting at Nelson Mandela Metropolitan University. At the time of his election as an MP in 2014, he was completing a master's degree in Public Administration.

== Political career ==
Cassim was chairperson of the Muslims' Students' Alliance during his first-year of university in 2009. In 2010, he founded the Democratic Alliance Student Organisation (DASO) at the Nelson Mandela Metropolitan Municipality. Three weeks before the student representative council (SRC) election, the structure was recognised. He was elected to the SRC and led the DASO caucus in opposition. At the next election in 2011, DASO won a majority and he was elected president of the SRC. He also completed the DA's Young Leaders Class in 2011. In 2013, Cassim was elected federal chairperson of the DA Youth.

=== Parliamentary career ===
Cassim successfully stood for election to the South African National Assembly in the 2014 general election, ranked 8th on the party's national candidate list. He became the youngest Member of Parliament in South African history when he was sworn in at the age of 24 years, four months and 16 days, breaking the record previously held by fellow DA MP Geordin Hill-Lewis. Shortly afterwards, he was named Shadow Deputy Minister of Higher Education and Training by the DA parliamentary leader, Mmusi Maimane.

In February 2015, the Deputy Ambassador of Israel to South Africa, Michael Freeman, wrote a letter to airport security at the Ben Gurion International Airport to not harass Cassim when he went through security during a study group tour of Israel, writing: "We implore you to treat Mr. Yusuf Cassim with generosity and respect during the security checks. Please pass it along to all security officials to check Mr. Yusuf Cassim in a way that will leave a good impression and preserve the good relations between the DA [Democratic Alliance, Cassim's party] and Israel." Despite the letter, Cassim experienced difficulties when he went through the security and had to call the Israeli ambassador to South Africa to let him go through the checkpoint. In a subsequent interview with Radio Islam, he called Israel an apartheid state.

In November 2016, Cassim was appointed Shadow Deputy Minister in the Presidency by Maimane. He was elected one of three deputy provincial chairpersons of the DA in May 2017.

=== Eastern Cape Provincial Legislature ===
Cassim was elected to the Eastern Cape Provincial Legislature in the 2019 provincial election. He became the youngest member of the provincial legislature when he was sworn in. He was appointed shadow Member of the Executive Council for the Education and Economic Development, Environmental Affairs and Tourism portfolios. In 2020, he was re-elected as a deputy provincial chairperson of the DA.

In 2023, Cassim was elected to succeed Andrew Whitfield as the DA Provincial Chairperson in the Eastern Cape. He was re-elected for another term in the provincial legislature in the 2024 provincial election; he was appointed chief whip by DA caucus leader Vicky Knoetze. He was re-elected as provincial chairperson in February 2026.

== National government ==
On 17 June 2026, DA leader Geordin Hill-Lewis wrote to President Cyril Ramaphosa requesting that he make changes to the DA appointments in his cabinets; one of these changes included appointing Cassim as the Deputy Minister of Higher Education, succeeding Mimmy Gondwe. Cassim described the nomination as a surprise and an honour. He subsequently vacated his seat in the provincial legislature to take up a seat in parliament again. On 30 June 2026, Ramaphosa acceded to Hill-Lewis's request and appointed Cassim to the role. He was sworn into office the following day. Cassim's appointment led to anti-Muslim and Islamophobic comments on The Presidency's social media post. Cassim's appointment was welcomed by the Minister of Higher Education, Buti Manamela.

== Personal life ==
Cassim is married to Shaakira.
