= Okkie Terblanche =

South African politician

Shadow Deputy Minister of Police
- In office 5 June 2019 – 14 June 2024
- Leader: John Steenhuisen; Mmusi Maimane
- Preceded by: Dianne Kohler-Barnard

Member of the National Assembly of South Africa
- In office 22 May 2019 – 28 May 2024
- Constituency: Western Cape

Permanent delegate to the National Council of Provinces from the Western Cape
- In office 15 October 2015 – 7 May 2019

Personal details
- Born: Ockert Stefanus Terblanche; 10 July 1952 (age 73)
- Party: Democratic Alliance
- Occupation: Member of Parliament
- Profession: Politician

Ockert Stefanus "Okkie" Terblanche (born 10 July 1952) is a South African retired politician and retired police general who served as the Shadow Deputy Minister of Police and as a Member of the National Assembly from 2019 until retiring from politics in 2024. He represented the Western Cape in the National Council of Provinces (NCOP) from October 2015 to May 2019. Terblanche is a member of the Democratic Alliance (DA).

== Career ==
Terblanche was a police officer of the South African Police Service (SAPS) and served as a major general until 2010. He relocated to the town of Mossel Bay and campaigned for the DA during the 2011 South African municipal elections. He was later elected chair of the DA branch in ward 10 of the municipality.

In October 2015, the DA caucus in the Western Cape Provincial Parliament nominated him to become a party representative in the NCOP, the upper house of the South African parliament. He was confirmed as a permanent delegate on 15 October. He served as a permanent delegate until the 2019 general election when he was elected to the lower house, the National Assembly. DA parliamentary leader Mmusi Maimane appointed him as the Shadow Deputy Police Minister on 5 June 2019. John Steenhuisen was elected parliamentary leader in October 2019. He kept Terblanche in his position.

In February 2022, Terblanche was appointed as electoral head of the DA's Oudtshoorn constituency.

Terblanche did not stand for re-election to the National Assembly at the 2024 general election and retired from politics at the election.
