= Michéle Clarke =

South African politician (born 1963)

Michéle Clarke MP
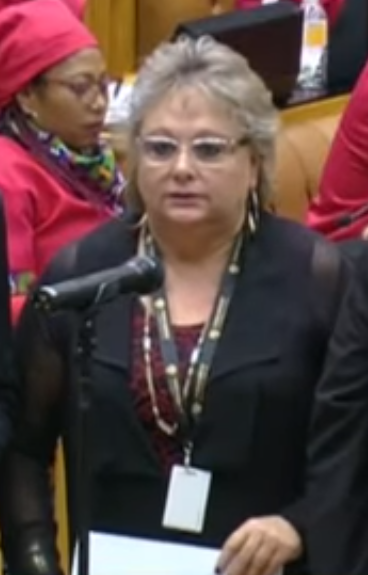
- Clarke in May 2019

Shadow Minister of Health
- In office 22 February 2022 – 14 July 2024
- Deputy: Lindy Wilson
- Leader: John Steenhuisen
- Preceded by: Siviwe Gwarube

Shadow Deputy Minister of Public Enterprises
- In office 5 December 2020 – 22 February 2022
- Leader: John Steenhuisen
- Shadow Minister: Ghaleb Cachalia
- Preceded by: Erik Marais
- Succeeded by: Farhat Essack

Shadow Deputy Minister of Public Service and Administration
- In office 5 June 2019 – 5 December 2020
- Leader: Mmusi Maimane; John Steenhuisen
- Succeeded by: Mimmy Gondwe

Member of the National Assembly of South Africa
- Incumbent
- Assumed office 22 May 2019

Member of the Gauteng Provincial Legislature
- In office 21 May 2014 – 7 May 2019

Personal details
- Born: 15 July 1963 (age 62) Florence Nightingale Clinic, Hillbrow, Johannesburg, Transvaal Province, South Africa
- Party: Democratic Alliance
- Relations: Tania Campbell (sister)
- Children: 2
- Occupation: Member of Parliament
- Profession: Politician

Michéle Odette Clarke (born 15 July 1963) is a South African politician. A member of the Democratic Alliance, Clarke served as a councillor in the Ekurhuleni Metropolitan Municipality from 2004 until her election to the Gauteng Provincial Legislature as a DA representative in 2014. After serving one term in the provincial legislature, Clarke was elected to the National Assembly of South Africa in 2019. Within the DA's Shadow Cabinet, she served as Shadow Deputy Minister of Public Service and Administration and as Shadow Deputy Minister of Public Enterprises before becoming Shadow Minister of health.

== Political career ==
Clarke joined the Democratic Party, the Democratic Alliance's predecessor, in 1997 and served as the chairperson of the party's branch in Bedfordview until 2000. Clarke soon became a member of the DA which was formed out of a merger of the DP and the New National Party in 2000. She was elected as the ward councillor for the Bedfordview Ward in the Ekurhuleni Metropolitan Municipality in a by-election in 2004. She was re-elected in 2006 and 2011. Clarke served as a whip and deputy chief whip of the DA caucus in the municipality.

Clarke was elected to the Gauteng Provincial Legislature at the provincial election held on 7 May 2014. She was sworn in as an MPL on 21 May 2014. She was assigned to the legislature's committees on community safety and education, and she was also appointed the party's spokesperson for community safety. Between November 2014 and November 2017, she served as deputy provincial chair of the party.

== Parliamentary career ==
Prior to the 8 May 2019 general elections, she was placed 12th on the DA's regional list, 65th on the party's provincial list and 45th on the party's national list. Clarke was elected to the National Assembly and took office as a Member of Parliament on 22 May 2019. On 5 June 2019, the DA parliamentary leader, Mmusi Maimane, appointed her as Shadow Deputy Minister of Public Service and Administration. Clarke became a member of that specific portfolio's parliamentary committee on 27 June 2019.

On 5 December 2020, Clarke was appointed as Shadow Deputy Minister of Public Enterprises by John Steenhuisen. On 7 December, she left the Portfolio Committee on Public Service and Administration, Performance Monitoring & Evaluation and became a member of the Portfolio Committee on Public Enterprises.

By February 2022, Clarke had been promoted to Shadow Minister of Health, succeeding Siviwe Gwarube, who left the position after she was elected deputy chief whip of the DA caucus in December 2021. She now serves on the Portfolio Committee on Health. Clarke is opposed to the National Health Insurance Bill which she has said will be "another SOE".

Clarke was re-elected to the National Assembly in the 2024 general election. Her tenure as Shadow Minister came to an end when the DA announced that it had entered into a coalition agreement with the ANC.

== Personal life ==
Clarke lives in Germiston with her husband. She has two children, a daughter and a son. Clarke holds a paralegal certificate.

Her sister is Tania Campbell, who is the former mayor of Ekurhuleni.
