= Ian Ollis =

South African politician (born 1970)

Ian Ollis MP
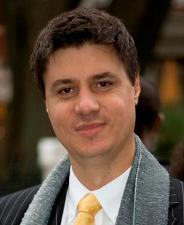

Member of the National Assembly
- In office 6 May 2009 – August 2018

Personal details
- Born: East London, South Africa
- Party: Democratic Alliance
- Website: ianollis.com https://www.linkedin.com/in/ianollis/

Ian Ollis (born 1970) is a South African politician who served in the National Assembly of South Africa.

He was a member of the Democratic Alliance, and previously held the positions of Shadow Minister of Transport and Shadow Minister of Labour in parliament.

== Early life and education ==
Ollis was born in East London, Eastern Cape, South Africa in 1970 and matriculated at the Cambridge High School. He completed his education through the Baptist Theological College, University of Zululand and his Master of Arts degree at Wits University in Johannesburg.

Having completed four years in seminary, Ollis was ordained and served in the Christian ministry in Johannesburg for six years before becoming an estate agent. He has worked as a sessional lecturer at the Wits College of Education, and has trained staff of real estate companies, political formations and religious institutions.

== Political life ==
Ollis joined the Democratic Party in 1998 and served in its various formations, including the 1999 parliamentary election campaign, before being elected to the City Council of Johannesburg for the renamed DA in 2005 and then re-elected as a ward councillor in 2006. He has worked in the party's fundraising department and served on the Gauteng South Regional executive.

In 2009, Ollis was elected a member of Parliament and currently serves as the party's Shadow Minister of Labour, the political head of the Sandton Constituency and was the Deputy Chairman of the Gauteng Executive of the DA.

In October 2010, Ollis submitted a Private Members' Bill that would hold unions accountable for violence and damage to property caused during strikes. On 15 November 2011, the Department of Labour announced that amendments would be made to the corresponding Act, in a proposal similar to the DA's.

Throughout his term as Shadow Labour Minister, Ollis has been at the forefront of the quest to reduce endemic unemployment in South Africa.

Ollis has been a strong supporter of LGBT rights in South Africa and globally. He was the first openly gay politician in all of Africa, according to the Guardian. Ollis served as a non-executive director of Joburg Pride for a number of years and continues to support LGBTQI rights in the US.

In February 2011, Ollis issued a statement on the proposed amendments to the Employment Equity Act, citing that the legislative changes would be unconstitutional and create "massive problems" if implemented.

In October 2011, Ollis submitted a private member's bill to amend the Compensation for Occupational Injuries and Diseases Act to expand the Compensation Fund's coverage to include domestic workers.

From 1 February 2012 until April 2014, Ian Ollis served as the Shadow Transport Minister in the Parliament of South Africa. He drafted the Democratic Alliance's new Transportation Policy approved in November 2013.

== Mid-career study sabbatical ==
In August 2018, Ollis resigned his seat in Parliament to complete a second master's degree at the Massachusetts Institute of Technology (and Harvard). He completed a Masters in City Planning degree with a Transportation Specialization in May 2020.

In mid-2019, Ollis took up a summer internship at the Pioneer Institute, a research and policy institution in Boston, writing and publishing detailed policy papers for the Institute.

He completed the degree in May 2020. His Master's thesis entitled: "Alleviating Carmageddon with a research-driven Rapid Transit approach" included a survey of motorists on the most congested roads in Massachusetts. An article was published discussing it in Commonwealth Magazine entitled: "Avoiding a return to carmageddon" on June 18, 2020.

Ollis worked in 2020 as a transportation planner at Transit Matters in Boston, Massachusetts drafting transportation planning documents.

In October 2020, Ollis moved to Virginia to take up a new position as FAMPO Administrator at the Fredericksburg Area Metropolitan Planning Organization (FAMPO) and directs transportation planning for the George Washington Regional Commission. He works to develop transportation plans and studies to improve the transportation network in the region and reduce the chronic congestion.

As a planner Ollis is passionate about Transit Oriented Development (TOD) and has written a number of opinion articles arguing for TOD developments in the Fredericksburg, Spotsylvania and Stafford region.
