= Darren Bergman =

South African politician

Darren Bergman MP
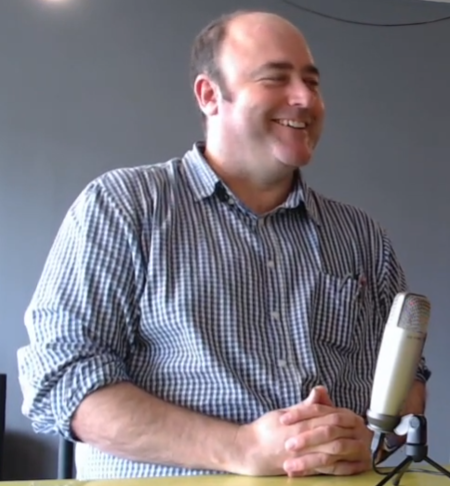
- Bergman in November 2023

Shadow Deputy Minister of Trade, Industry and Competition
- In office 21 April 2023 – 14 June 2024
- Leader: John Steenhuisen
- Preceded by: Mathew Cuthbert
- Succeeded by: Office vacant

Shadow Minister of International Relations and Cooperation
- In office 5 June 2019 – 21 April 2023
- Deputy: Mergan Chetty
- Leader: Mmusi Maimane; John Steenhuisen
- Preceded by: Stevens Mokgalapa
- Succeeded by: Emma Powell

Shadow Deputy Minister of Sport and Recreation
- In office 5 June 2014 – 5 June 2019
- Leader: Mmusi Maimane
- Preceded by: Donald Lee
- Succeeded by: Position abolished

Member of the National Assembly of South Africa
- Incumbent
- Assumed office 21 May 2014

Personal details
- Born: Darren Bergman
- Party: Democratic Alliance (2000–present)
- Other political affiliations: Democratic Party (1999–2000)
- Occupation: Member of Parliament
- Profession: Politician

Darren Bergman is a South African politician who has been a Member of the National Assembly of South Africa for Democratic Alliance since 2014. Within the DA Shadow Cabinet, he was Shadow Deputy Minister of Sport and Recreation between 2014 and 2019, Shadow Minister of International Relations and Cooperation between 2019 and 2023 and Shadow Deputy Minister of Trade, Industry and Competition between 2023 and 2024.

== Background ==
Bergman was educated at King David High School in Linksfield, Johannesburg. He was the managing director of Youth Against Crime, a policeman, basic life paramedic and a consultant before he became active in politics. In 1999, he became the regional youth leader of the Democratic Party in Johannesburg. Bergman was elected to the Johannesburg city council in the 2000 municipal election as a representative of the newly formed Democratic Alliance. He served as a PR and as a ward councillor for the DA until he was elected to parliament in 2014. Bergman also served as the treasurer of the Africa Liberal Network.

== Parliamentary career ==
Bergman stood as a DA parliamentary candidate in the 2014 national elections and was subsequently elected to the National Assembly of South Africa and sworn in on 21 May 2014. On 5 June 2014, he was appointed Shadow Deputy Minister of Sport and Recreation by Mmusi Maimane, deputising for Solly Malatsi. Bergman became a member of the Portfolio Committee on Sport and Recreation on 20 June 2014. On 17 September 2015, he was appointed an alternate member of the Portfolio Committee on International Relations and Cooperation.

Bergman was re-elected to parliament in the national and provincial elections on 8 May 2019. The newly elected DA caucus elected him as a whip. On 5 June 2019, Bergman was promoted to Shadow Minister of International Relations and Cooperation.

Bergman attempted to break up a conflict between EFF MP Marshall Dlamini and fellow DA MP Denis Joseph in September 2019. In October 2019, Maimane resigned as DA leader and John Steenhuisen was elected his interim successor. He temporarily retained Maimane's cabinet.

In October 2020, Bergman criticised president Cyril Ramaphosa, who also served as chair of the African Union, for being silent on many African crises. He said that Ramaphosa's failure for not speaking out against the attacks on the protests against police brutality in Nigeria, could be seen as him "condoning" it.

After Steenhuisen was elected DA leader for a full term, he announced his shadow cabinet in December 2020. Bergman remained as Shadow Minister of International Relations and Cooperation.

In the 2020 Register of Members’ Interests, Bergman declared that he received R10,000 a month for consultancy work in a company he owns with associates.

In January 2021, Bergman demanded that South African diplomats pay almost R10 million in unreturned rental deposits.

Bergman was moved to Shadow Deputy Minister of Trade, Industry and Competition on 21 April 2023.

Bergman was re-elected to the National Assembly at the 2024 general election.
