= Mimmy Gondwe =

South African politician (born 1977)

Mimmy Gondwe MP
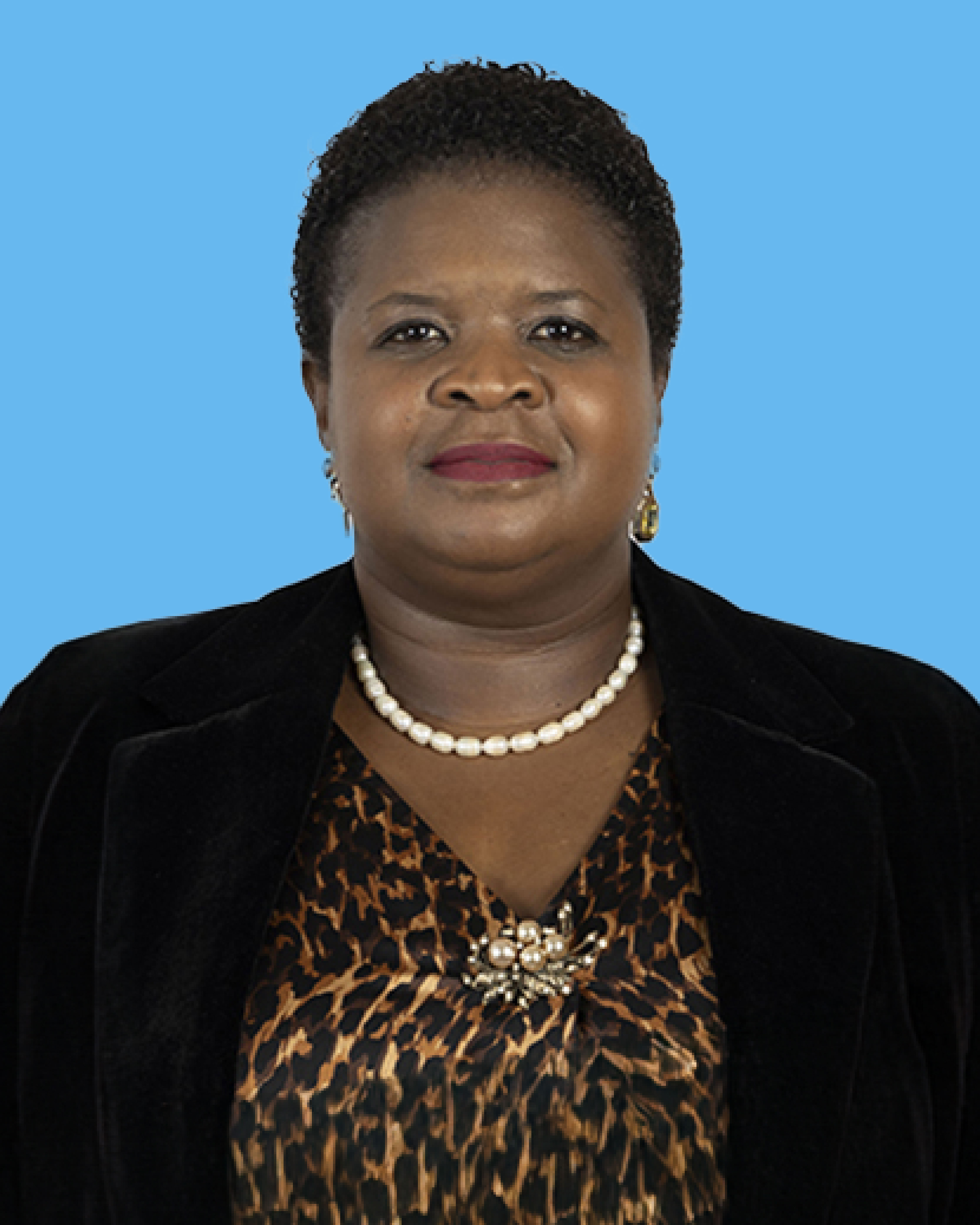

Deputy Minister of Higher Education
- In office 3 July 2024 – 30 June 2026
- President: Cyril Ramaphosa
- Preceded by: Office established
- Succeeded by: Yusuf Cassim

Shadow Minister of Public Enterprises
- In office 2 November 2023 – 14 June 2024
- Leader: John Steenhuisen
- Preceded by: Ghaleb Cachalia
- Succeeded by: Position vacant

Shadow Deputy Minister of Public Service and Administration
- In office 5 December 2020 – 2 November 2023
- Leader: John Steenhuisen
- Preceded by: Michéle Clarke
- Succeeded by: Position vacant

Shadow Deputy Minister of State Security
- In office 5 June 2019 – 5 December 2020
- Leader: John Steenhuisen; Mmusi Maimane
- Preceded by: Herman Groenewald
- Succeeded by: Dirk Stubbe

Member of the National Assembly of South Africa
- Incumbent
- Assumed office 22 May 2019

Personal details
- Born: 7 February 1977 (age 49)
- Party: Democratic Alliance
- Education: University of Cape Town (BA); Rhodes University (LLB); Stellenbosch University (LLD, LLD)

Mimmy Martha Gondwe (born 7 February 1977) is a South African politician who has been a Member of the National Assembly of South Africa since 2019. She served as the Deputy Minister of Higher Education from 2024 until 2026. A member of the Democratic Alliance, Gondwe was Shadow Deputy Minister of State Security from 2019 to 2020, the Shadow Deputy Minister of Public Service and Administration between 2020 and 2023, and the Shadow Minister of Public Enterprises from 2023 until 2024.

== Education ==
Gondwe holds a Bachelor of Arts in Political Philosophy from the University of Cape Town, a Bachelor of Laws from Rhodes University; a Masters of Laws in Mercantile Law as well as a Doctorate of Laws in Mercantile Law from the University of Stellenbosch.

Whilst studying towards her PhD at the University of Stellenbosch, Gondwe was awarded a number of scholarships and grants in recognition of her academic achievements. These scholarships and grants included the Fulbright Scholarship, Andrew Mellon Foundation Scholarship, Baden Württemberg Scholarship and the NRF Thuthuka Research Grant.

Gondwe also completed her articles at Webber Wentzel, Cape Town.

== Career ==
Gondwe worked as a Parliamentary Content Advisor and Researcher for the Select Committee on Petitions and Executive Undertakings, before assuming an active role in politics.

== Political career ==
In March 2019, the Democratic Alliance announced their parliamentary candidate lists for the May general election. Gondwe was number 12 on its national list, a high position for someone who was not a sitting MP. She was easily elected to the National Assembly in the election.

On 5 June 2019, Gondwe was appointed as Shadow Deputy Minister of State Security under Shadow Minister Dianne Kohler-Barnard. Gondwe served on the Joint Constitutional Review Committee, on the Joint Standing Committee on Intelligence and the Ad Hoc Committee to Initiate and Introduce Legislation Amending Section 25 of the Constitution.

Gondwe was promoted to Shadow Deputy Minister of Public Service and Administration on 5 December 2020. On 7 December, she became a Member of the Portfolio Committee on Public Service and Administration, Performance Monitoring & Evaluation.

Gondwe was also a Member of the Section 194 Enquiry Committee which was established on 7 April 2021 to determine if there are grounds for the removal of Adv Busisiwe Mkhwebane as Public Protector.

On 2 November 2023, Gondwe was appointed Shadow Minister of Public Enterprises by John Steenhuisen, succeeding Ghaleb Cachalia, who was sacked from the shadow cabinet for making a comment on the Gaza war.

Gondwe was re-elected to the National Assembly in the 2024 general election. The DA then entered into a coalition government with the African National Congress which saw Gondwe appointed Deputy Minister of Higher Education.

On 17 June 2026, the newly elected DA leader Geordin Hill-Lewis wrote to Ramaphosa requesting that he remove Gondwe as the Deputy Minister of Higher Education. Ramaphosa agreed to Hill-Lewis's request on 30 June, removing her from government.

== Personal life ==
Gondwe has two children. She regularly volunteers for her church.
