= James Lorimer (South African politician) =

South African politician

James Lorimer MP
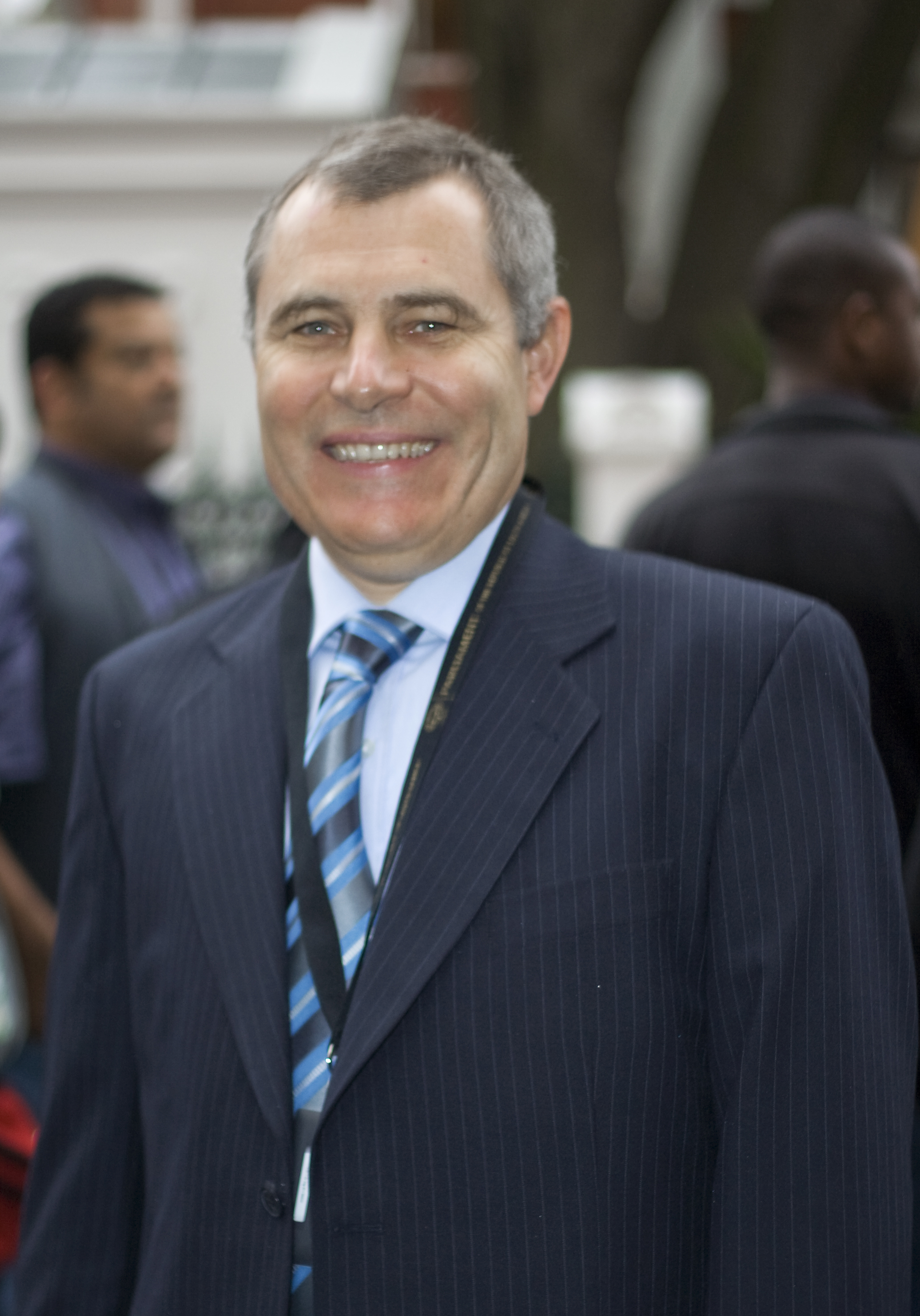

Shadow Minister of Environmental Affairs, Forestry and Fisheries
- Incumbent
- Assumed office 2019
- Leader: John Steenhuisen

Member of Parliament for Linden, Gauteng
- Incumbent
- Assumed office 6 May 2009

Personal details
- Born: 19 February 1962 (age 64)
- Party: Democratic Alliance
- Parent: Rupert Lorimer

James Lorimer (born 19 February 1962) is a South African politician, a Member of Parliament for the Democratic Alliance, and the Shadow Minister of Environmental Affairs, Forestry and Fisheries. Previously he has served as a deputy spokesperson on Parliament's defence and basic education committees, and as Shadow Minister on Co-operative Governance and Traditional Affairs as well as Mineral Affairs. He was first elected to the National Assembly in 2009.

== Education ==
Lorimer was born in Johannesburg in 1962 and educated at St Stithians College and University of Witwatersrand.

In 1981, while still at university, Lorimer began work as a freelance journalist on South Africa's first independent radio station, Capital Radio.

He graduated from the University of the Witwatersrand with a BA degree.

== Early career ==
Lorimer worked for International Broadcasting Services in London in the mid-1980s. On completion of his South African military service, he was appointed Capital Radio's deputy news and sports editor in 1989, advancing to editor within two years.

He also worked freelance for the likes of the US National Public Radio and the Canadian Broadcasting Corporation.

After a contract as morning news anchor on Radio 702 during South Africa's first democratic elections in 1994, Lorimer started Network Radio Services in 1995, serving as its chief executive officer for four years.

From 1999, Lorimer acted as a media consultant and trainer in South Africa and in Indonesia, East Timor, Tanzania, Sudan and Thailand.

== Political career ==
In 2003, Lorimer entered politics as media director to Tony Leon, leader of the Democratic Alliance (DA), official opposition to the ANC. Later he moved to the DA’s national media team, as well as media and research director for the DA caucus in the Gauteng Legislature. He currently serves as the DA Shadow Minister of Mineral Resources.

== Family life and hobbies ==
He is married to Paddi Clay and they have one son.

His interests include angling and oriental studies.
