= Bridget Masango =

South African politician (born 1962)

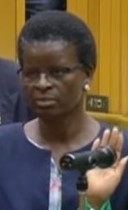
- Masango sworn into Parliament in 2019

Shadow Minister of Social Development
- In office 3 October 2015 – 14 June 2024
- Deputy: Lindy Wilson; Thandi Mpambo-Sibhukwana; Alexandra Abrahams
- Leader: John Steenhuisen; Mmusi Maimane
- Preceded by: Patricia Kopane
- Succeeded by: Position vacant

Member of the National Assembly of South Africa
- Incumbent
- Assumed office 6 October 2015
- Constituency: Gauteng

Permanent delegate to the National Council of Provinces
- In office 22 May 2014 – 5 October 2015
- Constituency: Gauteng

Personal details
- Born: 23 February 1962 (age 64) Kwambonambi, northern Zululand
- Party: Democratic Alliance

Bridget Staff Masango (born 23 February 1962) is a South African Democratic Alliance politician from Gauteng who has been a Member of the National Assembly since October 2015. Within the DA's Shadow Cabinet, she served as Shadow Minister of Social Development from October 2015 until June 2024. From May 2014 to October 2015, Masango served as a permanent delegate to the National Council of Provinces.

== Background ==
Masango was born in Kwambonambi in the north of the former Natal Province (now KwaZulu-Natal). She is the sixth of nine children. She soon moved to the Transvaal Province, where her father found employment as a security guard.

She worked for Group 5, where she met veteran Democratic Alliance politician Michael Moriarty. Masango was a member of the Inkatha Freedom Party and before she became active in the DA, she worked as a communications manager for the Nelson Mandela Children's Foundation.

== National Council of Provinces (2014–2015) ==
Prior to the 2014 general election, she was ranked low on both the DA's national and regional lists. She was not elected to the National Assembly, the lower house, as a consequence. However, the DA selected her to represent the party in the National Council of Provinces, the upper house. On 22 May 2014, Masango was sworn in as Gauteng's permanent delegate to the NCOP.

On 3 October 2015, the DA leader in the National Assembly, Mmusi Maimane, appointed her as Shadow Minister of Social Development. She resigned from the NCOP on 5 October.

=== Committee assignments ===
- Select Committee on Education and Recreation
- Select Committee on Social Services
- Select Committee on Communications and Public Enterprises
- Select Committee on Land and Mineral Resources

== National Assembly ==
On 6 October 2015, Masango entered the National Assembly. She became a member of the Portfolio Committee on Social Development on 15 October. In 2016, Masango questioned who paid for then-Minister of Social Development Bathabile Dlamini's R110,000 stay at The Oyster Box hotel.

On 15 February 2017, she delivered her maiden speech at the annual State of the Nation Address debate. Masango was re-elected at the 2019 general election. In June 2020, Masango called on president Cyril Ramaphosa to remove Lindiwe Zulu as Minister of Social Development.

In December 2020, Masango was re-appointed to her shadow cabinet role by the newly elected DA leader, John Steenhuisen.

Masango was re-elected to the National Assembly in the 2024 general election. Thereafter, she was elected to chair the Portfolio Committee on Social Development.

=== Committee assignment ===
- Portfolio Committee on Social Development

== Personal life ==
Masango was married and has one daughter. Her one brother died in May 2015.
