= Benedicta van Minnen =

South African politician

Benedicta van Minnen MPP

Member of the Western Cape Provincial Parliament
- Incumbent
- Assumed office 13 June 2024

Member of the National Assembly of South Africa
- In office 22 May 2019 – 28 May 2024

Personal details
- Born: 10 December 1970 (age 55)
- Party: Democratic Alliance
- Education: University of Cape Town
- Occupation: Politician

Benedicta Maria van Minnen (born 10 December 1970) is a South African politician and a member of the Democratic Alliance. She has been a member of the Western Cape Provincial Parliament. Previously, she served as a councillor in the City of Cape Town and as a Member of the National Assembly of South Africa.

== Early life and education ==
Van Minnen studied at the University of Cape Town. In 1991, she was elected to the university's Student Representative Council (SRC).

== Political career ==
A member of the Democratic Alliance, she was first elected as the ward councillor for ward 15 in the City of Cape Town in the 2011 municipal election.

Mayoral Committee Member for Health, Lungiswa James, was elected to the National Assembly at the 2014 general election, which caused the position to become vacant. Consequently, mayor Patricia de Lille appointed Van Minnen to the post. De Lille moved her to the housing portfolio in January 2015. Van Minnen was elected as a PR councillor in the August 2016 municipal election. De Lille kept her in the mayoral committee until January 2017.

Prior to the 8 May 2019 general election, Van Minnen was ranked second on the DA's Western Cape list of candidates for the National Assembly. She was nominated to Parliament after the election, and was sworn in on 22 May 2019. On 5 June 2019, DA parliamentary leader Mmusi Maimane appointed her as the party's deputy spokesperson on the Standing Committee on Public Accounts. She became a member of the committee on 27 June 2019.

Van Minnen became an alternate member of the Committee for Section 194 Enquiry on 21 June 2021.

Van Minnen was elected to the Western Cape Provincial Parliament in the 2024 Western Cape provincial election.
