= Andricus van der Westhuizen =

South African politician

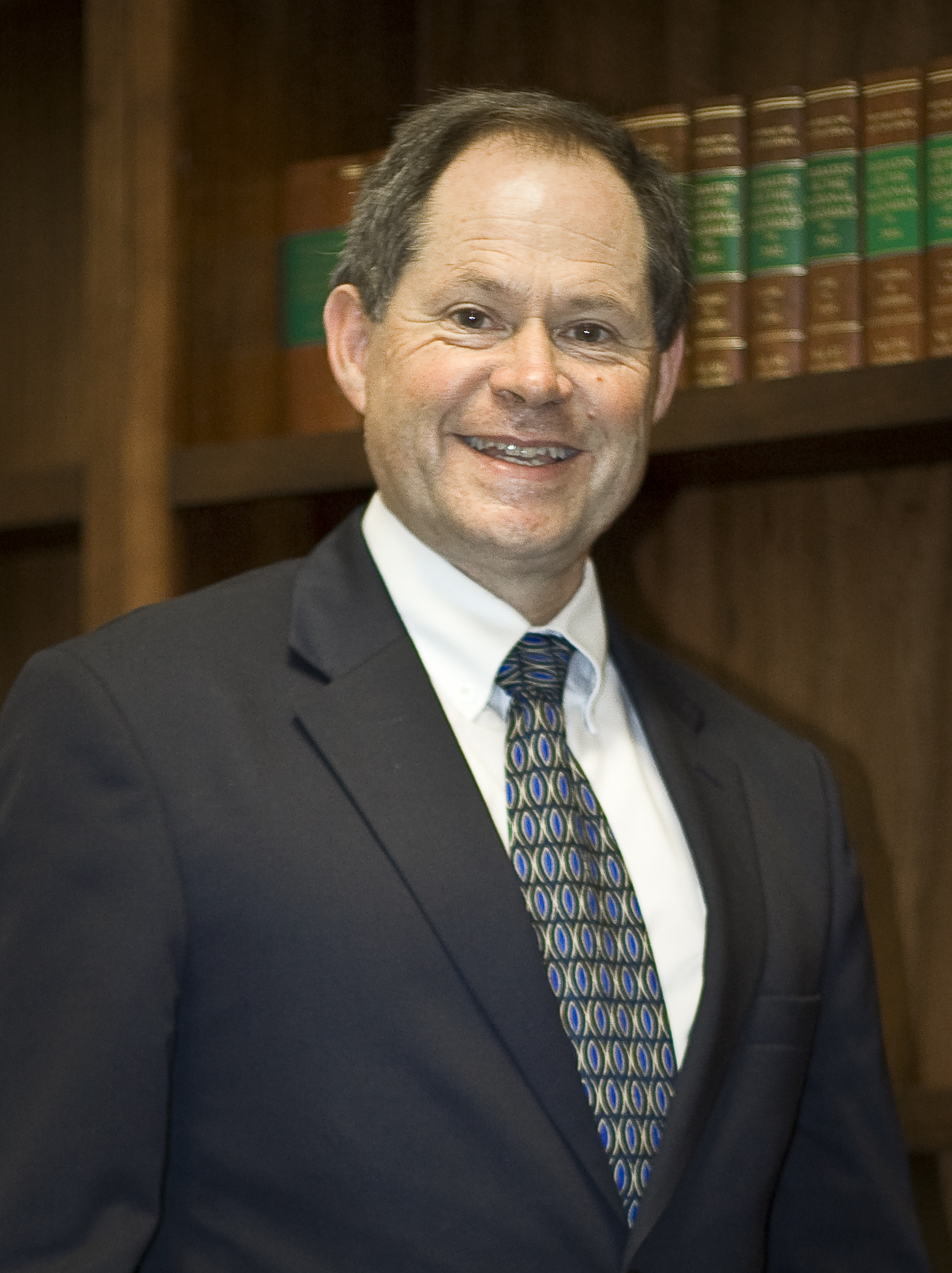
- Van der Westhuizen in 2009

Member of the Western Cape Provincial Parliament
- In office 22 May 2019 – 28 May 2024

Member of the National Assembly of South Africa
- In office 6 May 2009 – 7 May 2019

Personal details
- Born: Andricus Pieter van der Westhuizen
- Party: Democratic Alliance
- Occupation: Member of the Provincial Parliament
- Profession: Politician

Andricus Pieter van der Westhuizen is a South African politician who served as a Member of the Western Cape Provincial Parliament from May 2019 until May 2024. Prior to serving in the provincial parliament, he served in the national parliament as a Member of the National Assembly from May 2009 until May 2019. Van der Westhuizen is a member of the Democratic Alliance.

== Career ==
In 1999, Van der Westhuizen was elected as a councillor of the Franschhoek municipality. He was elected as the inaugural speaker of the Stellenbosch Local Municipality following the 2000 municipal election. He won re-election in the 2006 municipal election.

Van der Westhuizen was elected to the National Assembly in the general election that was held on 22 April 2009. He became an MP on 6 May 2009. DA Parliamentary Leader Athol Trollip named him Shadow Deputy Minister of Trade and Industry. He was moved to the Higher Education and Training portfolio of the shadow cabinet in September 2010.

In February 2012, newly elected parliamentary leader Lindiwe Mazibuko named him Shadow Deputy Minister of Labour. Mazibuko later appointed him as Shadow Deputy Minister for Economic Development in November 2013. After the 2014 general election, Mmusi Maimane was elected the DA's parliamentary leader. He appointed Van der Westhuizen as Shadow Deputy Minister of Public Service and Administration.

Following the 2019 general election, Van der Westhuizen was sworn in as a Member of the Western Cape Provincial Parliament. He was elected chairperson of the Standing Committee on Agriculture, Environmental Affairs and Development Planning in June 2019.

In March 2024, News24 reported that Van der Westhuizen was one of a number of DA MPPs who would be retiring at the general election in May.
