= Chris Hunsinger =

South African politician

The Honorable Chris Hunsinger MP
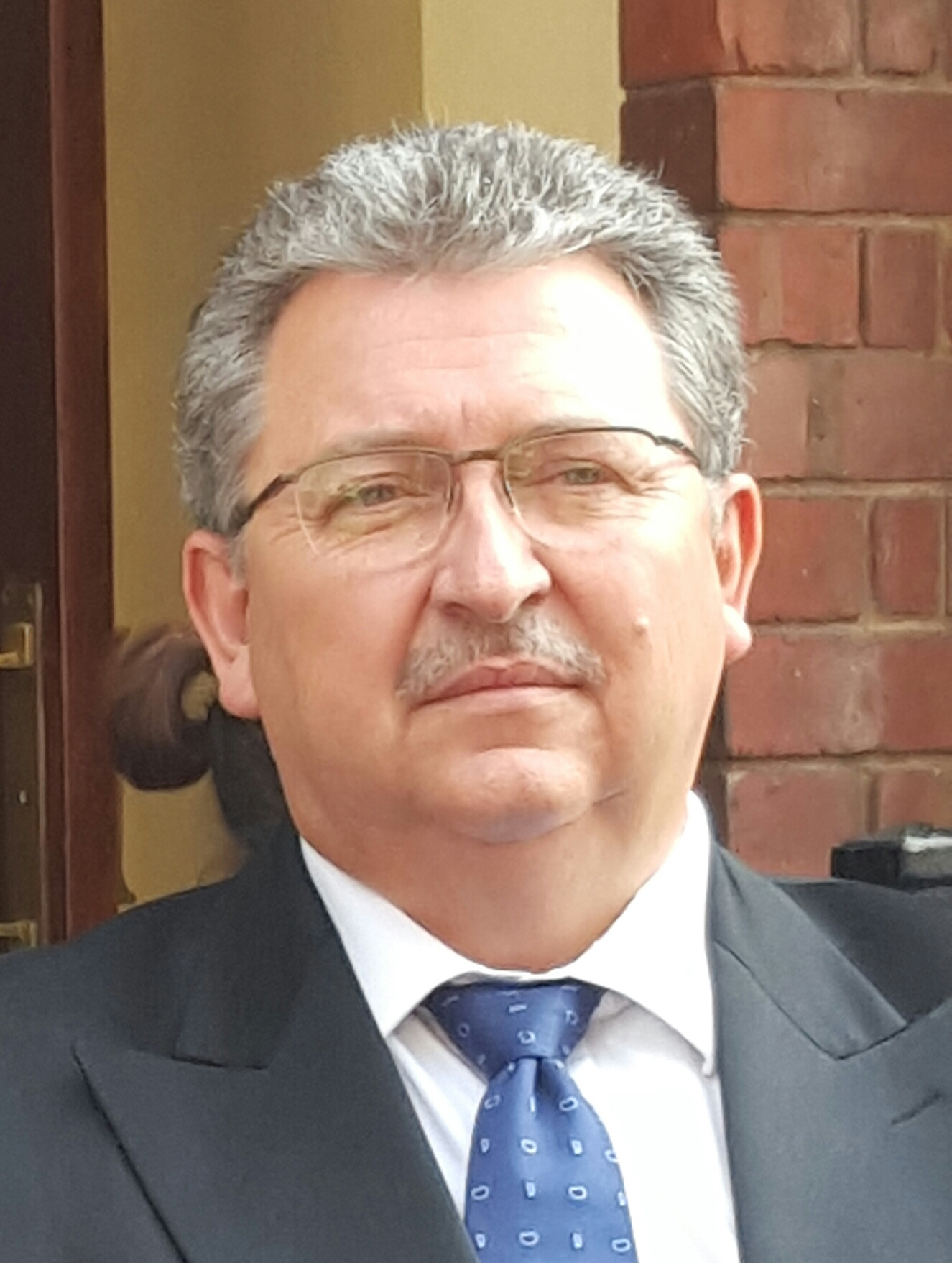

Shadow Minister of Transport in the National Assembly of South Africa
- Incumbent
- Assumed office 6 June 2019
- Preceded by: Manuel De Freitas

Deputy Shadow Minister of Transport
- In office May 2014 – May 2019

Personal details
- Born: 23 October 1962 (age 63) Bloemfontein, South Africa
- Party: Democratic Alliance
- Children: =
- Education: University of Stellenbosch
- Occupation: Politician

Chris Hunsinger (born 23 October 1962) is a South African politician. a Member of the South African Parliament since 2014, Caucus Whip and Treasurer with the Democratic Alliance (South Africa) . He was appointed by the then Leader of the Opposition Mmusi Maimane on 5 June 2019 and retained by the current Leader of the Opposition John Steenhuisen in October 2019 and again in December 2020, as The Shadow Minister of Transport. Hunsinger was re-elected to Parliament on 29 May 2024 as Spokesperson for Transport and as a member in the National Portfolio Committee of Transport. He speaks and writes about issues related to consumer and commodity needs in transport, including safety, planning, finance and management with South African roads, rail, maritime, and aviation service providers. Following his re-election to parliament in 2024, he was appointed a member of the Joint Standing Committee on Financial Management of Parliament. During the parliamentary plenary session on 25 July 2024, Hunsinger was elected to the Board of Trustees as Parliamentary Representative of the Political Office Bearers Pension Fund and subsequently as Chairperson of the Investments sub-committee.

== Major achievement ==
Hunsinger earned recognition for his key role in the dramatic consolidation of all opposition parties in the last sessions of Parliament in Dec 2018 during consideration of the 'RABS Bill'. Referred to as "a stunning turnaround" (Times Live) this speech in the National Assembly of Parliament in RSA highlighted the deficiencies of the Road Accident Benefit Scheme Bill, 2017 & presented a strong case of irrational design & manipulated process in the 2nd Reading Debate on 4 December 2018, whereas RABS intended to replace the Road Accident Fund Act 56 of 1996. With all other opposition parties following the paragon, the approval did not succeed on the day & was finally defeated a second time on 6 December 2018 & a further attempt (5 December 2018) was successfully stemmed via crafty application of NA Rules. Despite amendments to the Bill tabled by Hunsinger being 'negatived' at the sitting, All opposition parties walked out, rendering the House inquorate & unable to vote on its second reading, & the bill lapsed as a result. In the early stages of being reintroduced during the 6th Parliament, "Hunsinger convinced the Committee." not to proceed with the RABS Bill, which Parliament ratified on 3 September 2020.

Following his success during the 2016 elections in Matzikama by winning 90% of the wards and 75% of the voting districts for the Democratic Alliance, he was assigned to the Bergrivier Constituency in February 2017. In 2019, the municipality was placed 8th in South Africa, 3rd in Western Cape Province, and 2nd in the West Region in the Good Governance Africa Performance Index conducted amongst 213 municipalities, using data on 15 indicators across three themes: administration, economic development & service delivery. Eight consecutive clean audits during his tenure preceded the general government elections in 2024, in which Hunsinger led Bergrivier to win 100% of the wards and 100% of the voting districts for the Democratic Alliance for the first time.

== Life ==
Member of the National Assembly Portfolio Committee on Transport covering:

- 'Road: (including Road Accident Fund, Road Traffic Management Corporation, Cross-Border Road Transport Agency, Road Traffic Infringements Agency)
- 'Rail: (including Railway Safety Regulator, Passenger Rail Agency of South Africa)
- 'Maritime: (including South African Maritime Safety Authority, Ports Regulator of South Africa)
- 'Aviation: (including South African Civil Aviation Authority, Airports Company South Africa, Air Traffic Navigation Services,)

Hunsinger was an entrepreneur in the retail and financial services industry. He was nominated as SA Best Practice Top 10 Finalist in 2009 and won the Celestis Best Practice Award of the Western Cape Province in the same year

As a public figure, Hunsinger takes time to share his activities with 7 000 Facebook & Twitter followers while maintaining an average attendance rate of over 90% in official parliamentary engagements & sessions.

He holds a master's degree in Public Administration (MPA) and a Doctor's degree in Business Administration with MANCOSA and is a certificated HTML coder.

== Politics ==
Before being promoted to Parliament, Hunsinger was a councillor in the Swartland Local Municipality. He was MMC responsible for Finance & Economic Development when the council received three consecutive "clean" audit outcomes. In 2011/12, 2012/13, and 2013/14, one of only two municipalities out of 256 in SA accomplished this standard and improved its standing. At the same time also improved on the independent Local Economic Development Maturity Assessment from 14th position in 2011 to 1st in 2014 out of 30 municipalities in the Western Cape.

He led the Swartland bid team in 2013 that won international finance for the first VPUU and RSEP (Violence Prevention through Urban Upliftment and Regional Socio-Economic) projects in South Africa for rural areas. The unique proposal was recognized as a leading bid in terms of concept, innovative content, and standard of submission. He also served as Provincial Executive Council member for the Western Cape in South African Local Government Association and as provincial chairman of three working groups on the provincial and national level: Municipal Infrastructure & Planning, Municipal Trade & Services, and Climate Change & Environmental Planning. As Political Leader in the Democratic Alliance, Hunsinger has served as a Federal, Provincial, and Regional Council member. As West Region Campaign Manager in the 2024 national elections, involving 10 municipal constituencies, the Democratic Alliance improved with 39% support compared to the previous national polls in 2021, and in Bergrivier Constituency, the 61% DA support of the 2021 local government elections was increased to 66%, retaining the reputation as a top-performing constituency in South Africa in local, provincial, and national election outcomes. In the 2016 Local Government Elections, he was responsible for target tracking in the West Region, which saw an increase of 19% over the 2011 election results. As a ward councillor in Swartland Local Municipality, Hunsinger improved support for the Democratic Alliance in Ward 10 from 68% in 2006 to 93% in 2014 with 73% voter participation. As Constituency head, he served in Matzikama from 2014 to 2016 and Bergrivier since 2017.

== Civic contribution ==
In 2006, Hunsinger was honoured with the International Blue Heart Award in Berlin, Germany, for his contribution towards promoting various international youth partnerships between South Africa and Germany since 1997—and in particular for the establishment of the annual International Sondeza Youth Camp in Ganzekraal, South Africa, in 2004. He was the 14th international and first African recipient of this prestigious prize and remains personally involved in volunteer projects and programs, which kicked off in 2005. Teenagers from the mainly rural Western Region of Western Cape have participated annually among 20 invited countries in leadership development programs at the Eurocamp in Kiez-Harz, Güntersberge, Germany, Belgium, and South Africa since 1999, benefiting more than a thousand teenagers. In 2016, Hunsinger received an honorary life membership of USAPHO. a registered non-profit community organization, served as Executive Board member of The Character Company, and Governance Director of SASH—The SA Society of Hope.

== Offices held ==
Political offices
Preceded by Gregory Krumbock	South African Shadow Deputy Minister of Transport; 2014–2019	Succeeded by Thami Mabhena
Preceded by Manuel de Freitas	South African Shadow Minister of Transport; 2019–Current	Succeeded by incumbent
