= Nomsa Marchesi =

South African politician

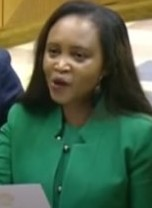
2019 sworn in

Nomsa Innocencia Tarabella Marchesi (born 2 July 1970) is a South African politician who, as of August 2023 is Rise Mzansi's Free State Convenor. From 2014 until August 2023, she served as a member of the National Assembly of South Africa as a member of the Democratic Alliance.

== Early life and education ==
Marchesi was born in Bloemfontein, Free State on 2 July 1970. She attended Vulamasango High in Mangaung and later moved to Wedela High, near Potchefstroom. She studied at University of the Free State, earning a BSc in microbiology and biochemistry. She later studied in Ireland and worked there in clinical research. Marchesi returned to South Africa to obtain an honors degree in Pharmacology and work as a researcher also at the University of the Free State.

== Politics ==
Marchesi joined the Democratic Alliance in 2013. In 2014, she was elected as a member of Parliament of South Africa. She served as a Whip in the Shadow Cabinet of Mmusi Maimane. She was also a member of the Portfolio Committee on Basic Education in South Africa's parliament. On 21 April 2023, Marchesi became Shadow Deputy Minister of Women, Youth and Persons with Disabilities, and an Additional Member on Police with a focus on gender-based violence.

On 15 August 2023, after 10 years as a representative for the DA, Marchesi resigned, giving up her position as a member of parliament. She joined many black former members of the DA who resigned from the party citing its lack of inclusivity for black members. Leaving the DA, she opted to join political party Rise Mzansi, becoming the party's Free State convenor. Marchesi said that Rise Mzansi's value's more closely aligned with her own and that unlike the DA, it was, in her words, "not a one man show".
