= Nazley Sharif =

South African politician (born 1990)

Nazley Sharif MP
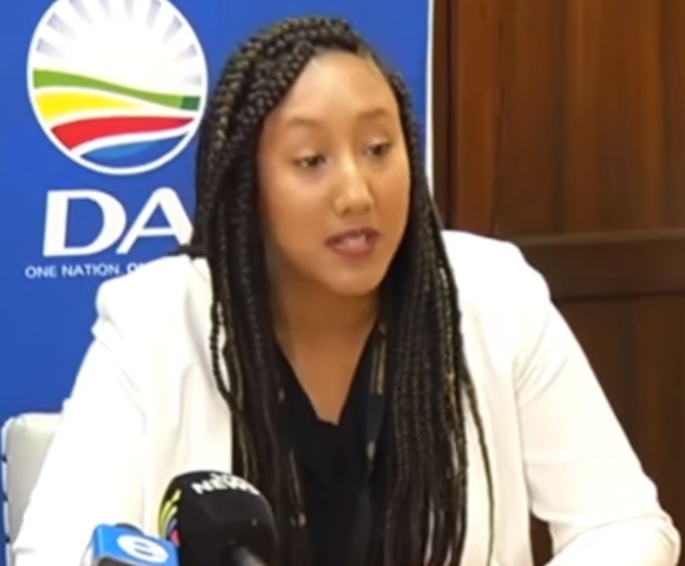
- Sharif in September 2019

Member of the National Assembly of South Africa
- Incumbent
- Assumed office 24 July 2025
- In office 22 May 2019 – 28 May 2024

Member of the Gauteng Provincial Legislature
- In office 14 June 2024 – 23 July 2025

Personal details
- Born: Nazley Khan Sharif; 18 May 1990 (age 36)
- Party: Democratic Alliance
- Education: University of the Witwatersrand
- Occupation: Politician; political commentator; activist

Nazley Khan Sharif (born 18 May 1990) is a South African politician who has served in the National Assembly of South Africa since July 2025 and previously from May 2019 to May 2024. She was a Member of the Gauteng Provincial Legislature from June 2024 to July 2025. During her first term in parliament, she served in the DA's Shadow Cabinet as the Shadow Minister of Women, Youth and Persons with Disabilities from April 2023 until May 2024, having previously served as Deputy Minister between June 2019 and April 2023. Khan is a member of the Democratic Alliance.

== Education ==
Sharif studied at the University of the Witwatersrand, where she graduated with a BA degree and a BA Honours degree in political sciences.

== Political career ==
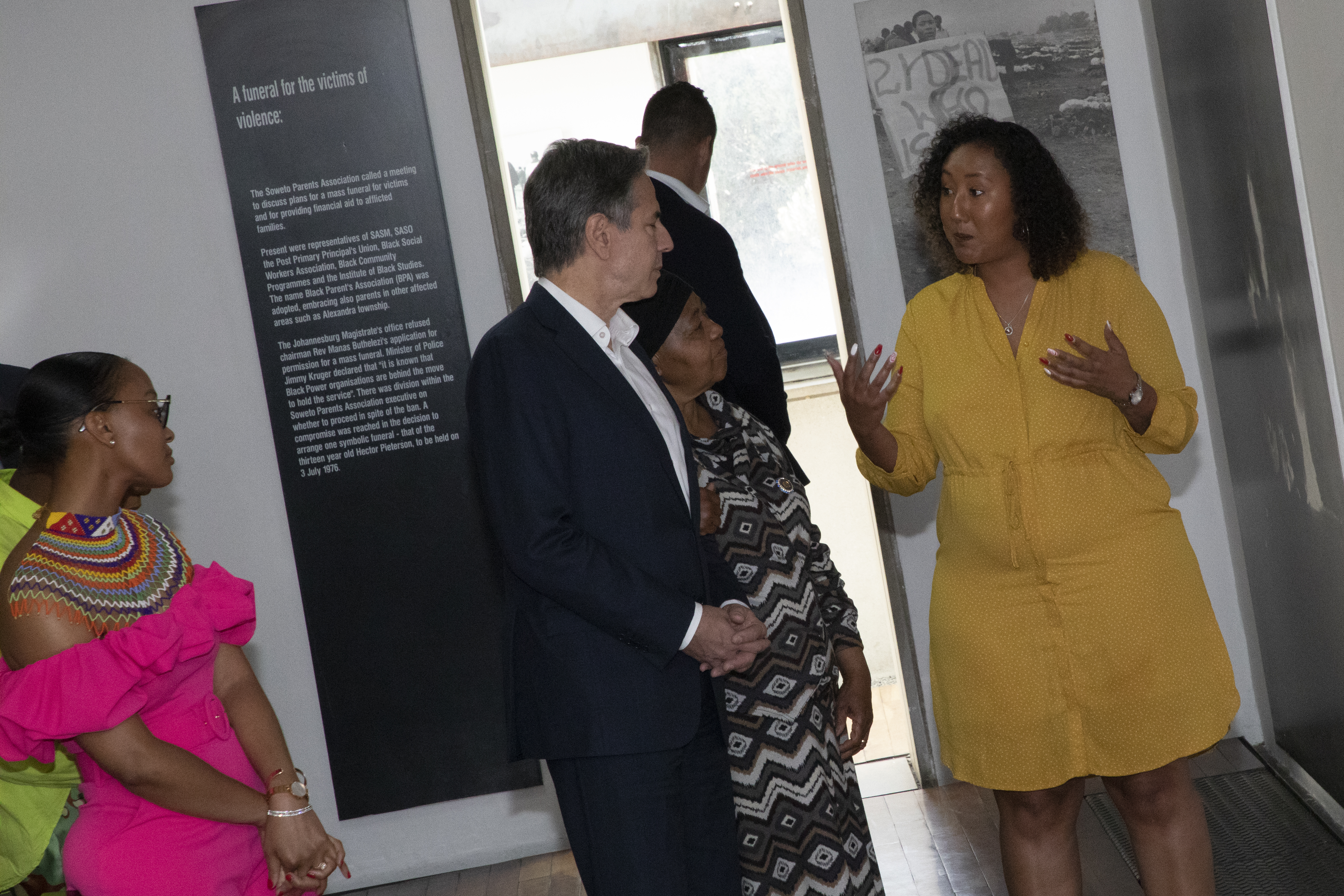
Sharif speaking to U.S. Secretary of State Antony Blinken at the Hector Pieterson Museum in Soweto, Gauteng in August 2022

While in her first year at the University of the Witwatersrand, she joined the Democratic Alliance Students' Organisation (DASO) on campus. She has been the deputy chairperson for Recruitment and Campaigns of DASO, the chair of the DA Youth in the party's Johannesburg South constituency, the chair of the DA Gauteng South Regional Youth Organisation, and the chairperson of the DASO branch at Wits University.

She was elected as a DA councillor in the City of Johannesburg Metropolitan Municipality in 2014. Khan was elected to a full term in 2016. She was then elected chairperson of the municipality's Section 79 Gender, Youth, and People with Disabilities committee.

Khan was elected to the National Assembly in the May 2019 general election. On 5 June 2019, she was appointed Shadow Deputy Minister of Women, Youth and Disabilities in the Presidency. She became a member of the Portfolio Committee on Women, Youth and People with Disabilities on 27 June 2019.

On 5 December 2020, it was announced that Khan would remain as Shadow Deputy Minister of Women, Youth and Disabilities in the Presidency in the shadow cabinet led by John Steenhuisen.

Sharif was promoted to Shadow Minister of Women, Youth and Disabilities in the Presidency by Steenhuisen on 21 April 2023.

Sharif was elected to the Gauteng Provincial Legislature in the 2024 provincial election. She returned to the National Assembly on 24 July 2025.
