= Veronica van Dyk =

South African politician

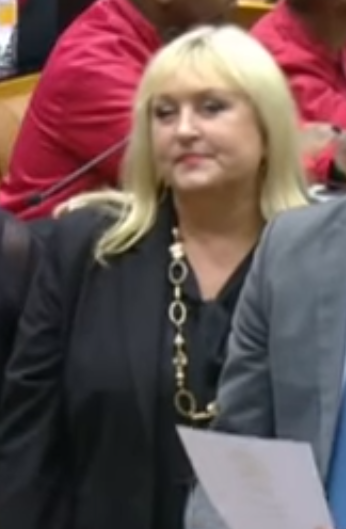
- Van Dyk at her swearing-in in May 2019

Member of the National Assembly of South Africa
- In office 21 May 2014 – 28 May 2024

Personal details
- Born: Veronica Van Dyk; 1 January 1968 (age 58)
- Party: Democratic Alliance
- Profession: Politician

Veronica van Dyk (born 1 January 1968) is a South African politician who served as a member of the National Assembly from May 2014 until May 2024. A member of the Democratic Alliance, she was the party's deputy shadow minister of sports, arts and culture. Van Dyk served as a ward councillor of the Nama Khoi Local Municipality from 2011 to 2014.

== Career ==
Van Dyk founded a monthly newspaper called Namakwa Kletz and presented a local radio show in the Namaqualand. She also headed Daisy Ubuntu Charity, a non-profit organisation.

Van Dyk joined the Democratic Alliance in 2009. She was elected as a ward councillor of the Nama Khoi Local Municipality in the 2011 municipal elections.

== Parliamentary career ==
Van Dyk was nominated to the National Assembly after the general election on 7 May 2014. She took office as an MP on 21 May 2014. During her first term, she served as a member of the Portfolio Committee on Communications. She was the party's shadow deputy minister of communications.

In May 2019 she was re-elected for a second term. She now serves on the Portfolio Committee on Sports, Arts and Culture. She is also the party's shadow deputy minister for that specific portfolio.

Van Dyk did not stand for re-election to Parliament at the 2024 general election.
