= Dirk Stubbe =

South African politician

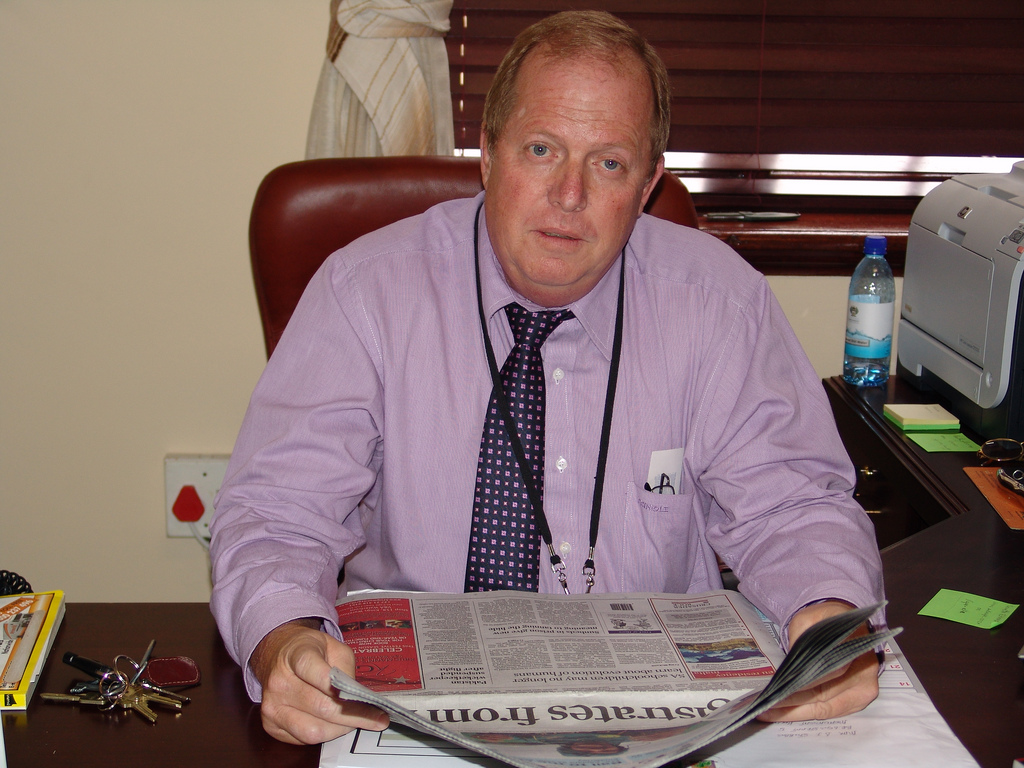
- Stubbe in his office in November 2010

Member of the National Assembly of South Africa
- In office 10 September 2020 – 28 May 2024
- In office 10 September 2010 – 7 May 2019

Member of the Northern Cape Provincial Legislature
- In office 6 May 2009 – September 2010

Personal details
- Born: Dirk Jan Stubbe
- Party: Democratic Alliance
- Occupation: Member of Parliament
- Profession: Politician

Dirk Jan Stubbe is a South African politician who served as a Member of the National Assembly for the Democratic Alliance from September 2010 to May 2019 and again from September 2020 until May 2024. Prior to his tenure in the National Assembly, Stubbe was a Member of the Northern Cape Provincial Legislature.

== Career ==
=== Northern Cape Provincial Legislature ===
In May 2009, Stubbe was elected to the Northern Cape Provincial Legislature as a member of the Democratic Alliance. He was the party's caucus leader in the legislature. He resigned from the legislature in September 2010.

=== National Assembly ===
On 10 September 2010, Stubbe was sworn in as a Member of the National Assembly, replacing Andrew Louw, who had been redeployed to the provincial legislature. DA parliamentary leader Athol Trollip appointed him as Shadow Minister for State Security. In February 2012, newly elected DA parliamentary leader Lindiwe Mazibuko named him Shadow Deputy Minister of Police. Stubbe was elected to a full term as a Member of Parliament in May 2014. In June 2014, he returned to the position of Shadow Minister of State Security.

As Stubbe was placed low on the DA's national list for the 2019 general election, he did not return to Parliament after the election. Mmusi Maimane resigned from Parliament in October 2019 and the DA nominated him as his successor. He was sworn in on 10 September 2020.

On 5 December 2020, Stubbe was appointed as Shadow Deputy Minister of State Security by John Steenhuisen. He was elected as the DA's provincial finance chairperson on that same day. Stubbe left parliament at the 2024 general election.
