= Manuel de Freitas =

South African politician

Manny de Freitas
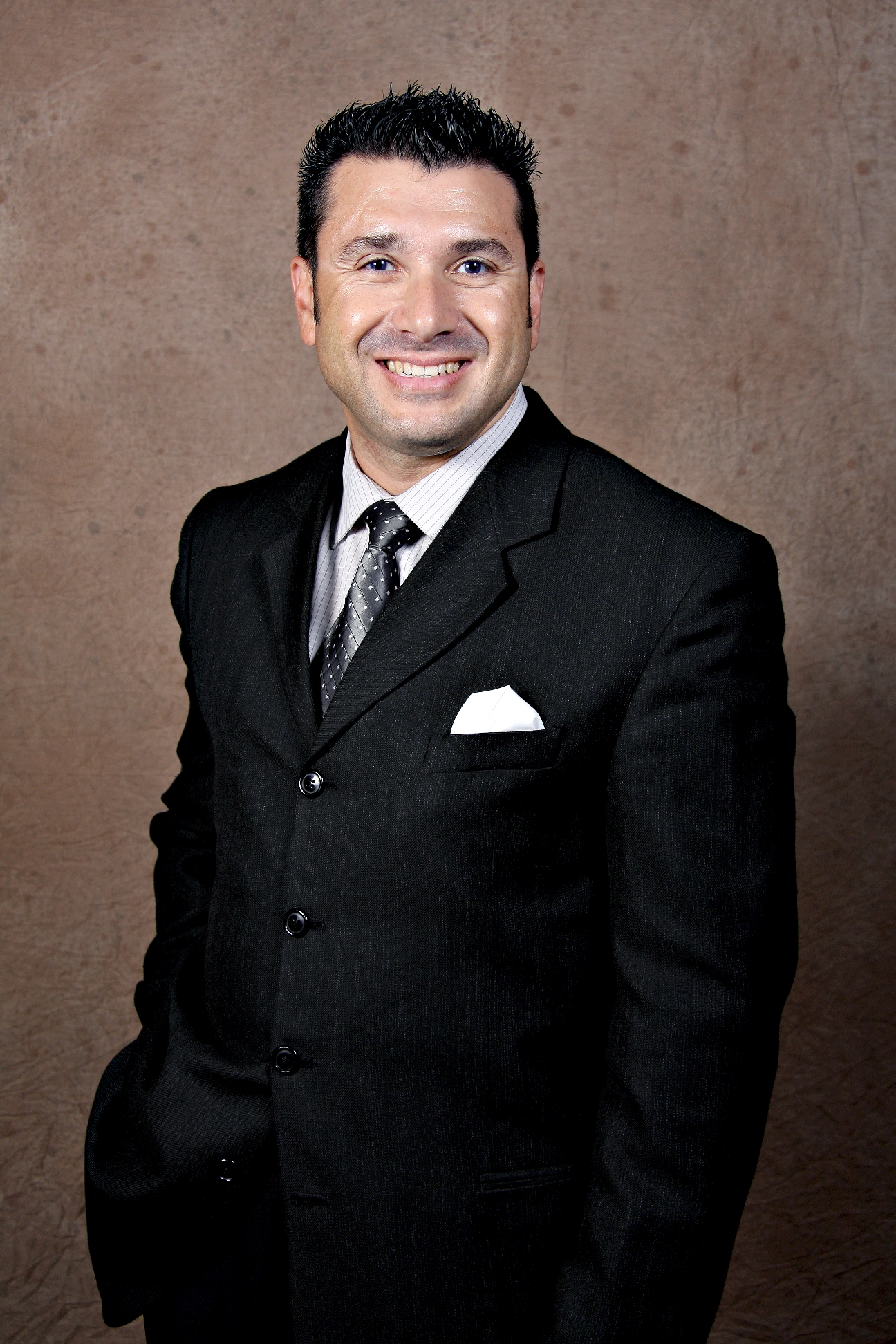
- de Freitas in 2009

Member of the National Assembly of South Africa
- In office 21 May 2009 – 21 May 2024

Personal details
- Born: Lüderitz, Namibia
- Party: Democratic Alliance

Manny Simão Franca de Freitas is a South African politician, and former Member of Parliament with the Democratic Alliance, was appointed as the Shadow Deputy Minister of Transport from 2009 to 2012, Shadow Minister of Home Affairs from 2012 to 2014 and Shadow Minister of Transport in 2014, a position he held until the end of term in 2019.

After the 2019 Elections, de Freitas was appointed as Shadow Minister of Tourism, a position which he held until 2024.

In 2020, de Freitas testified at the Zondo Commission where he described his experience in the Transport Portfolio Committee and his vast and varied work he had undertaken with PRASA (Passenger Rail Agency of South Africa).

He was born in Lüderitz in South West Africa (now Namibia). He has been a resident of Johannesburg since the age of 7.

He joined the Democratic Party (DP), the predecessor to the Democratic Alliance in 1993. He was much involved in the DP Youth Branch and served as its Federal Chairman for 4 years.

Amongst numerous organisations, de Freitas was on the executive committee of the Lusito School for the Mentally and Physically Disabled and also served on its council for many years. He has also been involved with the United Cerebral Palsy Association. He served on various boards such as the Portuguese Community Radio and the board of editors of the international LIBEL magazine and Youth Encounter Spirit-Southern Africa. He sat on the board of the Luso-South African Business Council, of which he was also a founder-member. He was a member of the Madeiran Community Council, was the Gauteng Provincial Chairman of the CANSA Association and also served on its Board of Governors. In October 2008 he was invited to serve on the World Council for Portuguese Communities.

He has hosted various radio shows both in English and in Portuguese (which he speaks fluently) on various radio stations and hosted 2 shows on Radio Veritas, the only Catholic radio station in South Africa, for five years.

In 1995 Manny de Freitas was elected in the first democratic local government elections as one of the country's youngest councillors. He was elected to the Eastern Metropolitan Local Council of the Johannesburg Metropolitan Transitional Council where he served on numerous committees and became Chief Whip of the caucus in 1996.

De Freitas was a Member of the Gauteng Provincial Legislature from 1999 to 2009 when he was elected as Member of Parliament.
