= Erik Marais =

South African politician

The Honourable Erik Marais MP
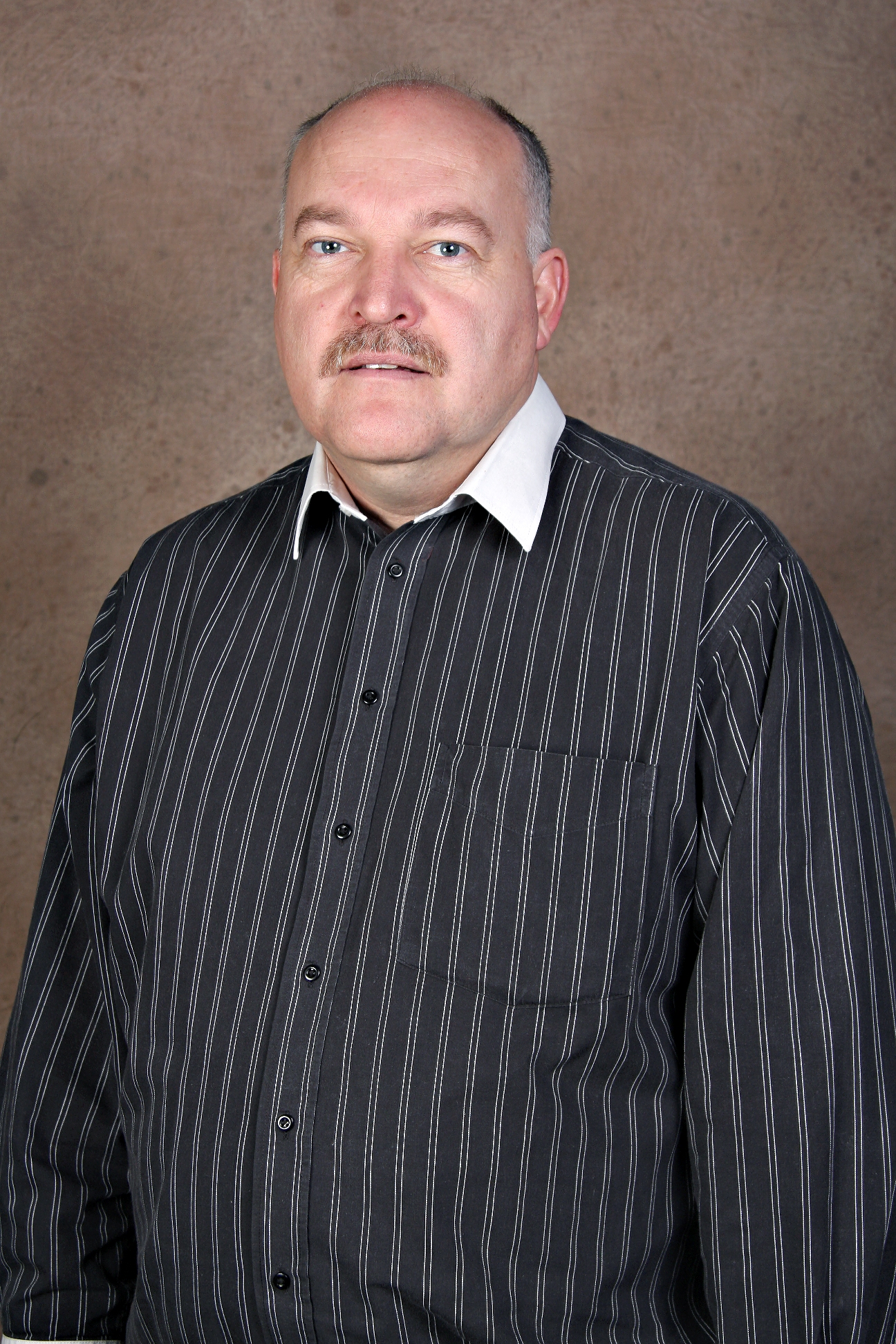

Shadow Deputy Minister of Public Enterprises
- Incumbent
- Assumed office 1 February 2012
- Leader: Mmusi Maimane; John Steenhuisen

Member of Parliament for Western Cape
- Incumbent
- Assumed office 6 May 2009

Personal details
- Party: Democratic Alliance

Erik Johannes Marais is a South African politician, currently a Member of Parliament for the Democratic Alliance, and the Shadow Deputy Minister of Public Enterprises.

== Offices held ==
Political offices
Preceded by ??	South African Shadow Deputy Minister of Mining; 2009–present	Incumbent
