= Kobus Marais =

South African politician (born 1959)

Kobus Marais MP
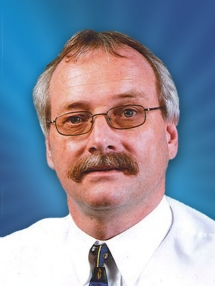

Member of Parliament
- In office 6 May 2009 – 28 May 2024

Personal details
- Born: Sarel Jacobus Francois Marais; 26 June 1959 (age 67) Robertson, Western Cape
- Party: Democratic Alliance

Sarel Jacobus Francois "Kobus" Marais (born 26 June 1959) is a South African politician who served as a Member of Parliament with the Democratic Alliance from 2006 until 2024.

== Education and family life ==
Marais was born on 26 June 1959 as Sarel Jacobus Francois Marais in Robertson, Western Cape, and he lives in Worcester with his wife and daughter (and son years ago). He obtained a bachelor's degree in economics and a Master of Business and Administration degree from Stellenbosch University. He also studied at the Cape Wine Academy and completed a Master Mentorship Course with the Department of Agriculture.

== Early career ==
He started his career in corporate banking and went on to work as international marketing manager in the wine industry in 1989 in various capacities including a partnership in a wine exports business. He then formed his own consultancy, BEFCOM, which specialised in business and marketing strategy, international trade and Black Economic Empowerment (charters, codes of good practice, agri-agreements, BEE charters, industry scorecards, etc.).

In 2006, Marais worked for the VinPro BEE Advisory Service, representing about 5,000 wine producers in promoting Black Economic Development at farm level.

== Political career ==
He has been involved in politics in the Western Cape for many years, first serving as councillor and mayor in Rawsonville from 1995 to 2000 and then again as a Democratic Alliance councillor from 2000 to 2006, where he was nominated as the DA's mayoral candidate for the 2006 election. He has also held several other positions in the Western Cape provincial structures, including Breede Valley Local Management Committee Chairperson, Breede Valley Constituency Chairperson, West Region Treasurer, Member of the Western Cape Provincial Executive Committee and Western Cape Provincial Treasurer.

Marais was elected to Parliament in 2006 where he served as the DA's spokesperson on Finance until 2009. He was also the DA spokesperson on disability until 2009 and is very involved in the community, particularly with disability-related organisations. Upon his re-election to Parliament in 2009, Kobus was appointed as the Shadow Minister of Trade and Industry. In September 2010 he was reassigned to be the Shadow Minister of Economic Development and the Deputy Shadow Minister of Finance. He later served as the DA's Shadow Minister of Defence and Military Veterans from 2015 to 2024.

He was the President of Disability Sport South Africa (DISSA) and serves on the Governing Board of the South African Sport Confederation and Olympic Committee (SASCOC) and the [National Paralympic Committee of South Africa(NPCSA)], served as Vice-President of African Paralympic Committee (APC), and also served on the NEC of South African Sport Association for the Physically Disabled (SASAPD) as Vice-President, as well as holding numerous other positions on the boards of disabled sport organisations.

Marais did put himself forward for re-election at the 2024 elections but has decided not to take up his position and rather explore various opportunities in the South African Defence Industry.
