= List of National Assembly members of the 26th Parliament of South Africa =

2014 to 2019 parliamentarians

5th National Assembly
←	4th	6th	→
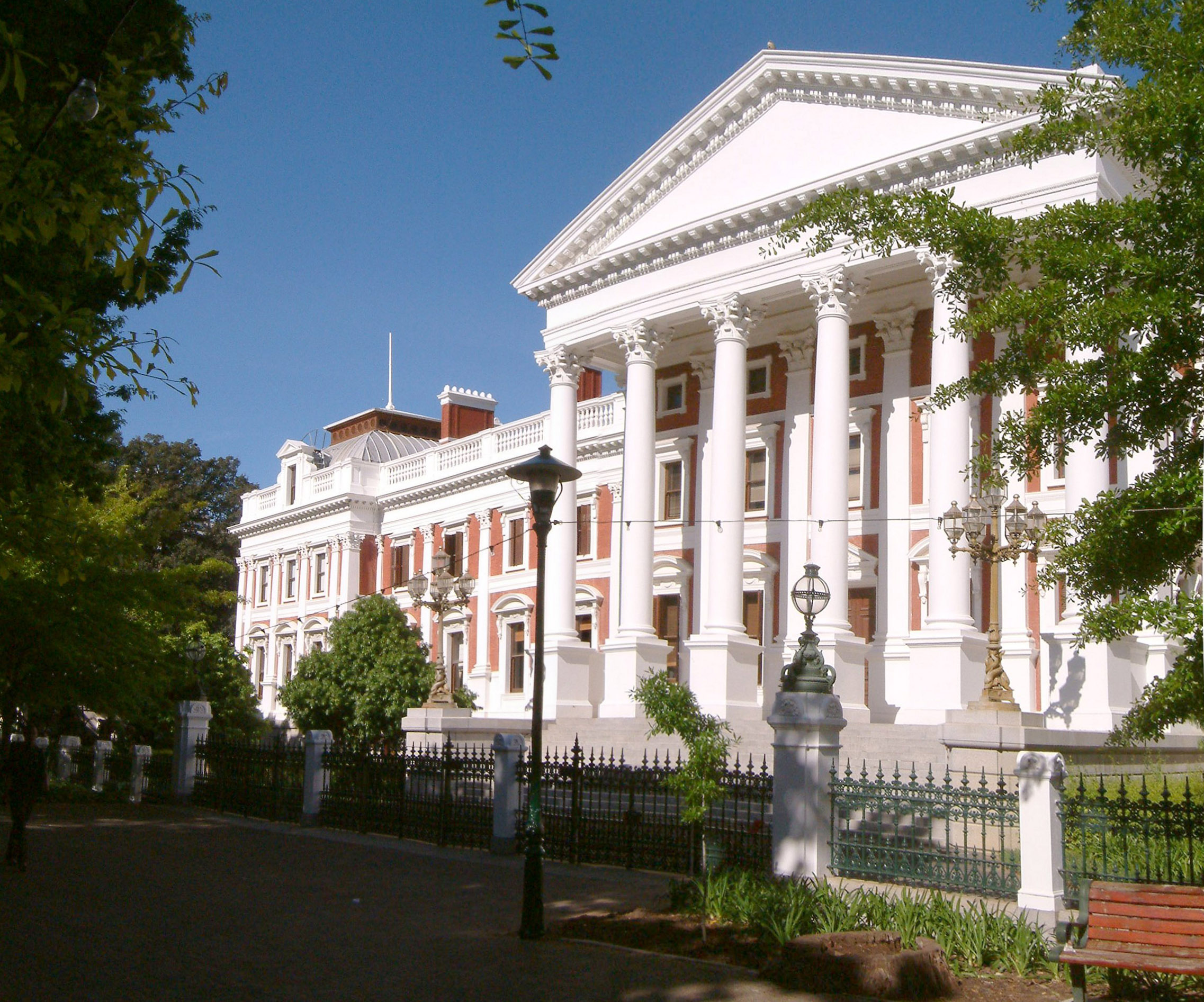
- Houses of Parliament, Cape Town

Overview
- Legislative body: National Assembly of South Africa
- Jurisdiction: South Africa
- Meeting place: Houses of Parliament
- Term: 21 May 2014 – 7 May 2019
- Election: 7 May 2014
- Members: 400
- Speaker: Baleka Mbete
- Deputy Speaker: Lech Tsenoli
- President: Jacob Zuma (until 14 February 2018); Cyril Ramaphosa (from 15 February 2018)
- Leader of the Opposition: Mmusi Maimane
- Cabinet: Zuma II; Ramaphosa I
- Party control: African National Congress

The 26th Parliament of South Africa sat between 2014 and 2019. Members of the National Assembly were elected during the elections of 7 May 2014. In the elections, the African National Congress (ANC) retained a diminished majority, winning 249 seats in the 400-seat legislature. The Democratic Alliance, with 89 seats, remained the largest opposition party. A new entrant, the Economic Freedom Fighters, became the third-largest party in the National Assembly, winning 25 seats. Also represented were nine smaller parties: the African Christian Democratic Party, the African Independent Congress, Agang South Africa, the Congress of the People, the Inkatha Freedom Party, the Freedom Front Plus, the National Freedom Party, the Pan Africanist Congress, and the United Democratic Movement.

Members were sworn in to their seats on 21 May 2014. At its opening session, the National Assembly elected the ANC's Baleka Mbete to succeed Max Sisulu as Speaker of the National Assembly; she comfortably defeated the opposition candidate, receiving 260 votes to the 88 cast for Nosimo Balindlela of the DA. Lech Tsenoli was elected unopposed as Mbete's deputy. Later in the same session, Jacob Zuma was elected unopposed to his second term as President of South Africa. However, Zuma did not complete his term: on 14 February 2018, Mbete announced that the ANC had decided to support a motion of no confidence in Zuma, and he resigned shortly before midnight that night. The following day, the National Assembly elected Zuma's former Deputy President, Cyril Ramaphosa, to his succeed him.

== Committees ==
With its comfortable majority, the ANC was able unilaterally to elect its preferred chairpersons for each of the portfolio committees of the National Assembly. The party announced its nominees for the committees on 12 June. However, there were several subsequent reshuffles of the parliamentary caucus, including major reshuffles in October 2017 and May 2018.

== Members ==
A visual representation of the allocation of seats in the National Assembly during the 26th Parliament

The following lists the Members of the National Assembly as of 13 November 2018.

Member	Party	Notes
Cheryllyn Dudley	ACDP	
Kenneth Meshoe	ACDP	
Steven Swart	ACDP	
Mandla Galo	AIC	
Steven Jafta	AIC	
Lulama Ntshayisa	AIC	
Beverley Abrahams	ANC	
Noxolo Abraham-Ntantiso	ANC	Replaced Fezeka Loliwe on 31 July 2018.
Freddie Adams	ANC	
Patricia Adams	ANC	Replaced Zizi Kodwa on 26 May 2014.
Rachel Adams	ANC	Replaced Tina Joemat-Pettersson on 12 April 2017.
Vatiswa Bam-Mugwanya	ANC	
Obed Bapela	ANC	
Joyce Basson	ANC	
Simphiwe Donatus Bekwa	ANC	
Francois Beukman	ANC	
Fezile Bhengu	ANC	
Ruth Bhengu	ANC	
Phumzile Bhengu-Kombe	ANC	
Kate Bilankulu	ANC	
Hendrietta Bogopane-Zulu	ANC	
Bongani Bongo	ANC	
Mnyamezeli Booi	ANC	Replaced Dina Pule on 7 May 2014.
Grace Boroto	ANC	
Alvin Botes	ANC	Replaced Patrick Mabilo on 21 February 2018.
Sfiso Buthelezi	ANC	Replaced Joyce Moloi-Moropa on 29 February 2016.
Ndumiso Capa	ANC	
Rosemary Capa	ANC	
Yunus Carrim	ANC	
Bheki Cele	ANC	
Shakes Cele	ANC	
Hlomane Chauke	ANC	Replaced Itumeleng Mosala on 9 December 2015.
Sindisiwe Chikunga	ANC	
Dorothy Chiloane	ANC	Replaced Hlakudi Frans Nkoana on 24 February 2015.
Fatima Chohan	ANC	
Mamonare Chueu	ANC	
Elsie Coleman	ANC	
Jeremy Cronin	ANC	
Siyabonga Cwele	ANC	
Beauty Dambuza	ANC	Replaced Bonisile Nesi on 14 October 2016.
Rob Davies	ANC	
Thoko Didiza	ANC	
Mervyn Dirks	ANC	
Dorries Dlakude	ANC	
Bathabile Dlamini	ANC	
Sizani Dlamini-Dubazana	ANC	
Nkosazana Dlamini-Zuma	ANC	Replaced Pule Mabe on 7 September 2017.
Ayanda Dlodlo	ANC	
Bongekile Jabulile Dlomo	ANC	
Beauty Dlulane	ANC	
Jabulane Joseph Dube	ANC	Replaced Dipuo Peters on 12 April 2017.
Mary-Ann Dunjwa	ANC	
Ebrahim Ebrahim	ANC	
Zukisa Faku	ANC	
Cedric Frolick	ANC	
Joan Fubbs	ANC	
Dennis Dumisani Gamede	ANC	
Ndabakayise Gcwabaza	ANC	
Malusi Gigaba	ANC	
Nomalungelo Gina	ANC	
Pravin Gordhan	ANC	
Donald Gumede	ANC	
Mondli Gungubele	ANC	Replaced Mzwandile Masina on 5 September 2016.
Derek Hanekom	ANC	
Patekile Holomisa	ANC	
John Jeffery	ANC	
Lulu Johnson	ANC	
Daniel Jabu Kabini	ANC	Replaced Sisi Tolashe on 31 July 2018.
Lerumo Kalako	ANC	
Charles Kekana	ANC	
Ezekiel Kekana	ANC	
Hellen Kekana	ANC	
Maesela David Kekana	ANC	
Pinky Kekana	ANC	
Tandiwe Elizabeth Kenye	ANC	
Lefu Khoarai	ANC	
Dalton Khosa	ANC	
Nthabiseng Khunou	ANC	
Julie Kilian	ANC	Replaced Bongi Ntuli on 30 May 2014.
Gerhard Koornhof	ANC	
Nic Koornhof	ANC	Replaced Pallo Jordan on 12 August 2014.
Zoe Kota-Fredericks	ANC	
Mmamoloko Kubayi-Ngubane	ANC	
Luwellyn Landers	ANC	
Regina Lesoma	ANC	
Dipuo Letsatsi-Duba	ANC	
Zukile Luyenge	ANC	
Sahlulele Luzipo	ANC	
Jerome Maake	ANC	
Xitlhangoma Mabasa	ANC	
Peace Mabe	ANC	(Note: Mabe lost her membership on 6 August 2016 but was not replaced and returned to her seat on 24 February 2017.)
Livhuhani Mabija	ANC	
David Mabuza	ANC	Replaced James Skosana on 26 February 2018.
Andrew Madella	ANC	
Celiwe Madlopha	ANC	
Patrick Maesela	ANC	
Veronica Mafolo	ANC	
Nocawe Mafu	ANC	
Nosilivere Magadla	ANC	
Dikeledi Magadzi	ANC	
Gratitude Magwanishe	ANC	
Tandi Mahambehlala	ANC	
Fish Mahlalela	ANC	
Dikeledi Mahlangu	ANC	
Jabu Mahlangu	ANC	
David Mahlobo	ANC	
Moloko Maila	ANC	
Fikile Majola	ANC	
Thembi Majola	ANC	Replaced Lynne Brown on 30 July 2018.
Lusizo Makhubela-Mashele	ANC	
Zondi Makhubele	ANC	
Thomas Makondo	ANC	
Thabang Makwetla	ANC	
Hope Malgas	ANC	
Nono Maloyi	ANC	Replaced Johanna Maluleke on 3 June 2016.
Joyce Maluleke	ANC	Replaced Polly Boshielo on 23 June 2015.
Buti Manamela	ANC	
Sibongile Manana	ANC	
Mandla Mandela	ANC	
Tozama Mantashe	ANC	
Walter Bongani Maphanga	ANC	Replaced Monwabisi Goqwana on 5 September 2016.
Kebby Maphatsoe	ANC	
Nosiviwe Mapisa-Nqakula	ANC	
Mohlopi Mapulane	ANC	
Ben Martins	ANC	
Siphosezwe Masango	ANC	
Elizabeth Masehela	ANC	
Lindiwe Maseko	ANC	
Candith Mashego-Dlamini	ANC	
Buoang Mashile	ANC	
Amos Masondo	ANC	
Madala Masuku	ANC	
Michael Masutha	ANC	
Joe Maswanganyi	ANC	Replaced Collins Chabane on 27 May 2015.
Cassel Mathale	ANC	
Dudu Mathebe	ANC	
Motswaledi Matlala	ANC	
Mandisa Matshoba	ANC	
Cathrine Matsimbi	ANC	
Risimati Mavunda	ANC	
Humphrey Maxegwana	ANC	
Baleka Mbete	ANC	
Simanga Mbuyane	ANC	Replaced Ngoako Ramatlhodi on 18 April 2017.
Sibongile Mchunu	ANC	
Richard Mdakane	ANC	
Thandi Memela	ANC	
Lesiba Dorah Meso	ANC	Replaced Charles Nqakula on 17 August 2018.
Nomaindia Mfeketo	ANC	
Alina Thandiwe Mfulo	ANC	Replaced Timothy Khoza on 1 September 2017.
Reginah Mhaule	ANC	Replaced Duduzile Manana on 26 February 2018.
Lindiwe Mjobo	ANC	
Hlengiwe Mkhize	ANC	
Zweli Mkhize	ANC	Replaced Trevor Bonhomme on 28 February 2018.
Bongani Mkongi	ANC	
Humphrey Mmemezi	ANC	
Martha Mmola	ANC	Replaced Tito Mboweni on 7 May 2014.
Samuel Mmusi	ANC	
Lungi Mnganga-Gcabashe	ANC	
Derick Mnguni	ANC	
Pumzile Justice Mnguni	ANC	
Velhelmina Mogotsi	ANC	
Nomvula Mokonyane	ANC	Replaced Cyril Ramaphosa on 30 July 2018.
Nthibane Rebecca Mokoto	ANC	
Angie Molebatsi	ANC	
Ellen Molekane	ANC	Replaced Fikile Mbalula on 30 July 2018.
Storey Morutoa	ANC	
Madipoane Mothapo	ANC	
Mathole Motshekga	ANC	
Angie Motshekga	ANC	
Aaron Motsoaledi	ANC	
Terence Mpanza	ANC	Replaced Agnes Qikani on 24 April 2017.
Loyiso Mpumlwana	ANC	Replaced Sbu Ndebele on 30 May 2014.
Jackson Mthembu	ANC	
Nokukhanya Mthembu	ANC	
Nathi Mthethwa	ANC	
Enock Muzi Mthethwa	ANC	
Faith Muthambi	ANC	
Elleck Nchabeleng	ANC	
Claudia Ndaba	ANC	
Stella Ndabeni-Abrahams	ANC	
Busisiwe Clarah Ndlovu	ANC	Replaced Sibusiso Radebe on 17 August 2018.
Nokuzola Ndongeni	ANC	
Andries Nel	ANC	
Wilma Newhoudt-Druchen	ANC	Replaced Stone Sizani on 2 March 2016.
Phumuzile Ngwenya-Mabila	ANC	
Nathi Nhleko	ANC	Replaced Makhosi Khoza on 26 February 2018.
Mogotle Nkadimeng	ANC	
Maite Nkoana-Mashabane	ANC	
Peggy Nkonyeni	ANC	Replaced Beatrice Ngcobo on 26 February 2018.
Theophilus Mbulelo Nkonzo	ANC	Replaced Mcebisi Jonas on 12 April 2017.
Gugile Nkwinti	ANC	
Girly Nobanda	ANC	
Nomathemba Theresia November	ANC	Replaced Nosipho Dorothy Ntwanambi on 21 July 2014.
Madala Ntombela	ANC	
Thulas Nxesi	ANC	
Hildah Nyambi	ANC	Replaced Nomakhaya Mdaka on 14 November 2014.
Blade Nzimande	ANC	
Godfrey Oliphant	ANC	
Mildred Oliphant	ANC	
Gert Oosthuizen	ANC	
Naledi Pandor	ANC	
Ebrahim Patel	ANC	
Joe Phaahla	ANC	
Pinky Phosa	ANC	
Imamile Pikinini	ANC	
Chana Pilane-Majake	ANC	
Bheki Radebe	ANC	
Jeff Radebe	ANC	
Michael Ralegoma	ANC	
Leonard Ramatlakane	ANC	Replaced Jacob Zuma on 22 May 2014.
Daphne Rantho	ANC	
Deborah Dineo Raphuti	ANC	
Nocks Seabi	ANC	Replaced Winnie Madikizela-Mandela on 30 July 2018.
Rosina Semenya	ANC	
Doreen Senokoanyane	ANC	Replaced Paul Mashatile on 5 February 2016.
Connie September	ANC	
Nomvuzo Shabalala	ANC	Replaced Mduduzi Manana on 31 July 2018.
Susan Shabangu	ANC	
Sheila Shope-Sithole	ANC	
Mtikeni Sibande	ANC	
Lindiwe Sisulu	ANC	
Jim Skosana	ANC	Replaced Elvis Siwela on 25 October 2017.
Mcebisi Skwatsha	ANC	
Vincent Smith	ANC	
Maggie Sotyu	ANC	
Enver Surty	ANC	
Elizabeth Thabethe	ANC	
Lerato Cynthia Theko	ANC	Replaced Joyce Mabudafhasi on 1 May 2017.
Barbara Thomson	ANC	
Sello Tleane	ANC	
Thandi Tobias	ANC	
Xoliswa Tom	ANC	
Tshoganetso Tongwane	ANC	Replaced Max Sisulu on 30 May 2014.
Grace Tseke	ANC	
Rembuluwani Tseli	ANC	
Lechesa Tsenoli	ANC	
Pamela Tshwete	ANC	
Sibongile Tsoleli	ANC	
Dikeledi Tsotetsi	ANC	
Agnes Tuck	ANC	Replaced Yolanda Botha on 30 March 2015.
Des van Rooyen	ANC	
Sharome van Schalkwyk	ANC	
Adrian Williams	ANC	Replaced Mantsheng Tsopo on 17 November 2014.
Matthews Wolmarans	ANC	Replaced Brian Molefe on 7 September 2017.
Nhlanhla Xaba	ANC	Replaced Thabo Manyoni on 26 February 2018.
Tokozile Xasa	ANC	
Sheilla Xego	ANC	
Senzeni Zokwana	ANC	
Lindiwe Zulu	ANC	
Mosebenzi Zwane	ANC	Replaced Tete Ramokhoase on 2 September 2015.
Themba Godi	APC	
Andries Plouamma	Agang	
Johannes Mahumapelo	Agang	Replaced Michael Tshishonga on 18 May 2015.
Deidre Carter	COPE	
Mosiuoa Lekota	COPE	
Willie Madisha	COPE	
Derrick America	DA	
Patrick Atkinson	DA	
Michael Bagraim	DA	
Mbulelo Bara	DA	Replaced Makashule Gana on 14 November 2016.
Leonard Basson	DA	
Darren Bergman	DA	
Sonja Boshoff	DA	
Belinda Bozzoli	DA	
Tim Brauteseth	DA	
Glynnis Breytenbach	DA	
Hlomela Bucwa	DA	Replaced Andrew Whitfield on 8 November 2016.
Ghaleb Cachalia	DA	Replaced Heinrich Volmink on 18 April 2017.
Michael Cardo	DA	
Yusuf Cassim	DA	
Roger Chance	DA	
Manuel de Freitas	DA	
Anchen Dreyer	DA	
Shahid Esau	DA	
Malcolm Figg	DA	
Helmar Geyer	DA	Replaced Gavin Davis on 16 October 2018.
Tandeka Gqada	DA	
Herman Groenewald	DA	Replaced Joe McGluwa on 12 November 2015.
Allen Grootboom	DA	
Archibold Figlan	DA	
Thomas Hadebe	DA	Replaced Lindiwe Mazibuko on 7 May 2014.
Geordin Hill-Lewis	DA	
Haniff Hoosen	DA	
Werner Horn	DA	
Rainey Hugo	DA	Replaced Wilmot James on 4 September 2017.
Chris Hunsinger	DA	
Lungiswa James	DA	
Karen Jooste	DA	
Sandy Kalyan	DA	
Angel Khanyile	DA	Replaced Tarnia Baker on 1 December 2017.
Chantel King	DA	Replaced Annette Lovemore on 8 November 2016.
Dianne Kohler Barnard	DA	
Patricia Kopane	DA	
Henro Krüger	DA	
Gregory Krumbock	DA	
Alf Lees	DA	
Jaco Londt	DA	Replaced Zelda Jongbloed on 7 September 2018.
James Lorimer	DA	
Annelie Lotriet	DA	
Cameron Mackenzie	DA	
Dean Macpherson	DA	
Mmusi Maimane	DA	
Richard Majola	DA	
Solly Malatsi	DA	
Erik Marais	DA	
Kobus Marais	DA	
Nomsa Marchesi	DA	
Bridget Masango	DA	Replaced Kenneth Mubu on 6 October 2015.
Choloane David Matsepe	DA	
David Maynier	DA	
Natasha Mazzone	DA	
Thandeka Mbabama	DA	Replaced Nqaba Bhanga on 8 November 2016.
Zakhele Mbhele	DA	
Joe McGluwa	DA	Replaced Carin Visser on 16 August 2018. (Note: McGluwa was elected in May 2014 but resigned on 12 November 2015 before returning in 2018.)
Alan Mcloughlin	DA	
Tsepo Mhlongo	DA	
Kevin Mileham	DA	
Stevens Mokgalapa	DA	
Sej Motau	DA	
Tsholofelo Motshidi	DA	Replaced Brandon Topham on 5 June 2018.
Gwen Ngwenya	DA	Replaced Gordon Mackay on 20 February 2018.
Ross Purdon	DA	Replaced Nosimo Balindlela on 14 November 2016.
Winston Rabotapi	DA	
Ken Robertson	DA	Replaced Suhla James Masango on 6 October 2015.
Denise Robinson	DA	
David Christie Ross	DA	
Dennis Ryder	DA	Replaced Marius Redelinghuys on 1 July 2017.
Hendrik Schmidt	DA	
James Selfe	DA	
Michael Shackleton	DA	Replaced Ian Ollis on 1 September 2018.
Marian Shinn	DA	Replaced Tim Harris on 7 May 2014.
Terri Stander	DA	
John Steenhuisen	DA	
Johanna Steenkamp	DA	
Annette Steyn	DA	
Dirk Stubbe	DA	
Pieter van Dalen	DA	Replaced Lance Greyling on 1 March 2015.
Phumzile van Damme	DA	
Désirée van der Walt	DA	
Andricus van der Westhuizen	DA	
Veronica van Dyk	DA	
Thomas Walters	DA	
Mike Waters	DA	
Lindy Wilson	DA	
Marshall Dlamini	EFF	Replaced Ramakaudi Paul Ramakatsa on 13 April 2015.
Ntokozo Hlonyana	EFF	Replaced Mmabatho Mokause on 1 January 2018.
Godrich Gardee	EFF	
Makoti Khawula	EFF	
Julius Malema	EFF	
Reneiloe Mashabela	EFF	
Leigh-Ann Mathys	EFF	Replaced Asanda Matshobeni on 24 August 2016.
Sam Matiase	EFF	Replaced Khumbuza Bavu on 7 May 2014.
Hlengiwe Mkhaliphi	EFF	
Veronica Mente	EFF	Replaced Rebecca Monchusi on 7 May 2014.
Phillip Mhlongo	EFF	Replaced Diliza Lucky Twala on 17 July 2015.
Fana Mokoena	EFF	Replaced Pumza Ntobongwana on 25 August 2016.
Pebane Moteka	EFF	
Thilivhali Mulaudzi	EFF	
Mbuyiseni Ndlozi	EFF	
Nontando Nolutshungu	EFF	Replaced Moses Mbatha on 5 January 2018.
Natasha Ntlangwini	EFF	
Nazier Paulsen	EFF	Replaced Bernard Daniels Joseph on 20 May 2015.
Thembinkosi Rawula	EFF	Replaced Kgotso Morapela on 31 October 2015.
Floyd Shivambu	EFF	
Primrose Sonti	EFF	
Sophie Thembekwayo	EFF	Replaced Hlayiseka Chewane on 4 January 2017.
Mgcini Tshwaku	EFF	Replaced Shadrack Tlhaole on 1 November 2017.
Zolile Xalisa	EFF	Replaced Abinaar Matlhoko on 24 August 2016.
Yoliswa Yako	EFF	Replaced Vuyokazi Ketabahle on 3 September 2018.
Anton Alberts	FF+	Replaced Jaco Mulder on 7 May 2014.
Pieter Groenewald	FF+	
Corné Mulder	FF+	
Wouter Wessels	FF+	Replaced Pieter Mulder on 1 December 2017.
Elphas Buthelezi	IFP	Replaced Christian Msimang on 1 November 2017.
Mangosuthu Buthelezi	IFP	
Russel Cebekhulu	IFP	Replaced Alfred Mpontshane on 1 August 2015.
Jan Adriaan Esterhuizen	IFP	
Mkhuleko Hlengwa	IFP	
Xolani Ngwezi	IFP	Replaced Albert Mncwango on 15 June 2017.
Sibongile Nkomo	IFP	
Narend Singh	IFP	
Petros Sithole	IFP	
Liezl van der Merwe	IFP	
Nhlanhlakayise Khubisa	NFP	
Sicelo Mabika	NFP	
Zanele kaMagwaza-Msibi	NFP	
Sibusiso Mncwabe	NFP	
Munzoor Shaik Emam	NFP	
Maliyakhe Shelembe	NFP	
Luthando Richmond Mbinda	PAC	Replaced Alton Mphethi on 14 January 2015.
Mncedisi Filtane	UDM	
Bantu Holomisa	UDM	
Nqabayomzi Kwankwa	UDM	
Cynthia Majeke	UDM	Replaced Lennox Gaehler on 7 May 2014.

== Vacancies and replacements ==
The following lists former Members who vacated their seats before 13 November 2018.

Member	Party	Reason	Replacement
Tarnia Baker	DA	Died on 6 October 2017.	Angel Khanyile
Nosimo Balindlela	DA	Resigned on 14 November 2016.	Ross Purdon
Khumbuza Bavu	EFF	Elected but not sworn in.	Sam Matiase
Nqaba Bhanga	DA	Resigned on 6 August 2016.	Thandeka Mbabama
Trevor Bonhomme	ANC	Died on 29 July 2017.	Zweli Mkhize
Polly Boshielo	ANC	Resigned on 5 June 2015.	Joyce Maluleke
Yolanda Botha	ANC	Replaced Raseriti Tau on 7 May 2014; died on 28 December 2014.	Agnes Tuck
Lynne Brown	ANC	Resigned on 27 February 2018.	Thembi Majola
Collins Chabane	ANC	Died on 15 March 2015.	Joe Maswanganyi
Hlayiseka Chewane	EFF	Replaced Khanyisile Litchfield-Tshabalala on 20 May 2015; resigned on 1 January 2017.	Sophie Thembekwayo
Gavin Davis	DA	Resigned on 15 October 2018.	Helmar Geyer
Lennox Gaehler	UDM	Elected but not sworn in.	Cynthia Majeke
Makashule Gana	DA	Resigned on 14 November 2016.	Mbulelo Bara
Dion George	DA	Resigned on 1 June 2015.	Brandon Topham
Monwabisi Goqwana	ANC	Resigned on 27 June 2016.	Walter Bongani Maphanga
Lance Greyling	DA	Resigned on 1 March 2015.	Pieter van Dalen
Tim Harris	DA	Elected but not sworn in.	Marian Shinn
Wilmot James	DA	Resigned on 12 June 2017.	Rainey Hugo
Tina Joemat-Pettersson	ANC	Resigned on 31 March 2017.	Rachel Adams
Mcebisi Jonas	ANC	Resigned on 31 March 2017.	Theophilus Mbulelo Nkonzo
Zelda Jongbloed	DA	Died on 21 July 2018.	Jaco Londt
Pallo Jordan	ANC	Resigned on 7 August 2014.	Nic Koornhof
Bernard Daniels Joseph	EFF	Resigned on 20 May 2015.	Nazier Paulsen
Vuyokazi Ketabahle	EFF	Replaced Magdalene Moonsamy on 21 January 2015; resigned on 31 August 2018.	Yoliswa Yako
Makhosi Khoza	ANC	Lost her membership on 21 September 2017.	Nathi Nhleko
Nicholous Khoza	EFF	Resigned on 24 January 2017.	Shadrack Tlhaole
Timothy Khoza	ANC	Replaced Marthinus van Schalkwyk on 26 May 2014; died on 2 August 2017.	Alina Thandiwe Mfulo
Zizi Kodwa	ANC	Resigned on 26 May 2014.	Patricia Adams
Khanyisile Litchfield-Tshabalala	EFF	Lost her membership on 13 April 2015.	Hlayiseka Chewane
Fezeka Loliwe	ANC	Died on 5 March 2018.	Noxolo Abraham-Ntantiso
Annette Lovemore	DA	Resigned on 6 August 2016.	Chantel King
Pule Mabe	ANC	Resigned on 31 August 2017.	Nkosazana Dlamini-Zuma
Patrick Mabilo	ANC	Resigned on 17 October 2017.	Alvin Botes
Joyce Mabudafhasi	ANC	Resigned on 1 May 2017.	Lerato Cynthia Theko
Gordon Mackay	DA	Resigned on 31 January 2018.	Gwen Ngwenya
Johanna Maluleke	ANC	Resigned on 3 June 2016.	Nono Maloyi
Winnie Madikizela-Mandela	ANC	Died on 2 April 2018.	Nocks Seabi
Duduzile Manana	ANC	Resigned on 26 February 2018.	Reginah Mhaule
Mduduzi Manana	ANC	Resigned on 24 July 2018.	Nomvuzo Shabalala
Thabo Manyoni	ANC	Replaced Maureen Scheepers on 13 September 2016; resigned on 15 May 2017.	Nhlanhla Xaba
Suhla James Masango	DA	Resigned on 26 August 2015.	Ken Robertson
Paul Mashatile	ANC	Resigned on 5 February 2016.	Doreen Senokoanyane
Mzwandile Masina	ANC	Resigned on 23 August 2016.	Mondli Gungubele
Abinaar Matlhoko	EFF	Resigned on 19 August 2016.	Zolile Xalisa
Asanda Matshobeni	EFF	Resigned on 23 August 2016.	Leigh-Ann Mathys
Lindiwe Mazibuko	DA	Elected but not sworn in.	Thomas Hadebe
Fikile Mbalula	ANC	Resigned on 26 February 2018.	Ellen Molekane
Moses Mbatha	EFF	Replaced Mmeli Julius Mdluli on 7 May 2014; resigned on 1 January 2018.	Nontando Nolutshungu
Tito Mboweni	ANC	Elected but not sworn in.	Martha Mmola
Joe McGluwa	DA	Resigned on 12 November 2015.	Herman Groenewald
Nomakhaya Mdaka	ANC	Resigned on 12 November 2014.	Hildah Nyambi
Mmeli Julius Mdluli	EFF	Elected but not sworn in.	Moses Mbatha
Albert Mncwango	IFP	Retired on 15 June 2017.	Xolani Ngwezi
Nokhaya Mnisi	ANC	Died on 18 September 2018.	Vacant
Andile Mngxitama	EFF	Lost his membership on 13 April 2015.	Mmabatho Mokause
Mmabatho Mokause	EFF	Replaced Andile Mngxitama on 13 April 2015; resigned on 1 January 2018.	Ntokozo Hlonyana
Tebogo Mokwele	EFF	Elected but not sworn in.	Pumza Ntobongwana
Brian Molefe	ANC	Replaced Abram Mudau on 14 February 2017; resigned 14 May 2017.	Matthews Wolmarans
Edna Molewa	ANC	Died on 22 September 2018.	Vacant
Joyce Moloi-Moropa	ANC	Resigned on 29 February 2016.	Sfiso Buthelezi
Rebecca Monchusi	EFF	Elected but not sworn in.	Veronica Mente
Magdalene Moonsamy	EFF	Resigned on 12 January 2015.	Vuyokazi Ketabahle
Kgotso Morapela	EFF	Resigned on 31 October 2015.	Thembinkosi Rawula
Itumeleng Mosala	ANC	Resigned on 9 December 2015.	Hlomane Chauke
Malusi Motimele	ANC	Resigned on 30 November 2018.	Vacant
Alton Mphethi	PAC	Lost his membership on 23 December 2014.	Luthando Richmond Mbinda
Alfred Mpontshane	IFP	Resigned on 1 August 2015.	Russel Cebekhulu
Christian Msimang	IFP	Replaced Mario Oriani-Ambrosini on 23 August 2014; retired on 1 November 2017.	Elphas Buthelezi
Kenneth Mubu	DA	Died on 31 August 2015.	Bridget Masango
Abram Mudau	ANC	Resigned on 30 January 2017.	Brian Molefe
Jaco Mulder	FF+	Elected but not sworn in.	Anton Alberts
Pieter Mulder	FF+	Resigned on 1 December 2017.	Wouter Wessels
Sbu Ndebele	ANC	Resigned on 25 May 2014.	Loyiso Mpumlwana
Nhlanhla Nene	ANC	Resigned on 9 October 2018. (Note: Nene had initially resigned on 9 October 2015, but on that occasion he was not replaced and returned to his seat on 26 February 2018.)	Vacant
Bonisile Nesi	ANC	Died on 2 October 2016.	Beauty Dambuza
Beatrice Ngcobo	ANC	Died on 18 February 2018.	Peggy Nkonyeni
Hlakudi Frans Nkoana	ANC	Died on 18 January 2015.	Dorothy Chiloane
Pumza Ntobongwana	EFF	Replaced Tebogo Mokwele on 7 May 2014; resigned on 23 August 2016.	Fana Mokoena
Bongi Ntuli	ANC	Resigned on 25 May 2014.	Julie Kilian
Nosipho Dorothy Ntwanambi	ANC	Died on 8 July 2014.	Nomathemba Theresia November
Charles Nqakula	ANC	Replaced Lulu Xingwana on 30 May 2014; resigned on 18 June 2018.	Lesiba Dorah Meso
Raesibe Nyalungu	ANC	Died on 21 July 2016.	Sisi Tolashe
Ian Ollis	DA	Resigned on 31 August 2018.	Michael Shackleton
Mario Oriani-Ambrosini	IFP	Died on 16 August 2014.	Christian Msimang
Dipuo Peters	ANC	Resigned on 31 March 2017.	Jabulane Joseph Dube
Dina Pule	ANC	Elected but not sworn in.	Mnyamezeli Booi
Agnes Qikani	ANC	Resigned on 5 December 2016.	Terence Mpanza
Sibusiso Radebe	ANC	Died on 19 June 2018.	Busisiwe Clarah Ndlovu
Ramakaudi Paul Ramakatsa	EFF	Lost his membership on 13 April 2015.	Marshall Dlamini
Cyril Ramaphosa	ANC	Elected President of South Africa on 15 February 2018.	Nomvula Mokonyane
Ngoako Ramatlhodi	ANC	Resigned on 31 March 2017.	Simanga Mbuyane
Tete Ramokhoase	ANC	Resigned on 2 September 2015.	Mosebenzi Zwane
Mamphela Ramphele	Agang	Elected but not sworn in.	Michael Tshishonga
Marius Redelinghuys	DA	Resigned on 1 July 2017.	Dennis Ryder
Maureen Scheepers	ANC	Resigned on 30 June 2016.	Thabo Manyoni
Max Sisulu	ANC	Resigned on 29 May 2014.	Tshoganetso Tongwane
Elvis Siwela	ANC	Resigned on 20 September 2017.	Jim Skosana
Stone Sizani	ANC	Resigned on 2 March 2016.	Wilma Newhoudt-Druchen
James Skosana	ANC	Resigned on 26 February 2018.	David Mabuza
Raseriti Tau	ANC	Elected but not sworn in.	Yolanda Botha
Juanita Terblanche	DA	Lost her membership on 7 September 2017.	Carin Visser
Shadrack Tlhaole	EFF	Replaced Nicholous Khoza on 1 February 2017; resigned 31 October 2017.	Mgcini Tshwaku
Sisi Tolashe	ANC	Replaced Raesibe Nyalungu on 5 September 2016; resigned on 25 February 2018.	Daniel Jabu Kabini
Brandon Topham	DA	Replaced Dion George on 6 October 2015; resigned on 19 March 2018.	Tsholofelo Motshidi
Michael Tshishonga	Agang	Replaced Mamphela Ramphele on 7 May 2014; lost his membership on 28 February 2015.	Johannes Mahumapelo
Mantsheng Tsopo	ANC	Resigned on 1 October 2014.	Adrian Williams
Diliza Lucky Twala	EFF	Resigned on 16 July 2015.	Phillip Mhlongo
Marthinus van Schalkwyk	ANC	Resigned on 25 May 2014.	Timothy Khoza
Carin Visser	DA	Replaced Juanita Terblanche on 1 December 2017; resigned on 16 August 2018.	Joe McGluwa
Heinrich Volmink	DA	Resigned on 14 March 2017.	Ghaleb Cachalia
James Vos	DA	Resigned on 11 November 2018.	Vacant
Andrew Whitfield	DA	Resigned on 6 August 2016.	Hlomela Bucwa
Lulu Xingwana	ANC	Resigned on 25 May 2014.	Charles Nqakula
Lumka Yengeni	ANC	Resigned on 2 October 2017.	Vacant
Jacob Zuma	ANC	Elected President of South Africa on 21 May 2014.	Leonard Ramatlakane

== See also ==
- Presidency of Jacob Zuma
- Zondo Commission
- List of National Council of Provinces members of the 26th Parliament of South Africa
