= List of members of the National Assembly of South Africa who died in office =

The following is a list of members of the National Assembly of South Africa who died in office since the chamber's establishment following the introduction of universal suffrage in South Africa in 1994.

== 22nd Parliament (1994–1999) ==
Member	Party	Constituency	Date of death	Age at death (years)	Cause
Feroza Adam	ANC		9 August 1994	32	Road accident
Thomas Nkobi	ANC		25 September 1994	71	Stroke
Joe Slovo	ANC		6 January 1995	68	Bone marrow cancer
Gert Myburgh	National	Eastern Cape	11 March 1996	56	Heart attack
Collins Ramusi	ANC		July 1996		Heart attack
Arrie van Rensburg	National		2 April 1998	68	Road accident
Archie Gumede	ANC		June 1998	84	

== 23rd Parliament (1999–2004) ==
Member	Party	Constituency	Date of death	Age at death (years)	Cause
Mthunzi Vilakazi	ANC	Mpumalanga	16 February 2000	44	Kidney and liver failure
Themba Khoza	IFP		28 May 2000	41	
Bheki Mkhize	ANC		30 July 2000	47	Shot in a police raid
Cengi Mahlalela	ANC	Mpumalanga	6 December 2000	43	
Fihli Mbongo	ANC	Gauteng	29 December 2000	32	
Isaiah Ntshangase	ANC	KwaZulu-Natal	1 February 2001	31	
Steve Tshwete	ANC		26 April 2002	63	
Peter Mokaba	ANC		9 June 2002	43	Pneumonia
Magwaza Maphalala	ANC	KwaZulu-Natal	5 February 2003	54	
Ntombi Shope	ANC		13 August 2003	53	
Dullah Omar	ANC		13 March 2004	69	Cancer

== 24th Parliament (2004–2009) ==
Member	Party	Constituency	Date of death	Age at death (years)	Cause
Sarel Haasbroek	DA	Western Cape	16 October 2005		
Stella Sigcau	ANC	National	7 May 2006	69	Heart disease
Vincent Mabuyakhulu	ANC	KwaZulu-Natal	12 July 2006	47	
Malizole Diko	United Independent Front	National	28 July 2006		
James Kati	ANC	Eastern Cape	29 September 2006	82	
Nhlanhla Zulu	IFP	KwaZulu-Natal	15 June 2007	67	
Zipporah Nawa	ANC	National	5 November 2007	62	
John Gomomo	ANC	Eastern Cape	22 January 2008	61	
Ncumisa Kondlo	ANC	Eastern Cape	24 March 2008	49	

== 25th Parliament (2009–2014) ==
Member	Party	Constituency	Date of death	Age at death (years)	Cause
Nomvula Shoba	ANC	Eastern Cape	11 May 2009	52	Heart failure
Frans Masango	ANC	Gauteng	18 September 2009	51	Diabetes
Cobus Schmidt	DA	Free State	23 November 2009		Road accident
Manto Tshabalala-Msimang	ANC	National	26 December 2009	69	Complications from a liver transplant
Molefi Sefularo	ANC	North West	5 April 2010	52	Road accident
Alina Rantsolase	ANC	National	3 November 2010	56	
Bertha Gxowa	ANC	Gauteng	19 November 2010	75	
Jack Tolo	COPE	National	22 August 2011	62	Shot in a robbery
Mavis Magazi	ANC	Gauteng	11 November 2011	48	Cancer
Mavis Matladi	UCDP	National	2 December 2011	53	
Sicelo Shiceka	ANC	National	30 April 2012	45	
Florence Nyanda	ANC	Mpumalanga	5 May 2012		
Roy Padayachie	ANC	National	5 May 2012	62	
Mandla Mbili	ANC	KwaZulu-Natal	10 July 2012	48	Road accident
Ntopile Kganyago	UDM	National	17 July 2013		
Crosby Moni	ANC	National	22 December 2013		Malaria

== 26th Parliament (2014–2019) ==
Member	Party	Constituency	Date of death	Age at death (years)	Cause
Nosipho Ntwanambi	ANC		8 July 2014	54	
Mario Oriani-Ambrosini	IFP		16 August 2014		Lung cancer
Yolanda Botha	ANC		28 December 2014		Melanoma
Hlakudi Frans Nkoana	ANC		19 January 2015		
Collins Chabane	ANC		15 March 2015	54	Road accident
Kenneth Mubu	DA		31 August 2015		
Raesibe Nyalungu	ANC		21 July 2016		
Bonisile Nesi	ANC	Eastern Cape	2 October 2016	51	
Trevor Bonhomme	ANC	KwaZulu-Natal	29 July 2017	75	Cancer
Timothy Khoza	ANC		2 August 2017		Road accident
Tarnia Baker	DA		6 October 2017	50	Struck by a truck
Beatrice Ngcobo	ANC	KwaZulu-Natal	18 February 2018	74	Complications from surgery
Fezeka Loliwe	ANC	Eastern Cape	5 March 2018	53	Road accident
Winnie Madikizela-Mandela	ANC		2 April 2018	81	Diabetes
Sibusiso Radebe	ANC		19 June 2018	40	Shot in a suspected robbery
Zelda Jongbloed	DA		21 July 2018	67	Cancer
Nokhaya Mnisi	ANC		18 September 2018		
Edna Molewa	ANC		22 September 2018	61	
Bavelile Hlongwa	ANC	KwaZulu-Natal	13 September 2019	38	Struck by a truck

== 27th Parliament (2019–2024) ==
Member	Party	Constituency	Date of death	Age at death (years)	Cause
Dora Dlamini	ANC	KwaZulu-Natal	10 June 2020	57	COVID-19
Thandi Mpambo-Sibhukwana	DA	Western Cape	19 June 2020		COVID-19
Zamuxolo Peter	ANC	Eastern Cape	31 July 2020	55	COVID-19
Hisamodien Mohamed	ANC	Western Cape	24 August 2020	55	Heart attack
Belinda Bozzoli	DA	Gauteng	19 June 2020	74	Cancer
Pumza Dyantyi	ANC	Eastern Cape	7 December 2020	72	COVID-19
Loyiso Mpumlwana	ANC	KwaZulu-Natal	23 December 2020	57	COVID-19
Nomvuzo Shabalala	IFP	KwaZulu-Natal	26 December 2020	60	COVID-19
Nombulelo Hermans	ANC	National	18 January 2021	51	COVID-19
Jackson Mthembu	ANC	National	21 January 2021	62	COVID-19
Tozama Mantashe	ANC	Eastern Cape	31 January 2021	60	COVID-19
Jacqueline Mofokeng	ANC	Gauteng	22 April 2021	61	COVID-19
Tshoganetso Tongwane	ANC	National	19 May 2021		COVID-19
Cameron Mackenzie	DA	Gauteng	7 July 2021	60	COVID-19
Joyce Maluleke	ANC	Limpopo	16 July 2021	60	COVID-19
Lulama Ntshayisa	AIC	National	23 July 2021	62	COVID-19
Mthokozisi Nxumalo	IFP	KwaZulu-Natal	1 August 2021	32	Road accident
Kebby Maphatsoe	ANC	National	31 August 2021	58	Heart attack
Hlengiwe Mkhize	ANC	National	16 September 2021	69	Lung cancer
Duma Nkosi	ANC	Gauteng	16 December 2021	64	
Maggie Tlou	ANC	Gauteng	3 February 2022	64	
Mxolisa Sokatsha	ANC	National	25 March 2022	57	Road accident
Tina Joemat-Pettersson	ANC	National	5 June 2023	59	
Mangosuthu Buthelezi	IFP	National	9 September 2023	95	
Mzwakhe Sibisi	NFP	KwaZulu-Natal	18 October 2023	53	
Alice Mthembu	ANC	KwaZulu-Natal	26 December 2023	64	Road accident
Violet Siwela	ANC	National	18 January 2024	67	

== 28th Parliament (2024–present) ==
Member	Party	Constituency	Date of death	Age at death (years)	Cause
Sbuyiselwe Angela Buthelezi	IFP	National	21 October 2024	55	
Lungi Gcabashe	ANC	National	18 May 2025	64	
Nkosentsha Shezi	MK	KwaZulu-Natal	23 March 2026	50	
Edward Ntshingila	MK	National	4 June 2026		
