= Fezeka Loliwe =

South African politician (d. 2018)

Member of the National Assembly of South Africa
- In office 21 May 2014 – 5 March 2018
- Succeeded by: Phoebe Noxolo Abraham
- Constituency: Eastern Cape

Personal details
- Born: 17 August 1964 Frankfort, King Williamstown, Cape Province, South Africa
- Died: 5 March 2018 (aged 53) Alice, Eastern Cape, South Africa
- Party: African National Congress; South African Communist Party
- Profession: Educator; Politician

Fezeka Sister Loliwe (17 August 1964 – 5 March 2018) was a South African politician and African National Congress member who served as a member of the National Assembly of South Africa between 2014 and her death in 2018. She was chairperson of the Portfolio Committee on Labour at the time of her death. Loliwe was also a member of the South African Communist Party and served on the party's Central Committee.

== Early life and education ==
Loliwe was born on 17 August 1964 in the village of Frankfort outside King Williamstown in the present-day Eastern Cape. She attended Lennox Sebe College of Education (later renamed to Griffiths Mxenge College of Education), but was expelled as a student in 1986 due to her participation in anti-apartheid activities. She would later go on to earn her teaching qualification at the Dr WB Rubusana College of Education in Mdantsane outside East London.

== Political career ==
=== Involvement in SADTU ===
After training as a teacher, Loliwe became a member of the South African Democratic Teachers Union. She was later elected a site steward and deputy secretary of a SADTU branch. Loliwe would soon move up the union's leadership ranks, becoming Provincial Deputy Secretary, acting provincial secretary, provincial secretary, before becoming SADTU's vice president for Sports, Arts and Culture.

=== Career in the African National Congress ===
Loliwe started her career in the African National Congress as the secretary of party's branch in King Williamstown. At the time of her death, she was a member of the party's Regional Executive Committee (REC) in the Dr WB Rubasana region.

=== Career in the SACP ===
Loliwe was a member of the Provincial Executive Committee (PEC) and the Provincial Working Committee (PWC) of the South African Communist Party in the Eastern Cape until her election to the party's Central Committee in July 2012 at the party's 13th congress. She was re-elected to another five-year term on the Central Committee in July 2017 at the party's 14th congress.

== Parliamentary career ==
In 2014, Loliwe was elected to the National Assembly of South Africa, ranked 11th on the ANC's regional-to-national list in the Eastern Cape. She was appointed to the Portfolio Committee on Labour after her swearing-in. In 2016, she became a member of the SABC Parliamentary Inquiry Ad Hoc Committee. In October of the following year, she was elected chairperson of the Portfolio Committee on Labour after serving as the committee's whip for four years. Loliwe was also a whip of the ANC's caucus disciplinary committee.

== Death ==
Loliwe died in a car accident on 5 March 2018 near the town of Alice in the Eastern Cape. She had been en route in her Jeep Cherokee to East London from her parliamentary constituency in Fort Beaufort. She was in the process of overtaking another vehicle but lost control of her vehicle when she attempted to return to her lane. Her car left the road, travelled over a bridge before overturning and landing in a muddy riverbank. She was 53 years old at the time of her death. Her funeral was held on 11 March 2018. She was the second ANC MP to die within a month; the other being Beatrice Ngcobo.

== See also ==
- List of members of the National Assembly of South Africa who died in office
