= Cheryl Phillips (politician) =

South African politician

Shadow Deputy Minister on the Standing Committee on the Auditor General
- In office 21 April 2023 – 28 May 2024
- Leader: John Steenhuisen
- Preceded by: Patricia Kopane
- Succeeded by: Position vacant

Shadow Deputy Minister of Environment, Forestry and Fisheries
- In office 5 December 2020 – 21 April 2023
- Leader: John Steenhuisen
- Preceded by: Hannah Winkler
- Succeeded by: Annerie Weber

Shadow Deputy Minister of Mineral Resources and Energy
- In office 5 June 2019 – 5 December 2020
- Leader: John Steenhuisen; Mmusi Maimane
- Preceded by: Position created (Tandeka Gqada as Shadow Deputy Minister of Energy)
- Succeeded by: Position abolished

Member of the National Assembly of South Africa
- Incumbent
- Assumed office 22 May 2019

Personal details
- Born: 23 February 1962 (age 64)
- Party: Democratic Alliance
- Profession: Politician

Cheryl Phillips (born 23 February 1962) is a South African politician from the North West who served in the National Assembly from May 2019 until May 2024. A member of the Democratic Alliance, she was the Shadow Deputy Minister of Mineral Resources and Energy from June 2019 to December 2020, the Shadow Deputy Minister of Environment, Forestry and Fisheries from December 2020 until April 2023 and the Shadow Deputy Minister of the Standing Committee on the Auditor General from April 2023 until May 2024. Phillips had previously served as a ward councillor in Rustenburg.

== Political career ==
Phillips campaigned for the "Yes" vote in the 1992 referendum. She moved to Rustenburg in 2001 and joined the Democratic Party. She later joined the Democratic Alliance.

In 2014, she was appointed to her ward's committee. Phillips was elected as the ward councillor for ward 16 in a by-election in January 2016.

== Parliamentary career ==
In 2019, she was elected to the National Assembly of South Africa on the regional list of the DA. On 5 June 2019, she was appointed as the party's Shadow Deputy Minister of Mineral Resources and Energy.

In December 2020, she was appointed Shadow Deputy Minister of Environment, Forestry and Fisheries in the new Shadow Cabinet led by John Steenhuisen.

Phillips was appointed as Shadow Deputy Minister on the Standing Committee on the Auditor-General and as an Additional Member on Mineral Resources and Energy, with a focus on illegal mining on 21 April 2023.

Phillips did not stand for re-election to the National Assembly at the 2024 general election.

=== Committee membership ===
- Portfolio Committee on Environment, Forestry and Fisheries
- Portfolio Committee on Mineral Resources and Energy

== Personal life ==
Phillips is married and has children.
