= Pro Khoza =

South African politician (born 1976)

Pro Khoza MP

Member of the National Assembly of South Africa
- In office May 2014 – February 2017
- Constituency: Mpumalanga

Personal details
- Born: Nicholous Pro Khoza; 17 December 1976 (age 49) Badplaas, Mpumalanga, South Africa
- Party: African National Congress (2006-2013); Economic Freedom Fighters (2013-2017); Mayibuye Consultation (2025 -present)
- Education: Sunduza Combined School
- Occupation: Politician, businessman
- Committees: Portfolio Committee on Defence and Military Veterans

Nicholous Pro Khoza (born 17 December 1976) is a South African politician who served as a member of the National Assembly from 2014 to 2017 for the Economic Freedom Fighters (EFF). In Parliament, Khoza served as a member of the Portfolio Committee on Defence and Military Veterans. He is currently one of the leaders of Floyd Shivambu's Mayibuye Consultation process.

Khoza led in the Young Communist League of South Africa (YCL) with Sibusiso Radebe and served as the councilor of Badplaas for the African National Congress (ANC) from 2006 to 2011.

When Julius Malema formed the EFF, Khoza became a co-ordinator of the EFF in Mpumalanga from 2013 until his election as member of the National Assembly in the 2014 South African general election.

After quitting politics in 2019, Khoza went into business. In 2024, he joined Jacob Zuma's uMkhonto weSizwe Party (MKP). On 27 June 2025, Khoza was announced as one of the political strategists for Shivambu's defecting Mayibuye Consultation.
