= Hlayiseka Chewane =

South African medical doctor

Dr Hlayiseka Chewane

14 Coubrough Rd, Noordwyk, Midrand, 1687

Personal details
- Born: Hlayiseka Crucief Chewane
- Education: MEDUNSA
- Occupation: Medical doctor GP

Hlayiseka Crucief Chewane is a South African medical doctor

== Biography ==
Chewane was a member of the Students' Representative Council (SRC) of MEDUNSA for three consecutive terms and served as president for one term. He qualified as a medical doctor and has practiced in the public and private sectors.

Chewane joined the Economic Freedom Fighters in 2013. He attended the party's Policy Conference as well as the National Assembly on "What is to be Done". He was elected to the EFF Central Command Team (CCT), the party's highest decision-making structure between conferences, at the party's first National Peoples Assembly in December 2014. In June 2015, he was sworn in as a Member of the National Assembly of South Africa; he filled the casual vacancy that arose when Khanyisile Litchfield-Tshabalala was expelled from the EFF. Chewane was appointed to serve on the Portfolio Committee on Health.

Chewane resigned from the National Assembly on 1 January 2017 and Sophie Thembekwayo was appointed to take up his seat. He unsuccessfully stood as an EFF parliamentary candidate in the 2019 national and provincial elections.
