= Petronella Duncan =

South African politician

Petronella Duncan MP

Shadow Deputy Minister of Human Settlements
- Leader: Helen Zille
- Succeeded by: Tandeka Gqada

Member of Parliament for Western Cape
- In office 6 May 2009 – 2014

Personal details
- Party: Democratic Alliance

Petronella Catherine Duncan, also known as Patty Duncan, is a South African politician. She is a former member of the Western Cape Provincial Parliament Member of Parliament with the Democratic Alliance. She is the former Shadow Deputy Minister of Human Settlements.

Political offices
Preceded by ??	South African Shadow Deputy Minister Women, Youth, Children and People with Disabilities; 2009–2014	Incumbent
