= Malcolm Figg =

South African politician

Member of the Eastern Cape Provincial Legislature
- Incumbent
- Assumed office 14 June 2024

Member of the National Assembly of South Africa
- In office 21 May 2014 – 7 May 2019

Personal details
- Born: Malcolm John Figg
- Party: Democratic Alliance
- Profession: Politician

Malcolm John Figg is a South African politician currently serving as a member of the Eastern Cape Provincial Legislature for the Democratic Alliance.

He had previously served as the municipality's Member of the Mayoral Committee (MMC) for Budget and Treasury from 2020 to 2021. From 2014 to 2019, he was a Member of the National Assembly of South Africa. Figg served as the DA's shadow minister for public works from 2017 to 2019.

== Political career ==
Figg was elected to the National Assembly of South Africa in the 2014 general elections as a member of the Democratic Alliance. Having entered parliament, he was assigned to the Standing Committee on Appropriations. On 14 May 2017, Figg was elected the provincial finance chairman of the DA in the Eastern Cape.

On 1 June 2017, Figg was appointed as the DA's Shadow Minister of Public Works by party leader Mmusi Maimane. He replaced Patricia Kopane, who was moved to the health portfolio, while Alan Mcloughlin succeeded Figg as the party's Shadow Minister of Appropriations.

Figg unsuccessfully stood for re-election in the 2019 general elections, having been ranked low on the DA's candidate lists. Figg entered the Nelson Mandela Bay council as a DA councillor shortly after the election. He replaced Victor Manyati's whose party membership was terminated.

Following DA councillor Nqaba Bhanga's election as mayor of the municipality in December 2020, Figg was appointed as the member of the mayoral committee responsible for budget and treasury. Figg was elected to a full term as a councillor in the 2021 municipal elections. By June 2022, Figg was serving as the DA NMB Spokesperson for Budget & Treasury.
