= Babalwa Mathulelwa =

South African politician

Babalwa Mathulelwa MP

Member of the National Assembly of South Africa
- Incumbent
- Assumed office June 2020
- Preceded by: Thilivhali Mulaudzi

Personal details
- Party: Economic Freedom Fighters

Babalwa Mathulelwa is a South African politician serving as a Member of the National Assembly since June 2020. She is a party representative of the Economic Freedom Fighters.

== Biography ==
Mathulelwa had worked as a domestic worker, cashier and a monitoring practitioner for the Eastern Cape Department of Transport, prior to becoming active in politics. She joined the EFF and became a branch chairperson. She was an additional member of the party's Alfred Nzo Regional Command Team.

In December 2019, Mathulelwa was elected to serve on the Central Command Team, the EFF's highest decision-making structure, as an additional member.

In June 2020, Mathulelwa was sworn in as a Member of the National Assembly. As of July 2020, she serves on the Portfolio Committee on Small Business Development.
