= Leigh-Ann Mathys =

South African politician

- Mathys in 2026

Deputy Secretary-General of the Economic Freedom Fighters
- Incumbent
- Assumed office 2024

Treasurer-General of the Economic Freedom Fighters
- In office 2014 – December 2019
- Succeeded by: Omphile Maotwe

Member of the National Assembly of South Africa
- Incumbent
- Assumed office 2014
- Constituency: North West

Personal details
- Party: Economic Freedom Fighters
- Profession: Politician

Leigh-Ann Mathys is a South African politician from the Economic Freedom Fighters. She was recently elected deputy secretary general. She previously served as treasurer-general of the Economic Freedom Fighters until December 2019, when she was succeeded by Omphile Maotwe. She was elected to the Parliament of South Africa in North West in the 2014 South African general election.

== See also ==
- List of National Assembly members of the 26th Parliament of South Africa
