= Hannah Lidgett =

South African politician (born 1985)

Hannah Lidgett MPL

Shadow deputy minister of environment, forestry and fisheries
- In office 5 June 2019 – 5 December 2020
- Succeeded by: Cheryl Phillips

Member of the National Assembly of South Africa
- In office 22 May 2019 – 28 May 2024

Member of the KwaZulu-Natal Legislature
- Incumbent
- Assumed office 14 June 2024

Personal details
- Born: Hannah Shameema Winkler; 5 November 1985 (age 40)
- Party: Democratic Alliance
- Profession: Politician

Hannah Shameema Lidgett (née Winkler; born 5 November 1985) is a South African politician who has been a member of the KwaZulu-Natal Legislature since 2024 where she represents the Democratic Alliance. She formerly represented the DA in parliament between 2019 and 2024 and served as the party's shadow deputy minister of environment, forestry and fisheries between 2019 and 2020.

== Education ==
Lidgett has an honours degree in politics.

== Political career ==
Lidgett joined the Democratic Alliance as a researcher and media officer. For the 2019 general election, she was the party's campaign manager in the eThekwini Metropolitan Municipality.

== Parliamentary career ==
In the build-up to the 2019 general election, Lidgett was placed eighth on the DA's regional list, 28th on the party's provincial list and 76th on the party's national list. She was elected to the National Assembly on the regional list and became a member of parliament on 22 May 2019.

On 5 June 2019, the DA parliamentary leader, Mmusi Maimane, appointed Lidgett to the post of shadow deputy minister of environment, forestry and fisheries. Later that month, she was appointed to that specific portfolio's committee.

On 5 December 2020, she was appointed as an additional deputy member to the tourism portfolio of the John Steenhuisen's shadow cabinet.

Lidgett became an Additional Member on the Forestry, Fisheries and the Environment portfolio of Steenhuisen's shadow cabinet on 21 April 2023.

At the DA's provincial elective congress held on 29 April 2023 at the Durban International Convention Centre, Lidgett successfully stood for deputy provincial chairperson of the party.

In the 2024 national and provincial elections, Lidgett was elected to the KwaZulu-Natal Legislature. She was appointed deputy caucus whip and the party's spokeswoman on economic development, tourism and environmental affairs.
