= Sarel Haasbroek =

South African politician

Member of the National Assembly
- In office 23 April 2004 – 16 October 2005

Personal details
- Died: 16 October 2005
- Citizenship: South Africa
- Party: Democratic Alliance

Sarel Francois Haasbroek (died 16 October 2005) was a South African politician who represented the Democratic Alliance (DA) in the National Assembly from April 2004 until his death in October 2005. He was elected to his seat in the 2004 general election, serving the Western Cape constituency. He died on 16 October 2005 and his seat was filled by Isaac Julies.

== See also ==
- List of members of the National Assembly of South Africa who died in office
