= Tsholofelo Motshidi-Bodlani =

South African politician

Tsholofelo Motshidi-Bodlani MP

Member of the National Assembly of South Africa
- Incumbent
- Assumed office 17 March 2021
- Preceded by: Mike Waters
- In office 18 March 2018 – 7 May 2019
- Preceded by: Brandon Topham

Personal details
- Party: Democratic Alliance
- Occupation: Member of Parliament
- Profession: Politician

Tsholofelo Katlego Motshidi-Bodlani is a South African politician from Gauteng. She is currently a member of the National Assembly for the Democratic Alliance.

== Political career ==
Motshidi-Bodlani had served as a Democratic Alliance councillor in the Ekurhuleni Metropolitan Municipality. She stood for election to the Gauteng Provincial Legislature in the 2014 election as 46th on the DA's list. Due to the DA's electoral performance, she was not elected.

On 18 March 2018, Motshidi-Bodlani entered the National Assembly, the lower house of parliament, as a replacement for Brandon Topham, a DA MP who had resigned. She was then named to the Portfolio Committee on Science and Technology in October 2018.

Prior to the 2019 general elections, Motshidi-Bodlani was placed 127th on the DA's National Assembly list, 40th on the DA's Gauteng list of National Assembly candidates, and 30th on the DA's list for the provincial legislature. She was not elected to parliament or the provincial legislature.

On 17 March 2021, Motshidi-Bodlani returned to the National Assembly as a replacement for Mike Waters.
