= Thilivhali Mulaudzi =

South African politician (born 1964)

Thilivhali Elphus Mulaudzi

Member of the National Assembly of South Africa
- In office 7 May 2014 – 2 March 2020
- Succeeded by: Babalwa Mathulelwa

Personal details
- Born: 1 August 1964 (age 61) Johannesburg, South Africa
- Party: African National Congress (since 2021)
- Other political affiliations: Economic Freedom Fighters (until 2021)
- Profession: Politician

Thilivhali Elphus Mulaudzi (born August 1964) is a South African politician. He served as an MP from the Economic Freedom Fighters from 2014 to 2020. In 2021, he joined the African National Congress.

== See also ==
- List of National Assembly members of the 26th Parliament of South Africa
- List of National Assembly members of the 27th Parliament of South Africa
