= Lungiswa James =

South African politician

Member of the National Assembly of South Africa
- In office 21 May 2014 – 7 May 2019
- Constituency: Western Cape

Personal details
- Party: Democratic Alliance

Lungiswa Veronica James is a South African politician from the Democratic Alliance (DA).

She was Shadow Deputy Minister for Health in the Shadow Cabinet of Mmusi Maimane.

== See also ==
- List of National Assembly members of the 26th Parliament of South Africa
