= Isaac Julies =

South African politician

Member of the National Assembly
- In office 22 February 2006 – May 2009
- Constituency: Western Cape

Personal details
- Born: Isaac Frederick Julies; 12 March 1952 (age 74)
- Citizenship: South Africa
- Party: Democratic Alliance

Isaac Frederick Julies (born 12 March 1952) is a South African politician who represented the Democratic Alliance (DA) in the National Assembly from 2006 to 2009. Though not initially elected in 2004, he was sworn in on 22 February 2006 to fill the casual vacancy arising from Sarel Haasbroek's death. He represented the Western Cape constituency and was the DA's spokesperson on public service and administration.
