= Tebogo Mokwele =

South African politician

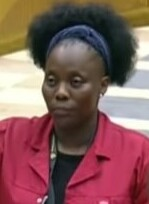
- Mokwele in 2019

Member of the National Assembly of South Africa
- In office 22 May 2019 – 19 August 2019
- Succeeded by: Omphile Maotwe

Permanent Delegate to the National Council of Provinces from the North West
- In office 22 May 2014 – 7 May 2019

Personal details
- Party: Economic Freedom Fighters

Tebogo Josephine Mokwele is a South African politician who served in the National Assembly of South Africa from May to August 2019 as a member of the Economic Freedom Fighters party. Prior to serving in the National Assembly, Mokwele had been a permanent delegate to the National Council of Provinces from the North West from 2014 to 2019.

== Early life ==
Mokwele was born in Swartruggens in the present-day North West. Her mother worked at a clinic, while her father was an artist. She started her political career at 14.

== Political career ==
Mokwele joined the Economic Freedom Fighters and was named to the party's central command team, the party's highest decision-making structure in 2013.

== Parliamentary career ==
Mokwele stood for the National Assembly in the 2014 national and provincial elections and was elected to the lower house of parliament as the EFF won 25 seats. Mokwele was, however, elected by the North West Provincial Legislature as an EFF permanent delegate to the National Council of Provinces, the upper house of parliament. She was then appointed Whip of the EFF caucus in the NCOP.

In August 2015, Mokwele was forcefully removed from the NCOP by security after she refused to leave the chamber following an instruction from the sergeant-at-arms. She was the first MP to be removed using the new parliamentary rules.

Mokwele continued serving in the NCOP until the May 2019 general election when she was elected to the National Assembly. She was appointed to the Portfolio Committee on Labour and Employment and the Joint Standing Committee on the Financial Management of Parliament.

=== Resignation ===
On 18 August 2019, the EFF revealed that Mokwele had received R40,000 from ANC president Cyril Ramaphosa's CR17 presidential campaign account. It later emerged that Mokwele had received R80,000 and not just R40,000 from Ramaphosa. She had received money from Ramaphosa on two occasions: in 2017 when she was part of a parliamentary project and in 2019 when she received money for a personal bereavement. The following day, she and fellow EFF MP Nkagisang Mokgosi, who had also received money from Ramaphosa, submitted their resignation from Parliament and the EFF Central Command Team. Mokwele said in her resignation letter that she did not inform the EFF leadership but later said in an interview with journalist Stephen Grootes that she did inform the EFF leadership, contradicting her resignation statement.

== Personal life ==
In 2019, it was revealed that Mokwele had suffered a miscarriage in 2016 after having been removed by parliamentary security for saying that president Jacob Zuma was not fit to address NCOP members.
