= Nqabayomzi Kwankwa =

South African politician

Nqabayomzi Kwankwa MP
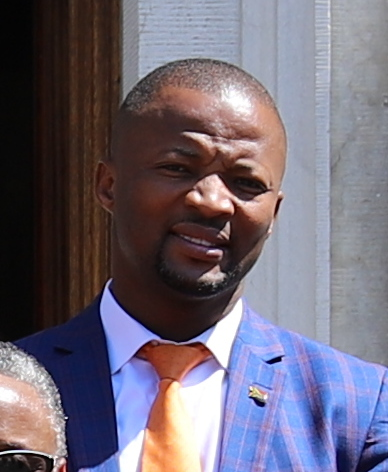
- Kwankwa in 2023

Deputy President of the United Democratic Movement
- Incumbent
- Assumed office 3 December 2016
- President: Bantu Holomisa
- Preceded by: Khanyisile Litchfield-Tshabalala

Deputy Secretary-General of the United Democratic Movement
- In office 19 December 2010 – 14 December 2015
- President: Bantu Holomisa
- Preceded by: Unknown
- Succeeded by: Bongani Maqungwana

Member of the National Assembly of South Africa
- Incumbent
- Assumed office 6 August 2013
- Constituency: Eastern Cape

Personal details
- Born: Nqabayomzi Lawrence Saziso Kwankwa Cape Province, South Africa
- Party: United Democratic Movement (2007–present)
- Other political affiliations: African National Congress (Until 2006)
- Children: 5

Nqabayomzi Lawrence Saziso Kwankwa is a South African politician from the Eastern Cape. He has been serving as a Member of the National Assembly of South Africa for the United Democratic Movement (UDM) since August 2013. He is the deputy president of the UDM and the party's chief whip.

== Early life and education ==
Kwankwa was born in the previous Cape Province, now the Eastern Cape. He grew up in poverty. His father was also a polygamist. He later moved to Cape Town in the 1990s and was homeless for a short time. Due to his financial situation, he could not attend his father's funeral and burial in Middledrift, Eastern Cape, in 1999.

Kwankwa soon found work as a cleaner and security guard. He attended university and achieved a degree in Economics. He proceeded to work in the banking sector before becoming a politician.

== Political career ==
Kwankwa's family were supporters of the African National Congress (ANC). He was a member of the South African Student Congress (SASCO) and participated in SASCO activities, while at university. He left the ANC in 2006 and joined the UDM in 2007.

Kwankwa became a politician in 2009. In 2010, he was elected Deputy Secretary-General of the UDM. He was sworn in as a Member of Parliament in August 2013. He won a full term in May 2014 and became chief whip of the party's parliamentary caucus.

Kwankwa challenged Khanyisile Litchfield-Tshabalala for the post of UDM deputy president in December 2015 and Litchfield-Tshabalala won the election. A year later, in December 2016, Kwankwa was elected to the post following the resignation of Litchfield-Tshabalala. After the 2019 general election, Kwankwa was sworn in for another term as an MP. He remains the party's chief whip. Kwankwa was re-elected to another term in the National Assembly in the 2024 general election.

== Personal life ==
Kwankwa is married and has five children. He won the 2015 Outstanding International Leadership Award for his work against xenophobia. The award has since been renamed after him.
