= Tandeka Gqada =

South African politician and businesswoman

Councillor Tandeka Gqada

Member of the Cape Town City Council
- Incumbent
- Assumed office 9 November 2021
- In office 21 May 2011 – May 2014

Shadow Deputy Minister of Energy
- In office 1 January 2017 – 7 May 2019
- Leader: Mmusi Maimane
- Preceded by: Gordon Mackay
- Succeeded by: Cheryl Phillips

Shadow Deputy Minister of Human Settlements
- In office 5 June 2014 – 1 January 2017
- Leader: Mmusi Maimane
- Preceded by: Petronella Duncan
- Succeeded by: Tarnia Baker

Member of the National Assembly of South Africa
- In office 21 May 2014 – 7 May 2019

Personal details
- Party: Democratic Alliance
- Education: University of South Africa
- Profession: Politician

Tandeka Gqada is a South African businesswoman, politician and a councillor for the Democratic Alliance in the City of Cape Town since November 2021. Gqada had previously served as a DA councillor in the City of Cape Town where she was an Executive Member of the Mayoral Committee. She is a former Member of Parliament for the DA (2014–2019). She served as the Shadow Deputy Minister of Human Settlements from 2014 to 2017 and as the Shadow Deputy Minister of Energy from 2017 to 2019.

== Background ==
Gqada completed a Management Development Programme, a Master of Business Administration (MBA) and a Human Resources Management Programme through the University of South Africa. She then worked for UNISA for nine years, before working for Old Mutual and the Nedbank group. In 2010, Gqada became interested in politics and after meeting Masizole Mnqasela, a DA Member of the Western Cape Provincial Parliament, at the opening of a Nedbank branch where Mnqasela had spoken, Gqada decided to join the Democratic Alliance. She was elected as a DA PR councillor in the City of Cape Town in the 2011 municipal elections as the DA won a majority of seats on the council. Incoming DA mayor Patricia de Lille appointed Gqada as the Executive Mayoral Committee Member for the Community Services Portfolio. Gqada's appointment took effect when De Lille was elected mayor. In February 2013, Gqada was moved to the human settlements portfolio.

== Parliamentary career ==
Gqada stood as a DA parliamentary candidate in the 2014 national elections as a candidate on the DA's national and regional lists. She was elected to the National Assembly and became the DA's shadow deputy minister for human settlements. In November 2016, Gqada was moved to the energy portfolio. Her appointment took effect in January 2017.

In June 2017, Gqada witnessed the fatal shooting of the DA's councillor for Phillipi East, Xolile Gwangxu. In a subsequent Facebook post, Gqada said that the shooting left her traumatised, unable to sleep after seeing Gwangxu fall to the ground.

Gqada stood for re-election in 2019. She was the 134th candidate on the DA's national list and the 39th candidate on the DA's Western Cape list. She lost her seat at the election.

== Post-parliamentary career ==
=== Return to the Cape Town councillor ===
Gqada was high up on the DA's PR candidate list for the City of Cape Town for the municipal elections on 1 November 2021, meaning that she would easily be elected back to the council at the election. She was elected back to council and she was sworn in as a councillor on 9 November 2021.

In March 2022, she accused the deputy chief whip of the DA in the city council Errol Anstey of making racist remarks towards her during a caucus session lunch break. In a leaked e-mail sent to all the DA councillors in the metro, Gqada said that after she asked whether it was lunch time, because she saw that some of her colleagues were going down to the dining hall, Anstey allegedly told her that she needs to go back to the Eastern Cape, because her "food is there". When she confronted Anstey, he told her that his words were meant as a "joke".
