= Gwen Ngwenya =

South African politician

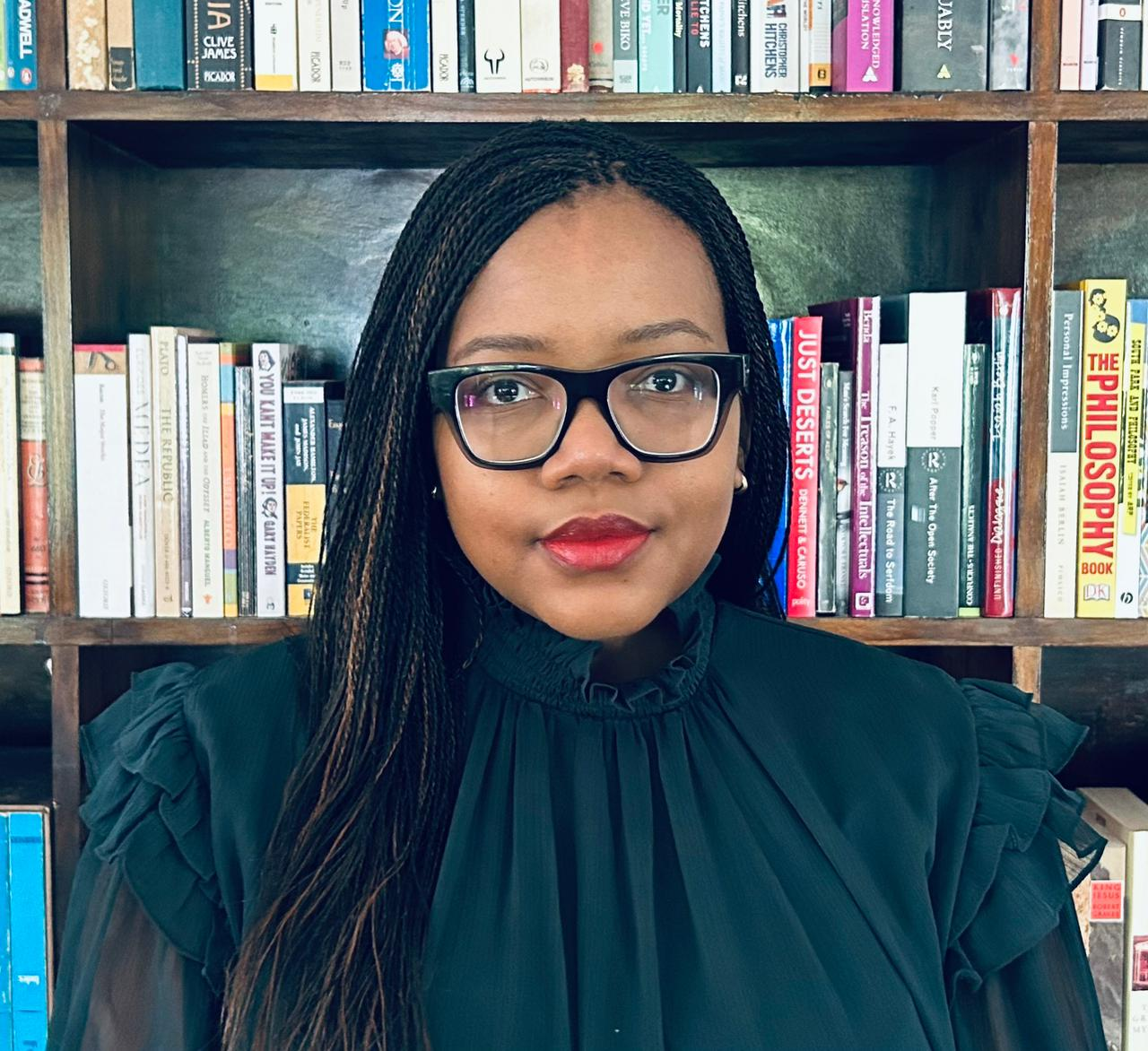

Member of the National Assembly
- In office 27 February 2018 – 7 May 2019

Personal details
- Born: Sinethemba Amanda Ngwenya; 7 September 1989 (age 37) Durban, Natal Province; South Africa
- Party: Democratic Alliance
- Education: St. Mary's Diocesan School for Girls, Kloof
- Alma mater: University of Cape Town; University of Paris XII

Gwen Sinethemba Amanda Ngwenya (born 7 September 1989) is a South African politician and public policy specialist. She was the head of policy for the Democratic Alliance (DA) between 2018 and 2023, excepting a hiatus from January to November 2019. During that time she represented the party in the National Assembly of South Africa from February 2018 to May 2019.

Ngwenya rose to prominence in DA student politics at the University of Cape Town. As president of the student representative council in 2011, she led a productive campaign against the university's prevailing policy of race-based affirmative action in admissions. She was later the chief operating officer of the South African Institute of Race Relations, a liberal think tank, between 2016 and 2018. She left the think tank in February 2018 to enter full-time politics as a parliamentarian and head of policy for the DA.

Her first stint as head of policy lasted less than a year before she fell out with the party leadership and resigned in January 2019. She was regarded as a member of the liberal faction that opposed the DA's ideological direction under Mmusi Maimane. In November 2019, weeks after John Steenhuisen replaced Maimane as DA leader, she was reappointed to her former position. She led the party's policy unit through the September 2020 DA policy conference, which adopted a new assemblage of race-blind policies, including a race-blind affirmative action framework to replace black economic empowerment. She left the DA in March 2023 to become Airbnb's head of policy in the Middle East and Africa.

== Early life and education ==
Ngwenya was born into a Zulu family in Durban on 7 September 1989. Her parents, Thami and Busisiwe, were both teachers in local public schools; her father was a school principal and later a civil servant in the Department of Education, and her mother taught in the township of Umlazi. Ngwenya attended Glenmore Primary School in Umbilo, Durban and then received an academic scholarship to St. Mary's Diocesan School for Girls in Kloof, where she was a competitive debater. She matriculated at St. Mary's with five distinctions in 2007.

After high school Ngwenya was awarded a scholarship to study medicine at the University of Cape Town, although she later transferred to a social science degree. Already self-identified as a liberal, she joined the student wing of the Democratic Alliance (DA), the Democratic Alliance Students' Organisation (DASO). She won election to the student representative council on a DASO ticket, serving as vice-president in 2010 and as president in 2011. In 2010 she was the joint winner of the university's Ackerman Foundation Student Leader Award.

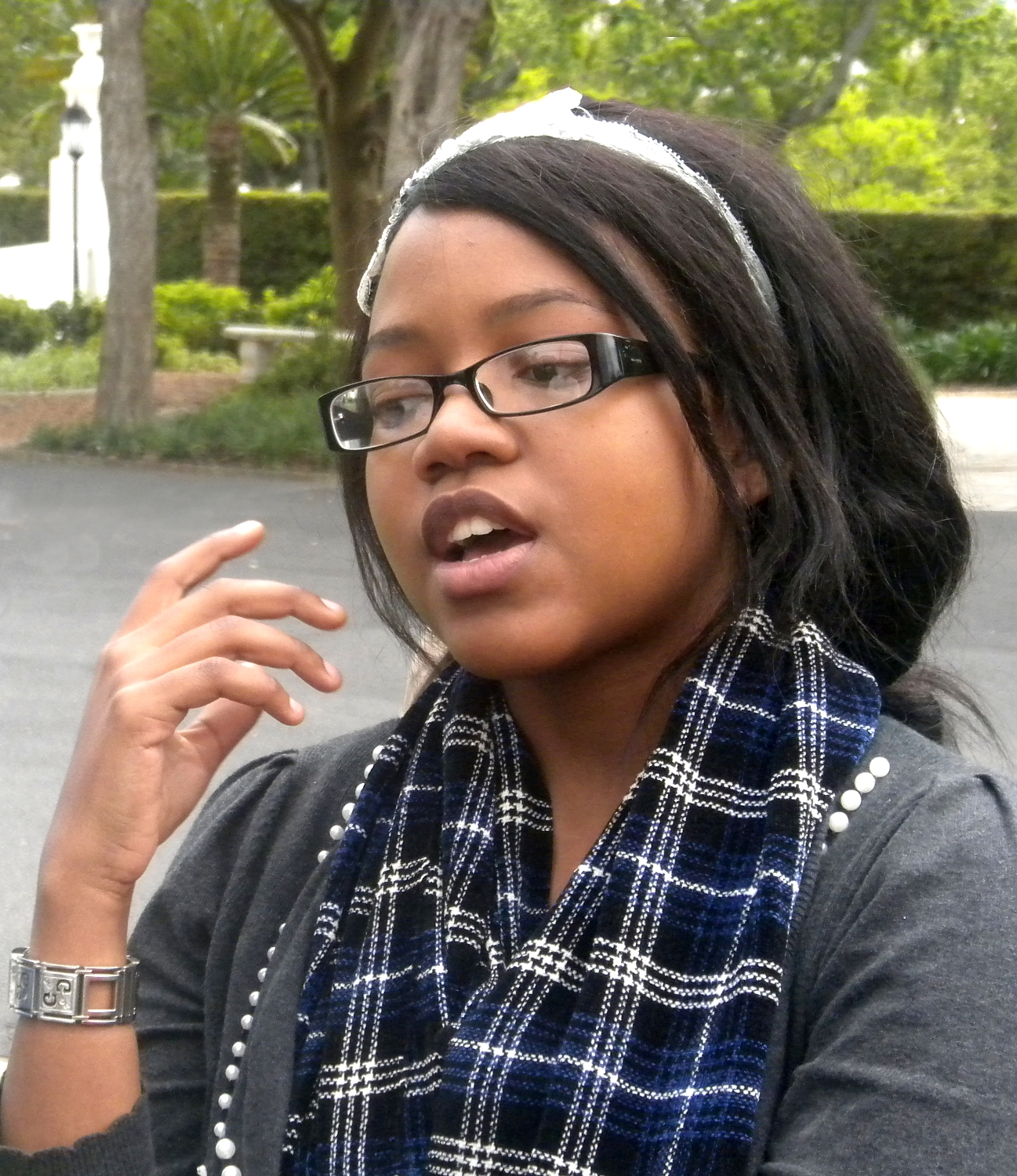
Ngwenya during a DASO meeting with Premier Helen Zille at Leeuwenhof, September 2010

During this period, Ngwenya led DASO's opposition to the University of Cape Town's prevailing policy of affirmative action in admissions, which used race as the sole proxy for disadvantage. She preferred a means-tested admissions policy, believing the prevailing policy to favour "an elite class of beneficiaries" and to relegate black students to a "status of perpetual victim". According to Geordin Hill-Lewis, who was Ngwenya's colleague in DASO, Ngwenya "pretty much single-handedly" drafted an alternative admissions policy that considered socioeconomic measures and that was substantially incorporated into UCT's actual policy. She left the university in 2012 with a bachelor's degree in classical studies and law.

== Early career ==
Interested in a career in politics but dubious of career politicians, Ngwenya emigrated spontaneously after her graduation. She moved to Northern France, where she taught English and worked as an au pair. In 2014 she completed a master's degree in economics at the University of Paris XII, with a thesis about cartelisation in India. During her thesis research, she lived in New Delhi, India, working in competition economics for an American consulting firm called Nathan Associates. Afterwards she worked for Bloomberg, first as an emerging markets analyst in London, England for a year and then for another year as an account manager in Johannesburg, South Africa.

In 2016, Ngwenya became the first chief operating officer of the South African Institute of Race Relations (SAIRR), a liberal think tank then led by Frans Cronje. During her two years at SAIRR, Ngwenya attained some public prominence for her informal political commentary. She also enrolled in a master's degree in finance at the University of London in this period.

In December 2016 she was a vocal proponent of a pending vote of no confidence in the executive leadership of her alma mater; she argued that Max Price, the University of Cape Town's Vice-Chancellor, had made inordinate concessions to "unelected and unrepresentative" student activists in the #FeesMustFall movement. Some of those activists subsequently launched a social media smear campaign against her.

== Democratic Alliance policy unit ==
=== First term: 2018–2019 ===
In late February 2018, Ngwenya left SAIRR to become head of policy for the DA, which was then the official opposition in the Parliament of South Africa. On 27 February 2018 she was sworn in to a DA seat in the National Assembly, filling the casual vacancy that arose from Gordon Mackay's resignation. There were immediately rumours that she would be a candidate for higher office, such as the federal leadership of the DA; Ngwenya said that she felt "that kind of pressure" but that "right now I am focused on policy".

In Parliament, she was an alternate member of the Standing Committee on Finance, an alternate member of the Portfolio Committee on Justice and Correctional Services, and later a member of the Portfolio Committee on Energy. Not yet 30, she was the second-youngest politician in the house, behind Hlomela Bucwa. From August 2018, she was also a member of the council of Stellenbosch University, serving as the nominee of the Premier of the Western Cape.

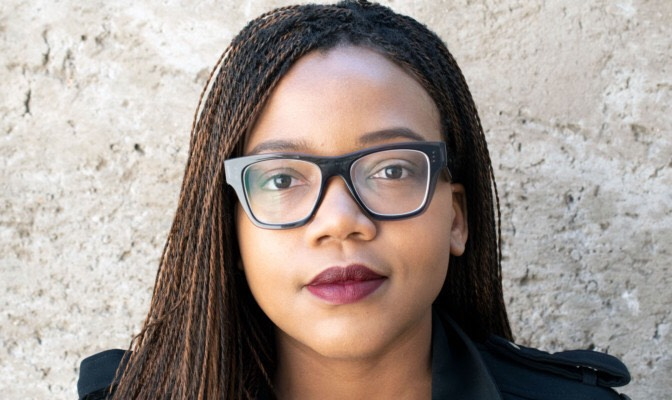
Ngwenya during her tenure as the DA's head of policy

In the DA's policy unit, Ngwenya said upon her entrance that she hoped to distinguish the DA's policy position from that of other political parties and to devise policy solutions that were neither race-based nor "purely redistributional". Carol Paton of the Business Day described her as "super smart, articulate and super conservative". City Press reported that she was given a hostile reception by the progressive or social democratic camp in the party, which saw her function as being to put a "black face" to a conservative policy agenda. Indeed, Ngwenya was consistently regarded as a member of – or even as "the face of" – the DA's "liberal core", a faction that identified with pure or classical liberalism, free-market capitalism, and a race-blind version of non-racialism. Commenting on this narrative, Ngwenya said that her critics were "struggling to put me in a box": "If it's progressive to have a black person as head of policy and regressive to have a right wing member, then maybe having a black person who some view as right wing should cancel everything out."

==== Black economic empowerment ====
Jason Lloyd of the Mail & Guardian argued in 2019 that Mmusi Maimane, the DA's federal leader and the champion of its social democratic faction, had made a "tactical error" in appointing Ngwenya, because she was ideologically opposed to the "race-conscious and transformative political outlook" for which she was tasked with developing a policy platform. In particular, Ngwenya was embroiled in a public spat over broad-based black economic empowerment (BBBEE), a government affirmative action policy which she opposed. At a DA federal executive meeting in July 2018, she presented a policy paper entitled Vula: The open economy, which proposed abandoning BBBEE in favour of an environmental, social and governance index. This proposal became public in August 2018, when Ngwenya announced it as the DA's new position. That announcement was confirmed and endorsed by some DA politicians, including Gavin Davis, but it was disowned by others, including Phumzile van Damme, Nqaba Bhanga, and DA federal council chairperson James Selfe, all of whom disputed it both in fact and in principle.

Ngwenya's policy paper was discussed again at an economic policy commission in September, but it was not adopted in the DA's manifesto in the 2019 general election, which was launched at the end of September. Ngwenya later complained that she had been "hung out to dry" by Maimane and the rest of the party leadership, writing that, "Instead of having the courage of its convictions, at the mere whiff of a debate on BEE the party felt it best to attack the head of policy than to own up to its own structure’s decision."

==== Resignation ====
On 24 January 2019, at the height of the DA's election campaign, Ngwenya announced her resignation as DA head of policy, citing her dissatisfaction with the incumbent leadership's lack of concern for policy. Her resignation letter, dated 18 January and leaked to the press a week later, set out a list of grievances which included insufficient resources in the policy unit and insufficient political support from the party leadership. Some observers suggested that Ngwenya had "jumped before she was pushed", frustrated at having been sidelined in the manifesto development process, while others suggested that her resignation was a power play by her faction and even the opening salvo in a possible attempt to oust Maimane.

The bottom line is that I do not believe the DA takes policy seriously... I have never in any meaningful way been the head of policy; I was given all of the responsibility and none of the basic levers to do the job. In practice all this resignation means is that from today I am no longer available to be the face of policy.

— Ngwenya's leaked letter of resignation as DA head of policy, January 2019

Despite her departure from the policy unit, Ngwenya remained a member and representative of the DA, and she stood for re-election to her parliamentary seat in that year's general election, ranked 23rd on the DA's national party list. However, after she won re-election in May, she announced on Twitter that she would decline her seat and would instead leave Parliament "to work now on issues at the nexus of tech and public policy". She became the chief executive officer of Techpol, a specialised policy and public affairs advisory firm. She also continued her public commentary, in which capacity she was openly critical of Maimane.

=== Second term: 2019–2023 ===
On 23 October 2019, Maimane resigned from the DA leadership after months of criticism over the party's performance in the general election. There was immediate speculation that Ngwenya would return to the party's leadership; the DA's Mike Moriarty suggested that she would fill Maimane's seat in Parliament, and City Press reported that she was a favourite to replace him as DA federal leader, in part because of her popularity with the party's key donors.

A fortnight later, News24 reported that Helen Zille, the DA's newly elected federal council chairperson, had decided unilaterally to reappoint Ngwenya to her former policy position, over the objections of some other senior party members. When John Steenhuisen was elected as interim DA leader on 17 November, he said publicly that he would support Ngwenya's return. Her reappointment as head of policy was formally announced on 24 November 2019.

==== 2020 policy conference ====
Ngwenya led the policy unit through the DA's campaign in the 2021 local elections, and, in advance of the election, its first-ever policy conference, which was held virtually in September 2020 during the COVID-19 pandemic. The policy conference debated three draft policy documents prepared by Ngwenya's office: one on the party's fundamental values and principles, and one each on economic justice and local government. The values and principles document contained a rejection of race and gender as proxies for disadvantage and a concomitant rejection of "race, gender and other quotas". In line with this principle, the economic justice document presented an alternative to BBBEE that would be based on contributions to the sustainable development goals (SDGs) rather than on contributions to black economic empowerment. These policies were adopted by the policy conference, and in March 2022 the DA introduced legislation – nicknamed the Social Impact Bill – to make contribution to the SDGs the new desideratum in preferential procurement.

The success of the policy proposals, which some commentators criticised for "race denialism", was regarded as a sign of the entrenchment of the liberal faction of the DA, spearheaded by Ngwenya and Zille. Ngwenya agreed with journalists that the new economic justice policy was substantially identical to the Vula policy that she had drafted for Maimane's DA, saying that the policy had "been ready for two years" but that until recently "the party would not have the conversation about what the economic policy should be". Asked whether she was concerned about the electoral impact of the new policy platform, she said that there was little evidence that the policies would be unpopular with the electorate, but that in any case, "it's worth losing votes on the basis of principle".

==== Resignation ====
On 26 March 2023, shortly before the DA's next federal congress, Ngwenya announced her resignation from SAIRR to join Airbnb as the company's head of policy in the Middle East and Africa. Mathew Cuthbert replaced her as the DA's head of policy.

== Personal life ==
Ngwenya was Christian until she began "to question God" during her time at St. Mary's, a Roman Catholic school. She was born Sinethemba Amanda Ngwenya and added Gwen to her legal name as an adult.

In February 2020, Daily Maverick editor Ferial Haffajee suggested on Twitter that Gareth van Onselen's impartiality as a political journalist was compromised because Ngwenya was his "partner". Ngwenya did not respond to the claim.
