= Alan Mcloughlin =

South African politician

Alan Ross Mcloughlin is a South African politician from the Democratic Alliance. He was a member of the Parliament of South Africa from 2014 to 2019.

== See also ==
- List of National Assembly members of the 26th Parliament of South Africa
