= Yoliswa Yako =

South African politician (born 1983)

Yoliswa Yako MP
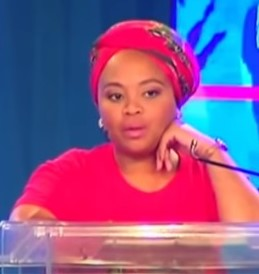

Member of the National Assembly of South Africa
- In office 3 September 2018 – 10 July 2024

Personal details
- Born: Yoliswa Nomampondomise Yako; 22 March 1983 (age 43)
- Party: Economic Freedom Fighters
- Occupation: Member of Parliament
- Profession: Politician

Yoliswa Nomampondomise Yako (born 22 March 1983) is a South African politician from the Eastern Cape who served as a Member of the National Assembly of South Africa. She took office as an MP on 3 September 2018. Before that, Yako was a PR councillor of the Nelson Mandela Bay Metropolitan Municipality and the chairperson of the municipality's Municipal Public Accounts Committee (MPAC). Yako is a member of the Economic Freedom Fighters.

== Background ==
Yako was born on 22 March 1983. She joined the Economic Freedom Fighters in 2014 and was elected as a councillor of the Nelson Mandela Bay Metropolitan Municipality in August 2016. In 2018, she was elected chairperson of the municipality's Municipal Public Accounts Committee (MPAC).

== Parliamentary career ==
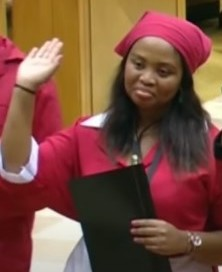
Yako being sworn in on 22 May 2019

On 3 September 2018, Yako was sworn in as a Member of the National Assembly of South Africa for the EFF, succeeding Vuyokazi Ketabahle. Nosipho Ncana replaced her as a Nelson Mandela Bay councillor. Yako was assigned to the Portfolio Committee on Mineral Resources. She delivered her maiden speech on the #FeesMustFall activists, who were either imprisoned or expelled from university.

Yako was elected to a full term as an MP in May 2019. On 27 June 2019, she received her new committee assignments. Yako was ranked too low on the EFF national list to be returned to parliament following the 2024 general election. However, multiple prospective EFF MPs declined their seats in the National Assembly which led to Yako returning to Parliament. She later resigned in July 2024.

She is openly queer.

=== Committee assignments ===
- Portfolio Committee on Trade and Industry
- Portfolio Committee on Basic Education (Alternate Member)
- Portfolio Committee on Mineral Resources
