= Agnes Tuck =

South African Politician

Parliament of South Africa

Personal details
- Citizenship: South Africa
- Party: African National Congress (ANC)
- Occupation: Politician

Agnes Tuck is a South African politician who is a member of African National Congress (ANC) political party and the former member of South Africa National Assembly.

== Career ==
Tuck was a member of Parliament/National Assembly of South Africa from 30 March 2015 until 7 May 2019 through ANC party.

As a member of ANC she has been serving this political party for 21 years when she started volunteering in 1982 and she worked in ANC's underground structures. She also held the position of Branch Chairperson and ANCWL deputy chairperson in Namakwa region.
