= Nhlanhlakayise Khubisa =

South African politician

Member of the National Assembly of South Africa
- In office 21 May 2014 – 7 May 2019

Personal details
- Born: Nhlanhlakayise Moses Khubisa
- Party: African National Congress
- Other political affiliations: National Freedom Party
- Profession: Politician

Nhlanhlakayise Moses Khubisa is a South African politician who served as a Member of the National Assembly between May 2014 and May 2019. He was a member of the National Freedom Party and served as the party's secretary-general. Khubisa joined the African National Congress right before the 2019 elections.

== Political career ==
Khubisa was a member of the National Freedom Party and the party's secretary-general. After the 2014 general election, he was sworn in as a Member of the National Assembly of South Africa for the party. He was the chief whip of the party's caucus. During his time in parliament, he was a member of the following committees: Cooperative Governance and Traditional Affairs, Higher Education and Training, and Science and Technology.

On 4 May 2019, Khubisa was welcomed into the African National Congress by party president Cyril Ramaphosa. He left parliament on 7 May, as the parliamentary term expired.
