= Daphne Rantho =

South African politician and educator

Member of the National Assembly of South Africa
- In office 21 May 2014 – 7 May 2019
- Constituency: Eastern Cape

Permanent Delegate to the National Council of Provinces from the Eastern Cape
- In office 7 May 2009 – 6 May 2014

Personal details
- Born: Daphne Zukiswa Kulas Jansenville, South Africa
- Party: African National Congress
- Profession: Educator; Politician

Daphne Zukiswa Rantho (née Kulas) is a South African politician and educator who served as a Member of the National Assembly of South Africa for the African National Congress from 2014 to 2019. Prior to serving in the National Assembly, Rantho was a Permanent Delegate to the National Council of Provinces from 2009 to 2014.

== Background ==
Rantho was born in Jansenville in the present-day Eastern Cape. Her political career began in 1976 while she was still a student. She matriculated from the Nathaniel Pamla High School in the Ciskei bantustan. She joined the African National Congress Youth League as a member of the Jansenville Youth (JAYCO). She served on the education desk of the youth league. Rantho completed a teaching diploma in the 1980s and joined the African National Congress Women's League after she married. She worked as a teacher and was a shop steward for the South African Democratic Teachers Union.

== Parliamentary career ==
Rantho joined Parliament following the 2009 general elections as permanent delegate to the National Council of Provinces, the upper house of parliament, from the Eastern Cape. After serving one term in the NCOP, she was elected to the National Assembly, the lower house of parliament, in the 2014 general elections. She was appointed whip of the Portfolio Committee on Public Enterprises by the ANC.

In October 2017, Rantho was appointed to chair the committee's inquiry into allegations of corruption at Eskom. The following month, she indicated her intention to step down as chair following acts of intimidation against her family members. Rantho continued as chair and the inquiry's report was adopted by the National Assembly in November 2018. Opposition parties praised Rantho's work as chairperson.

Prior to the 2019 general elections, Rantho was not included on any ANC candidate lists and left parliament at the election as a result.

On 2 February 2021, Rantho testified at the Zondo Commission. Rantho said in her testimony that a number of ANC MPs did not want the parliamentary inquiry into Eskom in 2017 and 2018 to happen due to concerns it would embarrass the ANC by implicating some of its members and that she was intimidated while she chaired the inquiry.
