= Carin Visser =

South African politician

Carin Visser MP

Permanent delegate to the National Council of Provinces from the North West
- Incumbent
- Assumed office 23 May 2019

Member of the North West Provincial Legislature
- In office 23 August 2018 – 7 May 2019

Member of the National Assembly of South Africa
- In office 1 December 2017 – 16 August 2018

Personal details
- Born: Carin Visser
- Party: Democratic Alliance
- Occupation: Member of Parliament
- Profession: Politician

Carin Visser is a South African politician. Since 2019 she has been serving as a permanent delegate to the National Council of Provinces. She is a member of the North West provincial delegation. She was a Member of the National Assembly of South Africa from 2017 to 2018 and a Member of the North West Provincial Legislature from 2018 to 2019. She was also a municipal councillor of the Tswaing Local Municipality. Visser served the provincial chairperson of the Democratic Alliance (DA) from 2015 to 2020.

== Political career ==
Visser got involved with the local politics of Sannieshof as the chairperson of the town's ratepayer association. She joined the DA and was elected a PR councillor of the Tswaing Local Municipality in the 2011 municipal election. She served as the party's caucus leader in council. She was elected provincial chairperson of the DA in 2015 and was re-elected as a councillor in 2016.

In 2017, the DA redeployed her to be a representative of the party in the National Assembly. She took office as an MP on 1 December. The following year, Visser was appointed to the North West Provincial Legislature, filling the vacancy created by the resignation of Joe McGluwa. She was sworn in as an MPL on 23 August 2018. Visser was elected the party's caucus leader in the legislature.

After the 2019 election, she moved from the legislature to the National Council of Provinces representing the North West. She is the sole DA representative in the provincial delegation.

In 2020, she stood down as DA provincial chairperson. Rustenburg DA councillor, Luan Snyders, was elected to succeed her.
