= Mmabatho Mokause =

South African politician

Mmabatho Mokause MP

Permanent delegate to the National Council of Provinces from the Northern Cape
- In office 11 March 2020 – May 2024

Member of the National Assembly of South Africa
- In office 22 May 2019 – 9 September 2019
- In office 21 April 2015 – 1 January 2018

Member of the Northern Cape Provincial Legislature
- In office 21 May 2014 – April 2015

Personal details
- Born: Mmabatho Olive Mokause Kuruman, Cape Province, South Africa
- Party: Economic Freedom Fighters
- Occupation: Member of Parliament
- Profession: Politician

Mmabatho Olive Mokause is a South African politician serving as a permanent delegate to the National Council of Provinces from the Northern Cape since March 2020. She is a member of the Economic Freedom Fighters (EFF). Mokause was a Member of the Northern Cape Provincial Legislature from May 2014 to April 2015. She was appointed to the National Assembly of South Africa, the lower house of Parliament, in April 2015 and served in the chamber until January 2018. After the May 2019 general election, she returned to the National Assembly, but resigned in September. In March 2020, she was selected to represent the EFF in the upper house.

== Life and career ==
Mokause is a resident of Kuruman in the Northern Cape.

Mokause has been a party member of the Economic Freedom Fighters since its inception and was appointed to serve on the inaugural Central Command Team, the party's highest decision-making body. She was elected to the Northern Cape Provincial Legislature in the general election held on 7 May 2014 as one of two party representatives and took office as a Member of the Provincial Legislature (MPL) on 21 May 2014.

In November 2014, Mokause was assaulted while attending the EFF provincial conference in the Northern Cape.

In April 2015, she resigned as an MPL as she was set to be deployed to Parliament. She was sworn in as a Member of the National Assembly on 21 April 2015. In October 2017, the Diamond Fields Advertiser reported that the EFF central command had instructed Mokause to "resign immediately" from Parliament. Her resignation came into effect on 1 January 2018.

However, Mokause returned to the National Assembly following the May 2019 general election. She served as an MP for less than four months before resigning on 9 September. At the party's national elective conference in December 2019, she was re-elected as a member of the Central Command Team. She was sworn in as a Member of the National Council of Provinces, the upper house, in March 2020 and filled the seat left vacant by the resignation of Poppy Koni. After the 2024 national elections Mmabatho was not deployed to parliament and later resigned as an eff member as she was not happy with the eff deployment structures.
