= Timothy Khoza =

South African politician (d. 2017)

Member of the National Assembly of South Africa
- In office 26 May 2014 – 2 August 2017
- Preceded by: Marthinus van Schalkwyk
- Succeeded by: Alina Mfulo

Personal details
- Died: 2 August 2017 Paarl, Western Cape, South Africa
- Party: African National Congress

Timothy Zanoxolo Matsebane Khoza (died 2 August 2017) was a South African politician who served as a Member of the National Assembly of South Africa from May 2014 until his death in August 2017. He was a member of the African National Congress.

== Parliamentary career ==
A member of the African National Congress from Mpumalanga, Khoza stood for election to the National Assembly of South Africa in the 2014 general election, ranked 123rd on the ANC's list. Khoza was not elected to a seat in Parliament at the election, however, he entered the National Assembly shortly afterwards on 26 May 2014 as a replacement for Marthinus van Schalkwyk. In June 2014, he became a member of the Portfolio Committee on Basic Education. The following year, he was appointed to serve on the Portfolio Committee on Small Business Development as well.

== Death ==
On 2 August 2017, Khoza and other members of the portfolio committee on basic education were conducting oversight visits at schools in the Cape Winelands area until the vehicle they were travelling in collided with a minibus taxi and overturned on the R301 between Paarl and Franschhoek. Khoza was fatally injured, while three other MPs sustained serious injuries. President Jacob Zuma extended condolences to Khoza's family. A memorial service was held for him at Mbambiso High School in Boschfontein on 10 August 2017; his funeral was held two days later.

== See also ==
- List of members of the National Assembly of South Africa who died in office
