= Rachel Adams =

South African politician (born 1963)

Rachel Adams MP

Member of the National Assembly of South Africa
- Incumbent
- Assumed office May 2017
- Constituency: Northern Cape

Personal details
- Born: Rachel Cecilia Adams; August 9, 1963 (age 62)
- Party: African National Congress
- Profession: Politician

Rachel Cecilia Adams (born 9 August 1963) is a South African politician from the African National Congress. She has been a member of the National Assembly of South Africa since May 2017, representing the Northern Cape. She serves as a member of the Portfolio Committee on Land Reform and Rural Development and the Portfolio Committee on Women, Youth and Persons with Disabilities. A 2023 report by the National Assembly's ethics committee listed Adams as one of the members of parliament who had not received any gifts or hospitality payments from outside sources.

In the 2024 South African general election, she was 44th on the ANC party list. She was re-elected to Parliament for a second full term.
