= Omphile Maotwe =

South African politician

Omphile Maotwe MP
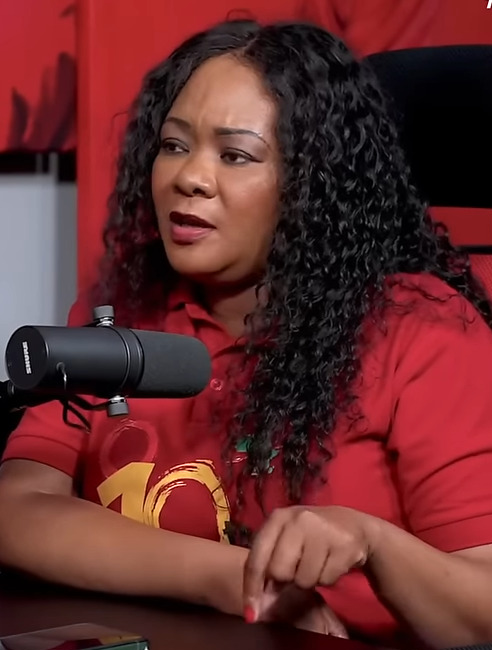
- Maotwe in November 2024

Treasurer-General of the Economic Freedom Fighters
- Incumbent
- Assumed office 14 December 2019
- President: Julius Malema
- Preceded by: Leigh-Ann Mathys

Member of the National Assembly of South Africa
- Incumbent
- Assumed office 31 October 2019

Personal details
- Born: Omphile Mankoba Confidence Maotwe
- Party: Economic Freedom Fighters
- Occupation: Member of Parliament
- Profession: Politician

Omphile Mankoba Confidence Maotwe is a South African politician. On 14 December 2019, she was elected Treasurer-General of the Economic Freedom Fighters, succeeding Leigh-Ann Mathys. Maotwe became a Member of Parliament on 31 October 2019. She was previously involved with the EFF in Gauteng, serving as the party's spokeswoman and treasurer.
