= Annerie Weber =

South African politician (born 1967)

Annerie Weber MPL

Member of the Mpumalanga Provincial Legislature
- Incumbent
- Assumed office 14 June 2024

Member of the National Assembly of South Africa
- In office 22 May 2019 – 28 May 2024

Chairperson of the DA caucus in the Nkangala District Municipality
- In office 2015–2019

Personal details
- Born: 2 July 1967 (age 59)
- Party: Democratic Alliance
- Education: North-West University; University of South Africa
- Occupation: Member of Parliament
- Profession: Politician

Annerie Maria Magdalena Weber (born 2 July 1967) is a South African politician who serves as a member of the Mpumalanga Provincial Legislature. A member of the Democratic Alliance, she served as a Member of the National Assembly of South Africa from 2019 until 2024. Weber served as the chairperson of the DA's caucus in the Nkangala District Municipality between 2015 and 2019.

== Education ==
Weber obtained a BMus and a BA Honours in Psychology from the North-West University. She earned a diploma in industrial relations from the university's Vaal Triangle Campus. From the University of South Africa, she holds a higher education diploma. Weber achieved a monitoring and evaluation certificate from the National School of Governance.

== Politics ==
Weber served as the provincial director of the Democratic Alliance in Mpumalanga from 2012 to 2014. From 2015 to 2019, she was the chairperson of the party's caucus in the Nkangala District Municipality.

In March 2018, she was elected as the provincial chairperson of the Democratic Alliance's Women Network.

After the general election that was held on 8 May 2019, Weber was selected to represent the DA in parliament. She was sworn in as a Member of the National Assembly on 22 May 2019. On 27 June 2019, she received her committee assignment. On 21 April 2023, Weber was appointed Shadow Deputy Minister of Forestry, Fisheries and the Environment.

Weber was elected to the Mpumalanga Provincial Legislature in the 2024 general election.
