= Martha Mmola =

South African politician (died 2020)

Permanent delegate to the National Council of Provinces from Mpumalanga
- In office 23 May 2019 – 18 July 2020

Member of the National Assembly of South Africa
- In office 21 May 2014 – 7 May 2019
- Preceded by: Tito Mboweni

Personal details
- Born: Martha Phindile Mmola
- Died: 18 July 2020
- Political party: African National Congress

Martha Phindile Mmola (died 18 July 2020) was a South African politician who served as a permanent delegate to the National Council of Provinces from 2019 to her death in 2020. Prior to her tenure in the National Council of Provinces she served in the National Assembly of South Africa from 2014 to 2019.

== Career ==
From 1998 to 1999 and 2000 to 2001, Mmola served as a branch secretary for the African National Congress in Ward 19 in the Govan Mbeki Local Municipality, and as a branch chairperson from 1999 to 2000.

=== National Assembly of South Africa ===
In 2014, Mmola was elected to the National Assembly of South Africa to replace Tito Mboweni as a member of the African National Congress.

From 20 June 2014 to 7 May 2019, she served as a member of the Portfolio Committee on Police.

=== National Council of Provinces ===
In 2019, Mmola was elected as a permanent delegate to the National Council of Provinces from the Mpumalanga province. On June 24, 2019, she was given her committee assignments.

==== Committee membership ====
- Joint Standing Committee on Defence
- Select Committee on Petitions and Executive Undertakings
- Select Committee on Finance
- Select Committee on Appropriations
- Select Committee on Cooperative Governance and Traditional Affairs, Water and Sanitation and Human Settlements
- Select Committee on Security and Justice

== Personal life ==
On 18 July 2020, Mmola died from illness associated to COVID-19 during the COVID-19 pandemic in South Africa.
