= Christian Msimang =

South African politician

Member of the National Assembly of South Africa
- In office 22 May 2019 – 28 May 2024
- In office 23 August 2014 – 1 November 2017
- In office 6 May 2009 – 6 May 2014

Personal details
- Born: Christian Themba Msimang
- Party: Inkatha Freedom Party
- Occupation: Member of Parliament
- Profession: Politician

Christian Themba Msimang is a South African politician who served as a Member of the National Assembly from May 2009 until May 2014, from August 2014 to November 2017 and again from May 2019 to May 2024. Msimang is a member of the Inkatha Freedom Party.

== Career ==
Msimang served as the deputy secretary-general of the Inkatha Freedom Party during the early-2000s.

== Parliamentary career ==
Msimang was nominated to the National Assembly in the aftermath of the 2009 general election and was sworn in as a Member of Parliament on 6 May 2009.

He was placed low on the party's candidate list for the 2014 general election. As a consequence, he did not return to Parliament after the election. MP Mario Oriani-Ambrosini died on 16 August 2014 and the party appointed Msimang as his successor. He was sworn in on 23 August and later retired as an MP on 1 November 2017.

He returned to Parliament following the 2019 general election. He was not placed on any IFP candidate list for the 2024 general election and left parliament as a result.

=== Committee memberships ===
- Joint Constitutional Review Committee
- Portfolio Committee on Justice and Correctional Services
- Portfolio Committee on Small Business Development
- Committee for Section 194 Enquiry (Alternate)
