= Matthews Wolmarans =

South African politician

Member of the National Assembly of South Africa
- In office 19 June 2019 – 28 May 2024
- Preceded by: Mildred Oliphant
- Constituency: National List
- In office 21 September 2017 – 7 May 2019
- Preceded by: Brian Molefe
- Constituency: North West

Personal details
- Born: Matthews Johannes Wolmarans; 1968 or 1969 (age 56–57)
- Party: African National Congress
- Children: 2
- Profession: Politician

Matthews Johannes Wolmarans (born 1968 or 1969) is a South African politician who served as a Member of the National Assembly of South Africa from 2017 until 2019 and again from 2019 until 2024 as a member of the African National Congress. Wolmarans is also a former mayor of the Rustenburg Local Municipality.

== Career ==
Wolmarans is a member of the African National Congress. He served as the mayor of the Rustenburg Local Municipality. He served on the provincial executive committee on the ANC in the North West.

== Murder conviction and subsequent acquittal ==
In July 2012, Wolmarans, the then-speaker of the municipality, and his former bodyguard, Enoch Matshaba, were found guilty of the murder of Moss Phakoe, a corruption and fraud whistle-blower and ANC councillor in the Rustenburg Local Municipality. Phakoe was shot dead in his driveway outside his home in Rustenburg on 14 March 2009, two days after he had handed over a dossier detailing fraud and corruption allegations in the municipality to former co-operative governance and traditional affairs minister Sicelo Shiceka. He also allegedly gave the dossier to senior ANC officials. Wolmarans was sentenced to twenty years in prison, while Matshaba was sentenced to life in prison.

He was jailed at the Rooigrond Prison in Mahikeng, the provincial capital of the North West province. In September 2012, the Mail & Guardian newspaper revealed that Wolmarans was still receiving a salary from the Rustenburg municipality, despite being imprisoned. The national executive committee of the ANC had instructed that his party membership be terminated to remove him as a councillor, however, the provincial executive committee did not act on the instruction.

In June 2014, the Supreme Court of Appeal set aside the conviction of him and Matshaba, because a witness changed his evidence. Wolmarans soon after announced that he would be suing the state and seven police officers for wrongfully arresting him and charging him with Phakoe's murder.

== Parliamentary career ==
In August 2017, the North West ANC structure announced that it would be sending Wolmarans to the National Assembly of South Africa to fill the vacancy that was created by the resignation of former Eskom CEO, Brian Molefe. The decision was criticised by other ANC members. Wolmarans was sworn into office on 21 September 2017 by deputy speaker Lechesa Tsenoli. For the remainder of the term, Wolmarans sat on the Portfolio Committee on Human Settlements and the Portfolio Committee on Higher Education and Training. He was not placed high enough on the ANC's national candidate list for the general election on May 8, 2019 and as a consequence of this, he did not return to parliament immediately after the election.

Former Labour minister and ANC MP Mildred Oliphant resigned her seat in the National Assembly in June 2019 after she was not reappointed to the cabinet. The ANC chose Wolmarans to fill her seat and he was sworn in as a Member of the National Assembly on 19 June. On 27 June 2019, he was appointed to sit on the Portfolio Committee on Mineral Resources and Energy and the Portfolio Committee on Employment and Labour.

Wolmarans stood for re-election in 2024 but was ranked too low to secure reelection.

== Personal life ==
Wolmarans' wife was diagnosed with cancer during his murder trial. He has two children.
