= Thandeka Mbabama =

South African politician

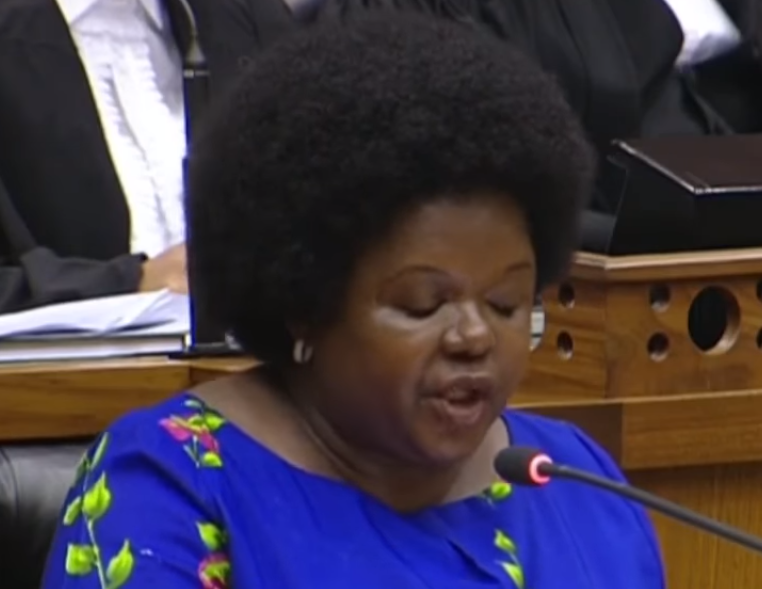

Shadow Deputy Minister of Agriculture, Land Reform and Rural Development
- In office 5 June 2019 – 14 June 2024
- Leader: Mmusi Maimane; John Steenhuisen
- Preceded by: Position established
- Succeeded by: Position vacant

Shadow Deputy Minister of Rural Development and Land Reform
- In office 1 January 2017 – 5 June 2019
- Leader: Mmusi Maimane
- Preceded by: Tsepo Mhlongo
- Succeeded by: Position abolished

Member of the National Assembly of South Africa
- In office 8 November 2016 – 28 May 2024

Personal details
- Born: 12 September 1956 (age 69)
- Party: Democratic Alliance
- Profession: Politician

Thandeka Moloko Mbabama (born 12 September 1956) is a South African politician of the Democratic Alliance who served as a Member of the National Assembly of South Africa from November 2016 until May 2024. Within the DA's Shadow Cabinet, she was Shadow Deputy Minister of Rural Development and Land Reform from January 2017 until June 2019 and Shadow Deputy Minister of Agriculture, Land Reform and Rural Development between June 2019 and May 2024.

== Career ==
Mbabama is a member of the Democratic Alliance. In 2016, she was elected to the National Assembly of South Africa to replace Nqaba Bhanga. She was sworn into office on 8 November 2016. On 24 November 2016, DA parliamentary leader Mmusi Maimane appointed her to the post of Shadow Deputy Minister of Rural Development and Land Reform. Mbabama became a member of the Portfolio Committee on Rural Development and Land Reform on 8 December 2016. Her appointment as Shadow Deputy Minister took effect on 1 January 2017. Mbabama was appointed to the Constitutional Review Committee in May 2018. In February 2019, she became a member of the Ad Hoc Committee to Amend Section 25 of the Constitution.

Mbabama returned to Parliament following the general election in May 2019. In June 2019, she was appointed Shadow Deputy Minister of Agriculture, Land Reform and Rural Development. In October 2019, she returned to the Ad Hoc committee to amend section 25 of the constitution as a non-voting member. On 5 December 2020, Mbabama was re-appointed to her shadow cabinet role by the newly elected DA leader, John Steenhuisen.

Mbabama did not return to Parliament following the 2024 general election.

=== Views ===
Mbabama has been critical of expropriation without compensation. In March 2018, she voted against the motion. In May 2018, she blamed the ruling African National Congress for failed land reform programmes. Mbabama said in December 2018 that the ANC was using the new Land Expropriation Bill as an "electioneering tool".
