= Julie Kilian =

South African politician

Member of the National Assembly of South Africa
- In office 6 May 2009 – 7 May 2019
- Constituency: Gauteng

Personal details
- Party: African National Congress (2014–present)
- Other party: Congress of the People (2008–14); New National Party
- Spouse: Johan Kilian (deceased)
- Profession: Politician

Juliana Danielle "Julie" Kilian is a South African politician. She served as a Member of the National Assembly of South Africa for two political parties from 2009 until 2019. She represented the Congress of the People from 2009 to 2014 and the African National Congress between 2014 and 2019. Kilian was a senior member of the New National Party.

== Life and career ==
Kilian was born in South Africa. She married Johan Kilian.

In 1974, Kilian became a Liaison Officer for the Department of Information. She and her husband were both senior members of the New National Party. He was the provincial leader of the party in Gauteng while she represented the NNP in the Gauteng Provincial Legislature and served as the chairperson of the legislature's education committee.

In 2008, Kilian and her husband joined the Congress of the People. She was elected to the National Assembly as one of the party's first representatives. She was a member of the portfolio committee on communications.

Prior to the 2014 South African general election, Kilian resigned from COPE and joined the African National Congress. She was one of many parliamentarians who left COPE due to infighting. Her named placed on the ANC's election list and she returned to Parliament following the election. Her husband died in 2015.

In 2018, Kilian criticised AfriForum. She said that the lobby group does not "speak on behalf of myself and other progressive Afrikaans speakers".

Kilian left Parliament before the 2019 general election, as she was not listed as a candidate.
