= Cynthia Majeke =

South African politician

Member of the National Assembly of South Africa
- In office 21 May 2014 – 7 May 2019

Personal details
- Party: United Democratic Movement

Cynthia Nocollege Majeke is a South African politician affiliated with the United Democratic Movement party. Between 2014 and 2019, Majeke served as a Member of Parliament in the National Assembly.

== Parliamentary career ==
A member of the United Democratic Movement, Majeke stood as a candidate in the general election on 7 May 2014. She was third on her party's regional-to-national list. She was not elected to the National Assembly at first, however, Lennox Gaehler opted against serving in the National Assembly to go to the National Council of Provinces. The UDM subsequently chose Majeke.

=== Tenure ===
Majeke's term as an MP began on 21 May 2014.

In August 2017, she and other MPs on the Portfolio Committee on Basic Education were involved in a car accident outside Paarl in the Western Cape. Minister of Basic Education, Angie Motshekga, visited her in hospital.

Majeke left parliament on 7 May 2019.

=== Committee assignments ===
On 20 June 2014, committees were established, and she received her assignments. Her committee memberships were as follows:

- Portfolio Committee on Basic Education
- Portfolio Committee on Health
- Portfolio Committee on Human Settlements
- Portfolio Committee on Women in the Presidency
- Committee on Multi-party Women's Caucus
