= Simanga Mbuyane =

South African politician

Simanga Mbuyane MP

Member of the National Assembly of South Africa
- In office 4 May 2017 – 28 May 2024
- Preceded by: Ngoako Ramatlhodi
- Constituency: Mpumalanga (2019–present); National List (2017–2019)

Personal details
- Born: Simanga Happy Mbuyane
- Party: African National Congress
- Occupation: Member of Parliament
- Profession: Politician

Simanga Happy Mbuyane is a South African politician who served as a member of the National Assembly of South Africa from 2017 until 2024, representing the African National Congress.

== Parliamentary career ==
Mbuyane had stood unsuccessfully for Parliament in 2014 as the 139th candidate on the ANC's national list. On 4 May 2017, Mbuyane was sworn in as a member of the National Assembly. He replaced former minister Ngoako Ramatlhodi who had resigned as a Member of Parliament after he was axed in an unexpected cabinet reshuffle in March 2017.

Mbuyane stood as an ANC parliamentary candidate in Mpumalanga in the 2019 national election and was elected back to Parliament at the election. He is a member of the Portfolio Committee on Trade and Industry.

In October 2020, Mbuyane unsuccessfully attempted to exclude the public from attending a virtual committee meeting of the Portfolio Committee on Trade and Industry to discuss the appointment process of a new National Lotteries Commission (NLC) chairperson. Mbuyane said that the committee had agreed to hold the meeting in private but it was then pointed out to him that portfolio committee meetings are public by default.

Mbuyane did not stand for reelection in 2024.
