= Nhlanhla Xaba =

South African politician

Member of the National Assembly of South Africa
- In office 18 April 2022 – 28 May 2024

Personal details
- Born: Nhlanhla Vincent Xaba
- Party: African National Congress
- Profession: Politician

Nhlanhla Vincent Xaba is a South African politician who served as a member of the National Assembly of South Africa for the African National Congress from April 2022 until May 2024. He was a member of the Portfolio Committee on Health.
