= Moses Tseli =

South African politician

Rembuluwani Tseli

Member of the National Assembly of South Africa
- In office 6 May 2014 – 7 May 2019
- Constituency: Limpopo

Personal details
- Party: African National Congress
- Spouse: Shonisani Tseli (died 2020)
- Children: 3
- Profession: Politician

Rembuluwani Moses Tseli is a South African politician who served as a Member of the National Assembly of South Africa from 2014 until 2019, representing the African National Congress. Tseli had previously been the chief whip of the Makhado Local Municipality.

== Career ==
Tseli worked as a manager responsible for special programmes of the Department of Economic Development, Environment and Tourism. He is a former chairperson of the National Education, Health and Allied Workers Union (Nehawu) in Limpopo. Tseli was also the regional secretary of an ANC region in the province. In 2004, Tseli was employed as a spokesperson of the then-MEC for Economic Development Collins Chabane. Before his election to parliament, he was chief whip of the Makhado Local Municipality.

== Parliamentary career ==
Tseli was elected to an ANC seat in the National Assembly of South Africa in the 2014 general election. Having entered parliament, he became a member of the Portfolio Committee on Communications and Digital Technologies and the Portfolio Committee on Public Enterprises.

In February 2018, Tseli in his capacity as acting chairperson of the communications committee, called for more public participation as the committee was processing the Films and Publications Amendment Bill. In November of the same year, Tseli said that he was not in favour of any retrenchments at the SABC. He supported the removal of Independent Communications Authority of South Africa (Icasa) chairperson Rubben Mohlaloga from his position in March 2019.

Tseli left parliament after the 2019 general election, having not been an ANC parliamentary candidate.

== Personal life ==
Tseli was married to Shonisani Tseli. She died after a short illness in March 2020. They had three children together. On January 30, 2026, he married his partner, Tambudzani Valencia Mudau, in a wedding attended by Limpopo's first lady, Dr. Phophi Ramathuba.
