= Vuyokazi Ketabahle =

South African politician (died 2023)

Member of the National Assembly of South Africa
- In office 21 January 2015 – 31 August 2018
- Preceded by: Magdelene Moonsamy
- Succeeded by: Yoliswa Yako

Personal details
- Born: 1973 or 1974 Idutywa, Cape Province, South Africa
- Died: January 21, 2023 (aged 49) Butterworth Hospital, Butterworth, Eastern Cape, South Africa
- Party: African National Congress (until 2012; from 2018)
- Other political affiliations: Economic Freedom Fighters (2013–2018)
- Profession: Politician

Vuyokazi Ketabahle (1973/1974 – 21 January 2023) was a South African politician who served as a Member of the National Assembly of South Africa for the Economic Freedom Fighters party from January 2015 until August 2018 when she resigned from the party.

== Early life ==
Ketabhle's hometown was Dutywa in the Eastern Cape. She matriculated from JS Skenjane High School.

== Political career ==
Ketabahle started her political career in the Mbhashe Local Municipality, where she became a member of the African National Congress Youth League. Ketabahle resigned from the ANC Youth League after the league's former president Julius Malema was expelled in 2012. She was one of the founding members of Malema's Economic Freedom Fighters (EFF) party in 2013; she was then appointed a commissar for home affairs and worked in the Eastern Cape legislature's administration. At the EFF's National People's Assembly in December 2014, she was elected to the party's highest decision-making body, the Central Command Team.

== Parliamentary career ==
On 21 January 2015, Ketabahle was sworn in as an EFF Member of the National Assembly, replacing Magdelene Moonsamy. During her tenure in parliament, she was an alternate member of the Portfolio Committee on Tourism and a member of the Portfolio Committee on Telecommunications and Postal Services. She also briefly served on the Portfolio Committee on Social Development.

Ketabahle resigned from Parliament and the EFF on 31 August 2018 and rejoined her local ANC branch in the Mbhashe municipality. Nelson Mandela Bay EFF councillor Yoliswa Yako took up her seat in the National Assembly.

== Death ==
Ketabahle died following a stroke on 21 January 2023, at the age of 49.
