= Sibongile Tsoleli =

South African politician

Councillor Sibongile Tsoleli

Member of the National Assembly of South Africa
- In office 21 May 2014 – 7 May 2019

Member of the Free State Provincial Legislature
- In office 2008–2014

Personal details
- Born: Sterkspruit, Cape Province, South Africa
- Party: African National Congress
- Education: Bensonvale College of Education; University of the Free State; University of the Witwatersrand
- Occupation: Politician

Sibongile Pearm Tsoleli is a South African politician currently serving as an African National Congress councillor in the Mangaung Metropolitan Municipality. She also serves in the Mayoral Committee of acting Mangaung mayor Gregory Nthatisi as the Member of the Mayoral Committee (MMC) for Public Safety. Tsoleli had previously served in the Free State Provincial Legislature and in the National Assembly of South Africa.

== Early life and education ==
Tsoleli was born in Sterkspruit in what is today the Eastern Cape province of South Africa. She attended Makumsha Primary School, Amaqwathi Junior Secondary School, Sterkspruit Senior Secondary School and Nkululeko Senior Secondary School. She then studied at the Bensonvale College of Education, the University of the Free State and the University of the Witwatersrand. Tsoleli worked for the Department of Education as well.

== Political career ==
Tsoleli served as a member of the Free State Provincial Legislature from 2008 to 2014, representing the African National Congress. After the 2014 general election, she became an ANC member of the National Assembly of South Africa. She was appointed to serve on the Portfolio Committee on Social Development and the Portfolio Committee on Arts and Culture.

In March 2018, Tsoleli said that the South African Social Security Agency (Sassa) would never be a stable organisation with multiple acting appointments. In October of the same year, she said that she was "relieved" to hear that Sassa had phased out Cash Paymaster Services (CPS) in favour of the South African Post Office (SAPO) for the payment of social grants. Tsoleli did not stand for re-election to the National Assembly in the 2019 general election.

In April 2023, Tsoleli was sworn in as a councillor of the Mangaung Metropolitan Municipality after ANC councillors were expelled for voting with the opposition. She was appointed Member of the Mayoral Committee for Public Safety by acting mayor Gregory Nthatisi the following month.

In June 2025, the Bloemfontein Equality Court found Tsoleli liable for hate speech, harassment and unfair discrimination after she forwarded WhatsApp messages containing racist content about former Mangaung Speaker Stephanie Lockman-Naidoo and members of the Indian community. The court ordered her to pay R50,000 in damages, issue a written public apology, publish the apology in local newspapers, and complete a South African Human Rights Commission-approved race sensitisation programme. In July 2026, the Free State High Court dismissed her appeal with costs, leaving the Equality Court's order in force.

== Professional career ==
In February 2022, Tsoleli was appointed deputy chairperson of the board of the Afrikaans Language Monument.
