= Wilma Newhoudt-Druchen =

South African politician

Wilma Newhoudt-Druchen is a South African politician who is the country's first Deaf female Member of Parliament. She attended Gallaudet University and was elected the vice-president of the World Federation of the Deaf in 2011. A member of the African National Congress, Newhoudt-Druchen has championed efforts to make South African Sign Language an official language of the country.
