= Mbulelo Bara =

South African politician

Mbulelo Bara MP

Permanent delegate to the National Council of Provinces from Gauteng
- Incumbent
- Assumed office 23 May 2019

Member of the National Assembly of South Africa
- In office 14 November 2016 – 7 May 2019
- Preceded by: Makashule Gana

Personal details
- Born: Mbulelo Richmond Bara
- Party: Democratic Alliance

Mbulelo Richmond Bara is a South African politician of the Democratic Alliance who has been a permanent delegate to the National Council of Provinces since 23 May 2019. He is a member of the Gauteng provincial delegation. Between 14 November 2016 and 7 May 2019, he served as a member of the National Assembly.

== Career ==
=== National Assembly ===
On 14 November 2016, Bara was sworn in as a Member of the National Assembly, replacing Makashule Gana.

He served as a member of the Portfolio Committee on Cooperative Governance and Traditional Affairs between 8 December 2016 and 7 June 2017, when he became a member of the Portfolio Committee on Human Settlements.

He served in the National Assembly until 7 May 2019.

=== National Council of Provinces ===
On 22 May 2019, Bara was elected as a permanent delegate to the National Council of Provinces from the Gauteng province. He was sworn into office on 23 May 2019.

In June 2019, Bara became a member of both the Select Committee on Health Social and Services and the Select Committee on Education and Technology, Sports, Arts and Culture.
