= Frankfort, Eastern Cape =

Frankfort
- Location within Eastern Cape Location within South Africa
- Coordinates: 32.757°S 27.464°E
- Country: South Africa
- Province: Eastern Cape
- District: Amathole
- Municipality: Amahlathi

Area
  - Total: 3.35 km^{2} (1.29 sq mi)

Population (2011)
  - Total: 2,043
  - Density: 610/km^{2} (1,580/sq mi)

Racial makeup (2011)
  - Black African: 99.8%
  - Coloured: 0.1%

First languages (2011)
  - Xhosa: 98.5%
  - Other: 1.5%
- Time zone: UTC+2 (SAST)
- Postal code (street): 5655
- PO box: 5655
- Area code: 043

Frankfort is a village in Amathole District Municipality in the Eastern Cape province of South Africa. Also known as eDonqaba.

Village 51 km north-east of Qonce. It developed from a settlement of members of the British-German Legion in 1857 and is named after Frankfurt in Germany.
