= Herman Groenewald =

South African politician

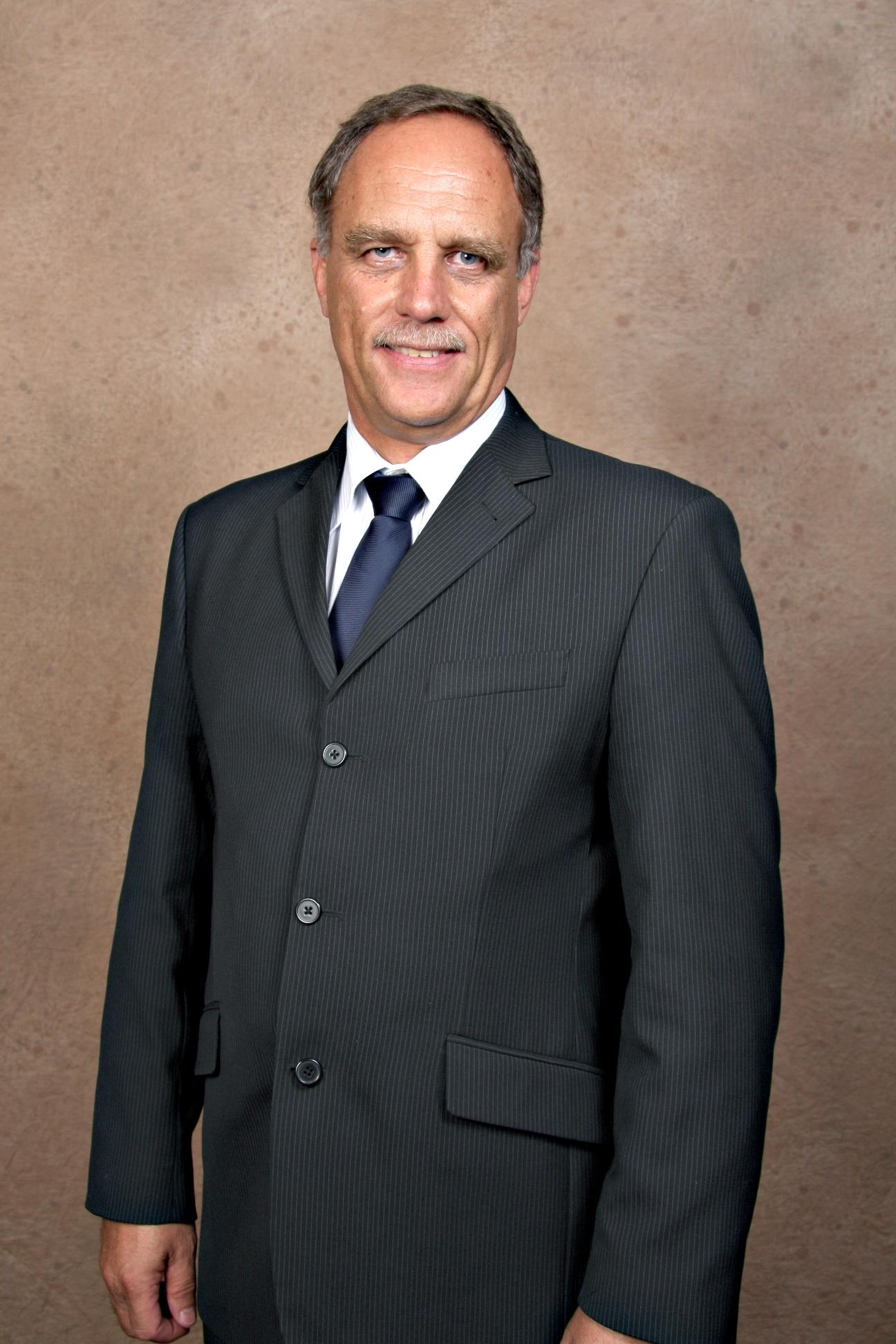
- Groenewald in 2009

Member of the National Assembly of South Africa
- In office 12 November 2015 – 7 May 2019

Permanent delegate to the National Council of Provinces from the North West
- In office 7 May 2009 – 11 November 2015

Personal details
- Born: Hermanus Bernadus Groenewald
- Party: Democratic Alliance
- Profession: Politician

Hermanus Bernadus Groenewald is a South African politician who served as a Member of the National Assembly between 2015 and 2019. Prior to his tenure in the National Assembly, he was a permanent delegate to the National Council of Provinces from the North West from 2009 to 2015. Groenewald is a member of the Democratic Alliance.

== Parliamentary career ==
=== National Council of Provinces ===
In 2009, Groenewald was elected as a permanent delegate to the National Council of Provinces from the North West. He was the sole Democratic Alliance politician in the provincial delegation. Between 2009 and 2014, he was a member of the following select committees: public services, women, children and people with disabilities, and labour and public enterprises. Groenewald was also a member of the Joint Committee on Delegated Legislation.

After the 2014 South African general election, he returned to the NCOP and served as a member of the following select committees: social services, communications and public enterprises, and education and recreation. Groenewald resigned from the NCOP on 11 November 2015. Chris Hattingh filled his seat.

=== National Assembly ===
On 12 November 2015, Groenewald was sworn in as a Member of the National Assembly of South Africa. He left parliament on 7 May 2019, as he was not a candidate for that year's general election.
