= Sophie Thembekwayo =

South African politician

Member of the South African National Assembly
- Incumbent
- Assumed office January 2017

Personal details
- Party: Economic Freedom Fighters
- Profession: Politician

Sophie Suzan Thembekwayo is a South African politician and a member of parliament for the Economic Freedom Fighters (EFF). She was appointed to parliament in January 2017, replacing Hlayiseka Chewane. Thembekwayo was elected to a full term as a parliamentarian in 2019. She was re-elected at the 2024 general election.
