= Mamonare Chueu =

South African politician

Member of the National Assembly of South Africa
- In office 21 May 2014 – 7 May 2019
- Constituency: Gauteng

Member of the Gauteng Provincial Legislature
- In office 6 May 2009 – 6 May 2014

Personal details
- Party: African National Congress

Mamonare Patricia Chueu is a South African politician who served as a Member of the National Assembly of South Africa from 2014 until 2019. Before that, she was a member of the Gauteng Provincial Legislature between 2009 and 2014. Chueu is a member of the African National Congress.

== Political career ==
Chueu was elected to the Gauteng Provincial Legislature in 2009 as a member of the African National Congress. She served as chairperson of the portfolio committee on education before she was appointed chairperson of the re-established portfolio committee on social development in August 2012.

Chueu stood for the National Assembly of South Africa in the 2014 general election, ranked 7th on the ANC's Gauteng regional-to-national list. She was elected to a seat in the National Assembly at the election. During her tenure in parliament, she was a member of the Portfolio Committee on Women in The Presidency. She was also a member of the Ad Hoc Committee on the Filling of Vacancies in the Commission for Gender Equality and the Ad Hoc Committee on the Filling of Vacancies in the Commission for Gender Equality (2019). Chueu was not included on any ANC candidate list for the 2019 general election and left parliament as a result.
