= Tarnia Baker =

South African politician (1966/1967–2017)

Member of the National Assembly of South Africa
- In office 2014–2017

Personal details
- Born: 1966/1967
- Died: 6 October 2017
- Party: Democratic Alliance

Tarnia Baker (1966/1967 – 6 October 2017) was a South African politician. A native of Durban, she later moved to Mpumalanga.

She was elected to the National Assembly in 2014 as a member of the Democratic Alliance. Baker died on 6 October 2017, aged 50, after a truck hit her while she was crossing the street in Park Rynie on the KwaZulu-Natal South Coast.

== See also ==
- List of members of the National Assembly of South Africa who died in office
