= Phoebe Noxolo Abraham =

South African politician

Member of the National Assembly of South Africa
- Constituency: National List

Personal details
- Born: October 7, 1960 (age 65)
- Party: African National Congress
- Occupation: Politician
- Committees: Standing Committee on Finance

Phoebe Noxolo Abraham (born 7 October 1960) is a South African politician who served as a member of the National Assembly of South Africa. She is a member of the African National Congress. She was number 103 of the party-list at the 2019 South African general election.

She is a member of the Standing Committee on Finance.

She was formerly a member of the Eastern Cape Provincial Legislature.

Abraham was not included on the ANC's candidate list for the 2024 general election and subsequently left Parliament following the election.
