= Brandon Topham =

South African politician (born 1971)

Brandon Topham MP

Deputy Shadow Minister of the Auditor General
- Incumbent
- Assumed office October 2015
- Leader: Mmusi Maimane

Deputy Shadow Minister of Appropriations

Member of Parliament for Midrand, Gauteng

Personal details
- Born: June 7, 1971 (age 55) Pretoria, South Africa
- Party: Democratic Alliance
- Education: University of South Africa
- Occupation: Member of Parliament
- Profession: Politician, Community Leader, Businessman

Brandon Rodney Topham (born Pretoria, 7 June 1971) is a South African politician, community leader and businessman. He is also a South African Freemason

== Business life ==
Brandon Topham has served on the boards of a wide variety of businesses, often as Secretary, CFO, Financial Director or Non Executive Director. These companies include 1time Airline, Ecsponent Limited, SEESA (Pty) Ltd, Telemasters Holdings Limited and the Professional Provident Society (PPS).

== Education ==
He is a Qualified Lawyer, Chartered Accountant, Certified Fraud Examiner (CFE), and Chartered Management Accountant (CIMA).

== Political life ==
Topham became interested in politics at the age of 16 when he witnessed the unfairness of apartheid. He avoided compulsory military service when he went to university.

As a long-standing member of the Democratic Alliance, South Africa's main opposition party, he was chosen to be the DA's candidate for mayor of the City of Tshwane in 2011. The governing ANC retained the metro, however. Topham thereafter led the DA opposition in the Tshwane council.

After standing unsuccessfully to be the party's mayoral candidate again in 2016, Topham instead became a Member of the South African Parliament for the DA and served as Deputy Shadow Minister of The Auditor General, and The Deputy Shadow Minister of Appropriations.

In October 2016 Topham criticised Minister of Finance Malusi Gigaba and suggested that there is more to the South African Revenue Service's collection shortfall of R50.8 Billion and that "There may be a rolling of payment and collection. I suggest you do a performance appraisal for senior SARS officials and see if they’ve reported truthfully."

In 2018, Topham resigned from parliament.

== Freemasonry ==
Topham has been named grand treasurer of the Grand Lodge of South Africa in 2015. He is currently listed as Secretary of Lodge Koh-I-Noor no 79 in Pretoria.

In March 2016 the Freemasons were accused of influencing the Democratic Alliance's candidate list. Topham dismissed these claims and stated "The Freemasons are not a secret society and do not take oaths. Some people who do not believe all men are created equal, use it as a bogeyman, as the Broederbond did in the previous dispensation" He further mentioned that only about 30 public representatives nationwide are Freemasons.

== Forensic Accounting ==
The forensic report detailing how R1,4 Billion disappeared during the Fidentia Scandal, a Ponzi Scheme, was co-compiled by Topham.
