= Hlomela Bucwa =

South African politician

Hlomela Bucwa is a South African politician, a member of the Democratic Alliance. In 2016 she became the youngest member of parliament in South Africa.

== Education ==
She attended the Nelson Mandela Metropolitan University (NMMU) and is known to have studied Law but she did not graduate. In 2015, she was the Student Representative Council (SRC) president of the university, the first female to be elected as president of the council.

== Career ==
She began her career in politics while in the university but became actively involved in 2011 as an activist for the Democratic Alliance Student Association. After joining the school's SRC in 2014, she became president in 2016 and served on the university’s highest decision-making body, the NMMU Council. In August 2016, she was among three candidates selected to represent the Democratic Alliance in contesting for a seat in the National Assembly. She was sworn into parliament in November 2016 and she became the Baby of the House taking over the title from Yusuf Cassim. During her term of office at the National Assembly, she was a member of the Portfolio Committee on Higher Education and Training.
