= Sibusiso Radebe =

South African politician

Sibusiso Radebe MP

Member of the National Assembly of South Africa
- In office April 2009 – June 2018
- Constituency: Gert Sibande

Personal details
- Born: Goodwill Sibusiso Radebe; 1978 Nhlazatje, Mpumalanga, South Africa
- Died: 19 June 2018 (aged 39–40) Roodepoort, Gauteng, South Africa
- Cause of death: Gunshot
- Resting place: Elukwatini, Mpumalanga
- Party: African National Congress (ANC), South African Communist Party (SACP)
- Education: Elukwatini
- Occupation: Politician
- Committees: Portfolio Committee on Transport

Goodwill Sibusiso Radebe (1978 - 19 June 2018) was a South African politician who served as a member of the National Assembly from 2009 until his murder in 2018. He was a member of the African National Congress (ANC) and South African Communist Party (SACP).

Radebe was a member of the executive committee of the SACP in the Gert Sibande district at the time of his death. He was elected as the first district secretary of the Young Communist League in 2003. He became a provincial treasurer of the African National Congress Youth League (ANCYL) in 2008 and elected to Parliament in the 2009 South African general election.

In Parliament, he served as a member of the Portfolio Committee on Transport

== Death ==
He was shot dead on 19 June 2018 outside the home of his 35-year-old girlfriend Tshegofatso Ntseke (a married woman) in Roodepoort. Police said Radebe was with Ntseke in his BMW X6 outside her home when two suspects approached the car and shot Radebe dead.
