= Khanyisile Litchfield-Tshabalala =

South African admiral and politician

Khanyisile Litchfield-Tshabalala is a South African politician and former Navy admiral.

== Early life and education ==
She was born in Soweto and later joined Umkhonto we Sizwe in exile in Angola. On her return to South Africa she completed a politics and drama degree at the University of Cape Town and an honours degree in criminology.

== Naval career ==
She joined the South African Navy on 1 April 1997 and became the first woman to be promoted to the rank of Rear Admiral (Junior Grade) when she assumed the post of Director of Fleet Force Human Resources at Fleet Command on 1 January 2004. She later resigned after she was convicted by a military court for fraudulently reporting the theft of a laptop. The missing laptop was never found and she denied fabricating the theft.

== Political career ==
She entered parliament as a member of the Economic Freedom Fighters (EFF) following the 2014 general election.

On 3 June 2015 she resigned from Parliament and joined the United Democratic Movement (UDM), and was immediately tasked as a party National Organiser. In December 2015, she was elected deputy president of the UDM. In late September 2016, she left the UDM, citing her desire to pursue further education, however commentators claim that she fell out with Holomisa.

She later joined uMkhonto weSizwe Party and was elected as a member of the National Assembly of South Africa again in the 2024 general election.
