= Beatrice Ngcobo =

South African politician and activist (1943–2018)

Member of the National Assembly
- In office 23 April 2004 – 18 February 2018
- Constituency: KwaZulu-Natal

Personal details
- Born: 18 July 1943 Port Shepstone, Natal; Union of South Africa
- Died: 18 February 2018 (aged 74)
- Party: African National Congress
- Education: University of South Africa; University of Natal

Beatrice Thembekile Ngcobo (18 July 1943 – 18 February 2018) was a South African politician and activist who represented the African National Congress (ANC) in the National Assembly from 2004 until her death in 2018. She served the KwaZulu-Natal constituency from 2009 onwards and chaired the Portfolio Committee on Tourism from 2014 to 2018.

Before joining Parliament, Ngcobo served in the Commission for Gender Equality from 1997 to 2004. A nurse by profession, she also taught nursing at the University of Natal and was a prominent activist for the rights of disabled people.

== Early life and nursing career ==
Ngcobo was born on 18 July 1943 in Port Shepstone in the former Natal Province. She matriculated at Inanda Seminary, where she was a prefect, and trained as a nurse and midwife at McCord Hospital in Durban.

In 1969, she enrolled at Wentworth Nursing College, where she completed a diploma in intensive nursing science, and she subsequently worked for many years as a nursing sister at Durban's Wentworth Hospital. Initially serving the surgical and medical cardiothoracic wards, she later worked in the trauma and emergency unit; as the night superintendent and trainer of intensive care nurses; and as part of the inaugural nursing team in the burns and plastic surgery unit, which was founded in 1981.

== Activism and academic career ==
=== Disability activism ===
During her time at Wentworth Hospital, in 1978, Ngcobo's legs were paralysed by spina bifida. She used a wheelchair thereafter but continued to work as a nurse and became active in activism for the rights of disabled people. She was a founding member and long-time supporter of Disabled People South Africa, an affiliate of Disabled Peoples' International, and also lobbied for the establishment of the Disabled Students Forum at her alma mater, the University of Natal.

=== University of Natal ===
Ngcobo completed a bachelor's in nursing science health services management at the University of South Africa in 1988 and went on to enrol at the University of Natal, where she completed an advanced nursing education diploma in 1989 and a master's degree in 1992. From 1995, she worked as a lecturer in nursing at the University of Natal's Durban campus.

=== Gender activism ===
In 1997, President Nelson Mandela appointed Ngcobo to the inaugural Commission for Gender Equality, where she served as a commissioner until 2004. She was a full-time commissioner for the provinces of KwaZulu-Natal and Mpumalanga, in which capacity she was particularly interested in the rights of women in rural communities, and she also served as acting chairperson of the commission in 2002 after the expiry of Joy Piliso-Seroke's term.

== Legislative career ==
Ngcobo was first elected to the National Assembly in the 2004 general election, although, due to a technicality regarding her eligibility which went unnoticed until 2005, she was not legally sworn in to the seat until 15 September 2005. She was re-elected to her seat in the 2009 and 2014 elections, and from 2009 she represented the KwaZulu-Natal constituency.

At the outset of her third term in Parliament in 2014, the ANC nominated her to chair the Portfolio Committee on Tourism. In her capacity as chairperson, she was admired for insisting on joining committee oversight visits to remote areas that were not easily accessed in a wheelchair, including, shortly before her death, the site of a new lighthouse at Cape Agulhas. Also in 2014, the ANC nominated her to serve as a member of the ad hoc committee that absolved President Jacob Zuma of personal liability for controversial upgrades at his Nkandla homestead.

Ngcobo fell ill after undergoing surgery in January 2018 and died on 18 February 2018. Her seat in the National Assembly was filled by Peggy Nkonyeni.
