= Willie Aucamp =

South African politician

The Honourable Willie Aucamp MP
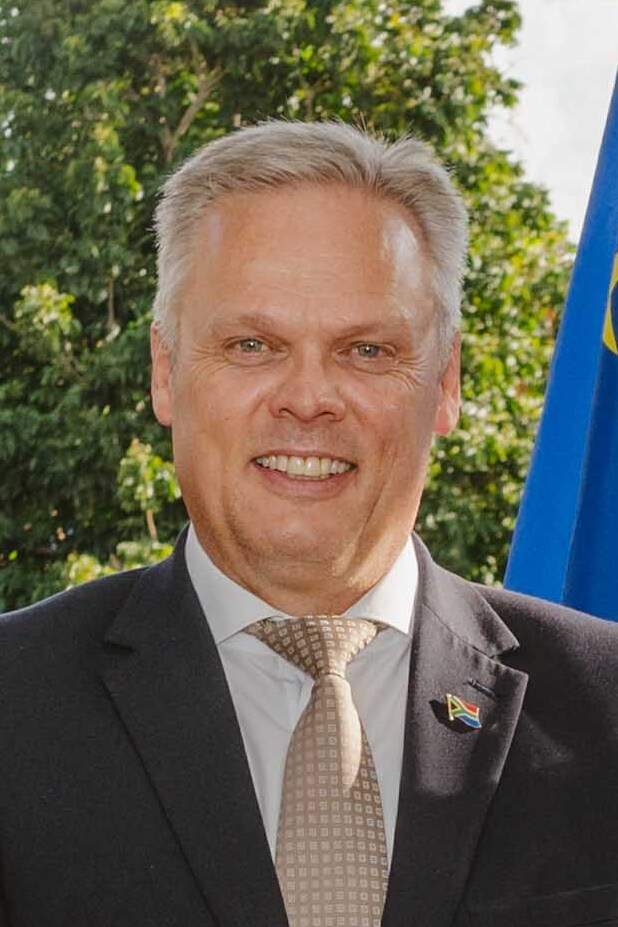
- Aucamp in 2025

Minister of Agriculture
- Incumbent
- Assumed office 30 June 2026
- President: Cyril Ramaphosa
- Deputy: Rosemary Capa
- Preceded by: John Steenhuisen

Minister of Forestry, Fisheries and the Environment
- In office 17 November 2025 – 30 June 2026
- President: Cyril Ramaphosa
- Deputy: Narend Singh; Bernice Swarts
- Preceded by: Dion George
- Succeeded by: David Maynier

National Spokesperson of the Democratic Alliance
- In office 15 July 2024 – 17 November 2025
- Leader: John Steenhuisen
- Preceded by: Solly Malatsi; Werner Horn
- Succeeded by: Jan de Villiers

Member of the National Assembly of South Africa
- Incumbent
- Assumed office 14 June 2024

Permanent Delegate to the National Council of Provinces

Assembly Member for Northern Cape
- In office 23 May 2019 – 28 May 2024

Personal details
- Born: Willem Abraham Stephanus Aucamp Thabazimbi, Limpopo; South Africa
- Party: Democratic Alliance
- Spouse: Carol Johnson (m. 2004; div. 2004)
- Parent: Cassie Aucamp
- Nickname: Willie

Willem Abraham Stephanus Aucamp is a South African politician who has served as the Minister of Agriculture since June 2026 and a Member of the National Assembly of South Africa since 2024 He served as the Minister of Forestry, Fisheries and the Environment from November 2025 until June 2026. He is a former National Spokesperson of the Democratic Alliance (DA). Prior to his election to the National Assembly, he was one of six permanent delegates from the Northern Cape to the National Council of Provinces from 2019 to 2024.

== Political career ==
Aucamp's father was formerly the leader of the Afrikaner Eenheidsbeweging (AEB) but resigned in 2003 to form the National Action (NA). Aucamp joined his father's new party and became its Gauteng provincial leader. However, the NA lost all of its parliamentary representation in the April 2004 general election and was soon dissolved.

He later joined the Democratic Alliance (DA). In 2016, he was elected as a ward councillor of the Ga-Segonyana Local Municipality.

In May 2019, Aucamp was elected to the National Council of Provinces. He was one of six permanent delegates from the Northern Cape. In 2020, he stood for election as leader of the DA's Northern Cape branch. However, when the provincial congress was held on 5 December 2020, he lost the vote to the outgoing provincial chairperson, Harold McGluwa.

Aucamp stood as a DA parliamentary candidate on the National list in the 2024 general election and was subsequently elected to the National Assembly of South Africa. He was sworn in on 14 June 2024. He served as a DA Whip and was a member of the Portfolio Committee on Agriculture.

In July 2024, he also was appointed by DA leader John Steenhuisen as one of the DA's national spokespersons, together with fellow MP Karabo Khakhau.

On 7 November 2025, Steenhuisen requested that President Cyril Ramaphosa appoint Aucamp as the Minister of Forestry, Fisheries and the Environment, succeeding Dion George. On 12 November 2025, Ramaphosa acceded to Steenhuisen's request and appointed Aucamp to the position. The National Council of SPCAs and the Wildlife Animal Protection Forum of South Africa (WAPFSA) expressed concerns over Aucamp's appointment due to his ties to the captive wildlife industry. Aucamp was sworn into office on 17 November 2025 by Judge Sulet Potterill. Jan de Villiers succeeded him as party spokesman.

On 17 June 2026, the newly elected DA leader Geordin Hill-Lewis requested that Ramaphosa appoint Aucamp as the Minister of Agriculture, succeeding former DA leader Steenhuisen. Hill-Lewis tasked Aucamp with resolving the legal issues surrounding the department's handling of the foot-and-mouth disease outbreak in South Africa. Ramaphosa reshuffled his cabinet on 30 June, moving Aucamp to the agriculture portfolio. Western Cape Minister of Education David Maynier was appointed to succeed Aucamp as Minister of Forestry, Fisheries and the Environment.

== Personal life ==
Aucamp married New National Party (NNP) spokesperson Carol Johnson in July 2004. The marriage was short-lived as Johnson filed for divorce in September 2004, citing Aucamp's financial status and her not being informed about his child that was born out of wedlock.
