= Andries Beyers (politician) =

South African politician (born 1946)

Member of the National Assembly
- In office May 1994 – June 1999

Member of the House of Assembly

Assembly Member for Potchefstroom
- In office February 1992 – April 1994

Personal details
- Born: Andries Stephanus Beyers; 24 October 1946 (age 79)
- Citizenship: South Africa
- Party: National Action
- Other political affiliations: National Party (1993–2000); Afrikaner Volksunie (1992–93); Conservative Party (1982–92)

Andries Stephanus Beyers (born 24 October 1946) is a South African politician who served in Parliament from 1992 to 1999. He was the national secretary of the far-right Conservative Party from 1987 to 1992 but he later represented the National Party.

Beyers was a member of the National Party until 1981, when he resigned in protest of what he viewed as the party's soft stance on apartheid. He was a founding member of the Conservative Party the following year. In February 1992, he was elected to represent the Potchefstroom constituency, formerly a National Party stronghold, in the House of Assembly; the Conservatives' victory in the by-election contributed to President F. W. de Klerk's decision to hold a referendum on apartheid the following month.

Soon after the by-election and referendum, Beyers left the Conservatives to found the Afrikaner Volksunie, a short-lived Afrikaner separatist movement which participated in the negotiations to end apartheid in 1993. In November 1993, Beyers abandoned the Volksunie and rejoined the National Party, under whose banner he served in the post-apartheid National Assembly from 1994 to 1999. In 2000, he again left the National Party – on that occasion in protest of its alliance with the Democratic Party – and he later became a founding member of National Action.

== Early life and career ==
Beyers was born on 24 October 1946 to a conservative Afrikaans family; both of his grandparents fought in the Boer War and their forebears partook in the 1838 Great Trek. He followed his father in joining the National Party (NP) in his youth and was an admirer of Prime Minister Hendrik Verwoerd, but he resigned from the party in 1981, dismayed by what he viewed as the dilution of the NP's policy of apartheid. He later said that he regarded then-Prime Minister P. W. Botha as "dangerously left-leaning".

== Apartheid-era political career ==
Beyers joined the far-right Conservative Party (CP), a breakaway from the NP, when it was founded in 1982, and he became the CP's national secretary in 1987. After the 1988 local elections, in which the CP won control of several municipalities, primarily in the Transvaal, Beyers caused a minor international outcry by promising that the CP would re-segregate public services in CP-controlled areas. In 1991, he was called as a witness in Winnie Mandela's kidnapping trial after the CP claimed publicly that government agents had abducted one of the key witnesses for the prosecution, aiming to protect Mandela and therefore maintain friendly relations between the NP and Mandela's African National Congress (ANC). When Beyers refused to reveal the source for his party's claim, he was sentenced to 14 days in prison.

=== Potchefstroom by-election ===
In early 1992, while he was still serving as national secretary, Beyers was called in as a CP "heavyweight" to stand as the party's candidate in a parliamentary by-election in Potchefstroom in the Western Transvaal. The seat had been left vacant after the death of the NP's Louis le Grange and since 1948, when the NP came to power, had been regarded as a safe seat for the NP. However, the CP had made gains among conservative whites after the NP announced its intention to embark on negotiations to end apartheid, a policy strenuously opposed by the CP. The Potchefstroom by-election was regarded as a "barometer of white support" for the NP's new policy and President F. W. de Klerk was personally involved in campaigning for the NP candidate, Theuns Kriel.

When the election was held in February 1992, Beyers won comfortably with 56 per cent of the vote, receiving 9,746 votes against Kriel's 7,606. It was the third by-election that the NP had lost to the CP in two years, and Beyers concluded, "The message to Mr. de Klerk is to resign and call a general election". The Potchefstroom by-election was directly linked to de Klerk's decision to call a whites-only referendum on apartheid the following month, which gave the NP a mandate to continue with negotiations.

=== Negotiations to end apartheid ===
Beyers continued to represent the Potchefstroom constituency in the House of Assembly until the next general election, but during that period he left the CP and earned a reputation as politically "promiscuous". Later in 1992, he established his own small party, Afrikaner Volksunie, whose major policy platform was the establishment of an Afrikaner homeland in a geographically diminished territory of South Africa; he later explained that the formation of the Volksunie was a response to the need to adapt after the March 1992 referendum result. In 1993, Afrikaner Volksunie participated in the Multi-Party Negotiating Forum on constitutional change, but it joined forces with the CP and three conservative bantustan leaders (Mangosuthu Buthelezi, Lucas Mangope, and Oupa Gqozo) to establish the dissident Concerned South Africans Group.

Through 1993, the Volksunie's support base was diminished by the rise of the new and more ambitiously separatist Afrikaner Volksfront, and Beyers announced in early November 1993 that he would rejoin the NP. He said that his decision was motivated by his realisation that multi-racial democracy was inevitable. Announcing his change of allegiance, he told the Independent that his views about apartheid had changed:

I have realised it was terribly wrong. I thought it was the best solution to the country's problems but it was wrong because I wanted to prescribe what was good for me and for blacks without asking them for their opinion. It is only now, in the last two or three years, after my whole life in politics that I have communicated with black leaders for the first time. Before I only related to them as labourers... Today, I can't understand why in the Sixties my leaders did not talk to the ANC, why they threw them in jail. Because now I regard the leadership of the ANC as quite moderate people – as social democrats with whom it is possible to share a real democracy. I have met Mr [Nelson] Mandela three or four times and I regard him as a reasonable, responsible leader. I had expected something very different.

== Post-apartheid political career ==
South Africa's first democratic elections were held in April 1994 and Beyers was elected to represent the NP in the new multi-racial National Assembly. He served for a single term, leaving after he failed to gain re-election in the 1999 general election.

In 2000, Beyers resigned from the NP (by then restyled as the New National Party) in protest of the party's decision to form the Democratic Alliance with the moderate Democratic Party. He announced that he and other white right-wing politicians, including Cassie Aucamp and Ferdi Hartzenberg, were planning to launch a new "Christian nationalist" party modelled after the NP as it had been during the early decades of apartheid, under Prime Ministers Verwoerd and D. F. Malan. In June 2002, he was a founding member of National Action, a party led by Aucamp and focused on Afrikaner interests.

== See also ==
- Afrikaner nationalism
