= Carol Johnson (South African politician) =

South African politician (born 1972)

Member of the National Assembly
- In office 23 April 2004 – May 2009

Personal details
- Born: 4 July 1972 (age 53)
- Citizenship: South Africa
- Party: African National Congress (since 2005); New National Party (until 2005)
- Spouse: Willie Aucamp (m. 2004; div. 2004)

Carol Beatrix Johnson (born 4 July 1972) is a South African politician who served in the National Assembly from 2004 to 2009. She was the spin doctor of the New National Party (NNP) until September 2005, when she crossed the floor to join the African National Congress (ANC).

== Political career ==
Johnson was born on 4 July 1972. She was the national spokesman and spin doctor for the NNP in the early 2000s and was viewed as one of the "top lieutenants" of party leader Marthinus van Schalkwyk. In the 2004 general election, she was elected to an NNP seat in the National Assembly, representing the Western Cape constituency. During the election period, she told the Guardian that the NNP would "be around for a long time to come".

However, when van Schalkwyk announced in August 2004 that he intended to join the ANC, Johnson said that she would follow him: she, van Schalkwyk, and six other NNP members announced that they intended to defect from the party to the ANC during the next floor-crossing period. She officially remained an NNP member until 1 September 2005, when, at the outset of the 2005 floor-crossing window, she formally joined the ANC. She left her seat after the 2009 general election.

== Personal life ==
Johnson married politician Willie Aucamp, the son of Cassie Aucamp, on 10 July 2004 in the Stellenbosch Dutch Reformed Church. Their marriage followed a "whirlwind romance" that began on election night in April 2004. When Johnson left the NNP, Aucamp left his own party, Nasionale Aksie, to join the ANC with her. She filed for divorce shortly afterwards in September 2004.
