= Werner Horn (South African politician) =

South African politician

Werner Horn MP
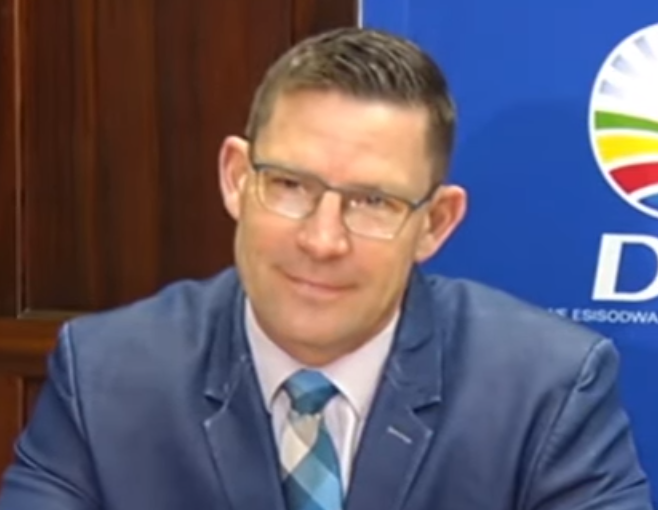
- Horn in September 2019

House Chairperson of the National Assembly of South Africa
- Incumbent
- Assumed office 9 July 2024 Serving with Cedric Frolick, Zandile Majozi
- Speaker: Thoko Didiza

National Spokesperson of the Democratic Alliance
- In office 21 April 2023 – 15 July 2024 Serving with Solly Malatsi
- Leader: John Steenhuisen
- Preceded by: Siviwe Gwarube
- Succeeded by: Willie Aucamp; Karabo Khakhau

Member of the National Assembly of South Africa
- Incumbent
- Assumed office 21 May 2014
- Constituency: Free State

Councillor of the Mangaung Metropolitan Municipality
- In office 2006–2014

Personal details
- Born: Werner Horn; 12 May 1970 (age 55)
- Party: Democratic Alliance
- Occupation: Member of Parliament
- Profession: Politician

Werner Horn (born 12 May 1970) is a South African lawyer and politician who has been one of three House Chairpersons in the National Assembly of South Africa since July 2024. He has served as a Member of Parliament since May 2014 and before that, he was a councillor of the Mangaung Metropolitan Municipality between 2006 and 2014. Horn is a member of the Democratic Alliance.

== Career ==
=== Local politics ===
Horn is a member of the Democratic Alliance. He was elected as a councillor of the Mangaung Metropolitan Municipality in March 2006. He was re-elected to a second term in May 2011.

=== Parliamentary career ===
Horn was elected to the National Assembly in the 7 May 2014 general election. He became an MP on 21 May 2014. He represents the Free State Province. On 5 June 2014, he was named Shadow Deputy Minister of the Justice and Correctional Services portfolios by the DA parliamentary leader, Mmusi Maimane. Horn served as the deputy for both Glynnis Breytenbach (Shadow Minister of Justice) and James Selfe (Shadow Minister of Correctional Services).

During his first term as an MP, he served as an Alternate Member of the Portfolio Committee on Justice and Constitutional Development. He was an Alternate Member of the Ad Hoc Committee to nominate a person for appointment of Public Protector between May 2016 and August 2016.

Horn was re-elected for a second term as an MP in May 2019. On 5 June 2019, Maimane appointed his new shadow cabinet, in which the Justice and Correctional Services portfolios were merged into one portfolio with Horn as the Shadow Deputy Minister and Glynnis Breytenbach as the Shadow Minister. He still serves on the Portfolio Committee on Justice and Correctional Services. On 27 February 2020, he became an Alternate Member of the Ad Hoc Committee to Amend Section 25 of the Constitution.

Newly elected DA leader John Steenhuisen announced his shadow cabinet on 5 December 2020 wherein he split the Justice and Correctional Services portfolio and appointed Horn as the new Shadow Deputy Minister of Justice.

Horn was appointed the DA's additional national spokesperson on 21 April 2023, following Cilliers Brink's election as Tshwane mayor the previous month.

Having been re-elected to Parliament in the 2024 general election, Horn was elected as one of three House Chairpersons of the National Assembly on 9 July 2024.

=== Provincial politics ===
On 14 November 2020, Horn was elected to succeed Annelie Lotriet as the provincial chairperson of the DA in the Free State. He was re-elected as provincial chairperson in 2023 before standing down in 2026.

=== 2026 campaign for DA Federal Council Chairperson ===
After incumbent DA Federal Council chairperson Helen Zille announced her intention to stand down at the party's Federal Congress in April 2026, Horn announced his candidacy for the position. He was defeated by Deputy Finance Minister Ashor Sarupen on 12 April 2026.
