= Andries Beyers =

Andries Beyers may refer to:

- Andries Beyers (politician) (born 1946), South African politician
- Andrew Beyers (1903–1975), South African jurist
