= Newcastle (House of Assembly of South Africa constituency) =

- Former constituency for the South African House of Assembly
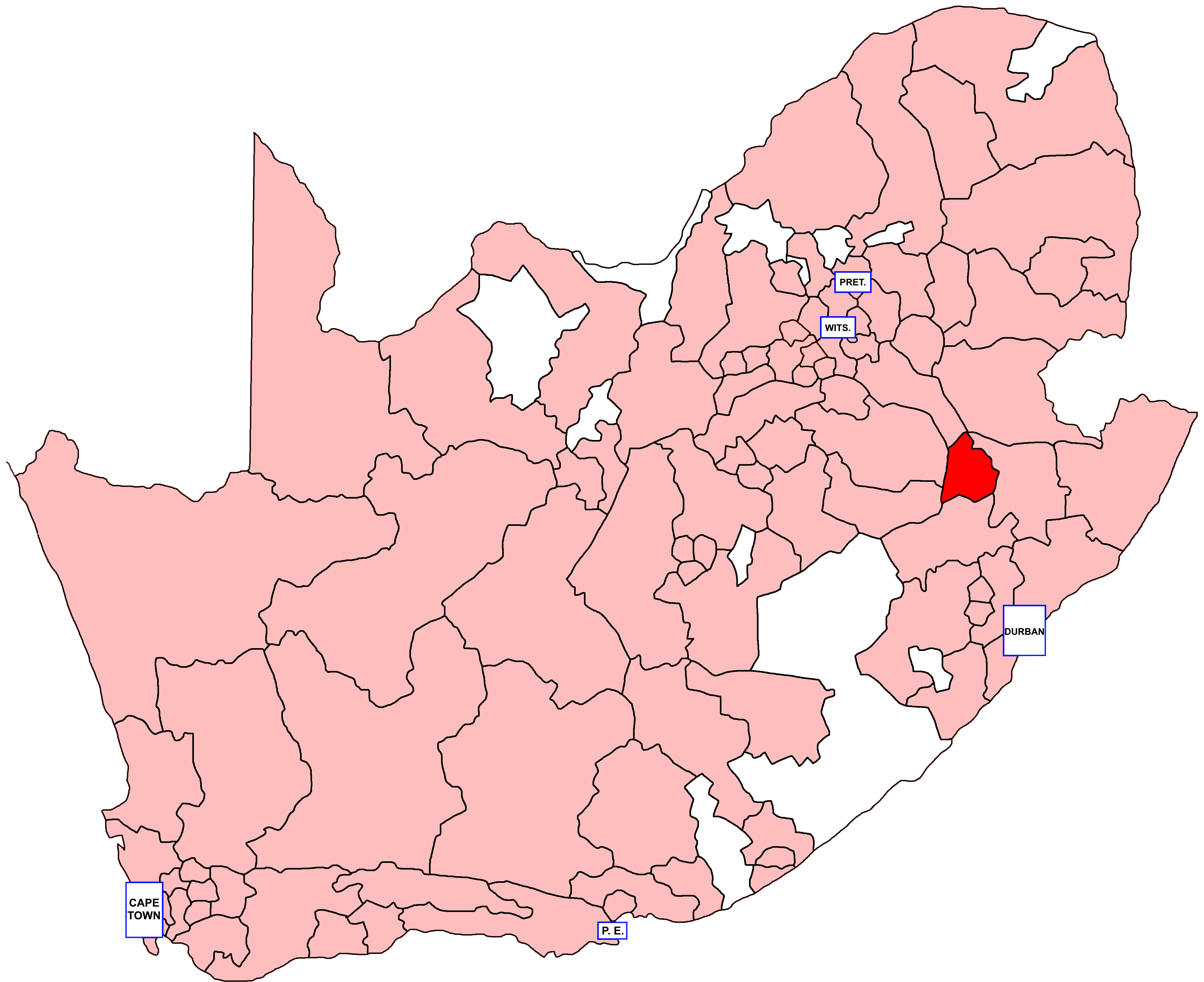
- Location of Newcastle within South Africa (1981)
- Province: Natal
- Electorate: 17,472 (1989)

Former constituency
- Created: 1910
- Abolished: 1994
- Number of members: 1
- Last MHA: Adriaan Blaas (NP)
- Replaced by: KwaZulu-Natal

Newcastle was a constituency in the Natal Province of South Africa, which existed from 1910 to 1994. It covered a region of northwestern Natal centred on its namesake town. Throughout its existence it elected one member to the House of Assembly.

== Franchise notes ==
When the Union of South Africa was formed in 1910, the electoral qualifications in use in each pre-existing colony were kept in place. The franchise used in the Natal Colony, while theoretically not restricted by race, was significantly less liberal than that of the Cape, and no more than a few hundred non-white electors ever qualified. In 1908, an estimated 200 of the 22,786 electors in the colony were of non-European descent, and by 1935, only one remained. By 1958, when the last non-white voters in the Cape were taken off the rolls, Natal too had an all-white electorate. The franchise was also restricted by property and education qualifications until the 1933 general election, following the passage of the Women's Enfranchisement Act, 1930 and the Franchise Laws Amendment Act, 1931. From then on, the franchise was given to all white citizens aged 21 or over, which remained the case until the end of apartheid and the introduction of universal suffrage in 1994.

== History ==
While most of Natal's white population (and, consequently, most of its electorate during the pre-1994 era) was English-speaking, the northwest of the province was more mixed, and Newcastle had a large Afrikaner presence throughout its existence. This made its politics (along with the neighbouring seats of Klip River and Vryheid) different from those of Natal as a whole, and the National Party had a significant foothold in the seat from its founding. In the early years, however, this foothold was never quite enough to dislodge the South African Party, whose candidates held the seat throughout the party's existence. When it merged into the United Party in 1934, Newcastle MP Overbeek Radyn Nel came along, and from 1938 onwards, Newcastle was a bellwether seat, always held by the governing party of the day. For most of that period, that meant the National Party, which captured it as part of their nationwide advance in 1948 and held it for the remainder of its existence. Unlike some other NP safe seats, Newcastle never went fully unopposed, but in 1977 and 1981, its MPs faced only token opposition from the Herstigte Nasionale Party, and in 1987 and 1989 the Conservative Party formed the main opposition in the seat.

== Members ==
Election	Member	Party
1910	H. G. Bosman	South African
1915	T. J. Nel	South African
1920	T. J. Nel	South African
1921	T. J. Nel	South African
1924	O. R. Nel	South African
1929	O. R. Nel	South African
1933	O. R. Nel	South African
1934	O. R. Nel	United
1938	O. R. Nel	United
1941 by	R. B. Robertson	United
1943	R. B. Robertson	United
1948	W. A. Maree	National
1953	W. A. Maree	National
1958	W. A. Maree	National
1961	W. A. Maree	National
1966	W. A. Maree	National
1968 by	P. J. van B. Viljoen	National
1970	P. J. van B. Viljoen	National
1974	P. J. van B. Viljoen	National
1977	P. J. van B. Viljoen	National
1981	W. J. Schoeman	National
1987	W. J. Schoeman	National
1989	Adriaan Blaas	National
1994	Constituency abolished	

== Detailed results ==
=== Elections in the 1910s ===
General election 1910: Newcastle
Party	Candidate	Votes	%	±%
South African	H. J. Bosman	533	53.0	New
Independent	E. W. Noyce	473	47.0	New
Majority		60	6.0	N/A
South African win (new seat)				

General election 1915: Newcastle
Party	Candidate	Votes	%	±%
South African	T. J. Nel	473	39.2	−13.8
Unionist	R. H. Struben	395	32.8	New
National	A. T. Spies	338	28.0	New
Majority		78	6.4	N/A
Turnout		1,206	65.7	N/A
South African hold		Swing	N/A	

=== Elections in the 1920s ===
General election 1920: Newcastle
Party	Candidate	Votes	%	±%
South African	T. J. Nel	682	54.2	+15.0
National	J. H. B. Wessels	576	45.8	+17.8
Majority		106	8.4	N/A
Turnout		1,258	73.8	+8.1
South African hold		Swing	N/A	

General election 1921: Newcastle
Party	Candidate	Votes	%	±%
South African	T. J. Nel	715	53.7	−0.5
National	J. J. Muller	616	46.3	+0.5
Majority		99	7.4	−1.0
Turnout		1,331	72.6	−1.2
South African hold		Swing	-0.5	

General election 1924: Newcastle
Party	Candidate	Votes	%	±%
South African	O. R. Nel	783	52.0	−1.7
National	J. H. B. Wessels	717	47.6	+1.3
Rejected ballots		7	0.4	N/A
Majority		66	4.4	−3.0
Turnout		1,507	82.8	−10.2
South African hold		Swing	-1.5	

General election 1929: Newcastle
Party	Candidate	Votes	%	±%
South African	O. R. Nel	1,011	50.7	−1.3
National	A. J. Potgieter	974	48.8	+1.2
Rejected ballots		10	0.5	+0.1
Majority		66	1.9	−2.5
Turnout		1,995	88.5	+6.3
South African hold		Swing	-1.3	

=== Elections in the 1930s ===
General election 1933: Newcastle
Party	Candidate	Votes	%	±%
South African	O. R. Nel	Unopposed		
South African hold				

General election 1938: Newcastle
Party	Candidate	Votes	%	±%
United	O. R. Nel	2,936	61.3	N/A
Purified National	C. A. Pienaar	1,799	37.5	New
Rejected ballots		58	1.2	N/A
Majority		1,137	23.7	N/A
Turnout		4,793	80.7	N/A
United hold		Swing	N/A	

=== Elections in the 1940s ===
Newcastle by-election, 10 December 1941
Party	Candidate	Votes	%	±%
United	R. B. Robertson	2,776	65.2	+3.9
Purified National	A. E. du Toit	1,448	34.0	−3.5
Rejected ballots		31	0.8	-0.4
Majority		1,328	31.2	+7.5
Turnout		4,255	84.2	+3.5
United hold		Swing	+3.8	
