= Department of Forestry, Fisheries and the Environment =

Department of the South African national government

- List: 10 other official names: Departement van Bosbou, Visserye en die Omgewing (Afrikaans); umNyango wezeBhoduluko (Southern Ndebele); iSebe lezamaHlathi, ezokuLoba noKusingqongileyo (Xhosa); uMnyango Wezindaba Zezemvelo (Zulu); Litiko Letendzawo (Swazi); Kgoro ya Merero ya Tikologo le Boet (Northern Sotho); Lefapha la Merero ya Tikoloho le Bohahlaudi (Sotho); Lefapha la Merero ya Tikologo le Bojanala (Tswana); Ndzawulo ya swa Mbangu (Tsonga); Muhasho wa zwa Mupo (Venda)

Department overview
- Formed: 2019; 7 years ago
- Preceding agencies: Department of Environmental Affairs; Department of Agriculture, Forestry and Fisheries
- Jurisdiction: Government of South Africa
- Annual budget: R 9.13 billion (2026/27)
- Ministers responsible: David Maynier, Minister of Forestry, Fisheries and the Environment; Narend Singh, Deputy Minister of Forestry, Fisheries and the Environment; Bernice Swarts, Deputy Minister of Forestry, Fisheries and the Environment
- Department executive: Nomfundo Tshabalala, Director-General Department of Forestry, Fisheries and the Environment
- Website: www.dffe.gov.za/index.php/home-page

The Department of Forestry, Fisheries and the Environment (DFFE) is one of the departments of the South African government. It is responsible for protecting, conserving and improving the South African environment and natural resources.

The department was created in 2019, through the merger of the Department of Environmental Affairs with the forestry and fisheries components of the Department of Agriculture, Forestry and Fisheries.

In 2025, the DFFE had an annual budget of R9 billion.

== Branches ==
The branches of the Department of Forestry, Fisheries and the Environment are:

- Air Quality and Climate Change
- Biodiversity & Conservation
- Chemicals and Waste Management
- Environmental Advisory Services
- Environmental Programmes
- Legal Authorisations and Compliance Inspectorate
- Oceans and Coasts
- Office of the Chief Operating Officer

=== Initiatives ===
- Working for the Coast

== See also ==
- Environmental issues in Southern Africa
- Geography of South Africa#Environmental issues
- Minister of Environmental Affairs
- South African National Biodiversity Institute (SANBI) – Institution under the South African Department of Environmental Affairs
- Recycling in South Africa
