= Recycling in South Africa =

There is no national law that mandates recycling in South Africa. However, doing so is strongly encouraged by governments at all levels, to reduce the amount of waste that ends up in landfills.

Waste management is handled at the municipal level, and recycling drop-off sites are provided. Private companies also offer recycling collection, and SA has community-based initiatives focused on recycling.

For public safety and to protect the environment, metro bylaws place restrictions on waste disposal methods. For example, through prohibitions on the burning of trash, and disposing of trash in public areas.

== Symbols ==
=== Material source ===
An item's material source is a voluntary element that appears in a rectangle alongside the name of the part of the packaging to which it refers. For example, "Made from a minimum of 35% recycled plastic".

=== Recyclability ===
A recyclability symbol is commonly used to indicate that a component part of packaging is recyclable.

Labels may say, for example, "Paper Recycle" to specify the type of material, or "Widely Recycled". For non-recyclables, a black-and-white version of the recyclability icon with a line through it is used, with the title "Not Recycled".

=== Codes ===
South Africa uses the European Commission's recycling codes, such as its resin identification codes for plastics (originally created by the Society of the Plastics Industry). The country also uses variants of the universal recycling symbol, with 3 clockwise chasing arrows.

The symbols used in South Africa to represent various kinds of recyclables are shown in the table below. The list is not exhaustive.

Recycling symbols used in South Africa
PET	Polyester fibers, soft drink bottles, food containers
PE	Plastic milk containers, plastic bags, bottle caps, trash cans, oil cans, plastic lumber
PVC	Window frames, bottles for chemicals, flooring, plumbing pipes
PE-LD	Plastic bags, Ziploc bags, buckets
PP	Microwavable food containers, bumpers, car interior trim, industrial fibers, carry-out beverage cups
PS	Beverage/food coolers, carry-out food containers, Styrofoam
Other plastics	Polycarbonate (PC), polyamide (PA), styrene acrylonitrile (SAN), acrylic plastics/polyacrylonitrile (PAN)
ABS	Monitor/TV cases, coffee makers, cell phones, calculators, most computer plastic, Lego bricks, certain FFF 3D printed parts
Symbols similar to this are commonly used to represent and encourage recycling	-

== Special disposal sites ==
=== Electronic waste and batteries ===
It is not permissible to dispose of electronic waste (e-waste), such as laptops, cell phones, and printers, at a standard recycling facility, or in regular garbage for collection. e-waste must be taken to specific facilities. Similarly, metros run dedicated battery recycling facilities for safe battery disposal.

Multiple large retail chains, including Pick n Pay and Makro, run their own public e-waste drop-off facilities. Pick n Pay has a partnership with EWaste Africa and the E-Waste Recycling Authority (ERA) to build a nationwide network aimed at making e-waste recycling more accessible. The partnership aims to install around 300 e-waste facilities by 2027. Makro has partnered with DESCO, and, as of mid-2026, operates 19 e-waste drop-off facilities across SA.

=== Other restricted items ===
As an example, the City of Cape Town places restrictions on certain recyclables, including the below.

- Building material: specified drop-off sites, with weight restrictions
- Garden waste: collection for a fee, or special drop-off sites
- Household hazardous items: specified drop-off sites, or private collection by specialized, licensed service providers
- Toner and ink cartridges: refill, return to supplier, or specified drop-off sites
- Paint waste: specified drop-off sites for oil-based, and standard drop-off sites for dry water-based paint
- Used oils: specified drop-off sites
- Tires: retreading, used in asphalt manufacturing, or taken to a tire recycler

Residents are not permitted to burn any type of trash. Disposing of trash in public areas is prohibited.

== Common types of recycling ==
Certain materials are recycled more commonly than others in South Africa. Some are not recycled as regularly due to a lack of suitable recycling facilities.

=== Common ===
- Plastic codes 1 through 3

=== Uncommon ===
- Plastic codes 4 through 7

=== Other ===
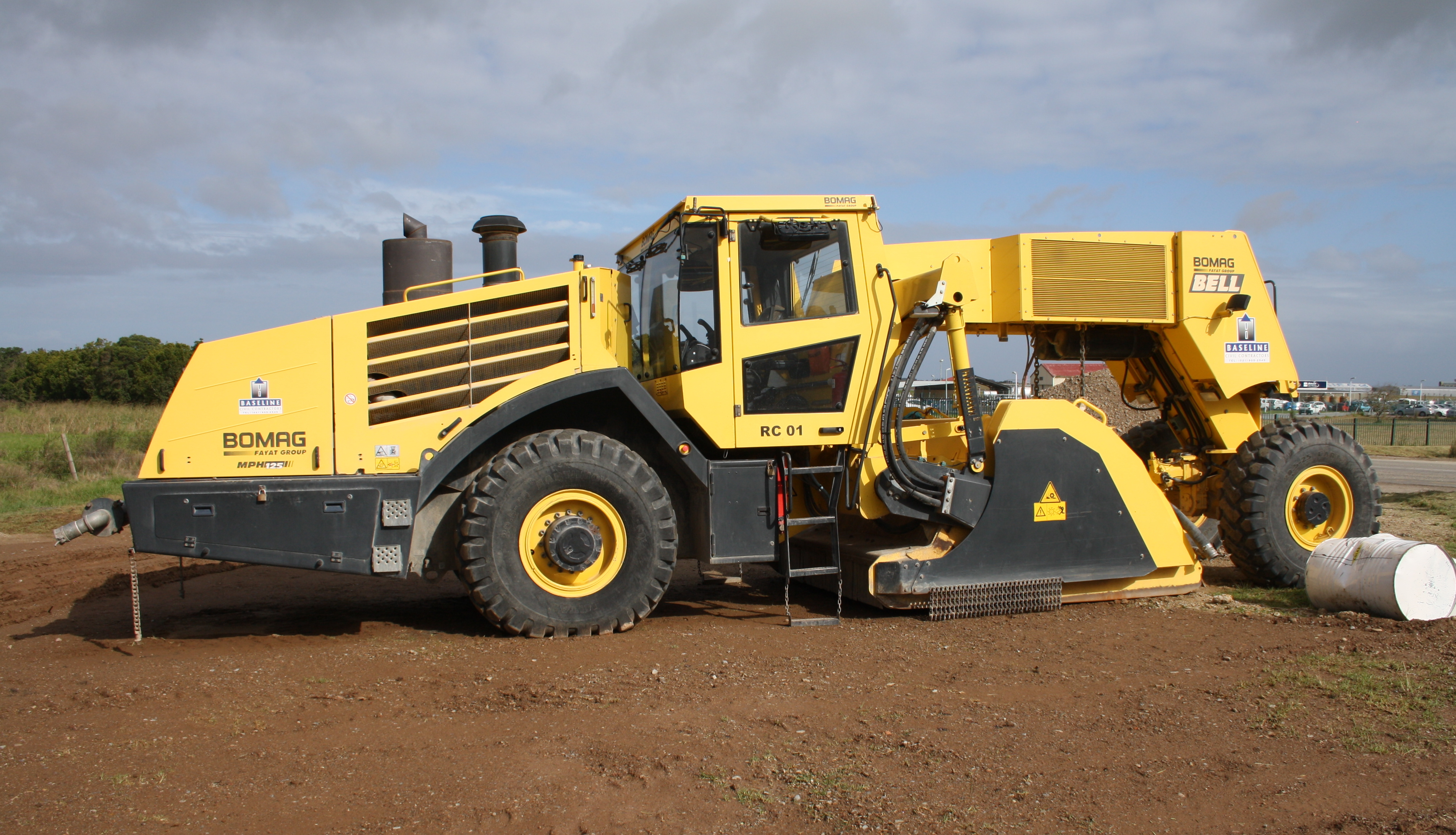
BOMAG MPH125 cold asphalt recycling vehicle

Almost all roads in South Africa are constructed using asphalt. The material is more sustainable than concrete, in that it can be easily ground up and reused to make new roads. South African transit authorities use cold asphalt recycling vehicles for this purpose.

== Recycling by metro ==
=== Cape Town ===
Aside from community-based programs active in Cape Town, the City of Cape Town offers a number of different waste disposal services for recycling. These include:

- Drop-off sites (27 in total)
- Private recycling collection services
- Buy-back centers
- Industrial symbiosis
- Waste exchange

Official city drop-off sites have restrictions around the types and quantity of recycling they accept. Hazardous waste, including e-waste and used oil, has to be delivered to designated sites or collected.

Cape Town also has a free recycling collection program for certain areas, provided users separate their recyclables into dedicated bags.

The City of Cape Town publishes a Recycling Guide for easy sorting, as well as recommendations to reduce the amount of waste that goes to landfill.

The City also publishes a Waste Recyclers Map, for information about private and community drop-off locations, and recycling collectors.

In October 2025, it was announced that Cape Town would get a new food-grade polyethylene terephthalate (PET) plastic recycling plant. The new plant adds 15,000 tons of recycled PET capacity per year to increase total output from 30,000 tons to 45,000 tons.

==== Upcycling ====
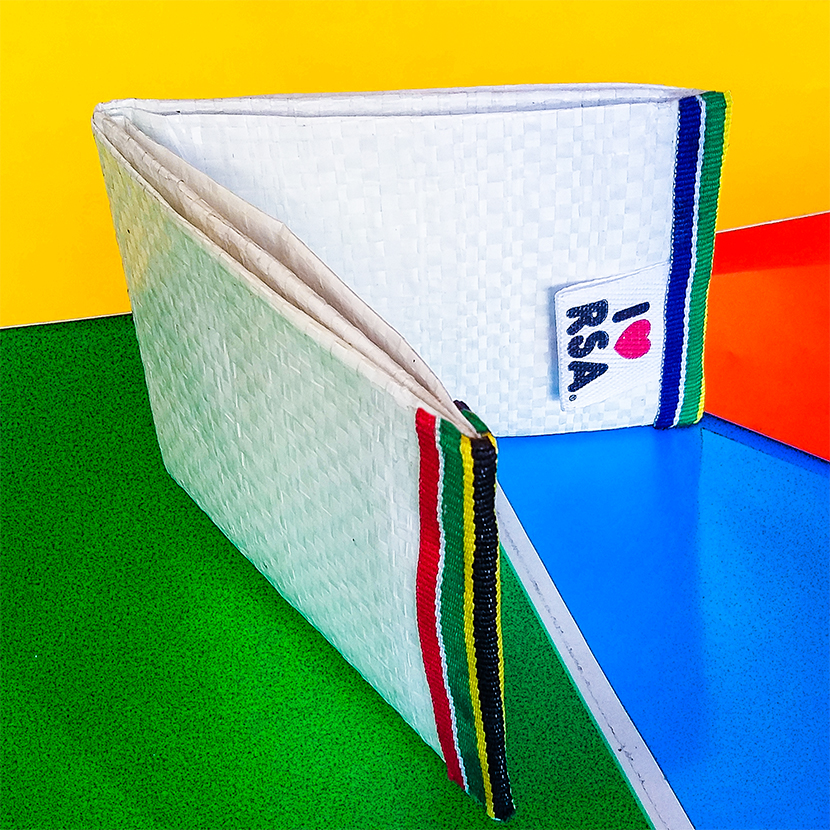
A handmade wallet made from recycled woven plastic bags

The City of Cape Town runs a Waste-To-Art market program, which focuses on turning waste into art, as well as promoting creativity, entrepreneurship, and environmental sustainability. Waste-To-Art market events takes place at various times of the year, hosted at venues including the Company's Garden.

== Annual volume ==
In 2018, around 520,000 tons of plastic was recycled in South Africa. Polyethylene terephthalate (PET) plastic bottles are some of the most recycled products in South Africa. Plastics SA statistics in 2019 showed that South African PET recycling rates were among the highest in the world, and that the country recycled 15% more of the material than most European countries.

Also in 2022, around 1.3 million tons of paper and paper packaging were recycled in South Africa. In the same year, SA's paper recycling input rate (the ratio of collected to recycled materials) was 60.7%.

In 2023, SA recycled 431,800 tons of plastic, with a plastic recycling input rate of 52%. This was an increase from the 368,800 and 42.9% the year before.

As of 2025, around 10% of South Africa's waste is recycled. Over the past 10 years, 11.3 million tons of paper and paper packaging have been recovered for recycling in SA.

== Producers ==
Since 2021, producers of paper and packaging waste, electronic waste, and lighting waste have been required, by law, to take more responsibility for recycling the waste they produce.

Some producers do so via self-administered recycling and waste minimization programs. For others, numerous Producer Responsibility Organizations (PROs) have been established to implement and coordinate their recycling efforts.

== PROs ==
Should they wish to be represented by one, producers need to register with a Producer Responsibility Organizations (PROs), and pay prescribed Extended Producer Responsibility (EPR) fees. PROs subsequently use these fees to invest in the recycling value chain, from separation of recyclables for further processing, to the production of new products from recyclables.

PROs support relevant small medium and micro enterprises (SMMEs) and community-based waste minimization initiatives which meet their targets in terms of the amount of recyclables collected. Examples of waste minimization initiatives are local SMMEs that collect and sort their recyclables, and recycling collection centers organized by local schools.

=== eWASA ===
As a nonprofit Producer Responsibility Organizations (PRO), the EPR Waste Association of South Africa (eWASA) represents some of South Africa's largest producers in the EEE, Lighting, Paper & Packaging Products, Portable Batteries & Lubricant Oils industries. The PRO has been active since 2008.

Member organizations include Toyota, Canon, Amazon Web Services, Jaguar, Italtile, Spar, Clicks Land Rover, Mercedes, Nissan, TFG Limited, Kyocera, Volkswagen, Multichoice, and Samsung.

In 2024, eWasa collected over R800,000 in service fees, and generated R101 million in revenue. The organization engaged with 18 municipalities across 6 provinces, and created 180 new jobs. It collected over 74,000 tons of paper and packaging, and around 13,000 tons of electronic equipment.

== Retailers ==
Certain major local retail chains, such as Checkers and Pick n Pay have adopted their own recycling labelling systems, however not all are equal, and not all packaging is labelled.

Environmentally-conscious major retail chain Woolworths uses its own system of packaging labels that are endorsed by multiple South African industry organizations. It is set to become the standard for packaging in SA.

Woolworths made a commitment that by 2022, all of its packaging would be either recyclable or reusable. The company has also phased out its use of plastic shopping bags, in favor of reusable fabric ones that customers can purchase if they wish to.

== Industry organizations ==
There are numerous organizations working in the South African recycling industry, including PACSA, RecylcePaperZA, Plastics SA, SAPRO, Collect-a-can, The Glass Recycling Company, PETCO, POLYCO, Averda, and Wasteplan.

== Legislation and regulations ==
Regulations pertaining to recycling in South Africa are the responsibility of the Department of Forestry, Fisheries and the Environment (DFFE). The department is headed by the Minister of Forestry, Fisheries and the Environment, a role held since 2024 by Democratic Alliance member Dion George.

As of 2025, the DFFE has an annual budget of R9 billion. The department deals with matters including climate change, biodiversity, nature conservation, waste management, oceans and coasts, environmental programs, and compliance inspections.

The following legislation relates to recycling in South Africa:

A summary of the policies and laws affecting waste management and recycling in South Africa
Legislation	Year enacted	Status	Ref
National Environmental Management: Waste Act	2008	In effect	
National Waste Management Strategy (NWMS)	2020	In effect	
SABS: SANS 1728, Requirements for the marketing and identification of degradable plastics	2019	In effect	

=== Definition of recyclable ===
The South African National Standards (SANS) publishes a definition of "recyclable". SANS is aligned with the International Organization for Standardization (ISO). According to SANS, a recyclable is a material that can be collected, separated, processed, and converted into new materials or products. This is based on three criteria:

- The material must be physically and chemically suitable for recycling.
- Recycling the material must be economically viable
- There must be a market for the recycled material

== See also ==
- Department of Forestry, Fisheries and the Environment
- Environment of South Africa
- Districts of South Africa
- Municipalities of South Africa
- Circular economy
- Doughnut (economic model)
