= Danie Schutte =

South African politician (born 1947)

Minister of Home Affairs
- In office 1993–1994
- President: F. W. de Klerk
- Preceded by: Louis Pienaar
- Succeeded by: Mangosuthu Buthelezi

Personal details
- Born: Daniel Pieter Antonie Schutte; 13 June 1947 (age 79) Pretoria, Transvaal Province; Union of South Africa
- Party: Nasionale Aksie (since 2002)
- Other political affiliations: New National Party; National Party
- Education: Stellenbosch University

Daniel Pieter Antonie "Danie" Schutte (born 13 June 1947) is a South African politician and lawyer who was the last Minister of Home Affairs of the apartheid era from 1993 to 1994. He represented the National Party (NP) both in the apartheid-era House of Assembly and in the post-apartheid National Assembly.

Schutte was the provincial leader of the NP in Natal province from 1993 to 1999. He also played a significant role in the negotiations to end apartheid. Although he retired from Parliament in 1999, he co-founded Nasionale Aksie with Cassie Aucamp in 2002.

== Early life and education ==
Schutte was born on 13 June 1947 in Pretoria in the former Transvaal. He is Afrikaans. He attended Stellenbosch University, where he was a member of the executive committee of the Afrikaanse Studentebond. After graduating, he worked for a period as a state advocate in the attorney-general's office in Pietermaritzburg, but he later entered private practice as a lawyer.

== Early political career ==
A member of the NP, Schutte first joined Parliament in 1977, when he was elected to represent the Pietermaritzburg North constituency in the House of Assembly. He served on-and-off in Parliament from then onwards, serving two non-consecutive terms as representative for Pietermaritzburg North. After the 1989 general election, he was appointed Deputy Minister of Justice in the cabinet of F. W. de Klerk. In that capacity, he was involved in the negotiations to end apartheid and helped draft the 1991 National Peace Accord.

In February 1993, de Klerk appointed Schutte as Minister of Home Affairs – the third incumbent in four years. In that capacity, Schutte was centrally involved in planning the historic 1994 general election, South Africa's first to be held under universal suffrage. He also helped negotiate the agreement that secured the participation of the Inkatha Freedom Party (IFP) in the election. In addition, he became acting provincial leader of the NP's Natal branch after the incumbent, Jurie Mentz, defected to the Inkatha Freedom Party (IFP) in early 1993. He ultimately held that position until 1999.

In a 1995 interview with the Mail & Guardian, Schutte told Mark Gevisser that he did not acknowledge any need to apologise for having served in the government that enforced apartheid:

I was not the architect of this system. I got it. Basically, we are the ones who dismantled it, who moved away from it... I have never been a racist. If anyone can argue with me and tell me I was one, I'd like to know on what grounds.

== Post-apartheid political career ==
In the 1994 general election, Schutte was elected to represent the NP in the new multi-racial National Assembly. He represented the party in the Portfolio Committee on Justice, which during this period held prominent debates about the controversial Truth and Reconciliation Commission. In the committee, he was viewed as "perhaps the most belligerent of the NP backbenchers" and "one of the party's fiercest opponents of the [governing] ANC". Gevisser speculated that he was "positioning himself to take up the reins of the tough 'new right'" of the NP, and he was viewed as a relatively important strategist in the party, alongside Roelf Meyer, Hernus Kriel, and Marthinus van Schalkwyk.

In August 1997, de Klerk announced his retirement, and Schutte was among the first to announce his candidacy to succeed de Klerk as leader of the NP (soon to be relaunched as the NNP). Though Schutte was the most prominent right-wing challenger to the frontrunner, Marthinus van Schalkwyk, the Mail & Guardian observed that he had little support outside Natal and almost none in the party's black caucus. Van Schalkwyk was ultimately elected to the position.

In October 1999, Schutte announced that he intended to resign from politics to work in farming full-time. The following month, he declined to stand for re-election as NNP provincial leader, and Renier Schoeman was elected to succeed him. He left his parliamentary seat on 31 January 2000, ceding his seat to Adriaan Blaas.

=== Nasionale Aksie ===
However, in June 2002, Schutte returned to the public eye when he was elected as co-leader of Nasionale Aksie, a new political party he had founded with Cassie Aucamp. The party aimed explicitly to represent Afrikaner interests. Schutte said that he had chosen to return to politics because he believed that South Africa "needed a new clean party". However, the party did not win any seats in the 2004 general election.

== Personal life ==
He is married to Alphia, who was a local politician in Pietermaritzburg, and has four children.
