= Adriaan Blaas =

South African politician

Member of the National Assembly
- In office 1 February 2000 – April 2004
- Constituency: KwaZulu-Natal
- In office May 1994 – June 1999

Personal details
- Citizenship: South Africa
- Party: African Christian Democratic Party (since 2003)
- Other political affiliations: New National Party (1997–2003); National Party (until 1997)

Adriaan Blaas is a South African politician who served in the National Assembly from 1994 to 2004. He represented the National Party (NP) and New National Party (NNP) until April 2003, when he crossed the floor to join the African Christian Democratic Party (ACDP).

== Legislative career ==
Blaas was first elected to the National Assembly in the 1994 general election, representing the NP (later restyled as the NNP). He was not immediately re-elected in the 1999 general election, but he was sworn in to an NNP seat on 1 February 2000, filling the casual vacancy that had arisen after Danie Schutte resigned; he represented the KwaZulu-Natal constituency.

He sat on the Standing Committee on Public Accounts until April 2002, when he was replaced by Francois Beukman (who was then elected chairman). Thereafter he served as the NNP's spokesman on defence.

During the 2003 floor-crossing window, Blaas announced that he had resigned from the NNP to join the ACDP for "predominately personal reasons". He said in a statement:

Suffice to say that I could not serve the NNP with the commitment and dedication that is required. The ACDP is a fresh party that grew out of a new South African context, and their Christian principles and policies allow me to take a public stand compatible with my own value framework.

He served as the ACDP's spokesman on finance and left Parliament after the 2004 general election.
