= Cassie Aucamp =

South African politician

Member of the National Assembly
- In office June 1999 – April 2004

Personal details
- Born: Casperus Aucamp; 10 December 1950 (age 75)
- Citizenship: South Africa
- Party: Nasionale Aksie (since 2001)
- Other political affiliations: Afrikaner Eenheidsbeweging (until 2003)
- Children: Willie Aucamp

Casperus "Cassie" Aucamp (born 10 December 1950) is a retired South African politician and former Christian minister who was the inaugural leader of the Afrikaner Eenheidsbeweging (AEB) and later the inaugural leader of Nasionale Aksie (NA). He served in the National Assembly from 1999 to 2004.

Aucamp entered politics as the leader of AEB during the party's campaign in the 1999 general election. However, by the end of 2001, Aucamp had established an alternative political group, NA, which he co-founded with Danie Schutte and which differed from AEB in soliciting a multi-racial membership. Although his dual party affiliations caused tensions in AEB, he retained the leadership of AEB until March 2003, when he officially resigned from the party and crossed the floor to NA. NA did not win any seats in the National Assembly in the general election of the following year, and Aucamp was therefore ejected from Parliament.

== Early life and career ==
Aucamp was born on 10 December 1950. Before entering politics, he was a minister in the Reformed Church in Thabazimbi in Limpopo; before that, he was an insurance broker. He became a professional politician ahead of the 1999 general election, when he became the inaugural leader of the newly launched Afrikaner Eenheidsbeweging (AEB; Afrikaans for Afrikaner Unity Movement).

== Legislative career ==
=== Afrikaner Eenheidsbeweging: 1999–2003 ===
Aucamp represents conservative Afrikaner interests. But human beings are not like stones. We sit next to each other. He melts your heart with his jokes. He is a very funny man. He is a minister of the church, but he is very naughty. At a personal level, he is a nice man.

— Mosibudi Mangena of the Azanian People's Organisation, who shared a bench with Aucamp in the National Assembly

In the 1999 election, Aucamp was elected as AEB's sole representative in the National Assembly. His policy priority in the assembly was to push for constitutional change to protect the rights and freedoms of cultural and political minorities. Though the AEB was small and highly conservative, he denied that it was a right-wing party, saying that the term was outdated and that the AEB was "part of mainstream politics". Although much of the house disagreed with his political platform, the Mail & Guardian said that he was "the funniest man in Parliament" and well-liked by his peers.

==== Formation of Nasionale Aksie ====
In December 2001, Aucamp and Danie Schutte, a former MP of the National Party, announced that the formation of a new political party called Nasionale Aksie (NA; Afrikaans for National Action) which, in Aucamp's words, would not be "ashamed to say that we will specifically support the interests of the Afrikaner". Aucamp and Schutte, who said that the union was the result of four years of negotiation, were installed as the party's inaugural co-leaders. At the party's official launch in Pretoria in June 2002, Aucamp said that he could remain a dual member of the AEB and NA by means of a cooperation agreement between the parties.

However, by then, Parliament had launched legislation to allow floor-crossing during designated periods. Indeed, Aucamp had famously nicknamed those affected by the law as "crosstitutes", a play on Motsoko Pheko's warning that, "A constitution is not a key to open a bedroom to take political prostitutes to bed." At NA's launch, Aucamp said that he hoped to cross the floor from AEB to NA under the new legislation.

==== Suspension ====
In announcing his intention to leave the AEB, Aucamp had, in News24's phrase, "jumped the gun", because the 2002 floor-crossing law was declared invalid by a court. Unprotected by the law, Aucamp faced a challenge from the right wing of the AEB – dominated by former members of the Conservative Party – who opposed cooperation between AEB and NA, primarily on the grounds that NA, unlike AEB, was open to non-white members. Although Aucamp managed to retain the leadership of the AEB, his party membership was suspended at an AEB council meeting in February 2003. His suspension was apparently orchestrated by the party's right, who also elected Werner Weber as AEB's new leader and parliamentary representative.

Aucamp launched an urgent court challenge on the grounds that the council meeting had not been properly constituted. The court ruled in his favour in early March. Immediately after the court judgement was handed down – entailing that he remained AEB leader and retained AEB's sole parliamentary seat – he reiterated his intention to cross the floor to NA as soon as floor-crossing legislation came into effect.

=== Nasionale Aksie: 2003–2004 ===
In the May 2003 floor-crossing window, the first such window in the South African Parliament, Aucamp resigned from AEB and formally established NA as a parliamentary party, with him as its sole representative in the National Assembly. He served the rest of the parliamentary term under the NA banner.

Aucamp said that despite the party's focus on Afrikaner and Christian interests, anyone who supported its principles was welcome to join. According to the Mail & Guardian, the party attracted a support base among Afrikaans academics, politicians, and youths who wanted a mainstream Afrikaans party; its main bases were in Gauteng, Limpopo, and the North West. The party's platform in the 2004 general election endorsed a market economy and supported the phased elimination of affirmative action.

==== 2004 election ====
When the 2004 election was held, NA did not win any seats in the National Assembly, meaning that Aucamp would lose his seat. He said that he was surprised and unhappy with the results of the election and believed that many of the party's supporters had decided to vote for the Independent Democrats; he compared NA to "the Free State rugby team – everybody's second choice". Asked what he would do next, he joked that he would prefer to beg on a street corner than to join the Freedom Front Plus.

== Personal life ==
Aucamp's son is politician Willie Aucamp. He introduced Willie to Carol Johnson, who became Willie's wife.
