= 1999 South African presidential election =

- 14 June 1999

400 votes in the National Assembly 201 votes needed to win
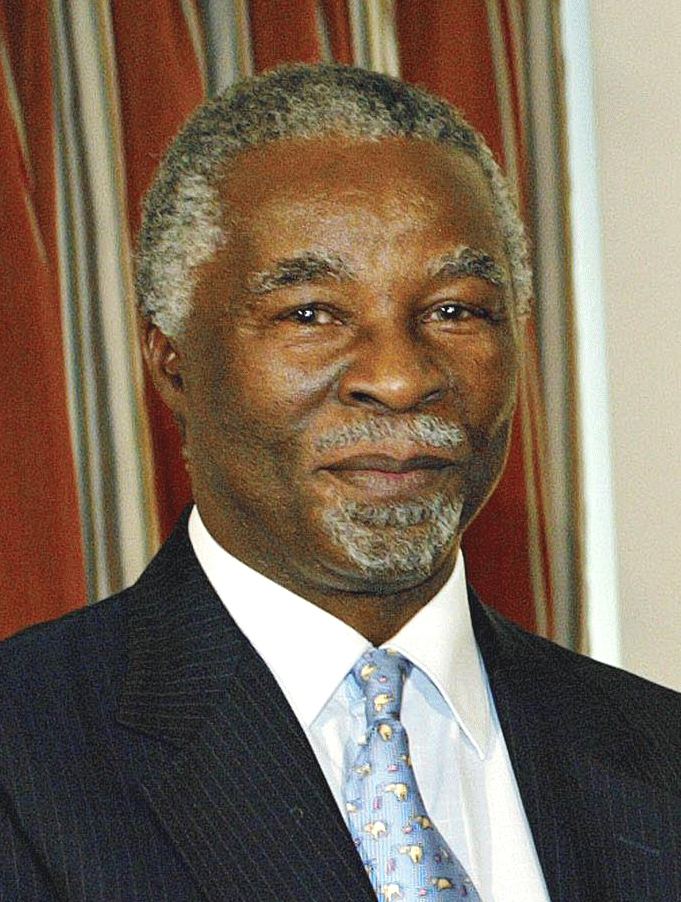
Nominee	Thabo Mbeki
Party	ANC
Electoral vote	Unopposed
President before election
Nelson Mandela
ANC
Elected President
Thabo Mbeki
ANC

An indirect presidential election was held in South Africa on 14 June 1999. This came as a result of the 2 June 1999 general election which saw the African National Congress (ANC) receive and increased majority of 66.65%. This is more than enough to comfortably elect a president and form a government. This was also the first election held after the introduction of the 1996 constitution.

== Election ==
On 14 June 1999, the National Assembly saw the nomination of incumbent Deputy President Thabo Mbeki for president. He was subsequently elected unopposed as the second president of the Republic of South Africa.
