= Jan de Villiers =

South African politician (born 1980)

Jan Naudé de Villiers MP

National Spokesperson of the Democratic Alliance
- Incumbent
- Assumed office 17 November 2025 Serving with Karabo Khakhau
- Preceded by: Willie Aucamp

Member of the National Assembly of South Africa
- Incumbent
- Assumed office 22 May 2019

Personal details
- Born: Jan Naudé de Villiers; 6 March 1980 (age 46)
- Party: Democratic Alliance
- Profession: Politician

Jan Naudé de Villiers (born 6 March 1980) is a South African politician who has served in the National Assembly of South Africa for the Democratic Alliance since 2019. He was elected to chair the Portfolio Committee on Public Service and Administration in July 2024. He was named National Spokesperson of the Democratic Alliance in November 2025. Within the DA's Shadow Cabinet, he held the posts of Shadow Minister on the Auditor-General and as Shadow Minister of Small Business Development.

== Education ==
De Villiers holds a Bachelor of Arts in humanity studies from the University of Stellenbosch.

== Political career ==
Prior to his election to parliament, De Villiers was a DA councillor and a member of the mayoral committee in the Stellenbosch Local Municipality.

De Villiers stood as a DA parliamentary candidate from the Western Cape in the 2019 national elections, and was subsequently elected to the National Assembly and sworn in on 22 May 2019. On 5 June 2019, he was appointed by the DA parliamentary leader, Mmusi Maimane, as Shadow Minister of the Auditor-General, succeeding Alan McLoughlin, who retired from parliament. Later that month, he became a member of the Standing Committee on Auditor-General.

Maimane resigned as DA leader in October 2019 and John Steenhuisen was voted in as his interim successor in November 2019. He temporarily retained Maimane's shadow cabinet. After Steenhuisen was elected leader for a full term at the 2020 Democratic Alliance Federal Congress, he announced his Shadow Cabinet on 5 December 2020, in which De Villiers was appointed as Shadow Minister of Small Business Development, succeeding Zakhele Mbhele. On 7 December, he became a member of the Portfolio Committee on Small Business Development.

In the 2020 Register of Members’ Interests, de Villiers declared that he was a director of two property investment companies. He also disclosed that he was a co-owner of the Eikestad Mall in Stellenbosch and has the benefit of free parking at the shopping centre.

Having been re-elected to Parliament in the 2024 general election, he was elected to chair the Portfolio Committee on Public Service and Administration in July 2024.

De Villiers was appointed as a spokesperson of the Democratic Alliance in November 2025, following Willie Aucamp's appointment to cabinet.
