= Draft South Africa National Artificial Intelligence (AI) Policy 2026 =

Parliament of South Africa
- Long title: To develop a comprehensive, inclusive, and ethically grounded national AI policy that ensures responsible innovation, protects public interest, and advances social and economic transformation, by enabling safe and secure adoption of AI technologies, while safeguarding rights and aligning with national values and international norms.
- Citation: Draft South Africa National Artificial Intelligence (AI) Policy (PDF).
- Considered by: Department of Communications and Digital Technologies
- Abrogated: 27 April 2026
- White paper: AI National Government Summit Discussion Document (PDF).; South Africa National AI Policy Framework (PDF).;
- Status: Halted

The Draft South Africa National Artificial Intelligence Policy, 2026 was a national policy published by the Department of Communications and Digital Technologies (DCDT) under Section 85(2)(b), aimed at proving foundational guidelines for the safe and secure adoption of Artificial Intelligence technologies across all public and private sectors in South Africa in the short term, with the explicit intention of evolving into a national law that governs and enforces AI adoption through new regulatory bodies envisaged in the draft policy.

The policy was published for public comment on 10 April 2026, and subsequently withdrawn by Minister Solly Malatsi of the Department of Communications and Digital Technologies on 26 April 2026, following a scandal involving the inclusion of fake, AI-hallucinated citations in its reference list.

== Background ==
The process began with a National AI Summit convened by then Minister Mondli Gungubele on 5 April 2024, to share the contents of a draft National AI Plan with key stakeholders and the Information and Communication Technology (ICT) industry. This was a pre-policy process that is intended to collate stakeholder inputs and incorporate them into the draft plan before it being taken through the Cabinet System for release for public comments.

Following the AI Summit, a National AI Policy Framework published in August 2024, and received 32 submissions. On 24 February 2026, the DCDT briefed Parliament and confirmed the full draft had cleared the Socio-Economic Impact Assessment System and achieved concurrence across all Director-General clusters. Cabinet formally approved the draft for publication for public comment on 25 March 2026. The final draft AI policy was published in the Government Gazette (Notice 3880 of 2026) on 10 April 2026. under Section 85(2)(b) of the Constitution which allows the executive to develop and implement national policy.

Minister Solly Malatsi withdrew the draft policy, after confirming that the policy contained various fictitious sources in its reference list. The minister noted that inclusion of unverified fictitious citations was not a mere technical issue but had compromised the integrity and credibility of the draft policy.

== Provisions of the policy ==
=== Core Vision and Objectives ===
The policy’s central vision is "AI for inclusive economic growth, job creation, cost reduction, and a developing Africa". Its primary objectives include:

- Strengthening AI-related education and skills through STEAM-focused curricula and community AI centers.
- Enhancing public service delivery and supporting startups through regulatory sandboxes and accelerators.
- Establishing localized ethical standards that align with international norms while addressing South Africa's historical inequalities.
- Preserving cultural heritage by using AI to digitize and translate all 12 official languages.
- Develop responsible, human-centred AI tools for rural development, healthcare, public services, and education, especially in indigenous languages.

The implementation of this policy requires a whole-of-government approach, in conjunction with new sector-specific working groups to develop implementation roadmaps in manufacturing, energy, infrastructure, transport and trade, and other such sectors where the need for specific responses are identified.

=== Strategic Pillars ===
The strategic pillars of this AI Policy are the fundamental components or key areas of focus that support and drive the implementation of the policy’s goals and objectives. They serve as the core framework around which the policy is structured, providing clear guidance and direction for its development. The six strategic pillars intended to support responsible and ethical AI development and deployment are:

1. Talent/Capacity development: This strategic pillar focuses on strengthening South Africa’s AI-driven innovation economy through investment in AI research, Centres of Excellence, startup accelerators, and advanced digital technologies, while promoting collaboration between government, academia, and industry to support local innovation, sector-specific AI adoption, entrepreneurship, open data, regulatory sandboxes, and inclusive funding mechanisms for startups and micro, small, and medium enterprises (MSMEs).
2. AI for Inclusive Growth and Job Creation: This pillar aims to advance technological capabilities and drive innovation, through investment in AI research, Centres of Excellence. It also aims to ensure startups and MSMEs effectively leverage AI technologies by providing access to inclusive funding mechanisms for startup accelerators, Non-private/non-regulated open data, regulatory sandboxes that encourage innovation.
3. Responsible AI governance: This pillar aims to protect citizens and infrastructure through strengthened AI cybersecurity, transparent data governance, and regulatory alignment with South African laws to ensure safe, accountable, and sovereign AI systems in both domestic and cross-border AI systems.
4. Ethical and inclusive AI: This pillar aims to reduce AI bias and promote inclusive, African-centred AI development through rights-based, risk-based regulation that enables diverse datasets, ethical oversight, human rights assessments, disability inclusion, local language preservation, and strengthened regional and global cooperation on AI governance, standards, and innovation.
5. Cultural preservation and international integration: This pillar seeks to ensure that AI development reflects South Africa’s societal values through a human-centred and culturally inclusive approach grounded in Ubuntu, promoting social justice, indigenous language preservation, stakeholder participation, and equitable access to essential services. It also aims to strengthen South Africa’s position as a regional AI leader through international collaboration, interoperable governance systems, public-private partnerships, and cross-border data and infrastructure cooperation, while safeguarding local economic interests, labour protections, and data justice.
6. Human-centred deployment: This pillar aims to ensure responsible and human-centred AI governance through meaningful human oversight, ethical safeguards, transparency, and accountability in AI decision-making, particularly in high-risk and public-sector applications. It seeks to strengthen public trust by promoting explainable and contestable AI systems, improving algorithmic accountability, bias detection, and compliance with South African data protection laws, while also enhancing government efficiency and public service delivery through the ethical adoption of AI in sectors such as healthcare, education, urban planning, and national security.

=== Institutional Infrastructure ===
The policy proposed the creation of several new regulatory and oversight bodies:

- National AI Commission (National AI Office): A dedicated, standalone central nerve-center to coordinate refinement, development and monitor progress of implementation of the AI Policy. The policy envisions this office to either be a section 3 public entity or independent Non-Profit Company with partial public funding.
- AI Ethics Board: To enforce ethical governance and address bias and fairness. The board shall incorporate inputs from companies based ethics boards in ongoing reviews of guidelines. The policy envisions this board to either be a section 3 public entity or independent Non-Profit Company with partial public funding.
- AI Regulatory Authority: To perform audits, monitor compliance, and issue certifications. The policy does not prescribe the structure of this entity.
- AI Ombudsperson Office: To allow citizens to challenge AI-driven decisions and seek redress.
- AI Insurance Superfund: Modelled after the Road Accident Fund to compensate individuals or entities harmed by AI-driven outcomes where liability is unclear. This fund would provide a safety net in cases where liability is difficult to determine, especially for systems operating in ambiguous decision-making spaces.
- National AI Safety Institute: To collaborate with international bodies to advance AI safety science and develop, update, and share AI safety guidelines.
- Integrated AI-Powered Monitoring Centre: To serve as a central hub to monitor and improve efficiency across government and societal service delivery systems. The policy does not define the form and structure of this centre.

=== Regulatory Approach and Implementation ===
The policy advocates for a risk-based approach (inspired by the EU AI Act), categorizing AI systems by their level of potential harm and imposing stricter regulations on high-risk applications. It envisioned a three-year phased implementation roadmap:

- Year 1 (2025/26): Finalizing the policy and addressing "unacceptable risks".
- Year 2 (2026/27): Publishing guidelines and adopting sectoral AI strategies.
- Year 3 (2027/28): Full implementation of all remaining policy interventions.

== Withdrawal and consequence management ==
On 25 April 2026, Khusela Diko, the chairperson of the parliamentary Portfolio Committee on Communications and Digital Technologies publicly called for the Minister of to withdraw the policy on an X post, after which the minister publicly withdrew the draft policy the next day. Four unnamed officials, one them being the chief director, were suspended pending internal investigation into the inclusion of fictitious citations. Two independent law firms were appointed to manage the disciplinary process and review policy documents. .

== Reaction and critique ==
- Legal and policy commentators have argued that the policy framework contained structural and institutional limitations, including a lack of clearly assigned regulatory responsibilities, limited detail on cross-sectorial coordination, and insufficient clarity regarding implementation platforms and funding mechanisms. They also noted that the framework provides limited discussion of internet affordability challenges in rural areas, labour protections in the context of AI-driven economic change, risks of market concentration by large technology firms, geopolitical dependencies on foreign AI infrastructure and hardware, and mechanisms for retaining domestic AI talent.
- Dr. Alexandre Essome the co-chair of the Centre for Artificial Intelligence and Sustainable Development(CAISD) views the withdrawal of the draft policy as a necessary act of accountability following "AI-generated hallucinations". Despite the scandal, Essome argues the policy's Ubuntu-based philosophy and unique ideas, like the AI Insurance Superfund, are worth rescuing. He further argued that South Africa should adopt a "Development-First" framework. This means using AI to fix administrative backlogs and improve healthcare while strictly regulating specific harms like algorithmic bias in lending or grant denials.
