= Afrikaner Eenheidsbeweging =

Small South African political party founded in Pretoria in 1998

The Afrikaner Eenheidsbeweging (Afrikaner Unity Movement) was a small South African political party founded in Pretoria in 1998. It was led by Cassie Aucamp, and based on Afrikaner nationalism. The party participated in the South African general election of 1999, in which it gained one member elected to the National Assembly. In September 2003, shortly before the 2004 election, the AEB merged with two likeminded parties, the Conservative Party and the Freedom Front, to form a new party known as the Freedom Front Plus (FF +), which went on to win 4 parliamentary seats.

Aucamp, who disagreed with the merger, defected with the party's only seat in the 2003 floor crossing period to form a new party called Nasionale Aksie.

== Election results ==
=== National elections ===
| Election | Votes | % | Seats |
|---|---|---|---|
| 1999 | 46,292 | 0.29 | 1 |
