= Dion George =

South African politician

The Honourable Dion George MP
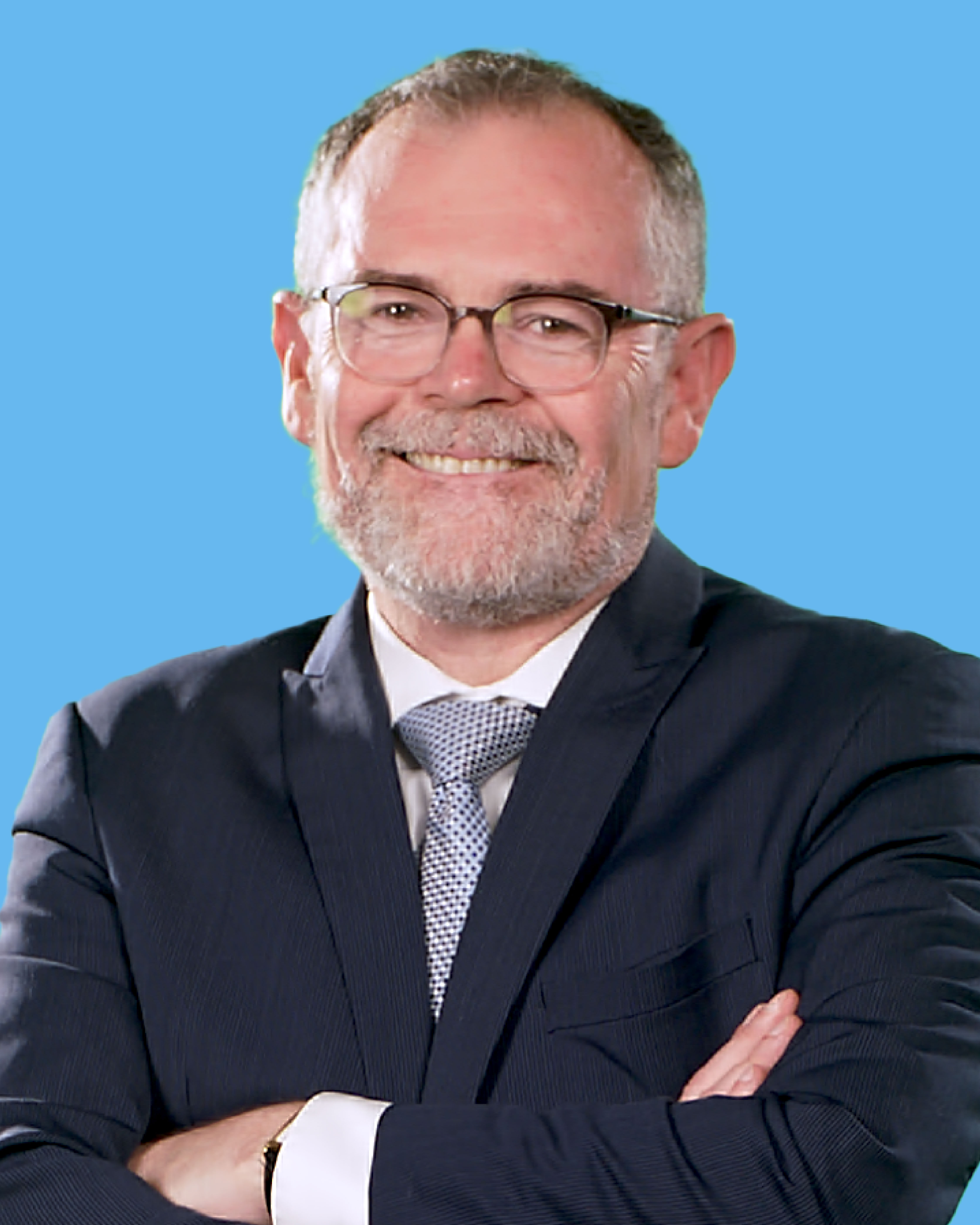
- George in 2024

Minister of Forestry, Fisheries and the Environment
- In office 3 July 2024 – 12 November 2025
- President: Cyril Ramaphosa
- Deputy: Narend Singh; Bernice Swarts
- Preceded by: Barbara Creecy
- Succeeded by: Willie Aucamp

Member of the National Assembly
- In office 22 May 2019 – 15 January 2026
- In office 15 January 2008 – 1 June 2015

Permanent Delegate to the National Council of Provinces

Assembly Member for Western Cape
- In office 15 November 2018 – 7 May 2019

Personal details
- Born: Dion Travers George; 26 May 1966 (age 60) Durban, Natal Province; South Africa
- Citizenship: South African; United States
- Party: Democratic Alliance
- Education: University of the Witwatersrand; University of South Africa

Dion Travers George (born 26 May 1966) is a South African politician who served as the Minister of Environment, Forestry and Fisheries from July 2024 to November 2025. He was a Member of Parliament for the Democratic Alliance (DA) until January 2026.

After a career in the financial services industry, George entered party politics in 2005 when he was elected as chairman of the DA's branch in Sandown, Sandton, an upscale suburb of Johannesburg. Following two years in the Johannesburg City Council, he joined Parliament in January 2008 and became the DA's Shadow Minister of Finance in May 2009.

He served in the National Assembly from 2008 to 2015 and in the National Council of Provinces from 2018 to 2019, with a hiatus in the private sector between 2015 and 2018. He returned to the National Assembly in the May 2019 general election and joined the cabinet after the May 2024 general election, when the DA formed a coalition government with the African National Congress.

George was the DA's federal finance chairperson from April 2018 to January 2026. He formerly held the same office between 2010 and 2015.

== Early life and career ==
Dion was born on 26 May 1966 in Durban. During his childhood he moved to Vanderbijlpark, where he completed high school. Thereafter he moved to Johannesburg to enroll in the University of the Witwatersrand, where he completed a BA.

After completing his undergraduate degree and compulsory service in the South African Defence Force, he worked in the financial services industry in Johannesburg. He also received an honours degree in industrial and organisational psychology at the University of South Africa (Unisa), an MBA from Wits, and a doctor of business leadership from Unisa.

Meanwhile, he joined the Democratic Party, later the Democratic Alliance (DA), in 1995, and in 2005 he was elected chairman of the DA's Sandown branch in the suburb of Sandton. After the March 2006 local elections, he joined the City of Johannesburg council as a proportional-representation councillor for the DA.

== Parliamentary opposition ==
=== Shadow cabinet: 2008–2015 ===
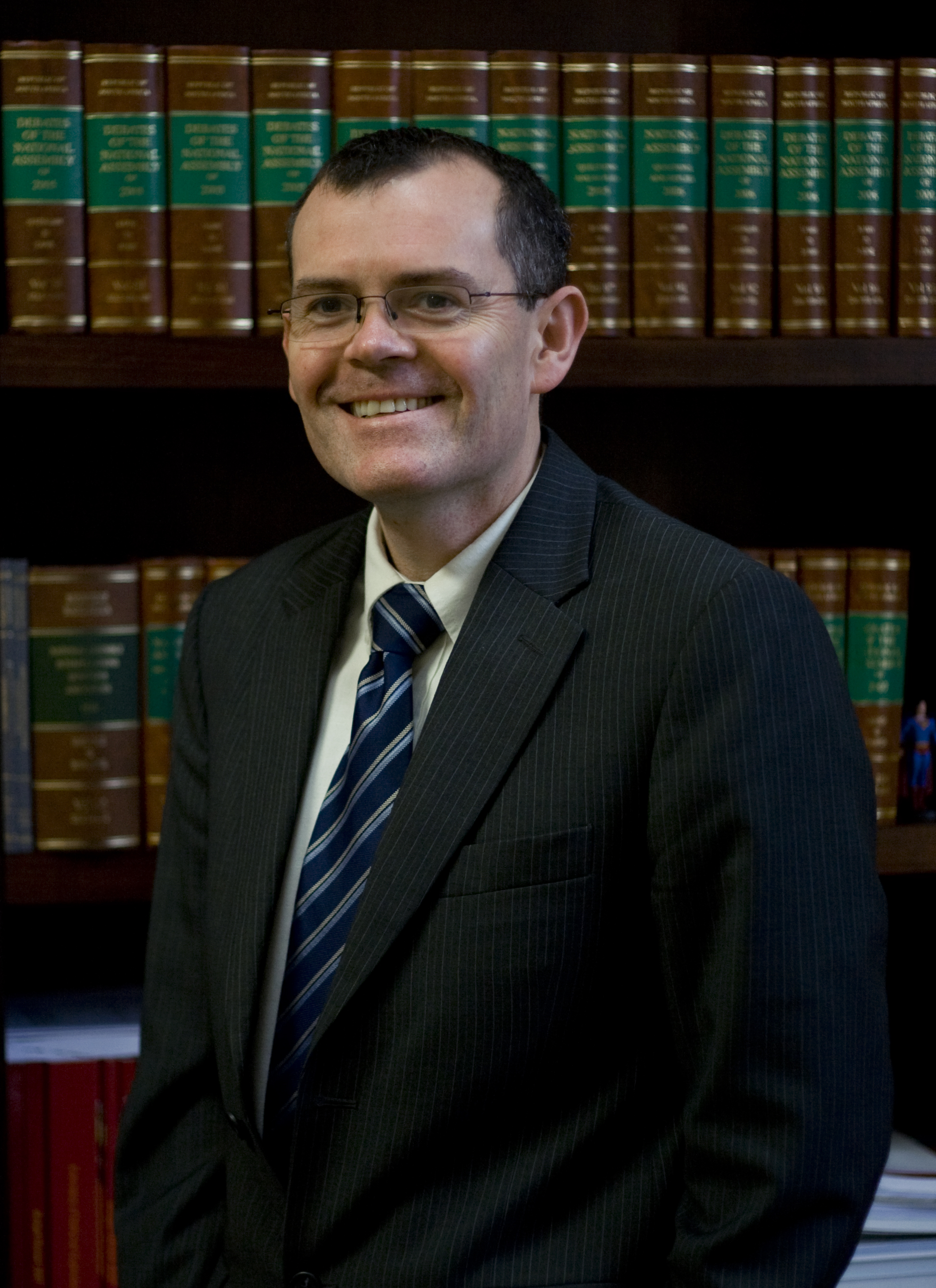
George in July 2009

On 15 January 2008, George was sworn in to a DA seat in the National Assembly, the lower house of the South African Parliament. He filled the casual vacancy that arose after Douglas Gibson resigned from his seat to become an ambassador. George was elected to full terms in the seat in the April 2009 general election and May 2014 general election. He was appointed as Shadow Minister of Finance after the 2009 election, in Atholl Trollip's shadow cabinet, and he retained that position in Mmusi Maimane's shadow cabinet from 2014. The DA also named him as its constituency contact in Sandton North and Midrand.

In addition, for much of this period Dion served as the DA's federal finance chairperson. He was first elected to that office in 2010 and gained re-election at the party's November 2012 congress, prevailing in a contest against Alf Lees. However, when the DA's next federal congress was called in 2015, George did not stand for re-election; instead, Lees was elected to succeed him at the conference in May 2015.

On 1 June 2015, George resigned his seat in the National Assembly, ceding it to Brandon Topham. David Maynier took over his portfolio in the shadow cabinet.

=== National Council of Provinces: 2018–2019 ===
After his resignation, George returned to his private-sector career in finance. However, he reverted to politics before the end of that parliamentary term. In April 2018, he attended the DA's federal congress, where he was elected to return as federal finance chairperson, defeating Alf Lees's re-election bid. Thereafter, on 15 November 2018, he was sworn in to a seat in the upper house of Parliament, the National Council of Provinces, where he filled a casual vacancy in the DA caucus. He was appointed as the DA's constituency contact in Beaufort West.

=== Return to the National Assembly: 2019–2024 ===
In the next general election in May 2019, George was elected to return to the National Assembly. He appointed as Shadow Deputy Minister of Finance, deputising Geordin Hill-Lewis, and he also served as the DA's constituency contact in Knysna. He retained his position as DA federal finance chairperson, gaining re-election uncontested at the party's federal congresses in October 2020 and April 2023.

== National executive ==
George was re-elected to his parliamentary seat in the May 2024 general election, and, in line with the coalition agreement reached between the DA and African National Congress (ANC), President Cyril Ramaphosa appointed him as Minister of Forestry, Fisheries and the Environment. Narend Singh of the IFP and Bernice Swarts of the ANC were appointed as his deputies.

After his appointment was announced, George promised that he would not be an "extremist" in the portfolio and undertook to "continue the good work" of his predecessor, Barbara Creecy of the ANC. He said that his priority as minister would be climate finance and the just transition to a low-carbon economy. He also declared his interest in investigating how the environment portfolio could contribute to economic growth, especially in areas like coal-generating Mpumalanga that faced economic risks from decarbonisation.

Later in 2024, George attended COP29 in Baku as a member of the South African delegation; he also co-chaired the conference's mitigation track, with his Norwegian counterpart Tore O. Sandvik.

On 12 November 2025, while attending COP30 in Belem, Brazil, George was sacked from the national executive and replaced with DA spokesman Willie Aucamp, following a request from DA leader John Steenhuisen.

On 21 November 2025, George announced that he would be suing for defamation. When news of his impending dismissal first leaked, concerns were raised by environmental groups, supportive of George's stance against captive hunting, and wary of his replacement Willie Aucamp's link with organised hunting groups. Shortly after, a flurry of articles about alleged misconduct and other charges appeared in the media. George denied the claims, and stated that he believed he was fired because of his stand against illicit wildlife trafficking.

George resigned his position as Chairperson of Federal Finance, as a Member of Parliament, and from the DA, in January 2026.

He subsequently founded the Conservation Trust, an NGO focused on combating the illegal wildlife trade.

== Personal life ==
George is gay and married. He was widowered in January 2019 when his late husband Michael died from complications arising from a traumatic brain injury he survived in 2011. He married Craig in September 2020.

In November 2025, George confirmed that he also holds United States citizenship and that he used his American passport for official trips to the US as required by legislation.

Political offices
| Preceded by Kobus Marais | South African Shadow Minister of Finance; 2009–2015 | Succeeded by David Maynier |
