= Solly Malatsi =

South African politician (born 1985)

The Honourable Solly Malatsi
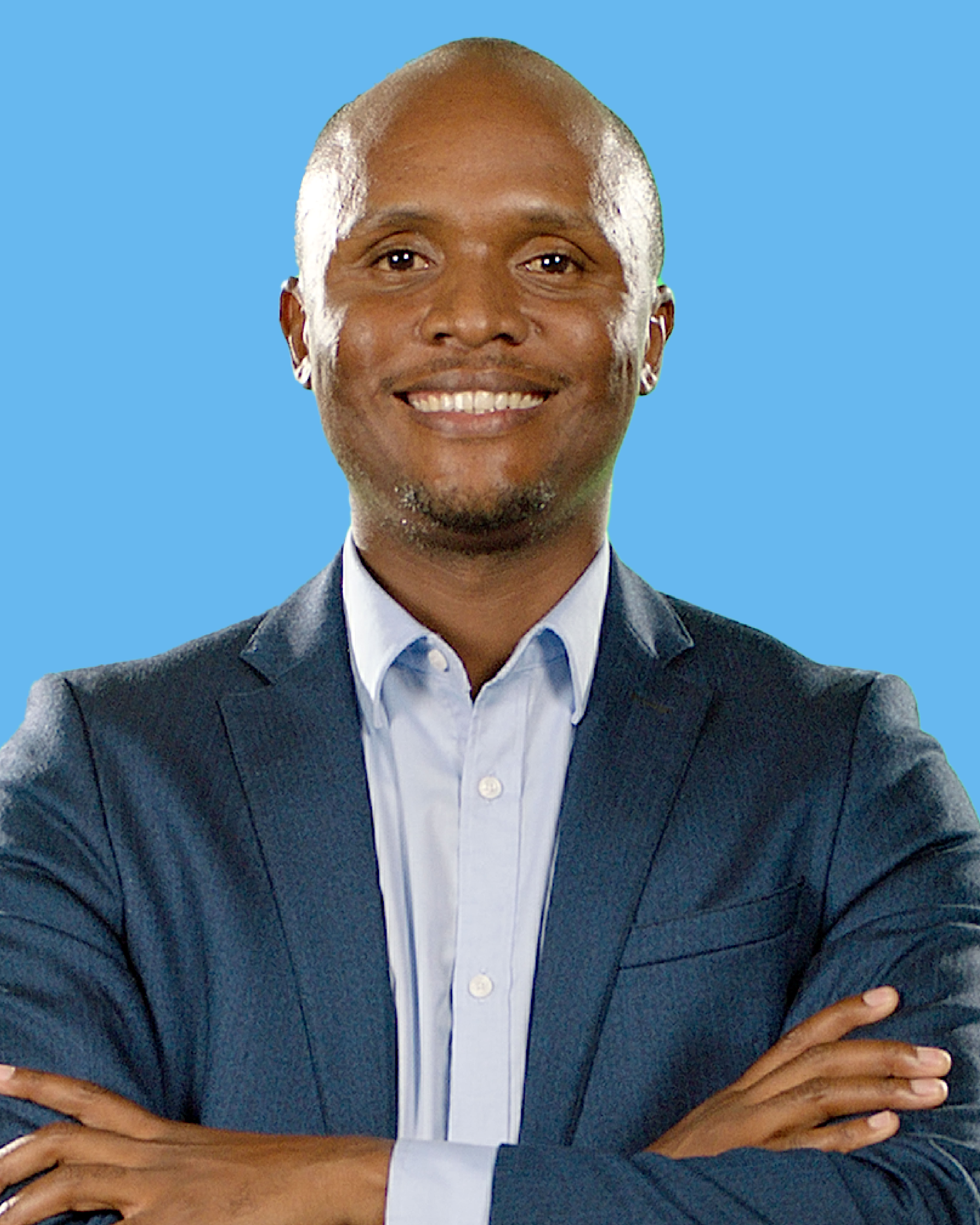

Minister of Communications and Digital Technologies
- Incumbent
- Assumed office 3 July 2024
- President: Cyril Ramaphosa
- Deputy: Mondli Gungubele
- Preceded by: Mondli Gungubele

Deputy Federal Chairperson of the Democratic Alliance
- Incumbent
- Assumed office 2 April 2023 Serving with Siviwe Gwarube and Cilliers Brink
- Leader: John Steenhuisen
- Chairperson: Ivan Meyer

National Spokesperson of the Democratic Alliance
- In office 18 August 2022 – 15 July 2024
- Leader: John Steenhuisen; Mmusi Maimane
- Preceded by: Siviwe Gwarube
- Succeeded by: Karabo Khakhau
- In office 15 June 2018 – 24 November 2020
- Preceded by: Phumzile van Damme
- Succeeded by: Siviwe Gwarube; Willie Aucamp

Shadow Minister in the Presidency
- In office 5 December 2020 – 14 June 2024
- Deputy: Joe McGluwa
- Leader: John Steenhuisen
- Preceded by: Sej Motau

Shadow Minister of Human Settlements
- In office 5 June 2014 – 5 December 2020
- Deputy: Mbulelo Bara
- Leader: John Steenhuisen; Annelie Lotriet (acting); Mmusi Maimane
- Preceded by: Stevens Mokgalapa

Member of the National Assembly of South Africa
- Incumbent
- Assumed office 21 May 2014
- Constituency: Limpopo

Personal details
- Born: Mmoba Solomon Malatsi; 22 December 1985 (age 40) Ga-Dikgale, Transvaal, South Africa
- Party: Democratic Alliance
- Education: University of Limpopo; University of the Witwatersrand
- Profession: Politician

Mmoba Solomon "Solly" Malatsi (born 22 December 1985) is a South African politician who is currently serving as Minister of Communications and Digital Technologies in the Government of National Unity (GNU) since July 2024. He has been a Member of the National Assembly of South Africa since May 2014. He has served in the national leadership of the Democratic Alliance (DA) as a deputy federal chairperson since 2023. Malatsi was the DA's national spokesperson between June 2018 and November 2020 and again from August 2022 until July 2024. He was also the Parliamentary Counsellor to the DA Parliamentary Leader and held posts in the DA's shadow cabinet.

Following the 2024 South African general election he now serves as the Minister of Communications and Digital Technologies.

== Early life and education ==
Malatsi was born in Ga-Dikgale in the former Transvaal Province. He matriculated from Phiri Kolobe High School and went on to obtain a Bachelor of Administration from the University of Limpopo. Malatsi also achieved an Honours Degree in political studies from the University of the Witwatersrand. Malatsi is a graduate of the DA's Young Leaders Programme.

== Political career ==
Malatsi became a parliamentary researcher for the DA in 2008. He then worked as a spokesperson for the Western Cape Provincial Minister of Transport and Public Works, Robin Carlisle, from 2009 to 2011. Between 2011 and 2014, he served as the spokesperson for Cape Town Mayor Patricia de Lille.

In May 2014, he became an MP for the DA and was appointed as Shadow Minister of Sport and Recreation. He was later appointed as Shadow Minister of Human Settlements.

In June 2018, Malatsi was appointed as national spokesperson for the DA, succeeding Phumzile van Damme. He was re-elected for a second term as an MP in May 2019. He then became the party's Shadow Minister in the Presidency in June. In October 2019, he was appointed parliamentary counsellor to the newly elected DA parliamentary leader, John Steenhuisen.

On 24 November 2020, Malatsi stepped down as the DA's national spokesperson. Malatsi was reappointed to the shadow cabinet as Shadow Minister in the Presidency in the following days.

In the 2020 Register of Members’ Interests, Malatsi revealed that he had received remuneration from the Foschini Group for a sports photo shoot.

On 18 August 2022, Malatsi was appointed as the DA's national spokesperson, succeeding Siviwe Gwarube, who became the new chief whip of the DA's parliamentary caucus.

Malatsi was elected as one of three deputy federal chairpersons of the DA at the party's Federal Congress in 2023. In April 2026, Malatsi stood for re-election as a federal chairperson. He supported Cape Town Mayor Geordin Hill-Lewis's campaign for DA leader. He was re-elected at the party's Federal Congress on 12 April 2026.

== National government ==
In July 2024, Malatsi was sworn in as the Minister of Communications and Digital Technologies.

In November 2024, Malatsi withdrew the South African Broadcasting Corporation SOC Ltd Bill (B32-2023), widely known as the SABC Bill, citing concerns that it does not address the public broadcaster's funding model and that it grants the Minister of Communications and Digital Technologies excessive influence over board appointments. The chairperson of the Portfolio Committee on Communications and Digital Technologies in the National Assembly, Khusela Diko, criticised Malatsi's decision, describing it as a potential "death knell" for the SABC.

In April 2026, Malatsi published the Draft South Africa National Artificial Intelligence (AI) Policy 2026 for public comment and subsequently withdrew the draft policy following a scandal involving the inclusion of fake, AI-hallucinated citations in its reference list. On 25 April 2026, Khusela Diko, the chairperson of the parliamentary Portfolio Committee on Communications and Digital Technologies publicly called for the Minister of to withdraw the policy on an X post, Two unnamed officials were suspended pending internal investigation into the inclusion of fictitious citations.
