= Karabo Khakhau =

South African politician

Karabo Khakhau MP

National Spokesperson of the Democratic Alliance
- Incumbent
- Assumed office 15 July 2024 Serving with Jan de Villiers
- Leader: John Steenhuisen
- Preceded by: Solly Malatsi; Werner Horn

Member of the National Assembly of South Africa
- Incumbent
- Assumed office 16 November 2022
- Preceded by: Patricia Kopane
- Constituency: National List

Member of the Free State Provincial Legislature
- In office 22 May 2019 – 15 November 2022

Personal details
- Born: Karabo Lerato Khakhau; 27 June 1997 (age 28) Welkom
- Party: Democratic Alliance
- Education: University of the Witwatersrand
- Profession: Politician

Karabo Lerato Khakhau (Democratic Alliance National Spokesperson) is a South African politician and a Member of the South African National Assembly for the Democratic Alliance since November 2022. Prior to this, she served as a DA Member of the Free State Provincial Legislature from May 2019 until November 2022. Aged 21 years at the time of her election to the Provincial Legislature, she became the youngest ever Member of Provincial Legislature in South Africa. Khakhau is a former President of the Student Representative Council (SRC) of the University of Cape Town (UCT) for the council term 2017/18. In this election she received the highest number of votes amongst all candidates in the institution.

== Early life and education ==
Khakhau hails from Welkom in the Free State. She holds a Graduate Certificate in Advanced Governance and Public Leadership from the University of the Witwatersrand's School of Governance. She matriculated from Welkom-Gimnasiumin 2015. She thereafter studied towards a Bachelor of Social Science Degree where she majored in Politics & Governance, Sociology, and Social Development at the University of Cape Town. She, in 2019, put her academic career on pause and dedicated her time towards public service in the Free State Legislature. She is currently pursuing a postgraduate qualification in Public Management at the Wits School of Governance.

== Political career ==
Khakhau joined the Democratic Alliance in 2016. As a student activist she served as the Democratic Alliance Students Organisation (DASO) Branch Chairperson of the University of Cape Town. She was also elected the DASO Western Cape Provincial Interim Chairperson. In October 2017, the DA's student organisation won a majority of nine out of the fifteen seats on the student representative council of the University of Cape Town. She received the highest students votes in this election and was elected president of the SRC not so long after.

After the provincial election that was held on 8 May 2019, Khakhau was nominated to the Free State Provincial Legislature as the party's support in the province grew. She was sworn in as a member of the legislature on 22 May 2019. Consequently, she became the youngest ever member, since she was only 21 when she assumed office.

On 15 November 2022, Khakhau resigned from the Free State Legislature to take up the former DA provincial leader in the Free State, Patricia Kopane's seat in the National Assembly. She was sworn in as a Member of Parliament on 16 November. The DA's caucus leader in the Dihlabeng Municipality, Jafta Mokoena, replaced Khaukau in the Provincial Legislature.

On 21 April 2023, Khakhau became the Shadow Deputy Minister of Higher Education, Science and Innovation.

Khakhau was elected to a full term in Parliament in the 2024 general election. On 15 July 2024, she was named a national spokesperson of the Democratic Alliance.
