= Bernice Swarts =

South African politician (b. 1972)

Bernice Swarts MP

Deputy Minister of Forestry, Fisheries and Environmental Affairs
- Incumbent
- Assumed office 7 March 2023
- Minister: Barbara Creecy→Dion George
- Preceded by: Noxolo Kiviet

Member of the National Assembly of South Africa
- Incumbent
- Assumed office 22 May 2019
- Constituency: Gauteng

Personal details
- Born: 19 February 1972 (age 54)
- Party: African National Congress
- Occupation: Member of Parliament

Bernice Swarts (born 19 February 1972) is a South African politician who is the current Deputy Minister of Forestry, Fisheries and Environmental Affairs and a Member of the National Assembly of South Africa for the African National Congress.

== Parliamentary career ==
In March 2019, the African National Congress (ANC) announced their candidate lists for the national and provincial elections on 8 May 2019. Swarts was placed 17th on the ANC's Gauteng regional to national list. At the election on May 8, the ANC won 53.2% of the vote on the national ballot in Gauteng, which resulted in them winning 26 out of the 47 regional Gauteng seats in the National Assembly. Swarts was elected to the National Assembly and sworn into office on 22 May during the first sitting of parliament following the election.

On 27 June 2019, Swarts was appointed to serve on the Portfolio Committee on International Relations and Cooperation and the Standing Committee on Public Accounts (SCOPA).

In November 2019, it was reported that Swarts was being probed for allegedly deceiving businessperson Tuwani Mulaudzi in 2013 of R500,000 under the pretext that the money was going to be donated to the ANC's 2014 election campaign. Mulaudzi attempted to get Swarts to repay the money after he learnt that Swarts had decided to keep the money for herself, but she refused to repay him. Only after it was announced that she was elected an MP, he decided to reclaim the money again and reported the matter to the National Assembly speaker, Thandi Modise, who referred it to the ANC chief in the National Assembly, Pemmy Majodina.

On 15 July 2020, Swarts left the Standing Committee on Public Accounts. She then only served on the Portfolio Committee on International Relations and Cooperation.

In March 2021 Swarts rejected opposition parties' claims that the government turns a blind eye to officials who have been found guilty of corruption in the public sector. She said that the government is taking the matter seriously.

== Career in government: 2023 ==
Swarts was promoted to Deputy Minister of Public Works and Infrastructure in March 2023.

In July 2023, Swarts unsuccessfully stood for the position of Deputy President of the African National Congress Women's League at the league's elective conference. She lost to Lungi Mnganga-Gcabashe.

Appointed deputy minister of department of Forestry, Fisheries and Environmental Affairs (DFFE) since July 2024

=== Alleged corrupt connections with Cat Matlala ===
In October 2026, Swarts' name appeared in a leaked draft affidavit of Vusimuzi Cat Matlala where he alleged that Swarts offered to help him secure a lease to operate a hospital on the South African Police Service’s (SAPS) campus in Tshwane and also obtain additional buildings. Matlala stated that it was Shadrack Sibiya who arranged a meeting with Swarts in 2023 and that she wanted R80 000 to buy alcohol for a traditional ceremony. A further R200 000 was requested from Matlala before the lease agreement was signed and handed over to him in mid-December 2023.
