= 1999 South African general election =

- 2 June 1999

All 400 seats in the National Assembly 201 seats needed for a majority
- Registered: 18,172,751
- Turnout: 89.30% (▲2.43pp)
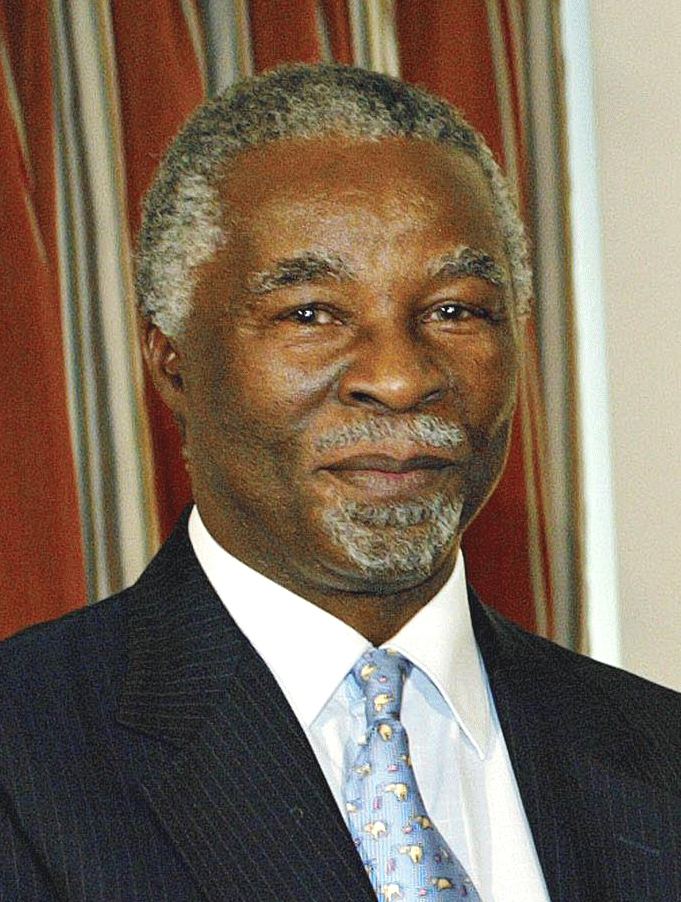

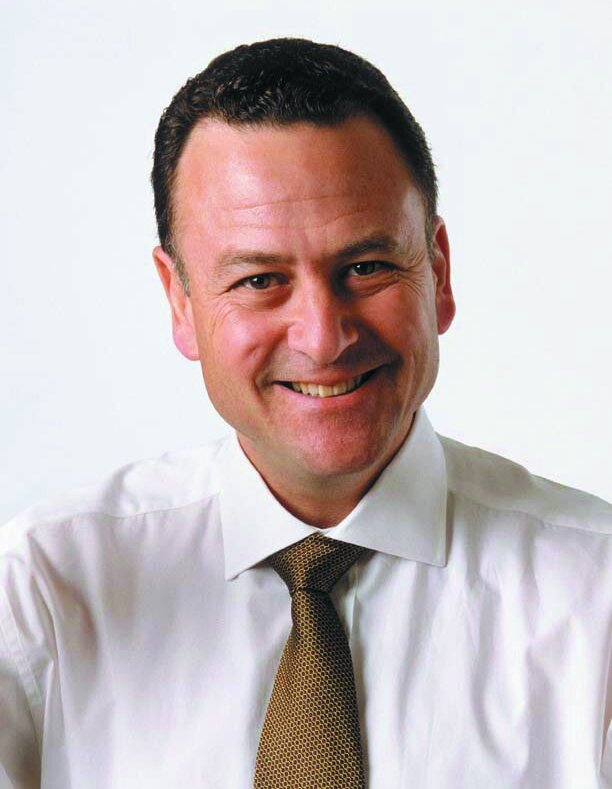

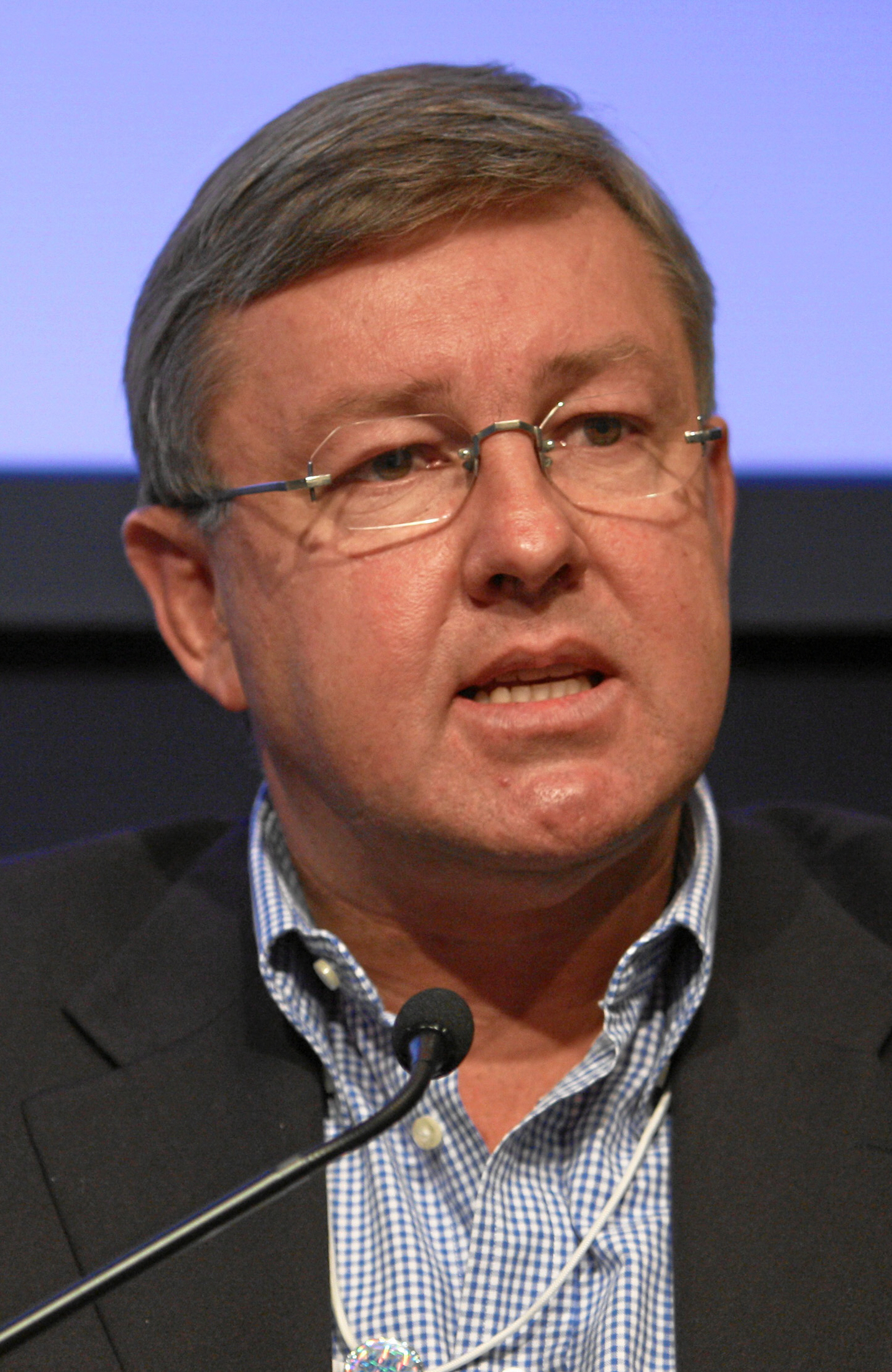

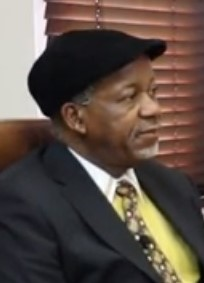
	First party	Second party	Third party
Leader	Thabo Mbeki	Tony Leon	Mangosuthu Buthelezi
Party	ANC	DP	IFP
Last election	62.65%, 252 seats	1.73%, 7 seats	10.54%, 43 seats
Seats won	266	38	34
Seat change	▲14	▲31	▼9
Popular vote	10,601,330	1,527,337	1,371,477
Percentage	66.35%	9.56%	8.58%
Swing	▲3.70pp	▲7.83pp	▼1.96pp
	Fourth party	Fifth party	Sixth party
Leader	Marthinus van Schalkwyk	Bantu Holomisa	Kenneth Meshoe
Party	NNP	UDM	ACDP
Last election	20.39%, 82 seats (Note: As National Party.)	Did not exist	0.45%, 2 seats
Seats won	28	14	6
Seat change	▼54	New party	▲4
Popular vote	1,098,215	546,790	228,975
Percentage	6.87%	3.42%	1.43%
Swing	▼13.52pp	New party	▲0.98pp
President before election
Nelson Mandela
ANC
Elected President
Thabo Mbeki
ANC

General elections were held in South Africa on 2 June 1999. The result was a landslide victory for the governing African National Congress (ANC), which gained fourteen seats. Incumbent president Nelson Mandela declined to seek re-election as president on grounds of his age. This election was notable for the sharp decline of the New National Party, previously the National Party (NP), which without former State President F. W. de Klerk lost more than half of their former support base. The liberal Democratic Party became the largest opposition party, after being the fifth largest party in the previous elections in 1994. The number of parties represented in the National Assembly increased to thirteen, with the United Democratic Movement, jointly headed by former National Party member Roelf Meyer, and former ANC member Bantu Holomisa, being the most successful of the newcomers with fourteen seats.

== National Assembly results ==
Party	Votes	%	Seats	+/–
African National Congress	10,601,330	66.35	266	+14
Democratic Party	1,527,337	9.56	38	+31
Inkatha Freedom Party	1,371,477	8.58	34	−9
New National Party	1,098,215	6.87	28	−54
United Democratic Movement	546,790	3.42	14	New
African Christian Democratic Party	228,975	1.43	6	+4
Freedom Front	127,217	0.80	3	−6
United Christian Democratic Party	125,280	0.78	3	New
Pan Africanist Congress	113,125	0.71	3	−2
Federal Alliance	86,704	0.54	2	New
Minority Front	48,277	0.30	1	+1
Afrikaner Eenheidsbeweging	46,292	0.29	1	New
Azanian People's Organisation	27,257	0.17	1	New
Abolition of Income Tax and Usury Party	10,611	0.07	0	New
Government by the People Green Party	9,193	0.06	0	New
Socialist Party of Azania	9,062	0.06	0	New
Total	15,977,142	100.00	400	0
Valid votes	15,977,142	98.45		
Invalid/blank votes	251,320	1.55		
Total votes	16,228,462	100.00		
Registered voters/turnout	18,172,751	89.30		
Source: Election Resources

== Provincial legislature results ==
Party	EC	FS	G	KZN	M	NW	NC	NP	WC
African National Congress	47	25	50	32	26	27	20	44	18
New National Party	2	2	3	3	1	1	8	1	17
Inkatha Freedom Party	0	0	3	34	0	0	0	0	0
Democratic Party	4	2	13	7	1	1	1	1	5
United Democratic Movement	9	0	1	1	1	0	0	1	1
Freedom Front	0	1	1	0	1	1	1	0	0
African Christian Democratic Party	0	0	1	1	0	0	0	1	1
United Christian Democratic Party	–	0	0	–	0	3	–	–	–
Minority Front	–	–	–	2	–	–	–	–	–
Pan Africanist Congress of Azania	1	0	0	0	0	0	0	1	0
Federal Alliance	0	0	1	0	0	0	0	0	0
Total	63	30	73	80	30	33	30	49	42

=== Eastern Cape ===
Party	Votes	%	Seats	+/–
African National Congress	1,606,856	73.80	47	−1
United Democratic Movement	296,015	13.60	9	New
Democratic Party	136,859	6.29	4	+3
New National Party	70,141	3.22	2	−4
Pan Africanist Congress	24,837	1.14	1	0
African Christian Democratic Party	20,857	0.96	0	0
Freedom Front	7,287	0.33	0	0
Inkatha Freedom Party	7,166	0.33	0	0
Afrikaner Eenheidsbeweging	3,673	0.17	0	New
Federal Alliance	3,575	0.16	0	New
Total	2,177,266	100.00	63	+7
Valid votes	2,177,266	98.62		
Invalid/blank votes	30,469	1.38		
Total votes	2,207,735	100.00		
Registered voters/turnout	2,454,543	89.94		
Source: Election Resources

=== Free State ===
Party	Votes	%	Seats	+/–
African National Congress	881,381	80.79	25	+1
Democratic Party	58,163	5.33	2	+2
New National Party	56,740	5.20	2	−2
Freedom Front	22,996	2.11	1	−1
United Democratic Movement	18,194	1.67	0	New
Pan Africanist Congress	12,548	1.15	0	0
African Christian Democratic Party	9,827	0.90	0	0
Federal Alliance	8,798	0.81	0	New
United Christian Democratic Party	8,543	0.78	0	New
Inkatha Freedom Party	5,119	0.47	0	0
Afrikaner Eenheidsbeweging	4,390	0.40	0	New
Unemployment Labour Alliance	2,974	0.27	0	New
Socialist Party of Azania	1,235	0.11	0	New
Total	1,090,908	100.00	30	0
Valid votes	1,090,908	98.47		
Invalid/blank votes	16,943	1.53		
Total votes	1,107,851	100.00		
Registered voters/turnout	1,225,730	90.38		
Source: Election Resources

=== Gauteng ===
Party	Votes	%	Seats	+/–
African National Congress	2,488,780	67.87	50	0
Democratic Party	658,236	17.95	13	+8
New National Party	142,579	3.89	3	−18
Inkatha Freedom Party	128,807	3.51	3	0
United Democratic Movement	71,630	1.95	1	New
Freedom Front	45,750	1.25	1	−4
African Christian Democratic Party	42,621	1.16	1	0
Federal Alliance	32,494	0.89	1	New
Pan Africanist Congress	26,781	0.73	0	−1
Afrikaner Eenheidsbeweging	11,450	0.31	0	New
United Christian Democratic Party	8,642	0.24	0	New
Azanian People's Organisation	5,896	0.16	0	New
Socialist Party of Azania	1,990	0.05	0	New
Labor Party	1,096	0.03	0	New
Total	3,666,752	100.00	73	–13
Valid votes	3,666,752	98.90		
Invalid/blank votes	40,843	1.10		
Total votes	3,707,595	100.00		
Registered voters/turnout	4,154,087	89.25		
Source: Election Resources

=== KwaZulu-Natal ===
Party	Votes	%	Seats	+/–
Inkatha Freedom Party	1,241,522	41.90	34	−7
African National Congress	1,167,094	39.38	32	+6
Democratic Party	241,779	8.16	7	+5
New National Party	97,077	3.28	3	−6
Minority Front	86,770	2.93	2	+1
African Christian Democratic Party	53,745	1.81	1	0
United Democratic Movement	34,586	1.17	1	New
Federal Alliance	9,762	0.33	0	New
Pan Africanist Congress	7,654	0.26	0	−1
Freedom Front	6,804	0.23	0	0
Afrikaner Eenheidsbeweging	5,801	0.20	0	New
Azanian People's Organisation	5,052	0.17	0	New
Socialist Party of Azania	3,451	0.12	0	New
Mass United Movement	2,261	0.08	0	New
Total	2,963,358	100.00	80	–1
Valid votes	2,963,358	98.47		
Invalid/blank votes	46,141	1.53		
Total votes	3,009,499	100.00		
Registered voters/turnout	3,443,978	87.38		
Source: Election Resources

=== Mpumalanga ===
Party	Votes	%	Seats	+/–
African National Congress	954,788	84.83	26	+1
Democratic Party	50,421	4.48	1	+1
New National Party	27,909	2.48	1	−2
Freedom Front	19,170	1.70	1	−1
United Democratic Movement	16,013	1.42	1	New
Inkatha Freedom Party	15,901	1.41	0	0
African Christian Democratic Party	12,586	1.12	0	0
Federal Alliance	9,019	0.80	0	New
Pan Africanist Congress	7,296	0.65	0	0
Afrikaner Eenheidsbeweging	4,520	0.40	0	New
Sindawonye Progressive Party	4,318	0.38	0	New
United Christian Democratic Party	2,553	0.23	0	New
Azanian People's Organisation	1,090	0.10	0	New
Total	1,125,584	100.00	30	0
Valid votes	1,125,584	98.13		
Invalid/blank votes	21,502	1.87		
Total votes	1,147,086	100.00		
Registered voters/turnout	1,277,783	89.77		
Source: Election Resources

=== North West ===
Party	Votes	%	Seats	+/–
African National Congress	1,030,901	78.97	27	+1
United Christian Democratic Party	124,874	9.57	3	New
Democratic Party	42,593	3.26	1	+1
New National Party	29,931	2.29	1	−2
Freedom Front	17,964	1.38	1	0
United Democratic Movement	16,785	1.29	0	New
African Christian Democratic Party	12,227	0.94	0	0
Pan Africanist Congress	9,613	0.74	0	0
Federal Alliance	7,157	0.55	0	New
Inkatha Freedom Party	6,759	0.52	0	0
Afrikaner Eenheidsbeweging	6,637	0.51	0	New
Total	1,305,441	100.00	33	+3
Valid votes	1,305,441	98.36		
Invalid/blank votes	21,722	1.64		
Total votes	1,327,163	100.00		
Registered voters/turnout	1,527,672	86.87		
Source: Election Resources

=== Northern Cape ===
Party	Votes	%	Seats	+/–
African National Congress	210,837	64.32	20	+5
New National Party	79,214	24.17	8	−4
Democratic Party	15,632	4.77	1	0
Freedom Front	5,446	1.66	1	−1
African Christian Democratic Party	5,004	1.53	0	0
United Democratic Movement	2,936	0.90	0	New
Pan Africanist Congress	2,158	0.66	0	0
Federal Alliance	1,735	0.53	0	New
Inkatha Freedom Party	1,728	0.53	0	0
Afrikaner Eenheidsbeweging	1,722	0.53	0	New
Azanian People's Organisation	1,360	0.41	0	New
Total	327,772	100.00	30	0
Valid votes	327,772	98.53		
Invalid/blank votes	4,897	1.47		
Total votes	332,669	100.00		
Registered voters/turnout	377,173	88.20		
Source: Election Resources

=== Northern Province ===
Party	Votes	%	Seats	+/–
African National Congress	1,464,432	88.29	44	+6
United Democratic Movement	41,700	2.51	1	New
New National Party	28,159	1.70	1	0
Democratic Party	23,486	1.42	1	+1
Pan Africanist Congress	23,325	1.41	1	+1
African Christian Democratic Party	18,281	1.10	1	+1
Ximoko Party	13,817	0.83	0	0
Freedom Front	10,727	0.65	0	−1
Azanian People's Organisation	8,931	0.54	0	New
Dabalorivhuwa Patriotic Front	8,229	0.50	0	New
Afrikaner Eenheidsbeweging	6,598	0.40	0	New
Inkatha Freedom Party	5,644	0.34	0	0
Federal Alliance	5,365	0.32	0	New
Total	1,658,694	100.00	49	+9
Valid votes	1,658,694	98.51		
Invalid/blank votes	25,137	1.49		
Total votes	1,683,831	100.00		
Registered voters/turnout	1,847,766	91.13		
Source: Election Resources

=== Western Cape ===
Party	Votes	%	Seats	+/–
African National Congress	668,106	42.07	18	+4
New National Party	609,612	38.39	17	−6
Democratic Party	189,183	11.91	5	+2
African Christian Democratic Party	44,323	2.79	1	0
United Democratic Movement	38,071	2.40	1	New
Africa Moral Party	9,513	0.60	0	0
Pan Africanist Congress	7,708	0.49	0	0
Freedom Front	6,394	0.40	0	−1
Federal Alliance	4,153	0.26	0	New
Inkatha Freedom Party	2,895	0.18	0	0
Afrikaner Eenheidsbeweging	2,854	0.18	0	New
Government by the People Green Party	2,453	0.15	0	0
National Coalition Party	1,126	0.07	0	New
People's Liberation Party	915	0.06	0	New
Workers International Vanguard League	672	0.04	0	0
Total	1,587,978	100.00	42	0
Valid votes	1,587,978	99.16		
Invalid/blank votes	13,499	0.84		
Total votes	1,601,477	100.00		
Registered voters/turnout	1,864,019	85.92		
Source: Election Resources

=== NCOP seats ===
The National Council of Provinces (NCOP) consists of 90 members, ten elected by each provincial legislature. The Members of NCOP have to be elected in proportion to the party membership of the provincial legislature.

Party	Delegate type	EC	FS	G	KZN	M	NW	NC	NP	WC	Total	
African National Congress	Permanent	4	4	4	2	5	4	4	5	2	34	63
African National Congress	Special	3	4	3	2	4	4	3	4	2	29	63
New National Party	Permanent		1	1	1			2		2	7	10
New National Party	Special							1		2	3	10
Democratic Party	Permanent	1	1	1	1	1	1			1	7	8
Democratic Party	Special			1							1	8
Inkatha Freedom Party	Permanent				2						2	4
Inkatha Freedom Party	Special				2						2	4
United Democratic Movement	Permanent	1							1		2	3
United Democratic Movement	Special	1									1	3
African Christian Democratic Party	Permanent									1	1	
United Christian Democratic Party	Permanent						1				1	
Total		10	10	10	10	10	10	10	10	10	90	
Source: South Africa Survey 2002/03

== Aftermath ==
Thabo Mbeki was elected president (unopposed) by the new Assembly on 14 June 1999 in 1999 South African presidential election, succeeding Nelson Mandela.
