= National Action (South Africa) =

Defunct political party in South Africa

National Action (more commonly known by its Afrikaans name, Nasionale Aksie) was a short-lived South African political party formed in December 2001 by the Afrikaner Eenheidsbeweging's (AEB) Cassie Aucamp and former National Party minister Danie Schutte. Aucump retained dual membership of the parties before leaving the Afrikaner Eenheidsbeweging (AEB) in the 2003 floor-crossing window. The AEB, along with other Afrikaner parties, was merging into the Freedom Front Plus to contest the 2004 elections but the National Action, claiming to support Afrikaner interests, remained separate, and competed in the 2004 elections. It won no seats in the National Assembly of South Africa or any of the provincial legislatures. It did not contest the 2009 elections.

== Election results ==
Election	Votes	%	Seats
2004	15,804	0.10	0
