= List of National Assembly members of the 23rd Parliament of South Africa =

2nd National Assembly
←	1st	3rd	→
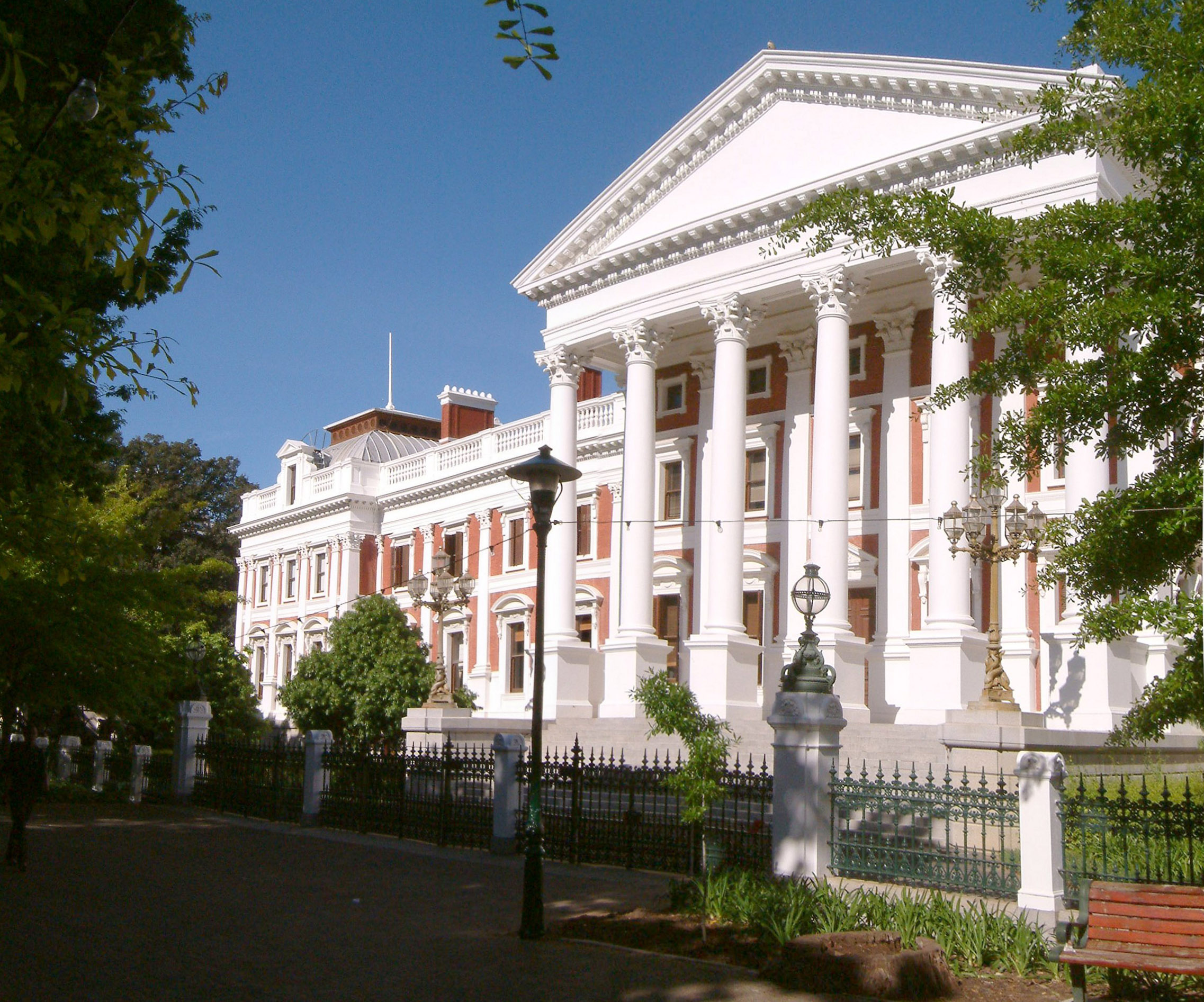
- Houses of Parliament, Cape Town

Overview
- Legislative body: National Assembly of South Africa
- Jurisdiction: South Africa
- Meeting place: Houses of Parliament
- Term: June 1999 – April 2004
- Election: 2 June 1999
- Members: 400
- Speaker: Frene Ginwala (ANC)
- Deputy Speaker: Baleka Mbete (ANC)
- President: Thabo Mbeki (ANC)
- Leader of the Opposition: Tony Leon (DP)
- Cabinet: Mbeki I
- Party control: African National Congress

This article lists the members of the National Assembly of South Africa during the 23rd South African Parliament, which sat between 1999 and 2004. Members were elected during the elections of 2 June 1999, South Africa's second under universal suffrage. The African National Congress (ANC) augmented its majority, winning a super-majority of 266 seats in the 400-seat legislature, and the Democratic Party (DP) superseded the defunct National Party as the official opposition. The ANC's Thabo Mbeki was elected to his first term as President of South Africa.

On 14 June 1999, the Assembly re-elected Frene Ginwala as Speaker of the National Assembly and re-elected Baleka Mbete as Ginwala's deputy. Though Ginwala was elected unopposed, Mbete beat a challenge from Dene Smuts of the DP, who received 47 votes against Mbete's 326.

== Composition ==
The table below shows the number of seats held by each party in the assembly. While the first column provides the number of seats won in the 2 June 1999 election, the second column reflects the state of parties as of 5 April 2003 at the conclusion of the 2003 floor-crossing window.

Party	1999	2003
African National Congress	266	275
Democratic Party	38	—
Inkatha Freedom Party	34	31
New National Party	28	20
United Democratic Movement	14	4
African Christian Democratic Party	6	7
Freedom Front	3	3
United Christian Democratic Party	3	3
Pan Africanist Congress	3	2
Federal Alliance	2	2
Minority Front	1	1
Afrikaner Eenheidsbeweging	1	0
Azanian People's Organisation	1	1
Democratic Alliance	—	46
Alliance for Democracy and Prosperity	—	1
Independent African Movement	—	1
Independent Democrats	—	1
National Action	—	1
Peace and Justice Congress	—	1
Total	400	400

During the floor-crossing window, the official opposition, the DP, formally relaunched as the Democratic Alliance; its members and their seats were therefore transferred. The window also saw the creation of five new political parties with one representative apiece in the National Assembly: the Alliance for Democracy and Prosperity (represented by Nelson Ramodike, formerly of the United Democratic Movement), the Independent African Movement (represented by the Inkatha Freedom Party's Teresa Millin), the Independent Democrats (represented by the Pan Africanist Congress's Patricia de Lille), National Action (represented by the Afrikaner Eenheidsbeweging's Cassie Aucamp), and the Peace and Justice Congress (represented by the Inkatha Freedom Party's Farouk Cassim).

== Graphical representation ==
This is a graphical comparison of party strengths as they were in the National Assembly at the outset of the 23rd Parliament:

== Members ==
The following lists the Members of the National Assembly as elected on 2 June 1999, accounting for members who withdrew from the list in the immediate aftermath of the election and taking into account changes in membership until November 2001.

Member	Party	List
Thomas Abrahams	UDM	National
Salam Abram	UDM	Gauteng
Roy Ainslie	ANC	KwaZulu-Natal
Ken Andrew	DP	Western Cape
Jonathan Arendse	ANC	Western Cape
Kader Asmal	ANC	National
Cassie Aucamp	AEB	National
Dirk Bakker	NNP	Gauteng
Ngconde Balfour	ANC	National
Gaoretelelwe Baloi	UCDP	North West
Olaf Baloyi	IFP	KwaZulu-Natal
Richard Baloyi	ANC	Limpopo
Sponono Baloyi	ANC	National
Hennie Bekker	IFP	National
Brian Bell	DP	Mpumalanga
Jean Benjamin	ANC	National
Francois Beukman	NNP	Western Cape
Fezile Bhengu	ANC	National
Geoffrey Bhengu	IFP	KwaZulu-Natal
Ruth Bhengu	ANC	National
Bhekizwe Biyela	IFP	KwaZulu-Natal
Adriaan Blaas	NNP	KwaZulu-Natal
Sakkie Blanché	FA	National
Dennis Bloem	ANC	National
Hendrietta Bogopane	ANC	National
Mnyamezeli Booi	ANC	Western Cape
Gloria Borman	DP	KwaZulu-Natal
Andries Botha	DP	Free State
Ntombazana Botha	ANC	Eastern Cape
Nigel Bruce	DP	Gauteng
Mangosuthu Buthelezi	IFP	National
Mildred Buthelezi	ANC	KwaZulu-Natal
Ismail Cachalia	ANC	National
Sheila Camerer	NNP	Gauteng
Yunus Carrim	ANC	National
Farouk Cassim	IFP	National
Judy Chalmers	ANC	Eastern Cape
Patrick Chauke	ANC	National
Laloo Chiba	ANC	National
Lassy Chiwayo	ANC	Mpumalanga
Moss Chikane	ANC	Gauteng
Fatima Chohan	ANC	National
Nonceba Cindi	ANC	North West
Nic Clelland	DP	KwaZulu-Natal
Mietha Coetzee-Kasper	ANC	Free State
Jeremy Cronin	ANC	National
Pauline Cupido	DP	Western Cape
Siyabonga Cwele	ANC	KwaZulu-Natal
Manny da Camara	DP	Mpumalanga
Ian Davidson	DP	Gauteng
Rob Davies	ANC	National
Johnny de Lange	ANC	National
Patricia de Lille	PAC	National
Tertius Delport	DP	Eastern Cape
Bonginkosi Dhlamini	IFP	Gauteng
Nelson Diale	ANC	Limpopo
Thoko Didiza	ANC	National
Sello Dithebe	ANC	National
Paul Ditshetelo	UCDP	National
David Dlali	ANC	National
Bathabile Dlamini	ANC	KwaZulu-Natal
Nkosazana Dlamini-Zuma	ANC	National
Geoff Doidge	ANC	Eastern Cape
Basil Douglas	IFP	Gauteng
Cobus Dowry	NNP	Western Cape
Cheryllyn Dudley	ACDP	KwaZulu-Natal
Ndleleni Duma	ANC	North West
Johann Durand	NNP	Gauteng
Dirk du Toit	ANC	Free State
Malcolm Dyani	ANC	National
Ebrahim Ebrahim	ANC	KwaZulu-Natal
Colin Eglin	DP	Western Cape
Mike Ellis	DP	KwaZulu-Natal
Alec Erwin	ANC	National
Felix Fankomo	ANC	Limpopo
Stuart Farrow	DP	Eastern Cape
Henry Fazzie	ANC	National
Elred Ferreira	IFP	National
Ben Fihla	ANC	Eastern Cape
Geraldine Fraser-Moleketi	ANC	National
Cedric Frolick	UDM	Eastern Cape
Ela Gandhi	ANC	KwaZulu-Natal
André Gaum	NNP	Western Cape
Ivy Gcina	ANC	Eastern Cape
Boy Geldenhuys	NNP	Gauteng
Mluleki George	ANC	Eastern Cape
Pierre-Jeanne Gerber	ANC	National
Douglas Gibson	DP	Gauteng
Cheryl Gillwald	ANC	Free State
Frene Ginwala	ANC	National
John Gogotya	ANC	National
John Gomomo	ANC	National
Mbulelo Goniwe	ANC	Eastern Cape
Alwyn Goosen	ANC	Eastern Cape
Vincent Gore	DP	Gauteng
Kobus Gous	NNP	Gauteng
Pregs Govender	ANC	National
Louis Green	ACDP	National
Carl Greyling	NNP	Western Cape
Mannetjies Grobler	DP	Gauteng
Pieter Groenewald	FF	National
Stefan Grové	ANC	Mpumalanga
Donald Gumede	ANC	National
Bertha Gxowa	ANC	Gauteng
Fatima Hajaig	ANC	Gauteng
Derek Hanekom	ANC	National
Nomatyala Hangana	ANC	National
Rudi Heine	DP	KwaZulu-Natal
Peter Hendrickse	ANC	Eastern Cape
Jackson Hlaneki	ANC	Limpopo
Nomvula Hlangwana	ANC	National
Mhlabunzima Hlengwa	IFP	KwaZulu-Natal
Barbara Hogan	ANC	Gauteng
Bantu Holomisa	UDM	National
Patekile Holomisa	ANC	Eastern Cape
Roy Jankielsohn	DP	Free State
Essop Jassat	ANC	National
John Jeffery	ANC	KwaZulu-Natal
Rhoda Joemat	ANC	Western Cape
Pallo Jordan	ANC	National
Mziwamadoda Kalako	ANC	National
Sandy Kalyan	DP	KwaZulu-Natal
Bruce Kannemeyer	ANC	Western Cape
Rebecca Kasienyane	ANC	North West
Ronnie Kasrils	ANC	National
James Kati	ANC	National
Nkenke Kekana	ANC	Gauteng
Jakob Kgarimetsa	ANC	North West
Qalas Kgauwe	ANC	North West
Lesiba Kgwele	ANC	North West
Butana Komphela	ANC	Free State
Gerhard Koornhof	UDM	National
Zoliswa Kota	ANC	National
Zunaid Kotwal	ANC	Mpumalanga
Nocwaka Lamani	ANC	National
Luwellyn Landers	ANC	National
Donald Lee	DP	Eastern Cape
Kgaogelo Lekgoro	ANC	Gauteng
Mpho Lekgoro	ANC	National
Mosiuoa Lekota	ANC	National
Tony Leon	DP	Gauteng
Elda Leshika	ANC	Limpopo
Charlotte Lobe	ANC	National
Desmond Lockey	ANC	North West
Tsietsi Louw	ANC	National
Sam Louw	ANC	North West
Mark Lowe	DP	KwaZulu-Natal
Eric Lucas	IFP	KwaZulu-Natal
Albertina Luthuli	ANC	KwaZulu-Natal
Arthur Lyle	ANC	Limpopo
Brigitte Mabandla	ANC	National
Louisa Mabe	ANC	National
Curtis Mabena	ANC	Gauteng
Masilo Mabeta	UDM	National
Rejoice Mabudafhasi	ANC	Limpopo
David Mabuza	ANC	Mpumalanga
Mighty Madasa	ACDP	Gauteng
Penuell Maduna	ANC	National
Ace Magashule	ANC	Free State
Mavis Magazi	ANC	Gauteng
Emmanuel Magubane	ANC	KwaZulu-Natal
Gratitude Magwanishe	ANC	Gauteng
Gwen Mahlangu	ANC	National
Mninwa Mahlangu	ANC	National
Nomhle Mahlawe	ANC	Eastern Cape
Farida Mahomed	ANC	National
Douglas Maimane	ANC	North West
Sophie Maine	ANC	North West
Welsh Makanda	UDM	National
Caroline Makasi	ANC	Western Cape
Helen Malebana	ANC	Limpopo
Lorna Maloney	ANC	National
Dan Maluleke	DP	Gauteng
Maureen Malumise	ANC	Free State
Winnie Mandela	ANC	National
Mosibudi Mangena	AZAPO	National
Salie Manie	ANC	National
Trevor Manuel	ANC	National
Magwaza Maphalala	ANC	KwaZulu-Natal
Ike Maphotho	ANC	Limpopo
Inka Mars	IFP	KwaZulu-Natal
Ben Martins	ANC	KwaZulu-Natal
Mzwandile Masala	ANC	Eastern Cape
Jakes Maseka	UDM	National
Tlokwe Maserumule	ANC	Limpopo
Ntsiki Mashimbye	ANC	National
Neo Masithela	ANC	National
Michael Masutha	ANC	National
Piet Mathebe	ANC	Mpumalanga
Ivy Matsepe-Casaburri	ANC	National
Joe Matthews	IFP	National
Maggie Maunye	ANC	Gauteng
Shepherd Mayatula	ANC	Eastern Cape
Ali Maziya	ANC	Gauteng
Lucas Mbadi	UDM	Eastern Cape
Baleka Mbete	ANC	National
Nozizwe Mbombo	ANC	Gauteng
Bukelwa Mbulawa	ANC	National
Lindiwe Mbuyazi	IFP	KwaZulu-Natal
Graham McIntosh	DP	KwaZulu-Natal
Membathisi Mdladlana	ANC	National
Kenneth Meshoe	ACDP	National
Isaac Mfundisi	UCDP	National
Norman Middleton	IFP	National
Dickson Mkono	UDM	Eastern Cape
Phumzile Mlambo-Ngcuka	ANC	National
Andrew Mlangeni	ANC	National
Pamela Mnandi	ANC	National
Albert Mncwango	IFP	KwaZulu-Natal
Nokuzola Mndende	UDM	National
Garth Piet Mngomezulu	ANC	Mpumalanga
Bafunani Mnguni	ANC	National
Susan Mnumzana	ANC	Free State
Thandi Modise	ANC	National
Lewele Modisenyane	ANC	Free State
Khatliso Moeketse	ANC	Free State
Ron Mofokeng	ANC	Gauteng
Stanley Mogoba	PAC	National
Ismail Mohamed	ANC	National
Johnny Mohlala	ANC	National
Peter Mokaba	ANC	National
Aubrey Mokoena	ANC	Gauteng
Angie Molebatsi	ANC	North West
Bernard Molewa	ANC	North West
Joyce Moloi	ANC	National
Arthur Moloto	ANC	Limpopo
Julius Mongwaketse	ANC	National
Dan Montsitsi	ANC	National
Kay Moonsamy	ANC	National
Errol Moorcroft	DP	Eastern Cape
Valli Moosa	ANC	National
Craig Morkel	NNP	Western Cape
Dimakatso Morobi	ANC	Gauteng
Rolson Moropa	ANC	Mpumalanga
Storey Morutoa	ANC	Gauteng
Kgoloko Morwamoche	ANC	Limpopo
Maxwell Moss	ANC	Western Cape
Lesiba Mothiba	UDM	National
Percylia Mothoagae	ANC	North West
Dorothy Motubatse	ANC	National
Mandisi Mpahlwa	ANC	Eastern Cape
Hlonitshwa Mpaka	ANC	Gauteng
Alfred Mpontshane	IFP	KwaZulu-Natal
Sithole Mshudulu	ANC	Gauteng
Mandla Msomi	IFP	KwaZulu-Natal
Sankie Mthembi-Mahanyele	ANC	National
Ben Mthembu	ANC	Mpumalanga
Nomsa Mtsweni	ANC	Mpumalanga
Wilson Mudau	ANC	Mpumalanga
Sydney Mufamadi	ANC	National
Corné Mulder	FF	National
Pieter Mulder	FF	National
Irene Mutsila	ANC	Limpopo
Abraham Mzizi	IFP	National
Monontsi Mzondeki	ANC	National
Billy Nair	ANC	National
John Henry Nash	ANC	Eastern Cape
John Ncinane	ANC	Eastern Cape
Bernard Ncube	ANC	National
Velaphi Ndlovu	IFP	KwaZulu-Natal
Samson Ndou	ANC	National
Rita Ndzanga	ANC	Gauteng
Andries Nel	ANC	National
Maans Nel	NNP	Northern Cape
Nhlanhla Nene	ANC	KwaZulu-Natal
Wilma Newhoudt-Druchen	ANC	National
Doris Ngcengwane	ANC	Gauteng
James Ngculu	ANC	National
Ben Ngubane	IFP	KwaZulu-Natal
Harriet Ngubane	IFP	National
Mbongeni Ngubeni	ANC	National
Lindiwe Ngwane	ANC	National
Lydia Ngwenya	ANC	Limpopo
Joe Nhlanhla	ANC	National
Nkosinathi Nhleko	ANC	National
Dumisile Nhlengethwa	ANC	Mpumalanga
Keppies Niemann	NNP	Northern Cape
Makho Njobe	ANC	National
Abe Nkomo	ANC	Gauteng
Boy Nobunga	ANC	National
Mwelo Nonkonyana	ANC	Eastern Cape
Charles Nqakula	ANC	National
Nosiviwe Nqakula	ANC	National
Sally Nqodi	ANC	Eastern Cape
Sisi Ntombela	ANC	National
Bongi Ntuli	ANC	Mpumalanga
Bheki Ntuli	ANC	KwaZulu-Natal
Richard Ntuli	DP	Gauteng
Benjamin Ntuli	ANC	Gauteng
Lewis Nzimande	ANC	National
Willem Odendaal	NNP	Free State
Martha Olckers	NNP	Western Cape
Dan Olifant	ANC	Western Cape
Godfrey Oliphant	ANC	National
Dullah Omar	ANC	National
Gert Oosthuizen	ANC	Gauteng
Sydney Opperman	DP	Western Cape
Aziz Pahad	ANC	National
Essop Pahad	ANC	National
John Phala	ANC	Limpopo
Elizabeth Phantsi	ANC	Northern Cape
Motsoko Pheko	PAC	National
Stephen Phohlela	ANC	Free State
Randy Pieterse	ANC	Western Cape
Richard Pillay	DP	Gauteng
Sakkie Pretorius	NNP	Western Cape
Pierre Rabie	NNP	Western Cape
Ruth Rabinowitz	IFP	National
Bheki Radebe	ANC	Free State
Jeff Radebe	ANC	National
Margaret Rajbally	MF	KwaZulu-Natal
Mandu Ramakaba-Lesiea	ANC	National
Mewa Ramgobin	ANC	National
Nelson Ramodike	UDM	Limpopo
Mampi Ramotsamai	ANC	National
Solomon Rasmeni	ANC	North West
Lanval Reid	ANC	National
Rodney Rhoda	NNP	Western Cape
Selby Ripinga	ANC	National
Usha Roopnarain	IFP	KwaZulu-Natal
Nozizwe Routledge	ANC	National
Cas Saloojee	ANC	Gauteng
Philip Schalkwyk	DP	Gauteng
Johnny Schippers	NNP	Western Cape
Hendrik Schmidt	DP	Gauteng
Greg Schneemann	ANC	Gauteng
Manie Schoeman	ANC	Eastern Cape
Renier Schoeman	NNP	KwaZulu-Natal
Mpho Scott	ANC	KwaZulu-Natal
Sybil Seaton	IFP	KwaZulu-Natal
Priscilla Sekgobela	ANC	Mpumalanga
James Selfe	DP	Western Cape
Janet Semple	DP	Gauteng
Connie September	ANC	National
Reggie September	ANC	National
Joe Seremane	DP	North West
Wally Serote	ANC	National
Susan Shabangu	ANC	National
Tinyiko Shilubana	ANC	National
Ntombi Shope	ANC	National
Maxwell Sibiya	IFP	National
Bernice Sigabi	DP	Gauteng
Stella Sigcau	ANC	National
Alice Sigcawu	ANC	National
Ezra Sigwela	ANC	Eastern Cape
Richard Sikakane	ANC	KwaZulu-Natal
Stan Simmons	NNP	Western Cape
Lindiwe Sisulu	ANC	National
Dumisani Sithole	ANC	Gauteng
Windvoel Skhosana	ANC	North West
Ben Skosana	IFP	National
Zola Skweyiya	ANC	National
Jan Slabbert	IFP	National
Hennie Smit	NNP	Western Cape
Peter Smith	IFP	National
Vincent Smith	ANC	Gauteng
Dene Smuts	DP	Western Cape
Bangilizwe Solo	ANC	Gauteng
Gassan Solomon	ANC	National
Buyelwa Sonjica	ANC	Eastern Cape
Jabu Sosibo	ANC	National
Maggie Sotyu	ANC	Free State
Rhoda Southgate	ACDP	Western Cape
Paul Swart	DP	North West
Steven Swart	ACDP	National
Raenette Taljaard	DP	Gauteng
Elizabeth Thabethe	ANC	National
Bulelwa Tinto	ANC	Western Cape
Jack Tolo	ANC	Limpopo
Manto Tshabalala-Msimang	ANC	National
Ntshadi Tsheole	ANC	Limpopo
Josephine Tshivhase	ANC	Limpopo
Steve Tshwete	ANC	National
Ben Turok	ANC	National
Ntombikayise Twala	ANC	National
Ismail Vadi	ANC	National
Randall van den Heever	ANC	National
Albertus van der Merwe	NNP	Free State
Koos van der Merwe	IFP	National
Susan van der Merwe	ANC	National
Frik van Deventer	NNP	Western Cape
Alie van Jaarsveld	NNP	Eastern Cape
Kraai van Niekerk	FA	National
Marthinus van Schalkwyk	NNP	Western Cape
Anna van Wyk	NNP	Western Cape
Annelizé van Wyk	UDM	National
Boeboe van Wyk	ANC	Northern Cape
Nelville van Wyk	ANC	Northern Cape
Suzanne Vos	IFP	National
Michael Waters	DP	Gauteng
Gavin Woods	IFP	National
Lulama Xingwana	ANC	Gauteng
Tony Yengeni	ANC	National
Langa Zita	ANC	Gauteng
Musa Zondi	IFP	KwaZulu-Natal
Paul Zondo	ANC	Gauteng
Nhlanhla Zulu	IFP	KwaZulu-Natal
Jacob Zuma	ANC	National

== Vacancies and replacements ==
The table below records mid-term departures from the legislature from the time of the election until November 2001.

Member	Party	Term End	Replacement
Lizzie Abrahams	ANC	1 May 2000	Replaced by Sello Dithebe on 1 May 2000.
Sakhiwo Belot	ANC	28 June 2001	Replaced by Sisi Ntombela on 3 July 2001.
Rosemary Capa	ANC	December 2000	Replaced by Nomhle Mahlawe on 16 February 2001.
Sam de Beer	UDM	15 February 2001	Replaced by Jakes Maseka on 20 February 2001.
Pierre de Vos	DP	12 June 2000	Replaced by Roy Jankielsohn on 13 June 2000.
Andrew Feinstein	ANC	31 August 2001	Replaced by David Dlali on 4 September 2001.
Malusi Gigaba	ANC	19 November 2001	Replaced by Lanval Reid on 20 November 2001.
Mabhuza Gininda	ANC	2 July 2001	Replaced by Wilson Mudau on 3 July 2001.
Limpho Hani	ANC	17 August 1999	Replaced by Kay Moonsamy on 27 September 1999.
Mlungisi Hlongwane	ANC	1 July 1999	Replaced by Ismail Mohamed on 26 July 1999.
Priscilla Jana	ANC	22 March 2001	Replaced by Boy Nobunga on 3 July 2001.
Themba Khoza	IFP	28 May 2000	Replaced by Bonginkosi Dhlamini on 21 June 2000.
Serake Leeuw	ANC	6 December 2000	Replaced by Nocwaka Lamani on 3 July 2001.
Louis Luyt	FA	1 February 2001	Replaced by Sakkie Blanché on 1 February 2001.
Janet Love	ANC	1 August 1999	Replaced by Hlonitshwa Mpaka on 10 August 1999.
Cengi Mahlalela	ANC	6 December 2000	Replaced by Lassy Chiwayo on 3 July 2001.
Thabo Makunyane	ANC	5 December 2000	Vacant as of November 2001.
Thabang Makwetla	ANC	2 July 2001	Replaced by Curtis Mabena on 3 July 2001.
Beatrice Marshoff	ANC	28 June 2001	Replaced by Bafunani Mnguni on 3 July 2001.
Thabo Mbeki	ANC	14 June 1999	Replaced by Ephraim Mogale on 14 June 1999.
Fihli Mbongo	ANC	29 December 2000	Replaced by Gert Oosthuizen on 16 February 2001.
Roelf Meyer	UDM	31 January 2000	Replaced by Sagadava Naidoo on 1 February 2000.
Mighty Mgidi	ANC	2 July 2001	Replaced by David Mabuza on 3 July 2001.
Smangaliso Mkhatshwa	ANC	6 December 2000	Replaced by James Kati on 3 July 2001.
Bheki Mkhize	ANC	30 July 2000	Replaced by Johnny Mohlala on 1 September 2000.
Ephraim Mogale	ANC	2 July 2001	Replaced by Louisa Mabe on 3 July 2001.
Seiso Mohai	ANC	28 June 2001	Replaced by Butana Komphela on 3 July 2001.
Koko Mokgalong	ANC	1 July 1999	Replaced by Helen Malebana on 20 September 1999.
Jannie Momberg	ANC	26 June 2001	Replaced by Joyce Moloi on 1 August 2001.
Mtutuzeli Mpehle	ANC	1 April 2001	Replaced by Manie Schoeman on 1 April 2001.
Ndaba Mtirara	UDM	12 March 2001	Replaced by Dickson Mkono on 26 March 2001.
Lawrence Mushwana	ANC	21 June 1999	Replaced by Ntshadi Tsheole on 24 June 1999.
Sipo Mzimela	UDM	2001	Replaced by Welsh Makanda on 2 August 2001.
Sagadava Naidoo	UDM	2 November 2000	Replaced by Lesiba Mothiba on 20 February 2001.
Gabriel Ndabandaba	IFP	27 June 2001	Replaced by Usha Roopnarain on 27 June 2001.
Duma Nkosi	ANC	1 November 2001	Replaced by Storey Morutoa on 1 November 2001.
Isaiah Ntshangase	ANC	February 2001	Replaced by Albertina Luthuli on 2 April 2001.
Buyisiwe Nzimande	IFP	31 March 2001	Replaced by Olaf Baloyi on 1 April 2001.
Naledi Pandor	ANC	21 June 1999	Replaced by Mandu Ramakaba-Lesiea on 24 June 1999.
Mathews Phosa	ANC	11 August 1999	Replaced by Stefan Grové on 27 September 1999.
Kisten Rajoo	IFP	1 August 2000	Replaced by Maxwell Sibiya on 1 August 2000.
Gregory Rockman	ANC	1 May 2000	Replaced by Henry Fazzie on 3 May 2000.
Danie Schutte	NNP	31 January 2000	Replaced by Adriaan Blaas on 1 February 2000.
Omie Singh	DP	1 October 2001	Replaced by Mark Lowe on 1 October 2001.
Enver Surty	ANC	23 June 1999	Replaced by Percylia Mothoagae on 24 June 1999.
Melanie Verwoerd	ANC	1 March 2001	Replaced by Ismail Cachalia on 3 July 2001.
Bavumile Vilakazi	ANC	6 December 2000	Replaced by Rita Ndzanga on 28 February 2001.
Mthunzi Vilakazi	ANC	16 February 2000	Replaced by Rolson Moropa on 1 May 2000.
Constand Viljoen	FF	1 May 2001	Replaced by Pieter Groenewald on 1 May 2001.
Abe Williams	NNP	14 August 2000	Replaced by Johnny Schippers on 14 August 2000.
