= Nzimande =

Nzimande is a South African surname. Notable people with the surname include:

- Abel Nzimande (born 1961), South African sprinter
- Blade Nzimande (born 1958), South African politician
- Buyisiwe Nzimande (born 1952), South African politician and diplomat
- Lewis Nzimande, South African politician
