= Nonceba =

Nonceba is a feminine given name. Notable people with the name include:

- Nonceba Cindi (born 1951), South African politician
- Nonceba Kontsiwe (born 1959), South African politician
- Nonceba Mhlauli (born 1990), South African politician
- Nonceba Molwele (fl. from 2024), South African politician
- Lindiwe Nonceba Sisulu (born 1954), South African politician

== See also ==
- Nonribosomal peptide
