= Alie van Jaarsveld =

South African politician

Member of the National Assembly
- In office June 1999 – April 2004
- Constituency: Eastern Cape

Personal details
- Born: 28 January 1954 (age 72)
- Citizenship: South Africa
- Party: New National Party
- Spouse: Anne-Marie van Jaarsveld (divorced)

Adriaan Zacharias Albertus "Alie" van Jaarsveld (born 28 January 1954) is a South African politician and communications strategist. He represented the New National Party (NNP) in the National Assembly from 1999 to 2004, serving the Eastern Cape constituency. He later served as a spokesman in the Western Cape Provincial Government.

== Early life ==
Van Jaarsveld was born on 28 January 1954. His father, Ben van Jaarsveld, was a longtime employee of the National Party, the NNP's predecessor, and a self-described "apostle for the previous [apartheid] government".

== Political career ==
In the 1999 general election, van Jaarsveld was elected to represent the NNP in the National Assembly. With Manie Schoeman, he was one of the party's two representatives in the Eastern Cape constituency. During the parliamentary term that followed, he was also the NNP's media director.

Van Jaarsveld left Parliament after the 2004 general election. Shortly after the election, he was appointed as spokesman to his NNP colleague, Cobus Dowry, who was newly appointed as the Western Cape's Provincial Minister for Agriculture. The Democratic Alliance said that van Jaarsveld's appointment to this government office was an example of nepotism by the NNP.

== Personal life ==
Van Jaarsveld was married for three decades to Anne-Marie van Jaarsveld, who represented the NNP as a local councillor. They were separated by 2003 and van Jaarsveld began a relationship with an NNP parliamentary researcher. The Van Jaarsvelds' divorce proceedings in that year received extensive media attention after Anne-Marie told the press about her husband's new relationship.
