= Benjamin Ntuli =

South African politician

Member of the National Assembly
- In office June 1999 – May 2009

Personal details
- Born: Somangamane Benjamin Ntuli; 28 July 1962 (age 63)
- Citizenship: South Africa
- Party: African National Congress

Somangamane Benjamin Ntuli (born 28 July 1962) is a South African politician who represented the African National Congress (ANC) in the National Assembly from 1999 to 2009. He chaired the Portfolio Committee on Defence from 2008 to 2009.

== Early life and career ==
Ntuli was born on 28 July 1962 and matriculated at Hlangani Secondary School in Soshanguve, Transvaal in 1983. He joined the Azanian Students' Organisation in 1984 while studying toward a teaching diploma, which he completed in 1986. He studied at Vista University in Mamelodi from 1987 to 1989 but did not complete his degree. In the early 1990s, he worked full-time in community organising, and in December 1993 he left the country to receive military training at the Zimbabwe Military Academy in Harare, Zimbabwe.

Upon his return to South Africa, he was appointed as a national organiser for the South African Democratic Teachers' Union. In 1996, he joined the Khululekani Institute for Democracy as a researcher, and from 1997 to 1999 he worked as a labour relations officer at the Gauteng Department of Education.

== Legislative career: 1999–2009 ==
In the 1999 general election, Ntuli was elected to an ANC seat in the National Assembly. He was elected to a second term in the 2004 general election, and in November 2008 he was unanimously elected to chair the Portfolio Committee on Defence; he succeeded Fezile Bhengu, who had been appointed as Deputy Minister of Defence.
