= Johnny Mohlala =

South African politician

Member of the National Assembly
- In office 1 September 2000 – April 2004

Personal details
- Born: 18 July 1960 (age 65)
- Citizenship: South Africa
- Party: African National Congress
- Relations: Mampuru II (great-grandfather)

Ramphelane Johnny Bophelo Mohlala (born 18 July 1960) is a South African politician. He represented the African National Congress (ANC) in the National Assembly from 2000 to 2004.

== Early life ==
Mohlala was born on 18 July 1960. He is the great-grandson of Kgoši Mampuru II.

== Legislative career ==
Mohlala was not initially elected to the National Assembly in the 1999 general election, but he joined during the legislative term: he was sworn in on 1 September 2000 to fill the casual vacancy arising from Bheki Mkhize's death. He was not re-elected to the seat in the 2004 general election, although he remained listed on the ANC's party list in case of further casual vacancies.

In the 2019 general election, he stood unsuccessfully for election to the National Assembly, again on the ANC's list.
