= Gaoretelelwe Baloi =

South African politician (born 1946)

Personal details
- Born: Gaoretelelwe Elias Baloi; 4 January 1946 (age 79)
- Citizenship: South Africa
- Political party: United Christian Democratic Party

Gaoretelelwe Elias Baloi (born 4 January 1946) is a retired South African politician who served in the National Assembly during the second democratic Parliament. He was a member of the United Christian Democratic Party (UCDP) and also chaired a regional branch of the party.

Baloi was elected to the assembly in the 1999 general election as the UCDP's sole representative in the North West caucus. He vacated his seat before the end of the legislative term and was replaced by Mpai Agnes Seeco.
