= Nocwaka Lamani =

South African politician and activist (1931–2021)

Member of the National Assembly
- In office 3 July 2001 – April 2004

Member of the National Council of Provinces

Assembly Member for Eastern Cape
- In office May 1994 – June 1999

Personal details
- Born: Nocwaka Emsie Vantyi; 19 April 1931 Pirie Mission, King William's Town; Cape Province, Union of South Africa
- Died: 17 November 2021 (aged 90) Gqeberha, Eastern Cape; Republic of South Africa
- Party: African National Congress
- Spouse: Alfred Zilindile Lamani (died 1991)
- Children: 4, including Tango

Nocwaka Emsie Lamani (née Vantyi; 19 April 1931 – 17 November 2021) was a South African politician and activist. She represented the African National Congress (ANC) in the National Council of Provinces from 1994 to 1999 and in the National Assembly from 2001 to 2004. During apartheid, she was a prominent community activist in Port Elizabeth.

== Early life and career ==
Lamani was born on 19 April 1931 at Pirie Mission outside King William's Town in the former Cape Province. Her father, Isaac Vantyi, was a farmer, and she was the 12th of 13 siblings. In 1953, she left the Cape to enrol for training as a nurse at McCord Hospital in Durban. After completing her studies in 1960, she moved to Port Elizabeth, where she lived with her sister in New Brighton and worked as a nursing sister at New Brighton Clinic. She helped her husband manage his funeral parlour and ultimately retired from nursing to help him manage a petrol station he bought in Zwide township.

By that time, Lamani was active in anti-apartheid community organising in the area. Among other organisations, in the 1980s she was a member of the Port Elizabeth Women's Organisation (the women's wing of the Port Elizabeth Black Civic Organisation) and of the United Democratic Front. She became a member of the executive committee of the ANC Women's League in 1990.

== Legislative career: 1994–2004 ==
In South Africa's first post-apartheid elections in 1994, she was elected to the Senate (later the National Council of Provinces), representing the Eastern Cape constituency. In the next general election in 1999, she stood for election to the Eastern Cape Provincial Legislature, but she was not ranked high enough on the party list to secure election. However, on 3 July 2001, she was sworn in to a seat in the National Assembly, filling the casual vacancy that arose from Serake Leeuw's resignation. She retired after the 2004 general election.

== Personal life and death ==
Lamani was married to Alfred Zilindile "AZ" Lamani, who died in 1991. They had four children, one of whom, Tango Lamani, was a prominent student activist during apartheid. She died on 17 November 2021 in hospital in Gqeberha (Port Elizabeth) after a long illness.
