= Lesiba Mothiba =

South African politician and traditional leader (1937–2013)

Member of the National Assembly
- In office 20 February 2001 – April 2004

Personal details
- Born: Lesiba Christopher Mothiba; 17 August 1937
- Died: 20 July 2013 (aged 75)
- Citizenship: South Africa
- Party: African National Congress (since March 2003)
- Other political affiliations: United Democratic Movement (until March 2003)

Lesiba Christopher Mothiba (17 August 1937 – 20 July 2013) was a South African politician and traditional leader. He rose to prominence during apartheid as a politician in Lebowa and the leader of the GaMothiba traditional authority in present-day Polokwane, Limpopo. He later served in the post-apartheid National Assembly from 2001 to 2004, representing the United Democratic Movement (UDM) until he crossed the floor to the African National Congress (ANC) in 2003.

== Life and career ==
Mothiba was born on 17 August 1937 and held a BAdmin degree. After beginning his career as a civil servant and salesman, he joined the Lebowa Legislative Assembly in 1973 and served as a minister in the Lebowa government. He also owned a bottle store and petrol station in Sebayeng.

Lebowa was disbanded upon the end of apartheid. In the 1999 general election, Mothiba stood as a UDM candidate for election to the National Assembly. Though he was not initially elected, he was sworn in on 20 February 2001, filling the casual vacancy created by Manna Naidoo's resignation. During the March 2003 floor-crossing window, Mothiba was among the UDM representatives who resigned from the party and joined the governing ANC. He served the rest of the parliamentary term under the ANC's banner.

In addition to his political activities, Mothiba was the traditional leader of GaMothiba in present-day Polokwane Local Municipality, a hereditary lifetime appointment that he held for more than three decades. He died on 20 July 2013 after a short illness.
