= Mbongeni Ngubeni =

South African politician

Member of the National Assembly
- In office June 1999 – April 2004

Personal details
- Born: Jan Mbongeni Ngubeni; 6 April 1961 (age 65)
- Citizenship: South Africa
- Party: African National Congress
- Other political affiliations: South African National Civics Organisation

Jan Mbongeni Ngubeni (born 6 April 1961) is a South African politician who represented the African National Congress (ANC) in the National Assembly from 1999 to 2004. At the time of his election, he was general secretary of the South African National Civics Organisation (SANCO).

== Career in SANCO ==
Ngubeni was born on 6 April 1961. He rose to political prominence through SANCO, where he was head of democratisation and governance in the mid-1990s. He was later elected as SANCO's third general secretary, serving under President Mlungisi Hlongwane. He held the secretariat until April 2001, when he was succeeded by Dan Mofokeng.

Mofokeng later resigned from the position during an internal squabble about an investigation into the alleged misuse of SANCO funds, in which Ngubeni was implicated. SANCO treasurer Godfrey Jack alleged that Ngubeni and Hlongwane had misappropriated parts of a R1.3 million donation received by SANCO from the ANC in 1998. According to Jack, much of the money was withdrawn in cash, some by Ngubeni. Ngubeni and Hlogwane conceded to Jack's further claim that they had used some of the money to buy luxury cars, although they said that the purchases had been made "under Sanco's car scheme for use by full-time staff".

== Parliament ==
While in his SANCO office, Ngubeni was elected to the National Assembly, representing the ANC, in the 1999 general election. He remained in the seat after vacating the SANCO office and served a single term, leaving after the 2004 general election.
