= Khatliso Moeketse =

South African politician

Member of the National Assembly
- In office June 1999 – April 2004
- Constituency: Free State

Personal details
- Born: Khatliso Mishack Moeketse; 26 February 1965 (age 61)
- Citizenship: South Africa
- Party: African National Congress

Khatliso Mishack Moeketse (born 26 February 1965) is a South African politician who represented the African National Congress (ANC) in the National Assembly from 1999 to 2004. He gained election narrowly in 1999, standing on the ANC's party list for the Free State. He is also a former chairperson of the ANC Youth League in the Free State.

In 2000, Moeketse and fellow MP John Ncinane became the first politicians implicated in the abuse of parliamentary travel vouchers, in an early precursor to the Travelgate scandal. Moeketse reportedly admitted to a newspaper that he had sold air tickets – paid for by Parliament as work expenses – to friends and their spouses. He was formally reprimanded by the Speaker of the National Assembly, Frene Ginwala, though the reprimand was postponed several times as Moeketse took sick leave.
