= Rolson Moropa =

South African politician (born 1960)

Member of the National Assembly
- In office 1 May 2000 – April 2004
- Constituency: Mpumalanga

Personal details
- Born: Rolson Mathabathe Moropa; 4 January 1960 (age 66)
- Citizenship: South Africa
- Party: African National Congress

Rolson Mathabathe Moropa (born 4 January 1960) is a South African politician and civil servant who represented the African National Congress (ANC) in the National Assembly from 2000 to 2004. He joined the assembly on 1 May 2000, filling the casual vacancy that arose in the ANC's Mpumalanga caucus after Mthunzi Vilakazi died. At that time, he was also chairperson of the ANC's branch in Nelspruit.

Moropa later served as secretary of the Mpumalanga Provincial Legislature, at that time led by Speaker Pinky Phosa.
