= Olaf Baloyi =

South African politician and civil servant

Member of the National Assembly
- In office 1 April 2001 – August 2002
- Constituency: KwaZulu-Natal

Personal details
- Citizenship: South Africa
- Party: Inkatha Freedom Party

Olaf Baloyi is a South African politician and civil servant. He represented the Inkatha Freedom Party (IFP) in the National Assembly from 2001 to 2002, serving the KwaZulu-Natal constituency. Thereafter he was a member of the KwaZulu-Natal Provincial Legislature from 2002 to 2004.

== Political career ==
Before entering legislative politics, Baloyi was a deputy director-general in the KwaZulu-Natal Department of Health. He was not initially elected to the National Assembly in the 1999 general election but he joined during the legislative term; he was sworn in on 1 April 2001 to fill the casual vacancy arising from Buyisiwe Nzimande's resignation. He also headed the IFP's directorate on HIV/AIDS.

In June 2002, the Mail & Guardian reported that Baloyi was likely to be transferred from the National Assembly to the KwaZulu-Natal Provincial Legislature; with a floor-crossing window approaching and the IFP in danger of losing its control of the province, it planned to ensure that its provincial caucus was peopled with maximally loyally members. Indeed, in August 2002, Baloyi resigned from the National Assembly and, on 13 August, he was sworn in to the provincial legislature. He left after the 2004 general election.
