= Lanval Reid =

South African politician

Member of the National Assembly
- In office 23 April 2004 – May 2009

Personal details
- Citizenship: South Africa
- Party: African National Congress

Lanval Roderick Robin Reid is a South African politician who represented the African National Congress (ANC) in the National Assembly from 2004 to 2009. He was elected to his seat in the 2004 general election and served on the Portfolio Committee on Sports and Recreation. Prior to his election he had been a regional organiser for the ANC in the Southern Cape.
