= Jakob Kgarimetsa =

South African politician (1949–2021)

Member of the National Assembly
- In office June 1999 – April 2004
- Constituency: North West

Personal details
- Born: 14 September 1949
- Died: February 2021 (aged 71)
- Citizenship: South Africa
- Party: African National Congress

Jakoba Jakob Kgarimetsa (14 September 1949 – February 2021) was a South African politician who represented the African National Congress (ANC) in the National Assembly for a single term from 1999 to 2004. He was elected in 1999 and represented the North West constituency. After leaving Parliament at the 2004 general election, he served as a local councillor and member of the mayoral committee in Bojanala Platinum District Municipality. He died in February 2021.
