= Teresa Millin =

South African politician (born 1941)

Member of the National Assembly
- In office March 2003 – April 2004

Member of the KwaZulu-Natal Legislature
- In office June 1999 – March 2003

Personal details
- Born: 1 March 1941 (age 85)
- Citizenship: South Africa
- Party: Independent African Movement (since March 2003)
- Other party: Inkatha Freedom Party (until March 2003)

Teresa Millin (born 1 March 1941) is a retired South African politician who served in the KwaZulu-Natal Legislature from 1999 to 2003 and in the National Assembly from 2003 to 2004. She represented the Inkatha Freedom Party until March 2003, when she established her own party, the Independent African Movement.

== Legislative career ==
In the 1999 general election, Millin was elected to a seat in the KwaZulu-Natal Legislature, where her party, the IFP, formed a government. She was deputy chief whip in the legislature until 2002, when she was demoted after her husband made disparaging comments about the IFP in the media.

In early March 2003, the IFP announced a reshuffle of its legislative caucus that would see Millin and two other provincial legislators move to seats in the National Assembly. While the party said that its aim was to reinforce its administrative capacity ahead of the 2004 general election, it was widely assumed that its immediate motive was to protect its plurality in the KwaZulu-Natal Legislature by removing legislators who were suspected of planning to cross the floor. Millin, in particular, was suspected of planning to join the African Christian Democratic Party (ACDP).

Indeed, when the 2003 floor-crossing window opened in late March, Millin announced her resignation from the IFP. She did not cross the ACDP but instead to her own, new party, the African Independent Movement (later renamed the Independent African Movement). She said that the new party would follow Christian principles and seek to represent the "taxpaying middle class". She served the rest of the legislative term in the National Assembly under the movement's banner, but she did not return to Parliament after the 2004 general election.

== Personal life ==
She is married to Peter Millin and has children.
