= Ntshadi Tsheole =

South African politician and businesswoman

Member of the National Assembly
- In office 21 June 1999 – April 2004
- Constituency: Limpopo
- In office May 1994 – June 1999

Personal details
- Citizenship: South Africa
- Party: African National Congress

Ntshadi Martha Tsheole is a South African politician, businesswoman, and former diplomat who represented the African National Congress (ANC) in the National Assembly from 1994 to 2004, excepting a brief hiatus in 1999. She was first elected in the 1994 general election. Though she was not initially re-elected in the 1999 general election, she was restored to her seat shortly after the election, on 21 June, after Lawrence Mushwana resigned.

After leaving Parliament, Tsheole served as South African High Commissioner to Malawi and later to Cameroon. After retiring from diplomacy, she became involved in social entrepreneurship in Moruleng in the North West.
