= Dimakatso Morobi =

South African politician (born 1941)

Member of the National Assembly
- In office June 1999 – May 2009

Personal details
- Born: 6 July 1941 (age 84)
- Citizenship: South Africa
- Party: African National Congress

Dimakatso Martha Morobi (born 6 July 1941) was a retired South African politician who represented the African National Congress (ANC) in the National Assembly from 1999 to 2009. She was elected in 1999 to serve the Gauteng constituency and was re-elected in 2004 from the ANC's national party list. During her second term, she was a member of Parliament's Joint Monitoring Committee on the Improvement of the Quality of Life and Status of Women.
