= Pierre-Jeanne Gerber =

South African politician

Member of the National Assembly
- In office June 1999 – June 2009

Personal details
- Born: 1961 or 1962 (age 63–64)
- Citizenship: South Africa
- Party: African National Congress

Pierre-Jeanne Alexander Gerber (born 1961 or 1962) is a South African politician and property investor who represented the African National Congress (ANC) in the National Assembly from 1999 to 2009.

== Early life and career ==
Gerber was born in 1962. His grandparents were bywoners (Afrikaans for tenant farmers) and his father was a minister for the Dutch Reformed Church (NGK). He became determined to own property at an early age and worked on weekends at a shop to save up to buy his first property – in Ashton in the Cape Province – by the time he was 11. By 1999, he owned 255 properties across four provinces in South Africa.

== Political career ==
On 14 January 1996 the national newspaper Rapport published an article, based on leaked party documents, that reported that the National Party sought to disband. It was later revealed that the former Nationalist member of Parliament for False Bay, Adriaan Jordaan, leaked the documents to the paper, but that Gerber, who at the time was the Federal Youth Leader in the NP and therefore sat on the party's Federal Council, gave Jordaan the documents.

Gerber represented the New National Party in the Western Cape Provincial Parliament after 1994 but resigned to join the ANC in April 1999, during the run-up to the 1999 general election. In that election he was elected to an ANC seat in the National Assembly, the lower house of the South African Parliament; he was elected to a second five-year term in the next general election in 2004.

== Personal life ==
As of 2025, Gerber s married and have four daughters.
