= Welsh Makanda =

South African politician (born 1934)

Member of the National Assembly
- In office 2 August 2001 – April 2004

Personal details
- Born: Welsh Ginyibulu Makanda; 20 May 1934
- Citizenship: South Africa
- Party: African National Congress (since April 2003)
- Other political affiliations: United Democratic Movement (until April 2003)

Welsh Ginyibulu Makanda (born 20 May 1934) is a retired South African politician and diplomat. A former anti-apartheid activist, he served in the National Assembly from 2001 to 2004. He represented the United Democratic Movement (UDM) until he crossed the floor to the African National Congress (ANC) in 2003.

== Political career ==
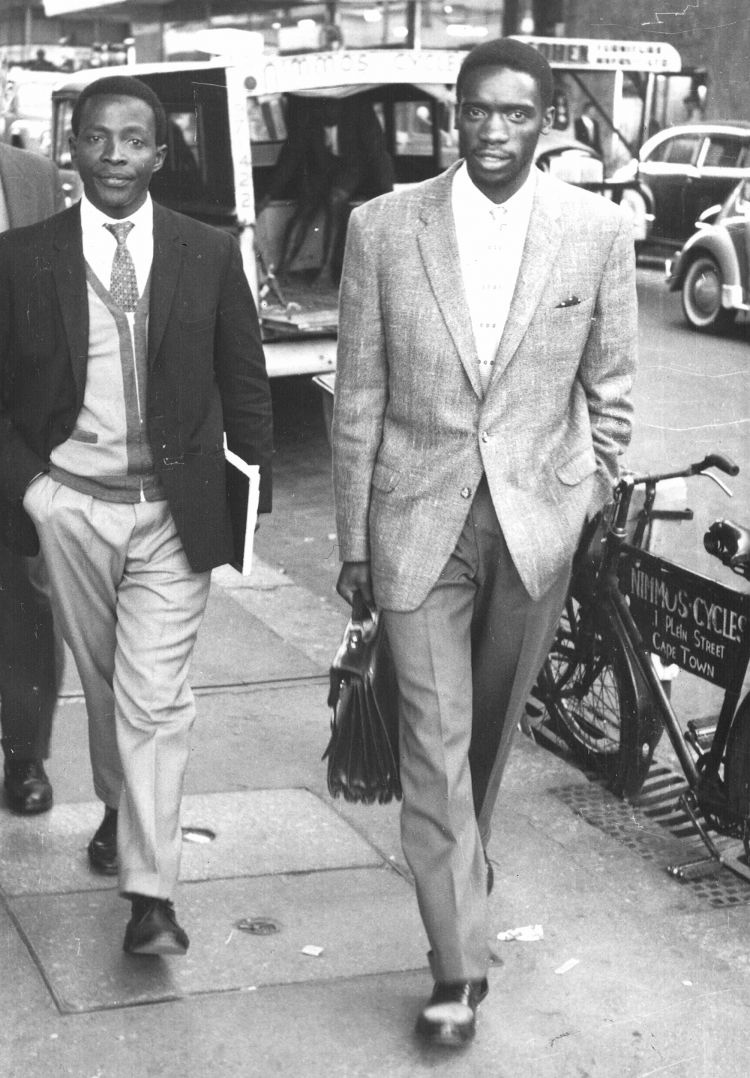
Makanda (left) in Cape Town with Archie Mafeje, August 1961

In the 1999 general election, Makanda stood as a UDM candidate for election to the National Assembly. Though he was not initially elected to a seat, he was sworn in on 2 August 2001, replacing Sipo Mzimela. On 1 April 2003, during that month's floor-crossing window, Makanda was among the UDM representatives who resigned from the party and joined the governing ANC. He served the rest of the parliamentary term under the ANC's banner.

After leaving Parliament, Makanda served as South African Ambassador to the Democratic Republic of Congo.
