= Bukelwa Mbulawa =

South African politician (born 1954)

Member of the National Assembly
- In office until April 2004

Personal details
- Born: 19 April 1954 (age 71)
- Citizenship: South Africa
- Party: African National Congress (since March 1999)
- Other political affiliations: Democratic Party (until March 1999)

Bukelwa Gilberta Mbulawa-Hans (born 19 April 1954) is a South African politician and the first black woman to represent the DP in the National Assembly. Mbulawa is from the Eastern Cape and served in the National Assembly until 2004. She represented the Democratic Party (DP) until March 1999, when she defected to the African National Congress (ANC), she left parliament in April 2004.

== Political career ==
During the first democratic Parliament, Mbulawa became the first black woman to represent the DP in the National Assembly. However, in March 1999, she announced that she would defect to the ANC; she therefore resigned from her DP seat and was sworn in to an ANC one. In her first speech to the National Assembly afterwards, she described the DP as follows:

They are the new custodians of popular right-wing politics. The protectors of the old order. The promoters of historic injustice. The prophets of the past. Their only camouflage is their magical phrase, 'liberalism'.

Mbulawa was re-elected to a full-term in the National Assembly under the ANC's banner in the 1999 general election. She left Parliament after the 2004 general election, in which she was ranked in unelectable position on the ANC's party list.
