= Pierre de Vos (politician) =

South African politician (born 1931)

Member of the National Assembly
- In office June 1999 – 12 June 2000
- Constituency: Free State

Personal details
- Born: Pierre Jacobus de Vos; 3 July 1931 (age 94)
- Citizenship: South Africa
- Party: Democratic Party

Pierre Jacobus de Vos (born 3 July 1931) is a retired South African politician who represented the Democratic Party (DP) in the National Assembly from 1999 to 2000. With Andries Botha, he was elected in the 1999 general election as one of the DP's two representatives in the Free State caucus. He left his seat on 12 June 2000 and was replaced by Roy Jankielsohn.
