= Arthur Lyle =

South African politician (born 1949)

Member of the National Assembly
- In office June 1999 – April 2004
- Constituency: Northern Province

Personal details
- Born: Arthur Gilbert Lyle; 23 November 1949 (age 76)
- Citizenship: South Africa
- Party: African National Congress

Arthur Gilbert Lyle (born 23 November 1949) is a South African politician who represented the African National Congress (ANC) in the National Assembly from 1999 to 2009, gaining election in 1999. He represented the Northern Province constituency in present-day Limpopo.
