= Lucas Mbadi =

South African politician and academic (born 1931)

Member of the National Assembly
- In office June 1999 – April 2004
- Constituency: Eastern Cape

Personal details
- Born: 20 September 1931 (age 94)
- Citizenship: South Africa
- Party: African National Congress (since April 2003)
- Other political affiliations: United Democratic Movement (until April 2003)

Lucas Mbadi (born 20 September 1931) is a retired South African politician and academic. He served in the National Assembly from 1999 to 2004, representing the United Democratic Movement (UDM) until April 2003, when he crossed the floor to the African National Congress (ANC).

== Life and career ==
Born on 20 September 1931, Mbadi was formerly a professor at the University of Transkei in the present-day Eastern Cape. In the 1999 general election, he was narrowly elected to a UDM seat in the Eastern Cape caucus of the National Assembly. On 1 April 2003, during that month's floor-crossing window, he was among the UDM representatives who resigned from the party and joined the governing ANC. He served the rest of the parliamentary term under the ANC's banner.
