= David Dlali =

South African politician (1960–2012)

Member of the National Assembly
- In office 4 September 2001 – May 2009

Personal details
- Born: 23 January 1960 Mount Frere, Cape Province; Union of South Africa
- Died: 10 June 2012 (aged 52) Cedarville, Eastern Cape
- Citizenship: South Africa
- Party: African National Congress

David Mtheteleli Dali (23 January 1960 – 10 June 2012) was a South African politician who represented the African National Congress (ANC) in the National Assembly from 2001 to 2009. A former Umkhonto we Sizwe operative, he subsequently served as a special adviser to Lulu Xingwana, the Minister of Women, Children and People with Disabilities, from 2009 until June 2012, when he was shot dead on his farm in the Eastern Cape.

== Early life and activism ==
Dlali was born on 23 January 1960 in Mount Frere in the former Cape Province. During apartheid, he was recruited into the ANC by Mcebisi Skwatsha and became an underground operative for Umkhonto we Sizwe. After the end of apartheid, he remained active in the ANC, chairing the party's regional branch in Cape Town and serving as a member of its Provincial Executive Committee.

== Parliament: 2001–2009 ==
On 4 September 2001, Dlali was sworn into an ANC seat in the National Assembly, filling a casual vacancy that had arisen after Andrew Feinstein's resignation. He was elected to a full term in the legislature in the next general election in 2004. The Mail & Guardian said that he was viewed as "a hardliner", with particularly strong views in favour of land reform and land expropriation.

After the 2009 general election, Dlali did not return to Parliament but instead was appointed as special adviser to Lulu Xingwana, the Minister of Women, Children and People with Disabilities. He was serving in that position at the time of his death in 2011.

== Personal life and death ==
Dlali owned farmland near Cedarville in the Eastern Cape. He died of a gunshot wound on 10 June 2012 and was found in the back of his bakkie on his farm in the early hours of the next morning. Although there was initially speculation about whether the killing was politically motivated or a so-called farm murder, the police announced that they had arrested two of Dlali's own employees, 22-year old farm manager Simthembile Jakalase and a shepherd of around the same age. The police had also recovered R5,000 in cash and an AK47, presumed to belong to Dlali. The Mail & Guardian later reported that Jakalase was Dlali's son.
