= Percylia Mothoagae =

South African politician

Member of the National Assembly
- In office 24 June 1999 – April 2004
- Constituency: North West

Delegate to the National Council of Provinces

Assembly Member for North West
- In office May 1994 – June 1999

Personal details
- Born: 14 January 1955 (age 71)
- Citizenship: South Africa
- Party: African National Congress

Percylia Kereng Mothoagae (born 14 January 1955) is a South African politician from the North West. She represented the African National Congress (ANC) in Parliament from 1994 to 2004.

Mothogae joined Parliament in the 1994 general election, when she was elected to join the North West caucus of the Senate (later the National Council of Provinces). In the next general election in 1999, she stood for election to the National Assembly, but narrowly failed to gain a seat. She was sworn in shortly after the election, on 24 June 1999, when Enver Surty vacated his seat. From January 2001 onwards, she was a member of the Standing Committee on Public Accounts. She left Parliament after the 2004 general election.
