= Monontsi Mzondeki =

South African politician

Member of the National Assembly
- In office June 1999 – May 2009

Personal details
- Citizenship: South Africa
- Party: African National Congress

Monontsi Joseph George Mzondeki is a South African politician and businessman who represented the African National Congress (ANC) in the National Assembly from 1999 to 2009. During that period, he retained business interests; in 2006, for example, he acquired a stake in President Steyn Gold Mines through a black economic empowerment deal. In the 2014 general election, he stood for election to the Free State Provincial Legislature. Still, he was ranked 27th on the ANC's provincial party list and did not secure a seat.
