= Johann Durand (politician) =

South African politician (born 1954)

Member of the National Assembly
- In office June 1999 – April 2004
- Constituency: Gauteng

Personal details
- Born: 1 January 1954 (age 72)
- Citizenship: South Africa
- Party: New National Party; National Party

Johann Durand (born 1 January 1954) is a South African politician from Gauteng. He represented the New National Party (NNP) in the National Assembly from 1999 to 2004.

== Early life and career ==
Born on 1 January 1954, Durand was formerly a local politician in Pretoria. He is Coloured.

== Legislative career ==
Durand was elected to the National Assembly in the 1999 general election, serving the Gauteng constituency. He served as the NNP's spokesman on correctional services during the legislative term that followed. In the next general election in 2004, the NNP performed extremely poorly, and Durand was among those who lost his seat.

In the aftermath of the 2004 election, Durand was appointed as director for administration in the ministerial office of NNP leader Marthinus van Schalkwyk, who had been appointed as Minister of Environmental Affairs and Tourism. The Democratic Alliance complained that the appointment displayed "blatant nepotism".
