= Farouk Cassim =

South African politician

Member of the National Assembly
- In office May 1994 – June 2003

Personal details
- Born: Stanger, Natal Province; Union of South Africa
- Party: Congress of the People
- Other political affiliations: Peace and Justice Congress (2003); Inkatha Freedom Party (1994–2003)
- Education: University of South Africa

Mahomed Farouk Cassim is a South African politician who served in the National Assembly and in the apartheid-era House of Delegates. After leaving the National Assembly in 2003, he joined the Congress of the People (COPE) and represented COPE as a local councillor in the City of Cape Town.

Cassim represented the Inkatha Freedom Party (IFP) in the National Assembly from 1994 until March 2003, when he crossed the floor to the Peace and Justice Congress (PJC). In June 2003, following a dispute with the PJC, he resigned from Parliament and as Deputy Chairperson of Committees.

== Early life and career ==
Cassim is from Stanger in the former Natal province. He has a master's degree from the University of South Africa and wrote his dissertation about the poetry of Ezra Pound.

Designated as Indian under apartheid, he served in the House of Delegates, the Indian house of the Tricameral Parliament. According to the Mail & Guardian, in 1992 he memorably got into a physical scuffle with his colleague Amichand Rajbansi in the corridors of the House. Mark Gevisser said that Cassim "was, by all accounts, far and away the most able politician in the House of Delegates".

== National Assembly ==
=== Inkatha Freedom Party: 1994–2003 ===
Ahead of South Africa's first non-racial elections in 1994, Cassim joined the IFP. He said that he was attracted to the IFP's support for federalism; according to Richard Calland, he was also a staunch supporter of constituency-based parliamentary representation. In the 1994 election, he was elected to an IFP seat in the National Assembly, the lower house of the new South African Parliament. He was re-elected to a second term in the 1999 general election, and during his second term he was appointed as Deputy Chairperson of Committees as a result of an agreement between the IFP and the governing African National Congress (ANC). He was also a member of the IFP's national council.

In 1995, Cassim caused a minor stir by calling a press conference at which he accused the IFP of a tendency towards racism against Indians. IFP Secretary-General Ziba Jiyane called for him to "apologise or resign" or else face disciplinary charges. Cassim said that he would not apologise as "a matter of conscience", saying of racist tendencies that "we need to pick it up now and smash it before it becomes entrenched".

=== Peace and Justice Congress: 2003 ===
Although Cassim remained with the IFP thereafter, in advance of the 2003 floor-crossing period, the Mail & Guardian reported that Cassim had "shown some interest" in defecting to the African National Congress (ANC). Cassim strongly denied this in a letter to the editor. However, when the floor-crossing period began in March 2003, Cassim announced that he would leave the IFP – not for the ANC but to a new party, the PJC. He served as the party's sole representative in Parliament and therefore as its de facto caucus leader.

Within months, his relationship with the PJC had soured. In mid-June 2003, the Speaker of the National Assembly, Frene Ginwala, announced that Cassim had resigned both from the Deputy Chairperson position and from his legislative seat. It later transpired that he had lost his seat because he had been expelled from the party and that he intended to challenge his expulsion in court. Among other things, Cassim and his party were involved in a dispute over the composition of the party list – which included many of Cassim's relatives, including his daughter, Shenaz – and over the alleged unauthorised use of funds by Cassim. The party leadership also alleged that Cassim had challenged the party's principles, including its support for capital punishment and its campaign to abolish interest payments.

Cassim was not re-elected to Parliament in the 2004 general election, and by 2010 he had joined COPE. In the 2014 general election, he stood unsuccessfully for election to Parliament under COPE's banner, ranked ninth on the party's national party list.

== Local government ==
In the 2016 local elections, Cassim stood as COPE's candidate for election as Mayor of Cape Town. Though not elected to the mayoral office, he represented COPE in the City of Cape Town Council for the next five years and stood again as COPE's mayoral candidate in the 2021 local elections.

== Personal life ==
Cassim is married. His wife is a first cousin of Kader Asmal.
