= Ronald Mofokeng =

South African politician and trade unionist (1947–2020)

Member of the National Assembly
- In office June 1999 – May 2009

Personal details
- Born: Tsokudu Ronald Mofokeng; 21 May 1947 Bethlehem, Orange Free State; Union of South Africa
- Died: 4 July 2020 (aged 73)
- Party: African National Congress
- Other political affiliations: South African Communist Party

Tsokudu Ronald Mofokeng (21 May 1947 – 4 July 2020) was a South African politician and trade unionist. He was the national treasurer of the Congress of South African Trade Unions (COSATU) from 1987 until 1999, when the union nominated him for election to the National Assembly. He served two terms in the assembly from 1999 to 2009, representing the African National Congress (ANC).

== Early life and union career ==
Mofokeng was born on 21 May 1947 in Bethlehem in the former Orange Free State. He entered the labour movement in 1971, when he was elected chairperson of a liaison committee at his workplace, PG Glass in Germiston. The committee was involved in founding the Glass and Allied Workers' Union (GAWU). GAWU later merged with the Chemical Workers' Industrial Union (CWIU), an affiliate of the Federation of South African Trade Unions, and Mofokeng was elected treasurer of CWIU in 1981.

When COSATU was formed in 1985, Mofokeng became a prominent figure in the congress. He served as a COSATU regional treasurer until 1987, when he was elected national treasurer. He remained in that office throughout the 1990s, leaving only after he was elected to Parliament in June 1999. He had declined an earlier nomination to stand for Parliament in the 1994 general election, preferring to remain with the labour movement.

In tandem with his union activism, Mofokeng was involved in anti-apartheid organising. He also joined the South African Communist Party (SACP) during the democratic transition.

== Legislative career ==
In the 1999 general election, Mofokeng was nominated to stand on the ANC's party list by COSATU, which was represented on the list within the framework of the Tripartite Alliance. He was a member of the Gauteng caucus during his first term but won re-election to his second term from the ANC's national list in 2004. He served for a period as chairperson of Parliament's Portfolio Committee on Minerals and Energy, and he was also a member of the Standing Committee on Public Accounts.

== Death ==
Mofokeng died on 4 July 2020.
