= Nomhle Mahlawe =

South African politician (born 1941)

Member of the National Assembly
- In office 16 February 2001 – 2009
- Constituency: Eastern Cape

Personal details
- Born: 19 February 1941 (age 85)
- Citizenship: South Africa
- Party: Congress of the People (since 2009)
- Other party: African National Congress (until 2009)

Nomhle Maria Mahlawe (born 19 February 1941) is a South African politician. She represented the African National Congress (ANC) in the National Assembly from 2001 to 2009 and before that in the Eastern Cape Provincial Legislature. She defected to the rival Congress of the People (COPE) in 2009.

== Political career ==
Before joining the national Parliament, Mahlawe was a member of the Eastern Cape Provincial Legislature. She left the province on 16 February 2001, when she was sworn in to an ANC seat in the Eastern Cape caucus of the National Assembly; she replaced Rosemary Capa, who had left her seat after the December 2000 local elections. Mahlawe was re-elected to a full term in the National Assembly in the 2004 general election.

Ahead of the 2009 general election, Mahlawe left the ANC for COPE, a new breakaway opposition party. She stood under COPE's banner for re-election to the National Assembly, now in the KwaZulu-Natal caucus, but she was not elected. Mahlawe nonetheless remained active in COPE, serving as a spokesperson for the party and as its deputy provincial secretary in KwaZulu-Natal. After the party split between supporters of Sam Shilowa and supporters of Mosiuoa Lekota, Mahlawe firmly aligned herself to the latter camp.
