= Mannetjies Grobler =

South African politician

Member of the National Assembly
- In office June 1999 – April 2004
- Constituency: Gauteng

Personal details
- Born: 25 June 1941 (age 84)
- Citizenship: South Africa
- Party: Democratic Alliance; Democratic Party

Godfried Augus Josephes "Mannetjies" Grobler (born 25 June 1941) is a retired South African politician who represented the Democratic Party (DP) in the National Assembly from 1999 to 2004. He served the Gauteng constituency.

== Life and career ==
Grobler was born on 25 June 1941. He gained election to the National Assembly in the 1999 general election as a DP candidate for the Gauteng constituency. In 2000, the DP co-founded the Democratic Alliance (DA), a multi-party coalition of opposition parties, and DA leader Tony Leon appointed Grobler as the coalition's spokesman on public service and administration. He later served as spokesman on local government.

In the 2004 general election, the DP was fully absorbed into the DA, and Grobler stood for re-election to his seat under the DA's banner. He was ranked 20th on the DA's regional party list for Gauteng and did not secure re-election.
