= Nick Clelland =

South African politician

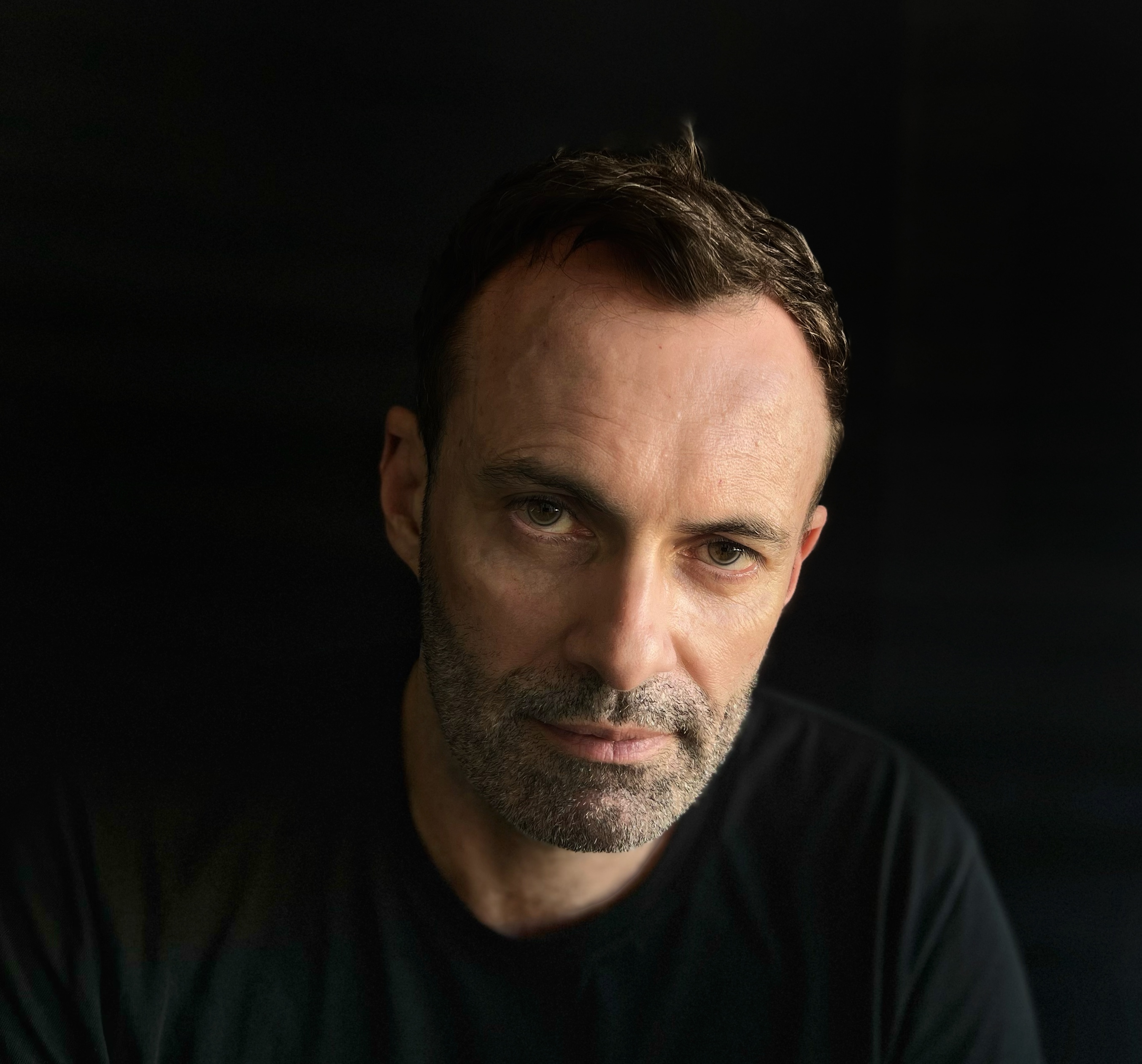
Nick Clelland in 2024

Nicholas John Clelland (born 25 February 1972) is a South African author and former politician.

== Author ==
Clelland’s debut novel, Good Hope was published by Karavan Press in April 2024. A dystopian, political thriller, the novel asks questions around the precariousness of statehood and the conflict between security and freedom. Geordin Hill-Lewis, Executive Mayor of Cape Town, on the cover of the book, describes the novel as a "Riveting read and a scary glimpse into what happens when liberty is traded for order." Good Hope was shortlisted for the 2025 South African Literary Awards and for the 2025 National Institute for the Humanities and Social Sciences Award. It was longlisted for the 2025 Sunday Times Literary Awards.

Clelland has also written a non-fiction book with Ryan Coetzee titled Spin – The art of managing the media (2018 Penguin Books).

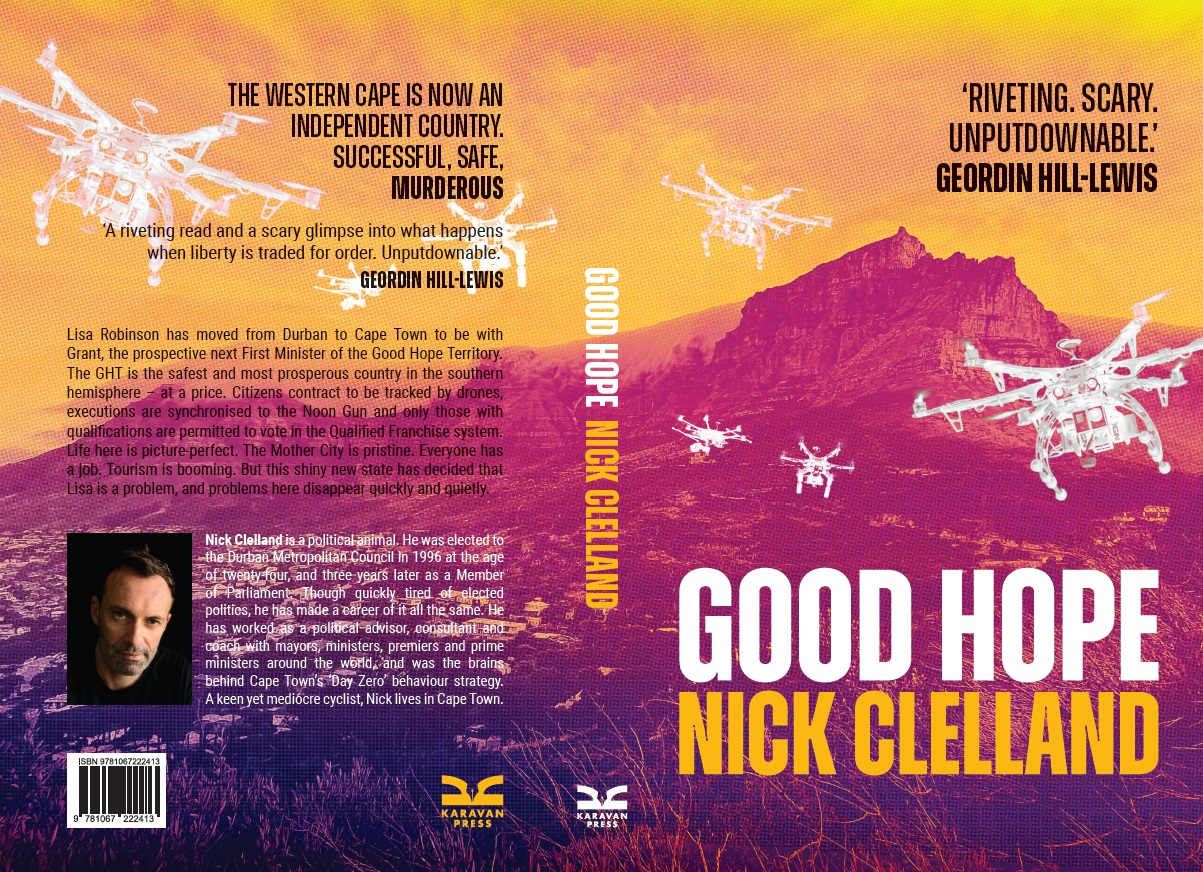
The cover of Good Hope (2024)

== Political career ==
Clelland was elected to the Durban Metropolitan Council in 1996. He was then elected as a Democratic Party Member of Parliament in 1999 at the age of 27, making him one of South Africa's youngest Members of Parliament. Clelland served as Parliamentary Counsellor to the Leader of the Opposition and as the Democratic Alliance's first National Spokesperson. On an oversight trip to Zimbabwe, with Tony Leon after the February 2000 referendum on the draft constitution, then ZANU–PF Justice Minister Patrick Chinamasa characterised their trip as interference in Zimbabwe's domestic affairs and treacherous.

In 2007, in New Zealand, Clelland was appointed chief of staff to Auckland mayor John Banks. Returning to South Africa in 2009, then Western Cape Minister of Transport, Robin Carlisle, appointed Clelland as his chief of staff where he conceptualised and launched the government's Safely Home road safety campaign that, ultimately, achieved a 25.9% reduction in fatalities in two and a half years.

In 2010 Clelland took up the role of director of strategic communication for the Western Cape Government. In this position – together with Dan Ariely – he devised and designed a behavioural economics pilot on HIV testing which saw a 30% increase in monthly HIV testing figures.

== Communications professional ==
Former DA Leader, Tony Leon and Clelland founded Resolve Communications (Pty) Ltd in 2013 where he served as its chief executive officer until October 2018 when he was succeeded by Gavin Davis. Clelland is credited with defining and developing the “Day Zero” concept and campaign during the 2017/2018 water crisis in Cape Town which was used, with great effect, to change and to sustain reduction in water consumption. Clelland is the Principal of Government Guild, a training and development consultancy.
