= Jackson Hlaneki =

South African politician and traditional leader (1944–2015)

Member of the National Assembly
- In office June 1999 – April 2004
- Constituency: Limpopo

Personal details
- Born: Chabane Jackson Maluleke Hlaneki; 2 January 1944
- Died: 20 November 2015 (aged 71)
- Citizenship: South Africa
- Party: African National Congress

Chabane Jackson Maluleke Hlaneki (born 2 January 1944 – 20 November 2015) was a South African politician and Tsonga traditional leader. He represented the African National Congress (ANC) in the National Assembly from 1999 to 2004 and was leader of the Hlaneki tribal authority from 1979 until his death in 2015.

== Life and career ==
Hlaneki was born on 2 January 1944. In 1979, he became chief ("hosi") of the Hlaneki tribal authority in Giyani in the former Northern Transvaal (now Limpopo). It was a lifetime hereditary appointment.

In the 1999 general election, he was elected to represent the ANC in the National Assembly, serving the Limpopo constituency. He served a single term and left after the 2004 general election.

He died on 20 November 2015 and was succeeded as hosi by his eldest son.
