= Boy Nobunga =

South African politician and civil servant

Member of the National Assembly
- In office 3 July 2001 – April 2004

Personal details
- Born: Boy Johannes Nobunga; 9 November 1962 (age 63)
- Citizenship: South Africa
- Party: African National Congress
- Education: University of the Western Cape

Boy Johannes Nobunga (born 9 November 1962) is a South African politician and civil servant from Mpumalanga. Between 1994 and 2009, he represented the African National Congress (ANC) in the Mpumalanga Provincial Legislature and both houses of Parliament.

From 2017 to 2022, he was chief executive officer of the Mpumalanga Tourism and Parks Agency. He is also a former member of the Provincial Executive Committee of the ANC's Mpumalanga branch.

== Early life and education ==
Nobunga was born on 9 November 1962. He has bachelor of commerce and honours degrees from the University of the Western Cape.

== Legislative career: 1994–2009 ==
Nobunga represented the ANC as a legislator from 1994 to 2009. He began his career in the Senate, where he was elected to the Eastern Transvaal caucus in the 1994 general election. He was subsequently transferred to the Mpumalanga Provincial Legislature, and he was elected to a full term in the legislature in the 1999 general election.

However, on 3 July 2001, he was sworn in to a seat in the National Assembly, where he filled the casual vacancy arising from Priscilla Jana's resignation. His transfer back to the national Parliament was described by media as a "purge", because he and some of the others moved were viewed as Mpumalanga Premier Ndaweni Mahlangu's most outspoken critics.

Nobunga served in the National Assembly until the 2004 general election, when he was returned to the Mpumalanga Provincial Legislature. During the legislative term that followed, he served as Deputy Speaker of the provincial legislature.

== Later career ==
Although Nobunga left the legislature after the 2009 general election, he remained active in the ANC in the province. He had lost his seat on the Provincial Executive Committee in August 2008, at the provincial party conference that had elected David Mabuza as ANC provincial chairperson; at that conference, Nobunga had supported Lassy Chiwayo, who ran against Mabuza. At each of the next two provincial party conferences, Nobunga unsuccessfully opposed Mabuza's re-election, standing as a candidate on anti-Mabuza slates for top party positions – for deputy provincial secretary in 2012, and for provincial treasurer in 2015.

In April 2017, Nobunga began a five-year term as chief executive officer of the Mpumalanga Tourism and Parks Agency.

== Personal life ==
He is married and has children.
