= Stefan Grové =

South African politician (born 1949)

Member of the National Assembly
- In office 27 September 1999 – April 2004
- Constituency: Mpumalanga

Delegate to the National Council of Provinces

Assembly Member for Eastern Transvaal
- In office May 1994 – June 1999

Personal details
- Born: 15 October 1949 (age 76)
- Citizenship: South Africa
- Party: African National Congress

Stefanus Petrus Grové (born 15 October 1949) is a retired South African politician from Mpumalanga. He represented the African National Congress (ANC) in the National Council of Provinces (NCOP) from 1994 to 1999 and in the National Assembly from 1999 to 2004.

== Legislative career ==
In South Africa's first post-apartheid elections in 1994, Grové was elected to represent the ANC in the Senate, the upper house of the new South African Parliament. He was a member of the Eastern Transvaal caucus (present-day Mpumalanga). He remained in his seat after the house was restructured as the NCOP under the 1996 Constitution.

In the next general election in 1999, Grové stood for election to the lower house, the National Assembly, on the ANC ticket. He narrowly missed election. However, shortly into the legislative term, Mathews Phosa resigned from his seat; Grové was sworn in to replace him on 27 September 1999. He left Parliament after the 2004 general election.
