= Douglas Maimane =

South African politician (born 1969)

Member of the National Assembly
- In office June 1999 – April 2004
- Constituency: North West

Personal details
- Born: Douglas Seleke Maimane; 16 June 1969 (age 56)
- Citizenship: South Africa
- Party: African National Congress

Douglas Seleke Maimane (born 16 June 1969) is a South African politician who has been mayor of Madibeng Local Municipality in the North West since November 2021. He previously represented the African National Congress (ANC) in the National Assembly from 1999 to 2004. In 2006, he was appointed Single Whip of Madibeng Local Municipality until 2009. In 2011 he was appointed as Member of Mayoral Committee (MMC) for Local Economic Development amongst other departments where he served until 2021.

== National Assembly: 1999–2004 ==
Maimane was elected to the National Assembly in the 1999 general election, representing the North West constituency. He served a single term in the seat, leaving after the 2004 general election.

== Travelgate: 2005–2006 ==
Less than a year after he left Parliament, Maimane appeared in court on fraud charges in connection with the Travelgate scandal, which saw several MPs accused of abusing parliamentary air-travel vouchers for private gain. In October 2006, he accepted a plea bargain with the Scorpions, in terms of which he pled guilty to theft. He was sentenced to pay a fine of R25,000 or serve three years in prison, with an additional five-year prison sentence suspended for five years.

== Mayor of Madibeng: 2021–present ==
Maimane later represented the ANC as a local councillor in Madibeng, where he was a Member of the Mayoral Committee (MMC) until January 2014, when he was elected as speaker of the council. His promotion was part of a campaign by the ANC to stabilise the municipality following a series of corruption scandals and violent service delivery protests in Brits.

Maimane was re-elected as a councillor in the 2021 local elections and after the election, on 22 November, he was elected as executive mayor of Madibeng. Notwithstanding a scandal in 2022 in which one of Maimane's MMCs accused him of sexual harassment, he remained in the mayoral office as of April 2023.
