= Bernice Sigabi =

South African politician

Member of the National Assembly
- In office June 1999 – 2003
- Constituency: Gauteng

Personal details
- Born: 29 December 1951 (age 74)
- Citizenship: South Africa
- Party: Democratic Alliance; Democratic Party

Bernice Nomareledwane Sigabi (born 29 December 1951), also known as Bernice Sono, is a South African politician who represented the Democratic Party (DP) and Democratic Alliance (DA) in the National Assembly from 1999 to 2003. Elected in 1999, she served the Gauteng constituency and was the DA's spokesperson on the status of women. She resigned from her seat in 2003.
