= Lesiba Kgwele =

South African politician and strategist

Member of the National Assembly
- In office June 1999 – April 2004
- Constituency: North West

Personal details
- Born: 11 September 1962 (age 63)
- Citizenship: South Africa
- Party: African National Congress

Lesiba Moses Kgwele (born 11 September 1962) is a South African politician and communications strategist. He represented the African National Congress (ANC) in the National Assembly for a single term from 1999 to 2004, serving the North West constituency. He left Parliament after the 2014 general election.

He later served as spokesman and head of communications for the Premier of the North West during the tenure of Premier Thandi Modise. Shortly after Modise left the office, in July 2014, Kgwele was sacked for misconduct. The government said that the disciplinary hearing had been initiated in March 2013 and had found Kgwele guilty of gross insubordination. Kgwele said that the misconduct charges were "part of a much bigger orchestrated plot to purge and ultimately destroy me" based on "a personal grudge".
