= Ben Mthembu =

South African politician (born 1950)

Member of the National Assembly
- In office June 1999 – May 2009

Personal details
- Born: 2 May 1950 (age 75)
- Citizenship: South Africa
- Party: African National Congress

Ben Mthembu (born 2 May 1950) is a South African politician who represented the African National Congress (ANC) in the National Assembly from 1999 to 2009. He was elected in 1999 to represent the Mpumalanga constituency and gained re-election in 2004 off the ANC's national party list. During his second term, he was a member of the Portfolio Committee on Education.
