= Curtis Mabena =

South African politician

Member of the National Assembly
- In office 3 July 2001 – May 2009

Personal details
- Born: 8 November 1959 (age 66)
- Citizenship: South Africa
- Party: African National Congress

Daniel Curtis Mabena (born 8 November 1959) is a South African politician and civil servant who represented the African National Congress (ANC) in the National Assembly from 2001 to 2009. He first joined the assembly on 3 July 2001, filling the casual vacancy arising from Thabang Makwetla's resignation, and was elected to a full term in the 2004 general election.

After vacating his seat in the 2009 general election, Mabena worked in public administration in the Department of Water Affairs. In May 2011, News24 reported that the South African Qualifications Authority had found that he had misrepresented his qualifications on his resumé, falsely claiming to have an honours degree in comparative and development studies.
