= Norman Middleton =

South African sports administrator (1921–2015)

Member of the National Assembly
- In office June 1999 – April 2004

Personal details
- Born: Norman Steward Middleton; 22 January 1921 Sophiatown, Transvaal; Union of South Africa
- Died: 2 July 2015 (aged 94)
- Party: Inkatha Freedom Party

Norman Steward Middleton (22 January 1921 – 2 July 2015) was a South African activist, sports administrator, and politician. A former president of the South African Soccer Federation and South African Council of Sport, he represented the Inkatha Freedom Party (IFP) in the National Assembly from 1999 to 2004.

The son of a stonemason from Scotland and a teacher from Greytown, Middleton was born in Sophiatown on 22 January 1921 and moved to Pietermaritzburg when he was ten. He was a World War II veteran and later was active in the trade union movement in Natal Province, first through the Leather Workers Union and then through the Engineering Industrial Union. He died on 2 July 2015, aged 94. In 2021, sports minister Nathi Mthethwa awarded him a posthumous Andrew Mlangeni Green Jacket Award for his contribution to non-racial sport.
