= Bafunani Mnguni =

South African politician (born 1960)

Delegate to the National Council of Provinces

Assembly Member for Free State
- In office 7 May 2009 – 21 April 2014

Member of the National Assembly
- In office 3 July 2001 – May 2009

Personal details
- Born: 22 December 1960 (age 65)
- Citizenship: South Africa
- Party: African National Congress

Bafunani Aaron Mnguni (born 22 December 1960), also spelled Bafumani Mnguni, is a South African politician from the Free State. He represented the African National Congress (ANC) in the National Council of Provinces from 2009 to 2014 and in the National Assembly from 2001 to 2009. Before that, he served in the Free State Provincial Legislature.

== Legislative career ==
Mnguni was elected to the Free State Provincial Legislature in the 1999 general election and served as chairperson of the provincial portfolio committee on finance until late June 2001, when the ANC announced a reshuffle of its legislative caucuses. He resigned from the provincial legislature and was sworn in to the National Assembly on 3 July 2001, filling the seat of Beatrice Marshoff, who replaced him in the provincial legislature.

In the next general election in 2004, Mnguni was elected to a full term in the National Assembly. He served on the Portfolio Committee on Finance during the legislative term that followed. In the 2009 general election, he was elected as one of the Free State's delegates to the National Council of Provinces, where, with Patekile Holomisa, he co-chaired Parliament's Joint Committee on Constitutional Review.
