= 23rd South African Parliament =

Parliament of South Africa, 1999–2004

Seats by party in the National Assembly of South Africa after the 1999 general election. ANC DP IFP NNP UDM other parties

Makeup of the National Council of Provinces after the election of the 23rd Parliament. Colours as above; a lighter shade represents a special delegate's seat.

The 23rd South African Parliament was the second Parliament of South Africa since the introduction of non-racial government in South Africa in 1994. It was elected in the 2 June, 1999 general election, and was opened by newly-elected president Thabo Mbeki's State of the Nation address in a joint sitting on 14 June 1999. It held its final session in early 2004, before the April 2004 elections.

== See also ==
- List of members of the National Assembly of South Africa, 1999–2004
- List of members of the Senate of South Africa, 1999–2004
