= Masilo Mabeta =

South African diplomat and former politician

South African Ambassador to Liberia
- In office 5 April 2011 - ?

South African Ambassador to Comoros
- In office 2004 - 2010

Member of the National Assembly of South Africa
- In office ?-?

Personal details
- Born: 21 June 1947 (age 78)
- Party: United Democratic Movement; African National Congress (former)
- Education: Harvard University

Masilo Esau Mabeta (born 21 June 1947) is a South African diplomat and former politician. He was the South African Ambassador to Liberia. When he presented his credentials on 5 April 2011, he became the first Resident Ambassador from South Africa. He was also the South African ambassador to the Comoros from 2004 to 2010.

During apartheid, Mabeta was a member of the African National Congress. He left South Africa to go into exile in 1980, and in 1985 he graduated from Harvard University with a thesis titled Conflict Resolution in Zimbabwe: The Role of the United States of America. He later joined the United Democratic Movement, which he represented in the National Assembly before he joined the diplomatic service.
