= Helen Matlanyane =

South African politician (born 1956)

Member of the National Assembly
- In office 6 May 2009 – 6 May 2014
- In office 20 September 1999 – April 2004
- Constituency: Limpopo

Delegate to the National Council of Provinces

Assembly Member for Limpopo
- In office April 2004 – May 2009

Personal details
- Born: 3 February 1956 (age 70)
- Citizenship: South Africa
- Party: African National Congress

Helen Flora Matlanyane (born 3 February 1956), formerly known as Helen Malebana, is a South African politician from Limpopo. She served two non-consecutive terms in the National Assembly, from 1999 to 2004 and from 2009 to 2014, and in the interim she served in the National Council of Provinces from 2004 to 2009. She is a member of the African National Congress (ANC).

== Legislative career: 1999–2014 ==
In the 1999 general election, Matlanyane was included on the ANC's party list of candidates for the National Assembly, but she was placed in an unelectable rank. However, shortly after the election, Koko Mokgalong resigned from her seat; Matlanyane was sworn in to replace her on 20 September 1999. Matlanyane left the National Assembly at the 2004 general election, after which she was elected to represent the ANC as whip for the Limpopo caucus of the National Council of Provinces.

Following her term in the National Council of Provinces, Matlanyane returned to the National Assembly in the 2009 general election. She was appointed as the ANC's whip in the Portfolio Committee on Rural Development and Land Reform. She left Parliament after the 2014 general election.
