= Maxwell Sibiya =

South African politician

Member of the National Assembly
- In office 1 August 2000 – April 2004

Personal details
- Born: Maxwell Sandlesihle Moses Sibiya; 25 February 1956 (age 70)
- Citizenship: South Africa
- Party: Inkatha Freedom Party

Maxwell Sandlesihle Moses Sibiya (born 25 February 1956) is a South African politician. He represented the Inkatha Freedom Party (IFP) in the National Assembly from 2000 to 2004 and he is a former provincial chairperson of the IFP's Mpumalanga branch.

== Life and career ==
Sibiya was born on 25 February 1956. By 1999, he was the IFP's provincial chairperson in Mpumalanga, and in that year's general election, he stood as the party's top-ranked candidate for election to the Mpumalanga Provincial Legislature. The IFP did not win any seats in the provincial legislature and Sibiya was not elected. However, on 1 August 2000, he was sworn into the IFP's caucus in the National Assembly, where he filled a casual vacancy.

He left Parliament after the 2004 general election. In 2006, he was summoned for questioning at a liquidation inquiry, where he was asked about possible abuse of parliamentary travel vouchers in the Travelgate scandal. He denied wrongdoing and did not face criminal charges.

In the 2014 general election, Sibiya stood for election both to the Mpumalanga Provincial Legislature and to the Mpumalanga caucus in the National Assembly, but the IFP's poor performance in the province again prevented him from gaining a seat.
