= Basil Douglas (politician) =

South African politician (1960–2020)

Member of the National Assembly
- In office June 1999 – April 2004

Personal details
- Born: 25 February 1960 Noordsig, Johannesburg; Transvaal, Union of South Africa
- Died: 28 August 2020 (aged 60)
- Party: Democratic Alliance; New National Party; Inkatha Freedom Party; Pan Africanist Congress

Basil Mark Douglas (25 February 1960 – 28 August 2020) was a South African politician and community activist in the coloured suburbs of Johannesburg. He served in the National Assembly from 1999 to 2004, representing the Inkatha Freedom Party (IFP) until April 2003, when he crossed the floor to the New National Party (NNP).

A teacher by profession, he founded the South Western Joint Civic Association in 1994 and subsequently led the group through two major ratepayers' protests. After leaving Parliament in 2004, he represented the Democratic Alliance (DA) as a local councillor in the City of Johannesburg Metropolitan Municipality from early 2015 until early 2020, when he was expelled from the DA for insubordination.

== Early life and activism ==
Douglas was born on 25 February 1960 in Noordsig outside Johannesburg in the former Transvaal province. He was classified as coloured under apartheid. He was the second of seven children and was raised by his mother and grandmother after his parents divorced. He dropped out of school at age 14 and joined a gang. However, he later returned to school, obtained a teaching diploma, and went on to teach history, geography, and physical education in schools.

Douglas joined the Progressive Teachers' Union, a predecessor of the South African Democratic Teachers' Union, and then joined the anti-apartheid Pan Africanist Congress (PAC). According to him, he was a member of the PAC until 1993, when he left in order to "focus on community issues". However, the PAC's secretary-general, Benny Alexander, said that Douglas had been expelled from the party when he refused to cooperate with internal disciplinary proceedings after allegedly assaulting another party member. After his expulsion from the PAC, he was briefly associated with Malcolm Lupton's National Liberation Front, a coloured nationalist movement which campaigned for a coloured homeland; Douglas said that he left after "about three weeks" upon discovering that it was a "racist" organisation.

== Johannesburg civics movement ==
Douglas rose to national prominence in 1994 during the post-apartheid transition, at which point Douglas was a geography teacher in Eldorado Park. In early September 1994, he launched the South Western Joint Civic Association (Sowejoca), an association of local civic organisations in the south-western (primarily coloured) suburbs of Johannesburg. Unlike affiliates of the South African National Civics Organisation, Sowejoca's members were broadly opposed to the African National Congress (ANC) and the ANC-allied civic groups which had been given representation on the Transvaal Metropolitan Council. Sowejoca led violent ratepayers' protests in Johannesburg in September 1994 and a mass stay-away, also violent and also protesting rising rates, in February 1997. Douglas claimed that coloured people were being discriminated against by a racist, black-dominated ANC government.

By February 1997, Sowejoca was accommodated in the Johannesburg offices of the Inkatha Freedom Party (IFP), but Douglas said that he was non-partisan:

I don’t belong to any political party. We are in IFP premises because they are very kind people. They are our friends and have done many good things for coloured people. One day, if my head turns, I will study their political paper.

== Parliament: 1999-2004 ==
In the 1999 general election, Douglas was elected to an IFP seat in the National Assembly, the lower house of the South African Parliament; he represented the Gauteng constituency. In 2001, he caused controversy in the party when he allegedly encouraged Indian and coloured party members to boycott an internal election which saw a white member, Barry Dunn, elected as IFP chairperson in Gauteng. During the 2003 floor-crossing window, Douglas left the IFP and joined the New National Party (NNP), saying that he viewed the NNP as a vehicle for uniting coloured and white South Africans. He served under the NNP banner until the 2004 general election.

== Local government ==
Douglas subsequently joined the Democratic Alliance (DA). In the 2014 general election, he stood for election to the National Assembly on the DA's ticket, but he was ranked 178th on the party's national list and did not secure a seat. In a January 2015 by-election, he was elected to represent the DA as a local councillor in ward 68 in Johannesburg, beating the ANC candidate with 3,703 votes against his opponent's 3315.

However, in December 2019, Douglas and another DA councillor, Vinay Choonie, defied instructions from the DA and voted with the ANC to elect Geoff Makhubo as Mayor of Johannesburg. After that, both attended another council sitting which elected the ANC's Nonceba Molwele as Speaker of the council, again in defiance of DA instructions. When the DA said that they would face internal disciplinary charges, Douglas said publicly that the DA was a "white racist party". He was subsequently expelled from the party and therefore lost his seat in the council. According to the ANC itself, he joined the ANC after being expelled from the DA and died on 28 August 2020.

== Personal life ==
Douglas described himself as a born-again Christian. He was married and as of 1997 had two children.
