= Dickson Mkono =

South African politician

Delegate to the National Council of Provinces

Assembly Member for Eastern Cape
- In office April 2004 – May 2009

Member of the National Assembly
- In office 26 March 2001 – April 2004
- Constituency: Eastern Cape

Personal details
- Born: Dickson Gcinikhaya Mkono; 4 November 1960 (age 65)
- Citizenship: South Africa
- Party: African National Congress (since March 2003)
- Other political affiliations: United Democratic Movement (until March 2003)

Dickson Gcinikhaya Mkono (born 4 November 1960) is a South African politician from the Eastern Cape. He served in the National Assembly from 2001 to 2004 and in the National Council of Provinces from 2004 to 2009. He was a member of the United Democratic Movement (UDM) until March 2003, when he crossed the floor to the African National Congress (ANC).

== Legislative career ==
=== National Assembly: 2001–2004 ===
Mkono joined the National Assembly on 26 March 2001, when he was nominated by the UDM to fill in for the casual vacancy arising from Ndaba Mtirara's resignation. He was a member of the Eastern Cape caucus.

Two years after he was installed in his seat, during the floor-crossing window of March 2003, Mkono announced that he had resigned from the UDM to join the governing ANC. In a press statement, Mkono said that the UDM was "neither united nor democratic", claimed that the party was "losing membership like a tree shedding its leaves", and was highly critical of party leader Bantu Holomisa.

=== National Council of Provinces: 2004–2009 ===
In the next general election in 2004, Mkono was elected to represent the ANC in the National Council of Provinces, where he was a permanent delegate for the Eastern Cape.
