= Wilson Mudau =

South African politician (born 1961)

Member of the National Assembly
- In office 3 July 2001 – April 2004
- Constituency: Mpumalanga

Member of the Mpumalanga Provincial Legislature
- In office June 1999 – July 2001

Personal details
- Born: Nyambeni Wilson Mudau; 4 January 1961 (age 65)
- Citizenship: South Africa
- Party: African National Congress

Nyambeni Wilson Mudau (born 4 January 1961) is a South African politician from Mpumalanga. He represented the African National Congress (ANC) in the National Assembly from 2001 to 2004. Before that, he served in the Mpumalanga Provincial Legislature and National Council of Provinces.

== Political career ==
Born on 4 January 1961, Mudau began his career in the National Council of Provinces. Though not initially elected to his seat in the 1994 general election, he joined the chamber during the legislative term. In the next general election in 1999, he was elected to an ANC seat in the Mpumalanga Provincial Legislature, where he served as ANC caucus chairperson.

He left the legislature in early July 2001 as part of a reshuffle of the Mpumalanga ANC's legislative caucuses, viewed by media as part of a "purge" by Mpumalanga Premier Ndaweni Mahlangu. Mudau and other critics of Mahlangu were transferred to the National Assembly, where he was sworn in on 3 July to replace Mabhuza Gininda.

Mudau left Parliament after the 2004 general election. He later served as chairperson of the provincial operating licensing board in Mpumalanga; he was appointed to a three-year term in that position in October 2005.
