= Zunaid Kotwal =

South African politician (born 1960)

Member of the National Assembly
- In office June 1999 – May 2009
- Constituency: Mpumalanga

Personal details
- Born: 1 November 1960 (age 65)
- Citizenship: South Africa
- Party: African National Congress

Zunaid Kotwal (born 1 November 1960) is a South African politician who represented the African National Congress (ANC) in the National Assembly from 1999 to 2009, gaining election in 1999 and 2004. He represented the Mpumalanga constituency.

== Personal life ==
He is married to Ruwaida Kotwal. In November 2003, the couple's youngest son, aged two, drowned in the communal pool of the parliamentary village at Pelican Park in Cape Town.
