= Fezile Bhengu =

South African politician (born 1954)

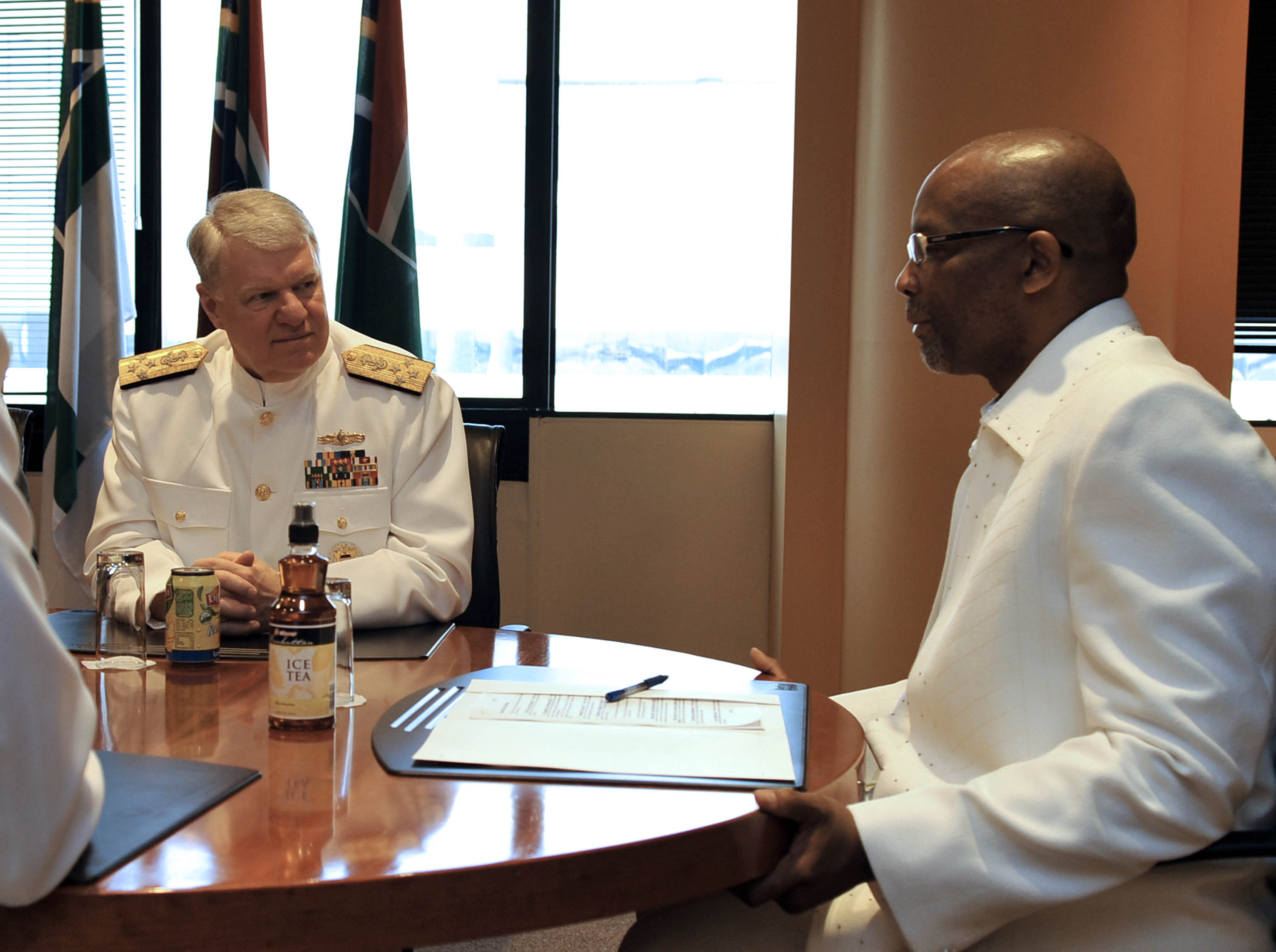
- Gary Roughead (left) and Bhengu (right), in 2009

Deputy Minister of Defence of South Africa
- Succeeded by: Thabang Makwetla

Personal details
- Born: 6 August 1954 (age 72)

Fezile Bhengu (born 6 August 1954) is the former Deputy Minister of Defence of South Africa until 11 May 2009, being succeeded by Thabang Makwetla.
