= Serake Leeuw =

South African politician (born 1960)

Mayor of Matjhabeng
- In office 2000–2006

Member of the National Assembly
- In office 9 May 1994 – 6 December 2000

Personal details
- Born: Serake Jacob Leeuw; 6 December 1960 (age 65)
- Citizenship: South Africa
- Party: African National Congress

Serake Jacob Leeuw (born 6 December 1960) is a South African politician and former trade unionist. He represented the African National Congress (ANC) in the National Assembly from 1994 to 2000, gaining election in 1994 and 1999. He was a member of the Standing Committee on Public Accounts, where Andrew Feinstein said he was one of Parliament's "leading lights".

Leeuw left the National Assembly after the 2000 local elections, on 6 December 2000, in order to become Mayor of Matjhabeng Local Municipality in the Free State. During his term as mayor, the municipality faced violent service delivery protests in 2005.

During apartheid, Leeuw was a founding member of the Post and Telecommunication Workers' Association (POTWA) and served as POTWA regional treasurer from 1986 to 1992. He is also a former regional chairperson of the Congress of South African Trade Unions in the Northern Cape and Free State region.
