= Mlungisi Hlongwane =

South African politician

Member of the National Assembly
- In office June 1999 – 1 July 1999

Personal details
- Citizenship: South Africa
- Party: African National Congress; Congress of the People (2008–2009 only)
- Other political affiliations: South African National Civics Organisation

Jonathan Mlungisi Hlongwane is a South African politician who served as president of the South African National Civics Organisation (SANCO) from 1995 to 2008. He also represented the African National Congress (ANC) in the National Assembly in 1999 and as Executive Mayor of Gauteng's Sedibeng District Municipality from 2005 to 2008.

He left the mayoral office and SANCO in November 2008, when he defected from the ANC, a close partner of SANCO, to join the newly formed Congress of the People (COPE). He served as COPE's provincial chairperson in Gauteng and its head of elections in the 2009 general election. However, following about four months at COPE, and before the election had taken place, Hlongwane said that he regretted his choices and rejoined the ANC.

== SANCO: 1995–2008 ==
Hlongwane was national president of SANCO from 1995 to 2008, gaining re-election on several occasions – his third term was won in 2001 after a bitter contest against Moses Mayekiso. During his tenure, SANCO was frequently the target of accusations of financial mismanagement and misappropriation of funds. In 2002, trading of such allegations among SANCO's own top leadership led to the resignation of Dan Mofokeng, Hlongwane's secretary-general, after a bitter and public argument with Hlongwane. The Mail & Guardian said that Hlongwane "presided over the decimation of SANCO and helped turn it into an anaemic shadow of its former self".

=== Presidential term limits: 2006 ===
Hlongwane was viewed as a strong ally of President Thabo Mbeki, who took office in 1999. In January 2006, SANCO controversially announced that it intended to propose that the Tripartite Alliance should campaign for a constitutional amendment that would allow Mbeki to stand as head of state for a third term. Hlongwane said that though the proposal might be "politically taboo", it had obvious merits:

The maximum two terms that a president can serve is denying the country the opportunity to sustain developmental programmes that had been started... We cannot be compared to developed economies who took time to reach their level of development to be comfortable with the two terms. We need to retain and keep the best minds in government for sustainability. We have taken it to the extreme by putting two terms when a young president can be forced to retire just merely 10 years in office. Our economies cannot be compared with developed economies who can afford a two-term period for a president.

The SABC subsequently reported that, contrary to Hlongwane's presentation of the matter, the proposal in question did not have the support of SANCO's national executive, but had been pushed through by a certain group of leaders. Hlongwane denied this.

=== Suspension: 2006 ===
In mid-June 2006, there was some confusion about whether or not Hlongwane had been suspended from the SANCO presidency. Some SANCO leaders said that he had been suspended pending a disciplinary inquiry into his conduct – in connection with his allegedly making public statements, including the term limits proposal, without collective authorisation – while others, including Hlongwane, said that any decision to suspend him had not been taken according to the proper procedure.

It transpired that the decision to suspend Hlongwane had indeed been made by an inquorate meeting, but, days later, the decision was taken afresh and Hlongwane was suspended. His deputy, Ruth Bhengu, explicated a long list of grievances against Hlongwane, including wide-ranging leadership failures and a basic failure to convene meetings; the Mail & Guardian said her presentation was convincing enough "to counter perceptions that [Hlongwane] was suspended because of this support for a third Thabo Mbeki presidency". In future months, SANCO remained severely divided between Hlongwane's supporters and his detractors.

== Government offices ==
While serving as SANCO president, Hlongwane represented the ANC, SANCO's alliance partner, in government. He was elected to an ANC seat in the National Assembly in the June 1999 general election, but resigned from his seat on 1 July the same year. In April 2005, the ANC announced that it would send Hlongwane to join the council at Sedibeng District Municipality in Gauteng, where he was elected as mayor. He stood as the ANC's mayoral candidate in the 2006 local elections the next year and was elected to a full term in the mayoral office.

== Defection to COPE: 2008 ==
When Sam Shilowa and Mosiuoa Lekota announced that they intended to defect from the ANC and establish a new party, Hlongwane immediately said that he intended to follow them. He complained of "factionalism", "moral decay", and institutionalised "violence and intimidation" in the ANC, saying that he had "never ever experienced a leadership of the ANC so insecure and paranoid of their gravitas and legitimacy". Hlongwane promised to use SANCO's resources and membership base to strengthen the new party.

Upon joining COPE, Hlongwane resigned from ANC membership and from the Sedibeng mayoral office; because he was no longer an ANC member, SANCO also expelled him from the presidency. At SANCO, his deputy, Bhengu, replaced him the following month. Also in December 2008, COPE announced that it had appointed Hlongwane as head of elections ahead of the 2009 general election. He was also considered to be a frontrunner for selection as COPE's candidate for Premier of Gauteng. Although he did not win the premiership nomination, he went on to serve as chairperson of COPE's branch in Gauteng, in parallel to his duties as elections coordinator.

== Return to the ANC: 2009 ==
Only months later, in March 2009, Hlongwane announced his return to the ANC in memorable circumstances. He scheduled a press conference in Johannesburg with Transport Minister Jeff Radebe, who had secured the facilitation of Talk Radio 702 by promising an announcement of "national importance". However, at the last minute, the radio station cancelled the briefing at its offices, saying that it had discovered that the announcement was "not of national import". An impromptu press conference was held under a tree in the parking lot, and Hlongwane announced that he regretted his move to COPE and had applied to renew his ANC membership. Among other things, he said that COPE was dominated by "a select group of Xhosa-speaking leaders [who] have embarked on a secretary strategy to place only Xhosa-speaking leaders at strategic political centres".

In the aftermath, COPE claimed that Hlongwane had resigned from the party only after learning that he had been notified that COPE intended to conduct an inquiry into his work on the election campaign, which at that time was not yet complete. According to COPE, COPE deputy president Shilowa had taken over the management of the campaign about a month ago following revelations of Hlongwane's incompetence. Indeed, COPE had identified Hlongwane as "a possible ANC mole" committing "acts of sabotage which were meant to embarrass the party".

When the election was held in April 2009, Hlongwane was elected to one of six COPE seats in the Gauteng Provincial Legislature as a result of his position on COPE's party list, drawn up before his resignation. He was not sworn in to the seat. As of late 2018, he remained active in regional ANC politics in Sedibeng.

== Personal life ==
Hlongwane is married to Greta Hlongwane, who is a local ANC politician in Gauteng. She remained a member of the party when Hlongwane defected to COPE in 2008.
