= Bheki Mkhize =

South African politician and trade unionist (1952–2000)

Member of the National Assembly
- In office 1995 – 30 July 2000

Personal details
- Born: 18 August 1952
- Died: 30 July 2000 (aged 47) Mahlabatini, KwaZulu-Natal; Union of South Africa
- Citizenship: South Africa
- Party: African National Congress

Bhekokwakhe Robert Mkhize (18 August 1952 – 30 July 2000) was a South African politician and trade unionist who was the founding president of the National Education, Health and Allied Workers' Union from 1987 to 1992. He represented the African National Congress (ANC) in the National Assembly from 1995 until his death in 2000.

Mkhize was shot dead in July 2000 during a police raid on his home at Mhlabatini, KwaZulu-Natal. The police officer who shot him claimed that he had acted in self-defence after a scuffle broke out while the South African Police Service attempted to search Mkhize's property for unlicensed weapons. The officer was later convicted of having murdered Mkhize, and the ANC and Congress of South African Trade Unions claimed that the murder was a planned political assassination.

== Political career ==
Mkhize was born on 18 August 1952. During the 1980s, he was active in the General Workers' Union, an affiliate of the ANC-aligned Congress of South African Trade Unions (COSATU). He was later a founding member and inaugural president of another COSATU affiliate, the National Education, Health and Allied Workers' Union (NEHAWU), from 1987 to 1992.

He joined the National Assembly in 1995, filling a casual vacancy in the ANC's caucus, and was re-elected to a full term in the seat in the 1999 general election. He ran one of the ANC's constituency offices in Northcliff in Randburg outside Johannesburg.

== Death ==
In the early morning of 30 July 2000, Mkhize was shot dead during a police raid at his second home at Mhlabatini near Ulundi in northern KwaZulu-Natal, where he had been visiting family. Members of the South African Police Service (SAPS) police had been searching homes in the area for illegal weapons. The police inspector who fired the fatal shot said that Mkhize had tried to grab his firearm, an R5 rifle, during a scuffle, and that he had therefore been acting in self-defence. SAPS conceded that the officers – 13 public-order policing officers – had not had a warrant to search Mkhize's home, but said that they had not needed one because they had received an urgent tip-off that Mkhize had unlicensed weapons in his home.

Subsequent investigation by the Independent Complaints Directorate found that Mkhize had been dragged out of the house by two policemen and kicked to the ground. He had been kneeling, unarmed, when he was shot; the bullet had entered his right hand, with which he had been covering his face, and lodged at the base of his skull, killing him instantly. No unlicensed weapons were found at his home, only one licensed revolver. One police inspector was arrested on the day of the killing and three further arrest warrants were issued within two weeks. The officers were subsequently charged with Mkhize's murder.

Mkhize's death immediately attracted attention because many police in KwaZulu-Natal were members of the opposition Inkatha Freedom Party (IFP), which was the ruling party in the former KwaZulu homeland. For much of the preceding decade, the region had been affected by low-intensity civil conflict between IFP and ANC members. Leaders of the ANC and Tripartite Alliance immediately suggested that the killing should be viewed as a possible political assassination, and Mkhize's funeral in Mhlabathini took place in a politically charged atmosphere. Addressing mourners, COSATU general secretary Zwelinzima Vavi said, "This heinous crime by the police should be condemned in strongest terms. In our eyes, comrade Bheki Mkhize was murdered in cold-blood by trigger-happy policemen". The Provincial Executive Committee of the ANC's KwaZulu-Natal branch demanded the arrest of all the police officers who had been present during Mkhize's "gruesome assassination". One officer was convicted of Mkhize's murder in August 2001.

== Personal life ==
In line with Zulu custom, Mkhize was polygamous: he had two wives, Ellen Mchunu and Debbie McConnell, and nine children. He lived in Johannesburg but had a second home at Mhlabatini.

== See also ==
- List of members of the National Assembly of South Africa who died in office
