= Mthunzi Vilakazi =

South African politician (1955–2000)

Member of the National Assembly
- In office 9 May 1994 – 16 February 2000
- Constituency: Mpumalanga

Personal details
- Born: 23 September 1955
- Died: 16 February 2000 (aged 44)
- Citizenship: South Africa
- Party: African National Congress

Mthunzi Isaac Vilakazi (23 September 1955 – 16 February 2000) was a South African politician from Mpumalanga. He represented the African National Congress (ANC) in the National Assembly from 1994 until his death in 2000.

== Legislative career ==
Vilakazi was born on 23 September 1955. He was elected to the National Assembly in South Africa's first post-apartheid elections in 1994 and gained re-election in 1999, representing the Mpumalanga constituency.

== Personal life and death ==
He was married to Gloria Vilakazi and lived in Witbank, Mpumalanga. He died on 16 February 2000. Though the ANC refused to comment on the cause of his death, and his wife said that he had died from complications arising from kidney and liver failure, his death coincided with the peak of the HIV/AIDS epidemic in South Africa and was rumoured to be AIDS-related. The rumours triggered debate in Parliament about MPs' role in destigmatising HIV.

== See also ==
- List of members of the National Assembly of South Africa who died in office
