= Manie Schoeman =

South African politician

Member of the National Assembly
- In office April 2001 – May 2009
- In office May 1994 – September 2000

Personal details
- Born: 3 August 1942 (age 83)
- Citizenship: South Africa
- Party: African National Congress (since 2000); New National Party (1997–2000); National Party (until 1997)
- Education: Grey College, Bloemfontein

Emanuel Andreas "Manie" Schoeman (born 3 August 1942) is a South African politician who served in the National Assembly from 1994 to 2009, excepting a brief hiatus from 2000 to 2001. He represented the National Party (NP) and New National Party (NNP) until September 2000 and the African National Congress (ANC) thereafter.

Schoeman was the NNP's provincial leader in the Eastern Cape until September 2000, when he was expelled from the party for ill discipline after he publicly criticised the NNP's participation in the Democratic Alliance. He therefore lost his seat in Parliament until April 2001, when he was sworn in to a seat under the banner of his new party, the ANC.

== Early life and education ==
Schoeman was born on 3 August 1942 and attended Grey College in Bloemfontein.

== Legislative career ==
=== National Party: 1994–2001 ===
In South Africa's first post-apartheid elections in 1994, Schoeman was elected to represent the NP (later restyled as the NNP) in the new National Assembly. He was re-elected in the 1999 general election, representing the NP in the Eastern Cape constituency. He was also head of the NNP's Eastern Cape branch.

==== Brawl with Johnny de Lange ====
On 17 September 1998, Schoeman and the ANC's Johnny de Lange got into a fistfight in the parliamentary chambers. The fight came at the end of a highly tense parliamentary debate, after which the NP's Andre Fourie and the ANC's Derek Hanekom had a heated argument. Video footage showed that, amid the chaos, Schoeman threw a punch at de Lange, hitting him in the jaw; de Lange, who later said that he had reacted instinctively, retaliated, flooring Schoeman. Schoeman said that he considered de Lange's actions tantamount to assault; both he and de Lange threatened to lay criminal charges against each other. Schoeman, because he landed the first punch, was suspended from Parliament for five days, while de Lange was suspended for one day.

==== Suspension and expulsion ====
In 2000, Schoeman became a prominent critic of his party's participation in the Democratic Alliance (DA), an opposition coalition with the Democratic Party (DP) and Federal Alliance. In March 2000, he told a crowd that the NNP was ideologically closer to the governing ANC than it was to the DP. In July of that year, his party membership was suspended entirely, pending the resolution of internal disciplinary charges arising from his public criticism of the DA.

While he was awaiting the disciplinary hearing, Schoeman continued to criticise the DA, saying in August that it was dominated by white leaders like Tony Leon; he concluded, "if the DA looks and stays as pale as now, I wouldn't be true to myself if I stayed". In September 2000, he was found guilty of ill discipline and expelled from the NNP with immediate effect; he therefore lost his seat in the National Assembly.

=== African National Congress: 2001–2009 ===
The day after he was expelled from the NNP, Schoeman announced that he would join the ANC. In early April 2001, he was sworn back into the National Assembly but in an ANC seat, filling a casual vacancy in the party's caucus. He was re-elected to a final five-year term in the 2004 general election, still representing the ANC.
