= John Ncinane =

South African politician and sports administrator (1949–2018)

Member of the National Assembly
- In office April 2004 – May 1994
- Constituency: Eastern Cape

Personal details
- Born: Increase Zandisile Ncinane; 5 April 1949 Keiskammahoek, Cape Province; Union of South Africa
- Died: January 2018 (aged 68) Keiskammahoek, South Africa
- Party: African National Congress

Increase Zandisile "John" Ncinane (5 April 1949 – January 2018) was a South African politician and sports administrator from the Eastern Cape. He represented the African National Congress (ANC) in the National Assembly from 1994 to 2004.

Ncinane was co-president of Athletics South Africa from 1992 to 1995 and was also an executive member of the South African Rugby Football Union. He was reprimanded for abusing parliamentary travel vouchers in 2000 and was convicted of a similar offence in the Travelgate scandal in 2005.

== Early life and career ==
Ncinane was born on 5 April 1949 and was from Keiskammahoek in the former Cape Province. According to IOL, during apartheid he was a dipping tank supervisor in the government of the Ciskei bantustan and was active in the Ciskei Agricultural Union.

He was later a prominent sports administrator. In 1992, he became the inaugural co-president, with Deon van Zyl, of Athletics South Africa, and he represented the South African Amateur Athletics Congress at the multi-party negotiations to end apartheid.

== Parliament: 1994–2004 ==
In the 1994 general election, South Africa's first under universal suffrage, Ncinane was elected to represent the African National Congress (ANC) in the National Assembly, the lower house of the new South African Parliament. He served two terms in his seat, gaining re-election in 1999, and represented the Eastern Cape constituency. During the ANC's campaign in the 1999 election, he issued a public apology after saying that the ANC would remain in power "even if Jesus Christ were still on earth".

He also remained active in sports administration: he remained co-president of the ASA until 1995, when he ran unsuccessfully for re-election. From then, he deputised the successful candidate, Leonard Chuene, until the next internal elections in 1997, when he lost his re-election bid and instead became an ordinary board member. He also served as president of Border Athletics and was an executive member of the South African Rugby Football Union from 1995 to 2001.

=== Travel voucher fraud: 2000 ===
In 2000, Ncinane was investigated by a parliamentary disciplinary committee, headed by Deputy Speaker Baleka Mbete, following media reports that he had abused the travel vouchers provided to MPs for work-related air travel. The committee found that, between May and August 2000, Ncinane had on several occasions claimed full compensation from Parliament while in fact travelling on discounted vouchers intended for the use of his minor children. In October, he was formally reprimanded by the Speaker of the National Assembly, Frene Ginwala, who described his conduct as "inexcusable and reckless" and said that there was prima facie evidence of fraud. Ncinane apologised for the "deplorable act that I have committed".

In 2001, Ncinane was also subject to an internal party disciplinary process, in which he pled guilty to having contravened the ANC's disciplinary code. In June, the Eastern Cape branch of the ANC sentenced him to a five-year suspension of his ANC membership, though the sentence was itself conditionally suspended for ten years.

=== Border Rugby: 2001 ===
At the same time, early in 2001, Ncinane had successfully contested the presidency of the Border Rugby Football Union, beating senior ANC MP Mluleki George. Months after his election, he was suspended from the position pending the outcome of a criminal case against him; he was accused of, and denied, having misappropriated about R33,000 in rugby development funds to settle a repair bill for his private vehicle. In October, he resigned as president of the union, but said that his decision "had nothing to do with the fraud charges". The criminal charges were withdrawn in January 2002.

In September 2003, the press photographed Ncinane napping in a parliamentary session attended by Deputy President Jacob Zuma, fuelling a debate among MPs about whether Parliament should regulate press coverage of parliamentary proceedings. He left Parliament after the 2004 general election; he remained active in sports administration and ran a funeral parlour.

== Travelgate conviction: 2005 ==
In 2004, the Travelgate scandal broke, leading to a major investigation of widespread abuse of parliamentary travel vouchers; Ncinane was among those who faced criminal charges. In April 2005, Ncinane pled guilty to fraud in terms of a plea bargain, admitting to having exchanged travel vouchers for R80,000 in cash from a Parliament-contracted travel agency between January 2002 and June 2003. He was sentenced to pay a fine of R80,000 or serve three years' imprisonment, in addition to a mandatory five-year suspended prison sentence. In February 2007, a warrant for his arrest was issued after he defaulted on the payment of his fine.

== Personal life and death ==
After he left Parliament, Ncinane lost both of his legs to amputation due to diabetes complications and used a wheelchair. He died in early January 2018 at his home in Keiskammahoek after a long diabetes-related illness. He was married and had children.
