= Lewis Nzimande =

South African politician

Delegate to the National Council of Provinces
- In office 7 May 2009 – 7 May 2019
- Constituency: KwaZulu-Natal

Member of the National Assembly
- In office June 1999 – 6 May 2009

Personal details
- Citizenship: South Africa
- Party: African National Congress

Lewis Paul Musawenkosi Nzimande is a South African politician who represented the African National Congress (ANC) in the National Council of Provinces from 2009 to 2019. Before that he served in the National Assembly from 1999 to 2009.

During his second term in the National Council of Provinces, from 2015 to 2019, Nzimande co-chaired Parliament's Joint Committee on Constitutional Review, which considered – and ultimately recommended in favour of – amending Section 25 of the Constitution to provide for land expropriation without compensation. His co-chair was Vincent Smith of the National Assembly.
