= Nonceba Cindi =

South African politician (born 1951)

Member of the National Assembly
- In office June 1999 – April 2004
- Constituency: North West

Personal details
- Born: 20 October 1951 (age 74)
- Citizenship: South Africa
- Party: African National Congress

Nonceba Veronica Cindi (born 20 October 1951) is a South African politician who represented the African National Congress (ANC) in the National Assembly from 1999 to 2004. She gained election in 1999, ranked first on the ANC's party list for the North West province. She served as a member of Parliament's Joint Monitoring Committee on Children and the Disabled.
