= Manna Naidoo =

South African politician (1948–2022)

Member of the National Assembly
- In office 1 February 2000 – 2 November 2000

Personal details
- Born: Sagadava Naidoo; 4 December 1948
- Died: 25 May 2022 (aged 73) KwaZulu-Natal, South Africa
- Citizenship: South Africa
- Party: United Democratic Movement

Sagadava "Manna" Naidoo (4 December 1948 – 25 May 2022) was a South African politician. He represented the United Democratic Movement (UDM) in the National Assembly from February to November 2000 and was also a former mayor of Verulam, KwaZulu-Natal.

== Political career ==
Born on 4 December 1948, Naidoo entered politics around 1998. He stood for the UDM as a candidate in the general election the following year, but he was not immediately elected. Instead, he joined the National Assembly on 1 February 2000, filling the casual vacancy in the UDM caucus that arose after Roelf Meyer resigned. He served less than a year in the seat, resigning on 2 November 2000. He later served as mayor of Verulam.

== Personal life and death ==
Naidoo and his brother, businessman Sivaraj Naidoo, inherited several properties and businesses in KwaZulu-Natal. Naidoo unsuccessfully sued his brother in 2014, seeking a share in his brother's transport business and in one of the inherited properties, a piece of farmland worth about R450 million.

Naidoo went missing from his farm in KwaZulu-Natal on 25 May 2022. His body was discovered on a sugar cane plantation in Canelands, north of Durban, the following day. He had been tied up and shot several times in a suspected farm invasion; his Toyota Hilux and several firearms had been stolen from his home. Three suspects were arrested in September and charged with murder, kidnapping, and robbery. Naidoo's children subsequently entered into a legal battle with each other over the inheritance of one of Naidoo's properties in Verulam.
