= Buyisiwe Nzimande =

South African politician (born 1952)

Deputy Minister of Public Works
- In office June 1999 – January 2001
- Minister: Stella Sigcau
- Succeeded by: Musa Zondi

Member of the National Assembly
- In office 9 May 1994 – 31 March 2001
- Constituency: KwaZulu-Natal

Ambassador

Personal details
- Born: 31 October 1952 (age 73) Vryheid, Natal Province; Union of South Africa
- Party: Inkatha Freedom Party
- Occupation: South Africa’s Ambassador Extraordinary and Plenipotentiary to the Kingdom of Thailand. Concurrently accredited Ambassador to the Socialist Republic of Vietnam, Kingdom of Cambodia, Union of Myanmar [Burma] and Lao People’s Democratic Republic

Buyisiwe Maureen Nzimande (m. Pheto) (born 31 October 1952) is a South African politician and diplomat who was the Deputy Minister of Public Works from 1999 to 2001 under President Thabo Mbeki. She represented the Inkatha Freedom Party (IFP) in the National Assembly from May 1994 until March 2001, when she resigned to join the diplomatic service.

== Early life and career ==
Nzimande was born on 31 October 1952 in Vryheid in the former Natal province. She completed a teaching diploma at the University of Zululand in 1978 and later, in 1989, a Bachelor of Arts at the same university. She was a teacher and school principal by profession and served as executive secretary of the Natal African Teachers' Union from 1987 to 1992.

She was also a member of Inkatha (later the IFP) and in her youth had been active in the Inkatha Youth Brigade in Umlazi. Inkatha leader Mangosuthu Buthelezi later said that Nzimande was "like a daughter to me"; they were cousins, with their paternal grandmothers both members of the Mtshali family.

She began her life of service as a High School Teacher – Umbelebele High School, Umlazi, Durban in 1979 till 1985. She used this as an opportunity to shape future leaders and upright citizens through exemplary work ethic, dedication and full responsibility.

She then became Principal of Tholukhanya High School in Mahlabatini. She built new school built from scratch gradually introducing pupils from grade 8 to grade 12, as classrooms were built through own initiative and leadership .The school enjoyed a consistent 80% success pass rate. She served in that capacity for seven years 1986 to 1993.

In 1993 she was promoted to Inspector of schools at Ndwedwe Circuit, Verulam, Durban. She covered the whole of Ndwedwe, Durban North areas, Mpumalanga and parts of Pietermaritzburg. A position she held for one and half years before becoming Member of Parliament. In her roles she had far reaching influence - supporting proper teaching methods, assessments and empowerment of educators.

== Career in government ==
In South Africa's first post-apartheid elections in 1994, Nzimande was elected to represent the IFP in the National Assembly as Member of Parliament, the lower house of the new South African Parliament. During her first term, she served as the whip of the IFP's caucus from 1995 to 1997. She was re-elected in 1999, representing the KwaZulu-Natal constituency.

After the 1999 election, newly elected President Thabo Mbeki appointed her as Deputy Minister of Public Works, in which capacity she deputised Minister Stella Sigcau. She served in that office until January 2001, when Mbeki announced that Musa Zondi would replace her in a reshuffle; it was reported that she would become ambassador-designate to Thailand. She resigned from her parliamentary seat on 31 March 2001 and was indeed appointed as an ambassador.

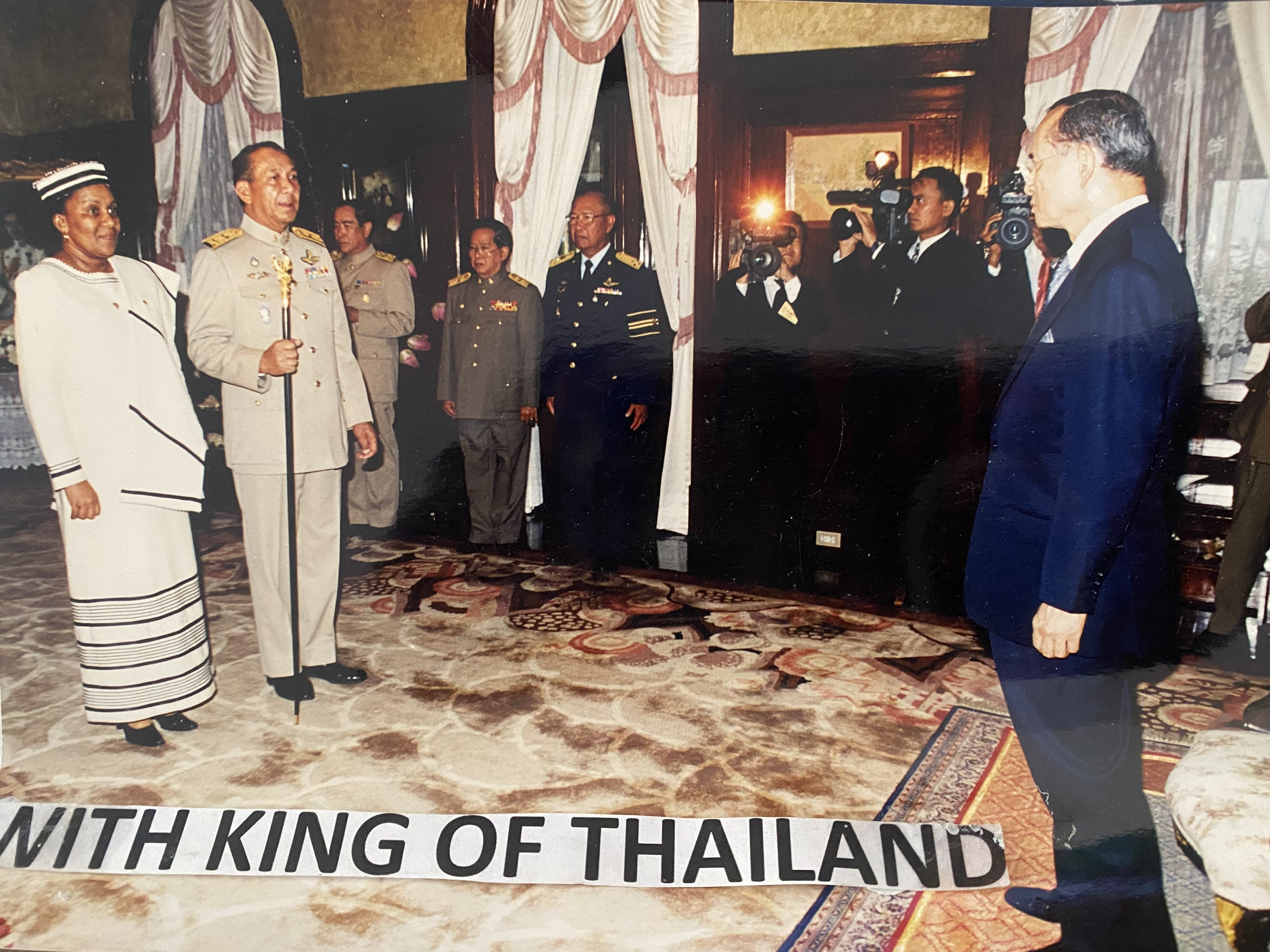

She then became South Africa’s Ambassador Extraordinary and Plenipotentiary to the Kingdom of Thailand. Concurrently accredited Ambassador to the Socialist Republic of Vietnam, Kingdom of Cambodia, Union of Myanmar [Burma] and Lao People’s Democratic Republic. In 2002: Initiated and organized the President of South Africa’s first State visit to the Kingdom of Cambodia which included an address on African Union [AU] and the New Partnership for Africa’s Development [NEPAD] to the Asean Heads of State and Government Summit in the Kingdom of Cambodia – the first ever by a non- Asean Head of State. In 2004: Authored a booklet entitled: Seminar on the New Partnership for Africa’s Development [NEPAD] Bangkok, 27 February 2004, after hosting a successful seminar, one of many such engagements, successfully achieving desired objectives. She was ambassador in these regions from 2002 - 2006.

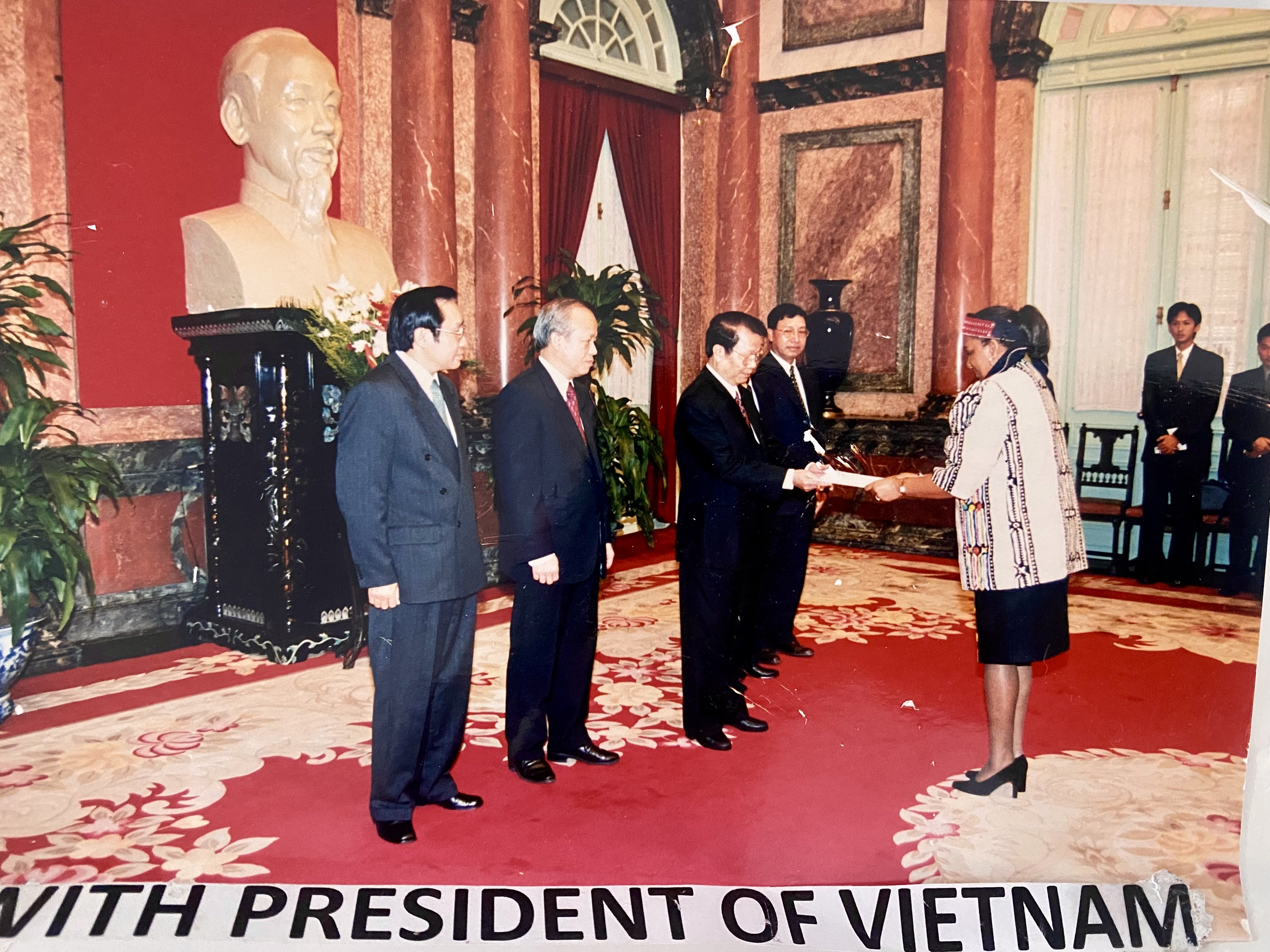
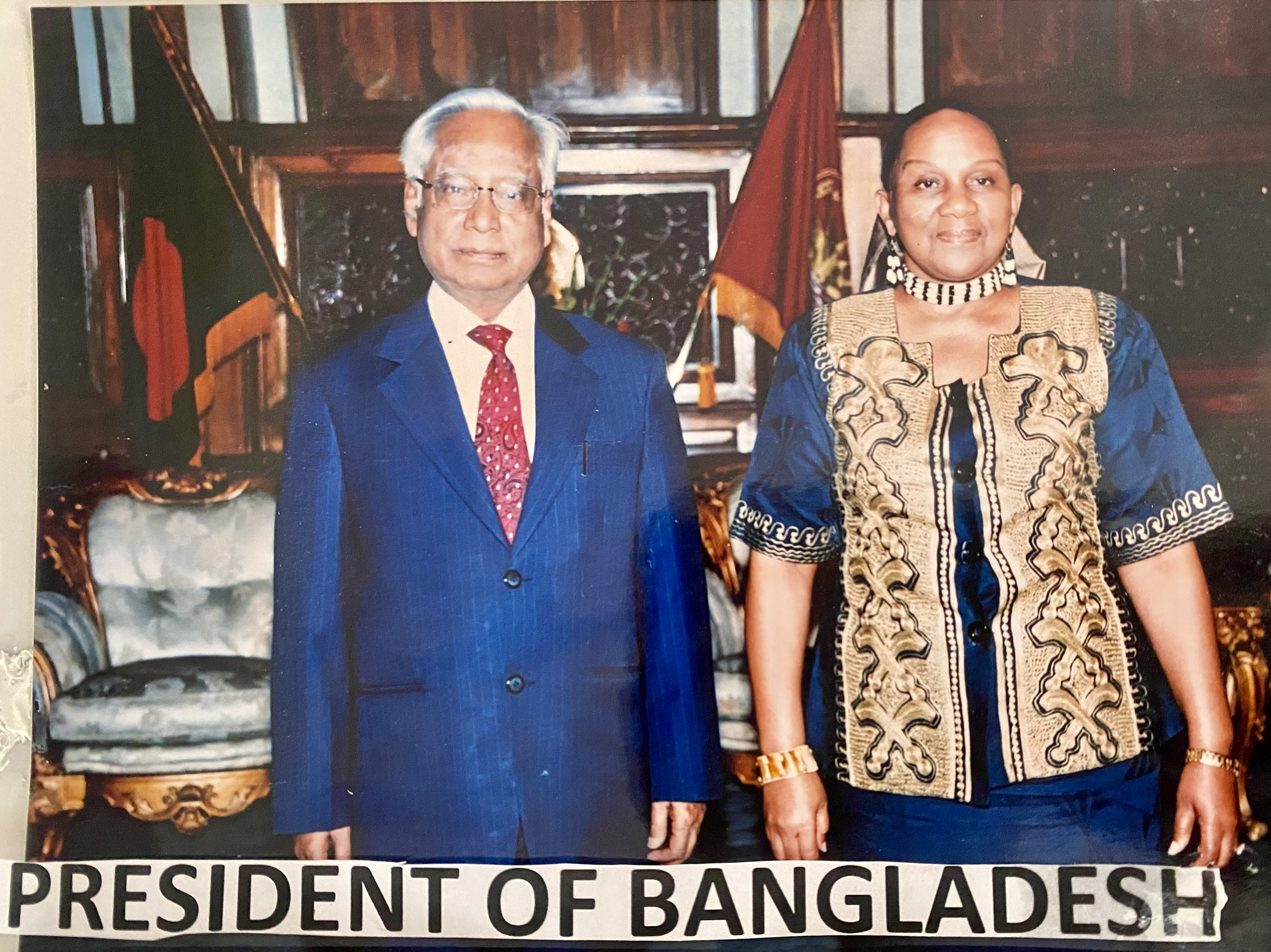
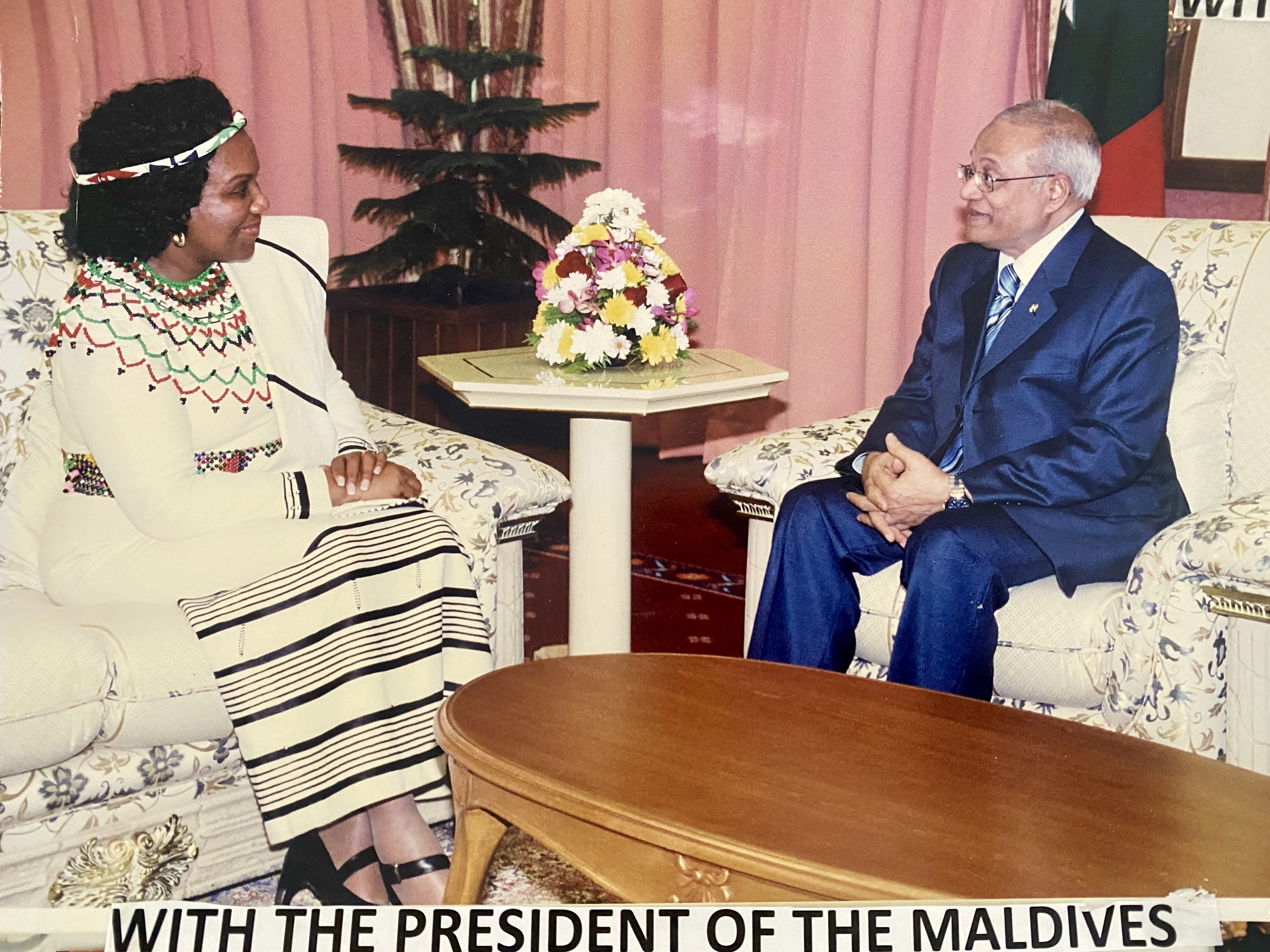

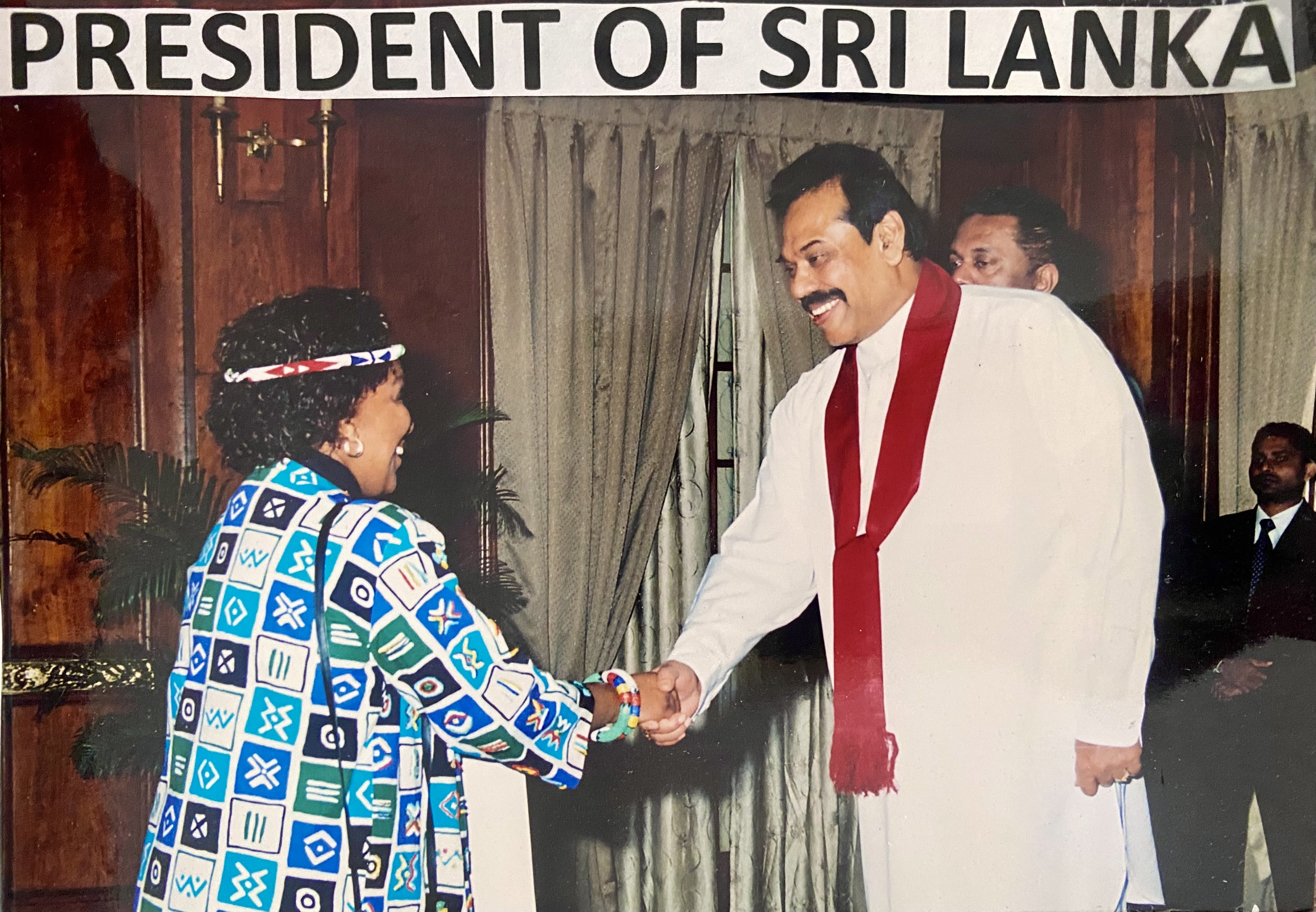
B.M Nzimande (Pheto) With President of Sri Lanka

In 2008 – 2011 she was then High Commissioner Extraordinary and Plenipotentiary of South Africa to SriLanka, Bangladesh, Maldives and Ambassador Extraordinary and Plenipotentiary to Nepal. As first resident Ambassador / High Commissioner in this region, she introduced successful strategies and programs focusing on promotion of trade and tourism to South Africa. She oversaw an outstanding promotion of Soccer World Cup 2010 leading to exceptional increase in visits to South Africa during and after the world cup.

== Personal life ==
She was married to Themba E. Nzimande, an intellectual, Genealogist Researcher and Author who died in 2019. Together, they had three children: Dalifa Nzimande, Mbali Nzimande and Khwezi Nzimande.
