= List of National Assembly members of the 22nd Parliament of South Africa =

1st National Assembly
2nd	→
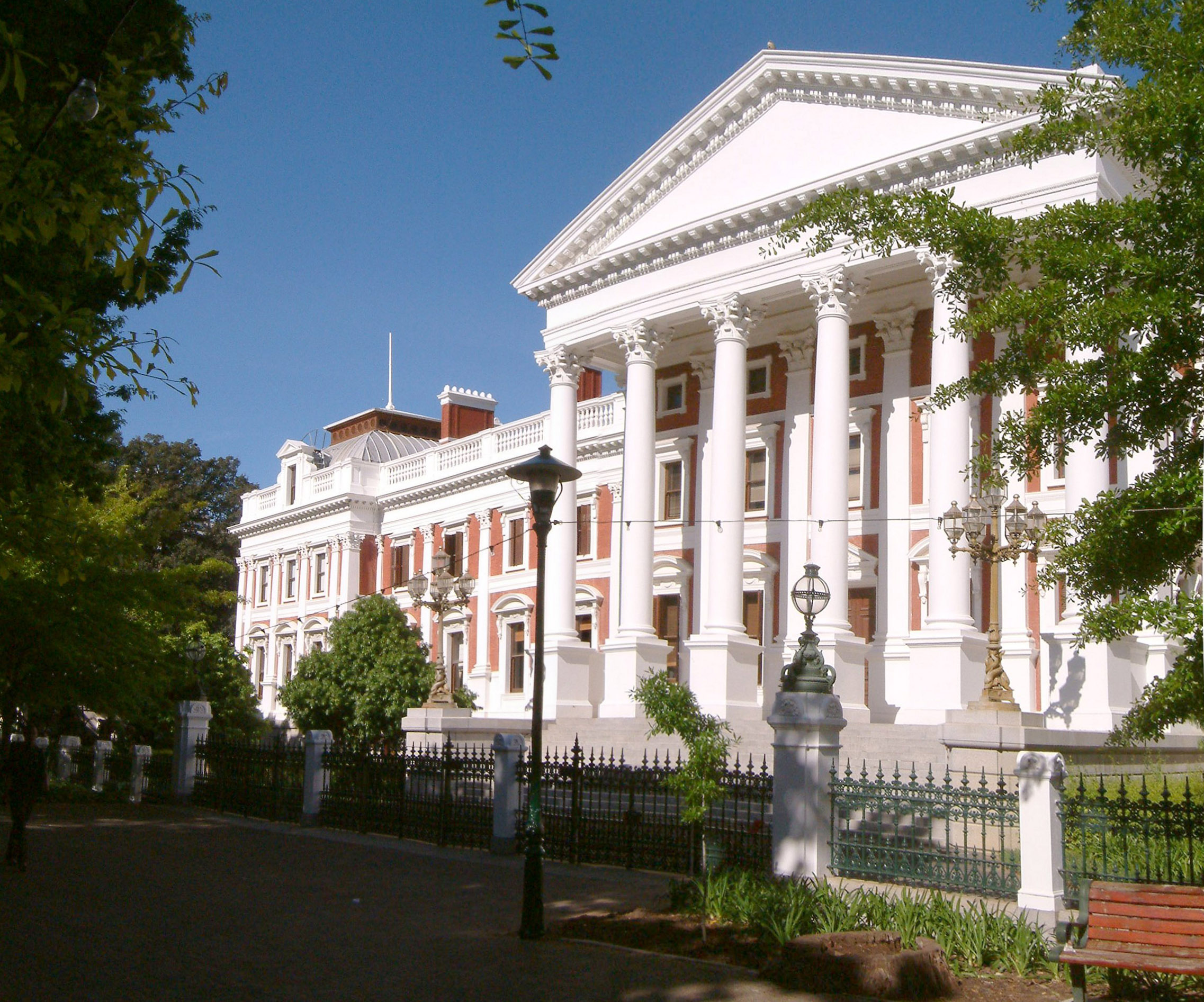
- Houses of Parliament, Cape Town

Overview
- Legislative body: National Assembly of South Africa
- Jurisdiction: South Africa
- Meeting place: Houses of Parliament
- Term: 9 May 1994 – June 1999
- Election: 27 April 1994
- Members: 400
- Speaker: Frene Ginwala (ANC)
- Deputy Speaker: Bhadra Ranchod (NP); Baleka Mbete (ANC)
- President: Nelson Mandela (ANC)
- Leader of the Opposition: F. W. de Klerk (NP); Marthinus van Schalkwyk (NP)
- Cabinet: Government of National Unity
- Party control: African National Congress

This article lists the members of the National Assembly of South Africa during the 22nd South African Parliament, which sat between 1994 and 1999. Members were elected during the elections of 27 April 1994, South Africa's first under universal suffrage, and served until the elections of 2 June 1999. The African National Congress (ANC) won a comfortable majority of 252 seats in the 400-seat legislature. The former governing party, the National Party (NP), became the official opposition.

Nelson Mandela was elected unanimously as President of South Africa during the assembly's first sitting on 9 May 1994, which also saw members sworn in to their seats and Frene Ginwala elected as the inaugural Speaker of the National Assembly. As required by the interim Constitution, the ANC formed a Government of National Unity under President Mandela.

On 24 May 1994, the first session of the Constitutional Assembly was held, comprising the joint membership of the National Assembly and the Senate. The Constitutional Assembly, chaired by Cyril Ramaphosa of the National Assembly, adopted South Africa's post-apartheid Constitution on 8 May 1996.

== Composition ==
The table below shows the number of seats won by each party in the elections of 27 April 1994.

Party	Seats
African National Congress	252
National Party	82
Inkatha Freedom Party	43
Freedom Front	9
Democratic Party	7
Pan Africanist Congress	5
African Christian Democratic Party	2

== Members ==
The following lists the Members of the National Assembly as of 3 June 1998.

Member	Party	Notes
Michael Abraham	IFP	
Clement Oswald Abrahams	NP	Appointed during the term to fill a casual vacancy.
Liz Abrahams	ANC	Appointed in 1995 to fill a casual vacancy.
Theo Alant	NP	
Jacobus Albertyn	NP	
Ahmed Ally	IFP	
Ken Andrew	DP	
Marthinus Appelgryn	NP	
Jonathan Arendse	ANC	
Kader Asmal	ANC	
Margaretha Badenhorst	NP	
Dirk Bakker	NP	
Ngconde Balfour	ANC	Appointed in 1996 to fill a casual vacancy.
Sponono Baloyi	ANC	
Jillian Bam	ANC	Appointed during the term to fill a casual vacancy.
Anoop Beesham	NP	Appointed during the term to fill a casual vacancy.
Hennie Bekker	NP	
Sakhiwo Belot	ANC	Appointed during the term to fill a casual vacancy.
Sibusiso Bengu	ANC	
Jean Benjamin	ANC	Appointed in 1997 to fill a casual vacancy.
Coetzee Bester	NP	
Andries Beyers	NP	
Fezile Bhengu	ANC	
Ike Bikitsha	NP	
Bhekizwe Biyela	IFP	
Nokwethemba Biyela	ANC	Appointed during the term to fill a casual vacancy.
Adriaan Blaas	NP	
Dennis Bloem	ANC	Appointed in 1997 to fill a casual vacancy.
Mnyamezeli Booi	ANC	
Con Botha	NP	Appointed during the term to fill a casual vacancy.
Ntombazana Botha	ANC	Appointed in 1997 to fill a casual vacancy.
Willem Abraham Botha	FF	
Willem Jabobus Botha	FF	
Brian Bunting	ANC	
Mangosuthu Buthelezi	IFP	
Sheila Camerer	NP	
Rosemary Capa	ANC	Appointed during the term to fill a casual vacancy.
Glen Carelse	NP	
Yunus Carrim	ANC	
Farouk Cassim	IFP	
Esme Chait	NP	
Judy Chalmers	ANC	
Patrick Chauke	ANC	
Laloo Chiba	ANC	
Moss Chikane	ANC	
Joseph Chiolé	FF	
Fatima Chohan-Khota	ANC	Appointed in 1996 to fill a casual vacancy.
David Chuenyane	NP	
Mietha Coetzee-Kasper	ANC	
Pieter Willem Coetzer	NP	
Pierre Carel Cronjé	ANC	
Pauline Cupido	NP	
David Dalling	ANC	
Mavhuthu Davhana	ANC	
Rob Davies	ANC	
Sam de Beer	NP	
Johnny de Lange	ANC	
Patricia de Lille	PAC	
Johannes Francois de Wet	NP	Appointed during the term to fill a casual vacancy.
Phillip Dexter	ANC	
Nelson Diale	ANC	Appointed during the term to fill a casual vacancy.
Thoko Didiza	ANC	
Bathabile Dlamini	ANC	
Beauty Dlulane	ANC	Appointed in 1997 to fill a casual vacancy.
Geoff Doidge	ANC	
Cobus Dowry	NP	
William Duna	ANC	
Dirk du Toit	ANC	
Malcolm Dyani	PAC	
Ebrahim Ebrahim	ANC	
Gora Ebrahim	PAC	
Colin Eglin	DP	
Mike Ellis	DP	
Alec Erwin	ANC	
Litsila Fani	ANC	
Felix Fankomo	ANC	
Buyiswa Fazzie	ANC	
Henry Fazzie	ANC	Appointed during the term to fill a casual vacancy.
Andrew Feinstein	ANC	Appointed in 1997 to fill a casual vacancy.
Elred Ferreira	IFP	
Ben Fihla	ANC	
André Fourie	NP	
Willem Lodewikus Fourie	NP	Appointed during the term to fill a casual vacancy.
Geraldine Fraser-Moleketi	ANC	
Thembeka Gamndana	ANC	Appointed during the term to fill a casual vacancy.
Ela Gandhi	ANC	
Sipho Gcabashe	ANC	
Ivy Gcina	ANC	
Boy Geldenhuys	NP	
Cyril George	NP	
Mluleki George	ANC	
Douglas Gibson	DP	
Mabhuza Gininda	ANC	
Frene Ginwala	ANC	
John Gogotya	NP	
Mbulelo Goniwe	ANC	
Alwyn Goosen	ANC	
Kobus Gous	NP	Appointed during the term to fill a casual vacancy.
Devagie Govender	NP	
Pregs Govender	ANC	
David Graaff	NP	
Louis Green	ACDP	
Pieter Grobbelaar	FF	
Pieter Groenewald	FF	
Roelie Groenewald	NP	
Archie Gumede	ANC	
Donald Gumede	ANC	Appointed in 1995 to fill a casual vacancy.
Bertha Gxowa	ANC	
Fatima Hajaig	ANC	
Derek Hanekom	ANC	
Nomatyala Hangana	ANC	
Limpho Hani	ANC	
Peter Hendrickse	ANC	
Nomvula Hlangwana	ANC	Appointed in 1996 to fill a casual vacancy.
Mhlabunzima Hlengwa	IFP	
Willie Hofmeyr	ANC	
Barbara Hogan	ANC	
Bantu Holomisa	ANC	
Patekile Holomisa	ANC	
Priscilla Jana	ANC	
Arrie van Rensburg	NP	
Essop Jassat	ANC	
Danny Jordaan	ANC	
Pallo Jordan	ANC	
Ronnie Kasrils	ANC	
Ahmed Kathrada	ANC	
James Kati	ANC	Appointed during the term to fill a casual vacancy.
Nkenke Kekana	ANC	
Derek Keys	NP	
Qalas Kgauwe	ANC	
Baleka Kgositsile	ANC	
Jomo Khasu	ANC	
Themba Khoza	IFP	
Tersia King	NP	
Paul Kleinsmidt	NP	Appointed during the term to fill a casual vacancy.
Ncumisa Kondlo	ANC	
Nic Koornhof	NP	
Zoliswa Kota	ANC	
Ellen Kuzwayo	ANC	
Luwellyn Landers	ANC	
Donald Lee	NP	
Serake Leeuw	ANC	
Kgaogelo Lekgoro	ANC	
Tony Leon	DP	
Wilhelm le Roux	NP	
Gilbert Ligege	ANC	
Desmond Lockey	ANC	
Hermanus Loots	ANC	
Leon Louw	FF	
Sam Louw	ANC	
Janet Love	ANC	
Eric Lucas	IFP	
Bhekizizwe Luthuli	IFP	
Brigitte Mabandla	ANC	
Rejoice Mabudafhasi	ANC	
Ntombile Mabude	ANC	
Catherine Mabuza	ANC	
Prince Madikizela	ANC	Appointed in 1995 to fill a casual vacancy.
Penuell Maduna	ANC	
Titus Mafolo	ANC	
Ace Magashule	ANC	Appointed in 1997 to fill a casual vacancy.
Mac Maharaj	ANC	
Fish Mahlalela	ANC	
Gwen Mahlangu	ANC	
Mninwa Mahlangu	ANC	
Ndaweni Mahlangu	ANC	
Farida Mahomed	ANC	Appointed during the term to fill a casual vacancy.
Sophie Maine	ANC	
Ntate John Makume	ANC	
Thabang Makwetla	ANC	
Jenny Malan	NP	
Lorna Maloney	ANC	
Maureen Malumise	ANC	
Winnie Mandela	ANC	
Zwelinjani Kortman Mangaliso	NP	
Salie Manie	ANC	
Trevor Manuel	ANC	
Nosiviwe Mapisa	ANC	
Johan André Marais	NP	
Gill Marcus	ANC	
Johannes Wessels Maree	NP	
Cornelius Marivate	ANC	Appointed in 1996 to fill a casual vacancy.
Inka Mars	IFP	
David Walter Marsh	ANC	Appointed during the term to fill a casual vacancy.
Beatrice Marshoff	ANC	
Ben Martins	ANC	
Mzwandile Masala	ANC	Appointed in 1997 to fill a casual vacancy.
Mario Masher	NP	
Ntsiki Mashimbye	ANC	
Piet Mathebe	ANC	
Pat Matosa	ANC	Appointed in 1997 to fill a casual vacancy.
Piet Matthee	NP	
Joe Matthews	IFP	
Maggie Maunye	ANC	Appointed in 1996 to fill a casual vacancy.
John Mavuso	NP	Appointed during the term to fill a casual vacancy.
Wendy Mayimele	ANC	
Thabo Mbeki	ANC	
Baleka Mbete	ANC	Appointed during the term to fill a casual vacancy.
Roy Mbongwe	IFP	
Tito Mboweni	ANC	
Lindiwe Mbuyazi	IFP	
Vusumuzi John Mchunu	NP	Appointed during the term to fill a casual vacancy.
Patrick McKenzie	NP	Appointed in 1996 to fill a casual vacancy.
Shepherd Mdladlana	ANC	
Jurie Mentz	IFP	
Kenneth Meshoe	ACDP	
Senzo Mfayela	IFP	
Nosisa Mfono	ANC	Appointed during the term to fill a casual vacancy.
Mighty Mgidi	ANC	
Smangaliso Mkhatshwa	ANC	
Bheki Mkhize	ANC	Appointed in 1995 to fill a casual vacancy.
Phumzile Mlambo	ANC	
Andrew Mlangeni	ANC	
Albert Mncwango	IFP	
Garth Mngomezulu	ANC	
Louis Mnguni	ANC	
Zenani Mnguni	NP	
Peter Moatshe	ANC	
Joe Modise	ANC	
Thandi Modise	ANC	
Lewele Modisenyane	ANC	
Sam Moeti	ANC	
Stanley Mogoba	PAC	Appointed in 1995 to fill a casual vacancy.
Abdul Ganie Mohamed	NP	
Ismail Mohamed	ANC	
George Mohlamonyane	ANC	
Peter Mokaba	ANC	
Koko Mokgalong	ANC	Appointed in 1995 to fill a casual vacancy.
Casca Mokitlane	ANC	
Aubrey Mokoena	ANC	
Lameck Mokoena	ANC	
Rapu Molekane	ANC	
Bernard Molewa	ANC	
Jannie Momberg	ANC	
Dan Montsitsi	ANC	
Valli Moosa	ANC	
Mandisi Mpahlwa	ANC	
Mtutuzeli Mpehle	ANC	Appointed in 1995 to fill a casual vacancy.
Alfred Mpontshane	IFP	Appointed in 1996 to fill a casual vacancy.
Mandla Msomi	IFP	
Sankie Mthembi-Mahanyele	ANC	
Linda Mti	ANC	
Lionel Mtshali	IFP	
Nomsa Mtsweni	ANC	Appointed during the term to fill a casual vacancy.
Mike Muendane	PAC	Appointed during the term to fill a casual vacancy.
Sydney Mufamadi	ANC	
Corné Mulder	FF	
Pieter Mulder	FF	
Gezane Mushwana	ANC	
Mavivi Myakayaka	ANC	
Sipo Mzimela	IFP	
Abraham Mzizi	IFP	
Jay Naidoo	ANC	
Billy Nair	ANC	
John Henry Nash	ANC	
John Ncinane	ANC	
Bernard Ncube	ANC	
David Ndawonde	ANC	
Muzivukile Curnick Ndlovu	ANC	
Velaphi Ndlovu	IFP	
Jerry Ndou	ANC	Appointed during the term to fill a casual vacancy.
Samson Ndou	ANC	Appointed during the term to fill a casual vacancy.
Hermanthkumar Neerahoo	IFP	
Andries Nel	ANC	
Maans Nel	NP	
Munyadziwa Netshimbupfe	ANC	
Harriet Ngubane	IFP	
Lindiwe Ngwane	ANC	
Lydia Ngwenya	ANC	
Joe Nhlanhla	ANC	
Nathi Nhleko	ANC	
Keppies Niemann	NP	
Makho Njobe	ANC	
Abe Nkomo	ANC	
Duma Nkosi	ANC	
Eileen Nkosi-Shandu	IFP	
Kuku Nqwemesha	NP	
Tsediso Emmanuel Ntaopane	ANC	
Thembile Ntsizi	NP	
Bongi Ntuli	ANC	
Mamabolo Nwedamutswu	ANC	
Samuel Nxumalo	ANC	
Dorothy Nyembe	ANC	
Blade Nzimande	ANC	
Buyisiwe Nzimande	IFP	
Alfred Nzo	ANC	
Willem Odendaal	NP	
Dan Olifant	ANC	
Godfrey Oliphant	ANC	
Reggie Oliphant	ANC	Appointed during the term to fill a casual vacancy.
Kierin O'Malley	IFP	Appointed during the term to fill a casual vacancy.
Dullah Omar	ANC	
Gert Oosthuizen	NP	
Desmond Padiachey	NP	
Aziz Pahad	ANC	
Essop Pahad	ANC	
Naledi Pandor	ANC	
Nomasonto Phakathi	ANC	
Macfarlan Phenethi	NP	Appointed during the term to fill a casual vacancy.
Stephen Phohlela	ANC	
Sakkie Pretorius	NP	
Jac Rabie	NP	
Ruth Rabinowitz	IFP	Appointed in 1997 to replace Walter Felgate.
Jeff Radebe	ANC	
Kisten Rajoo	IFP	
Vhambelani Ramabulana	ANC	
George Ramaremisa	NP	
Mewa Ramgobin	ANC	
Maria Rantho	ANC	Appointed during the term to fill a casual vacancy.
Tenda Ratshitanga	ANC	Appointed during the term to fill a casual vacancy.
Maggie Ratsoma	NP	Appointed during the term to fill a casual vacancy.
Anthony Edgar Reeves	NP	Appointed during the term to fill a casual vacancy.
Rodney Rhoda	NP	
Ismail Richards	ANC	
Selby Ripinga	ANC	
Marius Robertsen	ANC	Appointed in 1995 to fill a casual vacancy.
Gregory Rockman	ANC	
Nozizwe Madlala-Routledge	ANC	
Cassim Saloojee	ANC	
Manie Schoeman	NP	
Renier Schoeman	NP	
Fanus Schoeman	NP	
Mpho Scott	ANC	
Sybil Seaton	IFP	
Priscilla Sekgobela	ANC	
Mittah Seperepere	ANC	
Reggie September	ANC	
Wally Serote	ANC	
Susan Shabangu	ANC	
Tinyiko Shilubana	ANC	
Gertrude Shope	ANC	
Ntombi Shope	ANC	
Stella Sigcau	ANC	
Alice Sigcawu	ANC	
Richard Sikakane	ANC	
Stan Simmons	NP	Appointed during the term to fill a casual vacancy.
Heera Kasri Singh	IFP	Appointed during the term to fill a casual vacancy.
Lalita Singh	IFP	
Albertina Sisulu	ANC	
Lindiwe Sisulu	ANC	
Max Sisulu	ANC	
Windvoel Mahlangu	ANC	Appointed during the term to fill a casual vacancy.
Ben Skosana	IFP	
Zola Skweyiya	ANC	
Jan Slabbert	IFP	
Joe Slovo	ANC	
Hennie Smit	NP	
Peter Smith	IFP	
Dene Smuts	DP	
Gassan Solomon	ANC	Appointed in 1994 to fill a casual vacancy.
Buyelwa Sonjica	ANC	
Jabu Sosibo	ANC	Appointed during the term to fill a casual vacancy.
Johan Steenkamp	NP	
Myburgh Streicher	NP	
Daryl Swanepoel	NP	Appointed in 1997 to fill a casual vacancy.
Adelaide Tambo	ANC	
Elizabeth Thabethe	ANC	
Barbara Thomson	ANC	Appointed in 1995 to fill a casual vacancy.
Moosa Tiry	ANC	
Jack Tolo	ANC	Appointed during the term to fill a casual vacancy.
Lechesa Tsenoli	ANC	Appointed in 1995 to fill a casual vacancy.
Manto Tshabalala	ANC	
Ntshadi Tsheole	ANC	
Josephine Tshivhase	ANC	
Steve Tshwete	ANC	
Ben Turok	ANC	Appointed during the term to fill a casual vacancy.
Mary Turok	ANC	
Ntombikayise Twala	ANC	Appointed during the term to fill a casual vacancy.
Ismail Vadi	ANC	
Randall van den Heever	ANC	
Albertus van der Merwe	NP	Appointed during the term to fill a casual vacancy.
Koos van der Merwe	IFP	
Susan van der Merwe	ANC	Appointed in 1996 to fill a casual vacancy.
Frik van Deventer	NP	
Frik van Heerden	NP	
Marthinus van Schalkwyk	NP	
Anna van Wyk	NP	
Isak Dawid van Zyl	NP	
Melanie Verwoerd	ANC	
Bavumile Vilakazi	ANC	
Jeanette Vilakazi	IFP	
Mthunzi Vilakazi	ANC	
Constand Viljoen	FF	
Valerie Viljoen	ANC	
Suzanne Vos	IFP	
Watty Watson	NP	
Abe Williams	NP	
Noel John Williams	ANC	Appointed during the term to fill a casual vacancy.
Gavin Woods	IFP	
Chris Wyngaard	NP	
Lulama Xingwana	ANC	
Tony Yengeni	ANC	
Dingaan Zitha	ANC	
Paul Zondo	ANC	Appointed during the term to fill a casual vacancy.
Mcwayizeni Zulu	ANC	
Nhlanhla Zulu	IFP	Appointed in 1995 to fill a casual vacancy.
Nkosazana Zuma	ANC	

== Former Members ==
The following lists former Members of the National Assembly who were elected in the April 1994 election, but who left their seats before 3 June 1998.

Member	Party	Term start	Notes
Feroza Adam	ANC	May 1994	Died in 1994.
Omar Ahmed	ANC	May 1994	
Pik Botha	NP	May 1994	
Thozamile Botha	ANC	May 1994	
Wynand Breytenbach	NP	May 1994	Resigned in 1994.
Ismail Cachalia	ANC	May 1994	
Max Coleman	ANC	May 1994	Resigned in 1995.
Johnny Copelyn	ANC	May 1994	Resigned in 1997.
F. W. De Klerk	NP	May 1994	
Dawie de Villers	NP	May 1994	
Collins Chabane	ANC	May 1994	
Zingile Dingani	ANC	May 1994	
Chris Dlamini	ANC	May 1994	
Tshenuwani Farisani	ANC	May 1994	
Walter Felgate	IFP	May 1994	Resigned in 1997.
Jennifer Ferguson	ANC	May 1994	Resigned in 1997.
Chris Fismer	NP	May 1994	
Greg Fredericks	ANC	May 1994	
Faith Gasa	IFP	May 1994	Resigned in 1995.
Marcel Golding	ANC	May 1994	Resigned in 1997.
Pravin Gordhan	ANC	May 1994	Resigned in 1998.
Melt Hamman	NP	May 1994	
Francois Jacobsz	NP	May 1994	Resigned in 1996.
Josiah Jele	ANC	May 1994	
Ziba Jiyane	IFP	May 1994	
Lindiwe Mabuza	ANC	May 1994	Resigned in 1995.
Saki Macozoma	ANC	May 1994	Resigned in 1996.
Dennis Rheinallt Madide	IFP	May 1994	
James Mahlangu	ANC	May 1994	Resigned in 1995.
Nozuko Majola	ANC	May 1994	Resigned in 1996.
Dan Makhanya	NP	May 1994	
Clarence Makwetu	PAC	May 1994	
Sekhopi Malebo	ANC	May 1994	
Piet Marais	NP	May 1994	
Nana Masango	NP	May 1994	
Themba Maseko	ANC	May 1994	Resigned in 1995.
Joyce Mashamba	ANC	May 1994	Resigned in 1997.
Moses Mayekiso	ANC	May 1994	Resigned in 1996.
Roelf Meyer	NP	May 1994	Resigned in 1997.
Tobie Meyer	NP	May 1994	Resigned in 1996.
Webster Mfebe	ANC	May 1994	
Maite Mohale	ANC	May 1994	
Ruth Mompati	ANC	May 1994	Resigned in 1996.
Elias Mosunkutu	ANC	May 1994	Resigned in 1995.
Mendi Msimang	ANC	May 1994	Resigned in 1995.
Thenjiwe Mtintso	ANC	May 1994	
Gert Myburgh	NP	May 1994	Died in 1996.
Ben Ngubane	IFP	May 1994	
Carl Niehaus	ANC	May 1994	
John Nkadimeng	ANC	May 1994	
Thomas Nkobi	ANC	May 1994	Died in 1994.
Themba Jeremiah Nkosi	IFP	May 1994	
Jeff Peires	ANC	May 1994	
Dipuo Peters	ANC	May 1994	Resigned in 1997.
Ian Phillips	ANC	May 1994	Resigned in 1996.
Mzwai Piliso	ANC	May 1994	
Cyril Ramaphosa	ANC	May 1994	Resigned in 1996.
Collins Ramusi	ANC	May 1994	Died in 1996.
Bhadra Ranchod	NP	May 1994	Resigned in 1996.
Pieter Saaiman	NP	May 1994	Resigned in 1996.
Ram Salojee	ANC	May 1994	Resigned in 1996.
Jenny Schreiner	ANC	May 1994	Resigned in 1997.
Danie Schutte	NP	May 1994	
Jackie Selebi	ANC	May 1994	
Jan Serfontein	ANC	May 1994	Resigned in 1997.
Edna Sethema	ANC	May 1994	
Ka Shabangu	ANC	May 1994	
Richard Sizani	PAC	May 1994	Resigned in 1997.
Arnold Stofile	ANC	May 1994	
Raymond Suttner	ANC	May 1994	
Jan van Eck	ANC	May 1994	Resigned in 1994.
James Waugh	NP	May 1994	
Piet Welgemoed	NP	May 1994	
Leon Wessels	NP	May 1994	Resigned in 1996.
Mangisi Zitha	ANC	May 1994	
