= Jenny Malan =

South African politician

Member of the National Assembly
- In office May 1994 – June 1999

Personal details
- Citizenship: South Africa
- Party: New National Party; National Party

Jenny Malan is a South African politician and activist who represented the National Party (NP) in the National Assembly during the first democratic Parliament from 1994 to 1999. She was elected to her seat in the 1994 general election.

After leaving Parliament in 1999, Malan remained a member of the NP, by then relaunched as the New National Party (NNP), in the North West Province. In 2004, when the NNP proposed to merge with the governing African National Congress (ANC), Die Burger reported that she had abstained from the vote and did not support the merger.

== Women's activism ==
Malan's husband represented the NP as a provincial politician during apartheid, and at that time Malan was an organiser for the NP. However, during the final years of apartheid, Malan became the president of Women for South Africa (Vroue vir Suid Afrika in Afrikaans), a national umbrella group for about 200 white women's organisations, with a total of about 25,000 members. Because the organisation's aim was, in Malan's words, "to offer a home to all peace-loving women without them having to tie themselves in the political field", she withdrew from the NP during that period. Although Women for South Africa was a moderate organisation, it was rejected by right-wing whites because of its (limited) cooperation with black women's groups; during the democratic transition, Malan was one of three Afrikaner women who was invited by the ANC Women's League to participate in founding the Women's National Coalition.
