= Devagie Govender =

South African politician (born 1934)

Member of the National Assembly
- In office May 1994 – June 1999

Personal details
- Born: 21 January 1934 (age 92)
- Citizenship: South Africa
- Party: National Party; New National Party

Devagie Govender (born 21 January 1934) is a retired South African politician who represented the National Party (NP) in the National Assembly during the first democratic Parliament. She was elected in the 1994 general election. Ahead of the 1999 general election, the NP's successor party, the New National Party, nominated her to stand for re-election, but she was ranked 36th on the party's regional list for KwaZulu-Natal and did not secure a seat.

Educated at the University of Natal, Govender was a lawyer and educationist by profession and participated in the Convention for a Democratic South Africa.
