= Albertus van der Merwe =

South African politician

Member of the National Assembly
- In office until April 2004
- Constituency: Free State

Personal details
- Born: Albertus Stephanus van der Merwe; 3 November 1940 (age 84)
- Citizenship: South Africa
- Political party: New National Party; National Party

Albertus Stephanus van der Merwe (born 3 November 1940) is a retired South African politician who represented the National Party (NP) and New National Party (NNP) in the National Assembly. He was not initially elected in the 1994 general election but joined the assembly during the first democratic Parliament, filling a casual vacancy. He was re-elected to a full term in the 1999 general election as one of the NNP's three representatives in the Free State.
