= Nokwethemba =

Nokwethemba is a feminine given name. Notable people with the name include:

- Nokwethemba Biyela (born 1954), South African politician
- Nokwethemba Mtshweni (fl. from 2024), South African politician
