= Zenani Mnguni =

South African politician (born 1931)

Member of the National Assembly
- In office 1994–1999

Personal details
- Born: Zenani David Mnguni; 10 October 1931
- Citizenship: South Africa
- Party: National Party; New National Party

Zenani David Mnguni (born 10 October 1931) is a retired South African politician who represented the National Party in the National Assembly during the first democratic Parliament from 1994 to 1999. He was elected to his seat in the 1994 general election. He stood for re-election in 1999 as a candidate in the Mpumalanga constituency, but his party did not win any seats in the province and he did not win a seat.
