= Carelse =

Carelse is a surname. Notable people with the surname include:

- Adriaan Carelse (born 1995), South African rugby player
- Brent Carelse (born 1981), South African football player
- Gawie Carelse (1941–2002), South African rugby player
- Glen Carelse, South African politician
- Martin Carelse (born 1980), South African football player
- Ramsay Carelse (born 1985), South African high jumper
- Winston Carelse (born 1945), South African cricketer
- Zeenat Carelse (born 1966), South African judge
