= Molewa =

Molewa is a surname. Notable people with the surname include:

- Bernard Molewa (1921–2004), South African politician and activist
- Edna Molewa (1957–2018), South African politician
