= Johnny de Wet =

South African politician

Personal details
- Born: Johannes Francois de Wet; 9 April 1943 (age 81)
- Citizenship: South Africa
- Political party: National Party; New National Party

Johannes Francois de Wet (born 9 April 1943) is a retired South African politician who represented the National Party in the National Assembly during the first democratic Parliament. He was not initially elected in the 1994 general election but was sworn in during the term to fill a casual vacancy. He stood for re-election in 1999 as a candidate in the KwaZulu-Natal constituency, but he did not win a seat.
