= David Marsh =

David Marsh may refer to:

== Arts, media, and entertainment ==
- Dave Marsh (1950–2026), American music critic
- Dave Marsh (game developer) (born 1964), American video game designer
- Dave Marsh (musician) (born 1963), Canadian musician

== Athletes ==
- David Marsh (cyclist) (1894–1960), who represented Great Britain at the 1920 Summer Olympics
- David Marsh (golfer) (1934–2022), British amateur golfer and chairman of Everton Football Club
- David Marsh (swimming coach) (born 1958), men's and women's swimming and diving coach at Auburn University

== Business and politics ==
- David Marsh (financial specialist) (born 1952), British financial specialist, business consultant and writer
- David Marsh (political scientist) (born 1946), British political scientist
- David Walter Marsh, South African politician
