= James Waugh (politician) =

South African politician

Personal details
- Born: James Charles Norval Waugh; 22 December 1957 (age 67)
- Citizenship: South Africa
- Political party: National Party; New National Party

James Charles Norval Waugh (born 22 December 1957) is a South African politician who represented the National Party in the National Assembly during the first democratic Parliament. He was elected in the 1994 general election, though he did not complete the term in his seat. He went on to serve in the KwaZulu-Natal Provincial Legislature, as well as provincial secretary of the New National Party's KwaZulu-Natal branch.

During apartheid, Waugh was a member of the President's Council in the Tricameral Parliament.
