= Curnick Ndlovu =

South African activist and trade unionist (1932–2002)

Member of the National Assembly
- In office 1994–1999

Personal details
- Born: Muzivukile Curnick Ndlovu; 27 July 1932 Matatiele, Transkei; Cape Province, Union of South Africa
- Died: 22 May 2002 (aged 69) Sherwood, Durban; KwaZulu-Natal, South Africa
- Party: African National Congress
- Spouse: Beauty Rose Ndlovu

Muzivukile Curnick Ndlovu (27 July 1932 – 22 May 2002), also spelled Muzuvukile, was a South African politician, anti-apartheid activist, and trade unionist. A veteran of the African National Congress, he represented the party in the National Assembly during the first democratic Parliament from 1994 to 1999. He was also a former national chairperson of the United Democratic Front, a former secretary of the Railway and Harbour Workers' Union, and a former regional commander of Umkhonto we Sizwe (MK) in Natal Province.

Born in the Transkei, Ndlovu rose to political prominence through the Railway and Harbour Workers' Union, an affiliate of the South African Congress of Trade Unions, which he joined in 1956 while a railway worker in Natal. He was an early recruit to MK and served as head of its inaugural regional command in Natal from 1961 to 1963. Following his arrest in June 1963, he was convicted of involvement in MK's sabotage campaign and sentenced to twenty years' imprisonment, served primarily on Robben Island. After his release from prison in September 1983, Ndlovu became active in the Natal branch of the United Democratic Front, and he was elected as the front's chairperson in 1985.

== Early life and education ==
Ndlovu was born in Matatiele in the Transkei on 27 July 1932. He was one of two sons born to Josiah Ndlovu, a railway worker, and Amelia Ndlovu. He grew up with his maternal grandparents in Matatiele, where he attended primary school before enrolling for his junior certificate at the Polela Institute in Bulwer in the former Natal Province. Later, while serving his prison sentence, he completed his matric.

== Anti-apartheid activism ==
In 1950, Ndlovu sought to join his parents in Durban, but he had difficulty obtaining a permit to live in the area as required by apartheid-era legislation. He worked at a glass factory in Dundee until 1953, when he was granted a permit to live with his family in Cato Manor in Durban. While there, he was a tog labourer on the railways until 1955, when he found a permanent job as a railway worker. Politicised by his experience with the pass laws and with hard labour, he became politically active, joining the Railway and Harbour Workers' Union in 1956 as a shop steward. He also joined the anti-apartheid African National Congress (ANC).

In 1958, forced removals under the Group Areas Act compelled Ndlovu and his family to move from Cato Manor to KwaMashu. Late the following year, Ndlovu was hospitalised with tuberculosis, and he remained in hospital throughout the 1960 Sharpeville massacre and subsequent political crackdown and state of emergency. Upon his release in 1961, he returned to his political activity: he was a founding member and secretary of the KwaMashu Residents' Association, and he succeeded Moses Mabhida, who had left the country for exile, as secretary of the Railway and Harbour Workers' Union. When Billy Nair was banned in 1962, Ndlovu took over as regional secretary of the South African Congress of Trade Unions (SACTU) in Natal, and the following year he joined SACTU's national executive committee.

=== Umkhonto we Sizwe command: 1961–1963 ===
In addition, Ndlovu was among the first in Natal to join the ANC's armed wing, Umkhonto we Sizwe (MK), after it was founded in December 1961; he served as the head of the MK regional command in Natal, reporting to MK commander Nelson Mandela and then, after Mandela's arrest, to Raymond Mhlaba. Other members of MK in Natal included Billy Nair, Ebrahim Ebrahim, Ronnie and Eleanor Kasrils, and David Ndawonde, and together the regional command orchestrated a programme of sabotage against government installations, including attacks on government offices, telephone installations, and the railway line. Decades later, at the post-apartheid Truth and Reconciliation Commission in 2000, Ndlovu applied for and was granted amnesty for his involvement in two incidents of sabotage, near Durban in 1961 and 1963 respectively.

=== Sabotage trial and imprisonment: 1963–1983 ===
In April 1963, the apartheid government served Ndlovu with a banning order which restricted him to KwaMashu. Two months later, on 25 June 1963, he and several other Natal MK operatives were arrested. After a period of police detention at Isipingo and Durban North, Ndlovu was taken to Pietermaritzburg to stand trial under the Sabotage Act; he and eighteen others were accused of twenty-seven acts of sabotage in Natal, in addition to possession of explosives and recruitment of military trainees. An MK operative, Bruno Mtolo, gave evidence for the state. On 28 February 1964, at the end of what is sometimes known as the Spear of the Nation Trial, all but one of the defendants were convicted. Ndlovu and Nair were sentenced to twenty years' imprisonment.

In March 1964, Ndlovu was transferred from Pretoria's Leeuwkop Prison to Robben Island, where he served eighteen years of his sentence. During this period, in 1967, the apartheid government listed Ndlovu as a communist, meaning that it was illegal to quote him inside South Africa. At the tail-end of his prison sentence, he was transferred to Helderstroom Prison in Caledon and granted a minor remission of sentence; he was released five months early, on 27 September 1983.

=== United Democratic Front: 1983–1991 ===
Upon his release from prison, Ndlovu returned to KwaMashu and became active in the recently established United Democratic Front (UDF). He was the regional organiser for Natal during the UDF's flagship Million Signatures campaign, a petitioning campaign against the Tricameral Parliament and related constitutional reform. In April 1985, at that year's UDF's national general council in Krugersdorp, he was elected as national chairperson of the UDF. He was detained later in 1985 and went into hiding to evade arrest during the state of emergency imposed the following year.

== Post-apartheid political career ==
In South Africa's first post-apartheid general election in April 1994, Ndlovu was elected to represent the ANC in the National Assembly of the first democratic Parliament. He was a member of Parliament's Portfolio Committee on Labour. He served a single five-year term in his seat: although he was listed as an ANC candidate in the 1999 general election, he retired after the election due to ill health.

== Personal life and death ==
Ndlovu was married to Beauty Rose Ndlovu, with whom he had one child, a daughter named Zethu. He died from cancer at the Highway Hospice in Sherwood, Durban, on 22 May 2002.

Durban's M25 highway is named after Ndlovu.

== See also ==
- History of the African National Congress
- List of National Assembly members of the 22nd Parliament
