= Macfarlane Phenethi =

South African politician and clergyman

Member of the National Assembly
- In office until November 1998

Personal details
- Citizenship: South Africa
- Party: United Democratic Movement
- Other political affiliations: National Party

Malefane Macfarlane Pheneti is a South African politician and Christian minister. He represented the National Party (NP) in the National Assembly during the first democratic Parliament, until he resigned to join the United Democratic Movement (UDM).

== Life and career ==
Ahead of the 1994 general election, South Africa's first post-apartheid elections, a personal endorsement from Pheneti featured in the NP's campaign posters: he was quoted as saying, "The NP apologized. As a Christian I accept that. The NP is now the party for me". He was not initially elected to a seat in the election, but he joined the caucus during the legislative term to fill a casual vacancy. In early November 1988, he resigned to join the UDM.

He was formerly married to Freda Phenethi, who was a nurse and later became an artist and designer.
