= Thembile Ntsizi =

South African politician

Member of the National Assembly
- In office 1994–1999

Personal details
- Born: Thembile Charles Ntsizi; 20 August 1952 (age 73)
- Citizenship: South Africa
- Party: National Party; New National Party

Thembile Charles Ntsizi (born 20 August 1952) is a South African politician who represented the National Party in the National Assembly during the first democratic Parliament from 1994 to 1999. He was elected to his seat in the 1994 general election. He stood for re-election in 1999 as a candidate in the North West constituency, but his party did not win any seats in the province and he did not win a seat.
