= Johan André Marais =

South African politician

Member of the National Assembly
- In office 1994–1999

Personal details
- Born: 25 November 1954 (age 71)
- Citizenship: South Africa
- Party: National Party; New National Party

Johan André Marais (born 25 November 1954) is a South African politician who represented the National Party in the National Assembly during the first democratic Parliament from 1994 to 1999. He was elected in the 1994 general election. He stood for re-election in 1999 as a candidate in the KwaZulu-Natal constituency, but he was ranked eighth on his party's regional party list and did not win a seat.

In the 1989 South African general election, he was elected for the House of Assembly of South Africa in Port Natal.
