= Anoop Beesham =

South African politician (born 1951)

Member of the National Assembly
- In office until June 1999

Personal details
- Born: Anoop Kumar Beesham; 4 January 1951 (age 74)
- Citizenship: South Africa
- Political party: National Party; New National Party

Anoop Kumar Beesham (born 4 January 1951) is a South African politician who represented the National Party (NP) in the National Assembly during the first democratic Parliament. Though not initially elected in the 1994 general election, he was sworn in to a seat during the legislative term. He served on the Select Committee on Arts, Culture and Language and the Select Committee on Science and Technology.

In the 1999 general election, Beshaam stood for re-election to the National Assembly, as well as for election to the KwaZulu-Natal Legislature, but he was ranked too low on the New National Party's party list to win a seat.
