= Nana Masango =

South African politician (born 1949)

Personal details
- Born: 24 March 1949 (age 77)
- Citizenship: South Africa
- Party: National Party; New National Party

Nana Eneria Masango (born 24 March 1949) is a retired South African politician who represented the National Party (NP) in the National Assembly during the first democratic Parliament. She was elected in the 1994 general election, though she resigned from her seat before the end of the legislative term. A black woman, she featured prominently in the NP's election campaign in 1994.

In the next general election in 1999, she stood for election to the Gauteng Provincial Legislature, standing as a candidate for the NP's successor party, the New National Party. She was ranked too low on the party list to secure a seat.
