= George Ramaremisa =

South African politician and colonel

Member of the National Assembly
- In office May 1994 – June 1999

Personal details
- Born: Nyambeni George Ramaremisa; 1 April 1947 (age 79)
- Citizenship: South Africa
- Party: Democratic Alliance
- Other political affiliations: New National Party; National Party

Nyambeni George Ramaremisa (born 1 April 1947) is a South African politician and retired colonel from Limpopo. He represented the National Party (NP) in the National Assembly during the first democratic Parliament from 1994 to 1999. He later represented the Democratic Alliance (DA) as a local councillor in Limpopo. During apartheid, he was a member of Venda's military government.

== Early life and career ==
Ramaremisa was born on 1 April 1947. He is a retired colonel and a former member of the Council of National Unity, the military government of the Venda Defence Force that ruled the Venda Bantustan during the final years of apartheid.

== Political career ==
In South Africa's first post-apartheid elections in 1994, Ramaremisa stood as a candidate for the NP and gained election to a seat in the National Assembly, the lower house of the South African Parliament. While in Parliament, he was a strident critic of the Choice on Termination of Pregnancy Bill, which aimed to broaden access to abortion.

Ramaremisa stood for re-election in 1999, ranked second on the NNP's regional list for Limpopo (then still called the Northern Province), but the NNP did win gain any seats in the Limpopo caucus. In the same election, he stood for election to the Limpopo Provincial Legislature, also ranked second for the NNP, but the party only gained one seat in the province. In the local elections held the following year, he stood for the NNP – by way of the Democratic Alliance – as a mayoral candidate in Limpopo's Thohoyandou Municipality. He initially ran against Samson Ndou of the African National Congress, though Ndou was later replaced by local headman Norman Makumbane. Ramaremisa was sworn in as a local councillor after the election, but he was not elected mayor.
