= Desmond Padiachey =

South African politician

Member of the National Assembly
- In office May 1994 – June 1999

Personal details
- Born: 31 July 1959 (age 66)
- Citizenship: South Africa
- Party: United Democratic Movement (since 2004)
- Other political affiliations: New National Party (1997–2004); National Party (until 1997)

Desmond Kanaprekancen Padiachey (born 31 July 1959) is a South African politician who represented the National Party (NP) and one of the main members of the New National Party (NNP) in the National Assembly from 1994 to 1999. He was then offered a new position in the United Democratic Movement (UDM) in early 2004 ahead of that year's general election.

== Legislative career ==
Padiachey was born on 31 July 1959. He represented the NP in the National Assembly, the lower house of the South African Parliament, from 1994 to 1999 during the first post-apartheid Parliament. In the next general election in 1999, he stood for re-election under the banner of the NNP, the NP's successor party, but was not elected; he nonetheless remained on the party list for promotion to a parliamentary seat in the event of a casual vacancy.

Ahead of the 2004 general election, Padiachey defected to the UDM. The NNP said that he did so after being dissatisfied with his low ranking on the NNP's party list. Although he was subsequently listed as a UDM candidate in the election, he also pursued an abortive legal challenge to the NNP's party list; he withdrew the challenge in March 2004, with the NNP accusing him of ulterior political motives. Padiachey was one of the UDM's top twelve candidates in the 2004 election, but the party did not win sufficient seats to secure his return to Parliament.
