= Litsila Fani =

South African politician (born 1933)

Member of the National Assembly
- In office May 1994 – June 1999

Personal details
- Born: Litsila Macdonald Fani; 1 July 1933
- Citizenship: South Africa
- Party: African National Congress

Litsila Macdonald Fani (born 1 July 1933) is a South African politician who represented the African National Congress in the National Assembly during the first democratic Parliament from 1994 to 1999. He was elected in the 1994 general election and was a member of the Standing Committee on Public Accounts. Though he stood for re-election in 1999, he was not re-elected.
