= Kempton Park (House of Assembly of South Africa constituency) =

South African constituency, 1910–1994

- Kempton Park
- Former constituency for the South African House of Assembly
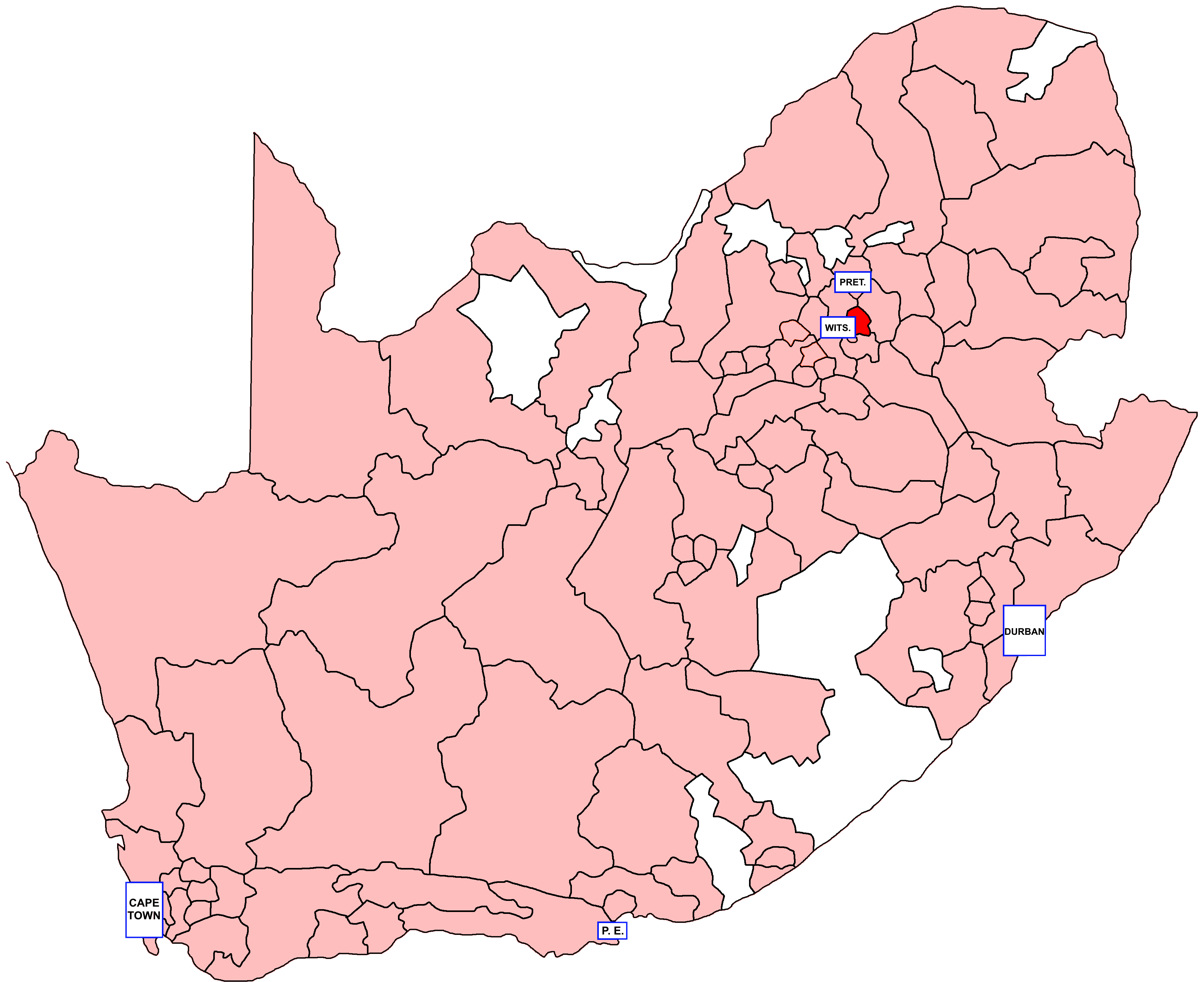
- Location of Kempton Park within South Africa (1981)
- Province: Transvaal
- Major settlements: Kempton Park

Former constituency
- Created: 1910
- Abolished: 1994
- Number of members: 1
- Replaced by: North West

Kempton Park was a constituency in the Transvaal Province of South Africa, which existed from 1910 to 1994. Named for the city of Kempton Park, throughout its existence it elected one member to the House of Assembly.

== Members ==
Election	Parliament	Member	Party	Ref.
1989	21st South African Parliament	Tersia King	NP	
