= Vusumuzi Mchunu =

South African politician

Personal details
- Born: Vusumuzi John Mchunu
- Citizenship: South Africa
- Political party: National Party

Vusumuzi John Mchunu is a South African politician who represented the National Party in the National Assembly during the first democratic Parliament. He was not initially elected in the 1994 general election but joined the assembly during the legislative term, filling a casual vacancy. He was a member of Parliament's committee on arts, culture and language, and science and technology. He did not stand for re-election in 1999.
