= Lungi Gcabashe =

South African politician (1960–2025)

The Honourable Lungi Gcabashe MP

Member of the National Assembly
- In office 21 May 2014 – 7 May 2019
- In office 15 June 2024 – 17 May 2025

Chairperson of the Portfolio Committee on Tourism
- In office 10 July 2024 – 17 May 2025
- Minister: Patricia de Lille
- Preceded by: Tandi Mahambehlala

Deputy President of the African National Congress Women's League
- In office 23 July 2023 – 17 May 2025
- President: Sisisi Tolashe
- Preceded by: Sisi Ntombela

Chairperson of the Portfolio Committee on Public Enterprises
- In office 25 October 2017 – 7 May 2019
- Minister: Lynne Brown; Pravin Gordhan
- Preceded by: Dipuo Letsatsi-Duba
- Succeeded by: Khaya Magaxa

Personal details
- Born: Lungi Annette Mnganga; 27 October 1960 KwaMashu, Natal, South Africa
- Died: 17 May 2025 (aged 64)
- Party: African National Congress
- Spouse: Sipho Gcabashe (divorced)

Lungi Annette Mnganga-Gcabashe (27 October 1960 – 17 May 2025) was a South African politician from KwaZulu-Natal who represented the African National Congress (ANC) in the National Assembly. She was the Deputy President of the ANC Women's League since July 2023.

Born in KwaMashu, Mnganga-Gcabashe was formerly a Member of the KwaZulu-Natal Provincial Legislature from 1999 to 2004 and chaired the KwaZulu-Natal branch of the ANC Women's League from 2008 to 2012. She represented the ANC in the National Assembly between 2014 and 2019, and she chaired the Portfolio Committee on Public Enterprises from 2017 to 2019 during its inquiry into maladministration at Eskom.

Thereafter Mnganga-Gcabashe took a hiatus from legislative politics, serving instead as chief of staff in the office of Pemmy Majodina, the Chief Whip of the Majority Party. She returned to the National Assembly in the May 2024 general election and was elected as chairperson of the Portfolio Committee on Tourism. She was until her death a member of the ANC's National Executive Committee, having been elected to two non-consecutive five-year terms on the committee in 2012 and 2022.

== Early life and career ==
Born on 27 October 1960, Mnganga-Gcabashe was from KwaMashu in present-day KwaZulu-Natal province. During apartheid, she was active in the United Democratic Front (UDF) and the Natal Organisation of Women, a UDF affiliate. After the African National Congress (ANC) was unbanned in 1990, she joined the interim leadership corps of local ANC and ANC Women's League (ANCWL) structures in KwaMashu. Shortly afterwards, she was recruited to work full-time in the ANC's political organising department, a job she held for several years until her resignation in mid-1997. She subsequently worked for two years in local government administration in Pinetown.

In the 1999 general election, Mnganga-Gcabashe was elected as a Member of the KwaZulu-Natal Legislature, representing the ANC, which at the time was a minority party in the legislature. During her five-year term in the legislature, she ascended the regional and provincial structures of the ANCWL; in the mid-2000s, she was elected Deputy Provincial Chairperson of the ANCWL in KwaZulu-Natal, deputising Nkosazana Dlamini-Zuma. By the end of 2008, she had succeeded Dlamini-Zuma as ANCWL Provincial Chairperson; her deputy was Dolly Shandu.

In March 2012, Mnganga-Gcabashe stood for a second term as ANCWL Provincial Chairperson but lost in a tense contest with Celiwe Madlopha. However, in May that year, she was elected to the Provincial Executive Committee of the ANC in KwaZulu-Natal; by number of votes received, she was ranked ninth of the 20 candidates elected to the committee. Then, in December, delegates to the ANC's 53rd National Conference elected Mnganga-Gcabashe to her first five-year term on the party's National Executive Committee; by number of votes received, she was ranked 16th of 80 candidates elected, receiving 1,695 votes from the roughly 4,500 voting delegates.

== National Assembly: 2014–2025 ==
=== Fifth Parliament: 2014–2019 ===
In the 2014 general election, Mnganga-Gcabashe was elected to an ANC seat in the National Assembly, the lower house of the South African Parliament; she was ranked fourth on the ANC's regional party list for KwaZulu-Natal. She served a single term in Parliament, departing after the next general election in 2019. For her first three years in Parliament, she served in the National Assembly's Portfolio Committee on Human Settlements and was the whip of the ANC's caucus in that committee.

On 20 October 2017, the ANC announced that she would be transferred to chair the Portfolio Committee on Public Enterprises; the ANC caucus formally elected her to that position on 25 October. She succeeded Dipuo Letsatsi-Duba, who had left the committee to become Deputy Minister of Public Service and Administration, and she entered the position amid a high-profile parliamentary inquiry into alleged maladministration at Eskom.

Mnganga-Gcabashe was not re-elected to the ANC National Executive Committee in 2017, but she retained the parliamentary chairmanship until 2019, when she did not seek re-election to Parliament.

=== Hiatus: 2019–2024 ===
In June 2020, the ANC announced that she had been appointed chief of staff in the office of Pemmy Majodina, the Chief Whip of the Majority Party in the National Assembly. She was returned to a second five-year term on the ANC's National Executive Committee at the party's 55th National Conference in December 2022; by popularity, she was ranked 64th of the 80 candidates elected, receiving 1,091 votes across the 4,029 ballots cast in total.

In July 2023, the ANCWL convened its first elective conference since 2015. Mnganga-Gcabashe received 325 nominations from league branches for the position of ANCWL Deputy President, the second highest amount of branch nominations behind the late Tina Joemat-Pettersson, who received 1,061 nominations. On 23 July, Mnganga-Gcabashe was named as the new ANCWL Deputy President; she received 1,661 votes while her competitors for the position, Bernice Swarts and Sylvia Lucas, received 1,190 and 62 votes, respectively.

=== Seventh Parliament: 2024–2025 ===
In the May 2024 general election, Mnganga-Gcabashe was elected to return to the National Assembly, ranked 60th on the ANC's national party list. On 10 July 2024, she was elected as chairperson of the Portfolio Committee on Tourism.

== Personal life and death ==
Mnganga-Gcabashe was formerly married to Sipho Gcabashe, a businessman and ANC politician. but the couple got divorced. She died in office on 17 May 2025, at the age of 64.
