= Willie Fourie =

South African politician

Personal details
- Born: Willem Lodewikus Fourie
- Citizenship: South Africa
- Political party: National Party

Willem Lodewikus Fourie is a retired South African politician who represented the National Party (NP) in the National Assembly during the first democratic Parliament. He was not initially elected in the 1994 general election but joined the assembly during the legislative term, filling a casual vacancy. He was the NP's spokesman on labour and was also the legal adviser to party leader Marthinus van Schalkwyk. He retired from politics at the 1999 general election.
