= Kuku Nqwemesha =

South African politician

Member of the National Assembly
- In office May 1994 – June 1999

Personal details
- Citizenship: South Africa
- Party: National Party

Kuku Winnie Nqwemesha is a South African politician who represented the National Party (NP) in the National Assembly during the first democratic Parliament from 1994 to 1999. She was elected to her seat in the 1994 general election and was a member of the parliamentary committees on welfare and the Reconstruction and Development Programme. She joined Parliament after retiring from her 35-year-long teaching career.
