= Port Natal (House of Assembly of South Africa constituency) =

South African constituency, 1910–1994

- Port Natal
- Former constituency for the South African House of Assembly
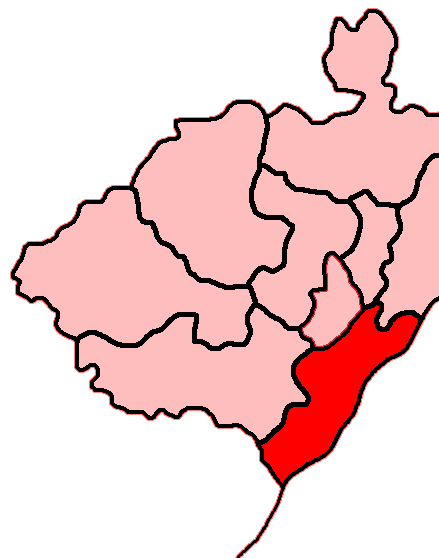
- Location of Port Natal within Durban (1981)
- Province: Natal
- Major settlements: Port Natal

Former constituency
- Created: 1910
- Abolished: 1994
- Number of members: 1
- Replaced by: KwaZulu-Natal

Port Natal was a constituency in the Natal Province of South Africa, which existed from 1910 to 1994. Named for Port Natal, throughout its existence it elected one member to the House of Assembly.

== Members ==
Election	Parliament	Member	Party	Ref.
1989	21st South African Parliament	Johan André Marais	NP	
