= Maggie Ratsoma =

South African politician

Member of the National Assembly
- In office until April 1999

Personal details
- Citizenship: South Africa
- Party: African National Congress (since April 1999)
- Other political affiliations: National Party; New National Party

Maggie Mulalife Ratsoma is a South African politician who represented the National Party (NP) and New National Party (NNP) in the National Assembly until 1999. She was not initially elected in the 1994 general election, but joined the caucus during the legislative term to fill a casual vacancy. She was chairperson of the NNP's district branch in Soshanguve, Gauteng until April 1999, when, ahead of that year's general election, Ratsoma defected from the NP to the governing African National Congress. She was not re-elected to Parliament in 1999.
