= Tersia King =

South African politician and educationist (1940–2016)

Member of the National Assembly
- In office May 1994 – June 1999
- Constituency: Gauteng

House of Assembly

Assembly Member for Kempton Park
- In office 1987–1994

Personal details
- Born: 20 October 1940
- Died: 4 December 2016 (aged 76)
- Citizenship: South Africa
- Party: New National Party; National Party
- Education: University of Pretoria; Potchefstroom University (MBA); University of South Africa (D.Ed.)

Tersia Johanna King (20 October 1940 – 4 December 2016) was a South African politician, educationist, and businesswoman. She represented the National Party (NP) in Parliament from 1987 to 1999. She also founded two private schools in Gauteng.

== Political career ==
Born on 20 October 1940, King entered frontline politics in 1977 when she became a local councillor in Kempton Park in the former Transvaal. She later joined the House of Assembly, where she represented the NP as MP for Kempton Park; she was elected to the seat in the 1987 general election.

In South Africa's first post-apartheid elections in 1994, King was elected to remain in Parliament, now in the multi-racial National Assembly. She served a single term in the seat; although she stood for re-election in the 1999 general election, she was ranked too low on the party list to gain re-election.

== Career in education ==
King has several degree's, including a bachelor's from the University of Pretoria, a doctor of education from the University of South Africa, and an MBA from Potchefstroom University. She founded two private schools: the Tersia King Learning Academy in Tembisa, initially launched as the Self Help School in 1991, and the Oos-Rand Academy (named for the East Rand) in Pomona, Kempton Park, launched in 1996. She was principal of the Oos-Rand Academy during its early years, and after leaving Parliament she was principal of the Tersia King Learning Academy.

She died on 4 December 2016.

== See also ==
- Education in South Africa
