= Chris Wyngaard =

South African politician

Member of the National Assembly
- In office May 1994 – June 1999

Personal details
- Citizenship: South Africa
- Party: Democratic Party (since 1999); New National Party (1997–99); National Party (until 1997)

Christiaan Allen Wyngaard is a South African politician who represented the National Party (NP) in the National Assembly from 1994 to 1999, having gained election in the 1994 general election.

Ahead of the 1999 general election, Wyngaard was listed 32nd on the party list of the New National Party (NNP), the NP's successor party, in the Western Cape. Wyngaard, along with Glen Carelse and Pauline Cupido, reportedly complained to the party leadership about their low ranking on the list. Several weeks later, in January 1999, he and the others announced that they would resign from the NNP to join the Democratic Party (DP). However, Wyngaard was not re-elected under the DP banner when the general election took place.
