= Mike Muendane =

South African politician (born 1944)

Personal details
- Born: Ngila Michael Muendane; 11 October 1944 (age 80)
- Citizenship: South Africa
- Political party: Pan Africanist Congress

Ngila Michael Muendane (born 11 October 1944) is a South African politician, businessman, and former anti-apartheid activist. He is the former secretary-general and former deputy president of the Pan Africanist Congress (PAC).

== Life and career ==
A former anti-apartheid activist, Muendane was imprisoned on Robben Island on a sabotage charge from 1963 to 1970. He was a businessman and media personality until December 1996, when he was elected as secretary-general of the PAC, serving under party president Stanley Mogoba. In addition, though he had not initially been elected to the National Assembly in the 1994 general election, he was sworn in during the term, filling a casual vacancy in the PAC's caucus.

Ahead of the 1999 general election, Muendane was announced as the PAC's candidate for Premier of Gauteng, though the party ultimately did not win any seats in the province. He was also ranked third on the party's national list, which should have secured him one of the three seats won by the PAC in the National Assembly. However, in the aftermath of the election, the party withdrew him from the list, replacing him with the next-ranked candidate, Patricia de Lille. Muendane said that he had not been consulted; the PAC said that he would be transferred to the party's headquarters to focus on preparing for the 2000 local elections.

In subsequent years, Muendane remained active in the PAC, and he later served as its deputy president.
