= Nkenke Kekana =

South African politician and businessman

Chairperson of the Portfolio Committee on Communications
- In office 16 August 1999 – 2003
- Preceded by: Sam Moeti
- Succeeded by: Kgaogelo Lekgoro

Member of the National Assembly
- In office 1994–2003

Personal details
- Born: Nkenke Nathaniel Kekana; 20 April 1962 (age 64)
- Citizenship: South Africa
- Party: African National Congress
- Education: University of South Africa
- Nicknames: Ned; Nat

Nkenke Nathaniel "Nat" Kekana (born 20 April 1962) is a South African politician and businessman. He is a former Member of Parliament and co-founded Business Connexion, a leading information technology firm, in 1996. He is a director and shareholder of several businesses.

Formerly an anti-apartheid activist in Alexandra, he represented the African National Congress (ANC) as a Member of the National Assembly from 1994 to 2003 and was a longstanding member of the Provincial Executive Committee of the ANC in Gauteng. He was elected to two consecutive five-year terms on the ANC National Executive Committee in 2017 and 2022 and is the committee's head of communications from 2018 to date.

== Early life and activism ==
Kekana was born on 20 April 1962. In the 1980s, he was active in anti-apartheid politics in the township of Alexandra in the Transvaal, now part of Gauteng province; he was a founding member of the South African Youth Congress in 1987 and belonged to the organisation's national executive. Later in 1987, under the prevailing state of emergency, he was arrested for his political activism and he was detained without trial until 1989; after participating in the 18 days hunger strike while detained at Johannesburg Prison. Also in the 1980s, he studied computer programming, and in later years he completed a postgraduate diploma in telecommunications policy from the University of South Africa.

== Member of Parliament: 1994–2003 ==
Kekana was elected as a Member of Parliament in South Africa's first post-apartheid elections in 1994. He was re-elected to the seat in 1999 and in August 1999 he was elected Chairperson of the National Assembly's Portfolio Committee on Communications. Ferial Haffajee labelled him "a leading light in the parliamentary caucus". He was a member of the African National Congress (ANC) and a member of the National Executive Committee of the ANC Youth League.

During the same period, Kekana launched his business career. In 1996 he launched an information technology firm, Business Connexion Solution, with twin brothers Benjamin and Isaac Mophatlane. The company merged with Comparex Africa in 2003 and was subsequently listed as Business Connexion (BCX).

== Private and public entities: 2003–present ==
Although Kekana's term in Parliament was not due to end until the 2004 general election, he announced in April 2003 that he would resign his seat in order to join Telkom, where he replaced Victor Moche as group executive for regulatory affairs and public policy. The Communications Users Association of South Africa expressed concern that, because of Kekana's political connections, his appointment would stifle competition in the telecommunications industry. He resigned from Telkom at the end of June 2005 in order to "pursue other career opportunities".

Upon leaving Telkom, Kekana established Mowana 5 Mile, a consortium formed with the Mophatlane twins and others to bid on black economic empowerment (BEE) deals. Mowana was shortlisted for a major R7.5 billion BEE transaction with Vodacom but, following a prolonged and politically charged bidding process, lost out to Thebe Investments and Royal Bafokeng Holdings in 2008.

Business Connexion remained among Kekana's most significant projects: it was subject to a failed takeover bid by Telkom in 2007 and by 2008 it was one of the largest information technology firms in South Africa, with 4,500 employees and revenues just below R4 billion. As of 2008, Kekana (still in partnership with the Mophatlane brothers) was a director and major shareholder of Galdex Holdings, which owned 25.1% of Business Connexion. Business Connexion was later bought by Telkom.

At the same time, by 2007, Kekana was Deputy Chairperson of the Gauteng Film Commission later Chairperson. His career in the broadcasting and film industry started in the 80s. He worked at the SABC as a technician and later became a producer and director of several documentaries including Ulibambe Lingashona,a 5-part series on the history of the ANC. Kekana was a long standing member of ANC Gauteng Provincial Executive Committee and was head of communication and spokesperson for the Gauteng ANC.

== ANC National Executive: 2017–present ==
Kekana left his post in the Gauteng ANC pursuant to the ANC's 54th National Conference in December 2017, when he was elected for the first time to the ANC National Executive Committee; by number of votes received, he was ranked 41st of the 80 candidates elected to the committee. He was also appointed as the head of the National Executive Committee's subcommittee on information and publicity (communications), a full-time role based out of the party's headquarters at Luthuli House in Johannesburg.

In the run-up to the ANC's 55th National Conference in December 2022, Kekana was identified as a key ally and lobbyist for Paul Mashatile, who ran successfully for election as ANC Deputy President. Sources told the Sunday Independent that Kekana's role became an obstacle to cooperation between the Mashatile campaign and the presidential campaign of Zweli Mkhize: Kekana was reportedly an associate of Mdumiseni Ntuli, who was running for the ANC Secretary-General position, but Mkhize's backers in KwaZulu-Natal preferred Phumulo Masualle to Ntuli. At the conference, Kekana was re-elected to another term on the National Executive Committee; he was ranked 57th of the 80 elected candidates by popularity, receiving the support of 1,158 (28.7%) of the 4,029 delegates who voted in the election.

== Personal life ==
Kekana is married.
