= Moosa Tiry =

South African politician

Member of the National Assembly
- In office May 1994 – June 1999

Personal details
- Citizenship: South Africa
- Party: African National Congress

Moosa Tiry is a South African politician who represented the African National Congress in the National Assembly during the first democratic Parliament from 1994 to 1999. He was elected in the 1994 general election and was a member of the Portfolio Committee on Public Enterprises and Portfolio Committee on Environmental Affairs and Tourism. He did not stand for re-election in 1999.
