= Jillian Bam =

South African politician (born 1946)

Member of the National Assembly
- In office until 1999

Personal details
- Born: 14 September 1946 (age 79)
- Citizenship: South Africa
- Party: United Democratic Movement (since 1999)
- Other political affiliations: African National Congress (until 1999)

Jillian Nomancube Bam (born 14 September 1946) is a South African politician who represented the African National Congress (ANC) in the National Assembly during the first democratic Parliament. Though not initially elected in the 1994 general election, she was sworn in to a seat during the legislative term.

Ahead of the 1999 general election, Bam stood for re-election as a candidate for two separate parties: the ANC and the opposition United Democratic Movement (UDM). Although she protested that she had not intended to defect to the UDM, she was expelled from the ANC. She was ranked 22nd on the UDM's national party list and failed to gain re-election.
