= Ntombile Mabude =

South African politician (born 1958)

Member of the National Assembly
- In office May 1994 – June 1999

Personal details
- Born: 19 December 1958 (age 67)
- Citizenship: South Africa
- Party: African National Congress

Ntombile Ivy Mabude (born 19 December 1958) is a South African politician who represented the African National Congress (ANC) in the National Assembly during the first democratic Parliament from 1994 to 1999. She was elected to her seat in the 1994 general election. She was sworn in to a seat during the legislative term. Ahead of the 1999 general election, Mabude stood for re-election, but she was ranked 168th on the ANC's national party list and failed to gain re-election.
