= Nosisa Mfono =

South African politician (born 1944)

Member of the National Assembly
- In office until 1999

Personal details
- Born: 28 May 1944 (age 81)
- Citizenship: South Africa
- Party: United Democratic Movement
- Other political affiliations: African National Congress

Nosisa Babalwa Mfono (born 28 May 1944) is a South African politician who represented the African National Congress (ANC) in the National Assembly during the first democratic Parliament. She was not initially elected in the 1994 general election but joined the legislature during the legislative term, filling a casual vacancy. She sat on the Portfolio Committee on Agriculture, Water Affairs and Forestry.

Ahead of the 1999 general election, Mfono left the ANC for the breakaway United Democratic Movement (UDM). She stood for re-election to her seat under the UDM's banner, but was ranked too low on the party list to win a seat.
