= Marius Robertsen =

South African politician (born 1953)

Delegate to the National Council of Provinces

Assembly Member for Eastern Cape
- In office April 2004 – May 2009

Member of the National Assembly
- In office 1995–1999

Personal details
- Born: Marius Oliver Robertsen; 4 March 1953 (age 73)
- Died: 16 September 2017 (aged 64)
- Citizenship: South Africa
- Party: African National Congress

Marius Oliver Robertsen (born 4 March 1953) is a South African politician from the Eastern Cape. He represented the African National Congress (ANC) in the National Assembly from 1995 to 1999 and in the National Council of Provinces from 2004 to 2009.

== Legislative career ==
Though not initially elected in the 1994 general election, Robertsen joined the National Assembly in 1995, filling a casual vacancy. In the 1999 general election, he stood for election as a candidate for the opposition New National Party (NNP), but he was ranked seventh on the NNP's party list for the Eastern Cape and did not gain a seat. In the next general election in 2004, he returned to the ANC, which elected him to one of its seats in the Eastern Cape caucus of the National Council of Provinces. He served a single term there.
