= Maureen Malumise =

South African politician

Member of the National Assembly
- In office May 1994 – May 2009

Personal details
- Born: 7 May 1934 (age 91)
- Citizenship: South Africa
- Party: African National Congress

Meisi Maureen Malumise (born 7 May 1934), also known as Maureen Madumise, is a retired South African politician who represented the African National Congress (ANC) in the National Assembly from 1994 to 2009. She was elected to the first democratic Parliament in 1994 and gained re-election in 1999 and 2004.

Malumise served the Free State constituency. During her third term in Parliament, she was the ANC's whip in the Portfolio Committee on Health.
