= Noel Williams (South African politician) =

South African politician and activist

Personal details
- Born: Noel John Williams; 1948 or 1949 (age 75–76)
- Citizenship: South Africa
- Political party: African National Congress

Noel John Williams (born 1948 or 1949) is a South African politician and former anti-apartheid activist from Cape Town. He is known for his community and labour activism in Atlantis, and he represented the African National Congress (ANC) in the National Assembly during the first democratic Parliament.

== Early life and activism ==
Born in 1948 or 1949, Williams grew up in Windermere, a Coloured location on the N1 in Cape Town. He moved to Atlantis, on the outskirts of Cape Town, in 1975, and there he rose to political prominence as a leader in anti-apartheid civic activism.

In 1985, he entered the trade union movement, becoming a shop steward for the South African Allied Workers' Union at the 3M factory in Atlantis. When the Congress of South African Trade Unions was launched in the Western Cape in January 1986, Williams was elected as regional vice-chairperson. Already detained twice for his activism in 1985, for several weeks, he was detained again in June 1986 during the prevailing state of emergency. He was held for seventeen months and later told the Truth and Reconciliation Commission that he had been deprived of food and held in solitary confinement for prolonged periods.

Upon his release, Williams was served with a banning order, but he resumed his activism. When the ANC was unbanned by the apartheid government in 1990, he was elected to the interim regional executive of the party's new Western Cape branch; he also retained his position as chairperson of the Atlantis Residents' Association.

== Post-apartheid political career ==
Williams represented the ANC in the National Assembly during the first post-apartheid Parliament. He was not initially elected in the 1994 general election but joined the assembly during the legislative term, filling a casual vacancy. He did not stand for re-election in 1999, but he remained the chairperson of the Atlantis Residents' Association for many years thereafter.
