= Munyadziwa Netshimbupfe =

South African politician and traditional leader (1951–2013)

Member of the National Assembly
- In office May 1994 – June 1999

Personal details
- Born: 8 September 1951
- Died: 17 June 2013 (aged 61) Gauteng, South Africa
- Citizenship: South Africa
- Party: African National Congress

Munyadziwa Alpheus Netshimbupfe (8 September 1951 – 17 June 2013) was a South African politician, lawyer, and Venda traditional leader. He represented the African National Congress in the National Assembly from 1994 to 1999, and he was the chief (khosi) of Tshimbupfe in Limpopo from 1991 until his death in 2013.

== Life and career ==
Netshimbupfe was born on 8 September 1951. He was a lawyer and magistrate by profession, practicing in the former Northern Transvaal. In addition, he was installed as chief (khosi) of Tshimbupfe, a lifetime appointment, on 20 December 1991. During South Africa's democratic transition, he attended the Multi-Party Negotiating Forum on constitutional reform as part of the delegation of the Transvaal Traditional Leaders group.

In the 1994 general election, South Africa's first under universal suffrage, Netshimbupfe was elected to represent the African National Congress in the new National Assembly. He served a single term in Parliament, leaving after the 1999 general election, and afterwards worked as a senior prosecutor in Mopani until 2001. He also served for a period as Deputy Chairperson of the Limpopo House of Traditional Leaders.

== Personal life and death ==
Netshimbupfe was married and had seven children. He died on 17 June 2013 at a private hospital in Gauteng, following a brief illness. His death inaugurated a dispute among his family about who would succeed him as leader of the Tshimbupfe Tribal Authority; the dispute was resolved in 2022.
