= Sipho Gcabashe =

South African politician

Member of the KwaZulu-Natal Provincial Legislature
- In office until May 2019

Provincial Secretary of the African National Congress in KwaZulu-Natal
- Incumbent
- Assumed office December 1996
- Deputy: Bheki Cele; Senzo Mchunu
- Chairperson: Jacob Zuma; S'bu Ndebele
- Preceded by: Senzo Mchunu
- Succeeded by: Senzo Mchunu

Personal details
- Citizenship: South African
- Party: African National Congress
- Spouse: Lungi Mnganga-Gcabashe (divorced)

Sipho Joseph Gcabashe is a South African politician and businessman who represented the African National Congress (ANC) in the KwaZulu-Natal Provincial Legislature until 2019, when he failed to gain re-election. He was also Provincial Secretary of the ANC's KwaZulu-Natal branch from 1996 to 2005.

== ANC Provincial Secretary: 1996–2005 ==
In December 1996, Gcabashe was elected to succeed Senzo Mchunu as ANC Provincial Secretary in KwaZulu-Natal, with Bheki Cele as his deputy. According to the Mail & Guardian, his election followed a directive from the ANC's national leadership – conveyed by Valli Moosa – that other contestants should withdraw from the race to allow Gcabashe to lead the party's provincial campaign ahead of the 1999 general election. That directive was apparently followed by Mchunu but ignored by Mchunu's former deputy, Sifiso Nkabinde, whom Gcabashe beat in a vote for the Provincial Secretary position. At the time, Gcabashe was reportedly close with Jacob Zuma, then the ANC's Provincial Chairperson.

He ultimately held the party office for three terms until May 2005, when Senzo Mchunu returned to the position. He won election to his third term narrowly: at the ANC's provincial elective conference in 2002, he tied for the position with Nathi Mthethwa at 190 votes each, and when the vote was re-run he won by a margin of three votes, receiving 235 votes to Mthetha's 232.

== Legislative career ==
Gcabashe served in the national Parliament in the 1990s and also served a long tenure in the KwaZulu-Natal Provincial Legislature, where he held a seat by May 2004. In October 2013, he was elected as the provincial legislature's Chairperson of Committees, succeeding Lydia Johnson when Johnson in turn replaced Peggy Nkonyeni as Speaker. He was elected to his last term in the provincial legislature in the 2014 general election, ranked 28th on the ANC's provincial party list. He stood for re-election in the next general election in 2019, but he was ranked 59th on the ANC's party list and did not secure a seat.

In addition to his legislative career, Gcabashe had a career in business. As of 2011, he was a director of Savula Investment Holdings, a shareholder in Cell C; the company was chaired by former parliamentarian Mpho Scott and counted Minister Siyabonga Cwele among its shareholders. He was also a shareholder – along with Scott and opposition parliamentarian Senzo Mfayela – in Dezzo Holdings, which was controversially awarded a R2.1-billion housing contract with the provincial government in 2011. At the same time, Gcabashe was a member of the Provincial Executive Committee of the ANC's KwaZulu-Natal branch, gaining re-election to his seat in 2012 and 2015.

== Personal life ==
He was formerly married to the late ANC politician Lungi Mnganga-Gcabashe; they divorced in 2004 after a period of separation.
