= Wendy Mayimele =

South African politician and diplomat

Member of the National Assembly
- In office May 1994 – June 1999

Personal details
- Citizenship: South Africa
- Party: African National Congress

Hlamalani Wendy Mayimele is a South African businesswoman, diplomat, and politician. She represented the African National Congress (ANC) in the National Assembly during the first democratic Parliament from 1994 to 1999, gaining election in the 1994 general election. A teacher by profession, she was a member of Parliament's Portfolio Committee on Trade and Industry.

After leaving Parliament in 1999, she entered the diplomatic service.
