= Vhambelani Ramabulana =

South African politician and traditional leader (died 2022)

Member of the National Assembly
- In office until June 1999

Personal details
- Born: Vhambelani Edward Ramabulana; 1929/1930
- Died: 28 July 2022 (aged 92); Ha-Maelula, Makhado; Limpopo, South Africa
- Citizenship: South Africa
- Political party: African National Congress

Vhambelani Edward Ramabulana (1929/1930 – 28 July 2022) was a South African politician and Venda traditional leader. He was the leader of the tribal authority in Ha-Maelula, a village in Makhado, Limpopo, about 30 kilometres northeast of Louis Trichardt. He was also a member of the Sinthumule tribal council.

Ramabulana represented the African National Congress (ANC) in the National Assembly during the first democratic Parliament. He was not initially elected in the 1994 general election but joined during the legislative term, filling a casual vacancy. He did not stand for re-election in 1999. He died on 28 July 2022 at his home in Maelula after a long illness.
