= Isak van Zyl =

South African politician

Personal details
- Born: Isak Dawid van Zyl; 30 August 1944 (age 81)
- Citizenship: South Africa
- Party: Afrikaner Eenheidsbeweging
- Other political affiliations: National Party

Isak Dawid van Zyl (born 30 August 1944) is a South African politician who represented the National Party in the National Assembly during the first democratic Parliament. He was elected in the 1994 general election and was a member of the Standing Committee on Public Accounts.

Van Zyl resigned from his seat near the end of the legislative term in order to defect to the new Afrikaner Eenheidsbeweging (AEB). In the 1999 general election, he stood as a candidate for the AEB, ranked second on the party's national list; however, the party won only one seat, which went to party leader Cassie Aucamp.
