= Omar Ahmed (South African politician) =

South African politician

Personal details
- Citizenship: South Africa
- Political party: African National Congress

Omar Mohamed Ahmed is a retired South African politician who represented the African National Congress (ANC) in the National Assembly during the first democratic Parliament. He was elected in the 1994 general election but resigned before the end of the legislative term. He served the Northern Province constituency (now Limpopo) and was a prominent figure in Louis Trichardt.

== Personal life ==
Ahmed's daughter, Zahida Sabadia, a medical student, was murdered by her husband, Omar Sabadia, in a fake hijacking in February 1996. The story received extensive media attention. Ahmed legally adopted Zahida's three children.
