= Mpho Scott =

South African businessman and politician (born 1965)

Member of the National Assembly
- In office 1994–2003

Personal details
- Born: Mpho Innocent Scott; 14 October 1965 (age 60)
- Citizenship: South Africa
- Party: African National Congress

Mpho Innocent Scott (born 14 October 1965) is a South African businessman and former politician who represented the African National Congress (ANC) in the National Assembly from 1994 to 2003. He chaired the Portfolio Committee on Home Affairs from 2002 until 2003, when he resigned from politics to pursue his business career.

== Parliament: 1994–2003 ==
In South Africa's first post-apartheid elections in 1994, Scott was elected to represent the ANC in the National Assembly. He served until 2003, gaining re-election in 1999 on the ANC's list for KwaZulu-Natal. He sat on the Joint Standing Committee on Intelligence and was investigated, and cleared, on allegations that he had received benefits (a car) from a state contractor in the controversial Arms Deal. From 1 May 2002, he chaired the Portfolio Committee on Home Affairs. In early 2003, he resigned from his seat in order to pursue his career in business.

== Business career ==
Scott was chairman of Savula Investment Holdings, a company formed in 1999 to acquire a 0.5 per cent stake in Cell C; politicians Sipho Gcabashe and Siyabonga Cwele were also involved in the company, Gcabashe as a director and Cwele as a shareholder. By early 2003, Scott was also chairperson of Indosa Terminal & Logistics Services and a director at Igagasi Engineering and African Legend Investments. In March of that year, African Legends Investments led a consortium of companies which concluded a black economic empowerment deal with Caltex's South African subsidiary, as a result of which Scott became a non-executive director at Caltex. In 2007, he became a non-executive director at ConvergeNet holdings.

Scott occasionally attracted media attention for doing business with the state. He was a director of Secureco Metsu, contracted to provide security to municipal properties in Durban, though he denied that his party-political connections had any bearing on the tender. Savula Investments, through Prop 5 Corporation, benefitted from state correctional services contracts, but he said he resigned from Prop 5 around the time he left Parliament. In addition, Scott, with Gcabashe and opposition politician Senzo Mfayela, was a shareholder in Dezzo Holdings, which received a controversial R2.1-billion contract to build low-cost housing outside Pietermaritzburg.

== Personal life ==
He is married to Ntombikhona Scott.
