= Margaretha Badenhorst =

South African politician

Member of the National Assembly
- In office May 1994 – June 1999

Personal details
- Citizenship: South Africa
- Party: National Party
- Education: Stellenbosch University

Margaretha Johanna Badenhorst is a South African politician who represented the National Party (NP) in the National Assembly during the first democratic Parliament from 1994 to 1999. She was elected to her seat in the 1994 general election. She holds a bachelor's degree from Stellenbosch University and was an alternate member of the parliamentary committee on environmental affairs and tourism.
