= Leon Louw (politician) =

South African politician (born 1957)

Member of the National Assembly
- In office May 1994 – June 1999

Personal details
- Born: 2 December 1957 (age 68)
- Citizenship: South Africa
- Party: Freedom Front
- Other political affiliations: Conservative Party

Leon Louw (born 2 December 1957) is a retired South African politician who represented the Freedom Front (FF) in the National Assembly from 1994 to 1999. Before that, he represented the Conservative Party (CP) in the House of Assembly,

== Life and career ==
Born on 2 December 1957, Louw represented the Welkom constituency in the House of Assembly during apartheid. He was a member of the CP. However, in March 1994, he was one of several CP representatives who signed an open letter opposing the party's boycott of the 1994 general election. Shortly afterwards, he joined the newly formed FF and was elected to represent it in the new National Assembly. During his term in the National Assembly, he was the FF's spokesperson on education.

Though Louw stood for re-election to the National Assembly in 1999, ranked fifth on the FF's national party list, he narrowly failed to gain re-election. He also stood unsuccessfully for election in 2004.
