= David Walter Marsh =

South African politician

Personal details
- Citizenship: South Africa
- Political party: African National Congress

David Walter Marsh is a South African politician who represented the African National Congress in the National Assembly during the first democratic Parliament. He was not initially elected in the 1994 general election but joined the assembly during the legislative term, filling a casual vacancy. He did not stand for re-election in 1999.
