= Richard Sizani =

South African lawyer and civil servant

Member of the National Assembly
- In office 1994–1997

Personal details
- Born: Richard Khaliphile Sizani
- Citizenship: South Africa
- Party: Pan Africanist Congress (until 1998)

Richard Khaliphile Sizani is a South African lawyer, civil servant, and former politician. He represented the Pan Africanist Congress (PAC) in the National Assembly from 1994 until 1997, when he joined the civil service. He was a member of the Public Service Commission from 2011 to 2022.

== Early life and career ==
Sizani is a lawyer by profession and lived abroad in Australia and New Zealand during apartheid. In 1992, he returned to South Africa, where he represented the PAC at the multi-party negotiations to end apartheid. During the same period, from 1992 to 1994, he was a senior lecturer in law at the University of the Transkei.

== Post-apartheid career ==
In the 1994 general election, Sizani was elected to represent the PAC in the National Assembly. He resigned from his seat in 1997 to join the civil service, first as chief director for traditional affairs in the Department of Provincial Affairs and Constitutional Government and later as director-general of the Government of KwaZulu-Natal. He left the PAC in 1998.

In September 2011, President Jacob Zuma appointed him to the Public Service Commission, initially as an ordinary member and then, from October 2014, as deputy chairperson. In December 2015, Zuma appointed him as chairperson of the commission. His term in that office ended on 31 January 2022.
