= Nomasonto Phakathi =

South African politician

Member of the National Assembly
- In office May 1994 – June 1999

Personal details
- Born: 4 February 1962 (age 64)
- Citizenship: South Africa
- Party: African National Congress

Nomasonto Emmah Phakathi (born 4 February 1962) is a South African politician who represented the African National Congress (ANC) in the National Assembly from 1994 to 1999, having gained election in the 1994 general election. As of 2021, she represented the ANC as a councillor in Thembisile Hani Local Municipality in Mpumalanga, where she was Member of the Mayoral Committee for Corporate Services. She stood for re-election to the council in the local elections later in 2021.
