= Richard Sikakane =

South African politician (1936–2021)

Member of the National Assembly
- In office May 1994 – May 2009

Personal details
- Born: Mdumiseni Richard Sikakane; 18 August 1936 Matshana Reserve, Zululand; Natal, Union of South Africa
- Died: January 2021 (aged 84)
- Party: African National Congress
- Education: Adams College

Mdumiseni Richard Sikakane (18 August 1936 – January 2021), also spelled Richard Sikhakhane, was a South African politician and stalwart of the African National Congress (ANC). He joined Umkhonto weSizwe in 1963 and was involved in its underground structures in the Greater Durban area for the next three decades. After the end of apartheid, he represented the ANC in the National Assembly for three terms from 1994 to 2009.

== Early life and activism ==
Sikakane was born on 18 August 1936 in the Matshana Reserve near Empangeni in Zululand, then part of the Natal Province. One of seven siblings, he attended primary school in Empangeni but was raised in Durban. With the financial assistance of his uncle, who was a school principal and chief of KwaMadlebe Traditional Authority, he began high school at Adams College in Amanzimtoti in 1955.

On 9 August 1956, Sikakane and his schoolmates organised a stay-away from class in solidarity with the Women's March being held that day in Pretoria by anti-apartheid organisations. He was expelled for his involvement in organising the stay-away, but his teacher, Mazisi Kunene, organised for him to stay at Glebelands in Umlazi with ANC supporters, among them Billy Khoza and Moses Mabhida. After matriculating, he got a job as a clerk at the Bantu Administration Department office at KwaMuhle, where he worked with ANC stalwart Johnny Makhathini.

In 1963, Sikakane joined the ANC's armed wing, Umkhonto weSizwe (MK), which at the time was banned by the apartheid government. He led underground MK structures in the area around Durban – including in Ntuzuma, Inanda, and parts of KwaMashu – until 1992, when, amid developments in the negotiations to end apartheid, he returned to Zululand to serve as the ANC's regional elections coordinator in the northern Natal region.

== Parliament: 1994–2009 ==
In South Africa's first post-apartheid elections in 1994, Sikakane was elected to represent the ANC in the National Assembly. He served three terms, gaining re-election in 1999 and 2004, and left after the 2009 general election. In August 2007, the ANC appointed him as a party whip in one of Parliament's portfolio committees.

== Personal life and death ==
He was married to Dorcas Sikakane and had four children. He died in late January 2021.
