= Val Viljoen =

South African politician and activist

Member of the National Assembly
- In office May 1994 – June 1999
- Constituency: Eastern Cape

Personal details
- Born: Surrey, England
- Citizenship: South Africa and Britain
- Party: African National Congress
- Other political affiliations: Black Sash

Valerie Viljoen, formerly Valerie Sullivan, is a retired British–South African politician and activist. She represented the African National Congress (ANC) in the National Assembly from 1994 to 1999 and during apartheid was a member of the Black Sash in the Eastern Cape's Border Region.

== Early life and career ==
Viljoen was born in Surrey, England to a family of Liberal Party supporters. After finishing high school, she moved to London, where she completed a secretarial course, found a secretarial job in a firm, and married an engineer. She and her husband lived in Rhodesia from 1966 to 1969 while her husband was on a work assignment. Thereafter he was transferred to a post in East London in South Africa's Cape Province.

== Apartheid-era activism ==
While living in East London, Viljoen joined the Border branch of the Black Sash after reading about its work in the Daily Dispatch. After divorcing her husband in the 1970s, she also began work at the South African Institute of Race Relations, initially as a part-time administrative secretary and later as regional secretary. She left the institute in 1984 or 1985 when it began to re-orient itself as a primarily research-based organisation, placing comparatively less emphasis on project-based activism. She continued to work for the Black Sash's advice office thereafter, and she was a motivating force for a major internal inquiry in Black Sash, known as the Viljoen Commission, which investigated the organisation's management practices across the country.

However, by the time the commission's report was published in 1993, Viljoen had left the Black Sash; after the African National Congress (ANC) and other black political organisations were unbanned by the apartheid government in 1990, she was disappointed that the Black Sash did not intend to reform itself to become less exclusively dominated by white women. She joined the ANC instead and under its banner conducted outreach in the Cape's informal settlements during the democratic transition. Ahead of the 1994 general election, she was an administrator for an ANC election office and also represented the party as an election monitor.

== Parliament: 1994–1999 ==
Viljoen stood as an ANC candidate in the 1994 election, but later said that she had not anticipated the ANC's excellent electoral performance in the Eastern Cape and had not expected to be elected. She was elected to represent the party in the National Assembly, the lower house of the South African Parliament, and served there until the next general election in 1999.

== Personal life ==
Viljoen's first husband, whom she married in England, was Colin Sullivan; they had two daughters. She had another daughter with Tony Viljoen, whom she married in East London in 1980; he was the principal of East London's Cambridge High School and a United Party supporter.
