= Tshimbupfe =

Settlement area in South Africa

- Etymology: "Iron Mountains"
- Interactive map of Tshimbupfe
- Coordinates: 23°20′33.13″S 30°29′6.99″E
- Country: South Africa
- Province: Limpopo

Area
  - Total: 16.76 km^{2} (6.47 sq mi)
- Elevation: 823.8 m (2,703 ft)

Population (2011)
  - Total: 14,653
- Time zone: UTC+2 (SAST)

Tshimbupfe is a region in South Africa's Limpopo province encompassing Tshimbupfe village and the nearby area south of the Soutpansberg mountain range.

== People ==
The area is home to members of the Vhavenda people, a Bantu-language speaking group composed of multiple subgroups with distinct origins and cultural heritage. Mining and iron smelting have long been important to the economic, commercial, and ritual lives of the Vhavenda people. Today, Tshimbupfe is in the Makhado Local Municipality within the Vhembe District Municipality; according to the 2011 South African National Census, Tshimbupfe has a population of 14,653 and an area of 16.76 km^{2}. Most residents speak Venda (also known as Tshivenda) or Xitsonga

== Geography and geology ==
The settlement area lies 823.8 m above sea level and the province is bordered by Botswana to the west and Zimbabwe to the north. The word “Tshimbupfe” translates to “Iron Mountains” in the Venda language. The settlement area sits at the foot of Manobi Mountain, part of the Schiel Alkaline Complex, a carbonatite complex. The nearby mountain is rich in iron ore (hematite), which was mined for bartering, profit, the creation of domestic utensils, and smelting until the mid-20th century. The complex is part of the Kaapvaal craton, part of Earth's original crust (3.6 - 2.5 Ga).

== Archaeological significance ==
The tradition of bloomery iron smelting in this region extends back to the Early Iron Age (AD 200–900). This long tradition is reflected in the numerous remnants of this practice that dot the landscape. The mountains of Tshimbupfe, to which Venda people would travel from the surrounding lowlands for iron ore, are lined with shallow trenches from pre-European mining that remained visible until the 1990s. The mining and transportation of this ore was documented in the late 1800s by E.D. Gieseke, the wife of a missionary based in the region

The iron smelteries used in this region were clay cylinders measuring approximately one meter in diameter and height built into the ground. Each smelter had three vertical slits at even intervals around its circumference, into which tuyères were inserted to facilitate airflow. These furnaces were reused to produce additional blooms, and the vertical slits may have allowed each bloom to be removed from the smelter without destroying it. Schuynshoogte, a farm to the north of Tshimbupfe village, was the location of an iron production center with a smelter that remained in good condition until being vandalized in the 1990s.
