= Elred Ferreira =

South African politician

Member of the National Assembly
- In office May 1994 – April 2004

Personal details
- Born: Elred Thomas Ferreira; 23 September 1962 (age 63)
- Citizenship: South Africa
- Party: Inkatha Freedom Party

Elred Thomas Ferreira (born 23 September 1962), also known as Alfred Ferreira, is a South African politician who represented the Inkatha Freedom Party (IFP) in the National Assembly from 1994 to 2004, gaining election in 1994 and 1999. During his second term, he was a member of Parliament's Portfolio Committee on Safety and Security.
