= Coetzee Bester =

South African academic and politician

Member of the National Assembly
- In office May 1994 – June 1999

Personal details
- Citizenship: South Africa
- Party: National Party
- Education: University of Pretoria (PhD)

Ben Coetzee Bester is a South African academic and former politician who represented the National Party (NP) in the National Assembly from 1994 to 1999, having gained election to his seat in the 1994 general election. Thereafter he embarked on an academic career in information science.

Bester had previously completed an undergraduate degree in anthropology, and after leaving Parliament he completed a master's degree in information science (in 1999), and a doctorate in information science from the University of Pretoria (in 2018). He subsequently served as director for the African Center of Excellence for Information Ethics at the University of Pretoria and chaired the South African chapter of UNESCO's Information for All Programme. He is Afrikaans.
