= Jan Slabbert =

South African politician (born 1933)

Member of the National Assembly
- In office May 1994 – March 2003

Personal details
- Born: 28 June 1933 (age 92) Vryheid, Natal Province; Union of South Africa
- Party: African National Congress (since 2003)
- Other political affiliations: Peace and Development Party (2003); Inkatha Freedom Party (1987–2003)

Jan Hendrik Slabbert (born 28 June 1933) is a retired South African politician who served in the National Assembly from 1994 to 2003. He joined the KwaZulu-Natal Provincial Legislature after that. He is also a former mayor of Vryheid, KwaZulu-Natal.

Slabbert entered politics through local government in Vryheid and represented the Inkatha Freedom Party (IFP) in the National Assembly from 1994 to 2003. When the party transferred him to the KwaZulu-Natal Provincial Legislature in March 2003, he resigned in protest and formed his own short-lived one-man party, the Peace and Development Party (PDP). Later in 2003, he joined the African National Congress (ANC), and he was elected to two further terms in the provincial legislature under the ANC banner.

== Early life and career ==
Slabbert was born on 28 June 1933 and is from Vryheid. He entered politics through a seventeen-year term in local government, including six years as mayor of his hometown. According to Slabbert, he joined the IFP during apartheid in 1987.

== National Assembly ==
In the 1994 general election, Slabbert was elected to represent the IFP in the National Assembly. He was re-elected in the 1999 general election. However, in early March 2003, the IFP reshuffled its legislative caucuses and instructed Slabbert to resign from the national Parliament to join the KwaZulu-Natal Legislature.

== Provincial legislature ==
In April 2003, Slabbert announced that he was resigning from the IFP to establish a new party, the PDP. He said that he was leaving because the IFP had moved him to the provincial legislature without consulting him or providing an explanation; he said that he perceived it as "nothing else but public humiliation after what I believe was an honourable and committed career in public life". Slabbert became the sole representative of the PDP, which he said would pursue non-partisan cooperation with both the IFP and its rival, the ANC. In the aftermath of his defection, News24 reported that he had moved out of his home in Vryheid, an IFP stronghold, after receiving a number of intimidating phone calls and death threats.

In October 2003, Slabbert was listed on the ANC's party list for the upcoming 2004 general election, and he announced his resignation the PDP. Standing under the ANC's banner, he was re-elected to his seat in the provincial legislature in 2004 and in 2009.
