= Esme Chait =

South African politician

Member of the National Assembly
- In office May 1994 – June 1999

Personal details
- Citizenship: South Africa
- Party: National Party

Esme Joy Chait is a South African politician who represented the National Party (NP) in Parliament from 1987 to 1999. She was first elected to the apartheid-era House of Assembly in the 1987 general election; although she lost the election to represent her constituency in the Cape, she was indirectly elected from the NP's party list. In South Africa's first post-apartheid elections in 1994, she was elected to a single term in the new National Assembly, still representing the NP. She is Jewish.
