= Sam Louw =

South African politician

Member of the National Assembly
- In office May 1994 – May 2009

Personal details
- Citizenship: South Africa
- Party: African National Congress

Samuel Kolman Louw is a South African politician who represented the African National Congress (ANC) in the National Assembly from 1994 to 2009, gaining election in 1994, 1999, and 2004. He represented the North West constituency and during his final term he served on the Portfolio Committee on Minerals and Energy.
