= Marthinus Appelgryn =

South African politician

Member of the National Assembly
- In office May 1994 – June 1999

Personal details
- Citizenship: South Africa
- Party: National Party

Marthinus Stephanus Appelgryn is a South African politician who represented the National Party in the National Assembly from 1994 to 1999. He was elected to his seat in the 1994 general election.
