= Qalas Kgauwe =

South African politician

Member of the National Assembly
- In office May 1994 – April 2004
- Constituency: North West

Personal details
- Born: 10 August 1955 (age 70)
- Citizenship: South Africa
- Party: African National Congress

Qalas Josias Kgauwe (born 10 August 1955) is a South African politician who represented the African National Congress (ANC) in the National Assembly from 1994 to 2004, gaining election in 1994 and 1999. He represented the North West constituency and served on the Portfolio Committee on Safety and Security during his second term. Although he left Parliament after the 2004 general election, he stood unsuccessfully for election to the North West Provincial Legislature in 2014.
