= Thembeka Gamndana =

South African politician and traditional healer

Member of Parliament
- In office May 1994 – June 1999

Personal details
- Citizenship: South Africa
- Party: African National Congress

Thembeka Gamndana is a South African politician, traditional healer, and civil servant who represented the African National Congress (ANC) in Parliament from 1994 until 1999. In the 1994 general election, she was elected to the Senate, serving the Eastern Transvaal constituency; during the legislative term that followed, she was transferred to the National Assembly.

After leaving Parliament, Gamndana worked as a traditional healer and an employee of the provincial Department of Health in Mpumalanga. In 2003, she told City Press that she had fled Mpumalanga and was in hiding in Gauteng; she claimed that she had been kidnapped and that her ANC colleagues in Mpumalanga were using witchcraft against her.
