= Mighty Mgidi =

South African politician and civil servant (born 1954)

Member of the National Assembly
- In office 9 May 1994 – 2 July 2001
- Constituency: Mpumalanga

Personal details
- Born: Jacob Simon Mgidi; 28 November 1954 (age 71)
- Citizenship: South Africa
- Party: African National Congress

Jacob Simon "Mighty" Mgidi (born 28 November 1954) is a South African politician and civil servant. He represented the African National Congress (ANC) in the National Assembly from 1994 to 2001, gaining election in 1994 and 1999. He left the assembly on 2 July 2001 in order to join the Mpumalanga Provincial Legislature, swopping seats with provincial legislator David Mabuza.

During apartheid, Mgidi was a politician in the KwaNdebele bantustan, where he was a member of the ruling party, James Mahlangu's Intando ye Sizwe. After leaving Parliament, he became a civil servant in the provincial government of Mpumalanga.
