= Dingaan Zitha =

South African politician

Member of the National Assembly
- In office May 1994 – June 1999

Personal details
- Born: Dingaan Amos Zitha
- Citizenship: South Africa
- Party: African National Congress

Dingaan Amos Zitha is a South African politician who represented the African National Congress in the National Assembly from 1994 to 1999. He was elected in the 1994 general election and did not stand for re-election in 1999. During apartheid, he served in the government of the Gazankulu bantustan, and he was a delegate to the Convention for a Democratic South Africa.
