= David Chuenyane =

South African politician

Member of the National Assembly
- In office 1994–1999
- Constituency: Gauteng

Personal details
- Born: Lerate David Chuenyane
- Citizenship: South Africa
- Party: African National Congress (since 1999)
- Other political affiliations: National Party; Pan Africanist Congress

Lerate David Chuenyane is a retired South African politician who represented the National Party (NP) in the National Assembly from 1994 to 1999. A former member of the Pan Africanist Congress (PAC), he went into exile in 1964 to join the militant Azanian People's Liberation Army (APLA) but joined the NP upon his return in 1992. He defected to the African National Congress (ANC) in 1999.

== Life and career ==
Chuenyane joined the anti-apartheid PAC in 1960 at age 18. In 1964, he went into exile in Tanzania, where he joined APLA and received five years of military training from Chinese instructors. Thereafter he moved to Canada and then the United States, where he completed his undergraduate and a master's degree and became an electrical engineer. He returned to South Africa in July 1992 during the post-apartheid transition.

Although Chuenyane had remained in contact with the PAC, he joined the NP shortly after his return to South Africa. He said that his decision was based both on policy concerns – in his words, "I turned capitalist" – and on the NP's superior infrastructure, financial resources, and experience in government. He played a prominent role in the NP's campaign ahead of the 1994 general election: he was a member of the party's national management committee, the vice chairperson of its regional branch in Johannesburg and Soweto, and one of its two top-ranked black candidates.

In the 1994 election, Chuenyane was elected to an NP seat in the National Assembly, representing the Gauteng constituency. In March 1999, he announced that he was resigning from the NP to join the governing ANC.
