= Mavhuthu Davhana =

South African politician and Venda traditional leader (1928–1999)

Member of the National Assembly
- In office 1994–1999

Personal details
- Born: Mavhuthu Kingi David Davhana; 7 August 1928
- Died: 19 April 1999 (aged 70)
- Citizenship: South Africa
- Party: African National Congress

Mavhuthu Kingi David Davhana (7 August 1928 – 19 April 1999) was a South African politician and Venda traditional leader. He was elected to represent the African National Congress in the National Assembly in the 1994 general election, but he died shortly before the end of the legislative term.

One of his children is Mashudu Davhana-Maselesele, an academic who was the first woman to be appointed as rector of North West University's Mahikeng campus.
