= Sekhopi Malebo =

South African politician (born 1960)

Member of the Free State Executive Council for Public Works, Roads and Transport
- In office 1997–2004
- Premier: Ivy Matsepe-Casaburri; Winkie Direko
- Succeeded by: Seiso Mohai

Member of the Free State Provincial Legislature
- In office December 1996 – 2004

Member of the National Assembly
- In office 1994 – December 1996

Personal details
- Born: Sekhopi Molisaotsile Andrew Malebo; 5 April 1960 (age 66)
- Citizenship: South Africa
- Party: African National Congress

Sekhopi Molisaotsile Andrew Malebo (born 5 April 1960) is a South African politician and former anti-apartheid activist from the Free State. He was the Free State's Member of the Executive Council (MEC) for Public Works, Roads and Transport from 1997 to 2004. Before that, he represented the African National Congress (ANC) in the National Assembly from 1994 to 1996.

== Early life and activism ==
Malebo was born on 5 April 1960 and is Tswana-speaking. He became politically active as a high school student in Bloemfontein in the aftermath of the 1976 Soweto uprising, particularly through the Bloemfontein Student League, which at the time was heavily influenced by Black Consciousness. He later said that he converted from Black Consciousness ideology to the Charterist tradition around 1979, when he was first exposed to the illegal Freedom Charter, which he greatly admired.

He subsequently became involved in Charterist civic associations in Bloemfontein, as well as in political organising through the Lutheran Church, and he made contact with the ANC during a visit to Sweden in 1981. In later years, he was president of the youth desk of the South African Council of Churches, to which his church was affiliated; he also held leadership positions in the Mangaung Civic Association.

After the ANC was unbanned in 1990 during the negotiations to end apartheid, Malebo formally joined the organisation and became a member of its interim leadership corps in the Orange Free State. In November 1991, he was elected as chairperson of the ANC's regional branch in the Southern Orange Free State.

== Legislative career: 1994–2004 ==
Malebo was elected to an ANC seat in the National Assembly in South Africa's first post-apartheid elections in 1994. In 1996, he left his seat to join the Free State Provincial Legislature, where he was sworn in on 18 December. He was also appointed as MEC for Public Works, Roads and Transport in Premier Ivy Matsepe-Casaburri's Executive Council. He was elected to a full term in the provincial legislature in the 1999 general election and was retained as MEC by Matsepe-Casaburri's successor, Premier Winkie Direko.

In the 2004 general election, the ANC nominated Malebo to return to the National Assembly, but he was ranked 14th on the regional party list for the Free State and narrowly failed to gain re-election. He was succeeded as MEC by Seiso Mohai.

== Later career ==
After leaving legislative politics in 2004, Malebo pursued a business career. In 2020, he co-organised a march on ANC headquarters at Luthuli House, demanding the dismissal of Ace Magashule and "other delinquents that have been involved in corruption in the province [the Free State] during [Magashule's] tenure as premier".
