= William Duna =

South African politician (died 2016)

Member of the National Assembly
- In office May 1994 – June 1999

Personal details
- Born: 1949/1950
- Died: 7 May 2016 (aged 66) Centane, Eastern Cape; South Africa
- Citizenship: South Africa
- Party: United Congress (since 2013)
- Other political affiliations: Congress of the People (2008–2013); African National Congress (until 2008)

Mabone William Duna (died 7 May 2016) was a South African politician and former anti-apartheid activist who represented the African National Congress (ANC) in the National Assembly from 1994 to 1999. He later served as Mayor of the Eastern Cape's Mnquma Local Municipality from 2007 until 2008, when he defected from the ANC to the Congress of the People (COPE). He subsequently joined the United Congress.

== Early life and activism ==
Duna was born in 1949 or 1950. During apartheid, he was a political prisoner on Robben Island between 1981 and 1987. After the ANC was unbanned inside South Africa in 1990, he was involved in re-establishing the party's structures in the former Transkei.

== Post-apartheid political career ==
In the 1994 general election, South Africa's first under universal suffrage, he was elected to ANC seat in the National Assembly, the lower house of the South African Parliament. He left Parliament after the 1999 general election.

He subsequently represented the ANC as a local councillor in Mnquma Local Municipality in the Eastern Cape from 2000 to 2008, gaining election in 2000 and 2006. He was elected as Mayor of Mnquma in late 2007, but he resigned from the council and from the ANC in 2008 in order to join COPE, a newly founded breakaway. He subsequently represented COPE as a councillor in the Amathole District Municipality, where he led the party's caucus.

In 2013, he defected to the United Congress, a breakaway from COPE. In the 2014 general election, he was ranked third on the congress's national party list for election to the National Assembly, but the party did not win any seats.

== Personal life and death ==
He died on 7 May 2016, aged 66. He and a passenger, his neighbour, drowned after his vehicle was swept off a bridge over the flooded Nxaxho River in Centane, Eastern Cape. He was married and had six children.
