= Selby Ripinga =

South African politician (born 1948)

Member of the National Assembly
- In office May 1994 – April 2004

Personal details
- Born: Selby Simeon Ripinga; 16 September 1948 (age 77)
- Citizenship: South Africa
- Party: African National Congress

Selby Simeon Ripinga (born 16 September 1948) is a South African politician and diplomat. Formerly a high-level politician in the bantustan of KaNgwane, he represented the African National Congress (ANC) in the National Assembly from 1994 to 2004. He was elected in 1994 and 1999. He later served as South African High Commissioner to Singapore.
