= Stephen Phohlela =

South African politician (born 1944)

Member of the National Assembly
- In office 9 May 1994 – April 2004
- Constituency: Free State

Personal details
- Born: Stephen Pule Phohlela; 20 October 1944 (age 81)
- Citizenship: South Africa
- Party: African National Congress
- Other political affiliations: Thebe-e-Ntsho; Dikwankwetla Party

Stephen Pule Phohlela (born 20 October 1944) is a South African politician. Formerly a politician in Qwaqwa and the founder of Thebe-e-Ntsho, he represented the African National Congress (ANC) in the National Assembly for two terms from 1994 to 2004.

== Thebe-e-Ntsho ==
During apartheid, Phohlela was an influential politician in Qwaqwa, the bantustan designated for Sesotho speakers. He was a member of the governing Dikwankwetla Party until 1987, when Chief Minister Kenneth Mopeli fired him from the government. The following year, Phohlela launched an opposition party, Thebe-e-Ntsho, which stood primarily on a platform of opposing the tribalism of Mopeli's government. This extended to opposing Mopeli's plan to incorporate the squatter camp of Botshabelo into Qwaqwa, which it argued would lead to the domination of other residents by the Bakwena clan (Dikwankwetla's primary base). Phohlela, himself from the Bataung clan, said in 1989:

There are no fewer than twenty-one clan groupings among the Basotho, but only two of these are represented by the Qwaqwa government, the Bakwena and the Batlokwa clans. What about the rest of the people, such as the Bataung, the Bakholokhoe, the Baphuthing, the Basia, and many other? Are they not classified as South Sotho? Are they not entitled to be represented inside Qwaqwa? Can they not have their own land, their own voice, and their own tribal authorities? It is the aim of Thebe-e-Ntsho to represent these forgotten Basotho people, the resistors of Apartheid.

Around 1989, Thebe-e-Ntsho – formerly a primarily rural party – increasingly organised its opposition in cooperation with youth, student, and labour groups, some of them Congress-aligned. It also launched attacks on the corruption and maladministration of the Dikwankwetla Party government. This culminated in unprecedented strikes and protests in Qwaqwa after February 1990. However, Thebe-e-Ntsho was disbanded around 1993, and Phohlela joined the ANC.

== Parliament ==
Phohlela was elected to an ANC seat in the National Assembly in the 1994 general election and gained re-election in 1999. He served the Free State constituency and was a member of the Portfolio Committee on Water Affairs during his second term.
