= Jeanette Vilakazi =

South African politician

Delegate to the National Council of Provinces

Assembly Member for KwaZulu-Natal
- In office June 1999 – May 2009

Member of the National Assembly
- In office May 1994 – June 1999

Personal details
- Citizenship: South Africa
- Party: Inkatha Freedom Party

Jeanette Vilakazi is a South African politician who represented the Inkatha Freedom Party (IFP) in Parliament. She sat in the National Assembly from 1994 to 1999, having gained election in the 1994 general election, and subsequently served the KwaZulu-Natal constituency in the National Council of Provinces from 1999 to 2009.

== Committee memberships ==
As a delegate to the NCOP, in 1999 to 2000, Vilakazi was a member of the ad hoc committee established to process South Africa's landmark Promotion of Equality and Prevention of Unfair Discrimination Act, commonly known as the Equality Act. In that capacity, she was a strong supporter of including provisions to prohibit discrimination on the basis of age, but was sceptical about the import of heterosexism. In November 1999, IOL reported that committee chair Mohseen Moosa had intervened to prevent Vilakazi from questioning a representative of the National Coalition for Gay and Lesbian Equality about "what gay is"; saying that she could not "comprehend fully" the concept, she reportedly asked the representative to "define it, have pictures even, you know, how you do sex and all those things". In later years, Vilakazi was an outspoken opponent of the Civil Union Act, which she argued was "at odds with the wishes of a majority of South Africans" and would "lead to the disintegration of family life and will encourage abnormal sexual behaviour".

While in the NCOP, Vilakazi was also a member of Parliament's Joint Rules Committee and made national headlines in 2003 for defending MPs who were filmed falling asleep during parliamentary debates.
