= Roy Mbongwe =

South African politician (1925–2002)

Member of the National Assembly
- In office May 1994 – June 1999

Personal details
- Born: Registone Roy Mbongwe; 24 April 1925
- Died: 2 September 2002 (aged 77)
- Citizenship: South Africa
- Party: Inkatha Freedom Party

Registone Roy Mbongwe (24 April 1925 – 2 September 2002) is a retired South African politician who represented the Inkatha Freedom Party (IFP) in the National Assembly from 1994 to 1999. He was elected in the 1994 general election and did not stand for re-election in 1999.

== KwaZulu ==
During apartheid, Mbongwe represented the Umbumbulu constituency in the KwaZulu Legislative Assembly. In that capacity, he was involved in the political violence between Zulu and Pondo residents in 1985–1986. On 23 January 1986, some 500 Pondos staged an attack on Mbongwe's home and business, but were reportedly driven away after Mbongwe's son opened fire with a shotgun. After another 1,000 Zulus arrived at the scene, the violence escalated, culminating in over 500 arrests, an estimated 45 deaths, and over 4,000 shacks razed in KwaMakhutha.

According to the South African Institute of Race Relations, the attack on Mbongwe's home came three days after he hosted a gathering of Zulus at a hall he owned, where the group allegedly discussed avenging the deaths of Zulus killed on Christmas Eve in 1985; Mbongwe denied involvement in that meeting.
