= Lalita Singh =

South African politician

Member of the National Assembly
- In office May 1994 – June 1999

Personal details
- Born: 10 January 1965 (age 61)
- Citizenship: South Africa
- Party: Inkatha Freedom Party

Lalita Singh (born 10 January 1965) is a South African politician from KwaZulu-Natal. She represented the Inkatha Freedom Party (IFP) in the National Assembly from 1994 to 1999. She was elected in the 1994 general election and served on the Portfolio Committee on Public Service and Administration.

Though Singh stood for re-election in 1999, she was ranked 18th on the IFP's regional party list for KwaZulu-Natal and therefore failed to gain re-election. However, she remained active in the IFP Women's Brigade in KwaDukuza, KwaZulu-Natal; in that capacity, in February 2001, she called for the state to charge with murder and castrate all HIV-positive child rapists.
