= Mietha Coetzee-Kasper =

South African politician

Member of the National Assembly
- In office May 1994 – April 2004
- Constituency: Free State

Personal details
- Born: 12 February 1953 (age 73)
- Citizenship: South Africa
- Party: African National Congress

Mietha Patricia Coetzee-Kasper (born 12 February 1953), also known as Patricia Coetsee, is a South African politician who represented the African National Congress (ANC) in the National Assembly from 1994 to 2004. She served the Free State constituency.

== Legislative career ==
Coetzee-Kasper was born on 12 February 1953. In South Africa's first post-apartheid elections in 1994, she was elected to represent the ANC in the National Assembly, the lower house of the new South African Parliament. She was elected to a second term in 1999 and served the Free State constituency, manning the ANC's constituency office in Meloding.

In 2006, after she had left Parliament, Coetzee-Kasper was questioned in a liquidation inquiry arising from the Travelgate scandal, which concerned the abuse of parliamentary travel vouchers by MPs. Liquidators alleged that Coetzee-Kasper's travel vouchers had been used to pay for air tickets worth R70,940; Parliament had apparently paid for the tickets but they had not been used and had been refunded to the travel agency. Coetzee-Kasper said that she did not know what had happened to the money involved.
