= Dan Makhanya =

South African politician and businessman

Member of the National Assembly
- In office From May 1994

Personal details
- Born: Dan Wellington Makhanya
- Citizenship: South Africa
- Political party: National Party

Dan Wellington Makhanya was a South African businessman and politician who represented the National Party (NP) in the National Assembly from 1994 until his death.

== Life and career ==
Makhanya was black and a businessman by profession. He joined the NP in 1991 during the democratic transition and subsequently was appointed to the party's Amanzimtoti constituency council. In 1993, he was appointed to the executive committee of the party's Natal branch.

In the 1994 general election, he was elected to an NP seat in the National Assembly, but he died while in office.
