= Melt Hamman =

South African politician

Member of the National Assembly
- In office May 1994 – June 1999

Personal details
- Citizenship: South Africa
- Party: National Party

Melt van Schoor Hamman is a South African politician who represented the National Party (NP) in the National Assembly from 1994 to 1999, having gained election in the 1994 general election. During the election, he was the NP's campaigns strategist for the Cape, and he formerly represented the NP in the apartheid-era House of Assembly.
