= Gilbert Ligege =

South African politician and Venda traditional leader (1932–2004)

Member of the National Assembly
- In office 1994–1999

Personal details
- Born: Mbengeni Gilbert Ligege; 24 June 1932
- Died: 2004 (aged 71–72)
- Citizenship: South Africa
- Party: African National Congress
- Other political affiliations: Venda Independence People's Party

Mbengeni Gilbert Ligege (24 June 1932 – 2004) was a South African politician and Venda traditional leader. Ho represented the African National Congress (ANC) in the National Assembly for a single term from 1994 to 1999. Before that, he was active in apartheid-era opposition politics in Venda.

== Life and career ==
Born on 24 June 1932, Ligege completed his matric and became politically active in his 30s. He was a leading figure in the Venda Independence People's Party, the main opposition party in the Venda bantustan. He was a delegate to the negotiations to end apartheid and joined the ANC in the run-up to the 1994 general election, in which he was elected to an ANC seat in the National Assembly.

Ligege died in 2004. His chieftaincy in Duthuni was inherited first by his son, Tshitondovhe Ligege, and then, in 2007, by his firstborn, Ndwamato Ligege.
