= George Mohlamonyane =

South African politician

Member of the National Assembly
- In office 1994–1999

Personal details
- Born: George Mokope Mohlamonyane
- Citizenship: South Africa
- Party: African National Congress

George Mokope Mohlamonyane is a retired South African politician who represented the African National Congress in the National Assembly for a single term from 1994 to 1999. He was elected in the 1994 general election and served on the Portfolio Committee on Communications and Portfolio Committee on Public Enterprises.

After leaving Parliament, Mohlamonyane was a spokesman for the provincial government of Mpumalanga.
