= Prince Madikizela =

South African politician and lawyer

Member of the National Assembly
- In office January 1995 – June 1999

Personal details
- Died: 11 September 2021
- Citizenship: South Africa
- Party: African National Congress
- Spouse: Camagwini Matanzima
- Relations: Winnie Madikizela-Mandela; Kaiser Matanzima (father-in-law)

Prince Madikizela (died 11 September 2021) was a South African lawyer and politician who represented the African National Congress (ANC) in the National Assembly from 1995 to 1999. He joined the assembly in January 1995, filling a casual vacancy.

A cousin of Winnie Madikizela-Mandela, Madikizela was a longtime member of the ANC underground in the Transkei during apartheid. He was also a practicing lawyer, based in Umtata, and often represented anti-apartheid activists in political cases. His political activity was initially shielded from state attention due to his marriage to Camagwini Matanzima, a favoured daughter of Transkei leader Kaiser Matanzima. After the couple separated in the early 1980s, Kaiser Matanzima banished Madikizela in October 1984; he was confined to a remote rural village until Stella Sigcau came to power in the Transkei and permitted his return to Umtata.

Madikizela died on 11 September 2021 in hospital in East London after a short illness.
