= Alwyn Goosen =

South African politician (born 1944)

Member of the National Assembly
- In office May 1994 – April 2004
- Constituency: Eastern Cape

Personal details
- Born: Alwyn Dennis Goosen; 18 June 1944 (age 81)
- Citizenship: South Africa
- Party: African National Congress
- Other political affiliations: Labour Party

Alwyn Dennis Goosen (born 18 June 1944) is a retired South African politician. He represented the Labour Party in the apartheid-era House of Representatives. In South Africa's first post-apartheid elections in 1994, he was elected to represent the African National Congress (ANC) in the new National Assembly; he served two terms, narrowly gaining re-election in 1999, and represented the Eastern Cape constituency.
