= Ahmed Ally =

South African politician

Member of the National Assembly
- In office May 1994 – June 1999

Personal details
- Born: 14 January 1942 (age 84)
- Citizenship: South Africa
- Party: Inkatha Freedom Party

Ahmed Ally (born 14 January 1942) is a retired South African politician who represented the Inkatha Freedom Party (IFP) in the National Assembly from 1994 to 1999. He was elected in the 1994 general election, and though he stood for re-election in 1999, he was ranked 17th on the IFP's regional party list for KwaZulu-Natal and therefore narrowly failed to gain re-election.
