= Lindiwe Mbuyazi =

South African politician (born 1948)

Member of the National Assembly
- In office May 1994 – April 2004
- Constituency: KwaZulu-Natal

Personal details
- Born: 21 December 1948 (age 77)
- Citizenship: South Africa
- Party: Inkatha Freedom Party

Lindiwe Rosebud Mbuyazi (born 21 December 1948) is a South African politician who represented the Inkatha Freedom Party (IFP) coming from the education department as a school teacher, principal and National teachers Union Activist(NATU).She was also a party Whip in the National Assembly from 1994 to 2004, serving the KwaZulu-Natal constituency. After that, she was a member of the KwaZulu-Natal Provincial Legislature 2004-2009.

== Political career ==
Born on 21 December 1948, Mbuyazi was a member of Inkatha (later restyled as the IFP) in the KwaZulu bantustan during apartheid. She was elected to the National Assembly in South Africa's first post-apartheid elections in 1994. She served two consecutive terms, winning re-election in the 1999 general election, and served the KwaZulu-Natal constituency. In the 2004 general election, she was elected to an IFP seat in the KwaZulu-Natal Provincial Legislature.

== Truth and Reconciliation Commission ==
The final report of the Truth and Reconciliation Commission found that Mbuyazi was responsible for gross human rights violations during apartheid. The finding stemmed from her alleged involvement in the management of an IFP-aligned hit squad, based in Esikhawini, during a period of political violence between the IFP and the rival African National Congress. Her possible involvement had been made public before the commission began, as result both of court testimony and of a 1994 law enforcement investigation. The investigation's final report had recommended that Mbuyazi and seven other IFP leaders should be prosecuted for having "utilised their position in the [KwaZulu] government and police, the very institutions which were meant to uphold law and order, to facilitate a murderous hit-squad network". However, the attorney-general had declined to prosecute the case.

At Truth and Reconciliation Commission hearings in 1997, Mbuyazi and some other IFP politicians were again personally implicated, including by former members of the hit squad. One member said that he had been taken to meet with Mbuyazi at an early stage of his recruitment to the squad, while another said that the assassination of a Congress of South African Trade Unions member had been planned at Mbuyazi's home. The commission's final report concluded that the hit squad had reported to Mbuyazi and three other local IFP leaders.
