= Nokwethemba Biyela =

South African politician (born 1954)

Member of the National Assembly
- In office until June 1999

Personal details
- Born: 15 October 1954 (age 71)
- Citizenship: South Africa
- Party: United Democratic Movement
- Other political affiliations: African National Congress (until 1999)

Nokwethemba Thelisile Biyela (born 15 October 1954) is a South African politician who represented the African National Congress (ANC) in the National Assembly during the first post-apartheid Parliament. Though she was not initially elected in the 1994 election, she was sworn in during the legislative term. At that time she was secretary of the ANC Women's League in Northern Natal.

Ahead of the 1999 general election, Biyela joined the breakaway United Democratic Movement (UDM) and stood unsuccessfully for re-election, in the KwaZulu-Natal constituency, under its banner. She remained a member of the UDM thereafter; most recently, in the 2014 general election, she was ranked first on the party's list for KwaZulu-Natal, but again did not secure election.
