= Malcolm Dyani =

South African politician (born 1945)

Member of the National Assembly
- In office May 1994 – April 2004

Personal details
- Born: Malcolm Mbonisi Zamekile Dyani; 14 February 1945 (age 81)
- Citizenship: South Africa
- Party: African National Congress (since 1999)
- Other political affiliations: Pan Africanist Congress (until 1999)

Malcolm Mbonisi Zamekile Dyani (born 14 February 1945) is a retired South African politician and former anti-apartheid activist. He served in the National Assembly from 1994 to 2004, excepting a brief hiatus in 1999. A longstanding member of the Pan Africanist Congress (PAC), he defected to the African National Congress (ANC) in 1999.

== Early life and activism ==
Dyani was born on 14 February 1945 and grew up in Duncan Village in the former Cape Province. He was a student organiser for the PAC, which was banned by the apartheid government in 1960, and he was incarcerated on Robben Island from 1963 to 1978 for his activism. After his release, in the 1980s, he was involved in a campaign to reassert the PAC's presence in the present-day Eastern Cape region, working with Benny Alexander and others on political education initiatives.

== Legislative career ==
In the 1994 general election, Dyani was elected to a PAC seat in the National Assembly. He served in the seat until early April 1999, when, in the run-up to that year's general election, he resigned from the PAC to join the ANC. He accused the PAC of acting like the Democratic Party. When the election was held in June 1999, he was elected to a second term in the National Assembly under the ANC's banner.
