= Mtutuzeli Mpehle =

South African politician and diplomat (1927–2009)

Member of the National Assembly
- In office 1995 – 1 April 2001

Personal details
- Born: Mtutuzeli Mpehle; 25 July 1927
- Died: 4 October 2009 (aged 82) Eastern Cape, South Africa
- Citizenship: South Africa
- Party: African National Congress
- Nickname: Ginyizembe

Mtutuzeli "Ginyizembe" Mpehle (25 July 1927 – 4 October 2009) was a South African politician and diplomat. He represented the African National Congress (ANC) in the National Assembly from 1995 to 2001 and then served as South African Ambassador to Morocco from 2001 to 2006. A teacher by profession, he was formerly active in the anti-apartheid movement and lived in exile with the ANC from 1962 to 1993.

== Life and career ==
Born on 25 July 1927, Mpehle was a teacher by profession. He left South Africa in 1962 to join the ANC in exile. In Ghana until 1965 and then in Zambia, Mpehle was involved in the political education of young ANC recruits in Umkhonto we Sizwe camps. He was later the ANC's chief representative in Zimbabwe and India.

In 1993, at an advanced stage of the negotiations to end apartheid, Mpehle returned to South Africa. He worked in the Department of Foreign Affairs, including as director for North Africa, until 1995, when he was sworn in to an ANC seat in the National Assembly. He was elected to a full term in the seat in the 1999 general election, representing the Eastern Cape constituency, but he resigned on 1 April 2001, ceding his seat to Manie Schoeman. After that, from 2001 to 2006, he was South African Ambassador to Morocco.

== Personal life and death ==
He was married to Joy Mpehle. He died on 4 October 2009 in the Eastern Cape.
