= Tenda Ratshitanga =

South African poet and politician (1940–2010)

- Born: Tendamudzimu Robert Ratshitanga; 1940; Mulenzhe, Northern Transvaal; Union of South Africa
- Died: September 2010 (aged 70); Thohoyandou, Limpopo
- Political party: African National Congress
- Relatives: Rashaka Ratshitanga (brother)

Tendamudzimu Robert Ratshitanga (1940 – September 2010) was a South African activist, politician and writer, best known for his poetry in Tshivenda. Formerly an anti-apartheid activist in the Venda bantustan, he represented the African National Congress (ANC) in the National Assembly for a brief period after 1994 before joining the civil service. He was a local councillor in Vhembe when he died in 2010.

== Early life and political career ==
Ratshitanga was born in 1940 in Mulenzhe in the former Transvaal and was the son of a Venda chief. With his elder brother Rashaka Ratshitanga, he was involved in anti-apartheid activism in the bantustan of Venda.

He was arrested in early November 1983 and in March 1984 was convicted under the Terrorism Act for having assisted three anti-apartheid activists to evade arrest. He was apparently offered a plea on a treason charge, which would have carried a lighter sentence, but argued that Venda did not exist as a state against which one could commit treason. He served five years' imprisonment.

According to Collins Chabane, Ratshitanga was a leading figure in establishing ANC branches in the Northern Transvaal after the ANC was unbanned in 1990. After the democratic transition, Ratshitanga served briefly in the National Assembly; he was not initially elected in the 1994 general election, but he was sworn in during the legislative term that followed, filling a casual vacancy. He went on to work in the civil service, including as provincial head of the National Intelligence Agency in Limpopo, and as a local councillor in Thulamela Local Municipality and Vhembe District Municipality. At the time of his death, he represented the ANC as the chief whip in the Vhembe council.

== Literary career ==
Ratshitanga published his first book of poetry, Vhungoho na Vivho (Tshivenda for Truthfulness and Jealousy) in 1972, and several others afterwards, including an anthology, Tell Him, Mother, in 1976. Several of his poems were prescribed works in classes at public schools and the University of Venda from the 1980s onwards. He also launched a newspaper, The Bugle, during apartheid.

== Personal life and death ==
He was married to Christinah Ratshitanga and died in September 2010 at Tshilidzini Hospital after a short illness. President Jacob Zuma granted him an official provincial state funeral, and Minister Collins Chabane and Limpopo Premier Cassel Mathale provided eulogies.
