= Kierin O'Malley =

South African politician and academic (born 1963)

Member of the National Assembly
- In office 1996–1999

Personal details
- Born: Patrick Kierin Robert O'Malley; 12 March 1963 (age 63)
- Citizenship: South Africa
- Party: Federal Alliance (since 1999)
- Other political affiliations: Inkatha Freedom Party (until 1999)
- Education: Stellenbosch University; University of Cape Town

Patrick Kierin Robert O'Malley (born 12 March 1963) is a South African lawyer, academic, and politician who represented the Inkatha Freedom Party (IFP) in the National Assembly from 1996 to 1999. He defected to the Federal Alliance in early 1999.

== Life and career ==
Born on 12 March 1963, O'Malley completed an LLB at the University of Stellenbosch in 1985 and an Honours degree in politics from the University of Cape Town in 1986. After a stint as an articled clerk in Cape Town, he joined the department of political science at the University of South Africa. According to the IFP, he joined the party shortly before the 1994 general election and was employed as an IFP researcher for the next two years.

In 1996, O'Malley was sworn in to the National Assembly, filling a casual vacancy in the IFP caucus. In early 1999, he resigned from the IFP and therefore from his parliamentary seat because of his opposition to the IFP's increasingly accommodating stance towards the governing African National Congress. In his response to media reports about O'Malley's resignation, IFP leader Mangosuthu Buthelezi said:

...this is a political non-event. Advocate O'Malley was by all accounts the most junior member of our parliamentary delegation... Therefore, it is preposterous that some newspapers styled him as a 'senior member' of our parliamentary delegation. It is not true that he any significant role in the shaping of our policies, all of which predated his joining our Party.

After leaving the IFP, O'Malley joined the Federal Alliance, which nominated him to stand for election to the Western Cape Provincial Legislature in the 1999 general election. He was not elected.
