= Ntsiki Mashimbye =

South African diplomat and politician

Member of the National Assembly
- In office May 1994 – April 2004

Personal details
- Born: 9 April 1969 (age 57)
- Citizenship: South Africa
- Party: African National Congress

Joseph Ntshikiwane Mashimbye (born 9 April 1969) is a South African diplomat and former politician. He represented the African National Congress (ANC) in the National Assembly from 1994 to 2004. Since leaving Parliament, he has served as South African Ambassador to the Democratic Republic of Congo, Brazil, and Egypt.

== Early life and activism ==
Mashimbye was born on 9 April 1969. He was active in the anti-apartheid movement and in 1997 was among a large number of ANC members who approached the Truth and Reconciliation Commission with a collective application for amnesty for their involvement in ANC policy decisions that had resulted in human rights violations. The application was denied because it was too broad for the amnesty rules to be applicable.

== Career in government ==
He was elected to the National Assembly in the 1994 general election, South Africa's first post-apartheid elections. He served two terms, gaining re-election in 1999. During his second term, he succeeded Tony Yengeni as chairman of Parliament's Joint Standing Committee on Defence, which at the time was embroiled in controversy over the 1999 Arms Deal.

After leaving Parliament, he entered the diplomatic service. Since then, he has served as South African Ambassador to the Democratic Republic of Congo, as Ambassador to Brazil, and, since 2021, as Ambassador to Egypt.
