= Windvoel Mahlangu =

South African politician

Member of the National Assembly
- In office until April 2009
- Constituency: North West

Personal details
- Citizenship: South Africa
- Political party: African National Congress

Windvoel Mlomabo Mahlangu, known until 2013 as Windvoel Mlomabo Skhosana, is a South African politician who represented the African National Congress (ANC) in the National Assembly until 2009, serving the North West province.

== Legislative career ==
Mahlangu was not initially elected in the 1994 general election but was sworn into the National Assembly during the legislative term that followed, filling a casual vacancy arising. He was elected to full terms in the assembly in 1999 and 2004. He left Parliament after the 2009 general election but in the next general election in 2014, he stood again as an ANC candidate for election. He was ranked 13th on the ANC's regional party list and did not initially secure a seat. Moreover, in subsequent years, the party amended its list and removed Mahlangu so that he would not be in contention to join the assembly mid-term when casual vacancies arose; the party's provincial leadership said that he and others had been removed "voluntarily and without prejudice".
