= Roelie Groenewald =

South African politician (born 1950)

Member of the National Assembly
- In office May 1994 – June 1999

Personal details
- Born: Rudolph Hendrik Groenewald; 14 July 1950 (age 75)
- Citizenship: South Africa
- Party: National Party

Rudolph Hendrik "Roelie" Groenewald (born 14 July 1950) is a South African politician who represented the National Party (NP) in the National Assembly from 1994 to 1999. He was elected to his seat in the 1994 general election and served as his party's deputy spokesman on justice.

Groenewald stood for re-election in 1999 as a candidate for the New National Party, the NP's successor. However, he was ranked 8th on the regional party list for Gauteng and therefore failed to gain re-election.
