= Glen Carelse =

South African politician

Member of the National Assembly
- In office May 1994 – June 1999

Personal details
- Citizenship: South Africa
- Party: Democratic Party (since 1999); New National Party (1997–99); National Party (until 1997)

Glen Morris Edwin Carelse is a South African politician who represented the National Party (NP) in the National Assembly from 1994 to 1999. He was elected to his seat in the 1994 general election.

Ahead of the 1999 general election, Carelse was listed 19th on the party list of the New National Party (NNP), the NP's successor party, in the Western Cape. Carelse along with Chris Wyngaard and Pauline Cupido, reportedly complained to the party leadership about their low ranking on the list; by mid-December 1998, the Mail & Guardian said that he was "on the verge of quitting" the party. Several weeks later, in January 1999, he and the others announced that they would resign from the NNP to join the Democratic Party (DP). However, he was not re-elected to Parliament under the DP banner when the general election took place.
