= Bernard Molewa =

South African politician (born 1921)

Member of the National Assembly
- In office May 1994 – April 2004
- Constituency: North West

Personal details
- Born: Bernard Gilbert Molewa; 15 September 1921
- Citizenship: South Africa
- Party: African National Congress

Bernard Gilbert Molewa (15 September 1921 – 2004) was a South African politician and anti-apartheid activist. He represented the African National Congress (ANC) in the National Assembly from 1994 to 2004, gaining election in 1994 and 1999.

Molewa was born on 15 September 1921. He joined the ANC before it was banned by the apartheid government in 1960. After the introduction of the Bantu Education Act in 1955, he, with David Bopape and others, was an instrumental figure in establishing ANC "culture clubs", designed to supplement the inferior resources of the black education system. Molewa went into exile with the ANC in the early 1960s. He is deceased.
