= Sam Moeti =

South African politician and broadcaster (1933–2006)

Member of the National Assembly
- In office May 1994 – June 1999
- Constituency: Northern Province

Personal details
- Born: Samuel Edwin Moeti; 6 February 1933 (age 93) Tshivhangani, Elim; Northern Transvaal, Union of South Africa
- Died: September 2006 (aged 73) Sandton, Gauteng; Republic of South Africa
- Party: African National Congress

Samuel Edwin Moeti (6 February 1933 – September 2006) was a South African politician and radio broadcaster who was a cultural leader of the Lemba people in Limpopo. He represented the African National Congress (ANC) in the National Assembly from 1994 to 1999, and in 2000 he was elected as the inaugural mayor of Vhembe District Municipality.

== Early life and career ==
Moeti was born on 6 February 1933 at Tshivhangani in Elim in the former Northern Transvaal. He trained as a teacher and completed his bachelor's degree at the University of South Africa, as well as several postgraduate diplomas at various institutions. He began his career as a teacher in the Orange Free State in 1954. In 1958, he established and became founding principal of a higher primary school at Ha-Masakona in present-day Vhembe, the first such school to use Venda as a medium of instruction.

In 1967, Moeti left teaching to become a radio presenter at the South African Broadcasting Corporation. Over the next decade, he had a burgeoning career as a radio presenter and journalist, ultimately becoming principal presenter at Radio Venda and then director of Radio Thohoyandou. In 1981, he left the radio industry to join the government of the Venda bantustan, initially as director-general in the Department of Information and Broadcasting. After the 1990 military coup in Venda, he was appointed as secretary-general of the military government, and he held that position until the bantustan was abolished in 1994.

== Post-apartheid political career ==
In South Africa's first post-apartheid elections in 1994, Moeti was elected to represent the ANC in the National Assembly, where he chaired the Portfolio Committee on Communications.

In the 2000 local government elections, Moeti was elected as executive mayor of the newly incorporated Vhembe District Municipality.

== Personal life and death ==
In 1974, he married Lydia Nana, with whom he had one son, named Gulani. He was a member of the Lemba people and was a prominent leader in the Lemba Cultural Association until his death.

On 20 September 2006, Moeti was admitted to hospital in Sandton. He died several days later.
