= Stanley Mogoba =

South African activist and bishop (born 1933)

Member of the National Assembly
- In office 1997 – February 2004

President of the Pan Africanist Congress
- In office December 1996 – June 2003
- Deputy: Motsoko Pheko
- Preceded by: Clarence Makwetu
- Succeeded by: Motsoko Pheko

Personal details
- Born: Mmutlanyane Stanley Mogoba; 29 March 1933 (age 93) Polokwane, Northern Transvaal; Union of South Africa
- Party: Pan Africanist Congress
- Education: University of South Africa
- Church: Methodist Church of Southern Africa

Mmutlanyane Stanley Mogoba (born 29 March 1933) is a retired South African politician and Methodist minister. He was the president of the Pan Africanist Congress (PAC) from 1996 to 2003 and represented the party in the National Assembly from 1997 to 2004. A former anti-apartheid activist and alumnus of Robben Island, he was presiding bishop of the Methodist Church of Southern Africa from 1988 until 1996.

== Early life and activism ==
Mogoba was born on 29 March 1933 in Polokwane in the former Northern Transvaal. He was the youngest of six siblings, born to a father who was a teacher and Methodist lay preacher. Influenced by Flag Boshielo of the Communist Party of South Africa, he joined the African National Congress (ANC) Youth League while at high school. He completed a bachelor's degree at the University of South Africa in 1954 and qualified as a teacher. He was active in the Transvaal United African Teachers Association and used his position as a high school teacher to further his students' political education.

In 1959, Mogoba attended a public meeting addressed by Robert Sobukwe, who impressed him. After Sobukwe broke away from the ANC to form the PAC, Mogoba became closely associated with the latter grouping, even after it was banned by the apartheid government in 1960. In early 1963, he was arrested at his home in Mamelodi and convicted of furthering the aims of the outlawed PAC, for which he spent three years in prison, primarily on Robben Island. While serving his sentence, he felt a religious calling and began studying theology.

Upon his release in 1966, Mogoba was served with a banning order, in terms of which he was banished to Phokwane and barred from working as a teacher. He worked as an administrative clerk instead. In January 1969, he began his career as a minister on probation in the Methodist church, and the following year he began a three-year course of study at John Wesley College's campus in Alice. He was ordained upon the completion of his course. In 1988, he was elected as the presiding bishop of the Methodist Church of Southern Africa. He served a record eight years in the office, gaining re-election twice.

== Post-apartheid political career ==
=== Election as PAC president: 1996 ===
At the PAC's fifth annual conference in Thohoyandou in December 1996, Mogoba was elected unopposed as president of the party. His primary competition for the position had been the incumbent, Clarence Makwetu, who was persuaded to withdraw from the race and accept another position as PAC chairperson. Mogoba had resigned from the church earlier that month in order to be available for the presidency, and he said that he was not worried about unifying the PAC, given the political diversity of the members of his church.

In his capacity as PAC president, Mogoba presided over the official disbanding of the Azanian People's Liberation Army (APLA), the PAC's armed wing during apartheid. He also led the party through its campaign ahead of the 1999 general election, and during that period controversially called for criminals to be punished by amputation. In addition, after his election, he was nominated to fill a PAC seat in the National Assembly.

=== Sell-out rumours: 1997 ===
In September 1997, while Mogoba was serving in Parliament, questions about his integrity emerged after media reports claimed that President Nelson Mandela had advised him not to seek a seat on the Portfolio Committee on Intelligence in order to avoid the "indignity" of a security clearance check. The PAC interpreted the reports as an attempt to portray Mogoba as a security risk and sell-out. Sources told the media that Mogoba was unsuitable for security clearance because he had turned state witness during the 1988 trial of Enoch Zulu, a former APLA commander who was convicted of terrorism by the apartheid state. Mogoba conceded that he had testified during the trial, but said that he had done so on the advice of the PAC after he was subpoenaed. He also said that his testimony had not incriminated Zulu beyond his admission that he had harboured Zulu at his house in Durban. At a PAC press conference in October, Mogoba's account was confirmed by PAC stalwart Johnson Mlambo – who said that Zulu had in fact incriminated Mogoba, by confessing to the police that Mogoba had aided him – and by Zulu himself.

However, later the same week, Zulu changed his story and told press that Mogoba had betrayed him. The lawyer who had represented him at the trial, Dikgang Moseneke, labelled his claims as "nonsense", saying that Mogoba was "the real hero" for having harboured APLA commanders at his house. Nonetheless, the PAC reacted furiously, claiming that Zulu was undertaking a character assassination exercise because he supported former PAC president Clarence Makwetu, whom Mogoba had ousted. In addition, PAC MP Patricia de Lille claimed in a parliamentary debate that the ANC was aware that several of its own members had been spies for the apartheid state. She said that the ANC possessed a list of such spies, and she named several serving politicians – including cabinet ministers Joe Modise, Stella Sigcau, and Penuell Maduna – as being on the list.

=== Second parliamentary term: 1999–2003 ===
The PAC's performance in the 1999 election was extremely poor and Mogoba offered to resign from his party office. He was nonetheless nominated to one of the party's three remaining seats in the National Assembly, where he served alongside Patricia de Lille and his deputy, Motsoko Pheko. During his time in Parliament, he was critical of President Thabo Mbeki's HIV/AIDS policy and favoured higher taxation to eradicate poverty.

Although the PAC did not accept Mogoba's 1999 offer to resign from the party presidency, over the next few years he faced continuous internal pressure for leadership change. The pressure came to a head in the run-up to the party's 2003 elective congress. Although Mogoba initially said he intended to stand for re-election, he announced in June 2003 that he would step down. His former deputy, Motsoko Pheko, succeeded him as PAC president. In February 2004, he also resigned from the National Assembly, ceding his seat to Pheko's new deputy, Themba Godi. In later years, as the PAC was divided by factionalism, Mogoba was aligned to the faction supported by Pheko, as opposed to the one led by Pheko's successor, Letlapa Mphahlele.

== Personal life ==
Mogoba's first wife died in the late 1960s. In 1969, he remarried to Johanna Mamongae Mahlare, with whom he has three children.
