= Senzo Mfayela =

South African politician (1961–2025)

Member of the National Assembly
- In office May 1994 – June 1999

Personal details
- Born: Senzo Brian Mfayela; 23 November 1961
- Died: 16 February 2025 (aged 63)
- Citizenship: South Africa
- Party: Inkatha Freedom Party
- Children: 6
- Education: University of Fort Hare

Senzo Brian Mfayela (23 November 1961 – 16 February 2025) was a South African businessman and politician who represented the Inkatha Freedom Party (IFP) in the National Assembly from 1994 to 1999. He was the chief executive officer of Mangosuthu Buthelezi's Buthelezi Foundation.

== Early life and career ==
Born on 23 November 1961, Mfayela attended Fort Hare University until he was expelled for participating in student-organised boycotts. His father represented the IFP (then called Inkatha) in the KwaZulu Legislative Assembly, and he joined the party's Central Committee before the end of apartheid. During the Truth and Reconciliation Commission, it was wrongly reported that testimony had implicated Mfayela in political assassinations in Natal during apartheid; the testimony in fact implicated another person of the same surname. That person is his father.

== Post-apartheid career ==
Mfayela was elected to the National Assembly in South Africa's first post-apartheid elections in 1994. While serving in his seat, he was also the IFP's national organiser. He served a single term in his seat: although he was nominated to stand for re-election in 1999, he narrowly failed to gain re-election, and weeks after the vote, he announced that he was leaving frontline politics to pursue a business career.

After resigning from politics, he was appointed an executive director at Masithembe Investments, a KwaZulu-Natal-based black economic empowerment consortium led by Ziba Jiyane. In later years, he held several business interests, including shares and directorships in IFP-linked companies and in Dezzo Holdings, a politically connected company that was controversially awarded a R2.1-billion housing contract with the government in 2011. He was until his death the chief executive officer of the Buthelezi Foundation, a charitable foundation that aims to "preserve the legacy" of its patron, IFP founder Mangosuthu Buthelezi. Senzo died on 16 February 2025, at the age of 63.
