= New National Party (South Africa) =

1997–2005 political party in South Africa

New National Party Nuwe Nasionale Party
- Abbreviation: NNP
- Leader: Marthinus van Schalkwyk
- Founded: 8 September 1997
- Dissolved: 9 April 2005
- Preceded by: National Party
- Merged into: Democratic Alliance; African National Congress
- Ideology: Conservatism; Christian democracy South African nationalism Non-racialism; Federalism (South African)
- Political position: Centre-right to Right-wing
- International affiliation: International Democracy Union

Party flag

The New National Party (NNP; Afrikaans: Nuwe Nasionale Party) was a South African political party formed in 1997 as the successor to the National Party, which had ruled the country from 1948 to 1994. The name change was an attempt to distance itself from its apartheid past, and reinvent itself as a moderate, mainstream conservative and non-racist federal party. The attempt was largely unsuccessful, and in 2005 the New National Party voted to disband itself.

== Foundation and political platform ==
The NP entered the democratic era led by former president of South Africa F. W. de Klerk, the winner with Nelson Mandela of the Nobel Peace Prize for his role in dismantling apartheid. He was succeeded by Marthinus van Schalkwyk until the eventual disbanding and merger of the party with the African National Congress (ANC). Van Schalkwyk renamed the party towards the end of 1997. In February 1996, the party had announced that it would become a nonracial, Christian-Democratic political organization, and Van Schalkwyk sought to build on this in his efforts to rebrand the NNP as a nonracial, value driven party.

But the New National Party had some difficulty carving out a political base in post-apartheid South Africa. On the one hand, it still had the legacy of its role under apartheid. On the other hand, it seemed uncertain about its relationship with the government led by the ANC and seemed unable to decide whether it was in a political alliance with the ANC or in opposition. These two issues led to defections to the Democratic Party (DP), which had a historical legacy of being anti-apartheid and was clearly an opposition party to the ANC. It also lost support to other parties.

== Election results and alliances ==
The NNP fared poorly in the general election of 1999. With 6.87% of the vote, the party lost votes both to the DP and ANC as well as its status as the official opposition nationally and in most provinces. But it remained influential in the Western Cape province, where it was the party of government, despite being pushed into second place there by the ANC. The party faced comparatively smaller losses in the province in large part due to the retention of most of its coloured support, but it also fared better with white voters than in most other provinces. 50% of its voter base now came from this one province, and despite retaining representation in all nine provincial legislatures, it was seemingly becoming a regional political force.

The party remained in power in the Western Cape through a coalition with the Democratic Party. The two then began to plan a merger in 2000, under the name Democratic Alliance (DA). By 2001 the party had broken away from the DA before the merger could be completed, and instead entered close co-operation with the ANC. In December 2001, the NNP formed a new provincial coalition with the ANC in the Western Cape, and members of the NNP were appointed to the national cabinet.

During the general election of 2004, the NNP was almost eliminated from parliament. Much of its support deserted the party, due to unhappiness with its alliance with the ANC, and its share of the national vote dropped from 6.87% in 1999 to 1.65%, having been 20.4% under the National Party name in 1994. The party was all but wiped out in most provinces and retained only limited pockets of large support in the Western Cape, where it was pushed into a distant third place behind the DA in its former stronghold.

== Dissolution and merger with the ANC ==
With the former governing party now only the sixth-largest in the country, questions were asked about its long-term future, and the leadership of Van Schalkwyk. Despite his party's poor performance in the polls, Van Schalkwyk was given the cabinet post of Minister of Environmental Affairs and Tourism, seen as a reward for aligning the NNP with the ANC.

At its assembly on 9 April 2005, the NNP's Federal Council voted by 88 to 2 to disband. It also settled its outstanding debt of R5.2 million to the Absa Group Limited, in preparation for dissolution.

With effect 5 August 2005, all NNP members of parliament became members of the ANC, in accordance with the system of crossing the floor in South Africa, which allowed politicians, elected on one party ticket, to defect to other parties or becoming independents. This system was repealed in 2009.

== Electoral history ==
=== National Assembly elections ===
Election	Party leader	Votes	%	Seats	+/–	Position	Result
1999	Marthinus van Schalkwyk	1,098,215	6.87%	28 / 400	▼54	▼4th	Opposition
2004	Marthinus van Schalkwyk	257,824	1.65%	7 / 400	▼21	▼6th	Opposition
