= 22nd South African Parliament =

Parliament of South Africa, 1994–1999

Makeup of the National Assembly in the 22nd Parliament ANC NP IFP VF DP other parties

Makeup of the Senate in the 22nd Parliament

Makeup of the National Council of Provinces in the 22nd Parliament; a darker shade represents a permanent delegate while a lighter shade represents a special delegate

The 22nd Parliament of the Republic of South Africa was elected in the elections of 27 April 1994; it was the first parliament in South Africa's history to be elected by voters of all races. Nelson Mandela's African National Congress formed a government of national unity with F. W. de Klerk's National Party and Mangosuthu Buthelezi's Inkatha Freedom Party. The three racially based houses from previous parliaments were replaced with the re-introduced Senate and National Assembly. In 1997, on the introduction of the final Constitution, the Senate was replaced by the National Council of Provinces, which continues to serve as the upper house of South Africa's Parliament.

== See also ==
- List of members of the National Assembly of South Africa, 1994–1999
- List of members of the Senate of South Africa, 1994–1999
