= Carl Niehaus =

South African politician (b. 1959)

The Honourable Carl Niehaus MP
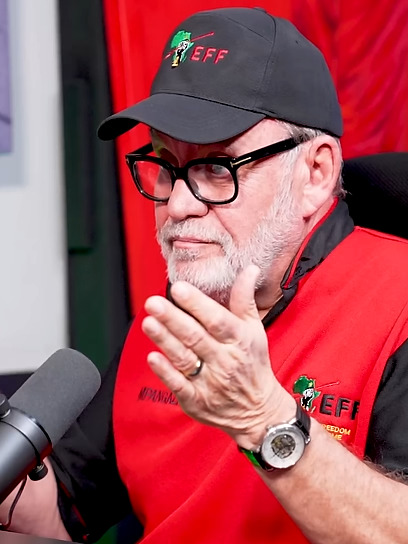
- Niehaus in 2024

Member of the National Assembly
- Incumbent
- Assumed office 14 June 2024
- In office 1994–1996

Personal details
- Born: Carl Gerhardus Niehaus; 25 December 1959 (age 66) Zeerust, Western Transvaal; Union of South Africa
- Party: Economic Freedom Fighters (since 2023)
- Other political affiliations: African Radical Economic Transformation Alliance (2023); African National Congress (1980–2022)
- Spouse(s): Noluthando Mdluli (m. 2022) Jansie Lourens (m. 1986; div. 2002)
- Education: University of South Africa

Carl Gerhardus Niehaus (born 25 December 1959) is a South African politician who represents the Economic Freedom Fighters (EFF) in the National Assembly of South Africa. A former national spokesperson of the African National Congress (ANC), he was expelled from that party for misconduct in December 2022. He joined the EFF in December 2023 and was elected to the National Assembly in May 2024.

Born to an Afrikaner family in the Western Transvaal, Niehaus became involved in anti-apartheid activism as a student, joining the ANC underground in 1980. Between November 1983 and March 1991, he was imprisoned on treason charges related to his activism, particularly an ANC plot to sabotage the Johannesburg Gas Works.

Upon his release from prison, he became an influential figure in the ANC: after a stint as the party's spokesperson during the post-apartheid transition, he served as a Member of the National Assembly from 1994 to 1996, as South African Ambassador to the Netherlands from 1996 to 2000, and as a member of the ANC National Executive Committee from 1994 to 1997. He returned to the ANC media office as the party's national spokesperson in November 2008. However, in February 2009, he resigned from that office and confessed to a string of improprieties that he had committed due to his personal financial problems.

He returned to frontline politics in 2017 as the national spokesperson of the UMkhonto we Sizwe Military Veterans' Association. From 2019, he was also employed at Luthuli House as a staffer in the office of ANC secretary-general Ace Magashule. During this period, he frequently clashed with the ANC leadership over his outspoken support of former President Jacob Zuma and the Zuma-aligned programme of radical economic transformation (RET). His pro-Zuma public statements resulted in the suspension of his ANC membership in July 2021 and, ultimately, his expulsion from the party in December 2022. In the aftermath, he established his own short-lived political platforms – the Radical Economic Transformation Movement (RETMO) and African Radical Economic Transformation Alliance (ARETA) – before joining the EFF in December 2023.

== Early life and activism ==
Niehaus was born on 25 December 1959 in Zeerust, a small town in the former Western Transvaal (now part of the North West Province). His parents, Carl and Magrieta Niehaus, were working-class Afrikaners; his father was a railroad clerk. In his account, they later supported the far-right Conservative Party, and they raised him Christian in the Dutch Reformed Church. Indeed, for a time he intended to become a dominee.

After his family moved in Johannesburg, he took church volunteering trips to Soweto, where, as a teenager, he was disturbed by the black residents' living conditions; he later said that he came to believe that apartheid was heresy. He became active in anti-apartheid activism as a student at the Rand Afrikaans University, where he studied theology. During his final year as a student, in 1980, he left the Dutch Reformed Church in protest of their stance on apartheid; he joined the African Dutch Reformed Church instead, serving as a deacon in the black township of Alexandra. In July 1980, he joined the underground of the African National Congress (ANC), which at the time was a banned organisation. He was later described as having been "terribly radical, almost Stalinist" in his political style.

Shortly before his final exams in 1980, Niehaus was expelled from Rand Afrikaans University for his political activities, including putting up Free Mandela posters on campus. Thereafter he enrolled at the University of the Witwatersrand to continue his degree.

=== Treason conviction and detention ===
On one side there is the violence which is institutionalized in South African society. On the other side there is the kind of violence employed by the ANC. It is not that the ANC enjoys exploding bombs. It has been forced to it by the South African government and as long as the situation goes on, bombs will continue to explode.

— Niehaus testifies about the ANC's armed struggle, November 1983

In August 1983, Niehaus and his girlfriend, Jansie Lourens, were arrested and charged with high treason and related political charges. Because of the defendants' backgrounds, the case attracted "hostility, puzzlement, and considerable interest" among white audiences.

During their trial in the Supreme Court, the main state's witness was Robert Whitecross, Niehaus and Lourens's housemate. During his testimony, he revealed that he had been recruited to the Security Branch by Craig Williamson in 1980 and was in fact a police warrant officer. Among other things, Whitecross was able to provide extensive evidence that Niehaus had been involved in reconnaissance of the Johannesburg Gas Works, apparently as part of an ANC plot to commit sabotage there. Whitecross had accompanied Niehaus on a reconnaissance trip which had been photographed by other police officers; Niehaus had also given Whitecross the photographs he had taken of the site.

Niehaus pled not guilty to treason, but in court he openly declared his support for the ANC and was otherwise unrepentant. The court found that, in addition to reconnaissance at the gasworks, Niehaus had distributed political pamphlets, helped ANC members to escape the country illegally, and carried coded messages between ANC members. On 25 November 1983, he was convicted and sentenced to fifteen years in prison. According to reporter Allister Sparks, who was in the courtroom, Niehaus called out Amandla! before being led into custody. Incarcerated in Pretoria Central Prison, he served over seven of his sentence before he was released on 20 March 1991.

In 2008, LitNet published a blog by Niehaus – written in the form of an open letter to his young daughter – in which he described having been gang-raped by other detainees on the night before the Supreme Court convicted him in 1983. Journalists have since disputed this account for a lack of corroborating evidence. In February 2021, Niehaus testified at the inquest into Neil Aggett's death in detention; he was cross-examined on the contents of an affidavit he had submitted about his experience of torture in detention.

=== Education ===
While he was imprisoned, Niehaus studied theology by correspondence through the University of South Africa, completing both a bachelor's and an honours. He was reportedly the best student in his honours class.

Until 2009, Niehaus's résumé and official profile additionally claimed that he had completed his first bachelor's degree at the University of the Witwatersrand before his arrest, and that he later completed a masters and doctorate in theology at Utrecht University. Journalists discovered that he did not complete any of these degrees.

== Career in the African National Congress ==
=== Democratic transition: 1991–1994 ===
Upon his release from prison, Niehaus became active in the African National Congress (ANC), which had recently been unbanned by the apartheid government during the negotiations to end apartheid. According to his official biography, he was appointed to the ANC's Provincial Executive Committee in PWV, to its Negotiations Commission, and to the head of its national media liaison unit, where he served as spokesperson to Nelson Mandela.

=== Early democratic period: 1994–2009 ===
In South Africa's first democratic elections in April 1994, Niehaus was elected to represent the ANC in the National Assembly, the lower house of the new South African Parliament. He chaired Parliament's Portfolio Committee on Correctional Services during the First Parliament. In addition, in December 1994, he attended the ANC's 49th National Conference, at which he was elected to a three-year term on the party's National Executive Committee; by number of votes received, he was ranked 20th of the 60 candidates elected to the committee.

In late 1996, before the parliamentary term had ended, President Mandela appointed Niehaus to succeed Zach de Beer as South African Ambassador to the Netherlands. While in the Netherlands, he was the head of the South African delegation to the Organisation for the Prohibition of Chemical Weapons at the Hague. At the conclusion of his diplomatic service in mid-2000, Queen Beatrix of the Netherlands knighted him in the Grand Cross in the Order of Oranje-Nassau. He also received Utrecht University's International Medal.

Upon his return to South Africa, Niehaus became executive director of the National Institute for Crime Prevention and Re-integration of Offenders (Nicro) with effect from 1 June 2000. On Reconciliation Day, 2000, during a gathering at St George's Cathedral, Niehaus and Mary Burton launched the Home For All initiative, which called on white South Africans to contribute to national reconciliation by publicly acknowledging and redressing the harm of apartheid. Niehaus and Burton co-authored a "Declaration of Commitment by White South Africans" in this vein. Although it was signed by over 900 prominent white South Africans, it was fiercely denigrated by others. Niehaus later said that the initiative's reception – "rejection and a lot of ridicule" – had been instrumental in "hardening my views on the issue of white racism".

In 2001, Niehaus left NICRO to become a partner at professional services firm Deloitte & Touche, which at the time was launching a Dutch desk. He resigned from that position in 2003, and thereafter held a series of short-lived positions: the South African Presidency contracted him to work on its Decade of Democracy celebrations in 2004; he was CEO and spokesperson of Ray McCauley's Rhema Church from 2004 until his resignation in 2005; and, finally, he was CEO of the Gauteng Economic Development Agency (GEDA), a department of the Gauteng Provincial Government, for the last seven months of 2005.

In November 2008, during the ANC's 2009 general election campaign, Niehaus returned to the ANC's communications department when he was appointed as the party's second national spokesperson, working alongside Jessie Duarte. He was reportedly headhunted for the role by ANC secretary-general Gwede Mantashe. The Daily Maverick said that he was "by almost all accounts, very good" at the job. However, he was in the position for just over three months: on 13 February 2009, the press broke the story of Niehaus's financial difficulties and related fraud, and Mantashe announced that the party had accepted Niehaus's resignation as spokesperson.

=== Support for RET: 2017–2022 ===
Niehaus spent much of the next decade away from frontline politics; in his account he was doing consulting work and managing his remaining debt. In 2017, he resurfaced as national spokesperson for the ANC-affiliated UMkhonto we Sizwe Military Veterans' Association (MKMVA) and as a frequent commentator on ANN7. He also became a key lobbyist in Nkosazana Dlamini-Zuma's campaign to be elected as ANC president. It was during this time that Niehaus was referred to as "a massive poes, and an embarrassment to the human race." Dlamini-Zuma lost to Cyril Ramaphosa at the ANC's 54th National Conference in December 2017, but Niehaus nonetheless was given a role in Ramaphosa's new administration: from January 2019, he worked at Luthuli House in the office of ANC secretary-general Ace Magashule.

Over the next three years, MKMVA and Niehaus himself increasingly came into conflict with the Ramaphosa-led National Executive Committee. Niehaus was the voice of MKMVA's battle to resist amalgamation into a new and more formalised structure for veterans. He also used his personal and MKMVA platforms to defend corruption-accused former President Jacob Zuma, to attack the ANC's leadership, and to promote an ideological programme of so-called radical economic transformation. In 2018, MKMVA distanced itself from remarks that Niehaus made about the land question and management of the Ingonyama Trust.

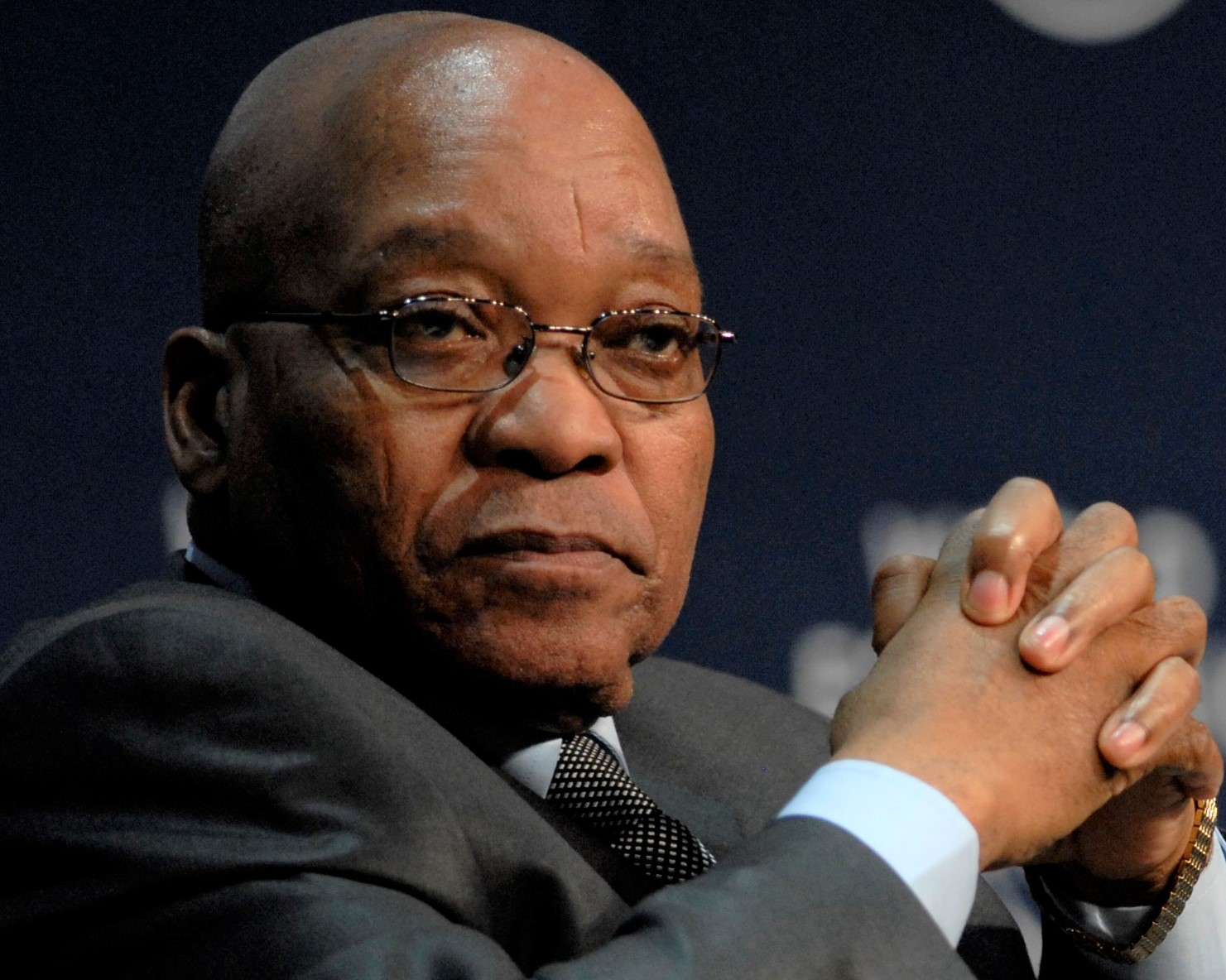
Niehaus is a staunch defender of former President Jacob Zuma

This confrontation peaked in July 2021, when the Constitutional Court ordered Zuma's arrest on contempt of court charges. Niehaus joined MKMVA in militant opposition to the court's order; during one of a series of gatherings outside Zuma's Nkandla homestead, he told the press that MKMVA would "form a human shield" around Zuma to protect him from arrest and "warned" that Zuma's imprisonment would cause "instability and unrest". On 7 July, the ANC issued Niehaus with formal disciplinary charges, alleging that remarks he had made at Nkandla contravened the ANC's disciplinary rules. His ANC membership was suspended pending a disciplinary hearing. The following day, Niehaus regrouped with Zuma's supporters at a protest outside the Estcourt Correctional Centre, where Zuma had been jailed; he was promptly arrested by the local South African Police Service for contravening COVID-19 lockdown rules, though he was released soon afterwards with a R3,000 fine.

While Niehaus awaited his disciplinary hearing, he was also fired as an ANC staffer: on 9 September, he was summarily dismissed from his position in the secretary-general's office after he made another provocative public statement. ANC spokesman Pule Mabe said that his behaviour had been "divisive, opportunistic and anti-ANC". In March 2022, he was barred from joining the MKMVA's successor organisation on the grounds that he had never been a member of Umkhonto we Sizwe. Meanwhile, the disciplinary proceedings, lodged against Niehaus in his capacity as an ANC member, did not conclude until 12 December 2022, when the ANC's National Disciplinary Committee found Niehaus guilty of misconduct and expelled him from the ANC. Niehaus immediately appealed. On 23 December, in the aftermath of the ANC's 55th National Conference, Niehaus announced his "resignation" from the ANC, saying that he would not pursue further an appeal against his expulsion.

== Career in opposition politics ==
=== RETMO and ARETA: 2023 ===
Less than a month after his expulsion from the ANC, in a Twitter Space on 11 January 2023, Niehaus announced the launch of the Radical Economic Transformation Movement (RETMO). The movement was formed to lobby for radical economic transformation, and Niehaus, as its chairperson, outlined a ten-point policy platform that included land expropriation without compensation, opposition to the privatisation of state-owned enterprises, and stronger border policing. City Press reported that two prominent Zuma allies, Magashule and Tony Yengeni, had been instrumental in the movement's establishment.

On 22 February, RETMO was superseded by African Radical Economic Transformation Alliance (ARETA), a political party which Niehaus launched during an event in Johannesburg; he said the party would consider contesting the next elections. ARETA participated in the so-called National Shutdown the next month. However, the party was short-lived: Niehaus abandoned it on 14 December 2023, when he announced that he would join the Economic Freedom Fighters (EFF).

=== Economic Freedom Fighters: 2023–present ===
As a newly minted member of the EFF, Niehaus denied rumours that he was planning to abscond to Zuma's new Umkhonto we Sizwe Party, and in March 2024 the EFF announced that Niehaus would be ranked 27th on its party list in the May 2024 general election. Elected to an EFF seat, he was sworn in to the National Assembly on 14 June 2024.

== Dishonesty scandals ==
In February 2009, the Mail & Guardian's Pearlie Joubert published a lengthy exposé about Niehaus's "broad trail of bad debt and broken promises". In the same article, confronted by Joubert, he confessed to a series of improprieties, admitting that he was a serial overspender and had left his last few jobs – at Deloitte & Touche, Rhema Church, and GEDA – due to mismanagement of his personal debt and continued borrowing. In the case of GEDA, he admitted that he had attempted to secure a personal loan using a fraudulent letter on which he forged the signatures of four Gauteng provincial ministers (Paul Mashatile, Ignatius Jacobs, Angie Motshekga, and Khabisi Mosunkutu); he had resigned after confessing the fraud to Minister Mashatile. He disputed further claims that his 2004 contract with the Presidency was terminated early because of claims of financial impropriety.

Most of what you've confronted me with is true. I wish it wasn't. I've made massive mistakes and I've disappointed a lot of people terribly. I've no illusions that if you publish this article it will mean the end of my career. I asked people like Saki Macozoma, Cyril Ramaphosa, Tokyo Sexwale, Gill Marcus, Pallo Jordan and Rick Menell to help me financially. I was down and out. Some of them gave me money and some didn’t. I am terribly indebted. I also received money from Brett Kebble...The ANC job is a lifesaver for me and things have gone wrong now in a terrible way. I have to be trustworthy to do my job. I live under no illusions about what this article can do to my life. I wish I could turn back the clock.

— Niehaus's confession to the Mail & Guardian, February 2009

Niehaus's confession immediately became a major story, and he resigned as ANC spokesperson later the same day. Meanwhile, other media houses launched their own investigations into Niehaus's affairs and published new allegations, including that he had falsely claimed his sister had died in order to obtain business-class airfare from a law firm where he done BEE consulting, and that he had falsely claimed to have leukemia in order to obtain a free holiday to Mauritius from a travel agency. The Times estimated that he was more than R4.4 million in debt, though ANC-affiliated businessman Vivian Reddy said publicly that he would provide Niehaus with financial support. Also during this period, the Beeld broke the story that Niehaus had lied on his résumé.

Niehaus's financial affairs continued to attract media attention in later years. On 1 May 2012, he gave his first interview since the February 2009 scandal, appearing on John Robbie's Radio 702 talk show to announce that he had repaid all his debts and expected to be appointed to "a formal position" in the ANC administration. The ANC denied the latter claim, and several creditors came forward to dispute the former, including Deputy Minister Derek Hanekom, ANC-affiliated trade union SACCAWU, and Niehaus's former landlord in Midrand. The Mail & Guardian also reported that in late 2011 Niehaus had received a small amount of money from Deputy Justice Minister Andries Nel, ostensibly to cover Niehaus's father's burial expenses, which led to some confusion when Nel went to Zeerust to pay his respects but found no burial. Niehaus said that it was a miscommunication.

In December 2017, after Niehaus had returned to political prominence, the Sunday Times's Toby Shapshak reported that Niehaus owed R4.3 million for two rented apartments in Sandton and that, in a bid to avoid legal action on the debt, he had falsely told his creditors that his mother had died and that he was about to inherit her estate. His mother was in fact alive in a retirement home; she died in October 2023. Niehaus said that the Sunday Times report was part of a smear campaign "by the white-owned media" against allies of Nkosazana Dlamini-Zuma. In May 2018, the same newspaper published another report, this one by Mzilikazi wa Afrika, which alleged that Niehaus was delinquent on other, newly acquired debts.

== Personal life ==
In 1986 in Pretoria Central Prison, Niehaus married Johanna "Jansie" Lourens, who was imprisoned alongside him in 1983; they had met at university, where she had recruited him into the armed struggle. Their daughter was born in the Netherlands during Niehaus's ambassadorship and is named after Helen Joseph. After Niehaus and Lourens divorced in 2002, Niehaus remarried Linda Thango, a management consultant. He married his third wife, businesswoman Mafani Gunguluza, in September 2008. In 2012, he told Radio 702 that he was separated from Gunguluza, and in 2019 he was reported as having a new girlfriend. In 2022, he married Noluthando Mdluli, a businesswoman and model.

Niehaus's memoir, Om te veg vir hoop, was published in English as Fighting for Hope in 2003. The Daily Maverick said it was "a slim, unpretentious memoir" and "Niehaus at his most likeable". He is still a practising Christian. In December 2017, Niehaus said that he would make a formal complaint to Wikipedia about vandalism of the Wikipedia article about him.
