= Themba Khoza =

South African politician (1959–2000)

Member of the National Assembly
- In office 9 May 1994 – 28 May 2000

Personal details
- Born: 17 May 1959 Eshowe, Zululand; Natal, Union of South Africa
- Died: 28 May 2000 (aged 41) Benoni, Gauteng; Republic of South Africa
- Party: Inkatha Freedom Party

Thembinkosi Samson Khoza (17 May 1959 – 28 May 2000) was a South African politician who represented the Inkatha Freedom Party (IFP) in the National Assembly from 1994 until his death in May 2000. He was a former leader of the IFP's Youth Brigade and served as the party's leader in Gauteng province. In the 1980s and 1990s, he was credited with expanding the IFP's political presence in the Transvaal.

At the time of his death, Khoza was awaiting trial on 19 criminal charges arising from his alleged involvement in gunrunning and inciting political violence between IFP supporters and supporters of the African National Congress (ANC) during apartheid. At the Truth and Reconciliation Commission, officers of the police's Security Branch testified that Khoza was a key recipient and distributor of state-supplied weapons, which they said were later used in massacres in the Transvaal.

== Life and early career ==
Khoza was born on 17 May 1959 in Eshowe in Zululand in the former Natal Province. A former bank clerk, he joined the Inkatha Youth Brigade in 1975 and became its leader in the 1980s. He was described as a populist leader and helped establish the national profile of Inkatha (later the IFP) at a time when much of its power base was confined to the KwaZulu bantustan.

In 1990, Khoza opened the party's first organisational office in the Transvaal, and the following year he was elected to the party's national Central Committee. He led Inkatha during a period marked by political violence between Inkatha supporters and supporters of the rival African National Congress (ANC).

== Parliament: 1994–2000 ==
In South Africa's first post-apartheid elections in 1994, Khoza was elected to represent the IFP in the new National Assembly. However, also in 1994, Khoza was ousted from the provincial leadership of the IFP in Gauteng (the former Transvaal), failing even to gain re-election to an ordinary seat on the provincial executive committee. By 1996, he was reportedly engaged in a power struggle with his rival in the Gauteng IFP, Musa Myeni. Khoza subsequently returned to his former office as IFP provincial leader.

Ahead of the 1999 general election, Khoza was co-chair, with the ANC's Mathole Motshekga, of a joint IFP–ANC committee established in Gauteng to monitor and ease tensions between the parties. He was re-elected to his parliamentary seat in that election and served in the National Assembly until his death, although he was excused from his duties from April 2000 onwards due to illness.

== Political violence ==
At the time of his death in 2000, Khoza was awaiting trial on 19 criminal charges arising from his alleged involvement in the IFP–ANC political violence of the late 1980s and early 1990s, particularly in the townships of the Vaal and East Rand. The charges included incitement to violence; gunrunning; and attempted murder, in connection with the deaths of two ANC members in 1990. Though he had long had a reputation as the IFP's "warlord-in-chief", the allegations against him received substantiation in evidence collected by the Truth and Reconciliation Commission (TRC) in the mid- and late 1990s.

=== Alleged gunrunning ===
In March 1994, the Goldstone Commission on political violence identified Khoza as among the IFP members involved in receiving and distributing homemade weapons supplied by the Security Branch's Vlakplaas unit, in partial confirmation of the theory that IFP–ANC violence was stimulated by a state-linked third force. The TRC later concluded that links between the IFP and Vlakplaas originated in a 1990 meeting at which Khoza had asked a Vlakplaas operative to supply the party with weapons; Vlakplaas operatives, including commander Eugene de Kock, testified to having provided several consignments of weapons, including homemade explosives and hand-modified AK-47s, to Khoza, who allegedly distributed them among IFP supporters in mineworkers' hostels in the townships. De Kock also testified that Khoza was a paid Security Branch informant, as well as a paid informant of the National Intelligence Service. Khoza denied these allegations.

=== Sebokeng massacre ===
Two Vlakplaas operatives said that they supplied Khoza with the guns and hand grenades that were used in the massacre of 19 people at Sebokeng hostel in September 1990. Moreover, three former policemen applied for amnesty for their role in a cover-up that secured Khoza's acquittal on weapons possession charges in the aftermath of the massacre. Khoza had been arrested the morning after the massacre after being found at the scene with an assortment of weapons in the boot of his Nissan Sentra (which de Kock claimed had been a gift to Khoza from the Security Branch). The policemen involved said that, upon recognising Khoza's political importance, they had tampered with witness statements and with forensic and ballistic evidence in order to ensure that Khoza and the weapons could not be linked to the killings. They also said that they had paid Khoza's bail.

=== Boipatong massacre ===
Khoza was also frequently, though less concretely, linked to the planning and orchestration of the 1992 Boipatong massacre, the most deadly of the period. One of the 16 people convicted of carrying out the killings told the TRC that Khoza had been involved in both planning and executing the attack, including by supplying the killers with weapons obtained from the police. Another said that Khoza had helped cover-up the massacre afterwards, instructing the perpetrators to destroy the goods that they had looted in Boipatong.

Witnesses linked Khoza to other incidents, including the murder of ANC leader Sam Ntuli and the planning of a massacre of 11 people in Nqutu, KwaZulu in 1993. Khoza was apparently a key figure in planning the IFP's March 1994 march on Shell House, which some suggested had been intended as a precursor to an attack on ANC leaders; suggestions of this kind led ANC Secretary-General Cyril Ramaphosa to allege in Parliament that Khoza had a case to answer about the Shell House massacre: Ramaphosa said, "He was the master planner behind that march [on Shell House]. He must stand up here and tell the whole nation what he did on that day".

== Personal life and death ==
He died on 28 May 2000, aged 41, in hospital in Benoni outside Johannesburg. His death coincided with the height of HIV/AIDS epidemic in South Africa and there was much public debate about the nature of his illness, given unconfirmed reports that it was AIDS-related. He was married to Sonosini Khoza and had six children, four sons and two daughters.

== See also ==
- Negotiations to end apartheid
