= UMkhonto we Sizwe Military Veterans' Association =

South African political party

- Abbreviation: MKMVA
- President: Kebby Maphatsoe
- Spokesperson: Carl Niehaus
- Founded: December 1996
- Dissolved: June 2021 (officially)
- Succeeded by: UMkhonto we Sizwe Liberation War Veterans
- Headquarters: Luthuli House; 54 Sauer Street; Johannesburg; Gauteng

The uMkhonto we Sizwe Military Veterans' Association (MKMVA) was an auxiliary political organisation affiliated to South Africa's African National Congress (ANC). It was founded in 1996 to represent the interests of individuals who had participated in the armed struggle against apartheid as members of Umkhonto weSizwe (MK), the ANC's armed wing. Although its relationship to the ANC and MK was not formally or legally codified, the organisation received a degree of de facto recognition both from the ANC and from the ANC-led government.

The status of its authority became increasingly controversial during the presidency of Jacob Zuma, as MKMVA became an increasingly visible participant in pro-Zuma political agitation. Critics, including a rival veterans' organisation called the MK National Council, condemned MKMVA for its intimacy with the controversial Gupta family and for presenting itself as a paramilitary force aligned to Zuma. They also alleged that MKMVA had become bloated with individuals who had not genuinely served in MK before it was disbanded during South Africa's transition to democracy.

Under Cyril Ramaphosa, who succeeded Zuma as ANC president, the ANC instructed MKMVA to disband in June 2021. MKMVA leaders refused to do so and actively opposed Zuma's arrest in June 2021. However, in late April 2022, a joint conference for MK veterans, organised by the ANC, decided that MKMVA and its rivals would be replaced by a single veterans' organisation, to be named the MK Liberation War Veterans.

== Background ==
Umkhonto weSizwe (MK) was the armed wing of the African National Congress (ANC) during apartheid. After being banned by the South African government in 1960, both the ANC and MK operated primarily in exile elsewhere in Southern Africa, where large numbers of young South Africans received military training to conduct armed struggle against the apartheid government – primarily sabotage operations, but also some attempted guerrilla operations and bombing campaigns. MK was disbanded during the transition to democracy in South Africa and was defunct by the time of the first democratic elections in 1994. In the post-apartheid order, former MK combatants, as well as former members of the apartheid-era South African Defence Force, were recognised as veterans of the liberation struggle, including under the Military Veterans Act of 2011. The MK Military Veterans' Association (MKMVA) was established in December 1996 to represent the interests of former MK veterans, both inside the ANC and in dealings with the ANC-led government of South Africa.

== Structure and aims ==
The MKMVA constitution defined MK veterans as individuals who joined MK before the suspension of the armed struggle in 1990 and who never deserted its ranks. Specific objectives included obtaining social security assistance for elderly and disabled veterans and for the dependants of deceased veterans, supporting the reintegration of veterans, and promoting MK's history and heritage. MKMVA also held and administered investments on behalf of its members, including a farm in Doornkuil, Western Cape, which the ANC donated to it.

Like the ANC itself, MKMVA operated in an organisational hierarchy with offices and leadership corps at the local (branch), provincial, and national levels. Also like the ANC, its top national leadership comprised a national executive committee, including the "Top Six" leaders. Until 2017, the head of the organisation was the MKMVA chairperson; at the 5th MKMVA National Conference in 2017 (which was to be the organisation's final national meeting), attendees re-elected the incumbent chairperson, Kebby Maphatsoe, but resolved to change his title to "president".

Because it was composed of former MK members, many of whom were still ANC members, MKMVA was affiliated to the ANC. However, it was not mentioned in the ANC constitution and did not have any formal authority in ANC decision-making or official status in the organisation; in this, it differed from the ANC's three official leagues, including the ANC Veterans' League (which is not limited to MK combatants). However, MKMVA leaders claimed that it retained significant influence over ANC decisions, because many of its members were independently elected to leadership positions in ANC local or provincial branches. MKMVA was also granted office space in the ANC's provincial offices, and as of 2019 it had its national headquarters in Luthuli House, the ANC's Johannesburg headquarters.

== Dispute over status ==
=== Rivalry with MK National Council ===
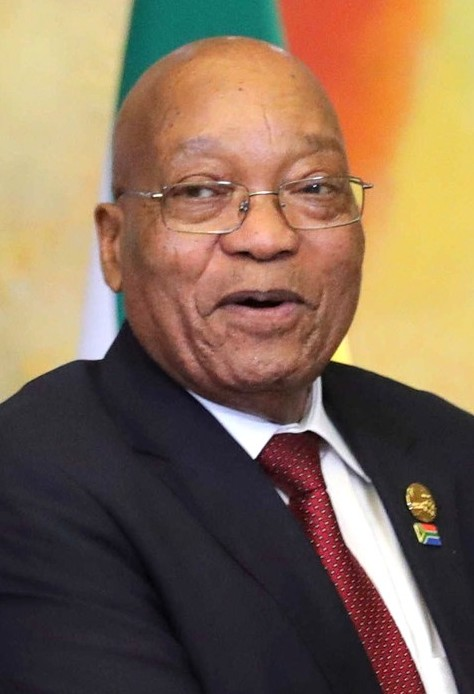
MKMVA's support for President Jacob Zuma became controversial during Zuma's second term.

In 2017, a rival organisation for MK veterans was founded under the leadership of ANC stalwarts including Siphiwe Nyanda. The group, named the MK National Council, was founded in opposition to MKMVA's outspoken support for Jacob Zuma, then ANC president and national president (and a former MK member himself); MKMVA had also endorsed Zuma's ex-wife, Nkosazana Dlamini-Zuma, to succeed Zuma as ANC president at the end of his term in 2017. According to the MK National Council, MKMVA's narrow political agenda left it unable adequately to represent all MK veterans. In subsequent years, the relationship between the organisations became increasingly acrimonious, in particular as MKMVA claimed for itself the right to be viewed as the exclusive legitimate representative of MK veterans.

In 2017, at its 54th National Conference, which also elected Cyril Ramaphosa to succeed Zuma, the ANC resolved that the ANC National Executive Committee (NEC) should lead an inclusive process to unify all MK ex-combatants. In line with this resolution, the NEC launched unity talks between representatives of the different groups, alongside a process intended to verify whether MKMVA members were legitimate veterans. However, the MK National Council withdrew from the talks in 2020, claiming that their convenor, Tony Yengeni of the NEC, was biased towards Zuma and MKMVA – while MKMVA argued that the NEC's Top Six leaders were themselves biased towards the MK National Council. MKMVA remained a staunch opponent of Ramaphosa in this period and continued to support the Zuma-aligned Radical Economic Transformation faction of the ANC. It also spoke out in defence of ANC Secretary-General Ace Magashule, implying that his suspension from the ANC under the step-aside rule had been politically motivated.

=== Dissolution ===
In June 2021, the National Working Committee of the ANC NEC announced that it would disband both MKMVA and MK National Council. It would then begin preparations for an inclusive conference of MK veterans aimed at uniting the groups. While MK National Council said that it would comply with the decision, MKMVA vowed to defy it, saying in a statement:

We will not be disrespected, nor will we bow to a dictatorship. The members of MKMVA, and MKMVA as a legitimate constitutional entity, deserve to be treated with dignity and respect... Under the circumstances, MKMVA is left with no other option but to state categorically that we will not disband. MKMVA will continue with our programmes and the National Executive Committee of MKMVA will continue to carry out our mandate.

Though officially disbanded, MKMVA continued to present itself as an active organisation, and continued to stage pro-Zuma protests as late as July 2021. However, in late April 2022, the ANC and the government's Department of Military Veterans convened the envisioned joint conference, which brought together 570 people, including MKMVA members, MK National Council members, and unaffiliated MK veterans. Although some attendees left the conference in protest, a majority of those present decided to unify all MK veterans under a new organisation, with a new "unity name", MK Liberation War Veterans. The conference was addressed by President Ramaphosa and by his deputy, David Mabuza, whom he had charged with overseeing the verification and unification of MK veterans. The conference adopted an interim constitution, and an interim leadership corps was appointed in late May.

== Controversies ==
=== Legitimacy of veterans ===
Critics frequently pointed out that many of MKMVA's members, or people present at MKMVA events or in MKMVA combat uniform, were "too young to have played any meaningful role in the armed struggle against apartheid" or to have belonged to MK before it was disbanded. The MK National Council frequently made this argument, and additionally argued that Maphatsoe's reelection as leader in 2017 was fraudulent because the vote had not been limited to bona fide veterans. Sources told the Africa Report that MKMVA sought state welfare benefits, designated for military veterans, for all its members, even those too young to plausibly have been in MK. There was particular public controversy about the case of Carl Niehaus, an MKMVA spokesman and prominent member of the group's national executive; an ANC vetting process found that Niehaus had not been an MK member. Ronnie Kasrils and Mavuso Msimang, among others, claimed that Maphatsoe himself had deserted his MK camp, which would have ruled him out as a veteran in terms of MKMVA's own constitution.

=== Alleged political violence ===
MKMVA's critics alleged that MKMVA frequently threatened, and occasionally committed, acts of political violence. In the organisation's final decade, it increasingly volunteered, apparently in an informal capacity, to act as security for the ANC and its leadership, and its threats were frequently directed at Zuma's critics. In 2009, MKMVA deputy secretary-general Ramatuku Maphutha mounted an infamous defence of Zuma, then a presidential candidate in the national elections, during his prosecution on corruption charges. Maphutha said:

Soldiers [from MKMVA] are deployed all over the country and are waiting to be activated from the trenches to fight the National Prosecuting Authority if they fail to drop charges against Zuma. We will not hesitate to take him by force to the Union Buildings. No Jacob Zuma, no country. He is the president for the next 10 years.

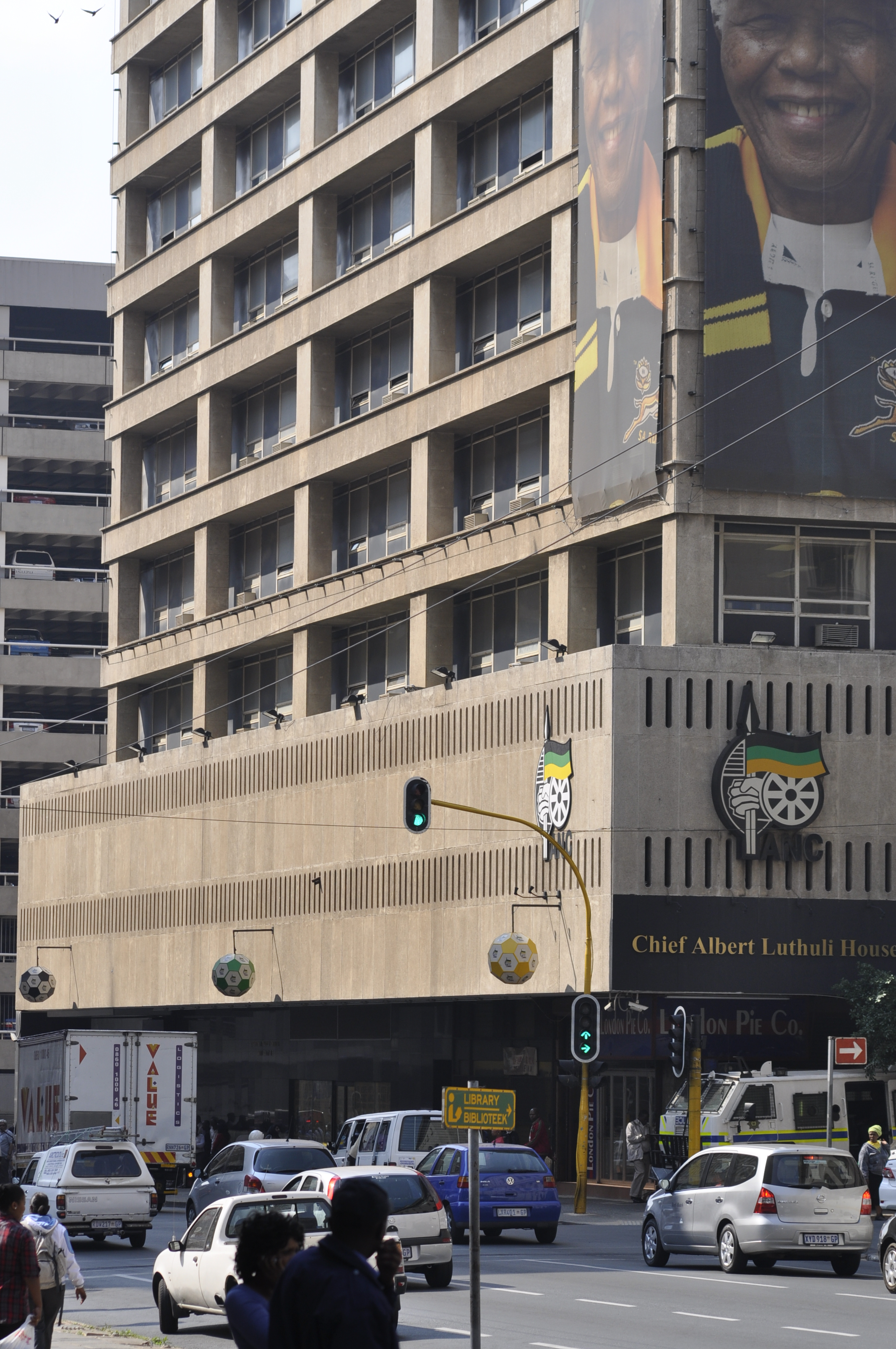
ANC headquarters at Luthuli House, where MKMVA members clashed with protesters.

In March 2012, the ANC Youth League reacted with vitriol to a statement of MKMVA's KwaZulu-Natal branch which expressed the view that, "If it was still the struggle era, Julius Malema would have been killed by the firing squad for the way in which he was rude to the ANC leadership". The Youth League said that the statement incited violence against Malema, a critic of Zuma who had recently been expelled from the ANC. In July of that year, Youth League members in Limpopo clashed violently with a group of what they called "hooligans... wearing MKMVA combat [gear]". The clashes took place outside a church where Zuma was speaking, and Youth League provincial leaders claimed that the assault had been planned in advance. In another example, in 2016, MKMVA members took it upon themselves to "provide security" to the ANC headquarters at Luthuli House, during a protest by young ANC members calling themselves the #OccupyLuthuliHouse movement. In attempting to block the protestors and media from Luthuli House, MKMVA members pushed, shoved, and verbally harassed them.

Maphatsoe said that Zuma had given MKMVA "battle orders" at the 2012 MKMVA national conference: "one of those orders was to protect the black, green and gold [ANC colours] at all costs. We are implementing those instructions by the president, at all times military veterans will be at the forefront of the defending the ANC and its leadership." The culmination of this trend was MKMVA's resolution, at its 2017 national conference, that its members should be permitted to guard the country's national key points. Siphiwe Nyanda said that the group presented itself, illegitimately, as a "private army", and R. W. Johnson described it as "a private army for hire".

==== Deployment to Nkandla ====
In February 2021, as Zuma defied a Constitutional Court order in failing to appear before the Zondo Commission, MKMVA members gathered outside Zuma's Nkandla homestead in KwaZulu-Natal, saying that they intended to protect Zuma from arrest. They also tried to prevent Bheki Cele, the South African Minister of Police, from entering the residence for a meeting with Zuma. Several dozen MKMVA members remained stationed there in March. Niehaus, MKMVA's spokesman, said that the attempt to force Zuma to testify to the commission was part of an "insidious factional political project" and warned that any attempt to arrest Zuma "will lead to massive instability, that will not be in the interest of our country". Frank Chikane described it as an unlawful gathering of a militia, saying "We are not talking about military veterans. There are no military veterans that will violate the law of any country". Blade Nzimande also characterised it as "militia" activity, and warned that, "No democracy can leave unattended the threats for a coup or civil war made from within such quarters".

On 29 June, Zuma – still holed up at Nkandla – was sentenced to 15 months' imprisonment for contempt of court, and given a week to hand himself in to the police. MKMVA – which had been ordered to disband the month before – again gathered outside the Nkandla homestead, and Niehaus said that they would "protect" Zuma, whom he described as MKMVA's "patron-in-chief", from arrest. Although Zuma handed himself over peacefully, there was large-scale civil unrest in KwaZulu-Natal the following week; Niehaus said, "What is happening is a vindication of what we warned would happen. We know there is a huge support base for Zuma which was going to be very angry because of this and that is exactly what is happening".

==== Xenophobic violence ====
Provincial branches of MKMVA in KwaZulu-Natal and Gauteng were reportedly involved in xenophobic violence. In September 2020, MKMVA groups in KwaZulu-Natal participated in what they touted as a "shutdown" of the province, involving protests – coordinated with other groups including truck and taxi drivers – whose demands included the deportation of foreigners. In November of that year, a group calling itself the MKMVA Freedom Fighters forcibly shut down foreign-owned businesses in and around the Workshop shopping centre in Durban, effectively evicting foreign traders from the area. Over subsequent months, sporadic attacks on migrant traders continued, with observers implicating apparent MKMVA members. On 8 March 2021, a series of attacks on Durban's Victoria Street saw foreign-owned shops vandalised and petrol bombed, and their owners assaulted. Witnesses said that the attacks were perpetrated by around ten men who purported to be MKMVA members, but the provincial chairperson of MKMVA said that the organisation was "not part of that and not endorsing that". The attacks led the New Frame to warn in an editorial of MKMVA's growing links to populist and violent xenophobic politics. In 2022, MKMVA members were frequently seen at marches organised by the xenophobic quasi-military Operation Dudula, and the Daily Maverick counted MKMVA as among the groups that provided the campaign with "muscle".

=== Alleged financial misconduct ===
In 2012, the Mail & Guardian reported that a forensic investigation – commissioned by a group of MK veterans within the mainstream ANC leadership – had found evidence that MKMVA leaders, including Maphatsoe, pilfered funds from MKMVA investment holdings to make personal payments. The investigation concerned two MKMVA bank accounts, which received a cumulative income of R12 million between October 2005 and June 2011; according to the investigation, top leaders had withdrawn R5.4 million over the same period, and in many cases had used the money to purchase personal luxuries. The report was the culmination of longstanding "suspicions of financial malfeasance", and was followed by a court battle when the implicated leaders were sued by other veterans. At least one veteran, Eddie Mokhoanatse, was expelled from MKMVA for his involvement in the lawsuit, which MKMVA said damaged the ANC's reputation.

=== Links to the Gupta family ===
During Zuma's presidency, when the notorious Gupta family was accused of attempting to capture the South African state, MKMVA leaders defended the Guptas, as well as Zuma, in the press; Maphatsoe in particular described the Guptas as "friends of MKMVA" and promised to defend them from attack, which he suggested was motivated by racism. This relationship led to suspicion of a basis in a dubious quid pro quo. In 2012, the Mail & Guardian reported that MKMVA had received shares in a Gupta-owned mining company, Shiva Uranium, through a stake in one of the mine's shareholders, Islandsite Investments, which was co-owned by Duduzane Zuma and Rajesh Gupta. Maphatsoe admitted that the Guptas had given MKMVA shares worth R250 million, "for the benefit of our members", but denied that any MKMVA leaders benefitted personally from the relationship. The so-called Gupta Leaks later confirmed that the transaction had taken place in 2011.

In 2017, amaBhungane reported that the Gupta Leaks also showed that the Gupta family had paid the R850,000 bill for MKMVA's 2010 national general council meeting in Johannesburg, including the price of the conference facilities, accommodation, food, and a gala dinner. Niehaus, a member of the MKMVA national executive, questioned the legitimacy of the leaks, but Maphatsoe acknowledged that the Guptas had paid for the conference by donation, saying, "It's not a crime to be assisted. It's not corruption there." The Daily Maverick said that MKMVA was "a direct beneficiary of state capture", and Mokhoanatse (by then expelled from MKMVA) alleged that MKMVA was "captured" by the Guptas and took instructions from them. The Gupta Leaks also suggested that MKMVA received media assistance from the Guptas' British public relations firm, Bell Pottinger; Maphatsoe himself referred often to "white monopoly capital", a slogan devised by Bell Pottinger.

== Prominent members ==
- Kebby Maphatsoe
- Carl Niehaus
- Des van Rooyen
- Ayanda Dlodlo
