= City Power =

Power utility, serving the City of Johannesburg

- Type: Electric utility
- Industry: Electric power industry
- Founded: 1 January 2001; 25 years ago
- Headquarters: 40 Heronmere Road, Reuven, Johannesburg, South Africa
- Area served: Johannesburg
- Key people: Tshifularo Mashava (CEO)
- Revenue: ▲ R 17 billion (2020/21)
- Total assets: ▲ R 19.7 billion (2019/20)
- Number of employees: 1750 (2020/21)
- Website: citypower.co.za

City Power Johannesburg (or Joburg City Power) is a state owned power utility, wholly owned by the City of Johannesburg. Its responsibilities include buying electricity from power producers and supplying it to the public, and installing and maintaining the electrical infrastructure in the City of Johannesburg. It supplies electricity to 3.2 million people in the Greater Johannesburg Metropolitan Area.

== History ==
Joburg City Power was established as a separate company from the City of Johannesburg on 1 January 2000. On 19 December 2001, the National Energy Regulator of South Africa (NERSA), granted City Power a licence to trade.

In 2022, it took over the electricity distribution functions from Eskom to Soweto and parts of Johannesburg, including Sandton, Orange Farm, Finetown, Ivory Park and Diepsloot; Eskom was previously responsible for supplying electricity to most parts of Johannesburg.

== Corruption ==
In 2013, a controversial R1.2 billion contract was awarded by the City of Johannesburg to Edison Power, a company owned by Vivian Reddy, a close ally of Jacob Zuma, for smart meters used by City Power customers. Edison Power was initially allocated a R600-million share of an R800-million contract. Subsequently, the contract value was revised to R1.25 billion and Edison Power received the exclusive contract. When its maintenance budget ran dry in 2025, it launched an investigation into the conduct of 15 employees and some contractors who were allegedly responsible for fraudulent invoicing, inflated prices for cleaning equipment, ineffectual maintenance and failed infrastructure projects.

In 2025, the Hawks raided City Power in an ongoing investigation concerning suspicious payments totalling half a billion rand. City Power executives approved 3 payments to contractors; one of which is under investigation by the Hawks.

== Load shedding ==
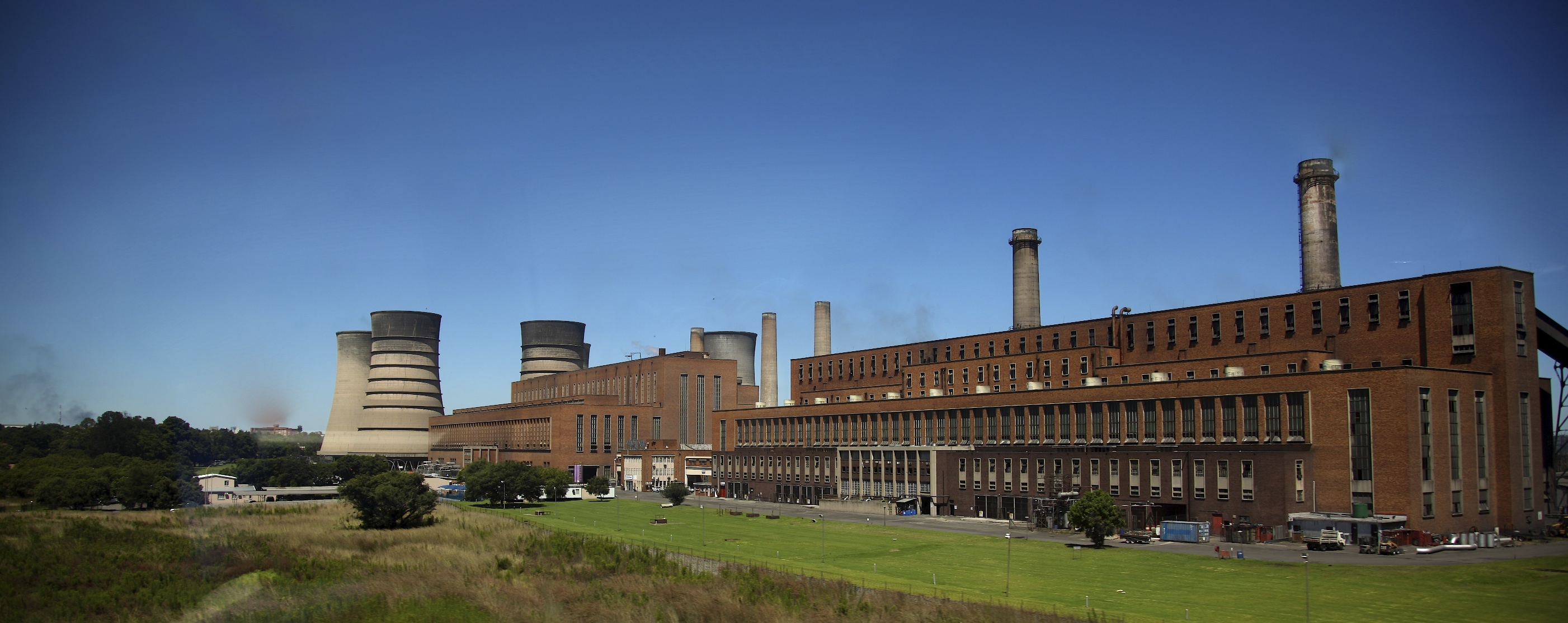
Kelvin Power Station, a coal-fired power station, provides the City Johannesburg 10% of its power.

City Power currently obtains 90% of its power from Eskom and 10% from the Kelvin Power Station from which it seeks to move away from.

In 2014, it announced that it will remotely switch off geysers "to reduce the impact of load shedding."

In 2021, it resolved to be an electricity generator to "reduce over-reliance on Eskom". In 2023, the City of Johannesburg along with City Power aimed to cut load shedding in Johannesburg by 3 stages through the use of smart meters and the recommissioning of two existing open cycle gas turbines. It also sought to secure power on a long-term basis from independent power producers (IPPs).

In 2023, City Power said it had to replace more than 390 mini-substations (pole-mounted transformers), at a cost of R200 million which constituted 80% of its budget for the year. The cause of this was load shedding, theft and vandalism.

In September 2023, City Power announced a drive that would replace all meters with smart meters before 24 November 2024. This was due to a limitation in all meters that generate a token ID using the Standard Transfer Specification. This change would also enable City Power to remotely limit electricity usage in households whose usage is higher than normal.

From 6 November 2023, City Power took over management of the load shedding schedule from Eskom.

From 10 June 2024, City Power implemented its own form of load shedding called load reduction.

=== Electricity procurement ===
In 2023, through grid access it aims to obtain 53MW from customer-embedded rooftop solar generation and 3.7MW from municipal building PV generation, for a total of 60MW.

By 2026/27, it hopes to target 480MW (with 200MW coming from households and businesses, 150MW from independent power producers on private and mining land, 50MW from financed rooftop IPP PV programmes, 27MW through municipal building PV generation, 33.5MW from landfill gas generation and solid waste-to-energy, and 20MW from natural gas generation.)

In July 2023, the City of Johannesburg introduced wheeling tariffs which charge both independent power producers and City Power customers to allow use of the existing grid infrastructure to supply customers with electricity.

In August 2023, City Power secured 92MW from four IPPs: waste-to-energy (20MW), gas-to-power (31MW) and PV solar generation (40.8MW).

In April 2024, the 50 MW John Ware Gas Turbine Power Station was recommissioned.

In September 2025, City Power announced it would invest R518.8 million into rolling out solar microgrids in 5 informal settlements; electricity losses from illegal connections amount to R4.5 billion.

== Regulations ==
=== Small-scale Embedded Generation ===
All private generation under 1 MVa (including residential plugin solar) require City Power's prior approval. The stringent 6-step requirement associated with this has faced objections by various role players who labelled registering residential solar setups as unnecessary administrative red tape; OUTA claims City Power's registration process introduces "avoidable costs, significant delays and additional administrative burdens".

== Revenue recuperation ==
City Power has endeavoured to collect R8.9 billion owed by businesses and households. It did this by first giving notices of disconnecting the power of delinquent parties, and compelling them to pay. It said it will impose penalties on businesses and residential complexes that have defaulted on their accounts and connected electricity illegally.

From 1 October 2026, City Power was ringfenced, where 30% of revenue collected by the City of Johannesburg is kept and 70% is passed on to City Power. Critics say this payment scheme is flawed as it would possibly lead to an increase in financial strain (by March 2026, City Power's overdraft with the city sat at R19.1 billion); the City as shareholder is paid first, with the remaining 70% revenue being inadequate to service its expenses.

=== Businesses ===
The Apartheid Museum was one of the disconnected clients, with it owing R1.8 million. The Gauteng Treasury was another, with it owing over R34 million. In February 2023, some of the disconnected clients were a shopping centre running an illegal connection on its meters and was penalised with a R100 000 fine, the Church of Scientology with R877 000 in arrears, a sports club in Bryanston which owed R2.3 million and the Nigerian consulate which owed R406 000.

In October 2023, it announced that it would give government entities Rahima Moosa Mother and Child Hospital and the Helen Joseph Hospital 14 days to settle a combined debt of R32 million.

In June 2024, Eskom issued an ultimatum to the City of Johannesburg (COJ) and City Power for electricity non payment. Joburg owes Eskom R3.4 billion. According to the record, last payments were made in October 2023. The Johannesburg High Court instructed the City of Johannesburg and City Power to immediately pay the first billion of their defaulting amount.

=== Residential customers ===
In September 2023, City Power conducted a disconnection drive of non-paying customers in Naturena and the Lenasia Service Delivery Centre (SDC) in an attempt to collect revenue; the Lenasia SDC which includes surrounding areas like Eldorado Park, Ennerdale, Zakariyya Park and Lehae, owed R 1.3 billion.

The City of Johannesburg, through City Power meters, began subtracting municipal debt owed by businesses and residential customers from prepaid electricity purchases.

From July 2024, City Power began deducting a R230 service charge from its prepaid customers; along with an increase in the electricity price per KWh, this saw a 23.15% increase from the previous year for all customers including indigent customers (6 to 12 times the inflation rate).

== See also ==
- Johannesburg City Parks
