= Kebby Maphatsoe =

South African politician (1962–2021)

Emmanuel Kebby Maphatsoe

Member of the National Assembly of South Africa
- In office 15 June 2019 – 31 August 2021
- In office 30 May 2009 – 7 May 2019

Personal details
- Born: 31 December 1962
- Died: 31 August 2021 (aged 58)

Emmanuel Kebby Maphatsoe (31 December 1962 – 31 August 2021) was a Member of the National Assembly of South Africa from 2019 until his death in 2021. He had previously served from May 2009 to May 2019, when he lost his seat, however he returned to the National Assembly after Jeff Radebe resigned his seat.

He was also president of the uMkhonto we Sizwe Military Veterans’ Association (MKMVA) until its disbandment in 2021.

Maphatsoe served as a Deputy Minister of Defence and Military Veterans in the cabinet of South African president Jacob Zuma from 2014 to 2019.

He was implicated in the current state capture probes and militarizing the MKMVA, most notably deploying 30+-year-old men outside Luthuli House who could not possibly be members of the MKMVA or have served in the ANC training camps throughout Southern Africa.

Maphatsoe died on 31 August 2021 at his Johannesburg home.

== See also ==
- African Commission on Human and Peoples' Rights
- Constitution of South Africa
- History of the African National Congress
- Politics in South Africa
- Provincial governments of South Africa
