= Shell House massacre =

1994 mass shooting at the African National Congress in Johannesburg, South Africa

- Part of the run-up to the 1994 South African general election
- Shell House (South Africa)
Date	28 March 1994; 32 years ago
Location	Shell House, Johannesburg, South Africa 26.19920°S 28.04641°E
Result	Amnesty granted to 11 people

Casualties and losses
- 19–53 dead

The Shell House massacre was a 1994 shooting incident that took place at Shell House, the headquarters of the African National Congress (ANC), in central Johannesburg, South Africa in the lead up to the 1994 elections.

== Description ==
Shell House (not to be confused with Luthuli House, where the ANC later relocated) at 51 Plein Street, Johannesburg, South Africa was the headquarters of the ANC after the organisation was unbanned until 1997. On 28 March 1994, about 20,000 Inkatha Freedom Party (IFP) supporters marched to Shell House in protest against the 1994 elections that the IFP was intending to boycott.

ANC security guards opened fire, killing nineteen people. At the time, guards claimed that the IFP supporters were storming the building or that a tip-off had been received of that being planned.

The Nugent Commission of Inquiry into the killings rejected that explanation. The commission's conclusion was that the shooting by ANC guards was unjustified.

The incident reflected the rising tensions between the ANC and IFP, which had begun in the 1980s in KwaZulu-Natal and had then spread to other provinces in the 1990s. The IFP claimed that the ANC was intent on undermining traditional authorities and the power of Zulu chiefs; the ANC saw a power struggle as the demise of apartheid was finalised.

== Aftermath ==
The incident triggered a state of emergency across eleven magisterial districts in the East Rand, as well as the whole of the KwaZulu and Natal province.

In June 1995, ANC and then President Nelson Mandela admitted that he had given the order to defend Shell House, even if it should require killing people. In 1995 Willem Ratte laid a complaint of murder against president Nelson Mandela at the police headquarters in Pretoria for the Shell House massacre.

The Truth and Reconciliation Commission granted amnesty to 11 people concerning the massacre.

== See also ==
- List of massacres in South Africa
