= Pretoria Forts =

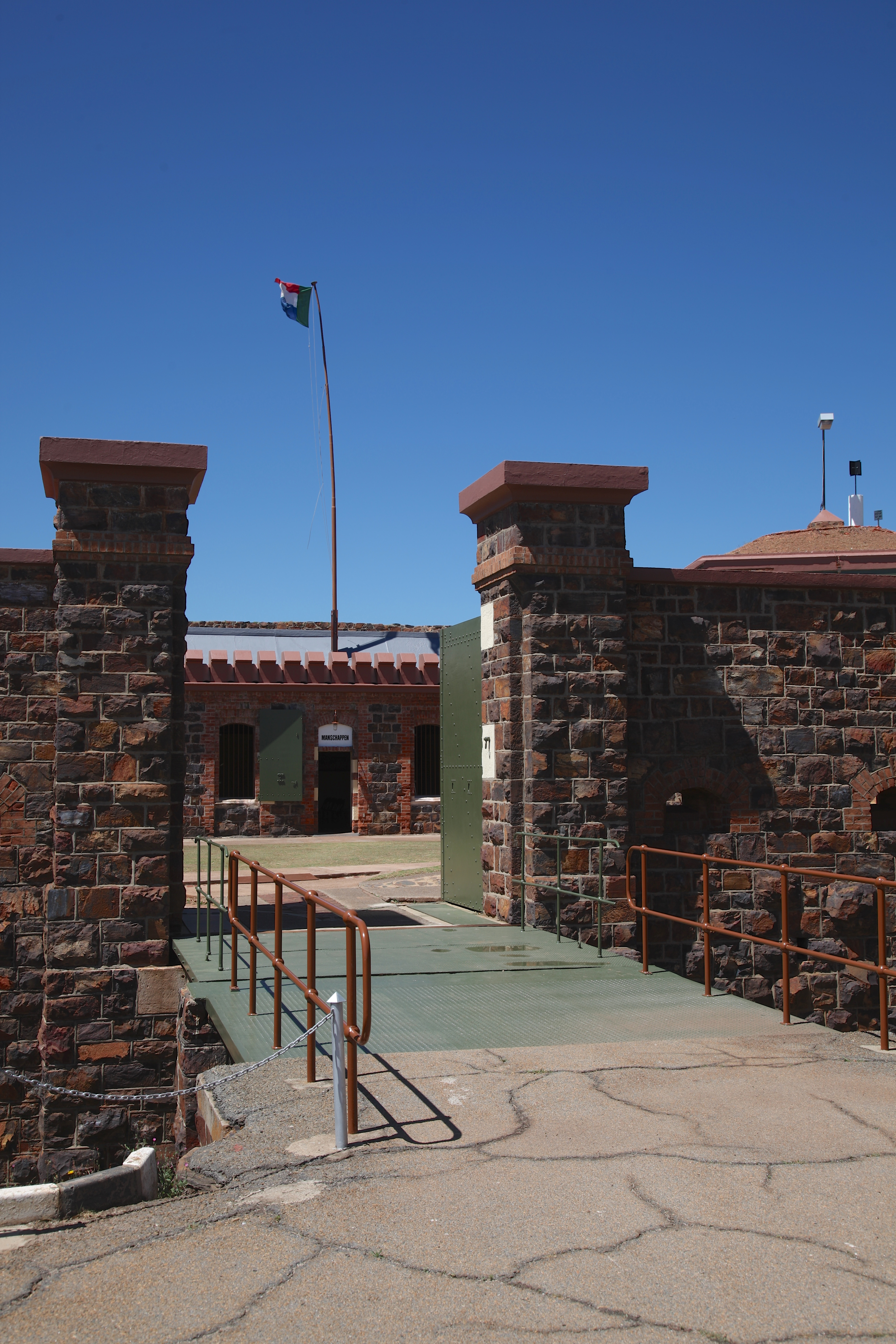
Fort Klapperkop main entrance and dry-moat with the flag of the Transvaal above the battlements.

The Pretoria Forts consists of four forts built by the government of the South African Republic (ZAR) just before the outbreak of the Second Anglo-Boer War around their capital of Pretoria.

== History ==
After the abortive Jameson Raid, the government of the ZAR became concerned about the safety of its capital city, Pretoria, both from foreign invasion as well as from the growing number of uitlanders ('foreigners') on the Witwatersrand. Consequently, a defence plan for Pretoria was drawn up by a former French artillery officer, Léon Grunberg. This plan was approved on 24 March 1896 by the Executive Council of the ZAR.

The plan recommended that eight strategic positions around the city should be fortified by means of armoured turrets equipped with artillery. The positions identified were Schanskop, Kwaggaspoort, Daspoortrand, Magaliesberg-wes, Wonderboompoort, Derdepoort, Strubenkop and Klapperkop. The armoured turrets were subsequently found to be unacceptable, and thus the plan of two German engineers, Otto Albert Adolph von Dewitz and Heinrich C Werner to build forts instead, was accepted. However, due to a lack of money, only four forts were eventually built.

== The three German forts ==
Fort Schanskop, Fort Wonderboompoort and Fort Klapperkop were designed by Von Dewitz and Werner of the German engineering company Krupp, assisted by architect Christiaan Kuntz and building contractor Celso Giri.

The three forts are pentagonal reinforced, with more fire range possibilities through numerous facets. Attacks from any direction could be warded off by revolving guns on their ramparts. To prevent infantry attacks, loopholes were built into the walls. Trenches, barbed-wire entanglements and fortified rooms were erected as reinforcements.

These forts were the most modern structures of their time and modern mediums of communication, such as telephones, were used to equip the telegraph room.

Many black labourers and about 400 white builders, mostly Italians, were involved in the building of these forts. To address technical aspects such as the electrical connections between forts, German and Dutch experts were consulted.

=== Fort Schanskop ===
Fort Schanskop
- Pretoria, South Africa
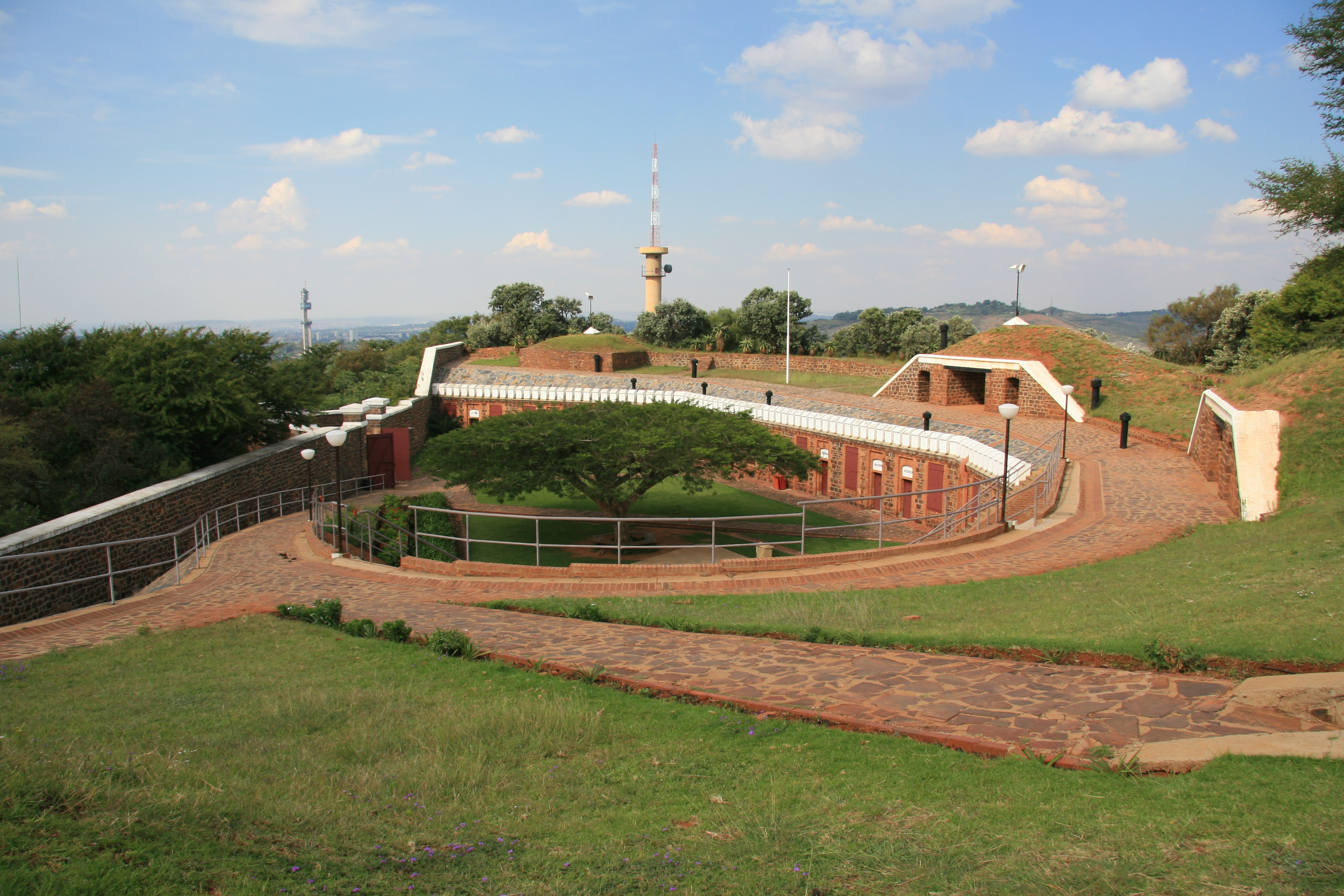
- Fort Schanskop viewed from above

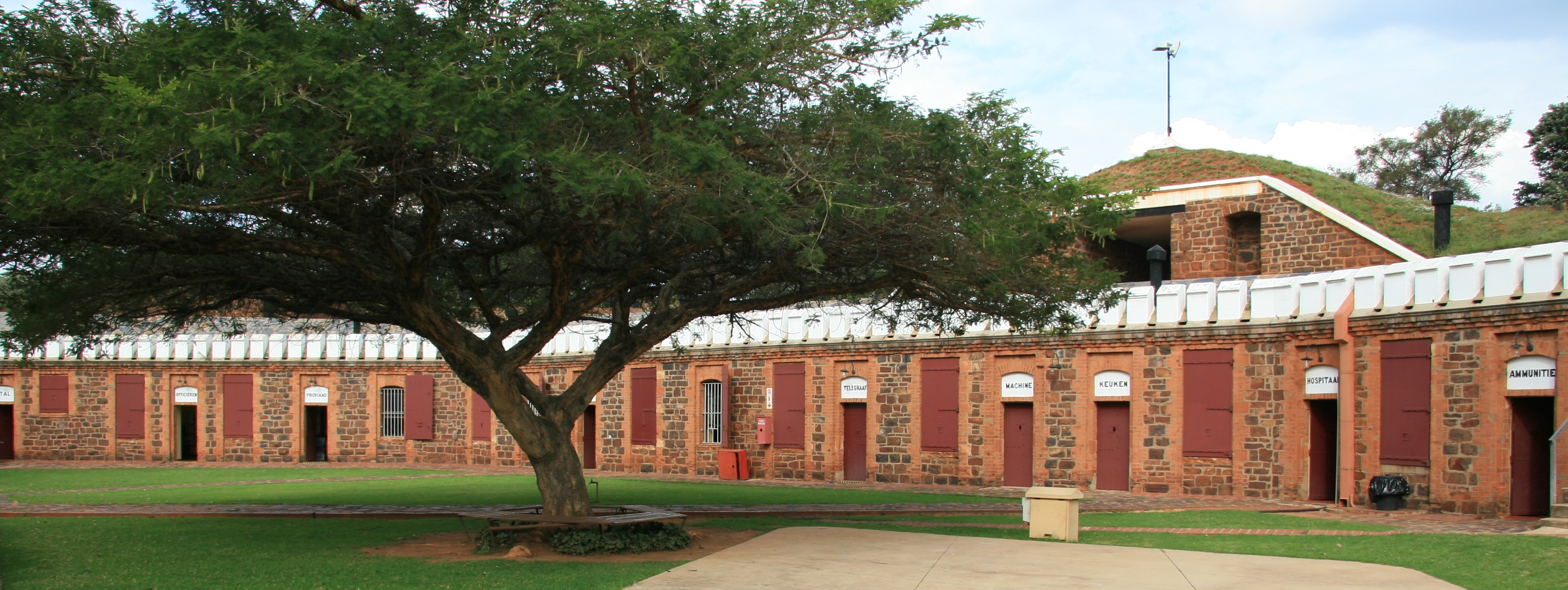
- Fort Schanskop

Site information
- Controlled by: South Africa
- Open to the public: Yes
- Condition: Renovated

Location
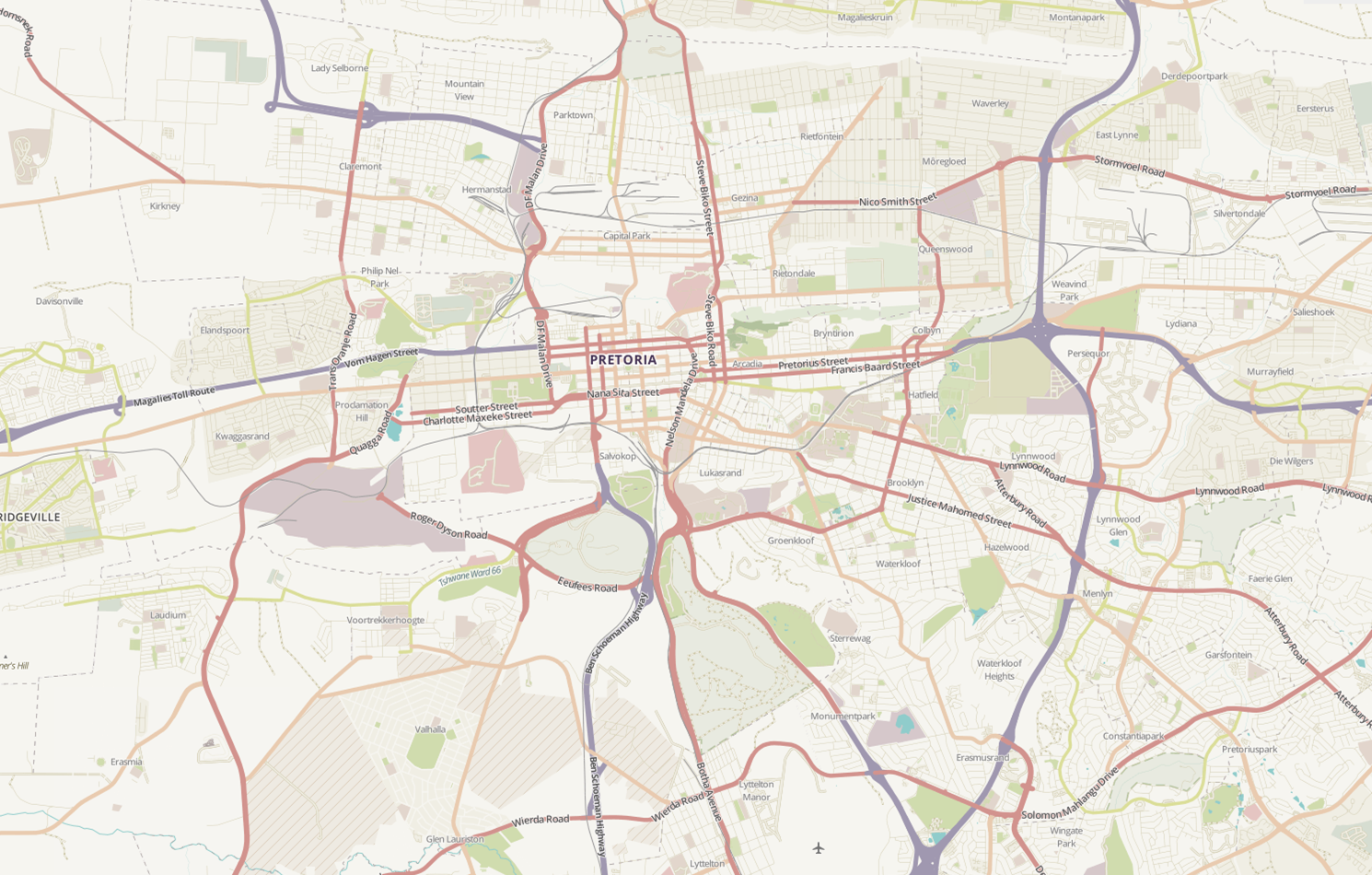
- Location within Pretoria
- Coordinates: 25°46′39″S 28°11′06″E

Site history
- Built: 1896 6 April 1897
- Built by: Friedrich Krupp AG
- Events: Second Boer War

Garrison information
- Past commanders: Lieutenant A. Carlblom (South African Republic)
- Garrison: Rijdende Artillerie, later Corps Vesting Artillerie
- Occupants: 31

This fort was built at a cost of GBP £47,500. It was handed over to the government on 6 April 1897. It was supplied with a paraffin engine powered generator for electricity, electrical lighting and a search light. A telephone and telegraphic links were also installed. Water was supplied from a pump station in the Fountains Valley which was shared with the nearby Fort Klapperkop.

The garrison was initially armed with one officer and 30 men and was armed with 37 mm Maxim-Nordenfeldt cannon, Martini-Henry hand-cranked Maxim machine guns and a 155 mm Creusot gun (also known colloquially as a "Long Tom"). By October 1899, only 17 men were still stationed at the fort.

Both the garrison and the armaments were gradually reduced during the course of the Second Anglo-Boer war until there was only one man and no guns left over on 5 June 1900, the day on which British forces occupied Pretoria. The fort was briefly occupied in 1993 by Willem Ratte to protest the multi-racial government of South Africa at the cost of Boer and Afrikaner heritage.

The fort was acquired by the Voortrekker Monument complex in June 2000. A refurbished statue of Danie Theron, originally from the Danie Theron Combat School in Kimberley, was placed on the perimeter of the fort and unveiled on 6 March 2002. A scale model replica of the Trek Monument that was inaugurated on 16 December 1954 in Tanzania (then known as Tanganyika) is also situated on the perimeter of the fort.

Fort Schanskop is a Gauteng Provincial Heritage Site and a provincial heritage site.

The Pro Patria Museum is a non-profit military history museum located at Fort Schanskop within the Voortrekkermonument nature reserve in Pretoria, South Africa. Established in January 2022, the museum aims to honour, recognise, and preserve the heritage and historical role of the South African Security Forces, particularly during the period of the Border War and related regional conflicts from 1966 to 1989. Its core mission involves educating current and future generations about this era of South African history, providing a dedicated space and community home for military veterans and their descendants, and functioning as a center for military tourism and research. The museum's exhibitions display a wide array of well-preserved historical artefacts, personal memorabilia, and specialised thematic rooms established in collaboration with various veterans' associations. Entrance is free to the Museum and donations are welcome, as no Government funding is received for preserving this important part of SA military heritage. https://www.propatriamuseum.org.za

The Fort transforms as thousands of music fans gather there for an outdoor music festival at the end of every month. Park Acoustics changes its lineup every month and features a wide range of South African acts.

=== Fort Wonderboompoort ===
Fort Wonderboompoort
- Pretoria, South Africa
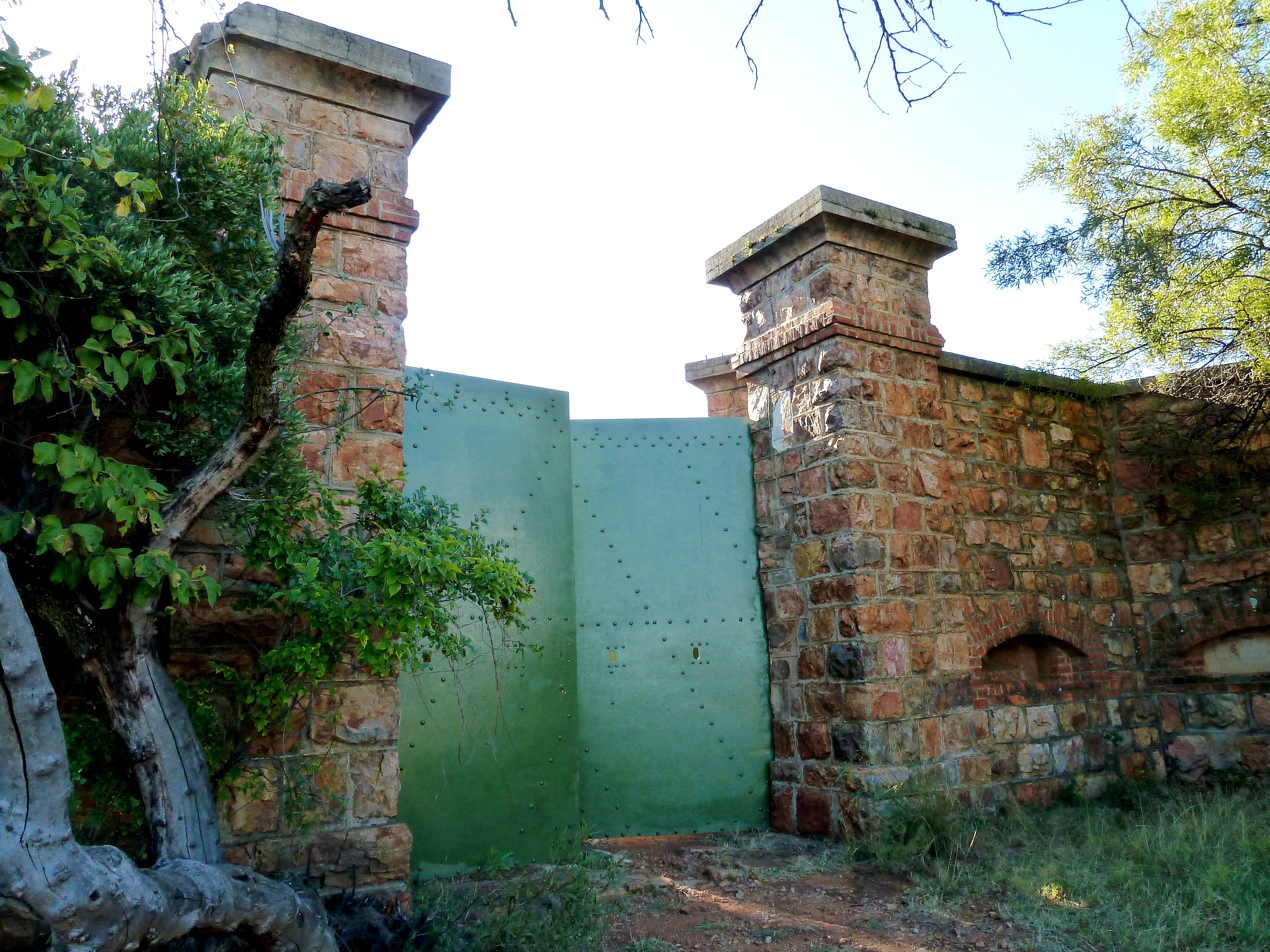
- Outer gate of Fort Wonderboompoort

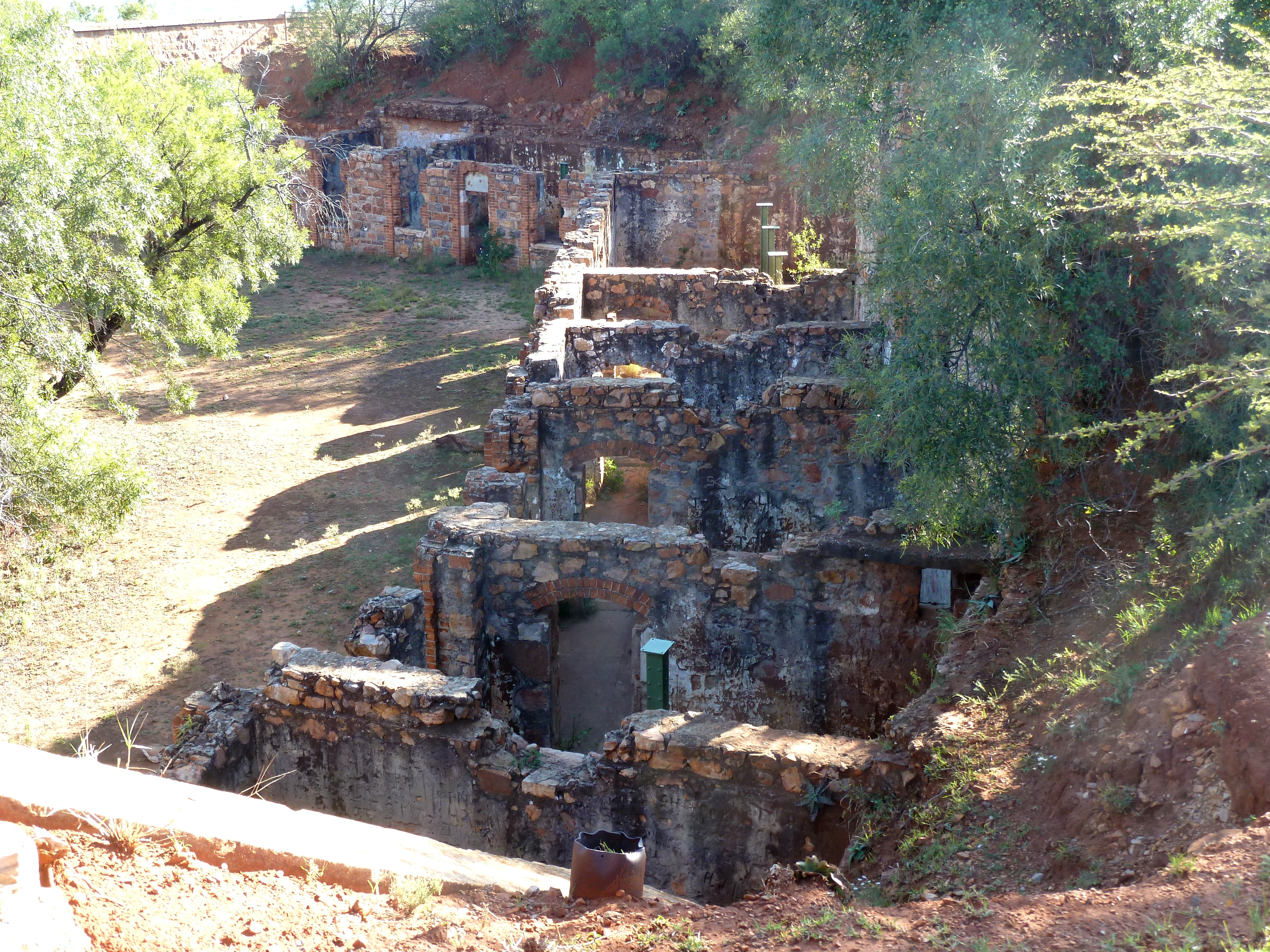
- Ruins of Fort Wonderboompoort

Site information
- Controlled by: South Africa
- Open to the public: Yes
- Condition: Derelict

Location
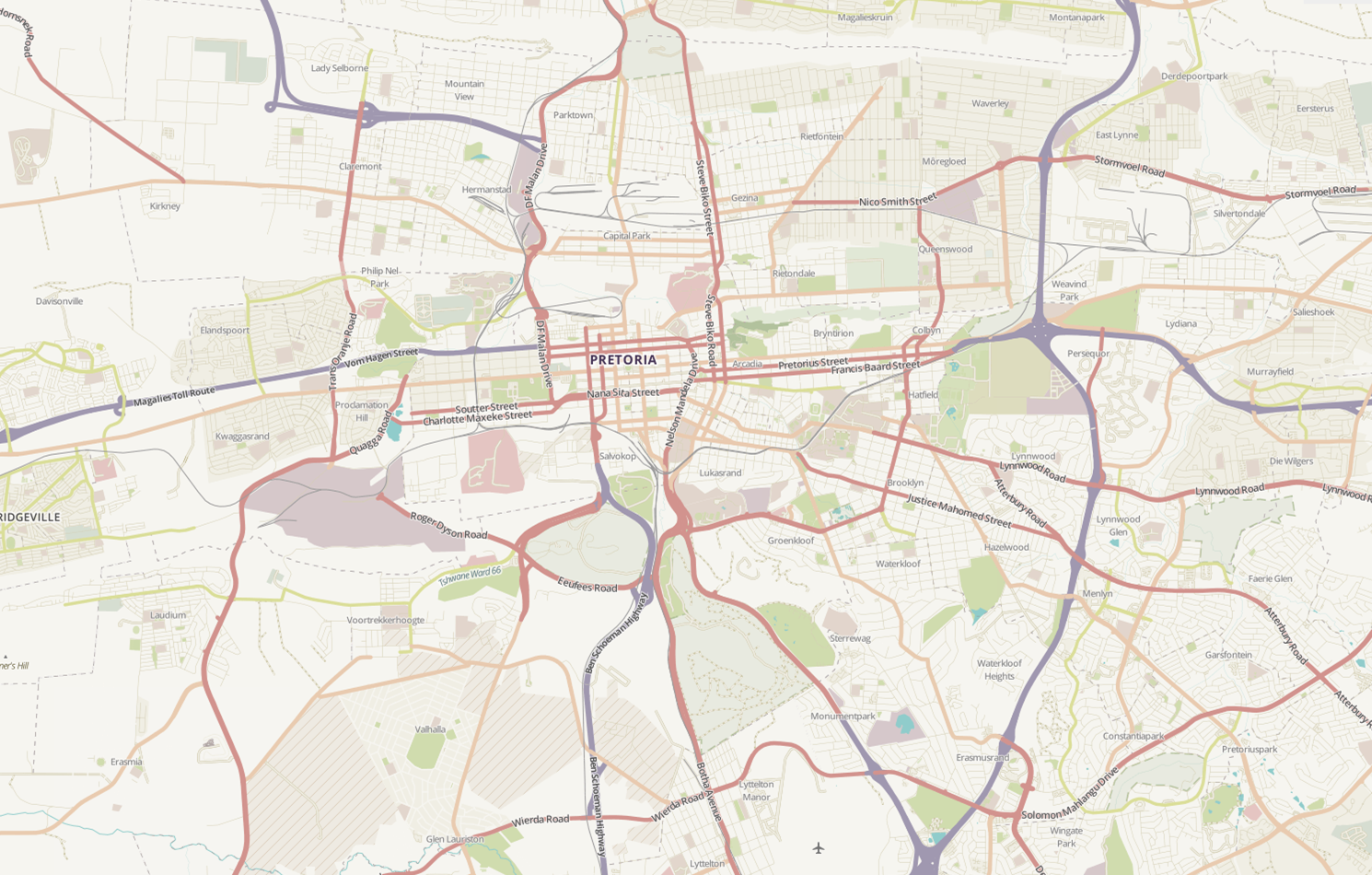
- Location within Pretoria
- Coordinates: 25°41′32″S 28°11′39″E

Site history
- Built: 4 September 1897
- Built by: Friedrich Krupp AG
- Events: Second Boer War

Garrison information
- Past commanders: Lieutenant J. Wolmarans (South African Republic)
- Garrison: Rijdende Artillerie, later Corps Vesting Artillerie
- Occupants: ±30

This fort was completed in September 1897 by Von Dewitz and Werner for a total cost of GBP £49,000. As with Fort Schanskop, it was also supplied with electricity, a telephone and running water.

The fort was armed with a 75 mm Creusot gun ("Long Tom"), a 37 mm Maxim-Nordenfeldt cannon and a hand-cranked Martin-Henry Maxim. Initially eighteen gunners were stationed in the fort, but both men and armaments were gradually withdrawn until only one gunner and no cannons were left on 5 June 1900.

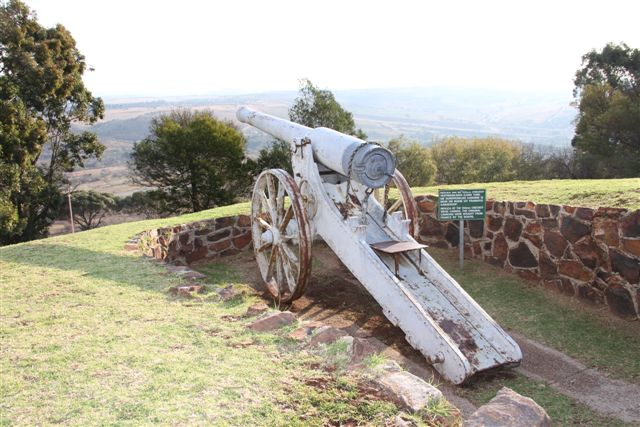
Long Tom replica at Fort Klapperkop

=== Fort Klapperkop ===
Fort Klapperkop
- Pretoria, South Africa
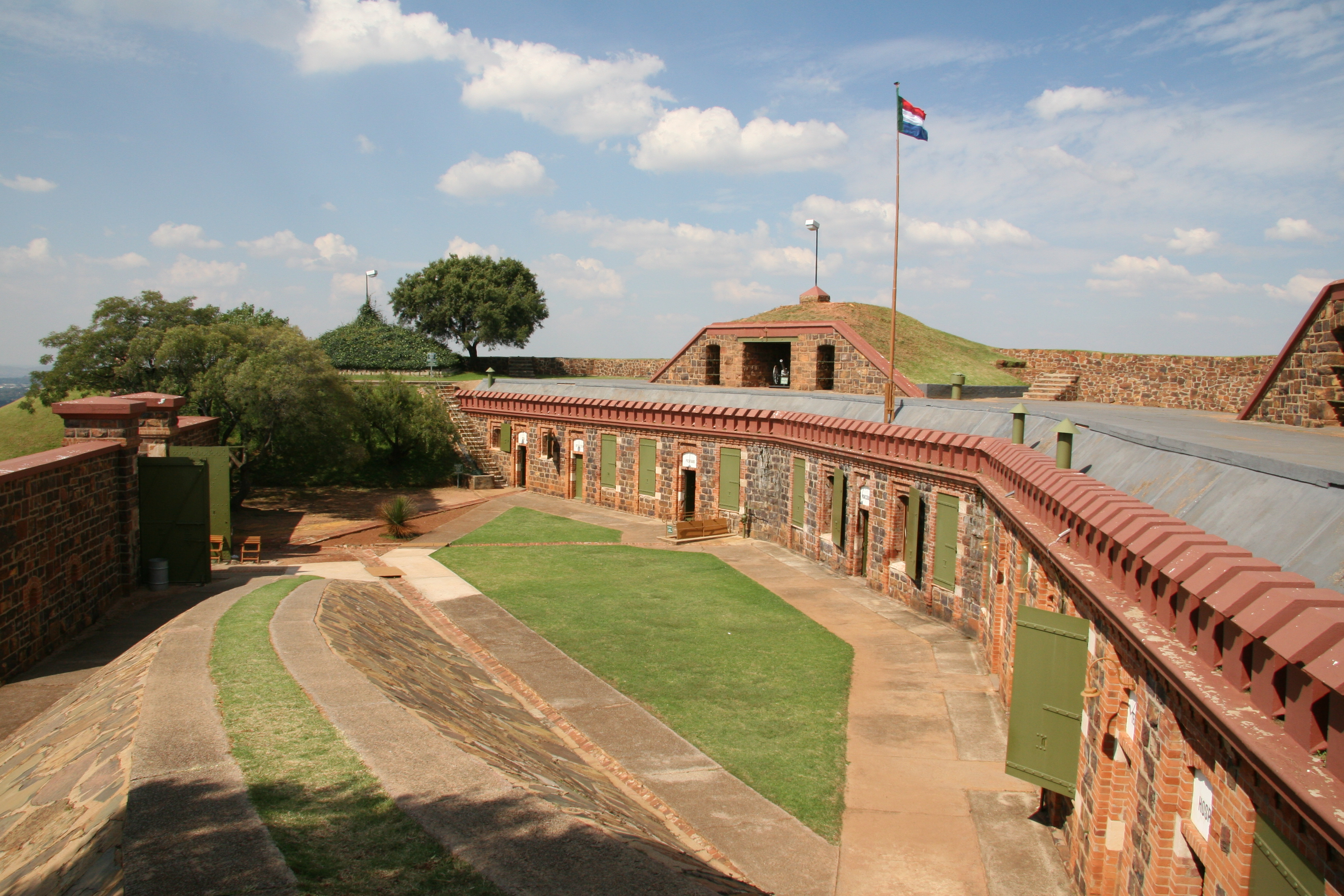
- Fort Klapperkop

Site information
- Controlled by: South Africa
- Open to the public: Yes
- Condition: Renovated

Location
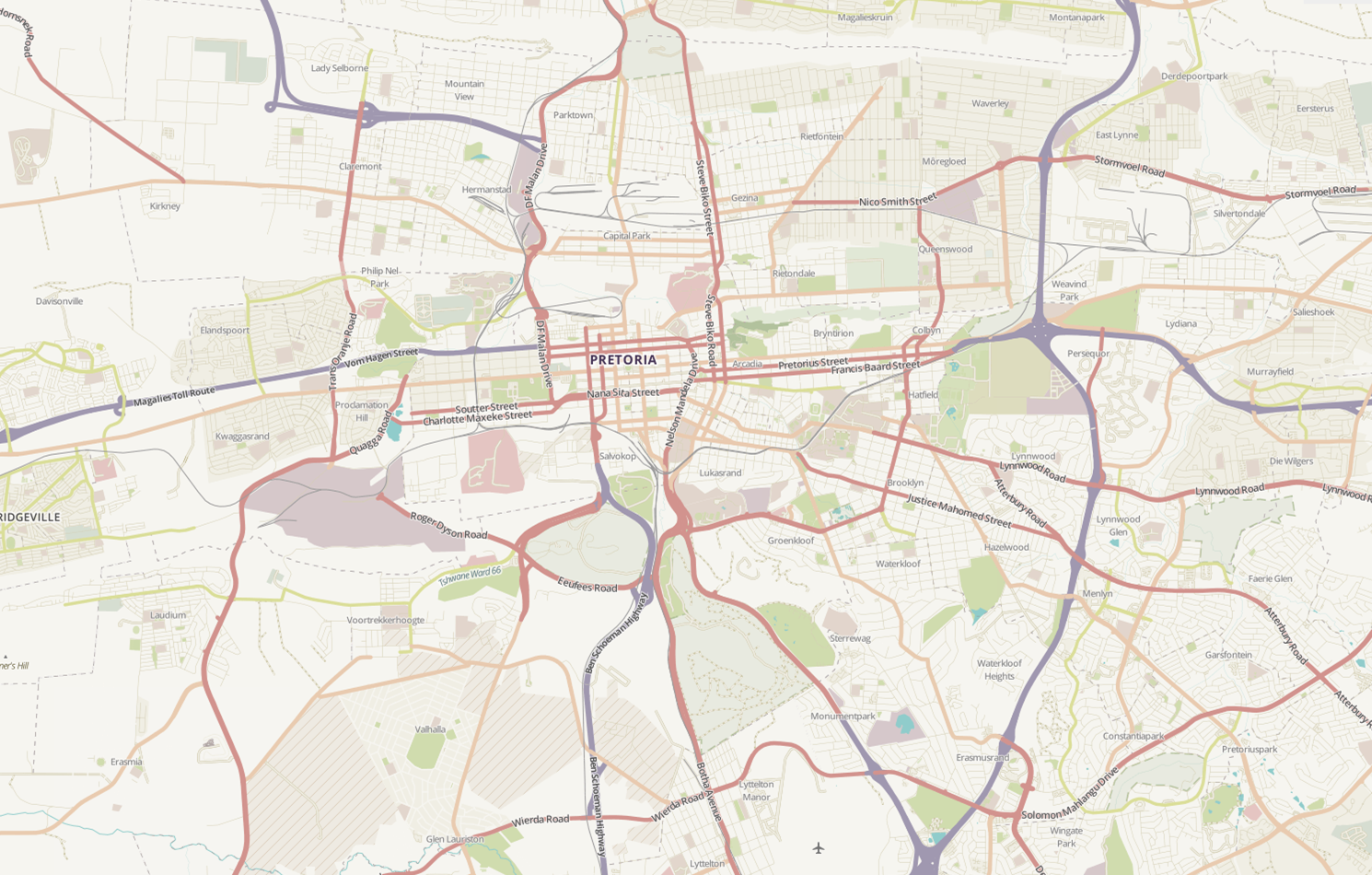
- Location within Pretoria
- Coordinates: 25°46′49″S 28°12′36″E

Site history
- Built: 1896 18 January 1898
- Built by: Friedrich Krupp AG
- Events: Second Boer War

Garrison information
- Past commanders: Adjutant A.S.D. Erasmus (South African Republic)
- Garrison: Rijdende Artillerie, later Corps Vesting Artillerie
- Occupants: 17–30

Klapperkop, the name of the hill where the fort is located is derived from the Afrikaans name for Strychnos pungens, a tree that grows indigenously on the hills in the region.

This fort was constructed at a total cost of GBP £50,000. It was handed over to the Government on 18 January 1898. It was supplied with a paraffin engine powered generator for electricity, a telephone and telegraphic links. Running water was supplied from a pump station in the Fountains Valley which was shared with the nearby Fort Schanskop.

Unlike the other forts in the surrounding area, the design incorporated a moat as well as a drawbridge. The moat was never filled with water.

Fort Klapperkop was armed with a 155mm Creusot gun ("Long Tom"), a 37 mm Maxim-Nordenfeldt cannon, three Martini-Henry hand-maxims and a 65 mm Krupp Mountain Gun.

In January 1899 the fort was manned by 17 troops. In July 1899 the number of troops was increased to 30. By the end of October 1899, only 16 troops were still stationed at Fort Klapperkop. As with the other forts, men and armament were gradually withdrawn and sent elsewhere during the course of the war.

It is said: "Never a shot in anger was fired from this fort."

The area was declared a military museum. On 31 May 1979, the South African Defence Force Memorial was unveiled at Fort Klapperkop. It includes a statue of a soldier holding a R1 rifle, in memory of all members of the South African Defence Force who died serving their country. The individuals who died are honoured with an inscription on a number of marble plaques mounted around the statue. Members who have died in operations as a result of enemy action are indicated with an asterisk (*) next to their names.

Fort Klapperkop is a Gauteng provincial heritage site.

== The French Fort ==
Fort Daspoortrand
- Pretoria, South Africa
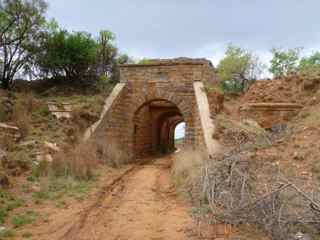
- The main entrance of Fort Daspoortrand

Site information
- Owner: Private
- Controlled by: South Africa
- Open to the public: No
- Condition: Ruined

Location
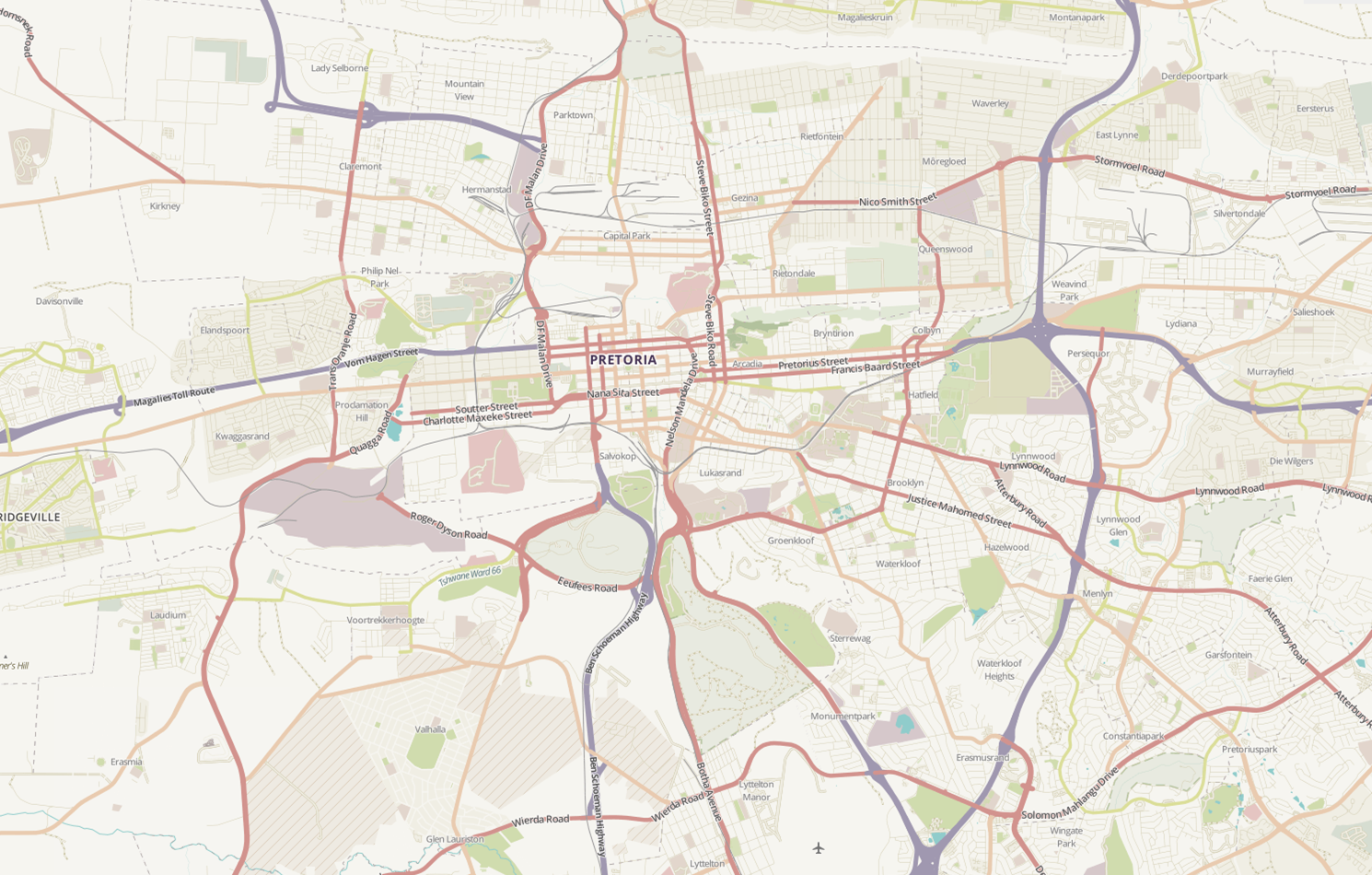
- Location within Pretoria
- Coordinates: 25.733038°S 28.076689°E

Site history
- Built: 1896 November 1898
- Built by: Léon Grunberg and Sam Léon
- Events: Second Boer War

Garrison information
- Past commanders: (South African Republic)
- Garrison: Transvaal Staatsartillerie

Unlike the other forts, Fort Daspoortrand a.k.a. Westfort was built by Léon Grunberg and Sam Léon. It thus differed from the other forts, being hexagonal instead of pentagonal and also markedly bigger. It was completed in November 1898 at a cost of GBP £46,500. Like the other forts, it had electricity, a telephone and running water. The fort was restored between 2005 and 2007 with the help of CHAM volunteers.

Fort Daspoortrand was initially manned by twenty-five gunners and was armed with a 155mm Creusot gun ("Long Tom") and two 37 mm Maxim-Nordenfeldt cannons. As with the other forts, only one soldier and no guns were in the fort on 5 June 1900.

== British occupation of Pretoria ==
The forts around Pretoria were systematically disarmed long before the British forces occupied Pretoria, as both men and artillery were needed in the field.

Both Fort Klapperkop and Fort Schanskop were fired upon on 3 June 1900 by British artillery, but the fire wasn't returned and Pretoria was occupied without resistance on 5 June 1900. The forts thus never fulfilled their intended role in the defence of Pretoria. The British forces subsequently armed and manned the forts. Other smaller fortifications were also erected by them to strengthen Pretoria's defences.

== The forts after the war ==
After the war Fort Klapperkop and Fort Schanskop continued to be used for military purposes, but were neglected. On 8 July 1938 the two forts were declared provincial heritage sites. Fort Klapperkop was restored in 1966 and converted to a military museum and Fort Schanskop followed in 1978.

Initially there were plans to convert Fort Wonderboompoort and Fort Daspoortrand into prisons but these were never carried out. The roofs of both forts were later demolished; it was speculated that General Jan Smuts gave the orders for this during World War II, but this has never been proven.

The ownership of Fort Wonderboompoort was transferred to the City Council of Pretoria in 1954. In 1986 it was cleaned up and partially restored; it was declared a provincial heritage site the following year. A request to declare Fort Daspoortrand a heritage site as well was submitted in 1988 but this has not been approved as yet.

Fort Daspoortrand turned into a leper colony and was eventually abandoned and currently stands ruined on the outskirts of Pretoria.

== See also ==
- List of Castles and Fortifications in South Africa
