= Sam Ntuli =

South African activist and trade unionist (1960–1991)

Sam Ntuli OMBS
- Born: 20 October 1960
- Died: 29 September 1991 (aged 30); Khumalo Street, Thokoza; Transvaal, South Africa
- Cause of death: Assassination
- Organization(s): Civic Association of Southern Transvaal; National Union of Metalworkers of South Africa
- Political party: African National Congress

Samuel Hambokwakhe "Fuba" Ntuli OMBS (known as Sam Ntuli; 20 October 1960 – 29 September 1991) was a South African trade unionist and anti-apartheid activist who was assassinated in Thokoza on 29 September 1991. A prominent community organiser on the East Rand, he was the general secretary of the Civic Association of Southern Transvaal (CAST) and regional secretary of the National Union of Metalworkers of South Africa (Numsa).

Ntuli's death severely inflamed tensions between supporters of the African National Congress (ANC) and rival Inkatha Freedom Party (IFP). However, the Truth and Reconciliation Commission later ruled that Ntuli's death was less an act of political violence than an incident of taxi violence: it dismissed the suggestion that IFP leaders had ordered Ntuli's assassination, concluding instead that he had probably been targeted by minibus-taxi operators in the region who resented him because his political organising harmed their business interests.

== Career and activism ==
Ntuli rose to prominence as an organiser in anti-apartheid civic associations on the East Rand. With Enoch Godongwana, he was involved in the establishment of the East Rand People's Organisation (Erapo) in 1979, and he later became its chairperson. He also became involved in union organising as a shop steward and organiser for the Metal and Allied Workers' Union (MAWU). After Ntuli, Godongwana, and two other leaders were expelled from MAWU in June 1984 after a period of in-fighting, he became associated with the United Metal, Mining and Allied Workers' Union of South Africa, a new breakaway union founded in July and affiliated to the United Democratic Front.

By 1991, Ntuli was general secretary of CAST, an umbrella grouping for anti-apartheid civic associations, which, at the time of Ntuli's death, was preparing for the launch of the South African National Civics Organisation. He was also the regional secretary of Numsa in the Witwatersrand region, as well as a member of the ANC and South African Communist Party. After the National Peace Accord was signed in September 1991, Ntuli was centrally involved in peace talks with the ANC's rival, the IFP; the accord's implementation in the Thokoza area had been complicated by a massacre of IFP supporters on 8 September.

== Assassination ==
On the morning of 29 September 1991, Ntuli was shot dead while driving his Toyota Corolla down Khumalo Street near his home in Thokoza. Witnesses said that the assailants, in a blue Toyota Cressida, had followed Ntuli's car and attempted to force it off the road; when he stopped, they fired twelve shots at him while driving past.

Chris Dlamini, another CAST leader, told the press that the killing may have been a deliberate attempt to "create a climate of violence" in Thokoza, given Ntuli's ongoing peace initiatives with the IFP. The attack vastly heightened political tensions in the area.

=== Funeral ===
On 7 October, as 12,000 mourners left Ntuli's funeral, unidentified gunmen opened fire, killing about twenty people and injuring several others. The funeral massacre magnified the scale of the tensions to a national level, as the ANC's Nelson Mandela characterised it as an organised paramilitary attack and accused President F. W. de Klerk of having "let loose his hounds against the people". Other observers accused the South African Police, who were present in large numbers, of failing to prevent the attack and even of firing on the mourners themselves.

=== Truth and Reconciliation Commission ===
The Truth and Reconciliation Commission conducted inquiries into Ntuli's assassination and related acts of political violence. During the hearings, two men, Themba Zimu and Thulani Tsotetsi (alias Themba Mlaba), testified about their involvement in the killing. Zimu and Mlaba were members of Thokoza's notorious Khumalo gang, led by Reverend Mbhekisini Khumalo, but Mlaba said that the order to kill Ntuli had come from senior IFP leaders. Abraham Mzizi, Gertrude Mzizi, and Themba Khoza were among those implicated in planning the attack.

The commission did not assign responsibility for Ntuli's death in its final report, because related hearings were still ongoing. However, in 2000, the commission declined to grant Zimu and Tsotetsi amnesty for their role in the assassination, finding that "mercenary considerations", rather than political objectives, were probably their primary motive. The commission pointed out that Gertrude Mzizi had testified that Ntuli was on good terms with the IFP leadership and was perceived as a peacemaker. Although it granted that Ntuli had been targeted because of his role in organising go-slows and strikes on the East Rand, the commission concluded that his killers objected to those activities primarily because they harmed the revenues of taxi operators in the area:

the complaint against Sam Ntuli came from the people who operated the taxis because his activities caused them to lose money... the pecuniary interests of some taxi owners or business people were the main reason for the assassination of Mr Ntuli although indirectly his political association was the basis for his actions which negatively affected some businessmen.

== Honours ==
Ntuli is commemorated at a peace monument on Khumalo Street, which is nearby his namesake, the Sam Ntuli Stadium (formerly Thokoza Stadium). His gravesite at Schoeman Cemetery in Thokoza was declared a heritage site by the government in June 2014. All three locations have frequently hosted memorial events for Ntuli. In September 2019, the Ekurhuleni Metropolitan Municipality additionally resolved to rename Kliprivier Road in his memory.

In May 2016, President Jacob Zuma admitted Ntuli to the Order of Mendi for Bravery posthumously, granting him the Order of Mendi for Bravery in silver for "his excellent contribution to peace-building during a particularly violent and delicate time in the history of the liberation struggle".

== Personal life ==
Ntuli was married to Leah Mokoena. His brother, Dumisa Ntuli, was also a community activist on the East Rand and served as a spokesperson for the ANC and for Numsa after the end of apartheid.
