= Abraham Mzizi =

South African politician (born 1940)

Delegate to the National Council of Provinces

Assembly Member for Gauteng
- In office April 2004 – May 2009

Member of the KwaZulu-Natal Legislature
- In office March 2003 – April 2004

Member of the National Assembly
- In office May 1994 – March 2003

Personal details
- Born: Madala Abram Mzizi; 22 April 1940
- Died: 1 February 2024 (aged 83)
- Citizenship: South Africa
- Party: Inkatha Freedom Party
- Spouse: Gertrude Mzizi

Madala Abram Mzizi (born 22 April 1940), commonly spelled Abraham Mzizi, was a South African politician from Gauteng. He represented the Inkatha Freedom Party (IFP) in the National Assembly from 1994 to 2003, in the KwaZulu-Natal Provincial Legislature from 2003 to 2004, and in the National Council of Provinces from 2004 to 2009. He rose to prominence during apartheid as an IFP activist on the East Rand.

== Career in Thokoza ==
Born on 22 April 1940, Mzizi represented the IFP as a local councillor in Thokoza, a black township in the former Transvaal, during apartheid. In the late 1980s and early 1990s, the township was a central venue for political violence between IFP supporters and supporters of the rival African National Congress (ANC). Mzizi's own home was burned down in a petrol-bomb attack in December 1990. During the Truth and Reconciliation Commission, a local activist, Themba Xaba, applied for amnesty for his role in the attack, which he said had been planned by a local self-defence unit. Xaba told the commission that Mzizi had been targeted because he brought hardship and misery to the township's residents, who he said would have celebrated if Mzizi had been killed in the bombing.

During later commission hearings, members of a different self-defence unit – this one aligned to the IFP – implicated Mzizi in the 1991 assassination of ANC supporter Sam Ntuli. The witnesses said that Mzizi had been involved in planning the murder, with some meetings held at Mzizi's home. Mzizi denied the allegation.

== Post-apartheid political career ==
In South Africa's first post-apartheid elections in 1994, Mzizi was elected to represent the IFP in the National Assembly. He served two terms, gaining re-election in 1999.

In March 2003, Mzizi resigned from the National Assembly in order to fill an IFP seat in the KwaZulu-Natal Provincial Legislature. In the next general election in 2004, the Gauteng Provincial Legislature elected him as one of its six permanent delegates to the National Council of Provinces, where he served a single term.

== Personal life ==
He was married to Gertrude Mzizi, who was also active in the IFP during apartheid and who later served as a member of the Gauteng Provincial Legislature. They both have 4 children. He died peacefully in his old age surrounded by his wife, children, and grandchildren on 1 February 2024.
