= Willem Ratte =

South African soldier (born 1948)

Lieutenant Colonel Wilhelm Friedrich Ratte
- Born: 14 February 1948 (age 78); Paarl, South Africa
- Military career
- Allegiance: Rhodesia; South Africa
- Branch: Rhodesian Army; South African Army
- Service years: (Rhodesia) 1973–1978; (South Africa) 1979–1991
- Rank: Lieutenant colonel
- Commands: 32 Battalion Reconnaissance
- Conflicts: Rhodesian Bush War; South African Border War
- Awards: Rhodesian SAS Wings on Chest

Wilhelm Friedrich Ratte (born 14 February 1948) is a former member of the elite Rhodesian Special Air Service of the Rhodesian Army, and former lieutenant colonel in the 32 Battalion of the South African Defence Force.

== Early life ==
Wilhelm Friedrich Ratte was born on 14 February 1948 in Paarl, a town located 60 kilometers east of Cape Town, to a South African mother of German descent, Hertha Stoltz and a German father, Wilhelm Joseph Ratte from Recklinghausen. He was the youngest son and attended school in Germany and South Africa. Wilhelm Ratte was named after his grandfather and lived with his foster parents Heinrich and Maria Ratte while attending school in Germany. He graduated from high school in South Africa in 1964. In 1972 he became a school teacher and moved to Namibia where he taught at a German school in Windhoek.

== Military career ==
Ratte volunteered to join the Rhodesian Army in 1973 and was in the Rhodesian Light Infantry and later transferred to the elite Rhodesian Special Air Service. After six years in the Rhodesian Army and before the 1980 disbandment of the Rhodesian Special Air Service, Ratte left and joined the South African Defence Force. He was transferred to the elite 32 Battalion in 1979 with the rank of lieutenant. His command and reconnaissance skills during reconnaissance operations such as "Project Spiderweb" earned him a promotion in 1984 to the rank of captain and in 1985 promoted again to the rank of major. In 1990 he was again promoted, this time to the rank of lieutenant colonel. He resigned in 1991.

=== Awards ===
- Southern Africa Medal
- Pro Patria Medal
- General Service Medal (South Africa)
- Good Service Medal (Bronze (10 Years))

== Post-military ==
=== Disbandment ===
The mainly San 31 Battalion was disbanded on 7 March 1993 and 32 Battalion was disbanded on 26 March 1993. 32 Battalion consisted mainly of former FNLA members who had fled from Angola. Both battalions were disbanded due to allegations of participation in political violence. Willem Ratte and his men wanted to hand over 30 one rand coins to President F.W. de Klerk in parliament as a symbol of what was described as "Judas treachery for the total disbandment of former black Portuguese speaking soldiers who fought Marxism" in the South African Border War. The bag of coins and list of fallen 32 Battalion members could not be handed over directly in parliament and was given to Dr Willie Snyman the leader for the Conservative Party for Pietersburg. President de Klerk refused to accept the bag and the list from him and it was seized and held in parliament.

=== Fort Schanskop – 1993/1994 ===
On 16 December 1993 Willem Ratte led the paramilitary "Pretoria Boere Commando" to occupy Pretoria's Fort Schanskop, an old German designed Fort completed in 1897, to mark the anniversary of the Day of the Vow. The armed protest and occupation was their objection to a multi-racial government at the cost of Boer and Afrikaner heritage. Fort Schanskop being symbolic of their heritage as it was built to ward off the British by the Boers and Afrikaners in 1899 before the Anglo Boer War. While the Fort was being occupied by Willem Ratte and the Pretoria Boere Commando, the government called in General Constand Viljoen and Kobus Visser to end the occupation and to get them to surrender. Ratte and 2 others of the Pretoria Boere Commando refused to surrender and escaped from the Fort that night even while encircled by the South African National Defense Force and South African Police. Those who chose to hand themselves over had not been arrested on weapons charges as all their firearms had been licensed. Two days later Willem Ratte broadcast from Radio Donkerhoek stating that he would not surrender. A few days after the incident at Fort Schanskop a locked door was forced open by police and explosives found. During the subsequent trial the police could not connect Willem Ratte to the explosives. They were all later tried and convicted for the illegal armed occupation. Ratte refused to acknowledge the validity of the court and did not speak in his defense. Judge M.C. De Witt, sentenced him to 20 years, of which 15 years were suspended. Reaction from the South African media was mixed. The issue of heritage was repeated in the speech given by Willem Ratte in 1995 with regards to the illegal armed occupation of Fort Schanskop when he pointed to the English speaking press saying:

"Our struggle has nothing to do with right or left... this being incidental, like religion in the Irish-British conflict, but everything to do with a nation having an inherent right to be free."

— Sunday Independent (Johannesburg) 31 December 1995.

=== Radio Donkerhoek – 1994/95 ===
Radio Donkerhoek was also called the Boer Resistance Radio by its broadcasters. There had been much opposition to the granting of the broadcasting license for Radio Donkerhoek as the stated goal for the radio station was to further the culture and heritage of the Boer and Afrikaner. The delegates at the IBA hearing made it clear that Radio Donkerhoek would also push for a volkstaat and that black Afrikaans speakers would not be allowed to join the channel. Radio Vryheid, Radio Donkerhoek, Radio Koppies, Radio Volkstem and Radio Pretoria had been started in 1994 by the Pretoria Boere Commando and the Afrikaner Volksfront (AVF) and operated without licenses. The South African government viewed them as 'pirate' radio stations however they were the first community based radio stations in South African history. Radio Pretoria went off-air and got its license in 1995 however Radio Donkerhoek was still broadcasting through this time without a license. Police only acted when the IBA (Independent Broadcasting Authority) filed a complaint. The South African Defence Force and police swooped on the station. Willem Ratte and his 4-year-old daughter and another two had locked themselves inside. Willem Ratte stated to police that they could get the equipment over his dead body. They negotiated a settlement that the South African Defence Force and the police would withdraw on condition that the police open a crime docket to investigate Radio Donkerhoek.

=== Shell House Massacre – 1994/1995 ===
The Shell House massacre occurred in 1994 which was a shooting incident that took place at the headquarters of the African National Congress (ANC), in central Johannesburg, South Africa in the lead up to the 1994 elections. In 1995, Willem Ratte laid a complaint of murder against president Nelson Mandela at the Police headquarters in Pretoria for the Shell House Massacre where ANC members shot at Zulu protestors from the roof top of their headquarters at Shell House after Nelson Mandela had ordered that Shell House be protected.

=== Save Willem Ratte Campaign – 1996 ===
Willem Ratte and others started serving their 5-year sentences for the occupation of Fort Schanskop in 1993. In June 1996 a grouping called the "Friends of Willem Ratte" started protests around the country demanding his release. In 1996 the matter of his sentence and his hunger strike was brought before parliament again by General Constand Viljoen. Members of parliament had objected to the "Save Willem Ratte Campaign" as they viewed it as agitating and counter-productive to his release. Mass action moved forward in the campaign and amongst other protests the N1 (National Road) near Pretoria was blockaded for 2 hours. Nelson Mandela responded by condemning the protests in parliament and stating that no government could respond to such demands of release. During the course of 1996 a number of snap debates took place in parliament with regards to the release of Willem Ratte. In June 1996 more than 1,000 'right-wingers' descended on Pretoria Central Prison demanding his release. From there the protests moved to City Hall and they were joined by Eugene Terreblanche who arrived on horseback. The following day the protests continued with the burning of the South African flag while blaming the South African media for the current 'communist' regime of the ANC running the country. On 20 June 1996 the South African government again turned down the plea from the Freedom Front to release Willem Ratte.

=== Post-1996 – present ===
In 2010 Willem Ratte was again arrested and faced charges of illegal possession of dagga, unlicensed firearms and ammunition. He embarked on a hunger strike from 1 October 2010 to 1 November 2010 in jail. He was released on R2,000 bail. A charge of obstruction of justice had later been laid against the investigating officers in the case as Ratte alleged that they had continually made up new charges to hold him in custody. All charges were later withdrawn by the state.
