= Reuven, Gauteng =

Reuven
- Location within Gauteng Location within South Africa
- Coordinates: 26.233°S 28.028°E
- Country: South Africa
- Province: Gauteng
- Municipality: City of Johannesburg
- Main Place: Johannesburg

Area
  - Total: 0.56 km^{2} (0.22 sq mi)

Population (2011)
  - Total: 466
  - Density: 830/km^{2} (2,200/sq mi)

Racial makeup (2011)
  - Black African: 34.7%
  - Coloured: 11.6%
  - Indian/Asian: 15.0%
  - White: 36.2%
  - Other: 2.6%

First languages (2011)
  - English: 40.6%
  - Zulu: 21.3%
  - Afrikaans: 16.4%
  - Sotho: 3.9%
  - Other: 17.9%
- Time zone: UTC+2 (SAST)
- Postal code (street): 2091

Reuven is a suburb of Johannesburg, South Africa. It is located in Region F of the City of Johannesburg Metropolitan Municipality.

== History ==
It would be proclaimed as suburb on 22 May 1963. Reuven is Hebrew for Robert and is named after Robert Horowitz.
