= Vivian Reddy =

South African businessman (born 1953)

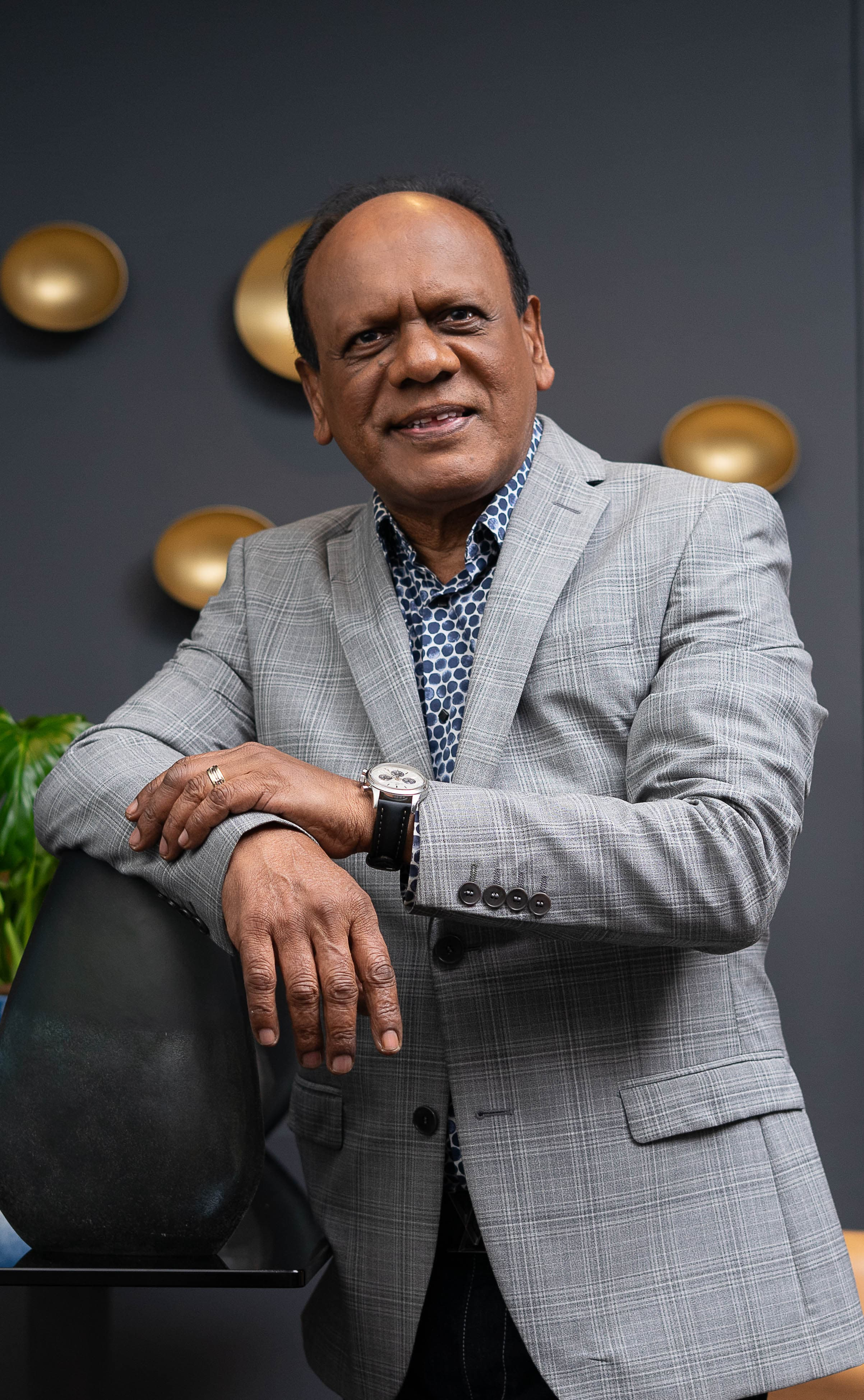
- Born: Vathasallum Reddy; 22 February 1953; Durban, Natal; Union of South Africa
- Known for: Founder of Edison Power Group and Oceans uMhlanga Development
- Website: www.vivianreddy.com

Vathasallum "Vivian" Reddy (born 22 February 1953) is a South African businessman from KwaZulu-Natal. He is the founder and chairperson of the Edison Power Group, an electrical company, and he also has business interests in casinos, healthcare, financial services, and property development.

== Early life and career ==
Reddy was born on 22 February 1953 in Greenwood Park, a suburb of Durban. He was designated as Indian under apartheid. His father was a teacher and he was the youngest of nine children. At the age of 16, he was selected to represent South Africa at a Boy Scout Jamboree in Japan, where he met Neil Armstrong, his adolescent hero.

After finishing high school, Reddy enrolled at Springfield Training College, but he decided a fortnight later that he wanted to be an electrical engineer. After he was fired from his engineering apprenticeship, he founded Reddy's Electrical, an electrical contracting firm; he apparently began the firm with only a R500 loan and a borrowed bakkie.

== Business career ==
Reddy's Electrical was later renamed as Edison Power. The company frequently did business with the state, including in a series of contracts for the procurement of smart electricity meters in the City of Johannesburg. An independent investigation concluded in November 2013 that there was no evidence of irregularities in a R1.25-billion contract between Edison Power and City Power. However, a subsequent forensic investigation, commissioned by the City of Johannesburg in 2017, concluded that one of the related contracts was irregular and did not comply with "legislative and administrative" regulations.

Reddy is also known for his personal and business links to former President Jacob Zuma. He joined Zuma's political party, the African National Congress, in 1990.

== Philanthropy ==
Reddy is involved in several South African charity initiatives such as the Orphans of AIDS Trust Fund. He has donated substantially to various community projects such the Wingen Heights Secondary School building project and donating R6 million to the eThekwini Metropolitan Municipality to build a clinic. He treated the residents of Bayview, Chatsworth to a Diwali celebration in commemoration of 150 years of Indian settlement in South Africa since 1860.

== Personal life ==
Reddy and his first wife, Mogi Naidoo, share three children, Yavini, a paediatrician, Shantan, and IT student Kuber. In 2003, he married his second wife, Sorisha Naidoo, who is a media personality, actress, and cast member of The Real Housewives of Durban. They have two children together: a son, Saihil, and daughter, Kalina. In 2021, following a dispute at the Press Ombudsman, the Daily Maverick published an official apology to Naidoo for "insinuating that she had married him [Reddy] for his money".

For his 60th birthday in 2013, Reddy spent R10 million on an extravagant celebration at his home in Umhlanga with 150 close family, friends and prominent political figures.

== Honours ==
Reddy has achieved the following awards:

- 1992 Four Outstanding South Africans (FOYSA Award)
- 1993 International Senate Award
- 1993 Distinguished Service Award
- 1993 South African Young Achiever Award
- 1998 Rotary International – Paul Harris Community Service Award
- 2003 Global Indian Entrepreneur of the Year Award
- 2007 Voted the Most Admired Businessperson in KwaZulu-Natal
- 2009 Award for Sustainable Contribution to Engineering and Business
- 2011 Living Legend Award from City of Durban
- 2012 Invited to Bill Clinton Global Initiative
