= Johannesburg Gas Works =

South African historical industrial site

Coordinates: 26.1897972°S 28.0192385°E

The Johannesburg Gas Works, also known as Egoli Gas Works, is a defunct gas production facility in Johannesburg, South Africa. Established in 1892, it is one of the most historically and architecturally significant industrial sites in the city.

Not only does it have intact machinery to show the production of gas but it also has structurally sound buildings, which in their entirety, show the process from how gas was produced out of coal, to how it was distributed to the public.

Gas production is now extinct, but the buildings remain as a reminder of what used to be on the site. The gas tanks are a major landmark in Johannesburg. The Gas Works have a rich workers history, which exemplifies the way in which workers were segregated during apartheid.

== History ==
It was decided at the turn of the 20th century that Cottesloe site was the most suitable to establish the Gas Works. There was not only ample space for the site but at that time the site was also on the outskirts of the town. Statements made by the Consulting Engineer at that time indicated that they needed an obscure site where the Gas Works would be within reach of consumers but also be unimposing in terms of the structures. The Council was congratulated for finding a suitable area so well tucked away as to render the works largely invisible from the residential areas.

The gas tanks which are the most prominent features of any Gas Works, were to be of the ‘disappearing type’ that is only visible to the extent to which they are inflated and moreover they were to be placed upon the lower level of the site, which would be planted to almost completely screen the structures. The idea to make the gas tanks as inconspicuous as possible seems to have been abandoned later as the other three gas tanks were added and, though they were also, ‘of the disappearing kind’, they were much higher than the first two and were more visible from the road. The gas tanks have become part of the skyline of the city and, rather than be an eyesore as the city anticipated in 1927, they are now regarded as a heritage landmark.

Another reason why the Council decided to choose that particular site for the new Gas Works was that the area gently sloped. The Engineers thought this was advantageous as this could assist in the gravity flow of the various liquids that were involved in the gas making process. Construction on the site began sometime in 1926 and operation on 23 December 1928. The President Street Gas Works was shut down on the same day after 36 years of operation.

The 1940s and 50s were years of expansion for the Gas Works. The future for gas was bright as gas users had increased over the years. When the Gas Works started operating in 1929, statistics quoted at that time estimated that there were 1 265 consumers of gas. By 1949 there were as many as 15 000 consumers excluding the sub-consumers in apartments. While the domestic consumers outnumbered the industrial consumers, 300 industries were dependent on the Works for the bulk of their power. It was no wonder then that the Works expanded during this time. A number of buildings were erected including a second retort house as testament to the growing demand. Buildings were planned in 1942 and were completed and commissioned on 22 April 1943 and 8 April 1948 (for the retorts). A total of 78 retorts were under operation by 1948. Construction continued into the 50s with the carbureted water gas being completed in 1951.

One of the marketing strategies which they used at the time was branding. Mr Therm was introduced as the company’s mascot in the 1940s and still remains today. Mr Therm was introduced to the British public in 1933 as they were looking, ‘for a symbol to popularize the word ‘therm’ and the usage of gas’ (Gas Brochure 1949-50).

From the time they introduced Mr Therm, he was present in every advertisement, poster, booklet and publicity material that was available. Mr Therm, ‘depicts a gas flame in the form of a bright young man with a halo around his head and with his legs and arms on fire.’(ibid) After he was introduced to the Johannesburg Gas Works, he was used extensively in booklets, brochures and other publicity material. He was also found on certain buildings such as the main office building.

While the 1940s and 50s were an era of expansion, from the 1960s the Works began to experience a decline in the production of gas. According to Peter Finsen, from the 1960s the Gas Department made an agreement with Sasol for them to supplement the gas being produced by the Works. This was done in order to ease the demand for the gas which was consumed in and around Johannesburg. It was further believed that the gas from Sasol was superior to the one that was being produced at the site - considered as impure. In 1988 the decision was taken to close down the Works and this finally happened in 1992.

At the time of closure, the Works were producing only 5% of the gas that was needed by consumers in Johannesburg. As the Gas Works began to be supplied with more and more gas, its chief operation as a producer of gas began to fall away. It became more economical for the Council to buy the gas from Sasol rather than produce it from coal. Furthermore, concerns regarding the inferior quality of the gas, the antiquated technology used, the higher cost of production as well as environmental concerns inter alia complaints about the yellow smoke bellowing from the chimneys of the retorts, all played a role in closing down the Works.

In addition, there were also concerns that the Works were releasing pollutants into the Braamfontein Spruit which runs along the edge of the Gas Works (ibid). Peter Finsen however refutes this claim. He claims that the water was being tested constantly when he was working in the laboratory, especially the stream that was about 600 metres underground in the coal works (Interview Peter Finsen 2010). He emphasised that the water at the end of the works would come out cleaner than that which had come in. He attributed this to the fact that bacteria in the soil would break down some of the pollutants when they came in contact with the soil making the water clean (ibid). Quintus Joubert similarly commented that testing was still done on the site and the incoming water was the same as the outgoing water.

It is uncertain therefore if the concern regarding pollution at the Works was unfounded or exaggerated but what was clear from the archival material was that the Council was eager to get rid of their asset. In 1988 when the decision was made to stop operations, the Council decided to lease the Works to an independent company to operate the Gas Works site. Tender documents were issued to seven firms.

== 1992 Shutdown ==
The buildings of the Gas Works that were used to produce gas after 1992 lay fallow. The council still used the other buildings to store and distribute the gas. The offices were still used for administrative purposes and the gas holders were used to store gas.

In 1993 the Council began to look into the partial demolition of the site and the clearing up of the site so that it could be used for other purposes. Other sections of the site were already being leased to companies. From the beginning, the Council was conscious that the site was of historical importance and it communicated with the National Monuments Council (NMC) on the demolition of machinery and the seeking of the necessary permits for the demolition of the buildings (National Monuments Council Correspondence 1993).

It is unclear if the demolition of the machinery started in 1993 as there was much correspondence between the NMC and the City on the demolition of the machinery and buildings. It was decided early in 1993 that the demolition should take place before the site could be economically redeveloped (Minutes of the Council 1993). During that time, demolition of a number of sheds at the back of the site began and the NMC was able to stop further demolition until a proper site inspection of the historic buildings had taken place. It was recognised during these meetings that the 22 000 m2 that the gas department occupied was not being economically utilized and that it was possible to relocate or re-establish the branch on a much smaller area (ibid). There was also the hope that the sale of scrap material would be utilized to pay off loans and debts that the council had accumulated (ibid).

Because the site was so complicated in terms of the consultation that had to be done between heritage authorities and the council between 1993 and 1996, there was much talk and correspondence about the future of the site but little was done. Letters went back and forth between the NMC and the Council stating the plans they had for the demolition and the future plans of the Gas Works. It is sad that none of those plans came into fruition and the buildings on the site slowly began to deteriorate. In 1996 plans were revived for the demolition of some of the machinery and some of the buildings on site. Correspondence between the NMC and the city shows that some of the applications to demolish some of the buildings were refused on the basis that they had to be part of a larger Conservation Management Plan. A Conservation Management Plan was however never completed for the site but, according to Peter Finsen, the demolition of certain machinery on the site took place and Retort No. 2 for example was left empty as there was a vision to re-use the space for another purpose in the future.

As a result, thieves began to notice that there was stripping being done in the buildings. Some would come at night and steal some of the machinery for recycling. In the end, even parts of machines that were intended to be kept intact were now being damaged and stripped. After the exercise was complete, it became increasingly evident that the site had to be sold. It was sold in 2001 to an American Company who decided to sell their 95% shareholding to three individuals in 2003 (Egoli Empowerment Holdings holds 5% of the shares of the company).

Since 2003 the company has grown and has gone into a new era where the current management began to re-lay all the gas pipes in Johannesburg so as to make them compatible with the natural gas that is pumped from Mozambique, via Sasol Secunda to the suburbs of Johannesburg. The change has made the company more efficient and profitable. Although this era has ushered in success for the company, it has made the contrast of the unused buildings even starker.

The buildings, which have been standing empty for almost two decades, are in a deplorable state. They are actually dangerous to walk in because of all the rusted steel and the holes where demolished machinery used to stand. The proposed future development will revive the old buildings and breathe a new life onto the site.

== State of Conservation ==
The site is currently used by Egoli Gas for their offices and workshops. The original Gas Works buildings have not been in active use since 1992, and most of the machinery was removed after the gas factory closed down.

The face brick buildings are still in good condition and are mostly structurally intact. The first installed retort from 1929 is still complete, and represents the manufacturing process of making gas out of coal.
