= Shell House (Johannesburg) =

Former ANC headquarters in South Africa

- Interactive map of the Shell House area

General information
- Location: 51 Plein St, Johannesburg, South Africa
- Coordinates: 26.19920°S 28.04641°E

Shell House is an office building located at 51 Plein Street, Johannesburg. It was donated to South Africa's African National Congress (ANC) by the oil company Shell. The ANC has governed the country since 1994. The ANC is now located in Luthuli House. It was the scene of the Shell House massacre on 28 March 1994, when ANC security guards opened fire on a crowd of about 20,000 supporters of the rival Inkatha Freedom Party (IFP), killing nineteen people.

The ANC relocated its head office from Shell House to Luthuli House in 1997.
