= Luthuli House =

Chief Albert Luthuli House
- ANC House
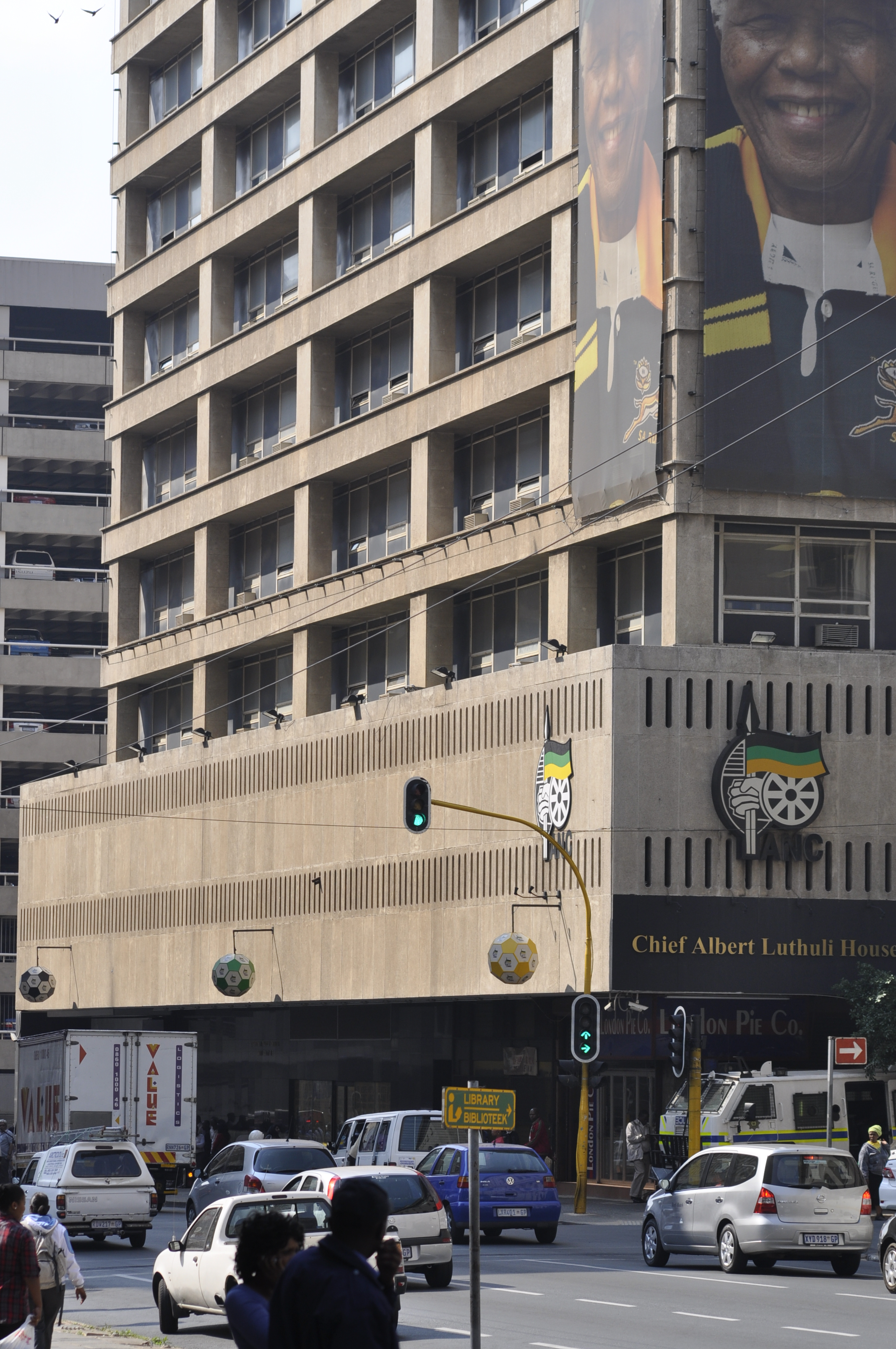
- Luthuli House
- Interactive map of the Chief Albert Luthuli House area

General information
- Status: Completed
- Type: Office building
- Location: 54 Sauer Street, Johannesburg

Height
- Roof: 46.87 metres (153.8 ft)

Technical details
- Floor count: 12

Chief Albert Luthuli House in Johannesburg, more simply known as Luthuli House, is the headquarters of the African National Congress (ANC) and other subsidiary organizations. The name "Luthuli House" is frequently used as a metonym for the national leadership of the African National Congress.

== Structure ==
Luthuli House is a 12-floor building at 54 Sauer Street, Johannesburg. The ANC headquarters are officially located on the 7th floor, while the 6th floor houses the office of the Secretary-General.

== History ==
Luthuli House is often confused with Shell House, the 22-floor former head office of the African National Congress (ANC) at 1 Plein Street, Johannesburg. It is not the same building. The ANC relocated its head office from Shell House to Luthuli House in 1997. Luthuli house was built by Hofman Construction, a small family-owned construction company. Little is known about the construction company other than it liquidated in the early 80s.

=== Incidents ===
On the afternoon of 27 August 2005, a fire broke out on the 6th floor of the building, primarily damaging the ANC's Political Education and Training Unit. Emergency personnel were successful in putting out the blaze by the evening. The ANC claimed the cause of the fire was arson.

On 12 February 2014, the main opposition party, the Democratic Alliance, planned a march on the building and the area was barricaded with coils of razor wire. The march was called off due to security concerns. Another march on Luthuli House planned for April 2017 for the removal of President Zuma was relocated to a different route.
