= Tygervallei (House of Assembly of South Africa constituency) =

- Former constituency for the South African House of Assembly
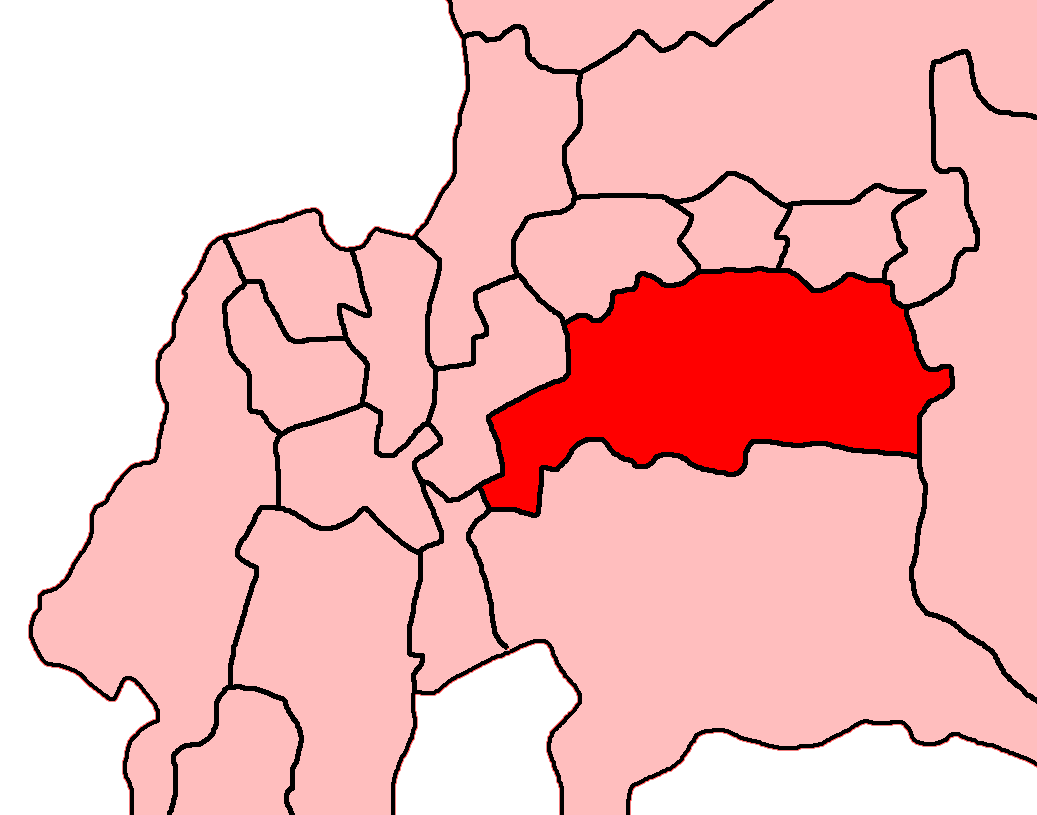
- Location of Tygervallei within Cape Town (1981)
- Province: Cape of Good Hope
- Electorate: 17,608 (1989)

Former constituency
- Created: 1966
- Abolished: 1994
- Number of members: 1
- Last MHA: Sakkie Pretorius (NP)
- Replaced by: Western Cape

Tygervallei was a constituency in the Cape Province of South Africa, which existed from 1966 to 1994. It covered parts of the eastern suburbs of Cape Town, including much of the Cape Flats. Throughout its existence it elected one member to the House of Assembly and one to the Cape Provincial Council.

== Franchise notes ==
When the Union of South Africa was formed in 1910, the electoral qualifications in use in each pre-existing colony were kept in place. The Cape Colony had implemented a "colour-blind" franchise known as the Cape Qualified Franchise, which included all adult literate men owning more than £75 worth of property (controversially raised from £25 in 1892), and this initially remained in effect after the colony became the Cape Province. As of 1908, 22,784 out of 152,221 electors in the Cape Colony were "Native or Coloured". Eligibility to serve in Parliament and the Provincial Council, however, was restricted to whites from 1910 onward.

The first challenge to the Cape Qualified Franchise came with the Women's Enfranchisement Act, 1930 and the Franchise Laws Amendment Act, 1931, which extended the vote to women and removed property qualifications for the white population only – non-white voters remained subject to the earlier restrictions. In 1936, the Representation of Natives Act removed all black voters from the common electoral roll and introduced three "Native Representative Members", white MPs elected by the black voters of the province and meant to represent their interests in particular. A similar provision was made for Coloured voters with the Separate Representation of Voters Act, 1951, and although this law was challenged by the courts, it went into effect in time for the 1958 general election, which was thus held with all-white voter rolls for the first time in South African history. The all-white franchise would continue until the end of apartheid and the introduction of universal suffrage in 1994.

== History ==
Tygervallei was created in 1966, as a result of suburban growth in eastern Cape Town, and largely resembled the former Cape Flats seat that had been abolished in 1958. Like the rest of Cape Town’s northern suburbs, its electorate was largely working-class and Afrikaans-speaking, and it was a safe seat for the National Party, which won the seat unopposed in both 1966 and 1970. Its first MP, Alexander van Breda, represented the constituency until 1989, at which point he handed over to fellow National Party member Sakkie Pretorius, who represented it until its abolition in 1994.

== Members ==
Election	Member	Party
1966	Alexander van Breda	National
1970	Alexander van Breda	National
1974	Alexander van Breda	National
1977	Alexander van Breda	National
1981	Alexander van Breda	National
1987	Alexander van Breda	National
1989	Sakkie Pretorius	National
1994	constituency abolished	
