= Western Cape (National Assembly of South Africa constituency) =

- Wes-Kaap iNtshona-Koloni
- Constituency for the National Assembly of South Africa
- Location of Western Cape within South Africa
- Province: Western Cape
- Population: 7,005,741 (2020)
- Electorate: 3,317,072 (2024)

Current constituency
- Created: 1994
- Seats: 24: 24 (2024–present); 23 (2009–2024); 21 (2004–2009); 20 (1999–2004); 21 (1994–1999)

Western Cape (Afrikaans: Wes-Kaap; Xhosa: iNtshona-Koloni) is one of the nine multi-member constituencies of the National Assembly of South Africa, the lower house of the Parliament of South Africa, the national legislature of South Africa. The constituency was established in 1994 when the National Assembly was established by the Interim Constitution following the end of Apartheid. It is conterminous with the province of Western Cape. The constituency currently elects 24 of the 400 members of the National Assembly using the closed party-list proportional representation electoral system. At the 2024 general election it had 3,317,072 registered electors.

== Electoral system ==
200 of the 400 members of the National Assembly are elected by nine constituencies which correspond to the nine provinces of South Africa. These members are elected under a system of closed party-list proportional representation, using the largest remainder method with a Droop quota. From 1994 to 2019 the same ballot paper was used to determine the overall seat allocation of the National Assembly and the allocation of the provincial seats. In the 2024 election a separate "regional" ballot paper was introduced for the provincial seats, which allows for the participation of independent candidates. As of 2024 the Western Cape constituency elects 24 members.

== Election results ==
=== Summary ===
Election	ACDP		ANC		DP/DA		EFF		ID		NCC		NP/NNP		PA		VF/VF+	
Election	Vote %	Seats	Vote %	Seats	Vote %	Seats	Vote %	Seats	Vote %	Seats	Vote %	Seats	Vote %	Seats	Vote %	Seats	Vote %	Seats
1994	0.97	0	33.60	7	4.18	1							56.24	12			1.97	1
1999	3.11	1	42.62	9	14.18	3							34.38	7			0.66	0
2004	3.78	1	46.28	10	26.92	6			7.97	2			9.44	2			1.24	0
2009	1.62	0	32.86	8	48.78	12			4.49	1							0.86	0
2014	1.17	0	34.00	8	57.26	14	2.32	1							0.37	0	1.07	0
2019	2.80	1	31.23	7	52.41	13	4.19	1							0.03	0	2.81	1
2024	1.30	0	19.79	5	53.40	14	5.40	1			2.40	1			7.84	2	1.65	1

=== 2024 ===
Results of the regional ballot for the Western Cape in the 2024 general election held on 29 May 2024:

Party/Candidate	Votes	%	Seats	+/–
Democratic Alliance	1,048,273	53.40	14	+1
African National Congress	388,390	19.79	5	–2
Patriotic Alliance	153,936	7.84	2	+2
Economic Freedom Fighters	105,940	5.40	1	0
National Coloured Congress	47,188	2.40	1	New
Freedom Front Plus	32,440	1.65	1	0
Al Jama-ah	26,787	1.36	0	0
African Christian Democratic Party	25,598	1.30	0	–1
Good	22,453	1.14	0	0
uMkhonto weSizwe	11,747	0.60	0	New
Zackie Achmat (independent)	10,679	0.54	0	New
Rise Mzansi	10,396	0.53	0	New
Build One South Africa	9,734	0.50	0	New
Africa Restoration Alliance	8,596	0.44	0	New
Pan Africanist Congress of Azania	6,751	0.34	0	0
United Democratic Movement	6,540	0.33	0	0
ActionSA	6,012	0.31	0	New
African Transformation Movement	5,934	0.30	0	0
Allied Movement for Change	5,214	0.27	0	New
United Independent Movement	4,940	0.25	0	New
People's Movement for Change	4,915	0.25	0	New
Referendum Party	4,206	0.21	0	New
#Hope4SA	4,108	0.21	0	New
Alliance of Citizens for Change	2,235	0.11	0	New
Organic Humanity Movement	1,960	0.10	0	New
Congress of the People	1,594	0.08	0	0
Inkatha Freedom Party	1,562	0.08	0	0
African People's Convention	1,058	0.05	0	0
Sizwe Ummah Nation	1,031	0.05	0	New
Azanian People's Organisation	780	0.04	0	0
South African Rainbow Alliance	544	0.03	0	New
Free Democrats	440	0.02	0	0
African Congress for Transformation	348	0.02	0	New
Citizans	313	0.02	0	New
Economic Liberators Forum South Africa	288	0.01	0	New
Total	1,962,930	100.00	24	+1
Valid votes	1,962,930	99.29		
Invalid/blank votes	14,037	0.71		
Total votes	1,976,967	100.00		
Registered voters/turnout	3,317,072	59.60		

The following candidates were elected.

Name	Party
Andrew Bateman	DA
Eleanore Bouw-Spies	DA
Mark John Burke	DA
Ian Cameron	DA
Katherine Christie	DA
Sharon Davids	ANC
Katrina de Bruin	PA
Jan de Villiers	DA
Cameron Dugmore	ANC
Farhat Essack	DA
Evangeline Freeman	PA
Sakiena Frenchman	NCC
Kabelo Kgobisa-Ngcaba	DA
Karl le Roux	DA
Elmarie Linde	DA
Bonginkosi Madikizela	DA
Noluthando Makasi	ANC
Matlhodi Maseko	DA
Corné Mulder	VF+
Nicholas Myburgh	DA
Natasha Ntlangwini	EFF
Windy Plaatjies	ANC
Ryan Smith	DA
Mzwanele Sokopo	ANC

=== 2019 ===
Results of the national ballot for the Western Cape in the 2019 general election held on 8 May 2019:

Party	Votes	%	Seats	+/–
Democratic Alliance	1,107,065	52.41	13	–1
African National Congress	659,548	31.23	7	–1
Economic Freedom Fighters	88,428	4.19	1	0
Freedom Front Plus	59,354	2.81	1	+1
African Christian Democratic Party	59,147	2.80	1	+1
Good	47,283	2.24	0	New
Al Jama-ah	15,866	0.75	0	0
Congress of the People	9,726	0.46	0	0
Independent Civic Organisation of South Africa	9,033	0.43	0	0
United Democratic Movement	7,650	0.36	0	0
Alliance for Transformation for All	5,378	0.25	0	New
Land Party	5,348	0.25	0	New
African Transformation Movement	4,761	0.23	0	New
Pan Africanist Congress of Azania	4,183	0.20	0	0
Capitalist Party of South Africa	3,822	0.18	0	New
Socialist Revolutionary Workers Party	3,201	0.15	0	New
African Independent Congress	3,133	0.15	0	0
National Freedom Party	2,245	0.11	0	0
African Security Congress	1,599	0.08	0	New
Women Forward	1,342	0.06	0	0
Front National	1,289	0.06	0	0
African Covenant	1,101	0.05	0	New
Inkatha Freedom Party	1,012	0.05	0	0
African People's Convention	1,001	0.05	0	0
Christian Political Movement	866	0.04	0	New
Black First Land First	857	0.04	0	New
Democratic Liberal Congress	805	0.04	0	New
Agang South Africa	767	0.04	0	0
Afrikan Alliance of Social Democrats	696	0.03	0	New
Patriotic Alliance	652	0.03	0	0
Compatriots of South Africa	608	0.03	0	New
Azanian People's Organisation	559	0.03	0	0
African Democratic Change	553	0.03	0	New
Free Democrats	438	0.02	0	New
Minority Front	408	0.02	0	0
African Congress of Democrats	402	0.02	0	New
Economic Emancipation Forum	344	0.02	0	New
Better Residents Association	279	0.01	0	0
Forum for Service Delivery	271	0.01	0	New
African Renaissance Unity Party	210	0.01	0	New
African Content Movement	186	0.01	0	New
National People's Ambassadors	130	0.01	0	New
International Revelation Congress	127	0.01	0	New
South African National Congress of Traditional Authorities	114	0.01	0	New
National People's Front	113	0.01	0	New
People's Revolutionary Movement	109	0.01	0	New
Power of Africans Unity	95	0.00	0	New
South African Maintenance and Estate Beneficiaries Association	66	0.00	0	New
Total	2,112,170	100.00	23	–
Valid votes	2,112,170	99.02		
Invalid/blank votes	20,892	0.98		
Total votes	2,133,062	100.00		
Registered voters/turnout	3,128,567	68.18		

The following candidates were elected:

Name	Party
Alexandra Abrahams	DA
Michael Bagraim	DA
Eleanore Bouw-Spies	DA
Jan de Villiers	DA
Richard Dyantyi	ANC
Dion George	DA
Bheki Hadebe	ANC
Faiez Jacobs	ANC
Kenneth Jacobs	ANC
Khaya Magaxa	ANC
Richard Majola	DA
Kobus Marais	DA
Zakhele Mbhele	DA
Hisamodien Mohamed	ANC
Thandi Mpambo-Sibhukwana	DA
Corné Mulder	VF+
Siphokuhle Patrein	ANC
Emma Powell	DA
Leon Schreiber	DA
Floyd Shivambu	EFF
Marie Sukers	ACDP
Okkie Terblanche	DA
Benedicta van Minnen	DA

=== 2014 ===
Results of the 2014 general election held on 7 May 2014:

Party	Votes	%	Seats	+/–
Democratic Alliance	1,241,424	57.26	14	+2
African National Congress	737,219	34.00	8	0
Economic Freedom Fighters	50,280	2.32	1	New
African Christian Democratic Party	25,318	1.17	0	0
Freedom Front Plus	23,243	1.07	0	0
Congress of the People	13,833	0.64	0	–2
United Democratic Movement	13,052	0.60	0	0
Al Jama-ah	11,376	0.52	0	0
Independent Civic Organisation of South Africa	11,124	0.51	0	New
Agang South Africa	9,927	0.46	0	New
Patriotic Alliance	7,996	0.37	0	New
African Independent Congress	6,987	0.32	0	New
Pan Africanist Congress of Azania	3,963	0.18	0	0
Ubuntu Party	2,211	0.10	0	New
African People's Convention	1,491	0.07	0	0
United Christian Democratic Party	1,153	0.05	0	0
Inkatha Freedom Party	1,127	0.05	0	0
National Freedom Party	1,048	0.05	0	New
Azanian People's Organisation	951	0.04	0	0
Workers and Socialist Party	760	0.04	0	New
First Nation Liberation Alliance	623	0.03	0	New
Front National	573	0.03	0	New
Kingdom Governance Movement	524	0.02	0	New
Keep It Straight and Simple Party	421	0.02	0	0
Minority Front	398	0.02	0	0
Peoples Alliance	382	0.02	0	New
Pan Africanist Movement	302	0.01	0	0
Bushbuckridge Residents Association	235	0.01	0	New
United Congress	206	0.01	0	New
Total	2,168,147	100.00	23	–
Valid votes	2,168,147	99.08		
Invalid/blank votes	20,089	0.92		
Total votes	2,188,236	100.00		
Registered voters/turnout	2,941,333	74.40		

The following candidates were elected:

Name	Party
Freddie Adams	ANC
Michael Bagraim	DA
Francois Beukman	ANC
Shahid Esau	DA
Archibold Figlan	DA
Tim Harris	DA
Geordin Hill-Lewis	DA
Chris Hunsinger	DA
Lungiswa James	DA
Wilmot James	DA
Bernard Joseph	EFF
Lerumo Kalako	ANC
Zoliswa Kota-Fredericks	ANC
Andrew Madella	ANC
Tandi Mahambehlala	ANC
Richard Majola	DA
Erik Marais	DA
Kobus Marais	DA
Mandisa Matshoba	ANC
Zakhele Mbhele	DA
Bongani Mkongi	ANC
James Selfe	DA
Andricus van der Westhuizen	DA

=== 2009 ===
Results of the 2009 general election held on 22 April 2009:

Party	Votes	%	Seats	+/–
Democratic Alliance	989,132	48.78	12	+6
African National Congress	666,223	32.86	8	–2
Congress of the People	183,763	9.06	2	New
Independent Democrats	91,001	4.49	1	–1
African Christian Democratic Party	32,849	1.62	0	–1
Freedom Front Plus	17,506	0.86	0	0
United Democratic Movement	15,642	0.77	0	0
Al Jama-ah	9,808	0.48	0	New
Pan Africanist Congress of Azania	4,877	0.24	0	0
Christian Democratic Alliance	3,590	0.18	0	0
African People's Convention	1,926	0.09	0	New
Azanian People's Organisation	1,394	0.07	0	0
United Christian Democratic Party	1,348	0.07	0	0
Inkatha Freedom Party	1,316	0.06	0	0
Movement Democratic Party	1,201	0.06	0	New
United Independent Front	1,119	0.06	0	New
Great Kongress of South Africa	751	0.04	0	New
National Democratic Convention	701	0.03	0	New
Keep It Straight and Simple Party	692	0.03	0	0
Pan Africanist Movement	623	0.03	0	New
Minority Front	432	0.02	0	0
New Vision Party	431	0.02	0	New
Women Forward	411	0.02	0	New
A Party	393	0.02	0	New
Alliance of Free Democrats	236	0.01	0	New
South African Democratic Congress	214	0.01	0	New
Total	2,027,579	100.00	23	+2
Valid votes	2,027,579	98.95		
Invalid/blank votes	21,518	1.05		
Total votes	2,049,097	100.00		
Registered voters/turnout	2,634,439	77.78		

The following candidates were elected:

Name	Party
Buyiswa Blaai	COPE
Ryan Coetzee	DA
Phillip Dexter	COPE
Mgolodi Dikgacwi	ANC
Willem Doman	DA
Marius Fransman	ANC
Albert Fritz	DA
Johan Gelderblom	ANC
Lance Greyling	ID
Mpumelelo Gona	ANC
Wilmot James	DA
Zoliswa Kota-Fredericks	ANC
Helen Lamoela	DA
Caroline Makasi	ANC
Kobus Marais	DA
David Maynier	DA
Masizole Mnqasela	DA
Linda Moss	ANC
Piet Pretorius	DA
Ebrahim Rasool	ANC
Denise Robinson	DA
James Selfe	DA
Dene Smuts	DA

=== 2004 ===
Results of the 2004 general election held on 14 April 2004:

Party	Votes	%	Seats	+/–
African National Congress	742,741	46.28	10	+1
Democratic Alliance	432,107	26.92	6	+3
New National Party	151,476	9.44	2	–5
Independent Democrats	127,991	7.97	2	New
African Christian Democratic Party	60,613	3.78	1	0
United Democratic Movement	29,758	1.85	0	0
Freedom Front Plus	19,910	1.24	0	0
New Labour Party	9,866	0.61	0	New
Pan Africanist Congress of Azania	7,422	0.46	0	0
Peace and Justice Congress	4,340	0.27	0	New
Inkatha Freedom Party	3,754	0.23	0	0
United Christian Democratic Party	3,620	0.23	0	0
Christian Democratic Party	2,720	0.17	0	New
National Action	2,594	0.16	0	New
Azanian People's Organisation	1,432	0.09	0	0
Employment Movement for South Africa	1,168	0.07	0	New
Keep It Straight and Simple Party	990	0.06	0	New
The Organisation Party	823	0.05	0	New
Socialist Party of Azania	606	0.04	0	0
Minority Front	573	0.04	0	0
United Front	516	0.03	0	New
Total	1,605,020	100.00	21	+1
Valid votes	1,605,020	98.96		
Invalid/blank votes	16,819	1.04		
Total votes	1,621,839	100.00		
Registered voters/turnout	2,220,283	73.05		

The following candidates were elected:

Name	Party
Jonathan Arendse	ANC
Cecil Burgess	ID
Kent Durr	ACDP
Sarel Haasbroek	DA
Avril Harding	ID
Cecil Herandien	NNP
Rhoda Joemat	ANC
Bruce Kannemeyer	ANC
Lawrence Maduma	ANC
Caroline Makasi	ANC
Linda Moss	ANC
Maxwell Moss	ANC
Danny Olifant	ANC
Sydney Opperman	DA
Randy Pieterse	ANC
Pierre Rabie	DA
James Selfe	DA
Bulelwa Tinto	ANC
Kraai van Niekerk	DA
Marthinus van Schalkwyk	NNP
Helen Zille	DA

=== 1999 ===
Results of the 1999 general election held on 2 June 1999:

Party	Votes	%	Seats	+/–
African National Congress	682,748	42.62	9	+2
New National Party	550,775	34.38	7	–5
Democratic Party	227,087	14.18	3	+2
African Christian Democratic Party	49,807	3.11	1	+1
United Democratic Movement	49,146	3.07	0	New
Freedom Front	10,502	0.66	0	–1
Federal Alliance	8,849	0.55	0	New
Pan Africanist Congress of Azania	8,061	0.50	0	0
Inkatha Freedom Party	3,143	0.20	0	0
Afrikaner Eenheidsbeweging	3,101	0.19	0	New
Government by the People Green Party	2,850	0.18	0	New
United Christian Democratic Party	1,781	0.11	0	New
Abolition of Income Tax and Usury Party	1,468	0.09	0	New
Minority Front	1,281	0.08	0	0
Azanian People's Organisation	934	0.06	0	New
Socialist Party of Azania	389	0.02	0	New
Total	1,601,922	100.00	20	–1
Valid votes	1,601,922	99.12		
Invalid/blank votes	14,257	0.88		
Total votes	1,616,179	100.00		
Registered voters/turnout	1,864,019	86.70		

The following candidates were elected.

Name	Party
Ken Andrew	DP
Jonathan Arendse	ANC
Mnyamezeli Booi	ANC
Cobus Dowry	NNP
Rhoda Joemat	ANC
Bruce Kannemeyer	ANC
Caroline Makasi	ANC
Maxwell Moss	ANC
Danny Olifant	ANC
Randy Pieterse	ANC
Sakkie Pretorius	NNP
Rodney Rhoda	NNP
James Selfe	DP
Hennie Smit	NNP
Dene Smuts	DP
Rhoda Southgate	ACDP
Bulelwa Tinto	ANC
Frik van Deventer	NNP
Marthinus van Schalkwyk	NNP
Anna van Wyk	NNP

=== 1994 ===
Results of the national ballot for the Western Cape in the 1994 general election held between 26 and 29 April 1994:

Party	Votes	%	Seats
National Party	1,195,633	56.24	12
African National Congress	714,271	33.60	7
Democratic Party	88,804	4.18	1
Freedom Front	41,924	1.97	1
Pan Africanist Congress of Azania	21,353	1.00	0
African Christian Democratic Party	20,540	0.97	0
Africa Muslim Party	15,655	0.74	0
Inkatha Freedom Party	13,895	0.65	0
Federal Party	4,704	0.22	0
Minority Front	1,546	0.07	0
Women's Rights Peace Party	1,404	0.07	0
African Moderates Congress Party	1,286	0.06	0
Dikwankwetla Party of South Africa	1,147	0.05	0
Sport Organisation for Collective Contributions and Equal Rights	1,030	0.05	0
Keep It Straight and Simple Party	875	0.04	0
Workers' List Party	724	0.03	0
African Democratic Movement	485	0.02	0
Luso-South African Party	464	0.02	0
Ximoko Progressive Party	273	0.01	0
Total	2,126,013	100.00	21
Valid votes	2,126,013	98.80	
Invalid/blank votes	25,830	1.20	
Total votes	2,151,843	100.00	

The following candidates were elected:

Name	Party
Ken Andrew	DP
Jonathan Arendse	ANC
Rob Davies	ANC
Johnny de Lange	ANC
Dawie de Villiers	NP
John Gogotya	NP
David Graaff	NP
Pieter Grobbelaar	VF
Nomatyala Hangana	ANC
Francois Jacobsz	NP
Nic Koornhof	NP
Salie Manie	ANC
Piet Marais	NP
Danny Olifant	ANC
Naledi Pandor	ANC
Sakkie Pretorius	NP
Hennie Smit	NP
Myburgh Streicher	NP
Frik van Deventer	NP
Anna van Wyk	NP
Abe Williams	NP
