= Frik van Deventer =

South African politician (born 1944)

Member of the National Assembly
- In office May 1994 – April 2004
- Constituency: Western Cape

Personal details
- Born: Frederik Johannes van Deventer; 10 November 1944 (age 82)
- Citizenship: South Africa
- Party: Democratic Alliance (since March 2003)
- Other political affiliations: New National Party (1997–2003); National Party (until 1997)

Frederik Johannes "Frik" van Deventer (born 10 November 1944) is a retired South African politician who served in the National Assembly from 1994 to 2004. He represented the National Party (NP) and New National Party (NNP) until March 2003, when he crossed the floor to the Democratic Alliance (DA). He had been an organiser for the NP since the apartheid era and was a former deputy leader of the NNP in the Western Cape.

== Political career ==
In the 1980s, while P. W. Botha was NP leader, van Deventer served as a party organiser for the NP in the Cape Province.

In South Africa's first post-apartheid elections in 1994, he was elected to an NP seat in the new National Assembly. He served two terms in the seat, gaining re-election (under the NNP banner) in 1999; he represented the Western Cape constituency. He also served as the third deputy leader of the NNP in the Western Cape, deputising Gerald Morkel, until September 2000, when he declined to seek re-election.

Near the end of his second term, in March 2003, van Deventer resigned from the NNP and joined the DA during that month's floor-crossing window. His defection was viewed as surprising. He defected alongside several other NNP politicians, including Wilhelm le Roux and Maans Nel, and the NNP said in a statement that they had defected because "the DA now represents the rightwing in the country, and these people are old era apartheid stalwarts not in touch with new South Africa".

Van Deventer was expected to retire in 2004. He was nonetheless included on the DA's party list in the 2004 general election, but he was ranked too low to secure re-election to his seat.
