= List of South African politicians convicted of crime after the end of Apartheid =

This article is a non-exhaustive list of South African politicians accused or convicted of crimes after the end of apartheid.

== List ==
Image	Name	Position	Details	Political Affiliation
	Clive Derby-Lewis	Member of the National Assembly	Convicted of conspiracy to murder South African Communist Party leader Chris Hani and sentenced to death, a sentence which was later reduced to life imprisonment. Derby-Lewis was described as a "right-wing extremist" by The Daily Telegraph; and as someone who "even by South African standards ... has acquired over the years a reputation as a rabid racist" by journalist and South Africa commentator John Carlin.	Conservative Party
	Mcebo Dlamini	Activist	He was arrested in 2016 and charged with violating a court order, public violence, theft, malicious damage to property, and assaulting an officer during the protest. On 9 March 2020, the Johannesburg Magistrate's Court sentenced Dlamini to two years, wholly suspended for five years, for public violence. He was also given six months' imprisonment, again wholly suspended for five years, for unlawfully staying in the country.	Movement:#FeesMustFall Party: African National Congress
	Douglas Seleke Maimane	Executive Mayor of the Madibeng Local Municipality	Less than a year after he left Parliament, Maimane appeared in court on fraud charges in connection with the Travelgate scandal, which saw several MPs accused of abusing parliamentary air-travel vouchers for private gain. In October 2006, he accepted a plea bargain with the Scorpions, in terms of which he pled guilty to theft. He was sentenced to pay a fine of R25,000 or serve three years in prison, with an additional five-year prison sentence suspended for five years.	
	Julius Sello Malema	President of the Economic Freedom Fighters and Member of the National Assembly	Julius Malema, leader of the EFF, has navigated a career marked by significant legal challenges, including both convictions and charges that were ultimately dismissed. Most recently, in October 2025, Malema was found guilty on five counts related to discharging a firearm in a public area during a 2018 EFF rally. He faces a potential minimum of 15 years in prison, with sentencing scheduled for January 2026. Prior to this, Malema had already faced multiple convictions for hate speech. A court found him guilty of demeaning comments towards Jacob Zuma's rape accuser in 2010, and the Equality Court again determined in August 2025 that certain statements he made constituted hate speech and incited harm. Additionally, a High Court ruling in May 2025 upheld that he breached Parliament's Code of Ethics for misusing an official platform for personal political gain. However, not all cases against him have resulted in convictions. The most high-profile charges of fraud, corruption, and money laundering from 2012, related to government tenders in Limpopo, were dismissed by the courts in 2015 due to the prosecution's undue delays. Other ongoing cases, such as those related to inciting land invasions under the controversial Riotous Assemblies Act, remain part of his complex legal profile. Malema consistently asserts that all charges are politically motivated attempts to silence him and his party.	ANC (First), later EFF
	Mduduzi Comfort Manana	Deputy Minister of Higher Education and Training and Member of the National Assembly	In August 2017 he was charged with assaulting three women outside a Johannesburg nightclub; he pled guilty to the charges the following month. He remained an ordinary member of the National Assembly until July 2018, when he submitted to ongoing pressure to resign.	ANC
	Norman Mashabane	South African Ambassador to Indonesia	He was recalled from that country after sexual harassment charges were laid against him. He was subsequently cleared by a foreign affairs inquiry. He was later found guilty of sexual harassment charges in the Pretoria High Court, and quit his post as political adviser.	ANC
	Micheal Ngrayi Ngwenya	Regional Chairperson of the African National Congress (ANC) in Ehlanzeni, Mpumalanga from 2011 to 2019.	Michael Ngrayi Ngwenya was convicted of assault in September 2013 after punching and kicking a fellow politician during a volatile ANC meeting. He was sentenced to pay a R1,000 fine. He also faced criminal charges in 2018 for allegedly stabbing a woman at a political event, but the outcome of that case is unclear from public records.	ANC
	Daniel April Andrew Olifant	Member of the National Assembly	He was convicted of abusing Parliament's travel-voucher system in the Travelgate scandal.	ANC
	Randy Desmond Pieterse	Member of the National Assembly	In 2006, he was convicted of stealing from Parliament in the Travelgate scandal.	ANC
	Eugène Ney Terre'Blanche	Leader and Commander of the Afrikaner Weerstandsbeweging	On 17 June 2001, Terre'Blanche was sentenced to six years in prison, of which he served three years, for assaulting John Ndzima, a petrol station worker, and the attempted murder of Paul Motshabi, a security guard, in 1996. Terre'Blanche denied both accusations. One of only three whites in the Rooigrond prison near Mafikeng, during his time in prison he claimed to have become a born-again Christian.	Afrikaner Weerstandsbeweging
	Jacob Gedleyihlekisa Zuma	4th President of South Africa	Jacob Zuma's primary conviction was for contempt of court, which led to a 15-month prison sentence in 2021. This was for his refusal to appear before the Zondo Commission, which was investigating widespread allegations of corruption during his presidency, known as "state capture". He served a portion of the sentence before being granted medical parole. While Zuma has faced numerous corruption charges throughout his career, particularly concerning the 1999 Arms Deal, he has not yet been convicted on those specific charges. His corruption trial for the Arms Deal has been marked by significant delays and has yet to be concluded.	Then ANC, now MK
