= Avril Harding =

South African politician

Member of the National Assembly
- In office 23 April 2004 – 22 August 2007
- Constituency: Western Cape

Secretary-General of the Independent Democrats
- In office June 2003 – July 2007
- President: Patricia de Lille
- Preceded by: Party established
- Succeeded by: Haniff Hoosen

Personal details
- Born: 11 September 1960 (age 65)
- Citizenship: South Africa
- Party: Congress of the People
- Other political affiliations: Independent Democrats (2004–2007); Pan Africanist Congress

Avril Harding (born 11 September 1960) is a South African politician who was founding secretary-general of the Independent Democrats (ID) from the party's launch in June 2003 until July 2007. He also represented the party in the National Assembly from April 2004 to August 2007, serving the Western Cape constituency.

In August 2007, he was expelled from the Independent Democrats, and therefore from Parliament, on suspicion of planning to cross the floor. He subsequently joined the Congress of the People.

== Independent Democrats: 2003–2007 ==
Harding was formerly the elections manager of the Pan Africanist Congress (PAC), including during the party's 1999 general election campaign. In that capacity, he worked closely with PAC politician Patricia de Lille. During the 2003 floor-crossing window, de Lille defected from the PAC to establish a new party, the Independent Democrats (ID), and Harding joined her as a co-founder of the party. He was appointed as the party's inaugural secretary-general, with Monique Enser as his deputy.

=== National Assembly ===
In the 2004 general election, Harding was elected to a seat in the National Assembly. He was one of seven ID representatives in the National Assembly and, with Cecil Burgess, one of two serving in the Western Cape constituency. Retaining his post as ID secretary-general, he was also appointed as the party's chief whip in Parliament.

In early 2005, Lennit Max, an ID leader in the Western Cape, was subject to an internal ID disciplinary hearing in connection with allegations that Harding and de Lille had accepted a donation from alleged drug kingpin Quintin Marinus. De Lille had been informed that they were under investigation by the National Prosecuting Authority in this connection, and she suspected Max of having circulated the allegation, using his contacts in the police. Max maintained that it was true that Harding and de Lille had accepted the donation, though the ID strongly denied it.

In early July 2007, at an ID elective conference in Cape Town, Harding lost his bid for a second term as ID secretary-general; he was replaced by Haniff Hoosen.

=== Sexual harassment complaint ===
Within days of the 2007 elective conference, Harding was summoned for a disciplinary hearing at the ID's offices, where he was charged with sexual harassment. The complaint had been filed a month earlier by Agnes Tsamai, who over the weekend had been elected as ID deputy president. She alleged that Harding had made sexual advances during a party event in Klerksdorp on 2 June; she said that he had phoned her to ask her to have sex with him in his hotel room. The disciplinary case against Harding was postponed.

=== Expulsion ===
While the disciplinary hearing was pending, in August 2007, the ID terminated Harding's party membership, saying that Harding had been planning to defect from the party during the upcoming floor-crossing period; he was apparently slated to join a new party known as the Social Democrats. He vacated his seat in the National Assembly on 22 August 2007 as he had lost his party membership, being replaced as secretary-general by Haniff Hoosen. A legal challenge by Harding was dismissed in the Cape High Court, and the internal sexual harassment proceedings became moot. Hoosen later accused "certain individuals in the ID" of having pursued "a bid to ruin me for the rest of my life".

== Congress of the People ==
Harding joined the Congress of the People (COPE) after it was founded in 2008 and ran for election under its banner in the 2009 general election. Although he was ranked too low on the party list to win a seat, COPE announced in the aftermath of the election that Harding would be employed full-time at the party's headquarters as its head of administration in Parliament.
