= George (House of Assembly of South Africa constituency) =

South African constituency, 1910–1994

- Former constituency for the South African House of Assembly
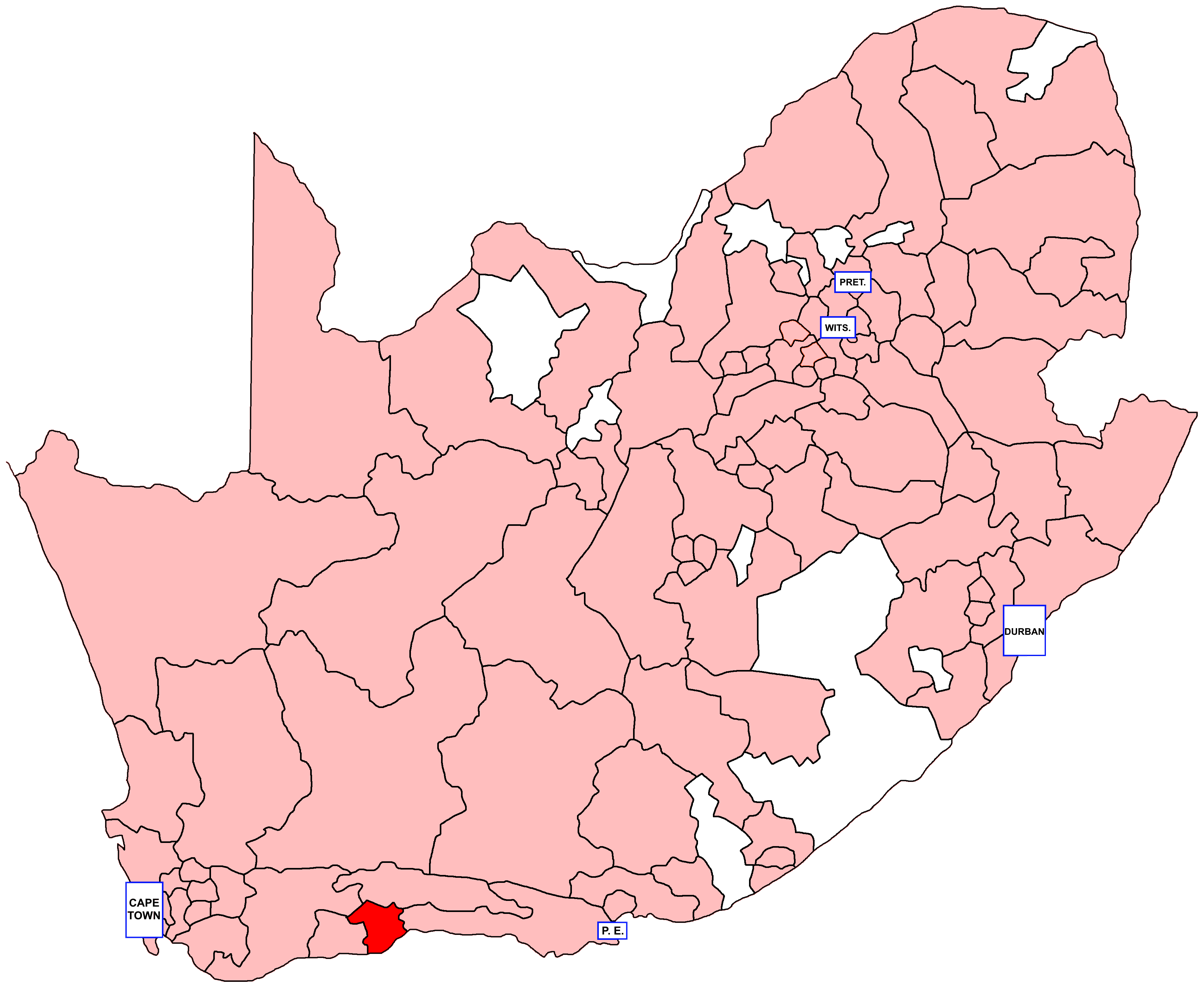
- Location of George within South Africa (1981)
- Province: Cape of Good Hope
- Electorate: 20,195 (1989)

Former constituency
- Created: 1910
- Abolished: 1994
- Number of members: 1
- Last MHA: Hennie Smit (NP)
- Replaced by: Western Cape

George was a constituency in the Cape Province of South Africa, which existed from 1910 to 1994. It covered a rural area along the Garden Route, centred on the town of George. Throughout its existence it elected one member to the House of Assembly and one to the Cape Provincial Council.

== Franchise notes ==
When the Union of South Africa was formed in 1910, the electoral qualifications in use in each pre-existing colony were kept in place. The Cape Colony had implemented a “colour-blind” franchise known as the Cape Qualified Franchise, which included all adult literate men owning more than £75 worth of property (controversially raised from £25 in 1892), and this initially remained in effect after the colony became the Cape Province. As of 1908, 22,784 out of 152,221 electors in the Cape Colony were “Native or Coloured”. Eligibility to serve in Parliament and the Provincial Council, however, was restricted to whites from 1910 onward.

The first challenge to the Cape Qualified Franchise came with the Women's Enfranchisement Act, 1930 and the Franchise Laws Amendment Act, 1931, which extended the vote to women and removed property qualifications for the white population only – non-white voters remained subject to the earlier restrictions. In 1936, the Representation of Natives Act removed all black voters from the common electoral roll and introduced three “Native Representative Members”, white MPs elected by the black voters of the province and meant to represent their interests in particular. A similar provision was made for Coloured voters with the Separate Representation of Voters Act, 1951, and although this law was challenged by the courts, it went into effect in time for the 1958 general election, which was thus held with all-white voter rolls for the first time in South African history. The all-white franchise would continue until the end of apartheid and the introduction of universal suffrage in 1994.

== History ==
Like many constituencies in the rural Cape, the electorate of George was largely Afrikaans-speaking and conservative, and with the exception of the inaugural Union election in 1910, the seat was won at every election by the National Party. In 1948, it was won for the first time by a young P. W. Botha, who would hold the constituency for the next thirty-six years. George had always been a somewhat safe seat, but under Botha it became extremely safe, with opposition candidates rarely reaching twenty percent of the vote and frequently neglecting to contest the seat altogether. The National Party voteshare declined slightly after Botha’s elevation to the state presidency in 1984, but a divided opposition meant his successors were always returned by wide margins.

== Members ==
Election	Member	Party
1910	H. L. Currey	SAP
1915	H. P. Raubenheimer	National
1920	G. F. Brink	National
1921	G. F. Brink	National
1924	G. F. Brink	National
1929	G. F. Brink	National
1933	Heinrich Gerdener	National
1934	Heinrich Gerdener	United
1938	A. J. Werth	GNP
1943	A. J. Werth	HNP
1948	P. W. Botha	HNP
1953	P. W. Botha	National
1958	P. W. Botha	National
1961	P. W. Botha	National
1966	P. W. Botha	National
1970	P. W. Botha	National
1974	P. W. Botha	National
1977	P. W. Botha	National
1981	P. W. Botha	National
1984 by	Hennie Smit	National
1987	Hennie Smit	National
1989	Hennie Smit	National
1994	constituency abolished	

== Detailed results ==
=== Elections in the 1910s ===
General election 1910: George
Party	Candidate	Votes	%	±%
South African	H. L. Currey	Unopposed		
South African win (new seat)				

General election 1915: George
Party	Candidate	Votes	%	±%
National	H. P. Raubenheimer	1,392	52.6	New
South African	H. J. Raubenheimer	1,255	47.4	N/A
Majority		137	5.2	N/A
Turnout		2,647	80.9	N/A
National gain from South African		Swing	N/A	

=== Elections in the 1920s ===
General election 1920: George
Party	Candidate	Votes	%	±%
National	G. F. Brink	1,414	50.3	−2.3
South African	T. Searle	1,396	49.7	+2.3
Majority		18	0.6	−4.6
Turnout		2,810	79.4	−1.5
National hold		Swing	-2.3	

General election 1921: George
Party	Candidate	Votes	%	±%
National	G. F. Brink	1,612	52.0	+1.7
South African	T. Searle	1,488	48.0	−1.7
Majority		124	4.0	+3.4
Turnout		3,100	80.9	+1.5
National hold		Swing	+1.7	

General election 1924: George
Party	Candidate	Votes	%	±%
National	G. F. Brink	1,724	53.8	+1.8
South African	H. J. Raubenheimer	1,453	45.3	−2.7
Rejected ballots		27	0.9	N/A
Majority		271	8.5	+4.5
Turnout		3,204	85.4	+4.5
National hold		Swing	+2.3	

General election 1929: George
Party	Candidate	Votes	%	±%
National	G. F. Brink	1,920	65.7	+12.4
South African	T. G. Truter	970	33.2	−12.1
Rejected ballots		31	1.1	+0.2
Majority		950	32.5	+24.0
Turnout		2,921	82.4	−3.0
National hold		Swing	+12.0	

=== Elections in the 1930s ===
General election 1933: George
Party	Candidate	Votes	%	±%
National	Heinrich Gerdener	3,913	79.9	+14.2
Independent	P. S. Heyns	914	18.7	New
Rejected ballots		68	1.4	+0.3
Majority		2,999	61.3	N/A
Turnout		4,895	68.4	−14.0
National hold		Swing	N/A	

General election 1938: George
Party	Candidate	Votes	%	±%
Purified National	A. J. Werth	3,913	62.0	New
United	J. M. Baker	2,356	37.3	New
Rejected ballots		43	0.7	N/A
Majority		1,557	24.7	N/A
Turnout		6,312	85.5	+17.1
Purified National gain from United		Swing	N/A	

=== Elections in the 1940s ===
General election 1943: George
Party	Candidate	Votes	%	±%
Reunited National	A. J. Werth	4,473	56.2	−6.2
United	J. R. Urban	3,492	43.8	+6.2
Majority		981	12.4	−12.4
Turnout		7,965	84.4	−0.5
Reunited National hold		Swing	-6.2	

General election 1948: George
Party	Candidate	Votes	%	±%
Reunited National	P. W. Botha	5,913	62.6	+6.4
United	M. C. Botha	3,553	37.4	−6.4
Majority		2,360	25.2	+12.8
Turnout		9,446	88.5	+4.1
Reunited National hold		Swing	+6.4	
