= Pierre Rabie (politician) =

South African politician and academic (born 1949)

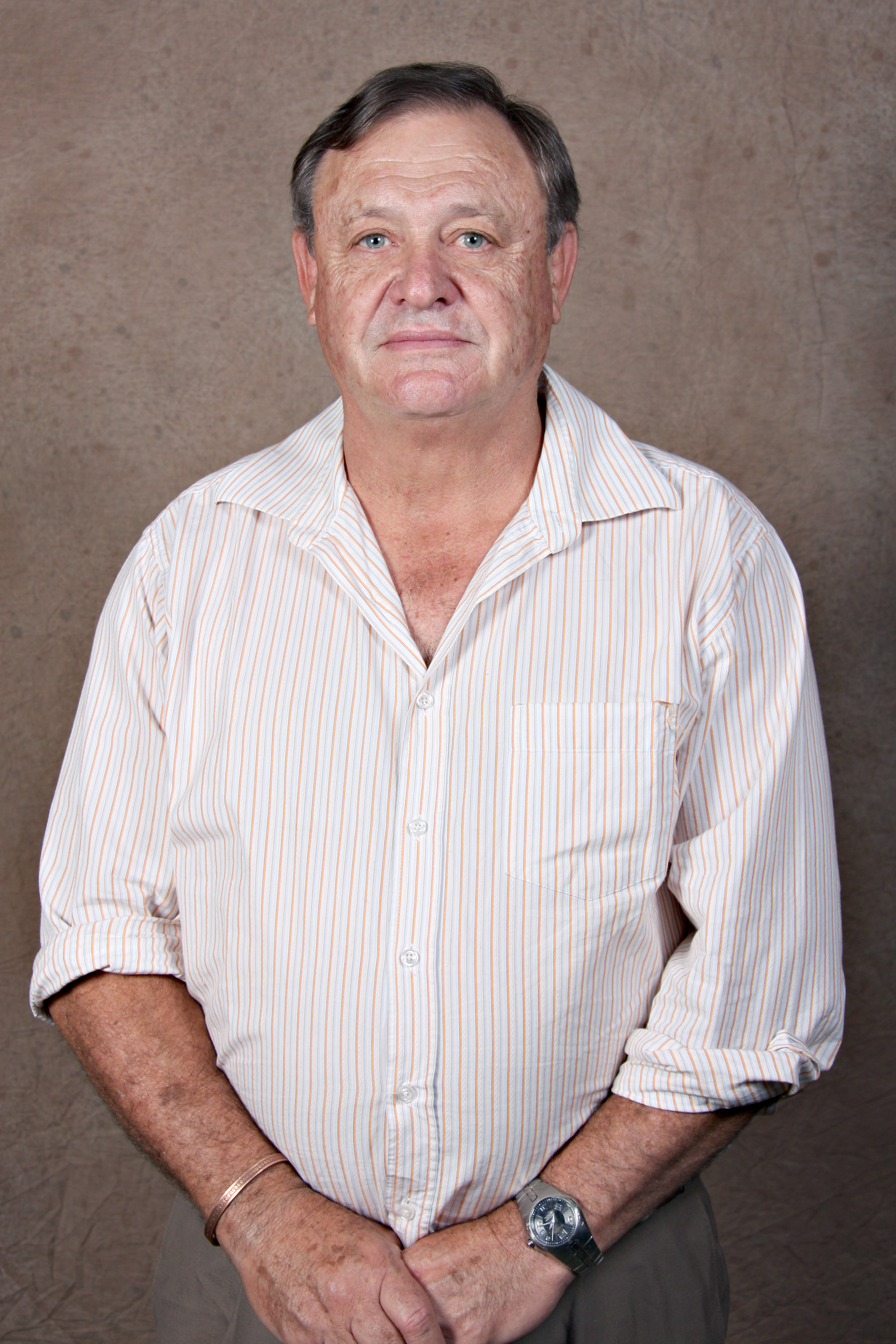
- Rabie in 2009

Member of the National Assembly
- In office June 1999 – 6 May 2014
- Constituency: Western Cape

Personal details
- Born: 22 March 1949 (age 77) Worcester, Cape Province; Union of South Africa
- Party: Democratic Alliance (since March 2003)
- Other political affiliations: New National Party (until March 2003)
- Education: Stellenbosch University (PhD)

Pierre Jacques Rabie (born 22 March 1949) is a retired South African politician and former academic from the Western Cape. He served in the National Assembly for three terms from 1999 to 2014, representing the Western Cape constituency. He was a member of the New National Party (NNP) until the March 2003 floor-crossing window, when he joined the Democratic Alliance (DA).

== Early life and career ==
Rabie was born on 22 March 1949 in Worcester in the former Cape Province. He completed a master's degree in anthropology and a doctorate in philosophy at Stellenbosch University, where he joined the anthropology faculty. He later became a senior lecturer at the University of the Western Cape and owned a farm in the region.

== Legislative career ==
In the 1999 general election, Rabie was elected to represent the NNP in the National Assembly, the lower house of the South African Parliament. The following year, the NNP joined the DA – a multi-party coalition rather than a parliamentary political party – and Rabie was appointed treasurer of the DA caucus. However, the NNP's participation in the coalition was ultimately short-lived. Rabie was serving as finance spokesperson for the NNP in March 2003 when he announced that he would join Sheila Camerer and several others in resigning from the NNP to cross the floor to the DA. He served the rest of the legislative term under the DA banner and served as the DA's spokesperson on finance.

In the 2004 general election, he was re-elected to his seat, ranked first on the Western Cape regional party list for the DA. He was appointed as DA spokesperson on trade and industry in 2005. He was re-elected to the assembly in 2009During his third and final term in the assembly, he served variously as the party's deputy spokesperson on economic development, appropriations, and the Standing Committee on Public Accounts. He left Parliament after the 2014 general election.
