= Martha Olckers =

South African politician (born 1941)

Member of the National Assembly
- In office June 1999 – April 2004
- Constituency: Western Cape

Personal details
- Born: 6 October 1941 (age 84)
- Citizenship: South Africa
- Party: New National Party; National Party

Martha Elisabet Olckers (born 6 October 1941) is a retired South African politician who was the Western Cape's inaugural Member of the Executive Council (MEC) for Education from 1994 to 1998. After her term in the Western Cape Provincial Parliament ended in 1999, she represented the New National Party (NNP) in the National Assembly from 1999 to 2004. She is also a former deputy leader of the NNP's Western Cape branch.

== Western Cape Parliament: 1994–1999 ==
In South Africa's first post-apartheid elections in 1994, Olckers was elected to the Western Cape Provincial Parliament, where Premier Hernus Kriel appointed her to the Executive Council as MEC for Education, Training and Cultural Affairs. She was a member of the National Party (NP), which controlled the provincial parliament after the election.

=== Ruyterwacht crisis ===
Early in Olckers tenure, a crisis broke out in the Ruyterwacht school district in the northern suburbs of Cape Town. In January 1995, a defunct school building in the neighbourhood had been reopened to accommodate children from Cape Town's black townships, where schools were overcrowded; the decision was fiercely opposed by the primarily white residents of the surrounding area. In January and February, the situation around the school was tense and occasionally violent, as police escorted black students to their buses through crowds of white residents, some armed with dogs or sticks. In mid-February, Olckers, in her capacity as MEC, ordered that the students should be barred from the school, saying that the building had been vandalised to such an extent that it was a health hazard. Repeating the complaints of Ruyterwacht residents about allegedly indecorous conduct by students, she said, "The children behaved themselves extremely badly. Their behaviour was absolutely unacceptable."

The move received an extremely hostile response from the National Education Coordinating Committee, the South African Democratic Teachers' Union, and the Congress of South African Students, all of which called for Olckers to resign. Although Olckers said that Premier Kriel had endorsed her decision to close the school, Kriel intervened the following week and took over from Olckers in managing the situation.

=== Resignation as MEC ===
In February 1998, Olckers was at the centre of a minor scandal following press reports that she had an extra-marital affair with her top aide. Following a meeting with Premier Kriel about the matter, Olckers told the press that she would not resign over the reports. However, she ultimately did so. Afterwards she gave an inflammatory interview to the Cape Argus, arguing that the NP leadership had subjected her to a sexist double standard by forcing her to resign over an unsubstantiated allegation while ignoring similar allegations against male representatives, including party leader Marthinus van Schalkwyk. Die Burger later reported that she had offered an "unqualified apology" to her NP colleagues over the interview. She remained in the Western Cape as an ordinary Member of the Provincial Legislature.

In December 1998, as the next general election approached, the Mail & Guardian reported that Olckers was "on the verge of quitting" her party (by then restyled as the NNP) to join the Democratic Party (DP), primarily because she was unhappy with her position on the NNP's party list. However, following reports that she had met with the DP, she publicly declared her loyalty to NNP, and in June 1999 she was elected under the NNP's banner to a seat in the Western Cape caucus of the National Assembly.

== National Assembly: 1999–2004 ==
While in the National Assembly, Olckers served in the shadow cabinet of DP leader Tony Leon in terms of a short-lived coalition between the DP and NNP; she was spokesman on intelligence for the Democratic Alliance (DA). By that time, Olckers was also one of three deputy leaders of the Western Cape branch of the NNP; she deputised Gerald Morkel and served alongside Peter Marais and Pierre Uys.

The NNP performed very poorly in the next general election in April 2004, and Olckers lost her seat in the National Assembly. Shortly after the election, it was announced that she would become South African consul-general in Munich, Germany.

== Personal life ==
Olckers has children.
