= Willem Adriaan Odendaal =

Willem Adriaan Odendaal may refer to:

- Willem Odendaal (born 1944), South African politician
- Willie Odendaal (born 1990), South African rugby player
