= Bongani Mkongi =

South African politician

The Honourable Bongani Mkongi MP

Member of the National Assembly
- Incumbent
- Assumed office 3 December 2025
- In office 21 May 2014 – 7 May 2019
- In office 1 November 2004 – 22 April 2009

Deputy Minister of Police
- In office 31 March 2017 – 25 May 2019
- President: Jacob Zuma; Cyril Ramaphosa
- Minister: Fikile Mbalula; Bheki Cele
- Preceded by: Maggie Sotyu
- Succeeded by: Cassel Mathale

Personal details
- Born: Bongani Michael Mkongi; 9 March 1971 (age 55) Gugulethu, Cape Town; Cape Province, South Africa
- Party: African National Congress (until 2024); Umkhonto weSizwe Party (since 2024)
- Education: Cape Peninsula University of Technology; University of the Western Cape

Bongani Michael Mkongi (born 9 March 1971) is a South African politician who has represented Umkhonto weSizwe Party (MK Party) in the National Assembly since December 2025. He was formerly a member of the African National Congress (ANC), in which capacity he was the Deputy Minister of Police between March 2017 and May 2019.

Mkongi entered politics as a youth activist, serving as the national secretary-general of the Congress of South African Students from 1990 to 1992 and later as the provincial chairperson of the ANC Youth League in the Western Cape. As an ANC representative, he served two non-consecutive terms in the National Assembly from 2004 to 2009 and from 2014 to 2019. In the interim he worked in Fikile Mbalula's ministerial office. In March 2017, during Mkongi's second parliamentary term, President Jacob Zuma appointed him to serve under Mbalula as a deputy minister. He held that position until he lost his parliamentary seat in the May 2019 general election.

Mkongi announced his resignation from the ANC in October 2024 and subsequently joined MK Party, which nominated him to Parliament as a backbencher in December 2025.

== Early life and education ==
Mkongi was born on 9 March 1971 in Gugulethu, a township outside Cape Town in the former Cape Province. As a teenager, he was active in anti-apartheid organisations aligned to the African National Congress (ANC), becoming the president of the Townships Students Congress in 1989 and serving as the national secretary-general of the Congress of South African Students from 1990 to 1992.

In 1993, he enrolled at the Cape Peninsula University of Technology (CPUT) in Cape Town, where he was general secretary and deputy president of the students' representative council. He graduated with a BTech in commercial education and a higher diploma in education. In 1998 he studied towards an honours degree in economics at the University of the Western Cape, but he did not complete the degree.

== National political career ==
In 1998, Mkongi was elected as the provincial chairperson of the ANC Youth League's Western Cape branch. He served two terms in the position. During his tenure, the provincial league advocated for improving the racial representativity of the ANC's leadership in the province and, relatedly, supported James Ngculu's bid to lead the mainstream ANC in the province.

=== Fourth Parliament: 2004–2009 ===
In the April 2004 general election, Mkongi was nominated as an ANC candidate for the Western Cape constituency in the National Assembly of South Africa. He narrowly failed to gain election but was sworn in shortly after the election, on 1 November 2004, to fill the casual vacancy created by Bruce Kannemeyer's resignation.

He left the National Assembly at the next general election in April 2009 in order to work for Fikile Mbalula, another former ANC Youth League leader. Mbalula was appointed as Deputy Minister of Police after the election, and Mkongi became the head of his ministerial office. In 2011, after Mbalula had been appointed as Minister of Sport and Recreation, Mkongi became director of research and speechwriting in Mbalula's new ministerial office; he was later promoted to chief of staff of Sport and Recreation South Africa, Mbalula's government department.

=== Sixth Parliament: 2014–2019 ===
In the next general election in May 2014, Mkongi was elected to return to the National Assembly, now on the ANC's national party list. He sat on the backbenches for the early years of the Sixth Parliament. He also represented the South African Parliament at the Inter-Parliamentary Union's Global Conference of Young Parliamentarians in Tokyo in 2015.

==== Parliamentary disciplinary finding ====
During the parliamentary term, in January 2016, a large banner reading "Zuma Must Fall" was hung from a high-rise apartment building on Long Street, Cape Town; Mkongi called on social media to burn down the banner and building, accepting that the inhabitants of the building "must burn to death". Though Mkongi withdrew the statement and apologised later the same day, the opposition Congress of the People, through its spokesperson Dennis Bloem, called for Mkongi to be arrested. Describing Mkongi's remarks as tantamount to hate speech and incitement to violence, Democratic Alliance (DA) chief whip John Steenhuisen laid a formal complaint against him. A spokesman for the ANC's parliamentary caucus agreed that the statement was "problematic", "totally against what the ANC stands for", and reasonably construed as incitement; he said that Mkongi's retraction had been on the party's instructions. In March 2016, after considering the DA's complaint, Parliament's Joint Committee on Ethics and Members' Interests recommended formal sanctions against Mkongi; it recommended a fine of seven days' salary, an official reprimand in the house, and mandatory training on ethical social media usage.

==== Deputy Minister of Police ====
When President Jacob Zuma announced a major reshuffle of his second-term cabinet in the early hours of 31 March 2017, he named Mkongi as Deputy Minister of Police. He deputised Mbalula, his former boss, who had been named as Minister of Police. The South African Policing Union welcomed their appointments. Mkongi remained in his deputy ministerial office until the end of the parliamentary term, though Mbalula left the ministry to become ANC secretary-general at the end of 2017; President Cyril Ramaphosa, who succeeded Zuma as president in 2018 and announced a new cabinet, named Bheki Cele as the new Minister of Police but retained Mkongi in his position.

Several of Mkongi's public statements garnered public attention in his early months in the police portfolio. He said that tackling obesity in the South African Police Service was among the ministry's portfolios, telling a gathering of officers in East London that, "The nation is mocking you because of your fitness levels." In November 2017, he criticized activism against police brutality and activism for prisoners' rights, saying, "South Africans must choose. If they choose the human rights of criminals, they are choosing Satan, but if they protect the police and those people [victims of crime] they are choosing God." He later called on the police to be "merciless to criminals".

Also in 2017, in an interview with EWN, Mkongi alleged that 80 per cent of inner-city Johannesburg was illegally occupied by foreigners who perpetrated "economic sabotage" by preventing South Africans from living and running businesses in the area; he warned that, "We fought for this land from a white minority, we cannot surrender it to the foreign nationals." His remarks were widely condemned as xenophobic and irresponsible, including by the South African Human Rights Commission. Minister Mbalula said that he understood Mkongi's point but that his statement had been "too rough" and "border[ed] on xenophobia". A clip of the interview went viral again in 2019 during a spate of xenophobic violence, leading a group of African ambassadors to seek assurances from the cabinet that Mkongi would be instructed to recant.

In June 2017, press reported that Mkongi had used public funds to pay for a press conference venue and hotel accommodation related to ANC party business. The DA demanded that Mkongi be instructed to repay the money.

During this period, Mkongi campaigned to succeed Marius Fransman as provincial chairperson of the ANC's Western Cape branch, saying that his experience in the Youth League had prepared him for the position. He was viewed as one of the frontrunners for the position as a candidate favoured by President Zuma's faction in the ANC; most of the other frontrunners, like Ebrahim Rasool and Mcebisi Skwatsha, supported Ramaphosa over Zuma. However, Mkongi's main support base remained the ANC Youth League, which had little organisational presence in the Western Cape, and the party elective conference was in any case delayed for some seven years.

In the May 2019 general election, Mkongi was ranked 173rd on the ANC's national party list and failed to gain re-election to his seat in the National Assembly. Cassel Mathale was appointed to replace him as Deputy Minister of Police.

=== Seventh Parliament: 2024–present ===
In October 2024, in a post on Facebook, Mkongi announced his resignation from the ANC and "all its related structures". He considered the decision "drastic", because he had "spent [his] entire youthful life in the service of the ANC", but said that he intended to join a different political party that promoted the ANC's agenda of National Democratic Revolution.

He joined the Umkhonto weSizwe Party (MK Party), the ANC breakaway recently founded by former president Zuma; MK Party added Mkongi to its candidate lists, and he returned to the National Assembly the following year as an MK representative. He was sworn in on 3 December 2025 to fill the casual vacancy created by Mabel Rweqana's resignation.

== Personal life ==
While Mkongi was serving as deputy police minister, his nephew died in a stabbing in Gugulethu.
