= André Gaum =

South African politician and lawyer

Member of the National Assembly
- In office 4 November 2010 – May 2014
- In office 23 April 2004 – May 2009
- In office June 1999 – December 2001

Personal details
- Citizenship: South Africa
- Party: African National Congress (since 2005); New National Party (1997–2005); National Party (until 1997)
- Education: Stellenbosch University

André Hurtley Gaum is a South African lawyer and politician who is currently serving as a full-time commissioner at the South African Human Rights Commission. He formerly served in the National Assembly, representing the African National Congress (ANC) and before that the New National Party (NNP). He was the Deputy Minister of Education from November 2008 to May 2009.

An admitted advocate and attorney, he entered politics through the National Party and represented the NNP in the National Assembly from 1999 to 2001. From 2001 to 2004, he served in the Western Cape Provincial Parliament as the Western Cape's Member of the Executive Council for Education. Although he returned to Parliament in 2004 on the NNP's list, he defected to the ANC during the 2005 floor-crossing window. He served the ANC in the assembly from 2005 to 2009 and later from 2010 to 2014, before gaining an appointment to the Human Rights Commission in 2017.

== Early life and legal career ==
Gaum attended high school in Wellington in the former Cape Province. His brother is Laurie Gaum, a gay rights activist who is an ordained minister in the Dutch Reformed Church. Their father was also a member of the church, as well as a member of the conservative Afrikaner Broederbond.

In 1991, Gaum completed an LLB and a BA at Stellenbosch University, where he was a member of the student representative council. Later, in 1995, he completed an LLM in constitutional law, also at Stellenbosch. He began work as a state prosecutor in 1992, in the final years of apartheid, but shortly afterwards moved to the Office of the State Attorney, where he served as a legal advisor. During that period he was admitted as an attorney and an advocate of the High Court of South Africa.

While still working for the state attorney, Gaum served part-time as a local councillor in Stellenbosch, representing the National Party (NP). Simultaneously, from 1996 to 1999, he was head of the legal division of the NP, which became the New National Party (NNP) from 1997; he, therefore, advised the party during the drafting of South Africa's post-apartheid Constitution.

== Legislative career: 1999–2014 ==
In the 1999 general election, Gaum was elected to an NNP seat in the National Assembly, representing the Western Cape constituency. The following year, he was appointed to the education portfolio in Tony Leon's shadow cabinet. In December 2001, when Peter Marais was elected as Premier of the Western Cape, Gaum left the National Assembly to join the Western Cape Provincial Parliament as the Western Cape's Member of the Executive Council for Education.

He remained in that office until the next general election in 2004, when he returned to the Western Cape constituency in the National Assembly. On 13 September 2005, during that year's floor-crossing window, he left the NNP to join the ruling African National Congress (ANC). He thereafter served as Deputy Minister of Education from 5 November 2008 until the 2009 general election. He was not initially re-elected to Parliament in the 2009 election and instead he served for a period in 2010 as legal advisor in the office of the Minister of Cooperative Governance and Traditional Affairs, a post then held by Sicelo Shiceka. He was sworn back into the National Assembly on 4 November 2010 when a casual vacancy arose in an ANC seat due to Barbara Hogan's resignation.

== Human Rights Commission: 2017–present ==
Gaum left Parliament after the 2014 general election and subsequently served as a parliamentary liaison officer in the Ministry of Home Affairs. In late 2016, the National Assembly approved his appointment as a full-time commissioner of the South African Human Rights Commission. In 2017 he began a seven-year term as a commissioner with responsibility for basic education.
