= Shadow Cabinet of Tony Leon =

Multi-party opposition coalition

The Shadow Cabinet of Tony Leon was announced on 23 August 2000 and became the Official Opposition Shadow Cabinet of the second democratic Parliament. It was formed as a joint multi-party opposition coalition under the aegis of the Democratic Alliance, which brought together the Democratic Party (DP, elected as the Official Opposition in 1999), the New National Party (NNP), and the smaller Federal Alliance (FA). Democratic Party leader Tony Leon, who led the shadow cabinet, said that the allied parties would no longer issue separate statements on parliamentary matters but would rely on the shadow ministers or spokespersons to speak on behalf of the Democratic Alliance. Leon announced a reshuffle in March 2001.

== Members ==
Shadow Portfolio	Member	Party
Presidency	Tony Leon	DP
Deputy Presidency	Joe Seremane	DP
Finance	Ken Andrew	DP
Foreign Affairs	Colin Eglin	DP
Justice	Tertius Delport	NNP
Correctional Services	Hendrik Schmidt	DP
Safety and Security	Andre Gaum	NNP
Safety and Security	Boy Geldenhuys	NNP
Defence	Hendrik Schmidt	DP
Defence	Hennie Smit	NNP
Intelligence	Martha Olckers	NNP
Agriculture	Kraai van Niekerk	FA
Land Affairs	Dan Maluleke	DP
Water Affairs	Graham McIntosh	DP
Environment	Errol Moorcroft	DP
Public Enterprises	Rudi Heine	DP
Public Enterprises	Raenette Taljaard	DP
Trade and Industry	Nigel Bruce	DP
Labour	Nic Clelland	DP
Labour	Rudi Heine	DP
Transport	Willem Odendaal	NNP
Transport	Keppies Niemann	NNP
Education	Boy Geldenhuys	NNP
Education	Andre Gaum	NNP
Health	Mike Ellis	DP
HIV/AIDS	Kobus Gous	NNP
Public Accounts	Raenette Taljaard	DP
Public Accounts	Willem Odendaal	NNP
Communications and Human Rights	Dene Smuts	DP
Constitutional Development and Provincial Government	Sheila Camerer	DP
Constitutional Development and Provincial Government	Francois Beukman	NNP
Local Government	Gloria Borman	DP
Public Service and Administration	Mike Waters	DP
Public Service and Administration	Mannetjies Grobler	DP
Home Affairs (General)	Francois Beukman	NNP
Home Affairs (General)	Mike Waters	DP
Home Affairs (Electoral Matters)	Sakkie Pretorius	NNP

Additional members in attendance

Position	Member	Party
Parliamentary Leader of the New National Party and deputy spokesman on the Presidency	Marthinus van Schalkwyk	NNP
Opposition Chief Whip in the National Assembly	Douglas Gibson	DP
Chairperson of the parliamentary caucus	Sheila Camerer	DP
