= Pinelands (House of Assembly of South Africa constituency) =

- Former constituency for the South African House of Assembly
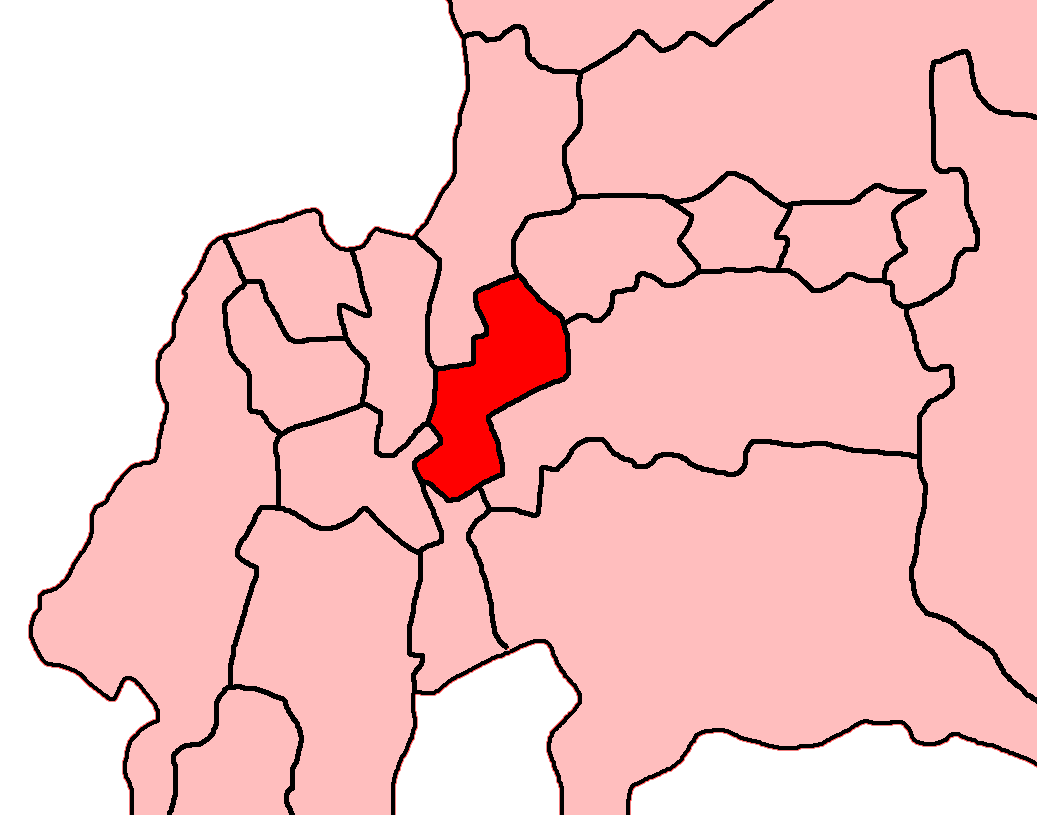
- Location of Pinelands within Cape Town (1981)
- Province: Cape of Good Hope
- Electorate: 15,973 (1989)

Former constituency
- Created: 1953
- Abolished: 1994
- Number of members: 1
- Last MHA: J. J. Walsh (DP)
- Created from: Cape Flats; Rondebosch
- Replaced by: Western Cape

Pinelands was a constituency in the Cape Province of South Africa, which existed from 1953 to 1994. It covered parts of the inner southern and eastern suburbs of Cape Town, centred on its namesake suburb. Throughout its existence it elected one member to the House of Assembly and one to the Cape Provincial Council.

== Franchise notes ==
When the Union of South Africa was formed in 1910, the electoral qualifications in use in each pre-existing colony were kept in place. The Cape Colony had implemented a "colour-blind" franchise known as the Cape Qualified Franchise, which included all adult literate men owning more than £75 worth of property (controversially raised from £25 in 1892), and this initially remained in effect after the colony became the Cape Province. As of 1908, 22,784 out of 152,221 electors in the Cape Colony were "Native or Coloured". Eligibility to serve in Parliament and the Provincial Council, however, was restricted to whites from 1910 onward.

The first challenge to the Cape Qualified Franchise came with the Women's Enfranchisement Act, 1930 and the Franchise Laws Amendment Act, 1931, which extended the vote to women and removed property qualifications for the white population only – non-white voters remained subject to the earlier restrictions. In 1936, the Representation of Natives Act removed all black voters from the common electoral roll and introduced three "Native Representative Members", white MPs elected by the black voters of the province and meant to represent their interests in particular. A similar provision was made for Coloured voters with the Separate Representation of Voters Act, 1951, and although this law was challenged by the courts, it went into effect in time for the 1958 general election, which was thus held with all-white voter rolls for the first time in South African history. The all-white franchise would continue until the end of apartheid and the introduction of universal suffrage in 1994.

== History ==
Pinelands was first formed in 1953, out of parts of the abolished Cape Flats seat along with the eastern areas of Rondebosch (including a large part of the namesake suburb). It covered largely the same area in 1994 as it had on its formation, stretching from Mutual railway station in the north, across the Black River and on to most of eastern Rondebosch and Wyndover.

Pinelands suburb is considered the northernmost of Cape Town's southern suburbs, and like most constituencies in that region, its electorate was largely English-speaking, affluent and liberal. Throughout its history, Pinelands was represented by the main liberal opposition party – first the United Party, then the Progressive Federal Party, and finally the Democratic Party. A young Colin Eglin was one of the seat's first MPs, serving a single term from 1958 to 1961, but lost the seat after defecting to the newly-formed Progressive Party. His successor, J. O. N. Thompson, died in a plane crash just before the 1974 election, causing the election to be delayed, and when it was eventually held, the Progressive Party's Alex Boraine won the seat. He would hold it until 1986, when he resigned alongside PFP leader Frederik van Zyl Slabbert, to fight apartheid from outside parliamentary politics, and later became deputy chairman of the Truth and Reconciliation Commission. He was succeeded as MP for Pinelands by J. J. Walsh, also of the PFP, who held the seat until its abolition in 1994.

== Members ==
Election	Member	Party
1953	R. J. du Toit	United
1958	Colin Eglin	United
1959	Colin Eglin	Progressive
1961	J. O. N. Thompson	United
1966	J. O. N. Thompson	United
1970	J. O. N. Thompson	United
1974	Alex Boraine	Progressive
1977	Alex Boraine	PFP
1981	Alex Boraine	PFP
1987	J. J. Walsh	PFP
1989	J. J. Walsh	Democratic
1994	constituency abolished	
