= Sharon Davids =

South African politician

Sharon Davids MP

Member of the National Assembly of South Africa
- Incumbent
- Assumed office 19 March 2024
- Preceded by: Siphokuhle Patrein

Deputy Provincial Chairperson of the African National Congress in the Western Cape
- Incumbent
- Assumed office 25 June 2023
- Provincial Chairperson: Vuyiso Tyhalisisu
- Preceded by: Khaya Magaxa

Member of the Western Cape Provincial Parliament
- In office 21 May 2014 – 7 May 2019

Personal details
- Party: African National Congress
- Profession: Politician

Sharon Winona Davids is a South African politician and a member of the National Assembly since 2024. A member of the African National Congress (ANC), she has served as the party's deputy provincial chairperson in the Western Cape since June 2023. Prior to her current roles, Davids represented the ANC in the Western Cape Provincial Parliament from 2014 to 2019 and previously served as a councillor in the Drakenstein Local Municipality.

== Political career ==
Davids is a member of the African National Congress. During her tenure as a councillor in the Drakenstein Local Municipality, she was a portfolio member on infrastructure.

Davids was nominated to the Western Cape Provincial Parliament following the general election that was held on 7 May 2014, as she was placed 5th on the ANC's list and the party won 14 seats. She was sworn in as an MPP on 21 May 2014.

Davids was not placed on ANC's provincial list for the 2019 provincial election and left the provincial parliament on 7 May 2019.

Davids was elected deputy provincial chairperson of the ANC structure in the Western Cape during the party's much delayed Provincial Elective Conference held from 23 to 25 June 2023 at the Cape Town International Convention Centre.

Davids was sworn in as a Member of Parliament on 19 March 2024, two months ahead of the general election held on 29 May 2024. She assumed the seat vacated by Siphokuhle Patrein, who had lost her parliamentary membership. Following the election, Davids was elected to serve a full term in the National Assembly.
