= Bernard Joseph (politician) =

South African politician

Member of the Western Cape Provincial Parliament
- In office 21 May 2015 – 7 May 2019

Member of the National Assembly
- In office 21 May 2014 – 20 May 2015
- Constituency: Western Cape

Personal details
- Party: Economic Freedom Fighters
- Other political affiliations: Congress of the People
- Occupation: Politician
- Known for: Being the Chairperson of the Economic Freedom Fighters in the Western Cape.

Bernard Daniel Joseph is a South African politician. A member of the Economic Freedom Fighters, he served as a Member of the Western Cape Provincial Parliament from 2015 to 2019. He was the first chairperson of the party in the Western Cape. From 2014 to 2015, he was a Member of the National Assembly. Before he held elected office, he was an employee at the Western Cape Community Safety Department.

== Political career ==
He was a member of the Congress of the People before he joined the Economic Freedom Fighters. Joseph said that he left the party because he felt that the party lacked leadership and movement. He joined the Economic Freedom Fighters to implement the party's policies.

Before the 2014 South African general election, the Economic Freedom Fighters announced their election lists. Joseph was the first candidate on the party's regional list, third on the party's provincial list and seventy-second on the national list. He was elected to the National Assembly and took office on 21 May 2014.

He resigned as a Member of the National Assembly in May 2015. Joseph was subsequently sworn in as a Member of the Western Cape Provincial Parliament on 21 May 2015. He left the Provincial Parliament in May 2019.
