= Errol Moorcroft =

South African politician (1940–2026)

Federal Chairperson of the Democratic Party
- In office 1997–2000
- Preceded by: Ken Andrew
- Succeeded by: Joe Seremane

Member of the National Assembly of South Africa
- In office 1999–2004
- Constituency: Eastern Cape

Member of the House of Assembly of South Africa
- In office 1989–1994
- Constituency: Albany
- In office 1981–1987
- Constituency: Albany

Personal details
- Born: January 1940 Adelaide, Cape Province, Union of South Africa
- Died: 2 January 2026 (aged 85) South Africa
- Party: Democratic Alliance
- Other political affiliations: Democratic Party; Progressive Federal Party
- Education: Grootfontein College of Agriculture; Rhodes University; University of Oxford

Errol Knott Moorcroft (January 1940 – 2 January 2026) was a South African politician, farmer and author who served as the member for Albany from 1981 to 1994 in the Parliament of South Africa. He later served as the Federal Chairperson of the Democratic Party from 1997 to 2000.

== Early life ==
Moorcroft was born in January 1940 in the rural town of Adelaide, Cape Province (now Eastern Cape) and spent his childhood living on a family farm. He finished his school career at Queen's College Boy's High School located in Queenstown, and soon after graduated from the Grootfontein College of Agriculture in 1959. During his time at the Grootfontein College of Agriculture, he served as the head of the Students Representative Council. He then attended Rhodes University in Grahamstown, graduating with a bachelor of arts degree in 1964. Due to his excellent performance at Rhodes University, Moorcroft was awarded the Abe Bailey Travel Bursary which allowed him to attend the University of Oxford in England. While attending the University of Oxford he played on the university's rugby team. He graduated from the University of Oxford with a Master of Letters (MLitt) degree in 1967.

== Career ==
After graduating from the University of Oxford, Moorcroft returned to South Africa and worked as a lecturer at Rhodes University in 1968 and worked as a full-time farmer from 1969 to 1981. His political career began when he was elected to be the Progressive Federal Party member for Albany in the then-House of Assembly. He later became a Democratic Party member of the Senate of South Africa in 1994 and continued serving until 1999 in the National Council of Provinces.

He succeeded Ken Andrew as the federal chairperson of the Democratic Party in 1997 and returned to the National Assembly in 1999; serving as the Shadow Minister of the Environment in the Shadow Cabinet of Tony Leon. He was later the Democratic Alliance spokesperson on Agriculture, Land Affairs, Tourism, Water Affairs, and Forestry, but retired from politics in 2004 to once again practice farming.

== Personal life and death ==
Moorcroft resided in the Eastern Cape. In 2018, he published his book The Wool-Classer, the Shearers, and the Golden Fleece. He died on 2 January 2026, at the age of 85.
