= Freddie Adams =

South African retired politicians

Member of the National Assembly of South Africa
- In office 21 May 2014 – 7 May 2019
- Constituency: Western Cape

Permanent Delegate to the National Council of Provinces
- In office 2003 – 6 May 2014

Personal details
- Party: African National Congress (2005–present)
- Other political affiliations: New National Party (Until 2005)
- Spouse: Millie Paige ross
- Children: Sam Adams, Thomas Adams

Freddie Adams is a South African retired politician. A former member of the New National Party, he joined the National Council of Provinces in 2003. He joined the African National Congress in 2005. After the 2014 election, Adams became a member of the National Assembly. Adams left Parliament at the 2019 election.

== Parliamentary career ==
Adams was the provincial secretary of the New National Party. In 2003, the African National Congress nominated him to be one of their representatives in the National Council of Provinces, the upper house of the South African parliament in terms of a political agreement between the ANC and NNP. After the 2004 general election, Adams was reappointed to the NCOP as the NNP's sole provincial delegate. In October 2004, ANC chief whip Mbulelo Goniwe announced that eight NNP MPs, including Adams, would cross the floor and join the ANC during the floor-crossing period in September of the following year. In August 2005, Adams reiterated that he would join the ANC during the floor-crossing period. After the composition of the Western Cape Provincial Parliament was reconstituted following the floor-crossing period, Adams officially became an ANC representative in the NCOP.

In November 2006, Adams voted for the Civil Union Bill which legalised same-sex marriage in South Africa.

After the 2009 general election, Adams returned to the NCOP. The ANC selected him as their candidate for Chairperson of the Select Committee on Economic Development; he was unanimously elected by committee members.

Adams stood for the National Assembly, the lower house of parliament, as a candidate on the ANC's Western Cape regional-to-national list in the 2014 general election and was elected and sworn in on 21 May 2014. During his tenure in the National Assembly, he was a member of the Portfolio Committee on Public Enterprises and whip of the Portfolio Committee on Public Works. Adams was not placed on any ANC list for the 2019 general election and left parliament at the election.
