= Mzwanele Sokopo =

South African politician

Mzwanele Sokopo MP

Member of the National Assembly of South Africa
- Incumbent
- Assumed office 14 June 2024
- Constituency: Western Cape

Personal details
- Party: African National Congress
- Profession: Politician

Mzwanele Major Sokopo is a South African politician and a Member of Parliament for the African National Congress.

== Political career ==
Sokopo was elected as the regional treasurer of the African National Congress in the Southern Cape in 2011. He was elected as the regional secretary of the party in 2015.

Sokopo stood as an ANC parliamentary candidate from the Western Cape in the 2024 national and provincial elections, and was elected to the National Assembly of South Africa. The ANC appointed him as a party whip.

== Personal life ==
In May 2023, Sokopo and former South African Revenue Service accountant Ndileka Precious Mfunda were acquitted of theft and tax fraud charges, however, they were found guilty of charges contravening the Tax Act by the Thembalethu Regional Court. The court sentenced Sokopo in January 2024 to two and a half years imprisonment, alternatively allowing him to pay a R20,000 fine, along with an additional payment of R4,000.
