= Albany (House of Assembly of South Africa constituency) =

Constituency in the Cape Province of South Africa, 1910–1994

- Albanie
- Former constituency for the South African House of Assembly
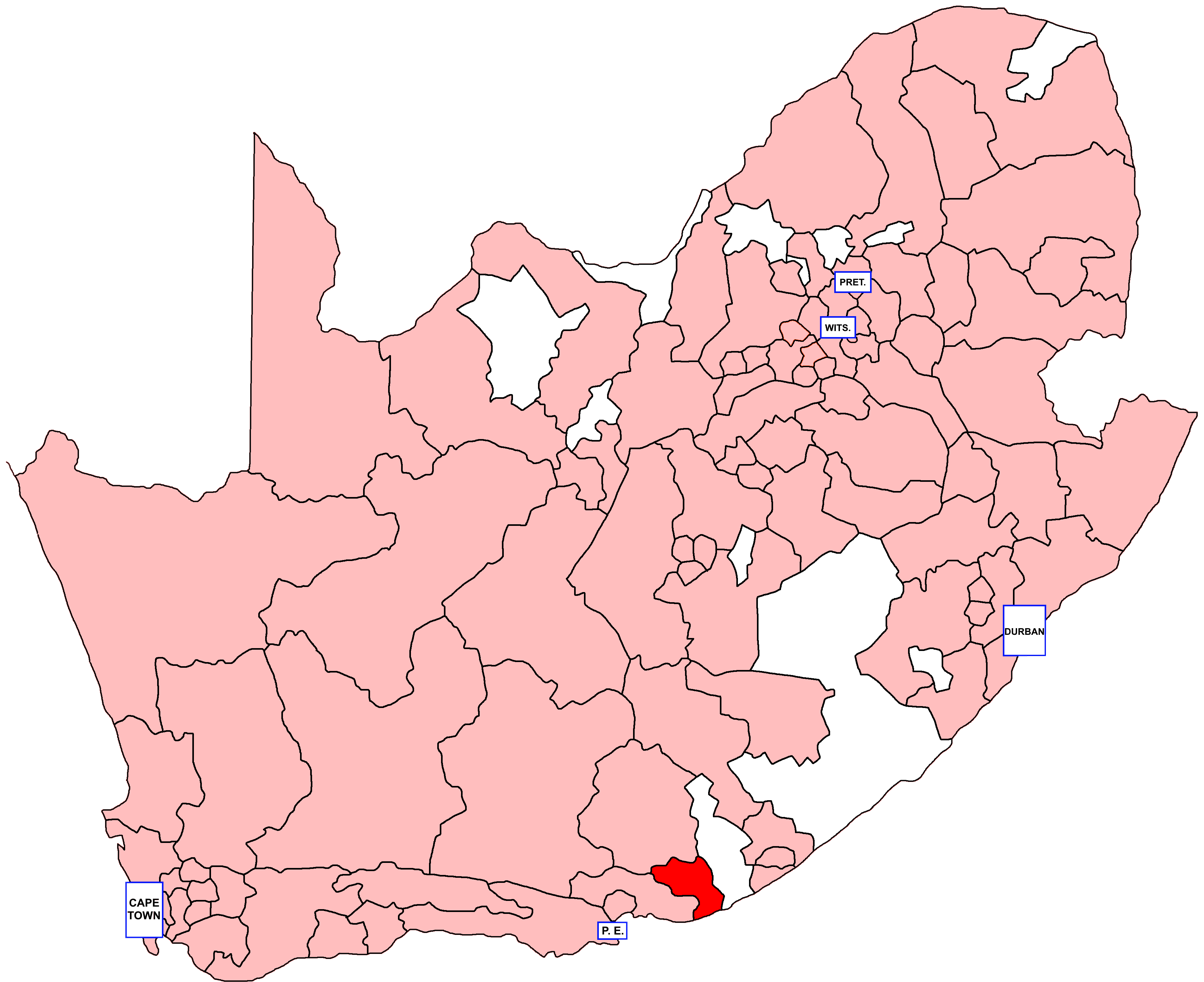
- Location of Albany within South Africa (1981)
- Province: Cape of Good Hope
- Electorate: 16,609 (1989)

Former constituency
- Created: 1910
- Abolished: 1994
- Number of members: 1
- Last MHA: Errol Moorcroft (DP)
- Replaced by: Eastern Cape

Albany (Afrikaans: Albanie) was a constituency in the Cape Province of South Africa, which existed from 1910 to 1994. It was named after the district of Albany, which covered parts of today's Eastern Cape province, and its main population centre was Grahamstown (today known as Makhanda). Throughout this time it elected one member to the House of Assembly and one to the Cape Provincial Council.

== Franchise notes ==
When the Union of South Africa was formed in 1910, the electoral qualifications in use in each pre-existing colony were kept in place. The Cape Colony had implemented a “colour-blind” franchise known as the Cape Qualified Franchise, which included all adult literate men owning more than £75 worth of property (controversially raised from £25 in 1892), and this initially remained in effect after the colony became the Cape Province. As of 1908, 22,784 out of 152,221 electors in the Cape Colony were “Native or Coloured”. Eligibility to serve in Parliament and the Provincial Council, however, was restricted to whites from 1910 onward.

The first challenge to the Cape Qualified Franchise came with the Women's Enfranchisement Act, 1930 and the Franchise Laws Amendment Act, 1931, which extended the vote to women and removed property qualifications for the white population only – non-white voters remained subject to the earlier restrictions. In 1936, the Representation of Natives Act removed all black voters from the common electoral roll and introduced three "Native Representative Members", white MPs elected by the black voters of the province and meant to represent their interests in particular. A similar provision was made for Coloured voters with the Separate Representation of Voters Act, 1951, and although this law was challenged by the courts, it went into effect in time for the 1958 general election, which was thus held with all-white voter rolls for the first time in South African history. The all-white franchise would continue until the end of apartheid and the introduction of universal suffrage in 1994.

== History ==
The seat was a stronghold for the United Party and its predecessors, who held the seat from its creation until the party's collapse in the 1970s. Its first MP was Leander Starr Jameson, leader of the Unionist Party, who won it unopposed in the first general election, and uncontested elections were the norm throughout the seat's early existence – the South African Party contested it in 1915, the Dominion Party at the 1936 by-election, and the National Party in 1953, but other than that the seat was only contested by independents for the first fifty years of its existence.

Starting from 1966, the National Party began contesting Albany regularly, but the UP maintained enough of a hold on the seat that it only ever became marginal. Errol Moorcroft, Albany's final MP, first won the seat in 1981, initially representing the Progressive Federal Party and later joining the Democratic Party (DP). He was defeated by the National Party's J. H. van de Vyver in 1987, but returned in 1989. In this, the last election held under apartheid and with a first-past-the-post electoral system, it was the only rural seat in the Cape to be won by the DP.

== Members ==
Election	Member	Party
1910	Leander Starr Jameson	Unionist
1915	Frederick van der Riet	Unionist
1920	Frederick van der Riet	Unionist
1921	Frederick van der Riet	South African
1923 by	Henry Fitchat	South African
1924	R. H. Struben	South African
1929	R. H. Struben	South African
1933	R. H. Struben	South African
1936 by	T. B. Bowker	United Party
1938	T. B. Bowker	United Party
1943	T. B. Bowker	United Party
1948	T. B. Bowker	United Party
1953	T. B. Bowker	United Party
1958	T. B. Bowker	United Party
1961	Colin Bennett	United Party
1966	William Deacon	United Party
1970	William Deacon	United Party
1974	William Deacon	United Party
1977	R. de V. Olckers	National
1981	Errol Moorcroft	PFP
1987	J. H. van de Wyver	National
1989	Errol Moorcroft	Democratic
1994	constituency abolished	

== Detailed results ==
=== Elections in the 1910s ===
General election 1910: Albany
Party	Candidate	Votes	%	±%
Unionist	Leander Starr Jameson	Unopposed		
Unionist win (new seat)				

General election 1915: Albany
Party	Candidate	Votes	%	±%
Unionist	Frederick van der Riet	1,196	51.8	N/A
South African	W. M. Espin	1,111	48.2	New
Majority		85	3.6	N/A
Turnout		2,307	69.8	N/A
Unionist hold		Swing	N/A	

=== Elections in the 1920s ===
General election 1920: Albany
Party	Candidate	Votes	%	±%
Unionist	Frederick van der Riet	Unopposed		
Unionist hold				

General election 1921: Albany
Party	Candidate	Votes	%	±%
South African	Frederick van der Riet	Unopposed		
South African hold				

Albany by-election, 20 March 1923
Party	Candidate	Votes	%	±%
South African	Henry Fitchat	1,327	54.3	N/A
Independent	F. G. Reynolds	1,087	44.5	New
Rejected ballots		28	1.2	N/A
Majority		240	9.8	N/A
Turnout		2,442	64.1	N/A
South African hold		Swing	N/A	

General election 1924: Albany
Party	Candidate	Votes	%	±%
South African	R. H. Struben	1,744	58.2	N/A
Independent	F. G. Reynolds	1,225	40.8	New
Rejected ballots		29	1.0	N/A
Majority		519	17.4	N/A
Turnout		2,998	82.1	N/A
South African hold		Swing	N/A	

General election 1929: Albany
Party	Candidate	Votes	%	±%
South African	R. H. Struben	Unopposed		
South African hold				

=== Elections in the 1930s ===
General election 1933: Albany
Party	Candidate	Votes	%	±%
South African	R. H. Struben	Unopposed		
South African hold				

Albany by-election, 6 May 1936
Party	Candidate	Votes	%	±%
United	T. B. Bowker	3,294	58.1	New
Dominion	J. C. Rae	2,338	41.3	New
Rejected ballots		35	0.6	N/A
Majority		956	16.9	N/A
Turnout		5,667	79.8	N/A
United gain from South African		Swing	N/A	

General election 1938: Albany
Party	Candidate	Votes	%	±%
United	T. B. Bowker	Unopposed		
United hold				

=== Elections in the 1940s ===
General election 1943: Albany
Party	Candidate	Votes	%	±%
United	T. B. Bowker	Unopposed		
United hold				

General election 1948: Albany
Party	Candidate	Votes	%	±%
United	T. B. Bowker	5,471	73.3	N/A
Independent	J. V. Buchner	1,989	26.7	New
Majority		3,482	46.6	N/A
Turnout		9,563	79.3	N/A
United hold		Swing	N/A	
