= Kobus Gous =

South African politician (born 1953)

Member of the National Assembly
- In office until April 2004
- Constituency: Gauteng

Personal details
- Born: Sarel Jacobus Gous; 24 March 1953 (age 71)
- Citizenship: South Africa
- Political party: New National Party; National Party

Sarel Jacobus "Kobus" Gous (born 24 March 1953) is a retired South African politician who represented the National Party (NP) and New National Party (NNP) in the National Assembly until 2004. He joined during the first democratic Parliament and represented the Gauteng caucus. He was also the NNP's spokesman on health.

== Legislative career ==
Gous was not initially elected to a seat in South Africa's first post-apartheid elections in 1994, but he was sworn in during the term to fill a casual vacancy in an NP seat. He was narrowly re-elected in 1999, representing the recently renamed NNP in the Gauteng caucus.

In 2000, the NNP joined the multi-party Democratic Alliance (DA), and DA leader Tony Leon appointed Gous to his shadow cabinet as one of the alliance's spokespersons on health, with a focus on HIV/AIDS. The NNP's participation in the alliance was short-lived and, after its departure, Gous served as health spokesperson for the NNP alone. Although the Mail & Guardian reported that he was courted by several rival parties, including the DA, he continued to represent the NNP until after the 2004 general election, when he left Parliament.
