= Faiez Jacobs =

South African politician

Member of the National Assembly of South Africa
- In office 22 May 2019 – 28 May 2024
- Constituency: Western Cape

Secretary of the Western Cape African National Congress
- In office 28 June 2015 – August 2019
- Preceded by: Songezo Mjongile
- Succeeded by: Nelville Delport

Personal details
- Born: 12 January 1973 (age 53)
- Party: African National Congress
- Occupation: Member of Parliament
- Profession: Politician
- Committees: Portfolio Committee on Small Business Development

Faiez Jacobs (born 12 January 1973) is a South African politician who served as a Member of the National Assembly of South Africa for the African National Congress (ANC) from 2019 until 2024. Jacobs was the Secretary of the provincial ANC in the Western Cape from 2015 until the dissolution of the provincial structure in 2019.

Jacobs, along with other ANC provincial leaders, was placed too low on the party's list to secure re-election to Parliament in the 2024 general election.
