= Sakkie Pretorius =

South African politician (born 1945)

Member of the National Assembly
- In office May 1994 – April 2004
- Constituency: Western Cape

Personal details
- Born: Izak Jacobus Pretorius; 8 January 1945 (age 81)
- Citizenship: South Africa
- Party: Democratic Alliance
- Other political affiliations: New National Party; National Party

Izak Jacobus "Sakkie" Pretorius (born 8 January 1945) is a retired South African politician from the Western Cape. He served in the National Assembly from 1994 to 2004, representing the Western Cape constituency. He was later elected as a local councillor in the City of Cape Town.

During apartheid, Pretorius was an organiser for the National Party (NP) under President P. W. Botha. He remained with the party until March 2003, when he crossed the floor to join the Democratic Alliance (DA).

== Early life and career ==
Pretorius was born on 8 January 1945. He was an organiser for the NP during the presidency of P. W. Botha, including as general-secretary for the party's branch in the Cape Province.

== Legislative career: 1994–2004 ==
In South Africa's first post-apartheid elections in 1994, Pretorius was elected to represent the NP in the new National Assembly. He was re-elected in 1999, representing the recently renamed New National Party (NNP) in the Western Cape caucus. He served for a period as the NNP's chief whip, and he was the election agent on Marthinus van Schalkwyk's successful campaign for election as NNP leader in 1997.

In 2000, the NNP joined the DA – then a multi-party coalition rather than a formal political party – and DA leader Tony Leon appointed Pretorius to his shadow cabinet as one of the coalition's spokespersons on home affairs, focusing on electoral matters. The NNP's participation in the coalition was short-lived, but the Mail & Guardian reported in 2002 that the DA was wooing Pretorius to leave the NNP. According to the newspaper, he was expected to remain loyal.

It was therefore viewed as surprising when, during the March 2003 floor-crossing window, Pretorius announced that he was among a large contingent of NNP members, led by Sheila Camerer, who had resigned from the NNP to join the DA. Serving the rest of the parliamentary term under the DA banner, Pretorius reprised his role as DA spokesperson on home affairs. He left Parliament after the 2004 general election, in which he was ranked low on the DA's party list.

== Local government ==
Ahead of the 2006 local government elections, the DA nominated Pretorius as its candidate for election as ward councillor for Parow in the City of Cape Town council, and he was elected to the council. He supported Helen Zille's successful bid to become DA leader in 2007.
