= Helen Suzman Foundation =

Independent, non-partisan think-tank in South Africa

- Company type: Promotion of liberal democracy
- Founded: 1993; 32 years ago in Johannesburg, South Africa
- Number of employees: 13 staff 20 research fellows 11 trustees (2019)
- Website: hsf.org.za

The Helen Suzman Foundation is an independent, non-partisan think tank in South Africa dedicated to promoting liberal democratic values and human rights in post-apartheid South Africa through its research, publications, litigation and submissions to the South African Parliament.

The foundation was established in honour of Helen Suzman, a long-time liberal opposition MP who opposed apartheid in the South African parliament and the foundation's patron. Its liberalism is grounded in Helen’s legacy, and draws from the history of liberal thought in South Africa.

The foundation believes that the Constitution of South Africa is a liberal document. In its preamble the Constitution calls for “a society based on democratic values, social justice and fundamental human rights”, which aims to “free the potential of each person” and where “every citizen is equally protected by law”.

The foundation publishes opinion pieces on its website, in a quarterly electronic magazine, Focus, and via email.

Academic R. W. Johnson was the foundation's first director until he resigned in 1995. Johnson's successor at the foundation, Lawrence Schlemmer, In 2006, Raenette Taljaard succeeded Schlemmer to become the foundation's director. She, in turn, was succeeded by Francis Antonie in 2010. Francis Antonie served as director from 2010 until he was replaced by Nicole Fritz, who took over the reins in 2022. Nicole Fritz resigned in December 2023. Naseema Fakir is currently the Executive Director.
