= Cape Flats (House of Assembly of South Africa constituency) =

- Kaapse Vlakte
- Former constituency for the South African House of Assembly
- Province: Cape of Good Hope

Former constituency
- Created: 1929
- Abolished: 1958
- Number of members: 1
- Last MHA: C. G. Starke (UP)
- Created from: South Peninsula

Cape Flats (Afrikaans: Kaapse Vlakte) was a constituency in the Cape Province of South Africa, which existed from 1929 to 1933 and again from 1938 to 1958. It covered a large part of Cape Town’s eastern suburbs. Throughout its existence it elected one member to the House of Assembly and one to the Cape Provincial Council.

== Franchise notes ==
When the Union of South Africa was formed in 1910, the electoral qualifications in use in each pre-existing colony were kept in place. The Cape Colony had implemented a "colour-blind" franchise known as the Cape Qualified Franchise, which included all adult literate men owning more than £75 worth of property (controversially raised from £25 in 1892), and this initially remained in effect after the colony became the Cape Province. As of 1908, 22,784 out of 152,221 electors in the Cape Colony were "Native or Coloured". Eligibility to serve in Parliament and the provincial council, however, was restricted to whites from 1910 onward.

The first challenge to the Cape Qualified Franchise came with the Women's Enfranchisement Act, 1930 and the Franchise Laws Amendment Act, 1931, which extended the vote to women and removed property qualifications for the white population only – non-white voters remained subject to the earlier restrictions. In 1936, the Representation of Natives Act removed all black voters from the common electoral roll and introduced three "Native Representative Members", white MPs elected by the black voters of the province and meant to represent their interests in particular. A similar provision was made for Coloured voters with the Separate Representation of Voters Act, 1951, and although this law was challenged by the courts, it went into effect in time for the 1958 general election, which was thus held with all-white voter rolls for the first time in South African history. The all-white franchise would continue until the end of apartheid and the introduction of universal suffrage in 1994.

== History ==
Cape Flats was first created for the 1929 general election, largely out of the eastern parts of the South Peninsula seat. At the time, it was a South African Party-leaning marginal seat, and SAP candidate A. J. Chiappini was elected to represent it for what would turn out to be its entire first period of existence.

The constituency was recreated in 1938, and won by R. J. du Toit, a follower of Jan Smuts and member of the United Party who had previously represented Maitland. He would hold it for most of its second period of existence, moving to the newly-created seat of Pinelands in 1953. The rump Cape Flats seat was held by the UP under C. G. Starke, who was opposed by the first National Party candidate in the seat since 1929. In 1958, the seat was abolished without a clear successor, though the Tygervallei constituency (created in 1966) was somewhat similar.

== Members ==
Election	Member	Party
1929	A. J. Chiappini	South African
1933	constituency abolished	

Election	Member	Party
1938	R. J. du Toit	United
1943	R. J. du Toit	United
1948	R. J. du Toit	United
1953	C. G. Starke	United
1958	constituency abolished	

== Detailed results ==
=== Elections in the 1920s ===
General election 1929: Cape Flats
Party	Candidate	Votes	%	±%
South African	A. J. Chiappini	1,719	54.9	New
National	W. McGregor	1,186	37.8	New
Independent	D. G. Wolton	93	3.0	New
Independent	P. J. Wolmarans	84	2.7	New
Rejected ballots		52	1.7	N/A
Majority		533	17.1	N/A
Turnout		3,134	75.6	N/A
South African win (new seat)				

=== Elections in the 1930s ===
General election 1938: Cape Flats
Party	Candidate	Votes	%	±%
United	R. J. du Toit	3,289	51.9	New
Greyshirt	W. R. Laubscher	1,407	22.2	New
Labour	J. W. Emmerich	950	15.0	New
Dominion	H. E. Sedgwick	637	10.1	New
Rejected ballots		51	0.7	N/A
Majority		1,882	29.7	N/A
Turnout		6,334	73.6	N/A
United win (new seat)				

=== Elections in the 1940s ===
General election 1943: Cape Flats
Party	Candidate	Votes	%	±%
United	R. J. du Toit	4,559	66.1	+13.8
Independent	A. G. H. Loubser	1,174	17.0	New
South African Communist Party	J. H. Fourie	1,165	16.9	New
Majority		3,385	49.1	N/A
Turnout		6,898	82.4	+8.8
United hold		Swing	N/A	
