= Windy Plaatjies =

South African politician

Windy Plaatjies MP

Member of the National Assembly of South Africa
- Incumbent
- Assumed office 14 June 2024
- Constituency: Western Cape

Personal details
- Born: Windy Timotheus David Plaatjies
- Party: African National Congress
- Profession: Politician

Windy Timotheus David Plaatjies is a South African politician and a Member of Parliament for the African National Congress.

== Political career ==
Plaatjies served as the regional secretary of the African National Congress in the party's Central Karoo region, having been reelected in 2018. He was serving as the regional chairperson by March 2025.

Plaatjies was elected to the National Assembly of South Africa in the 2024 general election, having been ranked second on the ANC's Western Cape regional to national list. Following his swearing in, he was appointed to serve on the Joint Standing Committee on Defence.

== Personal life ==
On 4 October 2015, Plaatjies was shot in the shoulder while attempting to break up a fight in a tavern in Kwa-Mandlenkosi outside Beaufort West. A 24-year-old was arrested in connection to the shooting.
