= Rudi Heine =

South African politician

Member of the National Assembly
- In office June 1999 – April 2004
- Constituency: KwaZulu-Natal

Personal details
- Born: 29 September 1934 (age 91)
- Citizenship: South Africa
- Party: Democratic Alliance; Democratic Party

Rudolph Jacobs "Rudi" Heine (born 29 September 1934) is a retired South African politician who represented the Democratic Party (DP) in the National Assembly from 1999 to 2004, serving the KwaZulu-Natal constituency. In August 2000, he was appointed as spokesman on labour for the newly founded Democratic Alliance; he remained in that position until March 2001, when he was appointed to replace Raenette Taljaard as the alliance's spokesman on public enterprises. He left Parliament after the 2004 general election.
