= Willem Odendaal =

South African politician (born 1944)

Member of the National Assembly
- In office 9 May 1994 – April 2004
- Constituency: Free State

Personal details
- Born: Willem Adriaan Odendaal; 7 December 1944 (age 81)
- Citizenship: South Africa
- Party: New National Party; National Party

Willem Adriaan Odendaal (born 7 December 1944) is a retired South African politician from the Free State. He represented the National Party (NP) and New National Party (NNP) in the National Assembly from 1994 to 2004.

== Legislative career ==
Odendaal was elected to an NP seat in the National Assembly in the 1994 general election and gained re-election in 1999, representing the Free State constituency. In 1997, he apologised for remarks he had made in a parliamentary debate: he had asked Andrew Feinstein of the African National Congress whether he was Jewish and then explained his question with the comment, "A Jew and a Communist together – that spells trouble."

In 2000, Odendaal's party, by then restyled as the NNP, joined the multi-party Democratic Alliance (DA) and DA leader Tony Leon appointed Odendaal to his shadow cabinet as the alliance's spokesman on public accounts. In a reshuffle in March 2001, he was succeeded in that portfolio by Raenette Taljaard and became spokesman on transport. After the NNP's acrimonious departure from the DA, he served as the NNP's spokesman on land affairs and later on finance.

Odendaal retired at the 2004 general election. In his final speech to the house before the National Assembly closed for the election, he recapitulated the NNP's opposition to social grants and concluded by describing the DA as the "racist, ugly face of capitalism".
