= Lawrence Maduma =

South African politician

Member of the National Assembly
- In office 23 April 2004 – May 2009
- Constituency: Western Cape

Personal details
- Born: Lawrence Daluxolo Maduma; 25 January 1952 (age 74)
- Citizenship: South Africa
- Party: African National Congress

Lawrence Daluxolo Maduma (born 25 January 1952) is a South African politician who represented the African National Congress (ANC) in the National Assembly from 2004 to 2009. He was elected by the Western Cape constituency in 2004. He is a former provincial secretary of the South African Communist Party in the Western Cape.
