= Anna van Wyk =

South African politician (born 1942)

Member of the National Assembly
- In office May 1994 – April 2004
- Constituency: Western Cape

Personal details
- Born: 4 September 1942 (age 83)
- Citizenship: South Africa
- Party: New National Party; National Party

Anna van Wyk (born 4 September 1942) is a retired South African politician who represented the National Party (NP) and New National Party (NNP) in the National Assembly from 1994 to 2004, serving the Western Cape constituency. She failed to gain re-election in the 2004 general election.

== Early life and career ==
Van Wyk was born on 4 September 1942. She was formerly an adviser to F. W. de Klerk while he was leader of the NP.

== Post-apartheid legislative career ==
In South Africa's first post-apartheid elections in 1994, van Wyk was elected to represent the NP in the new National Assembly. After gaining re-election in 1999, she served as the NNP's spokesperson on arts and culture and later on communications.

In mid-2000, the Mail & Guardian reported that van Wyk had met with the Inkatha Freedom Party about possibly defecting during the next floor-crossing window, but van Wyk remained with the NNP. However, in the 2004 general election, the party performed very poorly and she did not secure re-election to her seat.
