= Hennie Smit =

South African politician (born 1949)

Member of the National Assembly
- In office May 1994 – December 2001
- Constituency: Western Cape

Member of Parliament for George
- In office 29 November 1984 – April 1994
- Preceded by: P. W. Botha
- Succeeded by: Constituency abolished

Personal details
- Born: Hendrik Albertyn Smit; 19 April 1949 (age 77)
- Citizenship: South Africa
- Party: New National Party; National Party

Hendrik Albertyn Smit (born 19 April 1949) is a South African politician. He represented the New National Party (NNP) in the National Assembly from 1994 to 2001, serving the Western Cape constituency. Before that, he represented the National Party (NP) in the apartheid-era House of Assembly.

== Early life and career ==
Born on 19 April 1949, Smit formerly represented the NP in the all-white House of Assembly. He succeeded former president P. W. Botha as the representative for the constituency of George in the Western Cape.

== Post-apartheid legislative career ==
=== National Assembly ===
In South Africa's first post-apartheid elections in 1994, Smit was elected to represent the NP in the new multi-racial National Assembly. He served as the party's chief whip during the legislative term that followed. In addition, he was chairperson of the NP's regional branch in the Southern Cape.

Smit was re-elected to the National Assembly in the 1999 general election, representing the Western Cape constituency. The following year, the NP (newly restyled as the NNP) joined the multi-party Democratic Alliance (DA) with the Democratic Party. Smit became chairperson of the DA's Southern Cape regional branch and was appointed to the shadow cabinet of DA leader Tony Leon, becoming the alliance's spokesman on defence. He was removed from the latter position after six months, in a March 2001 reshuffle by Leon.

=== Provincial legislature ===
The NNP's participation in the DA was short-lived. At the end of 2001, when the NNP abandoned the alliance to enter into cooperation with the African National Congress (ANC), Smit resigned from the National Assembly in order to join the Western Cape Provincial Legislature, where he, with the ANC's Garth Strachan, was co-chief whip of the NNP/ANC caucus. He left the legislature after the 2004 general election, although he continued to serve as financial chairperson of the NNP's provincial branch. The DA claimed that, in a nepotistic arrangement, DA representatives were arranging for Smit to take up a job in the City of Cape Town Municipality.
