= Thandi Makasi =

South African politician (born 1976)

The Honourable Thandi Makasi

Member of the National Assembly

Assembly Member for Western Cape
- Incumbent
- Assumed office 14 June 2024

Personal details
- Born: 19 April 1976 (age 50)
- Party: African National Congress

Noluthando Makasi (born 19 April 1976) is a South African politician from the Western Cape who has represented the African National Congress (ANC) in the National Assembly since June 2024. She formerly represented the party as a local councillor in the City of Cape Town Metropolitan Municipality.
