= Mabel Rweqana =

South African politician

Member of the National Assembly of South Africa
- In office 21 August 2024 – 13 February 2026
- Succeeded by: Bongani Mkongi

Personal details
- Party: uMkhonto weSizwe Party

Mabel Rweqana is a South African politician who was a member of parliament (MP) for the uMkhonto weSizwe Party (MK). She is president of the MK Women's League.

Rweqana was previously a member of the uMkhonto we Sizwe Military Veterans' Association (MKMVA) .

== See also ==
- List of National Assembly members of the 28th Parliament of South Africa
