= Kabelo Kgobisa-Ngcaba =

South African politician and communications consultant

Kabelo Kgobisa-Ngcaba MP

Member of the National Assembly of South Africa
- Incumbent
- Assumed office 14 June 2024
- Constituency: Western Cape

Personal details
- Party: Democratic Alliance
- Education: University of Cape Town (B.Soc.Sci, LLB)

Kabelo Kgobisa-Ngcaba is a South African politician and communications consultant who has been a Member of the National Assembly of South Africa since 2024, representing the Democratic Alliance.

== Background ==
Kgobisa-Ngcaba studied at the University of Cape Town from which she graduated with a Bachelor of Social Sciences, majoring in Political science, Sociology and Gender studies in 2011 before graduating with a Bachelor of Laws in 2015. She completed her articles at Lawyers for Human Rights between 2016 and 2018, when she started working as a researcher for the Democratic Alliance until May 2019. In June 2019, she started working as an account manager at Resolve Communications. She was promoted to an account director in December 2022 before she became the company's chief Operations Officer in January 2024.

== Political career ==
Kgobisa-Ngcaba argued in an opinion piece in May 2023 that the ANC was "gaslighting" black South Africans with the Employment Equity Amendment Act and that it "is clear from the employment equity and BEE measures implemented in the past that this legislation won’t create jobs."

Prior to the 2024 general election, Kgobisa-Ngcaba was one of eleven candidates who were present at the DA's candidate lists announcement in March 2024. The party described them as "new exciting candidates that reflect the DA vision and principles" She was elected to the National Assembly of South Africa at the election, having been ranked 5th on the party's regional list. Since becoming an MP, Kgobisa-Ngcaba has been a member of the Portfolio Committee on Justice and Constitutional Development.
