= Sydney Opperman =

South African politician

Member of the National Assembly
- In office June 1999 – May 2009
- Constituency: Western Cape

Personal details
- Born: Sydney Edward Opperman; 25 June 1942 (age 83)
- Citizenship: South Africa
- Party: Democratic Alliance; Democratic Party

Sydney Edward Opperman (born 25 June 1942) is a retired South African politician from the Western Cape. He represented the Democratic Party and Democratic Alliance (DA) in the National Assembly from 1999 to 2009, gaining election to the Western Cape caucus in 1999 and 2004.

During his second term, Opperman was the DA's spokesman on public works and land affairs, in which capacity he spearheaded the party's opposition to the Expropriation Bill. In 2008, he protested the bill by staging a walkout from parliamentary public hearings on the legislation.
