= Wilhelm le Roux =

South African politician (born 1939)

Delegate to the National Council of Provinces

Assembly Member for Eastern Cape
- In office April 2004 – May 2009

Member of the National Assembly
- In office 2001 – April 2004
- In office May 1994 – June 1999

Personal details
- Born: Jacobus Wilhelmus le Roux; 21 July 1939 (age 86)
- Citizenship: South Africa
- Party: Democratic Alliance (since March 2003)
- Other political affiliations: New National Party; National Party

Jacobus Wilhelmus le Roux (born 21 July 1939) is a retired South African politician from the Eastern Cape. He served in the National Assembly from 1994 to 1999 and from 2001 to 2004, and he later served a term in the National Council of Provinces from 2004 to 2009.

Formerly a representative of the National Party (NP) in the apartheid-era House of Assembly, le Roux was the provincial leader of the New National Party (NNP) in the Eastern Cape until March 2003, when he crossed the floor to the Democratic Alliance (DA).

== Legislative career ==
Born on 21 July 1939, le Roux represented the Uitenhage constituency in the all-white House of Assembly before 1994. In South Africa's first post-apartheid elections in 1994, he was elected to represent the NP (soon restyled as the NNP) in the new multi-racial National Assembly.

He stood for re-election in the next general election in 1999 but narrowly missed re-election: though he was ranked third on the NNP's party list for the Eastern Cape, the party won only two seats in the constituency. However, he returned to the National Assembly in 2001, filling a casual vacancy. By 2002, he was rumoured to be considering crossing the floor to another opposition party, and, indeed, he announced his defection to the DA during the March 2003 floor-crossing window. At the time of his defection, he was provincial leader of the NNP's Eastern Cape branch.

After serving the rest of the legislative term under the DA banner, le Roux stood for the DA in the 2004 general election and was elected as the party's sole representative in the Eastern Cape caucus of the National Council of Provinces. He was a member of the Select Committee on Security and Constitutional Affairs.
