= Raenette Taljaard =

South African politician and academic

Member of the National Assembly
- In office June 1999 – 1 January 2005
- Constituency: Gauteng

Personal details
- Born: 4 July 1972 (age 54)
- Citizenship: South Africa
- Party: Democratic Alliance (2003–5); Democratic Party (until 2003)
- Education: Rand Afrikaans University; London School of Economics; Stellenbosch University (PhD)

Raenette Taljaard (born 4 July 1972), also known as Raenette Gottardo, is a South African academic and former politician. She represented the Democratic Party (DP) and Democratic Alliance (DA) in the National Assembly from June 1999 until her resignation at the end of 2004. She later served stints as director of the Helen Suzman Foundation and as a member of the Electoral Commission of South Africa.

Under party leader Tony Leon, Taljaard was Shadow Minister of Public Enterprises and later Shadow Minister for Finance. She was best known for her tenure in the Standing Committee of Public Accounts from 2001 to 2002, where she was a leading critic of the Arms Deal. Though Taljaard was widely viewed as among the DA's most promising politicians, Leon had to intervene to secure her place on the party list in the 2004 general election. Her relationship with Leon and other senior DA leaders deteriorated thereafter, and in November 2004 she announced her resignation from the party, from Parliament, and from frontline politics.

In subsequent years, Taljaard lectured in politics at the University of Cape Town and University of the Witwatersrand. She was director of the Helen Suzman Foundation from 2006 to 2009 and served half a term at the Electoral Commission from 2011 until 2015, when she resigned to concentrate on her academic career.

== Early life and career ==
Taljaard was born on 4 July 1972. She was raised in an Afrikaans-speaking home on the West Rand in the former Transvaal and attended an Afrikaans-medium school, Vorentoe High School, in Auckland Park. She went on attend Rand Afrikaans University, where she completed a bachelor's in law, an honours in political science, and a master's in political science, and later the London School of Economics, where she completed a master's in public administration and public policy.

While in London, Taljaard met with Tony Leon and Colin Eglin of the Democratic Party (DP). After graduating she joined the party as a researcher and in 1999 became a speechwriter for Leon, who was party leader, during the DP's campaign ahead of that year's general election.

== Parliament ==
Leon persuaded Taljaard to stand for election to Parliament, and in the 1999 election she was elected to a DP seat in the National Assembly, serving the Gauteng constituency. She was the youngest woman ever elected to Parliament, and over the next few years she was frequently referred to as a "rising star" in the opposition.

In August 2000, when the Democratic Alliance (DA) was established as an opposition coalition between the DP and New National Party, Leon appointed Taljaard as shadow minister for public enterprises. In this capacity, she served as the DP's spokesperson on and ranking member of the Portfolio Committee on Public Enterprises. Despite holding this senior post in the DA, Taljaard had opposed the formation of the coalition, which was generally viewed as a step to the right of the DP. In 2002, Taljaard was disciplined and forced to apologise to her party after she deviated from the DA's position on floor-crossing legislation: the law would allow DP members formally to join the DA, thus establishing the DA as an official parliamentary party, but Taljaard boycotted the vote on the law. During the 2003 floor-crossing window, when the DP expected its representatives to cross to the DA, Taljaard was viewed as a possible hold-out.

=== Arms Deal: 2001–2002 ===
Taljaard gained much of her national public profile as a leading critic of the 1999 Arms Deal, a massive defence procurement package that was marred by allegations of corruption by politicians of the governing party, the African National Congress (ANC). Her engagement with the Arms Deal began in the Portfolio Committee on Public Enterprises, which investigated the industrial offsets that were attached to the deal. In January 2001, the DA appointed her to a seat in the Standing Committee on Public Accounts (SCOPA), where she became the party's main spokesperson on the Arms Deal and related investigations. Soon after joining the committee, in February 2001, Taljaard led the DA in a walkout from a committee meeting in protest of what she called "the strong-arm tactics of the executive" in relation to Arms Deal investigations.

In December 2001, the ANC majority in the committee pushed through a report on an Arms Deal inquiry over the objections of opposition parties; Taljaard said it was a sign that the ANC intended to shut down the investigation and disable SCOPA's oversight functions. She also said she was considering leaving SCOPA to return to the Portfolio Committee on Public Enterprises. Two months later, in February 2002, SCOPA chairperson Gavid Woods resigned, citing political interference in the committee's work as well as an increasingly polarised working environment, with ANC members treating him and Taljaard with particular hostility. The Sunday Times agreed that Taljaard and Woods had been subject to "relentless hammering" in the committee, and Taljaard later described it as having been "like pseudo-psychological warfare". The press expected Taljaard to follow Woods in resigning. In early March, Woods was replaced by the ANC's Vincent Smith – the first SCOPA chairperson ever to come from the governing party, in a break with tradition – and Taljaard resigned soon afterwards.

In later years, Taljaard remained a critic of the Arms Deal and of the ANC's response to related investigations: she argued that the ANC, assisted by Speaker Frene Ginwala, had systematically and deliberately undermined SCOPA's oversight role, permanently weakening parliamentary institutions. In 2007, the National Prosecuting Authority said that it intended to call her as a witness in the criminal trial of former Deputy President Jacob Zuma, who faced corruption charges related to the deal (though the trial did not ultimately proceed), and she was later one of several critics summoned to testify before the Seriti Commission of Inquiry. She published a memoir of her time in SCOPA, entitled Up in Arms: Pursuing Accountability for the Arms Deal in Parliament, in 2012.

=== Finance: 2002–2004 ===
After resigning from SCOPA, Taljaard replaced Ken Andrew in the Portfolio Committee on Finance, where she became the DA's shadow minister and spokesperson on finance. After the 2003 State of the Nation Address by President Thabo Mbeki, Taljaard was forced to retract her remark – made in allusion to widespread corruption allegations against ANC politicians – that Mbeki's entourage resembled "an identification parade at a criminal investigation".

She remained in her post as shadow finance minister and spokesperson until her resignation from Parliament. While she was in this role, at the end of 2003, the Mail & Guardian named her as one of twenty people in politics who "will emerge as key figures in our public life over the next 10 years".

=== Re-election: April 2004 ===
Also in 2003, Taljaard was appointed as a Yale World Fellow, in which capacity she spent several months abroad at Yale University, where she conducted research on the proliferation of private military companies. This hiatus apparently attracted the ire of party activists linked to Taljaard's party constituency in the suburb of Florida, west of Johannesburg. She later said that she returned home early from Yale at Leon's urging.

In January 2004, as the 2004 general election approached, a provisional draft of the DA's party list was leaked which showed Taljaard ranked in an unelectable position: 32nd in the Gauteng caucus. Taljaard had been nominated to return as a DA candidate by parliamentary veteran Helen Suzman, reportedly a close friend and mentor, who told the press that Taljaard was one of the DA's "most valuable members" and that her demotion was "crazy". Taljaard later said that she was "aghast" and humiliated by her ranking.

As widely expected, Leon used his prerogative as party leader to increase Taljaard's ranking on the list. She was ultimately ranked seventh on the DA's Gauteng list and comfortably secured re-election in April 2004.

=== Resignation: November 2004 ===
However, on 5 November 2004, Taljaard released a brief statement announcing her resignation from Parliament "for private reasons". She left with effect from 1 January 2005 and was replaced by Anchen Dreyer. She also resigned from the DA. The Mail & Guardian said that after her departure, the DA "battled... to make a meaningful contribution to economic debate in the National Assembly; writing in the same newspaper, Richard Calland said that her resignation reflected poorly on the trajectory of the party, which he condemned as "apparently so caught up in their own hubris that they were unable to accommodate someone of Taljaard’s abilities". Rhoda Kadalie, however, later described Taljaard as the victim of her own "political entitlement... and limitless hubris".

The reasons for Taljaard's resignation were subject to speculation. DA chief whip Douglas Gibson said that Taljaard had left to pursue an academic career, that she had considered leaving on several prior occasions, and that she did not have "a commitment to a long-term political career like most of the rest of us do". The party strongly denied widespread rumours that Taljaard's resignation was in fact the result of infighting in the DA, including disagreements between her and Gibson. In 2011, Taljaard said that her resignation had been "an important moment of personal authenticity after a clear dissonance between my inner being and the harsh and in my view dysfunctional and war-like hostile tone of our public discourse during this time". She expanded on this theme in her 2012 memoir, writing of the DA's mode of opposition to the ANC:

I was deeply averse to engaging in war-like posturing with ANC colleagues whose intentions and motivations were similar to mine — although we held widely divergent views on how best to achieve our common goals. They were my compatriots, not my arch-rivals... It was as if I did not belong anywhere else, but right in the middle of the floor of the House — between the DA and the ANC — where my own beliefs and feelings intermingled: the ideological, pragmatic middle ground, which neither party would ever concede as existing in our complex society.

The book also partly linked her disenchantment with party politics to the failed Arms Deal investigations. However, it confirmed earlier rumours that she had fallen out with party leaders, most importantly with Leon. Taljaard described her uneasiness about having returned to Parliament in 2004 through Leon's preferment, which she thought might carry the presumption of "unquestioning loyalty" to him, and she said that her personal relationship with Leon had grown tense after she shared with him her concerns that he was leading the party while "isolated and cloistered in a bubble with his male entourage, who acted as echo chambers for each other's belief systems". In the book, Taljaard quotes her resignation letter as having read, "Allow me to clarify again: my reasons for departing relate primarily to the DA, key personalities within it and their respective roles, and not to the ANC".

== Helen Suzman Foundation: 2006–2009 ==
After leaving Parliament, Taljaard became a lecturer at Witwatersrand University's Graduate School of Public and Development Management. In early 2006, she was named as one of the World Economic Forum's Young Global Leaders.

In April 2006, she was appointed as director of the Helen Suzman Foundation, an independent liberal-democratic think-tank named in honour of Taljaard's former political mentor; she became the third person to hold the directorship, after longstanding director Lawrence Schlemmer and, before him, R. W. Johnson. She also took over from Patrick Laurence as editor of the foundation's journal, Focus.

During her term, she was an outspoken critic of the ANC's move to disband the Scorpions, which she said was "made with a view to shielding key ANC members from effective investigation and prosecution". However, she received scathing criticism from DA strategist Gareth van Onselen, who accused her of "going out of the way to accommodate the most virulent critics of liberalism and liberal discourse" (such as, according to him, Kader Asmal) in the foundation's panel discussions and publications. He continued to criticise her along similar lines and for her "deferential attitude to the ANC". Taljaard said that van Onselen's criticism resulted from a personal vendetta related to the circumstances of her resignation from the DA and said that she did not share the DA's "myopia" in defining liberalism in a narrowly economic way.

While leading the Helen Suzman Foundation, Taljaard continued to lecture part-time at Wits, and in August 2007 she was additionally appointed to the board of the Public Investment Corporation. At the conclusion of her three-year term as director, the foundation announced that her contract would not be renewed and that she would be replaced by Francis Antonie.

== Electoral Commission: 2011–2015 ==
In October 2011, a parliamentary committee chaired by Chief Justice Mogoeng Mogoeng recommended that Taljaard should be appointed to fill one of three vacancies arising at the Electoral Commission of South Africa (IEC). Jacob Zuma, in his capacity as President of South Africa, appointed her to the commission in November. She served as a part-time commissioner and continued to work as a lecturer in public policy at the University of Cape Town, while also serving on the World Economic Forum's Regional Agenda Council for Africa and on the board of loveLife.

Taljaard's term at the IEC coincided with a report by the Public Protector which alleged that the IEC had signed procurement contracts with a private company despite a conflict of interest on the part of IEC chairperson Pansy Tlakula. The Mail & Guardian said that Taljaard was among the commissioners who took a hard line, arguing that the Public Protector's recommendations should be implemented without regard for pressure from political parties – on both sides of the aisle – who argued that an over-zealous response might undermine organisational stability at the IEC ahead of the 2014 general election.

Taljaard did not complete her term at the Electoral Commission but announced in February 2015 that she would resign to work on her PhD full-time. She completed her PhD in political science at Stellenbosch University and went on to work as an independent consultant.

== Personal life ==
Taljaard's partner is Lucio Gottardo, an Italian businessman in the luxury leather goods sector. She was formerly in a relationship with Inkatha Freedom Party politician Mario Ambrosini.
