= Lerumo Kalako =

South African politician (born 1955)

Member of the National Assembly
- In office 21 May 2014 – 7 May 2019
- Constituency: Western Cape
- In office June 1999 – June 2009

Personal details
- Born: Mziwamadoda Uppington Kalako; 12 December 1955 (age 70)
- Citizenship: South Africa
- Party: African National Congress

Mziwamadoda Uppington "Lerumo" Kalako (born 12 December 1955) is a South African politician who represented the African National Congress (ANC) in the National Assembly from 1999 to 2009 and from 2014 to 2019. He was elected in the 1999 general election and re-elected in 2004. After a hiatus from the legislature, he returned in the 2014 general election, ranked second on the ANC's provincial party list for the Western Cape. He also served as the ANC's whip in the Portfolio Committee on Communications and Digital Technologies from 2014 to 2015.

During apartheid, Kalako was imprisoned on Robben Island for eight years between 1978 and 1986. During the first democratic Parliament, he was a member of the Western Cape Provincial Parliament and served as the Western Cape's Member of the Executive Council (MEC) for Environmental Affairs, Nature Conservation and Tourism.

Following the disbandment of the ANC Provincial Executive Committee (PEC) in the Western Cape in August 2019, Kalako was appointed convenor of the Interim Provincial Committee tasked with preparing the provincial structure for a provincial elective conference. After nearly four years in the position, the ANC in the Western Cape held its provincial conference in June 2023 where Kalako was expected to stand for the position of provincial chairperson, however, he declined the nomination. His ally, Vuyiso JJ Tyhalisisu, was nominated from the conference floor and won the election for provincial chairman.
