= Randy Pieterse =

South African politician and unionist (born 1956)

Member of the National Assembly
- In office June 1999 – May 2009
- Constituency: Western Cape

Personal details
- Born: Randy Desmond Pieterse; 17 April 1956 (age 70)
- Citizenship: South Africa
- Party: African National Congress

Randy Desmond Pieterse (born 17 April 1956) is a South African politician and former trade unionist who represented the African National Congress (ANC) in the National Assembly from 1999 to 2009, serving the Western Cape constituency. He is a former provincial leader of the Congress of South African Trade Unions (Cosatu) in the Western Cape. In 2006, he was convicted of stealing from Parliament in the Travelgate scandal.

== Early life and career ==
Born on 17 April 1956, Pieterse was formerly the head of the Western Cape branch of Cosatu.

== Legislative career: 1999–2009 ==
He joined the National Assembly in the 1999 general election and served two terms in his seat, gaining re-election in 2004. He served the Western Cape constituency. Though he stood for re-election in the 2009 general election, he was ranked tenth on the ANC's party list for the Western Cape and narrowly failed to win a seat.

== Travelgate ==
In August 2004, the Scorpions named Pieterse as among the numerous MPs who were under investigation for possible abuse of parliamentary air-travel vouchers, in what became known as Travelgate. Pieterse had allegedly allowed friends to use his vouchers at Parliament's expense. In October 2006, he signed a plea deal with the Scorpions, in terms of which he pled guilty to theft in the Cape High Court. The theft concerned an amount of R60,000 in service benefits and he was sentenced to pay a fine of R25,000 or serve three years' imprisonment; he was also sentenced to a mandatory five years' imprisonment, suspended conditionally.

According to IOL, Pieterse was viewed as an example of a junior ANC MP who had been "'sacrificed' at the expense of the 'bigger fish'" who had not been prosecuted for their involvement. Speaking to his colleagues in the Portfolio Committee on Communications after his conviction, Pieterse said that he did not hold any grudges, saying, "I am not angry at anybody. I am angry at myself. I should have been more careful. I had to pay R25 000 for my lesson. I hope others can get the lesson free just by observing what I have done." However, he said that he would challenge any decision by the party or Parliament to remove him from his seat, since "My intention was never to defraud Parliament". He was not removed from his seat, but he and other convicted MPs received a formal reprimand from the Speaker of the National Assembly, Baleka Mbete, in March 2007.
