= Siphokuhle Patrein =

South African politician

Siphokuhle Patrein MP

Member of the National Assembly of South Africa
- In office 22 May 2019 – 13 March 2024
- Constituency: Western Cape

Personal details
- Born: Siphokuhle Patrein; 9 October 1990 (age 35)
- Party: African National Congress (Until 2024; expelled)

Siphokuhle Patrein (born 9 October 1990) is a South African politician and a former member of the National Assembly of South Africa from the Western Cape. Patrein was a member of the African National Congress.

== Political career ==
Patrein was elected as the deputy provincial secretary of the African National Congress Youth League in 2018.

In 2019 Patrein stood for election to the South African National Assembly as 7th on the ANC's Western Cape regional list. At the election, she won a seat in parliament. After the election, Patrein was elected to serve on the Portfolio Committee on Police.

Patrein was expelled from the ANC and consequently ceased being a member of parliament on 13 March 2024.
