= Eyewitness News (South Africa) =

South African news publisher

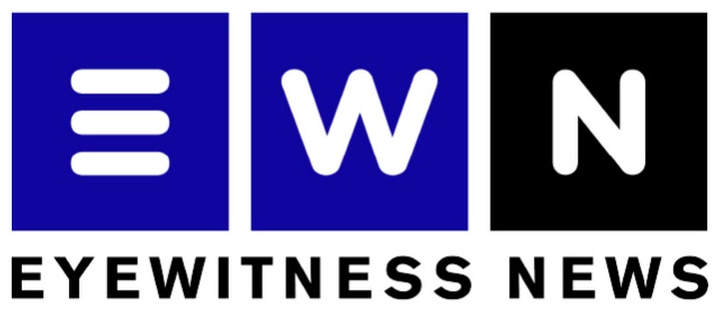
- Abbreviation: EWN
- Location: South Africa
- Region served: Africa
- Official language: English
- Website: www.ewn.co.za

Eyewitness News (also known as EWN) is a South African television and internet news publisher, focusing on local and international breaking news stories, entertainment, sports, business, politics and interactive media.

== Notable coverage ==
On 3 March 2014, EWN along with sister radio brands, 702 and CapeTalk launched a digital pop-up radio station covering the Oscar Pistorius Trial. The pop-up radio station concluded on the final day of sentencing on 21 October 2014.
