= Danny Olifant =

South African politician and trade unionist (1956–2012)

Member of the National Assembly
- In office May 1994 – May 2009
- Constituency: Western Cape

Personal details
- Born: Daniel April Andrew Olifant; 31 July 1956
- Died: 30 October 2012 (aged 56) Atlantis, Western Cape; Republic of South Africa
- Citizenship: South Africa
- Party: African National Congress

Daniel April Andrew Olifant (31 July 1956 – 30 October 2012), sometimes misspelled Daniel Oliphant, was a South African politician and former trade unionist. A former deputy president of the National Union of Metalworkers of South Africa (Numsa), he represented the African National Congress (ANC) in the National Assembly from 1994 to 2009. He was convicted of abusing Parliament's travel-voucher system in the Travelgate scandal.

== Early life and career ==
Born on 31 July 1956, Olifant rose to political prominence as chairperson of Numsa's branch in Atlantis, a town on the outskirts of Cape Town that was designated for Coloured residents under apartheid. He later served as regional secretary of Numsa's Western Cape branch and then as national deputy president of the union. He also served a term as provincial chairperson of the Congress of South African Trade Unions (Cosatu).

== Parliament: 1994–2009 ==
In South Africa's first democratic elections in 1994, Olifant was elected to represent the ANC in the National Assembly. He had stood as one of 20 candidates nominated by Cosatu to stand on the ANC's party list within the framework of the Tripartite Alliance. He served three terms in his seat, gaining re-election in 1999 and 2004, and served the Western Cape constituency.

Melanie Verwoerd, who shared a bench in the chamber with him during the first democratic Parliament, later described him as "a larger than life figure" who "called a spade a bloody shovel when required". Writing for City Press, Verwoerd recalled that Olifant had one day caused a stir by shouting at Marike de Klerk, the wife and guest of deputy president F. W. de Klerk, during a gap in proceedings: having noticed that de Klerk, in a presumptive display of disrespect, habitually failed to stand when President Nelson Mandela entered the chamber, he apparently shouted at her, "Marike, staan op, jy is ONGESKIK!" (Afrikaans for "Marike, stand up, you are RUDE!"). According to Verwoerd, de Klerk henceforth stood up when Mandela entered.

== Travelgate ==
While a sitting MP, Olifant retained several business interests, and he helped found a travel agency, Eyabantu, which did business with Parliament for the one month that it was operational. In November 2003, Olifant was cleared by Parliament's ethics committee on a charge of failing to disclose a financial interest; the committee accepted Olifant's explanation that he had merely stood surety for the agency and had not had a substantial interest.

In August 2004, during the Travelgate scandal, the Scorpions announced that Olifant under investigation for possible abuse of Parliament's travel-voucher system in his capacity as an MP. In November 2006, facing a criminal fraud charge, he said that he had decided not to accept a plea bargain and to plead his innocence. However, he concluded a plea bargain the following month; he was sentenced to pay a R30,000 fine or serve three years' imprisonment. In the aftermath, the ANC demoted him, removing him from his position as a committee whip.

== Personal life and death ==
Olifant was divorced from Magdalene Olifant and had four daughters and three sons. He died on the night of 30 October 2012 in a car accident on the West Coast Road near Atlantis.
