= Bruce Kannemeyer =

South African politician and public servant (1965–2025)

Member of the National Assembly
- In office June 1999 – 1 November 2004
- Constituency: Western Cape

Personal details
- Born: 1965
- Died: 18 January 2025 (aged 59–60)
- Citizenship: South Africa
- Party: African National Congress

Bruce William Kannemeyer (1965 – 18 January 2025) was a South African politician and public servant who represented the African National Congress (ANC) in the National Assembly from 1999 to 2004, serving the Western Cape. Since leaving the assembly in November 2004, he worked in local public administration. In 2006, he was convicted of stealing from Parliament in the Travelgate scandal.

== Parliament: 1999–2004 ==
Kannemeyer was first elected to the National Assembly in the 1999 general election, representing the ANC in the Western Cape constituency. He served on the Standing Committee on Public Accounts and the Mail & Guardian alleged that he was key in the ANC caucus's efforts to divert the committee's inquiry into the Arms Deal.

He was re-elected to his legislative seat in April 2004. However, by that time, he was simultaneously working part-time in local government in the Western Cape – he chaired the audit committees in both Boland and Drakenstein – and on 1 November 2004 he resigned from Parliament to join local government full-time. Bongani Mkongi filled his seat in the National Assembly.

== Local government: 2004–2025 ==
Kannemeyer became municipal manager at Stellenbosch Local Municipality, which at the time was governed in a coalition between the ANC and New National Party. While he was still in that position, in January 2006, the Scorpions announced that they intended to prosecute Kannemeyer on criminal charges arising from his tenure in Parliament: he was accused of having defrauded Parliament in the Travelgate saga. His first court appearance was on 16 February in the Cape High Court.

In October 2016, Kannemeyer accepted a plea deal with prosecutors and pled guilty to one count of theft pertaining to R70,000 in unlawfully claimed service benefits. He was sentenced to pay a fine of R40,000 or serve three years' imprisonment, in addition to a mandatory prison sentence of five years suspended conditionally. He elected to pay the fine. In the aftermath of his conviction, he acknowledged that he "should have been more alert" to avoid participating in the fraud, and said:

There will be some who will be unforgiving. But I hope people will judge me on the balance of my total contribution – and not just reduce me to the thief the court has made me. I hope there is space to have a second chance.

He remained in Stellenbosch until after the 2006 local elections, when the opposition Democratic Alliance took control of the municipality in a new coalition. In July 2006, the municipality announced that it intended to terminate Kannemeyer's contract "unilaterally, based on political grounds" but would pay him the R1.8 million due to him in salary for the remainder of his term. He subsequently became municipal manager at OR Tambo District Municipality in the Eastern Cape and then at Phumelela Local Municipality and Ngwathe Local Municipality in the Free State.

== Death ==
Kannemeyer died from cancer on 18 January 2025.
