= Bulelwa Tinto =

Bulelwa Tinto is a South African politician. A member of the African National Congress, Tinto is from Cape Town, Western Cape Province. She is a member of the National Assembly of South Africa and does not sit on any parliamentary committees.
