= Caroline Makasi =

South African politician

Member of the National Assembly
- In office June 1999 – 6 May 2014
- Constituency: Western Cape

Personal details
- Citizenship: South Africa
- Party: African National Congress

Xoliswa Caroline Makasi is a South African politician who represented the African National Congress (ANC) in the National Assembly from 1999 to 2014, serving the Western Cape constituency. She was elected to her seat in 1999, 2004, and 2009.

During her third and final term in the assembly, she served as the ANC's whip in the Portfolio Committee on Tourism. She was also active in the ANC Women's League. In addition, in 2012, she was nominated to stand for election to the ANC's National Executive Committee, but she declined the nomination when the party's elective conference opened. In the 2014 general election, she was ranked 13th on the ANC's regional party list for the Western Cape but later withdrew.
