= Jonathan Arendse =

South African politician

Member of the National Assembly
- In office May 1994 – June 2009
- Constituency: Western Cape

Personal details
- Citizenship: South Africa
- Party: African National Congress

Jonathan Doneley Arendse is a South African politician who represented the African National Congress (ANC) in the National Assembly from 1994 to 2009. He was elected to his seat in the 1994 general election, South Africa's first post-apartheid election, and he gained re-election in 1999 and 2004; he represented the Western Cape constituency. He was Acting Chairperson of the Portfolio Committee on Environmental Affairs in 2003.
