= 2003 South African floor-crossing window period =

The 2003 floor crossing window period in South Africa was a period of 15 days, from 21 March to 4 April 2003, in which members of the National Assembly and the provincial legislatures were able to cross the floor from one political party to another without giving up their seats. The period was authorised by the passage of the Tenth Amendment of the Constitution of South Africa. The amendment scheduled regular window periods in the second and fourth September after each election, but the second and fourth Septembers after the 1999 election had already passed, so it included provision for a special window period starting fifteen days after the amendment came into effect.

In the National Assembly, the floor-crossing expanded the African National Congress' (ANC) representation from 266 seats, one short of the two-thirds majority needed to amend the constitution, to 275 seats. In the KwaZulu-Natal Provincial Legislature, the Inkatha Freedom Party (IFP) and the ANC were before the window period the largest and second-largest parties respectively. As a result of the floor-crossing, they changed places; however, the ANC did not attain an absolute majority, holding 35 seats of 80. In the Western Cape Provincial Parliament the ANC expanded its representation to an absolute majority, growing from 18 to 22 seats of a total 42.

During this window period representatives of the Democratic Party (DP) officially became representatives of the Democratic Alliance (DA). Amongst a group of new parties created by floor-crossing, the most significant was the Independent Democrats, who gained one member in the National Assembly and one in the Gauteng Provincial Legislature.

The tables below show all the changes; in those provinces not listed there was no change in the provincial legislature, other than the DP becoming the DA.

== Tables ==
=== National Assembly ===
Party	Seats before	Net change	Seats after
ANC	266	+9	275
DA (Note: Democratic Party representatives officially became Democratic Alliance representatives during this floor-crossing period.)	38	+8	46
IFP	34	−3	31
NNP	28	−8	20
ACDP	6	+1	7
UDM	14	−10	4
VF+	3	0	3
UCDP	3	0	3
PAC	3	−1	2
Federal Alliance	2	0	2
AZAPO	1	0	1
MF	1	0	1
African Independent Movement (Note: Party created during this floor-crossing period.)		+1	1
Alliance for Democracy and Prosperity		+1	1
ID		+1	1
National Action		+1	1
Peace and Justice Congress		+1	1
Afrikaner Eenheidsbeweging	1	−1	0
Total	400		

=== Eastern Cape Provincial Legislature ===
Party	Seats before	Net change	Seats after
ANC	47	+2	49
UDM	9	−2	7
DA	4	+1	5
NNP	2	−1	1
PAC	1	0	1
Total	63		

=== Gauteng Provincial Legislature ===
Party	Seats before	Net change	Seats after
ANC	50	0	50
DA	13	−1	12
NNP	3	0	3
IFP	3	0	3
ACDP	1	0	1
Federal Alliance	1	0	1
UDM	1	0	1
Conservative		+1	1
ID		+1	1
VF+	1	−1	0
Total	73		

=== KwaZulu-Natal Provincial Legislature ===
Party	Seats before	Net change	Seats after
ANC	32	+3	35
IFP	34	−2	32
DA	7	−1	6
NNP	3	−1	2
MF	2	0	2
ACDP	1	0	1
UDM	1	0	1
Peace and Development Party		+1	1
Total	80		

=== Western Cape Provincial Parliament ===
Party	Seats before	Net change	Seats after
ANC	18	+4	22
NNP	17	−7	10
DA	5	+2	7
ACDP	1	+1	2
New Labour Party		+1	1
UDM	1	−1	0
Total	42		

=== National Council of Provinces ===
The National Council of Provinces was reconstituted as a result of the changes in the provincial legislatures. Its reconstituted makeup was as follows:

Party	Delegate type	EC	FS	G	KZN	M	NW	NC	NP	WC	Total	
ANC	Permanent	4	4	4	3	5	4	4	5	3	36	66
ANC	Special	4	4	3	2	4	4	3	4	2	30	66
DA	Permanent	1	1	1	1	1	1			1	7	9
DA	Special			1						1	2	9
NNP	Permanent		1	1				2		1	5	7
NNP	Special							1		1	2	7
IFP	Permanent				2						2	4
IFP	Special				2						2	4
UDM	Permanent	1							1		2	
ACDP	Permanent									1	1	
UCDP	Permanent						1				1	
Total		10	10	10	10	10	10	10	10	10	90	

== See also ==
- Floor crossing (South Africa)
- 2005 South African floor-crossing window period
- 2007 South African floor-crossing window period
