= List of members of the 5th KwaZulu-Natal Legislature =

Elected legislature of the KwaZulu-Natal province

5th KwaZulu-Natal Legislature
←	4th Legislature	6th Legislature	→
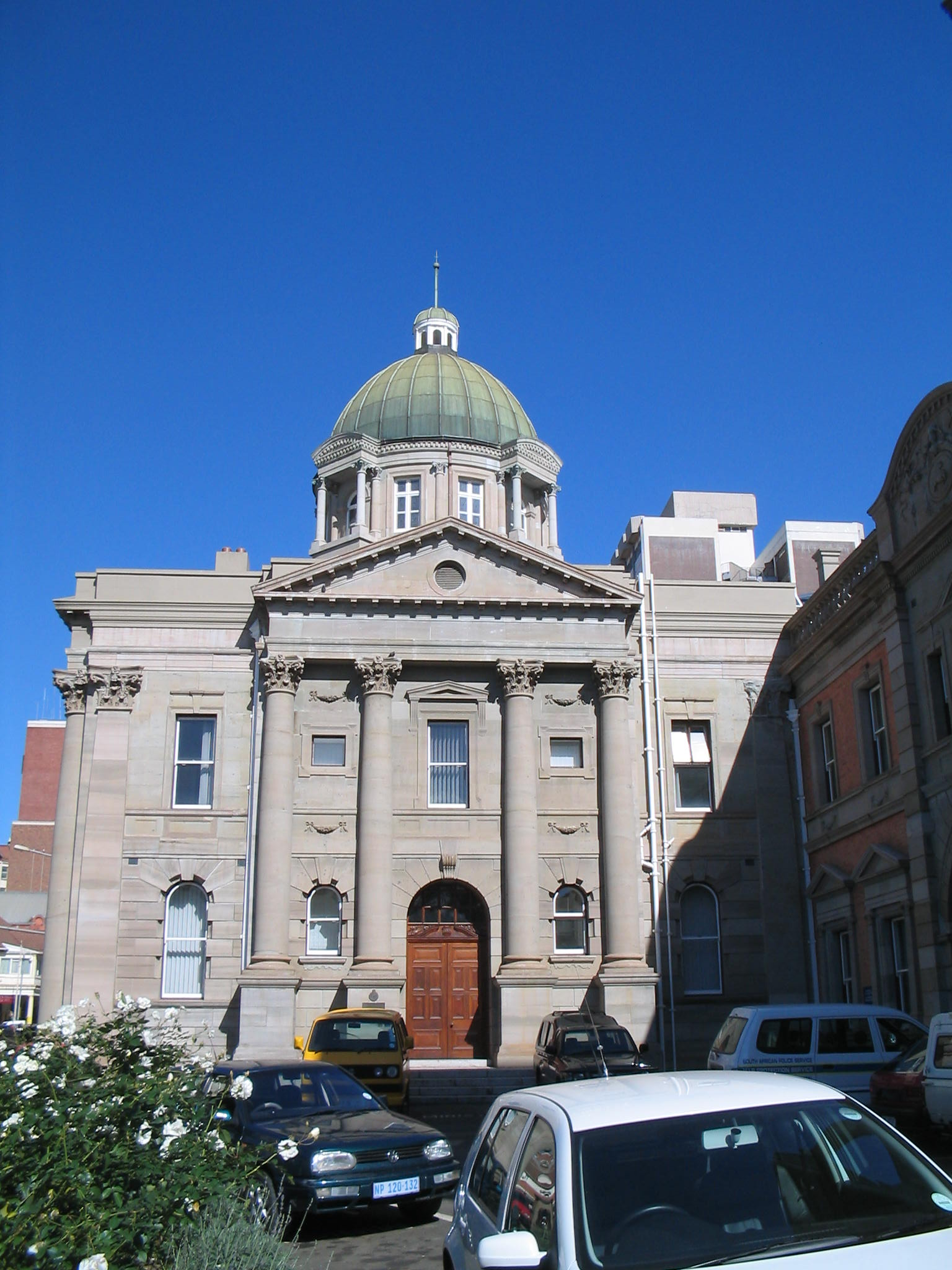
- KwaZulu-Natal Parliament Building

Overview
- Legislative body: KwaZulu-Natal Legislature
- Jurisdiction: KwaZulu-Natal, South Africa
- Meeting place: KwaZulu-Natal Parliament Building; 239 Langalibalele Street, Pietermaritzburg
- Term: 21 May 2014 – 7 May 2019
- Election: 7 May 2014
- Members: 80
- Speaker: Lydia Johnson (ANC)
- Deputy Speaker: Meshack Radebe (ANC)
- Premier: Senzo Mchunu (ANC) (2014–2016); Willies Mchunu (ANC) (2016–2019)
- Leader of the Opposition: Sizwe Mchunu (DA)

Between May 2014 and May 2019, the KwaZulu-Natal Legislature, the official legislature of the KwaZulu-Natal province of South Africa, consisted of 80 members from six different political parties, elected on 7 May 2014 in the 2014 South African general election. The African National Congress (ANC) retained its majority in the legislature with a total of 52 seats, an increase of one seat from the previous legislature elected in 2009.

By contrast, the Inkatha Freedom Party (IFP) lost nine seats and was replaced by the Democratic Alliance (DA) as the official opposition in the legislature. With nine seats, compared to the DA's ten, the IFP was the third-largest party in the legislature. The fourth- and fifth-largest were both newly established parties: the National Freedom Party (NFP) occupied six seats and the Economic Freedom Fighters (EFF) occupied two. A seat apiece had been lost by the Minority Front (MF), the African Christian Democratic Party (ACDP), and the Congress of the People (Cope), leaving the MF with only one seat and the ACDP and Cope without any representation at all.

Members of the 5th Provincial Legislature took office on 21 May 2014 and served until the general election of 8 May 2019. During the first sitting of the legislature, the ANC's Senzo Mchunu was elected to his first full term as Premier of KwaZulu-Natal. Also from the ANC, Lydia Johnson was retained as Speaker and Meshack Radebe became Deputy Speaker. Sizwe Mchunu of the DA took office as Leader of the Opposition. On 25 May 2016, Willies Mchunu took over as Premier.

== Composition ==
This comparison of party strengths from the 5th KwaZulu-Natal Legislature is represented graphically.

- Note this is not the official seating plan of the KwaZulu-Natal Legislature.

Party	Seats
African National Congress	52
DA	10
Inkatha Freedom Party	9
National Freedom Party	6
Economic Freedom Fighters	2
MF	1
Total	80

== Members ==
This table depicts the list of members of the 5th KwaZulu-Natal Legislature as elected in the election of 7 May 2014. Members of the Provincial Legislature (MPLs) are elected through a system of party-list proportional representation with closed lists.

Name	Parliamentary group
Nomusa Dube-Ncube	ANC
Senzo Mchunu	ANC
Ina Cronje	ANC
Willies Mchunu	ANC
Mike Mabuyakhulu	ANC
Peggy Nkonyeni	ANC
Sibongiseni Dhlomo	ANC
Mtholephi Mthimkhulu	ANC
Meshack Radebe	ANC
Ntombikayise Saphetha	ANC
Sipho Nkosi	ANC
Weziwe Thusi	ANC
Mxolisi Kaunda	ANC
Bheki Ntuli	ANC
Ravi Pillay	ANC
Lydia Johnson	ANC
Cyril Xaba	ANC
Senzo Mkhize	ANC
Mthandeni Dlungwana	ANC
Vusi Dube	ANC
Maggie Govender	ANC
Belinda Scott	ANC
Lindiwe Bebee	ANC
Nonhlanhla Khoza	ANC
Happy Mamlili Blose	ANC
Nhlakanipho Ntombela	ANC
Mbali Frazer	ANC
Sipho Gcabashe	ANC
Bongi Sithole	ANC
Siboniso Duma	ANC
Nomagugu Simelane-Zulu	ANC
Themba Mthembu	ANC
Hlobisile Dlamini	ANC
Jomo Sibiya	ANC
Zanele Ludidi	ANC
Linda Hlongwa-Madlala	ANC
Super Zuma	ANC
Important Samson Mkhize	ANC
Maria Ntuli	ANC
Alpha Shelembe	ANC
Ntobeko Boyce	ANC
Bhekimali Vasco Hlengwa	ANC
Vuyelwa Vivian Tambo	ANC
Zwelifile Ntuli	ANC
Nonzwakazi Swartbooi-Ntombela	ANC
Sakhephi Dlomo	ANC
Nomfundo Ntombenhle Penelope Mkhulusi	ANC
Yatima Nahara	ANC
Fortune Kwazi Kwakhe Bhengu	ANC
Lizzie Shabalala	ANC
Mthenjwa Zondi	ANC
Zibuse Mlaba	ANC
Sizwe Mchunu	DA
Mbali Ntuli	DA
Imran Keeka	DA
Francois Rodgers	DA
Rishigen Viranna	DA
Mark Steele	DA
Hlanganani Gumbi	DA
Ann McDonnell	DA
Rafeek Shah	DA
Ganesan Mari	DA
Elphas Buthelezi	IFP
Blessed Gwala	IFP
Thembeni Mthethwa	IFP
Subramoney Moodley	IFP
Hassan Farouk Motala	IFP
Lionel Mtshali	IFP
Ncamisile Nkwanyana	IFP
Joshua Mazibuko	IFP
Mntomuhle Khawula	IFP
Vikizitha Mlotshwa	NFP
Stanley Dladla	NFP
Happy Khuzwayo	NFP
Sipho Mdakane	NFP
Bongokwakhe Mthokozisi Nzuza	NFP
Erickson Zungu	NFP
Vusi Khoza	EFF
Thembi Msane	EFF
Shameen Thakur-Rajbansi	MF
