= List of members of the 4th KwaZulu-Natal Legislature =

Elected legislature of the KwaZulu-Natal province

4th KwaZulu-Natal Legislature
←	3rd Legislature	5th Legislature	→
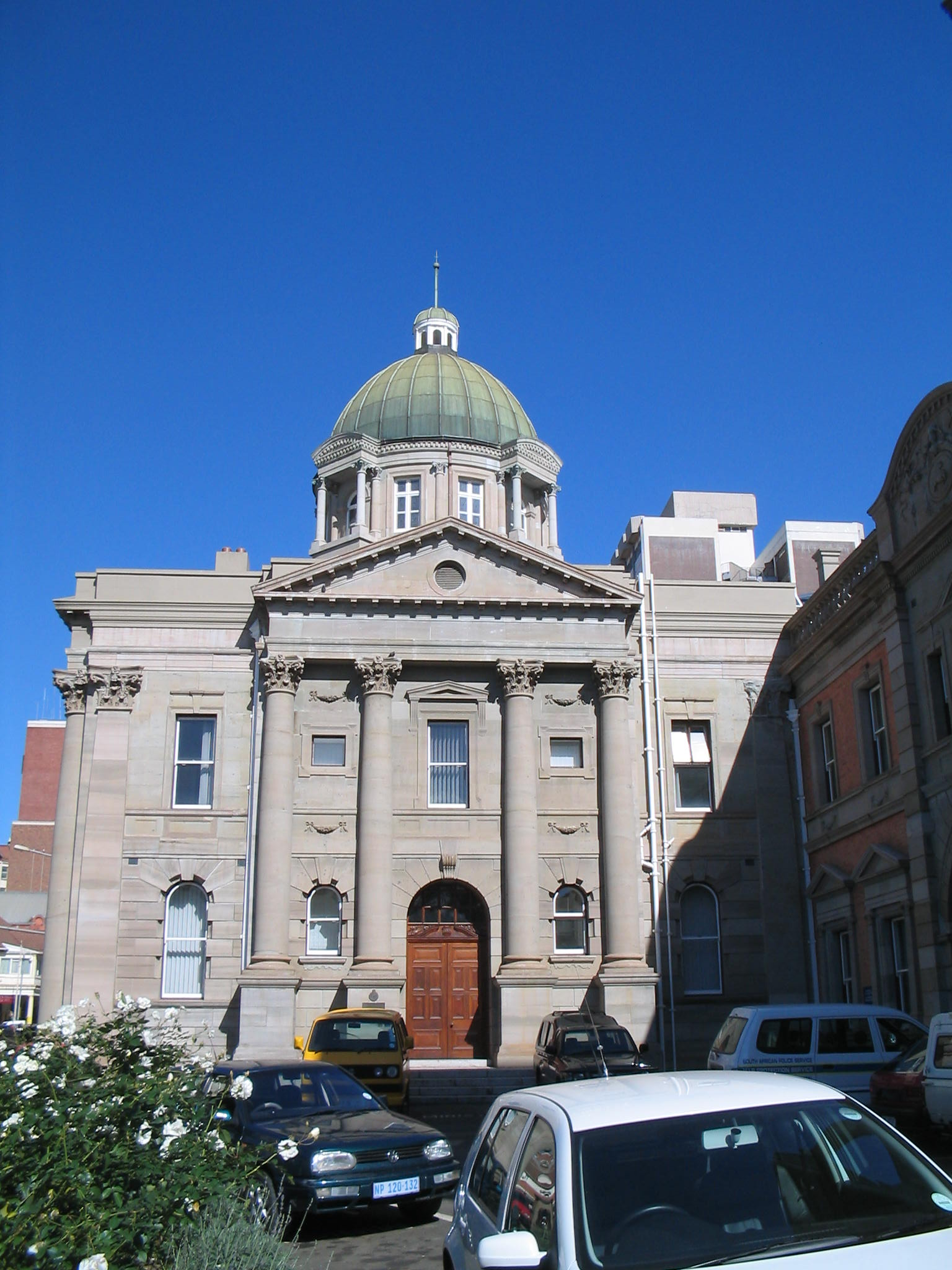
- KwaZulu-Natal Parliament Building

Overview
- Legislative body: KwaZulu-Natal Legislature
- Jurisdiction: KwaZulu-Natal, South Africa
- Meeting place: KwaZulu-Natal Parliament Building; 239 Langalibalele Street, Pietermaritzburg
- Term: 6 May 2009 – 6 May 2014
- Election: 22 April 2009
- Members: 80
- Speaker: Peggy Nkonyeni (ANC) (2009–2013); Lydia Johnson (ANC) (2013–2014)
- Premier: Zweli Mkhize (ANC) (2009–2013); Senzo Mchunu (ANC) (2013–2014)

Between May 2009 and May 2014, the KwaZulu-Natal Legislature, the official legislature of the KwaZulu-Natal province of South Africa, consisted of 80 members from six different political parties, elected on 22 April 2009 in the 2009 South African general election. For the first time ever, the African National Congress (ANC) won an outright majority of 51 seats in the legislature, an increase of 13 seats from the previous legislature elected in 2004.

The Inkatha Freedom Party (IFP) lost 12 seats but, with 18 seats, remained the second-largest party in the legislature. The Democratic Alliance (DA) and Minority Front (MF) retained their earlier seat allocations, with seven and two seats respectively. The African Christian Democratic Party (ACDP) held a single seat, a decrease of one seat from the previous legislature, while the new Congress of the People (COPE) also earned a single seat. The United Democratic Movement (UDM) lost its seat in the legislature and was not represented.

Members of the 4th Provincial Legislature took office on 6 May 2009 and served until the general election of 7 May 2014. The ANC's Zweli Mkhize was elected Premier at the legislature's first sitting, but he was replaced by Senzo Mchunu in August 2013. Likewise, Peggy Nkonyeni, also of the ANC, was elected Speaker of the legislature in 2009 but was replaced by Lydia Johnson in October 2013.

== Composition ==
This is a graphical comparison of party strengths as they were in the 5th KwaZulu-Natal Legislature.

- Note this is not the official seating plan of the KwaZulu-Natal Legislature.

Party	Seats
African National Congress	51
Inkatha Freedom Party	18
DA	7
MF	2
African Christian Democratic Party	1
Congress of the People	1
Total	80

== Members ==
This table depicts the list of members of the 4th KwaZulu-Natal Legislature as elected in the election of 22 April 2009. Members of the Provincial Legislature (MPLs) are elected through a system of party-list proportional representation with closed lists.

Name	Parliamentary group
Zweli Mkhize	ANC
Ina Cronje	ANC
Senzo Mchunu	ANC
Peggy Nkonyeni	ANC
Willies Mchunu	ANC
Lydia Johnson	ANC
Bheki Cele	ANC
Weziwe Thusi	ANC
Mike Mabuyakhulu	ANC
Belinda Scott	ANC
Meshack Radebe	ANC
Nomusa Dube	ANC
John Mchunu	ANC
Makhosi Khoza	ANC
Cyril Xaba	ANC
Yatima Nahara	ANC
Mxolisi Kaunda	ANC
Zanele Ludidi	ANC
Mtholephi Mthimkhulu	ANC
Maggie Govender	ANC
Nhlakanipho Ntombela	ANC
Happy Blose	ANC
Sipho Gcabashe	ANC
Lindiwe Bebee	ANC
Bheki Ntuli	ANC
Nonzwakazi Swartbooi	ANC
Sipho Nkosi	ANC
Vuyelwa Vivian Tambo	ANC
Sam Mtetwa	ANC
Winile Zondi	ANC
Mike Tarr	ANC
Linda Hlongwa	ANC
Themba Mthembu	ANC
Marlene Virginia Noel	ANC
Sihlangu Joffrey Vilane	ANC
Nomakiki Majola	ANC
Dumisani Nicholas Khuzwayo	ANC
Rampathie Naidoo	ANC
Omie Singh	ANC
Mbali Frazer	ANC
Jan Slabbert	ANC
Lungelwa Lynette Zwane	ANC
Sibongiseni Dhlomo	ANC
Lizzie Shabalala	ANC
Siboniso Duma	ANC
Doris Sikosana	ANC
Ravi Pillay	ANC
Maria Ntuli	ANC
Ramarak Maharaj	ANC
Priscilla Mary McKay	ANC
Wilson Ngcobo	ANC
Zanele Msibi	IFP
Lionel Mtshali	IFP
Mntomuhle Khawula	IFP
Nyanga Ngubane	IFP
Blessed Gwala	IFP
Bonginkosi Buthelezi	IFP
Bonga Mdletshe	IFP
Henry Combrinck	IFP
Alexander James Hamilton	IFP
Lindani Mncwango	IFP
Stanley Dladla	IFP
Thulasizwe Buthelezi	IFP
Roman Liptak	IFP
Mfuniselwa Bhengu	IFP
M. Z. N. Madlala	IFP
Lourens de Klerk	IFP
Soobramoney Naicker	IFP
Joel Mthethwa	IFP
John Steenhuisen	DA
Sizwe Mchunu	DA
Ganesan Mari	DA
Makhosazana Mdlalose	DA
Tom Stokes	DA
Radley Keys	DA
Johann Krog	DA
Amichand Rajbansi	MF
Shameen Thakur-Rajbansi	MF
Jo-Ann Downs	ACDP
Lucky Gabela	COPE
