= Executive Council of KwaZulu-Natal =

Provincial government in South Africa

The Executive Council of KwaZulu-Natal is the cabinet of the executive branch of the provincial government in the South African province of KwaZulu-Natal. The Members of the Executive Council (MECs) are appointed from among the members of the KwaZulu-Natal Provincial Legislature by the Premier of KwaZulu-Natal, an office held since May 2024 by Thami Ntuli of the Inkatha Freedom Party (IFP).

== Mkhize premiership: 2009–2013 ==
After his election in the 2009 general election, Premier Zweli Mkhize announced his new Executive Council on 11 May 2009. Weeks afterwards, Bheki Cele resigned as MEC for Transport, Community Safety and Liaison, in order to become National Police Commissioner. On 29 July, Mkhize announced that Cele would be replaced by Willies Mchunu, and that Nomusa Dube-Ncube would in turn take over Mchunu's portfolio, Local Government and Traditional Affairs. In November 2011, Mkhize announced a reshuffle of his cabinet which affected four portfolios.

KwaZulu-Natal Executive Council 2009–2013
Post	Member	Term		Party
Premier of KwaZulu-Natal	Zweli Mkhize	2009	2013	ANC
MEC for Finance	Ina Cronje	2009	2013	ANC
MEC for Health	Sibongiseni Dhlomo	2009	2013	ANC
MEC for Education	Senzo Mchunu	2009	2013	ANC
MEC for Economic Development and Tourism	Mike Mabuyakhulu	2009	2013	ANC
MEC for Agriculture, Environmental Affairs and Rural Development	Meshack Radebe	2011	2013	ANC
MEC for Agriculture, Environmental Affairs and Rural Development	Lydia Johnson	2009	2011	ANC
MEC for Human Settlement and Public Works	Ravi Pillay	2011	2013	ANC
MEC for Human Settlement and Public Works	Maggie Govender	2009	2011	ANC
MEC for Transport, Community Safety and Liaison	Willies Mchunu	2009	2013	ANC
MEC for Transport, Community Safety and Liaison	Bheki Cele	2009	2009	ANC
MEC for Local Government and Traditional Affairs	Nomusa Dube-Ncube	2009	2013	ANC
MEC for Local Government and Traditional Affairs	Willies Mchunu	2009	2009	ANC
MEC for Social Development	Weziwe Thusi	2011	2013	ANC
MEC for Social Development	Meshack Radebe	2009	2011	ANC
MEC for Arts, Culture, Sports and Recreation	Ntombikayise Sibhidla-Saphetha	2011	2013	ANC
MEC for Arts, Culture, Sports and Recreation	Weziwe Thusi	2009	2011	ANC

== Senzo Mchunu premiership: 2013–2016 ==
When Senzo Mchunu succeeded Zweli Mkhize as Premier in September 2013, he retained Mkhize's Executive Council but appointed Peggy Nkonyeni to replace himself as MEC for Education. Following the next general election in May 2014, in which Mchunu was elected to a full term as Premier, he again largely preserved the composition of the Executive Council; he made only two new appointments, replacing the MEC for Finance and MEC for Agriculture. He also effected a minor restructuring of the Executive Council, transferring environmental affairs from the Agriculture and Rural Development portfolio to the Economic Development and Tourism portfolio.

KwaZulu-Natal Executive Council 2013–2016
Post	Member	Term		Party
Premier of KwaZulu-Natal	Senzo Mchunu	2013	2016	ANC
MEC for Finance	Belinda Scott	2014	2016	ANC
MEC for Finance	Ina Cronje	2013	2014	ANC
MEC for Health	Sibongiseni Dhlomo	2013	2016	ANC
MEC for Education	Peggy Nkonyeni	2013	2016	ANC
MEC for Economic Development, Tourism and Environmental Affairs	Mike Mabuyakhulu	2014	2016	ANC
MEC for Economic Development and Environmental Affairs	Mike Mabuyakhulu	2013	2014	ANC
MEC for Agriculture and Rural Development	Cyril Xaba	2014	2016	ANC
MEC for Agriculture, Environmental Affairs and Rural Development	Meshack Radebe	2013	2014	ANC
MEC for Human Settlement and Public Works	Ravi Pillay	2013	2016	ANC
MEC for Transport, Community Safety and Liaison	Willies Mchunu	2013	2016	ANC
MEC for Cooperative and Traditional Affairs	Nomusa Dube-Ncube	2013	2016	ANC
MEC for Social Development	Weziwe Thusi	2013	2016	ANC
MEC for Arts, Culture, Sports and Recreation	Ntombikayise Sibhidla-Saphetha	2013	2016	ANC

== Willies Mchunu premiership: 2016–2019 ==
Willies Mchunu replaced Senzo Mchunu as Premier in May 2016 and the following month he announced a reshuffle of the Executive Council, in which he fired four MECs and appointed Mxolisi Kaunda to take over his own former portfolio as MEC for Transport and Community Safety. Senzo Mchunu's supporters described the reshuffle as a purge of politicians who had supported Senzo Mchunu's failed bid to gain re-election as Provincial Chairperson of the governing ANC.

KwaZulu-Natal Executive Council 2016–2019
Post	Member	Term		Party
Premier of KwaZulu-Natal	Willies Mchunu	2016	2019	ANC
MEC for Finance	Belinda Scott	2016	2019	ANC
MEC for Health	Sibongiseni Dhlomo	2016	2019	ANC
MEC for Education	Mthandeni Dlungwana	2016	2019	ANC
MEC for Education	Peggy Nkonyeni	2016	2016	ANC
MEC for Economic Development, Tourism and Environmental Affairs	Sihle Zikalala	2016	2019	ANC
MEC for Economic Development, Tourism and Environmental Affairs	Mike Mabuyakhulu	2016	2016	ANC
MEC for Agriculture and Rural Development	Themba Mthembu	2016	2019	ANC
MEC for Agriculture and Rural Development	Cyril Xaba	2016	2016	ANC
MEC for Human Settlement and Public Works	Ravi Pillay	2016	2019	ANC
MEC for Transport, Community Safety and Liaison	Mxolisi Kaunda	2016	2019	ANC
MEC for Cooperative and Traditional Affairs	Nomusa Dube-Ncube	2016	2019	ANC
MEC for Social Development	Weziwe Thusi	2016	2019	ANC
MEC for Arts, Culture, Sports and Recreation	Bongi Sithole-Moloi	2016	2019	ANC
MEC for Arts, Culture, Sports and Recreation	Ntombikayise Sibhidla-Saphetha	2016	2016	ANC

== Zikalala premiership: 2019–2022 ==
Pursuant to the May 2019 general election, Sihle Zikalala was elected Premier and announced his new Executive Council. On 11 September 2019, he appointed Bheki Ntuli as MEC for Transport, Community Safety and Liaison; Ntuli succeeded Mxolisi Kaunda, who had left the provincial government to become Mayor of eThekwini. On 17 November 2020, Zikalala announced that Nomusa Dube-Ncube, formerly the MEC for Economic Development, Tourism and Environmental Affairs, had swopped portfolios with Ravi Pillay, formerly the MEC for Finance. In January 2021, Ntuli died; he was replaced in March by Peggy Nkonyeni, formerly the MEC for Public Works and Human Settlement, who in turn was replaced by Jomo Sibiya.

KwaZulu-Natal Executive Council 2019–2022
Post	Member	Term		Party
Premier of KwaZulu-Natal	Sihle Zikalala	2019	2022	ANC
MEC for Finance	Nomusa Dube-Ncube	2020	2022	ANC
MEC for Finance	Ravi Pillay	2019	2020	ANC
MEC for Health	Nomagugu Simelane-Zulu	2019	2022	ANC
MEC for Education	Kwazi Mshengu	2019	2022	ANC
MEC for Economic Development, Tourism and Environmental Affairs	Ravi Pillay	2020	2022	ANC
MEC for Economic Development, Tourism and Environmental Affairs	Nomusa Dube-Ncube	2019	2020	ANC
MEC for Agriculture and Rural Development	Bongi Sithole-Moloi	2019	2022	ANC
MEC for Public Works and Human Settlement	Jomo Sibiya	2021	2022	ANC
MEC for Public Works and Human Settlement	Peggy Nkonyeni	2019	2021	ANC
MEC for Transport, Community Safety and Liaison	Peggy Nkonyeni	2021	2022	ANC
MEC for Transport, Community Safety and Liaison	Bheki Ntuli	2019	2021	ANC
MEC for Transport, Community Safety and Liaison	Mxolisi Kaunda	2019	2019	ANC
MEC for Cooperative Governance and Traditional Affairs	Sipho Hlomuka	2019	2022	ANC
MEC for Social Development	Nonhlanhla Khoza	2019	2022	ANC
MEC for Arts and Culture, Sports and Recreation	Hlengiwe Mavimbela	2019	2022	ANC

== Dube-Ncube premiership: 2022–2024 ==
On 10 August 2022, Nomusa Dube-Ncube was elected Premier following Sihle Zikalala's resignation from the office; she announced her new Executive Council the following day, making several significant changes from Zikalala's cabinet. In late January 2023, the ANC announced that Zikalala would resign from his position as MEC for Cooperative Governance and Traditional Affairs in order to join the National Assembly; Bongi Sithole-Moloi took over his position in the Executive Council a week later, and Sithole's former portfolio, Agriculture and Rural Development, was in turn filled by Super Zuma. The Executive Council was reshuffled once again on 23 May 2023 to fill the vacancy created by the resignation of Amanda Mapena. The MEC for Public Works and Human Settlement Ntuthuko Mahlaba was appointed to succeed Mapena as the MEC for Sports, Arts and Culture while Sipho Nkosi joined the Executive Council and took over Mahlaba's position.

KwaZulu-Natal Executive Council 2022–2024
Post	Member	Term		Party
Premier of KwaZulu-Natal	Nomusa Dube-Ncube	2022	2024	ANC
MEC for Finance	Peggy Nkonyeni	2022	2024	ANC
MEC for Health	Nomagugu Simelane-Zulu	2022	2024	ANC
MEC for Education	Mbali Frazer	2022	2024	ANC
MEC for Economic Development, Tourism and Environmental Affairs	Siboniso Duma	2022	2024	ANC
MEC for Agriculture and Rural Development	Super Zuma	2022	2024	ANC
MEC for Agriculture and Rural Development	Bongi Sithole-Moloi	2022	2023	ANC
MEC for Public Works and Human Settlement	Sipho Nkosi	2023	2024	ANC
MEC for Public Works and Human Settlement	Ntuthuko Mahlaba	2022	2023	ANC
MEC for Transport, Community Safety and Liaison	Sipho Hlomuka	2022	2024	ANC
MEC for Cooperative Governance and Traditional Affairs	Bongi Sithole-Moloi	2023	2024	ANC
MEC for Cooperative Governance and Traditional Affairs	Sihle Zikalala	2022	2023	ANC
MEC for Social Development	Nonhlanhla Khoza	2022	2024	ANC
MEC for Sports, Arts and Culture	Ntuthuko Mahlaba	2023	2024	ANC
MEC for Sports, Arts and Culture	Amanda Mapena	2022	2023	ANC

== Ntuli premiership: 2024–present ==
No party won a majority of seats in the KwaZulu-Natal Provincial Legislature in the 2024 provincial election. The African National Congress, previously the party's governing party, collapsed to third place while the newly established uMkhonto weSizwe won a plurality of seats in the legislature. The Inkatha Freedom Party won the second-most seats in the legislature and opted to form a "Provincial Government of Unity" with the ANC, the Democratic Alliance, and the National Freedom Party. The IFP's Thami Ntuli was elected Premier of KwaZulu-Natal, while the ANC and the DA received the Speaker and Deputy Speaker position in the legislature. On 18 June 2024, Ntuli announced his Executive Council comprising four IFP members, three ANC members, two DA members and one NFP member.

KwaZulu-Natal Executive Council 2024
Post	Member	Term		Party
Premier of KwaZulu-Natal	Thami Ntuli	2024	Incumbent	IFP
MEC for Finance	Francois Rodgers	2024	Incumbent	DA
MEC for Health	Nomagugu Simelane	2024	Incumbent	ANC
MEC for Education	Sipho Hlomuka	2024	Incumbent	ANC
MEC for Economic Development, Tourism and Environmental Affairs	Musa Zondi	2024	Incumbent	IFP
MEC for Agriculture and Rural Development	Thembeni kaMadlopha-Mthethwa	2024	Incumbent	IFP
MEC for Transport and Human Settlements	Siboniso Duma	2024	Incumbent	ANC
MEC for Social Development	Mbali Shinga	2024	Incumbent	NFP
MEC for Cooperative Governance and Traditional Affairs	Thulasizwe Buthelezi	2024	Incumbent	IFP
MEC for Public Works and Infrastructure	Martin Meyer	2024	Incumbent	DA
MEC for Sports, Arts and Culture	Mntomuhle Khawula	2024	Incumbent	IFP

== See also ==
- Template: KwaZulu-Natal Executive Council
- Government of South Africa
- Constitution of South Africa
- Natal province
- KwaZulu homeland
