= Thulasizwe Buthelezi =

South African politician (born 1981)

Thulasizwe Buthelezi MPL
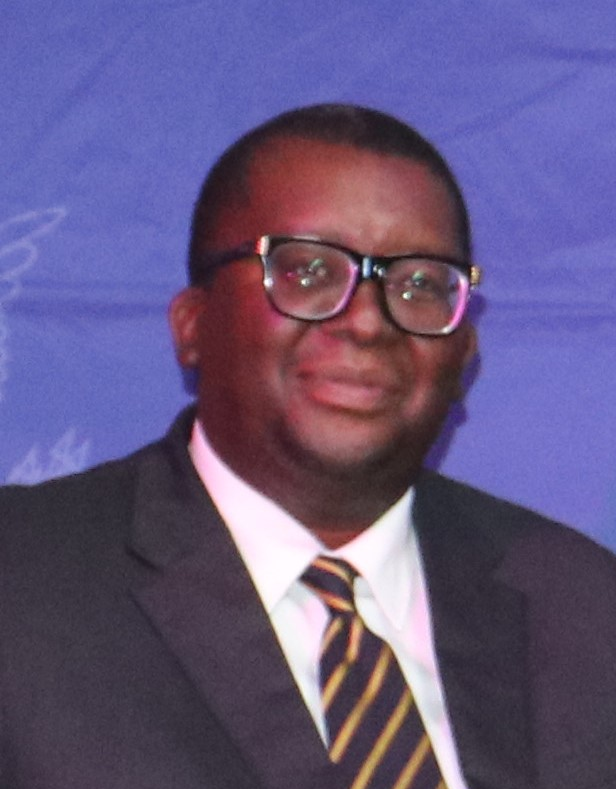
- Buthelezi in 2024

Member of the KwaZulu-Natal Executive Council for Cooperative Governance and Traditional Affairs
- Incumbent
- Assumed office 23 June 2024
- Premier: Thami Ntuli
- Preceded by: Bongi Sithole-Moloi

Member of the KwaZulu-Natal Legislature
- Incumbent
- Assumed office 14 June 2024

Mayor of Zululand
- In office November 2017 – 13 June 2024
- Preceded by: Mzamo Buthelezi
- Succeeded by: Michael Khumalo

Personal details
- Born: Thulasizwe Dominic Buthelezi; 12 June 1981 (age 45) Nongoma, South Africa
- Party: Inkatha Freedom Party
- Education: University of KwaZulu-Natal

Thulasizwe Dominic Buthelezi (born 12 June 1981) is a South African politician from KwaZulu-Natal. A member of the Inkatha Freedom Party (IFP), he is Member of the Executive Council (MEC) for Cooperative Governance and Traditional Affairs in KwaZulu-Natal. He is also the traditional prime minister to the King of the Zulu Nation, King Misuzulu Zulu.

Born in Nongoma, Buthelezi rose to prominence as the chairperson of the IFP Youth Brigade. He was the mayor of Zululand District Municipality between November 2017 and June 2024, when he joined the KwaZulu-Natal Legislature and KwaZulu-Natal Executive Council. He was first appointed as King Misuzulu's prime minister in January 2024, succeeding Mangosuthu Buthelezi.

== Early life and education ==
Buthelezi was born on 12 June 1981 in Nongoma in present-day KwaZulu-Natal. He is Zulu and has said that his great-great-grandfather fought at the Battle of Isandlwana. His father was Bishop Lawrence Buthelezi, a pastor who was active in the Inkatha Freedom Party (IFP).

He attended St Francis College, a Catholic school in Mariannhill, and obtained a degree in public administration from the University of KwaZulu-Natal.

== Early political career ==
Buthelezi rose to political prominence in the youth wing of the IFP, the IFP Youth Brigade (IFPYB). He was deputy chairperson of the IFPYB until October 2004, when he was elevated to chairperson after the incumbent chair, Sibusisiwe Ngubane, resigned; his elevation caused tension in the IFPYB among those who argued that Ngubane's successor should be selected in an open election. At the IFPYB's next national elective conference in October 2005, Buthelezi was unanimously elected to continue in the chairmanship position, with Pat Lebenya as his deputy.

During his tenure at the head of the IFPYB, Buthelezi was an outspoken supporter of the IFP's founder and longtime national leader, Mangosuthu Buthelezi. In a 2005 letter to the editor, he said that calls for Buthelezi to retire or cede his leadership position were "preposterous".

=== Corruption charges ===
On 30 June 2005, Buthelezi was arrested at a hotel in Woodstock, Cape Town in a sting operation; at the time, he was a trainee at a private shipping company, Safmarine, and a bidder for a Safmarine contract had reported him to the police after he allegedly solicited a R350,000 bribe from the potential contractor's chief executive officer. He appeared in a magistrate's court in Cape Town on criminal charges and was released on R3,000 bail.

In December 2006, after several procedural delays, he opted to stand trial on fraud charges in lieu of plea bargaining. The Cape Town Regional Court convicted Buthelezi in February 2009 and sentenced him to five years in prison. He appealed.

=== KwaZulu-Natal Legislature ===
Buthelezi's employer, Safmarine, fired him on disciplinary grounds during his corruption trial, and Buthelezi subsequently joined the KwaZulu-Natal Legislature as a representative of the IFP. In the April 2009 general election, he was elected to a full term in his seat. However, the IFP was not able to form a provincial government during the Fourth Legislature, and he resigned from his legislative seat to become a full-time pastor in Zululand.

== Mayor of Zululand: 2017–2024 ==
Buthelezi returned to prominence in November 2017 as the mayor of Zululand District Municipality in KwaZulu-Natal. He was elected at a special meeting of the IFP-led council after the incumbent mayor, Mzamo Buthelezi, left the province to serve in the National Assembly. In his inaugural speech, Buthelezi said that his three focuses as mayor would be corruption and wasteful expenditure, water provision, and employment-creating economic growth. He was re-elected to a full term in the mayoral office after the November 2021 local elections, but the IFP lost its majority in Zululand in that election; it narrowly retained control of the council through a coalition with the Economic Freedom Fighters (EFF), whose representative, Thulani Ndlovu, was appointed as deputy mayor under Buthelezi.

=== Controversies ===
In 2019, the former head of technical services in the Zululand municipality, Emannuel Sibusiso Ngcobo, alleged that he had resigned because Buthelezi had threatened to kill him when he refused to acquiesce in Buthelezi's demands to award municipal tenders to his friends and relatives. Members of amaDelangokubona had reportedly been arrested for Ngcobo; during the trial, Ngcobo said that the defendants had come to his office and announced that they had been hired by the mayor and would kill him if he did not resign from the municipality. Buthelezi denied interfering in tender processes, said he did not know any members of amaDelangokubona, and was quoted by the Sunday Tribune as saying, "Why would I need to threaten Mr Ngcobo? I'm the mayor—he is just a manager with a five-year contract."

In 2020, the provincial government of KwaZulu-Natal—through a provincial minister, Sipho Hlomuka—commissioned a forensic investigation into maladministration, fraud and corruption in Buthelezi's mayoral administration. In 2020, the final report of the investigation recommended that Buthelezi be removed from his post. The investigation had reportedly found multiple abuses, including irregular expenditure on Buthelezi's security (some fourteen bodyguards), irregular expenditure on a R66,000 "donation" to a local oil distributor at Buthelezi's instruction, and improper intervention by Buthelezi in certain tender processes hiring processes. However, in May 2022, the Pietermaritzburg High Court set aside the report of the investigation as invalid on procedural grounds. Buthelezi welcomed the judgment, saying that it proved that the investigation had been a "political hatchet job" by the African National Congress (ANC), which controlled the provincial government. The IFP's national president, Velenkosini Hlabisa, agreed that the ANC provincial government and Hlomuka had clearly abused their power to "fight[] political battles using taxpayers' money".

Buthelezi remained embattled during his second mayoral term. Immediately after the 2021 elections, he announced that he would audit the qualifications of managers employed by the municipality; within a fortnight, he had fired seven senior managers, purportedly upon discovering that they did not have appropriate qualifications for their roles. Other political parties in the council, the EFF and ANC, said that they had heard credible reports that Buthelezi was vicitimising and firing municipal employees who had campaigned for parties other than the IFP, such as the National Freedom Party (NFP), during the recent elections. The ANC criticized Buthelezi for effecting the dismissals "on his own lunacy" without council authorisation or due process, and the EFF threatened to withdraw from the nascent coalition.

In March 2022, a local community activist wrote to the provincial government alleging that Buthelezi was "on a corruption spree" in Zululand and had, among other things, spent R240 million in unbudgeted municipal funds on security for himself and his wife. The activist and others marched on Buthelezi's office in Ulundi in protest. Buthelezi dismissed the allegations, saying that the activist "must go and complete his junior degree... Thereafter we can engage at the same level." In a later, more formal statement, the municipality said that the allegations were "absurd and totally untrue". The opposition ANC tabled a motion of no confidence in Buthelezi's leadership, saying that several members of Buthelezi's own IFP caucus would secretly support the motion. The EFF initially said that it would abstain from the vote if the IFP was indeed divided on Buthelezi's leadership; ultimately, however, the EFF blocked the motion of no confidence, allegedly after an intervention by the EFF's national leadership.

In 2023, the opposition NFP accused Buthelezi of inciting the ongoing political violence against NFP councillors in Nongoma, where the NFP had recently unseated the IFP's Albert Mncwango from the mayoral office. NFP secretary-general Canaan Mdletshe pointed to a video of Buthelezi addressing IFP supporters about the Nongoma mayoral election, in which Buthelezi said, "As the IFP, we are not going to allow the theft of Nongoma Municipality. If there is a need for us to be arrested today, we are going to be arrested."

In January 2024, the EFF alleged that R33 million had disappeared from the municipal accounts. The party called for a forensic investigation, to include investigation of Buthelezi's own bank accounts, and for Buthelezi's removal. The municipality said that the statement was false, "another desperate and futile attempt to derail Zululand's unparallel record of service delivery" under Buthelezi.

=== Sexual harassment allegations ===
Also in 2023, the press printed an anonymous email purportedly written by a female employee of the Zululand municipality to representatives of various provincial departments and labour unions. In the email, the employee said that female municipal employees were subject to systematic sexual harassment by Buthelezi and that, "If we fail to accede to the Mayor’s satanic sexual desires we are ill-treated, told that we will be destroyed professionally." The anonymous complainant said that she had had sex with Buthelezi out of fear of losing her job and that she knew other employees, including a grandchild of the late Zulu king Goodwill Zwelithini, who had been summarily fired after refusing to do so. Buthelezi denied the allegations, saying they were part of a smear campaign by the ANC and NFP.

The scandal continued to simmer. In early 2024, the ANC's branch in the region released a statement tallying allegations that at least six women had been dismissed for rejecting Buthelezi's sexual advances; noting that Buthelezi "has failed consistently to clear his name", the party called on the Chapter 9 institutions to investigate the allegations. An individual ANC leader, Nomagugu Simelane, publicly questioned why Zulu traditional leaders had not held Buthelezi accountable for "tell[ing] employees that 'before I pay your salary that you have worked for come and sleepover at my place first'" and "ask[ing] for sexual favors from married women"; Buthelezi sent her a cease-and-desist letter, threatening defamation charges, which the ANC Women's League shared on social media and disparaged as "bullying".

In April 2024, one woman, the former director for community services in the municipality, won a lawsuit against the municipality in the Pietermaritzburg High Court, alleging that she had been fired for rejecting Buthelezi's sexual advances and obtaining a restraining order against him; the court held that the municipality's stated reason for the dismissal—inadequate qualifications—was unsubstantiated and that her dismissal had constituted breach of contract.

=== Appointment as Zulu prime minister ===
In January 2024, the King of the Zulu Nation, King Misuzulu Zulu, announced that Buthelezi had been appointed as his traditional prime minister, the royal office given to the king's senior advisor. The prime minister role had been held for the last seventy years by Mangosuthu Buthelezi, who had acted as a mentor to Buthelezi before his death in September 2023. King Misuzulu also appointed Inkosi Phathisizwe Chiliza as deputy prime minister, a new position, under Buthelezi. Prince Mbonisi Zulu, the king's uncle and a pretender to the throne, said that Buthelezi's appointment was illegitimate because of ongoing challenges to the propriety of the king's own coronation. The ANC, then the incumbent governing party in KwaZulu-Natal, said that it did not recognize the traditional prime minister position—arguably invented by Mangosuthu Buthelezi in the twentieth century—as a position of any constitutional authority.

In February 2024, delivering his maiden speech to the Zulu nation, Buthelezi suggested that he would henceforth oversee all communication from the king's office—but the king's office responded with a press statement saying that the communication function would in fact continue to reside with the king's spokesman, Prince Africa Zulu. However, Buthelezi quickly became involved in the king's campaign to reform the governance of the Ingonyama Trust to increase royal control over communal land in the province.

In a highly publicised incident in March 2024, Buthelezi was addressing a government event in honour of King Dinuzulu ka Cetshwayo when Siboniso Duma, the ANC's provincial chairperson and a provincial government minister, entered the stage and snatched the microphone away from Buthelezi, interrupting his speech. The ANC said that Duma was attempting to prevent Buthelezi from making remarks that would stoke political tensions or "embarrass" King Misizulu or President Cyril Ramaphosa, both of whom were present. The incident led to a serious row between the ANC and IFP.

=== Succession ===
After the May 2024 general election, Buthelezi resigned from the Zululand mayoral office on 13 June 2024, tipped for a position in the provincial government. The IFP's Michael Khumalo succeeded him as mayor.

== KwaZulu-Natal Government: 2024–present ==
In the May 2024 election, Buthelezi was elected to return to the KwaZulu-Natal Legislature, ranked ninth on the IFP's provincial party list. In the provincial election, the IFP was the second-largest party, and it returned to KwaZulu-Natal government after over a decade in opposition; the IFP's Thami Ntuli was elected as Premier of KwaZulu-Natal at the head of a coalition government that also included the ANC, the NFP, and the Democratic Alliance (DA). Announcing his Executive Council on 18 June, Ntuli named Buthelezi as Member of the Executive Council (MEC) for Cooperative Governance and Traditional Affairs. Commentators said that the appointment was strategically clever because of Buthelezi's connections to the Zulu royal family, though some warned of a potential conflict of interest.

=== Policy initiatives ===
Buthelezi's department was responsible for overseeing the provincial government's interventions in embattled municipalities in the province. Soon after his appointment, Buthelezi announced an intervention in eThekwini Metropolitan Municipality under section 154 of the Constitution. In subsequent months he publicly threatened to authorise a more intrusive intervention there under section 139 of the Constitution. The following year, he launched a section 139 intervention and corruption investigation in uMkhanyakude District Municipality. Because both eThekwini and uMkhanyakude were run by mayors selected by the IFP's provincial coalition partner, the ANC, these moves caused tensions in the provincial coalition. The ANC's provincial leaders singled out Buthelezi for criticism in a press conference, with ANC provincial chairperson Siboniso Duma suggesting that Buthelezi's policies were divisive and politically motivated and Duma's deputy, Nomagugu Simelane, saying that, while the IFP and ANC generally worked well together, Buthelezi was a "rotten potato". Buthelezi responded that he answered to the premier, not to the ANC, and dismissed the ANC's accusations as "the highest form of political imbecility and tactical opportunism".

Also in 2024, Buthelezi announced a plan to open a new and primary ministerial office in Ulundi in Zululand—the former KwaZulu capital and stronghold of former IFP leader Mangosuthu Buthelezi—at substantial cost to the provincial government. Premier Ntuli intervened in December 2024 to announce the postponement of Buthelezi's planned move, reportedly after the plan faced resistance from civil servants and the IFP's coalition partners. Ntuli noted that it would be inconsistent with the ministerial handbook to open the Ulundi office and that "some technical and administrative arrangements" therefore had to be made before the move could proceed. The National Education, Health and Allied Workers Union welcomed Ntuli's intervention, saying that Buthelezi's plans for the Ulundi office were part of his campaign to purge his department of civil servants who were members of the ANC.

As MEC, Buthelezi unveiled the rollout of state-owned mobile water tankers in uThukela District; he said that, in municipalities facing water shortages, they would reduce dependence on hired tankers owned by private contractors. In May 2026, the IFP's coalition partner, the DA, said that it would submit parliamentary questions about the initiative after it emerged that the tankers were decorated with large images of Buthelezi's own face; the DA suggested that this could constitute misuse of state resources for party-political purposes in the run-up to the November 2026 local elections.

Also in 2026, the DA and opposition MK Party both questioned Buthelezi's use of R19 million in public funds to procure cars for Zulu chiefs in the province. The department said the vehicle procurement programme was a "historic" intervention that would capacitate the traditional leaders to serve their communities "with dignity and efficiency".

After the unveiling of statues of ANC icons Nelson Mandela and Oliver Tambo in Durban, Buthelezi called for the erection of a statue of Mangosuthu Buthelezi, arguing that the memorial to the anti-apartheid struggle would be incomplete without it.

=== Zulu prime minister role ===
In December 2024, sources told the Mail & Guardian that the king was under substantial pressure from political parties and members of the royal family to fire Buthelezi from his position as traditional prime minister, because of concerns that Buthelezi was exploiting his dual government and royal roles in a manner that was undermining political stability in the province.

Indeed, later that month, King Misuzulu announced that he had dismissed Buthelezi with immediate effect. Though the king did not explain his reasons for the decision, News24 reported that Buthelezi's "conduct" had not lived up to the king's expectations. In a statement, Buthelezi said that he found the announcement "astonishing", especially as he had been informed of his removal in a WhatsApp from a prince rather than by the king directly.

Buthelezi was absent from the office for just under a year before Misuzulu abruptly reappointed him to it on 2 December 2025. In 2026, MK Party accused Buthelezi of driving a wedge between the king and his other advisors and "leveraging his position in the royal house to settle personal scores".

== Personal life ==
Buthelezi is married.
