= Bongi Sithole-Moloi =

South African politician

Member of the KwaZulu-Natal Executive Council for Cooperative Governance and Traditional Affairs
- In office 7 February 2023 – 14 June 2024
- Premier: Nomusa Dube-Ncube
- Preceded by: Sihle Zikalala
- Succeeded by: Thulasizwe Buthelezi

Member of the KwaZulu-Natal Provincial Legislature
- In office 21 May 2014 – 28 May 2024

Member of the KwaZulu-Natal Executive Council for Agriculture and Rural Development
- In office May 2019 – 6 February 2023
- Premier: Sihle Zikalala; Nomusa Dube-Ncube
- Preceded by: Themba Mthembu
- Succeeded by: Super Zuma

Member of the KwaZulu-Natal Executive Council for Arts, Culture, Sports and Recreation
- In office May 2016 – May 2019
- Premier: Willies Mchunu
- Preceded by: Ntombikayise Sibhidla-Saphetha
- Succeeded by: Hlengiwe Mavimbela

Executive Mayor of uMgungundlovu District Municipality
- In office December 2000 – March 2008
- Preceded by: Municipality established
- Succeeded by: Yusuf Bhamjee

Personal details
- Born: Bongiwe Nomusa Sithole
- Citizenship: South Africa
- Party: African National Congress
- Spouse(s): Zibuse Mlaba (divorced) Lucky Moloi

Bongiwe Nomusa Sithole-Moloi (née Sithole) is a South African politician who served as KwaZulu-Natal's Member of the Executive Council (MEC) for Cooperative Governance and Traditional Affairs from February 2023 until June 2024. She represented the African National Congress (ANC) in the KwaZulu-Natal Provincial Legislature from 2014 until May 2024.

Sithole-Moloi was a member of the KwaZulu-Natal Executive Council from 2016 until 2024. Before being appointed as the MEC for Cooperative Governance and Traditional Affairs, she was the MEC for Arts, Culture, Sports and Recreation from 2016 to 2019 and MEC for Agriculture and Rural Development from 2019 to 2023. She gained political prominence as the Mayor of Umgungundlovu District Municipality from 2000 to 2008; she was removed from that position in a vote of no-confidence supported by her own party.

== Mayor of Umgungundlovu: 2000–2008 ==
Sithole-Moloi became active in the ANC in the Natal Midlands in the early 1990s, and she represented the party as the Mayor of Umgungundlovu between 2000 and 2008. She was removed from the mayoral office by her own party in a vote of no-confidence in 2008. Her removal was reportedly related to allegations of corruption and maladministration, including the accusation that R1.5 million in municipal funds had been misappropriated and channelled to businessman Lucky Moloi, whom she later married. The allegations were never tested in court and Sithole-Moloi denied them.

In 2009, Sithole-Moloi was appointed head of the directorate for dispute resolution in the provincial Department of Local Government, then under MEC Mike Mabuyakhulu. The opposition Inkatha Freedom Party alleged that her appointment had been "riddled with irregularities" and that the department appeared to have created the post for Sithole-Moloi. The provincial government denied this charge, saying that Sithole-Moloi had applied for the post after the vacancy was advertised publicly.

== Provincial legislature: 2014–present ==
In the 2014 general election, Sithole-Moloi was elected to a seat in the KwaZulu-Natal Provincial Legislature, ranked 29th on the ANC's provincial party list. The ANC caucus elected her to chair the legislature's committee for the Premier's office and Zulu royal household. In May 2016, she was appointed to the KwaZulu-Natal Executive Council in a cabinet reshuffle by Willies Mchunu, who had recently taken office as Premier; she was named MEC for Arts, Culture, Sports and Recreation. Sources told IOL that Sithole-Moloi owed the promotion to her loyalty to Sihle Zikalala, then the ANC's Provincial Chairperson in KwaZulu-Natal; Sithole-Moloi had apparently begun to support Zikalala after 2008, when her removal from the mayoral office strained her relationship with Senzo Mchunu, her former ally and Zikalala's rival and predecessor.

She remained in office as MEC for Arts and Culture until the 2019 general election, in which she was re-elected to her legislative seat, ranked 30th on the ANC's party list. Newly elected Premier Sihle Zikalala appointed her as MEC for Agriculture and Rural Development. She was retained in that position by Zikalala's successor, Premier Nomusa Dube-Ncube.

In 2022, Sithole-Moloi was named as a possible candidate for election to a top leadership position in the provincial ANC. She was nominated to stand for the position of ANC Deputy Provincial Secretary by the KwaZulu-Natal branch of the ANC Women's League and by local party branches in Zululand. When the party's next provincial elective conference was held in July 2022, she was not elected to a top position but was re-elected to the ANC's Provincial Executive Committee.

On 7 February 2023, following Sihle Zikalala's resignation from the provincial legislature, Premier Dube-Ncube effected a minor cabinet reshuffle in which Sithole-Moloi replaced Zikalala as MEC for Cooperative Governance and Traditional Affairs. Sithole-Moloi left the provincial legislature and the provincial government in 2024.

== Personal life ==
Sithole-Moloi was divorced from Inkosi Zibuse Mlaba, an ANC politician and the former KwaXimba regent. She subsequently married businessman and politician Lucky Moloi, who is a former Regional Secretary and Regional Chairperson of the ANC's Inkosi Bhambatha branch in Umzinyathi. Moloi held the regional chairmanship from 2019 to 2022, having won election in a contest against Jomo Sibiya, his wife's colleague in the provincial legislature.
