= Ntuthuko Mahlaba =

South African politician and healthcare practitioner (1981/1982–2026)

Member of the Executive Council of KwaZulu-Natal for Sports, Arts and Culture
- In office 23 May 2023 – 14 June 2024
- Premier: Nomusa Dube-Ncube
- Preceded by: Amanda Bani-Mapena
- Succeeded by: Mntomuhle Khawula

Member of the Executive Council of KwaZulu-Natal for Human Settlements and Public Works
- In office 11 August 2022 – 23 May 2023
- Premier: Nomusa Dube-Ncube
- Preceded by: Jomo Sibiya
- Succeeded by: Sipho Nkosi

Member of the KwaZulu-Natal Legislature
- In office 10 August 2022 – 4 July 2026

Executive Mayor of the Newcastle Local Municipality
- In office 1 March 2019 – 31 October 2021
- Preceded by: Makhosini Nkosi
- Succeeded by: Xolani Dube

Personal details
- Born: 1981 or 1982
- Died: 4 July 2026 (aged 44)
- Party: African National Congress
- Profession: Healthcare practitioner, politician

Nkululeko Ntuthuko Mahlaba (1981 or 1982 – 4 July 2026) was a South African politician and healthcare practitioner. A member of the African National Congress, he served as the party's provincial treasurer in KwaZulu-Natal as well as the chairperson of the party's Mbuso Kubheka Region (formerly eMalahleni). From August 2022 to May 2023, he was the MEC for Human Settlements and Public Works and he then served as the MEC for Sports, Arts and Culture from August 2022 until June 2024. Mahlaba previously served as the executive mayor of the Newcastle Local Municipality from 2019 to 2021.

== Career and criminal charges ==
In May 2018, Mahlaba was elected as the chairperson of the ANC's Emalahleni region. He was sworn in as an ANC councillor of the Newcastle Local Municipality in October 2018. During a special council meeting on 1 March 2019, Mahlaba was elected as the mayor of the municipality following the sudden resignation of Makhosini Nkosi. On 22 March 2019, Mahalaba was arrested after he was allegedly linked to the attempted murder of ANCYL leader, Mafika Ndamane and the murder of ex-ANC Youth League member, Wandile Ngobeni. In August 2019, the charges of murder and attempted murder against Mahlaba were dropped due to a lack of witnesses willing to testify.

On 26 July 2021, Mahlaba appeared in the Newcastle Magistrate's Court on charges of robbery, attempted murder, malicious damage to property, theft and incitement of violence and assault with intent to do grievous bodily harm over an incident in September 2020 where Mahlaba, Njabulo Mabaso, Sgananda Shezi assaulted employees of a fibre subcontractor in the Aviary Hill area in Newcastle. In August, the provincial ANC leadership removed Mahlaba as a councillor candidate ahead of the local government elections due to the charges. Mahlaba was re-elected unopposed as the regional chairperson of the ANC in eMalahleni on 7 September 2021. Mahlaba left office as mayor of Newcastle on 31 October 2021. He was found guilty by the Newcastle Regional Court for incitement to commit assault on 22 November 2021 and was fined R20,000.

In June 2022, Mahlaba announced his intention to contest a leadership position at the ANC's provincial elective conference in July 2022. He was on ANC MPL Siboniso Duma's "Taliban" slate, a group of candidates sympathetic to former party president Jacob Zuma. At the ANC's conference on 23 July 2022, Mahlaba defeated the MEC for Human Settlements and Public Works, Jomo Sibiya to become the next provincial treasurer of the ANC as candidates linked to the "Taliban" faction made a clean sweep of all the provincial leadership positions.

== Provincial government ==
Following Mahlaba's appointment to the provincial legislature, sources said that Mahlaba would be appointed to the provincial executive council as the MEC for Health, since Mahlaba was a medical doctor. The defeated provincial chairperson, Sihle Zikalala resigned as premier of KwaZulu-Natal on 5 August 2022. Before Finance MEC Nomusa Dube-Ncube's election and inauguration as premier, Mahlaba was sworn in as a member of the KwaZulu-Natal Legislature on 10 August. The following day, Mahlaba was appointed the MEC for Human Settlements and Public Works by Dube-Ncube.

During a mini reshuffle of the KwaZulu-Natal executive council on 23 May 2023, he was appointed MEC for Sports, Arts and Culture. He replaced Amanda Bani-Mapena who resigned in early-April 2023, while Sipho Nkosi took over as MEC for Public Works and Human Settlements. He was re-elected to the provincial legislature in the 2024 provincial election but was not reappointed to the Executive Council.

== Death ==
Mahlaba was involved in a car collision while jogging on the morning of 4 July 2026. He died later that day, at the age of 44.
