= Blessed Gwala =

South African politician (born 1955)

Blessed Gwala MPL

Member of the KwaZulu-Natal Legislature
- Incumbent
- Assumed office 2011
- In office 1994–2010

National Chairperson of the Inkatha Freedom Party
- Incumbent
- Assumed office 2012
- President: Mangosuthu Buthelezi; Velenkosini Hlabisa
- Deputy: Albert Mncwango; Thembeni Mthethwa

Mayor of Zululand
- In office 2010–2011
- Preceded by: Zanele Magwaza-Msibi
- Succeeded by: Zanele Magwaza-Msibi

Member of the KwaZulu-Natal Executive Council for Public Works
- In office 2004–2006
- Premier: S'bu Ndebele
- Preceded by: Mike Mabuyakhulu
- Succeeded by: Lydia Johnson

Personal details
- Born: Muziwenkosi Blessed Gwala; 4 December 1955 (age 70) Eshowe, KwaZulu-Natal; South Africa
- Party: Inkatha Freedom Party

Muziwenkosi Blessed Gwala (born 4 December 1955) is a South African politician from KwaZulu-Natal who is currently serving as the national chairperson of the Inkatha Freedom Party (IFP). He is also the Chief Whip in the KwaZulu-Natal Legislature.

Gwala has served in the KwaZulu-Natal Legislature continuously since the end of apartheid in April 1994, excepting a hiatus as mayor of Zululand District Municipality from 2010 to 2011. During that time, he has served as KwaZulu-Natal's Member of Executive Council (MEC) for Public Works from 2004 to 2006 and as the leader IFP's opposition caucus in the legislature on multiple occasions. He became Chief Whip after the IFP entered the provincial government in the May 2024 general election.

Born in Eshowe, Gwala has been a member of the IFP since 1975; before 1994, he represented the party as a legislator in the apartheid-era KwaZulu homeland. He was elected as IFP national chairperson in September 2012 and was re-elected to a second term in that position in August 2019.

== Early life and career ==
Gwala was born on 4 December 1955 in Eshowe in present-day KwaZulu-Natal, where he grew up. He attended the launch of Mangosuthu Buthelezi's Inkatha in Melmoth in 1975 and became a member of the movement. He spent five years as a representative in the KwaZulu homeland's legislative assembly in the late apartheid period and also rose through the internal ranks of Inkatha, becoming a district secretary for the party and then its chairman in the Uthungulu region.

== Post-apartheid political career ==
Pursuant to South Africa's first post-apartheid elections in April 1994, Gwala was elected to represent Inkatha (by then restyled as the IFP) in the KwaZulu-Natal Legislature. He served there continuously for the next sixteen years. During that time, Gwala served briefly in the KwaZulu-Natal Executive Council between 2004 and 2006. When the IFP lost its majority in the province in the April 2004 general election, the African National Congress (ANC) invited it to govern the province in a coalition, and ANC premier S'bu Ndebele named Gwala as Member of Executive Council (MEC) for Public Works. However, in a November 2006 reshuffle, Ndebele sacked Gwala and replaced him with Lydia Johnson of the ANC. Gwala said that in his brief tenure at the Department of Public Works he had inherited a department that "operates like a headless chicken".

Gwala continued as an ordinary member of the provincial legislature until 2010, when he left briefly to become mayor of KwaZulu-Natal's Zululand District Municipality. He replaced Zanele Magwaza-Msibi, the municipality's popular mayor, whom the IFP had controversially removed amid a rumoured succession battle between Magwaza-Msibi and IFP leader Buthelezi. However, in the August 2011 local elections, Magwaza-Msibi ran under the banner of the new National Freedom Party and, in coalition with the ANC, she succeeded in unseating the IFP and Gwala from control of the Zululand council.

Gwala thus returned to the provincial legislature in 2011. At the IFP's next elective conference, the 34th National General Conference in Ulundi in September 2012, he was elected to one of the party's top offices as national chairperson of the IFP, deputised by Albert Mncwango. The IFP unsuccessfully nominated him for the position of Premier of KwaZulu-Natal in September 2013 after the premiership was vacated by Zweli Mkhize; he lost resoundingly to the ANC's Senzo Mchunu. In the May 2014 general election, Gwala was re-elected to his fifth consecutive term in the provincial legislature and was also elected as leader of the IFP's caucus, though the IFP had lost its status as the official opposition in the legislature.

At the IFP's 35th National General Conference in August 2019, Buthelezi was succeeded in the party presidency by Velenkosini Hlabisa, but Gwala was re-elected to his position as IFP national chairperson, now with Thembeni Mthethwa as his deputy. Hlabisa briefly replaced Gwala as head of the IFP's legislative caucus in KwaZulu-Natal after the 2019 general election, but Gwala served as the party's chief whip and he regained leadership of the caucus—now as Leader of the Opposition— in October 2023, when Hlabisa was elevated to the National Assembly.

In the May 2024 general election, Gwala was re-elected to the provincial legislature, ranked second on the IFP's provincial party list. In the same election, the ANC lost its majority in the province for the first time in two decades, and it formed a coalition government with the IFP and other parties. Gwala was viewed as a possible candidate to serve as premier in such a coalition, in part because former IFP premiers had also been the party's chairperson. However, Thami Ntuli took the premiership, and Gwala was not appointed to Ntuli's Executive Council. He was instead appointed as Chief Whip in the legislature, with the ANC's Celiwe Madlopha as his deputy.
