= Martin Meyer (South African politician) =

South African politician

Martin Meyer MPL
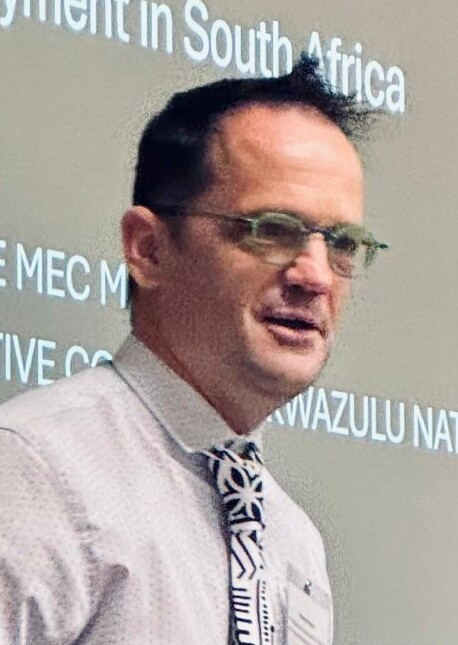
- Meyer in 2025

Member of the KwaZulu-Natal Executive Council for Public Works and Infrastructure
- Incumbent
- Assumed office 18 June 2024
- Premier: Thami Ntuli
- Preceded by: New portfolio

Deputy Provincial Chairperson of the Democratic Alliance in KwaZulu-Natal
- Incumbent
- Assumed office 29 April 2023 Serving with Hannah Winkler, Hlengiwe Shozi

Member of the KwaZulu-Natal Provincial Legislature
- Incumbent
- Assumed office 22 May 2019

Personal details
- Party: Democratic Alliance
- Occupation: Politician

Lukas Marthinus Meyer is a South African politician who has been KwaZulu-Natal's Member of the Executive Council (MEC) for Public Works and Infrastructure since 2024 and a Member of the KwaZulu-Natal Provincial Legislature since May 2019, representing the Democratic Alliance. Meyer had previously served as a DA councillor in the eThekwini Metropolitan Municipality from 2011 to 2019.

== Political career ==
Meyer was elected as a ward councillor in the eThekwini Metropolitan Municipality for the Democratic Alliance in 2011. From 2013 to 2016, he was deputy leader of the DA caucus in the metro and served as the DA whip on the metro's Human Settlements and Infrastructure Committee.

Meyer was elected to the KwaZulu-Natal Provincial Legislature in 2019 as one of 11 DA members. He was then appointed as the DA's spokesperson on Human Settlements and Public Works.

Meyer and DA councillor, Caelee Laing, introduced a resolution to promote legislation to make conversion therapy of LGBTIQ+ youth under the age of 18 illegal at the 2020 Democratic Alliance Federal Congress; the resolution was passed by voting delegates.

In January 2021, Meyer was appointed the party's spokesperson on agriculture and rural development. More than a year later, he was promoted to spokesperson on Cooperative Governance and Traditional Affairs in April 2022. Meyer was elected chairperson of the DA caucus in the provincial legislature in November 2022.

Meyer criticised the South African government for not condemning the controversial Ugandan Anti-Homosexuality Bill, 2023, saying that it is a betrayal of South Africa's queer community.

At the DA's provincial elective conference held at the Durban International Convention Centre on 29 April 2023, Meyer was elected as the first deputy provincial chairperson of the party. DA Member of Parliament Hannah Winkler and eThekwini councillor Hlengiwe Shozi were elected alongside him.

Following his re-election to the Provincial Legislature in the 2024 provincial election, Meyer was appointed as the Member of the Executive Council (MEC) for Public Works and Infrastructure by the newly elected premier from the Inkatha Freedom Party, Thami Ntuli, as part of the provincial coalition government agreement. He is the first openly LGBTIQ+ person to serve in the province's Executive Council.

In April 2026, Meyer announced that he would be contesting the deputy leader position at the DA's upcoming provincial conference which will be held on 9 May 2026.

== Personal life ==
Meyer is openly gay.
