= 2013 Pinetown crash =

Motor vehicle incident in South Africa

Coordinates: 29°48′41″S 30°50′59″E

Pinetown truck accident 2013

Details
- Date: 5 September 2013
- Location: Pinetown, South Africa

Statistics
- Deaths: 27
- Injured: At least 80

On September 5, 2013, an articulated truck drove through a red light at high speed, killing 26 people (later becoming 27) and injuring at least 80, in Pinetown, South Africa. After a light turned green at the junction of Richmond/Josiah Gumede Roads, several vehicles (including taxis full of home-bound commuters) began advancing and were struck side-on moments later by a truck careening down Field's Hill. The driver maintained that the brakes had failed as it descended the notorious hill approaching the intersection. The crash was filmed by the dashcam of a vehicle that had been waiting for the light to turn green. Another angle was also captured on a security camera.

== Aftermath ==
The incident provoked a statement from the acting President of South Africa, Jacob Zuma, who expressed grief and emphasized the need for mindfulness when driving: "The loss of such a high number of people, some of them breadwinners, is painful and has affected so many households negatively. We urge road users, especially drivers, to exercise caution on the roads especially when carrying passengers."

After the crash, it was reported that the truck's license had recently expired. Subsequently, the driver Sanele Goodness May, a 23-year-old citizen from Swaziland was taken to court under multiple charges including homicide and reckless driving. He pleaded guilty to all charges and was sentenced to eight years.

Local City Councillor Rick Crouch has been vocal about the Provincial Government's failure in stopping the carnage on Field's Hill, going as far as accusing the KwaZulu-Natal MEC for Transport, Community Safety and Liaison Willies Mchunu of practicing "tombstone legislation". Councillor Rick Crouch has been campaigning for stricter rules for trucks on Field's Hill.
