= Cyril Xaba =

South African politician (born 1967)

Mayor of eThekwini
- Incumbent
- Assumed office 10 July 2024
- Deputy: Zandile Myeni
- Preceded by: Mxolisi Kaunda

Member of the KwaZulu-Natal Executive Council for Agriculture and Rural Development
- In office 26 May 2014 – 6 June 2016
- Premier: Senzo Mchunu
- Preceded by: Meshack Radebe
- Succeeded by: Themba Mthembu
Legislative offices 1994–2024
Chairperson of the Joint Standing Committee on Defence
In office 25 July 2019 – 28 May 2024 Serving with Elleck Nchabeleng
Preceded by	Stan Motimele
Succeeded by	Malusi Gigaba
Chairperson of the Portfolio Committee on Defence and Military Veterans
In office 2 July 2019 – 28 May 2024
Preceded by	Stan Motimele
Succeeded by	Dakota Legoete
Member of the National Assembly
In office 22 May 2019 – 28 May 2024
Constituency	KwaZulu-Natal
Member of the KwaZulu-Natal Legislature
In office 21 May 2014 – 7 May 2019
In office 1994–2009

Personal details
- Born: Vusumuzi Cyril Xaba; 14 February 1967 (age 59) Clermont, Natal Province; South Africa
- Party: African National Congress
- Education: University of Natal; University of KwaZulu-Natal

Vusumuzi Cyril Xaba (born 14 February 1967) is a South African politician from KwaZulu-Natal. He has been the Mayor of eThekwini since July 2024. A member of the National Executive Committee of the African National Congress (ANC), he formerly served in the National Assembly of South Africa between July 2019 and May 2024.

Trained as a lawyer, Xaba began his political career in student politics at the University of Natal. He represented the ANC in the KwaZulu-Natal Legislature for three consecutive terms between 1994 and 2009, before taking a brief hiatus to serve as head of the KwaZulu-Natal Provincial Planning Commission and special adviser to the Premier of KwaZulu-Natal. He returned to the provincial legislature between 2014 and 2019, and he served in the Executive Council of KwaZulu-Natal from 2014 to 2016, appointed as Member of the Executive Council for Agriculture and Rural Development under Premier Senzo Mchunu.

He joined the National Assembly in the May 2019 general election and chaired the Portfolio Committee on Defence and Military Veterans during the Sixth Parliament. During this period, in December 2022, he was elected to the ANC National Executive Committee. Although he failed to win re-election to his parliamentary seat in the May 2024 general election, he became a local councillor in the eThekwini Metropolitan Municipality shortly after the election, and on 10 July 2024 he was elected to succeed Mxolisi Kaunda as the municipality's mayor.

== Early life and education ==
Born on 14 February 1967, Xaba was born and raised in Clermont in the former Natal Province. He was the second-born of five siblings. He attended Ziphathele High School in Clermont, where he was active in the local leadership of the anti-apartheid Natal Students Congress and Congress of South African Students.

After matriculating in 1986, he enrolled in a Bachelor of Arts at the University of Durban-Westville, majoring in law, but he dropped out for political reasons. Instead, he transferred to the University of Natal, where he completed a community service training certificate in 1988 and a Baccalaureus Procurationis in 1992. Thereafter he enrolled in a Bachelor of Laws at the same university.

He was active in the South African Students Congress as a student, and he was deputy president of the university's Black Students Society during his first year as a law student. In addition, he joined the African National Congress (ANC): between 1990 and 1993, he was regional deputy chairperson and then regional chairperson of the ANC Youth League's branch in Southern Natal, and in 1993 he was elected to the regional executive committee of the mainstream ANC in Southern Natal.

Xaba did not complete his Bachelor of Laws, dropping out when he became a full-time politician in 1994. However, while working as a politician, he completed a Master of Laws at the University of KwaZulu-Natal in 2014. He also studied towards, but did not complete, a diploma in economic principles at the University of London.

== KwaZulu-Natal Legislature: 1994–2019 ==
In South Africa's first post-apartheid elections in April 1994, Xaba was elected to represent the ANC as a member of the newly established KwaZulu-Natal Legislature. From 1994 to 1999, he was the ANC's spokesperson on education. Then, from 1999 to 2009, he held a series of committee chairmanships in the legislature, leading the public works portfolio committee, the finance committee, and an ad-hoc constitutional affairs committee tasked with drafting the provincial constitution. He also served a stint as the ANC's chief whip in the legislature.

During the same period, he rose in the ranks of the provincial ANC; he was regional secretary of the party's branch in Durban West from 1995 to 2001, deputy chairperson of its regional branch in eThekwini from 2002 to 2007, and an elected member of the party's Provincial Executive Committee from 2004 to 2012.

After the April 2009 general election, having served three consecutive terms in the legislature, Xaba took a hiatus from legislative politics to serve as special adviser to the Premier of KwaZulu-Natal. He held that position until 2014 under Premier Zweli Mkhize and his successor Senzo Mchunu. Simultaneously, from 2010 to 2014, he was chairperson of the KwaZulu-Natal Provincial Planning Commission.

In the May 2014 provincial election, Xaba was elected to return to the KwaZulu-Natal Legislature. Announcing his new Executive Council, Premier Mchunu appointed Xaba to replace Meshack Radebe as Member of the Executive Council (MEC) for Agriculture and Rural Development. He oversaw a foot-and-mouth disease prevention campaign in the province.

However, Premier Mchunu was unceremoniously ousted from the provincial leadership of the ANC in November 2015, losing an internal election to Sihle Zikalala, and in May 2016 the ANC removed Mchunu from the premier's office. On 6 June 2016, newly elected Premier Willies Mchunu sacked Xaba from the Executive Council, replacing him with Themba Mthembu; he was fired alongside three other MECs who had also been viewed as political allies of Senzo Mchunu.

Xaba served the rest of the legislative term as an ordinary Member of the Provincial Legislature. In June 2017 he attended a CR17 campaign event in Dambuza, fuelling rumors that he had joined Senzo Mchunu in supporting Cyril Ramaphosa's bid to be elected as ANC president.

== National Assembly: 2019–2024 ==
In the May 2019 general election, Xaba was elected to a seat in the National Assembly, the lower house of the South African Parliament; he represented the ANC in the assembly's KwaZulu-Natal caucus. In the aftermath of the election, the ANC announced that it would nominate him to chair the National Assembly's Portfolio Committee on Defence and Military Veterans. At the committee's first meeting on 2 July 2019, he was duly elected, unopposed, as chairperson. On 25 July 2019, he was additionally elected as co-chairperson of Parliament's Joint Standing Committee on Defence, serving alongside Elleck Nchabeleng of the National Council of Provinces. He held both positions during two major domestic deployments of the South African National Defence Force, first during the COVID-19 pandemic of 2020 and then during the civil unrest of 2021.

Alongside his defence portfolios, Xaba was a member of other high-profile portfolios. Between 2020 and 2021, he was a member of the ad hoc committee tasked with considering legislation to amend Section 25 of the Constitution to address land expropriation; he served as the ANC's whip in that committee. And in 2023 he was elected as chairperson of the ad hoc committee that selected Kholeka Gcaleka to succeed Busisiwe Mkhwebane as Public Protector. He also represented the National Assembly at the Judicial Service Commission.

Meanwhile, in December 2022, Xaba attended the ANC's 55th National Conference, which elected him to his first five-year term as a member of the party's National Executive Committee. He received 1,128 votes across roughly 4,000 ballots, making him the 50th-most popular member of the 80-member committee. At the new committee's first meeting in February 2023, he was appointed as chairperson of the committee's subcommittee on legal and constitutional affairs, with Faith Muthambi as his deputy. However, in September 2023, he was moved to a new portfolio, replacing Mdu Manana as chairperson of the party's National Dispute Resolution Committee; Justice Minister Ronald Lamola replaced him in his former subcommittee position.

In the May 2024 general election, Xaba stood for re-election to the National Assembly, now ranked 82nd on the ANC's national party list. Because of the ANC's poor electoral performance, he narrowly failed to win a seat.

== Mayor of eThekwini: 2024–present ==
In the aftermath of the May 2024 election, the incumbent Mayor of eThekwini, Mxolisi Kaunda, was asked by the ANC to resign his mayoral office in order to take up a parliamentary seat. Xaba, in turn, was sworn in to an ANC council seat in the eThekwini Metropolitan Municipality. He was immediately regarded as a possible candidate to succeed Kaunda, though there were reports that his ascension would face resistance both from inside the local ANC and from the ANC's coalition partners in the council, the Democratic Alliance and Inkatha Freedom Party. Nonetheless, on 10 July 2024, Xaba was elected unopposed as mayor of eThekwini.
