= Belinda Scott =

South African politician

Deputy Mayor of eThekwini
- In office 6 September 2019 – 28 February 2021
- Mayor: Mxolisi Kaunda
- Preceded by: Fawzia Peer

Member of the KwaZulu-Natal Executive Council for Finance
- In office May 2014 – May 2019
- Premier: Senzo Mchunu; Willies Mchunu
- Preceded by: Ina Cronje
- Succeeded by: Ravi Pillay

Personal details
- Born: 17 February 1964 (age 62)
- Citizenship: South Africa
- Party: African National Congress (since 2002); Democratic Party (1999–2002); Inkatha Freedom Party (until 1999)

Belinda Francis Scott (born 17 February 1964), formerly Belinda Barrett, is a South African politician who was KwaZulu-Natal's Member of the Executive Council (MEC) for Finance from 2014 to 2019. She served several terms in the KwaZulu-Natal Provincial Legislature from 1994 to 2019, representing the African National Congress (ANC) from 2002 onwards after defecting from both the Democratic Party and the Inkatha Freedom Party. After she left the provincial legislature in 2019, she served as Deputy Mayor of eThekwini from September 2019 until she resigned from politics in February 2021.

== KwaZulu-Natal Legislature: 1994–2019 ==
Born on 17 February 1964, Scott entered politics through Mangosuthu Buthelezi's Inkatha: in the 1980s, she was a researcher at the Inkatha Institute and then became a speechwriter for Buthelezi. Reportedly a close associate of Walter Felgate, she stood as a candidate in the 1994 general election, South Africa's first after apartheid, on the party list for Inkatha, by then renamed the Inkatha Freedom Party (IFP).

In 1999, she defected to the Democratic Party (DP), saying that she was "disillusioned with corruption in Inkatha". She remained in the provincial legislature and became the only female member of the DP's 15-member federal executive committee. By 2002, Scott was the DP's Chief Whip in the provincial legislature. In June of that year, during the legislature's floor-crossing period, she defected from the DP to the African National Congress (ANC).

Scott continued to represent the ANC. She was elected to her final term in the provincial legislature in the 2014 general election, ranked 22nd on the ANC's provincial party list. After the election, Premier Senzo Mchunu appointed her to the KwaZulu-Natal Executive Council as Member of the Executive Council (MEC) for Finance. She retained that portfolio until the next general election in 2019, when she did not stand for re-election and resigned from the provincial legislature.

== Deputy Mayor of eThekwini: 2019–2021 ==
Her resignation from the provincial legislature notwithstanding, Scott was appointed to a new position later in 2019 when, in August, the provincial ANC announced that she would be nominated as the party's candidate to serve as Deputy Mayor of eThekwini. She was officially elected to the position on 5 September 2019. She was sent to the eThekwini council as part of a corps of cadres – also including new Mayor Mxolisi Kaunda, new Speaker Weziwe Thusi, and new Chief Whip Sibongiseni Mkhize – that the ANC said would help improve service delivery in the province after the former mayor, Zandile Gumede, had been judged by the party to be unfit for office.

On 17 February 2021, after prior unconfirmed reports to the same effect, Scott announced that she would resign from the council in order to pursue a PhD and a career in the private sector. She joined the private sector in March.
