= Lydia Johnson =

South African politician

Member of the KwaZulu-Natal Legislature
- In office until 7 May 2019

Speaker of the KwaZulu-Natal Legislature
- In office 8 October 2013 – 7 May 2019
- Preceded by: Peggy Nkonyeni
- Succeeded by: Ntobeko Boyce

Member of the KwaZulu-Natal Executive Council for Agriculture, Environmental Affairs and Rural Development
- In office May 2009 – November 2011
- Premier: Zweli Mkhize
- Preceded by: Mtholephi Mthimkhulu
- Succeeded by: Meshack Radebe

Member of the KwaZulu-Natal Executive Council for Public Works
- In office November 2006 – May 2009
- Premier: S'bu Ndebele
- Preceded by: Blessed Gwala
- Succeeded by: Maggie Govender

Personal details
- Citizenship: South African
- Party: African National Congress

Lydia Johnson is a South African politician who represented the African National Congress (ANC) in the KwaZulu-Natal Legislature until 2019. She was the legislature's Speaker from 2013 to 2019 and previously served in the KwaZulu-Natal Executive Council between 2006 and 2011: she was KwaZulu-Natal's Member of the Executive Council (MEC) for Public Works from 2006 to 2009 and MEC for Agriculture, Environmental Affairs and Rural Development from 2009 to 2011. In June 2022, she was appointed board chairperson at Ezemvelo.

== Political career ==
Johnson was a long-serving representative of the ANC in the KwaZulu-Natal Legislature. In November 2006, she was appointed to the KwaZulu-Natal Executive Council by Premier S'bu Ndebele; she succeeded Blessed Gwala of the Inkatha Freedom Party as MEC for Public Works. She held that office until the 2009 general election, in which she was re-elected to her legislative seat, ranked sixth on the ANC's provincial party list. After the election, she was reappointed to the Executive Council as MEC for Agriculture, Environmental Affairs and Rural Development under newly elected Premier Zweli Mkhize, succeeding Mtholephi Mthimkhulu. However, Mkhize fired her from the Executive Council in a reshuffle in November 2011.

Johnson subsequently served a stint as Chairperson of Committees in the provincial legislature. She left that office on 8 October 2013, when she was elected as Speaker in the legislature, succeeding Peggy Nkonyeni, who had been appointed to the Executive Council. In the 2014 general election, she was re-elected to her legislative seat, ranked 16th on the ANC's party list, she continued to serve as Speaker until the 2019 general election. She was also a member of the Provincial Executive Committee of the ANC's KwaZulu-Natal branch for at least two terms, gaining election in 2012 and 2015.

In 2019, she did not seek re-election to the provincial legislature, and she was succeeded as Speaker by Ntobeko Boyce. In June 2022, Ravi Pillay, the incumbent MEC for Economic Development, Tourism and Environmental Affairs, announced that Johnson had been appointed to chair the board of Ezemvelo.
