= Hlengiwe Mavimbela =

South African politician

Hlengiwe Mavimbela MPL

KwaZulu-Natal MEC for Sports, Recreation, Arts and Culture
- In office 27 May 2019 – 11 August 2022
- Premier: Sihle Zikalala
- Preceded by: Bongi Sithole-Moloi
- Succeeded by: Amanda Mapena

Member of the KwaZulu-Natal Legislature
- Incumbent
- Assumed office 22 May 2019

Personal details
- Born: Hlengiwe Goodness Slindile Mavimbela
- Party: African National Congress
- Occupation: Member of the Executive Council
- Profession: Teacher; Politician

Hlengiwe Goodness Slindile Mavimbela is a South African politician and teacher who served as the Member of the Executive Council (MEC) for Sports, Recreation, Arts and Culture in the KwaZulu-Natal provincial government from May 2019 to August 2022. She was elected to the legislature in May 2019. Mavimbela is a member of the African National Congress.

== Background ==
Mavimbela is from Umkhanyakude in northern KwaZulu-Natal. She is a teacher by profession. She is a member of the African National Congress. Mavimbela was the speaker of Umkhanyakude District Municipality during the mayoralty of Jeff Vilane.

== Provincial government ==
She was sworn in as a Member of the KwaZulu-Natal Legislature on 22 May 2019. On 28 May, premier Sihle Zikalala appointed Mavimbela as the Member of the Executive Council (MEC) for Sports, Recreation, Arts and Culture. She succeeded Bongi Sithole-Moloi and took office on the same day.

On 11 August 2022, Mavimbela resigned as MEC ahead of the newly elected premier Nomusa Dube-Ncube's cabinet announcement.
