= Ntombikayise Sibhidla-Saphetha =

South African politician

Ntombikayise Sibhidla-Saphetha MPL

Member of the KwaZulu-Natal Provincial Legislature
- Incumbent
- Assumed office 2011

Member of the KwaZulu-Natal Executive Council for Arts, Culture, Sports and Recreation
- In office November 2011 – May 2016
- Premier: Zweli Mkhize; Senzo Mchunu; Willies Mchunu
- Preceded by: Weziwe Thusi
- Succeeded by: Bongi Sithole-Moloi

Member of the National Assembly
- In office 2007–2011

Personal details
- Born: 16 June 1974 (age 52) Clermont, Natal; South Africa
- Party: African National Congress
- Spouse: Zola Saphetha
- Nickname: Ntombi

Ntombikayise Nomawisile Sibhidla-Saphetha (born 16 June 1974) is a South African politician who has represented the African National Congress (ANC) in the KwaZulu-Natal Provincial Legislature since 2011. She was formerly KwaZulu-Natal's Member of the Executive Council (MEC) for Arts, Culture, Sports and Recreation from November 2011 to May 2016, and before that she represented the ANC in the National Assembly from 2007 to 2011.

== Early life and career ==
Sibhidla-Saphetha was born on 16 June 1974 in Clermont in Durban in present-day KwaZulu-Natal, then known as Natal province. Her father was Jimmy Mtolo, a regional leader of the South African National Civics Organisation who was assassinated in 2008. She has a diploma in electrical engineering and entered politics through the ANC Youth League, rising through the league's ranks from the leadership of the Clermont local branch to the deputy chair of the Durban West regional branch. She was co-opted onto the Provincial Executive Committee and then the National Executive Committee of the league, before she was elected to the Provincial Executive Committee of the mainstream ANC's KwaZulu-Natal branch in 2008.

== Legislative career ==
On 12 September 2007, Sibhidla-Saphetha was sworn in to the National Assembly, filling the casual vacancy created by Yusuf Bhamjee's resignation. She was elected to a full term in the assembly in the 2009 general election and held the seat until November 2011, when she was appointed to the KwaZulu-Natal Executive Council in a cabinet reshuffle by Premier Zweli Mkhize; she was sworn into the KwaZulu-Natal Provincial Legislature to take up office as MEC for Arts, Culture, Sports and Recreation. At that time she was the youngest MEC in the province. She was retained in that position throughout the rest of Mkhize's tenure and that of his successor Senzo Mchunu; she secured election to her first full term in the provincial legislature in the 2014 general election, ranked tenth on the ANC's provincial party list. However, in May 2016, she was fired from the Executive Council in a reshuffle by Willies Mchunu, who had recently replaced Senzo Mchunu as Premier.

After her dismissal from the Executive Council, Sibhidla-Saphetha remained an ordinary Member of the Provincial Legislature; she was re-elected to her legislative seat in the 2019 general election, ranked fifth on the ANC's party list.

== Personal life ==
As of 2011, Sibhidla-Saphetha was married and had two children. Her husband is trade unionist Zola Saphetha.
