= Peggy Nkonyeni =

South African politician

KwaZulu-Natal MEC for Finance
- In office 11 August 2022 – 14 June 2024
- Premier: Nomusa Dube-Ncube
- Preceded by: Nomusa Dube-Ncube
- Succeeded by: Francois Rodgers

KwaZulu-Natal MEC for Transport, Community Safety and Liaison
- In office 9 March 2021 – 11 August 2022
- Premier: Sihle Zikalala
- Preceded by: Bheki Ntuli
- Succeeded by: Sipho Hlomuka

KwaZulu-Natal MEC for Human Settlements and Public Works
- In office 27 May 2019 – 9 March 2021
- Premier: Sihle Zikalala
- Preceded by: Ravi Pillay
- Succeeded by: Jomo Sibiya

Member of the National Assembly of South Africa
- In office 27 February 2018 – 7 May 2019
- Preceded by: Beatrice Ngcobo

KwaZulu-Natal MEC for Education
- In office 7 October 2013 – 6 June 2016
- Premier: Senzo Mchunu
- Preceded by: Senzo Mchunu
- Succeeded by: Mthandeni Dlungwane

Speaker of the KwaZulu-Natal Legislature
- In office 6 May 2009 – 7 October 2013
- Preceded by: Willies Mchunu
- Succeeded by: Lydia Johnson

KwaZulu-Natal MEC for Health
- In office 2004–2009
- Premier: S'bu Ndebele
- Preceded by: Zweli Mkhize
- Succeeded by: Sibongiseni Dhlomo

Personal details
- Born: Neliswa Peggy Nkonyeni; 8 September 1961 (age 64) Oshabeni, Port Shepstone, South Africa
- Party: African National Congress; South African Communist Party

Neliswa Peggy Nkonyeni (born 8 September 1961) is a South African politician and educator. A member of the African National Congress, she was the Member of the Executive Council (MEC) for Finance in KwaZulu-Natal from August 2022 until June 2024.

In November 2004, she was appointed as the MEC for Health. Nkonyeni was elected as the speaker of the legislature after the 2009 general election. In 2013, Nkonyeni was made MEC for Education, a position she held until she was demoted from the executive council in 2016. She was sworn in as a member of the National Assembly of South Africa, the lower house of parliament, in February 2018. Following the 2019 general election, Nkonyeni returned to the KwaZulu-Natal legislature and was appointed MEC for Human Settlements and Public Works. In March 2021, she was appointed MEC for Transport, Community Safety and Liaison.

== Early life and career ==
Nkonyeni was born on 8 September 1961 in Oshabeni outside Port Shepstone in the Natal Province. She trained to be a secondary school teacher and taught from 1989 to 1999.

== Political career ==
A member of the African National Congress (ANC) and the South African Communist Party, Nkonyeni was elected to the KwaZulu-Natal Legislature in the 1999 general election as an ANC representative. From 1999 to 2004, she served as an ANC whip and chairperson of the Parliamentary Women's Caucus. Before her appointment to the Executive Council, she was chairperson of committees in the legislature.

In November 2004, premier S'bu Ndebele reshuffled his Executive Council and appointed Nkonyeni as the MEC responsible for the provincial Department of Health. Her tenure as Health MEC was controversial. Nkonyeni was seen as a HIV/AIDS denialist. She denounced the World Health Organization (WHO) for not providing "a clear message on the role of nutrition in delaying the progression of HIV to AIDS" in 2005. Nkonyeni also claimed that zidovudine (AZT), a medication for preventing and treating HIV/AIDS, was "toxic" and that antiretroviral medication had severe side effects. She promoted Ubhejane, an untested, expensive traditional herbal medicine used by many to treat HIV/AIDS. In December 2008, Nkonyeni and five others were arrested by the Scorpions and charged with corruption, fraud and racketeering involving the unneeded purchase of equipment at inflated prices. The charges against her were later dropped.

After the 2009 general election, Nkonyeni was elected as the speaker of the provincial legislature. She held this position until October 2013, when she was made the MEC for Education. She took over from Senzo Mchunu, who was elected premier. After the 2014 general election, Nkonyeni remained in her position as MEC for Education. In 2016, Willies Mchunu took over as premier and Nkonyeni was recalled as an MEC. Mthandeni Dlungwane replaced her as Education MEC.

On 27 February 2018, she was sworn in as a Member of the National Assembly of South Africa for the ANC, replacing the late Beatrice Ngcobo. She returned to the provincial legislature after the 2019 general election and was appointed MEC for Human Settlements and Public Works by the newly elected premier, Sihle Zikalala.

On 9 March 2021, Nkonyeni was appointed MEC for Transport, Community Safety and Liaison, replacing the late Bheki Ntuli, as part of a mini reshuffle done by Zikalala.

On 11 August 2022, Nkonyeni was named MEC for Finance by the newly elected premier Nomusa Dube-Ncube.
