= Siboniso Duma =

South African politician (born 1975)

Siboniso Duma MPL

Member of the KwaZulu-Natal Executive Council for Transport and Human Settlements
- Incumbent
- Assumed office 18 June 2024
- Premier: Thami Ntuli
- Preceded by: Office established

Member of the KwaZulu-Natal Executive Council for Economic Development, Tourism and Environmental Affairs
- In office 11 August 2022 – 14 June 2024
- Premier: Nomusa Dube-Ncube
- Preceded by: Ravi Pillay
- Succeeded by: Musa Zondi

Provincial Chairperson of the African National Congress in KwaZulu-Natal
- Incumbent
- Assumed office 23 July 2022
- Deputy: Nomagugu Simelane-Zulu
- Preceded by: Sihle Zikalala

Member of the KwaZulu-Natal Legislature
- Incumbent
- Assumed office 21 May 2014

Personal details
- Born: Siboniso Armstrong Duma; 13 December 1975 (age 50) Mthwalume, Ugu District Municipality, KwaZulu Natal, South Africa
- Party: African National Congress

Siboniso Armstrong Duma (born 13 December 1975) is a South African politician who is the provincial chairperson of the African National Congress (ANC) in KwaZulu-Natal. He is also Member of the Executive Council (MEC) for Transport and Human Settlements in the KwaZulu-Natal government.

Duma rose to political prominence in the ANC Youth League of KwaZulu-Natal. He has served in the KwaZulu-Natal Provincial Legislature since 2014 and was the legislature's Chair of Chairs until shortly after his election as ANC provincial chairperson in mid-2022, when he was appointed to the Executive Council of newly elected Premier Nomusa Dube-Ncube.

== Early life ==
Duma grew up in Mtwalume on the South Coast of what is now KwaZulu-Natal province. His mother was a domestic worker and his father, a construction worker in Durban, died when he was a child. He is one of four siblings. He became politically active while at the University of KwaZulu-Natal, where he joined the African National Congress (ANC) Youth League (ANCYL).

== Early political career ==
Duma was the deputy chairperson of the ANC's George Mbhele local branch on the Lower South Coast between 2004 and 2006.

In May 2010, he was elected deputy provincial secretary of the ANCYL's KwaZulu-Natal branch. Shortly after being elected, the branch's leadership announced that it would support controversial politician Julius Malema in his bid for re-election as national president of the league. However, according to the Daily Maverick, the KwaZulu-Natal ANCYL leadership fell out with the Malema-led national ANCYL leadership when the latter, but not the former, retracted its support for incumbent ANC president Jacob Zuma. In October 2011, at a meeting between the national and provincial ANCYL leaders, Duma alleged that the national leadership was "factionalist" and was targeting the KwaZulu-Natal ANCYL because of its support for Zuma.

The following week, the ANCYL national leadership announced that it had disbanded the leadership committee of the KwaZulu-Natal ANCYL, prematurely ending the terms of Duma and other officials. ANCYL spokesperson Floyd Shivambu specifically singled out Duma's "factionalist" comment as an instance in which the KwaZulu-Natal leadership had shown "disregard of organisational process and due political conduct". Shivambu also said that the national ANCYL planned to charge Duma and others for "active involvement in mobilising members... to defy and disregard the decisions" of the Malema-led national leadership.

== Provincial government ==
In the 2014 general election, Duma was elected to the KwaZulu-Natal Provincial Legislature as an ANC representative. He was re-elected to another term in the provincial legislature in 2019. In June 2019, he was appointed Chair of Committees ("Chair of Chairs") in the legislature.

=== ANC Provincial Chairperson ===
By 2022, Duma was a member of the Provincial Executive Committee of the ANC's KwaZulu-Natal provincial branch. In May of that year, he emerged as a possible candidate for provincial chairperson of the ANC in KwaZulu-Natal. At that time, the frontrunners for the chairmanship appeared to be Nomusa Dube-Ncube and the incumbent, Sihle Zikalala. However, Duma was nominated for the position by the ANC's John Mchunu local branch in eThekwini and received the support of the eThekwini regional branch. He campaigned at the head of a slate of candidates who represented the so-called "Taliban" faction, which was sympathetic to former party president Jacob Zuma. Duma later explained that the name alluded to his slate's status as "underdogs" and to "the resilience of the Taliban in fighting against the United States all these years".

At the ANC's provincial conference on 23 July 2022, Duma comfortably defeated Zikalala in the election for provincial chairperson, winning 930 votes to Zikalala's 665. Candidates linked to the Taliban faction made a clean sweep of all the provincial leadership positions contested at the conference. Duma's election was described as a "big blow" to the re-election campaign of current party president Cyril Ramaphosa ahead of the party's 55th National Conference in December 2022.

=== Member of the Executive Council ===
After his election, Duma said that he did not intend to use his victory to remove Zikalala from the office of the Premier of KwaZulu-Natal. Nonetheless, on 5 August 2022, Zikalala resigned as premier and was replaced by Nomusa Dube-Ncube. On 11 August, in a cabinet reshuffle by Dube-Ncube, Duma was appointed as the Member of the Executive Council (MEC) for Economic Development, Tourism and Environmental Affairs in the KwaZulu-Natal provincial government.

In November 2023, Duma was criticised by the African National Congress Women's League for grabbing and lifting the Webb Ellis Cup during the Springboks' celebration tour in Durban following their victory at the 2023 Rugby World Cup and accused of undermining the authority of premier Dube-Ncube.

In the 2024 provincial election, the ANC's support in the province was diminished significantly due to former ANC president Jacob Zuma's uMkhonto weSizwe party. The ANC subsequently formed part of a coalition with the Inkatha Freedom Party, the Democratic Alliance and the National Freedom Party which saw Thami Ntuli of the IFP becoming premier. Duma was appointed MEC for Transport and Human Settlements by Ntuli.

== Personal life ==
Duma is married and has four children. He is Christian.
