= Delangokubona SA Business Forum =

Powerful criminal organisation in South Africa

Delangokubona Bussines Forum
- Territory: South Africa
- Activities: extortion, corruption, armed intimidation, bid rigging

The Durban based Delangokubona Business Forum, sometimes known as amaDelangokubona, claims to be a legitimate business association but is widely described as a 'mafia'.

It's tactics have included armed disruptions of construction sites and threats accompanied by demands for a percentage of contacts and armed demands that certain businesses not operate in certain areas.

Delangokubona has been connected to and strongly supportive of former South African President Jacob Zuma and former Durban Mayor Zandile Gumede, both of whom have been investigated for large scale corruption.

President Cyril Ramaphosa has condemned the organisation for engaging in 'robbery' and called for a law enforcement crackdown.
