= Sipho Nkosi =

South African politician

Member of the Executive Council of KwaZulu-Natal for Human Settlements and Public Works
- In office 23 May 2023 – 14 June 2024
- Premier: Nomusa Dube-Ncube
- Preceded by: Ntuthuko Mahlaba
- Succeeded by: Office abolished

Member of the KwaZulu-Natal Provincial Legislature
- In office 6 May 2009 – 28 May 2024

Personal details
- Citizenship: South Africa
- Party: African National Congress
- Nickname: KK

Sipho Caiphas "KK" Nkosi is a South African politician who represented the African National Congress (ANC) in the KwaZulu-Natal Provincial Legislature from 2009 until 2024. He became the chairperson legislature's Portfolio Committee on Finance in 2014. On 23 May 2023, he was appointed the Member of the Executive Council responsible for Human Settlements and Public Works.

== Political career ==
Nkosi previously served as provincial secretary of the South African Democratic Teachers' Union in KwaZulu-Natal. He was first elected to the provincial legislature in the 2009 general election, ranked 27th on the ANC's provincial party list.

He was re-elected to his seat in the 2014 general election, ranked 11th on the ANC's party list, and he was subsequently elected to chair the legislature's Portfolio Committee on Finance; his appointment was welcomed by the opposition Democratic Alliance. In the 2019 general election, he was elected to his third term in the provincial legislature, ranked 29th on the ANC's party list. He retained his position as chair of the finance committee.

Nkosi was appointed the Member of the Executive Council responsible for Human Settlements and Public Works on 23 May 2023. Nkosi left the provincial legislature and the provincial government at the 2024 provincial election.
