= Oshabeni =

Settlement in KwaZulu-Natal, South Africa

Oshabeni Oshabeni Watersheds, Mgolemi
- Location within KwaZulu-Natal Location within South Africa
- Coordinates: 30°36′53″S 30°21′31″E
- Country: South Africa
- Province: KwaZulu-Natal
- District: Ugu
- Municipality: Ray Nkonyeni

Area
  - Total: 11.59 km^{2} (4.47 sq mi)

Population (2011)
  - Total: 9,808
  - Density: 846.2/km^{2} (2,192/sq mi)

Racial makeup (2011)
  - Black African: 99.7%
  - Indian/Asian: 0.12%
  - White: 0.08%
  - Coloured: 0.07%
  - Other: 0.02%

First languages (2011)
  - Zulu: 95.4%
  - English: 1.42%
  - Ndebele: 1.1%
  - Xhosa: 0.7%
  - Other: 1.38%
- Time zone: UTC+2 (SAST)
- PO box: 4246

Oshabeni, also known as Oshabeni Watersheds, is a rural settlement situated on the South Coast of KwaZulu-Natal, South Africa, approximately 22 kilometres (13.67 mi) north-west of Port Shepstone and 25 kilometres (15.53) south-east of St Faith’s.

Geographically, it lies on the watershed between the uMzimkhulu River to the south and the uMtentweni River to the north.

== Governance ==
Oshabeni is governed by the Ray Nkonyeni Local Municipality, which forms part of the larger Ugu District Municipality. Traditionally, it governed by the Zulu Tribal authority under the leadership of Inkosi Sithembiso kaZiwengu Lushaba.

== Education ==
There are two high schools within the area including Malusi High School and . Other educational institutions include ECD institutions, three primary schools, and a Tvet college.

== Economy ==
There are two companies located south of Oshabeni that conduct mining operations which create job opportunities for local residents. South of the uMzimkhulu River is the Simuma Quarry operated by Natal Portland Cement (NPC) while to the north of the river is the Oshabeni Quarry operated by Rosican.

== Transport ==
Oshabeni lies along the P68 (St Faith’s Road) which connects the area with St Faith’s to the north-west and with Umtentweni (north of Port Shepstone) to the south-east.
