= Mntomuhle Khawula =

South African politician (born 1960)

Mntomuhle Khawula MPL

Member of the KwaZulu-Natal Executive Council for Sports, Arts and Culture
- Incumbent
- Assumed office 23 June 2024
- Premier: Thami Ntuli
- Preceded by: Ntuthuko Mahlaba

Permanent Delegate to the National Council of Provinces

Assembly Member for KwaZulu-Natal
- In office 22 May 2014 – 7 May 2019

Personal details
- Born: 28 April 1962 (age 64)
- Party: Inkatha Freedom Party

Mntomuhle Khawula (born 28 April 1962) is a South African politician from KwaZulu-Natal. A member of the Inkatha Freedom Party (IFP), he is Member of the Executive Council (MEC) for Sports, Arts, and Culture in KwaZulu-Natal.

== Life and career ==
Khawula was born on 28 April 1962. He was formerly the national leader of the IFP Youth Brigade and the mayor of Ugu District Municipality in KwaZulu-Natal.

After that, he was elected to represent the IFP in the KwaZulu-Natal Legislature for two consecutive terms, gaining election in April 2009 and May 2014. For part of that period, he served as the IFP's provincial chairperson in KwaZulu-Natal.

During the Fifth Parliament between May 2014 and May 2019, Khawula left the province to serve in the National Council of Provinces, the upper house of the Parliament of South Africa. He was the IFP's only representative in the upper house during that parliamentary term.

He returned to the provincial legislature in the May 2019 general election. He was re-elected, ranked eighth on the IFP's provincial party list, in the May 2024 general election, after which the IFP formed a coalition government. Announcing his coalition Executive Council on 18 June 2024, newly elected Premier Thami Ntuli named Khawula as Member of the Executive Council (MEC) for Sports, Arts and Culture. Khawula said that he would aim to improve on the work of national ministers of sports, arts, and culture like Fikile Mbalula and Nathi Mthethwa, who he said had treated the portfolio as "a Cinderella department where most things are not taken as seriously as they should".

In May 2026, Khawula represented the IFP at a political debate about immigration and xenophobia, against the backdrop of anti-immigration protests by Operation Dudula and March and March. He spoke in favor of deportation of undocumented immigrants but said that the IFP opposed vigilantism, violence, and lawlessness.
