= Lindiwe Bebee =

South African politician

Lindiwe Bebee MP

Permanent delegate to the National Council of Provinces from KwaZulu-Natal
- Incumbent
- Assumed office 23 May 2019

Member of the KwaZulu-Natal Legislature
- In office 6 May 2009 – 7 May 2019

Personal details
- Born: Lindiwe Christabola Bebee
- Party: African National Congress
- Occupation: Member of Parliament
- Profession: Politician

Lindiwe Christabola Bebee is a South African politician. She has been serving as a permanent delegate to the National Council of Provinces since May 2019. A member of the African National Congress, she is the whip of the KwaZulu-Natal provincial delegation. From May 2009 to May 2019, Bebee served as a Member of the KwaZulu-Natal Legislature.

== Political career ==
From 2009 to 2019, Bebee served as a Member of the KwaZulu-Natal Legislature for the African National Congress.

== Parliamentary career ==
Bebee was elected to the National Council of Provinces following the 8 May 2019 general election. She was sworn in as an MP on 23 May 2019. Bebee was appointed whip of the KwaZulu-Natal provincial delegation. On 24 June, she was given her committee assignments. She was appointed to the Joint Standing Committee on Intelligence in November 2019.

=== Committee assignments ===
- Joint Standing Committee on Intelligence
- Select Committee on Appropriations
- Select Committee on Cooperative Governance and Traditional Affairs, Water and Sanitation and Human Settlements
- Select Committee on Finance
- Select Committee on Land Reform, Environment, Mineral Resources and Energy
- Select Committee on Petitions and Executive Undertakings
- Select Committee on Public Enterprises and Communication
- Select Committee on Security and Justice
