= Jomo Sibiya =

South African politician

The Honourable Jomo Sibiya MPL

Deputy Minister of Employment and Labour
- Incumbent
- Assumed office 3 July 2024 Serving with Judith Tshabalala
- President: Cyril Ramaphosa
- Preceded by: Phumzile Mgcina

KwaZulu-Natal MEC for Human Settlements and Public Works
- In office 9 March 2021 – 11 August 2022
- Premier: Sihle Zikalala
- Preceded by: Peggy Nkonyeni
- Succeeded by: Ntuthuko Mahlaba

Member of the KwaZulu-Natal Legislature
- Incumbent
- Assumed office 21 May 2014

Personal details
- Born: Ntuthuko Mbongiseni Sibiya Silutshana, Nquthu, South Africa
- Party: African National Congress
- Spouse: Simphiwe Msimango
- Children: 2
- Education: University of KwaZulu-Natal

Ntuthuko Mbongiseni Sibiya, known as Jomo Sibiya, is a South African politician who served as the Member of the Executive Council (MEC) for Human Settlements and Public Works in KwaZulu-Natal from March 2021 until August 2022. A member of the African National Congress, Sibiya was elected to the KwaZulu-Natal Legislature in 2014. He is the deputy Minister for Employment and Labour in the Cabinet of South Africa, serving since 3 July 2024.

== Early life and education ==
Sibiya was born in Silutshana, Nquthu in South Africa's former Natal Province. He matriculated from Ekucabangeni High School. Sibiya went on to study at the University of KwaZulu-Natal's Westville campus and graduated from the university with a degree in political science in 2008.

== Political career ==
While a student at the University of KwaZulu-Natal, Sibiya became involved in politics. He was the chairperson of the African National Congress (ANC) Youth League's branch at the Westville campus. After he left university, Sibiya was elected secretary of the ANC's Ward 24 branch in eThekwini. He later became chairperson of the branch. Sibiya served as chairperson of the ANC Youth League in eThekwini between 2011 and 2013. He was elected to the Regional Executive Committee of the ANC in eThekwini in 2012 and later became a member of the party's Regional Working Committee. In 2014, Sibiya moved back to Nquthu and was elected to serve on the regional executive committee of the ANC's iNkosi Bhambatha Region. He had also worked for the provincial department of cooperative governance and traditional affairs.

In 2014, Sibiya was elected to the KwaZulu-Natal Legislature via the ANC's provincial electoral list. He served on multiple committees, including the Human Settlements Portfolio Committee. He was elected to the ANC's provincial executive committee in 2018. Following the 2019 general elections, Sibiya was elected chairperson of the Education Portfolio Committee.

In March 2021, premier Sihle Zikalala conducted a reshuffle of his provincial Executive Council following the death of MEC Bheki Ntuli in January 2021. Sibiya was appointed as the MEC for Human Settlements and Public Works, taking over from Peggy Nkonyeni, who was moved to the Transport, Community Safety and Liaison portfolio.

In July 2022, the ANC's Inkosi Bhambatha region nominated Sibiya to contest the position of provincial treasurer at the ANC's provincial elective conference. At the provincial conference on 23 July 2022, Sibiya was nominated from the floor and accepted the nomination for provincial treasurer. He competed against former Newcastle mayor Dr Ntuthuko Mahlaba, who was also nominated from the floor. Sibiya lost to Mahlaba.

On 5 August 2022, Zikalala resigned as premier. Finance MEC Nomusa Dube-Ncube was elected as the new premier on 10 August. He resigned as MEC for Human Settlements and Public Works in anticipation of Dube-Ncube's cabinet announcement on 11 August 2022.

== Personal life ==
Sibiya is married to Simphiwe Msimango. They have children together.
