= Linda Hlongwa-Madlala =

South African politician

Linda Hlongwa-Madlala MPL

Member of the KwaZulu-Natal Provincial Legislature
- Incumbent
- Assumed office 2005

Personal details
- Citizenship: South Africa
- Party: ANC (since 2007); Nadeco (2005–2007)
- Spouse: Cyril Madlala

Linda Xolelwa Hlobisile Hlongwa-Madlala is a South African politician who has served in the KwaZulu-Natal Provincial Legislature since 2005. She was a member of the National Democratic Convention until 15 September 2007, when she defected to the African National Congress (ANC) during the legislature's floor-crossing period. Since then she has represented the ANC in the legislature; most recently, she was re-elected to her seat in the 2014 general election, ranked 36th on the ANC's provincial party list, and in the 2019 general election, ranked 37th. She is married to Cyril Madlala, a journalist and formerly a spin doctor for the provincial government.
