= Ina Cronjé =

South African politician (1943–2023)

Member of the KwaZulu-Natal Legislature
- In office 1994 – May 2014

Member of the KwaZulu-Natal Executive Council for Finance
- In office May 2009 – May 2014
- Premier: Zweli Mkhize; Senzo Mchunu
- Succeeded by: Belinda Scott

Member of the KwaZulu-Natal Executive Council for Education
- In office 2004 – May 2009
- Premier: S'bu Ndebele
- Succeeded by: Senzo Mchunu

Personal details
- Born: Catharina Magdalena Cronjé; 29 October 1943 Pretoria, South Africa
- Died: 24 October 2023 (aged 79) Hilton, South Africa
- Party: African National Congress
- Spouse: Pierre
- Children: 2
- Education: University of Pretoria; University of Natal; University of South Africa

Catharina Magdalena "Ina" Cronjé (29 October 1943 – 24 October 2023) was a South African politician who served in the Executive Council of KwaZulu-Natal from 2004 to 2014. She was KwaZulu-Natal's Member of the Executive Council (MEC) for Education from 2004 to 2009, and MEC for Finance from 2009 to 2014.

A lawyer by training and a former teacher, she represented the African National Congress (ANC) in the KwaZulu-Natal Provincial Legislature from 1994 until she retired from politics in 2014, and she was the Chief Whip in the legislature from 1995 to 2004. She was also a former member of the Provincial Executive Committee of the ANC's branch in KwaZulu-Natal.

== Early life and career ==
Catharina Magdalena Cronjé was born on 29 October 1943 in Pretoria, but she grew up in Schweizer-Reneke in the former Transvaal (now part of North West province). She had four sisters. In 1964, she graduated from the University of Pretoria with a Bachelor's degree in German, Afrikaans, and art history.

Cronjé taught at schools in Johannesburg and Pretoria before moving to Phalaborwa in present-day Limpopo, where she enrolled in a correspondence journalism course and worked for a local newspaper. In 1968, she returned to teaching in the Natal province (present-day KwaZulu-Natal), with posts at Amanzimtoti's Kingsway High School, at Pietermaritzburg Girls' High, and at St. Anne's Diocesan College.

After her son was born, Cronjé retired from teaching to study law full-time through the University of South Africa. She was admitted as an attorney in the late 1980s and practised in Pietermaritzburg. In the early 1990s, she became increasingly active in the ANC, defending ANC members in political trials and becoming a founding member of the ANC's Pietermaritzburg Central branch.

== Political career ==
In 1994, she left legal practice when she was elected to an ANC seat in the KwaZulu-Natal Provincial Legislature. She was also appointed Deputy Chief Whip of the Majority Party in the legislature, deputising Harry Gwala. When Gwala died in 1995, she took over as Chief Whip, a position which she held until the 2004 general election. From 2004 until 2009, she served in the KwaZulu-Natal Executive Council as MEC for Education.

In the 2009 general election, Cronjé was re-elected to the provincial legislature and was additionally appointed MEC for Finance by Premier Zweli Mkhize. She was initially retained in this portfolio by Mkhize's successor, Senzo Mchunu, who took office in 2013. She was also re-elected to her legislative seat in the 2014 general election, ranked third on the ANC's provincial party list. However, after the election, Mchunu did not reappoint Cronjé to the Executive Council; she was replaced as Finance MEC by Belinda Scott. Shortly afterwards, Cronjé announced that she would also resign as an ordinary Member of the Provincial Legislature, "for personal reasons". At that time, she was in her 70s.

== Later career ==
Cronjé went back into legal practice after completing a 20-year tenure in the KZN legislature. In 2018, Cronjé obtained a Master of Laws degree in environmental law, at the University of KwaZulu-Natal. She was appointed the chair of the Trade & Investment KZN board in December 2014 and chaired a board meeting less than three weeks before her death.

== Personal life ==
Cronjé was married to Pierre; they had two children.

Cronjé died at her home in Hilton on 24 October 2023, five days before her 80th birthday.
