= Weziwe Thusi =

South African politician (born 1951 or 1952)

Member of the KwaZulu-Natal Executive Council for Social Development
- In office November 2011 – May 2019
- Premier: Zweli Mkhize; Senzo Mchunu; Willies Mchunu
- Preceded by: Meshack Radebe
- Succeeded by: Nonhlanhla Khoza

Member of the KwaZulu-Natal Executive Council for Arts, Culture, Sports and Recreation
- In office May 2009 – November 2011
- Premier: Zweli Mkhize
- Preceded by: Herself (for Arts, Culture and Tourism)
- Succeeded by: Ntombikayise Sibhidla-Saphetha

Personal details
- Born: 1951 or 1952 (age 73–74)
- Citizenship: South Africa
- Party: African National Congress
- Spouse: Brian Thusi (died 2018)

Weziwe Gcotyelwa Thusi (born 1951 or 1952) is a South African politician who represented the African National Congress (ANC) in the KwaZulu-Natal Provincial Legislature and KwaZulu-Natal Executive Council until 2019. Most prominently, she was KwaZulu-Natal's Member of the Executive Council (MEC) for Social Development from 2011 to 2019. She later served as Speaker of the eThekweni Metropolitan Council from 2019 until 2021, when she resigned from politics.

== Political career ==
Thusi was born in 1951 or 1952. She represented the ANC in the KwaZulu-Natal Legislature and Executive Council prior to 2009, including as MEC for Arts, Culture and Tourism under Premier Sbu Ndebele. In the 2009 general election, she was re-elected to the provincial legislature and was appointed MEC for Arts, Culture, Sports and Recreation by newly elected Premier Zweli Mkhize. In November 2011, in a reshuffle by Mkhize, she was appointed MEC for Social Development. She retained the social development portfolio for the next eight years, through the rest of Mkhize's premiership and throughout the tenure of his successors, Senzo Mchunu and Willies Mchunu; she was re-elected to her legislative seat in the 2014 general election, ranked 12th on the ANC's provincial party list.

In the 2019 general election, Thusi was re-elected to the provincial legislature, ranked 26th on the ANC's party list, but newly elected Premier Sihle Zikalala appointed Nonhlanhla Khoza to succeed her in the Executive Council. Less than three months into the legislative term, the ANC announced that Thusi would leave the provincial legislature to join the eThekweni Metropolitan Municipality as a local councillor and the ANC's candidate for Speaker of the eThekweni council. She later said that she had intended to resign from politics in 2019 but had felt obliged to represent the ANC in eThekweni when asked by the party. She was elected as eThekweni Speaker in early September 2019, succeeding William Mapena. She left the council after the 2021 local elections, in which the ANC did not nominate her for re-election as a councillor.

== Personal life ==
Thusi was married to jazz musician Nhlanhla Brian Thusi, who died in July 2018.
