= Meshack Radebe =

South African politician (1948/1949–2021)

Member of the KwaZulu-Natal Provincial Legislature
- In office until 7 May 2019

Member of the KwaZulu-Natal Executive Council for Agriculture, Rural Development and Environmental Affairs
- In office November 2011 – May 2014
- Premier: Zweli Mkhize; Senzo Mchunu
- Preceded by: Lydia Johnson
- Succeeded by: Cyril Xaba (for Agriculture and Rural Development)

Member of the KwaZulu-Natal Executive Council for Social Development
- In office May 2009 – November 2011
- Premier: Zweli Mkhize
- Succeeded by: Weziwe Thusi

Personal details
- Born: 1948 or 1949 Maqongqo, Natal Province; Union of South Africa
- Died: 6 February 2021 (aged 72–73)
- Party: African National Congress

Bonginkosi Meshack Radebe (1948/1949 – 6 February 2021) is a South African politician who represented the African National Congress (ANC) in the KwaZulu-Natal Legislature until May 2019. He was formerly Deputy Speaker in the legislature and also served as a Member of the Executive Council (MEC) in KwaZulu-Natal from 2009 to 2014. He was known for his role in mediating the political violence between the ANC and Inkatha in Mpumalanga, KwaZulu-Natal in the 1990s.

== Early life and political career ==
Radebe was born in 1948 or 1949 and was from Maqongqo in Natal province. In the early 1990s, he lived in Hammarsdale in Natal and was a prominent figure in the nearby township of Mpumalanga, where he helped mediate the ongoing political violence between ANC supporters and supporters of Inkatha, later renamed the Inkatha Freedom Party (IFP). In 1993, Olusegun Obasanjo awarded Radebe and his IFP counterpart, Sipho Mlaba, the inaugural Africa Peace Award, organised by peace organisation ACCORD. Radebe and Mlaba were also awarded honorary doctorates by the University of Natal. IFP leader Mangosuthu Buthelezi later heralded Radebe as a "champion of reconciliation".

== Legislative career ==
After the end of apartheid, Radebe represented the ANC in the KwaZulu-Natal Provincial Legislature. After the 2009 general election, newly elected Premier Zweli Mkhize appointed him to the KwaZulu-Natal Executive Council as MEC for Social Development, an office Radebe retained until a reshuffle in November 2011, when he was appointed MEC for Agriculture, Rural Development and Environmental Affairs. Mkhize's successor, Senzo Mchunu, retained Radebe in the latter portfolio until the 2014 general election.

In the 2014 election, Radebe was re-elected to final term in the provincial legislature, ranked ninth on the ANC's provincial party list. He was not reappointed to the Executive Council by Mchunu, but was instead elected as Deputy Speaker of the KwaZulu-Natal Legislature, serving under Speaker Lydia Johnson. The opposition Democratic Alliance (DA) and IFP disdained his appointment, with the DA saying it exemplified "a trend whereby failed MECs from the ruling party come to the legislature to take up positions at the speaker's office". In 2015, Radebe was elected to the Provincial Executive Committee of the ANC's KwaZulu-Natal branch.

== Resignation and death ==
Radebe did not stand for re-election to the provincial legislature in the 2019 general election, but instead resigned to focus on running his charitable foundation. He remained an outspoken ally of former president Jacob Zuma, who said after his death that Radebe had been his "best friend". Radebe died on 6 February 2021 after a week in hospital.
