= Ravi Pillay =

South African attorney and politician (born 1958)

KwaZulu-Natal MEC for Economic Development, Tourism and Environmental Affairs
- In office 17 November 2020 – 9 August 2022
- Premier: Sihle Zikalala
- Preceded by: Nomusa Dube-Ncube
- Succeeded by: Siboniso Duma

KwaZulu-Natal MEC for Finance
- In office 27 May 2019 – 17 November 2020
- Premier: Sihle Zikalala
- Preceded by: Belinda Scott
- Succeeded by: Nomusa Dube-Ncube

KwaZulu-Natal MEC for Human Settlements and Public Works
- In office 15 November 2011 – 27 May 2019
- Premier: Willies Mchunu; Senzo Mchunu; Zweli Mkhize
- Preceded by: Maggie Govender
- Succeeded by: Peggy Nkonyeni

Member of the KwaZulu-Natal Legislature
- In office 6 May 2009 – 9 August 2022

Personal details
- Born: Ravigasen Ranganathan Pillay; 18 November 1958 (age 67) Port Shepstone, Natal Province
- Party: African National Congress
- Education: University of Durban-Westville
- Profession: Attorney; Politician

Ravigasen Ranganathan "Ravi" Pillay (born 18 November 1958) is a South African attorney and African National Congress (ANC) politician who served as the Member of the Executive Council for Economic Development, Tourism and Environmental Affairs in the KwaZulu-Natal Provincial Government from November 2020 until August 2022. He was the MEC for Finance from May 2019 to November 2020 and the MEC for Human Settlements and Public Works from 2011 to 2019. Pillay was elected to the KwaZulu-Natal Legislature in 2009 and served as the legislature's chief whip of the majority party from 2009 to 2011.

== Early life and education ==
Pillay was born on 18 November 1958 in Port Shepstone in the Natal Province. He studied at the University of Durban-Westville and obtained both a BA degree and an LLB degree. He was a student activist at the university and joined the ANC in 1981.

== Political career ==
After apartheid, Pillay became the inaugural speaker of the Hibiscus Coast Local Municipality and was later promoted to be speaker of the Ugu District Municipality.

Pillay was elected as an MPL in May 2009. He was then appointed the chief whip of the ANC caucus in the legislature. Later, in November 2011, he was appointed as the MEC for Human Settlements and Public Works. He served in the post under three premiers from 2011 to 2019: Zweli Mkhize, Senzo Mchunu and Willies Mchunu.

Pillay was appointed acting premier in March 2018, becoming the first Indian South African to hold the post. He had since been acting premier on multiple occasions.

In May 2019, Pillay became the MEC for Finance in the cabinet of Sihle Zikalala. He took over from Belinda Scott, who left the provincial government. Pillay was appointed as the MEC for Economic Development, Tourism and Environmental Affairs in November 2020, replacing Nomusa Dube-Ncube.

On 9 August 2022, Pillay resigned from the provincial government and the provincial legislature.

Political offices
Preceded by Nomusa Dube-Ncube	KwaZulu-Natal MEC for Economic Development, Tourism and Environmental Affairs; 17 November 2020 – 10 August 2022	Succeeded by
Preceded by Belinda Scott	KwaZulu-Natal MEC for Finance; 27 May 2019 – 17 November 2020	Succeeded by Nomusa Dube-Ncube
Preceded by Maggie Govender	KwaZulu-Natal MEC for Human Settlements and Public Works; 15 November 2011 – 27 May 2019	Succeeded by Peggy Nkonyeni
