= Maggie Govender =

South African politician

Maggie Govender MPL

Member of the KwaZulu-Natal Provincial Legislature

Member of the KwaZulu-Natal Executive Council for Human Settlements and Public Works
- In office May 2009 – November 2011
- Premier: Zweli Mkhize
- Succeeded by: Ravi Pillay

Personal details
- Born: Durban, Natal province South Africa
- Party: African National Congress
- Spouse: Charm Govender (m. 1984; died 2021)
- Education: University of Durban-Westville

Magesvari "Maggie" Govender is a South African politician who represents the African National Congress (ANC) in the KwaZulu-Natal Provincial Legislature. A former anti-apartheid activist, she was KwaZulu-Natal's Member of the Executive Council (MEC) for Human Settlements and Public Works between 2009 and 2011 and she has served as an ordinary Member of the Provincial Legislature since leaving that office.

== Early life and activism ==
Govender was born in Durban in present-day KwaZulu-Natal (then Natal province) and grew up in Durban Central. When she was eleven years old, her family was forcibly resettled to Chatsworth, a township designated for Indians under the apartheid-era Group Areas Act. She matriculated at Chatsworth Secondary School and enrolled in a medical degree at the University of Durban-Westville. In her second year at the university, she transferred to a humanities degree and also became politically active through the student representative council, the Natal Indian Congress, and the Chatsworth Housing Action Committee. She later joined the United Democratic Front.

She qualified as a teacher and began work at a school in Chatsworth in 1984. She remained active in the anti-apartheid movement and was detained without trial for four months during the 1986 state of emergency. After her release she moved to a different secondary school in Umkomaas, where she worked until she resigned in 1988. She subsequently worked for three years as an education officer at the Garment Workers' Union, which during her tenure affiliated to the ANC-aligned Congress of South African Trade Unions, and then as a coordinator at the Community Research Unit, before she returned to teaching. She joined the ANC and the allied South African Communist Party while the organisations were still banned by the apartheid government, and she was an underground operative for the ANC's Operation Vula. She attended the Convention for a Democratic South Africa as a delegate.

== Career in government ==
After the end of apartheid, Govender joined the KwaZulu-Natal Legislature, representing the ANC. Pursuant to the 2009 general election, Premier Zweli Mkhize appointed her to the KwaZulu-Natal Executive Council as MEC for Human Settlements and Public Works. She held that office until November 2011, when Mkhize announced a cabinet reshuffle in which she was sacked and replaced by Ravi Pillay.

However, she remained an ordinary Member of the Provincial Legislature, and she was re-elected to her legislative seat in the 2014 general election, ranked 21st on the ANC's provincial party list, and in the 2019 general election, ranked 28th. She was co-opted onto the Provincial Executive Committee of the ANC's KwaZulu-Natal branch in 2018 but was not re-elected in 2022.

== Personal life ==
Govender was married to Pathsarvasvaran Samotharan "Charm" Govender (9 April 1961 – 22 March 2021), whom she met as a student activist at the University of Durban-Westville and who worked at the South African Revenue Service after the end of apartheid. They married in 1984 and had two sons, Megalen and Yeshelen, born in the 1980s.
