= Thami Ntuli =

Premier of KwaZulu-Natal since 2024

The Honourable Thamsanqa Ntuli MPL
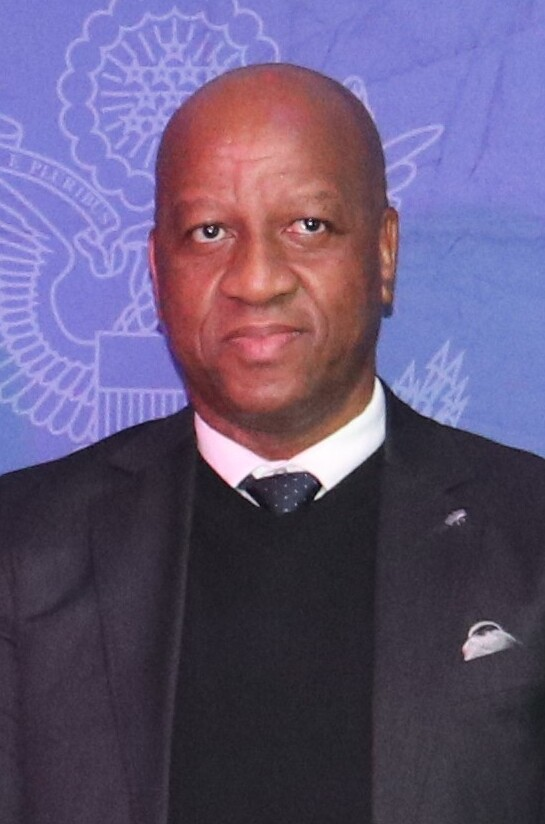
- Ntuli in 2024

10th Premier of KwaZulu-Natal
- Incumbent
- Assumed office 18 June 2024
- Monarch: Misuzulu
- Preceded by: Nomusa Dube-Ncube

Mayor of the King Cetshwayo District Municipality
- In office 22 November 2021 – 14 June 2024
- Deputy: Sikhumbuzo Dlamini
- Preceded by: Nonhle Mkhulisi (ANC)

Mayor of Nkandla Local Municipality
- In office 10 December 2012 – 31 October 2021
- Deputy: Cllr. MB Biyela
- Preceded by: ANC/NFP Alliance (Zama)
- Succeeded by: Cllr. MB Biyela

Provincial Chairperson of the Inkatha Freedom Party in KwaZulu-Natal
- Incumbent
- Assumed office 29 June 2019
- Deputy: Mduduzi Myeza
- Leader: Velenkosini Hlabisa
- Preceded by: Mbangiseni Yengwa

SALGA Chairperson in KwaZulu-Natal
- In office March 2022 – 14 June 2024
- Preceded by: Nonhle Mkhulisi (ANC)

Personal details
- Born: Thamsanqa Arthur Ntuli; 11 November 1973 (age 52) Nkandla, KwaZulu, South Africa
- Party: Inkatha Freedom Party
- Other political affiliations: National Teachers Union (2001-2013)
- Spouse: Sindiswa kaSibisi Ntuli
- Children: 6
- Education: Vumanhlamvu Primary; Nomangci Secondary
- Alma mater: Natal University; University of Pretoria; Rand Afrikaans University
- Profession: Educator. Politicians. Businessman.
- Website: ifp.org.za; kcdm.gov.za; salga.org.za

Arthur Thamsanqa Ntuli (born 11 November 1973) is a South African politician who serves as the premier of KwaZulu-Natal since 2024. He is the Provincial Chairperson of the Inkatha Freedom Party. He was the mayor of the Nkandla Local Municipality from 2021 to 2024, and the mayor of the King Cetshwayo District Municipality from 2012 to 2021.

== Early life and education ==
Ntuli was born on 11 November 1973 in Vumanhlamvu, Nkandla. He studied at Vumanhlamvu Primary School, Nomangci Secondary (now Mzikazi Secondary) and Nkandla Secondary. After graduating, he took on different jobs, including working as a cleaner, a cashier, and a security guard.

In 1993, Ntuli began his career in education as a teacher at Mashinga Secondary School, while working towards a diploma in Education at Rand Afrikaans University. He then obtained an Advanced Diploma in Education at the University of Natal (now the University of KwaZulu-Natal) and a Bachelor of Education Honors in Law Management at the University of Pretoria.

== Career ==
For more than 20 years, Ntuli worked as a school teacher and principal in KwaZulu-Natal. In 2010, he began working as a Councilor and Mayor for the Nkandla Local Municipality, and from 2021 to 2024 he acted as Mayor of the King Cetshwayo District Municipality. He then resigned to run in the 2024 provincial elections.

=== Premier of KwaZulu-Natal ===
On 29 January 2024, the Inkatha Freedom Party (IFP) announced Thami Ntuli as their KwaZulu-Natal Premier candidate for the 2024 general elections. On 14 June, Ntuli was elected as Premier of KwaZulu-Natal in a sitting of the provincial legislature. He was elected with coalition support from the IFP, African National Congress (ANC), Democratic Alliance (DA) and National Freedom Party (NFP), Ntuli defeated the MK Party's premier candidate, Zulu Nation's deputy prime minister Phathisizwe Chiliza, with 41 votes to 39. Ntuli is the first IFP member to serve as Premier of KwaZulu-Natal since 2004. Thami Ntuli was officially inaugurated as the Premier of KwaZulu-Natal on 18 June 2024.

Ntuli announced a new provincial cabinet on 18 June which included 10 members, four from the Inkatha Freedom Party, three from the African National Congress, two from the Democratic Alliance and one from the National Freedom Party. He announced that the Department of Community Safety and Liaison would be placed directly under the Office of the Premier.

In line with the coalition agreement between the parties, the members of the executive council were chosen according to the portfolios their party would take in. The IFP leads four portfolios: government business; cooperative governance and traditional affairs (known collectively as Cogta); agriculture; and sports. The ANC, with the second most portfolios, leads health, education, transport and human settlements. The DA leads finance and public works while the National Freedom Party (NFP) leads social development.

The list of MECs:

- Economic development — Musa Zondi (IFP);
- Cogta — Thulasizwe Buthelezi (IFP);
- Health — Nomagugu Simelane (ANC);
- Social development — Mbali Shinga (NFP);
- Public works — Lucas Meyer (DA);
- Finance — Francois Rogers (DA);
- Agriculture — Thembeni Madlopha Mthethwa (IFP);
- Transport and human settlements — Siboniso Duma (ANC);
- Education — Sipho Hlomuka (ANC); and
- Sports, arts and culture — Mntomuhle Khawula (IFP).

In December 2025, Ntuli narrowly survived a MK-sponsored motion of no confidence vote in the KwaZulu-Natal legislature, with 39 votes to 40.
