= Premier of KwaZulu-Natal =

Head of government KwaZulu-Natal, South Africa

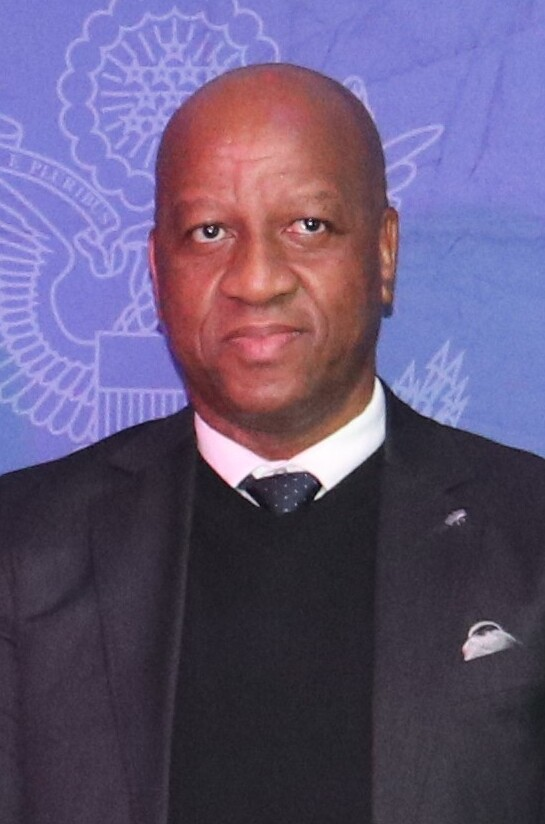
- Incumbent; Thami Ntuli since 18 June 2024
- Style: The Honourable
- Member of: Executive Council of KwaZulu-Natal
- Appointer: KwaZulu-Natal Legislature
- Term length: Five years, renewable once
- Constituting instrument: Constitution of South Africa
- Inaugural holder: Frank Mdlalose
- Formation: 7 May 1994
- Website: http://www.kznonline.gov.za/

The premier of KwaZulu-Natal is the head of government of the KwaZulu-Natal province of South Africa. The current premier of KwaZulu-Natal is Thami Ntuli, a member of the Inkatha Freedom Party. He took office on 18 June 2024.

== Functions ==
In terms of the Constitution of South Africa, the executive authority of each province is entrusted in the province's premier. The premier appoints an Executive Council consisting of ten members of the provincial legislature; they are called members of the Executive Council (MECs). The MECs are effectively ministers in the provincial government, and the Executive Council is effectively the premier's cabinet. MECs serve at the premier's discretion. The premier and the Executive Council are responsible for implementing provincial legislation and any national legislation allocated to the province. They set provincial policy and manage the departments of the provincial government; their actions are subject to the national constitution.

In order for an act of the provincial legislature to become law, the premier must sign it. If he believes that the act is unconstitutional, it can be referred back to the legislature for reconsideration. If the premier and the legislature cannot agree, the act must be referred to the Constitutional Court for final consideration. The premier is also ex officio a member of the National Council of Provinces, the upper house of Parliament, as one of the special delegates from his province.

== Election ==
Elections to the KwaZulu-Natal Provincial Legislature must be held every five years, usually at the same time as the election of the National Assembly; the last such election occurred on 14 June 2024. At the first meeting of the provincial legislature after an election, the members indirectly elect the premier from amongst themselves.

The provincial legislature can force the premier to resign by a motion of no confidence. If the premiership becomes vacant (for whatever reason) the provincial legislature must choose a new premier to serve out the period until the next election. One person cannot have served more than two five-year terms as premier; however, when a premier is chosen to fill a vacancy the time until the next election does not count as a term.

== List ==
Inkatha Freedom Party
African National Congress

No.	Portrait	Name (Birth–Death)	Term of office			Political party	Monarch (Reign)
No.	Portrait	Name (Birth–Death)	Took office	Left office	Time in office	Political party	Monarch (Reign)
1		Frank Mdlalose (1931–2021)	11 May 1994	1 March 1997	2 years, 294 days	Inkatha Freedom Party	N/A
2		Ben Ngubane (1941–2021)	1 March 1997 (acting until 19 March)	10 February 1999	1 year, 346 days	Inkatha Freedom Party	N/A
3		Lionel Mtshali (1935–2015)	10 February 1999	23 April 2004	5 years, 73 days	Inkatha Freedom Party	N/A
4		S'bu Ndebele (born 1948)	23 April 2004	6 May 2009	5 years, 13 days	African National Congress	Goodwill Zwelithini (2005–2021) (Note: Ruled as King of the Zulus since 1968, was legally recognised as King of the Province of KwaZulu-Natal in 2005.)
5		Zweli Mkhize (born 1956)	6 May 2009	22 August 2013	4 years, 108 days	African National Congress	Goodwill Zwelithini (2005–2021)
6		Senzo Mchunu (born 1958)	22 August 2013	24 May 2016	2 years, 276 days	African National Congress	Goodwill Zwelithini (2005–2021)
7		Willies Mchunu (born 1948)	24 May 2016	27 May 2019	3 years, 3 days	African National Congress	Goodwill Zwelithini (2005–2021)
8		Sihle Zikalala (born 1973)	27 May 2019	5 August 2022	3 years, 70 days	African National Congress	Goodwill Zwelithini (2005–2021)
9		Nomusa Dube-Ncube	10 August 2022	18 June 2024		African National Congress	Misuzulu (2021-Present)
10		Thami Ntuli (born 1973)	18 June 2024	incumbent	2 years, 81 days	Inkatha Freedom Party	Misuzulu (2021-Present)

== See also ==
- Premier (South Africa)
- President of South Africa
- Politics of South Africa
