= Nomusa Dube-Ncube =

South African politician

The Honourable Nomusa Dube-Ncube Dr.
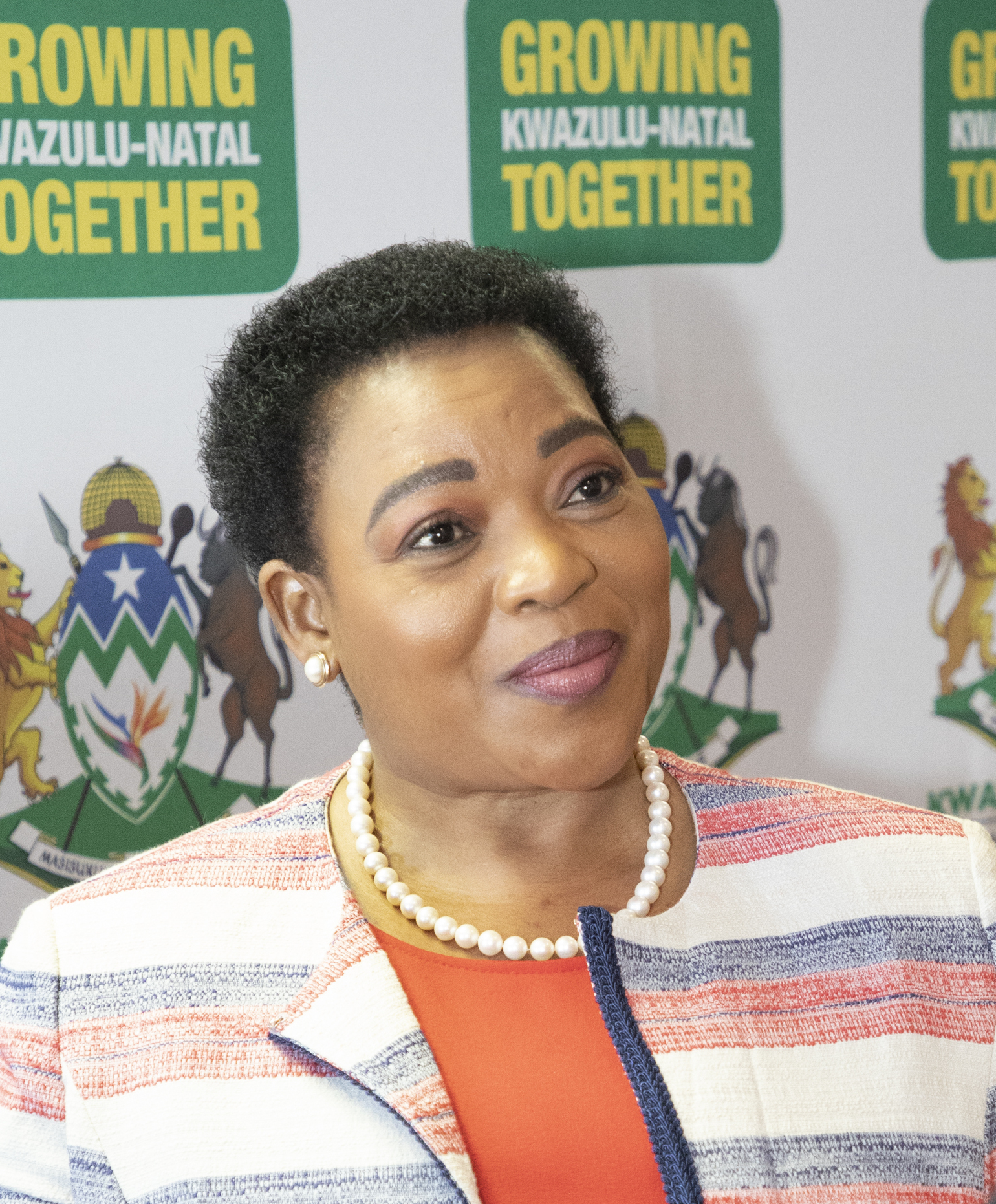
- Dube-Ncube in July 2022

Deputy Minister of Higher Education and Training
- Incumbent
- Assumed office 22 July 2025
- Preceded by: Buti Manamela

9th Premier of KwaZulu-Natal
- In office 10 August 2022 – 18 June 2024
- Monarch: Misuzulu
- Premier: Sihle Zikalala
- Preceded by: Sihle Zikalala
- Succeeded by: Thami Ntuli

KwaZulu-Natal MEC for Finance
- In office 17 November 2020 – 10 August 2022
- Preceded by: Ravi Pillay
- Succeeded by: Peggy Nkonyeni

KwaZulu-Natal MEC for Economic Development, Tourism and Environmental Affairs
- In office 27 May 2019 – 17 November 2020
- Premier: Sihle Zikalala
- Preceded by: Sipho Hlomuka
- Succeeded by: Ravi Pillay

KwaZulu-Natal MEC for Cooperative Governance and Traditional Affairs
- In office 29 July 2009 – 27 May 2019
- Premier: Zweli Mkhize; Senzo Mchunu; Willies Mchunu
- Preceded by: Willies Mchunu
- Succeeded by: Sipho Hlomuka

Personal details
- Party: African National Congress
- Spouse: Sibusiso Ncube (Until 2022; his death)
- Profession: Politician

Nomusa Dube-Ncube is a South African politician and former diplomat who was the 9th Premier of KwaZulu-Natal from August 2022 to June 2024. She currently serves as Deputy Minister of Higher Education and Training since 22 July 2025. A member of the African National Congress, she is the first woman to hold the office of being the Premier of KwaZulu-Natal. She was succeeded by Thami Ntuli.

Previously, she served as the Member of the Executive Council (MEC) for Cooperative Governance and Traditional Affairs from July 2009 to May 2019, as the MEC for Economic Development, Tourism and Environmental Affairs from May 2019 until November 2020, and as the MEC for Finance from November 2020 until her appointment as premier in August 2022. Prior to serving in the legislature, she was South Africa's ambassador to the Czech Republic.

== Early life ==
Nomusa Dube-Ncube was born in KwaMashu. She has completed diplomas in public management, management and leadership as well as training and development. She holds a master's degree in public administration, a Doctor of Administration from the University of KwaZulu-Natal.

== Political career ==
Dube-Ncube served as the mayor of the North Central council before it was merged into the eThekwini Metropolitan Municipality in 2000. She then served as chief whip of the eThekwini council until her appointment as ambassador to the Czech Republic. She was elected to the KwaZulu-Natal Legislature in May 2009 and the ANC appointed her as chief whip. She held this position until July 2009, when premier Zweli Mkhize appointed her to the position of MEC for Cooperative Governance and Traditional Affairs. Senzo Mchunu was elected premier in 2013, and Mchunu reappointed her to her position. Dube-Ncube remained in the position following Willies Mchunu's election as premier in May 2016.

In May 2019, she was appointed MEC for Economic Development, Tourism and Environmental Affairs by the newly elected premier, Sihle Zikalala. On 17 November 2020, Dube-Mncube was appointed MEC for Finance, replacing Ravi Pillay.

In January 2022, The Mercury reported that Dube-Ncube was vying for the position of provincial chairperson of the ANC ahead of the party's provincial elective conference to be held by July 2022. She had been endorsed by the provincial African National Congress Women's League. At the conference on 23 July 2022, she qualified for nomination to contest the provincial chairperson position and was nominated from the floor, but she didn't meet the required 25% threshold of support from delegates to qualify for the voting ballot.

== Premiership ==
Following the resignation of premier Sihle Zikalala on 5 August 2022, Dube-Ncube was one of three candidates the provincial ANC recommended to replace Zikalala. The following day, Dube-Ncube was interviewed by the members of the ANC's National Executive Committee for the position. Dube-Ncube was announced as the party's preferred candidate for premier on 8 August 2022. On 10 August 2022, Dube-Ncube was elected as premier during a special sitting of the KwaZulu-Natal Legislature in Mooi River. She defeated the DA's Mmabatho Tembe in a vote that went 45–11. She was sworn in by Acting Judge President Isaac Madondo later that day. Dube-Ncube was the first woman to serve as premier of the province. She was succeeded by Thami Ntuli of the Inkatha Freedom Party following the 2024 provincial election.

== Personal life ==
Dube-Ncube was married to businessman Sibusiso Ncube until his death in January 2022.
