= Willies Mchunu =

South African politician (born 1948)

The Honourable Thembinkosi Willies Mchunu
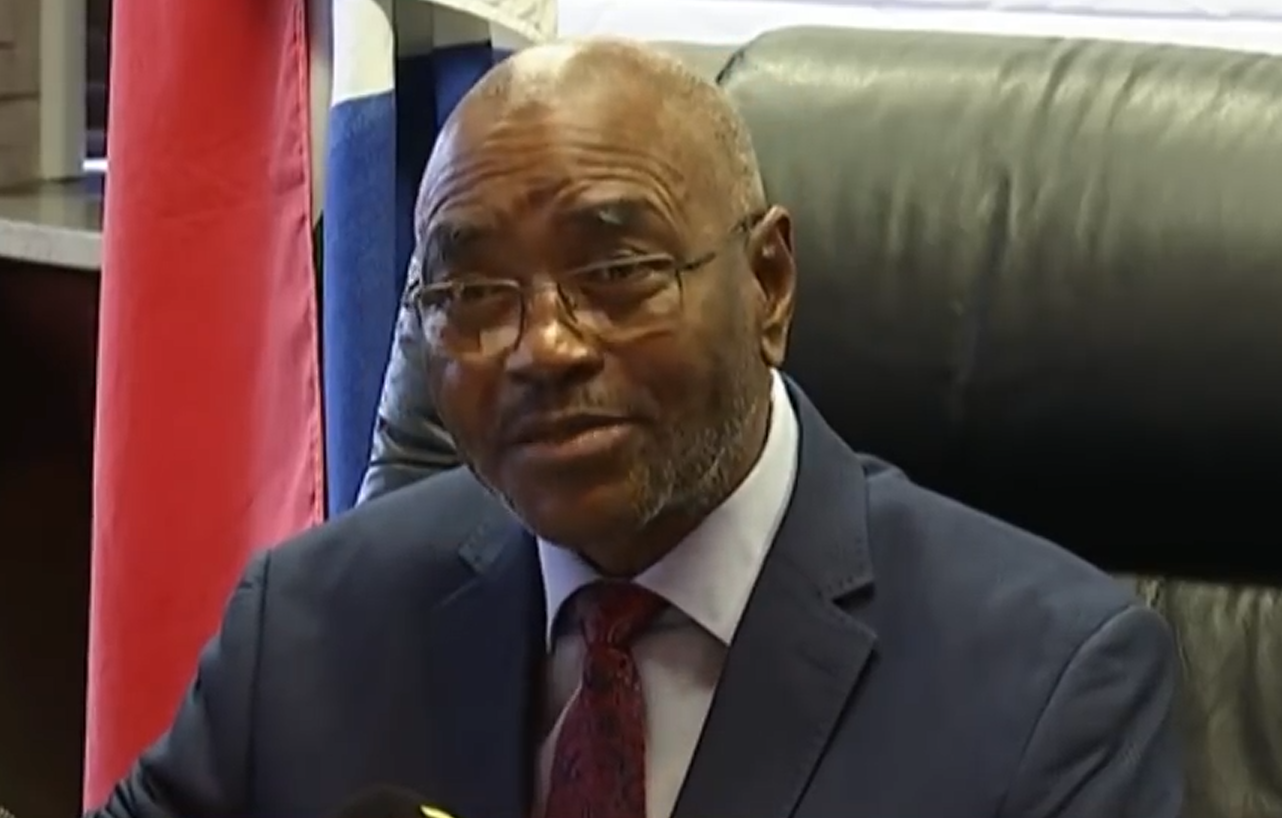
- Mchunu in April 2019

7th Premier of KwaZulu-Natal
- In office 24 May 2016 – 27 May 2019
- Monarch: Goodwill Zwelithini
- Preceded by: Senzo Mchunu
- Succeeded by: Sihle Zikalala

Personal details
- Born: Thembinkosi Willies Mchunu; 11 May 1948 (age 78)
- Party: uMkhonto weSizwe (since 2024); African National Congress (until 2024)
- Spouse(s): Zodwa Mchunu (m. 2018–present); Dudu Mchunu (d. 2016)

Willies Mchunu (born 11 May 1948) was the 7th Premier of KwaZulu-Natal province in South Africa. He was previously a Member of the Executive Council (MEC) for the Department of Transport, Community Safety, and Liaison in the province. He was a member of the African National Congress and the former chairperson of the South African Communist Party (SACP) in KwaZulu-Natal (KZN) and was a member of the Central Committee of the SACP.

He is seen as a close ally of former South African President Jacob Zuma, and resigned from the ANC in 2024 to join Zuma's uMkhonto weSizwe (MK). Mchunu was appointed the party's KZN convener.

He was removed from the position in April 2026 as part of MK's collapsing of provincial structures into the executive.

== Controversies ==
=== Violence at the Kennedy Road informal settlement in 2009 ===
Willies Mchunu's response to the violent attacks on Abahlali baseMjondolo at the Kennedy Road informal settlement in 2009 was and remains controversial. At the time of the attack, he claimed that the attacks were by a "criminal forum" associated with Abahlali baseMjondolo president S'bu Zikode. Abahlali baseMjondolo and many civil society organizations have called the attack on Abahlali baseMjondolo and Kennedy Road residents politically motivated and blame Mchunu for condoning the attacks by an armed group affiliated with the ANC . Mchunu's response to the attacks was also criticised by Bishop Rubin Phillip and Archbishop Thabo Makgoba. Mchunu refused calls for an independent investigation into the attacks. Amnesty International sent a letter of concern to Willies Mchunu, but there was no response from his office.

On 18 July 2011, the case against the twelve members of Abahlali baseMjondolo arrested after the attacks was thrown out of court. The Socio-Economic Rights Institute of South Africa issued a statement saying that the "charges were based on evidence which now appears almost certainly to have been manufactured" and noting that the Magistrate had described the state witnesses as "belligerent", "unreliable", and "dishonest".

According to Paul Trewhela, "The scandal is that this political prosecution was instituted in the first place, and that it was dragged on, month after month, by magistrates, prosecutions and police without a shred of reliable evidence - with plentiful evidence, rather, of manipulation and intimidation of witnesses by the police and local ANC structures."

=== Deaths During Traffic Department 'Fitness Test' in 2012 ===
In last 2012 six applicants for positions as traffic officers died during a fitness test and another committed suicide following which there were calls for Mchunu's resignation.

=== Fields Hill 2013 Crash ===
Since 24 people were killed on 5 September 2013 in one of the most horrific accidents on Fields Hill, the 2013 Pinetown crash, Willies Mchunu has discounted calls from residents for the banning of trucks on the "Hill of Horrors" as it has become known. Local City Councillor Rick Crouch has been vocal about the Provincial Government's failure in stopping the carnage on Fields Hill, going as far as accusing the KwaZulu-Natal MEC for Transport, Community Safety and Liaison, Willies Mchunu, of practicing tombstone legislation. Councillor Crouch has been campaigning for stricter rules for trucks on Fields Hill.
