= List of members of the 6th KwaZulu-Natal Legislature =

Elected legislature of the KwaZulu-Natal province

6th KwaZulu-Natal Legislature
←	5th Legislature	7th Legislature	→
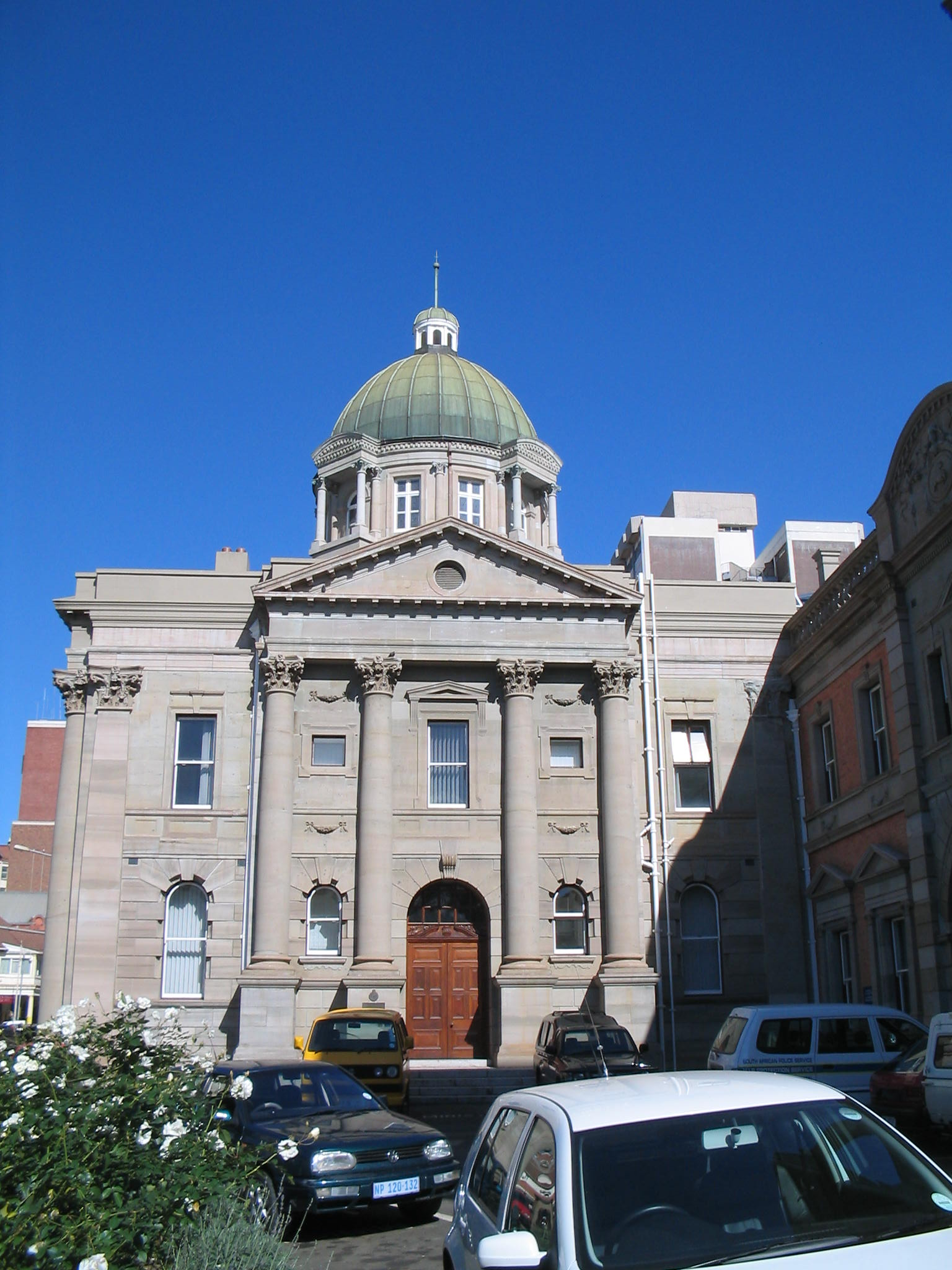
- KwaZulu-Natal Parliament Building

Overview
- Legislative body: KwaZulu-Natal Legislature
- Jurisdiction: KwaZulu-Natal, South Africa
- Meeting place: KwaZulu-Natal Parliament Building; 239 Langalibalele Street, Pietermaritzburg
- Term: 22 May 2019 – 28 May 2024
- Election: 8 May 2019
- Government: Executive Council of Sihle Zikalala; Executive Council of Nomusa Dube-Ncube
- Members: 80
- Speaker: Ntobeko Boyce
- Deputy Speaker: Themba Mthembu
- Premier: Nomusa Dube-Ncube
- Leader of the Opposition: Blessed Gwala

From May 2019 until May 2024, the KwaZulu-Natal Legislature, official legislature of the KwaZulu-Natal province of South Africa, consisted of 80 members from 8 different political parties, elected on 8 May 2019 in the 2019 South African general election. The ruling African National Congress (ANC) retained its majority in the legislature by earning a total of 44 seats, a loss of eight seats from the previous legislature.

The Inkatha Freedom Party (IFP) (13 seats) regained the title of official opposition, after losing it to the Democratic Alliance (DA) in the 2014 general election. The DA now holds 11 seats, one more than it held in the previous legislative session, and is the third largest party. The Economic Freedom Fighters (EFF) occupy 8 seats, a gain of six from the previous election. Four political parties, including the National Freedom Party (NFP), Minority Front (MF), African Transformation Movement (ATM) and African Christian Democratic Party (ACDP), each hold one seat.

Members of the Provincial Legislature (MPLs) are elected through a system of party-list proportional representation with closed lists. This means that each voter casts a vote for one political party, and seats in the legislature are assigned to the parties in proportion to the number of votes they received. The seats are then filled by members by lists acceded by the parties before the election.

Members of the 6th Provincial Legislature took office on 22 May 2019. During the first sitting, Ntobeko Boyce was elected as the new Speaker with Mluleki Ndobe as the new Deputy Speaker, while Sihle Zikalala was elected Premier. They are all members of the ANC. Velenkosini Hlabisa of the IFP assumed the role of Leader of the Opposition. The legislature dissolved on 28 May 2024, ahead of the 2024 provincial election.

== Composition ==
This is a graphical comparison of party strengths as they are in the 6th KwaZulu-Natal Legislature.

- Note this is not the official seating plan of the KwaZulu-Natal Legislature.

Party	Seats
African National Congress	44
Inkatha Freedom Party	13
DA	11
Economic Freedom Fighters	8
National Freedom Party	1
MF	1
ATM	1
African Christian Democratic Party	1
Total	80

== Members ==
This table depicts the list of members of the 6th KwaZulu-Natal Legislature, as elected in the election of 8 May 2019 and sworn in on 22 May 2019 and taking into account changes in membership since the election. It consists of the members' names, parliamentary group and position.

Name	Parliamentary group	Position
Nomusa Dube-Ncube	ANC	Premier
Sihle Zikalala	ANC	Member
James Nxumalo	ANC	Member
Ntombikayise Sibhidla-Saphetha	ANC	Member
Sipho Hlomuka	ANC	Member
Kwazi Mshengu	ANC	Member
Nomagugu Simelane-Zulu	ANC	Member
Ntobeko Boyce	ANC	Speaker
Nhlakanipho Ntombela	ANC	Member
Vuyiswa Caluza	ANC	Member
Amanda Mapena	ANC	Member
Siboniso Duma	ANC	Member
Zinhle Cele	ANC	Member
Jomo Sibiya	ANC	Member
Mbali Frazer	ANC	Member
Peggy Nkonyeni	ANC	Member
Makhosazane Zungu	ANC	Member
Phumlile Zulu	ANC	Member
Nonhlanhla Khoza	ANC	Member
Super Zuma	ANC	Member
Hlengiwe Mavimbela	ANC	Member
Maggie Govender	ANC	Member
Sipho Caiphas Nkosi	ANC	Member
Bongi Sithole-Moloi	ANC	Member
Mondli Chiliza	ANC	Member
Nomakiki Majola	ANC	Member
Ndodephethe Mthethwa	ANC	Member
Gloria Swartbooi-Ntombela	ANC	Member
Sithembiso Mshengu	ANC	Member
Phumzile Mbatha-Cele	ANC	Member
Linda Hlongwa-Madlala	ANC	Member
Themba Mthembu	ANC	Deputy Speaker
Celiwe Madlopha	ANC	Member
Thulani Xulu	ANC	Member
Ntuthuko Mahlaba	ANC	Member
Sifiso Sonjica	ANC	Member
Nondumiso Cele	ANC	Member
Vusi Dube	ANC	Member
Nozipho Mavuso	ANC	Member
Zandile Gumede	ANC	Member
Hlobisile Dlamini	ANC	Member
Mpumelelo Zulu	ANC	Member
Lusiwe Ngubane	ANC	Member
Themba Mtshali	ANC	Member
Blessed Gwala	IFP	Leader of the Opposition
Phumzile Nokuphiwa	IFP	Member
Nhlanhla Msimango	IFP	Member
Thembeni Mthethwa	IFP	Member
Ncamisile Nkwanyana	IFP	Member
Poobalan Govender	IFP	Member
Mntomuhle Khawula	IFP	Member
Mbongeleni Joshua Mazibuko	IFP	Member
Otto Kunene	IFP	Member
Lourens de Klerk	IFP	Member
Thokozile Joyce Gumede	IFP	Member
Subramoney Moodley	IFP	Member
Francois Rodgers	DA	Leader of the DA
Edwin Baptie	DA	Member
Heinz de Boer	DA	Member
Sharon Hoosen	DA	Member
Imran Keeka	DA	Member
Lukas Meyer	DA	Member
Marlaine Nair	DA	Member
Sthembiso Ngema	DA	Member
Elma Rabe	DA	Member
Bradley Singh	DA	Member
Mmabatho Tembe	DA	Member
Vusumuzi Khoza	EFF	Leader of the EFF
Pearl Harricks	EFF	Member
Mongezi Twala	EFF	Member
Nomvomvo Mpayipheli	EFF	Member
Linda Seja	EFF	Member
Gugu Flora Mtshali	EFF	Member
Sifiso Mthethwa	EFF	Member
Nomvuyelelo Dlamini	EFF	Member
Cynthia Mbali Shinga	NFP	Leader of the NFP and Whip of the Minority Parties
Shameen Thakur-Rajbansi	MF	Leader of the MF
Mxolisi Phakathi	ATM	Leader of the ATM
Eric Manqele	ACDP	Leader of the ACDP

There was high turnover in the ANC caucus. Early in the legislative term in 2019, three MPLs – Mxolisi Kaunda, Mthandeni Dlungwana, and Weziwe Thusi – resigned from the legislature; they were replaced by the next three ANC members on the party list: Nozipho Mavuso, Themba Mtshali, and Lusiwe Ngubane. In 2020, Ricardo Mthembu and Mluleki Ndobe died and were replaced by Zandile Gumede and Hlobisile Dlamini respectively. In early 2021, Bridget Ntshangase and Bheki Ntuli died; they were replaced by Mpumelelo Zulu and Phumlile Zulu in late February. Finally, Ravi Pillay resigned in August 2022 and was replaced by Ntuthuko Mahlaba later the same month.

On the opposition benches, former members include Chris Pappas (resigned in 2021), Mbali Ntuli (resigned in 2022), Zwakele Mncwango (resigned in 2022), Rishigen Viranna (resigned in 2022), and Hlanganani Gumbi (resigned in 2023).
