= List of members of the 7th KwaZulu-Natal Legislature =

7th KwaZulu-Natal Legislature
←	6th Legislature
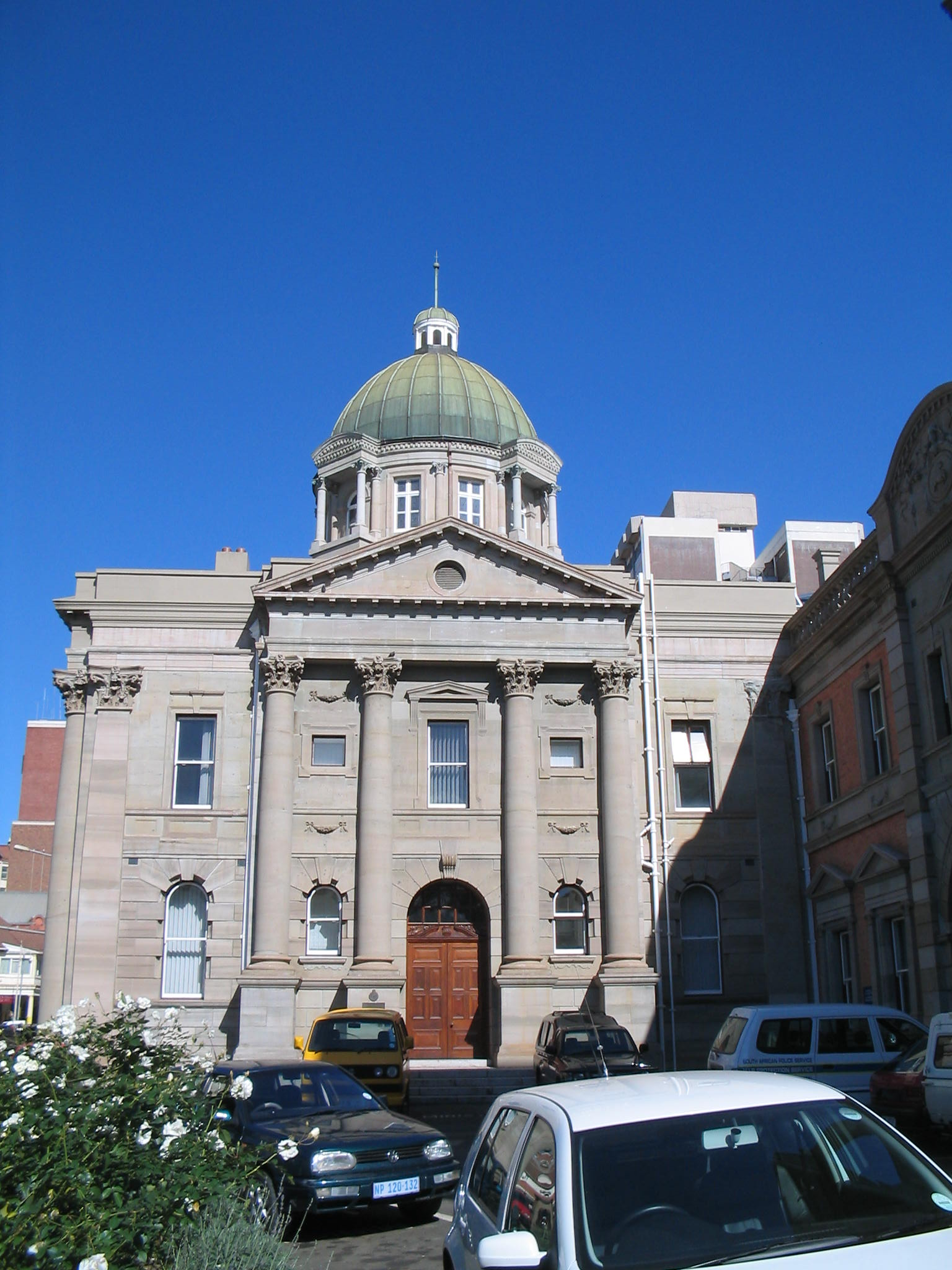
- KwaZulu-Natal Legislature building

Overview
- Legislative body: KwaZulu-Natal Legislature
- Jurisdiction: KwaZulu-Natal
- Meeting place: 239 Langalibalele Street, Pietermaritzburg
- Term: 14 June 2024 –
- Election: 2024
- Government: Executive Council of Thami Ntuli
- Members: 80
- Speaker: Ntobeko Boyce
- Deputy Speaker: Mmabatho Tembe
- Premier: Thami Ntuli
- Leader of the Opposition: Phathisizwe Chiliza

This is a list of members of the seventh KwaZulu-Natal Legislature, as elected in the 2024 KwaZulu-Natal provincial election. Members were sworn in on 14 June 2024 during the first sitting of the provincial legislature.

== Composition ==
This is a graphical comparison of party strengths as they are in the 7th KwaZulu-Natal Legislature.

- Note this is not the official seating plan of the KwaZulu-Natal Legislature.

Party	Seats
Umkhonto weSizwe	37
Inkatha Freedom Party	15
ANC	14
Democratic Alliance	11
Economic Freedom Fighters	2
National Freedom Party	1
Total	80

== Leadership ==
- Speaker: Ntobeko Boyce (ANC)
- Deputy: Mmabatho Tembe (DA)
- Premier: Thami Ntuli (IFP)
- Leader of the Opposition: Phathisizwe Chiliza (MK)

== Members ==
Name	Parliamentary group	Position
Ntobeko Boyce	African National Congress	Speaker
Ishana Barciela	uMkhonto weSizwe Party	Member
Satishrai Bhanprakash	Inkatha Freedom Party	Member
Andile Biyela	Inkatha Freedom Party	Member
Tim Brauteseth	Democratic Alliance	Member
Phumzile Buthelezi	Inkatha Freedom Party	Member
Thulasizwe Buthelezi	Inkatha Freedom Party	Member
Ntombi Cele	uMkhonto weSizwe Party	Member
Phathisizwe Chiliza	uMkhonto weSizwe Party	Member
Tammy Colley	Democratic Alliance	Member
Shontel de Boer	Democratic Alliance	Member
Mervyn Dirks	uMkhonto weSizwe Party	Member
Mthandeni Dlungwana	African National Congress	Member
Siboniso Duma	African National Congress	Member
Mbali Frazer	African National Congress	Member
Nonhlanhla Gamede	uMkhonto weSizwe Party	Member
Nompumelelo Gasa	uMkhonto weSizwe Party	Member
Judith Gasa	uMkhonto weSizwe Party	Member
Blessed Gwala	Inkatha Freedom Party	Member
Riona Gokool	Democratic Alliance	Member
Lucky Hadebe	uMkhonto weSizwe Party	Member
Sipho Hlomuka	African National Congress	Member
Imran Keeka	Democratic Alliance	Member
Cedrick Khanyi	uMkhonto weSizwe Party	Member
Mntomuhle Khawula	Inkatha Freedom Party	Member
Bongani Khoza	uMkhonto weSizwe Party	Member
Nobuhle Khumalo	uMkhonto weSizwe Party	Member
Lourens de Klerk	Inkatha Freedom Party	Member
Otto Kunene	Inkatha Freedom Party	Member
Themba Mabaso	uMkhonto weSizwe Party	Member
Smanga Mabaso	uMkhonto weSizwe Party	Member
Celiwe Madlopha	African National Congress	Member
Thuthukani Madondo	uMkhonto weSizwe Party	Member
Esau Madonsela	uMkhonto weSizwe Party	Member
S'thembiso Magubane	uMkhonto weSizwe Party	Member
Ntuthuko Mahlabaa	African National Congress	Member
Mncedisi Maphisa	Inkatha Freedom Party	Member
Fikile Masiko	African National Congress	Member
Luntu Maxegwana	uMkhonto weSizwe Party	Member
Nozipho Mazibuko	uMkhonto weSizwe Party	Member
Siphiwe Mbatha	uMkhonto weSizwe Party	Member
Martin Meyer	Democratic Alliance	Member
Phumlani Mfeka	uMkhonto weSizwe Party	Member
Thabiso Mhayeka	uMkhonto weSizwe Party	Member
Sizophila Mkhize	African National Congress	Member
Bongumusa Mkhize	uMkhonto weSizwe Party	Member
Wiseman Mkhize	uMkhonto weSizwe Party	Member
Mafika Mndebele	African National Congress	Member
Sakhile Mngadi	Democratic Alliance	Member
Bonginkosi Mngadi	uMkhonto weSizwe Party	Member
Petros Msimango	Inkatha Freedom Party	Member
Thembeni Petty Mthethwa	Inkatha Freedom Party	Member
Emmanuel Mthethwa	uMkhonto weSizwe Party	Member
Mphikeleli Mthethwa	uMkhonto weSizwe Party	Member
Muzi Mtshali	uMkhonto weSizwe Party	Member
Marlaine Nair	Democratic Alliance	Member
Thokozane Andrew Nene	uMkhonto weSizwe Party	Member
Eve Ngcobo	uMkhonto weSizwe Party	Member
Zamangcobo Ngcobo	uMkhonto weSizwe Party	Member
Noluthando Dlamini	Inkatha Freedom Party	Member
Hlobisile Dlamini	uMkhonto weSizwe Party	Member
Thobisile Nkosi	Economic Freedom Fighters	Member
Ncamisile Nkwanyana	Inkatha Freedom Party	Member
Thami Ntuli	Inkatha Freedom Party	Premier
Dudu Nzama	uMkhonto weSizwe Party	Member
Francois Rodgers	Democratic Alliance	Member
Slindile Seme	uMkhonto weSizwe Party	Member
Mbali Shinga	National Freedom Party	Member
Sibusiso Sikhakhane	uMkhonto weSizwe Party	Member
Nomagugu Simelane	African National Congress	Member
Bongi Sithole-Moloi	African National Congress	Member
Mmabatho Tembe	Democratic Alliance	Deputy Speaker
Mongezi Twala	Economic Freedom Fighters	Member
Hannah Lidgett	Democratic Alliance	Member
Godfrey Xaba	uMkhonto weSizwe Party	Member
Musa Zondi	Inkatha Freedom Party	Member
Super Zuma	African National Congress	Member
Thobani Zuma	uMkhonto weSizwe Party	Member
Vincent Zuma	uMkhonto weSizwe Party	Member
Cebile Zuma-Dube	uMkhonto weSizwe Party	Member
