= Alpha Shelembe =

South African politician

Member of the KwaZulu-Natal Provincial Legislature
- In office 21 May 2014 – 7 May 2019

Personal details
- Born: KwaShifu, Umgungundlovu; Natal, South Africa
- Party: African National Congress

Alpha Shelembe is a South African politician who represented the African National Congress (ANC) in the KwaZulu-Natal Provincial Legislature from 2014 to 2019. Between 2006 and 2011, he was a local councillor in Msunduzi Local Municipality, where he was Speaker from 2006 to 2010 and Deputy Mayor for a brief period in 2011. He resigned from the council in June 2011 after prolonged protests calling for his removal. He is also known for his activities as a local ANC leader in the party's Moses Mabhida branch in Umgungundlovu, including as the branch's regional chairperson between 2012 and 2014.

== Early life ==
Shelembe is from KwaShifu near Howick in present-day KwaZulu-Natal (formerly Natal province). Shelembe's father, Prophet Bhekinduna L. Shelembe, was the leader of EKuphumuleni Nazareth Baptist Church which is one of the factions of the Shembe Church. Bhekinduna was married several times and Shelembe was the eldest of several siblings, including a twin brother, Omega, who reportedly later worked at the National Treasury and Ithala Bank. According to the Witness, Shelembe was an Inkatha activist in the 1980s and 1990s.

== Local government ==
After the end of apartheid in 1994, Shelembe defected to the African National Congress (ANC), Inkatha's main rival in KwaZulu-Natal, and was elected to represent the ANC as a local councillor. Among other positions, he served in the Mayoral Committee in Umgungundlovu District Municipality.

=== Msunduzi Council: 2006–2011 ===
==== Speaker ====
In the 2006 local elections, Shelembe was elected to an ANC council seat in Msunduzi Local Municipality, where he was elected Speaker. During his tenure as Speaker, Msunduzi was bankrupted and placed under administration; amid claims that he was among those responsible for the turmoil, Shelembe was demoted from the Speaker's office in 2010, becoming an ordinary councillor for the rest of the council's term. He was also active in the ANC's Moses Mabhida regional branch in Umgungundlovu: having formerly served as Regional Secretary of the branch, he was elected as Regional Treasurer in August 2008.

==== Deputy Mayor ====
In the 2011 local elections, Shelembe was re-elected as a councillor and was appointed Deputy Mayor of Msunduzi. His appointment was strongly opposed by a group of constituents, some from within the ANC and its Tripartite Alliance partners, who said that the ANC had promised not to re-appoint any of the councillors who had been involved in the municipality's near-collapse in 2010. He was also accused of misconduct in his capacity as ANC Regional Treasurer by ANC members who alleged that he and Super Zuma, then ANC Regional Secretary, had improperly interfered in the process by which the party had selected its election candidates ahead of the 2011 elections.

After Shelembe was sworn in as Deputy Mayor in June, disgruntled ANC members staged extensive protests, calling for his removal; the demonstrations included a weeks-long sit-in at the ANC's regional headquarters and a Tripartite Alliance march through Pietermaritzburg. Makhosi Khoza was among the ANC politicians who called for him to resign. The protests also coincided with Shelembe's arraignment in two separate criminal trials.

On 21 June 2011, after less than a month in office as Deputy Mayor, Shelembe announced that he would retire from the council, although he continued to deny allegations of misconduct. He also resigned as ANC Regional Treasurer.

=== ANC Regional Chair: 2012–2014 ===
Shelembe made a political comeback in March 2012 when he was elected Regional Chairperson of the ANC's Moses Mabhida branch. Mthandeni Dlungwana was elected his deputy on a slate which also included Super Zuma and Thulani Xulu; they defeated an opposing slate backed by Mervyn Dirks and led by Bheki Nzimande, the outgoing Deputy Regional Chairperson. Although Shelembe's election caused some controversy – especially because he was still facing criminal charges – the incumbent ANC Provincial Secretary, Sihle Zikalala, defended him and pointed out that he had never been found guilty of any wrongdoing. Shelembe served only one two-year term in the chairmanship; in 2014, he dropped his re-election bid, leaving Zuma to succeed him unopposed.

=== Criminal charges ===
==== Umgungundlovu property sale ====
On 7 June 2011, shortly after he was sworn in as Deputy Mayor, Shelembe appeared in court in Pietermaritzburg in connection with an allegedly corrupt property deal conducted while he was a councillor at Umgungundlovu District Municipality. Among those charged alongside him were his wife, Joyful; his sister, Nelisiwe; and his former colleague in the Umgungundlovu council, Lucky Moloi. The National Prosecuting Authority (NPA) alleged that, in 2003, Shelembe, Moloi, and another councillor had persuaded the municipality to buy a property at the inflated price of R6.85 million. According to the NPA, they had then received a R1-million commission from the former owners of the property, which they had allegedly shared with four other people, including a property agent and Shelembe's wife and sister.

The NPA charged Shelembe with corruption and fraud, for his role in the property deal and the alleged receipt of R200,000 commission, and with money laundering, for his involvement in distributing the commission. He pled not guilty to all charges. After the trial was postponed several times, Shelembe and his wife were acquitted in March 2013, though Moloi was found guilty of corruption.

==== Moses Mabhida arson attack ====
On 11 June 2011, during the sit-in by disgruntled members, the ANC's Moses Mabhida regional headquarters in Pietermaritzburg were set alight. Themba Dumisani Mabona, who was employed by the ANC as Super Zuma's driver, confessed to committing the arson attack, but claimed that Shelembe had asked him to start the fire in exchange for R500,000 and a full-time job in the ANC's offices. Shelembe was charged with arson in the Pietermaritzburg Regional Court, with prosecutors alleging that Shelembe had intended for the fire to destroy documents, stored in the offices, which could have incriminated regional leaders, in particular by providing evidence of irregularities in the candidate selection process ahead of the 2011 local elections. However, Mabona was the state's only witness against Shelembe and the NPA dropped the arson charge in November 2011.

== Provincial legislature ==
In the 2014 general election, Shelembe was elected to an ANC seat in the KwaZulu-Natal Provincial Legislature, ranked 40th on the ANC's provincial party list. He served only one term in the legislature and did not stand for re-election in the next general election in 2019.

A longtime ally of Zweli Mkhize, in 2017 Shelembe was viewed as the "main foot soldier" in Mkhize's campaign to be elected ANC President at the party's 54th National Conference. Although that campaign was not successful, Shelembe continued to support Mkhize after he resigned from the legislature, and he was among the first to endorse Mkhize's next presidential run in 2022.

== Personal life ==
Shelembe is polygamous and, as of 2011, had three wives. After his father, Bhekinduna L. Shelembe, died in 2005, he and his siblings became engaged in a prolonged feud over control of the EKuphumuleni Nazareth Baptist Church formerly led by Bhekinduna L. Shelembe, especially over control of the assets owned by the church and by Bhekinduna.
