= Tammy Colley =

South African politician

Tammy Colley MPL

Member of the KwaZulu-Natal Legislature
- Incumbent
- Assumed office 14 June 2024

Personal details
- Party: Democratic Alliance
- Profession: Politician

Tamsyn Colley, known as Tammy Colley is a South African politician who has been a member of the KwaZulu-Natal Legislature for the Democratic Alliance since 2024.

Colley had first been elected as the ward councillor for ward 6, centered around the town of Ballito, in the KwaDukuza Local Municipality in 2016. During her tenure on the municipal council, she served on the municipality's economic development and planning portfolio committee, the women's caucus and the local command council (LCC). She was also whip of the DA caucus. By 2024, she was the leader of the DA caucus and a member of the Executive Council of the municipality.

Colley was elected to the provincial legislature in the 2024 provincial election as one of 11 DA members. She subsequently resigned from the KwaDukuza municipal council to take up her seat as an MPL. After being sworn into the provincial legislature, she was appointed the party's provincial spokesperson on sports, arts and culture and public works and infrastructure as well as deputy chief whip of the legislature.
