= Cele (name) =

Cele is a given name and surname. Notable people with the name include:

== Surname ==
- Baby Cele (born 1972), South African actress
- Bheki Cele (born 1952), South African politician
- Clara Germana Cele (1890–1912), South African girl
- Henry Cele (1949–2007), South African actor
- Khalipha Cele (born 1993), South African cricketer
- Mohau Cele (born 1991), South African actress
- Mondli Cele (1989–2016), South African soccer player
- Nondumiso Cele (fl. from 2006), South African politician
- Okuhle Cele (born 1997), South African cricketer
- Phumzile Mbatha-Cele (fl. from 2007), South African politician
- Samkelo Cele (born 1997), South African basketball player
- Sbonelo Cele (born 2001), South African soccer player
- Shakes Cele (died 2020), South African politician
- Siboniso Cele (born 1985), South African canoeist
- Thabo Cele (born 1997), South African footballer
- Zamandosi Cele (born 1990), South African soccer player
- Zibuse Cele (fl. from 2024), South African politician
- Zinhle Cele (fl. from 2019), South African politician

== Given name ==
- Cele Abba (1906–1992), Italian actress
- Cele Dabhaill mac Scannal (858–927), Abbot of Bangor, County Down
- Cele Fierro (fl. from 2023), Argentine politician and activist
- Cele Goldsmith Lalli (1933–2003), American editor
- Cele Hahn (1942–2014), American broadcaster and politician
- Célé Petair (c. 700–758), Abbot of Armagh in Ireland
- Çelë Shabani (c. 1830–1879), Albanian commander
- Cele Vilotic (1925–1989), Yugoslav footballer and manager
