= Mtshali =

Mtshali is a South African surname that may refer to the following notable people:

- Eric Mtshali, South African politician
- Gugu Mtshali, South African politician
- Lindokuhle Mtshali, South African soccer player
- Lionel Mtshali (1935–2015), South African politician
- Oswald Mbuyiseni Mtshali (born 1940), South African poet
- Themba Mtshali, South African politician
- Thembi Mtshali-Jones (born 1949), South African actress
