= Hlobisile Dlamini =

South African politician

Hlobisile Dlamini MPL

Member of the KwaZulu-Natal Provincial Legislature
- Incumbent
- Assumed office 25 November 2020
- In office 18 November 2010 – 7 May 2019

Personal details
- Citizenship: South Africa
- Party: African National Congress
- Relations: Nkosazana Dlamini-Zuma (sister)

Hlobisile Salvatoris Dlamini, also known by her married name Hlobisile Ngxongo, is a South African politician who has represented the African National Congress (ANC) in the KwaZulu-Natal Provincial Legislature since November 2010, excepting a hiatus from May 2019 to November 2020. She is a former Deputy Regional Chairperson of the ANC's Far North branch in Umkhanyakude District in KwaZulu-Natal.

== Family and early career ==
Dlamini is the younger sister of national minister Nkosazana Dlamini-Zuma. In 1999, she appeared in the Durban Regional Court on fraud charges in relation to an amount of R3.8 million, which she and two others were accused of embezzling from the government between 1996 and 1998. She was the director of a company, the Maputoland Women's Organisation, which prosecutors alleged had been used to channel state funds into the personal bank accounts of the co-accused. Dlamini's husband, Sipho Ngxongo, was also arrested and charged in relation to the case. In a prolonged trial, she pled not guilty and was acquitted in 2003.

== Legislative career ==
On 18 November 2010, Dlamini was sworn in to an ANC seat in the KwaZulu-Natal Provincial Legislature, filling a casual vacancy created by the death of John Mchunu the previous month. In the 2014 general election, she was elected to her first full term in the legislature, ranked 33rd on the ANC's provincial party list. In December 2014, she was additionally elected as Deputy Regional Chairperson of the ANC's Far North branch in Umkhanyakude District, serving under Regional Chairperson Bethuel Mthethwa.

In the 2019 general election, she stood for re-election to her legislative seat but was ranked 48th on the ANC's party list and did not initially secure one of the 44 seats won by the ANC. However, she was sworn back in to the legislature on 25 November 2020, filling a casual vacancy arising from the death of Mluleki Ndobe earlier that month.
