= Mafika Mndebele =

South African politician

Mafika Mndebele MPL

Member of the KwaZulu-Natal Legislature
- Incumbent
- Assumed office February 2024

Personal details
- Born: 1 January 1987 (age 39)
- Party: African National Congress

Mafika Damane Mndebele (born 1 January 1987) is a South African politician from KwaZulu-Natal. He has represented the African National Congress (ANC) in the KwaZulu-Natal Legislature since February 2024.

== Early life and career ==
Mthethwa was born on 1 January 1987. He began his political career in the youth wing of the African National Congress (ANC), the ANC Youth League (ANCYL). He was also the national spokesperson of the South African Communist Party's Young Communist League, then led by Buti Manamela.

In 2016, Mndebele was a witness to the assassination of ANC politician Wandile Ngobeni in a bar in Madadeni; Mndebele was shot in the foot in the attack.

When the leadership of the KwaZulu-Natal branch of the ANCYL was disbanded by the league's national leadership in 2021, Mndebele was appointed as coordinator of the interim leadership corps tasked with organising the branch's next elective conference. However, the conference was postponed several times, reportedly because of ferocious infighting btween Mndebele and his cohort, interim leadership convener Sanele Mbambo.

In July 2022, Mndebele graduated from the ANCYL to the Provincial Executive Committee of the mainstream Gauteng ANC; he was elected to his first term on the committee at the party's provincial elective conference that month, and he was also appointed as the party's provincial spokesperson.

== KwaZulu-Natal Legislature: 2024–present ==
In February 2024, Mndebele was sworn into an ANC seat in the KwaZulu-Natal Legislature. He filled the casual vacancy created by the departure of Mervyn Dirks, who had been expelled from the party.

In the next general election in May 2024, he was elected to a full term in the legislature, ranked fourteenth on the ANC's provincial party list. He was also elected as chairperson of the legislature's Portfolio Committee on Economic Affairs and Tourism.

In November 2024, opposition legislators photographed Mndebele sleeping on the parliamentary benches during a speech by provincial minister Francois Rodgers.
