= Vuyiswa Caluza =

South African politician

Vuyiswa Caluza MPL

Member of the KwaZulu-Natal Legislature
- Incumbent
- Assumed office 22 May 2019

Personal details
- Party: African National Congress

Vuyiswa Precious Caluza is a South African politician who has represented the African National Congress (ANC) in the KwaZulu-Natal Legislature since May 2019. Formerly a local councillor in eThekwini Metropolitan Municipality, she is the Deputy Chief Whip of the Majority Party in the legislature.

== Political career ==
Caluza was formerly active in the ANC Youth League. She represented the ANC as a local councillor in eThekwini until the May 2019 general election, when she was elected to a seat in the provincial legislature, ranked 14th on the ANC's provincial party list. At that time, she was also a member of the Regional Executive Committee of the ANC's branch in eThekwini. After being sworn in to the legislature on 22 May 2019, she was appointed Deputy Chief Whip of the Majority Party, the ANC.
