= Chris Pappas (South African politician) =

South African politician (born 1991)

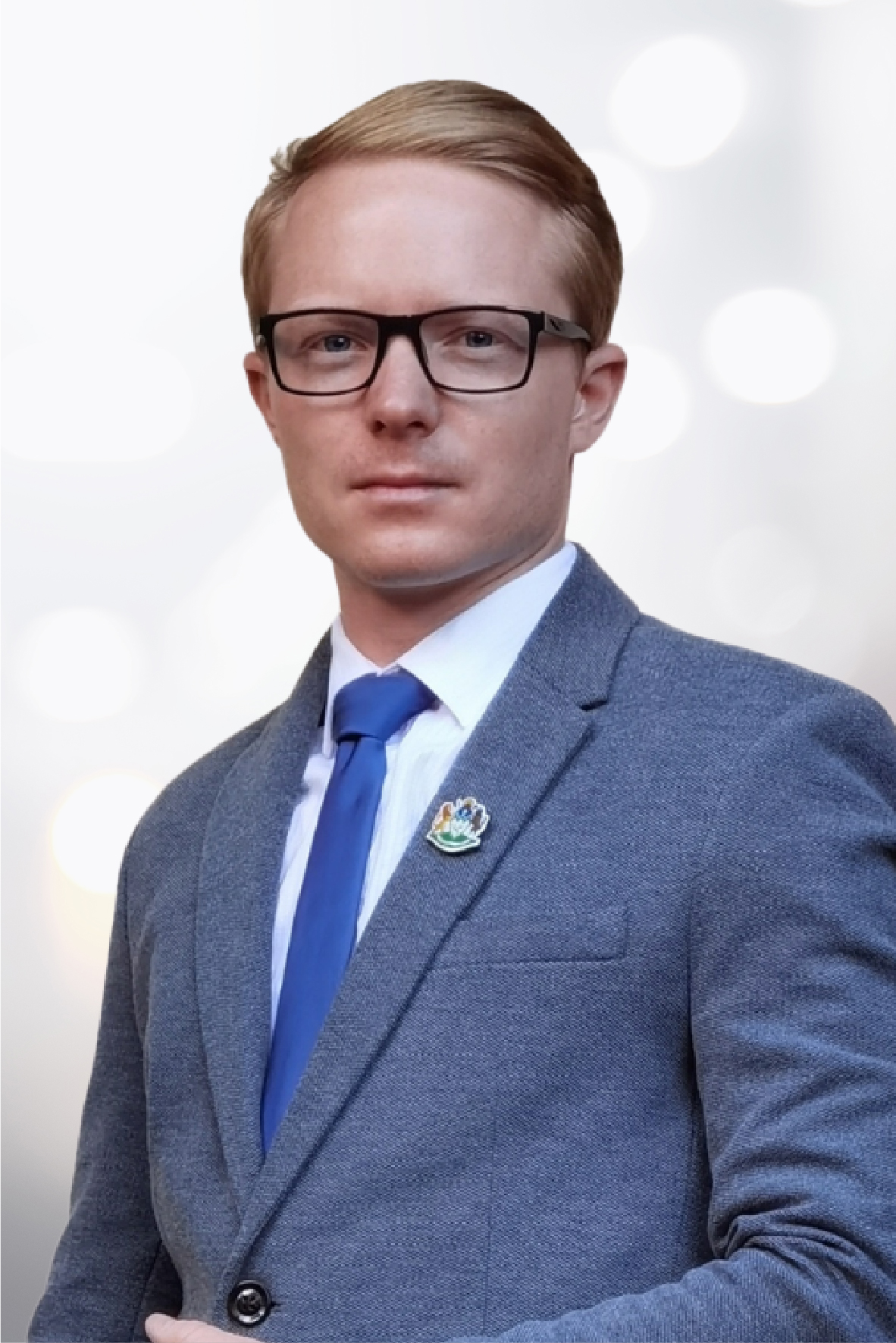
- Pappas in 2021

Mayor of the uMngeni Local Municipality
- Incumbent
- Assumed office 22 November 2021
- Deputy: Sandile Mnikathi
- Preceded by: Sizwe Sokhela

Deputy Provincial Leader of the Democratic Alliance in KwaZulu-Natal
- In office 27 March 2021 – 29 April 2023
- Leader: Francois Rodgers
- Preceded by: Mergan Chetty
- Succeeded by: Sthembiso Ngema

Member of the KwaZulu-Natal Legislature
- In office 22 May 2019 – November 2021
- Succeeded by: Mmabatho Tembe

Personal details
- Born: Christopher John Pappas; 26 August 1991 (age 35) Mooi River, Natal Province, South Africa
- Party: Democratic Alliance (2014–present)
- Other political affiliations: Congress of the People (2010–2013)
- Education: Treverton Preparatory School and College; Hilton College
- Alma mater: University of Pretoria

Christopher John Pappas (born 26 August 1991) is a South African politician who is the mayor of the uMngeni Local Municipality. A member of the Democratic Alliance, he served as party's deputy provincial leader from 2021 until 2023. Pappas served as a member of the eThekwini city council from 2016 until 2019 and as a DA Member of the KwaZulu-Natal Legislature from 2019 to 2021.

In September 2023, Pappas was included on the "TIME100 Next list" by Time magazine. He was his party's candidate for the premiership of KwaZulu-Natal in the country's 2024 election.

== Early life and education ==
Pappas is from Mooi River and has a sister. He attended Treverton Preparatory School and College and then Hilton College, matriculating in 2009. While studying Town and Regional Planning at the University of Pretoria, he was approached by COPE to run for the student representative council under their banner. He agreed and was then elected to the university's SRC. Pappas served as the temporary president of the student body at one stage.

== Career ==
Before going into politics, Pappas worked as a development economist for Urban-Econ. Having joined the Democratic Alliance, he was the party's campaign manager in KwaZulu-Natal for the 2014 general election.

He was elected as the ward councillor for ward 31 in the eThekwini Metropolitan Municipality in 2016. In August 2018, he was criticised for calling the city "dirty and dangerous".

Pappas was elected to the KwaZulu-Natal Legislature in the May 2019 provincial election. He was then appointed as the DA's spokesperson on agriculture.

In January 2021, Pappas was made the party's spokesperson on Cooperative Governance and Traditional Affairs, replacing Mbali Ntuli. On 27 March 2021, he was elected as the Deputy Provincial Leader of the Democratic Alliance in KwaZulu-Natal, defeating Hlengiwe Shozi and Samier Singh.

== Mayor of uMngeni ==
On 11 September 2021, Pappas was announced as the DA's mayoral candidate for the uMngeni Local Municipality ahead of the local government election in November 2021. uMngeni became the first DA majority municipality in KZN, which was accredited to Pappas' "spirited campaign".

On 12 November 2021, the suspended ANC municipal manager Thembeka Cibane tried to preside over the inaugural council meeting. The DA objected to her presiding over the meeting at the Howick-West community hall and refused to participate as it would be illegal. The DA subsequently walked out of the meeting. Pappas and other DA councillors were sworn in at the Howick Magistrate's court later that day. On 17 November, the DA filed court papers to compel the acting municipal manager, Sandile Buthelezi, to call a first council meeting for the municipality's leadership to be elected. The Pietermaritzburg High Court ruled in favour of the DA and ordered Buthelezi to convene a council meeting. On 22 November 2021, Pappas was elected as mayor, becoming the first DA mayor in KwaZulu-Natal. He is the first openly gay man to be elected mayor in the country and across Africa.

In January 2023, Pappas announced that he would be standing down as deputy provincial leader of the DA at the party's provincial conference in April. Outgoing deputy provincial chairman Sthembiso Ngema was elected to succeed him.

On 13 September 2023, Pappas was included on the "2023 TIME100 Next list" by Time magazine.

On 25 September 2023, DA leader John Steenhuisen announced that Pappas would be the party's candidate for Premier of KwaZulu-Natal in the 2024 provincial election. The DA failed to win a majority in the provincial legislature at the election and Pappas then declined to take up a seat in the provincial legislature, opting to remain as mayor.

On 16 April 2026, Pappas announced that he would not be standing for re-election as mayor of uMngeni in the upcoming local government election. He said that he withdrew from the candidate selection process in favour of opportunities in the private sector and denied claims that he withdrew due to tensions between him and the DA's provincial chairperson Dean Macpherson. In late-April 2026, City Press reported that Pappas was weighing re-entering the DA's internal candidate selection process for mayor again. On July 13, Pappas was nominated by the DA for re-election as mayor.

In the municipal election held on 4 November 2026, the DA increased its support in the municipality, receiving just over 60% of the vote. Pappas was sworn in for a second term as mayor on 13 November 2026.

== Personal life ==
Pappas is gay. He speaks Zulu and English fluently.
