= Super Zuma =

South African politician

Super Zuma MPL

Member of the KwaZulu-Natal Executive Council for Agriculture and Rural Development
- In office 7 February 2023 – 14 June 2024
- Premier: Nomusa Dube-Ncube
- Preceded by: Bongi Sithole-Moloi
- Succeeded by: Thembeni kaMadlopha-Mthethwa

Member of the KwaZulu-Natal Provincial Legislature
- Incumbent
- Assumed office 26 September 2018
- In office 21 May 2014 – November 2015

Provincial Secretary of the African National Congress in KwaZulu-Natal
- In office November 2015 – January 2018
- Deputy: Mluleki Ndobe
- Chairperson: Sihle Zikalala
- Preceded by: Sihle Zikalala
- Succeeded by: Mdumiseni Ntuli

Personal details
- Born: Bangokwakhe Madesius Zuma; 1962 (age 63–64) Impendle, Natal province South Africa
- Party: African National Congress

Bangokwakhe Madesius "Super" Zuma (born 1962) is a South African politician and former trade unionist who served as KwaZulu-Natal's Member of the Executive Council (MEC) for Agriculture and Rural Development from February 2023 until June 2024. He has represented the African National Congress (ANC) in the KwaZulu-Natal Provincial Legislature since September 2018, having formerly served in his seat from 2014 to 2015.

Zuma left the provincial legislature in 2015 to become Provincial Secretary of the ANC's KwaZulu-Natal branch, an office he held between 2015 and 2018. He is also a former Provincial Secretary of the National Education, Health and Allied Workers' Union.

== Early life and career ==
Bangokwakhe Madesius Zuma was born in 1962 in Impendle in present-day KwaZulu-Natal, then part of Natal province. He is the third-youngest of four brothers and also has two sisters, and he has been nicknamed "Super" since childhood. He is the nephew of Inkosi Simphiwe Zuma and the uncle of ANC politician Mzi Zuma. He is also indirectly related to former President Jacob Zuma: Simphiwe Zuma's father shared a paternal grandfather with the former President, although they are from different clans.

Zuma chaired a local branch of the African National Congress (ANC) in Natal from 1992 to 1998, and, after the end of apartheid, he served a stint as an ANC local councillor, beginning with the position of Deputy Mayor of the interim Hilton council from 1995. However, he rose to prominence as a trade unionist: he had joined the National Education, Health and Allied Workers' Union (NEHAWU) as a shop steward while working at the University of Zululand. In 2001, he was elected Provincial Secretary of NEHAWU's KwaZulu-Natal branch; he succeeded Bheki Mtolo and remained in the office for about eight years. Simultaneously, he rose through the ranks of the ANC's Moses Mabhida regional branch in Umgungundlovu District,: he was elected Deputy Regional Secretary of the branch in the 2006 and then served as Regional Secretary from 2008 to 2014.

== Political career ==
=== Provincial legislature: 2014–2015 ===
In the 2014 general election, Zuma was elected to an ANC seat in the KwaZulu-Natal Provincial Legislature, ranked 37th on the ANC's provincial party list. In November 2014, he succeeded Alpha Shelembe, his colleague in the provincial legislature, as Regional Chairperson of the Moses Mabhida ANC; he stood unopposed after Shelembe withdrew from the race.

=== ANC Provincial Secretary: 2015–2018 ===
On 8 November 2015, at a party elective conference in Pietermaritzburg, Zuma was elected Provincial Secretary of the ANC's branch in KwaZulu-Natal. He beat Nhlakanipho Ntombela in a vote to take the position. He served under Provincial Chairperson Sihle Zikalala, with Mluleki Ndobe as his deputy. He resigned from the provincial legislature in order to take up the full-time party position, and his seat was taken up by Sihle Zikalala; his ANC Regional Secretary position was taken over by Mthandeni Dlungwane.

For much of his tenure in the secretariat, Zuma and the provincial ANC were occupied with legal battles over the validity of the conference that had elected them, with an opposing ANC faction alleging that the conference had been marred by electoral irregularities. The Pietermaritzburg High Court ultimately nullified the election and in January 2018 the ANC's National Executive Committee disbanded the provincial leadership corps, prematurely ending Zuma's term as Provincial Secretary.

As secretary, Zuma was also known as a "fierce ally" of Jacob Zuma, the incumbent President of South Africa. As the provincial ANC prepared to re-run its leadership elections in 2018, it was reported that the President supported Zuma's bid for re-election as Provincial Secretary. Zuma was initially the only nominee for the secretarial position but, when the elective conference opened in July 2018, Mdumiseni Ntuli, the outgoing provincial spokesperson, was nominated from the floor of the conference by the ANC Youth League. Ntuli won in a vote by a margin of over 200 votes from among about 1,700 delegates.

=== Return to the legislature: 2018–present ===
In the aftermath of the July 2018 elective conference, Ntuli resigned from his seat in the provincial legislature – as Zuma had before him – and, on 26 September 2018, Zuma was sworn back in to the legislature to fill the resulting casual vacancy. He also succeeded Ntuli as Deputy Chief Whip of the Majority Party in the legislature.

In the 2019 general election, he was re-elected to a full term in the provincial legislature, ranked 24th on the ANC's party list. He was named Chief Whip when the legislature was constituted after the election. In July 2022, he was elected to a four-year term as an ordinary member of the KwaZulu-Natal ANC's Provincial Executive Committee. On 7 February 2023, Premier Nomusa Dube-Ncube appointed him to the KwaZulu-Natal Executive Council as Member of the Executive Council (MEC) for Agriculture and Rural Development; he succeeded Bongi Sithole-Moloi in a minor reshuffle occasioned by Sihle ZIkalala's resignation from the legislature.
