= Zinhle Cele =

South African politician

Zinhle Cele MPL

Member of the KwaZulu-Natal Legislature
- Incumbent
- Assumed office 22 May 2019

Personal details
- Party: ANC

Zinhle Lindeka Immaculate Cele is a South African politician who was elected to the KwaZulu-Natal Legislature in the 2019 general election as a member of the African National Congress. In 2020 Cele was elected to chair the Cooperative Governance and Traditional Affairs (Cogta) Portfolio Committee in the provincial legislature.

== Political career ==
Having been ranked 17th on the ANC's list for the KwaZulu-Natal Legislature in the 2019 general election, Cele was elected to her seat as the ANC won 44 out of the 80 seats. She was then appointed to serve on the Conservation and Environment, Public Works, Economic Development and Tourism, and Community Safety and Liaison committees.

In November 2020, Cele was promoted to chairperson of the Cooperative Governance and Traditional Affairs (Cogta) Portfolio Committee after incumbent chairperson Ricardo Mthembu died from COVID-19 in July. Her appointment was welcomed by the Member of the Executive Council for Cooperative Governance and Traditional Affairs, Sipho Hlomuka. In her capacity as chairperson of the Cogta committee, Cele alleged in October 2022 that there was widespread corruption at the Endumeni Local Municipality.

Cele was elected to a four-year term on the ANC Provincial Executive Committee at the party's provincial elective conference in July 2022.
