= Bradley Singh =

South African politician (born 1980)

Bradley Singh MPL

Member of the KwaZulu-Natal Legislature
- Incumbent
- Assumed office 22 May 2019

Personal details
- Born: 20 April 1980 (age 45)
- Party: Democratic Alliance (2014–present)
- Other political affiliations: Minority Front (Before 2014)

Bradley Singh (born 20 April 1980) is a South African politician who has been serving as a Member of the KwaZulu-Natal Legislature since 22 May 2019. He is a member of the Democratic Alliance (DA).

Previously, Singh was an eThekwini ward councillor for the Minority Front (MF) until April 2014, when he joined the DA. A by-election was held in his ward in July 2014, which he won as the DA candidate. He was later re-elected as a ward councillor in August 2016.
