= Mbali Shinga =

South African politician (born 1974)

Mbali Shinga MPL

Member of the KwaZulu-Natal Executive Council for Social Development
- Incumbent
- Assumed office 23 June 2024
- Premier: Thami Ntuli
- Preceded by: Nonhlanhla Khoza

Member of the KwaZulu-Natal Legislature
- Incumbent
- Assumed office 13 October 2021

Personal details
- Born: 13 October 1974 (age 51) Mtwalume, South Africa
- Party: National Freedom Party
- Occupation: Unemployed

Cynthia Mbali Shinga (born 13 October 1974) is a South African politician from KwaZulu-Natal who was serving as the province's Member of the Executive Council (MEC) for Social Development. She has been representing the National Freedom Party (NFP) in the KwaZulu-Natal Legislature since October 2021

Since December 2025, Shinga has been embroiled with a dispute with her political party, and she is currently challenging the outcome of internal disciplinary proceedings which resulted a decision to expel her from the NFP.

== Early life and career ==
Shinga was born on 13 October 1974 in Mtwalume on the South Coast of present-day KwaZulu-Natal. She was the second of ten children; her father was a sugar mill clerk and her mother was a homemaker.

After graduating from high school, she was a service worker—for a period at Spur—working as a dishwasher, waitress, and finally as a restaurant manager. Later she did community work as an employee of loveLife and ran a cleaning service business and internet café.

Shinga also joined the National Freedom Party (NFP) after it was founded in 2011. She was elected as the regional chair of its South Coast branch in 2016 and was elected to its national executive committee in 2021.

== KwaZulu-Natal Legislature: 2021–present ==
In October 2021, Shinga joined the KwaZulu-Natal Legislature, occupying the single seat that the NFP had won in the May 2019 general election. Sworn in on 13 October, she filled the casual vacancy that had been created by the resignation of her predecessor in the seat, Vikizitha Mlotshwa. In 2022, she was also elected to replace Mlotshwa as the NFP's provincial chairperson in KwaZulu-Natal.

In the next general election in May 2024, Shinga, ranked first on the NFP's provincial party list, was again the sole NFP candidate elected to the provincial legislature. On this occasion, however, the NFP's seat was crucial in deciding the coalition that would govern the hung legislature; NFP leader Ivan Barnes ultimately announced that the NFP would support the so-called Government of Provincial Unity proposed by the Inkatha Freedom Party, African National Congress, and Democratic Alliance. Thus, when newly elected Premier Thami Ntuli announced his coalition Executive Council on 18 June 2024, Shinga was named as Member of the Executive Council (MEC) for Social Development.

=== Motion of no confidence: 2025 ===
On 15 December 2025, Shinga voted against a legislative motion of no confidence in Ntuli's leadership. Notwithstanding its participation in the coalition, the NFP's national leadership had resolved to support the motion and vote with the opposition MK Party and Economic Freedom Fighters, but Shinga unilaterally resolved to oppose the motion and support the coalition government. The motion failed to pass.

In the legislative debate on the motion, Shinga said that, "A motion of no confidence should flow from a proper assessment of the performance of a government," and, "True leadership is not in a moment of excitement, but in restraint. This house is not a rally, it is a constitutional place." She later told the Daily Maverick that she viewed the NFP's instruction to support the motion as itself the "personal choice" of NFP national leader Ivan Barnes and felt that Barnes lacked the authority to decide unilaterally to undermine the provincial coalition.

=== Disciplinary proceedings: 2026 ===
In the aftermath of the no-confidence vote, the NFP placed Shinga on immediate suspension and instituted internal disciplinary proceedings against her for openly defying the party's instructions on the motion. In January 2026, while the disciplinary process was pending, the NFP's national leadership formally resolved to withdraw from the coalition government, and it instructed Shinga to resign from her seat in the legislature and Executive Council so that, in line with the closed-list electoral system, she could be replaced with another NFP member. However, Shinga defied that instruction, too, refusing to resign.

In April 2026, the NFP's internal disciplinary committee found Shinga guilty of all charges, including misconduct and gross insubordination. Saying that her open defiance of the party's voting instructions "undermin[ed] collective authority and plac[ed] the party into disrepute," the NFP handed down a sanction of expulsion from the party. Shinga exhausted the internal appeals process at the end of May 2026, when the party's appeals tribunal upheld the disciplinary committee's findings and sanction. Because Shinga was constitutionally required to vacate her party offices upon losing her party membership, the NFP designated its national leader, Barnes, to replace her in the provincial legislature. The Speaker of the KwaZulu-Natal Legislature, Nontembeko Boyce, acknowledged the NFP's decision, saying that Barnes would be sworn in to Shinga's seat unless a court ordered otherwise. Shinga said that she planned to file urgent court papers challenging her expulsion and removal.

== Personal life ==
Shinga has two children.
