= Phumlile =

Phumlile is a given name. Notable people with the name include:

- Phumlile Ndzinisa (born 1992), Swazi athlete
- Phumlile Zulu (fl. from 2005), South African politician
