= Mavuso (surname) =

Mavuso is a surname. Notable people with the name include:

- Busi Mavuso (born 1977 or 1978), South African businesswoman
- John Mavuso (1926–2011), South African politician
- Langa Mavuso (born 1998), South African singer-songwriter
- Mavuso (c. 1820–1868), king of Eswatini
- Meshack Mavuso (born 1977), South African actor
- Nozipho Mavuso, South African politician
