= Thulani Xulu =

South African politician

Thulani Xulu MPL

Member of the KwaZulu-Natal Provincial Legislature
- Incumbent
- Assumed office 22 May 2019

Personal details
- Born: Caluza, Msunduzi; KwaZulu-Natal, South Africa
- Party: African National Congress

Thulani Vincent Xulu is a South African politician who has represented the African National Congress (ANC) in the KwaZulu-Natal Provincial Legislature since 2019. He was formerly a local councillor in Msunduzi Local Municipality.

== Life and career ==
Nicknamed "Two Ways", Xulu was born and raised in Caluza near Edendale in Msunduzi Local Municipality, which falls under KwaZulu-Natal's Umgungundlovu District. He formerly represented the ANC as a local councillor in Msunduzi.

In October 2018, he was appointed the interim head of the ANC's Moses Mabhida regional branch in Umgungundlovu, the party's second-largest branch in KwaZulu-Natal; he was appointed as the convenor of the task team that was formed to lead the branch until it could elect a new leadership. He was viewed as the leader of a regional faction which was opposed to former Moses Mabhida Regional Chairperson Mthandeni Dlungwana and also to former Regional Secretary Mzi Zuma. He led the branch until December 2021, when Mzimkhulu Thebolla, the Mayor of Msunduzi, was elected as the new Regional Chairperson.

While leading the Moses Mabhida branch, Xulu was elected to the KwaZulu-Natal Provincial Legislature in the 2019 general election, ranked 40th on the ANC's party list. In September 2020, there was a minor scandal when the provincial government published its intention to sign a R180-million rental contract with a company owned by Xulu's 28-year-old daughter, Sindile. Another company which had bid on the contract, the Rebosis Property Fund, contracted forensic investigator Paul O'Sullivan to investigate the tender process. The investigation reportedly uncovered that Sindile's company had been registered just three weeks before the tender was advertised, did not own any property, and had submitted a bid about R100-million higher than Rebosis's bid. The opposition Inkatha Freedom Party called for the Xulu to be suspended and investigated, but Xulu said that he had not been aware of or involved in the tender process.
