= Zintle =

Zintle/Zinhle is a South African Nguni name which means "beautiful". Notable people with such names include:

- Zinhle Cele, South African politician
- Zinhle Essamuah, American journalist
- Zintle Mali, South African cricketer
- Zintle Mpupha, South African rugby player and cricketer
- Zintle Alexia Ndlazi, South African politician
- DJ Zinhle (born 1983), South African DJ, producer, media personality
