= Mmabatho Tembe =

South African politician

Mmabatho Tembe MPL
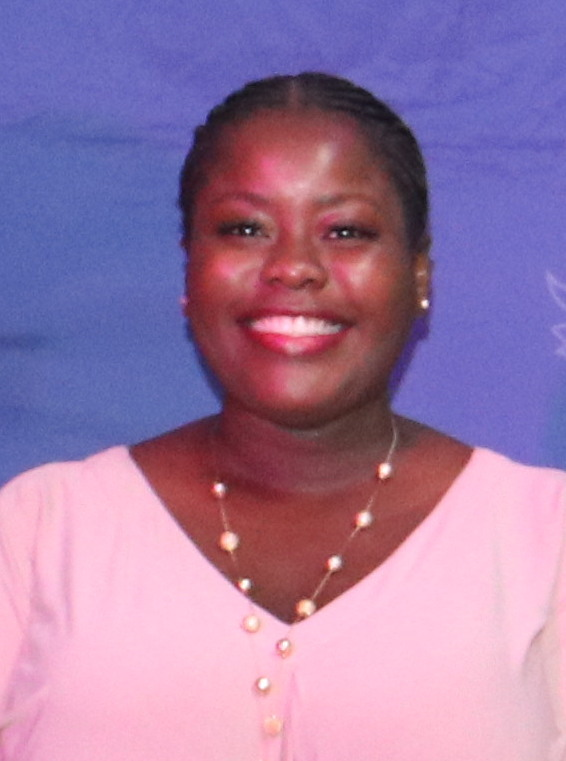
- Tembe in 2024

Deputy Speaker of the KwaZulu-Natal Legislature
- Incumbent
- Assumed office 14 June 2024
- Premier: Thami Ntuli
- Preceded by: Themba Mthembu

Member of the KwaZulu-Natal Provincial Legislature
- Incumbent
- Assumed office 7 December 2021
- Preceded by: Chris Pappas

Personal details
- Born: Durban, South Africa
- Party: Democratic Alliance
- Education: Queensburgh Girls' High School
- Alma mater: University of KwaZulu-Natal
- Profession: Politician

Mmabatho Tembe is a South African politician who has served as the Deputy Speaker of the KwaZulu-Natal Provincial Legislature since June 2024. A member of the Democratic Alliance, she has served in the provincial legislature since December 2021. Tembe had previously served as a councillor in the eThekwini Metropolitan Municipality.

== Early life and education ==
Tembe was born and grew up in Durban. She matriculated from Queensburgh Girls' High School. Tembe graduated from the University of KwaZulu-Natal with a degree in Social Sciences majoring in Psychology and Anthropology before she graduated with an Honours degree in Counseling Psychology. She has also earned a certificate in project management from the University of Cape Town.

== Career ==
Tembe worked as a research assistant to the Deputy Vice Chancellor of the Durban University of Technology. She then became an Academic Development Advisor at the Health Sciences Department of the university.

== Political career ==
Tembe joined the Democratic Alliance branch in Ward 33 in the eThekwini Metropolitan Municipality in 2014. She was appointed secretary of the party's Central Durban constituency.

Tembe was elected a DA councillor in the eThekwini municipality in 2016. During her tenure as a councillor, she served on the economic development committee, before moving to the community safety committee where she was whip for two terms.

On 7 December 2021, Tembe was sworn in as a DA Member of the KwaZulu-Natal Provincial Legislature. She filled the casual vacancy that arose after the resignation of Chris Pappas who was elected mayor of the uMngeni Local Municipality.

During a special sitting of the legislature held on 10 August 2022 to elect a new Premier of KwaZulu-Natal, the DA caucus nominated Tembe to contest the election against the ANC's candidate Nomusa Dube-Ncube. Dube-Ncube defeated Tembe by a margin of 45 to 11 votes.

Tembe was elected deputy speaker of the provincial legislature following the 2024 provincial election.
