= Vusi Dube =

South African politician

Vusi Dube MPL

Member of the KwaZulu-Natal Provincial Legislature

Personal details
- Born: 1952 or 1953 (age 72–73); Sobantu, Pietermaritzburg; Natal, Union of South Africa
- Political party: African National Congress

Emmanuel Vusumuzi Dube (born 1952 or 1953) is a South African politician and Christian minister who has represented the African National Congress (ANC) in the KwaZulu-Natal Provincial Legislature for over a decade. He is also the founder of eThekwini Community Church, a large charismatic church in Durban, and of Community Churches International. He is known as an ally of former president Jacob Zuma.

== Early life and ministry ==
Dube was born in 1952 or 1953 and is from Sobantu, a village outside Pietermaritzburg in KwaZulu-Natal (formerly the Natal province). He was the eldest of three children and his grandfather was an evangelist in the Presbyterian Church.

In 2005, Dube founded an independent charismatic church, the eThekwini Community Church in Durban, with other pastors who broke away from the Durban Christian Centre. Within a decade, the church regularly attracted a congregation of up to 4,000 people. Dube later founded the Community Churches International to service congregations outside eThekwini; by 2011, it had grown to seven branches, and he estimated that it had over 20,000 members in total. His church is affiliated to the National Interfaith Council of South Africa (NICSA), and Dube personally has served as NICSA's co-convenor.

== Political career ==
Dube is a member of the ANC and by 2010 he represented the party in the KwaZulu-Natal Provincial Legislature. He was re-elected to the provincial legislature in the 2014 general election, ranked 20th on the ANC's provincial party list, and in the 2019 general election, ranked 44th on the ANC's party list. He is known as a staunch supporter of former president Jacob Zuma, whom he supported in 2005–2006, when Zuma was first facing corruption charges, and whom he continued to support in 2018, when the corruption charges were revived.

== Personal life ==
He is married to Takalani Dube, who is also a pastor.
