= Mpumelelo Zulu =

South African politician

Mpumelelo Zulu MPL

Member of the KwaZulu-Natal Provincial Legislature
- Incumbent
- Assumed office 26 February 2021

Personal details
- Citizenship: South Africa
- Party: African National Congress

Mpumelelo Amon Zulu is a South African politician who has represented the African National Congress (ANC) in the KwaZulu-Natal Provincial Legislature since 2021. He was ranked 52nd on the ANC's provincial party list in the 2019 general election and did not initially secure election to a legislative seat, but he was sworn in on 26 February 2021 to fill a casual vacancy.

In April 2022, he ran unsuccessfully for election as the Regional Chairperson of the ANC's large Mzala Nxumalo branch in Zululand; he ran on a slate which was viewed as inhospitable to the re-election bid of ANC President Cyril Ramaphosa, and he was defeated by the incumbent, Sbu Mhlongo, a Ramaphosa loyalist.
