= Sithembiso Mshengu =

South African politician

Sithembiso Mshengu MPL

Member of the KwaZulu-Natal Provincial Legislature
- Incumbent
- Assumed office 22 May 2019

Personal details
- Citizenship: South Africa
- Party: African National Congress

Sithembiso Wiseman Mshengu is a South African politician who has represented the African National Congress (ANC) in the KwaZulu-Natal Provincial Legislature since 2019. He was elected to the provincial legislature in the 2019 general election, ranked 35th on the ANC's provincial party list.

Formerly an activist in the ANC Youth League in KwaZulu-Natal, Mshengu rose to prominence as the spokesperson for a group of ANC members who took the party to court and successfully applied for the nullification of the provincial party's December 2015 leadership elections. The group was aligned to Senzo Mchunu, who, during the 2015 elections, had been ousted as ANC Provincial Chairperson by Sihle Zikalala. During this period, as the ANC's 54th National Conference approached, Mshengu was also an outspoken supporter of – and on some accounts an official lobbyist for – Cyril Ramaphosa's campaign to be elected ANC President.
