= Elma Rabe =

South African politician

Elma Rabe MPL

Member of the KwaZulu-Natal Provincial Legislature
- Incumbent
- Assumed office 22 May 2019

Personal details
- Party: Democratic Alliance
- Occupation: Politician

Elma Rabe is a South African politician and a current Member of the KwaZulu-Natal Provincial Legislature for the Democratic Alliance.

== Political career ==
Rabe had previously served as the DA's Provincial Director in the KwaZulu-Natal before she was elected to the KwaZulu-Natal Provincial Legislature in the 2019 provincial election, having been ranked 10th on the party list. She was appointed the DA KZN Spokesperson on Social Development. She supported fellow MPL Mbali Ntuli's unsuccessful bid for DA leader at the 2020 Democratic Alliance Federal Congress.

At the DA's provincial congress held on 27 March 2021, Rabe was elected as one of three deputy provincial chairpersons of the party. She was appointed the party's provincial spokesperson on agriculture in December 2021.

Rabe unsuccessfully stood for re-election as a deputy provincial chairperson of the DA at the party's provincial conference in April 2023.
