= Marlaine Nair =

South African politician

Marlaine Nair MPL

Member of the KwaZulu-Natal Legislature
- Incumbent
- Assumed office 5 April 2022
- Preceded by: Mbali Ntuli

Personal details
- Party: Democratic Alliance
- Profession: Politician

Marlaine Nair is a South African politician. A member of the Democratic Alliance, she has been a member of the KwaZulu-Natal Legislature since 2022, and has served as the Chairperson of the KwaZulu-Natal Provincial Legislature COGTA Portfolio Committee since 2024. She is a former DA eThekwini Councillor.

== Political career ==
Nair served as a Democratic Alliance councillor of the eThekwini Metropolitan Municipality. She has been a member of the DA's Federal Legal Commission, the party's Provincial Management Committee, the DA's Provincial Executive Committee as well as the party's provincial finance committee. She was also the party's provincial fundraiser.

On 5 April 2022, Nair was sworn in as a member of the KwaZulu-Natal Legislature. She replaced former DA MPL Mbali Ntuli who had resigned from the party a month earlier. She was appointed the DA's spokesperson on human settlements. Nair was re-elected following the 2024 provincial election and was elected as the Chairperson of the KwaZulu-Natal Provincial Legislature Cogta Portfolio Committee since 2024.
