= Nhlakanipho Ntombela =

South African politician

Nhlakanipho Ntombela MPL

Member of the KwaZulu-Natal Provincial Legislature

Personal details
- Citizenship: South Africa
- Political party: African National Congress

Nhlakanipho Ntombela is a South African politician who has represented the African National Congress (ANC) in the KwaZulu-Natal Provincial Legislature since before 2014. He is also a longstanding member of the Provincial Executive Committee of the KwaZulu-Natal ANC, and in December 2021 he was elected Deputy Regional Chairperson of the ANC's Moses Mabhida branch in Umgungundlovu District.

== Political career ==
Ntombela was formerly the Provincial Chairperson of the ANC Youth League in KwaZulu-Natal. He is also a longstanding member of the Provincial Executive Committee of the ANC's KwaZulu-Natal branch: he had a seat in the committee by 2006, and the committee appointed him provincial head of campaigns ahead of the 2011 local elections. In March 2012, he stood for election as Regional Chairperson of the ANC's eThekwini region, the ANC's largest branch in the country, but he was narrowly defeated by Sibongiseni Dhlomo, won received 277 votes to Ntombela's 242.

Ntombela was a Member of the Provincial Legislature prior to 2014, and in the 2014 general election he was re-elected to his seat, ranked 26th on the ANC's provincial party list. In November 2015, he stood unsuccessfully for election as Provincial Secretary of the KwaZulu-Natal ANC; he ran on a slate aligned to outgoing Provincial Chairperson Senzo Mchunu, and he was defeated by Super Zuma. Ahead of the ANC's 54th National Conference two years later, according to IOL, he was a "key backer and lobbyist" of Cyril Ramaphosa's successful campaign to be elected ANC President.

At the ANC's next provincial elective conference in July 2018, Ntombela was re-elected to the ANC Provincial Executive Committee, and in the 2019 general election he was re-elected to his legislative seat, ranked 13th on the ANC's party list. In July 2020, he was appointed as official spokesperson of the KwaZulu-Natal ANC, succeeding Ricardo Mthembu, who had died of COVID-19 complications earlier that month. In December 2021, Ntombela was elected Deputy Regional Chairperson of the ANC's Moses Mabhida branch in Umgungundlovu District, the party's second largest branch in KwaZulu-Natal; in that capacity he served under Regional Chairperson Mzimkhulu Thebolla. He was re-elected to another four-year term on the ANC's Provincial Executive Committee in July 2022.
