= Themba Mthembu =

South African politician

Themba Mthembu MPL

Member of the KwaZulu-Natal Provincial Legislature
- In office 6 May 2009 – 28 May 2024

Member of the KwaZulu-Natal Executive Council for Agriculture and Rural Development
- In office 8 June 2016 – May 2019
- Premier: Willies Mchunu
- Preceded by: Cyril Xaba
- Succeeded by: Bongi Sithole-Moloi

Personal details
- Born: 1958 (age 67–68) Inanda, Natal; Union of South Africa
- Party: African National Congress
- Other political affiliations: South African Communist Party

Richard Themba Mthembu (born 1958) is a South African politician who represented the African National Congress in the KwaZulu-Natal Provincial Legislature from 2009 until 2024. He was formerly KwaZulu-Natal's Member of the Executive Council for Agriculture and Rural Development from June 2016 to May 2019. He has also served as Provincial Secretary of the South African Communist Party in KwaZulu-Natal since 2002.

== Early life and career ==
Mthembu was born in 1958 in Inanda in present-day KwaZulu-Natal (then Natal province). His mother was a domestic worker and his father was a dock worker. He went to school in KwaMashu and then qualified as a chemical engineering technician at the Mangosuthu University of Technology; while a student, he was active in anti-apartheid youth politics. He became active in the trade union movement through the National Education, Health and Allied Workers' Union, which he joined while working in the private sector as an engineering technician. He also became active in the African National Congress (ANC) after it was unbanned in 1990.

== Political career ==
In 2002, Mthembu was elected Provincial Secretary of the KwaZulu-Natal branch of the South African Communist Party (SACP), the ANC's close ally. Pursuant to the 2009 general election, he was elected to an ANC seat in the KwaZulu-Natal Provincial Legislature, ranked 33rd on the ANC's provincial party list. He left his private-sector job to take up the seat, which he held in parallel with his SACP office. In the 2014 general election, he was re-elected to his legislative seat, ranked 32nd on the ANC's party list. Over the next two years, he was highly critical of the KwaZulu-Natal ANC, particularly in connection with an ongoing campaign to unseat Senzo Mchunu as Premier of KwaZulu-Natal.

=== Executive Council: 2016–2019 ===
When Mchunu was finally removed as Premier in May 2016, he was replaced by Willies Mchunu, who, shortly after taking office, announced a cabinet reshuffle in which Mthembu was appointed to the KwaZulu-Natal Executive Council as Member of the Executive Council (MEC) for Agriculture and Rural Development. Although Mthembu's appointment was viewed as an attempt to appease the SACP, the SACP was critical of the move, saying that it had not been consulted before the reshuffle was announced. Mthembu asked to be given 24 hours to consider the promotion, but ultimately, with the SACP's endorsement, accepted; he was sworn in as MEC on 8 June 2016, a day after the other new MECs.

While Mthembu was serving as MEC, his ongoing support for Jacob Zuma, the incumbent President of South Africa, became a source of political tension, especially as the SACP grew increasingly critical of Zuma. In May 2018, Mthembu caused controversy by inviting Zuma to be his special guest during his budget vote speech in the provincial legislature; opposition legislators staged a walkout in protest of Zuma's presence. Mthembu's closeness with Zuma reportedly strained his relationship with Blade Nzimande, the incumbent national General Secretary of the SACP and formerly a key ally of Mthembu's; Nzimande had been fired from Zuma's cabinet in late 2017. It was also reported that Mthembu was likely to face a serious challenge to his incumbency as SACP Provincial Secretary. However, when the SACP's next provincial elective conference was held in Pongola in August 2018, he was re-elected unopposed, as was the incumbent Provincial Chairperson James Nxumalo.

=== Presiding officer: 2019–present ===
In the 2019 general election, Mthembu was re-elected to his seat in the provincial legislature, ranked 38th on the ANC's party list. However, he was not re-appointed to the Executive Council under newly elected Premier Sihle Zikalala. Instead, he was elected Chairperson of Committees in the legislature.

In November 2020, he was elected Deputy Speaker of the KwaZulu-Natal Provincial Legislature, serving under Speaker Ntobeko Boyce; he succeeded Mluleki Ndobe, who had died earlier that month, and he was succeeded as Chairperson of Committees by Siboniso Duma. Ahead of the SACP's next provincial elective conference in May 2022, Mthembu's re-election bid was not expected to face any significant opposition.
