= Mondli Chiliza =

South African politician

Mondli Chiliza MPL

Member of the KwaZulu-Natal Provincial Legislature
- Incumbent
- Assumed office 22 May 2019

Mayor of Ugu
- In office 29 March 2017 – 22 May 2019
- Preceded by: Tolomane Mnyayiza
- Succeeded by: Sizwe Ngcobo

Personal details
- Citizenship: South Africa
- Party: African National Congress

Mondli Abednego Chiliza is a South African politician who has been representing the African National Congress (ANC) in the KwaZulu-Natal Provincial Legislature since 2019. He was formerly the Mayor of Ugu District Municipality from 2017 to 2019, and in April 2022 he was elected as Regional Chairperson of the ANC's Lower South Coast branch in KwaZulu-Natal.

== Political career ==
Chiliza was Deputy Mayor of Ugu under Mayor Tolomane Mnyayiza, who died in December 2016; Chiliza was elected to succeed him on 29 March 2017. Later that year, he reportedly supported Nkosazana Dlamini-Zuma's unsuccessful bid to be elected ANC President at the party's 54th National Conference.

He remained in the mayoral office until the 2019 general election, when he was elected to a seat in the KwaZulu-Natal Provincial Legislature, ranked 31st on the ANC's provincial party list. He was succeeded as Mayor by Sizwe Ngcobo.

On 3 April 2022, at a party elective conference, Chiliza was elected Regional Chairperson of the ANC's Lower South Coast regional branch, beating Phumlile Mthiyane, the incumbent Mayor of Ugu, in a vote. He and his new deputy, Skhumbuzo "Zero" Mqadi, denied rumours that they were politically aligned to former ANC President Jacob Zuma and ANC presidential candidate Zweli Mkhize.

== Personal life ==
Chiliza's 13-year-old daughter died in April 2022, the same week that he was elected ANC Regional Chairperson; she was reportedly struck by lightning.
