= Heinz de Boer =

South African politician

Heinz de Boer MPL

Member of the KwaZulu-Natal Legislature
- Incumbent
- Assumed office 22 May 2019

Personal details
- Born: Heinz Ulrik de Boer
- Party: Democratic Alliance
- Profession: Politician

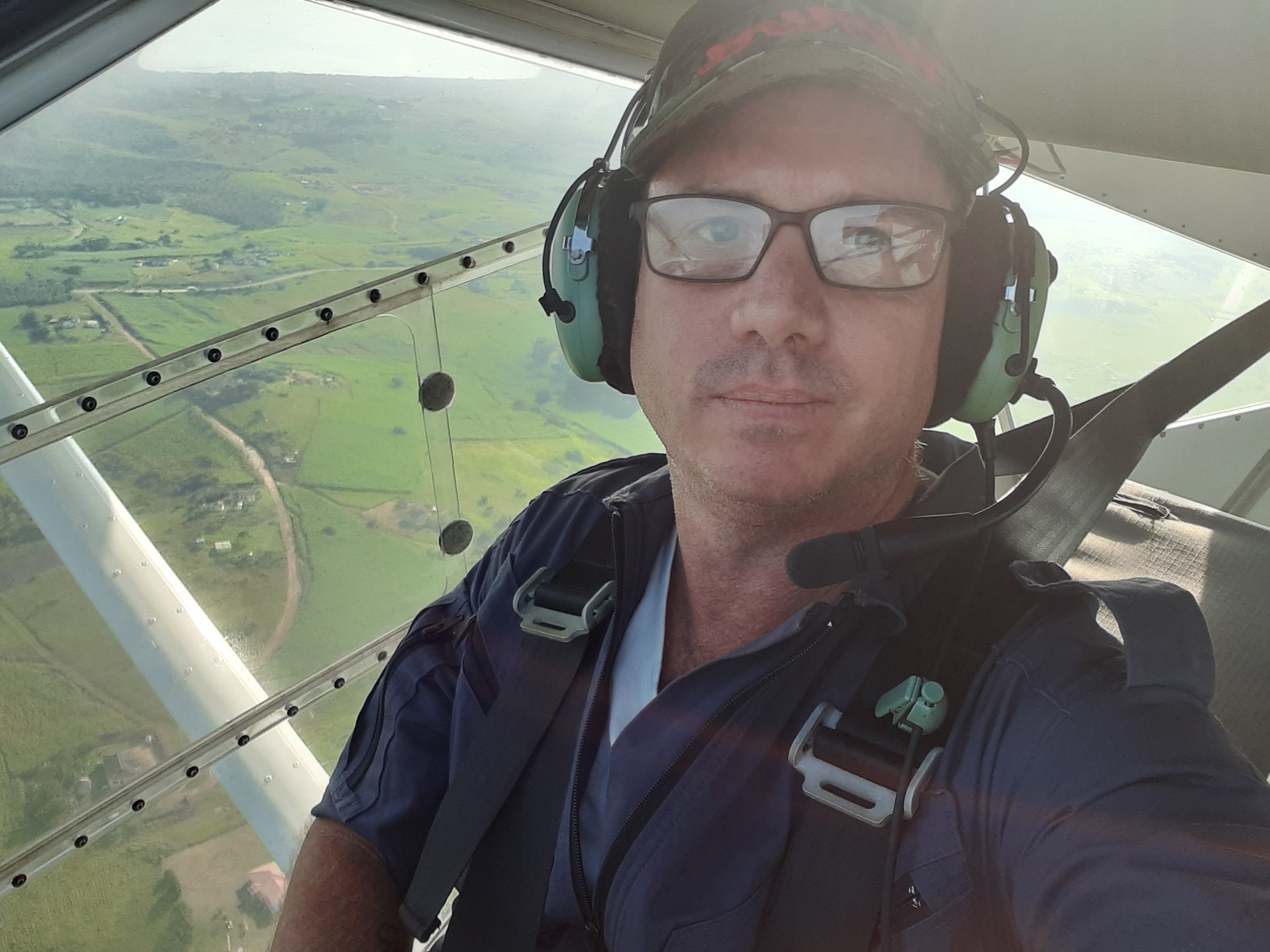
A picture of Heinz de Boer piloting an Aeroprakt AP22

Heinz Ulrik de Boer is a South African journalist and politician who has been a Member of the KwaZulu-Natal Legislature since May 2019. A member of the Democratic Alliance, he was previously the ward councillor for Umhlanga in the eThekwini Metropolitan Municipality.

== Career ==
De Boer worked for Daily News until May 2009, when he resigned to contest a by-election in Umhlanga as the Democratic Alliance candidate. He won the by-election in June 2009. He won a full term in 2011 and was re-elected in 2016.

On 20 March 2018, he was elected deputy caucus leader of the DA. He resigned from the post on 3 April 2018 after serving less than two weeks.

Following the 2019 provincial election, he was promoted to the KwaZulu-Natal Legislature. DA caucus leader Zwakele Mncwango appointed him the party's spokesperson on economic development, tourism and environmental affairs.
