= Lusiwe Ngubane =

South African politician

Lusiwe Ngubane MPL

Member of the KwaZulu-Natal Provincial Legislature
- Incumbent
- Assumed office 22 May 2019

Personal details
- Citizenship: South Africa
- Party: African National Congress

Lusiwe Daureen Ngubane is a South African politician who has represented the African National Congress (ANC) in the KwaZulu-Natal Provincial Legislature since 2019. She was elected to the provincial legislature in the 2019 general election, ranked 47th on the ANC's provincial party list. She is a member of the ANC's Inkosi Bhambatha branch in Umzinyathi, where she formerly served on the Regional Executive Committee.
