= Phumlile Zulu =

South African politician

Phumlile Zulu MPL

Member of the KwaZulu-Natal Provincial Legislature
- Incumbent
- Assumed office 26 February 2021

Personal details
- Citizenship: South Africa
- Party: African National Congress

Rejoice Zibuyisile Phumlile Zulu is a South African politician who has represented the African National Congress (ANC) in the KwaZulu-Natal Provincial Legislature since February 2021. She was formerly a local councillor and Speaker in KwaDukuza Local Municipality between 2016 and 2021. She was the ANC's mayoral candidate for KwaDukuza in 2019 and 2020 but was blocked from the mayoral office by members of her own party.

== Early life and career ==
Zulu matriculated in 2005 and began work as an HIV/AIDS coordinator. She subsequently worked for ten years in the KwaDukuza District Municipality as the municipality's youth development officer. She was a member of the ANC and was elected to the Provincial Executive Committee of the party's KwaZulu-Natal branch in 2015.

== KwaDukuza Speaker ==
In the 2016 local government elections, Zulu was elected to represent the ANC as a councillor in the KwaDukuza municipal council, and in August she was elected as the council's Speaker, serving under longstanding Mayor Ricardo Mthembu. Mthembu resigned from the mayoral office after the 2019 general election and the provincial leadership of the ANC selected Zulu as the party's candidate to replace him. However, Zulu's opponents inside her party repeatedly defied the ANC's instruction to elect Zulu as mayor; members of the ANC caucus in the council boycotted several council meetings in order to render them inquorate so that the mayoral vote could not proceed. In October 2020 the ANC abandoned its attempt to have Zulu elected and Dolly Govender, KwaDukuza's Deputy Mayor, was sworn in as Mayor instead.

== Provincial legislature ==
During the 2019 general election, Zulu had stood as a candidate for election to the KwaZulu-Natal Provincial Legislature, but she had been ranked 53rd on the ANC's provincial party list and had not initially secured election to a seat. In early 2021, however, the ANC announced that she would leave the KwaDukuza council to fill a casual vacancy in the provincial legislature. She was sworn in on 26 February.
