= Nhlakanipho =

Nhlakanipho is a masculine given name. Notable people with the name include:

- Nhlakanipho Ntombela, South African politician
- Nhlakanipho Ntuli (born 1996), South African soccer player
