= Ndodephethe Mthethwa =

South African politician

Ndodephethe Mthethwa MPL

Member of the KwaZulu-Natal Provincial Legislature
- Incumbent
- Assumed office 22 May 2019

Personal details
- Citizenship: South Africa
- Party: African National Congress

Ndodephethe Bethuel Mthethwa is a South African politician who has represented the African National Congress (ANC) in the KwaZulu-Natal Provincial Legislature since 2019. He was formerly the Mayor of Jozini Local Municipality.

== Political career ==
Mthethwa was the Mayor of Jozini until the 2016 local government elections. In the elections, Mthethwa was re-elected as a local councillor and was nominated as the ANC's mayoral candidate, but the ANC failed to gain a plurality of seats. In September 2016, after weeks of deadlock, he was replaced as Mayor by Delani Mabika of the opposition Inkatha Freedom Party. He is also a former Regional Chairperson of the ANC's Far North branch in Umkhanyakude District. He was installed in that office by 2014 and was re-elected in 2018, but in September 2021 his re-election bid was defeated by Siphile Mdaka.

He was elected to the provincial legislature in the 2019 general election, ranked 33rd on the ANC's provincial party list. In July 2022, he was additionally elected to a four-year term on the Provincial Executive Committee of the ANC's KwaZulu-Natal branch.
