= Gugu Mtshali =

South African politician (born 1975)

Gugu Mtshali MPL

Member of the KwaZulu-Natal Provincial Legislature
- Incumbent
- Assumed office 22 May 2019

Personal details
- Born: 11 November 1975 (age 50)
- Citizenship: South Africa
- Party: Economic Freedom Fighters

Gugu Flora Mtshali (born 11 November 1975) is a South African politician who has represented the Economic Freedom Fighters (EFF) in the KwaZulu-Natal Provincial Legislature since 2019. She was elected in the 2019 general election, ranked sixth on the EFF's provincial party list.
