= Nomagugu Simelane =

South African lawyer and politician (born 1976)

Nomagugu Simelane MPL

KwaZulu-Natal MEC for Health
- Incumbent
- Assumed office 27 May 2019
- Premier: Thami Ntuli; Nomusa Dube-Ncube; Sihle Zikalala
- Preceded by: Sibongiseni Dhlomo

Member of the KwaZulu-Natal Legislature
- Incumbent
- Assumed office 21 May 2014

Deputy Provincial Chairperson of the African National Congress
- Incumbent
- Assumed office 23 July 2022
- Preceded by: Willies Mchunu

Personal details
- Born: Nomagugu Simelane; 22 August 1976 (age 50) Dobsonville, Johannesburg, Transvaal Province, South Africa
- Party: African National Congress
- Spouse(s): Sifiso Mngadi (m. 2024) Mxolisi Zulu (divorced)
- Education: University of Natal
- Profession: Lawyer; Politician

Nomagugu Simelane (born 22 August 1976) is a South African lawyer and African National Congress (ANC) politician who has been serving as the KwaZulu-Natal MEC (Member of the Executive Council) for Health since May 2019. She became a Member of the KwaZulu-Natal Legislature in May 2014. She was the chair of the legislature's Agriculture Portfolio Committee from 2014 to 2019. Simelane was previously involved in the African National Congress Youth League (ANCYL).

== Early life and education ==
Nomagugu Simelane was born on 22 August 1976 in Dobsonville, Johannesburg, in the former Transvaal Province. She obtained a BA degree in law and then an LLB degree from the University of Natal, now the University of KwaZulu-Natal. She holds a certificate in Governance from the University of the Witwatersrand. Simelane-Zulu is currently studying towards a master's degree in political science.

== Political career ==
Simelane joined the ANCYL at the age of 16 in 1992 and was branch treasurer of the youth league in Dobsonville from 1992 to 1993. While studying at the University of Natal's Pietermaritzburg campus, she was chair of the South African Students Congress from 1997 to 1998. She was then chairperson of the university's ANC Youth League branch from 1999 until 2001. She was the secretary of the university's Law Student Society from 1999 to 2000.

Simelane later became chairperson of the Black Lawyers Association at the university and was in the post from 2000 to 2001. She was branch secretary from 2002 to 2004.

She was the provincial treasurer of the ANC Youth League from 2003 to 2010. From 2010 until 2011, she was the regional treasurer of the ANC's Abaqulusi branch. She was elected regional chairperson and served in the post from 2011 to 2014. She was elected a member of the ANC Provincial Executive Committee in 2015.

Simelane was elected as an MPL in May 2014 and was the chairperson of the legislature's Agriculture Committee until 2019. Premier Sihle Zikalala appointed her as MEC for Health in May 2019.

In September 2021, Simelane issued a public apology after she and her guests defied COVID-19 regulations during a surprise birthday party for her in August. The Democratic Alliance in KwaZulu-Natal laid criminal charges against her.

Prior to the ANC's provincial elective conference, the ANC in the eThekwini region, the party's largest region in KwaZulu-Natal, endorsed Simelane campaign for deputy provincial chairperson. She was on ANC MPL and candidate for provincial chairperson, Siboniso Duma's "Taliban" slate, a group of candidates allied to former president Jacob Zuma. On 23 July 2022, Simelane-Zulu was elected as the deputy provincial chairperson of the ANC, defeating Education MEC Kwazi Mshengu in a vote that went 927–661 as the "Taliban" slate made a clean sweep of all the provincial leadership positions.

Zikalala resigned as premier on 5 August 2022 and Finance MEC Nomusa Dube-Ncube was elected to replace him. On 11 August 2022, Dube-Ncube appointed her executive council, in which Simelane-Zulu remains as the MEC for Health.

The ANC's support in KwaZulu-Natal declined significantly in the 2024 provincial election, dropping from first-place to third in terms of electoral support. Simelane-Zulu was, however, re-elected to her seat in the provincial legislature. The newly elected premier Thami Ntuli of the Inkatha Freedom Party formed a coalition with the ANC, the Democratic Alliance, and the National Freedom Party which saw Simelane-Zulu reappointed as MEC for Health in the provincial Executive Council.

== Personal life ==
Simelane was married to Mxolisi Zulu. She married eThekwini ward councillor Sifiso Mngadi in December 2024. She resides in Newcastle, KwaZulu-Natal.

Political offices
Preceded by Sibongiseni Dhlomo	KwaZulu-Natal MEC for Health; 27 May 2019 – present	Incumbent
