= Sharon Hoosen =

South African politician

Sharon Hoosen MPL

Member of the KwaZulu-Natal Provincial Legislature
- Incumbent
- Assumed office 2018

Personal details
- Party: Democratic Alliance
- Spouse: Haniff Hoosen
- Occupation: Politician

Sharon Hoosen (née Chetty) is a South African politician who has been a member of the KwaZulu-Natal Provincial Legislature since 2018, representing the Democratic Alliance.

== Life and career ==
Hoosen had formerly served as a DA councillor in the eThekwini Metropolitan Municipality where she was chief whip of the DA caucus. In June 2018, she was removed as chief whip and Thabani Mthethwa was appointed to replace, in preparation for her move to the KwaZulu-Natal Provincial Legislature. She was elected to a full term in the provincial legislature in 2019. DA caucus leader Zwakele Mncwango appointed Hoosen as the party's spokeswoman on Community Safety & Liaison and Transport.

Hoosen is married to DA MP Haniff Hoosen. Prior to the 2011 local government elections, Errol Walters, who served on the DA's Electoral College, alleged that the party was "rife with nepotism and cronyism" due to the "parachuting" of Hoosen as a party candidate in Chatsworth, where her husband had served as constituency head. The DA provincial leader, Sizwe Mchunu, denied the allegation.
