= Thembeni Mthethwa =

South African politician (born 1960)

Thembeni Mthethwa MPL

Member of the KwaZulu-Natal Executive Council for Agriculture and Rural Development
- Incumbent
- Assumed office 23 June 2024
- Premier: Thami Ntuli
- Preceded by: Super Zuma

Personal details
- Born: 6 January 1960 (age 66)
- Party: Inkatha Freedom Party

Thembeni Petty kaMadlopha-Mthethwa (born 6 January 1980) is a South African politician from KwaZulu-Natal. A member of the Inkatha Freedom Party (IFP), she is Member of the Executive Council (MEC) for Agriculture and Rural Development in KwaZulu-Natal.

== Life and career ==
Mthethwa was born on 6 January 1960. Before joining the provincial legislature, she was the mayor of Jozini in KwaZulu-Natal. She has since represented the IFP in the KwaZulu-Natal Legislature over several consecutive parliamentary terms, gaining election in May 2014 and May 2019.

At the IFP's 35th National General Conference in August 2019, Mthethwa was elected as deputy national chairperson of the IFP, serving under national chairperson Blessed Gwala.

In the next general election in May 2024, Mthethwa was re-elected to the provincial legislature, ranked third on the IFP's provincial party list. Announcing his coalition Executive Council on 18 June 2024, Premier Thami Ntuli named Mthethwa as Member of the Executive Council (MEC) for Agriculture and Rural Development. She also served as acting Premier of KwaZulu-Natal in September 2024 while Ntuli and other senior members of the government attended Climate Week NYC.
