= Bridget Ntshangase =

South African politician (died 2021)

Member of the KwaZulu-Natal Provincial Legislature
- In office 22 May 2019 – 31 January 2021

Personal details
- Citizenship: South Africa
- Party: African National Congress

Bridget Nompumelelo "Mpume" Ntshangase (died 31 January 2021) was a South African politician who represented the African National Congress (ANC) in the KwaZulu-Natal Provincial Legislature from May 2019 until her death in January 2021. Formerly a local councillor in eThekwini Metropolitan Municipality, she was Chief Whip of the Majority Party in the provincial legislature at the time of her death.

== Life and career ==
Ntshangase was formerly the Regional Treasurer of the ANC Youth League's eThekwini branch, and she served in the regional executive committee of the ANC Women's League in eThekwini. She was also a longstanding member of the Regional Executive Committee of the mainstream ANC in the region.

She represented the ANC as a local councillor in eThekwini Metropolitan Municipality until the 2019 general election, when she was elected to an ANC seat in the provincial legislature, ranked 41st on the ANC's provincial party list. She was appointed Chief Whip of the Majority Party in the legislature. She died on 31 January 2021 of COVID-19-related illness.
