= Themba Mtshali =

South African politician

Themba Mtshali MPL

Member of the KwaZulu-Natal Provincial Legislature
- Incumbent
- Assumed office 17 July 2019

Personal details
- Citizenship: South Africa
- Party: African National Congress

Themba Sibonelo Mtshali is a South African politician who has represented the African National Congress (ANC) in the KwaZulu-Natal Provincial Legislature since 2019. He was ranked 46th on the ANC's provincial party list in the 2019 general election and did not initially secure election to one of the ANC's 44 seats in the legislature; however, he was sworn in shortly after the election, on 17 July 2019, when a casual vacancy arose due to the resignation of Mthandeni Dlungwane.
