= Nozipho Mavuso =

South African politician

Nozipho Mavuso MPL

Member of the KwaZulu-Natal Provincial Legislature
- Incumbent
- Assumed office 22 May 2019

Personal details
- Citizenship: South Africa
- Party: African National Congress

Nozipho Phillistasia Funaziphi Mavuso is a South African politician who has represented the African National Congress (ANC) in the KwaZulu-Natal Provincial Legislature since 2019. She was elected to the provincial legislature in the 2019 general election, ranked 45th on the ANC's provincial party list. She also stood as a candidate in the 2014 general election but on that occasion was ranked 71st on the ANC's party list and did not secure election to a seat. She was formerly the Deputy Regional Secretary of the ANC's Abaqulusi branch.
