= Mthandeni Dlungwana =

South African politician (born 1976)

Member of the KwaZulu-Natal Provincial Legislature
- In office 14 September 2011 – 15 July 2019

Member of the KwaZulu-Natal Executive Council for Education
- In office June 2016 – May 2019
- Premier: Willies Mchunu
- Preceded by: Peggy Nkonyeni
- Succeeded by: Kwazi Mshengu

Personal details
- Born: January 1976 (age 50) eNqabeni, KwaNxamalala; Natal Province, South Africa
- Party: African National Congress

Mthandeni Eric Dlungwana (born January 1976), also spelled Dlungwane, is a South African politician who represented the African National Congress (ANC) in the KwaZulu-Natal Provincial Legislature between 2011 and 2019. He was formerly KwaZulu-Natal's Member of the Executive Council (MEC) for Education from 2016 to 2019 under Premier Willies Mchunu.

Dlungwana was the Provincial Chairperson of the ANC Youth League in KwaZulu-Natal from May 2010 until October 2011, when his leadership corps was disbanded by the national league after he fell out with league president Julius Malema. He is also a former Regional Chairperson of the ANC's Musa Dladla branch in Umgungundlovu District. He was dismissed from the KwaZulu-Natal Executive Council after the 2019 general election and he resigned from the legislature shortly afterwards in July 2019.

== Early life and career ==
Dlungwana was born in rural eNqabeni in KwaNxamalala, Embubu[[Msunduzi Local Municipality [Pietermaritzburg]] in present-day KwaZulu-Natal, then the Natal province. His mother was a domestic worker and his father was a bus driver; Dlungwana became politically active under the influence of his father, who was a member of the United Democratic Front and Congress of South African Trade Unions.

In 2004, Dlungwana completed a Master's degree in development studies and town planning at the University of KwaZulu-Natal. He was a local leader in the African National Congress (ANC), chairing his local branch of the party between 2001 and 2010.

== Provincial ANC Youth League: 2010–2011 ==
He rose to political prominence during his tenure as Provincial Chairperson of the KwaZulu-Natal branch of the ANC Youth League (ANCYL). He formerly served as ANCYL Deputy Provincial Chairperson under Mxolisi Kaunda from 2008 to 2010, and he succeeded Kaunda as chair at a league elective conference held at the University of KwaZulu-Natal in late May 2010. He defeated Nomagugu Simelane-Zulu in the election and stood as part of a slate of candidates led by Provincial Secretary Bheki Mtolo, all of whom were elected to top leadership positions; the slate also included Yolanda Young, Siboniso Duma, and, as Dlungwana's deputy, Sindiso Magaqa. After the election results were announced, opponents of Dlungwana's slate staged a walkout from the conference, claiming that there had been electoral irregularities.

Dlungwana was initially an outspoken supporter of Julius Malema, the incumbent President of the national ANCYL. However, in early October 2011, the Malema-led national leadership of the ANCYL disbanded the league's provincial leadership in KwaZulu-Natal, prematurely ending Dlungwana's term as Provincial Chairperson. The national leadership said that the provincial leadership corps had been disbanded due to ill discipline, but Dlungwana claimed that they were being victimised because they had endorsed Jacob Zuma for re-election as ANC President in 2012, thereby breaking with the national ANCYL's position. Dlungwana subsequently became critical of Malema. When fresh leadership elections were finally run in 2015, he was succeeded as ANCYL Provincial Chairperson by Thami Ngubane.

== Provincial legislature: 2011–2019 ==
On 14 September 2011, a fortnight before he was removed from his ANCYL office, Dlungwana was sworn in to an ANC seat in the KwaZulu-Natal Provincial Legislature, filling a casual vacancy created after the recent local elections when Jeff Vilane resigned from the legislature to become Mayor of Umkhanyakude. In May 2012, Dlungwana was additionally elected to a four-year term on the Provincial Executive Committee of the KwaZulu-Natal branch of the mainstream ANC.

He was re-elected to a full term in his legislative seat in the 2014 general election, ranked 19th on the ANC's provincial party list. The following year, he was elected Regional Chairperson of the ANC's Musa Dladla branch in Umgungundlovu District, succeeding Super Zuma, who had recently been elected ANC Provincial Secretary.

Two years into the legislative term, in May 2016, Willies Mchunu took office as Premier of KwaZulu-Natal, and in June he announced a major cabinet reshuffle in which Dlungwana was appointed to the KwaZulu-Natal Executive Council as MEC for Education. Dlungwana retained that portfolio throughout Mchunu's premiership. Later, in June 2019, he was convicted of contempt of court in relation to his activities as MEC: the Durban Labour Court found that, while he was an MEC, he had failed to comply with a 2015 court order obliging his department to rectify a labour dispute with a public school employee.

In the 2019 general election, Dlungwana was re-elected to the provincial legislature, ranked 22nd on the ANC's party list, but newly elected Premier Sihle Zikalala appointed Kwazi Mshengu to succeed him as MEC for Education. On 15 July 2019, after less than two months as an ordinary Member of the Provincial Legislature, Dlungwana resigned from the provincial legislature; his seat was filled by Themba Mtshali later that month.
