= Mluleki Ndobe =

South African educator and politician (died 2020)

Deputy Speaker of the KwaZulu-Natal Legislature
- In office 22 May 2019 – 6 November 2020
- Preceded by: Meshack Radebe
- Succeeded by: Themba Mthembu

Member of the KwaZulu-Natal Legislature
- In office 22 May 2019 – 6 November 2020

Personal details
- Born: Mluleki Ezekiel Ndobe Umzimkulu, Natal Province, South Africa
- Died: 6 November 2020 Durban, KwaZulu-Natal, South Africa
- Party: African National Congress
- Spouse: Nobuhle (Until 2020; his death)
- Profession: Teacher; Politician

Mluleki Ezekiel Ndobe (died 6 November 2020) was a South African educator and African National Congress politician who served as the deputy speaker of the KwaZulu-Natal Legislature from 2019 until his death in 2020. Before joining the provincial legislature, he was the Executive Mayor of the Harry Gwala District Municipality.

== Early life and education ==
Ndobe was born and raised in Umzimkulu in South Africa's former Natal Province. He matriculated from Ibisi High School. He was an educator by profession. At the time of his death, he was studying for a PhD at the University of KwaZulu-Natal.

== Political career ==
Ndobe was involved in both the Congress of South African Students and the South African Students Congress before he held senior positions in the African National Congress Youth League. He was chairperson of the ANC in the Harry Gwala Region. Ndobe was a member of the ANC's provincial working committee and provincial executive committee. He also served as the party's deputy provincial secretary.

Ndobe served as the Executive Mayor of the Harry Gwala District Municipality for two terms. In his capacity as mayor, he served as the provincial chairperson of the South African Local Government Association.

Ndobe was elected to the KwaZulu-Natal Legislature in the 2019 general election. He was then elected deputy speaker of the provincial legislature, deputising for Ntobeko Boyce. After that, Ndobe was appointed chairperson of the legislature's disciplinary committee.

One of the most controversial story in the life of Ndobe is being allegedly involved in the cowardly assassination of the former ANC Youth League Secretary-General Sindiso Magaqa, who was at the time of his death serving as a councillor in Umzimkhulu Local Municipality.

== Personal life ==
On 17 March 2019, Ndobe was arrested in connection to the murder of senior former ANC Youth League official Sindiso Magaqa and the attempted murders of his two colleagues. The charges were later withdrawn on 25 March.

Ndobe was married to Nobuhle. On 6 November 2020, Ndobe died at his Durban home after he had allegedly committed suicide by shooting himself. He had been undergoing chemotherapy for cancer. His funeral was held on 14 November.
