= Nondumiso Cele =

South African politician

Nondumiso Cele MPL

Member of the KwaZulu-Natal Legislature
- Incumbent
- Assumed office 22 May 2019

Personal details
- Party: ANC

Joice Nondumiso Cele is a South African politician who has been a member of the KwaZulu-Natal Legislature since 2019, representing the African National Congress. She previously served as an eThekwini Metro councillor.

== Political career ==
Cele became a proportional representation (PR) councillor of the eThekwini Metro in 2006. She served as chairperson of the council's Governance & Human Resources Committee and as a member of the metro's Executive Committee (EXCO). In 2012, Cele was fined by the council's ethics committee after it was revealed that she was benefitting financially from Cuphiwe Trading Enterprises that won eThekwini contracts. She received a written warning the following year for the same offence.

== Legislative career ==
Having been ranked 43rd on the ANC's list, Cele was elected to the KwaZulu-Natal Legislature in the 2019 general election as the ANC won 44 seats in the provincial legislature. By November 2021, Cele was a member of the Quality of Life committee, Whips' Forum, Women's Caucus, Health Committee, Arts and Culture Committee, Standing Committee on Oversight, and Sport and Recreation Committee.
