= Mongezi Twala =

South African politician

Mongezi Twala MPL

Member of the KwaZulu-Natal Legislature
- Incumbent
- Assumed office 22 May 2019

Personal details
- Born: Mongezi Wellbeloved Twala
- Party: Economic Freedom Fighters

Mongezi Wellbeloved Twala is a South African politician who has been a Member of the KwaZulu-Natal Legislature since 22 May 2019. He is the provincial Chairperson of the Economic Freedom Fighters. Twala serves on the health, co-operative governance and traditional affairs committees in the legislature.
