= Sipho Hlomuka =

South African politician (born 1980)

Sipho Hlomuka MPL

Member of the KwaZulu-Natal Executive Council for Education
- Incumbent
- Assumed office 18 June 2024
- Premier: Thami Ntuli
- Preceded by: Mbali Frazer

Member of the KwaZulu-Natal Executive Council for Transport, Community Safety and Liaison
- In office 11 August 2022 – 14 June 2024
- Premier: Nomusa Dube-Ncube
- Preceded by: Peggy Nkonyeni
- Succeeded by: Office abolished

KwaZulu-Natal MEC for Co-operative Governance and Traditional Affairs
- In office 27 May 2019 – 11 August 2022
- Premier: Sihle Zikalala
- Preceded by: Nomusa Dube-Ncube
- Succeeded by: Sihle Zikalala

Member of the KwaZulu-Natal Legislature
- Incumbent
- Assumed office 22 May 2019

Personal details
- Born: Siphosihle Emmanuel Hlomuka; 2 July 1980 (age 46) Ladysmith, Natal Province
- Party: African National Congress
- Education: University of KwaZulu-Natal
- Profession: Politician

Siphosihle Emmanuel Hlomuka (born 2 July 1980) is a South African politician who is the Member of the Executive Council (MEC) for Education in KwaZulu-Natal, having been appointed in June 2024. He served as the MEC for Co-operative Governance and Traditional Affairs from May 2019 to August 2022 and then as the MEC for Transport, Community Safety and Liaison from August 2022 until June 2024. Hlomuka was sworn in as a Member of the Provincial Legislature in May 2019. He is the deputy provincial secretary of the African National Congress.

== Early life and education ==
Hlomuka was born in Ladysmith, Natal Province. He studied at the University of KwaZulu-Natal where he obtained a bachelor's degree in public administration and an honours degree in public administration.

== Political career ==
Hlomuka is a member of the African National Congress. He is the party's deputy provincial secretary. He also served in the African National Congress Youth League.

Following the provincial election that was held on 8 May 2019, he was nominated to the KwaZulu-Natal Legislature. He was sworn in as a member on 22 May 2019. On 27 May 2019, premier Sihle Zikalala appointed him to the post of Member of the Executive Council (MEC) for Co-operative Governance and Traditional Affairs, succeeding Nomusa Dube-Ncube. He was sworn in the same day.

On 10 May 2022, Cabinet approved Hlomuka's appointment as the Deputy Director-General of Local Government Support and Interventions Management at the national Cooperative Governance and Traditional Affairs ministry. He will soon vacate his position in the provincial government.

Ahead of the ANC provincial elective conference from 22–24 July 2022, the ANC in eThekwini announced its support for Hlomuka's bid for a second term as deputy provincial secretary. Hlomuka was re-elected at the conference.

On 11 August 2022, Hlomuka was appointed by the newly elected premier Nomusa Dube-Ncube as the MEC for Transport, Community Safety and Liaison.

In June 2024, Hlomuka was appointed by the newly elected premier Thami Ntuli to serve as the MEC for Education in the "Provincial Government of Unity".

== Personal life ==
In November 2019, Hlomuka's brother, Nathi, and his friend were shot dead in a drive-by shooting in Peacetown outside Ladysmith.
