= Mbali Ntuli =

South African politician

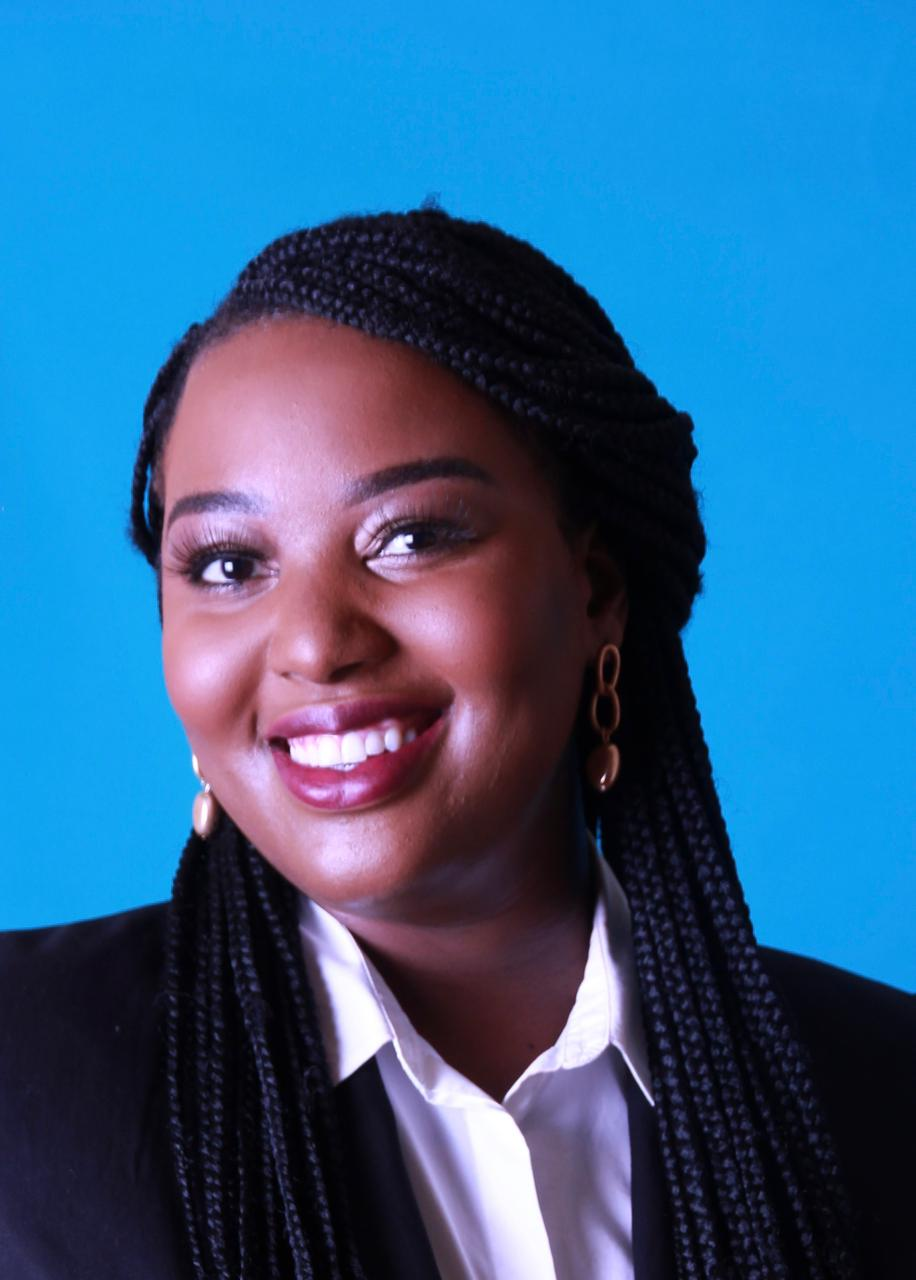

Member of the KwaZulu-Natal Legislature
- In office 22 May 2019 – 17 March 2022
- Succeeded by: Marlaine Nair
- In office 21 May 2014 – January 2018

Personal details
- Born: 28 March 1988 (age 38)
- Party: Democratic Alliance (formerly)
- Education: The Wykeham Collegiate; Rhodes University
- Occupation: Politician

Mbali Ntuli (born c. 28 March 1988) is a South African politician and a former member of the Democratic Alliance (DA). She is the former Provincial Campaigns Director for the party in KwaZulu-Natal (KZN). She resigned as a member of the KwaZulu-Natal Legislature in March 2022, where she served as the DA KZN Spokesperson on Cooperative Governance and Traditional Affairs (CoGTA). She previously served as leader and Chairperson of the Democratic Alliance Youth. She was elected to this position in May 2013.

== Early life and education ==
Ntuli is a native of KwaZulu-Natal (KZN). She grew up in La Lucia. When she was 8 years old, her father, "Big Ben" Ntuli, the founder of the KwaZulu-Natal Taxi Association was murdered. In the wake of his death, her extended family feuded over his business. During that time, both she and her brother survived poisoning by their grandmother, and survived another three assassination attempts. Due to the danger they faced, Ntuli's mother sent her to The Wykeham Collegiate boarding school in Pietermaritzburg. Ntuli holds a Bachelor of Social Science degree from Rhodes University, and runs a taxi business.

== Political career ==
Ntuli is a graduate of the DA Young Leaders programme, and was part of the 2008 class. After graduating, Ntuli returned to KwaZulu-Natal, where she was elected as the party's Provincial Youth Chairperson. In that position, she helped the DA build up their political presence in townships such as KwaMashu and Ntuzuma.

She held the office of Chairperson of the Federal DA Youth from 2010, and was elected on 18 May 2011 as a councillor for the community of Inanda in the eThekwini Municipality, and succeeded Makashule Gana as DA Youth Federal Leader in 2013.

She was elected to the KwaZulu-Natal legislature after the 2014 general election. Following the election, the former leader of the DA in KZN, Sizwe Mchunu, deployed Ntuli to the Mkhanyakude constituency in the north of the province in order to grow support in the area, where the DA had negligible presence. Due to these duties, Ntuli announced in August 2014 that she would stand down as youth leader, to be replaced by Yusuf Cassim.

In 2018, she left the Legislature to take up a staff position for the DA in KZN, as the party's Provincial Campaign Director (PCD). Ntuli's task was to help grow the DA's support in KwaZulu-Natal in the 2019 elections. While the DA in KZN lost their position as the Official Opposition in the province, the party did manage to grow their support from 12.76% to 13.9%, and subsequently, increased the number of seats that they hold in the KZN Legislature, from 10 to 11.

In the 2019 elections, Mbali appeared 2nd on the provincial list for the Democratic Alliance, and took up a seat in the KZN Provincial Legislature as the DA's Spokesperson on Cooperative Governance and Traditional Affairs (CoGTA).

In a letter to DA members and public representatives, Ntuli announced that she would contest the position of the DA Federal Leader at the party's upcoming Federal Congress.

=== Relationship with Helen Zille ===
The relationship between Helen Zille, Federal Leader of the Democratic Alliance from 2007 to 2015, and Mbali Ntuli, was characterised by disagreement and acrimony.

In 2014, Zille called Ntuli a "princess" and a "prima donna", for "repeated instances" of behaviour that Zille regarded as unprofessional. Ntuli had criticised as "strategically unsound" DA plans to march on Luthuli House to complain about an unfulfilled promise of new jobs by the ANC; although Zille encouraged disagreement, she took issue with Ntuli's unwillingness to discuss the topic with her when she tried to reach out to her.

Ntuli faced internal disciplinary charges in 2017, based on allegations that she in December 2016 "liked" a comment on social media, in response to an article about Zille's controversial tweets in 2016, that called Zille "racist"; and that she accused the DA of "inconsistency" in the way it treats contraventions of its social media policy. Acting Western Cape DA leader Bonginkosi Madikizela brought the allegations to the party's attention. Despite advice from the DA legal commission that charges not proceed because they could reflect poorly on the party, federal executive chairman James Selfe maintained that it was the federal executive's duty to investigate the matter in order to be consistent with the way that the party addressed social media faux pas such as Zille's and Dianne Kohler Barnard's.

=== DA Federal Leadership Campaign ===
On the 7th of February 2020, Ntuli launched her campaign to run for the position of DA Federal Leader. She ran against interim leader, John Steenhuisen. During her launch she said, “I think that our current leadership is in a panicked state. I think that what they want to do is stabilise and maintain the status quo. I think that is the wrong approach to where the DA needs to be going because that means we’re going to stagnate and we’re not going to move forward."

A month before the Federal Congress, the DA set rules that prevented candidates from running public campaigns. Ntuli's supporters did not support this rule as she had been running a very public campaign. She challenged Steenhuisen to a live televised debate but that request was denied by both the DA leadership and the Steenhuisen campaign. During her campaign, she criticised the DA leadership for "top-down management". She believed that is why a lot of DA leaders had been "forced to resign." She said this style of leadership was "breaking the DA" and she hoped to change it as Federal leader. She said, " What we have seen is cult-like behaviour associated with big personalities. Past leaders have been known to surround themselves with a small grouping of advisors, some with no on-the-ground community building experience. Some being ideologues, while others being only too happy to leverage their proximity to power to further their own ambitions. When there is a situation like that in a political party, a culture of top-down management becomes dominant, compelling many to either fall in line or risk being either isolated, purged or frustrated into resigning." This critique of the DA leadership led some senior members of the DA to accuse her of not wanting to lead the party but to "leave it in flames." This was fueled by the fact that she ran her campaign at a time after many senior black DA leaders, like former Federal Leader Mmusi Maimane, former Federal chairperson Athol Trollip, former mayor of Johannesburg Herman Mashaba and former Provincial Leader of the DA in Gauteng John Moodey, had recently resigned from the party. In October, she dismissed claims that she would leave the DA should she lose the campaign. As part of her response, she said, “Whether I win or lose, I plan to be here for this entire fight because I really think it’s important.”

Ntuli ran on the idea that she was bringing necessary transformation that would help the DA grow while Steenhuisen was a candidate who was part of the establishment and would maintain the status quo. “Do they vote for John, a candidate that is part of the existing establishment and wishes and seems to really maintain the status quo, or do they vote for a candidate that wishes to reimagine what SA could look like?” Ntuli asked.

The Federal Congress, where the leader would be elected, took place on the 31st of October 2020 to the 1st of November 2020. On the second day of the federal congress, John Steenhuisen was elected as the new leader.

=== Resignation from the DA ===
On 17 March 2022, Ntuli announced in a statement that she had resigned from the DA and therefore the KwaZulu-Natal Legislature. She dismissed speculation that she was going to join Herman Mashaba's ActionSA or any other party.

=== Ground Work Collective ===
In 2022, Ntuli founded the Ground Work Collective, an organisation which aims to increase civic participation, particularly amongst the youth.
