= Mervyn Dirks =

South African politician

Member of the KwaZulu-Natal Provincial Legislature
- Incumbent
- Assumed office 14 June 2024

Member of the KwaZulu-Natal Provincial Legislature
- In office 22 June 2023 – 25 February 2024

Member of the National Assembly of South Africa
- In office 21 May 2014 – 30 January 2023

Personal details
- Born: Mervyn Alexander Dirks
- Party: UMkhonto WeSizwe
- Other political affiliations: African National Congress until Feb 2024
- Profession: Politician

Mervyn Alexander Dirks is a South African politician who served as a Member of the KwaZulu-Natal Provincial Legislature from June 2023 until February 2024. A former member of the African National Congress, he previously served as a member of the National Assembly from May 2014 to January 2023.

During his tenure in parliament, he was the ANC's chief whip in the Standing Committee on Public Accounts until his suspension in January 2022. Dirks was a municipal councillor of the Msunduzi Local Municipality where he served as the deputy mayor.

Dirks joined Jacob Zuma's UMkhonto WeSizwe (MK) party in 2024 and was the MK party's KwaZulu-Natal legislature speaker candidate, however, he was defeated by Ntobeko Boyce of the African National Congress.

== Early life ==
Dirks grew up in the previous Transkei bantustan. He had to use a passport to cross the Umzimkulu River to attend school in the former Natal Province.

== Political career ==
Dirks began his political activism by participating in the Happy Valley rent boycotts. He joined the United Democratic Front in the 1980s and became the organisation's head organiser in the Midlands of KwaZulu-Natal. In 1995, Dirks was elected as a municipal councillor of the Pietermaritzburg municipality. Following the 2006 municipal election, he became a member of the executive committee of the Msunduzi Local Municipality as he was elected deputy mayor. He served in the position until 2010, when the ANC recalled the municipal leadership. Dirks was elected as an MP at the 2014 general election held on 7 May. He was sworn into office on 21 May 2014. The following year, Dirks was elected to the provincial executive committee of the ANC in KwaZulu-Natal. He was re-elected for a second term as an MP in May 2019. In June 2019, he became the chief whip of the ANC in the Standing Committee on Public Accounts.

In January 2022, Dirks wrote a letter to the chairperson of the Standing Committee on Public Accounts (SCOPA), Mkhuleko Hlengwa, in which he requested that the committee to summon ANC president and the current President of South Africa, Cyril Ramaphosa, to appear in front of the committee for his alleged misuse of state funds for party activities. Ramaphosa said in a leaked audio recording that "Investigations will reveal that a lot of public money was used (to fund political campaigns)." On 17 January, ANC chief whip Pemmy Majodina asked Dirks in a letter to withdraw his letter to Hlengwa. Dirks refused and on the same day, he wrote to the ANC's strategy group and demanded that they explain to him as to why he needs to withdraw his letter. On 20 January 2022, the ANC suspended Dirks's membership of the ANC parliamentary group pending disciplinary action against him for his "unbecoming conduct". His membership of the SCOPA was also suspended and he was removed as the whip of the ANC's SCOPA study group. His membership of the ANC's strategy group was also suspended and he was removed from ANC caucus WhatsApp groups. Despite Dirks' suspension, SCOPA chair Hlengwa has said that the investigation will continue.

On 13 December 2022, Dirks was one of five ANC MPs who defied the party whip to vote against the adoption on the Section 89 Panel report on whether sufficient evidence exists to show that President Cyril Ramaphosa committed a serious violation of the Constitution or law or committed a serious misconduct amid the 2020 Phala Phala Robbery.

On 30 January 2023, it was reported that Dirks and fellow ANC MP Tshilidzi Munyai had resigned from the National Assembly amid an impending Cabinet reshuffle by President Cyril Ramaphosa. Dirks said on his resignation that he would remain a party member.

Dirks was sworn in as a member of the KwaZulu-Natal Legislature on 22 June 2023. He filled the casual vacancy arising from Kwazi Mshengu's resignation.

Dirks was expelled from the ANC on 25 February 2024 for aligning himself to former president Jacob Zuma's Umkhonto we Sizwe party which he subsequently joined.

Dirks was appointed MK's Chief Whip in the KwaZulu-Natal legislature in January 2025, and was dismissed in June 2025.

== Incidents ==
In 2017, Dirks attempted to disrupt a parliamentary debate regarding state capture. In August of that same year, he showed middle finger to the opposition MPs. He did it again on 30 November, after he called opposition MP Phumzile van Damme a "straatmeid" (prostitute). On that same day, he also threatened fellow ANC MP Tozama Mantashe, the younger sister of senior party politician Gwede Mantashe. ANC chief whip Jackson Mthembu condemned his actions.

In September 2017, The Witness reported that Dirks had an outstanding municipal debt over R60,000. Later, in 2019, Dirks was referred to the parliamentary Ethics Committee after he called certain MPs "dogs".
