= Ricardo Mthembu =

South African politician (1970–2020)

Member of the KwaZulu-Natal Legislature
- In office 22 May 2019 – 8 July 2020

Mayor of the KwaDukuza Local Municipality
- In office 2011–2019

Personal details
- Born: Njabulo Ricardo Mthembu; 1970 KwaDukuza, Natal Province, South Africa
- Died: 8 July 2020 (aged 50) KwaDukuza, KwaZulu-Natal, South Africa
- Party: African National Congress
- Children: 6
- Profession: Politician

Njabulo Ricardo Mthembu (1970 – 8 July 2020) was a South African politician.

== Career ==
He was a member of the African National Congress and a representative of the party in the KwaZulu-Natal Legislature from 2019 to 2020. Mthembu served on the legislature's Portfolio Committee on Co-operative Governance and Traditional Affairs. Between 2011 and 2019, he served as the Executive Mayor of the KwaDukuza Local Municipality.

He was also the ANC provincial spokesperson and a member of both the party's Provincial Executive Committee and the Provincial Working Committee.

Mthembu died from COVID-19 during the COVID-19 pandemic in South Africa on 8 July 2020. He is survived by his wife, five daughters and a son.
