= Ntobeko Boyce =

South African politician, Speaker of the KwaZulu-Natal Legislature

The Honourable Nontembeko Boyce MPL

Speaker of the KwaZulu-Natal Legislature
- Incumbent
- Assumed office 22 May 2019
- Deputy: Mluleki Ndobe
- Preceded by: Lydia Johnson

Member of the KwaZulu-Natal Legislature
- Incumbent
- Assumed office 21 May 2014

Personal details
- Born: Nontembeko Nothemba Boyce Flagstaff, Cape Province, South Africa
- Party: African National Congress
- Profession: Politician

Nontembeko Nothemba "Ntobeko" Boyce is a South African politician who has been serving as the Speaker of the KwaZulu-Natal Legislature since 22 May 2019. A member of the African National Congress (ANC), she joined the legislature in May 2014. She served as the deputy chief whip before her appointment as chief whip in 2016. She also formerly served as the chairperson of the legislature's Standing Committee on Oversight. Boyce was re-elected as Speaker of the KwaZulu-Natal legislature on 14 June 2024, with support from the Inkatha Freedom Party, Democratic Alliance and National Freedom Party. Boyce received 41 votes and defeated Mervyn Dirks of the UMkhonto WeSizwe party who received 39 votes with the support of the Economic Freedom Fighters.

Political offices
Preceded by Peggy Nkonyeni	Speaker of the KwaZulu-Natal Legislature; 2019–present	Succeeded by Incumbent
