= 2024 KwaZulu-Natal provincial election =

Election in South Africa

← 2019	29 May 2024	2029 →

All 80 seats to the KwaZulu-Natal Legislature 41 seats needed for a majority
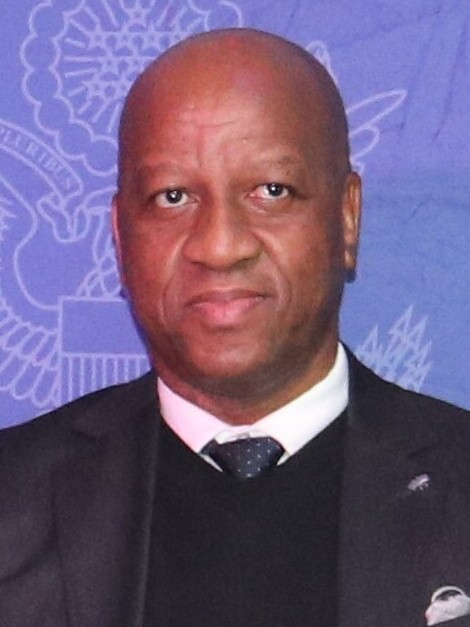

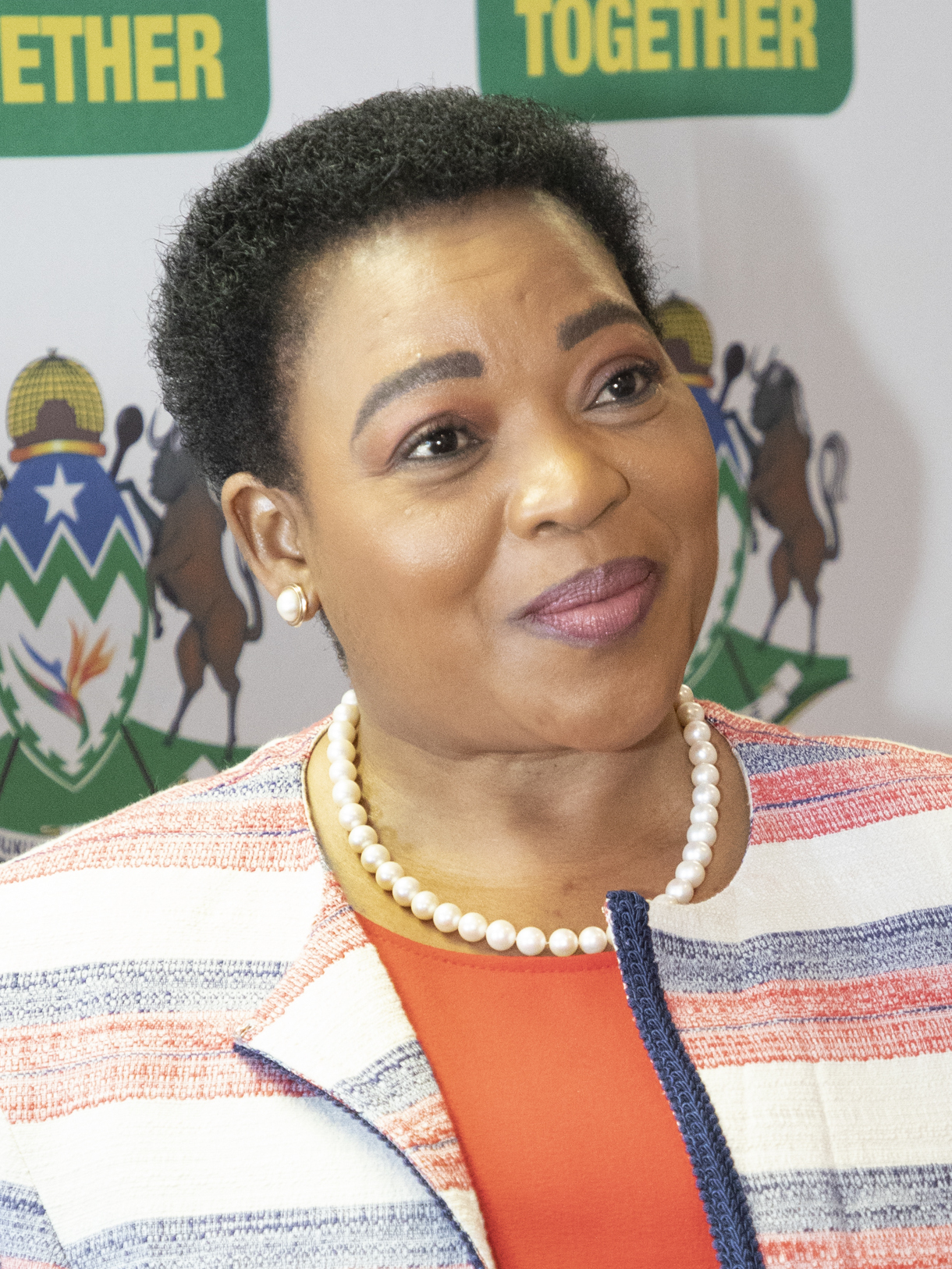

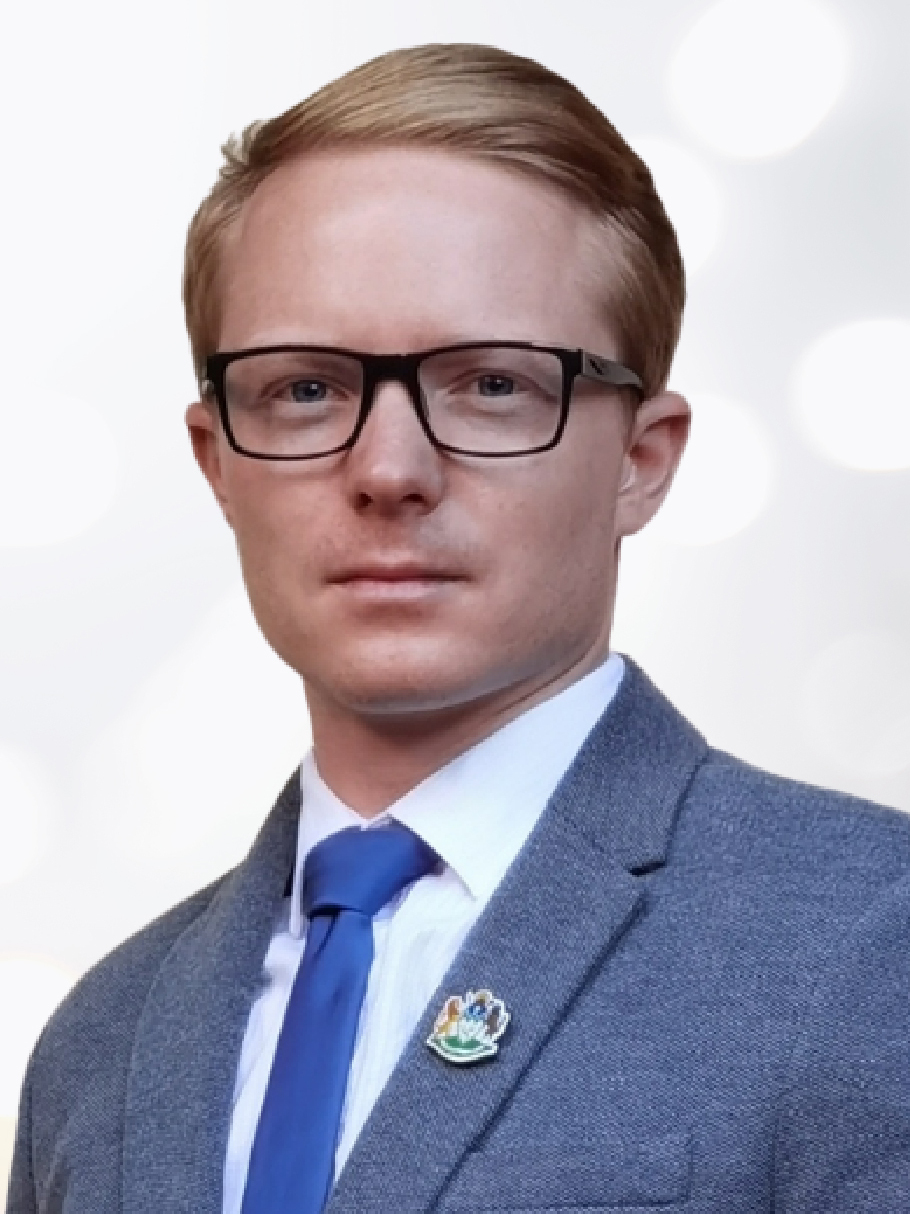
	First party	Second party	Third party
Candidate	Nhlanhla Ngidi	Thami Ntuli	Nomusa Dube-Ncube
Party	MKP	IFP	ANC
Last election	New party	16.34%, 13 seats	54.22%, 44 seats
Seats won	37	15	14
Seat change	New party	▲2	▼30
Popular vote	1,590,813	633,771	595,958
Percentage	45.35%	18.07%	16.99%
Swing	New party	▲1.83%	▼37.23%
	Fourth party	Fifth party	Sixth party
Candidate	Chris Pappas	Mongezi Twala	Cynthia Mbali Shinga
Party	DA	EFF	NFP
Last election	13.90%, 11 seats	9.71%, 8 seats	1.57%, 1 seat
Seats won	11	2	1
Seat change	0	▼5	0
Popular vote	468,515	79,211	19,548
Percentage	13.36%	2.26%	0.56%
Swing	▼0.54%	▼7.45%	▼1.01%
- Results by municipality MKP: 30-40% 40-50% 50-60% 60-70% IFP: 40-50% 50-60% 70-80% ANC 50-60% DA 40-50%
Premier before election
Nomusa Dube-Ncube
ANC
Elected Premier
Thami Ntuli
IFP

The 2024 KwaZulu-Natal provincial election was held on 29 May 2024, concurrently with the 2024 South African general election, to elect the 80 members of the 7th KwaZulu-Natal Legislature. The new uMkhonto weSizwe Party (MKP) won a plurality with 37 of 80 seats, while the African National Congress (ANC) lost its majority for the first time since 2004, finishing third behind the MKP and Inkatha Freedom Party (IFP). IFP candidate Thami Ntuli became premier of KwaZulu-Natal after the election, leading a coalition government supported by the ANC, Democratic Alliance, and National Freedom Party.

== Results ==
Party	Votes	%	+/–	Seats	+/–
uMkhonto we Sizwe	1,590,813	45.35	New	37	New
Inkatha Freedom Party	633,771	18.07	▲2.73	15	▲2
African National Congress	595,958	16.99	▼27.23	14	▼30
Democratic Alliance	468,515	13.36	▼0.54	11	0
Economic Freedom Fighters	79,211	2.26	▼7.65	2	▼6
National Freedom Party	19,548	0.56	▼1.01	1	0
Moodley Thanasagren Rubbanathan	12,323	0.35	New	0	New
African Christian Democratic Party	11,366	0.32	▼0.16	0	▼1
ActionSA	9,569	0.27	New	0	New
Allied Movement for Change	8,007	0.23	New	0	New
Patriotic Alliance	7,843	0.22	New	0	New
African Transformation Movement	6,477	0.18	▼0.31	0	▼1
Democratic Liberal Congress	6,126	0.17	▼0.21	0	0
Al Jama-ah	6,012	0.17	▼0.11	0	0
Freedom Front Plus	5,638	0.16	▼0.15	0	0
Build One South Africa	4,648	0.13	New	0	New
African People's Movement	4,117	0.12	New	0	New
Rise Mzansi	3,898	0.11	New	0	New
Pan Africanist Congress of Azania	3,817	0.11	▲0.04	0	0
Justice and Employment Party	3,626	0.10	▼0.13	0	0
Congress of the People	3,615	0.10	▼0.04	0	0
Abantu Batho Congress	3,214	0.09	New	0	New
People's Freedom Party	3,162	0.09	New	0	New
Sizwe Ummah Nation	2,731	0.08	New	0	New
United Democratic Movement	2,565	0.07	▼0.03	0	0
African Independent Congress	2,527	0.07	▼0.19	0	0
African Movement Congress	2,049	0.06	New	0	New
Good	2,005	0.06	▼0.05	0	0
Arise SA	1,958	0.06	New	0	New
African People First	1,007	0.03	New	0	New
Economic Liberators Forum South Africa	679	0.02	New	0	New
All Citizens Party	631	0.02	New	0	New
Africa Restoration Alliance	629	0.02	New	0	New
Total	3,508,055	100.00	–	80	–
Valid votes	3,508,055	98.88			
Invalid/blank votes	39,761	1.12			
Total votes	3,547,816	100.00			
Registered voters/turnout	5,738,249	61.83			
Source: Electoral Commission of South Africa

== Aftermath ==
Following the election results, no party had an outright majority, leading coalition government to be inevitable. The NFP was regarded as a kingmaker, due to neither the MK-EFF block, or the ANC-DA-IFP block securing an outright majority. A couple of days before the first sitting of provincial legislatures, it was reported that a four way deal between the NFP, DA, IFP, and ANC was to take place while the NFP stated that it was open to coalition talks with any party that approached them in KZN, confirming that they had only held talks with the IFP and ANC. The NFP president later also met with MK party. The EFF publicly said they would back the MK party. The MK party, for its part, approached the IFP for coalition talks, however the IFP claimed the MK party did not show up for negotiations. The NFP later confirmed that they would join a government of provincial unity.

Despite gains in KwaZulu-Natal province during the general election, Jacob Zuma's MK party suffered a major setback in its heartland province on 14 June after the KwaZulu-Natal provincial legislative opted to elect IFP member Thami Ntuli over an MK candidate as Premier of KwaZulu-Natal. Ntuli defeated the MK Party's premier candidate, Zulu Nation's deputy prime minister Phathisizwe Chiliza, with 41 votes to 39. Ntuli is the first IFP member to serve as Premier of KwaZulu-Natal since 2004.
