= Member of the Provincial Legislature =

South African legal title

Member of the Provincial Legislature (MPL) is a title given to the members of eight of the nine provincial legislatures in South Africa. The Western Cape provincial constitution specifies that its provincial legislature be given the title of "Provincial Parliament", while its members hold the title of "Member of Provincial Parliament (MPP)".

According to the national Constitution of South Africa, the minimum size of a provincial legislature is 30 members and the maximum size is 80 members. These members are elected by party-list proportional representation with a closed list, using the largest remainder method with the Droop quota to allocate any surplus. Members are elected to a five-year term with no term-limits. The most recent election occurred in 2024.

== Composition of Provincial Legislatures ==
This list shows nine provincial legislatures and their party composition after the provincial elections of 2024.

Legislature	Seats																			
Legislature	ANC	DA	MK	EFF	IFP	PA	VF+	ActionSA	UDM	ACDP	ATM	ACT	RISE	BOSA	NFP	UAT	NCC	Al Jama-ah	GOOD	Total
Eastern Cape Provincial Legislature	45	11	1	8	0	2	1	0	3	0	1	0	0	0	0	0	0	0	0	72
Free State Legislature	16	7	1	4	0	0	1	0	0	0	0	1	0	0	0	0	0	0	0	30
Gauteng Provincial Legislature	28	22	8	11	1	2	2	3	0	1	0	0	1	1	0	0	0	0	0	80
KwaZulu-Natal Legislature	14	11	37	2	15	0	0	0	0	0	0	0	0	0	1	0	0	0	0	80
Limpopo Legislature	48	4	1	9	0	0	1	0	0	0	0	0	0	0	0	1	0	0	0	64
Mpumalanga Provincial Legislature	27	6	9	7	0	0	1	1	0	0	0	0	0	0	0	1	0	0	0	51
North West Provincial Legislature	23	5	1	7	0	0	1	1	0	0	0	0	0	0	0	1	0	0	0	38
Northern Cape Provincial Legislature	15	7	0	4	0	3	1	0	0	0	0	0	0	0	0	1	0	0	0	30
Western Cape Provincial Parliament	8	24	0	2	0	3	1	0	0	1	0	0	0	0	0	0	1	1	1	42
Totals	224	97	58	54	16	10	9	5	3	2	1	1	1	1	1	1	1	1	1	487

== See also ==
- Member of Parliament (South Africa)
