= KwaZulu-Natal Legislature =

Provincial legislature in South Africa

KwaZulu-Natal Legislature IsiShayamthetho saKwaZulu-Natali (Zulu)
- 7th Legislature

Type
- Type: Unicameral

Leadership
- Speaker: Ntobeko Boyce, African National Congress since 22 May 2019
- Deputy Speaker: Mmabatho Tembe, Democratic Alliance since 14 June 2024
- Premier: Thami Ntuli, Inkatha Freedom Party since 14 June 2024

Structure
- Seats: 80
- Political groups: Government (40): IFP (15); ANC (14); DA (11); Official Opposition (37): MK (37); Other parties (3): EFF (2); NFP (1)

Elections
- Voting system: Party-list proportional representation
- Last election: 29 May 2024

Meeting place
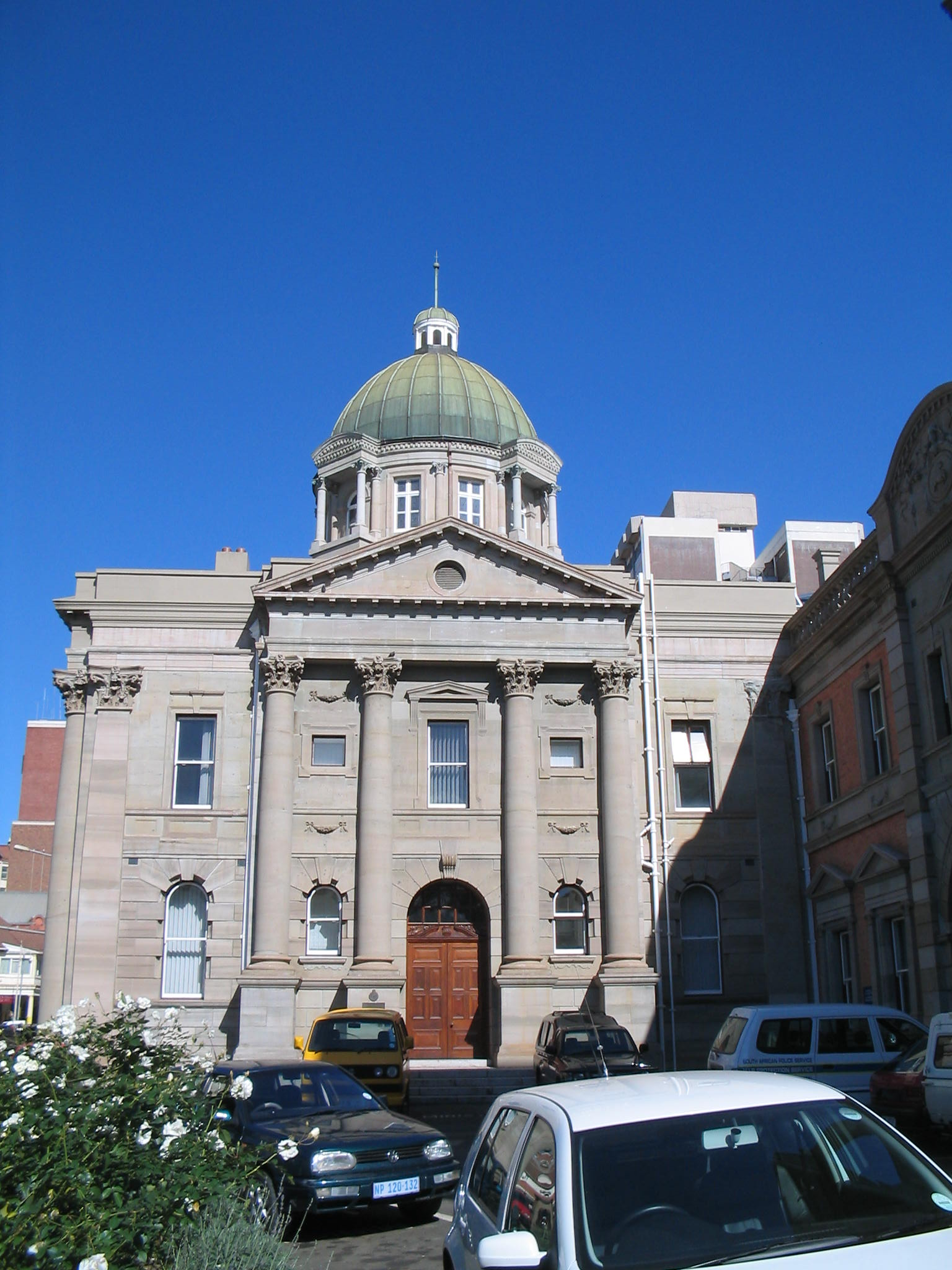
- 239 Langalibalele Street, Pietermaritzburg

Website
- kznlegislature.gov.za

The KwaZulu-Natal Legislature is the primary legislative body of the South African province of KwaZulu-Natal. It is unicameral in its composition and elects the premier and the provincial cabinet from among the leading party or coalition members in the parliament. Thami Ntuli of the Inkatha Freedom Party was elected Premier of KwaZulu-Natal at the first sitting of the provincial legislature on 14 June 2024.

== Powers ==
The KwaZulu-Natal Legislature chooses the Premier of KwaZulu-Natal, the head of the KwaZulu-Natal provincial executive. The legislature can impel the Premier to resign by passing a motion of no confidence. Although the Premier appoints the members of the Executive Council, the legislature may pass a motion of no confidence to force the Premier to reshuffle the Council. The legislature also designates the KwaZulu-Natal's delegates to the National Council of Provinces, allocating delegates to parties in proportion to the number of seats each party holds in the legislature.

The legislature has the power to pass legislation in numerous fields set out in the national constitution; in some fields, the legislative power is shared with the national parliament, while in others it is reserved to the province alone. The fields include matters as health, education (except universities), agriculture, housing, environmental protection, and development planning.

The legislature oversees the administration of the KwaZulu-Natal provincial government, and the Premier of KwaZulu-Natal and the Executive Council members are required to report to the legislature on the performance of their responsibilities. The legislature also manages the financial affairs of the provincial government by way of the appropriation bills which determine the provincial budget.

== Election ==
The provincial legislature consists of 80 members, who are elected through a system of party list proportional representation with closed lists. In other words, each voter casts a vote for one political party, and seats in the legislature are allocated to the parties in proportion to the number of votes received. The seats are then filled by members in accordance with lists submitted by the parties before the election.

The legislature is elected for a term of five years, unless it is dissolved early. This may occur if the legislature votes to dissolve and it is at least three years since the last election, or if the Premiership falls vacant and the legislature fails to elect a new Premier within ninety days. By convention, all nine provincial legislatures and the National Assembly are elected on the same day.

The most recent election was held on 29 May 2024. The following table summarises the results.

Party	Votes	%	+/–	Seats	+/–
uMkhonto we Sizwe	1,590,813	45.35	New	37	New
Inkatha Freedom Party	633,771	18.07	▲2.73	15	▲2
African National Congress	595,958	16.99	▼37.23	14	▼30
Democratic Alliance	468,515	13.36	▼0.54	11	0
Economic Freedom Fighters	79,211	2.26	▼7.65	2	▼6
National Freedom Party	19,548	0.56	▼1.01	1	0
Moodley Thanasagren Rubbanathan	12,323	0.35	New	0	New
African Christian Democratic Party	11,366	0.32	▼0.16	0	▼1
ActionSA	9,569	0.27	New	0	New
Allied Movement for Change	8,007	0.23	New	0	New
Patriotic Alliance	7,843	0.22	New	0	New
African Transformation Movement	6,477	0.18	▼0.31	0	▼1
Democratic Liberal Congress	6,126	0.17	▼0.21	0	0
Al Jama-ah	6,012	0.17	▼0.11	0	0
Freedom Front Plus	5,638	0.16	▼0.15	0	0
Build One South Africa	4,648	0.13	New	0	New
African People's Movement	4,117	0.12	New	0	New
Rise Mzansi	3,898	0.11	New	0	New
Pan Africanist Congress of Azania	3,817	0.11	▲0.04	0	0
Justice and Employment Party	3,626	0.10	▼0.13	0	0
Congress of the People	3,615	0.10	▼0.04	0	0
Abantu Batho Congress	3,214	0.09	New	0	New
People's Freedom Party	3,162	0.09	New	0	New
Sizwe Ummah Nation	2,731	0.08	New	0	New
United Democratic Movement	2,565	0.07	▼0.03	0	0
African Independent Congress	2,527	0.07	▼0.19	0	0
African Movement Congress	2,049	0.06	New	0	New
Good	2,005	0.06	▼0.05	0	0
Arise SA	1,958	0.06	New	0	New
African People First	1,007	0.03	New	0	New
Economic Liberators Forum South Africa	679	0.02	New	0	New
All Citizens Party	631	0.02	New	0	New
Africa Restoration Alliance	629	0.02	New	0	New
Total	3,508,055	100.00	–	80	–
Valid votes	3,508,055	98.88			
Invalid/blank votes	39,761	1.12			
Total votes	3,547,816	100.00			
Registered voters/turnout	5,738,249	61.83			
Source: Electoral Commission of South Africa

The following table shows the composition of the legislature after past elections and floor-crossing periods.

Event	ACDP	ANC	DP/DA	EFF	IFP	MF	MK	NFP	NP/NNP	PAC	UDM	Others
1994 election	1	26	2	—	41	1	—	—	9	1	—	0
1999 election	1	32	7	—	34	2	—	—	3	0	1	0
2003 floor-crossing	1	35	6	—	32	2	—	—	2	0	1	1
2004 election	2	38	7	—	30	2	—	—	0	0	1	0
2005 floor-crossing	1	40	5	—	27	2	—	—	—	0	1	4
2007 floor-crossing	1	41	5	—	27	2	—	—	—	0	1	3
2009 election	1	51	7	—	18	2	—	—	—	0	0	1
2014 election	0	52	10	2	9	1	—	6	—	0	0	0
2019 election	1	44	11	8	13	1	—	1	—	0	0	1
2024 election	0	14	11	2	15	—	37	1	—	0	0	0

== Officers ==
The Speaker of the Legislature is Ntobeko Boyce, while the Deputy Speaker is Mmabatho Tembe. The following people have served as Speaker:

Name	Entered office	Left office	Party
Bonga Mdletshe	1998	2004	IFP
Willies Mchunu	2004	2009	ANC
Peggy Nkonyeni	2009	2013	ANC
Lydia Johnson	2013	2019	ANC
Ntobeko Boyce	2019	Incumbent	ANC
