= List of members of the 3rd KwaZulu-Natal Legislature =

Elected legislature of the KwaZulu-Natal province

3rd KwaZulu-Natal Legislature
←	2nd Legislature	4th Legislature	→
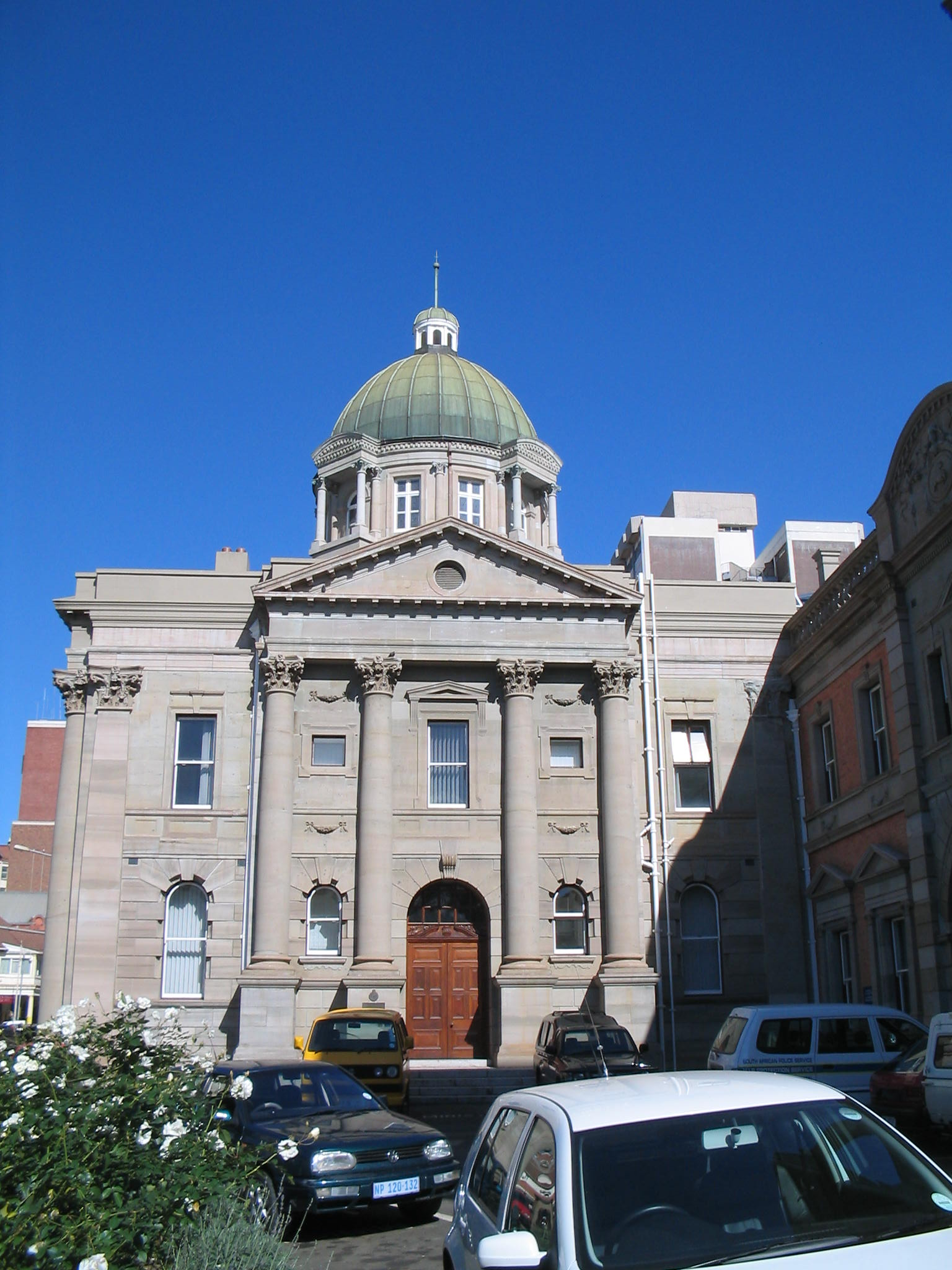
- KwaZulu-Natal Parliament Building

Overview
- Legislative body: KwaZulu-Natal Legislature
- Jurisdiction: KwaZulu-Natal, South Africa
- Term: 23 April 2004 – May 2009
- Election: 14 April 2004
- Members: 80
- Speaker: Willies Mchunu (ANC)
- Deputy Speaker: Mhlabunzima Hlengwa (IFP)
- Premier: S'bu Ndebele (ANC)

This is a list of members of the third KwaZulu-Natal Legislature, as elected in the general election of 14 April 2004. In that election, for the first time since the 1994 general election, the African National Congress (ANC) overtook the Inkatha Freedom Party (IFP) to hold a plurality in the legislature, winning 38 seats against the IFP's 30. The ANC and IFP governed in an ANC-led coalition until November 2006. The Democratic Alliance retained its seven seats, and the other five seats were divided between the African Christian Democratic Party, the Minority Front, and the United Democratic Movement; the New National Party lost its representation in the legislature.

In the aftermath of the election, the ANC named S'bu Ndebele as its candidate for election as Premier of KwaZulu-Natal. During the first sitting of the legislature on 23 April 2004, after members were sworn in to their seats, the outgoing Premier, Lionel Mtshali of the IFP, formally nominated Ndebele as his successor. Ndebele was elected, becoming the province's first Premier from a party other than the IFP. Willies Mchunu was elected as Speaker of the KwaZulu-Natal Legislature and the IFP's Mhlabunzima Hlengwa was elected as Deputy Speaker.

After a period of prevarication, the IFP entered into a coalition agreement with the ANC, in terms of which it was represented in Ndebele's Executive Council. The Minority Front also held one portfolio in the Executive Council. On 1 November 2006, Premier Ndebele sacked the IFP's two Members of the Executive Council, terminating the IFP's participation in the government; he said that the relationship between the parties had been undermined by the IFP's campaign to oust the ANC from control of several KwaZulu-Natal municipalities.

== Composition ==
Party	Seats
African National Congress	38
Inkatha Freedom Party	30
Democratic Alliance	7
African Christian Democratic Party	2
Minority Front	2
United Democratic Movement	1
Total	80

== Members ==
This is a list of members of the second legislature as elected on 14 April 2004. It does not take into account changes in membership after the election.

Name	Party
Jo-Ann Downs	ACDP
Assah Mbatha	ACDP
Bheki Cele	ANC
Ina Cronje	ANC
Sipho Gcabashe	ANC
Thotaram Jeedodh Mata Bhikh Jeebodh	ANC
Lydia Johnson	ANC
Dumisani Nicholas Khuzwayo	ANC
Mbuso Ashman Ishmail Kubheka	ANC
Mike Mabuyakhulu	ANC
Maurice Mansfield Mackenzie	ANC
Dumisane Henry Makhaye	ANC
Senzo Mchunu	ANC
Willies Mchunu	ANC
Priscilla Mary McKay	ANC
Zanele Maria Miya	ANC
Zweli Mkhize	ANC
Zibuse Mlaba	ANC
Samuel Nkosiyezwe Mtetwa	ANC
Mtholephi Mthimkhulu	ANC
Ntombifikile Pretty Molefe	ANC
Yatima Nahara	ANC
Gabriel Ndabandaba	ANC
Sbu Ndebele	ANC
Paulos Nkosenye Ngcobo	ANC
Peggy Ngubane	ANC
Marlene Virginia Noel	ANC
Meshack Radebe	ANC
Belinda Scott	ANC
Lizzie Shabalala	ANC
George Mzwakhefana Sithole	ANC
Omie Singh	ANC
Jan Slabbert	ANC
Nonzwakazi Swartbooi	ANC
Vuyelwa Vivian Tambo	ANC
Mike Tarr	ANC
Weziwe Thusi	ANC
Sihlangu Joffrey Vilane	ANC
Cyril Xaba	ANC
Roger Burrows	DA
Radley Keys	DA
Johann Krog	DA
Ramarak Maharaj	DA
Ganesan Mari	DA
Margaret Hewlett Moore	DA
Wilson Ngcobo	DA
John Fredric Aulsebrook	IFP
Geoffrey Bhengu	IFP
Bonginkosi Thomas Buthelezi	IFP
Henry Jean Combrinck	IFP
Faith Gasa	IFP
Poobalan Govender	IFP
Simon Gumede	IFP
Blessed Gwala	IFP
Alexander James Hamilton	IFP
Mhlabunzima Hlengwa	IFP
Moses Khubisa	IFP
Mandla Saul Malakoana	IFP
Jabulani Simon Maphalala	IFP
Ephraim Sipho Mbatha	IFP
Lindiwe Mbuyazi	IFP
Bonga Mdletshe	IFP
Busi Sybil Mohlaka	IFP
Christian Msimang	IFP
Celani Jeffrey Mtetwa	IFP
Mpikayipheli Joel Mthethwa	IFP
Lionel Mtshali	IFP
Mziwamandla Mzobe	IFP
Soobramoney Naicker	IFP
Lauretta Gladys Ngcobo	IFP
Sibusiso Benedict Ngidi	IFP
Nyanga Ngubane	IFP
Thandabantu David Ntombela	IFP
Kamal Panday	IFP
Narend Singh	IFP
Gideon Zulu	IFP
Amichand Rajbansi	MF
Shameen Thakur-Rajbansi	MF
Bongani Johnson Msomi	UDM
