= List of members of the 2nd KwaZulu-Natal Legislature =

Elected legislature of the KwaZulu-Natal province

2nd KwaZulu-Natal Legislature
←	1st Legislature	3rd Legislature	→
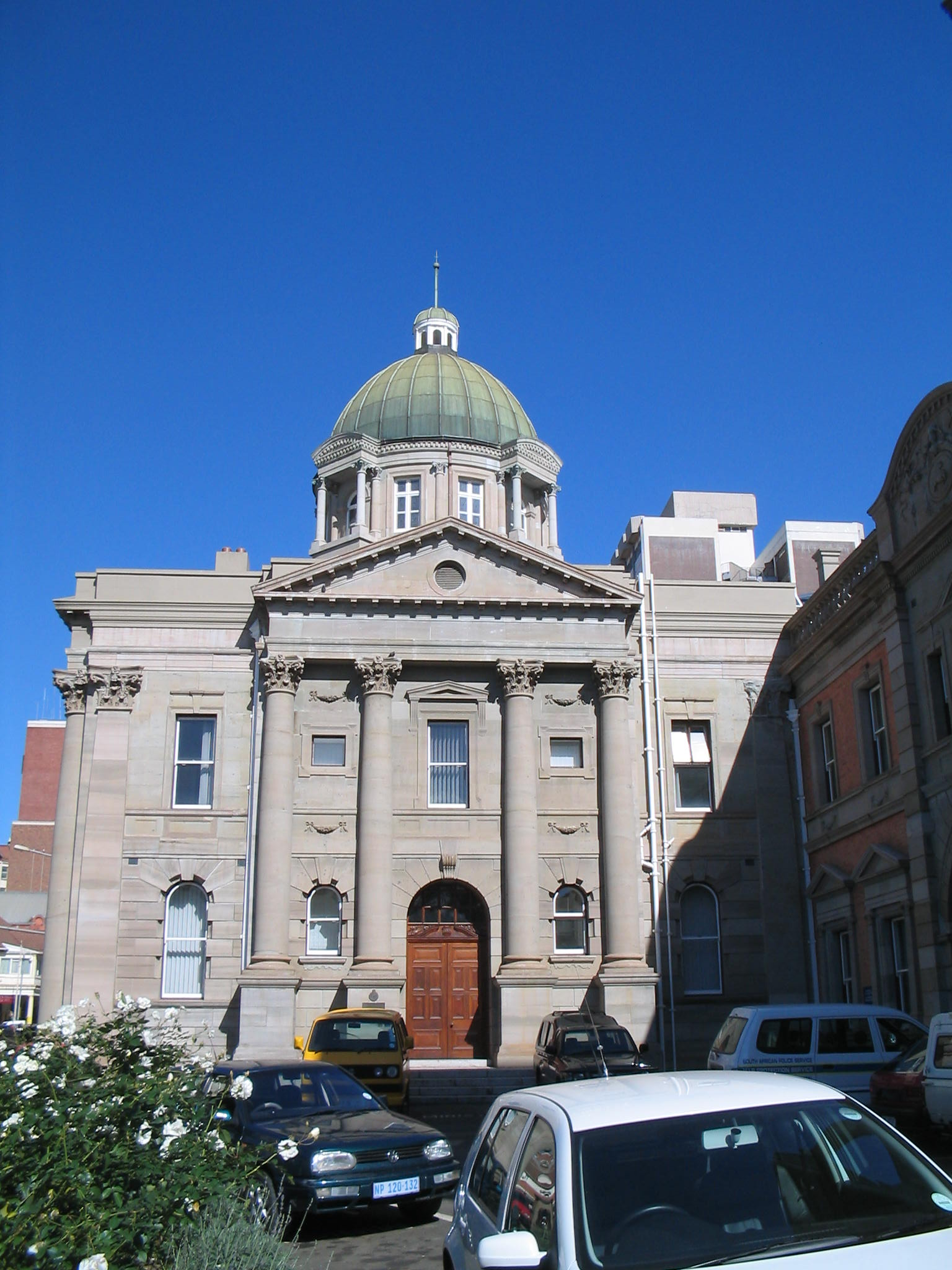
- KwaZulu-Natal Parliament Building

Overview
- Legislative body: KwaZulu-Natal Legislature
- Jurisdiction: KwaZulu-Natal, South Africa
- Term: 18 June 1999 – April 2004
- Election: 2 June 1999
- Members: 80
- Speaker: Bonga Mdletshe (IFP)
- Deputy Speaker: Willies Mchunu (ANC)
- Premier: Lionel Mtshali (IFP)

This is a list of members of the second KwaZulu-Natal Legislature, as elected in the election of 2 June 1999. The Inkatha Freedom Party (IFP) lost its majority in the legislature but retained a plurality, holding 34 seats in the 80-seat legislature. It formed a coalition government with the second-largest party, the African National Congress (ANC), which won 32 seats. Also represented were the Democratic Party, with seven seats; the New National Party, with three seats; the Minority Front, with two seats; and the United Democratic Movement and African Christian Democratic Party, with one seat apiece. The United Democratic Movement was a new entrant to the legislature, while the Pan Africanist Congress lost its representation.

After the election, the first sitting of the legislature was postponed to allow the parties to enter into negotiations over the formation of a government. At the first sitting, held on 18 June 1999, members were sworn in to their seats and re-elected Lionel Mtshali as Premier of KwaZulu-Natal. He defeated the opposition candidate, the Democratic Party's Roger Burrows, with 67 votes to Burrows's eight; the ANC had withdrawn the nomination of its own candidate, Sbu Ndebele, in favour of joining a coalition with the IFP. The ANC was therefore represented in Mtshali's Executive Council. The IFP's Bonga Mdletshe was re-elected as Speaker of the KwaZulu-Natal Legislature, and the ANC's Willies Mchunu was re-elected as his deputy.

== Composition ==
Party	Seats
Inkatha Freedom Party	34
African National Congress	32
Democratic Party	7
New National Party	3
Minority Front	2
African Christian Democratic Party	1
United Democratic Movement	1
Total	80

== Members ==
This is a list of members of the second legislature as elected on 2 June 1999. It does not take into account changes in membership after the election.

Name	Party
Jo-Ann Downs	ACDP
Yusuf Bhamjee	ANC
Happy Blose	ANC
Bheki Cele	ANC
Ina Cronje	ANC
Felix Dlamini	ANC
Walter Felgate	ANC
Lungi Gcabashe	ANC
Lydia Johnson	ANC
Mbuso Ashman Ishmail Kubheka	ANC
Zanele Ludidi	ANC
Michael Mabuyakhulu	ANC
Dumisane Henry Makhaye	ANC
Senzo Mchunu	ANC
Willies Mchunu	ANC
Ismail Chota Meer	ANC
Zweli Mkhize	ANC
Zibuse Mlaba	ANC
Sam Mtetwa	ANC
Mtholephi Mthimkhulu	ANC
Thamsanqa Samuel Mohlomi	ANC
Ntombifikile Pretty Molefe	ANC
Yatima Nahara	ANC
Sbu Ndebele	ANC
Paulos Ngcobo	ANC
Nhlanhla Victor Ngidi	ANC
Peggy Nkonyeni	ANC
Meshack Radebe	ANC
Lizzie Shabalala	ANC
Nonzwakazi Swartbooi	ANC
Vuyelwa Vivian Tambo	ANC
Sihlangu Joffrey Vilane	ANC
Cyril Xaba	ANC
Belinda Barrett	DP
Roger Burrows	DP
Radley Keys	DP
Mark Lowe	DP
Margaret Hewlett Moore	DP
Wessel Uys Nel	DP
Ndawayoakhe Ngcobo	DP
John Fredric Aulsebrook	IFP
Henry Jean Combrinck	IFP
Faith Gasa	IFP
Simon Gumede	IFP
Blessed Gwala	IFP
Alexander James Hamilton	IFP
Moses Khubisa	IFP
Arthur Koningkramer	IFP
Maurice Mansfield Mackenzie	IFP
Mandla Saul Malakoana	IFP
Ephraim Sipho Mbatha	IFP
Bonga Mdletshe	IFP
Peter Maxwell Miller	IFP
Teressa Millin	IFP
Sybil Mohlaka	IFP
Celani Jeffrey Mtetwa	IFP
Lionel Mtshali	IFP
Mziwamandla Mzobe	IFP
Johan Ngcobo	IFP
Lauretta Gladys Ngcobo	IFP
Vincent Ngema	IFP
Sibusiso Ngidi	IFP
Nyanga Ngubane	IFP
Eileen Nkosi	IFP
David Thandabantu Ntombela	IFP
Kamal Panday	IFP
Phillip Powell	IFP
Usha Roopnarain	IFP
Thomas Mandla Shabalala	IFP
Narend Singh	IFP
Mike Tarr	IFP
Ellis Vezi	IFP
Maria Xulu	IFP
Gideon Zulu	IFP
Amichand Rajbansi	MF
Shameen Thakur-Rajbansi	MF
Siphos Mkhize	NNP
Soobramoney Naicker	NNP
Valentin Volker	NNP
Samuel Nxumalo	UDM
