= Gabriel Ndabandaba =

South African politician and academic (born 1935)

Member of the National Assembly
- In office 6 May 2009 – 6 May 2014
- Constituency: KwaZulu-Natal
- In office June 1999 – 27 June 2001
- Constituency: KwaZulu-Natal

KwaZulu-Natal Legislature
- In office July 2001 – May 2009

Member of the KwaZulu-Natal Executive Council for Agriculture and Environmental Affairs
- In office April 2004 – 1 November 2006
- Premier: S'bu Ndebele
- Succeeded by: Mtholephi Mthimkhulu

Member of the KwaZulu-Natal Executive Council for Education
- In office 6 July 2001 – 24 March 2003
- Premier: Lionel Mtshali
- Preceded by: Faith Gasa

Personal details
- Born: 14 April 1935 (age 91)
- Citizenship: South Africa
- Party: African National Congress (since March 2003)
- Other political affiliations: Inkatha Freedom Party (until March 2003)
- Children: 8, including Gabriel Siyabonga Ndabandaba (d. 2005)

Lindumusa Bekizitha Gabriel Ndabandaba (born 14 April 1935) is a retired South African politician and academic who served in the National Assembly and KwaZulu-Natal Provincial Legislature from 1999 to 2014. He represented the Inkatha Freedom Party (IFP) until 2003, when he crossed the floor to the African National Congress (ANC).

Formerly a criminology professor in KwaZulu-Natal, Ndabandaba joined the National Assembly in 1999 as a member of the IFP. He left the national Parliament in June 2001 to join the KwaZulu-Natal Executive Council, where he served under Premier Lionel Mtshali as KwaZulu-Natal's Member of the Executive Council (MEC) for Education from 2001 to 2003. Citing his frustration with Mtshali, Ndabandaba crossed the floor to the ANC in March 2003.

As a representative of the ANC, Ndabandaba served under Premier S'bu Ndebele as MEC for Agriculture and Environmental Affairs from 2004 to 2006 and as Deputy Speaker of the KwaZulu-Natal Legislature from 2006 to 2009. In 2009, he concluded his eight-year service in the provincial legislature and returned to the National Assembly, where he served a single term for the ANC. He failed to gain re-election in the 2014 general election.

== Early life and academic career ==
Ndabandaba was born on 14 April 1935. A former high school teacher, he was a lecturer in criminology at the University of Zululand before becoming vice-principal of student affairs at Mangosuthu Technikon.

== Legislative career ==
=== National Assembly: 1999–2001 ===
In the 1999 general election, Ndabandaba was elected to represent the IFP in the National Assembly, the lower house of the South African Parliament; he served the KwaZulu-Natal constituency. However, just over two years into the legislative term, media reported that Ndabandaba was expected to leave Parliament for the KwaZulu-Natal Provincial Legislature: KwaZulu-Natal Premier Lionel Mtshali was reportedly considering him as a candidate to replace Faith Gasa as Education MEC. Ndabandaba resigned from his parliamentary seat on 27 June 2001.

=== KwaZulu-Natal Legislature: 2001–2009 ===
==== Education MEC: 2001–2003 ====
On 6 July 2001, Ndabandaba was sworn in as KwaZulu-Natal's MEC for Education. He said that his priorities in the portfolio would be improving matriculation results, raising teachers' morale, and "restoring dignity to the department" after the controversies presided over by his predecessors.

During the floor-crossing window of March 2003, Ndabandaba announced his defection from the IFP to the ANC, which at the time was in opposition in KwaZulu-Natal. Ndabandaba said that his departure was motivated in large part by the conduct of Premier Mtshali, who he said had "humiliated me every step of the way", preventing him from making decisions about the education portfolio and even from hiring staff at his office. In a statement, he said:

It is with great relief that I announce that my body has joined my soul. I have decided to follow my conscience. I have joined the ranks of those who, when we were naked among the wolves, decided to stand up against the apartheid colonial tyranny... My humiliation, harassment and the stifling of all my creativity and initiatives by Mtshali were the final straw that broke the camel's back. I have taken such a decision not only because of my personal humiliation by Mtshali who has caused many people to lose political direction in the party – the IFP as a whole has lost political direction.

Later the same day, 24 March, Mtshali said that he had fired Ndabandaba as Education MEC, although he would continue to hold his seat in the legislature under the ANC banner. The ANC said that Mtshali's decision to fire him was "irresponsible" and demonstrated that "the IFP is handling education in a reckless manner in this province".

At the end of the floor-crossing window, the ANC, newly wielding a plurality in the provincial legislature, said that it would table a motion of no-confidence in Mtshali if he did not reinstate Ndabandaba as Education MEC, as well as reinstate two other ANC ministers – Dumisani Makhaye and Mike Mabuyakhulu – who had been fired from the Executive Council in late 2003. Mtshali agreed to reappoint two ANC members to his Executive Council but said that he would not accept Ndabandaba back, given that Ndabandaba had crossed the floor "on account of his incapability or unwillingness to work with me".

==== Agriculture MEC: 2004–2006 ====
A year later, in the 2004 general election, the ANC won control of the KwaZulu-Natal Legislature and Ndabandaba was re-elected to his seat. The ANC's S'bu Ndebele, who succeeded Mtshali as Premier, appointed Ndabandaba to his Executive Council as MEC for Agriculture and Environmental Affairs. He served in the portfolio for just over two years before Ndebele sacked him in a cabinet reshuffle announced on 1 November 2006. He was replaced as MEC by Mtholephi Mthimkhulu and served the rest of the term as Deputy Speaker of the KwaZulu-Natal Legislature, deputising Willies Mchunu.

=== Return to Parliament: 2009–2014 ===
In the 2009 general election, Ndabandaba returned to the National Assembly, again serving the KwaZulu-Natal constituency but now under the banner of the ANC. Mtholephi Mthimkhulu succeeded him as provincial deputy speaker. He stood for re-election to Parliament in the next general election in 2014, but he was ranked 197th on the ANC's national party list and did not secure a seat.

== Personal life ==
Ndabandaba is married and had eight children. One of his sons, Gabriel Siyabonga Ndabandaba, was South Africa's first black aerobatics pilot, a former lieutenant in the South African Air Force, and a commercial pilot for South African Airways. He died in September 2005 while performing a stunt at an airshow in Vereeniging, in an accident that received wide media coverage.

In 2009, the KwaZulu-Natal government sued Ndabandaba and two officials who worked under him at the agriculture department; the government claimed that the department had contravened the Public Finance Management Act by spending R126,500 in public funds on Ndabandaba's son's funeral at the Durban International Convention Centre in 2005. Ndabandaba said that the officials had offered him help securing a venue for the funeral but that he had not instructed the department to pay for the event.
