= Nhlanhla Zulu =

South African politician and Zulu prince (d. 2007)

Member of the National Assembly
- In office 1995 – 15 June 2007
- Constituency: KwaZulu-Natal

Personal details
- Born: 20 January 1940
- Died: 15 June 2007 (aged 67)
- Citizenship: South Africa
- Party: Inkatha Freedom Party

Prince Nhlanhla Elijah Zulu (20 January 1940 – 15 June 2007) was a South African politician and prince of the Zulu royal family. He represented the Inkatha Freedom Party (IFP) in the National Assembly from 1995 until his death in 2007. A founding member of the IFP in 1975, he also served on the party's National Council until his death.

== Early life and career ==
Zulu was born on 20 January 1940 and was the son of Prince Nojombo and grandson of Zulu King Dinuzulu. He was educated as a laboratory technician and from 1967 worked at Sappi.

According to Zulu's cousin, Prince Mangosuthu Buthelezi, Zulu was a founding member of Buthelezi's Inkatha movement (later renamed the IFP) in 1975. He became the chairperson of Inkatha's branch in Mandini, KwaZulu-Natal, and was a member of the party's Central Committee (later its National Council) until his death.

== Legislative career: 1995–2007 ==
In 1995, Zulu was sworn into an IFP seat in the National Assembly, filling a casual vacancy. He served in the seat until his death in 2007, gaining re-election in 1999 and 2004, and he represented the KwaZulu-Natal constituency.

== Personal life and death ==
Zulu was polygamous, in line with Zulu tradition, and had children. At the time of his death, all four of his sons were deceased. He told the Los Angeles Times that two of his sons had been murdered – one shot and the other stabbed – for political reasons, "simply because they were my children", in the aftermath of the 1994 general election.

He died on 15 June 2007 after spending several weeks in hospital. His seat in the National Assembly was filled by Narend Singh.
