= 35th Inkatha Freedom Party National General Conference =

South African political party leadership election

- August 23–25, 2019
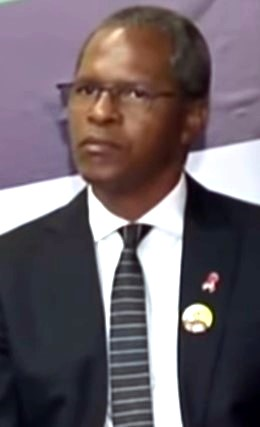
Candidate	Velenkosini Hlabisa
Popular vote	Unopposed
President before election
Mangosuthu Buthelezi
Elected President
Velenkosini Hlabisa

The 35th Inkatha Freedom Party National General Conference was held from 23 to 25 August 2019 to elect the new leadership of the Inkatha Freedom Party (IFP). The previous elective conference was held in 2012. Party president Mangosuthu Buthelezi had announced his intention to retire after serving in the position for more than forty-four years. He was the party's inaugural president. It was understood that the party's IFP Extended National Council favoured the Leader of the Opposition in the KwaZulu-Natal Legislature, Velenkosini Hlabisa, to succeed him as party president. Hlabisa was elected unopposed.

== Events leading up to the conference ==
Mangosuthu Buthelezi established the party in March 1975 and had led it since its inception.

In October 2017, the IFP Extended National Council started the process of selecting a new leader to succeed Buthelezi in the 2019 general elective conference. The council nominated Velenkosini Hlabisa as its preferred leadership candidate. It was initially speculated that the party would nominate deputy party president, Inkosi Buthelezi, but Mangosuthu Buthelezi said that the council preferred to retain him in his post.

Mangosuthu Buthelezi officially confirmed on 20 January 2019 that he would not seek re-election to another term as party president of the IFP.

Following the May 2019 South African general election, the IFP increased its seat total in the National Assembly to 14 seats, a gain of four seats. The party managed to regain the title of the official opposition in the KwaZulu-Natal Legislature after it lost it to the Democratic Alliance in 2014. The IFP confirmed that Buthelezi would remain parliamentary leader of the party in the National Assembly and that the elective conferences would proceed. Hlabisa was designated as Leader of the Opposition in the KwaZulu-Natal Legislature, as he was the party's premier candidate for the 2019 elections.

On 10 June 2019, the IFP officially set the dates for the party's elective conferences preceding the general elective conference in August 2019. The first of the conferences to be held were the provincial conferences. The party's KwaZulu-Natal branch elected Nkandla mayor Thamsanqa Ntuli as its new provincial chair. The election of Ntuli was seen as an apparent revolt to Buthelezi's succession plan. The IFP Youth Brigade held its elective conference from 13 to 14 July 2019, while the Women's Brigade held its conference from 27 to 28 July 2019.

== New leadership elected ==
The IFP elective conference began on 23 August 2019. Buthelezi delivered his final speech as party president on 24 August 2019. The new leadership were announced on 25 August 2019 and is as follows:

- President – Velenkosini Hlabisa
- Deputy President – Inkosi Buthelezi
- Secretary-General – Siphosethu Ngcobo
- Deputy Secretary-General – Albert Mncwango
- National Chairperson – MB Gwala
- Deputy National Chairperson – Thembinkosi Kamadlopha-Mthethwa
- Treasurer-General – Narend Singh
