= Hlengwa =

Hlengwa is a surname. Notable people with the surname include:

- Magdalena Hlengwa (born 1951), South African politician
- Mkhuleko Hlengwa (born 1987), South African politician
- Mhlabunzima Hlengwa (1945–2005), South African politician and Zulu leader
