= Eileen Nkosi-Shandu =

South African politician (1944–2021)

Member of the KwaZulu-Natal Legislature
- In office February 1999 – April 2004

Member of the KwaZulu-Natal Executive Council for Education
- In office February 1999 – August 2000
- Premier: Lionel Mtshali
- Preceded by: Vincent Zulu
- Succeeded by: Faith Gasa

Deputy Minister of Public Works
- In office March 1996 – February 1999
- Minister: Jeff Radebe

Member of the National Assembly
- In office May 1994 – February 1999

Personal details
- Born: Eileen Eidana Nkosi; 12 January 1944 Ngotshe, Natal; Union of South Africa
- Died: May 2021 (aged 77)
- Citizenship: South Africa
- Party: Inkatha Freedom Party
- Education: Inanda Seminary School
- Alma mater: University of Botswana and Swaziland

Eileen Eidana Nkosi-Shandu (née Nkosi; 12 January 1944 – May 2021) was a South African politician who served as Deputy Minister of Public Works in the South African Government of National Unity from 1996 to 1999. From 1999 to 2000, she was KwaZulu-Natal's Member of the Executive Council (MEC) for Education, until she was sacked in a nepotism scandal.

Nkosi-Shandu joined her political party, the Inkatha Freedom Party (IFP), in 1979, while working as a teacher and school principal in KwaZulu-Natal. She represented the IFP in the National Assembly from 1994 to 1999 and in the KwaZulu-Natal Legislature from 1999 to 2004.

== Early life and career ==
Nkosi-Shandu was born on 12 January 1944 to Christian parents at Draai-om, a farm outside Ngotshe in the former Natal province. She attended rural schools for most of her childhood and matriculated from Inanda Seminary. After completing her teaching diploma, she began work in 1968, teaching biology and English at secondary schools in Eshowe and neighbouring Swaziland. In 1977, she graduated with a BA from the University of Botswana and Swaziland, and she continued her education at the Canadian Coady International Institute, where she completed a diploma in community development in 1979.

While teaching and studying, she was active in community programmes and cooperatives, and she joined Inkatha in 1979, becoming particularly prominent in the Inkatha Women's Brigade. She worked as a community development officer for Inkatha from 1980 to 1983 before returning to education, and thereafter was principal of Ekudubekeni High School in rural Mahlabatini from 1983 to 1994.

== Legislative career: 1994–2004 ==
=== National Assembly: 1994–1999 ===
In South Africa's first post-apartheid elections in 1994, Nkosi-Shandu was elected to represent Inkatha (by then restyled as the IFP) in the National Assembly. She was a member of the Portfolio Committee on Public Works. Later in the legislative term, from 1 March 1996, she was Deputy Minister of Public Works in President Nelson Mandela's Government of National Unity, deputising Minister Jeff Radebe.

=== KwaZulu-Legislature: 1999–2004 ===
On 31 January 1999, IFP leader Mangosuthu Buthelezi announced that Nkosi-Shandu would leave the national cabinet and National Assembly to move to the province of KwaZulu-Natal, which at the time was governed by the IFP. She was to be sworn in to the KwaZulu-Natal Legislature in order to take up office as MEC for Education after the incumbent, Vincent Zulu, was sacked for the province's poor matric results in 1998; also sacked for the same reason was KwaZulu-Natal Premier Ben Ngubane, who was replaced by Lionel Mtshali. Nkosi-Shandu remained in the KwaZulu-Natal Legislature in the next legislative term, gaining election to a full term in her seat in the 1999 general election.

Weeks after taking office as Education MEC, Nkosi-Shandu attracted national attention by announcing her support for the use of corporal punishment in schools, which she said was the surest way of maintaining "an orderly and safe environment". She said that her view was shared by parents and that she had herself made an "internal arrangement" with her son's school, encouraging them to "klap him" (Afrikaans for "slap") if he misbehaved, in contravention of the South African Schools Act.

On 22 August 2000, Nkosi-Shandu was sacked from the provincial cabinet in a nepotism scandal: it had emerged that her brother, Isaac Nkosi, had been appointed as deputy director-general in her department, despite performing poorly in the recruitment process. The provincial legislature found Nkosi-Shandu guilty of misconduct and Premier Mtshali, announcing her dismissal, said that Nkosi's appointment "was the last straw that cut short the Minister's brilliant career... It is regrettable that the minister did not heed wise counsel to reconsider her decision and re-advertise the post."

She was succeeded as MEC by Faith Gasa, whose husband created a stir in October 2000 by telling the press that the department's staff remained loyal to Nkosi-Shandu and that Gasa was "being bewitched by Shandu". Nkosi-Shandu said that she had "no problem with [Gasa]" and that she was "so confused" by the allegation that she did not know how to respond. She continued as an ordinary Member of the Provincial Legislature until 2004, announcing in February 2004 that she would not return to the legislature after that year's general election. Press speculated that she was retiring pre-emptively because she was ranked poorly on the IFP's party list.

== Death ==
She died in May 2021.
