= Mandeni Local Municipality =

Coordinates: 29°09′06″S 31°24′29″E

Mandeni
- Local municipality
- Seal

- Location in KwaZulu-Natal
- Country: South Africa
- Province: KwaZulu-Natal
- District: iLembe
- Seat: Mandeni
- Wards: 18

Government
  - Type: Municipal council

Area
  - Total: 545 km^{2} (210 sq mi)

Population (2011)
  - Total: 138,078
  - Density: 253/km^{2} (656/sq mi)

Racial makeup (2011)
  - Black African: 96.7%
  - Coloured: 0.5%
  - Indian/Asian: 1.7%
  - White: 1.0%

First languages (2011)
  - Zulu: 89.9%
  - English: 4.6%
  - Southern Ndebele: 1.2%
  - Other: 4.3%
- Time zone: UTC+2 (SAST)
- Municipal code: KZN291

Map showing Mandeni Municipality

Mandeni Local Municipality (formerly eNdondakusuka Local Municipality) is an administrative area in the iLembe District of KwaZulu-Natal in South Africa.

Manufacturing, elementary work and plant and machine work are the highest non-farming categories of labour. Mandeni includes substantial areas of commercial agriculture, with the bulk of these areas under sugar-cane. Agriculture is the main employment sector in the area.

== Main places ==
The 2001 census divided the municipality into the following main places:

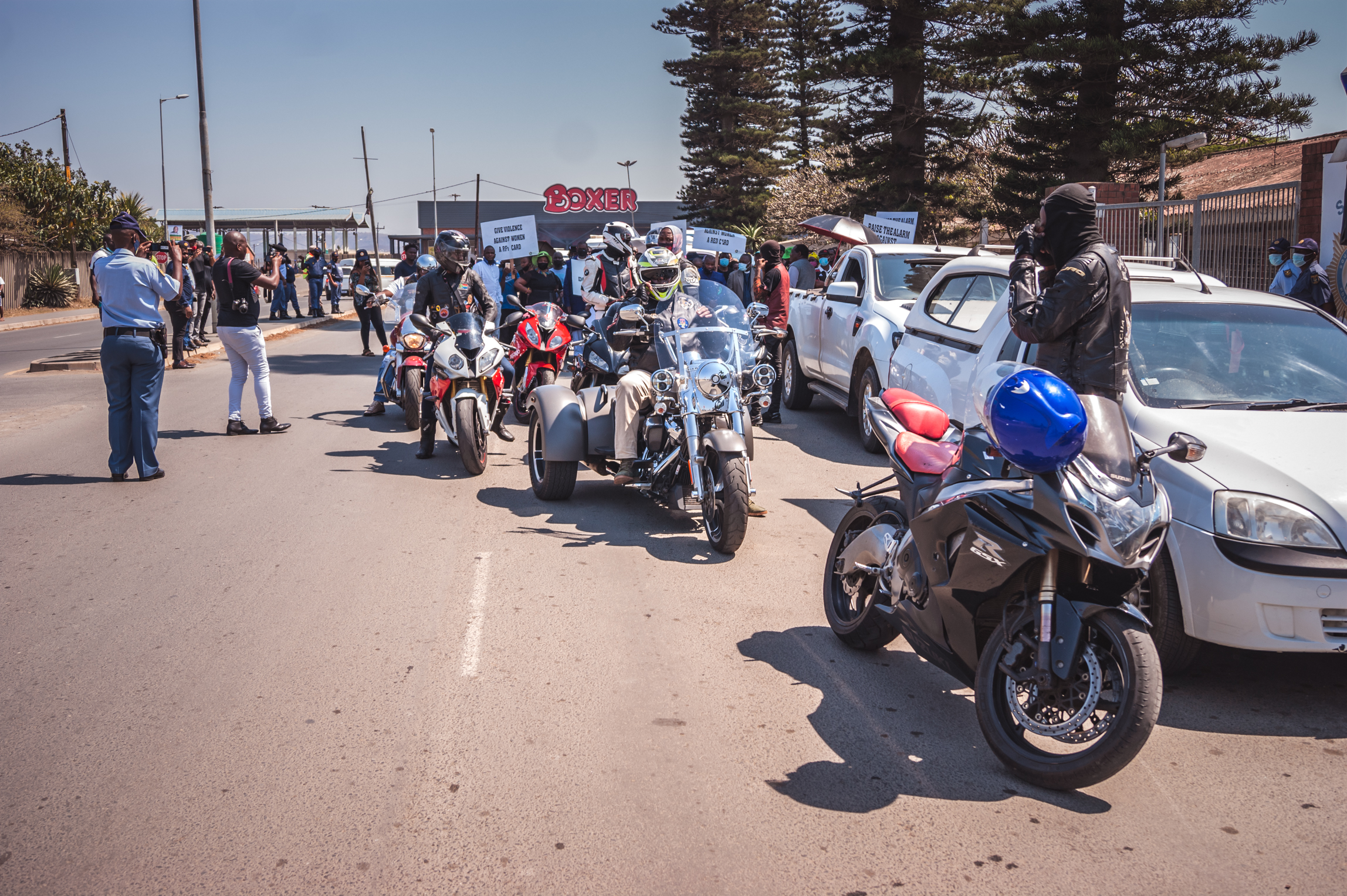
Bikers at a GBV event eMandeni

Place	Code	Area (km^{2})	Population
eNdondakusuka	54301	160.30	6,126
Hlomendini	54302	24.74	1,339
Macambini	54303	161.89	34,337
Mandini	54304	10.05	3,944
Mathonsi	54305	68.93	21,692
Ntunzini	54306	28.32	2,412
Sikhonyane	54307	99.53	30,125
Sundumbili	54308	8.76	24,299
Tugela Mouth	54310	0.59	210
Tugela	54309	12.46	4,170
Umlalazi Nature Reserve	54311	4.26	0

== Politics ==
The municipal council consists of thirty-five members elected by mixed-member proportional representation. Eighteen councillors are elected by first-past-the-post voting in eighteen wards, while the remaining seventeen are chosen from party lists so that the total number of party representatives is proportional to the number of votes received.

In the election of 4 November 2026 the uMkhonto weSizwe Party (MKP) won a plurality of seventeen seats on the council.

The following table shows the results of the 2026 election.

Party	Ward			List			Total seats
Party	Votes	%	Seats	Votes	%	Seats	Total seats
uMkhonto weSizwe Party	22,105	47.84	16	22,696	49.13	1	17
African National Congress	10,101	21.86	0	9,860	21.34	8	8
Inkatha Freedom Party	9,956	21.55	2	9,630	20.85	6	8
Economic Freedom Fighters	1,234	2.67	0	1,172	2.54	1	1
Democratic Alliance	1,094	2.37	0	1,109	2.40	1	1
10 other parties	1,713	3.71	0	1,727	3.74	0	0
Total	46,203	100.00	18	46,194	100.00	17	35
Valid votes	46,203	98.64		46,194	98.67		
Invalid/blank votes	635	1.36		622	1.33		
Total votes	46,838	100.00		46,816	100.00		
Registered voters/turnout	84,921	55.15		84,921	55.13		

== Corruption and assassination ==
On 31 January 2025, African National Congress councillor Phendukani Mabhida wrote to the regional executive exposing corruption in the Mandeni municipality. Mabhida was assassinated hours before he was due to appear at a meeting to further address these concerns.
