= EMacambini =

eMacambini
- Location within KwaZulu-Natal Location within South Africa
- Coordinates: 29.128°S 31.566°E
- Country: South Africa
- Province: KwaZulu-Natal
- District: iLembe
- Municipality: Mandeni

Area
  - Total: 155.68 km^{2} (60.11 sq mi)

Population (2011)
  - Total: 32,322
  - Density: 207.62/km^{2} (537.73/sq mi)

Racial makeup (2011)
  - Black African: 99.6%
  - Coloured: 0.2%
  - Indian/Asian: 0.1%
  - White: 0.1%

First languages (2011)
  - Zulu: 95.2%
  - S. Ndebele: 1.5%
  - English: 1.0%
  - Other: 2.3%
- Time zone: UTC+2 (SAST)

eMacambini is a rural area in the KwaZulu-Natal province of South Africa which is mostly populated by members of the Macambini clan name which is also Mathaba surname. It is near Mandeni and Gingindlovu on the Zululand coast, just north of Durban and close to the new King Shaka International Airport.

== Threatened eviction ==
In November 2008, the community of eMacambini held a 5,000 strong march of about 10 km to protest against the proposed AmaZulu World development slated to be built by Ruwaad Holdings from Dubai. Earlier in the year, Ruwaad had signed a memorandum of understanding (MOU) with KZN Premier S’bu Ndebele. The planned R44m development by Ruwaad would have occupied 16,500ha. In addition to the AmaZulu World Theme Park, plans included the largest shopping mall in Africa, a game reserve, six golf courses, residential facilities, sports fields and a statue of Shaka at the Thukela river mouth. To achieve this, the proposed development necessitated that the eMacambini community be displaced from their rural land and rehoused on less land in a suburban township. If the plan went ahead, 29 schools, 300 churches, three clinics and brand-new (RDP) houses would have been demolished.Especially relevant to the community was the proposal to demolishing ancestral graves. In all, between 20,000 and 50,000 people in the region would have been forcibly removed if the plan had gone ahead.

== Protest ==
On 4 December 2008, the eMacambini community blocked the N2 and R102 freeways to protest S'bu Ndebele's non-reply to their memorandum handed over in a previous march. Police came in response with rubber bullets injuring about 50 people and arresting 10. There were reports that many shot were innocent bystanders pulled out of their homes. There are also reports that many of the 10 people arrested were refused medical treatment. Police have justified their actions by claiming that residents threw stones at oncoming cars. As a result of the road blockades the deal was called off and the people remain on their land.

== Support ==
The community worked closely with The Poor People's Alliance, and, in particular the shack dwellers' movement Abahlali baseMjondolo, and also lodged a complaint with the South African Human Rights Commission.

On 16 January 2008 the Centre on Housing Rights and Evictions in Geneva issued an open letter to S'bu Ndebele strongly condemning the proposed evictions and the violent police response to protests against it.

== See also ==
- Stockpile of information on eMacambini/AmaZulu World evictions
- eMacambini from Google Earth
- Film on eMacambini
