= Mthokozisi Nxumalo =

South African politician (1989–2021)

Member of the National Assembly of South Africa
- In office 22 May 2019 – 1 August 2021

National Chairperson of the IFP Youth Brigade
- In office 14 July 2019 – 1 August 2021
- Preceded by: Mkhuleko Hlengwa
- Succeeded by: Vacant

Personal details
- Born: Mthokozisi Nkululeko Nxumalo; 7 January 1989 Vryheid, Natal Province, South Africa
- Died: 1 August 2021 (aged 32) Nongoma, KwaZulu-Natal, South Africa
- Party: Inkatha Freedom Party
- Domestic partner: Nozipho Mpungose (engaged)
- Children: 2
- Occupation: Member of Parliament
- Profession: Politician

Mthokozisi Nkululeko Nxumalo (7 January 1989 – 1 August 2021) was a South African politician who was a Member of the National Assembly from May 2019 until his death in August 2021. A member of the Inkatha Freedom Party, he was the National Chairperson of the Inkatha Freedom Party Youth Brigade from July 2019 until his death. Nxumalo formerly served as president of the South African Democratic Students Movement, the IFP's student wing.

== Early life and education ==
Nxxumalo was born in Vryheid on 7 January 1989. His mother was Junerose Mkwanazi. Nxumalo studied construction management at the Mangosuthu University of Technology.

== Political career ==
In August 2011, Nxumalo was elected president of the Inkatha Freedom Party's student wing, the South African Democratic Students Movement (Sadesmo).

In July 2019, he defeated Andile Biyela to become the next national chairperson of the IFP Youth Brigade, succeeding Mkhuleko Hlengwa.

== Parliamentary career ==
In 2019, he stood for election to the National Assembly as 6th on the Inkatha Freedom Party's regional list. At the election, Nxumalo won a seat in the National Assembly. He was sworn in as an MP on 22 May 2019. He was the youngest IFP MP.

Nxumalo served on the Portfolio Committees for Public Works and Infrastructure, and Higher Education, Science and Technology, and previously served on the Portfolio Committee on Mineral Resources and Energy. In January 2021, he was appointed deputy chief whip of the IFP parliamentary caucus.

During a question and answer session in the National Assembly on 10 March 2021, Nxumalo expressed support for protesting students, who demanded free tertiary education. He said that they were demanding “what is rightfully theirs”, and cautioned the Minister of Higher Education, Science and Technology of South Africa, Blade Nzimande that more students would start protesting due to the lack of assistance from the National Student Financial Aid Scheme (NSFAS). On 17 March 2021, Nxumalo mocked deputy president David Mabuza for not being visible enough during the COVID-19 pandemic in 2020.

== Personal life and death ==
Nxumalo was engaged to Nozipho Mpungose. He had two children, Thandolwethu and Qhawe.

Nxumalo died in a car accident in Nongoma on 1 August 2021.

== See also ==
- List of members of the National Assembly of South Africa who died in office

Party political offices
Preceded by Mkhuleko Hlengwa	National Chairperson of the IFP Youth Brigade; 2019–2021	Succeeded by TBD
