= Xolani Ngwezi =

South African politician

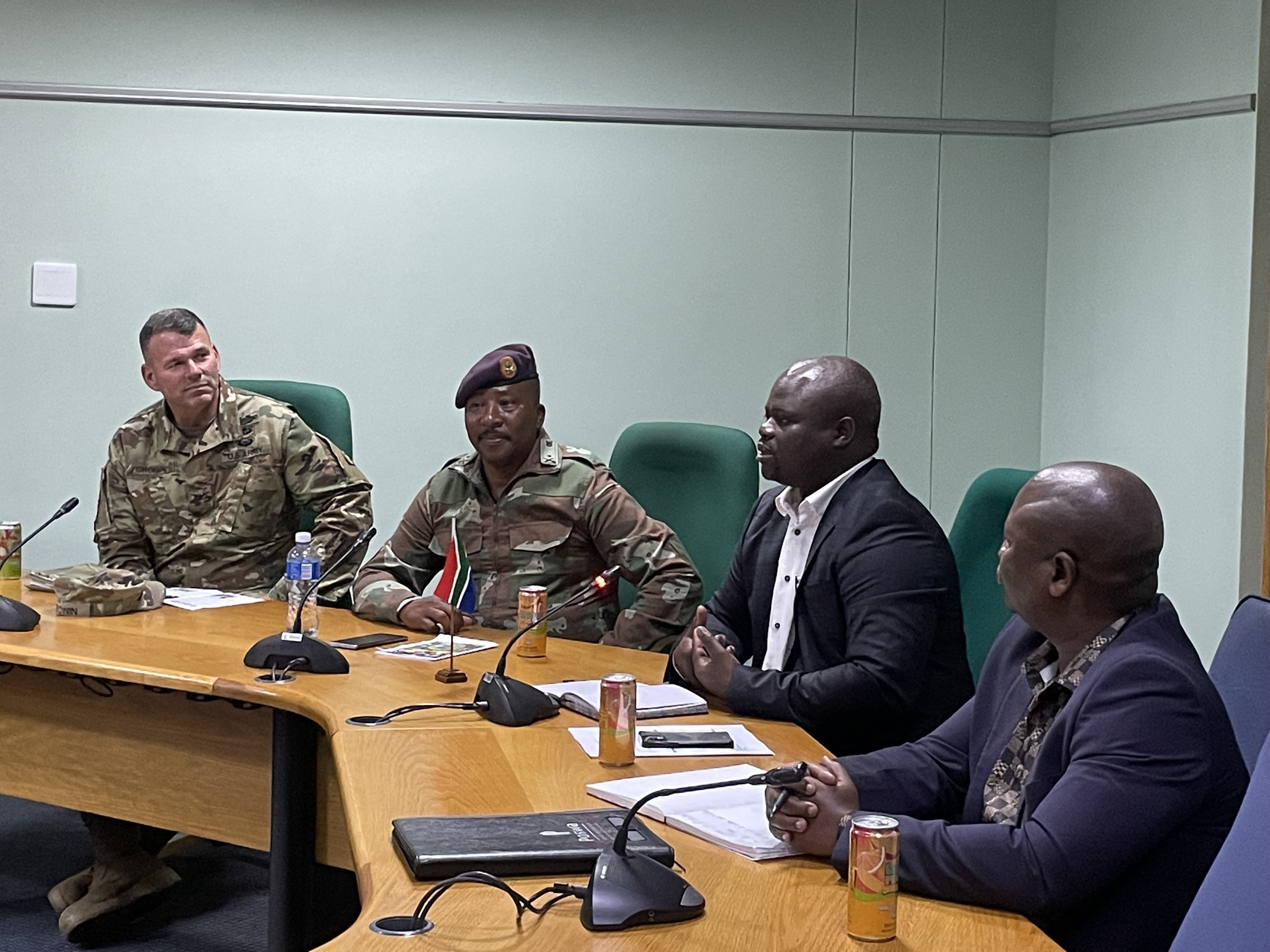
- Ngwezi (3rd from left)

Mayor of the uMhlathuze Local Municipality
- Incumbent
- Assumed office 10 December 2021
- Preceded by: Dr Nkonzoyakhe Dando

Permanent delegate to the National Council of Provinces
- In office 19 February 2021 – 8 December 2021

Member of the National Assembly of South Africa
- In office 15 July 2019 – 11 January 2021
- Preceded by: Albert Mncwango

Personal details
- Born: Xolani Ngwezi
- Party: Inkatha Freedom Party
- Occupation: Member of Parliament
- Profession: Politician

Xolani Ngwezi is a South African politician of the Inkatha Freedom Party who has since been serving as the mayor of the uMhlathuze Local Municipality since December 2021. He was a Member of the National Assembly from June 2017 until January 2021 and served as a permanent delegate to the National Council of Provinces from KwaZulu-Natal from February 2021 until December 2021.

== Political career ==
Ngwezi was ranked 15th on the Inkatha Freedom Party's list of candidates for the 2014 KwaZulu-Natal Legislature election. He was not elected as the party won nine seats.

On 15 June 2017, Ngwezi entered the National Assembly as a replacement for Albert Mncwango. He was assigned to serve on the following portfolio committees: basic education, cooperative governance and traditional affairs and labour.

Prior to the 8 May 2019 general election, Ngwezi was placed 3rd on the IFP's regional-to-national list. He was elected to a full term that commenced on 22 May 2019. In June 2019, he was named to the employment and labour, human settlements, water and sanitation portfolio committees.

Ngwezi resigned from the National Assembly on 11 January 2021. He was then elected to the National Council of Provinces as the IFP's sole permanent delegate from KwaZulu-Natal.

On 8 December 2021, the newly elected IFP Mayor of the uMhlathuze Local Municipality Dr Nkonzoyakhe Donda resigned to make way for Ngwezi. The IFP leadership had initially wanted Ngwezi to become mayor but Ngwezi was not on the party's PR candidate list and because the IEC did not allow PR lists to be changed during the period of the creation of municipal councils after the local government elections on November 1, 2021, Dr Donda was chosen to be the caretaker mayor until PR lists could be amended so that Ngwezi could become a councillor. In early-December, the IEC officially allowed parties' PR lists to be amended. Ngwezi resigned from the NCOP on 8 December 2021. On 10 December 2021, Ngwezi was sworn in as a councillor of the uMhlathuze municipality. He was then elected as an Executive Committee (EXCO) member before he was elected mayor.
