= Albert Mncwango =

South African politician

Deputy Secretary-General of the Inkatha Freedom Party
- Incumbent
- Assumed office August 2019
- Secretary: Siphosethu Ngcobo

Member of the National Assembly
- In office 9 May 1994 – 15 June 2017
- Constituency: KwaZulu-Natal

Personal details
- Born: Mangaqa Albert Mncwango; 19 August 1953 (age 72)
- Citizenship: South Africa
- Party: Inkatha Freedom Party
- Spouse: Nelisiwe Mncwango

Mangaqa Albert Mncwango (born 19 August 1953) is a South African politician from KwaZulu-Natal. He represented the Inkatha Freedom Party (IFP) in the National Assembly for 23 years from 1994 to 2017. After that, he served as Mayor of Nongoma, his hometown, from 2017 to 2023. He is currently the deputy secretary-general of the IFP.

Mncwango was a founding member of the IFP in 1975 and first joined its Central Committee in 1980. He served as the party's national organiser from 1998 to 2012, in which capacity he was in charge of election campaigning. He was deputy chairperson of the party from 2012 until 2019, when he was elected to his current position as deputy secretary-general.

== Early life and career ==
Mncwango was born on 19 August 1953. He was a founding member of Inkatha (later restyled as the IFP) in 1975 and served in its Youth Brigade. He was also regional chairperson of the party's branch in Nongoma from 1978 until 1980, when he was elected as a member of the party's Central Committee for the first time.

He was a member of the party's delegation to the Convention for a Democratic South Africa (CODESA), which negotiated the end of apartheid; He was also a longtime induna of the Zulu King, Goodwill Zwelithini; when Inkatha president Mangosuthu Buthelezi boycotted CODESA to protest Zwelithini's exclusion, Mncwango suggested that he was prepared to order Zwelithini's personal regiment into "war" with the other negotiating parties.

== National Assembly: 1994–2017 ==
In South Africa's first post-apartheid elections in 1994, Mncwango was elected to represent the IFP in the National Assembly. He served five-and-a-half terms in his seat: he was elected to his sixth and final term in the 2014 general election, ranked first on the IFP's regional party list for KwaZulu-Natal, and he retired on 15 June 2017, ceding his place to Xolani Ngwezi.

Mncwango was viewed as a "party loyalist", in the Mail & Guardian's phrase, or as a "firebrand", in the phrase of opposition leader Tony Leon. Among the attacks launched by Mncwango on his party's behalf was a dismissal of the Truth and Reconciliation Commission and its head, Archbishop Desmond Tutu, as a "sensationalist circus of horrors presided over by a weeping clown". During the same parliamentary debate, held in 2003, Mncwango claimed that the leadership of the governing party, the African National Congress (ANC), had conspired to assassinate IFP president Buthelezi during apartheid.

=== Nongoma ===
In the late 1990s, including around the time of the 1999 general election, Mncwango's hometown of Nongoma in KwaZulu-Natal was a focal point for political violence between the IFP and governing ANC. Mncwango led the IFP in the area and stringently denied that IFP supporters were responsible for the violence or for intimidating ANC members and electoral officials; indeed, he tended to suggest that there was barely any political contest in the area, which he said was "99.99% IFP". Mncwango himself reportedly had a complement of bodyguards.

When ANC parliamentarian Bheki Mkhize was murdered in nearby Ulundi in 2000, the provincial minister for safety and security, Bheki Cele of the ANC, was highly critical of Mncwango and his attitude towards the violence, saying:

The IFP must be honest with themselves, and take a close look at Mncwango. He says there is no ANC in Nongoma, but he is wrong. His belief could cause a dangerous reaction to the ANC... There is tremendous intolerance towards the ANC in Nongoma. The IFP must discipline its ranks, just in the same way we will need to discipline any rogue elements we find within our party.

=== Rape trial ===
In the aftermath of the 2004 general election, media reported that Mncwango had been convicted on a charge of rape in September 2003. A magistrate had found him guilty of raping his former girlfriend at an apartment in Ulundi on 17 September 2000. The IFP had been aware of the conviction but had not reported it to Parliament or to the public, which IFP chief whip Koos van der Merwe explained by saying:

Our lawyers have made it clear that the magistrate erred in convicting him. We are convinced that the high court will set [the conviction] aside... Of course we are concerned about rape victims. But in this instance they were lovers for a long period. She is not a real rape victim. We were not prepared to sacrifice a man for six months or a year.

Mncwango's sentencing was delayed as the case was referred from the magistrate to the high court and then back to the magistrate. On 2 August 2004, the magistrate sentenced him to ten years' imprisonment. He was denied leave to appeal. The IFP announced that it had suspended him from all his positions, despite its "greatest appreciation for the sterling work of Mr Mncwango and his unquestioned loyalty to the party".

Mncwango served 19 days in prison before his lawyers succeeded in petitioning the judge president to grant him leave to appeal. The Pietermaritzburg High Court ruled on the appeal in May 2005 and overturned the conviction. Mncwango alleged that the rape complaint could have been "a political setup" aimed at weakening the IFP's popularity in Nongoma; he claimed that the complainant was a member of the ANC and pointed out that he had been arrested shortly before the 2000 local elections. Conversely, the ANC's provincial spokesman in KwaZulu-Natal, Mtholephi Mthimkhulu, said that the ANC believed that the conviction had been overturned based on a "loophole" and called for the National Prosecuting Authority to re-prosecute the case.

=== IFP national organiser ===
In 1998, IFP president Buthelezi appointed Mncwango as the party's national organiser, an office which he went on to hold for over a decade. In this capacity, he led the IFP's campaign strategy and machinery in the 2004 general election and 2009 general election.

On 10 January 2012, Mncwango announced that he had resigned as national organiser. He said that the IFP leadership had asked him to do so "in order to allow the party to implement certain transformational changes". In response, the IFP said that Mncwango had unfortunately "jumped the gun": although the party leadership was considering professionalising the position of national organiser, the final decision had not yet been taken. By the end of the week, the party confirmed that Mncwango had been replaced as national organiser – by a party employee, rather than another politician – and therefore would also be fall off the party's national executive committee. However, he remained an ordinary IFP member and Member of Parliament.

=== IFP deputy chairperson ===
According to the Witness, Mncwango's resignation as national organiser in 2012 fostered speculation that he was "seen as a threat" to Buthelezi. Indeed, since 2007 or earlier, Mncwango – along with Musa Zondi and Zanele Magwaza-Msibi – had been viewed as a leading contender to succeed Buthelezi as IFP president. He was expected to support a moderate programme, broadly continuous with Buthelezi's, and during this period he did not have the support of the IFP Youth Brigade.

At the IFP's 34th national general conference, held in Ulundi in September 2012, Mncwango was elected to one of the party's top offices as deputy national chairperson of the IFP, deputising Blessed Gwala. He remained in that position until the party's next elective conference was held in 2019. Although no longer bearing the title of national organiser, Mcwango led the IFP's campaign machinery during the 2014 general election.

== Mayor of Nongoma: 2017–2023 ==
Mncwango left Parliament in 2017 in order to take up office as mayor of Nongoma Local Municipality, his hometown. He held the office until 2023. During that time, in August 2019, he was elected as deputy secretary-general of the IFP at the party's 35th national general conference. In that capacity he deputised Siphosethu Ngcobo. In March 2021, he was suspended from his party office for 30 days on the basis of a video recording of a speech he made at a party meeting in Jozini. Though the video was not made public, the IFP leadership said that they were concerned about some of the comments Mncwango had made, reportedly about Buthelezi.

Although Mncwango was re-elected as mayor in the 2021 local elections, it lost its majority in the municipality and henceforth governed through a fragile coalition with the Economic Freedom Fighters (EFF). The coalition collapsed in early 2023. After one false start – in which a council meeting was stormed by IFP supporters and had to be cancelled – Mncwango was removed from the mayoral office in February 2023. The EFF, ANC, and National Freedom Party (NFP) voted together to remove him and replace him with a mayor from the NFP. Mncwango remained an ordinary member of the council.

== Personal life ==
=== Sanelisiwe Mncwango's defection: 2011 ===
He is married to Sanelisiwe (Nelisiwe) Mncwango. She is a former deputy chairperson of the IFP Women's Brigade and as of 2011, she was director of community services at Nongoma municipality. In March of that year, the NFP announced that she had resigned from the IFP in order to join the NFP, which had recently been founded as a breakaway party. Mncwango, who was national organiser at the time, strongly denied the claim, saying that it was false, an "early April Fool's joke", and "wishful thinking" on the NFP's part. However, photographic evidence showed Nelisiwe wearing an IFP shirt and signing her membership forms. Thereafter Mncwango refused to comment, though he continued to insist that defections to the NFP had "rid the IFP of deadwood".

Just three days after the initial announcement, Nelisiwe's lawyer released a statement in which she said that she was resigning from the NFP with immediate effect. She said:

I acted out of extreme anger. My sober judgment was impaired by my emotions, which resulted in the biggest mistake of my life... I would like to unconditionally apologise to my husband, to my children and family for the pain and tension I have caused... I regret that my decision had caused so much negative publicity and damage to the image of the IFP."

Mncwango defended his wife afterwards, saying that she had not fully understood the consequences of her actions.
