= Mlaba =

Mlaba is a South African surname. Notable people with the surname include:

- Nonkululeko Mlaba (born 2000), South African cricketer
- Obed Mlaba (born 1943), South African politician
- Wandile Mlaba (born 2005), South African rugby union player
- Zibuse Mlaba (1955–2021), South African politician
