= Nomakiki Majola =

South African politician

Nomakiki Majola MPL

Member of the KwaZulu-Natal Provincial Legislature
- Incumbent
- Assumed office 30 June 2016
- In office April 2009 – May 2014

Personal details
- Citizenship: South Africa
- Party: African National Congress

Nomakiki Roseline Majola is a South African politician who has represented the African National Congress (ANC) in the KwaZulu-Natal Provincial Legislature since June 2016. She formerly served in the provincial legislature from 2009 to 2014.

== Political career ==
Majola represented the ANC in the provincial legislature from 2009 to 2014, but in the 2014 general election was ranked 56th on the ANC's provincial party list and did not initially secure re-election to a seat. She subsequently worked as a senior manager in the provincial Department of Health until 30 June 2016, when she was sworn back in to the legislature to fill a casual vacancy. She and Sifiso Sonjica replaced Mike Mabuyakhulu and Peggy Nkonyeni, who had resigned from their legislative seats after being sacked from the KwaZulu-Natal Executive Council.

She was re-elected to a full term in the legislature in the 2019 general election, ranked 32nd on the ANC's party list. In July 2022, she was elected to a four-year term on the Provincial Executive Committee of the ANC's KwaZulu-Natal branch.
