= Warren Britz =

South African rugby union player

- Full name: Warren Kenneth Britz
- Born: 7 November 1973 (age 53) Durban, South Africa
- Height: 6 ft 3 in (191 cm)
- Weight: 226 lb (103 kg)

Rugby union career
- Position: Flanker
International career
Years	Team	Apps	(Points)
2002	South Africa	1	(0)

Warren Kenneth Britz (born 7 November 1973) is a South African former rugby union international.

Britz grew up in Natal and attended Port Shepstone High School, south of Durban.

A Natal Sharks player, Britz was capped in one Test match for the Springboks, as a flanker against Wales at Free State Stadium in 2002. He had previously played for the national rugby seven team, including for the 2001 World Cup.

Britz left South Africa in 2003 to take up a contract with the Newcastle Falcons and played in the 2003–04 Powergen Cup-winning side. After two years in England, Britz returned home and in 2007 was a member of the Sharks side which were beaten by the Bulls in the Super 14 final, to a Bryan Habana injury-time try. He finished his playing career with two seasons at Montpellier in the Top 14, then became the French club's head coach.

== See also ==
- List of South Africa national rugby union players
