= Vusi Ximba =

South African comic musician

Vusumuzi Ximba
- Born: October 13, 1939; Mandeni, South Africa
- Died: February 2, 2011 (aged 71); KwaSwayimane, Pietermaritzburg, South Africa
- Genres: Folk
- Occupations: musician; songwriter; comedian; satirist; accordionist
- Instrument: Accordion
- Years active: 1970–2011
- Labels: Sony Music Entertainment Africa

Vusi Ximba (October 13, 1939 – February 2, 2011) was a South African musician, songwriter and comedian and satirist best known for his comic style of music and skit-like performances.

He was born and raised in Mandeni, north of KwaZulu-Natal. He later moved to KwaSwayimane in Pietermaritzburg where he stayed until his death on 2 February 2011.

== Controversy and banning ==
At the height of his career, he was met with controversies relating to the use of indecent language in his music and skit performances. The SABC decided to ban most of his songs from radio stations like Ukhozi FM, which was the only station that could play his genre at that time.

== Discography ==
- Therelina (1997)
- Umthandazi Ejoyintini (1998)
- Govozile EP (2020, posthumous released)
