= Mkhuleko Hlengwa =

South African politician (born 1987)

The Honourable Mkhuleko Hlengwa MP
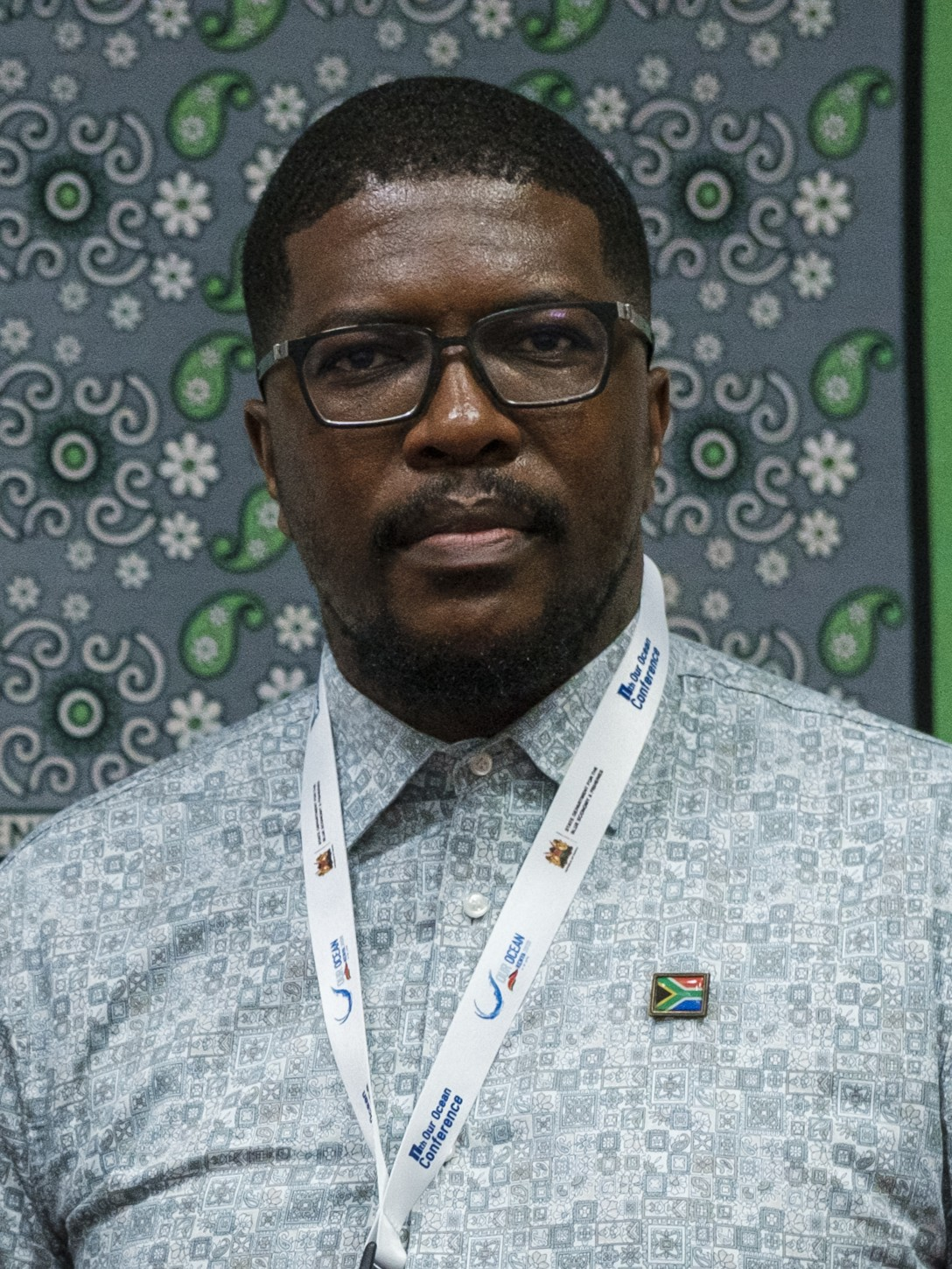
- Hlengwa in 2026

Deputy Minister of Transport
- Incumbent
- Assumed office 3 July 2024
- President: Cyril Ramaphosa
- Minister: Barbara Creecy
- Preceded by: Lisa Mangcu

Chairperson of the Standing Committee on Public Accounts
- In office 2 July 2019 – 28 May 2024
- Preceded by: Themba Godi
- Succeeded by: Songezi Zibi

Member of the National Assembly
- Incumbent
- Assumed office 8 May 2012
- Constituency: KwaZulu-Natal (2012–2019)

National Chairperson of the Inkatha Freedom Party Youth Brigade
- In office March 2011 – July 2019
- Preceded by: Pat Lebenya-Ntanzi
- Succeeded by: Mthokozisi Nxumalo

Personal details
- Born: 12 June 1987 (age 39) Mfume, eThekwini; Natal Province, South Africa
- Party: Inkatha Freedom Party
- Parent: Mhlabunzima Hlengwa (father)
- Education: Port Shepstone High School
- Alma mater: University of KwaZulu-Natal; University of South Africa

Mkhuleko Hlengwa (born 12 June 1987) is a South African politician who became the Deputy Minister of Transport in July 2024. He is the national spokesperson of the Inkatha Freedom Party (IFP) and has represented the party in the National Assembly since May 2012.

Born in KwaZulu-Natal, Hlengwa rose to national prominence as the chairperson of Parliament's Standing Committee on Public Accounts during the Sixth Parliament. Under his leadership the committee investigated the effects of state capture on state-owned enterprises. Before that, Hlengwa was the chairperson of the IFP Youth Brigade between March 2011 and July 2019. He was appointed as the IFP's spokesperson in July 2018.

== Early life and education ==
Born on 12 June 1987, Hlengwa was born in Mfume, a rural area near Umgababa on the South Coast of the former Natal Province; it is now part of southern eThekwini in KwaZulu-Natal. He later described himself as "umfana wasemakhaya" (Zulu for "a village boy"). His father, Mhlabunzima Hlengwa, was a Zulu traditional leader in the region and represented the Inkatha Freedom Party (IFP) in Parliament from 1994 to 2004.

Hlengwa matriculated in 2005 at the Port Shepstone High School. He enrolled at the University of KwaZulu-Natal to study political science and community development, but he did not graduate. He later re-enrolled through the University of South Africa and completed his bachelor's degree. In 2016 he was the top student in his cohort at the Wits School of Governance, where he completed a postgraduate certificate in governance and leadership.

Hlengwa is also the nephew to KwaZulu-Natal MEC for Sports, Arts and Culture Mntomuhle Khawula, who himself has served previously amongst others as the IFP Youth Brigade National Chairperson.

== Early political career ==
As a student Hlengwa followed his father into politics, ultimately becoming the national spokesperson of the IFP-affiliated South African Democratic Students' Movement (Sadesmo). While he was in that position, in March 2011, he succeeded Pat Lebenya-Ntanzi as national chairperson of the party's youth wing, the IFP Youth Brigade. He was elected at the brigade's national conference in Ulundi after the most popular nominee, Thabo Xaba, withdrew from contention at the request of the IFP's national leadership.

During his first six months as Youth Brigade chairperson, Hlengwa threatened to make eThekwini "ungovernable" in protest of Mayor James Nxumalo's decision to rename the Mangosuthu Highway to honour Griffiths Mxenge; until then, the road had been named after long-serving IFP president Mangosuthu Buthelezi. Hlengwa remained a supporter of Buthelezi in later years, and he considered Buthelezi a political mentor.

Hlengwa also serves as a Trustee on the Board of the Prince Mangosuthu Buthelezi Foundation since its founding in 2022. https://thebuthelezifoundation.org.za/trustees/

== Career in government ==
=== Ordinary Member of Parliament: 2012–2019 ===
On 8 May 2012, Hlengwa was sworn in to an IFP seat in the National Assembly, the lower house of the South African Parliament. He filled the casual vacancy in the KwaZulu-Natal caucus that arose when Musa Zondi resigned. Not yet 25, he succeeded Geordin Hill-Lewis as the youngest Member of Parliament. Still the leader of the IFP Youth Brigade, he said that he viewed himself as the parliamentary representative of the youth. He served on the Portfolio Committee on Economic Development and Portfolio Committee on Sport and Recreation.

In the May 2014 general election, Hlengwa was re-elected to his first full term in his parliamentary seat. He remained the IFP's youngest representative, as well as one of the youngest politicians in Parliament. During the Fifth Parliament, he sat on several committees, most notably the Portfolio Committee on International Relations and Cooperation, the Standing Committee on Finance, and the high-profile Standing Committee on Public Accounts (SCOPA). Max du Preez said that he distinguished himself as "among the brightest and most hard working" politicians in the National Assembly.

In July 2015, Hlengwa caused a minor controversy when he questioned Nelson Mandela's lionisation, reportedly arguing that "Mandela did not free me" during a youth summit in Ulundi. Isolezwe quoted him as having said that Mandela "was not there during the struggle, he was serving 27 years in jail. Then if he was incarcerated, how can he free people?" He suggested that it was Buthelezi who had freed Mandela. His remarks were criticised on social media; Vusi Dube labelled them "stupid" and Jomo Sibiya lamented his "impoverished" thinking.

Hlengwa was appointed as national spokesperson of the IFP in July 2018, a promotion which observers said signalled that he was being groomed for higher office. His immediate task in the aftermath of his appointment was to front the IFP's campaign in the upcoming general election.

=== Chairperson of SCOPA: 2019–2024 ===
Hlengwa was elected to a third term in the National Assembly in the general election of May 2019, ranked third on the IFP's national party list. In the aftermath of the election, on 21 June 2019, the IFP announced that it had been invited by the governing African National Congress (ANC) to take over the chair of SCOPA. The party nominated Hlengwa for the position due to his experience in the committee. The Mail & Guardian reported that the ANC had extended the offer in exchange for the IFP's support in hung municipalities, especially the City of Johannesburg, but Hlengwa denied this, saying that the IFP had accepted the offer for principled reasons and that "I am certainly not a lackey".

At its first meeting on 2 July 2019, SCOPA formally elected Hlengwa, unopposed, as chairperson of the committee. Later in July, the IFP Youth Brigade held its first national conference since March 2011; Hlengwa did not stand for re-election as the brigade's chairperson, and he was succeeded in that office by Mthokozisi Nxumalo.

Upon taking up the SCOPA chair, Hlengwa committed to enforcing accountability for state capture through Parliament's subpoena power, an alliance with the Auditor-General, refusal to "walk on eggshells", and possible legislative change. He said that the committee would focus particularly on the state-owned enterprises, which he called government's "problem children". However, his critics, such as activist Zackie Achmat, said that under Hlengwa's leadership SCOPA underperformed in investigating state capture.

The most high-profile incident during Hlengwa's tenure was an April 2022 meeting between SCOPA and the board of Eskom, during which Hlengwa clashed with Busi Mavuso, a businesswoman and board member. After Mavuso criticised the ANC for its role in the ongoing energy crisis, Hlengwa told Mavuso to "behave yourself or excuse yourself from this meeting", and she promptly walked out. The Sunday Times labelled Hlengwa its "mampara of the week", and commentators accused Hlengwa of misogyny. The opposition Democratic Alliance called for Nosiviwe Mapisa-Nqakula, the Speaker of the National Assembly, to suspend Hlengwa and refer his conduct to the Powers and Privileges Committee for a full disciplinary inquiry; opposition chief whip Natasha Mazzone slammed Hlengwa's rudeness and said that, "Given his total partiality toward the ANC in his conduct, it appears that Hlengwa takes his instructions on Eskom matters from the ANC." After meeting with the IFP's national leadership on the matter, Hlengwa released a statement apologising to Mavuso and acknowledging that "the situation could have been handled better".

=== Deputy Minister of Transport: since 2024 ===
In the May 2024 general election, Hlengwa was re-elected to his parliamentary seat, again ranked third on the IFP's national party list. In the coalition negotiations that followed the election, he continued as IFP spokesman and also served on the party's negotiating team. The IFP signed a coalition agreement with the ANC and, announcing his third cabinet on 30 June 2024, the ANC's President Cyril Ramaphosa named Hlengwa as Deputy Minister of Transport. In that capacity he deputises Minister Barbara Creecy of the ANC. Songezo Zibi was elected to succeed him as SCOPA chairperson.

== Personal life ==
Hlengwa has one son. Between 2017 and 2019, several anonymous Twitter accounts were created to accuse Hlengwa of physically assaulting an alleged former lover.
