= Sifiso Sonjica =

South African politician

Sifiso Sonjica MPL

Member of the KwaZulu-Natal Provincial Legislature
- Incumbent
- Assumed office 30 June 2016

Personal details
- Citizenship: South Africa
- Party: African National Congress

Sifiso Musawenkosi Sonjica is a South African politician who has represented the African National Congress (ANC) in the KwaZulu-Natal Provincial Legislature since 2016. He was formerly a businessman and a leader of the ANC Youth League in KwaZulu-Natal.

== Political career ==
Sonjica was formerly active in the ANC Youth League and served as the Provincial Chairperson of the league's KwaZulu-Natal branch in the early 2000s. In 2012, he contested unsuccessfully for election as Regional Chairperson of the ANC's eThekwini branch, running against Sibongiseni Dhlomo and Nhlakanipho Ntombela; Sonjica withdrew from the race, which was ultimately won by Dhlomo.

In the 2014 general election, Sonjica stood as a candidate for election to the KwaZulu-Natal Provincial Legislature but was ranked 57th on the ANC's provincial party list and did not immediately secure election to a seat. He worked as a businessman until 30 June 2016, when he was sworn in to the legislature to fill a casual vacancy. He and Nomakiki Majola replaced Mike Mabuyakhulu and Peggy Nkonyeni, who had resigned from their legislative seats after being sacked from the KwaZulu-Natal Executive Council. He was elected to his first full term in the legislature in the 2019 general election, ranked 42nd on the ANC's party list.
