= Mhlabunzima Hlengwa =

South African politician and Zulu traditional leader (1945–2005)

Deputy Speaker of the KwaZulu-Natal Legislature
- In office 23 April 2004 – 16 March 2005
- Premier: S'bu Ndebele
- Speaker: Willies Mchunu

Member of the National Assembly
- In office May 1994 – April 2004
- Constituency: KwaZulu-Natal

Personal details
- Born: 13 March 1945
- Died: 16 March 2005 (aged 60) KwaThoyana, eThekwini; KwaZulu-Natal, South Africa
- Citizenship: South Africa
- Party: Inkatha Freedom Party
- Children: Mkhuleko Hlengwa

Inkosi Mhlabunzima Wellington Hlengwa (13 March 1945 – 16 March 2005) was a South African politician and Zulu traditional leader who served as Deputy Speaker of the KwaZulu-Natal Provincial Legislature until his death in March 2005. Before assuming that office in 2004, Hlengwa represented his political party, the Inkatha Freedom Party (IFP), in the National Assembly from 1994 to 2004. He was also the chief of KwaThoyana Tribal Authority near Umbumbulu in eThekwini, KwaZulu-Natal, a position to which he was appointed in 1988.

== Life and career ==
Hlengwa was born on 13 March 1945. He was the traditional leader of the KwaThoyana Tribal Authority near Umbumbulu on the South Coast of the former Natal province, a rural area that later became part of KwaZulu-Natal's eThekwini Metropolitan Municipality. He assumed the chieftaincy, a hereditary life-long position, on 13 April 1988 after his father, Charles Hlengwa, died.

In the 1994 general election, South Africa's first under universal suffrage, Hlengwa was elected to represent the IFP in the National Assembly, the lower house of the post-apartheid South African Parliament. He served two terms in the assembly, gaining re-election in 1999, and represented the KwaZulu-Natal constituency. In the next general election in 2004, he was elected to an IFP seat in the KwaZulu-Natal Provincial Legislature, where he was appointed as Deputy Speaker; he remained in that office until his death. He was particularly involved in HIV/AIDS advocacy during South Africa's HIV/AIDS epidemic.

== Personal life and death ==
Hlengwa was married and had children. One of his sons, Nhlosoyesizwe McMillan Hlengwa, took over his chieftaincy; another, Mkhuleko Hlengwa, is also an IFP politician. One of his wives was Andile Gumede, who is known for her role in reviving the practice of virginity testing in KwaZulu-Natal in the early 1990s.

Hlengwa died in his sleep on 16 March 2005, days after his 60th birthday.
