= Tugela, KwaZulu-Natal =

Tugela
- Location within KwaZulu-Natal Location within South Africa
- Coordinates: 29.183°S 31.417°E
- Country: South Africa
- Province: KwaZulu-Natal
- District: iLembe
- Municipality: Mandeni

Area
  - Total: 15.61 km^{2} (6.03 sq mi)

Population (2011)
  - Total: 10,492
  - Density: 672.1/km^{2} (1,741/sq mi)

Racial makeup (2011)
  - Black African: 84.1%
  - Coloured: 2.1%
  - Indian/Asian: 13.2%
  - White: 0.4%
  - Other: 0.2%

First languages (2011)
  - Zulu: 78.0%
  - English: 16.7%
  - Sign language: 1.3%
  - S. Ndebele: 1.2%
  - Other: 2.8%
- Time zone: UTC+2 (SAST)
- Postal code (street): 4451
- PO box: 4451

Tugela is a town in Ilembe District Municipality in the KwaZulu-Natal province of South Africa.
