= Roger Burrows =

South African politician and educator (1945–2025)

Member of the Executive Council of KwaZulu-Natal for Economic Development and Tourism
- In office 29 November 2002 – 23 April 2004
- Premier: Lionel Mtshali
- Preceded by: Mike Mabuyakhulu
- Succeeded by: Mike Mabuyakhulu

Member of the KwaZulu-Natal Legislature
- In office 1994–2009

Member of Parliament for Pinetown
- In office 1984–1994
- Succeeded by: Constituency abolished

Personal details
- Born: 8 April 1945
- Died: 14 November 2025 (aged 80)
- Party: Democratic Alliance
- Other political affiliations: Democratic Party; Progressive Federal Party
- Spouse: Sue Burrows
- Profession: Educator, politician

Roger Marshall Burrows (8 April 1945 – 14 November 2025) was a South African politician and educator. A member of multiple political parties, Burrows was elected the Member of Parliament for Pinetown in 1984. He was later elected to the KwaZulu-Natal Legislature for the Democratic Party, which later evolved into the Democratic Alliance. He served a stint in the Executive Council of KwaZulu-Natal as a Member of the Executive Council from 2002 until 2004 before retiring from politics in 2009.

== Early life and career ==
Burrows was born on 8 April 1945. He qualified as a teacher and worked as one for 12 years before serving as the general secretary of the Natal Teachers' Union, now known as the Association of Professional Educators, for four years. In 1984, he was elected to the House of Assembly of South Africa for the Pinetown constituency as a member of the Progressive Federal Party, which later became the Democratic Party in 1989 and then the Democratic Alliance in 2000.

He was elected to the newly established KwaZulu-Natal Legislature in the 1994 general election and re-elected subsequently. He served as the party's caucus leader in the legislature as well as the party's provincial leader. In 1996, he assisted future Democratic Alliance politician Mbali Ntuli's family and Ntuli cited Burrows's values as to why she later decided to join the DA.

On 29 November 2002, Burrows was appointed to the Executive Council, the provincial cabinet of KwaZulu-Natal, as the Member of the Executive Council (MEC) for Economic Development and Tourism by premier Lionel Mtshali of the Inkatha Freedom Party, replacing African National Congress member Mike Mabuyakhulu. The IFP and DA then formed a coalition government to govern the province. He attended his first provincial cabinet meeting in early-December 2002.

As MEC, he supported an industrial strategy for KwaZulu-Natal and emphasised black economic empowerment as well as the development of small, medium and micro enterprises as being a key part of the industrial strategy. He received the Public Service Commission's independent report into allegations of corruption and maladministration made against several senior staff members at the provincial department of economic development and tourism in January 2004. He was not reappointed to the Executive Council following the election that was held later that year and was succeeded by his predecessor, Mike Mabuyakhulu.

Burrows announced his retirement as DA provincial leader ahead of the party's provincial congress in August 2006. As provincial leader of the DA, he grew the party from winning two seats in the 1994 general election to winning seven seats in the 2004 general election. Burrows was described as having social democratic principles instead of the liberal principles that most of the members of the DA caucus in the legislature adhered to.

He continued serving in the provincial legislature until 2009 general election and was succeeded by John Steenhuisen as the leader of the DA caucus in the legislature.

== Personal life and death ==
Burrows was married to Sue, who served as a councillor in the South Central local council in Durban.

Burrows died following a long illness on 14 November 2025, at the age of 80. DA leader John Steenhuisen paid tribute to him.
