= Faith Gasa =

South African politician (1945–2005)

Member of the National Assembly
- In office June 1999 – May 2009

Personal details
- Born: 28 February 1945 Bloemfontein, Orange Free State; Union of South Africa
- Died: 4 August 2005 (aged 60) Richards Bay, KwaZulu-Natal; South Africa
- Party: African National Congress
- Education: University of Zululand

Faith Xolile Gasa (28 February 1945 – 4 August 2005) is a South African politician who was KwaZulu-Natal's Member of the Executive Council (MEC) for Education and Culture from August 2000 to June 2001. She represented the Inkatha Freedom Party (IFP) in the National Assembly from 1994 to 1995 and in the KwaZulu-Natal Legislature from 1995 until her death in 2005. A teacher by profession, she was also a former chairperson of the IFP Women's Brigade.

== Early life and career ==
Gasa was born on 28 February 1945 in Bloemfontein in the former Orange Free State. She completed a nursing diploma in 1967 and went on to complete her undergraduate degree at the University of Zululand in the former Natal province. In 1973, she moved to Vryheid to teach high school; she was later elected life president of the Natal Teachers Union. She was a founding member of Inkatha (later the IFP) in 1975 and later became chairperson of its Women's Brigade. She was also a member of the IFP's delegation the Convention for a Democratic South Africa.

== Legislative career: 1994–2005 ==
In South Africa's first post-apartheid elections in 1994, Gasa was elected to represent the IFP in the National Assembly, the lower house of the new South African Parliament, where she also served as Deputy Chairperson of Committees. In 1995, she left Parliament to join the IFP's caucus in the KwaZulu-Natal Legislature. She served in the legislature until her death, gaining re-election to full consecutive terms in 1999 and 2004. She led the IFP's campaign in the Northern Province in the 1999 election and the Mail & Guardian described her as a "moderate heavyweight" in the party.

=== MEC for Education and Culture: 2000–2001 ===
In August 2000, KwaZulu-Natal Premier Lionel Mtshali appointed Gasa to the KwaZulu-Natal Executive Council as MEC for Education and Culture; she replaced Eileen KaNkosi-Shandu, who was sacked for nepotism. In October of that year, several newspapers reported that Gasa had not reported to the office for three weeks, and Gasa's husband told the press that she had not gone to the office because there was "a common belief that she is being bewitched by Shandu", her predecessor. Mtshali reportedly ordered that the office should be refurbished and repainted. Gasa said that she planned to return to work but sack her entire staff, who she believed remained loyal to KaNkosi-Shandu: the BBC quoted her as saying, "They are all going. By Monday I will have proper staff, not a bunch of reptiles". KaNkosi-Shandu said that she had "no problem with [Gasa]" and that she was "so confused" by the allegation that she did not know how to respond.

On 1 June 2001, Mtshali announced that Gasa had resigned as MEC. IOL reported that she had been under pressure to resign, particularly after she failed to arrive at a legislative sitting in which she was supposed to report to the legislature on the state of her department. The opposition African National Congress agreed, with Mtholephi Mthimkhulu saying, "We do not believe she resigned voluntarily. She was a captain of a sinking ship." Several days later, Gasa denied that she had agreed to resign and demanded to be reinstated. She remained an ordinary Member of the Provincial Legislature after leaving the Executive Council.

== Personal life and death ==
Gasa was hospitalised in 2005 and died several months later on 4 August 2005 in Richards Bay. She was married to Enoch Gasa, whom she had met at university. He predeceased her by several months.
