= Narend Singh =

South African politician (born 1954)

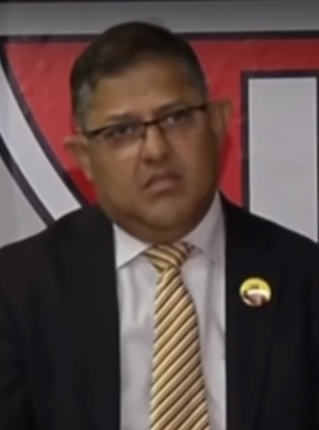
- Singh in May 2019

Deputy Minister of Forestry, Fisheries and the Environment
- Incumbent
- Assumed office 30 June 2024
- President: Cyril Ramaphosa
- Minister: Dion George
- Preceded by: Maggie Sotyu

Treasurer-General of the Inkatha Freedom Party
- Incumbent
- Assumed office 25 August 2019
- President: Velenkosini Hlabisa

Member of the National Assembly of South Africa
- Incumbent
- Assumed office 24 August 2007
- Preceded by: Nhlanhla Zulu
- Constituency: KwaZulu-Natal

Member of the Executive Council of KwaZulu-Natal
- In office April 1997 – March 2006
- Premier: Ben Ngubane; Lionel Mtshali; S'bu Ndebele

Member of the Senate of South Africa (abolished 1997)
- In office 1994–1996

Personal details
- Born: 4 September 1954 (age 71) Umkomaas, Natal Province, South Africa
- Party: Inkatha Freedom Party
- Spouse: Manitha
- Children: 2
- Occupation: Member of Parliament
- Profession: Politician

Narend Singh (born 5 September 1954) is a South African politician who is the chief whip of the Inkatha Freedom Party in the National Assembly and the treasurer-general of the party. Prior to joining the National Assembly in 2007, he was a Member of the Executive Council in the KwaZulu-Natal provincial government from 1997 until 2006 and a member of the Senate from 1994 to 1996.

== Early life and education ==
Singh was born on 5 September 1954 in Umkomaas, Natal Province. He attended Umkomaas Drift Primary and Naidoo Memorial School in the small town of Craigieburn, just outside Umkomaas. In 1971, he started studying towards a Bachelor of Commerce degree from the University of Durban-Westville. He left the university in 1974 to help out at a family business. Singh later completed a postgraduate diploma in Economic Principles from the University of London in 1997. In 2003, he obtained a master's degree in public policy and administration from the university.

In 2019, he received a postgraduate diploma in public policy and African studies from the University of Johannesburg.

== Political career ==
In 1988, Singh was recruited by community members to contest the 1989 House of Delegates election in the Umzinto constituency. He went on to contest the election as a member of the Solidarity Party and won easily. Singh received 5,024 votes. In 1993, he joined the Inkatha Freedom Party. He turned down an offer from Roger Burrows to join the Democratic Party.

Following the first multi-racial elections in 1994, Singh was elected to the Senate as an IFP delegate from KwaZulu-Natal. He served in the Senate until 1996, when the IFP redeployed him to the KwaZulu-Natal Legislature. In April 1997, he was appointed to the province's Executive Council and served on the council until March 2006, when he resigned following a sex scandal. Although the scandal was an embarrassment to the party, the party decided not to expel him.

In August 2007, he was appointed to the National Assembly of South Africa to replace Nhlanhla Zulu, who had died the previous month. Singh has since been re-elected in April 2009, May 2014, May 2019 and May 2024.

Singh was later appointed as the IFP's chief whip in the assembly. He is also the party's treasurer-general.

== Personal life ==
Singh is married to Manitha, and they have two children together.
