= Bonga Mdletshe =

South African politician and traditional leader

Inkosi Bonga Mdletshe

Member of the KwaZulu-Natal Provincial Legislature
- In office 1996 – 6 May 2014

Speaker of the KwaZulu-Natal Provincial Legislature
- In office 1998–2004
- Succeeded by: Willies Mchunu

Personal details
- Born: 15 May 1955 (age 71)
- Party: Inkatha Freedom Party
- Education: University of Zululand

Bonga Nkanyiso Mdletshe (born 15 May 1955 - died 2024) was a South African politician and traditional leader who represented the Inkatha Freedom Party (IFP) in the KwaZulu-Natal Legislature from 1996 to 2014. During this period, he served as Speaker in the legislature from 1998 to 2004. A lawyer by training, he entered politics during apartheid as a member of the government of the former bantustan of KwaZulu.

== Early life and career ==
Mdletshe was born on 15 May 1955 and matriculated in 1975 at King Bhekuzulu College in Natal province. He worked as a clerk in the offices of the Hlabisa magistrate from 1976 to 1986. In 1987, he took up office as Inkosi of the Mdletshe tribe in Hlabisa, a lifetime appointment. In this capacity he represented Hlabisa in the KwaZulu Legislative Assembly in 1992, and he also served as Deputy Minister of Justice and Correctional Services in the KwaZulu government from 1992 until the government was dissolved upon the end of apartheid in 1994. He earned his BJuris degree from the University of Zululand in 1996.

== Provincial legislature ==
Mdletshe joined the KwaZulu-Natal Legislature in 1996, representing the IFP. From 1998 until 2004, he served as Speaker in the legislature. He continued to serve as an ordinary Member of the Provincial Legislature thereafter and was re-elected to his final term in the legislature in the 2009 general election, ranked seventh on the IFP's provincial party list. During the legislative term that followed, he served as the IFP's provincial shadow minister for cooperative governance. In the next general election in 2014, he was ranked 14th on the IFP's party list and did not gain election to one of the nine seats won by the party in the election.
