= Siphosethu Ngcobo =

South African politician

Siphosethu Ngcobo MP

Member of the National Assembly of South Africa
- Incumbent
- Assumed office 22 May 2019

Secretary-General of the Inkatha Freedom Party
- Incumbent
- Assumed office 25 August 2019
- President: Velenkosini Hlabisa
- Deputy: Albert Mncwango
- Preceded by: Velenkosini Hlabisa

Personal details
- Born: Siphosethu Lindinkosi Ngcobo
- Party: Inkatha Freedom Party
- Occupation: Member of Parliament
- Profession: Politician

Siphosethu Lindinkosi Ngcobo is a South African politician who has been serving as the Secretary-General of the Inkatha Freedom Party since August 2019. He was elected to the National Assembly of South Africa in May 2019. Ngcobo is a former president of the National Teachers Union (NATU).

== Education ==
Ngcobo holds a bachelor of education degree and a bachelor of arts degree.

== Political career ==
Ngcobo is a long-standing member of the Inkatha Freedom Party. He was a branch chairperson, a constituency chairperson and a regional chairperson. In August 2019, he was elected secretary-general of the party, succeeding Velenkosini Hlabisa. Ngcobo was also the mayor of Ulundi.

Until September 2018, Ngcobo served as the president of the National Teachers Union. He was succeeded by Allen Thompson.

== Parliamentary career ==
In the 2019 election, Ngcobo was elected to the National Assembly of South Africa via the IFP's regional list. He was sworn in on 22 May 2019. On 27 June 2019, he was given his committee assignments.

Ngcobo was ranked high enough on the IFP regional-to-national list in KwaZulu-Natal to be returned to the National Assembly for his second term following the 2024 general election.

=== Committee assignments ===
- Portfolio Committee on Basic Education
- Portfolio Committee on Higher Education, Science and Technology
