= Port Shepstone High School =

Location
- Port Shepstone, KwaZulu-Natal; South Africa
- 30.74520°S 30.44932°E

Information
- Type: Public
- Motto: Labora in fide - "Education for Life"
- Established: 13 February 1953; 73 years ago
- Locale: Suburban
- Headmaster: Miss McKillen
- Exam board: KZN
- Grades: 8–12
- Age: 14 to 18
- Enrollment: 1,250 pupils
- Colours: Blue; Maroon; White
- Learner-Educator ratio: 35:1
- Website: www.pshs.co.za

Port Shepstone High School is a public co-educational high school in Port Shepstone in KwaZulu-Natal, South Africa.

== History ==
The school officially opened on 13 February 1953.

== The school today ==
It is run by the KwaZulu-Natal Department of Education and a governing body.

== Notable alumni ==
- Warren Britz, Springbok player
- Khalipha Cele, South African first-class cricketer
- Nandipha Magudumana, celebrity doctor
