= Zibuse Mlaba =

South African politician (1955–2021)

Member of the KwaZulu-Natal Provincial Legislature
- In office 21 May 2014 – 7 May 2019

Deputy Provincial Chairperson of the African National Congress in KwaZulu-Natal
- In office 1994–1996
- Chairperson: Jacob Zuma
- Preceded by: Position established
- Succeeded by: S'bu Ndebele

Personal details
- Born: Zibuse Michael Mlaba; 21 September 1955
- Died: 21 October 2021 (aged 66)
- Citizenship: South Africa
- Party: African National Congress
- Other political affiliations: Congress of Traditional Leaders of South Africa
- Spouse: Bongi Sithole-Moloi (divorced)

Zibuse Michael Mlaba (21 September 1955 – 21 October 2021) was a South African politician and traditional leader who represented the African National Congress (ANC) in the KwaZulu-Natal Provincial Legislature between 2014 and 2019. He acted as the chief regent of the amaXimba from 1988 to 2008 and during apartheid was an outspoken supporter of the ANC.

== Political career ==
Mlaba was born on 21 September 1955. Between 1988 and 2008, he acted as the chief regent of the amaXimba of KwaXimba outside Cato Ridge in Natal province, later incorporated into KwaZulu-Natal. He was a founding member of the Congress of Traditional Leaders of South Africa (Contralesa) and in 1989 was a member of a Contralesa delegation that visited the exiled ANC leadership in Lusaka. He openly declared his support for the ANC, even as the region was consumed by political violence between ANC supporters and supporters of the rival Inkatha.

After the ANC was unbanned in 1990, Mlaba was a prominent local leader of the party in the Natal Midlands region. From 1994 to 1996, he was the Deputy Provincial Chairperson of the ANC's KwaZulu-Natal branch, serving under Provincial Chairperson Jacob Zuma. He also represented the ANC in the KwaZulu-Natal Legislature. He was elected to his last term in his seat in the 2014 general election, ranked 52nd on the ANC's provincial party list. He stood for re-election in the 2019 general election but was ranked 77th on the ANC's party list and did not secure a seat.

== Personal life and death ==
He was formerly married to ANC politician Bongi Sithole; they divorced. At the time of his death, he was married to Sindi and had 13 children.

He died on 21 October 2021 at Wareing’s Shopping Centre in Cato Ridge. He was entering his office when he was shot seven times by two anonymous gunmen in a presumed assassination.
