= Nonzwakazi Swartbooi-Ntombela =

South African politician

Nonzwakazi Swartbooi-Ntombela MPL

Member of the KwaZulu-Natal Provincial Legislature

Personal details
- Citizenship: South Africa
- Party: African National Congress

Gloria Nonzwakazi Swartbooi-Ntombela is a South African politician who currently represents the African National Congress (ANC) in the KwaZulu-Natal Provincial Legislature. She was born in the Eastern Cape and joined the KwaZulu-Natal Provincial Legislature during its second administration from 1999 to 2004. Most recently, she was re-elected to her legislative seat in the 2014 general election, ranked 45th on the ANC's provincial party list, and in the 2019 general election, ranked 34th.
