= Lizzie Shabalala =

South African politician

Lizzie Shabalala MP

Member of Parliament from KwaZulu-Natal
- Incumbent
- Assumed office 22 May 2019

Personal details
- Party: ANC

Lizzie Fikelephi Shabalala is a South African politician who has been a Member of Parliament (MP) for the African National Congress.
