= Mandeni =

Mandini
- Location within KwaZulu-Natal Location within South Africa
- Coordinates: 29.157°S 31.408°E
- Country: South Africa
- Province: KwaZulu-Natal
- District: iLembe
- Municipality: Mandeni

Area
  - Total: 18.02 km^{2} (6.96 sq mi)

Population (2011)
  - Total: 3,904
  - Density: 216.6/km^{2} (561.1/sq mi)

Racial makeup (2011)
  - Black African: 54.8%
  - Coloured: 4.4%
  - Indian/Asian: 14.9%
  - White: 24.6%
  - Other: 1.4%

First languages (2011)
  - Zulu: 47.8%
  - English: 31.9%
  - Afrikaans: 14.8%
  - Other: 5.4%
- Time zone: UTC+02:00 (SAST)
- Postal code (street): 4490
- Area code: 032

Mandeni (also Mandini) is a town in iLembe District Municipality in the KwaZulu-Natal province of South Africa.

The town is roughly 22 km north-east of Stanger and 96 km north of Durban.

The town has four shopping centres, namely: Mandeni shopping centre, where most residents go, Sundumbili plaza, Gcaleka Shopping centre (also known as KwaGcaleka) and Mandeni Mall. It has seven township sections, all falling under Sundumbili township. These sections are Bhidla, Sikhalambazo, Thokoza, Dark City, Red Hill, Island (sometimes referred to as Ireland), Chappies and White City. There is also a suburb which accommodated only White people during the apartheid era known as eKwatasi. The town has many factories and attracts workers from near and afar. Most factories are at an industrial area known as KwaSithebe. The biggest employer is Sappi, the largest paper manufacturer in South Africa.

The Tugela River flows through Mandeni and the mouth of the river is 10 km from the town center.

On 28 and 27 December 2020, a rather high maximum temperature of 43.2 °C (109.8 °F) was registered.

== Notable people ==
- Vusi Ximba, musician
- Siphelele Magubane, footballer
- Zawadi Yamungu, musician
- Noma Khosini, musician
- Neliswa Dlamini, musician
- Ntando Zondi, mma fighter
- DJ Sabby, radio dj
- Mroza Buthelezi, radio dj
- Mzokoloko, radio dj
