= Mtholephi Mthimkhulu =

South African politician

Member of the KwaZulu-Natal Provincial Legislature
- In office 1999 – 16 January 2015

Member of the KwaZulu-Natal Executive Council for Agriculture and Rural Development
- In office November 2006 – May 2009
- Premier: S'bu Ndebele
- Preceded by: Gabriel Ndabandaba
- Succeeded by: Lydia Johnson

Personal details
- Born: 26 June 1958
- Died: 16 January 2015 (aged 56)
- Party: African National Congress

Mtholephi Emmanuel Mthimkhulu (26 June 1958 – 16 January 2015) was a South African politician who represented the African National Congress (ANC) in the KwaZulu-Natal Legislature from 1999 until his death in 2015. Formerly a teacher and journalist, he served as KwaZulu-Natal's Member of the Executive Council (MEC) for Agriculture and Environmental Affairs from 2006 to 2009 and before that as Chief Whip in the legislature from 2004 to 2006.

== Early life and career ==
Mthimkhulu was born on 26 June 1958. He worked as a teacher at Mqhawe High School in Durban from 1984 to 1986 and then worked as a journalist at the SABC from 1984 to 1995.

== Political career ==
In 1999, Mthimkhulu took up an ANC seat in the KwaZulu-Natal Legislature. In 2004, he was appointed Chief Whip of the Majority Party in the legislature. In November 2006, he was appointed to the KwaZulu-Natal Executive Council in a reshuffle by Premier S'bu Ndebele, who appointed him to succeed Gabriel Ndabandaba as MEC for Agriculture and Environmental Affairs.

Ahead of the 2009 general election, the Mail & Guardian said that he was one of several ANC politicians who were "believed to be on their way out" because they were perceived as political supporters of Thabo Mbeki, who was succeeded as President by Jacob Zuma. Mthimkhulu was nonetheless re-elected to his legislative seat, ranked 19th on the ANC's provincial party list, although he left the Executive Council to become Deputy Speaker in the legislature; he was succeeded as MEC by Lydia Johnson.

After the 2014 general election, he was succeeded as Deputy Speaker by Meshack Radebe, but he was re-elected to his legislative seat as an ordinary Member of the Provincial Legislature, ranked eighth on the ANC's provincial party list.

== Personal life ==
He was married to Halalisile. At the time of his death, they had five children and five grandchildren. He died on 16 January 2015 after a lengthy illness.
