= Mike Mabuyakhulu =

South African politician and trade unionist (born 1964)

Deputy Provincial Chairperson of the African National Congress in KwaZulu-Natal
- In office July 2018 – July 2022 (stepped aside in May 2021)
- Chairperson: Sihle Zikalala
- Preceded by: Willies Mchunu
- Succeeded by: Nomagugu Simelane-Zulu

Member of the KwaZulu-Natal Executive Council for Economic Development and Tourism
- In office May 2009 – 6 June 2016 (with Environmental Affairs from May 2014)
- Premier: Zweli Mkhize; Senzo Mchunu; Willies Mchunu
- Preceded by: Position established
- Succeeded by: Sihle Zikalala

Member of the KwaZulu-Natal Provincial Legislature
- In office 1994 – 6 June 2016

Provincial Treasurer of the African National Congress in KwaZulu-Natal
- In office 1998–2008
- Chairperson: S'bu Ndebele
- Preceded by: Zweli Mkhize
- Succeeded by: Peggy Nkonyeni

Personal details
- Born: Michael Mabuyakhulu; 31 March 1964 (age 62) Ingwavuma, KwaZulu-Natal, South Africa
- Citizenship: South Africa
- Party: African National Congress
- Relations: Vincent Mabuyakhulu (brother) John Mabuyakhulu (brother) Dan Mabuyakhulu (brother)

Michael Mabuyakhulu (born 31 March 1964) is a South African politician and former trade unionist who represented the African National Congress (ANC) in the KwaZulu-Natal Provincial Legislature between 1994 and 2016. He also served for seventeen years in the KwaZulu-Natal Executive Council, most prominently as Member of the Executive Council (MEC) for Economic Development and Tourism from 2009 to 2016.

Mabuyakhulu was the Provincial Treasurer of the ANC's KwaZulu-Natal branch from 1998 to 2008 and later served as the party's Deputy Provincial Chairperson from 2018 to 2021; he stepped aside from the latter position in May 2021 after he was charged with corruption.

== Early life and career ==
Mabuyakhulu is from rural Ingwavuma on the North Coast of present-day KwaZulu-Natal, formerly part of Natal province. His Zulu clan name is Ndiyema. He was formerly a trade unionist, first in the engineering sector of the Metal and Allied Workers' Union and then as a regional leader of its successor organisation, the National Union of Metalworkers of South Africa. His brothers – former Amajuba Mayor Dan Mabuyakhulu, former Member of Parliament Vincent Mabuyakhulu, and former Empangeni councillor John Mabuyakhulu – were also active in the trade union movement and ANC.

== Political career ==
Mabuyakhulu joined the KwaZulu-Natal Provincial Legislature in 1994, the year that apartheid ended. He led the ANC's caucus in the legislature's committee on economic development and tourism until 1999, when he was appointed to the KwaZulu-Natal Executive Council for the first time. Over the next decade he served as MEC in the economic development and tourism, public works, finance, and local government portfolios.

=== ANC Provincial Treasurer: 1998–2008 ===
In 1998, he was elected Provincial Treasurer of the ANC's KwaZulu-Natal branch, serving under Provincial Chairperson S'bu Ndebele. Both Mabuyakhulu and Ndebele were re-elected in September 2002, with Mabuyakhulu comfortably defeating a challenge from businessman Don Mkhwanazi; he earned 320 votes against Mkhwanazi's 152. He was re-elected to a third term as ANC Provincial Treasurer in May 2005, again alongside Ndebele, but was succeeded by Peggy Nkonyeni in June 2008.

=== MEC for Economic Development: 2009–2016 ===
Pursuant to Mabuyakhulu's re-election to the legislature in the 2009 general election, newly elected Premier Zweli Mkhize appointed him as MEC for Economic Development and Tourism. He was re-elected to the legislature in the 2014 general election, ranked fifth on the ANC's provincial party list, and remained in office as MEC until 2016, with environmental affairs added to his portfolio from May 2014 onwards.

==== Intaka donation scandal ====
In 2011, Mabuyakhulu faced criminal charges in connection with his role in securing a R1-million donation paid to the ANC in 2008. The donation came from Uruguayan businessman Gaston Savoi and Savoi's company, Intaka Holdings, which had received a large state contract – to supply the provincial government with water purification and oxygen equipment – shortly before the donation was made. The National Prosecuting Authority therefore alleged that the donation had constituted a bribe. Mabuyakhulu's supporters claimed that the prosecution was politically motivated, given that he was viewed as possible candidate to stand against Zweli Mkhize for the ANC provincial chairmanship in 2012. The charges against him were dropped in August 2012, and, when the matter was reopened at the Zondo Commission in 2021, he continued to deny any wrongdoing.

==== Succession ====
On 6 June 2016, Mabuyakhulu was fired as MEC in a reshuffle by Willies Mchunu, who had recently replaced Senzo Mchunu as Premier. Later the same day, Mabuyakhulu announced that he would also resign from the provincial legislature with immediate effect. Peggy Nkonyeni was also sacked and resigned alongside Mabuyakhulu; their legislative seats were filled by Sifiso Sonjica and Nomakiki Majola later in June.

=== ANC Deputy Chairperson: 2018–2022 ===
In January 2018, Mabuyakhulu was appointed as the interim leader of the KwaZulu-Natal ANC after the incumbent provincial leadership corps – then led by Sihle Zikalala – was disbanded by the party's National Executive Committee. He held that position until July, when fresh leadership elections were held and Mabuyakhulu was elected Deputy Provincial Chairperson of the KwaZulu-Natal ANC. He defeated the longstanding incumbent, Willies Mchunu, in a vote, and served under Sihle Zikalala, who was re-elected to the party chair at the same conference.

==== Corruption charges ====
Mabuyakhulu's tenure as Deputy Provincial Chairperson was marked with controversy over pending corruption charges against him. The charges pertained to the 2012 North Sea Jazz Festival, which had never taken place but which the provincial government had allegedly paid for nonetheless. The National Prosecuting Authority alleged that Mabuyakhulu, then Economic Development MEC, had authorised the payments for the festival and had personally received a R300,000 kickback. The case had been under investigation since 2012 or 2013 and Mabuyakhulu had first appeared in court in February 2018, before he was elected ANC Deputy Provincial Chairperson. He and 15 others (eight persons and seven companies) were charged with corruption, theft, and money laundering in relation to an amount of R28 million; he denied the charges and was released on R50,000 bail.

==== Succession ====
Ahead of the 2019 general election, the provincial party ranked Mabuyakhulu third on its list of nominees for deployment to leadership positions, and the ANC said that he was in line for a position in the Executive Council. However, due to the ongoing legal proceedings, Mabuyakhulu withdrew his name from consideration. In August 2020, according to News24, he told the party's provincial leadership that he intended to resign as ANC Deputy Provincial Chairperson, but his resignation was rejected and he was instead referred to the provincial party's internal Integrity Commission. The Integrity Commission cleared him to remain in his party office in October 2020. However, in May 2021, Mabuyakhulu formally stepped aside from the deputy chairmanship. At the party's next provincial elective conference in July 2022, Nomagugu Simelane-Zulu was elected to succeed him. At that time his corruption trial was ongoing in the Durban High Court.
