= Lionel Mtshali =

South African politician

Premier of KwaZulu-Natal
- In office 10 February 1999 – 23 April 2004
- Monarch: Goodwill Zwelithini
- Preceded by: Ben Ngubane
- Succeeded by: S'bu Ndebele

Minister of Arts, Culture, Science and Technology
- In office September 1996 – February 1999
- Preceded by: Ben Ngubane
- Succeeded by: Ben Ngubane

Member of the National Assembly
- In office 1994–1999

Personal details
- Born: Lionel Percival Hercules Mbeki Mtshali; 7 November 1935 Vryheid, Zululand; South Africa
- Died: 13 December 2015 (aged 80) Durban, KwaZulu-Natal
- Party: Inkatha Freedom Party
- Spouse: Daphne
- Children: 4
- Education: University of the Free State

Lionel Percival Hercules Mbeki Mtshali (7 November 1935 – 13 December 2015) was a South African politician who was Premier of KwaZulu-Natal from 1999 to 2004. He was known for unilaterally ordering the expansion of the province's antiretrovirals programme during the HIV/AIDS epidemic, in defiance of the policy of the national government under President Thabo Mbeki. A founding member and former chairperson of the Inkatha Freedom Party, Mtshali was also national Minister of Arts, Culture, Science and Technology in the government of President Nelson Mandela from 1996 to 1999.

== Early life and career ==
Lionel Percival Hercules Mtshali was born on 7 November 1935 in Vryheid, Zululand and grew up in the region that became the KwaZulu-Natal province. During apartheid, his family was forcibly removed from the farm where they had lived. Mtshali earned a Master's degree in education from the University of the Free State and worked as a history teacher and school principal.

In 1975, Mtshali was among the founding members of Inkatha, later known as the Inkatha Freedom Party (IFP). He became a school inspector and was appointed Chief Inspector in the KwaZulu homeland's Department of Education in 1984; he was later appointed Minister of Education and Culture in the KwaZulu government. Inkatha and KwaZulu leader Mangosuthu Buthelezi appointed him to both positions.

== National government ==
In South Africa's first democratic elections in 1994, Mtshali was elected to the National Assembly as a member of the IFP. From 1994, he was part of a six-member committee established jointly by the IFP and the ruling African National Congress (ANC) to attempt to normalise relations between the parties and curb the political violence that was ongoing between their respective constituencies in KwaZulu-Natal; his counterparts on the ANC side of the committee were Jacob Zuma, Kgalema Motlanthe, and Mendi Msimang.

In 1996, he succeeded Ben Ngubane as Minister of Arts, Culture, Science and Technology in the Government of National Unity under President Nelson Mandela. In late 1998, the respected director-general of the Department of Arts, Culture, Science and Technology, Roger Jardine, resigned from the portfolio, reportedly due to difficulties in his relationship with Mtshali. In particular, the department had been criticised for spending R2.5 million on a monument to the Battle of Blood River, as well as R800,000 on a feast to mark the monument's unveiling. Jardine was reportedly concerned about the use of state funds for this purpose, especially because the feast was perceived by critics as an instrument of partisan IFP campaigning ahead of the 1999 general election.

Mtshali was also national chairman of the IFP between 1997 and 2004.

== Provincial government ==
=== Tensions in the coalition ===
Mtshali was sworn in as Premier of KwaZulu-Natal on 10 February 1999, again succeeding Ben Ngubane. Mtshali was reportedly hand-picked for the position by Mangosuthu Buthelezi, with whom he was close. Under Mtshali, pursuant to the 1999 general election, the province was governed in a coalition between the IFP and the ANC. However, the coalition was negotiated between the two parties at the national level, and Mtshali was among a group within the IFP which reportedly opposed the agreement and lobbied the national IFP leadership to end the coalition.

According to the Sunday Times, Mtshali's personal demeanour was "gruff, taciturn and unapproachable" and his leadership style "autocratic and imperial". Describing him in similar terms, the ANC caucus boycotted his first address to the KwaZulu-Natal provincial legislature in 1999. In 2002, Mtshali unilaterally fired two ANC Members of the Executive Council, earning the ire of his coalition partner. He also decided unilaterally that all business of the KwaZulu-Natal government would be conducted in Ulundi, an IFP stronghold; the decision met strong resistance from the ANC and the Democratic Alliance (DA). There were also media reports about the extreme expense to taxpayers of Mtshali's commute from Durban to Ulundi.

=== HIV/AIDS policy ===
Mtshali is remembered primarily for his decision while Premier to defy the national government of President Thabo Mbeki in deviating from the national government's policy on antiretrovirals during the HIV/AIDS epidemic. In 2001, when the Treatment Action Campaign sued the government in an attempt to force it to expand its mother-to-child transmission prevention programme, Mtshali backed the lawsuit. This put him on the opposite side to Mbeki and to his own provincial health minister, Zweli Mkhize of Mbeki's ANC, both of whom opposed the lawsuit.

According to Mtshali, in October 2001 he approached Mkhize and asked him to expand the province's nevirapine programme, but Mkhize said that doing so would be at odds with the national government's current policy. Then, in January 2002, Mtshali announced in a press release that he would defy the national government and distribute nevirapine to every pregnant HIV-positive woman in the province, in order to curb mother-to-child transmission. Saying that he could not have any more sick children "on my conscience", he wrote:

We shall not wait one day longer, nor allow any space for further excuses, delaying tactics or preposterous theory which may get in the way of saving our children. I have turned upside down the scientific facts to find a reason which can justify the failure to act and ameliorate the suffering and reduce the death of so many of our children and I have found none.

The decision was covered in national and international media and was widely applauded; the New York Times called Mtshali an "unlikely renegade".

=== Leader of the opposition ===
He remained in office as Premier until 23 April 2004, when the ANC took control of the province in the 2004 general election. Thereafter he became leader of the official opposition (the IFP) in the KwaZulu-Natal provincial legislature. Under his leadership, the IFP, with the DA, boycotted a sitting of the legislature in October 2007 following a physical altercation with the ANC in an earlier plenary session.

== Death ==
Mtshali died on 13 December 2015 at the age of 80. He died at Westville Hospital in Durban after a short illness related to a heart condition. President Jacob Zuma declared that Mtshali's funeral on 19 December would be a special Provincial Official Funeral; the national flag was flown at half-mast across KwaZulu-Natal.

== Personal life ==
Mtshali was survived by his wife, Daphne, and four children. In 2002, he said he was invested in the government's HIV/AIDS policy partly because two daughters of his daughter-in-law had died of the disease since 1998.
