= S'bu Ndebele =

South African politician (born 1948)

Sibusiso Joel "S'bu" Ndebele

Minister of Correctional Services
- In office 12 June 2012 – 26 May 2014
- President: Jacob Zuma
- Preceded by: Nosiviwe Mapisa-Nqakula
- Succeeded by: Michael Masutha

Minister of Transport
- In office 11 May 2009 – 12 June 2012
- President: Jacob Zuma
- Preceded by: Jeff Radebe
- Succeeded by: Ben Martins

4th Premier of KwaZulu-Natal
- In office 23 April 2004 – 6 May 2009
- Monarch: Goodwill Zwelithini
- Preceded by: Lionel Mtshali
- Succeeded by: Zweli Mkhize

High Commissioner of South Africa to Australia
- In office 13 May 2015 – February 2017
- President: Jacob Zuma
- Preceded by: Koleka Anita Mqulwana
- Succeeded by: Beryl Sisulu

High Commissioner of South Africa to India
- In office 2019–2026
- President: Cyril Ramaphosa
- Succeeded by: Anil Sooklal

Personal details
- Born: Sibusiso Joel Ndebele; 17 October 1948 (age 77) Rorke's Drift, Natal, South Africa
- Education: University of South Africa

Sibusiso Joel "S'bu" Ndebele (born 17 October 1948) is the former Minister of Correctional Services serving from 2012 to 2014. He has been on the National Executive Committee (NEC) of the African National Congress (ANC) since 1997, and was the Provincial Chair of the ANC from 1998 to 2008.

From 1994 to 2004 he was the MEC for Transport in the government of KwaZulu-Natal province. From 2004 to 2009 he was the Premier of the South African province of KwaZulu-Natal. From 2009 to 2012 he was the national Minister of Transport. Current ambassador of South Africa to India, since 2019 and former High Commissioner of South Africa to Australia till 2016.

== Studies ==
He attended primary school at Makhaseneni, near Melmoth, and matriculated from Eshowe Teachers’ Training and High School in Eshowe.

He obtained a degree in library science from the University of Zululand in 1972, a Bachelor of Arts degree in international politics and African politics from the University of South Africa in 1983, and an honours degree in development administration and politics in 1985.

== Early politics ==
He was publicity secretary of the South African Students' Organisation at the University of Zululand (1972). Shortly thereafter, in 1974, he joined the African National Congress underground and went into exile in Swaziland. He was arrested for ANC activities in May 1976 and was sentenced to ten years on Robben Island in June 1977.

== Criticism ==
Dec 2015 - Durban - Former transport minister S'bu Ndebele has appeared in a Durban court on charges of fraud, corruption and money laundering. Ndebele had been named as the first accused in a corruption, fraud and money-laundering case.

He is accused of accepting just over R10m for his direct benefit. Ndebele allegedly accepted the money in order to facilitate tenders worth more than R2bn.

He was heavily criticised for offering 16 500 hectares of land to the Dubai-based company Ruwaad Holdings to build a massive theme park named 'Zulu World'. If the project had gone ahead it would have resulted in the forced eviction of around 10 000 families from the eMacambini clan. The affected community vowed to resist the evictions and accused Ndebele of "selling" them to "a new kind of colonialism." On 4 December 2008, the eMacambini community blockaded the N2 and R102 freeways to protest S'bu Ndebele's non-reply to their memorandum handed over in a previous march. As a result of large scale road blockades the project was abandoned and the eMacambini people remained on their land.

On 16 May 2009, shortly after accepting the position of Minister of Transport, Ndebele received a R1,1-million Mercedes Benz S500 from the Vukuzakhe group of 'emerging contractors', who had received contracts worth more than R400-million in the department. Opposition parties have claimed that the gift could be a conflict of interest and that the Mercedes should be returned. Ndebele explained that he received the gift unannounced, long after he had ceased being MEC for transport, and denies any conflict of interest.

== Toll Roads ==
"There is not enough money available to fix roads, so more toll gates will probably have to be built on national roads", Transport Minister Sbu Ndebele said in a report. More than 4 100 km of roads - or 32 percent of the national road network - are in such a bad state that they only have a "structural life span" of five years left, as of the report.

It would cost more than R35-billion to fix these roads before 2014, Ndebele said in Parliament, according to Beeld newspaper. But his department has only R16,8-billion available to do this.

== Departmental Corruption Allegations ==
The North West government said on Wednesday it had been hit by a multimillion-rand scandal related to road projects that might have been improperly and fraudulently awarded.

"I can confirm that a number of contracts issued by the department for several road projects in the province may have been improperly and fraudulently awarded," said Transport MEC Mahlakeng Mahlakeng in a statement.

He said it was estimated that more than R1.5 billion allocated for road capital projects over the next three years - the medium term expenditure framework - had already been committed.

Within three months of the current financial year, 2009/10, the roads directorate had already spent its entire capital project budget, he said. Its budget allocation for the year was R525 million.

He said the information had emerged from an audit by PriceWaterhouseCoopers. The government was committed to getting the money back.

Further details would be released once the government had cleared the legal implications of doing so.

Millions of rands' worth of contracts had been issued by the department "without following procedure as stipulated by the Public Finance Management Act (PMFA)".

The government would give the audit report to the police's Hawks and the Asset Forfeiture Unit to investigate. - credit Sapa

== See also ==
- Siphiwe Mvuyane
- Tryphina Mboxela Jokweni

Political offices
Preceded by Lionel Mtshali	Premier of KwaZulu-Natal; 23 April 2004 – 6 May 2009	Succeeded by Zweli Mkhize
Preceded by Jeff Radebe	Minister of Transport; 2009 – 2012	Succeeded by Ben Martins
Preceded by Nosiviwe Mapisa-Nqakula	Minister of Correctional Services; 2012 – present	Incumbent
