= Cat VIP Protection Services =

South African private security company

- Type: Private company
- Industry: Private security
- Founder: Vusimuzi "Cat" Matlala
- Headquarters: Pretoria, South Africa
- Area served: South Africa
- Key people: Cat Matlala (Director)

Cat VIP Protection Services (also known as CAT VIP Security or Cat Protection and Security) is a South African private security company established by controversial tender tycoon Cat Matlala as a private security and VIP protection firm. The company has been linked to private security arrangements involving public figures and government events and is a subject of inquiry at the Madlanga Commission for its alleged entering into agreement with the Ekurhuleni Metropolitan Police Department (EMPD) to be equipped with vehicle blue lights, a system only allowed to police.

Testimony before Judge Mbuyiseli Madlanga revealed that an "unlawful" memorandum of understanding was signed in June and October 2021 between Cat VIP Protection and senior members of the EMPD, and allowed the company to assist with VIP protection and security operations, including responding to crime scenes, providing backup support and escorting the mayor - effectively "outsourcing law enforcement” in Ekurhuleni, as former EMPD deputy chief Revo Spies put it during his testimony in November 2025.

== Background ==
Cat VIP Protection gained national attention during proceedings of the Madlanga Commission where it was revealed in 2025 that the company had developed a controversial working relationship with the Ekurhuleni Metropolitan Police Department (EMPD).

It was revealed that Julius Mkhwanazi, suspended EMPD boss, enabled the Cat VIP Protection deal through his close relationship with the owner of the company and tender tycoon Cat Matlala.

The Cat VIP cars that were fitted with blue lights included two BMWs, a Mercedes-Benz and a VW.

When News24 broke the story of the blue lights, suspended city human resource manager Linda Gxasheka moved and suspended Mkhwanazi in February 2023. But soon afterwards the suspension was lifted after city manager Imogen Mashazi ordered it. Gxasheka said the city was unable to discipline Mkhwanazi because a law firm report making the recommendations was not given to the municipality by the law firm due to nonpayment.

In September 2023, the Independent Police Investigative Directorate (Ipid) recommended that disciplinary actions be taken against Mkhwanazi for the blue-lights issue.

Former EMPD deputy chief Revo Spies testified in November 2025 at the Madlanga Commission that memorandums signed in 2021 authorised Cat VIP vehicles to attend crime scenes as though they were official EMPD units.

Mkhwanazi, who also signed a second memorandum with Medicare 24, another of Matlala's companies, to supply medical service EMPD officers, denied any wrongdoing in the deals as Matlala was intending to donate the cars to the police department to meet vehicle demands and the security cooperation with Cat VIP happened at no cost.

It was at no cost to the city and he didn't charge anything. I think, for him, it was part of his marketing to the city

— Julius Mkhwanazi, 3 December 2025

Mashazi testified in December 2025 that Mkhwanazi did not have authority to enter into the agreement and described the arrangement as “irregular”, while denying interference.

Mkhwanazi is one of key persons of interest in the Madlanga investigation along with Shadrack Sibiya, Senzo Mchunu and Brown Mogotsi.

The inquiry looks at whether the Cat VIP agreement complied with Ekurhuleni municipal and policing regulations, particularly the concerns regarding:

- The fitting of blue lights to private vehicles
- The scope of authority granted to Cat VIP personnel
- Whether proper procurement and oversight procedures were followed

It October 2025, eight employees at the Private Security Industry Regulatory Authority (Psira) were suspended after the body found irregularities in the registration of the Cat VIP security company.
