= Jothan Msibi =

South African taxi-industry leader and businessman (died 7 January 2024)

Jotham Zanemvula “King Mswazi” Msibi, born 3 June 1961, sometimes written as "Jotham Msibi" (died on 7 January 2024) was a South African taxi-industry leader and businessman who played a high-profile role in taxi associations and industry bodies. He is implicated at the Madlanga Commission as the “president” of a criminal network dubbed “The Firm”, under whose umbrella the “Big Five cartel” operates.

== Role in taxi industry ==
In the early 1990s, he founded Santaco and the implementation of routes, licences, and associations. The South African National Taxi Council (SANTACO) described him in a tribute as “one of the council’s founders and a visionary leader who made substantial contributions to the taxi sector by promoting the industry’s acceptance, prosperity, harmony and peace.”

In February 2000, Msibi's ex-wife Sara Msibi and her sister Happy Mgoato were arrested after being implicated in the plot to murder him.

Mswazi also known as Ndlondlo was the President of SALLDTBO (South African Local Long Distance Taxi Bus Organization) for 27 years. In 2025 he was succeeded by Joe 'Ferrari' Sibanyoni. Vusimuzi Matlala tried to assassinate Joe Sibanyoni on behalf of Msibi. Sibanyoni and Mswazi used to be taxi associates until their relationship broke down. The peace treaty was brokered by SANTACO President Abner Motlhabane Tsebe after many taxi drivers were killed from both sides. Mswazi died as the Chairman of Taxi Choice, a holding company for Zola Taxi Sales which was founded in 2010 by Mswazi. Taxi Choice through SANTACO it's a shareholder of SA Taxi, a subsidiary of Transaction capital. Mr Joe 'Ferrari' Sibanyoni is the current Chairman of Taxi Choice.

== Madlanga Commission ==
In October 2025 a witness (“Witness B”) testified that Msibi was identified as the “president” of a criminal network dubbed “The Firm”, under whose umbrella the “Big Five” cartel operates. Msibi has been described as “dangerous” and “ruthless” in relation to killings. The testimony stated that Mswazi appeared to be president, and the rest are of the executives which formed the Big Five. The cartel is alleged to have engaged in extortion, murder, tender fraud, protection rackets and infiltration of the justice system.

Investigators who testified at the commission linked Msibi to the murder of engineer Armand Swart. A witness (“Witness A”) before the commission said that envelopes of bribes were being offered in the case: “There were three envelopes floating around … one will be for the investigating officers, one will be for the magistrate and the last one will be for the prosecutor.”

Testimony indicated that Msibi's farm near Hammanskraal was used for meetings by cartel associates. One witness said the farm was “most secure” and only accessible to those close to Msibi.

Msibi was never criminally convicted. The claims remain allegations based on sworn testimony and investigative reporting. Former SANTACO member Phillip Taaibosch said that Msibi was not a "tsotsi". The co-founder of SANTACO, Mandla Gcaba said that Msibi worked hard over the years to bring stability and peace in the taxi industry and worked to turn it into a viable business through the formation of the association. Gcaba continued to add that position of chairperson of the women's desk in the taxi association would not exist without the pressure Msibi applied to make it happen.

== Personal life ==
Msibi was the brother of Mandla Msibi, the ANC treasurer in Mpumalanga. Msibi was married to Perciah Msibi.

== Death ==
Msibi died on 7 January 2024 in a Tshwane hospital after a short illness. On 11 January 2024, Gauteng Department of Roads and Transport MEC Kedibone Daile Tlabela visited his family to offer her condolences. A memorial service was held 12 January 2024 on his property in the Dinokeng Game Reserve, more than 700 attendees representing about 50 taxi associations from all nine provinces were reported. His funeral was conducted on 14 January at the Wild Life Estates Cemetery in Brits, North West. His funeral was also attended by the Former Minister of Police of South Africa Bheki Cele, Advocate Anneline van den Heever and EFF leader Julius Malema.

His widow Perciah Msibi described his passing as “a massive loss” and emphasised his love for his family and his commitment to industry and community.

== Madlanga commission ==
On 18 August 2026, it was heard at the Madlanga commission how Msibi, Steve Motsumi, Katiso Molefe and Sergeant Fannie Nkosi wanted to buy and sell law enforcement surveillance technology to King Mswati of the eSwatini Kingdom. WhatsApp messages revealed that these men were acting as South African representatives, especially the South African Police Services, while trying to buy these devices from a company in Czech Republic. It was Fannie Nkosi who fraudulently used the South African Police stamps on all the documents. On 27 October 2026 the commission issued a summons to the former adviser of Cyril Ramphosa, Benjani Chauke after WhatsApp messages appeared between him and Msibi relating to the state security, confidential presidential briefings, senior crime intelligence officials, and substantial financial gains.
