= Mary de Haas =

South African anthropologist and human rights activist

Mary de Haas (born 1943) is a South African anthropologist, political violence monitor, and human rights documenter and defender known for her decades-long work documenting political violence in KwaZulu-Natal. De Haas made national headlines in South Africa in November 2025 when she testified before a parliamentary ad hoc committee about why she had backed the then-suspended Police Minister Senzo Mchunu's controversial order to disband a team investigating political cases.

== Early life and education ==
De Haas trained as an anthropologist and completed postgraduate studies in social anthropology. Her academic focus contributed to her later work on political conflict and social dynamics in KwaZulu-Natal. De Haas lectured in anthropology at the University of KwaZulu-Natal (formerly the University of Natal). Her work often intersected with themes of violence, social structures, conflict mediation, and cultural practices.

She later became associated with the university as an honorary research fellow.

In 2021 Rhodes University awarded her an honorary doctorate

== Violence monitoring and activism ==
Beginning in the 1980s and intensifying during the political conflicts of the late apartheid and transition periods, De Haas became widely known for documenting political violence in KwaZulu-Natal. Her research and field monitoring contributed to several inquiries and commissions investigating killings, paramilitary activity, and political intimidation.

De Haas has worked closely with communities, NGOs, and legal bodies, often submitting detailed reports, affidavits, and public statements on police conduct. She has been recognised for highlighting abuses within South African Police Service (SAPS).

== Parliament Ad Hoc Committee ==
De Haas told Members of Parliament in an Ad Hoc Committee on the allegations made by Lt Gen Nhlanhla Mkhwananzi that she had received troubling information from police officers and other confidential sources about the Political Killings Task Team's (PKTT) conduct, including alleged abuse of suspects and fabricated statements. Her testimony came after explosive allegations levelled against her by KwaZulu-Natal Commissioner Lieutenant General Nhlanhla Mkhwanazi, who accused her of being privy to sensitive internal police information.

== Controversies ==
De Haas's behaviour during her testimony to the Ad Hoc Committee angered some of members of parliament who described it as 'hearsay and gossip'. She also falsely claimed to have a doctorate. The University of KwaZulu-Natal then issued a statement confirming that she does not have a doctorate, and is not a professor at the institution.

She has a record of supporting AIDS denialist conspiracy theories.

== See also ==
- Big Five cartel
