= Kenny Kunene =

South African businessman and ex-convict

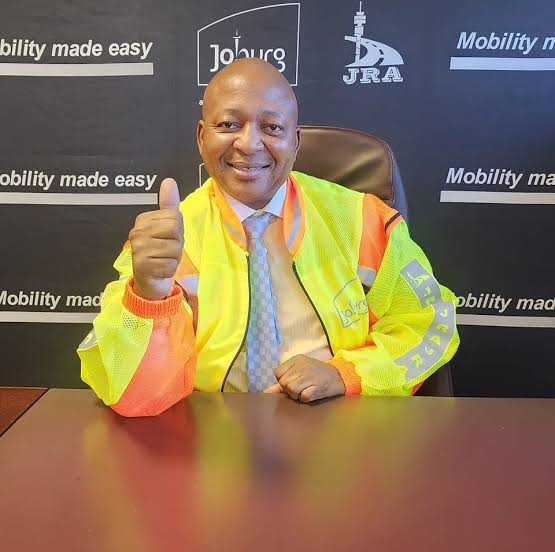
- Born: Kenneth Kunene; October 21, 1970 (age 55); Odendaalsrus, South Africa
- Occupations: Businessman; motivational speaker; politician
- Spouses: Mathato Kunene (div. 2012); Nonkululeko Whitney Mhlanga (m. 2017)
- Children: 6

Kenny Kunene (born 21 October 1970) is a South African businessman, politician, motivational speaker, teacher, activist and convicted criminal. Kunene currently serves as Deputy President of the Patriotic Alliance. He served as Secretary-General of the Patriotic Alliance from 2013 to 2014. While working as a high school English teacher, Kunene opened a shebeen selling alcohol after work and began engaging in criminal activities including robberies and fraud. In 1997, he was convicted of running a Ponzi scheme for which he served six years in prison.

After his prison stint, Kunene became a motivational speaker and became active in local politics. He later opened a club called ZAR and became known for throwing lavish parties. In 2011, he drew controversy for hosting “sushi parties” where guest ate sushi off the bodies of half naked women. In February 2019, Kunene released Yookoo Rides, a mobile app for vehicle for hire services.

== Early life ==
Kenny Kunene was raised by his mother and grandparents. Kunene's mother has served as an Evangelist and faith healer. While he was growing up near Odendaalsrus his grandmother, a midwife, was the family's sole breadwinner. Kunene got involved in student politics in the 1980s and at the age of 15 he was imprisoned for 6 months due to his role in student uprising and protests in the Free State.

== Career ==
Kunene attended Marobe Primary School, Rearabetswe Secondary school and Vista University. He later became an English and history teacher. Kunene was imprisoned from 1997 to 2003 after being convicted of running a Ponzi scheme. While in prison, he organised parties to build goodwill among his fellow inmates and was influential in prison. After he was released, he went to work at Calculus Private School in Bloemfontein and later began working with convicted bank robber Gayton McKenzie, who had since become a motivational speaker. Kunene and McKenzie then invested in a seafood distribution business.

Kunene has also worked as a public relations consultant and lobbyist for mining companies. In March 2012 the Hawks (special police investigative unit) spokesman McIntosh Polela confirmed that the Hawks had made an investigation into Kunene regarding fraudulent representations to communities and potential shareholders as part of the application for mining rights by Central Rand Gold (CRG). No charges were levelled.

Kunene was a supporter of the African National Congress until 2013 when he wrote a scathing open letter to President Jacob Zuma criticising his leadership. In July 2013, Kunene briefly joined the Economic Freedom Fighters as a high-profile member of the organisation's "Central Command Team" before resigning from the organisation in August 2013.

In November 2013, Kunene became the Secretary-General of a newly formed political party, the Patriotic Alliance. Kunene is currently focusing on his businesses, including a smart city technology company which operates YooKoo Ride, an e-hailing taxi app in South Africa, public relations, government relations, skills training and development and mining consulting and Investment. Kunene is currently serving as Transport MMC in the City of Johannesburg.

== Political career ==
=== 1986 ===
- At about age 15, Kunene was imprisoned for six months for participating in student protests under apartheid in the Free State—his first foray into political activism.

=== 2013 ===
- Early in the year, he publicly broke with the ANC by publishing an open letter sharply criticizing then-President Jacob Zuma.
- July: Joined the newly formed Economic Freedom Fighters (EFF) as part of its Central Command Team.
- August: Resigned from the EFF after only a few weeks amid leadership shifts.
- November: Co-founded the Patriotic Alliance (PA) with Gayton McKenzie and became its first Secretary‑General.

=== 2014 ===
- Stepped down as Secretary‑General to focus on personal business interests (though remained active in the party).

=== 2022 ===
- April: Publicly supported the PA’s pragmatic governance style alongside McKenzie, particularly highlighting his willingness to forgo a mayoral salary for service delivery in the Central Karoo.

=== 2023 ===
- February: Also became a city councillor in Johannesburg following a reshuffle. He was later elected to the Mayoral Committee by Mayor Thapelo Amad
- Appointed by Executive Mayor of Johannesburg Kabelo Gwamanda as MMC for Transport.

=== 2025 ===
- In July 2025, Kunene was put on special leave for 30 days after he was found at the house of one of the suspects who was arrested in connection with the murder of DJ Sumbody. Kunene resigned a few days later from his position as a Councillor of the Patriotic Alliance, and as a Member of the Mayoral Committee (MMC) for Transport in the City of Johannesburg. Kunene was re-sworn in as a councillor of the city of Johannesburg on 26 September 2025 after being cleared by a law firm of any wrongdoings after being found at the house of Katiso Molefe.

== Personal life ==
Kunene has five children, Mpho, Thato, Mosa, Remo and Reemona and he currently lives with three of his children and his wife, Nonkululeko “MaRemo” Whitney Mhlanga, in Sandton, Johannesburg. Kunene is the third child of four children; his late sister Disebo is the first-born, then Papiki and the last born Neo.

Kunene is known for his appreciation of sushi, and has been referred to in South Africa as "The Sushi King" or "Mr. Sushi". His birthday party on 21 October 2010 that hosted the then ANCYL president Julius Malema and featured nyotaimori was criticised by then COSATU secretary general Zwelinzima Vavi, leading to a political row. Also, the ANCWL condemned nyotaimori at Kunene's party as an attack on the bodily integrity and dignity of women in South Africa.

== In media ==
Kunene was the star of South African reality television show So What: Big Money, Big Dreams which aired on e.tv during 2011. In 2013, he appeared in the fourth episode of the British travel documentary television series The Moaning of Life. In April 2014, Kunene was the roastee at Comedy Central Africa's Roast of Kenny Kunene. Kunene also owns two online news publications, namely WeeklyXpose and AfricaNews 24-7.
