= Marius van der Merwe =

Assassinated witness of the Madlanga Commission

- Born: c. 20 December 1983
- Died: 5 December 2025 (aged 40–41); Brakpan, Gauteng, South Africa
- Cause of death: Assassination by gunshot
- Other names: Witness D, Vlam
- Occupations: Private security company owner, former SAPS official
- Known for: Whistleblower testimony at the Madlanga Commission of Inquiry (as "Witness D")

Marius van der Merwe (1984 – 5 December 2025), also known by the alias "Vlam" and the codename "Witness D" during his testimony at the Madlanga Commission, was a South African private security company owner, former South African Police Services (SAPS) official, and key whistleblower who provided evidence to the Judicial Commission of Inquiry into Criminality, Political Interference, and Corruption in the Criminal Justice System.

He was assassinated outside his home in Brakpan, Gauteng, on 5 December 2025, shortly after providing critical testimony regarding corruption and police misconduct, particularly within the Ekurhuleni Metropolitan Police Department (EMPD). His murder sparked national outrage and condemnation from political parties and civil society, raising urgent concerns about the state of whistleblower protection in South Africa.

== Background and career ==
Van der Merwe was a former member of the EMPD. Following his resignation from the EMPD, he established his own private security company, QRF Task Team, which was reportedly active in combating illegal activities in the East Rand area of Gauteng. His work included operations against the bulk theft of diesel and coal, and his company's efforts were often focused on anti-illegal mining syndicates, locally known as "zama-zamas".

== Madlanga Commission testimony ==
Van der Merwe testified before the Madlanga Commission of Inquiry, which was established by President Cyril Ramaphosa in July 2025. His testimony, for which he was granted the protective codename "Witness D," focused on exposing alleged widespread criminality, the shielding of criminal networks, and political interference in the justice system, with a specific focus on the Ekurhuleni Metropolitan Municipality and the EMPD.

His most serious and publicized allegation involved an incident from April 2022. Van der Merwe testified that he was present at an unofficial interrogation site in Brakpan where a Mozambican suspect, Emmanuel Mbense, was allegedly tortured, including using a method known as "tubing", by a group of EMPD officers and private security members. Mbense reportedly died as a result. One of this private security members and police informant Wiandre Pretorius, survived an assassination in February 2026 when his car was shot 16 times. He committed suicide a few days later after the incident.

Van der Merwe alleged that the then-suspended EMPD Acting Chief, Brigadier Julius Mkhwanazi, instructed him to dispose of the body, either in a mine shaft or Spaarwater Dam, to cover up the murder. Van der Merwe stated he complied out of fear but later reported the matter to the Directorate for Priority Crime Investigation (DPCI) (the Hawks) and the Independent Police Investigative Directorate (IPID). Mkhwanazi denied the allegations during his own testimony.

In his testimony, Van der Merwe stated, "I fear this group and others like it... If they're not stopped, public trust in the police will collapse"

== Assassination ==
Van der Merwe was gunned down on the evening of Friday, 5 December 2025, outside his home in Brenthurst, Brakpan. He was killed in front of his wife and children.

Van der Merwe, 41, was ambushed by gunmen as he arrived home with his wife and children and was attempting to open his entry gate on Gauld Street. Suspects opened fire with a high-calibre weapon, confirmed by police to be an AK-47 automatic rifle. He was shot multiple times and died at the scene. Nothing was stolen from him; his firearm, wallet, and cellphone were all found on his body, leading police to the conclusion that the motive was a targeted assassination intended to silence him.

Justice Minister Mmamoloko Kubayi stated that the commission had offered protection, but Van der Merwe declined it, believing he did not need it as he ran his own security company.

Addressing the media on 8 December 2025, Fannie Masemola confirmed that three persons of interest have been identified and one has been taken in for questioning.

=== Prior threats ===
Van der Merwe had expressed fear for his life following his testimony. Anti-crime activist Yusuf Abramjee posted that Van der Merwe had contacted him just days before his death, warning that he feared he would "probably going to be shot in the coming days." He had also allegedly reported a separate attempt on his life weeks earlier, where a vehicle attempted to ram him off the road.

== Whistleblower protection debate ==
The murder of Marius van der Merwe elicited widespread and forceful condemnation, serving as a pivotal moment in the discussion on whistleblower safety in South Africa.

President Cyril Ramaphosa issued a statement condemning the "heinous murder". He stated that the attack suggested Van der Merwe's testimony had "angered elements in our society who want to undermine the rule of law". Ramaphosa vowed that the government would "redouble our efforts to protect whistleblowers" and instructed the National Joint Operational and Intelligence Structure (NATJOINTS) to review protective measures for all commission witnesses.

The South African Police Service (SAPS) launched a national manhunt for the killers. National Commissioner of SAPS, General Fannie Masemola, confirmed he would meet with Justice Mbuyiseli Madlanga to discuss the investigation]. Deputy Gauteng Police Commissioner Fred Kekana visited the scene, vowing to "deal with it thoroughly."

The Democratic Alliance (DA) condemned the "mafia-state behaviour", and the Freedom Front Plus (VF Plus) stated the assassination was a "calculated attack" aimed at protecting "mafia syndicates." Both parties demanded an urgent strengthening of whistleblower protection laws.

Amnesty International South Africa warned that the killing could deter future witnesses, stating, "This is not only an attack on an individual but also on justice and accountability in South Africa."

On 18 November 2025, the family of Emmanuel Mbense approached AfriForum after getting no assistance from the police. In a letter to Adv. Gerrie Nel, Head of the AfriForum Private Prosecution Unit, they said, "IPID's conduct suggests that the implicated parties are being shielded from investigation and prosecution and that it appears that almost all law enforcement agencies' alleged levels of incompetence and criminal conduct can no longer be kept secret."

== Arrests ==
On 15 March 2026, Matiphandile Sotheni, the man accused of the murder of Van der Merwe, was arrested. He appeared in front of a magistrate on 16 March 2026 but his case was postponed for a bail hearing. Reports revealed that Sotheni was an ex-SAPS and a Special Forces Task Team member. Further investigation revealed that he was being driven in his girlfriend's car by Wiandre Pretorius on the day Van der Merwe was killed. Wiandre was a suspect in the killing of Emmanuel Mbense after being mentioned at the Madlanga Commission by Van der Merwe. Pretorius committed suicide by shooting himself in front of his fiancee at a fuel station in Brakpan on 7 February 2026.

== See also ==
- Madlanga Commission
- Julius Mkhwanazi
- Jaco Hanekom
- Wiandre Pretorius
