= Wiandre Pretorius =

South African security operative and police informant

- Born: c. 1984
- Died: 7 February 2026; Brakpan, Gauteng, South Africa
- Occupations: Security operative, police reservist, alleged police informant
- Known for: Madlanga Commission investigations, Emmanuel Mbense case, Marius van der Merwe murder investigation

Wiandre Pretorius (c. 1984 – 7 February 2026) was a South African private security operator, police reservist and alleged police informant who became publicly known after being implicated in investigations connected to the killing of Emmanuel Mbense and the assassination of Madlanga Commission whistleblower Marius van der Merwe. He died by suicide in Brakpan, Gauteng, in February 2026 while under investigation in connection with several criminal cases involving police and private security criminal networks in Gauteng.

== Background ==
Pretorius worked in private security and also served as a police reservist in Gauteng. His name entered the public domain after testimony presented at the Madlanga Commission of Inquiry, which was investigating allegations of corruption, criminal networks and political interference in the criminal justice system.

He was reportedly associated with individuals involved in private security operations and anti-crime activities in the Ekurhuleni area.

== Emmanuel Mbense case ==
Pretorius was implicated by whistleblower Marius van der Merwe, also known as Witness D at the Madlanga Commission, in connection with the death of Emmanuel Mbense.

According to testimony and police investigations, Mbense was allegedly interrogated and tortured by individuals linked to police and private security structures before his death on 15 April 2020. His body was later disposed of at Duduza dam, on orders of Julius Mkhwanazi .Police later indicated that multiple deaths and attempted murders were connected to individuals linked to the Mbense investigation, describing the situation as a "deadly trail" connected to the case.

== Attempted assassination ==
In early February 2026, Pretorius survived an apparent assassination attempt outside his home in Boksburg when gunmen opened fire on his vehicle, striking it multiple times. Police opened an attempted murder case following the attack.

== Death ==
On 7 February 2026, Pretorius died by suicide after shooting himself at a filling station in Brakpan, Gauteng. The incident reportedly occurred in front of his fiancée, who was also implicated and is now suspended from the police service. Police opened an inquest docket following the incident. His death occurred only days after the attempted assassination and while police were investigating his alleged involvement in both the Mbense case and the murder of Marius van der Merwe.

On 18 August 2026, an IPID investigator told the court that Pretorius committed suicide because DNA evidence indicated that he was in the bedroom of Emmanuel Mbense when he was killed.

== Connection to the murder of Marius van der Merwe ==
Pretorius was identified by police as a person of interest in the December 2025 assassination of Marius van der Merwe, a key whistleblower who had testified at the Madlanga Commission.

Reports published in March 2026 indicated that Pretorius had allegedly been present on the day Van der Merwe was killed and was driving murder suspect Matipandile Sotheni, a former South African Police Service and Special Task Force member accused of carrying out the assassination.

Sotheni was arrested in March 2026 and appeared in court in connection with the murder of Van der Merwe.

== Investigations and related deaths ==
Pretorius' death formed part of a series of deaths connected to the Emmanuel Mbense case and the Madlanga Commission investigations. Authorities indicated that several individuals connected to the case had died under violent or suspicious circumstances, and investigations into criminal networks involving law enforcement officials, private security operators and organised crime continued.

== See also ==
- Julius Mkhwanazi
- Marius van der Merwe
- Jaco Hanekom
- Madlanga Commission
