= Political Killings Task Team (South African Police) =

South African police task team established in 2018

Political Killings Task Team (PKTT)
- Formation: 2018
- Type: Multi-disciplinary investigative task team
- Purpose: Investigation of politically-motivated killings in South Africa
- Headquarters: KwaZulu-Natal, South Africa
- Region served: South Africa
- Parent organization: South African Police Service (SAPS)

The Political Killings Task Team (PKTT) is an investigative task team established by the South African Police Service (SAPS) in 2018 to investigate politically motivated murders, primarily in KwaZulu-Natal.

The task team became the focus of national attention and controversy on 6 July 2025 after its disbandment directive by Police Minister Senzo Mchunu in December 2024.

As of late 2025, the PKTT remains in full operation after Masemola ordered dockets to be returned to it. The decision is pending final parliamentary recommendations. Minister Mchunu confirmed that although a directive existed, the unit had not been fully shut down.

== Establishment ==
The PKTT was created in 2018 following a surge of political killings in KwaZulu-Natal, a province long plagued by politically-linked violence. The team was designed as a multi-disciplinary structure bringing together members of the South African Police Service, the National Prosecuting Authority (NPA) and other state agencies like crime intelligence. The team operated under the oversight of the Inter-Ministerial Committee on Political Killings chaired by the Minister of Police Department.

Its mandate was to investigate and resolve politically motivated murders across South Africa, especially in KwaZulu-Natal. following Sindiso Magaqa's murder in September 2017.

According to SAPS reports cited in Parliament, by 2025 the PKTT had handled over 600 case dockets - 125 under investigation, 114 before courts, and 217 finalised - with what police leadership described as one of the best detection and conviction rates among SAPS task teams.

The unit initially reported to the KwaZulu-Natal Provincial Commissioner, Lieutenant-General Nhlanhla Mkhwanazi, and ultimately to the National Commissioner of SAPS. It coordinated with prosecutors through the NPA for case preparation and witness protection measures.

The PKTT played a major role in curbing politically linked killings and was credited with solving several high-profile assassination cases in KwaZulu-Natal. Its disbandment sparked public debate about the politicisation of law enforcement and transparency within SAPS.

The decision immediately drew criticism from SAPS leadership and opposition politicians. KwaZulu-Natal Police Commissioner Nhlanhla Mkhwanazi objected to the move, arguing that the PKTT was “the only successful task team in the country” and that its dissolution would derail ongoing investigations.

Analysts and civil society groups raised concerns that the decision could embolden political hitmen and undermine accountability in local government corruption cases.

It started on 31 December 2024 when Police Minister Senzo Mchunu issued a formal directive ordering the disbandment of the PKTT, stating that "its further existence is no longer required, nor is it adding any value to policing in South Africa."

Mkhwanazi alleged that over 120 active dockets were removed from the PKTT and reassigned to Deputy National Commissioner, Shadrack Sibiya, without his approval as the head of province overseeing the pilical murders, halting imminent arrests and compromising investigations, perhaps over claims that those disbanding the unit have interest in the political criminal underworld.

In contrast, Minister Mchunu defended his decision, claiming the PKTT was never a formal SAPS unit but a “temporary group” created for a specific purpose that had since been achieved.

In 2025, the South African Parliament established an enquiry, called the 'Ad Hoc Committee on the Allegations by General Mkhwanazi', to investigate the disbandment of the PKTT and related claims of corruption, political interference and obstruction within SAPS.

Testimonies by police officials, including former National Commissioner Fannie Masemola, suggested the directive’s timing and motivation were “suspicious and questionable”, given its successes. Mkhwanazi also testified that he believed Minister Mchunu had been pressured to sign the disbandment letter.
