= Fannie Masemola =

South African law enforcement official

General Fannie Masemola
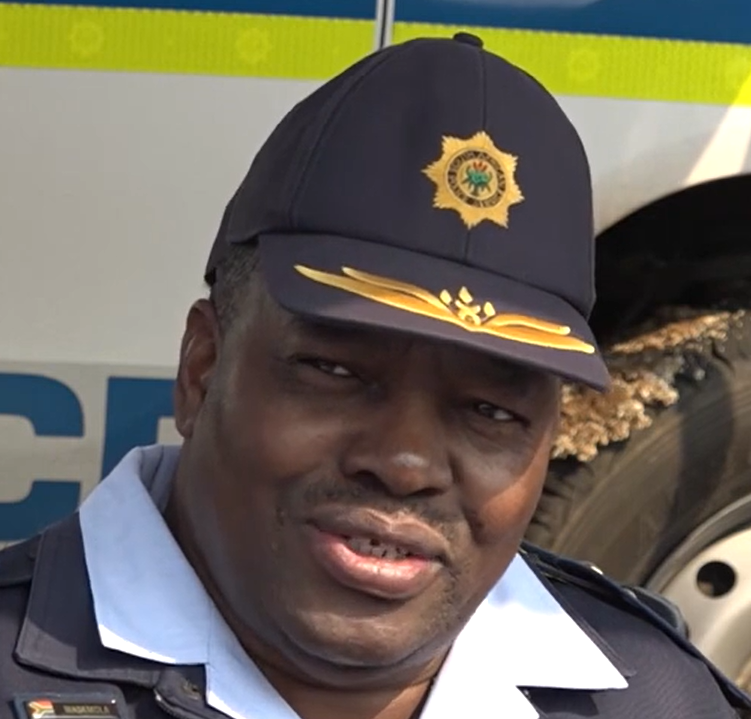
- Masemola in 2024

National Commissioner of the South African Police Service
- Reinstated
- In office 31 March 2022 – Recent
- President: Cyril Ramaphosa
- Preceded by: Khehla John Sitole
- Succeeded by: Puleng Dimpane (Acting) April-September 2026

Personal details
- Born: 1964 (age 61–62) Groblersdal, Limpopo, South Africa
- Education: Diploma in Policing; Higher Diploma in Policing; Master's in Public Management
- Profession: Law Enforcement Executive

Military service
- Allegiance: South Africa
- Branch/service: South African Police Service
- Years of service: 1987–2026
- Rank: General; Commissioner

Sehlahle Fannie Masemola (born 1964) is a South African police officer who served as the National Commissioner of the South African Police Service from 2022 until his suspension in April 2026 and was reinstated on October 2026. President Cyril Ramaphosa lifted his precautionary suspension on 16 October 2026, following the withdrawal of the criminal charges against him, and he resumed his duties on 19 October.

== Early life ==
Sehlahle Fannie Masemola was born in 1964 in Groblersdal in the Limpopo province of South Africa. Masemola grew up in a family of policemen and was fascinated by the law enforcement profession from a young age. In 1987 he joined the South African Police Services.

== Education and career ==
Masemola has both a Diploma and a Higher Diploma in Policing and as well as a Masters in Public Management. He served 10 years in KwaZulu-Natal where he was also the Deputy Provincial Commissioner, at the rank of Major General, in charge of operations before he was transferred to Pretoria in 2010 as the Acting Divisional Commissioner of Protection and Security Services. He remained a Major General until October 2010 when he was promoted to the rank of Lieutenant General to head the Division, Protection and Security Services.

== Corruption Allegations ==
In August 2025, it was reported that Masemola faced arrest over allegations of corruption. Masemola is alleged to have abused slush funds from the secret service account of crime intelligence and purchased two properties in Pretoria (Veroz Boutique Hotel) and Midrand (Kyalami Lodge) without adhering to proper procedures. One of Masemola's accomplices, Lieutenant-General Dumisani Khumalo who heads crime intelligence, has been arrested for fraud and corruption related to the purchase of a boutique hotel in Pretoria North, reportedly acquired for R22.7 million and a commercial building in Durban, valued at R22.8m million The Investigating Directorate Against Corruption denied that any warrant for his arrest had been issued, calling the reports unfounded, and emphasized that these allegations remain unproven in court.

In September 2025, Masemola suspended his deputy, Shadrack Sibiya, over allegations by Kwazulu Natal Police Commissioner Lt-Gen, Nhlanhla Mkhwanazi, that Sibiya tried to disband the task team investigating political assassinations in the province. Masemola also appeared in front of Madlanga Commission to give evidence into the allegations that the police were working with and protecting criminals. He accused suspended Police Minister Senzo Mchunu of exceeding his constitutional mandate by ordering the immediate disbandment of the Political Killings Task Team in 2024.

In April 2026, suspended Mpumalanga Police Commissioner Daphney Manamela hosted a media briefing in Mbombela and accused football administrator and businessman Bobby Motaung of giving a bribe totaling 5 million rand to Masemola. This was for the murder case of Jimmy Mohlala, who blew the whistle on the construction of the Mbombela Stadium, where Motaung had interests.

=== Medicare24 Tender Scandal ===
In April 2024, a R 360 million contract was awarded to Vusimuzi Matlala's Medicare24 company to provide medical services within the Tshwane District. The contract was cancelled by Masemola in May 2025 after an audit report found irregularities.

In November 2025, Brown Mogotsi testified at the Madlanga Commission that Masemola allegedly received R7 million rand from Vusimuzi Matlala after he got the police tender worth R360 million rand. In March 2026, Masemola was served with a warrant to appear on April 21, 2026 for his role in the awarding and approving of the tender. Masemola appeared in the Pretoria Magistrate's Court on April 21, 2026, facing four charges under the Public Finance Management Act. Twelve police officials, three company directors, and Matlala were also charged with fraud, corruption, and money laundering related to the procurement of the police healthcare contract.

Masemola did not enter a plea and the case was postponed to May 13, 2026, when all co-accused are scheduled to appear together in court. Masemola has denied the allegations.

== Suspension ==
On April 23, 2026, President Cyril Ramaphosa placed Masemola on precautionary suspension, making him the fourth permanent head of the South African Police Service to be removed or suspended before completing a term in office. Lieutenant-General Puleng Dimpane, currently the CFO for the SAPS, was appointed as acting national police commissioner.

In his address, Ramaphosa stated: "In consideration of the seriousness of these charges and the critical role that the national commissioner of police plays in leading the fight against crime, I have agreed with Gen Masemola that he be on precautionary suspension pending the conclusion of the case."

== IDAC Controversies ==
The National Director Of Public Prosecutions at the NPA (National Prosecuting Authority) whom IDAC (Investigating Directorate Against Corruption) reports to ordered an Independent case review panel to look into the charges against General Masemola after the Investigating Director of the Investigating Directorate Against Corruption (IDAC) Advocate Shamila Bathohi resigned after facing tough questions about the charges at the Madlanga Commission of enquiry steaming from evidence given before by state advocate in the IDAC prosecutor Drushanta Ramsamy who alleged the charges were unlawful.

The Chairperson of the Commission Acting Deputy Chief Justice Madlanga made an inference that a first year legal student would not even utilize the provisions of law used to charge General Masemola as they were a misdirection of law, spurious, unfactual and an abuse of prosecutorial authority to charge him the way it was done, which begs the belief that it was meant to impugn his integrity and embarrass Him while violating his human rights.

== Charges Withdrawal ==
The NDPP of the NPA ordered the charges against General Masemola withdrawn after an independent case review panel consisting of senior state advocates and deputy directors of public prosecutions from the National Prosecutions Services and other units of the NPA with reference and review by an outside Senior Counsel 'Silk' who agreed with the panel that the charges should be withdrawn as there was no prospect of success in prosecution.

== Reinstatement ==
On the 16 of October 2026 the President of South Africa Cyril Ramaphosa lifted the suspension of General Masemola who has since resumed his duties.
