= Cat Matlala =

South African businessman and tenderpreneur

Vusimuzi "Cat" Matlala
- Born: Vusimuzi Matlala; 1976 (age 49–50)
- Education: Lethlabile High School
- Occupation: Businessman
- Known for: Government contracts; alleged role in policing/tender controversies; named at the Madlanga Commission
- Criminal charges: Alleged charges including attempted murder, illegal possession of firearms, fraud and related counts (as October of 2025)
- Criminal status: Facing charges / Remand / On trial / Convicted

Vusimuzi “Cat” Matlala is a South African tender tycoon and criminal suspect known for his involvement in large state contracts and related controversies. Owner of a security company called Cat VIP Protection Services, Matlala was raised and is based in Mamelodi, Pretoria. He has been described in the media as a “security boss” and “tenderpreneur” and is currently under arrest for masterminding the attempted murder of his ex-lover.

Matlala directs 4 companies in the security and medical services sectors. For example, he was the sole director of Medicare 24 Tshwane District, a company providing health risk management services, and an active director of Cat VIP Protection Services, Falcon Cat Trading and Suppliers, Lux South African Investments Pty Ltd, Cor Kabeng Trading & Suppliers and Black AK Trading. Through these firms, he expanded into government procurement and health services contracts.

== Early life and personal life ==
Media reports and parliamentary testimony indicate that Matlala grew up in Mamelodi East, Pretoria, where he was raised by a single mother and attended school in the area. In his evidence before Parliament’s ad hoc committee on alleged corruption and political interference in the criminal justice system, he described starting informal businesses after school, buying and reselling goods before moving into private security work.

TimesLIVE has described him as a long-time Mamelodi resident who later established himself as a Pretoria-based businessman and tenderpreneur. During the same ad hoc committee appearance he confirmed that he had previously been convicted of housebreaking in 2001, a conviction he said was followed by his later move into the security business.

== Career ==
Matlala built a career in private security and healthcare procurement. In addition to Medicare 24, he runs security-related companies. He has steered Black AK Trading and Cor Kabeng Trading (small firms registered in 2017) which became involved in hospital supply contracts. Investigators noted that Black AK and Cor Kabeng were created shortly before they won bids, and Matlala remained listed as the director of both.

In the security sector, Matlala is known to oversee Cat Protection and Security and Cat VIP Holdings. These firms have provided security and related services. His business dealings gained high public profile after a series of government contracts in the mid-2020s. Media investigations highlight that he “rose to prominence through a series of lucrative contracts with the South African government”. His companies won multiple tenders, but also attracted scrutiny by auditors and investigators.

Matlala's net worth is estimated between R100-R150 million.

== Tender involvement ==
Matlala's name has been linked to several major government tender contracts. In 2021, whistleblower Babita Deokaran, head of the Gauteng health department's anti-corruption unit, flagged irregularities in contracts at Tembisa Hospital that were awarded to companies he controlled. Deokaran's team identified millions of rand spent on goods and services from Black AK Trading & Suppliers and Cor Kabeng Trading & Suppliers, and proposed fraud charges against the firms. Deokaran was murdered in August 2021 before the investigation could conclude. The Special Investigating Unit and Hawks later conducted parallel probes into these hospital contracts, with Matlala named as the director of the involved firms. In September the SIU released its interim reports and has traced 41 suppliers or service providers linked to Tembisa hospital and three of the companies that were awarded contracts to the value of R13 538 292 in this syndicate are linked to Vusimuzi Matlala.

In 2024, Matlala's company Medicare 24 Tshwane District was awarded a three-year health services contract with the South African Police Service (SAPS) worth R360 million. Under this contract, Medicare 24 was to provide medical assessments and wellness services to roughly 180,000 police members. Bidding award documents published by the police, in June 2024, confirm Matlala's company was the only successful bidder for the R360m contract. This award drew immediate attention: investigators later uncovered evidence of fronting and collusion, and police officials admitted the tender had been “flagged for fraud and other crimes”. In mid-2025 the contract was abruptly cancelled by national police commissioner Fannie Masemola, citing irregularities.

== Criminal charges and corruption allegations ==
=== Alleged withdrawn charges ===
- Around the year 2000, he was arrested in two “theft-from-vehicle” cases. Those cases were later withdrawn.
- In 2006, he was arrested in connection with a cash-in-transit heist, but was acquitted.
- In 2011, he was linked to a car theft allegation. That case was also dropped.
- In 2012, he faced at least one assault charge, which was likewise withdrawn.
- A house robbery case in 2013 linked to him was also dropped.
- In 2015, he faced a carjacking allegation - again withdrawn.
- In 2016, he was accused of possession of an unlicensed firearm, impersonating a police officer, and resisting or obstructing police officers - charges that were withdrawn.
- In 2018, he was allegedly charged with attempted murder, but the case was withdrawn.

=== Current charges ===
On 14 May 2025, Matlala was arrested and charged with multiple offenses. According to court documents, he faces charges of attempted murder, conspiracy to commit murder, and money laundering. These charges relate in part to a 2023 incident in which a vehicle carrying his former girlfriend, South African actress Tebogo Thobejane, was shot at near Sandton. Matlala is accused of orchestrating this hit, but he has denied any involvement or motive. Thobejane was wounded in the leg and later fled the country, saying she feared for her life. He has pleaded not guilty to all charges and remains in custody after being denied bail, on 17 September 2025, on grounds that he is a flight risk and danger to society.

In bail hearings, authorities noted several factors suggesting Matlala could evade prosecution: they alleged he possessed a fraudulent Eswatini identity document and offshore assets (such as a private jet and foreign bank accounts) that could aid flight. Matlala has denied these claims, refuting ownership of the assets and blaming investigators for planting evidence.

Beyond the criminal charges, Matlala has been implicated in wider allegations of “police capture,” claims that senior police officials were improperly influenced by business figures. It is reported that investigators consider him a central figure in such allegations, which contributed to the launch of the Madlanga Commission of Inquiry into SAPS corruption. Former police minister Bheki Cele admitted to meeting Matlala weeks before the R360m tender was cancelled. As a result, Matlala's business dealings and political connections have drawn intense public and official scrutiny in South Africa. On 29 September 2025, Crime Intelligence boss Dumisani Khumalo provided further information into a sophisticated organized criminal syndicate, called the “Big Five” which Matlala is part of. He mentioned The cartel, which is based in Gauteng, is allegedly involved in various sectors of organized crime, including drug trafficking, hijackings, tender fraud, and contract killings.

== Madlanga Commission ==
In October 2025, a witness revealed about a document called Memo Biz Traces that included details about President Cyril Ramaphosa's apparent multiple identity numbers.

Evidence presented at the Madlanga Commission of Inquiry, primarily through WhatsApp chats retrieved from Matlala's phone, has revealed alleged criminal infiltration at the highest levels of the SAPS. The messages, introduced by Crime Intelligence Head Lt-Gen Dumisani Khumalo, link Matlala to an influential North West businessman, Brown Mogotsi, who is closely associated with suspended Police Minister Senzo Mchunu. These communications indicate Matlala funded ANC political expenses through Mogotsi in exchange for favours, which included information and alleged efforts to prevent the cancellation of his multi-million-rand SAPS health contract. Khumalo also revealed that Matlala is one of the members of a cartel known as the "Big Five" as well as Katiso Molefe, the other three members were not revealed.

Deputy National Police Commissioner Lt-Gen Shadrack Sibiya testified before a parliamentary ad hoc committee, where he admitted to having contact with both Matlala and Mogotsi but vehemently denied any personal relationship or involvement in the alleged corruption and the attempt to disband the Political Killings Task Team (PKTT). Sibiya's limited interactions with Matlala were explained as professional dealings regarding a tender dispute, while he claimed Mogotsi was an "activist" who occasionally provided him with information. According to Witness C, an investigator within Gauteng counterintelligence operations who was giving evidence, a transcribed dialogue reveals Matlala conceding to compensating Sibiya up to R1 million monthly in currency for him to secure a police tender.

Matlala remains in custody after the Alexandra Magistrate’s Court denied his bail application, citing him as a flight risk with substantial resources and influence. His legal team elevated his bail application to the Gauteng High Court in Johannesburg in an attempt to overturn the lower‐court denial. However, on 27 October 2025, Matlala had his bail application denied. An article in the Daily Maverick urges that Matlala should be declared a “National Key Point.” The article highlights how deeply his alleged influence has penetrated state institutions. The article argues that his business and political connections, particularly in state security, policing, and tenders, have made him a pivotal figure in South Africa’s “capture” debates.

Crime-intelligence testimony has linked Katiso Molefe to Matlala. Both are part of the “Big Five cartel” (a syndicate alleged to engage in things like contract killings, tender fraud, kidnappings, drug distribution, and cross-border hijackings). Molefe has been charged with the murder of an engineer, and ballistic evidence links a rifle used in that case also to the attempted murder of a person linked to Matlala.

Giving his testimony in November 2025, Brown Mogotsi mentioned that Vusi “CAT” Matlala was referred to as “John Wick” in Crime Intelligence circles as well as around communities in Tshwane, where he assassinated gang members belonging to Boko Haram in Mamelodi.

In January 2026 the commission revealed Whatsapp communication between Matlala and Kwazulu Natal Hawks head, Major‑General Lesetja Senona. The messages showed that Senona shared confidential and sensitive police information with Matlala. Senona's son was also mentioned as having business ties with Matlala. During the commission session, Senona was asked to shed light into messages that might have been referring to Babaita Deokaran sent by Matlala before her murder.

=== Ekurhuleni Metropolitan Police Department (EMPD) Crimes and Corruption ===
Suspended Ekurhuleni Metropolitan Police Department head, Julius Mkhwanazi, has been linked to Matlala after it emerged that he played a part in the signing of an agreement between the EMPD and Matlala’s security company, which did not follow the correct protocols.

== Business interests and SAPS health contract ==
Investigative reporting has linked Matlala to several companies in the security and healthcare sectors, including the health-risk management firm Medicare 24 Tshwane District, which provided services to state institutions. MedicalBrief and News24 reported that, through these entities, he benefitted from contracts with Gauteng health facilities and later with the South African Police Service (SAPS).

In 2024, Medicare 24 Tshwane District was awarded a three-year SAPS occupational health and wellness tender worth approximately R360 million, covering medical assessments and related services for police personnel nationwide. News24 investigations later alleged fronting and compliance problems around the bid, including the use of a “placeholder” director and links between bid committee members and the winning company.

The SAPS chief financial officer subsequently told the parliamentary ad hoc committee that the Medicare 24 contract had become an “embarrassment” and was flagged as irregular expenditure by internal controls. In mid-2025, national commissioner Fannie Masemola cancelled the contract and indicated that the tender would be re-advertised after audits and tighter procurement controls. Matlala has argued in court that the cancellation led to the loss of around 52 jobs at Medicare 24.

== Parliamentary ad hoc committee testimony ==
In November 2025, Matlala testified from Kgosi Mampuru Correctional Centre before Parliament’s ad hoc committee investigating alleged corruption and political interference in the criminal justice system. His appearance attracted public attention both because he gave evidence while shackled and because he wore designer clothing, including Fendi and Burberry items, which sparked criticism about displays of wealth by a remand prisoner.

During his sworn testimony, he acknowledged his 2001 housebreaking conviction, outlined his path into private security and denied that he is part of a criminal cartel, insisting he is a legitimate businessman.

One of the most widely reported aspects of his evidence concerned payments he says he made to former police minister Bheki Cele. Matlala told the committee that Cele had contacted him asking for money, allegedly citing problems with his wife’s car, and that he ultimately gave him R500,000 in cash – R300,000 at his Pretoria penthouse and a further R200,000 at the Beverly Hills Hotel in KwaZulu-Natal. He said he often carried cash in a Woolworths shopping bag, which he referred to as his “money bag”, and claimed that part of the money was handed to Cele in a vehicle outside the hotel. Matlala accused Cele of having “lied under oath” when the former minister earlier told the same committee that his meetings with Matlala were solely to gather information about corruption.

He further testified about his relationship with businessman Brown Mogotsi, describing him as an associate involved in political fundraising, and about meetings arranged with senior police officials regarding problems in implementing the R360 million SAPS health contract.

== Alleged role in the "Big Five" cartel and Madlanga Commission ==
The Judicial Commission of Inquiry into Criminality, Political Interference, and Corruption in the Criminal Justice System – commonly known as the Madlanga Commission – was established in July 2025 to investigate allegations that politicians, senior police officials and elements of the justice system were captured by organised crime.

At the commission, Crime Intelligence head Lieutenant General Dumisani Khumalo testified that an organised crime network he called the “Big Five” cartel operates primarily from Gauteng and engages in activities such as drug trafficking, hijackings, tender fraud and contract killings. Khumalo said that phone records and WhatsApp messages from Matlala’s devices showed him as one of the leaders of this Gauteng-based syndicate and linked him to businessman Brown Mogotsi, who allegedly channelled payments to African National Congress (ANC) events and delegates.

According to Khumalo’s evidence, the messages pointed to alleged attempts to influence decisions such as the disbandment of the Political Killings Task Team and to pressure investigators in favour of Matlala and his associates. He further alleged that the cartel cultivated relationships with senior police officers and politicians to shield its members from prosecution and to protect lucrative tenders, including the SAPS health-services contract awarded to Medicare 24. Matlala has denied being part of any criminal cartel, insisting in his parliamentary testimony that he is not a drug dealer and that his business activities are lawful.

In January 2026 News24 has reported that Matlala wanted to build a luxury private terminal that could have allowed selected individuals to bypass immigration and security. For this he was asking R70 million from Nedbank and "The Green Lounge" would have included fine dining, bars, smoking rooms and sleep pods for its clients. In February 2026 News 24 reported that Matlalas wife, Tsakane Matlala, scored a R3.7-million tender at the Ekurhuleni Metropolitan Municipality contract using a company she had just formed 10 days before getting the tender.

== See also ==
- Madlanga Commission
- Senzo Mchunu
- Fannie Masemola
- Katiso Molefe
- Nhlanhla Mkhwanazi
