= Brown Mogotsi =

South African businessman

Oupa Brown Mogotsi known just as Brown Mogotsi, is a South African businessman from the North West province who has become a central figure in allegations of corruption, political interference, and leaks of confidential police information. He is prominently discussed in relation to the Madlanga Commission of Inquiry into Criminality, Political Interference and Corruption in the Criminal Justice System.

In July 2025 he told Sunday World that he had been involved, in an informant or “undercover” capacity, in intelligence work and claimed involvement in the operation that led to the arrest of fugitive Thabo Bester, assertions that attracted attention because they bear on whether Mogotsi acted as a formal or informal state source. These claims have not been independently verified in court, they are reported as Mogotsi's statements.

== Criminal record ==
His criminal record includes convictions for assault with intent to cause grievous bodily harm (GBH), defeating the ends of justice, and reckless driving, among other offences. Several of his earlier cases date back to as early as 1997. Over the years, he has also faced multiple charges in the North West province for assault, theft,murder and fraud.

== Brown Mogotsi Foundation ==
Through the Brown Mogotsi Foundation, he also opposed the administration of former North West premier Supra Mahumapelo. In 2023, the foundation filed an application to interdict a R1-billion catering tender for North West health facilities, stating that the process was irregular and required intervention in the public interest. The application resulted in disruptions and financial impacts for the North West Department of Health.

== Allegations and the Madlanga Commission ==
The Madlanga Commission has heard several serious allegations against Mogotsi, based on WhatsApp messages and testimony from senior police and intelligence officials. According to crime intelligence head Lt. Gen. Dumisani Khumalo, Mogotsi is alleged to have facilitated payments from businessman Vusimuzi "Cat" Matlala in exchange for favors, including access to classified South African Police Service (SAPS) documents, leaks of police operations, and influence over SAPS tenders. A key highlighted transaction involved a payment of about R38,000 to Gotlhe Specialists, a business linked to Mogotsi, which then transferred money to him. Khumalo claims Mogotsi used his connections (including to Police Minister Senzo Mchunu) to obtain influence over contacts in the ANC, to the point where some of these funds were used for ANC or political event funding. It's alleged that Mogotsi was informed about police operations, raids, or disbandment of specialized police units ahead of others, potentially via leaked or shared information.

Witnesses have alleged that Mogotsi acted as an intermediary between businesspeople and serving or former SAPS officials, including claims that he had access to sensitive crime-intelligence information and used connections to influence tender and operational outcomes. Mogotsi was issued a Rule 3 notice by the commission and asked to respond to the allegations. In October 2025, Mogotsi requested additional time from the commission to prepare his response.

On 16 October 2025, Mogotsi's business in Mahikeng, in the North West province, was raided, following information that was presented to the ad hoc committee at the commission. The police were searching for confidential police documents and electronic devices, but he was not at the site when officers arrived. The raid formed part of an ongoing investigation, and after a failed attempt to locate him, police are reported to be looking for Mogotsi. In an interview with ENCA, Mogotsi said that although the raid was within the bounds of the law, he fears for his life.

Mogotsi said that he intends to hand over his digital devices at the Sandton Police Station and said he is willing to appear and give evidence at the Madlanga Commission. Mogotsi has threatened to name other people who allegedly received funds from Matlala and has pushed back on claims the ANC has distanced itself from him, insisting he remains a party member.

On 4 November 2025, it was reported that Mogotsi survived an attempt on his life at Vosloorus when four men shot 11 bullets at his car at around 10pm on 2 November 2025. After this incident, police were looking for Mogotsi to give a statement. Police have been looking for him since October 2025 regarding confiscation of his devices in relation to the commission's investigation. He initially said that he would avail himself at the Vosloorus Police Station but did not pitch. He later met with police, accompanied by his lawyer, to give a statement regarding this incident.

Testifying before the ad hoc committee, Chief of Staff Cedric Nkabinde has stated that suspended police minister Senzo Mchunu directed him to arrange meetings with Mogotsi and other ANC members at the minister’s residences. Nkabinde noted that, despite coordinating the logistics, he was not permitted to attend the meetings themselves. Nkabinde said he facilitated two meetings between Mchunu and Mogotsi, one of which did not materialise. Mchunu said that he regards Mogotsi as a political "comrade" and not as an "associate."

On 11 November 2025 Mogotsi appeared at the Madlanga Commission, where he mentioned that Vusi Matlala is known as "John Wick" in the Crime Intelligence circles. John Wick is known to have killed and terrorized members of the Boko Haram gang in Mamelodi, Tshwane, since 2018.

On 18 November 2025, Mogotsi took the stand at the Commission and made the claim that he worked as a police informant and crime-intelligence “contact agent” and alleged that police commissioner Lt. Gen. Nhlanhla Mkhwanazi and King Misuzulu ka Zwelithini had been recruited by the CIA. He said his work began in the ANC’s military wing in the 1990s and expanded after he uncovered criminal activity, explaining that his role involved clandestine investigations and creating false identities, a practice he described as “legend building.” Mogotsi alleged Mkhwanazi’s US degree was part of why he was given orders to use the Political Killings Task Team (PKTT) in ways that served Western interests and to intimidate government officials. Brown Mogotsi blames home affairs for the wrong date of birth.

== Parliamentary testimony and differing accounts ==
Senior police officials have given conflicting accounts before parliamentary and commission processes about the nature and depth of their contacts with Mogotsi.

Shadrack Sibiya, the suspended Deputy National Commissioner for Crime Detection, told Parliament's ad-hoc committee that he knows Mogotsi and Vusimuzi “Cat” Matlala and described limited face-to-face encounters (for example, at an ANC January 8 event), while seeking to distance himself from any improper relationship. Sibiya said he met Mogotsi a small number of times and described interactions that he characterized as non-personal and professional.

At the same time Sibiya denied acting on behalf of others in the matters alleged and cast doubt on the authenticity of some WhatsApp messages relied on by other witnesses; he told committee members he had met Mogotsi only a few times and rejected assertions that he had been part of conspiratorial meetings.

Sibiya also said that when Mogotsi raised concerns about Crime Intelligence following him, Sibiya alerted the National Commissioner and used the information to his advantage for personal safety, an account reported as reflecting the complicated operational and personal interactions between civilians offering information and police officials.

== Arrest ==
On 15 May 2026, Mogotsi was arrested for defeating the ends of justice, stemming from a November 2025 shooting that he allegedly staged in Vosloorus and later reported as an attempted assassination on his life.

== Political affiliation ==
The African National Congress (ANC) has publicly stated that Mogotsi's membership had lapsed (the party has distanced itself from him in light of the inquiries), while Mogotsi has at times asserted continuing ties or described himself as an ANC activist.

== See also ==
- Madlanga Commission
- Vusimuzi "Cat" Matlala
- Nhlanhla Mkhwanazi
- Shadrack Sibiya
