= Shadrack Sibiya =

South African policeman

Lieutenant-General Lieutenant General Shadrack Sibiya

Deputy National Commissioner for Crime Detection, South African Police Service
- In office 1 July 2023 – suspended in 2025

Personal details
- Born: Shadrack Sibiya; 1967 (age 58–59) Gauteng South Africa
- Occupation: Police officer
- Known for: Senior SAPS official; subject of controversies, suspension and parliamentary testimony concerning alleged interference in politically sensitive investigations

Shadrack Sibiya is a disgraced former South African police officer, born in 1967 in Johannesburg and married to Helen Sibiya his second wife. Sibiya resigned on 12 October 2026 from the position of Deputy National Commissioner - Crime Detection in the South African Police Service (SAPS) and was dismissed from the SAPS with a dishonorable discharge due to his involvement with drug cartel bosses such as Vusimusi Matlala and Katiso "KT" Molefe and after being charged with sexual offenses involving young girls. As one of the five Deputy National Commissioners, he is responsible for detectives. He rose through the SAPS command structure to senior rank and commanded the Gauteng Hawks - and in 2025, Sibiya became involved as a central figure in a high-profile dispute involving allegations of interference in sensitive police investigations, parliamentary testimony, searches of his home and the suspension of senior officials. His case has been the subject of court litigation and multiple state enquiries.

He began his policing career in his early twenties as a student constable at the Hammanskraal Academy. Over nearly four decades, he served in several divisions, including the detective branch in Knysna, and advanced to national investigative structures.

Sibiya rose through the ranks to become a senior investigator within the Directorate for Priority Crime Investigation (Hawks), where he led the Gauteng provincial branch and the Commercial Crimes unit at the rank of Brigadier. In 2015, he was dismissed from the SAPS following allegations relating to the illegal rendition of Zimbabwean nationals during his time in the Hawks, but the Labour Court later found his dismissal procedurally and substantively unfair and ordered his reinstatement.

Following that ruling, Sibiya joined the City of Johannesburg as head of the Group Forensic and Investigation Services (GFIS), where he led anti-corruption investigations in local government. In 2023 he returned to national policing and was promoted to the rank of Lieutenant-General when appointed Deputy National Commissioner for Crime Detection. In that capacity, he oversaw elements of the national crime-detection architecture and engaged with specialized units, task teams and intelligence.

== Suspension and legal challenges ==
In July 2025, Sibiya was placed on special leave (later described as suspension) by the National Police Commissioner, Fannie Masemola, after allegations emerged that he had interfered with the handling of a set of politically sensitive dockets held by the :Political Killings Task Team, a police unit established to probe political assassinations, and that Sibiya had sought to redirect the case dockets of the team to his office. Sibiya challenged aspects of his suspension in court, but in September 2025 a Pretoria High Court application to return to work was dismissed, with the court declining to overturn the decision placing him on leave while investigations continued.

Sibiya became a focus of public controversy after KwaZulu-Natal police head Lieutenant-General Nhlanhla Mkhwanazi and others made explosive public allegations about the disbandment by Sibiya and Police Minister Senzo Mchunu without knowledge of the National Commissioner and Mkhwanazi publicly accused senior figures like Sibiya, Mchunu and others of obstructing or undermining investigations; his allegations implicated an array of senior officials and prompted executive, parliamentary and prosecutorial responses.

Sibiya denied claims that he was a “rogue” officer and rejected suggestions that he colluded with criminals or unlawfully redirected dockets when he appeared to testify before the Ad Hoc Parliamentary Committee in October 2025 about his role and decisions in the disbandment. He denied friendships or improper relationships with named criminal suspects while admitting that he knew some individuals within the policing environment. The parliamentary committee has kept the matter under scrutiny and called for further investigation and evidence from affected parties.

In October 2025, law-enforcement units—including the National Intervention Unit, the Special Task Force, and sections of Crime Intelligence - executed a raid on Sibiya's house in Centurion and seized electronic devices to be forensically analyzed as part of ongoing investigations into Sibiya. Meanwhile, he described the raid as a politically motivated attack on him and said it formed part of intimidation attempts to target him ahead of his parliamentary testimony.

Sibiya was linked to a number of sensitive investigations—including those into politically motivated killings and the high-profile murder of public figures like Senzo Meyiwa—because of his senior investigative police role with the detective units under his oversight.

Sibiya's situation has contributed to political turbulence in South Africa's security sector. The allegations against him and other senior officials prompted calls for independent inquiries; they were one factor in President Cyril Ramaphosa’s decision to place Mchunu on special leave and establish the Madlanga Commission to probe claims of collusion between state officials and organized crime and to suspend senior political figures pending probe outcomes. Opposition parties and civic organizations have demanded transparency and swift action to restore public confidence in policing institutions.

Sibiya has been involved in civil litigation with the SAPS concerning the lawfulness of his suspension and administrative steps taken against him. Several investigations—internal disciplinary, criminal, and parliamentary—have continued to run in parallel, and further court processes are expected as evidence is reviewed and prosecution decisions are considered.

He has claimed that tension between him and Mkhwanazi are about the post of National Commissioner to be filled. In February 2025, Witness F told the Madlanga commission that Sibiya used him as a courier to collect cash from Katiso Molefe and Vusimuzi Matlala. Matlala has allegedly gifted 20 impalas to the suspended Deputy Police Commissioner.

== 2026 Criminal Charges ==
In September 2026, Sibiya was arrested and appeared in the Randburg Magistrates' Court on five charges, including rape, trafficking in persons and the sexual grooming of a child. The charges relate to alleged incidents involving an 18-year-old woman and a 16-year-old girl between May and August 2026. According to the prosecution, Sibiya allegedly raped the 18-year-old woman at a hotel in Sandton in May and later engaged in sexually explicit electronic communications with the 16-year-old girl. He also faces a trafficking charge relating to allegations that several people were transported for the purpose of sexual exploitation. Sibiya had not pleaded to the charges at his first court appearance. The case was postponed to 29 September 2026 for a formal bail hearing, with the State indicating that it would oppose bail.

Sibiya resigned with immediate effect at his disciplinary hearing on 12 October 2026 following charges of sexual offenses and human trafficking.
