= Tebogo Thobejane =

South African actress (born 1983)

- Born: 1983 (age 42–43); Johannesburg, South Africa
- Occupations: Entrepreneur, actress, podcaster
- Years active: 2010–present

Tebogo Thobejane is a South African entrepreneur, podcaster and actress. She is best known for playing the role of Belinda in the Muvhango television series on SABC 2.

== Early life ==
Thobejane was born on 30 November 1983 in Johannesburg, South Africa. Her late father is Obed Thobejane who co-founded Black Like Me and Principal Hair Products with Herman Mashaba in the 1990s.

== Acting career ==
After graduating with a Bachelor of Arts degree in Film Production from a South African university, Thobejane joined SABC 2 telenovela Muvhango as Belinda. Following her tenure on Muvhango, Thobejane joined the cast of Diep City, a popular Mzansi Magic drama series where she portrayed Tsholo. Thobejane also ventured into podcasting with the launch of City Girls with Tebogo Thobejane.

== Shooting ==
In October 2023, Thobejane and her friend were ambushed on the N1 highway near Sandton when a car they were traveling in was sprayed with bullets where she was shot in the foot, while her friend sustained a gunshot wound to the spinal cord. Vusimuzi Matlala, who is Thobejane's ex, was arrested by the crime intelligence unit for an alleged attempted murder. In July 2025 Matlala was arrested again with his wife and few others after it was found that the guns used to kill DJ Sumbody were the very same guns used to attack Thobejane and her friend. It was Kwazulu Natal police commissioner, Nhlanhla Mkhwanazi who detailed how Matlala allegedly paid suspended Police Minister, Senzo Mchunu to disband a police task team investigating his role in the attempted murder of Thobejane.Tebogo Thobejane has since rejected the witness protection offer from SAPS, citing a lack of trust from them.
