= Crossby Vusi Shongwe =

South African politician

Member of the National Assembly of South Africa
- Incumbent
- Assumed office 2024

Personal details
- Party: uMkhonto weSizwe Party

Crossby Vusi Shongwe is a South African politician and a member of Parliament (MP) for the uMkhonto weSizwe Party (MK).

== Parliamentary Ad Hoc Committee ==
In July 2025, Shongwe was chosen to be part of the parliamentary ad hoc committee established by Cyril Ramaphosa to probe allegations of corruption in the police and interference of politicians by KwaZulu-Natal Commissioner, Nhlanhla Mkhwanazi.

== Madlanga Commission ==
In June 2026, Shongwe testified before the Madlanga Commission of Inquiry that he was offered R10 million during a Durban virtual meeting with suspended Gauteng Crime Intelligence head Major-General Feroz Khan. This was after his questioning of Khan’s alleged links to illegal cigarette smuggling at a parliamentary ad hoc committee on South African Police Services. Shongwe also detailed the Aeroton drug bust, as well as claims of cover-ups related to the deaths of make-up artist Maja Janeska and Johannesburg anesthesiologist Dr. Abhulhay Munshi, who were killed in September 2020 and December 2022, respectively, and were linked to Khan. Shonwge also examined claims of cover-ups involving illicit cigarette smuggling, which Khan has been linked to, as two businessmen, Mohammadh Sayed and Adriano Mazzotti, were both associated with and were owners of the tobacco company called Carnilinx. Shongwe called this group an "Indian cabal" in the SAPS and said that it was running an underground network of influence and corruption within IDAC.

== See also ==
- List of National Assembly members of the 28th Parliament of South Africa
