= Jaco Hanekom =

South African whistleblower and police informant

- Died: March 17, 2023; South Africa
- Known for: Whistleblowing on alleged EMPD corruption

Jaco Hanekom (killed 17 March 2023) was a South African whistleblower and police informant whose killing became the subject of national attention following testimony at the Madlanga Commission. His death was linked in commission evidence to allegations of corruption, unlawful operations, and intimidation involving members of the Ekurhuleni Metropolitan Police Department (EMPD).

== Background ==
Hanekom acted as an informant to senior law enforcement figures, including retired deputy police chief Revo Spies. According to testimony at the Madlanga Commission, Hanekom provided evidence relating to alleged unlawful operations conducted by EMPD officers outside their jurisdiction where copper cables were confiscated. Hanekom was also mentioned at the Madlanga Commission by Marius van der Merwe also known as "Witness D" before his assassination in 2025. Van der Merwe testified to the commission about Mkhwanazi's and Matlala's involvement in the coverup, torture and murder of a robbery suspect, Emmanuel Mbense, a Mozambican national, in 2022. The suspect had apparently had a plastic bag put over his head to suffocate him until he confessed to the robbery. When the suspect died, van der Merwe testified that he was instructed by Mkhwanazi to dispose of the body and when the body was found later in a reservoir in Nigel, Jaco Hanekom told him that Julius Mkhwanazi would cover up the situation.

== Whistleblowing ==
In 2022, Hanekom obtained CCTV footage allegedly showing EMPD officers conducting an unauthorized operation at a workshop in Meyerton, outside the municipality's lawful policing area. The footage was said to depict the seizure of copper cable under the guise of a police operation. Spies testified that the operation shown in the footage was not recorded in official EMPD documentation and lacked a lawful basis, characterizing it as criminal rather than a legitimate law-enforcement action. He also indicated that acting deputy EMPD chief, Julius Mkhwanazi was also at the scene.

The material provided by Hanekom was later submitted to the Independent Police Investigative Directorate (IPID) for investigation.

== Death ==
Hanekom was shot dead on 17 March 2023 in what was initially reported as a hijacking and drive-by shooting. During Madlanga Commission hearings, Spies raised concerns about the timing and circumstances of the killing, noting that it occurred shortly after officers implicated in the Meyerton matter were granted bail. Testimony before the commission questioned whether Hanekom's killing was linked to his role as a whistleblower, highlighting the risks faced by informants exposing alleged corruption within law enforcement agencies.

== See also ==
- Julius Mkhwanazi
- Madlanga Commission
- Marius van der Merwe
- Wiandre Pretorius
