= Action Society =

Non-profit organisation based in Cape Town, South Africa

- Type: Non-profit organisation
- Purpose: Civil rights, Community safety, Crime prevention
- Location: Cape Town, South Africa
- Region served: South Africa
- Method: Advocacy, Community engagement, Public awareness campaigns
- Key people: Ian Cameron (Former Community Safety Director)

Action Society is a non-profit organisation based in Cape Town, South Africa, focused on civil rights, community safety, and crime prevention. The organization engages with communities and advocates for victims of crime, specifically those affected by gender-based violence and sexual offences.

== Background ==
Action Society has been engaged in addressing issues related to public safety and has had confrontations with Police Minister Bheki Cele concerning community safety events and policies.

The organization attracts attention due to its vocal stance against perceived inadequate policies and resources allocated to fight crime in South Africa.

== Projects ==
Action Society works to bring attention to social ills that continue to impact South African communities. The organization has particularly highlighted issues related to the handling of DNA backlogs by police and has criticized the reporting of backlog numbers as misleading.

The organization has also engaged in efforts to challenge what they deem to be inadequate deployment of police resources in crime-afflicted areas and has been involved in discussions about the devolution of policing power to local levels in the Western Cape.

=== Submissions ===
Action Society is actively involved in the legislative process and regularly participates in public participation processes to submit comments and insights on proposed legislation. The organization has proactively engaged in discussions and provided inputs on several amendment bills including:

- The Criminal and Related Matters Amendment Bill,
- Domestic Violence Amendment Bill,
- Criminal Law (Sexual Offences and Related Matters) Amendment Bill,
- Criminal Law (Forensic Procedures) Amendment Bill [B25-2021, and
- Independent Police Investigative Directorate Amendment Bill [B21-2023].

The organization's focus during these advocacy initiatives is often oriented towards enhancing the justice system and applying pressure on the government to enact reforms, particularly in areas relating to gender-based violence.

=== Community Safety Initiatives ===
In October 2024, Action Society, in partnership with the Embassy of the Czech Republic, launched the Lentegeur Neighbourhood Watch Container Project in Mitchells Plain, Cape Town. The initiative provided a 12 m^{3} container equipped with solar power, radios, and clothing to support the Lentegeur Community Watch. This facility replaced a smaller wooden shed and serves as a base for approximately 60 community members who patrol the area and escort children to school. The project aims to enhance safety in a neighborhood affected by gang-related violence.

== Impact ==
The organization has experienced increased interest and support following its interactions with Minister Bheki Cele. Action Society has played a role in sustaining momentum around addressing crime and has been involved in the oversight of investigations and prosecutions. The organization also actively participates in addressing cases of gender-based violence, seeking to assist in various capacities to bring justice to victims.
