= Katiso Molefe =

Businessman and alleged underworld kingpin (born 1975)

- Born: Katiso Molefe; March 15, 1975 (age 51); Johannesburg, South Africa
- Other name: KT Molefe
- Education: University of Johannesburg (BA Economics); University of Limpopo (MA Development Studies)
- Occupation: Businessman
- Known for: Alleged underworld figure; accused mastermind in the murder of DJ Sumbody
- Criminal charges: Murder, conspiracy, organised crime

Katiso "KT" Molefe (born March 15, 1975) is a South African businessman and suspected underworld kingpin. He is accused of being a mastermind behind the killing of Oupa Sefoka (famously known as DJ Sumbody) and a few other notable individuals.

He was detained at Kgosi Mampuru II Correctional Centre, where faced with charges linked to high-profile crimes after being denied bail in August 2025. He appealed the bail judgement and was released on a R400 000 bail on 10 October 2025.

== Early life and education ==
Molefe was born in Johannesburg, South Africa. In 1996, Molefe enrolled at the University of Johannesburg, earning a bachelor's degree in economics by the year 2000. His studies focused on understanding markets and development, aligning with South Africa's growing economy. He went on to pursue a Master's in Development Studies at the University of Limpopo from 2012 to 2013.

== Career and business ==
Molefe was a Provincial Manager at the National Lottery Board and this is where he managed to build a reputation in Gauteng's business circles, having interests in hospitality and real estate. He also worked at the Department of Trade and Industry and later, he joined the National Research Foundation.

== Controversies ==
Molefe was arrested along with four hitmen, namely Michael Pule Tau, Tiego Floyd Mabusela and Musa Kekana, in August 2025 by the police's political killings task team in Gauteng. He is facing multiple charges, including murder, conspiracy to commit murder, and possession of unlicensed firearms and ammunition. Molefe is allegedly involved in the illicit drug trade and the killings of DJ Sumbody, real name Oupa John Sefoka and DJ Vintos, real name Hector Buthelezi. DJ Sumbody was gunned down in a hail of bullets in Woodmead, in Johannesburg, in November 2022. His two bodyguards, Sibusiso Mokoena and Sandile Myeza, were also killed in the shooting. Molefe has also been charged with the murder of Vereeniging engineer Armand Swart, who was shot and killed outside his workplace on April 17, 2024, in a case of mistaken identity. Swart, who worked at Q Tech Engineering Company based in Vereeniging was shot and killed when the hitmen mistook him for another employee who is a whistleblower in a Transnet scandal. Police linked a gun, an AK-47 used in all murders, to Molefe and his co-accused. The gun is also the same gun that was used in a failed hit to kill actress Tebogo Thobejane, who is linked to Vusimusi Matlala. The AK-47 was also used in the killing of a businessman named Don Tindleni in March 2023 on the N1 near the M17 off-ramp, Johannesburg, while he was in his BMW 5 Series.

In August 2023 Molefe was irregularly awarded a tender by the Matjhabeng Local Municipality for the Welkom Cargo Airport, in Welkom, Free State. This allegedly happened two days after registering his company that later won the bid.

In 2004 Molefe was convicted by a court in the UK for possession of the cannabis drug. On 29 September 2025, Crime Intelligence boss Dumisani Khumalo provided further information during the Madlanga Commission into a sophisticated organised criminal syndicate called the “Big Five” which Molefe is part of. He mentioned the cartel, which is based in Gauteng, is allegedly involved in various sectors of organized crime, including drug trafficking, hijackings, tender fraud, and contract killings. In October 2025, the Johannesburg High Court granted Molefe bail of R400,000, overturning an earlier decision by the Alexandra Magistrates’ Court that denied his release.

== Madlanga commision ==
On 18 August 2026, it was heard at the Madlanga commission how Molefe, Steve Motsumi, Jonathan Msibi and Sergeant Fannie Nkosi wanted to buy and sell law enforcement surveillance technology to King Mswati of the eSwatini Kingdom. WhatsApp messages revealed that these men were acting as South African representatives, especially of the South African Police Services, while trying to buy these devices from a company in Czech Republic. It was Fannie Nkosi who fraudulently used the South African Police stamps on all the documents.
