= DJ Sumbody =

South African music artist (1984-2022)

- Born: Oupa John Sefoka; June 9, 1984; Pretoria, South Africa
- Origin: South Africa
- Died: November 20, 2022 (aged 38) Johannesburg, South Africa
- Genres: Amapiano, House, Kwaito
- Occupations: DJ; record producer; entrepreneur
- Years active: 2009–2022
- Label: Sumsounds Music

Oupa John Sefoka (popularly known as DJ Sumbody; 10 June 1984 - 20 November 2022) was a South African deejay, record producer and entrepreneur. Until his murder on 20 November 2022 in Johannesburg, DJ Sumbody was South Africa's prominent figure in the Amapiano music genre and co-founded the popular Ayepyep lifestyle lounge brand.

He was known for his unique blend of house music, amapiano, and kwaito beats, as well as his energetic performances. His notable hit was Monate Mpolaye featuring Cassper Nyovest.

== Early life ==
Sefoka was born on 10 June 1984 in Pretoria, Gauteng province of South Africa. He attended Sunnyside Primary School and did his matric at Bokgoni Technical High School before studying at Tshwane University of Technology. In his second year, Sefoka dropped out to pursue a music career. About this time, Sefoka also worked in the taxi industry as a queue marshal, then drove his father’s taxis part-time.

== Music career ==
DJ Sumbody started his career debut as a volunteer producer and presenter on Mashaedi on the Engage, which was a popular youth community radio in Tshwane. In 2018, he released the single Monate Mpolaye featuring Cassper Nyovest which garnered him many followers. He also released the music his debut album,Larger Than House. On 6 December 2019, Sefoka followed up with another album Ashi Nthwela, featuring stars such as Londie London, Zakes Bantwini, Busiswa, Cassper Nyovest, DJ Tira, Zakes, Kwesta and Holly Rey.

Besides music, Dj Sumbody was a businessman and owned a few clubs in Tshwane and one in Cape Town called Ayepyep Lifestyle. He also had his own clothing label.

== Death ==
Dj Sumbody was killed in a hail of bullets at the corner of Woodland Drive in Sandton, Johannesburg, in November 2022 with his bodyguard, Sibusiso Mokoena and his manager Sandile Shawn Myeza. On 21 July 2025 four men; Micheal Pule Tau, Tiego Floyd Mabusela, Musa Kekana and Sandton businessman Katiso Molefe, who is believed to have ordered a hit on DJ Sumbody—were arrested. This came after Kwazulu-Natal Police General Nhlanhla Mkhwananzi alleged that there is a police syndicate involved and that guns stolen from police safes are the ones linked to the killing of musicians as well as well-known people in Gauteng. Police investigations revealed that the gun that was used to kill DJ Sumbody is the same weapon that was used in the murder of an engineer, Armand Swart at his workplace in Vereeniging in 2023. It is also the same gun used in an attempted murder of television actress and influencer Tebogo Thobejane. DJ Sumbody faced tensions related to his business ventures, including clashes with suspected gang members. Police investigations revealed that DJ Somebody's death was linked to a violent underworld feud over a multi-million-rand drug consignment that went missing in police custody in KwaZulu-Natal. Police have confirmed that the same AK-47 gun used in the killing of DJ Sumbody was used to kill DJ Vintos who was gunned down in March 2022 outside a nightclub in Orlando East, Soweto. The gun was also linked to the killing in March 2023 of a man identified as Don Tindleni on the N1 near the N17 offramp. Dj Sumbody survived an earlier assassination attempt in 2021.
