= Ian Cameron (activist) =

South African civic activist and politician

- Born: Kempton Park, South Africa
- Education: Police Science, UNISA; Certificate in Local Government, University of Pretoria
- Occupations: Director of Community Safety, Activist
- Employer: Action Society (former)
- Known for: Advocacy for victims of violent crime, criticism of police minister Bheki Cele

Ian Cameron is a South African politician from the Democratic Alliance who was elected to the Parliament of South Africa in the 2024 South African general election. He is also a civic activist and the former Director of Community Safety at Action Society, a non-profit organization focused on assisting victims of violent or hate crimes who cannot afford legal counsel. Action Society was officially opened in 2021, primarily focusing on working for reform in the justice system, especially regarding gender-based violence.

== Early life and education ==
Cameron was born in Kempton Park and moved to the UK with his family when he was six. He studied Police Science at UNISA and has completed courses at the North-West University, the New York Fire Department, the Montana Department of Forestry, and earned a certificate in Local Government through the University of Pretoria.

== Career ==
Prior to his role at Action Society, Cameron worked for AfriForum for 10 years, focusing on supporting victims of farm attacks. The organization advocates for less dependency on the government in combating crime.

In 2023 Cameron criticised police minister Bheki Cele. He gained attention after an incident where he was removed from a community policing engagement meeting by Cele in Gugulethu.

In the same month, Cameron and Action Society were part of public participation processes regarding proposed legislation. The organization has submitted comments on various amendment bills, including the Gender-Based Violence Amendment Bills, the Criminal Law (Forensic Procedures) Amendment Bill, and the Independent Police Investigative Directorate Amendment Bill.

In October 2023 Cameron was alleged to have made defamatory comments against several black professionals, including Professor Mamokgethi Phakeng. Cameron accused them of corruption in response to a speaking engagement event poster shared on social media. Cameron subsequently apologized, clarifying that he was unaware of Professor Phakeng's specific inclusion in the poster and that his comments were directed at other individuals on the poster with a history of alleged corrupt activities.

Parliamentary Career

Following the 2024 general elections in South Africa, Cameron was elected a member of parliament for the Democratic Alliance. A 12-year-old video of Cameron wearing blackface resurfaced, sparking public outrage on social media.

On 10 July 2024, Cameron was appointed chairperson of the Portfolio Committee on Police.

== Move to the Democratic Alliance ==
In March 2024, Ian Cameron transitioned from his role at Action Society to join the Democratic Alliance (DA) the with intentions of potentially securing a parliamentary seat. Cameron's move garnered attention within political circles and was reported in various media outlets, including the Cape Argus and IOL News.

== Personal life ==
Cameron is married and is a father. He supports efforts aimed at reducing the rate of violent rapes and murders, especially against children, in South Africa.
