= Bheki Cele =

South African minister of police

The Honourable Bheki Cele
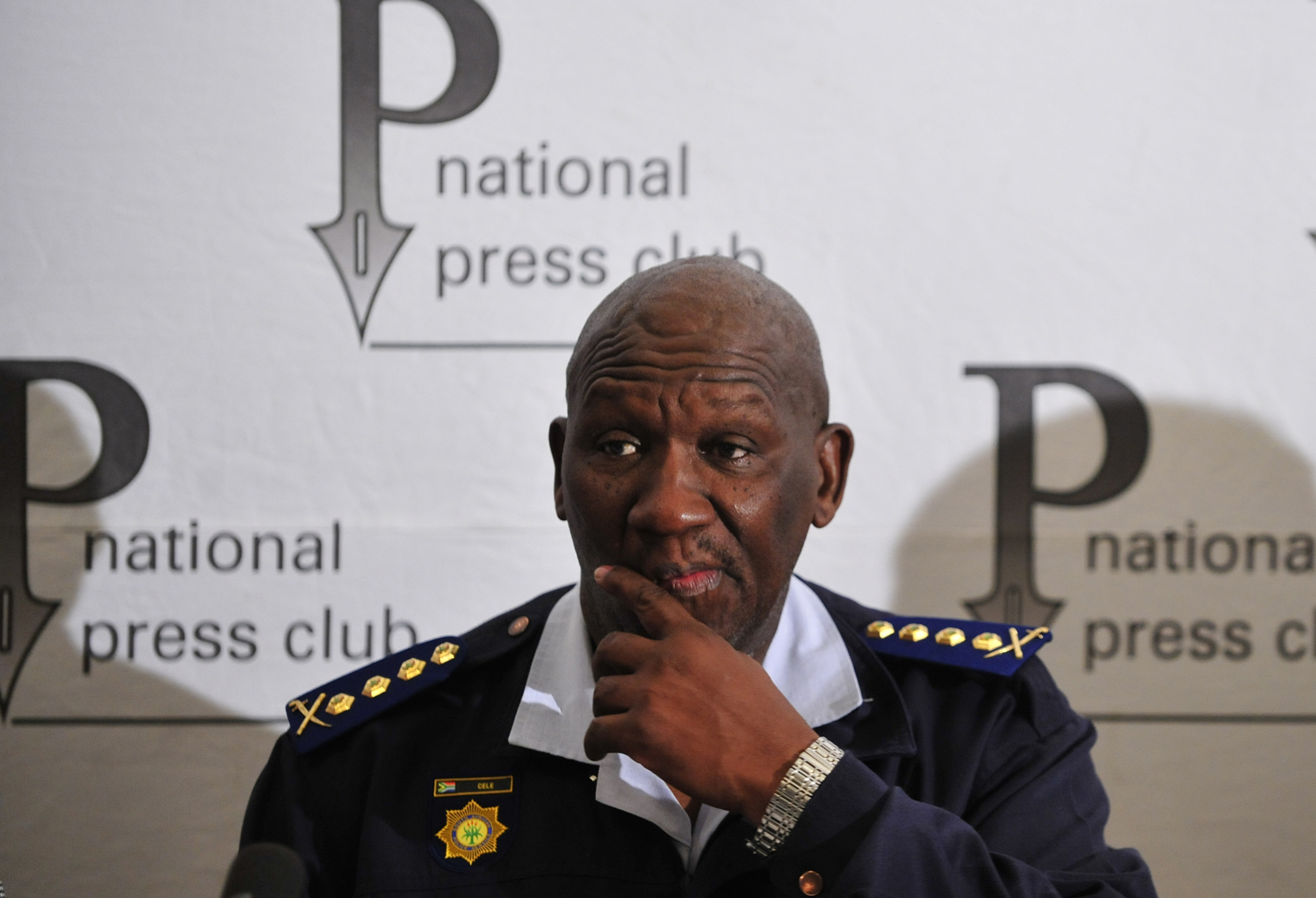
- Cele at a press conference in June 2010

Minister of Police
- In office 26 February 2018 – 17 June 2024
- President: Cyril Ramaphosa
- Preceded by: Fikile Mbalula
- Succeeded by: Senzo Mchunu

Deputy Minister of Agriculture, Forestry and Fisheries
- In office 26 May 2014 – 24 February 2018
- President: Jacob Zuma; Cyril Ramaphosa
- Minister: Senzeni Zokwana
- Preceded by: Pieter Mulder

National Commissioner of the South African Police Service
- In office July 2009 – October 2011
- President: Jacob Zuma
- Minister: Nathi Mthethwa
- Preceded by: Jackie Selebi
- Succeeded by: Riah Phiyega

Deputy Provincial Secretary of the African National Congress in KwaZulu-Natal
- In office 1996–1998
- Provincial Chairperson: Jacob Zuma
- Provincial Secretary: Sipho Gcabashe
- Preceded by: Sifiso Nkabinde
- Succeeded by: Senzo Mchunu

Personal details
- Born: Bhekokwakhe Hamilton Cele; 22 April 1952 (age 74) Umzumbe, Natal, Union of South Africa
- Party: African National Congress
- Spouses: Thando Ngcobo (divorced) Thembeka Ngcobo (m. 2010)
- Occupation: Politician; legislator; police officer; military veteran; anti-apartheid activist
- Profession: Teacher

Military service
- Allegiance: Union of South Africa
- Branch/service: Umkhonto We Sizwe
- Years of service: 1984 – 1994
- Unit: Underground unit
- Commands: South African National Defence Force
- Police career
- Department: South African Police Service; Department of Police (South Africa)
- Service years: 2009 – 2011
- Rank: General; Commissioner

Bhekokwakhe "Bheki" Hamilton Cele (born 22 April 1952) is the former South African Minister of Police from February 2018 to 17 June 2024. He was National Commissioner of the South African Police Service for two years, until misconduct allegations led to his suspension in October 2011 and removal in June 2012. He has also served as Deputy Minister of Agriculture, Forestry and Fisheries, on the KwaZulu-Natal Executive Council, and in the KwaZulu-Natal Provincial Legislature. He is a member of the National Executive Committee of the African National Congress, and was imprisoned on Robben Island during apartheid.

== Life and career ==
Cele was born on 22 April 1952 in Umzumbe, Natal (now KwaZulu-Natal). He holds a teacher's diploma, and in 1980 became a founding member of the progressive, non-racial National Education Union of South Africa. In exile in Angola in the mid-1980s, he joined Umkhonto we Sizwe, and he was imprisoned on Robben Island from 1987 until he was released, along with other political prisoners, in 1990.

=== 1994-2009: KwaZulu-Natal government ===
In the 1994 elections, Cele was elected to the KwaZulu-Natal Provincial Legislature. During his time in the legislature, he served as Chairperson of the Portfolio Committee on Safety and Security and later as the chairperson of chairpersons. From 2004, he was member of the Executive Council (MEC) for Transport, Community Safety and Liaison in KwaZulu-Natal.

=== 2009-present: National government ===
In July 2009, he was appointed National Commissioner of the South African Police Service (SAPS). He was fired in June 2012, following allegations that he had been involved in unlawful property deals. Thereafter, he was Deputy Minister of Agriculture, Forestry and Fisheries from May 2014 until late February 2018, when President Cyril Ramaphosa appointed him Minister of Police in his first cabinet reshuffle. Reaction to Cele's appointment was mixed. He was reappointed as police minister following the 2019 general election. Cele lost his seat in the National Assembly at the 2024 general election.

=== ANC membership ===
Cele remains a member of the African National Congress (ANC), and currently serves in its chief executive organ, the National Executive Committee. For a period in the mid-1990s, he was safety and security spokesman for the party's KwaZulu-Natal branch, and in the 2000s he served as party chairman in the eThekwini region. In the 2000s, Cele was characterised as an ally of Jacob Zuma. However, during the hotly contested ANC leadership elections of 2017, he aligned himself with Cyril Ramaphosa and against Nkosazana Dlamini-Zuma.

== Controversies ==
=== "Shoot-to-kill" remarks and use of deadly force ===
In July 2007, The Sowetan reported that Cele, then MEC for safety in KwaZulu-Natal, had told a meeting in Durban that police should "shoot to kill" when confronting criminals, as well as making other remarks endorsing the use of deadly force. Although Cele denied that he used the words "shoot to kill," he admitted to having made other similar remarks, including, "We cannot allow police to be killed by criminals. Once criminals pull their guns, police must aim for the head." In 2010, Cele sued the Sowetan for defamation, and R200 000 in damages, on the basis of two of its 2007 reports on the saga, including one published alongside a digitally altered photograph of Cele holding a gun. The case was dismissed. A reporter from the Sowetan testified that he was personally present at the meeting in Durban and had heard Cele utter the remarks; and the court pointed out that the only other newspaper to send a reporter to the meeting, the Citizen, had also reported that Cele had called for police to shoot to kill.

In August 2009, shortly after taking office as National Commissioner of SAPS, Cele caused a national controversy when he allegedly repeated the "shoot to kill" remarks to the Weekend Argus. Speaking about a proposed amendment to Section 49 of the Criminal Procedure Act, which outlines grounds for the justifiable use of deadly force, Cele reportedly said that police should be able to "shoot to kill" criminals without worrying about "what happens after that." Speaking to the Los Angeles Times, Cele denied that he had said the police should shoot to kill – instead, his point had been that it was dangerous for police officers to be unsure about whether they were permitted to use deadly force in a confrontation with an armed criminal. Elsewhere he clarified that police should not shoot innocent people, but should "decisively defend themselves" against armed and dangerous criminals. Asked about his remarks in 2018, after his appointment as Minister of Police, he again denied that he had used the phrase "shoot to kill," but said, "I’ve said that... when [police] deal with the tough brutal criminals, they must not die with their guns in their hands and I still say so." Since then, he has on several occasions reminded SAPS officers that they should use deadly force when necessary.

=== Conflict with Inkatha Freedom Party ===
In January 2009, in the run-up to the elections, Cele was present at a stand-off between ANC supporters and Inkatha Freedom Party (IFP) supporters at an ANC rally in Nongoma, KwaZulu-Natal. The IFP accused Cele of provoking police to "brutalize" IFP supporters. Cele claimed that these claims were defamatory and, in February, filed a court application to interdict their publication. The application was dismissed.

=== Roux Property Fund property deals ===
In early 2011, when Cele was National Commissioner of SAPS, the Public Protector, Thuli Madonsela, found that the government had leased office buildings in Pretoria and Durban – intended to serve as police headquarters – at vastly inflated rates. The leases were worth more than R1.5 billion and were signed with Roux Property Fund. Madonsela said that the deals were "unlawful" and "illegitimate," and she held Cele – along with the Minister of Public Works, Gwen Mahlangu-Nkabinde – responsible. She deemed his conduct "improper, unlawful and amounting to maladministration." Although he had not signed the lease for the Pretoria building personally, he had signed a memorandum authorising funding for the lease. Cele denied any wrongdoing.

In October 2011, the then President Jacob Zuma suspended Cele with pay, pending the outcome of an inquiry, chaired by former judge Jake Moloi, into his possible misconduct. One of the questions pursued by the board of inquiry was the extent of Cele's relationship with Roux Shabangu of the Roux Property Fund – that is, whether Cele's conduct had been not only unlawful but also corrupt, as some have suggested. The board of inquiry found that Cele had been dishonest and was unfit for office, and recommended his dismissal. On 12 June 2012, Zuma announced that he had fired Cele on the basis of these findings. Nearly seven years later, however, in April 2019, the Pretoria High Court set aside the inquiry's report, following a protracted legal struggle by Cele to clear his name.

=== Whistleblower protection ===
In 2018 the Public Protector, Busisiwe Mkhwebane, claimed that Cele and SAPS had failed to provide personal protection to two whistleblowers who had reported corruption in the Umzimkulu municipality in KwaZulu-Natal. However, Cele took the report under judicial review, and in 2020 the Gauteng North High Court declared it invalid, clearing Cele of all wrongdoing. The court said that, as set out in legislation, it is not the responsibility of the police to ensure that witnesses and whistleblowers receive personal protection.

=== COVID-19 pandemic ===
During the 2020 COVID-19 pandemic, Cele's leadership of the police was criticised, with Cele accused of "excessive policing" of compliance with lockdown regulations.

=== Gun control ===
Cele supports strict gun control, and has said that he does not think that private citizens should be permitted to own firearms. A piece of gun control legislation introduced under his police ministry in 2021, the Firearms Control Amendment Bill, has encountered opposition from some civil society groups. Under the proposed law, self-defence would not be considered a valid reason for seeking a firearm license. Cele has defended the Bill on the grounds that most murders in South Africa are committed with firearms.

=== Incident with Ian Cameron ===
In an event in Gugulethu, Police Minister Bheki Cele had a confrontation with Ian Cameron, director of community safety for Action Society, a non-profit organisation focusing on violent crime. The incident occurred during a community policing engagement where Cameron made comments regarding the community having to do the work of the police, which appeared to agitate Cele. Cele responded with remarks about his experiences during apartheid and shouted "shut up" at Cameron before officials removed Cameron from the premises. Cameron later expressed that his issue was not with Cele personally but with the position he occupied and his handling of crime-related matters. This incident highlighted tensions and differing perspectives on community safety, police efficacy, and responsibility in addressing crime.

== Police corruption scandal ==
In July 2025, Cele was implicated in the police corruption scandal involving Vusumuzi Matlala who is currently in prison. Reports allege that while he was the minister of police, Cele stayed in a luxury penthouse suite owned by Matlala just days before Matlala’s company was awarded a R360 million SAPS health services tender.

Bheki Cele's name was added to the seven top names that are going to testify to parliament ad hoc against Mkhwanazi's allegations. Cele began making providing testimony before parliament’s ad hoc committee on 23 October 2025. Matlala claimed that he gave Cele R500 000.

Preceded by Jackie Selebi	National Commissioner of the South African Police Service	Succeeded by Riah Phiyega
