= Ekurhuleni Metropolitan Police Department =

Police department in Gauteng, South Africa

Ekurhuleni Metropolitan Municipality Police Department is a metropolitan law agency in South Africa that was established in February 2002. It is responsible for crime prevention, traffic law enforcement, bylaw enforcement, and licensing services in the City of Ekurhuleni, which includes the East Rand region of Gauteng province.

== History ==
The Ekurhuleni metropolitan municipality was established in 2000 as a result of a merger between the Eastern Gauteng Services Council, the Khayalami Metropolitan Council, and the previous municipalities of Alberton, Benoni, Boksburg, Brakpan, Edenvale/Lethabong, Germiston, Kempton Park/Tembisa, Nigel and Springs.

== Divisions ==
The Ekurhuleni Metropolitan Municipality Police Department is divided into five primary operational divisions, alongside internal administration and regional commands, to manage crime prevention, traffic policing, and by-law enforcement across the City of Ekurhuleni.

=== Operations and specialized ===
This division improves safety and security to plan and execute crime prevention through operations and joint operations with other law enforcement agencies.

=== Compliance ===
Monitors violations and attends to complaints relating to street trading, vagrancy, signage and advertising, dumping, land invasion, and waste.

=== Auxiliary ===
Improves safety and security to plan and execute crime prevention through operations and joint operations with other law enforcement agencies.

=== The Fine Administration ===
The Fine Administration section is responsible for processing notices (Sect 56 and 341 notices) and the adjudication of camera 341 notices that are issued in terms of the Criminal Procedure Act, 1977 [Act No. 51 of 1977].

=== Accident bureaus ===
Accident bureaus are responsible for responding to accident scenes in the metro.

== Ekurhuleni Metropolitan Police Department crimes and corruption ==
On 11 November 2025, acting Ekurhuleni Metropolitan Police Department head Julius Mkhwanazi was suspended following allegations at the Madlanga Commission. Witnesses from the EMPD testified and gave evidence that linked Mkhwanazi to a murder case and accused him of running a rogue unit allegedly involved in extortion, kidnapping, theft, and truck hijackings in and around Gauteng. Mkhwanazi was also mentioned to have played a major part in having Vusimuzi Matlala, a controversial businessman who is currently behind bars, sign an agreement between the EMPD and Matlala's security company, which did not follow the correct protocols. Matlala paid Mkhwanazi for these favors. Mkhwananzi was also implicated for authorizing the fitting of blue lights on vehicles linked to Medicare24 CEO Mike van Wyk.

Another allegation against Mkhwanazi is being an accessory to a murder that happened on 15 April 2022 in the Brakpan area. It is alleged that the victim, a Mozambican national, Emmanuel Mbhese, was tortured on the scene by the Ekurhuleni Metropolitan Police Department members, and his body was dumped in a dam on Mkhwananzi's instruction.

During the commission hearings, a video was shown of Mkhwananzi and the rogue unit raiding a factory in Meyerton, outside their operation boundaries. Mkhwanazi and Ekurhuleni Metropolitan Police Department officers stole copper at a workshop in August 2022. Jaco Hanekom, a supervisor and whistleblower who exposed the EMPD operation at the said workshop, was later killed in March 2023 after the EMPD officers who were arrested were granted bail. EMPD's specialized services unit, under Mkhwanazi's command, was also linked to the theft of a truck and its load in Putfontein, Benoni, and the kidnapping of the driver in March 2023.

It was also revealed at the Madlanga commission by Mkhwanazi's ex-girlfriend, who is an officer at the Johannesburg Metropolitan Police Department, that Mkhwanazi and his rogue unit were involved in the Precious Stones case, which occurred in the Hillbrow-Kensington area in 2024, where police are accused of stealing precious stones worth R45-million.

Mkhwanazi has since been placed on suspension as of November 2025.

== Arrests ==
On 8 July 2026, suspended EMPD acting chief commissioner Julius Mkhwanazi, suspended Ekurhuleni legal risk services head Kemi Behari, former Ekurhuleni city manager Imogen Mashazi, and Ekurhuleni head of human resources Linda Gxasheka were arrested. The four appeared at the Germiston magistrate court the following day for their alleged fraud and corruption activities revealed at the Madlanga Commission.
