= Julius Mkhwanazi =

South African law enforcement officer

Julius Doctor Mkhwanazi (born 5 February 1973) was a South African law enforcement official who served as Deputy Chief of the Ekurhuleni Metropolitan Police Department (EMPD). He came to national attention in November 2025 when he was suspended by the City of Ekurhuleni following allegations of corruption, abuse of power, and irregular promotions within the department. He was fired in September 2026.

== Early life ==
Julius Mkhwanazi was born on 5 February 1973, in KwaZulu-Natal, South Africa.

== Career ==
Mkhwanazi rose through the ranks of the Ekurhuleni Metropolitan Police Department and became its Deputy Chief. According to testimony presented at the Madlanga Commission of Inquiry, he at times acted as Chief of the Community Safety Department, which oversees the EMPD.

=== Madlanga Commission ===
In 2025, Mkhwanazi was implicated in a series of allegations presented before the Madlanga Commission of Inquiry, a judicial probe into corruption in law enforcement structures. Former deputy chief Revo Spies testified that Mkhwanazi authorized more than 50 promotions within the EMPD over a three-month period without proper vetting or administrative procedure.

=== Links to alleged criminal elements ===
Reports by Eyewitness News and other outlets alleged that Mkhwanazi authorised the installation of blue lights on vehicles belonging to Vusimuzi Matlala, an individual alleged to have criminal associations with the Big 5 cartel.

=== Forged agreements and abuse of authority ===
According to reporting by The Star, officials alleged that Mkhwanazi's department may have made use of forged memorandum of understanding (MOUs) that created unofficial working relationships between the EMPD and companies linked to that of Vusimuzi Matlala.

=== Crime scene tampering and theft ===
The Madlanga Commission also heard testimony from Rovos Spies that Mkhwanazi had interfered with crime scenes. During the commission hearings, a video was shown of Mkhwanazi and the rogue unit raiding a factory in Meyerton, outside their operation boundaries. Mkhwanazi and the rogue EMPD officers stole copper at a workshop in August 2022. Jaco Hanekom a police informant who exposed the EMPD operation at the said workshop, was later killed in March 2023 after the EMPD officers who were arrested were granted bail. Testimony also revealed that Mkhwanazi allegedly refused to undergo formal vetting by the State Security Agency, despite a 2022 screening that reportedly identified hundreds of officers with criminal records within the EMPD. Another allegation leveled against Mkhwanazi is being an accessory to a murder that happened on 15 April 2022 in the Brakpan area. It is alleged that the victim, Emmanuel Mbense, was tortured on the scene and the body was dumped in a dam on Mkhwanazi's instruction. This testimony was supplied by Marius van der Merwe during Madlanga Commission. He was assassinated on 5 December 2025, three weeks after giving evidence.

EMPD's specialized services unit, under Mkhwanazi's command, is also linked to the theft of a truck and its load in Putfontein, Benoni, and the kidnapping of the driver, in March 2023.

It is also alleged that Mkhwananzi and his rogue unit were involved in the Precious Stones case, which occurred in the Hillbrow-Killarney area in 2023, where police are accused of stealing precious stones worth R45-million. The stones were taken from the home of Peter Prinsloo on 11 February 2023, but only few of the stones, worth R40 000, were later recovered.

On Tuesday, 23 June 2026, a Johannesburg Metropolitan Police Department (JMPD) officer who was involved in a romantic relationship with Mkhwanazi testified under a hidden camera to the Madlanga Commission. Given the name Witness K, the officer told the commission how Mkhwanazi and three other officers under his command stole stones from an apartment in Killarney under the guise of a police operation in 2023.

== Suspension ==
On 11 November 2025, the City of Ekurhuleni announced that it had suspended Mkhwanazi pending disciplinary action and further investigation. The city manager emphasized that the suspension was an administrative measure and did not constitute a finding of guilt.

The allegations and subsequent suspension have drawn national attention to issues of corruption, inadequate oversight, and alleged criminal infiltration within South African municipal police departments.

=== Arrests ===
On 18 April 2026, Julius Mkhwanazi was arrested following his testimony at the Madlanga Commission of Inquiry in previous days. He faces charges of fraud, corruption, and defeating the ends of justice. 20 April 2026, Mkhwananzi was granted bail of R30 000 by the Boksburg Magistrates Court.

On 08 July 2026, Mkhwanazi was arrested again, this time alongside suspended Ekurhuleni legal risk services head Kemi Behari, former Ekurhuleni city manager Imogen Mashazi, and Ekurhuleni head of human resources Linda Gxasheka. The four appeared at the Germiston Magistrate Court the following day for their alleged fraud and corruption activities revealed at the Madlanga Commission.

=== Emmanuel Mbense murder ===
On 05 August 2026 Mkhwanazi was arrested with businessman Cobus Janse van Rensburg, a former EMPD official Adrian Norman Mackenzie, and former SAPS officers Bhekokwakhe Sibande, a well as Keisha-Leigh Stols for the murder of Emmanuel Mbense who was killed in 2022 and his body dumped in a dam in Brakpan.

== Personal life ==
Julius Mkhwanazi is married to Esethu Mkhwanazi and they have three children.

== See also ==
- Madlanga Commission
- Vusimuzi Matlala
- Marius van der Merwe
- Nhlanhla Mkhwanazi
- Jaco Hanekom
- Big Five cartel
