= Madlanga Commission =

2025 South African government corruption investigation, announced July 2025

Judicial Commission of Inquiry into Criminality, Political Interference, and Corruption in the Criminal Justice System
- Location: Pretoria, South Africa
- Also known as: Madlanga Commission
- Participants: Justice Mbuyiseli Madlanga (chairperson); Advocate Sesi Baloyi SC (assistant); Advocate Sandile Khumalo SC (assistant); Advocate Matthew Chakalson SC (evidence leader); Advocate Mahlape Sello SC (evidence leader); Advocate Adila Hassim SC(evidence leader); Advocate Lee Segeels-Ncube (evidence leader); Advocate Ofentse Motlhasedi (evidence leader); Advocate Thabang Pooe (evidence leader); Advocate Terry Motau SC (evidence leader; stepped down in September 2025)
- Website: criminaljusticecommission.org.za

The Judicial Commission of Inquiry into Criminality, Political Interference, and Corruption in the Criminal Justice System, better known as the Madlanga Commission, is a public inquiry announced in July 2025 by President Cyril Ramaphosa and headed by retired judge Mbuyiseli Madlanga to investigate allegations made by KwaZulu-Natal Provincial Police Commissioner Lieutenant General Nhlanhla Mkhwanazi of collusion and corruption between politicians, senior police, prosecutors, intelligence operatives and elements of the judiciary, in South Africa.

The commission is chaired by retired Constitutional Court Justice Mbuyiseli Madlanga and was supposed to conclude its work on 31 July 2026 with the report being handed in on 31 August 2026. In July 2026, President Ramaphosa extended the deadline for the commission until 16 November 2026. Hearings commenced on 17 September 2025 with Lieutenant General Nhlanhla Mkhwanazi's testimony, where he explained his allegations in full and presented evidence he had, in the form of documents, communications, and reports, among others, to establish the veracity of his allegations.

Following Mkwanazi, it was the National Commissioner of the South African Police Service, General Fannie Masemola who gave evidence at the Madlanga Commission on 22 September 2025 in Pretoria.

On 29 September 2025, Crime Intelligence boss Dumisani Khumalo provided further information into a sophisticated organised criminal syndicate, labelled the "Big Five". He mentioned the Cartel, which is based in Gauteng, is allegedly involved in various sectors of organised crime, including drug trafficking, hijackings, tender fraud, and contract killings.

== Background ==
On July 6, 2025, KwaZulu-Natal Police Commissioner Lieutenant General Nhlanhla Mkhwanazi held a press briefing at the SAPS Provincial Headquarters in Durban. During the briefing, he accused then–Minister of Police Senzo Mchunu of interfering in ongoing investigations. Mkhwanazi subsequently registered a criminal complaint against Mchunu, alleging political interference in the work of the South African Police Service's Political Killings Task Team, which had been established to investigate politically motivated murders.

== Proceedings and key evidential disclosures (September – October 2025) ==
The public hearings, which commenced in mid-September 2025, immediately began to reveal the contours of the alleged political interference and the infiltration of organised crime.

=== Evidence of political meddling ===
The initial phase of the hearings focused on the core allegations made by Lieutenant General Mkhwanazi. Mkhwanazi provided detailed evidence, outlining the political interference and questionable instructions he received from senior government officials regarding police operations.

Following Mkhwanazi, National Commissioner of the South African Police Service, General Fannie Masemola, gave evidence on 22 September 2025 in Pretoria. Masemola's testimony focused primarily on the operational and administrative decisions surrounding the alleged interference, including the executive decision to disband the KwaZulu-Natal Political Killings Task Team. Crucially, Masemola's submission largely corroborated Mkhwanazi's initial claims. This official validation from the head of the SAPS was a pivotal development, elevating Mkhwanazi's concerns from a political disagreement to an accepted fact among senior police leadership, thus solidifying the factual basis for the inquiry.

=== The infiltration of organised crime: Testimony on the "Big Five" cartel ===
The trajectory of the inquiry shifted significantly on 29 September 2025, when Crime Intelligence boss Lieutenant General Dumisani Khumalo took the stand. Khumalo's testimony provided detailed information on the infiltration of the state apparatus by sophisticated organised criminal entities.

Khumalo introduced evidence concerning a sophisticated syndicate labeled the "Big Five," also referred to as the "Cartel," which operates primarily out of Gauteng. The alleged activities of this syndicate are wide-ranging, covering major sectors of organised crime, including drug trafficking, hijackings, tender fraud, and contract killings. Furthermore, Khumalo revealed specific financial and communication details, including WhatsApp messages that provided evidence of illicit transactions, notably details of payments made by Vusimuzi 'Cat' Matlala to Brown Mogotsi.

This evidential disclosure fundamentally redefined the commission's focus, confirming the need for the specific terms of reference addressing the "facilitation of organised crime". The revelations confirmed that the state's systemic failure was not limited to political corruption but involved state capture by violent criminal networks, directly impacting public safety and economic integrity.

=== Testimony behind closed doors ===
The commission's evidence leaders argue that closed sessions (closed to the public and media) are necessary to protect the safety of key witnesses who will implicate a criminal cartel, as well as to safeguard sensitive investigative techniques. Daily Maverick and News24 have launched a legal challenge against the Madlanga Commission of Inquiry's application to hold a week of its hearings "in camera". The media houses oppose this, citing the constitutional principle of open justice and arguing that a compromise should allow decisions on closure to be made on a case-by-case basis.

=== Continuation of the commission ===
The recent focus of the Madlanga Commission centered on WhatsApp chats alleging corruption between alleged drug cartel member Vusimuzi "Cat" Matlala and senior government and police officials. Testimony from "Witness X" revealed a beneficial relationship between Matlala and KwaZulu-Natal Hawks head Major-General Lesetja Senona, alleging Senona shared confidential police information with Matlala and discussed him facilitating a property deal for his son. The chats further showed Matlala's influence, as he asked Ekurhuleni Metro Police Department Deputy Police Chief Julius Mkhwanazi to "assist" and "intervene" in a speeding arrest for Matlala's driver, which Mkhwanazi allegedly did. Due to concerns about safety and technical issues that arose during remote testimony, the commission adjusted its proceedings to include both in-camera (closed) and remote, off-camera testimony for sensitive witnesses and ongoing investigations.

== On 5 December 2025 Marius van der Merwe, the owner of a private security company and known by the commission as "Witness D", was shot outside of his home in Brakpan. Van der Merwe was with his wife and children when two men, allegedly driving a Nissan NP200 pickup approached the man and shot him with AK-47s. ==
Van der Merwe testified to the commission about Mkhwanazi's and Matlala's involvement in the coverup, torture and murder of a robbery suspect in 2022. The suspect had apparently had a plastic bag put over his head to suffocate him until he confessed to the robbery. When the suspect died, van der Merwe testified that he was instructed by Mkhwanazi to dispose of the body and when the body was found later in a reservoir in Nigel, police informant Jaco Hanekom told the witness that Mkhwanazi would cover up the situation.

President Ramaphosa released a statement on 6 December offering his condolences to van der Merwe's family and pledging to redouble efforts to protect whistleblowers and continue to fight corruption. Glynnis Breytenbach of the Democratic Alliance released a statement with a similar message. Justice Minister Mmamoloko Kubayi defended the government's witness protection program and the security provided to commission witnesses, placing blame on the South African media for discovering Witness D's identity.

After van der Merwe was killed, media sources began to place doubt on the continuation of the commission and speculated about the safety of other commission witnesses and other whistleblowers. While van der Merwe declined witness protection, several previous whistleblowers under government protection reported that they feared for their lives. Several commission witnesses reported receiving threats against their lives, with one potential witness afraid to testify due to possibly being next on the hit list.

=== Assassination of Jaco Hanekom ===
Jaco Hanekom, a police informant, was killed in March 2023 after witnessing an illegal copper raid by the Ekurhuleni Metropolitan Police Department (EMPD) in Meyerton, which was outside its operational area. In 2022, Hanekom obtained CCTV footage allegedly showing EMPD officers conducting an unauthorized operation at a workshop outside the municipality's lawful policing area. The footage was said to depict the seizure of copper cable under the guise of a police operation. Rovo Spies testified at the commission that the operation shown in the footage was not recorded in official EMPD documentation and lacked a lawful basis, characterizing it as criminal rather than a legitimate law-enforcement action. He also indicated that acting deputy EMPD Chief, Julius Mkhwanazi was also at the scene. Hanekom was killed a few days after the officers who were accused of the theft of the copper in Meyerton got bail.

=== Vusi Shongwe's testimony ===
In June 2026, a member of parliament and ad hoc committee, Vusi Shongwe, testified before the commission and claimed that he was offered R10 million during a Durban virtual meeting with suspended Gauteng Crime Intelligence head Major-General Feroz Khan. This was after his questioning of Khan’s alleged links to illegal cigarette smuggling at a parliamentary ad hoc committee on South African Police Services. Shongwe also detailed the Aeroton drug bust as well as claims of cover-ups related to the deaths of make-up artist Maja Janeska and Johannesburg anesthesiologist Dr. Abhulhay Munshi, who were killed in September 2020 and December 2022, respectively, and were linked to Khan. Shonwge also examined claims of cover-ups involving illicit cigarette smuggling, which Khan has been linked to, as two businessmen, Mohammadh Sayed and Adriano Mazzotti, were both associated with and were owners of the tobacco company called Carnilinx. Shongwe called this group an "Indian cabal" in the SAPS and said that it was running an underground network of influence and corruption within IDAC.

== Arrests ==
On 24 March 2026, 12 senior police officers were arrested in connection with the R360 million police tender awarded to Cat Matlala's Medicare 24. The officers have since appeared in the Pretoria magistrate court.

== See also ==
- Zondo Commission
