= Nhlanhla Mkhwanazi =

South African policeman (born 1973)

Lieutenant General Nhlanhla Mkhwanazi
- Born: Nhlanhla Sibusiso Mkhwanazi; 5 February 1973 (age 53); Edendale, Pietermaritzburg, KwaZulu-Natal, South Africa
- Education: National Diploma in South African Special Forces Operations; National Diploma in Police Administration; B-Tech Degree in Policing; BA Degree in Policing
- Alma mater: Technikon SA; University of South Africa; SAPS Special Task Force Academy
- Occupation: Law enforcement official
- Years active: 1993–present
- Employer: South African Police Service (SAPS)
- Known for: Leadership in SAPS, Special Task Force, acting National Police Commissioner
- Title: Provincial Police Commissioner, KwaZulu-Natal
- Spouse: Esethu Mkhwanazi (per some sources)
- Children: 2–4 (per conflicting sources)

Nhlanhla 'Lucky' Sibusiso Mkhwanazi (born 5 February 1973) is a South African law enforcement official who is serving the KwaZulu Natal Province of South Africa as the Provincial Police Commissioner. He is a Lieutenant-General by rank, reporting directly to the national police commissioner.

He is a former South African Police Service (SAPS) Divisional Commissioner for Specialised Operational Response Services at Lieutenant General. Additionally he is a former Head of Component Specialised Operations at Major General level and Brigadier Section Commander of the elite police tactical unit of the South African Police Service, Special Task Force, conversationally known as the "Taakies", having qualified previously for the difficult selection and training process with the attrition rate of 85% or more in some recruitment cycles. He served in the elite unit as a police special task force operator at Warrant Officer, Captain, Lieutenant Colonel, Colonel and Unit Commander Brigadier. He is a public figure known for his leadership roles in the South African Police Service (SAPS), and gained national recognition for serving as the acting National Police Commissioner.

== Career ==
Mkhwanazi has held several key positions within the South African Police Service (SAPS). He served as the acting National Commissioner of SAPS during a crucial period, addressing national security challenges and implementing law enforcement reforms. His leadership has been characterized by strong action against organized crime and corruption.

In addition to his national roles, Mkhwanazi has contributed significantly to provincial law enforcement in KwaZulu-Natal, focusing on crime prevention and improving community safety. He has been outspoken about the challenges of managing illegal immigration and its impact on crime in the region.

=== Whistle blowing ===
On 6 July 2025, Mkhwanazi made damning allegations against high-ranking police officials and politicians, including Police Minister, Senzo Mchunu, police deputy head Lieutenant-General Shadrack Sibiya and members of the judiciary. He accused them of aiding criminal syndicates, involving themselves in investigations and obstructing justice.

Minister Mchunu released a statement that rebuffed the accusations as baseless, while President Cyril Ramaphosa released a statement that called for restraint from the national security cluster and promised to look into the allegations that were raised in regards to the matter. Police Parliamentary Portfolio Committee Chair Ian Cameron (MP - Democratic Alliance) called for an investigation regarding the claims.

Several marches were organized throughout South Africa by civil society organisations and opposition political parties in support of Mkhwanazi.

On 14 July 2025, President of South Africa Cyril Ramaphosa announced a Judicial Commission of enquiry into the allegations by Mkhwanazi, and placed the Minister of Police Senzo Mchunu on special leave. Hearings of the Madlanga Commission commenced on 17 September 2025.

On 21 July 2025 SAPS arrested individuals relating to the murder of Dj Sumbody, a well-known musician that Mkhwanazi had alleged Minister Mchunu involvement in hindering the arrests of the individuals. In July 2025, President Cyril Ramaphosa suspended the Gauteng Director of Public Prosecutions of the National Prosecuting Authority (NPA) following the allegations made by Mkhwanazi after a two year request for suspension from the National Director Of Public Prosecutions (NPA). Judicial Commission Chair Acting Deputy chief Justice Mbuyiseni Madlanga said they were treating the matter with imminence regarding Lt General Mkhwanazi’s allegations. After South African’s raised funds on back a buddy website to buy him a cow as a gesture of goodwill Lt General Mkhwanazi decided to donate the money to the SAPS (South African Police Service) police education trust meant for children of members who have died in duty.

=== Madlanga Commission ===
In September 2025, Mkhwanazi appeared in front of the Madlanga Commission headed by retired Justice Mbuyiseni Madlanga. The commission was set up in July 2025 by President Cyril Ramaphosa to investigate allegations made by Mkhwanazi of collusion and corruption between politicians, senior police, prosecutors, intelligence operatives, and elements of the judiciary, in South Africa.

== See also ==
- Nosiviwe Mapisa-Nqakula
- Julius Mkhwanazi
- South African Police Service
