= Senzo Mchunu =

South African politician (born 1958)

Edward Senzo Mchunu MP
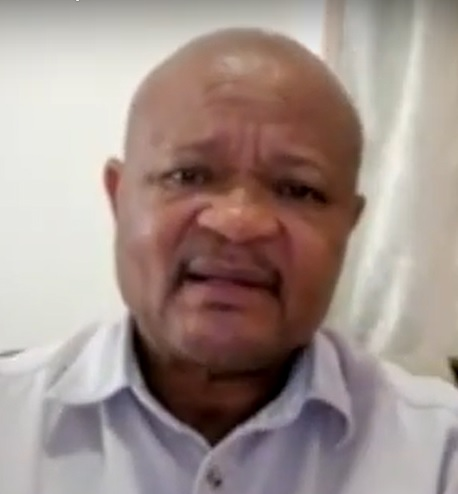

Minister of Police
- Suspended
- In office 3 July 2024 (Note: Suspended since 13 July 2025) – 13 July 2025
- President: Cyril Ramaphosa
- Deputy: Polly Boshielo; Cassel Mathale
- Preceded by: Bheki Cele
- Succeeded by: Firoz Cachalia (Acting, due to suspension)

Minister of Water and Sanitation
- In office 5 August 2021 – 19 June 2024
- President: Cyril Ramaphosa
- Deputy: David Mahlobo; Dikeledi Magadzi; Judith Tshabalala
- Preceded by: Lindiwe Sisulu (for Human Settlements, Water and Sanitation)
- Succeeded by: Pemmy Majodina

Minister of Public Service and Administration
- In office 30 May 2019 – 5 August 2021
- President: Cyril Ramaphosa
- Deputy: Sindy Chikunga
- Preceded by: Ayanda Dlodlo
- Succeeded by: Ayanda Dlodlo

6th Premier of KwaZulu-Natal
- In office 22 August 2013 – 23 May 2016
- Monarch: Goodwill Zwelithini
- Preceded by: Zweli Mkhize
- Succeeded by: Willies Mchunu

Provincial Chairperson of the KwaZulu-Natal African National Congress
- In office March 2013 – November 2015
- Deputy: Willies Mchunu
- Preceded by: Zweli Mkhize
- Succeeded by: Sihle Zikalala

Member of the KwaZulu-Natal Executive Council for Education
- In office May 2009 – September 2013
- Premier: Zweli Mkhize
- Preceded by: Ina Cronjé
- Succeeded by: Peggy Nkonyeni

Personal details
- Born: Edward Senzo Mchunu; 21 April 1958 (age 68) eNhlwathi, Hlabisa; Natal, Union of South Africa
- Party: African National Congress
- Spouse: Thembeka Mchunu (m. 1990)
- Education: University of South Africa; University of Zululand

Edward Senzo Mchunu (born 21 April 1958) is a South African politician who served as Minister of Police from 30 June 2024 until his suspension 13 July 2025. A member of the African National Congress (ANC), he has been a cabinet minister since May 2019. He was formerly the Premier of KwaZulu-Natal between 22 August 2013 and 23 May 2016.

On 13 July 2025, President Cyril Ramaphosa placed Mchunu on leave with immediate effect, pending a judicial commission of inquiry into allegations of corruption and political interference into South Africa's policing authorities. Law Professor Firoz Cachalia was appointed as acting Minister of Police.

A teacher by training, Mchunu was the inaugural Provincial Secretary of the ANC's branch in KwaZulu-Natal after its establishment in 1994, and he was first elected to the KwaZulu-Natal Provincial Legislature in 1997. While still in the legislature, he returned to the ANC Provincial Secretary position from 2005 until May 2009, when he was appointed Member of the Executive Council for Education in Zweli Mkhize's provincial government.

In 2013, he succeeded Mkhize both as ANC Provincial Chairperson and as Premier of KwaZulu-Natal. However, he was ousted from the party office in November 2015 in a bitter contest with Sihle Zikalala. In May 2016 the ANC compelled him to resign from the Premier's office.

Formerly an ally of President Jacob Zuma, Mchunu was politically aligned to Cyril Ramaphosa by 2016. In 2017 he won election to the ANC National Executive Committee and he subsequently served a brief stint as head of organising at Luthuli House, the ANC's national headquarters. Appointed to Ramaphosa's cabinet after the 2019 general election, he served as Minister of Public Service and Administration from May 2019 to August 2021 and then as Minister of Water and Sanitation from August 2021 to June 2024, when he was appointed to his current position. He was re-elected to a second five-year term on the ANC National Executive Committee in December 2022.

== Early life and education ==
Mchunu was born in April 1958 at eNhlwathi in KwaHlabisa in the northern part of present-day KwaZulu-Natal. He attended high school in Pietermaritzburg and later enrolled at the University of Zululand; he completed his degree, a Bachelor of Arts in education and international relations, at the University of South Africa in 1986. After graduating he worked as a teacher at high schools in Nquthu and Eshowe.

In 1991, after the African National Congress (ANC) was unbanned by the apartheid government, Mchunu became the inaugural Regional Secretary of the ANC's branch in Northern Natal. His appointment to this position marked his entrance to professional politics. In 1994, he was elected as the inaugural Provincial Secretary of the ANC's KwaZulu-Natal branch, under Provincial Chairperson Jacob Zuma.

== Provincial political career ==
=== KwaZulu-Natal Legislature: 1997–2009 ===
In 1997, Mchunu was sworn in as a Member of the KwaZulu-Natal Provincial Legislature. Over the next decade, he chaired various committees in the legislature.

He also returned to the ANC's provincial leadership corps from 1998, when he was elected ANC Deputy Provincial Secretary, serving under Provincial Chairperson S'bu Ndebele and Provincial Secretary Sipho Gcabashe. He was re-elected in September 2002 despite a challenge to his incumbency by Mbuso Kubheka: he received 304 votes against Kubheka's 171.

At the party's next provincial elective conference in May 2005, Mchunu was elected to succeed Gcabashe as Provincial Secretary, apparently with the support of Jacob Zuma, who by then was Deputy President of South Africa. While Provincial Secretary, Mchunu – like the incumbent ANC Provincial Chairperson, Zweli Mkhize – was reportedly a strong supporter of Zuma during Zuma's heated rivalry with ANC President Thabo Mbeki. Mchunu was re-elected as Provincial Secretary in June 2008; at that time he remained a Member of the Provincial Legislature.

=== KwaZulu-Natal Executive Council: 2009–2013 ===
In the 2009 general election, Mchunu was re-elected to his legislative seat and Zweli Mkhize was elected Premier of KwaZulu-Natal. On 11 May 2009, Mkhize announced that he had appointed Mchunu to the KwaZulu-Natal provincial government as Member of the Executive Council for Education. Because Mchunu's role as ANC Provincial Secretary was full-time, it was incompatible with his government appointment; he vacated the party office and was replaced by his deputy, Sihle Zikalala, in July. He remained Member of the Executive Council for Education until his own ascension to the premiership in 2013.

Towards the end of his term as Member of the Executive Council, in March 2013, Mchunu was elected Provincial Chairperson of the KwaZulu-Natal ANC, succeeding Mkhize, who had been elected to the full-time position of national ANC Treasurer-General. Mchunu received 385 votes against the 373 votes received by the other candidate, incumbent Deputy Provincial Chairperson Willies Mchunu. According to the Mail & Guardian, his candidacy was opposed by Zuma (who by then was President of South Africa), apparently because Mchunu had not supported Zuma's bid for re-election at the ANC's 53rd National Conference in December 2012.

=== KwaZulu-Natal Premier: 2013–2016 ===
In order to take up the Treasurer-General position, Mkhize also resigned from his government position as KwaZulu-Natal Premier; Mchunu was sworn in as acting Premier on 22 August 2013 and on 26 September 2013 was formally elected to succeed Mkhize. In the 2014 general election, Mchunu was elected to a full term as Premier.

At the ANC's next provincial elective conference in November 2015, Mchunu ran for re-election as ANC Provincial Chairperson but was defeated by his one-time deputy, Sihle Zikalala, who received 780 votes against Mchunu's 675. Mchunu also failed to gain election as an ordinary member of the ANC Provincial Executive Committee. The outcome led to an outbreak of bitter factionalism in the provincial party, reportedly leading to several political assassinations. Mchunu's supporters claimed that the vote had been rigged and successfully challenged it in the courts, leading in late 2017 to the nullification of the election and the dissolution of Zikalala's leadership corps.

However, by then, Mchunu had been removed from the KwaZulu-Natal premiership: he resigned on 23 May 2016 under significant pressure from leaders of both the provincial and the national ANC. He said that he had informed the national ANC leadership that he had "reservations" about the circumstances of his departure. Shortly afterwards, the ANC announced that he would be replaced as Premier by Willies Mchunu and that he would be offered an ANC seat in the national Parliament.

== National political career ==
=== Luthuli House: 2017–2019 ===
Ahead of the ANC's 54th National Conference, Mchunu stood to succeed Gwede Mantashe as ANC Secretary-General. He ran on an informal slate aligned to Cyril Ramaphosa – he was reportedly a longstanding supporter of Ramaphosa's bid to be elected ANC President. Indeed, the Daily Maverick said that Mchunu became Ramaphosa's "chief campaigner in KwaZulu-Natal". At the conference, held at Nasrec in December 2017, Ramaphosa won the presidency but Mchunu lost the Secretary-General position in a vote to Ace Magashule, who received 2,360 votes to Mchunu's 2,336. Because of the narrow 24-vote margin that decided the contest, the outcome was subject to controversy and a recount.

Despite his defeat in the Secretary-General race, the 54th National Conference elected Mchunu to a five-year term as an ordinary member of the ANC National Executive Committee. He received 1,800 votes across the 4,283 ballots cast, making him the 18th-most popular of the 80 candidates elected. In February 2018, he was appointed chairperson of organising and campaigns in the party, a full-time position that was based out of the ANC's national headquarters at Luthuli House in Johannesburg and that involved working closely with the Secretary-General's office. Ramaphosa and his supporters had reportedly pushed for Mchunu to be appointed to the role, while Ace Magashule's preferred candidate was Dakota Legoete, who was appointed Mchunu's deputy.

== National cabinet: 2019–2022 ==
In the 2019 general election, Mchunu was elected as a Member of the National Assembly, ranked 13th on the ANC's party list. Ramaphosa was elected to his first full term as President in the same election, and he appointed Mchunu to his cabinet as Minister of Public Service and Administration. Sindy Chikunga was appointed as Mchunu's deputy.

=== Ministry of Water and Sanitation ===
On 5 August 2021, Ramaphosa announced a cabinet reshuffle in which Mchunu was moved to the Ministry of Water and Sanitation, newly split from the former Ministry of Human Settlements, Water and Sanitation. Dikeledi Magadzi was appointed Deputy Minister for Water and Sanitation in the same reshuffle.

=== Ministry of Police ===
After the May 2024 election, President Cyril Ramaphosa announced his new cabinet in which he appointed Mchunu to the position of Police Minister, succeeding Bheki Cele

On 1 July 2024, South African Police Union, welcomed Mchunu's appointment as the new Police Minister, but also issued a stern warning to stay in his lane and not interfere with operational matters of police. While Police, Prisons and Civil Rights Union, challenged Mchunu to stop the killing of law enforcement officers and over crowded prisons.

On 15 July 2024, Mchunu held a press conference in which he outlined his priorities as Minister of Police, indicating the need to modernize South African policing. He stated that crime levels in the country were too high and intolerable, and that tough measures were needed for certain crime reduction strategies.

In July 2025, KwaZulu-Natal Provincial Police Commissioner Lieutenant General Nhlanhla Mkhwanazi made damning allegations against high-ranking police officials and politicians, including Mchunu, and members of the judiciary where he accused them of aiding criminal syndicates, involving themselves in investigations and obstructing justice. Mchunu released a statement which rebuffed accusations as baseless. African Transformation Movement has since approached the public protector to investigate the allegations against Mchunu. Mchunu released a statement which he denied the controversial meeting with Vusimusi "Cat" Matlala. The Democratic Alliance and MK confirmed they opened a criminal case against Mchunu in Western Cape.

Following the allegations, Mchunu was suspended and put on leave with immediate effect on 13 July 2025 pending a judicial commission of inquiry into allegations of corruption and political interference into South Africa's policing authorities. Economic Freedom Fighters wrote a letter to President stating he doesn't have power to suspend Mchunu. KwaZulu-Natal ANC members found plotting against Mchunu to be dismissed from the cabinet.

In November 2025, Mchunu handed his electronic devices to investigators.

==== Crime ====
In November 2024, Mchunu released the second quarter crime statistics for 2024/2025 financial year, and also reflected on his first 100 days in office. Giving a detailed breakdown of the statistics, Mchunu indicated that murder had decreased by 5.8%, sexual offences by 2.5%, robbery with aggravated circumstances by 8.8%, additionally rape decreased by 3.1%.

==== Construction Mafia ====
Extortion in the South African construction industry has been an issue troubling Mchunu's predecessor Bheki Cele. These extortionists forcefully extract protection fees from local construction companies and contractors or extort a portion of the cost of an infrastructure project, having derailed and delayed construction projects worth billions of Rands. Extortion in the construction industry in South Africa had led to the media dubbing these extortionists the 'Construction Mafia.' On 19 of November 2024, Mchunu as Minister of Police along with the Minister of Public Works and Infrastructure, Dean Macpherson, organized The Summit on Crime-Free Construction Sites at the Durban International Convention Center to address the growing concern surrounding safety and other criminal activity caused by the Construction Mafia. At the Summit Mchunu declared that the Construction Mafia was Public Enemy Number One. Adding that he had roped in the Directorate of Priority Crimes Investigations (DCPI) also known as Hawks (South Africa), to get involved and target the masterminds behind the extortion in the construction industry.

== Madlanga Commission ==
In September 2025, KwaZulu-Natal Provincial Police Commissioner Nhlanhla Mkhwanazi testified to the Madlanga Commission that Mchunu unlawfully disbanded the Political Killings Task Team (PKTT) in December 2024. It was alleged that Mchunu defied odds to protect some criminals sought by the Political Killings Task Team.

Testimony from police officials alleges that Brown Mogotsi is Mchunu's associate who interfered in high-profile police matters and facilitated payments from businessman Vusimusi Matlala for Mchunu's ANC supporters. Evidence presented to the Madlanga Commission, including WhatsApp chats and a letter penned by Mchunu ordering the disbandment of the PKTT, suggests Mogotsi had direct access to the Minister and leveraged this association. Mchunu has publicly denied having a close friendship with Mogotsi or ever meeting Matlala, asserting their interactions were limited to ANC matters, though one witness at the commission testified that Mchunu privately referred to Mogotsi as his "comrade."

In August 2026 Mchunu's name was mentioned by Lieutenant Colonel Deenadayalan “Deena” Govender from the Hawks’ Serious Organised Crime Unit, who testified that Mavuso Ntandani, who is close to Mchunu, arranged a meeting with him prior to his appearance at the commission. Deenadayalan testified that he was put on call with Mchunu, where he was told to throw Mkhwanazi "under the bus" and threatened with jail time and poisoning if he didnt comply. Mchunu denied these allegations in a statement.

=== Parliament Ad Hoc Committee ===
On 20 October 2025, Mchunu appeared before the South African Parliament Ad Hoc committee that was set to investigate claims by Nhlanhla Mkhwanazi.

== ANC NEC ==
At the ANC's 55th National Conference in December 2022, Mchunu was re-elected to a second five-year term on the party's National Executive Committee; he was ranked sixth of the 80 candidates elected, receiving 1,932 votes across 4,029 ballots. In the run-up to the conference, he was also considered a likely running mate for Ramaphosa, who was running for re-election to the ANC presidency; however, he ultimately was not nominated to stand for a top party office. Mchunu later warned that the ANC is on the blink of collapsing if they don't win upcoming local municipal elections.

== Personal life ==
Mchunu married Thembeka (born 31 January 1968) in July 1990. She is also a politician. They have four children – Zinhle, Mathuthu, Jama, and Phakade – and grandchildren.

== See also ==
- Madlanga Commission
- Brown Mogotsi
- Vusimuzi "Cat" Matlala

Political offices
Preceded by Office recreated	Minister of Water and Sanitation; 5 August 2021 –	Incumbent
Preceded by Ayanda Dlodlo	Minister of Public Service and Administration; 30 May 2019 – 5 August 2021	Succeeded by Ayanda Dlodlo
Political offices
Preceded by Zweli Mkhize	Premier of KwaZulu-Natal; 22 August 2013 – 24 May 2016	Next: Willies Mchunu
