= KwaZulu-Natal (National Assembly of South Africa constituency) =

Constituency in South Africa

- iKwaZulu-Natali
- Constituency for the National Assembly of South Africa
- Location of KwaZulu-Natal within South Africa
- Province: KwaZulu-Natal
- Population: 11,531,628 (2020)
- Electorate: 5,524,666 (2019)

Current constituency
- Created: 1994
- Seats: List: 41 (2019–present); 40 (2014–2019); 39 (2009–2014); 37 (2004–2009); 38 (–2004)
- Members of the National Assembly: List: Laetitia Arries (EFF); Elphas Buthelezi (IFP); Mangosuthu Buthelezi (IFP); Sbuyiselwe Angela Buthelezi (IFP); Russel Cebekhulu (IFP); Mergan Chetty (DA); Sibongiseni Maxwell Dhlomo (ANC); Mervyn Dirks (ANC); Nkosinathi Emmanuel Dlamini (ANC); Nkosazana Dlamini-Zuma (ANC); Nomalungelo Gina (ANC); Sibusiso Nigel Gumede (ANC); Magdalena Hlengwa (IFP); Haniff Hoosen (DA); John Jeffery (ANC); Makoti Khawula (EFF); Fikile Eunice Khumalo (ANC); Dianne Kohler Barnard (DA); Alf Lees (DA); Regina Mina Mpontseng Lesoma (ANC); Mandlenkosi Mabika (DA); Dean Macpherson (DA); Phiwaba Madokwe (EFF); Senzo Mchunu (ANC); Thembeka Vuyisile Buyisile Mchunu (ANC); Sibusiso Welcome Mdabe (ANC); Lindiwe Ntombikayise Mjobo (ANC); Zweli Mkhize (ANC); Jabulile Cynthia Nightingale Mkhwanazi (ANC); Terence Skhumbuzo Mpanza (ANC); Alice Mthembu (ANC); Ernest Myeni (ANC); Sibongiseni Ngcobo (DA); Siphosethu Ngcobo (IFP); Nobuhle Pamela Nkabane (ANC); Makhoni Maria Ntuli (ANC); Mthokozisi Nxumalo (IFP); Njabulo Nzuza (ANC); Lizzie Fikelephi Shabalala (ANC); Maliyakhe Shelembe (DA); Mzwakhe Sibisi (NFP); Duduzile Patricia Sibiya (ANC); Narend Singh (IFP); Luvuyo Tafeni (EFF); Hannah Winkler (DA); Cyril Xaba (ANC); Beauty Thulani Zibula (ANC); Mthenjwa Zondi (ANC); Audrey Zuma (ANC); Thandiwe Zungu (ANC)

KwaZulu-Natal (Zulu: iKwaZulu-Natali) is one of the nine multi-member constituencies of the National Assembly of South Africa, the lower house of the Parliament of South Africa, the national legislature of South Africa. The constituency was established in 1994 when the National Assembly was established by the Interim Constitution following the end of Apartheid. It is conterminous with the province of KwaZulu-Natal. The constituency currently elects 41 of the 400 members of the National Assembly using the closed party-list proportional representation electoral system. At the 2019 general election it had 5,524,666 registered electors.

== Electoral system ==
KwaZulu-Natal currently elects 41 of the 400 members of the National Assembly using the closed party-list proportional representation electoral system. Constituency seats are allocated using the largest remainder method with a Droop quota.

== Election results ==
=== Summary ===
Election	Pan Africanist Congress PAC			United Democratic Movement UDM			African National Congress ANC			Democratic Alliance DA/DP			New National Party NNP/NP			African Christian Democratic Party ACDP			Inkatha Freedom Party IFP			Economic Freedom Fighters EFF			Freedom Front Plus VF+/VFFF/VV-FF		
Election	Votes	%	Seats	Votes	%	Seats	Votes	%	Seats	Votes	%	Seats	Votes	%	Seats	Votes	%	Seats	Votes	%	Seats	Votes	%	Seats	Votes	%	Seats
2019	2,342	0.06%	0	3,677	0.10%	0	2,026,069	55.47%	24	520,169	14.24%	6				17,524	0.48%	0	532,563	14.58%	6	363,832	9.96%	4	16,460	0.45%	0
2014	2,723	0.07%	0	7,232	0.19%	0	2,530,827	65.31%	27	517,461	13.35%	5				15,406	0.40%	0	393,949	10.17%	4	76,384	1.97%	1	9,687	0.25%	0
2009	1,852	0.05%	0	7,529	0.21%	0	2,256,248	63.97%	26	364,518	10.33%	4				20,851	0.59%	0	723,940	20.52%	8				6,600	0.19%	0
2004	5,712	0.21%	0	23,099	0.84%	0	1,312,767	47.47%	18	276,429	10.00%	4	16,145	0.58%	0	49,823	1.80%	1	964,101	34.87%	13				9,424	0.34%	0
1999	8,414	0.28%	0	38,080	1.29%	0	1,176,926	39.77%	15	288,738	9.76%	4	117,107	3.96%	1	53,799	1.82%	1	1,196,955	40.45%	16				6,044	0.20%	0
1994	23,098	0.62%					1,185,669	31.61%		60,499	1.61%		591,212	15.76%		17,122	0.46%		1,822,385	48.59%					17,092	0.46%	

=== Detailed ===
==== 2024 ====
Results of the regional ballot for KwaZulu-Natal in the 2024 general election held on 29 May 2024:

Party/Candidate	Votes	%	Seats	+/–
uMkhonto weSizwe	1,574,202	44.91	19	New
Inkatha Freedom Party	640,683	18.28	8	+2
African National Congress	603,459	17.22	7	–17
Democratic Alliance	471,830	13.46	6	0
Economic Freedom Fighters	83,465	2.38	1	–3
National Freedom Party	20,716	0.59	0	–1
African Christian Democratic Party	11,593	0.33	0	0
ActionSA	10,455	0.30	0	New
Allied Movement for Change	8,676	0.25	0	New
Patriotic Alliance	7,587	0.22	0	0
Al Jama-ah	7,127	0.20	0	0
Democratic Liberal Congress	7,022	0.20	0	0
African Transformation Movement	6,577	0.19	0	0
Freedom Front Plus	5,620	0.16	0	0
Build One South Africa	4,856	0.14	0	New
African People's Movement	4,201	0.12	0	New
Rise Mzansi	4,152	0.12	0	New
Pan Africanist Congress of Azania	3,338	0.10	0	0
Abantu Batho Congress	3,133	0.09	0	New
Good	2,868	0.08	0	0
Azanian People's Organisation	2,804	0.08	0	0
United Democratic Movement	2,796	0.08	0	0
Congress of the People	2,398	0.07	0	0
South African Rainbow Alliance	2,145	0.06	0	New
United Independent Movement	2,114	0.06	0	New
Alliance of Citizens for Change	1,828	0.05	0	New
Sizwe Ummah Nation	1,472	0.04	0	New
African People's Convention	1,422	0.04	0	0
Citizans	1,161	0.03	0	New
African Movement Congress	1,149	0.03	0	New
Organic Humanity Movement	1,078	0.03	0	New
Africa Restoration Alliance	840	0.02	0	New
Economic Liberators Forum South Africa	721	0.02	0	New
Africa Africans Reclaim	643	0.02	0	New
People's Movement for Change	593	0.02	0	New
Free Democrats	407	0.01	0	0
Total	3,505,131	100.00	41	–
Valid votes	3,505,131	98.95		
Invalid/blank votes	37,086	1.05		
Total votes	3,542,217	100.00		
Registered voters/turnout	5,738,249	61.73		

The following candidates were elected.

Name	Party
Mazwi Blose	EFF
Nicole Bollman	DA
Elphas Buthelezi	IFP
Sbuyiselwe Angela Buthelezi	IFP
Russel Cebekhulu	IFP
Mergan Chetty	DA
Sibongiseni Dhlomo	ANC
Nompumelelo Gasa	MK
Nomalungelo Gina	ANC
Thamsanqa Khuzwayo	MK
Bhekizizwe Luthuli	IFP
Busaphi Machi	IFP
Dean Macpherson	DA
Emerald Madlala	MK
Japhta Malinga	MK
Gugulethu Mchunu	MK
Mlondi Mdluli	DA
Nompumelelo Mhlongo	IFP
Thembinkosi Mjadu	MK
Siyabonga Mkhize	MK
Ntombenhle Mkhize	MK
Zweli Mkhize	ANC
Nombuso Mtolo	ANC
Nokwethemba Mtshweni	MK
Sanele Mwali	MK
Pinky Ncube	MK
Siphosethu Ngcobo	IFP
Nobuhle Nkabane	ANC
Sibonelo Nomvalo	MK
Delisile Ntshaba	MK
Nkosinathi Nxumalo	MK
Shaggy Radebe	MK
Lungisani Shangase	MK
Maliyakhe Shelembe	DA
Jomo Sibiya	ANC
Shaik Imraan Subrathie	ANC
Sphesihle Zondi	DA
Sanele Zondo	IFP
Sifiso Zungu	MK

==== 2019 ====
Results of the national ballot for KwaZulu-Natal in the 2019 general election held on 8 May 2019:

Party	Votes	%	Seats	+/–
African National Congress	2,026,069	55.47	24	–3
Inkatha Freedom Party	532,563	14.58	6	+2
Democratic Alliance	520,169	14.24	6	+1
Economic Freedom Fighters	363,832	9.96	4	+3
National Freedom Party	52,431	1.44	1	–2
African Christian Democratic Party	17,524	0.48	0	0
Freedom Front Plus	16,460	0.45	0	0
African Transformation Movement	16,109	0.44	0	New
African Independent Congress	10,118	0.28	0	0
Minority Front	9,792	0.27	0	0
African Security Congress	8,493	0.23	0	New
Black First Land First	7,998	0.22	0	New
Democratic Liberal Congress	7,181	0.20	0	New
Al Jama-ah	5,731	0.16	0	0
Congress of the People	5,101	0.14	0	0
Afrikan Alliance of Social Democrats	5,099	0.14	0	New
Socialist Revolutionary Workers Party	4,173	0.11	0	New
United Democratic Movement	3,677	0.10	0	0
African People's Convention	3,274	0.09	0	0
Agang South Africa	3,105	0.09	0	0
Good	2,808	0.08	0	New
Pan Africanist Congress of Azania	2,342	0.06	0	0
National People's Front	2,243	0.06	0	New
Capitalist Party of South Africa	2,239	0.06	0	New
Azanian People's Organisation	2,162	0.06	0	0
People's Revolutionary Movement	1,891	0.05	0	New
Economic Emancipation Forum	1,859	0.05	0	New
Alliance for Transformation for All	1,821	0.05	0	New
Independent Civic Organisation of South Africa	1,378	0.04	0	0
International Revelation Congress	1,343	0.04	0	New
African Renaissance Unity Party	1,300	0.04	0	New
Forum for Service Delivery	1,253	0.03	0	New
African Content Movement	1,180	0.03	0	New
National People's Ambassadors	1,132	0.03	0	New
Christian Political Movement	961	0.03	0	New
Women Forward	882	0.02	0	0
Compatriots of South Africa	867	0.02	0	New
African Democratic Change	836	0.02	0	New
African Congress of Democrats	784	0.02	0	New
African Covenant	691	0.02	0	New
Front National	669	0.02	0	0
Power of Africans Unity	631	0.02	0	New
Free Democrats	538	0.01	0	New
Land Party	515	0.01	0	New
Patriotic Alliance	513	0.01	0	0
Better Residents Association	428	0.01	0	0
South African National Congress of Traditional Authorities	221	0.01	0	New
South African Maintenance and Estate Beneficiaries Association	191	0.01	0	New
Total	3,652,577	100.00	41	+1
Valid votes	3,652,577	98.29		
Invalid/blank votes	63,408	1.71		
Total votes	3,715,985	100.00		
Registered voters/turnout	5,524,666	67.26		

The following candidates were elected: Elphas Buthelezi (IFP), Russel Cebekhulu (IFP), Sibongiseni Dhlomo (ANC), Mervyn Dirks (ANC), Dora Dlamini (ANC), Nomalungelo Gina (ANC), Hlanganani Gumbi (DA), Sibusiso Gumede (ANC), Magdalena Hlengwa (IFP), Bavelile Hlongwa (ANC), Haniff Hoosen (DA), John Jeffery (ANC), Peter Keetse (EFF), Makoti Khawula (EFF), Alf Lees (DA), Regina Lesoma (ANC), Dean Macpherson (DA), Madimetja Lorence Matsetela (EFF), Thembeka Mchunu (ANC), Sibusiso Mdabe (ANC), Jabulile Mkhwanazi (ANC), Mmabatho Mokause (EFF), Alice Mthembu (ANC), Ernest Myeni (ANC), Sibongiseni Ngcobo (DA), Siphosethu Ngcobo (IFP), Xolani Ngwezi (IFP), Nobuhle Nkabane (ANC), Eric Makhosini Nkosi (ANC), Maria Ntuli (ANC), Mthokozisi Nxumalo (IFP), Njabulo Nzuza (ANC), Lizzie Shabalala (ANC), Nomvuzo Shabalala (ANC), Mzwakhe Sibisi (NFP), Duduzile Sibiya (ANC), Hannah Winkler (DA), Cyril Xaba (ANC), Beauty Zibula (ANC), Audrey Zuma (ANC) and Thandiwe Zungu (ANC).

==== 2014 ====
Results of the 2014 general election held on 7 May 2014:

Party		Votes	%	Seats
African National Congress	ANC	2,530,827	65.31%	27
Democratic Alliance	DA	517,461	13.35%	5
Inkatha Freedom Party	IFP	393,949	10.17%	4
National Freedom Party	NFP	249,118	6.43%	3
Economic Freedom Fighters	EFF	76,384	1.97%	1
African Independent Congress	AIC	19,309	0.50%	0
Minority Front	MF	18,924	0.49%	0
African Christian Democratic Party	ACDP	15,406	0.40%	0
Freedom Front Plus	VF+	9,687	0.25%	0
United Democratic Movement	UDM	7,232	0.19%	0
Congress of the People	COPE	5,553	0.14%	0
African People's Convention	APC	4,390	0.11%	0
Al Jama-ah		4,288	0.11%	0
Agang South Africa	AGANG SA	3,413	0.09%	0
Azanian People's Organisation	AZAPO	2,967	0.08%	0
Pan Africanist Congress of Azania	PAC	2,723	0.07%	0
Workers and Socialist Party	WASP	2,005	0.05%	0
United Christian Democratic Party	UCDP	1,838	0.05%	0
Keep It Straight and Simple Party	KISS	1,404	0.04%	0
Ubuntu Party	UBUNTU	1,330	0.03%	0
Independent Civic Organisation of South Africa	ICOSA	1,082	0.03%	0
Patriotic Alliance	PA	1,004	0.03%	0
Kingdom Governance Movement	KGM	922	0.02%	0
Pan Africanist Movement	PAM	826	0.02%	0
Front National	FN	769	0.02%	0
First Nation Liberation Alliance	FINLA	667	0.02%	0
United Congress	UNICO	575	0.01%	0
Bushbuckridge Residents Association	BRA	462	0.01%	0
Peoples Alliance	PAL	318	0.01%	0
Valid Votes		3,874,833	100.00%	40
Rejected Votes		60,938	1.55%	
Total Polled		3,935,771	76.91%	
Registered Electors		5,117,131		

The following candidates were elected: Simphiwe Donatus Bekwa (ANC), Phumzile Bhengu (ANC), Trevor Bonhomme (ANC), Tim Brauteseth (DA), Bheki Cele (ANC), Mosie Cele (ANC), Mervyn Dirks (ANC), Bongekile Jabulile Dlomo (ANC), Zephroma Sizani Dlamini-Dubazana (ANC), Dennis Dumisani Gamede (ANC), Ndabakayise Erasmus Gcwabaza (ANC), Nomalungelo Gina (ANC), Donald Gumede (ANC), Mkhuleko Hlengwa (IFP), John Jeffery (ANC), Sandy Kalyan (DA), Makoti Khawula (EFF), Makhosi Khoza (ANC), Luwellyn Landers (ANC), Regina Lesoma (ANC), Sahlulele Luzipo (ANC), Mandlenkosi Mabika (NFP), Dean Macpherson (DA), Celiwe Madlopha (ANC), Nosilivere Winifred Magadla (ANC), Lindiwe Mazibuko (DA), Sibongile Mchunu (ANC), Thandi Memela (ANC), Lindiwe Mjobo (ANC), Lungi Mnganga-Gcabashe (ANC), Albert Mncwango (IFP), Alfred Mpontshane (IFP), Enock Muzi Mthethwa (ANC), Nhlanhla Nene (ANC), Beatrice Ngcobo (ANC), Munzoor Shaik Emam (NFP), Maliyakhe Shelembe (NFP), Narend Singh (IFP), John Steenhuisen (DA) and Barbara Thomson (ANC).

==== 2009 ====
Results of the 2009 general election held on 22 April 2009:

Party		Votes	%	Seats
African National Congress	ANC	2,256,248	63.97%	26
Inkatha Freedom Party	IFP	723,940	20.52%	8
Democratic Alliance	DA	364,518	10.33%	4
Congress of the People	COPE	54,611	1.55%	1
Minority Front	MF	38,944	1.10%	0
African Christian Democratic Party	ACDP	20,851	0.59%	0
Movement Democratic Party	MDP	7,917	0.22%	0
United Democratic Movement	UDM	7,529	0.21%	0
Independent Democrats	ID	7,086	0.20%	0
Freedom Front Plus	VF+	6,600	0.19%	0
Azanian People's Organisation	AZAPO	6,322	0.18%	0
Al Jama-ah		6,261	0.18%	0
National Democratic Convention	NADECO	4,385	0.12%	0
African People's Convention	APC	4,199	0.12%	0
South African Democratic Congress	SADECO	2,695	0.08%	0
Keep It Straight and Simple Party	KISS	2,410	0.07%	0
United Independent Front	UIF	2,128	0.06%	0
Pan Africanist Congress of Azania	PAC	1,852	0.05%	0
Alliance of Free Democrats	AFD	1,454	0.04%	0
Great Kongress of South Africa	GKSA	1,389	0.04%	0
United Christian Democratic Party	UCDP	1,326	0.04%	0
Women Forward	WF	1,202	0.03%	0
New Vision Party	NVP	1,199	0.03%	0
Christian Democratic Alliance	CDA	1,026	0.03%	0
A Party		621	0.02%	0
Pan Africanist Movement	PAM	521	0.01%	0
Valid Votes		3,527,234	100.00%	39
Rejected Votes		47,092	1.32%	
Total Polled		3,574,326	79.87%	
Registered Electors		4,475,217		

The following candidates were elected: Roy Ainslie (ANC), Phumzile Bhengu (ANC), Trevor Bonhomme (ANC), Gloria Borman (ANC), Russel Cebekhulu (IFP), Zephroma Sizani Dubazana (ANC), Mike Ellis (DA), Ndabakayise Erasmus Gcwabaza (ANC), Nomalungelo Gina (ANC), Donald Gumede (ANC), Shiaan-Bin Huang (ANC), John Jeffery (ANC), Fikile Khumalo (ANC), Gregory Krumbock (DA), Luwellyn Landers (ANC), Eric Lucas (IFP), Albertinah Luthuli (ANC), Graham Peter Dalziel Mac Kenzie (COPE), Lindiwe Mazibuko (DA), Mandla Mbili (ANC), Hlengiwe Mgabadeli (ANC), Lindiwe Mjobo (ANC), Senzo Mkhize (ANC), Nomfundo Ntombenhle Penelope Mkhulusi (ANC), Gareth Morgan (DA), Alfred Mpontshane (IFP), Hilda Sizakele Msweli (IFP), Enock Muzi Mthethwa (ANC), Gabriel Ndabandaba (ANC), Velaphi Ndlovu (IFP), Beatrice Ngcobo (ANC), Zwelifile Ntuli (ANC), Ntombikayise Sibhida (ANC), Narend Singh (IFP), Peter Smith (IFP), Jabu Sosibo (ANC), Barbara Thomson (ANC), Musa Zondi (IFP) and Zeblon Zulu (ANC).

==== 2004 ====
Results of the 2004 general election held on 14 April 2004:

Party		Votes	%	Seats
African National Congress	ANC	1,312,767	47.47%	18
Inkatha Freedom Party	IFP	964,101	34.87%	13
Democratic Alliance	DA	276,429	10.00%	4
Minority Front	MF	51,339	1.86%	1
African Christian Democratic Party	ACDP	49,823	1.80%	1
United Democratic Movement	UDM	23,099	0.84%	0
Independent Democrats	ID	20,656	0.75%	0
New National Party	NNP	16,145	0.58%	0
Freedom Front Plus	VF+	9,424	0.34%	0
Azanian People's Organisation	AZAPO	6,562	0.24%	0
Pan Africanist Congress of Azania	PAC	5,712	0.21%	0
Christian Democratic Party	CDP	4,562	0.16%	0
United Christian Democratic Party	UCDP	4,235	0.15%	0
Socialist Party of Azania	SOPA	4,110	0.15%	0
United Front	UF	3,334	0.12%	0
Peace and Justice Congress	PJC	2,792	0.10%	0
Employment Movement for South Africa	EMSA	2,400	0.09%	0
National Action	NA	2,391	0.09%	0
Keep It Straight and Simple Party	KISS	2,197	0.08%	0
The Organisation Party	TOP	2,112	0.08%	0
New Labour Party		1,013	0.04%	0
Valid Votes		2,765,203	100.00%	37
Rejected Votes		42,682	1.52%	
Total Polled		2,807,885	73.51%	
Registered Electors		3,819,864		

The following candidates were elected: Roy Ainslie (ANC), Yusuf Bhamjee (ANC), Mfuniselwa Bhengu (IFP), Ruth Bhengu (ANC), Phumzile Bhengu (ANC), Happy Blose (ANC), Siyabonga Cwele (ANC), Beauty Dambuza (ANC), Cheryllyn Dudley (ACDP), Ebrahim Ebrahim (ANC), Mike Ellis (DA), Lucky Gabela (ANC), Ndabakayise Erasmus Gcwabaza (ANC), Malusi Gigaba (ANC), Shiaan-Bin Huang (ANC), Sandy Kalyan (DA), Dianne Kohler Barnard (DA), Albertinah Luthuli (ANC), Nozizwe Madlala-Routledge (ANC), Makhosazana Mdlalose (IFP), Zakhele Sipho Mkhize (ANC), Alfred Mpontshane (IFP), Velaphi Ndlovu (IFP), Mzikayise Vincent Ngema (IFP), Bonginkosi Christopher Ngiba (IFP), Maria Ntuli (ANC), Samuel Neocleous Nxumalo (ANC), Margaret Rajbally (MF), Usha Roopnarain (IFP), Sybil Seaton (IFP), Rafeek Shah (DA), Peter Smith (IFP), Ellis Vezi (IFP), Everson Xolo (ANC), Musa Zondi (IFP) and Nhlahla Zulu (IFP).

==== 1999 ====
Results of the 1999 general election held on 2 June 1999:

Party		Votes	%	Seats
Inkatha Freedom Party	IFP	1,196,955	40.45%	16
African National Congress	ANC	1,176,926	39.77%	15
Democratic Party	DP	288,738	9.76%	4
New National Party	NNP	117,107	3.96%	1
African Christian Democratic Party	ACDP	53,799	1.82%	1
Minority Front	MF	43,026	1.45%	1
United Democratic Movement	UDM	38,080	1.29%	0
Federal Alliance	FA	8,984	0.30%	0
Pan Africanist Congress of Azania	PAC	8,414	0.28%	0
Freedom Front	VFFF	6,044	0.20%	0
Afrikaner Eenheidsbeweging	AEB	5,878	0.20%	0
Azanian People's Organisation	AZAPO	4,525	0.15%	0
Abolition of Income Tax and Usury Party	AITUP	3,206	0.11%	0
United Christian Democratic Party	UCDP	2,671	0.09%	0
Socialist Party of Azania	SOPA	2,658	0.09%	0
Government by the People Green Party	GPGP	1,952	0.07%	0
Valid Votes		2,958,963	100.00%	38
Rejected Votes		52,769	1.75%	
Total Polled		3,011,732	87.45%	
Registered Electors		3,443,978		

==== 1994 ====
Results of the national ballot for KwaZulu-Natal in the 1994 general election held between 26 and 29 April 1994:

Party	Votes	%	Seats
Inkatha Freedom Party	1,822,385	48.59	20
African National Congress	1,185,669	31.61	13
National Party	591,212	15.76	6
Democratic Party	60,499	1.61	1
Pan Africanist Congress of Azania	23,098	0.62	0
African Christian Democratic Party	17,122	0.46	0
Freedom Front	17,092	0.46	0
Africa Muslim Party	6,790	0.18	0
Minority Front	6,410	0.17	0
African Democratic Movement	3,819	0.10	0
Federal Party	3,347	0.09	0
African Moderates Congress Party	3,305	0.09	0
Sport Organisation for Collective Contributions and Equal Rights	2,311	0.06	0
Dikwankwetla Party of South Africa	1,927	0.05	0
Ximoko Progressive Party	1,501	0.04	0
Workers' List Party	1,193	0.03	0
Keep It Straight and Simple Party	1,010	0.03	0
Luso-South African Party	961	0.03	0
Women's Rights Peace Party	955	0.03	0
Total	3,750,606	100.00	40
Valid votes	3,750,606	98.78	
Invalid/blank votes	46,407	1.22	
Total votes	3,797,013	100.00	
