= Same-sex marriage in South Africa =

Same-sex marriage has been legal in South Africa since the Civil Union Act, 2006 came into force on 30 November 2006. The decision of the Constitutional Court in the case of Minister of Home Affairs v Fourie on 1 December 2005 extended the common-law definition of marriage to include same-sex spouses—as the Constitution of South Africa guarantees equal protection before the law to all citizens regardless of sexual orientation—and gave Parliament one year to rectify the inequality in the marriage statutes. On 14 November 2006, the National Assembly passed a law allowing same-sex couples to legally solemnise their union 229 to 41, which was subsequently approved by the National Council of Provinces on 28 November in a 36 to 11 vote, and the law came into effect two days later.

South Africa was the fifth country in the world to legalise same-sex marriage after the Netherlands, Belgium, Spain and Canada, and remains the only African country to have done so. Polling suggests that a majority of South Africans support the legal recognition of same-sex marriage.

== History ==
=== Background ===
South Africa was the first country in the world to safeguard sexual orientation as a human right in its Constitution. The Constitution of South Africa, which took effect on 4 February 1997, forbids discrimination on the basis of sex, gender or sexual orientation. These equality rights formed the basis for a series of court decisions granting specific rights to couples in long-term same-sex relationships:

- National Coalition for Gay and Lesbian Equality v Minister of Justice (1998) decriminalised consensual sexual activities between men.
- Langemaat v Minister of Safety and Security (1998) recognised the reciprocal duty of support between same-sex partners, and extended health insurance benefits.
- National Coalition for Gay and Lesbian Equality v Minister of Home Affairs (1999) extended immigration benefits to foreign partners of South African citizens.
- Satchwell v President of the Republic of South Africa (2002) extended remuneration and pension benefits.
- Du Toit v Minister of Welfare and Population Development (2002) allowed same-sex couples to adopt children jointly.
- J v Director General, Department of Home Affairs (2003) allowed both partners to be recorded as the parents of a child conceived through artificial insemination.
- Du Plessis v Road Accident Fund (2003) recognised the claim for loss of support when a same-sex partner is negligently killed.
- Gory v Kolver NO (2006) allowed inheritance of the estate of a partner who died intestate.

=== The Fourie case ===
In 2002, a lesbian couple, Marié Fourie and Cecelia Bonthuys, with the support of the Lesbian and Gay Equality Project, launched an application in the Pretoria High Court to have their union recognised and recorded by the Department of Home Affairs as a valid marriage. Judge Pierre Roux dismissed the application on 18 October 2002 on the technical basis that they had not properly attacked the constitutionality of the definition of marriage or the Marriage Act, 1961. Fourie and Bonthuys requested leave to appeal to the Constitutional Court, but this was denied and the High Court instead granted leave to appeal to the Supreme Court of Appeal (SCA). They applied to the Constitutional Court for direct access, but this was denied on 31 July 2003; the court stated that the case raised complex issues of common and statutory law on which the SCA's views should first be heard.

Fourie and Bonthuys therefore appealed the High Court judgment to the SCA, which handed down its decision on 30 November 2004. The five-judge court ruled unanimously that the common-law definition of marriage was invalid because it unconstitutionally discriminated on the basis of sexual orientation, and that it should be extended to read "Marriage is the union of two persons to the exclusion of all others for life." The court further unanimously noted that because Fourie and Bonthuys had not challenged the Marriage Act, the court could not invalidate it, and, therefore, their marriage could not immediately be solemnized. The court divided, however, on whether the couple should be given an immediate remedy in implementing the new, wider common-law definition of marriage. The majority opinion, written by Judge Edwin Cameron, ruled that the new definition should apply immediately. In a dissenting opinion, Judge Ian Farlam was of the opinion that the court's order declaring the common-law definition invalid should be suspended for two years to allow Parliament to adopt its own remedy for the situation. The Government of South Africa appealed the SCA's ruling to the Constitutional Court, arguing that a major alteration to the institution of marriage was for Parliament and not the courts to decide, while Fourie and Bonthuys cross-appealed, arguing that the Marriage Act should be altered as Judge Farlam had suggested. In the meanwhile, the Lesbian and Gay Equality Project had also launched a separate lawsuit directly attacking the constitutionality of the Marriage Act, which was originally to be heard in the Johannesburg High Court; the Constitutional Court granted the Project's request to have it heard and decided simultaneously with the Fourie case.

On 1 December 2005, the Constitutional Court handed down its decision: the nine justices agreed unanimously that the common-law definition of marriage and the marriage formula in the Marriage Act, to the extent that they excluded same-sex partners from marriage, were unfairly discriminatory, unjustifiable, and therefore unconstitutional and invalid. In a widely quoted passage from the majority ruling, Justice Albie Sachs wrote:

The exclusion of same-sex couples from the benefits and responsibilities of marriage, accordingly, is not a small and tangential inconvenience resulting from a few surviving relics of societal prejudice destined to evaporate like the morning dew. It represents a harsh if oblique statement by the law that same-sex couples are outsiders, and that their need for affirmation and protection of their intimate relations as human beings is somehow less than that of heterosexual couples. It reinforces the wounding notion that they are to be treated as biological oddities, as failed or lapsed human beings who do not fit into normal society, and, as such, do not qualify for the full moral concern and respect that our Constitution seeks to secure for everyone. It signifies that their capacity for love, commitment and accepting responsibility is by definition less worthy of regard than that of heterosexual couples.

— Paragraph 71 of the judgment

There was some disagreement about the remedy: the majority (eight of the justices) ruled that the declaration of invalidity should be suspended for a year to allow Parliament to correct the situation, as there were different ways in which this could be done, and the Law Reform Commission had already investigated several proposals. If Parliament did not end the inequality by 1 December 2006, then words would automatically be "read in" to the Marriage Act to allow same-sex marriages. Justice Kate O'Regan dissented, arguing that these words should be read in immediately.

=== Civil Union Act ===
On 24 August 2006, the Cabinet approved the Civil Union Bill for submission to Parliament. The bill as initially introduced would only have allowed civil partnerships, which would have been open only to same-sex couples and have the same legal consequences as marriage. It also included provisions to recognise domestic partnerships between unmarried partners, both same-sex and opposite-sex. The state law advisers, who screen laws for constitutionality and form, declined to certify the bill, suggesting that it failed to follow the guidelines laid down by the Constitutional Court. The Joint Working Group, a network of LGBT organisations, described the idea of a separate marriage law for same-sex couples as "an apartheid way of thinking". On 16 September, thousands of South Africans took to the streets in several cities to protest same-sex marriage. The minor opposition African Christian Democratic Party (ACDP) pushed for a constitutional amendment to define marriage as between "a man and a woman"; this was rejected by the National Assembly's Portfolio Committee on Home Affairs. Public hearings on the bill began on 20 September. On 7 October, the Marriage Alliance organised a march to the Union Buildings in Pretoria to hand a memorandum opposing same-sex marriage to government representatives. On 9 October, the governing African National Congress (ANC) voted to support the bill. Although the party had been split on the issue, the vote meant that ANC MPs would be obliged to support the bill in Parliament. The full party support came after members of the national executive committee reminded party members that the ANC had fought for human rights, which includes LGBT rights.

It was originally expected that the National Assembly would vote on the bill on 20 October in order to allow enough time for the National Council of Provinces to debate and vote on it ahead of the 1 December deadline. The vote was repeatedly delayed as the Portfolio Committee on Home Affairs was still involved in discussions. In response to the argument that 'separate but equal' civil partnerships would not comply with the Constitutional Court's ruling, the Portfolio Committee amended the bill to allow either marriages or civil partnerships, and to allow them to both same-sex and opposite-sex couples. The chapter dealing with the recognition of domestic partnerships was removed. On 13 November, one day before the bill would be read for a final reading in the National Assembly, Defence Minister Mosiuoa Lekota said:

The roots of this bill lie in many years of struggle... This country cannot afford to be a prison of timeworn prejudices which have no basis in modern society. Let us bequeath to future generations a society which is more democratic and tolerant than the one that was handed down to us.

The amended bill was passed by the National Assembly on 14 November by 229 votes to 41, and by the National Council of Provinces on 28 November by 36 votes to 11. Deputy President Phumzile Mlambo-Ngcuka, acting for President Thabo Mbeki, signed it into law on 29 November, and it became law the following day, one day before the Constitutional Court's order would otherwise have come into force. Minister of Home Affairs Nosiviwe Mapisa-Nqakula said the law was only a temporary measure, noting that a fuller marriage law would be formulated to harmonise the several pieces of marriage legislation now in force.

14 November 2006 vote in the National Assembly
Party	Voted for	Voted against	Abstained	Absent (Did not vote)
G African National Congress	206: Roy Ainslie; Tuelo Anthony; Jonathan Arendse; Kader Asmal; Ngconde Balfour; Richard Baloyi; Jean Benjamin; Francois Beukman; Yusuf Bhamjee; Fezile Bhengu; Dennis Bloem; Hendrietta Bogopane-Zulu; Trevor Bonhomme; Mnyamezeli Booi; Cecil Burgess; Ismail Cachalia; Yunus Carrim; Shakes Cele; Judy Chalmers; Hlomane Chauke; Fatima Chohan; Hannes Combrinck; Jeremy Cronin; Siyabonga Cwele; Johnny de Lange; Nelson Diale; Thoko Didiza; Mgolodi Dikgacwi; Winkie Direko; Sello Dithebe; David Dlali; Geoff Doidge; Dirk du Toit; Alec Erwin; Ben Fihla; Geraldine Fraser-Moleketi; Cedric Frolick; Joan Fubbs; Pico Gabanakgosi; André Gaum; Mluleki George; Pierre-Jeanne Gerber; Malusi Gigaba; Chris Gololo; Donald Gumede; Mogomotsi Gumede; Lindiwe Hendricks; Peter Hendrickse; Barbara Hogan; Shiaan-Bin Huang; Loretta Jacobus; John Jeffery; Carol Johnson; Lulu Johnson; Pallo Jordan; Lerumo Kalako; Rebecca Kasienyane; Ronnie Kasrils; Danny Kekana; Peter Khoarai; Eric Kholwane; Kenneth Khumalo; Butana Komphela; Gerhard Koornhof; Zunaid Kotwal; Luwellyn Landers; George Lekgetho; Mosiuoa Lekota; Tshiwela Lishivha; Sam Louw; Tsietsi Louw; Cikizwa Ludwabe; Jerome Maake; Brigitte Mabandla; Curtis Mabena; Lawrence Maduma; Maureen Madumise; Emmanuel Magubane; Gratitude Magwanishe; Themba Mahlaba; Gwen Mahlangu-Nkabinde; Samson Mahote; Shoahlane Maja; Caroline Makasi; Wendy Makgate; Lorna Maloney; Nono Maloyi; Peter Maluleka; Dan Maluleke; Sibongile Manana; Trevor Manuel; Nosiviwe Mapisa-Nqakula; Puleng Mashangoane; Lolo Mashiane; Refilwe Mashigo; Buoang Mashile; Michael Masutha; Piet Mathebe; Motswaledi Matlala; Wendy Matsemela; Ivy Matsepe-Casaburri; Jane Matsomela; Shepherd Mayatula; Ali Maziya; Mandla Mbili; Nozizwe Mbombo; Vytjie Mentor; Hlengiwe Mgabadeli; Zakhele Mkhize; Andrew Mlangeni; Bafunani Mnguni; Bheki Mnyandu; Lewele Modisenyane; Ronald Mofokeng; Ofentse Mogale; Isaac Mogase; Ismail Mohamed; Rubben Mohlaloga; Aubrey Mokoena; Dan Montsitsi; Kay Moonsamy; Dimakatso Morobi; Storey Morutoa; Kgoloko Morwamoche; Bahlakoana Mosala; Linda Moss; Maxwell Moss; Dorothy Motubatse-Hounkpatin; Mandisi Mpahlwa; Sithole Mshudulu; Ben Mthembu; Eric Mtshali; Sydney Mufamadi; Monontsi Mzondeki; Zipporah Nawa; Rita Ndzanga; Andries Nel; Mdudu Nene; Nhlanhla Nene; Wilma Newhoudt-Druchen; Elizabeth Ngaleka; Doris Ngcengwane; Eugene Ngcobo; James Ngculu; Joyce Ngele; Winnie Ngwenya; Sisa Njikelana; Makho Njobe; Enyinna Nkem-Abonta; Constance Nkuna; Robert Nogumla; Sisi Ntombela; Bongi Ntuli; Maria Ntuli; Richard Ntuli; Tinyiko Nwamitwa-Shilubana; Doreen Nxumalo; Samuel Nxumalo; Jomo Nyambi; Lewis Nzimande; Danny Olifant; Godfrey Oliphant; Gert Oosthuizen; Randy Pieterse; Mildred Ramakaba-Lesiea; Mewa Ramgobin; Dorothy Ramodibe; Cecilia Ramotsamai; Solly Rasmeni; Lanval Reid; Cassim Saloojee; Johnny Schippers; Greg Schneemann; Manie Schoeman; Mokgothu Seadimo; Molefi Sefularo; Priscilla Sekgobela; Connie September; Susan Shabangu; Pat Sibande; Jonas Sibanyoni; Sipho Siboza; Richard Sikakane; Lindiwe Sisulu; Dumisani Sithole; Windvoël Skhosana; Zola Skweyiya; Vincent Smith; Bangilizwe Solo; Gassan Solomon; Rose Sonto; Jabu Sosibo; Maggie Sotyu; Enver Surty; Barbara Thomson; Bulelwa Tinto; Manana Tlake; Jack Tolo; Lechesa Tsenoli; Pam Tshwete; Randall van den Heever; Annelizé van Wyk; Sifanelo Vundisa; Everson Xolo; Tony Yengeni; Langa Zita	–	1: Johannes Phungula	85: Salam Abram; Sphetho Asiya; Obed Bapela; Phumzile Bhengu-Kombe; Beauty Dambuza; Pamela Daniels; Rob Davies; Nkosazana Dlamini-Zuma; Ivy Gcina; Ndaba Gcwabaza; Frene Ginwala; John Gogotya; John Gomomo; Mbulelo Goniwe; Carl Greyling; Bertha Gxowa; Fatima Hajaig; Derek Hanekom; Nomatyala Hangana; Patekile Holomisa; Kgotso Khumalo; Nthabiseng Khunou; Lydia Komape-Ngwenya; Ncumisa Kondlo; Zoliswa Kota-Mpeko; Mpho Lekgoro; Albertina Luthuli; Louisa Mabe; Rejoice Mabudafhasi; Mighty Madasa; Andrew Madella; Nozizwe Madlala-Routledge; Ruth Magau; Nomhle Mahlawe; Farida Mahomed; Sophie Maine; Joe Malahlela; Salie Manie; Ben Martins; Tlokwe Maserumule; Nomvula Mathibela; Maggie Maunye; Baleka Mbete; Shepherd Mdladlana; Violet Meruti; Bongani Mkongi; Phumzile Mlambo-Ngcuka; Monako Moatshe; Pinky Mokoto; Christopher Molefe; Jabu Moleketi; Arthur Moloto; Oupa Monareng; Nathi Mthethwa; Beatrice Ngcobo; Wilson Ngcobo; Vusi Nhlapo; Dumisile Nhlengethwa; Mwelo Nonkonyana; Charles Nqakula; Benjamin Ntuli; Roy Padayachie; Aziz Pahad; Essop Pahad; Naledi Pandor; George Phadagi; John Phala; Bheki Radebe; Jeff Radebe; Kiki Rwexana; Joseph Selau; Buyelwa Sonjica; Jean Swanson-Jacobs; Elizabeth Thabethe; Thandi Tobias; Tshoganetso Tongwane; Manto Tshabalala-Msimang; Tovhowani Tshivhase; Ben Turok; Ntombikayise Twala; Ismail Vadi; Sue van der Merwe; Marthinus van Schalkwyk; Lulama Xingwana; Zeblon Zulu
Democratic Alliance	22: Sheila Camerer; Ryan Coetzee; Ian Davidson; Anchen Dreyer; Mike Ellis; Stuart Farrow; Sandy Kalyan; Dianne Kohler Barnard; Tony Leon; Shelley Loe; Mark Lowe; Gareth Morgan; Pierre Rabie; Hendrik Schmidt; James Selfe; Dene Smuts; Martin Stephens; Butch Steyn; Paul Swart; Eddie Trent; Kraai van Niekerk; Mike Waters	12: Sakkie Blanché; Willem Doman; Roy Jankielsohn; Ryno King; Les Labuschagne; James Masango; Karel Minnie; Maans Nel; Sydney Opperman; Rafeek Shah; Marius Swart; Manie van Dyk	1: Joe Seremane	12: George Boinamo; Sandra Botha; Tertius Delport; Douglas Gibson; Len Joubert; Isaac Julies; Donald Lee; Kobus Marais; Janet Semple; Mpowele Swathe; Désirée van der Walt; Hilda Weber
Inkatha Freedom Party	–	12: Mfuniselwa Bhengu; Inka Mars; Albert Mncwango; Alfred Mpontshane; Ruth Rabinowitz; Usha Roopnarain; Sybil Seaton; Mabalana Sibuyana; Peter Smith; Koos van der Merwe; Connie Zikalala; Nhlanhla Zulu	–	11: Hennie Bekker; Bhekizwe Biyela; Mangosuthu Buthelezi; Eugenia Chang; Bonginkosi Dhlamini; Eric Lucas; Velaphi Ndlovu; Ben Skosana; Ellis Vezi; Suzanne Vos; Connie Zikalala
Independent Democrats	1: Chris Wang	3: Vincent Gore; Lance Greyling; Avril Harding	–	2: Florence Batyi; Patricia de Lille
United Democratic Movement	–	2: Nonhlanhla Nkabinde; Sylvia Sigcau	–	4: Jackson Bici; Bantu Holomisa; Ntopile Kganyago; George Madikiza
African Christian Democratic Party	–	3: Hendry Cupido; Kenneth Meshoe; Steven Swart	–	1: Cheryllyn Dudley
Freedom Front Plus	–	4: Pieter Groenewald; Corné Mulder; Pieter Mulder; Willie Spies	–	–
National Democratic Convention	–	–	–	4: Makhosazana Mdlalose; Vincent Ngema; Chris Ngiba; Gavin Woods
Pan Africanist Congress of Azania	–	2: Themba Godi; Motsoko Pheko	–	1: Mofihli Likotsi
United Christian Democratic Party	–	1: Bafitlhile Pule	–	2: Paul Ditshetelo; Sipho Mfundisi
Minority Front	–	–	–	2: Royith Bhoola; Margaret Rajbally
United Independent Front	–	–	–	2: Nomakhaya Mdaka; Zintle Ndlazi
G Azanian People's Organisation	–	–	–	1: Pandelani Nefolovhodwe
Federation of Democrats	–	1: Louis Green	–	–
Progressive Independent Movement	–	–	–	1: Craig Morkel
United Party of South Africa	–	1: Stan Simmons	–	–
Total	229	41	2	128
Total	57.3%	10.3%	0.5%	32.0%

28 November 2006 vote in the National Council of Provinces
Party	Voted for	Voted against	Abstained	Absent (Did not vote)
G African National Congress	33: Freddie Adams; Danie Botha; Beauty Dlulane; Dumisane Gamede; Motsamai Goeieman; Peggy Hollander; Zolile Kolweni; Sisi Mabe; Novello Mack; Nomopo Madlala-Magubane; Atwell Manyosi; Joyce Masilo; Helen Matlanyane; Faith Mazibuko; Buti Mkhaliphi; Dickson Mkono; Lameck Mokoena; Abram Moseki; Zwelifile Ntuli; Florence Nyanda; Mildred Oliphant; Tutu Ralane; Marius Robertsen; Tsietsi Setona; Sicelo Shiceka; Joel Sibiya; Elliot Sogoni; Mohamed Sulliman; Reseriti Tau; Malesane Themba; Bagudi Tolo; Cornelis van Rooyen; Victor Windvoël	1: Abbie Mchunu	–	3: Mininwa Mahlangu; Peter Moatshe; Nosipho Ntwanambi
Democratic Alliance	3: Gregory Krumbock; Denise Robinson; Juanita Terblanche	5: Leon Fielding; Wilhelm le Roux; Motlatjo Thetjeng; Watty Watson; Darryl Worth	–	2: Sherry Chen; Helen Lamoela
Inkatha Freedom Party	–	1: Jeanette Vilakazi	–	1: Abraham Mzizi
Freedom Front Plus	–	1: Frederick van Heerden	–	–
Independent Democrats	–	–	1: Lillian Ntembe	–
United Christian Democratic Party	–	1: Johannes Tlhagale	–	–
United Democratic Movement	–	1: Agnes Qikani	–	–
United Independent Front	–	1: Neville Hendrickse	–	–
Total	36	11	1	6
Total	66.7%	20.4%	1.9%	11.1%

The bill was hailed by gay and liberal activists as another step forward out of the country's apartheid past, while at the same time some clergy and traditional leaders described it as "the saddest day in our 12 years of democracy". Islamic leader Sheikh Sharif Ahmed called the bill a "foreign action imposed on Africa". The law made South Africa the fifth country in the world to legalise same-sex marriage after the Netherlands, Belgium, Spain and Canada. The first couple to wed, Vernon Gibbs and Tony Halls, did so in George, the following day, 1 December 2006. They encountered no problems, and a second couple married later that day in the same location. In 2013, South Africa's first traditional same-sex wedding was held for Tshepo Cameron Modisane and Thoba Calvin Sithole in KwaDukuza.

In a 2007 paper, constitutional scholar Pierre de Vos questioned the notion that the legalisation of same-sex marriage in South Africa represented the pinnacle of the human rights struggle of members of the LGBT community. He argued that those who are not involved in long-term monogamous relationships and those who cannot come out of the closet and get married because of the threat of victimisation may not see any benefit from the legislation. In January 2024, Jacob Zuma, who had served as president between 2009 and 2018, said his newly-formed uMkhonto we Sizwe party would overhaul laws permitting same-sex marriage if elected in the 2024 election. Zuma had previously stated in an interview with The Guardian in 2012 that he opposed repealing the Civil Union Act.

=== Proposed uniform marriage bill ===
In October 2020, the Department of Home Affairs confirmed plans to introduce a new draft marriage policy in South Africa, reconciling the diverse marriage laws into a single piece of legislation "that will enable South Africans of different sexual orientation, religious and cultural persuasions to conclude legal marriages", but indicated that the process had been delayed due to the COVID-19 pandemic. In January 2021, the South African Law Reform Commission issued a 300-page discussion paper, offering a number of proposals and alternatives. The commission called for public comments on its discussion paper. The proposed changes include reforms introducing a default property system, as spouses who have not entered into a formal marriage have no statutory rights to share in property which was amassed during the relationship, as well as the legalisation of polyandry. A draft bill was approved by the Cabinet, and published in the Government Gazette on 7 July 2023. The period for written submission was open until 31 August 2023. The bill was tabled in Parliament in December 2023, and was open for public comments until 17 May 2024. Some religious groups have made same-sex marriage the main focus of their opposition to the bill.

== Law ==
Same-sex sexual activity legal Same-sex marriage Limited recognition (foreign residency rights) No recognition of same-sex couples Same-sex sexual activity illegal Prison but not enforced Prison Death penalty on books but not enforced Enforced death penalty

=== Summary ===
Three laws currently provide for the status of marriage in South Africa. These are the Marriage Act (Act 25 of 1961), which provides for civil or religious opposite-sex marriages; the Recognition of Customary Marriages Act (Act 120 of 1998), which provides for the civil registration of marriages solemnised according to the traditions of indigenous groups; and the Civil Union Act (Act 17 of 2006), (Note: In the official languages of South Africa: Zulu: uMthetho wokuHlanganiswa kwaBantu ngokoBuhlobo; Xhosa: uMthetho woMtshato waBantu beSini esiFanayo; Afrikaans: Wet op Burgerlike Verbintenisse, pronounced [vɛt ɔp ˈbœrgərləkə fərˈbəntənəsə]; Northern Sotho: Molao wa Kopantšho ya baratani ya Semolao; Tswana: Molao wa Dikgolagano tsa Selegae; Sotho: Molao wa Dikopanelo tsa Mmuso; Tsonga: Nawu wa Vukati bya Vaaki; Swazi: uMtsetfo weMshado weBantfu beBulili Lobufananako; Venda: Mulayo wa u Ṱanganyiswa; Southern Ndebele: mThetho wobuLili buNye) which provides for opposite-sex and same-sex civil marriages, religious marriages and civil partnerships. A person may only be married under one of these laws at any given time.

Couples marrying in terms of the Civil Union Act may choose whether their union is registered as a marriage or a civil partnership. In either case, the legal consequences are identical to those of a marriage under the Marriage Act, except for such changes as are required by the context. Any reference to marriage in any law, including the common law, is deemed to include a marriage or civil partnership in terms of the Civil Union Act; similarly, any reference to husband, wife or spouse in any law is deemed to include a reference to a spouse or civil partner in terms of the Civil Union Act.

=== Restrictions ===
The parties to a marriage or civil partnership must be 18 or older and not already married or civilly partnered. The prohibited degrees of affinity and consanguinuity that apply under the Marriage Act also apply under the Civil Union Act; thus a person may not marry his or her direct ancestor or descendant, sibling, uncle or aunt, niece or nephew, or the ancestor or descendant of an ex-spouse. The Recognition of Customary Marriages Act, 1998 allows, in limited circumstances, a man to marry multiple wives. A person married under the Civil Union Act may not enter into marriage with a second partner until the existing marriage is dissolved.

=== Solemnisation ===
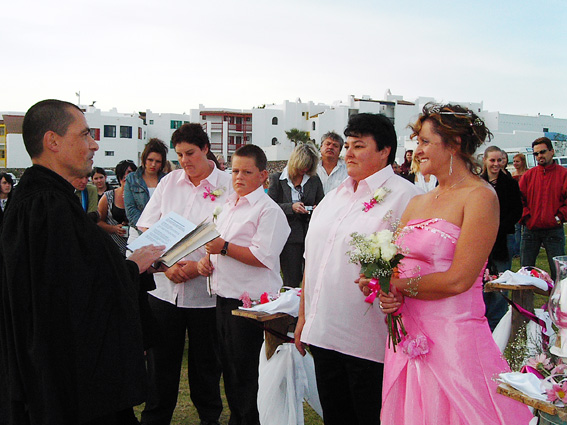
A same-sex marriage in Langebaan, 2007

Marriages and civil partnerships must be solemnised by an authorised marriage officer. Government officials (primarily magistrates and Home Affairs civil servants) who are appointed as marriage officers under the Marriage Act are also able to solemnise marriages in terms of the Civil Union Act. Religious leaders may also be appointed as marriage officers under the Civil Union Act, but religious leaders appointed under the Marriage Act are not automatically able to solemnise marriages in terms of the Civil Union Act.

Originally, government marriage officers who had an objection of conscience to solemnising same-sex marriages or civil partnerships were exempted from doing so if they noted their objection in writing to the Minister of Home Affairs. Several constitutional scholars argued that this provision was unconstitutional, calling it "state-sanctioned discrimination" in violation of the right to equality. This provision did not apply to religious marriage officers because they are in any case not obliged to solemnise a marriage that would violate the doctrines of their religion. In July 2017, more than a decade after same-sex marriage was legalised in South Africa, LGBT newspaper Mambaonline reported that 421 out of 1,130 marriage officers in South Africa were exempt from performing same-sex marriages, mostly in the Eastern Cape, the Free State and Mpumalanga. Media outlets reported couples being denied marriage licenses in Pretoria, Gqeberha, Bloemfontein, East London, Alberton, oThongathi, and Richards Bay. A bill to repeal the exemption was introduced by MP Deidre Carter in January 2018. Speaking in the National Assembly in December that year, she stated:

It limits the right of same-sex partners to enter into a [marriage], and this limitation cannot be justified in an open and democratic society. It also contravenes Chapter 10 of the Constitution, that our public administration must be governed by the democratic values and principles enshrined in the Constitution; that services must be provided impartially, fairly, equitably and without bias.

Parliament amended the bill to allow officials who had previously refused to marry same-sex couples to continue doing so for a transitional period of two years. This gave the Ministry of Home Affairs time to implement the new policy. However, new officials are not permitted to opt out at all. Branches with officials who chose to opt out during the two-year period were required to have another official available to perform same-sex marriages. The legislation passed the National Assembly on 6 December 2018—with only the African Christian Democratic Party, the National Freedom Party and the African Independent Congress opposing it—and the National Council of Provinces on 1 July 2020 by a 33–5 vote. It was signed into law by President Cyril Ramaphosa on 22 October 2020 as the Civil Union Amendment Act, 2020.

=== Recognition of foreign relationships ===
The Civil Union Act makes no explicit provisions for the recognition of foreign same-sex unions. As a consequence of the extension of the common-law definition of marriage, and based on the principle of lex loci celebrationis, a foreign same-sex marriage is recognised as a marriage in South African law. However, the status of foreign forms of partnership other than marriage, such as civil unions or domestic partnerships, is not clear. In a 2010 divorce case, the Western Cape High Court recognised the validity of a British civil partnership as equivalent to a marriage or civil partnership in South African law.

== Historical and customary recognition ==
Historically, Sotho society recognised motswalle relationships formed between women during adolescence. Often, a motswalle relationship was acknowledged publicly with a ritual feast and with the community fully aware of the women's commitment to one another. Motswalle relationships differed from same-sex marriages in the way they are commonly defined in Western legal systems. Women in motswalle relationships "marr[ied] men and conform[ed], or appear[ed] to conform, to gender expectations", and did not have a different social identity even though they were in committed relationships with other women. Women in motswalle relationships also differed from the Western perspective of heterosexual female friends. Researcher William J. Spurlin wrote that "it is important not to simply translate into English [the] use of the Sesotho word motswalle [...] as lesbian." Nevertheless, Spurlin stated that "it might be possible to place motswalle relationships on the lesbian continuum to discuss, debate, and imagine them theoretically as possible sites of lesbian existence, given the close emotional and intimate bonds between the women, but with the stipulation that the relationships not be reduced to Western understandings of lesbian."

Female same-sex marriages (Northern Sotho: go nyalela mosadi lapa; Venda: u malela musadzi muta) are practiced among the Pedi and Venda. However, this is not perceived as homosexual as understood from a Western perspective, but rather as a way for families without sons to keep their inheritance within the family. The couples are considered married, though are referred to as "mother-in-law" and "daughter-in-law". The female "husband" (the "mother-in-law") carries on the family name and property, while the female "wife" (the "daughter-in-law") bears children, with the intention of having a son. For instance, the Rain Queen of the Lobedu is generally prohibited from having a male husband and is required instead to take a "wife". South African anthropologist Hugh Stayt reported in 1931 that Venda women who had male husbands could acquire their own "wives" by paying a bride price in cattle, just as men did:

[Venda] women in a position of authority, such as petty chiefs or witch-doctors, who have been able to accumulate the necessary wealth, often obtain wives in this way, even though they may be themselves married in the ordinary way. A woman may bring three wives to live with her at her own home... These women are really in the position of servants and are obliged to do all the menial work; they may be given to different men for the purpose of obtaining children, but these men, not having paid the mamalo [Venda word for "bride price"] for them, have no legal rights over them or their children.

Contemporary oral evidence suggests that same-sex relationships were "common" and "prevalent" among Ndebele, Tsonga, Xhosa and Zulu miners in South Africa in the early 20th century. In 1912, Swiss-born missionary Henri-Alexandre Junod described "elaborately organized homosexual relationships among miners". The younger partner, known as nkhonsthana in the Tsonga language (which entered Zulu as inkotshane), was "used to satisfy the lust" of the older partner (nima). "He received a wedding feast, and his elder brother received a bride price." Junod described a dance in which the nkhonsthana donned wooden or cloth breasts, which they removed when paid to do so by their nima. A Tsonga local told Junod at the time: "Each of these nima would propose a boy for himself, not only for the sake of washing his dishes, because in the evening the boy would have to go and join [him] on his bed. In that way he had become a wife. The husband would make love with him. The husband would penetrate his manhood between the boy's thighs. Fidelity was expected, and jealousy on occasion led to violence." He added that male couples "would quarrel just as husbands and wives do", and when asked whether the nkhonsthana wished to become someone's partner, he replied, "Yes, for the sake of security, for the acquisition of property and for the fun itself." This practice gradually disappeared as South Africa became more modernized and exposed to Western culture and homophobia in the 20th century.

== Statistics ==
According to the South African Government, over 3,000 same-sex couples had married in South Africa by mid-2010. Statistics South Africa reported that a total of 3,327 marriages and civil partnerships were registered under the Civil Union Act up to the end of 2011; however, this figure only reflects marriages in which at least one of the spouses is a South African citizen or permanent resident. Furthermore, not all marriages under the Civil Union Act are between partners of the same sex, though most opposite-sex couples continue to marry under the Marriage Act, 1961. Lonely Planet has named Cape Town one of the world's top 10 "gay wedding destinations". A 2025 report showed that 1.4% of South African men and 1.0% of women were in cohabiting same-sex relationships, which was comparable to Australia, Canada and the United States. Men in same-sex unions were younger than men in heterosexual unions, but there was little age difference among women. Additionally, the odds of being in a same-sex union were 1.4 to 1.5 times higher among White South Africans, though Black South Africans still accounted for approximately 60% of same-sex unions.

22,214 marriages and civil partnerships were registered under the Civil Union Act up to the end of 2024. The Statistics South Africa data are further broken down by province and year; they show that the majority of same-sex marriages were registered in Gauteng (9,495), followed by the Western Cape (6,192), KwaZulu-Natal (2,951), the Eastern Cape (852), the Northern Cape (651), the Free State (566), North West (412), Mpumalanga (338), and Limpopo (233). In addition, 70 unions were performed in embassies and consulates outside of South Africa, and the location of 454 unions was unspecified.

== Religious performance ==
Most major religious organisations in South Africa do not perform or bless same-sex marriages in their places of worship. Religious institutions are not obliged to solemnise a marriage that would violate the doctrines of their faith. In 2007, the Department of Home Affairs confirmed that 17 religious denominations in South Africa had applied to officiate at same-sex marriages under the Civil Union Act.

The Anglican Church of Southern Africa does not permit same-sex marriages. Its marriage policies state that "holy matrimony is the lifelong and exclusive union between one man and one woman". The Anglican Diocese of Cape Town passed a resolution in 2009 to give pastoral guidelines to same-sex couples who live in "covenanted relationships". The resolution agreed to affirm "a pastoral response to same-sex partnerships of faithful commitment in our parish families." In 2016, the synod voted against blessing same-sex unions. The decision split the Church, with several dioceses deciding to nonetheless proceed with the blessing of same-sex relationships, notably the Diocese of Saldanha Bay. Archbishop Thabo Makgoba expressed disappointment with the decision not to bless same-sex unions, but added that "all is not lost", expressing hope that the matter would be debated again in the future. Former Archbishop Njongonkulu Ndungane also expressed his disappointment with the decision. Former Archbishop Desmond Tutu supported the blessing of same-sex unions. His daughter, Mpho Tutu van Furth, married her partner Marceline van Furth, a Dutch professor of medicine, in the Netherlands in 2015, though her license as a priest was withdrawn shortly after the marriage. Two Anglican pastors were also married in 2020. In early 2023, the Church once again refused to allow its clergy to bless same-sex unions, but directed the synod to develop "guidelines for providing pastoral ministry to those in same-sex relationships". In May 2024, Archbishop Makgoba released a document recommending prayers for same-sex couples, which the synod rejected in September 2024. In September 2026, the Church again rejected a motion, proposed by the Diocese of False Bay, relating to a proposed "ministry of inclusion" for parishioners in same-sex relationships.

In 2015, the General Synod of the Dutch Reformed Church voted by a 64% majority to recognise same-sex marriages, bless the relationships of same-sex couples and allow gay ministers and clergy (who are not required to be celibate). The decision applies to 9 of the 10 synods; with the Namibia Synod being excluded. The decision caused backlash and objections, resulting in it being reversed a year later. A dozen church members subsequently took the denomination to court to restore the 2015 decision. In 2019, the North Gauteng High Court reversed the decision, ruling that while religious organizations have the freedom to define marriage the 2016 decision to ban same-sex marriage was not made in accordance with the church's proper process. A freedom of conscience clause allows pastors with objections to opt out of performing same-sex weddings, so that individual pastors are free to choose whether to bless same-sex marriages. The Uniting Reformed Church in Southern Africa consists of seven regional synods. In October 2018, the southern synod, covering most of Gauteng and parts of Mpumalanga, voted to allow its clergy to perform same-sex marriages, polygamous marriages and ordain openly LGBT ministers.

In 2015, the synod of the Evangelical Lutheran Church in Southern Africa discussed same-sex unions but concluded that "a marriage is understood as a union only between a man and a woman. Furthermore the valid and unchanged position of our Church is that the blessing of same sex unions is rejected." In 2020, the Methodist Church of Southern Africa voted to allow members, including ordained clergy, to enter into same-sex unions, while retaining the denomination's teaching that marriage is a union "between a man and a woman". The Catholic Church opposes same-sex marriage and does not allow its priests to officiate at such marriages. In December 2023, the Holy See published Fiducia supplicans, a declaration allowing Catholic priests to bless couples who are not considered to be married according to church teaching, including the blessing of same-sex couples. The Archbishop of Cape Town, Stephen Brislin, issued a statement that "the document states that the blessing should not be a ritual that is issued by the bishop or by the bishops' conference or any authority. It should be left to the pastor to spontaneously give a simple blessing that could be done at a shrine, on a pilgrimage, or in a prayer group." The Southern African Catholic Bishops' Conference added that "the document offers suggestions for when and how the blessings might be given. The Southern African Catholic Bishops Conference will guide further on how such a blessing may be requested and granted to avoid the confusion the document warns against. In the meantime, the suggestions offered by the declaration may be taken as a guide with prudence."

In May 2009, a same-sex couple, Joe Singh, an Indian South African, and Wesley Nolan, were married in a traditional Hindu ceremony in Durban. The wedding was officiated by a Tamil priest, and was "complete with embossed invitations, outfits from India and [the] tying [of] a necklace with a pendant of Lord Ganesha". Local Hindu leaders criticised the wedding ceremony. The South African Tamil Federation issued a statement that "[it] do[es] not sanction such a union or the actions of the priest who sanctified it." Imam Muhsin Hendricks has performed several Muslim same-sex weddings since 1998. Some Jewish groups also perform same-sex marriages.

== Public opinion ==
Support for same-sex marriage among 18–21-year-olds according to a 2016 survey from the Varkey Foundation

A 2014 survey found that voters from the Economic Freedom Fighters (EFF) were the most supportive of same-sex marriage, followed closely by voters from the Democratic Alliance (DA) and the African National Congress (ANC).

A 2015 Ipsos poll found that 45% of South Africans supported same-sex marriage, while a further 13% supported civil unions or another form of legal recognition. A report conducted by the Human Sciences Research Council on behalf of The Other Foundation was described by some media outlets as the first "statistically sound, nationally representative data" on LGBT issues in Africa. The report found that the proportion of those who "strongly agree" with same-sex marriage had increased tenfold from 2012 to 2015, from 1.5% to 9.9%, while the proportion of people "strongly disagreeing" dropped from 48.5% to 23.4%. The total of "agree" and "strongly agree" making 36.6% (13.5% in 2012), while the "disagree" and "strongly disagree" totaled 46% (78.5% in 2012), the remaining being undecided or neutral.

A September–October 2016 survey by the Varkey Foundation found that 54% of 18–21-year-olds supported same-sex marriage in South Africa.

A May 2021 Ipsos poll showed that 59% of South Africans supported same-sex marriage, 12% supported civil partnerships but not marriage, while 15% were opposed to all legal recognition for same-sex couples, and 14% were undecided. In addition, 18% of South Africans had already attended the wedding of a same-sex couple. According to a 2023 Ipsos poll, 57% of South Africans supported same-sex marriage, while 10% supported civil unions or other types of partnerships but not marriage, 14% were undecided and 19% were opposed to all recognition for same-sex couples. A Pew Research Center poll conducted between February and May 2023 showed that 38% of South Africans supported same-sex marriage, 58% were opposed and 4% did not know or had refused to answer. When divided by age, support was highest among 18–34-year-olds at 42% and lowest among those aged 35 and above at 34%. Women (45%) were also more likely to support same-sex marriage than men (30%).

== See also ==
- LGBT rights in South Africa
- Marriage in South Africa
- Recognition of same-sex unions in Africa
