= Mchunu =

Mchunu is a surname. Notable people with the surname include:

- Khutha Mchunu (born 1997), South African rugby union player
- Senzo Mchunu (born 1958), South African Politician
- Sibongile Mchunu, South African politician
- Sipho Mchunu (born 1951), South African musician
- Thembeka Mchunu (born 1968), South African politician
- Velile (born Velile Mchunu in 1973), a South African pop singer
- Willies Mchunu (born 1948), South African politician
