= Hlengiwe =

Hlengiwe is a given name. Notable people with the name include:

- Hlengiwe Mavimbela, South African politician and teacher
- Hlengiwe Mgabadeli, South African politician
- Hlengiwe Mkhaliphi, South African politician
- Hlengiwe Mkhize (1952–2021), South African politician
- Hlengiwe Ntombela (born 1991), South African singer better known as HLE (singer)
