= Samuel Nxumalo =

Samuel Nxumalo may refer to:

- Samuel Dickenson Nxumalo (1926–2015), third and last chief minister of Gazankulu
- Samuel Nxumalo (KwaZulu-Natal politician) (born 1958), South African politician
