= Myeni =

Myeni is a South African surname. Notable people with the surname include:

- Dudu Myeni (1963–2024), South African businesswoman
- Ernest Myeni (born 1968), South African politician
- Sifiso Myeni (born 1988), South African football player
