= Busaphi Machi =

South African politician and educator

Busaphi Machi MP

Member of the National Assembly of South Africa
- Incumbent
- Assumed office 14 June 2024
- Constituency: KwaZulu-Natal

Personal details
- Party: Inkatha Freedom Party
- Profession: Educator, politician

Busaphi Eleonor Machi is a South African politician and educator who has been a Member of the National Assembly of South Africa for the Inkatha Freedom Party since June 2024.

== Background ==
Prior to becoming involved in politics, Machi worked as a teacher and then as a principal. In 2007, she was sworn in as a councillor in the Hibiscus Coast Local Municipality for the Inkatha Freedom Party. She became a councillor in the Ugu District Municipality in 2016.

== Parliamentary career ==
Machi stood as an IFP parliamentary candidate from KwaZulu-Natal in the 2024 national and provincial elections and was elected to the National Assembly of South Africa and sworn in on 14 June 2024. She is one two IFP MPs from the Ugu District; the other being Bhekizizwe Luthuli.
