= Happy Blose =

South African politician (born 1951)

Member of the National Assembly
- In office 23 April 2004 – 7 August 2006
- Constituency: KwaZulu-Natal

Personal details
- Born: 7 July 1951 (age 74)
- Citizenship: South Africa
- Party: African National Congress

Happy Mamlili Blose (born 7 July 1951) is a South African politician who represented the African National Congress (ANC) in the KwaZulu-Natal Provincial Legislature nearly continuously between 1994 and 2019. She also served a brief term in the National Assembly from 2004 to 2006. She rose to prominence during apartheid as a leader of the women's movement in the Natal Midlands, where she chaired the regional branch of the ANC Women's League in the mid-1990s.

== Early life and activism ==
Blose was born on 7 July 1951. Before entering legislative politics, she was a domestic worker. During apartheid, she was active in the women's movement in the Midlands of KwaZulu-Natal (then the Natal Province), including as a leader of the influential Midland Women's Group in the 1980s. In the early 1990s, she was a key figure in the Natal Midlands branch of the ANC Women's League, which she went on to chair.

== Legislative career: 1994–2019 ==
In South Africa's first post-apartheid elections in 1994, Blose was elected to represent the ANC in the KwaZulu-Natal Provincial Legislature. She was re-elected to her seat in 1999. However, as the end of her second term approached, the Mail & Guardian reported that Blose had been significantly demoted on the ANC's party list for the 2004 general election, to the consternation of her supporters. She was ultimately nominated for election to the National Assembly, the lower house of the national Parliament, where she represented the KwaZulu-Natal constituency from 2004 to 2006. She resigned from the assembly on 7 August 2006 and was replaced by Mandla Mbili.

Thereafter Blose returned to the KwaZulu-Natal Provincial Legislature, where she served the rest of her career. She was elected to full terms in 2009 and 2014, and also served for a period as Deputy Chairperson of Committees in the legislature. She left the provincial legislature after the 2019 general election.

== Personal life ==
One of Blose's sons, Sithembiso Mkhize, was an official in the national Department of Correctional Services; in 2003, his appointment was scrutinised by a commission of inquiry into nepotism allegations. Another of Blose's sons, Nathi, was his mother's official chauffeur while she served in the provincial legislature; they were in a car accident together in Pietermaritzburg in 2013.
