= Lindiwe Mjobo =

South African politician

Member of the National Assembly of South Africa
- In office 6 May 2009 – 28 May 2024
- Constituency: KwaZulu-Natal

Personal details
- Born: Lindiwe Ntombikayise Mjobo
- Party: African National Congress
- Profession: Politician

Lindiwe Ntombikayise Mjobo is a South African politician who served as a member of the National Assembly of South Africa from 2009 until 2024. She is a member of the African National Congress. Having entered parliament in 2009, she was re-elected two times: in 2014 and 2019 before leaving in 2024.

From 2019 to 2024, she was a member of the Portfolio Committee on Public Works and Infrastructure. During her first term in the National Assembly (2009–2014), she was a member of the Portfolio Committee On Mining, the Portfolio Committee on Sport and Recreation and the Portfolio Committee on Mineral Resources. Mjobo served on the Portfolio Committee on Science and Technology, the Portfolio Committee on Public Works and the Portfolio Committee on Labour in her second term (2014–2019).
