= Makoti Khawula =

South African politician (born 1954)

Makoti Khawula MP
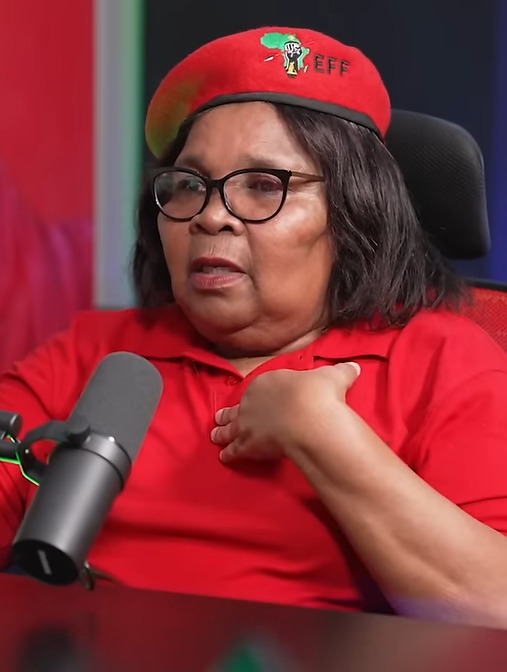
- Khawula in 2024

Member of the National Assembly of South Africa
- Incumbent
- Assumed office 21 May 2014
- Constituency: KwaZulu-Natal

Personal details
- Born: Makoti Sibongile Khawula; 7 December 1954 (age 71) Durban, Natal Province, South Africa
- Party: Economic Freedom Fighters (2013–present)
- Other political affiliations: African National Congress (1980–2013)
- Education: Durban University of Technology
- Occupation: Member of Parliament
- Profession: Politician

Makoti Sibongile Khawula (born 7 December 1954) is a South African politician and previous anti-apartheid activist from KwaZulu-Natal serving as a Member of the National Assembly of South Africa for the Economic Freedom Fighters (EFF) party since 2014. Khawula is known for her insistence on speaking Zulu in Parliament.

== Early life and education ==
Khawula was born on 7 December 1954 in Durban in the former Natal Province. She only fulfilled grade 8 while attending school. She later completed a certificate in surveying from the Durban University of Technology and a Doctors For Life course in Home Based Care.

== Political career ==
=== Political activism ===
Khawula joined the African National Congress (ANC) and participated in anti-apartheid activities in the Durban communities of Inanda and KwaMashu in the 1980s. She became an organiser for the ANC in 1990. Within the ANC, she was a member of the party's Women's League, a provincial election organiser in 1994 and a development activist for the party. She became a member of the party's Regional Executive Committee in 2013. She was also the chairperson of both the South African Communist Party (SACP) and South African National Civic Organisation (SANCO) in ward 54 of the eThekwini Metropolitan Municipality. She left the ANC in 2013 and joined the newly-formed EFF in the same year.

=== Parliamentary career ===
Khawula became a Member of Parliament on 21 May 2014 following the 2014 general elections. She was assigned to serve on the Portfolio Committee on Water and Sanitation and the Portfolio Committee on Women in the Presidency.

She soon became known for her insistence on speaking isiZulu and isiXhosa when delivering speeches or asking oratory questions. She insists that she will speak the language of her constituency. In February 2016, Khawula requested that the National Council of Provinces Chairperson Thandi Modise address her in isiZulu, as she does not understand English.

She was re-elected to a second term in the 2019 general elections and re-elected for a third term in the 2024 general elections.

== Personal life ==
In the Register of Members' Interests for 2014, Khawula declared that she received social grants for two foster children. These were not part of the 2015 register.
