= Nompumelelo Mhlongo =

South African politician (b. 1961)

Nompumelelo Mhlongo MP

Member of the National Assembly of South Africa
- Incumbent
- Assumed office 14 June 2024
- Constituency: KwaZulu-Natal

Personal details
- Born: 15 January 1961 (age 65)
- Party: Inkatha Freedom Party
- Profession: Politician

Nompumelelo Happiness Mhlongo (born 15 January 1961) is a South African politician, who was elected to the National Assembly of South Africa in the 2024 general election as a member of the Inkatha Freedom Party.

In parliament, Mhlongo is a member of the Portfolio Committee on Mineral and Petroleum Resources and an alternate member of the Portfolio Committee on Health.
