= Mandlenkosi Mabika =

South African politician

Mandlenkosi Mabika MP

Member of the National Assembly of South Africa
- Incumbent
- Assumed office 22 May 2019
- In office 21 May 2014 – 1 April 2019

Personal details
- Born: Mandlenkosi Sicelo Mabika
- Party: Democratic Alliance (2019–present)
- Other political affiliations: National Freedom Party (2011–2019)
- Education: Rand Afrikaans University; University of Durban-Westville; University of Stellenbosch
- Occupation: Member of Parliament
- Profession: Politician

Mandlenkosi Sicelo Mabika is a South African politician who was first elected to the National Assembly in 2014 as a member of the National Freedom Party. He joined the Democratic Alliance in March 2019 and was re-elected to the National Assembly at that year's election in May.

== Education ==
Mabika holds a teachers' diploma from the Rand Afrikaans University, a personal management certificate, a Bachelor of Arts degree from the University of Durban-Westville, and a Bachelor of Education Honours from Stellenbosch University.

== Political career ==
Mabika joined the National Freedom Party shortly after its founding in January 2011 and was appointed a district secretary for the party. In December of that same year, he was voted in as the party's deputy national chairperson. At the 2014 general election, Mabika won a seat in the National Assembly. He was named to the National Assembly's committees on environmental affairs, economic development, sport and recreation, and transport.

In 2015, he was expelled from the NFP over claims of bringing the party into disrepute. He was reinstated later on. In August 2016, Mabika and fellow NFP MP Maliyakhe Shelembe were suspended from the party for refusing to co-operate with investigators investigating the party's failure to participate in the municipal elections held that month. Both were later reinstated.

In March 2019, two months prior to that year's general election in May, Mabika and Shelembe joined the Democratic Alliance. They were both welcomed into the party by the party leader, Mmusi Maimane. Mabika and Shelembe were also placed on the DA's national list for the election and were elected to return to the National Assembly as DA MPs. His constituency area is Zululand North.

In the 2020 Register of Members’ Interests, Mabika declared that he has several property interests: 16 flats in Manguzi and cottages with 14 rooms in Hlazane in northern KwaZulu-Natal.

DA leader John Steenhuisen appointed Mabika as an Additional Member of the Small Business Development portfolio of his shadow cabinet on 21 April 2023.

== Personal life ==
Mabika is married to Slindie.
