= Bangilizwe Solo =

South African politician (born 1953)

Member of the National Assembly
- In office June 1999 – May 2009

Personal details
- Born: 22 November 1953 (age 72)
- Citizenship: South Africa
- Party: African National Congress

Bangilizwe Mlindiwekhaya Solo (born 22 November 1953) is a South African politician who represented the African National Congress (ANC) in the National Assembly from 1999 to 2009. In 2006, he pled guilty to defrauding Parliament in connection with the Travelgate scam.

== Legislative career ==
Solo was born on 22 November 1953. He was elected to the National Assembly in the 1999 general election, representing the ANC in Gauteng, and he was elected to a second term in the 2004 general election. During his first term, in June 2002, opposition MP Cheryllyn Dudley lodged a sexual harassment complaint against him. Dudley had recently questioned Deputy President Jacob Zuma about a sex education initiative, and she said that Solo accosted her on her way out of the assembly and asked her to "show him oral sex". The following week, Solo addressed the house to say that he apologised "if he had offended anyone"; Dudley said that this sounded "more like excuses" than an apology but that she had accepted it to end the "tedious" matter.

== Travelgate ==
In January 2005, during an early stage of the Travelgate scandal, Solo was served with a summons to repay a sizeable amount in charges to a private travel agency which MPs used to claim air-travel benefits for work-related travel. He was subsequently charged with having defrauded Parliament by submitting false travel invoices. In October 2006, he signed a plea deal with the Scorpions, in terms of which he pled guilty to fraud in the Cape High Court. The fraud concerned an amount of R151,000 in service benefits and he was sentenced to pay a fine of R100,000 or serve five years' imprisonment; he was also sentenced to a mandatory five years' imprisonment, suspended conditionally. He elected to pay the fine.
