= Beauty Zibula =

South African politician (1961–2026)

Member of the National Assembly of South Africa from KwaZulu-Natal
- In office 22 May 2019 – 28 May 2024

Personal details
- Born: 1961 KwaMashu, South Africa
- Died: 14 March 2026 (aged 65) Durban, South Africa
- Party: African National Congress

Beauty Thulani Zibula (1961 – 14 March 2026) was a South African politician who was a member of the National Assembly of South Africa. She was a member of the African National Congress.

== Background ==
Beauty Thulani Zibula was born in KwaMashu, north of Durban, in 1961. She died at a hospital in Durban on 14 March 2026, at the age of 65.

== Parliamentary career ==
Zibula was a parliamentary candidate for the African National Congress in the 2019 general elections. She was the 16th candidate on the ANC's list in KwaZulu-Natal. She was elected to the National Assembly as the ANC won 24 list seats in the province. As a member of the National Assembly, she was a member of the Standing Committee on Public Accounts.

In the 2019 Register of Members' Interest, Zibula disclosed that as chair of the Clothing Manufactory Chamber of the National Bargaining Council, she received R13 935.48.

Zibula did not stand for reelection in 2024 and left parliament.
