= Fikile Khumalo =

South African politician

Member of the National Assembly of South Africa
- In office 23 June 2020 – 28 May 2024
- Preceded by: Bavelile Hlongwa
- In office 6 May 2009 – 6 May 2014

Personal details
- Born: Fikile Eunice Khumalo
- Party: African National Congress
- Profession: Politician

Fikile Eunice Khumalo is a South African politician who served as an African National Congress Member of Parliament (MP) from 2009 until 2014 and again from 2020 until 2024.

== Parliamentary career ==
=== First term in parliament ===
Khumalo was elected to the National Assembly of South Africa in the 2009 parliamentary election from the ANC's KwaZulu-Natal list. In the Fourth Parliament (2009–2014), she was a member of the Committee On Private Members' Legislative Proposals And Special Petitions, the Portfolio Committee On Trade and Industry and the Portfolio Committee on Social Development and was the constituency contact for the ANC's Nquthu constituency office. Prior to the 2014 elections, Khumalo was not included on the ANC's parliamentary lists. She was the 58th candidate on the ANC list for the KwaZulu-Natal Legislature. The ANC won only 52 seats in the provincial legislature, declining Khumalo a seat. She did not return to parliament.

=== Second term in parliament ===
In 2019 Khumalo stood for the National Assembly again as a candidate on the ANC's KwaZulu-Natal list. She was not elected to parliament at the election. The Deputy Minister of Mineral Resources and Energy, Bavelile Hlongwa, died in a car accident in September 2019. The ANC appointed Khumalo to take up Hlongwa's seat in parliament and she was sworn in as an MP on 23 June 2020. She was appointed to serve on the Portfolio Committee on Transport and the Portfolio Committee on Public Works.

Khumalo was not included on any ANC candidate lists for the 2024 general election and left parliament.
