= Nicole Bollman =

South African politician

Nicole Bollman MP

Member of the National Assembly of South Africa
- Incumbent
- Assumed office 14 June 2024
- Constituency: KwaZulu-Natal

Personal details
- Born: Durban
- Party: Democratic Alliance
- Profession: Politician

Nicole Jane Bollman is a South African politician and a Member of Parliament (MP) for the Democratic Alliance (DA). She was elected to the National Assembly of South Africa for the KwaZulu-Natal in the 2024 South African general election, where she was 83rd on the national party list.

== Early life ==
Bollman was born and raised in Durban.

== Career ==
Bollman was a councillor in Durban North. She represented Ward 35 from 2020 to 2024.

== Personal life ==
Bollman is a single mother of two children.

== See also ==
- List of National Assembly members of the 28th Parliament of South Africa
