= Thandiwe Zungu =

South African politician (born 1960)

Member of the National Assembly of South Africa
- In office 22 May 2019 – 28 May 2024

Personal details
- Born: Thandiwe Rose Marry Zungu; 9 August 1960 (age 65)
- Party: African National Congress
- Education: Durban University of Technology
- Profession: Politician

Thandiwe Rose Marry Zungu (born 9 August 1960) is a South African politician and a former Member of Parliament (MP) for the African National Congress from KwaZulu-Natal.

== Early life and education ==
Zungu was born on 9 August 1960. She holds a certificate in management and a certificate in leadership from the Durban University of Technology.

== Political career ==
A member of the African National Congress, she was elected as the treasurer of the party's Moses Mabhida region in 1989. In 2008 she was elected as a member of the ANC's regional executive committee and regional working committee. Zungu became a member of the provincial executive committee of the African National Congress Women's League in 2017.

=== Parliament ===
Zungu stood as an ANC parliamentary candidate from KwaZulu-Natal in the 2019 national elections and was elected to the National Assembly and sworn in on 22 May 2019.

On 27 June 2019, Zungu became a member of the National Assembly's Portfolio Committee on International Relations and Cooperation. She was named to the Joint Standing Committee on Defence on 5 September 2019. She did not stand in the 2024 general election and left parliament as a consequence.
