= Delisile Ntshaba =

South African politician

Delisile Ntshaba MP

Member of the National Assembly of South Africa
- Incumbent
- Assumed office 25 June 2024
- Constituency: KwaZulu-Natal

Personal details
- Party: uMkhonto weSizwe
- Profession: Politician

Delisile Ntshaba is a South African politician and a Member of the National Assembly of South Africa for the uMkhonto weSizwe party.

Ntshaba was elected to the National Assembly in the 2024 general election. Following her swearning-in, reports emerged that Ntshaba was party president Jacob Zuma's traditional healer. The MK provincial spokesperson in KwaZulu-Natal could neither confirm nor deny that she was a traditional healer.
