= Inka Mars =

German-born South African anti-apartheid activist and politician

Member of the National Assembly of South Africa
- In office 1994–2009

Personal details
- Born: Inka Deppisch; 7 August 1928 Hamburg, Weimar Republic
- Died: 18 October 2017 (aged 89) Durban, KwaZulu-Natal, South Africa
- Party: Inkatha Freedom Party
- Spouse: Dr Paul Ernst Mars
- Children: 2

Inka Mars (née Deppisch; 7 August 1928 – 18 October 2017) was a German-born South African anti-apartheid activist and politician who served as a Member of Parliament (MP) for the Inkatha Freedom Party from 1994 to 2009. Prior to her election to parliament, she worked for the Red Cross.

== Early life ==
Inka Deppisch was born on 7 August 1928 in Hamburg in the Weimar Republic. She was 11 years old when World War II began and spent the duration of the war in Hamburg, which was bombed by the Allies. After the war, she moved to London in the United Kingdom and worked as an au pair for a Jewish couple. She met Paul Ernst Mars, a medical doctor, in London and they subsequently married. They moved to South Africa in 1951 during the early years of apartheid. Mars opposed apartheid and was outraged by the closure of missionary schools and the implementation of Bantu education. She and her husband then decided to move back to the UK because of apartheid. They returned to South Africa after a year or so.

== Career ==
Mars met Mangosuthu Buthelezi in the 1970s while she was working for Red Cross in Zululand. They soon became friends and Mars's husband was Buthelezi's personal doctor until his death in 1995. When Buthelezi established the Inkatha Freedom Party in 1975, she became a party member. Mars worked as head of the Red Cross in the Natal Province. During the drought of 1980, which devastated large parts of Zululand, Mars led a private drought relief effort headed by the Red Cross. When Tropical Storm Domoina struck the region in 1984, Mars directed the emergency teams of doctors and the distribution of medical supplies, food and drinking water in the region. She later became head of the Red Cross in South Africa.

In 1990, she became a full-time participate of the Convention for a Democratic South Africa (CODESA), representing the IFP. Mars was elected as an IFP member of parliament in the newly established National Assembly in 1994. During her time in parliament, she worked on the Children's Act, 2005 for five years, which was successfully passed by both houses of parliament and signed into law. The act made legal provision for the care and protection of children in South Africa. She voted against the Civil Union Act, 2006 which legalised Same-sex marriage in South Africa.

Mars retired from politics at the 2009 general election.

== Death ==
Mars died on 18 October 2017 in Durban. She had been hospitalised with a lung complaint. She was 89 years old. Mars is survived by her two children. IFP President Mangosuthu Buthelezi paid tribute to her.
