= Sanele Mwali =

South African politician

Sanele Mwali MP

Member of the National Assembly of South Africa
- Incumbent
- Assumed office 25 June 2024
- Constituency: KwaZulu-Natal

Personal details
- Party: uMkhonto weSizwe
- Profession: Politician

Sanele Greegory Mwali is a South African politician who serves as a Member of the National Assembly of South Africa for the uMkhonto weSizwe party. He was sworn into office on 25 June 2024. He sits on the Standing Committee on Auditor General, the Standing Committee on Appropriations, and the Standing Committee on Finance.
