= Jabulile Mkhwanazi =

South African politician (b. 1975)

Member of the National Assembly of South Africa
- In office 22 May 2019 – 28 May 2024
- Constituency: KwaZulu-Natal

Personal details
- Born: Jabulile Cynthia Nightingale Mkhwanazi; 27 February 1975 (age 51)
- Party: African National Congress

Jabulile Cynthia Nightingale Mkhwanazi (born 27 February 1975) is a South African African National Congress politician who served as a Member of the National Assembly of South Africa from KwaZulu-Natal from 2019 until 2024.

== Political career ==
Mkhwanazi served as an African National Congress proportional representation councillor (PR) in the Newcastle Local Municipality.

=== Politics ===
For the general election on May 8, 2019, Mkhwanazi was the twelfth candidate on the ANC's list of National Assembly candidates from KwaZulu-Natal. The ANC won 24 regional seats in KwaZulu-Natal and Mkhwanazi was elected to the National Assembly. She was sworn into office on May 22, during the first sitting of the National Assembly following the election. Mkhwanazi became a member of the Portfolio Committee on Public Enterprises on 27 June 2019.

In 2019, she had an 88% committee attendance rate as a Member of Parliament (14 meetings out of 16) and in 2020, she had a 92% committee attendance rate (24 meetings out of 26).

Mkhwanazi did not stand in the 2024 general election and left parliament.
