= Sibusiso Mdabe =

South African politician

Member of the National Assembly of South Africa
- In office 22 May 2019 – 28 May 2024
- Constituency: KwaZulu-Natal

Personal details
- Born: Sibusiso Welcome Mdabe
- Party: African National Congress

Sibusiso Welcome Mdabe is a South African politician who was elected to the National Assembly of South Africa in the 2019 national election as a member of the African National Congress. He had previously served as the mayor of the iLembe District Municipality in KwaZulu-Natal and as the provincial chairperson of the South African Local Government Association.

In parliament, he served on the Portfolio Committee on Employment and Labour.
