= Duduzile Sibiya =

South African politician (born 1957)

Member of the National Assembly of South Africa
- In office 22 May 2019 – 28 May 2024
- Constituency: KwaZulu-Natal
- In office 2011–2014

Personal details
- Born: 1 July 1957 (age 68)
- Party: African National Congress
- Profession: Politician

Duduzile Patricia Sibiya (born 1 July 1957) is a South African politician and a former Member of the National Assembly of South Africa. She is a member of the African National Congress (ANC).

== Education ==
Sibiya only attended high school until Grade 11. She holds no tertiary qualifications.

== Political career ==
As a member of the African National Congress, Sibiya has been a member of the provincial executive committee (PEC) of the African National Congress Women's League since 1997.

=== Parliament ===
In 2011, Sibiya was elected to the National Assembly of South Africa as a member of the African National Congress. She was appointed to the Portfolio Committee on Police. Prior to the 2014 elections, Sibiya was number 35 on the ANC's list in KwaZulu-Natal. She was not elected to return to the National Assembly.

Sibiya stood as a parliamentary candidate and a candidate for the provincial legislature in the 2019 national and provincial elections. She was elected to the National Assembly. During her second term in the National Assembly, she was a member of the Portfolio Committee on Higher Education, Science and Technology.

In 2024 Sibiya stood for reelection at 170th on the ANC's national list which was too low to secure reelection.

== Personal life ==
Sibiya's interests include singing, gardening and reading.
