= Nobuhle Nkabane =

South African politician (born 1979)

Nobuhle Nkabane MP
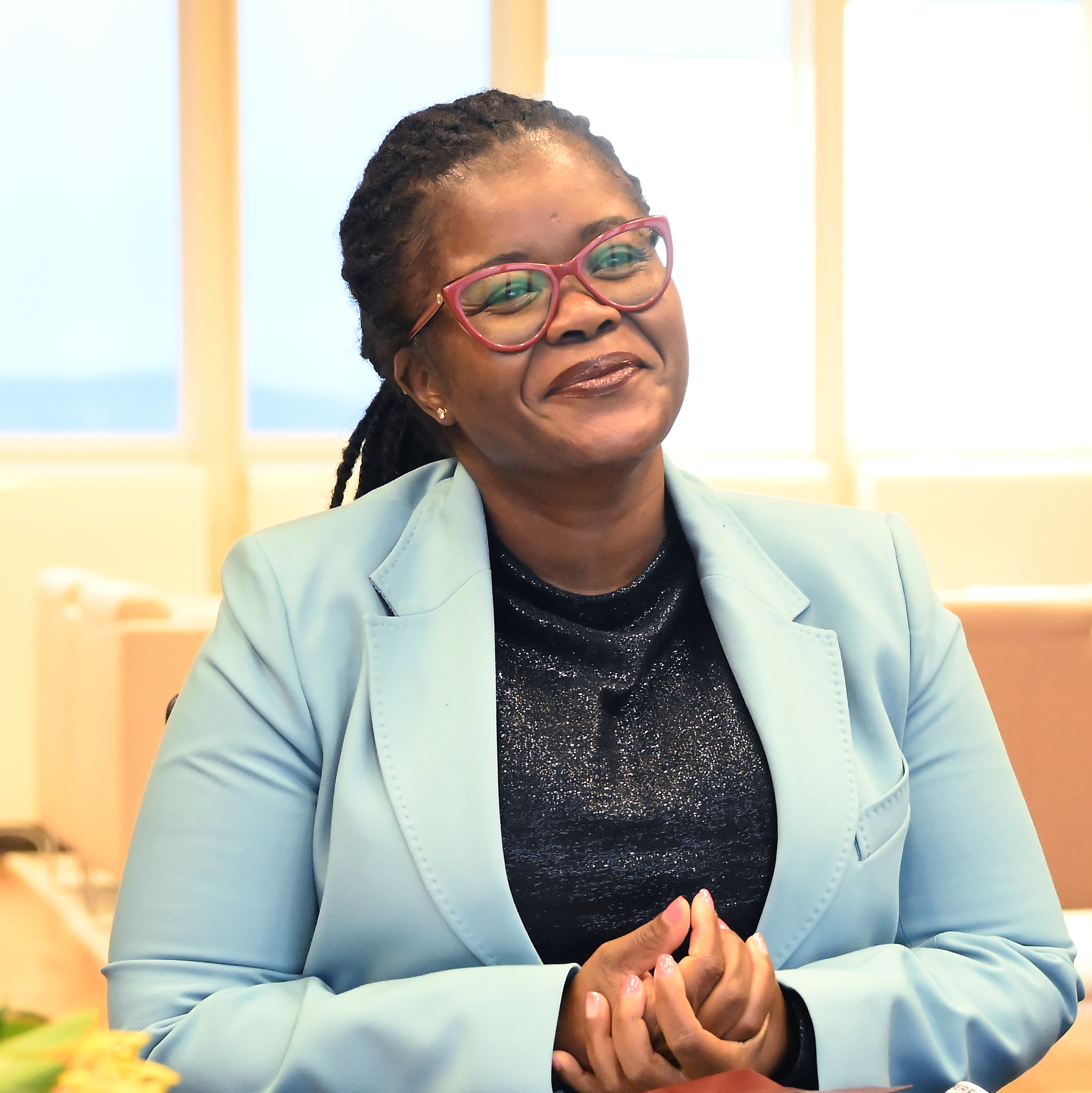
- Nkabane in 2022

Minister of Higher Education
- In office 3 July 2024 – 21 July 2025

Deputy Minister of Mineral Resources and Energy
- In office 6 August 2021 – 30 June 2024
- President: Cyril Ramaphosa
- Preceded by: Bavelile Hlongwa

Member of the National Assembly of South Africa
- Incumbent
- Assumed office 22 May 2019
- Constituency: KwaZulu-Natal

Personal details
- Born: Nobuhle Pamela Nkabane; 1 August 1979 (age 47)
- Party: African National Congress
- Education: Durban University of Technology; University of South Africa (BA); University of KwaZulu-Natal (BAdmin, BAdminHons, MA, PhD); University of the Western Cape; University of Stellenbosch Business School
- Occupation: Member of Parliament
- Profession: Politician, tutor

Nobuhle Pamela Nkabane MP (born 1 August 1979) was the Minister of Higher Education in the cabinet of South Africa, having been sworn in on 3 July 2024 and served until 21 July 2025. She previously served as the Deputy Minister of Mineral Resources and Energy from 2021 until 2024.

Nkabane is a member of the National Assembly of South Africa for the African National Congress. She was first elected an MP in the 2019 general election. Nkabane previously worked as a tutor at the University of South Africa while serving as an MP.

== Education ==
Nkabane earned a national diploma in commercial administration, business administration and management from the Durban University of Technology in 2001. She obtained a diploma in youth development, youth service/administration from the University of South Africa in 2009. In 2011, she graduated from UNISA with a bachelor's degree in humanities.

She earned a Bachelor of Administration Honours degree in Public Administration, a Master of Administration in Public Administration, and a Doctorate of Administration from the University of KwaZulu-Natal in 2019. In 2016/17 she fulfilled a compliance management programme at the University of Cape Town.

In 2017, she obtained a Level 7 NQF qualification in executive development from the University of Stellenbosch Business School and was a participant of the AAE Summer School in Nancy, France. In 2020, she achieved a post-graduate diploma in labour law from the University of the Western Cape. She is currently studying for a Master of Science degree in International Business Administration through SOAS University of London.

== Career ==
Nkabane worked as a personal assistant at the Umzimkhulu Local Municipality between March 2005 and November 2006 and as a youth coordinator at the Sisonke District Municipality from December 2006 to March 2012.

She was a customer care manager from April 2012 to December 2017 and a director of water governance and customer care from January 2018 to May 2019 for the Harry Gwala District Municipality. Since February 2019, Nkabane has been employed as a tutor at UNISA.

== Parliamentary career ==
Nkabane stood as a parliamentary candidate in the May 8, 2019 national and provincial elections for the African National Congress. She was elected to the National Assembly from the KwaZulu-Natal list and was sworn in on 22 May 2019.

On 27 June 2019, Nkabane was named to the Portfolio Committee on Human Settlements, Water and Sanitation and the Portfolio Committee on Employment and Labour. She left the Portfolio Committee on Human Settlements, Water and Sanitation on 19 July 2019.

Nkabane was appointed to the Portfolio Committee on Sports, Arts and Culture on 5 September 2019. She left that committee on 8 October 2020.

On 21 June 2021, Nkabane was named to the Committee for Section 194 Enquiry. The committee will determine Public Protector Busisiwe Mkhwebane's fitness to hold office.

=== National executive ===
On 5 August 2021, president Cyril Ramaphosa appointed Nkabane as Deputy Minister of Mineral Resources and Energy. She was sworn in on 6 August 2021.

On 16 March 2022, Nkabane said that South Africa should be investing in nuclear energy, while speaking at the Nuclear Technology Imbizo under the theme "Promoting Global Partnership to Support the South African New Nuclear Build Program". She also said that it has been proven internationally that nuclear energy provides "an invaluable electricity source".

On 3 July 2024, Nkabane was sworn in as South Africa's Minister of Higher Education.On 21 July 2025 Nobuhle Nkabane has been dismissed by Cyril Ramaphosa as a Minister of Higher education. Nkabane said she wasn't surprised about her dismissal.

== Controversy ==
In May 2025, it was found, via an information leak, that there were irregularities around 22 board chair appointments Nkabane had made to a Sector Education and Training Authority (SETA). One such appointment was for Buyambo Mantashe, the son of fellow South African politician, and Minister of Mineral Resources, Gwede Mantashe, and several individuals appointed were ANC associates.

SETAs are vocational skills training organizations responsible for promoting and facilitating education and training within specific economic sectors in South Africa. They play a vital role in implementing the country's National Skills Development Strategy, and increasing the skills of individuals within their respective sectors.

Nkabane appeared before a Portfolio Committee in Parliament on 30 May 2025, in order to answer questions relating to the contentious SETA appointments. During the sitting, she allegedly displayed an uninterested, disrespectful demeanor. Nkabane also refused to answer questions, and at one point told the portfolio members to Google for answers.

Nkabane also refused to disclose the names of the independent panel that oversaw the appointment process, and claimed that the process was free from flaws.

As soon as President Cyril Ramaphosa became aware of the appointments, he called Nkabane, and instructed her to withdraw them. The appointments were withdrawn after Ramaphosa read her the Riot Act, with Nkabane announcing on 16 May 2025 that she was withdrawing them due to public concerns. She said she would issue a Government Gazette calling for new appointments within 7 days. She further stated that a new independent panel would be established to make recommendations for and process the nominations.

President Ramaphosa, in response, requested that Nkabane submit a detailed report on the SETA chair appointment process, as well as an explanation of her conduct before the Portfolio Committee. The President stated that he expects members of the Executive to conduct themselves professionally, transparently, and cordially when engaging with Parliament, and other accountability structures.

In her defense, Nkabane stated that clips of the Committee proceedings posted online had been taken out of context, and she maintained she was not disrespectful towards the Parliamentary members who questioned her.
