= Thembeka Mchunu =

South African politician (born 1968)

Thembeka Mchunu MP

Member of the National Assembly of South Africa
- Incumbent
- Assumed office 22 May 2019
- Constituency: KwaZulu-Natal

Personal details
- Born: 31 January 1968 (age 58) Ixopo, Natal Province, South Africa
- Party: African National Congress
- Spouse: Senzo Mchunu (m. 1990)
- Relations: Thabo Mofokeng (brother)
- Children: 5 (1 deceased)
- Parent(s): Thenjiwe (mother); Joshua (father)
- Profession: Educator; Politician

Thembeka Vuyisile Buyisile Mchunu (born 31 January 1968) is a South African politician from KwaZulu-Natal serving as a Member of the National Assembly of South Africa since 2019. A member of the African National Congress, she served as the Executive Mayor of the Uthungulu District Municipality from 2011 to 2016. She is married to Senzo Mchunu, the suspended Minister of Police and former premier of KwaZulu-Natal.

== Early life and education ==
Mchunu was born on 31 January 1968, in Ixopo in South Africa's former Natal Province, to Thenjiwe and Joshua. She is the older sister of Thabo Mofokeng, who formerly served as the spokesperson of the eThekwini Metropolitan Municipality. Her parents divorced when she was five. She and Thabo then went to live with her paternal grandmother. She attended Carisbrooke Primary School and later Laduma High School.

When she was in Grade 8, Mchunu relocated to Pietermaritzburg to live with her mother, who was a teacher. She matriculated from St Augustine's in 1985. Mchunu then studied to become a teacher at the Umbumbulu College of Education. She earned a diploma in education and began her teaching career in Zululand in 1990.

== Career ==
Mchunu taught at multiple schools in Zululand between 1990 and 2006, when she was elected as an African National Congress councillor in the Uthungulu District Municipality. She served as a regional secretary for the African National Congress Women's League. In 2011, she was elected mayor of the district municipality. During her mayoralty, the district received its first clean audit from the Auditor-General for the 2012/2013 financial year. Following her husband Senzo's election as premier and she becoming First Lady of KwaZulu-Natal in 2013, opposition parties called on her to step down as mayor. She rejected their calls, saying in a 2014 interview with the Zululand Observer: "I think opposition parties are just playing politics."

Following mounting pressure from the ANC, Mchunu's husband, Senzo, resigned as premier in May 2016, causing her to lose the title of First Lady. Prior to the local elections in August 2016, the ANC nominated Nonhle Mkhulisi as their mayoral candidate for the district. The district was also renamed to the King Cetshwayo District Municipality. Mchunu had started the process to change the district's name after she was elected as mayor in 2011.

== Parliamentary career ==
Mchunu was elected to the National Assembly in the 2019 general elections from the ANC's KwaZulu-Natal list. She sits on the Portfolio Committee on Environment, Forestry and Fisheries. Her husband currently serves as Minister of Police.

== Candidacy for Regional Chairperson ==
In January 2022, Mchunu was announced as a candidate for regional chairperson of the ANC's Musa Dladla (King Cetshwayo District) region. Mchunu led a slate that included Tholi Gwala as her deputy with former district mayor Lindo Phungula as regional treasurer. She lost to Musa Cebekhulu at the regional conference in May 2022.

== ANC Women's League presidential bid ==
Mchunu stood for the position of president of the African National Congress Women's League at the league's national conference held in July 2023 against former league Secretary-General Sisisi Tolashe and the outgoing president of the Women's League, Bathabile Dlamini. At the conference, it was revealed that Mchunu had received the second highest amount of branch nominations with 796 nominations, behind Tolashe who received the highest amount of branch nominations with 1,564 nominations. Mchunu's presidential bid was ultimately unsuccessful as Tolashe was announced as the league's new president on 23 July 2023, having received 1,729 votes compared to Mchunu's 1,038 votes and Dlamini's 170 votes.

== Personal life ==
Mchunu met Senzo Mchunu when she was 16 years old. They married in July 1990. They had a son but he died. She had four more children with Senzo, two boys and two girls. They also have grandchildren.
