= Sibusiso Gumede =

South African politician

Sibusiso Gumede MP

Member of Parliament from KwaZulu-Natal
- In office 22 May 2019 – 28 May 2024

Personal details
- Party: ANC

Sibusiso Nigel Gumede is a South African politician who served as a Member of Parliament (MP) for the African National Congress from 2019 until 2024.
