= Ellis Vezi =

South African politician (born 1938)

Member of the National Assembly
- In office August 2002 – 31 March 2007

Member of the KwaZulu-Natal Legislature
- In office June 1999 – August 2002

Personal details
- Born: Temba Ellis Vezi; 16 December 1938 (age 87)
- Citizenship: South Africa
- Party: Inkatha Freedom Party

Temba Ellis Vezi (born 16 December 1938) is a retired South African politician who represented the Inkatha Freedom Party (IFP) in the National Assembly from 2002 to 2007. Before that, he served in the KwaZulu-Natal Legislature from 1999 to 2002. During apartheid, he was a politician and legislator in the KwaZulu bantustan.

== Early life and career ==
Born on 16 December 1938, Vezi was a longstanding member of the IFP and represented the party (then called Inkatha) as a backbencher in the KwaZulu Legislative Assembly during apartheid. During the same period, he worked for more than two decades at a law firm, and he was later a development officer at Barclays Bank and a self-employed insurance broker.

== Post-apartheid political career ==
In the 1999 general election, Vezi was elected for the first time to the KwaZulu-Natal Legislature, representing the IFP. However, midway through the term, in August 2002, he was transferred to a seat in the National Assembly. The transfer came in the run-up to a floor-crossing window; with the IFP in danger of losing its control of the province, observers assumed that the party was attempting to ensure that its provincial caucus was peopled with maximally loyally members who would not defect to another party.

In the next general election in 2004, Vezi was elected to a full term in the National Assembly, serving the KwaZulu-Natal constituency. He resigned on 31 March 2007 and was replaced by Pat Lebenya the following day.
