= Connie Zikalala =

South African politician (1939–2021)

Member of the National Assembly
- In office 23 April 2004 – 7 May 2014

Personal details
- Born: November 1939
- Died: 15 January 2021 (aged 81)
- Citizenship: South Africa
- Party: Inkatha Freedom Party

Constance Ntombikayise Zerish Zikalala (November 1939 – 15 January 2021) was a South African politician who represented the Inkatha Freedom Party (IFP) in the National Assembly from 2004 to 2014. A teacher by profession, she entered politics during apartheid through the government of the Kwazulu homeland. She was active in the IFP Women's Brigade and served on the party's National Council.

== Early life and career ==
Zikalala was born in November 1939 and was a teacher by profession. During apartheid, she represented the Madadeni constituency in the KwaZulu Legislative Assembly. In 1975 she was a founding member of Mangosuthu Buthelezi's Inkatha (later the IFP), and she was also a founding member of the Inkatha Women's Brigade in 1977.

During the democratic transition of the 1990s, she was a member of the IFP's delegation to the Convention for a Democratic South Africa. According to her party, during the same period she played a key role in mediating in the political violence between the IFP and African National Congress (ANC) in the Transvaal regions in that capacity she worked with her counterpart in the ANC Women's League, Bertha Gxowa.

== Post-apartheid political career ==
After the end of apartheid, Zikalala was a provincial leader in the IFP's Gauteng branch and also served on the IFP National Council. In the 2004 general election, she was elected to an IFP seat in the National Assembly, the lower house of the South African Parliament. She was re-elected to her seat in the 2009 general election, but in the 2014 general election she was ranked 13th on the IFP's national party list and therefore narrowly failed to secure a seat.

== Personal life ==
She died on 15 January 2021, aged 81, after a short illness. She was Christian and had four children and ten grandchildren.
