= Magdalena Hlengwa =

South African politician

Member of the National Assembly of South Africa
- In office 22 May 2019 – 28 May 2024

Personal details
- Born: 21 November 1951 (age 74) Melmoth, South Africa
- Party: Inkatha Freedom Party
- Spouse: Dalton Hlengwa
- Occupation: Member of Parliament
- Profession: Politician

Magdalena Duduzile Hlengwa (born 21 November 1951) is a South African politician who served as a Member of the National Assembly of South Africa from May 2019 until May 2024. Hlengwa is a member of the Inkatha Freedom Party.

== Early life and career ==
Hlengwa was born on 21 November 1951 in Melmoth in the former Natal Province. Her mother was a housewife, while her father worked on the railway. Her mother was also from the Biyela clan. Hlengwa matriculated from Masibumbane High School in Ulundi. She trained as a nurse but her family did not approve of her working late-night shifts, so she then worked as a teacher.

Between 1998 and 2011, Hlengwa was principal of Zalizwi Primary School in Ulundi.

== Parliamentary career ==
In 2019, Hlengwa stood for election to the South African National Assembly as 5th on the Inkatha Freedom Party's regional list. At the May election, Hlengwa won a seat in the National Assembly. Hlengwa received her committee assignments on 27 June 2019.

Hlengwa was not ranked high enough on the IFP list to be turned to parliament following the 2024 general election.

=== Committee assignments ===
- Portfolio Committee on Health
- Portfolio Committee on Women, Youth and People with Disabilities

== Personal life ==
Hlengwa was married to Dalton Hlengwa until his death in 1984. They had a daughter together. Hlengwa also has two grandchildren and two great-grandchildren.
