= Maria Ntuli =

South African politician (born 1953)

Member of the National Assembly of South Africa
- In office 22 May 2019 – 28 May 2024
- Constituency: KwaZulu-Natal

Personal details
- Born: Makhoni Maria Ntuli; 10 June 1953 (age 73)
- Party: African National Congress
- Profession: Politician

Makhoni Maria Ntuli (born 10 June 1953) is a South African politician who served as a member of the National Assembly of South Africa for the African National Congress. She was elected to the National Assembly in 2019. Ntuli previously served in the KwaZulu-Natal Provincial Legislature.

During her time in parliament, Ntuli served on the Portfolio Committee on Public Service and Administration. In the KwaZulu-Natal legislature, she was a member of the PMLPPP Committee and the Sports and Recreation Committee.

Ntuli did not stand in the 2024 general election and left parliament.
