= Zwelifile Ntuli =

South African politician (1954–2021)

Zwelifile Christopher Ntuli

Member of the KwaZulu-Natal Provincial Legislature
- In office 21 May 2014 – 7 May 2019

Member of the National Assembly of South Africa
- In office 6 May 2009 – 6 May 2014
- Constituency: KwaZulu-Natal

Personal details
- Born: Zwelifile Christopher Ntuli; 2 January 1954
- Died: 2 February 2021 (aged 67)
- Party: African National Congress (Until 2021; his death)
- Profession: Politician

Zwelifile Christopher Ntuli (2 January 1954 – 2 February 2021) was a South African politician and member of the African National Congress who served as a member of the National Assembly of South Africa from 2009 until his election to the KwaZulu-Natal Provincial Legislature in 2014. Ntuli left the legislature at the 2019 election.

== Political career ==
Ntuli was a leader of the South Durban region of the African National Congress. He played a crucial role in ensuring the presence of the ANC in rural communities in KwaZulu-Natal and building relations with traditional leaders.

Ntuli stood for election to the South African National Assembly in the 2009 general elections as a candidate on the ANC's list of parliamentary candidates from KwaZulu-Natal and was elected and sworn in on 6 May 2009. He was a member of the Portfolio Committee on Economic Development during his tenure in parliament.

Ntuli stood for election to the KwaZulu-Natal Provincial Legislature in the 2014 provincial election as 44th on the ANC's provincial list. He was elected as the ANC won 52 seats in the legislature at the election.

Ntuli did not stand for re-election in 2019 and left the provincial legislature on 7 May 2019.

== Death ==
Ntuli died from COVID-19 on 2 February 2021, during the COVID-19 pandemic in South Africa.
