= Mfuniselwa Bhengu =

South African politician and philosopher

Member of the National Assembly
- In office 23 April 2004 – May 2009
- Constituency: KwaZulu-Natal

Personal details
- Born: Mfuniselwa John Bhengu; 24 May 1953 (age 72)
- Citizenship: South Africa
- Party: Inkatha Freedom Party

Mfuniselwa John Bhengu (born 24 May 1953) is a South African politician and social philosopher. Between 1999 and 2014, he represented the Inkatha Freedom Party (IFP) in the KwaZulu-Natal Legislature and both houses of the South African Parliament.

== Legislative career ==
Bhengu represented the IFP in the KwaZulu-Natal delegation of the National Council of Provinces during the second democratic Parliament. In the next general election in 2004, he was elected to the National Assembly, again serving the KwaZulu-Natal caucus. After a single term in the National Assembly, he was elected to the KwaZulu-Natal Legislature in 2009.

== Scholarship ==
Bhengu's philosophical work focuses on African social philosophy and moral economy. He is a noted advocate of the philosophy of ubuntu. His books include Ubuntu: The Global Philosophy for Humankind, published in 2007 while he was a sitting MP.
