= Regina Lesoma =

South African politician

Member of the National Assembly of South Africa
- In office 22 May 2012 – 28 May 2024

Personal details
- Party: African National Congress
- Occupation: Member of Parliament
- Profession: Politician

Regina Mina Mpontseng Lesoma is a South African politician who served as a Member of the National Assembly of South Africa from 2012 until 2024, representing the African National Congress (ANC). She was elected to a full term in 2014 and re-elected in 2019 before losing her seat in 2024.

Lesoma served on the Joint Committee on Ethics and Members' Interests, the Joint Standing Committee on the Financial Management of Parliament and the Rules Committee.
