= Japhta Malinga =

South African politician

Japhta Malinga MP

Member of the National Assembly of South Africa
- Incumbent
- Assumed office 25 June 2024

Personal details
- Born: Japhta Sihle Malinga
- Party: uMkhonto weSizwe Party
- Profession: Politician

Japhta Sihle Malinga is a South African politician who has been a Member of the National Assembly of South Africa since June 2024, where he represents the uMkhonto weSizwe Party.

In October 2024, Malinga was named to the Portfolio Committee on Public Service and Administration. He was appointed as an alternate member of both the Portfolio Committee on Mineral and Petroleum Resources and the Portfolio Committee on Tourism in February 2025. He relinquished his membership of the Portfolio Committee on Tourism in July 2025.

In July 2025, Malinga rejected the proposed 2025/2026 budget for the Department of Public Service and Administration as a "moral imperative."
