= Siyabonga Mkhize =

South African politician

Siyabonga Mkhize MP

Member of the National Assembly of South Africa
- Incumbent
- Assumed office 25 June 2024

Personal details
- Born: Siyabonga Percival Mkhize
- Party: uMkhonto weSizwe Party
- Profession: Politician

Siyabonga Percival Mkhize is a South African politician and a Member of Parliament in the National Assembly of South Africa for the uMkhonto weSizwe Party. Mkhize was sworn into office in June 2024.

In parliament, Mkhize serves on the Portfolio Committee on Forestry, Fisheries and the Environment.
