= Sibongiseni Ngcobo =

South African politician (born 1995)

Member of the National Assembly of South Africa
- In office 22 May 2019 – 28 May 2024

Personal details
- Born: Sibongiseni Ngcobo; May 30, 1995 (age 31) Bulwer, KwaZulu-Natal, South Africa
- Party: Democratic Alliance
- Education: University of KwaZulu-Natal
- Profession: Politician

Sibongiseni Ngcobo (born 30 May 1995) is a South African politician who served as a Member of Parliament (MP) in the National Assembly from May 2019 until May 2024. A member of the Democratic Alliance, he was the youngest Member of the National Assembly at the time of his election to Parliament. Ngcobo served as a DA councillor in the Richmond Local Municipality from 2016 to 2019.

== Early life and education ==
Ngcobo was born in 1995 in Bulwer, KwaZulu-Natal. His parents were farmworkers. He holds a bachelor of arts degree in politics, philosophy and economics from the University of KwaZulu-Natal. Ngcobo is currently enrolled for an LLB at the university.

== Politics ==
Ngcobo took an interest in politics while he was in grade six. While a student at the University of KwaZulu-Natal, he established the university's Democratic Alliance student organisation (DASO) branch. The university's student representative council initially dismissed his application for them to recognise the DASO branch, but he appealed to the university's Recognition Appeals Committee, and they recognised the branch, which led to it becoming a recognised organisation on the university's campus. Ngcobo was later elected to the university's SRC as a DASO representative.

In August 2016, he was elected as one of two DA councillors in the Richmond Local Municipality.

== Parliamentary career ==
For the 2019 general elections, he was placed ninth on the DA's list of KwaZulu-Natal candidates for the National Assembly. He was ranked low on the DA's list of candidates for the KwaZulu-Natal Legislature. After the election, Ngcobo was nominated to the National Assembly. Ngcobo was sworn in as an MP on 22 May 2019. At the time, he was youngest member of the National Assembly and the second-youngest MP of both houses. The youngest MP of both houses is Itumeleng Ntsube of the ruling African National Congress, who serves in the National Council of Provinces, the upper house.

In June 2019, Ngcobo was appointed an alternate member of the Portfolio Committee on Women, Youth and People with Disabilities.

Ngcobo became an additional member of the Higher Education, Science and Innovation on 21 April 2023. He was ranked too low on the DA's list to secure reelection in 2024.
