= Zakhele Mkhize =

South African politician

Member of the National Assembly
- In office 23 April 2004 – May 2009
- Constituency: KwaZulu-Natal

Personal details
- Born: Zakhele Sipho Mkhize; 6 September 1950 (age 75)
- Citizenship: South Africa
- Party: African National Congress

Zakhele Sipho Mkhize (born 6 September 1950) is a South African politician who represented the KwaZulu-Natal constituency in the National Assembly from 2004 to 2009. A member of the African National Congress, he was elected in the 2004 general election, ranked eighth on the party's regional list for KwaZulu-Natal. He did not stand for re-election in 2009.
