= Pinky Mngadi =

South African politician

Pinky Mngadi MP

Member of the National Assembly of South Africa
- Incumbent
- Assumed office 25 June 2024

Personal details
- Party: uMkhonto weSizwe Party

Pinky Pearlgene Mngadi (formerly Ncube) is a South African politician who has been a Member of the National Assembly of South Africa since June 2024, representing the uMkhonto weSizwe Party. She was elected in the 2024 general election.

In July 2024, Mngadi was appointed to the Portfolio Committee on Basic Education. She was also appointed a party whip. She was removed as a whip in March 2025. Mngadi was appointed as an alternate member of the Portfolio Committee on Social Development in July 2025.
