= Rafeek Shah =

South African politician

Member of the KwaZulu-Natal Provincial Legislature
- In office 21 May 2014 – 7 May 2019

Member of the National Assembly
- In office 23 April 2004 – June 2009
- Constituency: KwaZulu-Natal
- In office 1 February 2012 – 6 May 2014

Personal details
- Citizenship: South Africa
- Party: ActionSA (since 2022); Democratic Alliance (until 2022)

Mohammed Rafeek Sayedali Shah is a South African politician from KwaZulu-Natal. He represented the Democratic Alliance (DA) in the National Assembly from 2004 to 2009 and from 2012 to 2014, and later in the KwaZulu-Natal Provincial Legislature from 2014 to 2019. In 2022, he announced that he had left the DA to join ActionSA.

== Legislative career ==
Shah was elected to the National Assembly in the 2004 general election, representing the DA in the KwaZulu-Natal constituency. He was not initially re-elected in 2009, but he rejoined the National Assembly between 2012 and 2014, filling a mid-term casual vacancy.

In the next general election in 2014, he was elected to represented the DA in the KwaZulu-Natal Provincial Legislature, ranked ninth on the party's provincial list. During the legislative term that followed, he served as the DA's provincial spokesperson in the transport portfolio.

In the 2019 general election, he stood for election both to the National Assembly and to the KwaZulu-Natal Provincial Legislature, but he was not ranked highly enough to gain a seat in either. In December 2022, he announced that he had left the DA to join ActionSA, a recently established opposition party.
