= Tim Brauteseth =

South African politician

Tim Brauteseth MP

Permanent delegate to the National Council of Provinces from KwaZulu-Natal
- Incumbent
- Assumed office 23 May 2019

Member of the National Assembly of South Africa
- In office 21 May 2014 – 7 May 2019

Personal details
- Born: Timothy James Brauteseth
- Party: Democratic Alliance
- Profession: Forensic investigator

Timothy James Brauteseth is a South African forensic investigator and Democratic Alliance politician from KwaZulu-Natal who has served as a permanent delegate to the National Council of Provinces since May 2019. Brauteseth was a Member of the National Assembly from May 2014 until May 2019.

== Career ==
Brauteseth worked as a forensic investigator before becoming active in politics.

=== National Assembly ===
In 2014, he was elected to the National Assembly of South Africa as a member of the Democratic Alliance.

He sat on the Standing Committee on Public Accounts (SCOPA) from 20 June 2014 to 7 May 2019.

=== National Council of Provinces ===
After the 2019 general election, Brauteseth was elected as a permanent delegate to the National Council of Provinces from KwaZulu-Natal. He was sworn into the NCOP on 23 May 2019.

==== Committee assignments ====
- Joint Standing Committee on Financial Management of Parliament
- Select Committee on Transport, Public Service and Administration, Public Works and Infrastructure
- Select Committee on Trade and Industry, Economic Development, Small Business Development, Tourism, Employment and Labour
