= Everson Xolo =

South African politician and traditional leader (1946–2012)

Member of the National Assembly
- In office 23 April 2004 – May 2009
- Constituency: KwaZulu-Natal

Personal details
- Born: Everson Thobigunya Xolo; 2 November 1946 KwaXolo, Ezinqoleni; Natal, Union of South Africa
- Died: 2 March 2012 (aged 65) Port Shepstone; KwaZulu-Natal, South Africa
- Party: African National Congress
- Other political affiliations: Inkatha (until 1993)
- Children: 6, including Malusi and Mxolisi

Everson Thobigunya Xolo (2 December 1946 – 2 March 2012) was a South African politician and Zulu traditional leader. He was the chief of the Xolo clan at KwaXolo on the Natal South Coast from the late 1960s until 2010, and he represented the African National Congress (ANC) in the National Assembly from 2004 to 2009.

During apartheid, Xolo was a member of the Inkatha Freedom Party (IFP) and served as a minister in the KwaZulu government. In December 1993, he was critically injured in an assassination attempt – presumed to have been planned by IFP supporters – and driven temporarily from KwaXolo. He subsequently joined the ANC and held leadership positions in the ANC-aligned Congress of Traditional Leaders of South Africa (Contralesa).

== Early life and career ==
Xolo was born on 2 December 1946 at KwaXolo, a rural village near Ezinqoleni on the Lower South Coast of the former Natal Province. He had six brothers and two sisters. At the age of 23, he inherited the chieftaincy of the Xolo clan, a Zulu clan at KwaXolo. He also served in the government of the KwaZulu bantustan as a cabinet minister under Mangosuthu Buthelezi, but he resigned from the cabinet in 1978 to focus on his traditional leadership responsibilities.

== 1993 assassination attempt and aftermath ==
In the autumn of 1993, during the political violence that accompanied the negotiations to end apartheid, Xolo fell out with Buthelezi's IFP after he obstructed a planned attack by IFP members on supporters of the rival ANC. Weeks later, on 30 December, Xolo was himself attacked in a presumed assassination attempt: four men with pistols and an automatic rifle shot him several times in his car as he left a community meeting. Xolo was critically injured and his left arm was permanently damaged.

In the aftermath, Xolo went into hiding in Durban, although he granted interviews to the international press in which he aired his disenchantment with the IFP and Buthelezi. He also joined the ANC-aligned Contralesa. Leadership of KwaXolo fell to an IFP-aligned chief, Sgoloza Xolo. However, Xolo later resumed his chieftaincy. He also rose through the ranks of Contralesa, serving as its provincial chairperson in KwaZulu-Natal, then succeeding Stella Sigcau as its national director of projects, and, finally, gaining election as its national treasurer.

== Legislative career ==
In the 2004 general election, Xolo was elected to represent the ANC in the KwaZulu-Natal caucus of the National Assembly. He served a single term in his seat and was a member of the Portfolio Committee on Correctional Services.

== Retirement and personal life ==
Xolo was married and had six children, three sons and three daughters. He was a member of the Lutheran Church of South Africa.

On 13 February 2010, months after leaving Parliament, he retired from his chieftaincy due to ill health. He was succeeded by his eldest son, Malusi, and then, upon Malusi's death in March 2011, by another son, Mxolisi. Xolo had diabetes and died on 2 March 2012 in Port Shepstone following a short illness.
