= Audrey Zuma =

South African politician

Aubrey Zuma

Member of the National Assembly of South Africa
- In office 22 May 2019 – 28 May 2024

Personal details
- Born: 7 November 1961 (age 64)
- Party: African National Congress
- Profession: Politician

Audrey Sbongile Zuma (born 7 November 1961) is a South African politician who served as a member of the National Assembly of South Africa from May 2019 until 2024. She is a member of the African National Congress.

== Background ==
Zuma completed grade 12 while attending school. She has been a member of the regional executive committees of the ANC and its women's league.

== Parliamentary career ==
For the 2014 general election, Zuma was placed 31st on the ANC's list of KwaZulu-Natal candidates for the National Assembly. She narrowly missed out on a place in parliament as the ANC won only 27 seats in KwaZulu-Natal.

She was moved up on the list for the 2019 general election, occupying the 8th position. She was elected to the National Assembly at the election.

After entering parliament, she became a member of the newly established Portfolio Committee on Employment and Labour. She did not stand in the 2024 general election and left parliament.
