= Ndaba Gcwabaza =

South African politician (born 1954)

Member of the National Assembly
- In office 23 April 2004 – 7 May 2019
- Constituency: KwaZulu-Natal

Personal details
- Born: Ndabakayise Erasmus Gcwabaza; 8 July 1954 (age 72)
- Citizenship: South Africa
- Party: African National Congress
- Other political affiliations: South African Communist Party

Ndabakayise Erasmus Gcwabaza (born 8 July 1954) is a South African politician and former anti-apartheid activist who represented the African National Congress (ANC) in the National Assembly from 2004 to 2019. First elected in April 2004, he represented the KwaZulu-Natal constituency.

During apartheid, Gcwabaza was a member of the regional executive committee of the United Democratic Front in Southern Natal from 1984 to 1991. After joining the underground of Umkhonto we Sizwe (MK) in 1988, he convened an MK unit in Klaarwater and helped establish another such unit in Hammarsdale. After the ANC and other anti-apartheid organisations were unbanned in 1990, he became chairperson of the ANC's new branch in Klaarwater from 1990 to 1994, and he was secretary of the Pinetown branch of the South African Communist Party from 1996 to 1998.
