= Sybil Seaton =

South African politician (born 1948)

Member of the National Assembly
- In office May 1994 – May 2009
- Constituency: KwaZulu-Natal

Personal details
- Born: 14 August 1948 (age 77)
- Citizenship: South Africa
- Party: African National Congress

Sybil Anne Seaton (born 14 August 1948) is a retired South African politician who represented the Inkatha Freedom Party (IFP) in the National Assembly from 1994 to 2009, serving the KwaZulu-Natal constituency.

== Legislative career ==
Seaton was born on 14 August 1948. She was elected to represent the IFP in the National Assembly in the 1994 general elections and served three terms, gaining re-election in 1999 and 2004; she represented the KwaZulu-Natal constituency. During her second term, she was the deputy chief whip of the IFP caucus; she continued in that position in her third term and later became the party's spokesman on correctional services. In that capacity she argued that Parliament should "reconsider" the abolition of capital punishment.

During her time in Parliament, Seaton spearheaded a campaign to improve MPs' remuneration packages. She raised the inadequacy of the prevailing package as early as 2003. In 2008, she drafted a private member's bill to increase MPs' pension, which received cross-partisan support and led to the formation of a multi-party task team that met with President Thabo Mbeki over pension packages. She retired ahead of the 2009 general election.
