= Ernest Myeni =

South African politician (born 1968)

Member of the National Assembly of South Africa
- In office 22 May 2019 – 28 May 2024

Personal details
- Born: Ernest Thokozani Myeni; 15 June 1968 (age 57)
- Party: African National Congress

Ernest Thokozani Myeni (born 15 June 1968) is a South African politician who was elected to the National Assembly of South Africa in the 2019 general election as a member of the African National Congress.

== Background ==
Myeni was born on 15 June 1968. He has matric and holds a diploma in business management.

Myeni served as a regional treasurer for the African National Congress.

== Parliament ==
Myeni stood for election to the South African National Assembly in the 2019 election as a candidate on the ANC's KwaZulu-Natal regional to national list. He was elected and sworn into office on 22 May 2019.

On 27 June 2019, Myeni was assigned to serve on the National Assembly's Portfolio Committee on Small Business Development.

Myeni did not stand in the 2024 general election as an ANC candidate and left parliament.
