= Shakes Cele =

South African politician

Member of the National Assembly

Assembly Member for KwaZulu-Natal
- In office 21 July 2010 – 7 May 2019
- In office 2 September 2005 – May 2009

Personal details
- Died: 25 July 2020 Pietermaritzburg, KwaZulu-Natal; South Africa
- Party: African National Congress

Mosie Anthony "Shakes" Cele (died 25 July 2020) was a South African politician who represented the African National Congress (ANC) in the National Assembly from 2004 to 2009.

== Anti-apartheid activism ==
Cele was a member of the United Democratic Front in the Natal Midlands, where he was also closely involved in establishing legal ANC structures after the party was unbanned in 1990. He was a member of the inaugural regional executive committee of the ANC's Natal Midlands branch, then chaired by Harry Gwala. In October 1992, he was travelling with Gwala's deputy, Reggie Hadebe, when Hadebe was assassinated outside Ixopo; Cele, Hadebe, and John Jeffery were driving back together from peace talks with Inkatha, and Cele sustained mild injuries when the car was ambushed.

== Post-apartheid political career ==
Cele went on to become regional secretary and then regional chair of the ANC's Moses Mabhida branch in Pietermaritzburg. On 2 September 2005, he was sworn in to an ANC seat in the National Assembly, representing the KwaZulu-Natal constituency; he replaced Ruth Bhengu, who had resigned. In the next general election in 2009, he was not immediately re-elected, but he was sworn in to fill another casual vacancy on 21 July 2010. He was re-elected in 2014, ranked fifth on the ANC's provincial party list for KwaZulu-Natal; during the legislative term that followed, he served as a party whip in the Portfolio Committee on Economic Development.

In the 2019 general election, he dropped to the rank of 34th on the ANC's provincial party list and he was not re-elected. He died on 25 July 2020 in Pietermaritzburg.
