= Shiaan-Bin Huang =

Shiaan-Bin Huang 黄士豪

Member of Parliament
- In office 21 January 2004 – 6 May 2014

Personal details
- Party: African National Congress
- Education
- Profession: Businessman, politician
- Website: ANC in Parliament

Shiaan-Bin Huang (Chinese: 黄士豪; pinyin: Huáng Shìháo) is a South-African politician who was a member of parliament of South Africa and member of the African National Congress (ANC). He was also regional chairman of the Inkatha Freedom Party before floor crossing to the ANC.

Huang has a PhD Business Administration (US) as well as an MBA (Wilson Institute of Management HK). He was the deputy mayor of Newcastle in KwaZulu-Natal as well as executive councillor of Newcastle from 1995 to 2004. He is the first Chinese deputy mayor in Newcastle's history.

Huang served on the following South African Parliamentary Committees:

- committee member, Economic Development Committee.
- committee member, Portfolio Committee On Home Affairs
- committee member, Portfolio Committee On Public Works

Huang left parliament on 6 May 2014.

== Controversies ==
In September 2009 a company, Ascendo Industrial, which is owned by Huang's wife was awarded a product licence by Global Brands Group to allowing Ascendo to use FIFA's logo and brand name for the 2010 FIFA World Cup in South Africa. In a deal signed by Huang – who was company's managing director at the time – Ascendo Industrial then subcontracted the production of FIFA memorabilia to a Shanghai Fashion Plastic & Gifts in China.
