= Donald Gumede =

South African politician (born 1950)

Member of the National Assembly
- In office January 1995 – 7 May 2019

Personal details
- Born: Donald Mlindwa Gumede; 30 August 1950 (age 76)
- Citizenship: South Africa
- Party: African National Congress
- Relations: Archie Gumede (father); Josiah Gumede (grandfather)
- Education: University of the Western Cape

Donald Mlindwa Gumede (born 30 August 1950) is a South African politician who represented the African National Congress (ANC) in the National Assembly from 1995 to 2019. He was active in the anti-apartheid movement and trade union movement during apartheid.

== Early life and activism ==
Born on 30 August 1950, Gumede is the son of Archie Gumede and the grandson of Josiah Gumede, both ANC stalwarts. He was involved in anti-apartheid activism through the United Democratic Front in the 1980s and was a founding member of the Congress of South African Trade Unions. He holds a Bachelor's degree from the University of the Western Cape.

== Legislative career ==
Gumede joined the National Assembly in early 1995, filling a casual vacancy. He was elected to a full term in the assembly in the 1999 general election and thereafter served four terms in his seat, gaining re-election in 2004, 2009, 2014. Initially listed on the ANC's national party, he represented the KwaZulu-Natal constituency during his last two terms in the assembly.
