= Maliyakhe Shelembe =

South African politician

Maliyakhe Shelembe MP

Member of the National Assembly of South Africa
- Incumbent
- Assumed office 22 May 2019
- In office 21 May 2014 – 16 April 2019

Personal details
- Party: Democratic Alliance
- Other political affiliations: National Freedom Party; Inkatha Freedom Party

Maliyakhe Lymon Shelembe is a South African politician. Shelembe was an Inkatha Freedom Party member until 2011. He was elected to the National Assembly in 2014 as a member of the National Freedom Party. Shelembe became a Democratic Alliance MP after the 2019 elections.

== Political career ==
He was elected as a ward councillor for the Inkatha Freedom Party in 2001. Later that year, he was elected Deputy Mayor of the Umtshezi Local Municipality. He eventually became mayor of the municipality.

The African National Congress won control of the municipality in 2004 and Shelembe became an ordinary council member. In 2007, he returned to the position of mayor. In 2011, he joined the newly created National Freedom Party and was elected as deputy mayor of the Uthukela District Municipality after that year's municipal elections. He was elected the party's national chairperson in December 2011.

Shelembe was elected to the National Assembly in 2014. In March 2019, he became a member of the Democratic Alliance and returned to parliament after the general elections in May that year. In June 2019, he was appointed as shadow deputy minister of Defence and Military Veterans. Shelembe remained in the position following John Steenhuisen's election as parliamentary leader.

Shelembe was re-elected to the National Assembly in the 2024 general election.
