= Velaphi Ndlovu =

South African politician (born 1948)

Member of the National Assembly
- In office April 2004 – 6 May 2014
- Constituency: KwaZulu-Natal
- In office 9 May 1994 – August 2002
- Constituency: KwaZulu-Natal

Member of the KwaZulu-Natal Legislature
- In office August 2002 – April 2004

Personal details
- Born: Velaphi Bethuel Ndlovu; 25 June 1948 (age 77)
- Citizenship: South Africa
- Party: Inkatha Freedom Party

Velaphi Bethuel Ndlovu (born 25 June 1948) is a South African politician from KwaZulu-Natal. He represented the Inkatha Freedom Party (IFP) in the National Assembly and KwaZulu-Natal Provincial Legislature for two decades from 1994 to 2014. During apartheid, he was a member of the KwaZulu Legislative Assembly, serving the Imbali constituency. He is also a former deputy chairperson of the IFP.

== Early life and career ==
Ndlovu was born on 25 June 1948. During the 1980s, he served in the legislative assembly of the bantustan of KwaZulu, at that time governed by Inkatha (later the IFP). His constituency was Imbali, a township on the outskirts of Pietermaritzburg in the Natal Midlands; he also chaired Inkatha's regional branch in Imbali.

=== Political violence ===
During the late apartheid period, the region was severely affected by political violence between Inkatha supporters and supporters of the rival African National Congress (ANC) and United Democratic Front (UDF). Ndlovu unabashedly encouraged IFP supporters to use violence against ANC and UDF supporters – or even their relatives – which he described as the only way for them to survive an onslaught initiated by the ANC. He told journalist Matthew Kentridge:

...in the first place when the war was started, Inkatha people didn't want to kill the people, they didn't want to defend themselves because they didn't know what is going on. A chap, he doesn't know the people are coming to kill him, he knows them as neighbours and he sits down with them at his house only to find that he is being killed. When we told our membership that they should defend themselves, when we told them that life comes just once – just once – that’s how the ball has tended to the other side.

In 1987, the Weekly Mail quoted Ndlovu as saying, "As far as Inkatha is concerned there is no difference between self-defence and retaliation. It is all one thing."

It's defence. Because if there was no attacker there would be no revenge. Revenge killing is not acceptable in the [Inkatha] policy but what can you do if your house is burnt down and the law won't do anything about that? You revenge yourself so he won't come back again... It can be the teeth [as weapons] – everything – as long as they are defending themselves, because life comes once, not twice.

— Ndlovu on retaliatory killings, October 1987

== Post-apartheid career ==
Upon the end of apartheid in 1994, KwaZulu was absorbed into the South African province of KwaZulu-Natal, and Ndlovu was elected to represent the IFP in the first democratic Parliament. He served four terms as a legislator from the IFP, primarily in the National Assembly. The exception was a stint in the KwaZulu-Natal Provincial Legislature from August 2002, though he was returned to the National Assembly in the next general election in 2004.

He was elected to his fourth and final term in the National Assembly in the 2009 general election. At that time he also served as deputy national chairperson of the IFP.

Ndlovu stood for election to a fifth term in the next general election in 2014, but he was ranked ninth on the IFP's regional party list for KwaZulu-Natal and did not win a seat.
