= Roy Ainslie =

South African politician

Member of the National Assembly
- In office June 1999 – 6 May 2014
- Constituency: KwaZulu-Natal

Personal details
- Citizenship: South Africa
- Party: African National Congress (since 1994); Democratic Party (until 1994)

Arthur Roy Ainslie is a South African politician who represented the African National Congress (ANC) in the National Assembly from 1999 to 2014 and before that in the KwaZulu-Natal Provincial Legislature from 1994 to 1999.

Ainslie has a bachelor's degree from the University of Cape Town. During apartheid, he was active in liberal white political organisations, first as a leader of the National Union of South African Students (Nusas) in the 1970s and then as a member of the Democratic Party. In South Africa's first post-apartheid elections in 1994, he was elected to the new KwaZulu-Natal Provincial Legislature. In the next general election in 1999, he was elected to an ANC seat in the National Assembly, representing the KwaZulu-Natal constituency. He served three terms in the assembly, gaining re-election in 2004 and 2009. From 2010 he was the ANC's whip in the Standing Committee on Public Accounts.
