= Bavelile Hlongwa =

South African chemical engineer and politician (1981–2019)

Deputy Minister of Mineral Resources and Energy
- In office 30 May 2019 – 13 September 2019
- President: Cyril Ramaphosa
- Preceded by: Post created
- Succeeded by: Nobuhle Nkabane

Member of the National Assembly
- In office 22 May 2019 – 13 September 2019

Personal details
- Born: Bavelile Gloria Hlongwa; 14 April 1981 Umzinto, South Africa
- Died: 13 September 2019 (aged 38) Hammanskraal, South Africa
- Party: African National Congress
- Education: University of KwaZulu-Natal

Bavelile Gloria Hlongwa (14 April 1981 – 13 September 2019) was a South African chemical engineer and politician from KwaZulu-Natal and a party member of the African National Congress (ANC). She was the Deputy Minister of Mineral Resources and Energy and a Member of the National Assembly of South Africa from May 2019 until her death in September 2019.

== Early life and career ==
Bavelile Gloria Hlongwa was born 4 April 1981 in the town of Umzinto in the previous Natal Province. She began her schooling career at Ncazuka Primary School in 1989 and matriculated from Sihle High School in 2000. She studied at the University of KwaZulu-Natal Howard College campus and achieved a Bachelor of Science degree in chemical engineering. While at university, Hlongwa became active in the ANC Youth League and other student organisations. She was pursuing a master's degree in public administration at the time of her death.

Hlongwa has held various leadership positions. She was appointed to serve on the Local Community Development Committee in 1999. Hlongwa was elected to the South African Institute of Chemical Engineers in 2011, and, in 2013, she was designated as treasurer for the structure. She was appointed executive deputy chairperson of the board of the National Youth Development Agency in 2017.

Hlongwa started her career as a chemical engineer at Shell Downstream SA. She worked as an engineer from 2011 to 2013, and soon as a production engineer from 2013 to 2015 at Sapref. She was also a gas scheduler at the company from 2016 to 2017.

Hlongwa was appointed as the executive deputy chairperson of the board of the National Youth Development Agency in 2017, while she was deputy president of Convocation Executive Committee at the University of KwaZulu-Natal. From 2017 to 2019, she served as a non-executive board member of the Dube Trade Port Corporation. Hlongwa was a non-executive board member of the National Metrology Institute of South Africa from 2018 until 2019.

== Political career ==
Hlongwa was elected central president of the SRC at University of KwaZulu-Natal in 2009. She was a member of the ANC Youth League and worked as a member of the ANCYL's KwaZulu-Natal branch task team and was a member of various subcommittees from 2013 to 2015. She was a critic of the ANC Women's League.

In May 2019, Hlongwa was elected to the National Assembly of South Africa. She took office as a Member on 22 May 2019. President Cyril Ramaphosa soon after on 29 May 2019 appointed her as Deputy Minister of Mineral Resources and Energy, serving alongside Minister Gwede Mantashe. She was sworn in on 30 May 2019 and consequently became one of the youngest members of the cabinet.

== Death ==
Hlongwa died on 13 September 2019, when a truck ploughed into a previous car accident scene she was assisting with. The accident claimed the lives of Hlongwa and three other people. The accident occurred close to Maubane Bridge on the N1 at Carousel Plaza, Hammanskraal. President Cyril Ramaphosa expressed his sadness about her untimely death and declared that a state funeral would be held for her.

A memorial service for Hlongwa was held on 19 September 2019. The University of KwaZulu-Natal cancelled its memorial service it was scheduled to hold for her. Hlongwa's funeral was held on 21 September 2019.

== See also ==
- List of members of the National Assembly of South Africa who died in office
