= Bhekizizwe Luthuli =

South African politician

Bhekizizwe Nivard Luthuli is a South African politician who is a member of the National Assembly of South Africa from the Inkatha Freedom Party. He was first elected at the 2019 South African general election. He was re-elected in the 2024 general election.

== Views ==
Luthuli condemned a farm murder in July 2019.
