= Phumzile Bhengu-Kombe =

South African politician

Member of the National Assembly
- In office 23 April 2004 – 7 May 2019

Personal details
- Citizenship: South Africa
- Party: African National Congress

Phumzile Bhengu-Kombe is a South African politician who represented the African National Congress (ANC) in the National Assembly from 2004 to 2019. She was first elected in the 2004 general election, representing the KwaZulu-Natal constituency, and gained re-election in 2009 and 2014. In the 2019 general election, she was ranked 68th on the ANC's provincial party list for the ANC and failed to gain election to a fourth term.

Her local ANC branch is in Pomeroy in KwaZulu-Natal and she formerly served on the regional executive committees of the ANC and ANC Women's League in the Inkosi Bhambatha region in Umzinyathi.
