= Sibongile Mchunu =

South African politician

Sibongile Mchunu is a South African politician. She is a member of the National Assembly of South Africa representing the African National Congress.
