= Samuel Nxumalo (KwaZulu-Natal politician) =

South African politician (born 1958)

Member of the National Assembly
- In office 23 April 2004 – May 2009
- Constituency: KwaZulu-Natal

Personal details
- Born: Samuel Neocleous Nxumalo; 18 September 1958 (age 67)
- Citizenship: South Africa
- Party: African National Congress

Samuel Neocleous Nxumalo (born 18 September 1958) is a South African politician who represented the KwaZulu-Natal constituency in the National Assembly from 2004 to 2009. A member of the African National Congress, he was elected in the 2004 general election, ranked seventh on the party's regional list for KwaZulu-Natal. He did not stand for re-election in 2009.
