= Hlengiwe Mgabadeli =

South African politician

Member of the National Assembly
- In office 23 April 2004 – 6 May 2014

Personal details
- Citizenship: South Africa
- Party: African National Congress

Hlengiwe Christophina Mgabadeli is a South African politician who represented the African National Congress (ANC) in the National Assembly from 2004 to 2014. During her second term in the assembly, from 2009 to 2014, she represented the KwaZulu-Natal constituency and chaired Parliament's Joint Standing Committee on Defence.

== Legislative career ==
Mgabadeli was elected to an ANC seat in the National Assembly in the 2004 general election. She was re-elected in the next general election in 2009, and the ANC additionally nominated her to chair Parliament's Joint Standing Committee on Defence. In the 2014 general election, she was ranked 32nd on the ANC's provincial party list for KwaZulu-Natal and therefore failed to gain re-election.

In 2019, she returned briefly to the public eye while testifying at the State Capture Commission. Whistleblower Vytjie Mentor, in attempting to provide corroborating evidence for her claim that the Gupta family had offered her a ministerial job in 2010, told the commission that she might have told Mgabadeli about her meeting with the Guptas at the time, both because of a personal friendliness and because of Mgabadeli's committee job. However, Mgabadeli told the commission that she did not recall having heard about the meeting until Mentor made her public allegations years later.
