= Usha Roopnarain =

South African politician (born 1974)

Member of the National Assembly
- In office 27 June 2001 – May 2009
- Constituency: KwaZulu-Natal

Personal details
- Born: 7 July 1974 (age 51)
- Citizenship: South Africa
- Party: African National Congress (since June 2013)
- Other party: Inkatha Freedom Party (until June 2013)

Usha Roopnarain (born 7 July 1974) is a South African politician from KwaZulu-Natal. Between 1999 and 2013, she represented the Inkatha Freedom Party (IFP) in the National Assembly and KwaZulu-Natal Legislature. She resigned from the party in June 2013 and joined the African National Congress (ANC).

== Political career ==
Born on 7 July 1970, Roopnarain joined the IFP in 1998. In the general election of the following year, she was elected to represent the party in the KwaZulu-Natal Legislature, where she served until June 2001. On 27 June 2001, she was transferred to the National Assembly, where she swopped seats with Gabriel Ndabandaba. She was narrowly elected to a full term in the National Assembly in the 2004 general election.

In the 2009 general election, she was not initially re-elected to her seat, but she rejoined the KwaZulu-Natal Legislature during the legislative term that followed. She served as the IFP's shadow provincial minister for health. However, in early June 2013, she resigned from the IFP after the party leadership told her that it intended to remove her from her seat. According to Roopnarain, she had fallen out with the leadership in 2010 after she was nominated to serve on the party's national council and declined, which was viewed as disobedient and disrespectful to IFP leader Mangosuthu Buthelezi.

At a press conference in June, she said that she had left the IFP because she could not "sink into a political wilderness where virtues like honesty are not valued". She also announced that she was joining the rival ANC because she wanted to be part of a "progressive organisation".
