= Zeblon Zulu =

South African politician and Zulu prince

Member of the National Assembly
- In office 23 April 2004 – 6 May 2014

Delegate to the National Council of Provinces

Assembly Member for KwaZulu-Natal
- In office 1999–2004

Personal details
- Born: Nongoma, Natal; South Africa
- Party: African National Congress
- Other political affiliations: South African Communist Party

Prince Bhekizizwe Zeblon Zulu is a South African politician and prince of the Zulu royal family. He represented the African National Congress (ANC) in the National Assembly from 2004 to 2014 and before that in the National Council of Provinces from 1999 to 2004. He is also a published historian of the Zulu nation.

== Zulu royal family and history ==
Zulu is from Nongoma in present-day KwaZulu-Natal. He is a prince of the Zulu royal house of Mandlakazi and an uncle of the reigning Zulu King, Misuzulu Zulu. In 1994, Prince Mangosuthu Buthelezi named Zulu as one of several "latter-day busy-bodies" who were attempting to "vilify" him.

Zulu is also a historian of the Zulu people. His most recent book, Umongo kaZulu: The Marrow of the Zulu Nation was launched in 2006 at an event attended by King Goodwill Zwelithini, whose speech at the launch was disrupted by protests, apparently led by other members of the royal family. In 2023, he was awarded an honorary doctorate in literature by the University of KwaZulu-Natal.

== Legislative career: 1999–2014 ==
Zulu joined the upper house of the South African Parliament in 1999, representing the ANC in the National Council of Provinces. In the next general election in 2004, he was elected to an ANC seat in the National Assembly, the lower house of Parliament, and he served two terms there, gaining re-election in 2009. He chaired a local ANC branch in Zululand and was also a member of the South African Communist Party.

Zulu's political activity apparently made him a target of attacks in his home province. In 1994, the Mail & Guardian reported that his home in Nongoma had been attacked, and in January 2001, two huts at his homestead were burned down. On 1 February 2009, during the ANC's campaign ahead of that year's general election, Zulu was shot while leaving a party rally in Nongoma. He was shot in both legs and was seriously injured, and two others in his car, his son and daughter-in-law, were also shot and injured. The shooting was viewed as politically motivated and coincided with other acts of political violence in KwaZulu-Natal, for which the ANC blamed the opposition Inkatha Freedom Party.

== See also ==
- Mcwayizeni Zulu
