= Peter Smith (South African politician) =

South African politician

Member of the National Assembly
- In office 9 May 1994 – 6 May 2014

Personal details
- Born: Peter Francis Smith; 14 October 1954 (age 71)
- Citizenship: South Africa
- Party: Inkatha Freedom Party

Peter Francis Smith (born 14 October 1954) is a South African politician who represented the Inkatha Freedom Party (IFP) in the National Assembly from 1994 to 2014. He was first elected in the 1994 general election and served three terms thereafter, gaining re-election in 1999, 2004, and 2009. From 2004 onwards, he served the KwaZulu-Natal constituency in the assembly.

In November 1997, Smith tabled a private member's bill which proposed to amend the Constitution to remove the provision prohibiting cruel, inhuman, or degrading treatment, with the aim of allowing the reimposition of the death penalty in South Africa. In March 2002, the Mail & Guardian reported that he was likely to succeed Gavin Woods as chairperson of the Standing Committee on Public Accounts, although this expectation was not ultimately fulfilled.
