= Cheryllyn Dudley =

South African politician

Cheryllyn Dudley MP

Member of the National Assembly of South Africa
- Incumbent
- Assumed office June 1999

Personal details
- Party: African Christian Democratic Party
- Education: University of Natal
- Occupation: Politician

Cheryllyn Dudley is a South African politician who has served as a Member of the National Assembly of South Africa since the first democratic elections in 1999, representing the African Christian Democratic Party.

== Early life and career ==
Dudley attended high school in Zimbabwe and later studied at the University of Natal and obtained a Bachelor of Laws.

== Political career ==
First elected in 1999 and re-elected subsequently, Dudley has also served as the Parliamentary Whip for the African Christian Democratic Party since 2005. Dudley has spoken in favour of reforms to South Africa's labour laws, which the World Economic Forum ranks as the seventh-most restrictive in the world stating "Employment has increased among higher-income groups in South Africa, while lower earners have lost jobs...Despite legislative gains for workers' rights, social inequality has grown"

Dudley serves as a member of the Portfolio Committee on International Relations and Cooperation.
