= Mandla Mbili =

South African politician (1963 – 2012)

Member of the National Assembly of South Africa
- In office 2006 – 10 July 2012

Personal details
- Born: 16 October 1963 Nyangwini, Natal Province, South Africa
- Died: 10 July 2012 (aged 48) N2 near Lamontville, KwaZulu-Natal, South Africa
- Party: African National Congress
- Children: 10
- Education: Zwelibanzi High School
- Alma mater: University of South Africa; University of Zululand (BAdmin)

Mandlenkosi Enock Mbili (16 October 1963 – 10 July 2012) was a South African politician who served as a member of the National Assembly of South Africa from 2006 until his death in 2012, representing the African National Congress.

== Early life and education ==
Mbili was born on 16 October 1963 in the area of Nyangwini in present-day KwaZulu-Natal. He attended Zwelibanzi High School, after which he earned a Diploma in Marketing Management at the University of South Africa before going on to receive a Bachelor of Administration from the University of Zululand. He worked in the private sector and established his own business.

== Political career ==
Mbili served as chairperson of the ANC's KwaDabeka branch in KwaZulu-Natal from 1990 to 1994 and was a member of the Regional Executive Committee (REC) and the Regional Working Committee (RWC) of the party's Lower South Coast Region between 1999 and 2003.

== Parliamentary career ==
Mbili became an ANC member of the National Assembly of South Africa in 2006 and was elected to full term in 2009. He represented the community of Hibberdene. He was a member of the Portfolio Committee on Finance as well as the Standing Committee on Public Accounts (SCOPA) of which he was the ANC's whip for a number of years until he was demoted by ANC chief whip Mathole Motshekga in 2011 after he had a fall-out with Motshekga a year prior. He was a member of the Standing Committee on Appropriations at the time of his death.

== Death ==
Mbili died in a single-vehicle car accident on 10 July 2012 on the N2 near Lamontville in KwaZulu-Natal. He had allegedly lost control of his 4x4 and landed in a ditch while he was en route to his home in uMgababa from the airport. He had recently been discharged from hospital and was recovering from an earlier car accident. His funeral was held on 22 July 2012 at the Esibaneni Sports Ground in Mtwalume. On 7 August 2012, the National Assembly passed a motion of condolence to his family.

== See also ==
- List of members of the National Assembly of South Africa who died in office
