= List of National Council of Provinces members of the 25th Parliament of South Africa =

This is a list of members of the National Council of Provinces of the 25th South African Parliament from 2009 to 2014.

== Composition ==
Party	Delegate type	Province									Total	
Party	Delegate type	EC	FS	G	KZN	L	M	NW	NC	WC	Total	
African National Congress	Permanent	4	4	4	4	5	5	4	3	2	35	62
African National Congress	Special	3	3	3	3	4	4	3	3	1	27	62
Democratic Alliance	Permanent	1	1	1	1		1	1	1	3	10	13
Democratic Alliance	Special			1						2	3	13
Congress of the People	Permanent	1	1	1		1		1	1	1	7	8
Congress of the People	Special								1		1	8
Independent Democrats	Permanent								1		1	2
Independent Democrats	Special									1	1	2
Inkatha Freedom Party	Permanent				1						1	2
Inkatha Freedom Party	Special				1						1	2
Freedom Front Plus	Special		1								1	
United Christian Democratic Party	Special							1			1	
United Democratic Movement	Special	1									1	
Total		10	10	10	10	10	10	10	10	10	90	

== Permanent delegates ==
Name	Party	Province	Notes
Beverley Abrahams	DA	Gauteng	Sworn in on 1 October 2010 to replace Sherry Su-Huei Cheng.
Freddie Adams	ANC	Western Cape	
Jac Bekker	DA	Western Cape	
Dennis Bloem	COPE	Free State	
Grace Boroto	ANC	Mpumalanga	
Sonja Boshoff	DA	Mpumalanga	Sworn in on 3 December 2013 to replace Velly Makasana Manzini, who replaced Watty Watson on 8 November 2011.
Teboho Chaane	ANC	North West	
Charel de Beer	ANC	Northern Cape	
Onell de Beer	COPE	Western Cape	
Michael de Villiers	DA	Western Cape	
Masefako Dikgale	ANC	Limpopo	
Willem Faber	DA	Northern Cape	
Zukisa Faku	ANC	Eastern Cape	Sworn in on 25 April 2013 to replace Siphiwe Sam Mazosiwe.
Dirk Feldman	COPE	Gauteng	
Dumisani Gamede	ANC	KwaZulu-Natal	
Hermanus Groenewald	DA	North West	
Jan Gunda	ID	Northern Cape	
Mbuyiselo Jacobs	ANC	Free State	
Denis Joseph	DA	Western Cape	Sworn in on 20 October 2011 to replace Theodorus Barnardus Beyleveldt, who replaced Tim Harris on 12 October 2010.
Kesenkamang Kekesi	ANC	North West	Sworn in on 13 August 2013 to replace Collen Maine.
Alf Lees	DA	KwaZulu-Natal	Sworn in on 11 June 2009 to replace Dean MacPherson.
Peace Mabe	ANC	Gauteng	
Livhuhani Mabija	ANC	Limpopo	
Nosilivere Magadla	ANC	KwaZulu-Natal	
Mninwa Mahlangu	ANC	Limpopo	Chairperson
Mamosoeu Makgate	ANC	North West	
Mafemane Makhubela	COPE	Limpopo	
Thabo Makunyane	ANC	Limpopo	Sworn in on 22 May 2012 to replace Tlhalefi Andries Mashamaite.
Buoang Mashile	ANC	Mpumalanga	
Amos Matila	ANC	Gauteng	
Thandi Memela	ANC	KwaZulu-Natal	Deputy Chairperson
Zola Mlenzana	COPE	Eastern Cape	
Busisiwe Mncube	ANC	Gauteng	
Bafumani Mnguni	ANC	Free State	
Tjheta Mofokeng	ANC	Free State	
Matome Mokgobi	ANC	Limpopo	
Gauta Mokgoro	ANC	Northern Cape	
Sediane Montsitsi	ANC	Gauteng	
Moji Moshodi	ANC	Free State	
Bonisile Nesi	ANC	Eastern Cape	
Nosipho Ntwanambi	ANC	Western Cape	Chief Whip
Archibold Nyambi	ANC	Mpumalanga	
Lewis Nzimande	ANC	KwaZulu-Natal	
Swaphi Plaatjie	COPE	North West	
Agnes Qikani	ANC	Eastern Cape	
Daphne Rantho	ANC	Eastern Cape	
Rachel Rasmeni	ANC	North West	
Mtikeni Sibande	ANC	Mpumalanga	
Kenneth Sinclair	COPE	Northern Cape	
Raseriti Tau	ANC	Northern Cape	
Malesane Themba	ANC	Mpumalanga	
Elizabeth van Lingen	DA	Eastern Cape	
Darryl Worth	DA	Free State	
Muntukaphiwana Zulu	IFP	KwaZulu-Natal	

== Vacancies and replacements ==
This table lists changes in the membership of the National Council of Provinces as of 9 December 2013.

Party	Province	Seat vacated by	Date of vacancy	Replaced by	Date of replacement
DA	KwaZulu-Natal	Dean MacPherson	29 May 2009	Alf Lees	11 June 2009
DA	Western Cape	Tim Harris	9 September 2010	Theodorus Barnardus Beylevedt	12 October 2010
DA	Gauteng	Sherry Su-Huei Cheng	30 September 2010	Beverley Abrahams	1 October 2010
DA	Western Cape	Theo Beyleveldt	10 July 2011	Denis Joseph	20 October 2011
DA	Mpumalanga	Watty Watson	7 November 2011	Velly Makasana Manzini	8 November 2011
ANC	Limpopo	Tlhalefi Andries Mashamaite	8 May 2012	Thabo Makunyane	22 May 2012
ANC	Eastern Cape	Siphiwe Sam Mazosiwe	27 March 2013	Zukisa Faku	25 April 2013
ANC	North West	Collen Maine	25 June 2013	Kesenkamang Veronica Kekesi	13 August 2013
DA	Mpumalanga	Velly Makasana Manzini	28 November 2013	Sonja Boshoff	3 December 2013
