= Jomo Nyambi =

South African politician

The Honourable Jomo Nyambi MP

Delegate to the National Council of Provinces

Assembly Member for Mpumalanga
- Incumbent
- Assumed office 7 May 2009

Member of the National Assembly
- In office 24 July 2006 – May 2009
- Constituency: Mpumalanga

Personal details
- Born: Archibold Jomo Nyambi; 28 November 1972 (age 53)
- Citizenship: South Africa
- Party: African National Congress

Archibold Jomo Nyambi (born 28 November 1972) is a South African politician from Mpumalanga. He has been House Chairperson of Committees in the National Council of Provinces (NCOP) since 2014. Before joining the NCOP in 2009, he served in the National Assembly from 2006 to 2009.

Nyambi is a member of the African National Congress (ANC). A teacher by training, he rose to political prominence through the ANC Youth League and South African Students Congress in Mpumalanga.

== Early political career ==
Born on 28 November 1972, Nyambi became politically engaged in around 1988 as a student at Mjokwane Secondary School in Kamaqhekeza in the former kaNgwane bantustan (now part of Mpumalanga). He was the president of the school's student representative council and was influenced by his elder brother, who went into exile with the anti-apartheid movement.

After leaving high school, Nyambi qualified as a teacher and taught at schools in his home village, while remaining active in politics. After the African National Congress (ANC) was unbanned by the apartheid government in 1990, Nyambi became involved in local and regional structures of the newly established ANC Youth League (ANCYL). He was the inaugural chairperson of the league's regional branch in Nkomazi. He also chaired the local branch of the South African Students Congress (SASCO) at Mgwenya College of Education and he was ultimately promoted to serve as convenor for sports education in SASCO's Mpumalanga provincial branch. He was elected to the Provincial Executive Committee of the Mpumalanga ANCYL in 1998, and in 2002 he was elected as its Provincial Treasurer. He held the latter position until 2008, when his age disqualified him from continued membership in the league.

In 2003, Nyambi left teaching to become parliamentary liaison officer for Candith Mashego-Dlamini, who was Member of the Executive Council for Public Works in the Mpumalanga Provincial Government. He was subsequently promoted to become chief of staff in Mashego-Dlamini's office.

== Legislative career ==
Nyambi joined Parliament on 24 July 2006, when he was sworn in to the Mpumalanga caucus of the National Assembly; he filled the casual vacancy arising from Garth Mngomezulu's resignation. At the next general election in 2009, he was elected to represent Mpumalanga as a Permanent Delegate to the National Council of Provinces (NCOP). He was also elected to chair the NCOP's Select Committee on Petitions and Members' Legislative Proposals, a position he held throughout the 25th Parliament. During this period, Nyambi also campaigned for election as regional chairperson of the ANC's branch in Ehlanzeni, though he lost to Ngrayi Ngwenya, the favoured candidate of Mpumalanga Premier David Mabuza.

Nyambi was re-elected to his seat in the NCOP in 2014 and 2019. At the outset of the 26th Parliament in 2014, he was appointed as House Chairperson of Committees (Chair of Chairs) in the NCOP, and he was retained in that position after the 2019 election. In May 2023, he was elected as co-chairperson of Parliament's Joint Ad Hoc Committee on Flood Disaster Relief and Recovery, established to oversee government's response to the 2023 South African floods; he shared the chair with Cedric Frolick, his counterpart in the National Assembly.
