= Mpumalanga (National Assembly of South Africa constituency) =

Multi-member constituent of the National Assembly of South Africa

- iMpumalanga
- Constituency for the National Assembly of South Africa
- Location of Mpumalanga within South Africa
- Province: Mpumalanga
- Population: 4,679,786 (2020)
- Electorate: 1,951,776 (2019)

Current constituency
- Created: 1994
- Seats: List: 15 (2009–present); 14 (–2009)
- Members of the National Assembly: List: Bongani Bongo (ANC); Mmatlala Grace Boroto (ANC); Sindisiwe Chikunga (ANC); Doris Eunice Dlakude (ANC); Sthembile Altia Hlongo (ANC); Angel Khanyile (DA); Henro Krüger (DA); Ronald Lamola (ANC); Fish Mahlalela (ANC); David Mahlobo (ANC); Lusizo Makhubela-Mashele (ANC); Valentia Thokozile Malinga (ANC); Vuyisile Promise Malomane (ANC); Reneiloe Mashabela (EFF); Candith Mashego-Dlamini (ANC); Timothy Victor Mashele (ANC); Thabile Sylvia Masondo (ANC); Elphus Fani Mathebula (ANC); Simanga Happy Mbuyane (ANC); Reginah Mhaule (ANC); Desmond Moela (ANC); Dumisani Mthenjane (EFF); Mbuyiseni Ndlozi (EFF); Henry Shembeni (EFF); Elvis Kholwana Siwela (ANC); Violet Sizani Siwela (ANC); Gijimani Skosana (ANC); Grace Kekulu Tseke (ANC); Annerie Weber (DA)

Mpumalanga (Swazi: iMpumalanga) is one of the nine multi-member constituencies of the National Assembly of South Africa, the lower house of the Parliament of South Africa, the national legislature of South Africa. The constituency was established as Eastern Transvaal in 1994 when the National Assembly was established by the Interim Constitution following the end of Apartheid. It was renamed Mpumalanga in 1999. It is conterminous with the province of Mpumalanga. The constituency currently elects 15 of the 400 members of the National Assembly using the closed party-list proportional representation electoral system. At the 2019 general election it had 1,951,776 registered electors.

== Electoral system ==
Mpumalanga currently elects 15 of the 400 members of the National Assembly using the closed party-list proportional representation electoral system. Constituency seats are allocated using the largest remainder method with a Droop quota.

== Election results ==
=== Summary ===
Election	Pan Africanist Congress PAC			United Democratic Movement UDM			African National Congress ANC			Democratic Alliance DA/DP			New National Party NNP/NP			African Christian Democratic Party ACDP			Inkatha Freedom Party IFP			Economic Freedom Fighters EFF			Freedom Front Plus VF+/VFFF/VV-FF		
Election	Votes	%	Seats	Votes	%	Seats	Votes	%	Seats	Votes	%	Seats	Votes	%	Seats	Votes	%	Seats	Votes	%	Seats	Votes	%	Seats	Votes	%	Seats
2019	1,516	0.12%	0	982	0.08%	0	918,756	72.23%	12	116,050	9.12%	1				6,375	0.50%	0	5,786	0.45%	0	146,426	11.51%	2	33,842	2.66%	0
2014	2,640	0.19%	0	1,995	0.14%	0	1,091,642	78.80%	13	139,158	10.04%	1				5,173	0.37%	0	4,143	0.30%	0	85,203	6.15%	1	11,707	0.85%	0
2009	3,509	0.26%	0	3,159	0.24%	0	1,152,698	85.81%	14	102,039	7.60%	1				6,880	0.51%	0	7,286	0.54%	0				11,151	0.83%	0
2004	8,675	0.76%	0	11,480	1.01%	0	979,155	86.34%	13	81,313	7.17%	1	4,878	0.43%	0	11,321	1.00%	0	11,730	1.03%	0				12,025	1.06%	0
1999	6,946	0.61%	0	15,869	1.40%	0	965,886	85.29%	13	56,118	4.96%	1	26,790	2.37%	0	12,453	1.10%	0	15,964	1.41%	0				14,688	1.30%	0
1994	17,800	1.36%					1,072,518	81.87%		5,492	0.42%		134,511	10.27%		4,474	0.34%		20,872	1.59%					45,964	3.51%	

=== Detailed ===
==== 2024 ====
Results of the regional ballot for Mpumalanga in the 2024 general election held on 29 May 2024:

Party/Candidate	Votes	%	Seats	+/–
African National Congress	585,811	51.25	8	–4
uMkhonto weSizwe	191,869	16.79	3	New
Economic Freedom Fighters	160,425	14.04	2	0
Democratic Alliance	136,575	11.95	2	+1
Freedom Front Plus	18,136	1.59	0	0
ActionSA	5,990	0.52	0	New
United Africans Transformation	5,587	0.49	0	New
African Christian Democratic Party	5,301	0.46	0	0
African Transformation Movement	5,014	0.44	0	0
Inkatha Freedom Party	4,912	0.43	0	0
African People's Convention	3,551	0.31	0	0
Patriotic Alliance	3,153	0.28	0	0
Build One South Africa	2,762	0.24	0	New
Rise Mzansi	1,993	0.17	0	New
Azanian People's Organisation	1,548	0.14	0	0
Pan Africanist Congress of Azania	1,403	0.12	0	0
United Independent Movement	1,351	0.12	0	New
Alliance of Citizens for Change	999	0.09	0	New
Congress of the People	922	0.08	0	0
United Democratic Movement	855	0.07	0	0
Forum for Service Delivery	673	0.06	0	0
Economic Liberators Forum South Africa	565	0.05	0	New
South African Rainbow Alliance	551	0.05	0	New
Good	426	0.04	0	0
National Freedom Party	419	0.04	0	0
Citizans	393	0.03	0	New
People's Movement for Change	310	0.03	0	New
Organic Humanity Movement	296	0.03	0	New
Africa Restoration Alliance	263	0.02	0	New
Sizwe Ummah Nation	252	0.02	0	New
Able Leadership	242	0.02	0	New
Africa Africans Reclaim	230	0.02	0	New
Free Democrats	169	0.01	0	0
Total	1,142,946	100.00	15	–
Valid votes	1,142,946	98.88		
Invalid/blank votes	12,934	1.12		
Total votes	1,155,880	100.00		
Registered voters/turnout	2,025,070	57.08		

The following candidates were elected.

Name	Party
Juliet Khumalo	ANC
Damien Klopper	DA
Henro Krüger	DA
Sipho Mahlangu	ANC
Lusizo Makhubela-Mashele	ANC
Mzwanele Manyi (Note: Appointed on 23 August 2024 to replace the candidate originally elected, who was not available.)	MK
Tim Mashele	ANC
Constance Mkhonto	EFF
Busisiwe Mkhwebane	EFF
Julian Mokoena	ANC
Ethel Nkosi	ANC
Hlonono Selepe	MK
Fisani Shabangu	ANC
Gijimani Skosana	ANC
Albert Themba	MK

==== 2019 ====
Results of the national ballot for Mpumalanga in the 2019 general election held on 8 May 2019:

Party	Votes	%	Seats	+/–
African National Congress	918,756	72.23	12	–1
Economic Freedom Fighters	146,426	11.51	2	+1
Democratic Alliance	116,050	9.12	1	0
Freedom Front Plus	33,842	2.66	0	0
Better Residents Association	6,971	0.55	0	0
African Christian Democratic Party	6,375	0.50	0	0
African Transformation Movement	5,982	0.47	0	New
Inkatha Freedom Party	5,786	0.45	0	0
African Independent Congress	3,945	0.31	0	0
African People's Convention	3,358	0.26	0	0
South African National Congress of Traditional Authorities	2,336	0.18	0	New
African Security Congress	2,207	0.17	0	New
Congress of the People	1,947	0.15	0	0
Socialist Revolutionary Workers Party	1,797	0.14	0	New
Afrikan Alliance of Social Democrats	1,591	0.13	0	New
Pan Africanist Congress of Azania	1,516	0.12	0	0
National Freedom Party	1,499	0.12	0	0
Black First Land First	1,259	0.10	0	New
Agang South Africa	1,151	0.09	0	0
United Democratic Movement	982	0.08	0	0
Forum for Service Delivery	821	0.06	0	New
Economic Emancipation Forum	742	0.06	0	New
Good	565	0.04	0	New
Front National	528	0.04	0	0
Al Jama-ah	527	0.04	0	0
African Covenant	455	0.04	0	New
Azanian People's Organisation	450	0.04	0	0
International Revelation Congress	387	0.03	0	New
Power of Africans Unity	372	0.03	0	New
Capitalist Party of South Africa	365	0.03	0	New
Christian Political Movement	278	0.02	0	New
Alliance for Transformation for All	266	0.02	0	New
Democratic Liberal Congress	210	0.02	0	New
Compatriots of South Africa	205	0.02	0	New
African Congress of Democrats	203	0.02	0	New
African Renaissance Unity Party	197	0.02	0	New
African Content Movement	190	0.01	0	New
African Democratic Change	185	0.01	0	New
Women Forward	185	0.01	0	0
National People's Front	158	0.01	0	New
Minority Front	157	0.01	0	0
Free Democrats	147	0.01	0	New
Patriotic Alliance	125	0.01	0	0
People's Revolutionary Movement	116	0.01	0	New
National People's Ambassadors	110	0.01	0	New
Land Party	98	0.01	0	New
Independent Civic Organisation of South Africa	94	0.01	0	0
South African Maintenance and Estate Beneficiaries Association	67	0.01	0	New
Total	1,271,979	100.00	15	–
Valid votes	1,271,979	98.53		
Invalid/blank votes	18,929	1.47		
Total votes	1,290,908	100.00		
Registered voters/turnout	1,951,776	66.14		

The following candidates were elected: Doris Eunice Dlakude (ANC), Sthembile Altia Hlongo (ANC), Angel Khanyile (DA), Lusizo Makhubela-Mashele (ANC), Valentia Thokozile Malinga (ANC), Vuyisile Promise Malomane (ANC), Reneiloe Mashabela (EFF), Timothy Victor Mashele (ANC), Thabile Sylvia Masondo (ANC), Elphus Fani Mathebula (ANC), Simanga Happy Mbuyane (ANC), Mbuyiseni Ndlozi (EFF), Elvis Kholwana Siwela (ANC), Gijimani Skosana (ANC) and Grace Kekulu Tseke (ANC).

==== 2014 ====
Results of the 2014 general election held on 7 May 2014:

Party		Votes	%	Seats
African National Congress	ANC	1,091,642	78.80%	13
Democratic Alliance	DA	139,158	10.04%	1
Economic Freedom Fighters	EFF	85,203	6.15%	1
Bushbuckridge Residents Association	BRA	12,208	0.88%	0
Freedom Front Plus	VF+	11,707	0.85%	0
National Freedom Party	NFP	9,312	0.67%	0
African Independent Congress	AIC	7,072	0.51%	0
African Christian Democratic Party	ACDP	5,173	0.37%	0
African People's Convention	APC	4,269	0.31%	0
Inkatha Freedom Party	IFP	4,143	0.30%	0
Congress of the People	COPE	3,931	0.28%	0
Pan Africanist Congress of Azania	PAC	2,640	0.19%	0
United Democratic Movement	UDM	1,995	0.14%	0
Agang South Africa	AGANG SA	1,738	0.13%	0
Azanian People's Organisation	AZAPO	1,156	0.08%	0
United Christian Democratic Party	UCDP	661	0.05%	0
Al Jama-ah		596	0.04%	0
Workers and Socialist Party	WASP	448	0.03%	0
Front National	FN	428	0.03%	0
Patriotic Alliance	PA	330	0.02%	0
Pan Africanist Movement	PAM	277	0.02%	0
Ubuntu Party	UBUNTU	274	0.02%	0
Keep It Straight and Simple Party	KISS	201	0.01%	0
Minority Front	MF	187	0.01%	0
First Nation Liberation Alliance	FINLA	165	0.01%	0
Independent Civic Organisation of South Africa	ICOSA	144	0.01%	0
United Congress	UNICO	128	0.01%	0
Kingdom Governance Movement	KGM	125	0.01%	0
Peoples Alliance	PAL	96	0.01%	0
Valid Votes		1,385,407	100.00%	15
Rejected Votes		22,862	1.62%	
Total Polled		1,408,269	75.68%	
Registered Electors		1,860,834		

The following candidates were elected: Bongani Bongo (ANC), Mmatlala Grace Boroto (ANC), Sindisiwe Chikunga (ANC), Doris Eunice Dlakude (ANC), Dalton Hlamalani Khosa (ANC), Nicholous Pro Khoza (EFF), Henro Krüger (DA), Duduzile Promise Manana (ANC), Derick Mnguni (ANC), Nokhaya Adelaide Mnisi (ANC), Mogotle Friddah Nkadimeng (ANC), Hlakudi Frans Nkoana (ANC), Goodwill Sbusiso Radebe (ANC), Elvis Kholwana Siwela (ANC) and Gijimani Skosana (ANC).

==== 2009 ====
Results of the 2009 general election held on 22 April 2009:

Party		Votes	%	Seats
African National Congress	ANC	1,152,698	85.81%	14
Democratic Alliance	DA	102,039	7.60%	1
Congress of the People	COPE	38,802	2.89%	0
Freedom Front Plus	VF+	11,151	0.83%	0
Inkatha Freedom Party	IFP	7,286	0.54%	0
African Christian Democratic Party	ACDP	6,880	0.51%	0
African People's Convention	APC	4,421	0.33%	0
Pan Africanist Congress of Azania	PAC	3,509	0.26%	0
United Democratic Movement	UDM	3,159	0.24%	0
Movement Democratic Party	MDP	2,915	0.22%	0
Azanian People's Organisation	AZAPO	2,698	0.20%	0
Independent Democrats	ID	1,619	0.12%	0
United Christian Democratic Party	UCDP	849	0.06%	0
Al Jama-ah		756	0.06%	0
National Democratic Convention	NADECO	728	0.05%	0
Christian Democratic Alliance	CDA	558	0.04%	0
South African Democratic Congress	SADECO	535	0.04%	0
Great Kongress of South Africa	GKSA	478	0.04%	0
United Independent Front	UIF	384	0.03%	0
New Vision Party	NVP	371	0.03%	0
Alliance of Free Democrats	AFD	315	0.02%	0
Minority Front	MF	286	0.02%	0
Pan Africanist Movement	PAM	216	0.02%	0
Women Forward	WF	208	0.02%	0
A Party		204	0.02%	0
Keep It Straight and Simple Party	KISS	188	0.01%	0
Valid Votes		1,343,253	100.00%	15
Rejected Votes		20,583	1.51%	
Total Polled		1,363,836	80.38%	
Registered Electors		1,696,705		

The following candidates were elected: Lourie Bosman (DA), Sindisiwe Chikunga (ANC), Christopher Lancaster Gololo (ANC), Eric Kholwane (ANC), Vuselelo Vincent Magagula (ANC), Mduduzi Comfort Manana (ANC), Buoang Lemias Mashile (ANC), Nokhaya Adelaide Mnisi (ANC), Dumisile Goodness Nhlengethwa (ANC), Mtombizodwa Florence Nyanda (ANC), Goodwill Sbusiso Radebe (ANC), Khellinah Nomvula Shoba (ANC), Gijimani Skosana (ANC), Grace Kekulu Tseke (ANC) and Adrian John Williams (ANC).

==== 2004 ====
Results of the 2004 general election held on 14 April 2004:

Party		Votes	%	Seats
African National Congress	ANC	979,155	86.34%	13
Democratic Alliance	DA	81,313	7.17%	1
Freedom Front Plus	VF+	12,025	1.06%	0
Inkatha Freedom Party	IFP	11,730	1.03%	0
United Democratic Movement	UDM	11,480	1.01%	0
African Christian Democratic Party	ACDP	11,321	1.00%	0
Pan Africanist Congress of Azania	PAC	8,675	0.76%	0
New National Party	NNP	4,878	0.43%	0
Independent Democrats	ID	3,927	0.35%	0
Azanian People's Organisation	AZAPO	2,149	0.19%	0
United Christian Democratic Party	UCDP	1,795	0.16%	0
Socialist Party of Azania	SOPA	1,056	0.09%	0
National Action	NA	740	0.07%	0
Employment Movement for South Africa	EMSA	719	0.06%	0
Christian Democratic Party	CDP	662	0.06%	0
United Front	UF	626	0.06%	0
Peace and Justice Congress	PJC	606	0.05%	0
The Organisation Party	TOP	411	0.04%	0
Minority Front	MF	298	0.03%	0
Keep It Straight and Simple Party	KISS	263	0.02%	0
New Labour Party		263	0.02%	0
Valid Votes		1,134,092	100.00%	14
Rejected Votes		23,871	2.06%	
Total Polled		1,157,963	80.28%	
Registered Electors		1,442,469		

The following candidates were elected: Sindisiwe Chikunga (ANC), Christopher Lancaster Gololo (ANC), Eric Kholwane (ANC), Zunaid Kotwal (ANC), Millicent Ntombizodwa Sibongile Manana (ANC), Piet Mohlamme Mathebe (ANC), Garth Piet Mngomezulu (ANC), Dumisile Goodness Nhlengethwa (ANC), Bongi Maria Ntuli (ANC), Priscilla Sindisiwe Sekgobela (ANC), Mtikeni Patrick Sibande (ANC), Jonas Ben Sibanyoni (ANC), Sipho Siboza (ANC) and Hilda Weber (DA).

==== 1999 ====
Results of the 1999 general election held on 2 June 1999:

Party		Votes	%	Seats
African National Congress	ANC	965,886	85.29%	13
Democratic Party	DP	56,118	4.96%	1
New National Party	NNP	26,790	2.37%	0
Inkatha Freedom Party	IFP	15,964	1.41%	0
United Democratic Movement	UDM	15,869	1.40%	0
Freedom Front	VFFF	14,688	1.30%	0
African Christian Democratic Party	ACDP	12,453	1.10%	0
Federal Alliance	FA	8,482	0.75%	0
Pan Africanist Congress of Azania	PAC	6,946	0.61%	0
Afrikaner Eenheidsbeweging	AEB	4,260	0.38%	0
United Christian Democratic Party	UCDP	2,394	0.21%	0
Azanian People's Organisation	AZAPO	1,062	0.09%	0
Socialist Party of Azania	SOPA	519	0.05%	0
Abolition of Income Tax and Usury Party	AITUP	439	0.04%	0
Minority Front	MF	401	0.04%	0
Government by the People Green Party	GPGP	246	0.02%	0
Valid Votes		1,132,517	100.00%	14
Rejected Votes		24,712	2.14%	
Total Polled		1,157,229	90.57%	
Registered Electors		1,277,783		

==== 1994 ====
Results of the national ballot for Mpumalanga in the 1994 general election held between 26 and 29 April 1994:

Party	Votes	%	Seats
African National Congress	1,072,518	81.87	12
National Party	134,511	10.27	2
Freedom Front	45,964	3.51	0
Inkatha Freedom Party	20,872	1.59	0
Pan Africanist Congress of Azania	17,800	1.36	0
Democratic Party	5,492	0.42	0
African Christian Democratic Party	4,474	0.34	0
African Moderates Congress Party	2,625	0.20	0
Africa Muslim Party	906	0.07	0
Dikwankwetla Party of South Africa	834	0.06	0
Sport Organisation for Collective Contributions and Equal Rights	636	0.05	0
African Democratic Movement	611	0.05	0
Federal Party	527	0.04	0
Minority Front	503	0.04	0
Ximoko Progressive Party	416	0.03	0
Keep It Straight and Simple Party	415	0.03	0
Women's Rights Peace Party	311	0.02	0
Workers' List Party	309	0.02	0
Luso-South African Party	269	0.02	0
Total	1,309,993	100.00	14
Valid votes	1,309,993	98.75	
Invalid/blank votes	16,614	1.25	
Total votes	1,326,607	100.00	
