= Claudia Ndaba =

South African politician

Chairperson of the Portfolio Committee on Women, Youth and People with Disabilities
- In office 2 July 2019 – 17 June 2024
- Preceded by: Thandi Memela

Member of the National Assembly of South Africa
- In office 21 May 2014 – 28 May 2024

Member of the Gauteng Provincial Legislature
- In office 6 May 2009 – 6 May 2014

Personal details
- Born: 30 July 1968 (age 58)
- Party: African National Congress
- Education: University of Pretoria
- Profession: Politician

Claudia Nonhlanhla Ndaba (born 30 July 1968) is a South African politician. A member of the African National Congress, she served as the Chairperson of the Portfolio Committee on Women, Youth and People with Disabilities from 2019 until 2024 and a Member of the National Assembly of South Africa from 2014 until 2024. She served as Chairperson of the Ad Hoc Committee on the Filling of Vacancies in the Commission for Gender Equality twice during her first term in parliament. Prior to her election to parliament, Ndaba served as a Member of the Gauteng Provincial Legislature from 2009 to 2014.

== Early life and education ==
Ndaba was born on 30 July 1968. Growing up, her uncles were members of the African National Congress's military wing, UMkhonto we Sizwe. She enrolled at the Ann Latsky Nursing College in Johannesburg in 2002 and trained to become a professionally enrolled nurse and completed her training in 2004. In 2021, she graduated from the University of Pretoria with a Bachelor of Public Administration.

== Career ==
After graduating from the Ann Latsky Nursing College, her nursing career did not take off as she expected due to her appointment as an administrative secretary in the office of the Deputy Minister of Trade and Industry.

== Political career ==
In 2009, Ndaba was elected to the Gauteng Provincial Legislature as an ANC representative. She was elected deputy provincial secretary of the African National Congress Women's League in 2012, a position she held until 2015. She was also a member of the National Executive Committee of the women's league.

Ndaba was elected as a member of the National Assembly at the 2014 general election from the ANC's Gauteng list. She was named to the Portfolio Committee on Health. In 2015, she was elected to serve on the National Working Committee of the ANC's women's league. In November 2016, she was elected chairperson of the Ad Hoc Committee on the Filling of Vacancies for Gender Equality. Ndaba became an alternate member of the Ad Hoc Committee on Funding of Political Parties on 21 June 2017.

Between October and November 2017, she was a member of the Portfolio Committee on Economic Development, before becoming an alternate member of the portfolio committee. The Ad Hoc Committee on the Filling of Vacancies in the Commission for Gender Equality was reestablished in 2018 and Ndaba was elected chairperson again unopposed, despite opposition members nominating fellow ANC MP Grace Tseke. Tseke declined the nomination.

In 2019, Ndaba was re-elected to the National Assembly, this time as a candidate on the ANC's national list. Following the election, she was elected to serve on the Portfolio Committee on Women, Youth and People with Disabilities. Ndaba was elected chairperson of the committee, succeeding Thandi Memela, who left parliament at the election.
