= Committee for Section 194 Enquiry =

South African National Assembly committee

The Committee for Section 194 Enquiry is an ad hoc committee of the National Assembly of South Africa that was established on 7 April 2021 to determine if there are grounds for the removal of Advocate Busisiwe Mkhwebane as Public Protector.

== Background ==
In February 2020, the Chief Whip of the Official Opposition, Natasha Mazzone, submitted a motion to the Speaker of the National Assembly, Thandi Modise, with regards to Rule 129R of the National Assembly rules for the initiation of proceedings, more particularly an inquiry to establish whether or not Advocate Busisiwe Mkhwebane should be removed from office as Public Protector on the basis of misconduct and/or incompetence.

After the declaration by the Speaker that Mazzone's motion was in order, she appointed a three-member independent panel headed by retired Constitutional Court justice Bess Nkabinde and consisting of advocate Dumisa Ntsebeza and academic Johan de Waal on 25 November 2020 to conduct and finalise a preliminary assessment to determine whether there is prima facie evidence showing that the Public Protector is not fit to hold office. Mkhwebane did attempt to stop the formation of the panel and approached the Western Cape High Court but her application was dismissed. On 6 December 2020, Modise granted an extension to the panel and extended its mandate from 30 days to 90 days. Modise received the panel's report on 25 February 2021. On 1 March 2021, the report was released and it found prima facie evidence of incompetence and misconduct on the part of Mkhwebane. The panel also recommended that the charges, based on the findings, be referred to a committee of the National Assembly to investigate.

== Legislative history ==
During a sitting of the National Assembly on 16 March 2021, the House approved the establishment of a special committee to conduct an inquiry into Mkhwebane's fitness to hold office. The vote went as follows with 275 MPs voting in support, 40 MPs voting against, and one abstaining. The majority of the "for" votes came from the African National Congress (ANC) and the Democratic Alliance (DA). The Economic Freedom Fighters (EFF), the United Democratic Movement (UDM), the African Transformation Movement (ATM) and Al Jama-ah voted against it. The Pan Africanist Congress of Azania and the African Independent Congress were absent.

== Membership ==
On 7 April 2021, the ad-hoc committee was established with parties represented in the National Assembly appointing members to serve on the committee. The Rules Committee resolved that the committee should consist of 26 members: 11 voting members and 15 non-voting members. Only five (the ANC, DA, EFF, IFP and FF Plus) out of the fourteen parties in the National Assembly had voting members. UDM leader Bantu Holomisa complained about smaller parties not having a vote. The Rules Committee of the National Assembly met on 5 May to consider giving smaller parties voting rights, however, the ANC, DA and FF Plus opposed the idea. Holomisa then wrote to Modise again and Modise then decided to expand the committee membership. On 25 May 2021, the Rules Committee unanimously agreed to Modise's decision to expand the membership of the committee to 36 members to give all political parties in the National Assembly proportional voting rights.

All 36 members of the committee will have voting rights and the proportional membership will be as follows: 19 members from the African National Congress, 4 members from the Democratic Alliance, two members from the Economic Freedom Fighters and 1 member each from the Inkatha Freedom Party, the African Christian Democratic Party, the National Freedom Party, the Freedom Front Plus, the United Democratic Movement, Good, the African Independent Congress, the Congress of the People, the Pan Africanist Congress of Azania and Al Jama-ah. The African Transformation Movement was also allocated a voting member, despite them saying that they did not want to participate in the committee.

As of 21 June 2021, the members of the committee are as follows:

Party	Member
Good	Shaun August
VF+	Heloïse Denner (Alternate)
ANC	Dorries Dlakude
ANC	Qubudile Dyantyi (Chairperson)
Al Jama-ah	Ganief Hendricks
ANC	Judy Hermans
UDM	Bantu Holomisa
ANC	Tina Joemat-Pettersson
ANC	Thanduxolo Khalipha
ANC	Tdimalo Legwase
DA	Annelie Lotriet
ANC	Sahlulele Luzipo
COPE	Willie Madisha
ANC	Mikateko Mahlaule
IFP	Zandile Majozi
EFF	Julius Malema
ANC	Jane Mananiso
ANC	Boyce Maneli (Alternate)
EFF	Omphile Maotwe
DA	Zakhele Mbhele (Alternate)
ANC	Teliswa Mgweba
DA	Kevin Mileham
IFP	Christian Msimang (Alternate)
VF+	Corné Mulder
ANC	Simon Nkosi
DA	Baxolile Nodada
ANC	Xola Nqola
ANC	Dipuo Peters
DA	Leon Schreiber
ANC	Albert Seabi
NFP	Munzoor Shaik Emam
ANC	Violet Siwela
ANC	Gijimani Skosana (Alternate)
ACDP	Marie Sukers
ANC	Manketsi Tlhape
ANC	Nokuzola Tolashe
ANC	Grace Tseke (Alternate)
DA	Benedicta van Minnen (Alternate)
