= Tshilidzi Munyai =

South African politician

Tshilidzi Munyai MPL

Member of the Gauteng Provincial Legislature
- Incumbent
- Assumed office 2 February 2023

Acting Chairperson of the Portfolio Committee on Health
- In office 18 August 2021 – 31 August 2021
- Preceded by: Sibongiseni Dhlomo
- Succeeded by: Kenneth Jacobs

Member of the National Assembly of South Africa
- In office 22 May 2019 – 31 January 2023
- Succeeded by: Paul Mashatile
- Constituency: Gauteng

Personal details
- Born: Tshilidzi Bethuel Munyai
- Party: African National Congress

Tshilidzi Bethuel Munyai is a South African politician who was elected as an African National Congress Member of the National Assembly of South Africa in 2019. In August 2021, Munyai served as the acting chairperson of the Portfolio Committee on Health. He resigned from Parliament in January 2023 and was subsequently sworn in as a member of the Gauteng Provincial Legislature.

== Biography ==
Munyai holds a Bachelor of Administration (Honours) in Public Policy as well as a certificate in International Relations and Political Economy from the London School of Economics. A member of the African National Congress, he served as head of election research and as chair of the ideology, political education and training sub-committee at the Walter Sisulu Leadership Academy. Munyai has also served as the regional secretary of the ANC in the party's Ekurhuleni region in Gauteng. He is currently a member of the Provincial Executive Committee of the ANC in Gauteng.

== Parliamentary career ==
He stood as an ANC parliamentary candidate in the 2019 national elections and was elected to the National Assembly. He was then appointed to the Portfolio Committee on Health. On 18 August 2021, Munyai was elected as the acting chairperson of the committee following Sibongiseni Dhlomo's appointment as Deputy Minister. He served until Kenneth Jacobs's election as chair on 31 August.

On 30 January 2023, it was reported that Munyai and fellow ANC MP Mervyn Dirks had resigned from the National Assembly amid talks of a cabinet reshuffle by President Ramaphosa. Newly elected ANC deputy president Paul Mashatile was selected to fill the casual vacancy created by his resignation. Munyai was sworn in as a member of the Gauteng Provincial Legislature on 2 February 2023.
