= Portfolio Committee on Police =

Portfolio committee in the National Assembly of the Parliament of South Africa

- Formation: 1994; 32 years ago
- Purpose: Oversight of the South African Police Service
- Chairperson: Ian Cameron (DA)
- Parent organisation: National Assembly of South Africa

The Portfolio Committee on Police (formerly the Portfolio Committee on Safety and Security) is a portfolio committee of the National Assembly of South Africa. It is responsible for oversight of the agencies managed by the Minister of Police, including the South African Police Service.

== Mandate ==
The committee oversees the Department of Police and the South African Police Service (SAPS) and other statutory entities, including the Independent Police Investigative Directorate (IPID), the Civilian Secretariat for Police Service, the Private Security Industry Regulatory Authority (PSIRA), the National Forensic Oversight and Ethics Board (DNA Board), and the Office of the DPCI Judge.

== List of chairpersons ==
Session	Chairperson	Party	Election date	Citation
7th Parliament	Ian Cameron	DA	10 July 2024	
6th Parliament	Nocks Seabi	ANC	6 September 2023	
6th Parliament	Tina Joemat-Pettersson	ANC	2 July 2019	
5th Parliament	Francois Beukman	ANC	25 June 2014	
4th Parliament	Annelizé van Wyk	ANC	2013	
4th Parliament	Sindy Chikunga	ANC	1 June 2009	
3rd Parliament	Maggie Sotyu	ANC	24 June 2004	
2nd Parliament	Mluleki George	ANC	16 August 1999	
1st Parliament	Rapu Molekane	ANC	1994	
