= Francois Beukman =

South African attorney and former politician

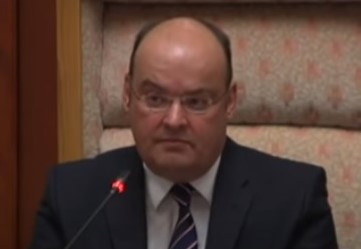
- Beukman in 2019

Chairperson of the Portfolio Committee on Police
- In office 24 June 2014 – 7 May 2019
- Preceded by: Annelize van Wyk
- Succeeded by: Tina Joemat-Pettersson

Chairperson of the Standing Committee on Public Accounts
- In office 5 March 2002 – 30 September 2005
- Preceded by: Gavin Woods
- Succeeded by: Themba Godi

Member of the National Assembly of South Africa
- In office 21 May 2014 – 7 May 2019
- In office 1999–2009

Personal details
- Born: 1965 or 1966 (age 59–60)
- Party: African National Congress (2005–present)
- Other political affiliations: New National Party (Until 2005)
- Education: Paarl Boys' High School
- Alma mater: University of Stellenbosch (MA); University of South Africa (B.Proc, LLB)
- Profession: Attorney

Francois Beukman is a South African attorney and former politician who served as a Member of the National Assembly of South Africa from 1999 to 2009 and again from 2014 to 2019.

He was first elected to Parliament as a member of the now-defunct New National Party in 1999 and served as the Chairperson of the Standing Committee on Public Accounts from 2001 to 2004. Beukman joined the African National Congress in 2005 when the NNP merged into it. After leaving parliament in 2009, he served as executive director of the Independent Complaints Directorate from 2009 until 2012. Beukman was elected back to the National Assembly in 2014 and was appointed to chair the Portfolio Committee on Police. He left Parliament in 2019.

== Early life and education ==
Beukman matriculated from Paarl Boys' High School in 1983 before going on to study at the University of Stellenbosch from which he graduated with a Bachelor of Arts in Political Science and Public Administration in 1986, an Honours degree in Political Science in 1989 and a Master of Arts in Political Science and Government in 1990. Beukman earned an BProc Law degree in 1996 and a Bachelor of Laws in 2006, both degrees from the University of South Africa. In 1997, Beukman was admitted as an attorney.

== Early career ==
Beukman was a senior constitutional planner in the Department of Constitutional Development during the multiparty negotiation process. He was a representative of the Department of Justice and Constitutional Development in Cape Town during the final two years of the Constitutional Assembly. He left the department in 1995, proceeding to work for the private sector and law firms, and was the director of a law firm.

== Parliamentary career ==
=== First two terms: 1999–2009 ===
In the 1999 general election, Beukman was elected to the National Assembly of South Africa as a representative of the New National Party. By 2001, he was the NNP Federal Council spokesperson. He was head of the NNP's media department and was regarded as one of the party's newer generation MPs.

A year after the Democratic Alliance was formed out of a merger of the NNP and the Democratic Party, DA leader Tony Leon appointed him and DP MP Raenette Taljaard to the influential Standing Committee on Public Accounts in 2001, but he resigned from the committee when the NNP withdrew from the DA. Nonetheless, Beukman was reappointed to the committee and elected chairperson of the committee in April 2002 after the NNP and the ruling African National Congress signed a co-operation agreement. He succeeded Gavin Woods, who resigned from the position earlier in the year and defeated DP MP Nigel Bruce in a voice vote. MPs from opposition parties described him as an "ANC lackey". After the 2004 general election, the ANC initially announced that one of its members, Vincent Smith would chair the SCOPA committee. However, the ANC soon backtracked and announced that Beukman would remain as SCOPA chairperson. Beukman resigned as committee chairperson after he and other NNP MPs defected to the ANC during the 2005 floor-crossing window period. Beukman continued serving as an ANC Member of Parliament until the 2009 general election.

=== Third term: 2014–2019 ===
Beukman stood as an ANC parliamentary candidate in the 2014 general elections and was elected back to the National Assembly. He was elected to chair the Portfolio Committee on Police. In August 2017, Beukman called for experienced police officers to be retained and added that it is critical to have the needed resources to manage crime, instead of focusing on manpower.

In May 2018, Beukman welcomed Advocate Godfrey Lebeya's appointment as the head of the Directorate for Priority Crime Investigation, more commonly known as the Hawks.

Beukman was placed in unelectable position on the ANC's list in the 2019 general election and left parliament on 7 May 2019.

== ICD Executive Director ==
On 5 August 2009, Police Minister Nathi Mthethwa nominated Beukman for the position of executive director of the Independent Complaints Directorate. His nomination was approved by the National Assembly the following day. He replaced former director Karen McKenzie who left the position in 2005. Beukman announced his resignation from the position on the same day as the Marikana massacre in August 2012.
