= De Wet Nel =

South African politician

De Wet Nel MPL

Member of the North West Provincial Legislature
- Incumbent
- Assumed office 22 May 2019

Personal details
- Born: De Wet Nel
- Party: Freedom Front Plus
- Occupation: Member of the Provincial Legislature
- Profession: Politician

De Wet Nel is a South African politician who has served as a Member of North West Provincial Legislature for the Freedom Front Plus since May 2019. In June 2019, he was appointed chairperson of the Standing Committee on Oversight of the North West Provincial Legislature. Nel was previously a councillor of the Rustenburg Local Municipality.

== Political career ==
Nel is a member of the Freedom Front Plus. He served as a councillor of the Rustenburg Local Municipality and as the chairperson of the municipality's municipal public accounts committee until his election to the North West Provincial Legislature in May 2019. He was sworn in as a member on 22 May 2019.

In June 2019, Nel was appointed chairperson of the Standing Committee on Oversight of the North West Provincial Legislature. He later resigned and was replaced by the DA's Jacqueline Theologo.
