= Jim Skosana =

Jim Skosana may refer to:

- Gijimani Skosana (born 1978), South African politician in the National Assembly since 2017 and former mayor of Dr JS Moroka
- James Skosana (1962–2021), South African politician in the National Assembly (2009–2018) and Mpumalanga Provincial Legislature
