= Thulasizwe Thomo =

South African politician (born 1989)

Thulasizwe Thomo MPL

Mpumalanga MEC for Public Works, Roads and Transport
- Incumbent
- Assumed office June 2024
- Premier: Mandla Ndlovu
- Preceded by: Mandla Ndlovu

Member of the Mpumalanga Provincial Legislature
- Incumbent
- Assumed office March 2023

Provincial chairperson for the Mpumalanga ANCYL
- In office August 2022 – August 2023
- Preceded by: Tim Mashele

Personal details
- Born: Thulasizwe Simon Thomo; 12 September 1989 (age 36) Lothair, Msukaligwa Local Municipality, Mpumalanga, South Africa
- Party: African National Congress
- Profession: Politician

Thulasizwe Simon Thomo (born 12 September 1989) is a South African politician who is currently serving as the Member of the Executive Council (MEC) for the Mpumalanga Department of Public Works, Roads and Transport. He has been a Member of the Mpumalanga Provincial Legislature since March 2023 and the provincial chairperson of the African National Congress Youth League (ANCYL) since August 2022 until the disbandment of the structure in August 2023. Thomo is also a regional deputy chairperson for the ruling African National Congress (ANC) in the Gert Sibande region.

Thomo had served as the spokesperson for the ANCYL in the Gert Sibande region until he was elected the Gert Sibande ANCYL chairperson in 2017.

In August 2022, an ANCYL conference elected him as the provincial chairperson of the league in Mpumalanga.

In March 2023, he was sworn in as Member of the Mpumalanga Provincial Legislature and was appointed the Mpumalanga MEC for Public Works, Roads and Transport by premier Mandla Ndlovu in June 2024. He has also served as chairperson responsible for economic development in former premier Refilwe Mtsweni-Tsipane's office between March 2023 and May 2024.
