= 27th South African Parliament =

Parliament of South Africa, 2019–2024

←	26th	28th	→
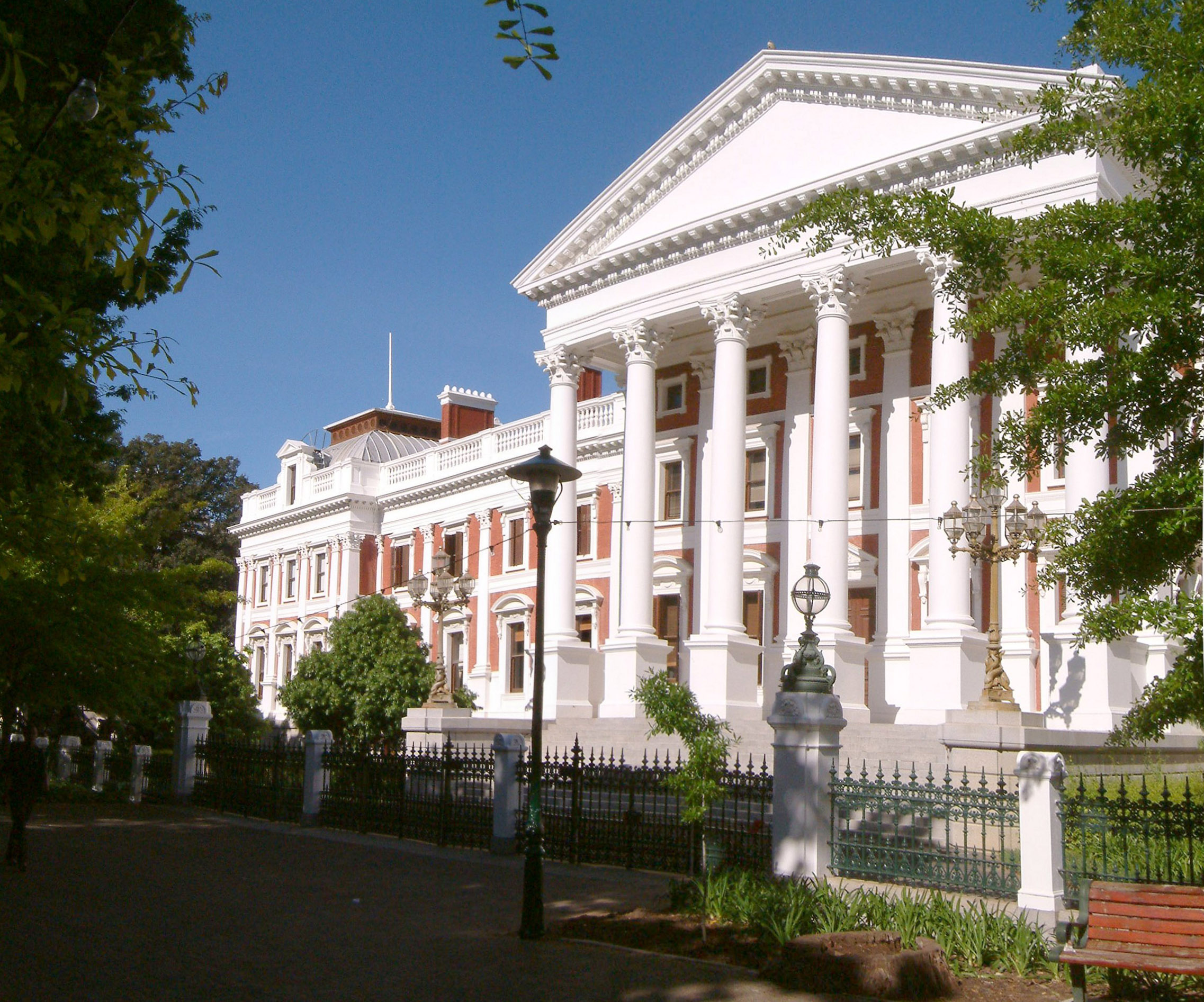
- Houses of Parliament in Cape Town, South Africa

Overview
- Jurisdiction: South Africa
- Meeting place: Cape Town
- Term: 22 May 2019–29 May 2024

National Assembly of South Africa
- Composition of the National Assembly
- Members: 400
- Speaker: Thandi Modise; (22 May 2019 - 5 August 2021): Nosiviwe Mapisa-Nqakula; (5 May 2021 - 3 April 2024): Vacant; (3 April 2024 - 29 May 2024)
- Deputy Speaker: Solomon Lechesa Tsenoli
- Leader of the Opposition: John Steenhuisen

National Council of Provinces
- Composition of the National Council of Provinces
- Members: 90
- Chairperson: Amos Masondo
- Deputy Chairperson: Sylvia Lucas
- Leader of the Opposition: Cathlene Labuschagne

The 27th South African Parliament was the sixth Parliament of South Africa to convene since the introduction of non-racial government in South Africa in 1994. It was elected in the general election of 8 May 2019 and consists of the National Assembly and the National Council of Provinces. The National Assembly contains 400 members, while the National Council of Provinces contains 90 members. It was formally opened by President Ramaphosa's State of the Nation Address in a joint sitting on 20 June 2019.

Members of Parliament were sworn in on 22 May 2019. The 27th Parliament first convened on 22 May 2019 to re-elect Cyril Ramaphosa as President of South Africa.

Fourteen different political parties are represented in this parliament. The majority party in the 26th Parliament, the African National Congress (ANC) retained its majority, although it was reduced to 230 (57.50%) seats, down from the 249 seats out of 400 (62.25%) it had it in the previous Parliament, while the official opposition Democratic Alliance (DA) declined from 89 seats (22.25%) in the 26th Parliament to 84 seats (21%) in the 27th Parliament. Former National Council of Provinces Chairperson Thandi Modise was elected Speaker of the National Assembly, while Solomon Lechesa Tsenoli retained his post as Deputy Speaker. Pemmy Majodina was appointed Chief Whip of the ANC caucus.

The following day, 23 May 2019, the National Council of Provinces reconvened to elect Amos Masondo as the Chairperson, and Sylvia Lucas as the Deputy Chairperson. Seiso Mohai remained Chief Whip of the Majority Party.

== Background ==
New Members of Parliament from fourteen political parties were sworn in by Chief Justice Mogoeng Mogoeng on 22 May 2019

Parliament sits in Cape Town, even though the seat of government is in Pretoria. Chapter 4 of the Constitution of South Africa defines the structure of Parliament, the legislative branch of the national government. Parliament consists of two houses, the National Assembly (the lower house), which is directly elected by voters, and the National Council of Provinces (the upper house), which is elected by each respective provincial legislature.

The National Assembly reconvened on 22 May 2019, while the National Council of Provinces reconvened on the following day, 23 May 2019. According to the Constitution, both Houses of Parliament must be established within fourteen days after the Independent Electoral Commission declared the official election results.

Chief Justice Mogoeng presided over the swearing-in of MPs and the election of the new Speaker of the National Assembly. Former NCOP Chairperson Thandi Modise defeated the Democratic Alliance's candidate Richard Majola by a margin of 250 votes to only 83 votes for Majola. Modise presided over the Deputy Speaker’s election. Incumbent Deputy Speaker Solomon Lechesa Tsenoli of the ANC was re-elected unopposed.

The Chief Justice then presided over the election of the President. Incumbent President Cyril Ramaphosa of the ANC was re-elected unopposed. After the election, Ramaphosa immediately ceased to be a Member of Parliament. Ramaphosa was inaugurated within five days after being elected since the official inauguration took place on 25 May 2019. The inauguration was the first to be held at the Loftus Versfeld Stadium in Pretoria, and not at the Union Buildings. The Union Buildings had been the official venue of the presidential inauguration since the country's first democratically elected president, Nelson Mandela, took the oath of office in 1994.

The first sitting of the National Council of Provinces was held on 23 May 2019. Permanent delegates were sworn in and a Chairperson, Deputy Chairperson, House Chairpersons and Chief Whip were elected.

Former Mayor of Johannesburg Amos Masondo was elected Chairperson of the National Council of Provinces, while former Northern Cape Premier Sylvia Lucas was elected Deputy Chairperson. ANC Chief Whip Seiso Mohai was re-elected.

== Leadership ==
The African National Congress announced its parliamentary leadership on 20 May 2019. The Democratic Alliance announced the following day that the Parliamentary Leader of the Democratic Alliance, Mmusi Maimane, and Opposition Chief Whip in the National Assembly, John Steenhuisen, would both retain their respective posts. Both were elected to full five-year terms on 30 May 2019 as the DA held parliamentary caucus leadership elections. Mmusi Maimane resigned from Parliament on 24 October 2019. John Steenhuisen was appointed as his successor with Natasha Mazzone as the new Chief Whip.

On 22 May 2019, embattled outgoing Minister of Environmental Affairs Nomvula Mokonyane announced her withdrawal from the ANC parliamentary list, citing family reasons. Mokonyane was initially announced by the ANC as the incoming Chairperson of Committees. On 27 June 2019, current parliamentary Chairperson of Committees, Cedric Frolick, was re-elected to his position, despite the official opposition Democratic Alliance nominating one of its MPs, Annelie Lotriet, for the post. Other elected presiding officers include Grace Boroto and Madala Ntombela.

In July 2019, the parliamentary committees elected controversial former Zuma-era cabinet ministers as committee chairpersons. The Democratic Alliance opposed each of the chairpersons in the committee elections. The newly elected committee chairpersons include Faith Muthambi, Sfiso Buthelezi, Tina Joemat-Pettersson and Bongani Bongo. Inkatha Freedom Party MP Mkhuleko Hlengwa was elected Chairperson of the Standing Committee on Public Accounts (SCOPA).

=== National Assembly ===
- President - Cyril Ramaphosa
- Deputy President - David Mabuza
- Speaker - Nosiviwe Mapisa-Nqakula
- Deputy Speaker - Solomon Lechesa Tsenoli
- Chairperson of Committees - Cedric Frolick
- Leader of Government Business - David Mabuza
- Government Chief Whip - Pemmy Majodina
- Deputy Government Chief Whip - Doris Dlakude
- Leader of the Opposition - John Steenhuisen
- Official Opposition Chief Whip - Siviwe Gwarube

=== National Council of the Provinces ===
- Chairperson - Amos Masondo
- Deputy Chairperson - Sylvia Lucas
- Government Chief Whip - Seiso Mohai
- Leader of the Opposition - Cathlene Labuschagne

== Current composition ==
=== National Assembly ===
Party	Seats	%
African National Congress	230	57.5
Democratic Alliance	84	21
Economic Freedom Fighters	44	11
Inkatha Freedom Party	14	3.5
Freedom Front Plus	10	2.5
African Christian Democratic Party	4	1.0
United Democratic Movement	2	0.5
African Transformation Movement	2	0.5
Good	2	0.5
National Freedom Party	2	0.5
Congress of the People	2	0.5
African Independent Congress	2	0.5
Pan Africanist Congress	1	0.25
Al Jama-ah	1	0.25
Total	400	100.00

=== National Council of Provinces ===
Party	Delegate type	Province									Total	
Party	Delegate type	EC	FS	G	KZN	L	M	NW	NC	WC	Total	
African National Congress	Permanent	4	3	3	3	4	4	3	3	2	29	54
African National Congress	Special	3	3	2	3	4	3	3	3	1	25	54
Democratic Alliance	Permanent	1	1	2	1	1	1	1	2	3	13	20
Democratic Alliance	Special	1	1	1					1	3	7	20
Economic Freedom Fighters	Permanent	1	1	1	1	1	1	1	1	1	9	11
Economic Freedom Fighters	Special			1				1			2	11
Freedom Front Plus	Permanent		1					1			2	3
Freedom Front Plus	Special						1				1	3
Inkatha Freedom Party	Permanent				1						1	2
Inkatha Freedom Party	Special				1						1	2
Total		10	10	10	10	10	10	10	10	10	90	
