= Pat Sibande =

South African politician

Member of the National Assembly
- In office 21 May 2014 – 7 May 2019
- In office 2003 – May 2009
- Constituency: Mpumalanga

Delegate to the National Council of Provinces

Assembly Member for Mpumalanga
- In office 7 May 2009 – 21 April 2014

Personal details
- Born: Mtikeni Patrick Sibande; 10 November 1957 (age 68)
- Citizenship: South Africa
- Party: African National Congress

Mtikeni Patrick Sibande (born 10 November 1957) is a South African politician from Mpumalanga. Between 2003 and 2019, he represented the African National Congress (ANC) in Parliament, serving in both houses. He was chairperson of the Select Committee on Public Services during the 25th Parliament.

== Early life and activism ==
Born on 10 November 1957, Sibande was active in the anti-apartheid youth movement.

== Legislative career ==
Sibande joined the National Assembly in 2003 and was elected to a full term in his seat in 2004, representing the ANC in the Mpumalanga constituency. In the next general election in 2009, he was elected to the Mpumalanga caucus of the National Council of Provinces, where he chaired the Select Committee on Public Services.

After a single term in the upper house, he returned to the National Assembly, elected off the ANC's national party list in the 2014 general election; while there, he served as the ANC's whip in the Portfolio Committee on Transport during the 26th Parliament. He left Parliament at the 2019 general election.
