= Annelizé van Wyk =

South African politician (born 1964)

Member of the National Assembly
- In office 5 August 2009 – 6 May 2014
- In office June 1999 – May 2009

Member of the Gauteng Provincial Legislature
- In office 1994–1997

Personal details
- Born: 24 August 1964 (age 62) Pretoria, Transvaal; South Africa
- Party: African National Congress (since April 2003)
- Other political affiliations: United Democratic Movement (1997–2003); National Party (until 1997)
- Education: University of Potchefstroom

Annelizé van Wyk (born 24 August 1964) is a South African politician who served in the National Assembly from 1999 to 2014, excepting a brief hiatus in 2009. She represented the United Democratic Movement (UDM) until April 2003, when she crossed the floor to the African National Congress (ANC). She chaired the Portfolio Committee on Police from 2012 to 2014.

During apartheid, van Wyk was a military intelligence officer in the South African Defence Force and a supporter of the governing National Party (NP). She represented the NP in the post-apartheid Gauteng Provincial Legislature from 1994 until 1997, when she left to become a founding member of the UDM.

== Early life and career ==
Van Wyk was born on 24 August 1964 in Pretoria in the former Transvaal. She is Afrikaans. Her father was a correctional services officer – he personally drove Nelson Mandela from Pretoria to Cape Town for incarceration on Robben Island – and later became a general in the apartheid-era South African Correctional Services.

After completing her undergraduate degree at the University of Potchefstroom, she enlisted in SADF and worked as an officer in the military intelligence division, which at the time was involved in, among other things, enforcing the repression of the anti-apartheid movement. She joined the governing National Party (NP) in 1987 and became a party activist. After leaving SADF, she worked at the Human Sciences Research Council.

Reflecting on her activities during apartheid, van Wyk later said:

For me, the end of apartheid wasn't only about freedom and democracy for the majority of South Africans but it was a personal freedom as well. If you live with the feeling of things not being right and that some people are being treated less like human beings than others, it puts a personal burden on yourself.

== Political career ==
=== Gauteng Legislature: 1994–1997 ===
After South Africa's first post-apartheid elections in 1994, van Wyk represented the NP in the Gauteng Provincial Legislature from 1994 to 1997. She resigned from her seat and from the NP in 1997 in order to become a founding member of the United Democratic Movement (UDM).

=== National Assembly: 1999–2014 ===
==== Floor-crossing ====
In the next general election in 1999, van Wyk was elected to represent the UDM in the National Assembly, the lower house of the national Parliament. On 1 April 2003, during that year's floor-crossing window, she and five other UDM MPs, among them Salam Abram and Cedric Frolick, announced that they would resign from the party and join the governing African National Congress (ANC). Until then it had been rumoured that van Wyk was planning to join the Democratic Alliance (DA), another opposition party; she confirmed that the DA had approached her and the others, but said that they believed the UDM had always been closer to the ANC than to the DA.

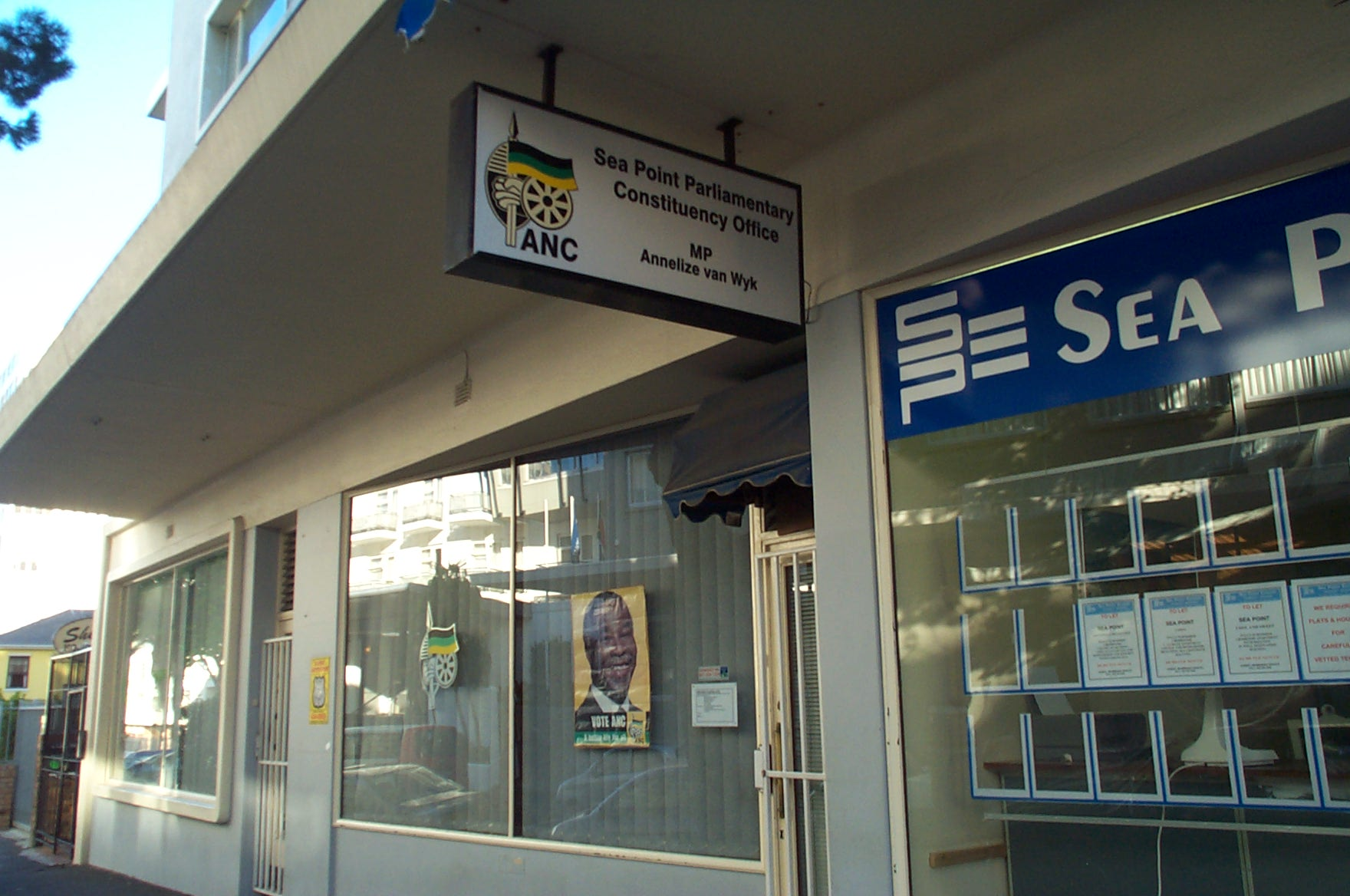
Van Wyk's constituency office in Sea Point, Cape Town

The following year, during a parliamentary debate about the 2004 State of the Nation address, President Thabo Mbeki singled van Wryk out as an exemplar of a former NP supporter who had the "courage, honesty and personal integrity" to "allow us to speak openly about her past and for herself to wrestle with the demons of her past". She was re-elected to her seat in the general election held weeks later, standing under the ANC's banner, but was not initially re-elected to a third term in 2009 general election. Instead, she was sworn in three months after the election, on 5 August 2009, to fill the casual vacancy that arose after Lindiwe Hendricks resigned.

==== Committee memberships ====
During her third term in Parliament, van Wyk sat on the ad hoc committee that processed the highly controversial Secrecy Bill; according to Richard Calland, she was "enthusiastically vigorous" in her defence of the bill. She also sat on the Portfolio Committee on Police, and in 2010 she, with committee chairperson Sindi Chikunga, co-led a parliamentary task team that investigated possible financial mismanagement in state contracts to build police stations. When Chikunga left the committee in mid-2012 to become Deputy Minister of Transport, the ANC appointed van Wyk to serve as acting chairperson. She was formally nominated for election as chairperson in June 2013.

In the 2014 general election, van Wyk was ranked 200th on the ANC's national party list and was not re-elected.
