= Juliet Khumalo =

South African politician

Juliet Khumalo MP

Member of the National Assembly of South Africa
- Incumbent
- Assumed office 14 June 2024
- Constituency: Mpumalanga

Personal details
- Party: African National Congress
- Profession: Politician

Juliet Queen Khumalo is a South African politician who has been a Member of the National Assembly of South Africa for the African National Congress since 2024.

== Political career ==
Khumalo served as the mayor of the Lekwa Local Municipality in Mpumalanga until the African National Congress removed her from the position in October 2009 following weeks of protests related to poor service delivery.

In June 2023, Khumalo was elected as the deputy provincial chairperson of the African National Congress Veterans' League in Mpumalanga.

Khumalo was elected to the National Assembly of South Africa in the 2024 general election, having been ranked 8th on the ANC's regional to national list.
