= Jane Mananiso =

South African politician

Permanent Delegate to the National Council of Provinces from Gauteng
- Incumbent
- Assumed office 15 June 2024

Member of the National Assembly of South Africa
- In office 22 May 2019 – 28 May 2024

Personal details
- Born: Jane Seboletswe Mananiso; 1983 or 1984 (age 42–43)
- Party: African National Congress
- Occupation: Member of Parliament
- Profession: Politician
- Committees: Committee for Section 194 Enquiry; Portfolio Committee on Higher Education, Science and Technology

Jane Seboletswe Mananiso (born 1983 or 1984) is a South African politician who has served as a Permanent Delegate to the National Council of Provinces from Gauteng for the African National Congress since 2024. She previously served in the National Assembly from 2019 until 2024.

== Education ==
Mananiso completed matric. She has a NQF Level 6 qualification in supply chain and public management, a diploma in public management, a NQF Level 5 qualification in monitoring and evaluation, a NQF Level 5 qualification in assessment and coaching, and a certificate in good governance from the Institute for Democratic Alternatives in South Africa (Idasa). In 2018, she graduated from the Program for Young Politicians in Africa (PYPA).

== Political career ==
A member of the African National Congress, she had previously been a member of the African National Congress Youth League, the party's youth wing. She is also a member of the African National Congress Women's League. She had previously served as an ANC branch secretary. She was the deputy chair and the secretary of a women's league branch. Mananiso formerly served on the regional executive committee, the national executive committee, and the national working committee of the ANC's youth league.

== Parliamentary career ==
Mananiso was ranked number 102 on the ANC's national candidate list for the general election on 8 May 2019. She was elected to the National Assembly and was sworn into office on 22 May 2019. At age 35, she was one of many young ANC youth league members who were sworn into the National Assembly after the election.

On 27 June 2019, Mananiso was appointed to sit on the Portfolio Committee on Higher Education, Science and Technology.

In a committee meeting in August 2020, she commended Thidziambi Tshivhase Phendla, who was dismissed from the University of Venda for allegedly meddling in the awarding of a tender to a cleaning company, "for breaking the silence" by reporting former Venda University vice-chancellor Peter Mbati for sexual harassment. Mananiso also said that it was unfortunate that there was a lack of political will to hold Mbati accountable.

During a question and answer session in the National Assembly on 5 March 2021, she made the claim that black university heads were not carrying their weight, compared with those of other race groups at institutions of higher learning. Her claim was quickly denounced by the Minister of Higher Education, Science and Technology, Dr. Blade Nzimande, as well as the vice-chancellor of the University of Fort Hare, Professor Sakhela Buhlungu.

Mananiso became a voting member of the Committee for Section 194 Enquiry on 21 June 2021 as the committee's composition was changed to give smaller parties voting rights. The committee was established to determine Public Protector Busisiwe Mkhwebane's fitness to hold office.

Following the 2024 general election, Mananiso was sworn into the National Council of Provinces as a Permanent Delegate from Gauteng.
