= Portfolio Committee on Health =

Committee on Health in the National Assembly of South Africa

- Formation: 1994
- Purpose: Portfolio Committee of the National Assembly responsible for oversight of the Department of Health (DOH) and statutory entities.
- Chairperson: Kenneth Jacobs
- Parent organisation: National Assembly of South Africa
- Website: www.parliament.gov.za/committee-details/147

The Portfolio Committee on Health is a National Assembly of South Africa committee established to oversee the work of the Department of Health (DOH) as well as the following related entities: the Allied Health Professions Council, the Compensation Commissioner for Occupational Diseases, the Council for Medical Schemes (CMS), the South Africa Dental Technicians Council, the Health Professions Council of South Africa (HPCSA), the Interim Traditional Health Practitioners Council, the National Health Laboratory Service (NHLS), the Office of Health Standards Compliance, the South African Medical Research Council (SAMRC), the South African Health Products Regulatory Authority, the South African Nursing Council, and the South African Pharmacy Council.

As of 2021, Kenneth Jacobs of the African National Congress serves as chairperson of the committee. Notable former chairpersons include Sibongiseni Dhlomo (2019–2021) Mary-Ann Dunjwa (2014–2019) and Bevan Goqwana (2009–2014).

== Membership ==
Following the 2019 South African general election held on 8 May, the Rules Committee met on 5 June and resolved that portfolio committees will consist of 11 members for the sixth parliament (2019–2024): 6 from the African National Congress, 2 from the Democratic Alliance, 1 from the Economic Freedom Fighters and two from other parties. Members of the National Assembly were formally appointed to serve on the respective portfolio committees on 27 June 2019. The Portfolio Committee on Health met on 2 July 2019 to elect a new chairperson and Sibongiseni Dhlomo of the African National Congress was elected.

As of 2021, the membership of the committee was as follows:

Party	Member
ANC	Kenneth Jacobs (Chairperson)
EFF	Naledi Chirwa
ANC	Annah Gela
DA	Siviwe Gwarube
ANC	Xiaomei Havard
IFP	Magdalena Hlengwa
ANC	Tshilidzi Munyai
ANC	Elvis Siwela
ANC	Mxolisi Sokatsha
VF+	Philip van Staden
DA	Lindy Wilson

The following MPs serve as alternate members:

- Ganief Hendricks (Al Jama-ah)
- Haseenabanu Ismail (Democratic Alliance)
- Munzoor Shaik Emam (National Freedom Party)
- Marie Sukers (African Christian Democratic Party)
- Grace Tseke (African National Congress)

== See also ==
- Committees of the Parliament of South Africa
