= Angel Khanyile =

South African politician

Angel Khanyile MP

Shadow Minister of Home Affairs
- In office 20 February 2020 – 14 June 2024
- Deputy: Adrian Roos
- Leader: John Steenhuisen
- Preceded by: Joe McGluwa
- Succeeded by: Office vacant

Shadow Deputy Minister of Home Affairs
- In office 5 June 2019 – 20 February 2020
- Leader: John Steenhuisen; Mmusi Maimane
- Preceded by: Archie Figlan
- Succeeded by: Adrian Roos

Member of the National Assembly of South Africa
- Incumbent
- Assumed office 11 December 2017

Personal details
- Born: 12 August 1982 (age 43)
- Party: Democratic Alliance (2014–present)
- Children: 3
- Occupation: Member of Parliament
- Profession: Politician

Thembisile Angel Khanyile (born 12 August 1982) is a South African politician who is a member of the National Assembly of South Africa representing the Democratic Alliance. Within the DA's Shadow Cabinet, she served as the Shadow Minister and Shadow Deputy Minister of Home Affairs.

== Political career ==
Khanyile joined the Democratic Alliance in 2014 as an ordinary member. She served as a councillor in the Lekwa Local Municipality before she was appointed to parliament.

== Parliamentary career ==
On 11 December 2017, Khanyile entered the National Assembly as a DA representative from Mpumalanga. She became an alternate member of the Portfolio Committee on Social Development on 9 March 2018. Khanyile delivered her maiden speech on 9 May 2018.

Prior to the 2019 general election, Khanyile was placed 52nd on the DA's national list and 3rd on the party's regional Mpumalanga list. She won a full term in parliament at the election on 8 May 2019. Soon after, on 5 June, she was appointed as Shadow Deputy Minister of Home Affairs by Mmusi Maimane, the DA leader.

On 2 July 2019, Joe McGluwa, the then-Shadow Minister of Home Affairs, nominated Khanyile for chairperson of the Portfolio Committee on Home Affairs. She lost to the ANC's candidate, Bongani Bongo.

Maimane resigned as DA leader in October 2019 and John Steenhuisen was voted in as interim leader in November. He temporarily retained Maimane's shadow cabinet, keeping Khanyile in her position.

On 20 February 2020, she accused ANC deputy whip Dorries Dlakude of instigating gender-based violence. Dlakude then said that Khanyile must bring a substantive motion to back up her claim. Khanyile was promoted to Shadow Minister of Home Affairs on that same day. On 5 December 2020, Khanyile was reappointed as Shadow Minister of Home Affairs by John Steenhuisen in his first shadow cabinet reshuffle since he was elected leader for a full term at the 2020 Democratic Alliance Federal Congress.

Khanyile was re-elected to the National Assembly in the 2024 general election.

== Personal life ==
Khanyile lives in Standerton. She has three children.
