= 26th South African Parliament =

Parliament of South Africa, 2014–2019

←	25th	27th	→

Overview
- Jurisdiction: South Africa
- Meeting place: Cape Town
- Term: 21 May 2014 – 21 May 2019

National Assembly of South Africa
- Composition of the National Assembly
- Members: 400
- Speaker of the National Assembly of South Africa: Baleka Mbete
- Leader of the Opposition: Mmusi Maimane
- Presiding Officers: Mmatlala Boroto, Cedric Frolick, Thoko Didiza

National Council of Provinces
- Members: 90
- Chairperson: Thandi Modise
- Deputy Chairperson: Raseriti Tau
- Leader of the Opposition: Cathlene Labuschagne

The 26th South African Parliament was the fifth Parliament of South Africa to convene since the introduction of non-racial government in South Africa in 1994. It was elected in the general election of 7 May 2014 and consists of the National Assembly and the National Council of Provinces. The National Assembly contains 400 members, while the National Council of Provinces contains 90 members. Members of Parliament were sworn in on 21 May 2014. The 26th parliament first convened on 21 May 2014 to elect Jacob Zuma as the fifth democratically elected President of South Africa. It was formally opened by president Zuma's State of the Nation Address in a joint sitting on 17 June 2014.

13 Different political parties are represented in this parliament. The majority party in the 25th parliament, the African National Congress (ANC) retained its majority, although it was reduced to 249 (62%) seats, down from 264 seats out of 400 (66%), while the Democratic Alliance (DA) increased its lead of the opposition, taking 89 (22.23%) seats, up from 67 seats (16.75%) in the National Assembly of the 25th parliament. The Speaker of the National Assembly, Baleka Mbete and Chairperson of the National Council of Provinces, Thandi Modise, both of the ANC, were elected on 21 May 2014 by members of parliament. The presiding officers of parliament, Mmatlala Boroto, Cedric Frolick and Thoko Didiza were elected on 18 June 2014.

Mmusi Maimane was elected parliamentary Leader of the Opposition in a DA election in May 2014.

== Parties represented ==
=== National Assembly ===
Party	Seats
African National Congress	249
Democratic Alliance (South Africa)	89
Economic Freedom Fighters	25
Inkatha Freedom Party	10
National Freedom Party	6
United Democratic Movement	4
Freedom Front Plus	4
Congress of the People	3
African Christian Democratic Party	3
African Independent Congress	3
Agang South Africa	2
Pan Africanist Congress	1
African People's Convention	1
Total	400

=== National Council of Provinces ===
Party	Delegate type	Province									Total	
Party	Delegate type	EC	FS	G	KZN	L	M	NW	NC	WC	Total	
African National Congress	Permanent	4	4	3	4	4	4	4	4	2	33	60
African National Congress	Special	3	3	2	3	4	4	3	3	2	27	60
Democratic Alliance	Permanent	1	1	2	1	1	1	1	1	4	13	20
Democratic Alliance	Special	1	1	2					1	2	7	20
Economic Freedom Fighters	Permanent		1	1		1	1	1	1		6	7
Economic Freedom Fighters	Special							1			1	7
Inkatha Freedom Party	Permanent				1						1	
National Freedom Party	Special				1						1	
United Democratic Movement	Permanent	1									1	
Total		10	10	10	10	10	10	10	10	10	90	

== Incidents ==
On 13 November 2014, MPs were involved in a physical altercation with police when EFF MP Ngwanamakwetle Mashabela refused to leave the podium after being instructed to when she called President Jacob Zuma a thief. Several DA and EFF MPs were shoved and pushed when trying to intervene with police in order to support Mashabela. DA chief whip John Steenhuisen said of the incident: “Four of my [DA] members, two of them women, have been assaulted by police. They are Terri Stander, Gordon Mackay, Denise Robinson and Dean Macpherson.”

On 12 February 2015, at a joint-sitting for this parliament's 2nd State of the Nation Address, violence broke out after the parliamentary security force was called into the chamber by the speaker of parliament to remove the EFF, who were questioning president Jacob Zuma on his Nkandla property during his address. Following the ejection of the EFF, the DA requested clarification on whether members of the South African Police Service entered the parliamentary chamber, which they claimed was a violation of the constitution. After the speaker of parliament told the DA that it was unclear who were and were not members of the police, all the DA MPs walked out of the sitting.

== See also ==
- List of National Assembly members of the 26th Parliament of South Africa
- List of National Council of Provinces members of the 26th Parliament of South Africa
