= Marie Sukers =

South African politician (born 1972)

Member of the National Assembly of South Africa
- In office 22 May 2019 – 28 May 2024

Personal details
- Born: 18 June 1972 (age 54)
- Party: African Christian Democratic Party
- Education: Wits Business School
- Occupation: Member of Parliament
- Profession: Politician

Marie Elizabeth Sukers (born 18 June 1972) is a South African politician from the Western Cape who served as a Member of the National Assembly of South Africa for the African Christian Democratic Party from May 2019 until May 2024.

== Early life and education ==
In 1991, she achieved a Ministerial Development Diploma from the Rhema Bible Training Centre. She fulfilled a management program at Wits Business School in 2005. Sukers obtained a bachelor's degree in theology from the International School of Ministry (ISOM) in 2018.

== Parliamentary career ==
Sukers was nominated to the National Assembly of South Africa following the general election that was held on 8 May 2019 because she was placed second on the ACDP's regional list. She was sworn in as a Member of Parliament on 22 May 2019. On 27 June, she received her committee assignments.

During a debate on gender-based violence in September 2019, Sukers called for the House to forget about politics, and to show leadership in addressing the scourge of violence. She called for a national day of prayer against Gender Based Violence.

Sukers was not high enough on the ACDP list for her to be returned to parliament following the 2024 general election.

=== Committees ===
- Portfolio Committee on Basic Education
- Portfolio Committee on Health (Alternate)
- Portfolio Committee on Social Development
- Committee for Section 194 Enquiry
