= Julian Mokoena =

South African politician

Member of the National Assembly of South Africa
- Incumbent
- Assumed office 2024
- Constituency: Mpumalanga

Personal details
- Party: African National Congress

Julian Leseletsi Mokoena is a South African politician and a Member of Parliament (MP) for the African National Congress (ANC). She was elected to the National Assembly of South Africa in the 2024 South African general election.

== See also ==
- List of National Assembly members of the 28th Parliament of South Africa
