= Chris Gololo =

South African politician

Member of the National Assembly
- In office 23 April 2004 – 6 May 2014

Personal details
- Citizenship: South Africa
- Party: African National Congress

Christopher Lancaster Gololo is a South African politician who represented the African National Congress (ANC) in the National Assembly from 2004 to 2014. He joined the ANC in exile in 1977 during apartheid.

== Career ==
Gololo joined the ANC in Tanzania in 1977 in the aftermath of the 1976 Soweto uprising. In exile with the ANC, he lived in Tanzania, Cuba, Czechoslovakia, and India. He returned to South Africa in 1993, during South Africa's democratic transition, and worked as an administrator for the ANC's Mpumalanga branch from 1994 to 2004. In the 2004 general election, he was elected to an ANC seat in the National Assembly, representing the Mpumalanga constituency; he was elected to a second term in 2009. The ANC did not nominate him for re-election in 2014.
