= Sipho Mahlangu =

South African politician

Sipho Mahlangu MP

Member of the National Assembly of South Africa
- Incumbent
- Assumed office 2024
- Constituency: Mpumalanga

Personal details
- Citizenship: South Africa
- Party: African National Congress

Sipho Mahlangu is a South African politician who has been a Member of Parliament (MP) for the African National Congress since 2024.
