= Sipho Siboza =

South African politician

Member of the National Assembly
- In office 23 April 2004 – May 2009
- Constituency: Mpumalanga

Personal details
- Born: 11 April 1964 (age 62)
- Citizenship: South Africa
- Party: African National Congress

Sipho Siboza (born 11 April 1964) is a South African politician who represented the Mpumalanga constituency in the National Assembly from 2004 to 2009. A member of the African National Congress, he was elected in the 2004 general election, ranked fifth on the party's regional list for Mpumalanga. He did not stand for re-election in 2009.
