= Tim Mashele =

South African politician

Member of the National Assembly of South Africa
- In office 22 May 2019 – 19 July 2024
- Constituency: Mpumalanga

Personal details
- Born: Timothy Victor Mashele
- Party: African National Congress
- Education: University of South Africa (BA)

Timothy Victor Mashele is a South African politician. He was a member of the National Assembly of South Africa. Mashele is a member of the African National Congress (ANC).

== Education ==
Mashele graduated from the University of South Africa with a Bachelor of Arts degree in Government Administration and Development in 2021. He is currently doing his masters in developmental studies.

== Political career ==
In 2012, he was elected as the provincial treasure of the South African Students Congress (SASCO) in Mpumalanga. He served as the regional secretary of the African National Congress Youth League from 2013 until his election as the provincial chairperson in 2016, a position he currently holds. In 2015, he became a regional executive committee (REC) member of the African National Congress.

In 2014, he was appointed to be the Parliamentary and Media Liaison within the Mpumalanga department of Health, and in 2016, he was appointed as the senior manager in the office of MEC health. In 2018, he was given the same position at the Mpumalanga Department of Roads and Public Works. 2024 appointed executive manager office of the Speaker Mpumalanga Provincial Legislature.

During the 74th celebration of the ANC youth league in Middelburg, Mashele called on members to not nominate older people to parliament or legislatures because they sleep during debates.

Mashele was placed second on the ANC's list of Mpumalanga candidates for the National Assembly for the 2019 General Elections. He was elected to the National Assembly at the election. He is a member of the Joint Constitutional Review Committee, the Portfolio Committee on Mineral Resources and Energy, the Portfolio Committee on Police and the Portfolio Committee on Public Works and Infrastructure.

In October 2020, Mashele criticised Public Works and Infrastructure Minister Patricia de Lille for her role in the Beitbridge border fence controversy, saying: "The minister was central here. She issued an illegal directive. These wrongdoings were not an accident. We have received the reports from National Treasury."

On the 2nd of April 2022 Tim Mashele was elected as a ANC Provincial Executive Committee member.

Mashele was re-elected to the National Assembly in the 2024 general election but resigned less than two months later.

== Personal life ==
His interests include watching soccer and reading.
