= Mikateko Mahlaule =

South African politician

Mikateko Mahlaule MP

Member of the National Assembly of South Africa
- Incumbent
- Assumed office 22 May 2019

Personal details
- Born: Mikateko Golden Mahlaule
- Party: African National Congress
- Occupation: Member of Parliament
- Profession: Politician

Mikateko Golden Mahlaule is a South African politician from Limpopo who serves as a Member of Parliament (MP) for the African National Congress.

== Parliamentary career ==
Mahlaule is a member of the African National Congress. Prior to the 8 May 2019 general election, Mahlaule was placed 107th on the party's national list. After the election, he was selected to go to Parliament. He was sworn in as a Member of the National Assembly of South Africa on 22 May 2019.

Mahlaule became a member of the Portfolio Committee on Mineral Resources and Energy on 27 June 2019.

On 21 June 2021, Mahlaule became a member of the Committee for Section 194 Enquiry which will determine if Advocate Busisiwe Mkhwebane should be removed as Public Protector.
