= Jacqueline Theologo =

South African politician

Jacqueline Theologo MPL

Member of the North West Provincial Legislature
- Incumbent
- Assumed office 21 May 2014

Personal details
- Born: Jacqueline Rachelle Watson
- Party: Democratic Alliance
- Relations: Watty Watson (father)
- Occupation: Member of the Provincial Legislature
- Profession: Politician

Jacqueline Rachelle Theologo (née Watson) is a South African politician who has served as a Member of the North West Provincial Legislature for the Democratic Alliance since May 2014. Theologo is the daughter of Watty Watson.

== Political career ==
Theologo is a member of the Democratic Alliance. She served as a councillor of the Ngaka Modiri Molema District Municipality until her election to the North West Provincial Legislature in the general election on 8 May 2014. She was sworn in as an MPL on 21 May 2014.

Theologo was re-elected to a second term in May 2019. She took office on 22 May 2019.

In March 2021, Theologo was elected Chairperson of the Standing Committee on the Oversight of the North West Provincial Legislature.

== Personal life ==
Theologo is the daughter of the deceased Watty Watson, who was a senior member of the Democratic Alliance until his death.
