= Haseenabanu Ismail =

South African politician

Haseenabanu Ismail MP

Member of the National Assembly of South Africa
- Incumbent
- Assumed office 22 May 2019

Personal details
- Born: 9 November 1969 (age 56)
- Party: Democratic Alliance
- Occupation: Politician

Haseenabanu Ismail (born 9 November 1969) is a South African politician of the Democratic Alliance who is serving as a member of the South African National Assembly since May 2019. Ismail was previously the councillor for ward 29 in the Ekurhuleni Metropolitan Municipality.

== Political career ==
She is a member of the Democratic Alliance. In 2013, she was appointed to the Ekurhuleni city council as a proportional representation (PR) councillor. Prior to the 2016 municipal elections, Ismail was chosen as the DA's candidate for ward 29 in Ekurhuleni, an area that includes Actonville. She won the election with 43.9% of the vote.

Before the 2019 general election, Ismail was ranked 13th on the DA's national list. At the election, she won a seat in the National Assembly. She was a member of the Portfolio Committee on Health in parliament.

Ismail was appointed Shadow Deputy Minister of Tourism on 21 April 2023.

Ismail was re-elected to Parliament in the 2024 general election.
