= Kenneth Jacobs (politician) =

South African politician and doctor

Kenneth Jacobs MP

Chairperson of the Portfolio Committee on Health
- Incumbent
- Assumed office 31 August 2021
- Preceded by: Sibongiseni Dhlomo

Member of the National Assembly of South Africa
- Incumbent
- Assumed office 22 May 2019

Personal details
- Born: Kenneth Leonard Jacobs; 7 May 1959 (age 67)
- Party: African National Congress
- Education: University of the Western Cape (BSc); University of Cape Town (BSc (Med) Hons); University of Stellenbosch (MBChB, MMed (Fam Med)); University of Pretoria (MSc)
- Occupation: Member of Parliament
- Profession: Politician doctor
- Committees: Portfolio Committee on Health

Kenneth Leonard Jacobs (born 7 May 1959) is a South African politician and doctor, and the chairperson of the Portfolio Committee on Health in the National Assembly of South Africa since 2021. He has been a Member of Parliament since 2019. Jacobs is a member of the African National Congress.

== Background ==
Jacobs was born on 7 May 1959. He holds a Bachelor of Science (BSc) degree from the University of the Western Cape, a Bachelor of Medical Sciences degree from the University of Cape Town, a Bachelor of Medicine and Bachelor of Surgery (MBChB) degree and a Master of Medicine (MMed) degree in Family Medicine from the University of Stellenbosch as well as a Master of Science (MSc) degree in Sports Medicine from the University of Pretoria.

Jacobs is a former member of the provincial executive committee (PEC) of the African National Congress in the Western Cape.

== Parliamentary career ==
In 2019 Jacobs stood for election to the South African National Assembly as 5th on the ANC's Western Cape list of parliamentary candidates. At the election, he won a seat in parliament. Upon election, he became a member of the Portfolio Committee on Health.

In August 2021, Jacobs was elected Chairperson of the Portfolio Committee on Health. Jacobs replaced Sibongiseni Dhlomo, who was appointed Deputy Minister of Health.
