= Derick Mnguni =

South African politician and educator

Member of the National Assembly of South Africa
- In office 21 May 2014 – 7 May 2019
- Constituency: Mpumalanga

Personal details
- Born: Derick Mnguni
- Party: African National Congress
- Occupation: Politician

Derick Mnguni is a South African politician and former educator who served as a Member of Parliament for the African National Congress from 2014 until 2019.

== Background ==
Mnguni is a former principal of Ihlobane Combined School in the Mpuluzi circuit outside Mayflower in Mpumalanga. By 2014, he was based in the now-disbanded Umjindi Local Municipality.

== Parliamentary career ==
Mnguni stood as an ANC parliamentary candidate from Mpumalanga in the 2014 general election and was subsequently elected to the National Assembly and sworn in on 21 May 2014. On 20 June 2014, he was named to the Portfolio Committee on Water and Sanitation and the Portfolio Committee on Basic Education.

During a meeting of the Portfolio Committee on Water and Sanitation in September 2015, Mnguni expressed concerned at the amount of dams owned and not owned by the Department of Water and Sanitation after the department revealed that it owned only 320 out of the more than 5,000 registered dams in the country. He later left the Portfolio Committee on Water and Sanitation in May 2016, but remained a member of the Portfolio Committee on Basic Education. In October of the same year, he became a member of the Portfolio Committee on Water and Sanitation again.

As committee members of the Portfolio Committee on Basic Education discussed rising incidents of violence at schools during a meeting in August 2017, Mnguni made reference to incidents of violence at schools in Bushbuckridge where a shooting happened on a school's premises and said: "Violence in schools is escalating." Mnguni was discharged from the Portfolio Committee on Basic Education on 12 September 2018; he remained a member of the Portfolio Committee on Water and Sanitation until the dissolution of the parliamentary term. He did not stand for re-election at the 2019 general election.
