= Garth Mngomezulu =

South African politician (born 1952)

Member of the National Assembly
- In office 9 May 1994 – 1 June 2006
- Constituency: Mpumalanga

Personal details
- Born: Garth Piet Mngomezulu; 20 February 1952 (age 74)
- Citizenship: South Africa
- Party: African National Congress

Garth Piet Mngomezulu (born 20 February 1952) is a South African politician who represented the African National Congress (ANC) in the National Assembly from 1994 to 2006, representing the Mpumalanga constituency. In August 2006, shortly after he vacated his seat, he was convicted of having defrauded Parliament in the Travelgate scandal.

== Legislative career ==
Mngomezulu was elected to the National Assembly in the 1994 general election and subsequently gained re-election in 1999 and 2004. He represented the Mpumalanga constituency and served as a party whip for the ANC during his third term. He resigned from Parliament in the middle of his third term, vacating his seat on 1 June 2006.

By the time of his resignation, Mngomezulu was facing criminal charges for his involvement in the Travelgate scandal, which concerned the abuse of parliamentary air-travel vouchers by MPs. In October 2006, he signed a plea deal with the Scorpions, in terms of which he pled guilty to fraud in the Cape High Court. The fraud concerned an amount of R235,000 in service benefits and he was sentenced to pay a fine of R100,000 or serve five years' imprisonment; he was also sentenced to a mandatory five years' imprisonment, suspended conditionally.
