= Reneiloe Mashabela =

South African politician

Reneiloe Mashabela MP
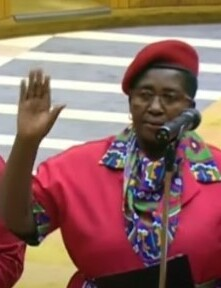

Member of the National Assembly of South Africa
- Incumbent
- Assumed office 21 May 2014

Personal details
- Party: Economic Freedom Fighters
- Occupation: Member of Parliament
- Profession: Politician

Ngwanamakwetle Reneiloe Mashabela is a South African politician from the Economic Freedom Fighters party. She has been a Member of Parliament (MP) in the National Assembly of South Africa since May 2014. Mashabela is a member of the central command team of the EFF.

== Career ==
Mashabela joined the Economic Freedom Fighters in 2013. She was elected to the National Assembly of South Africa in the general election held on 7 May 2014. Mashabela was sworn in as a Member of Parliament on 21 May 2014.

In November 2014, house chairperson Cedric Frolick ordered sergeant-at-arms Regina Mohlomi to remove Mashabela from the house after she repeatedly called president Jacob Zuma a "thief" and refused to withdraw. Riot police came in to remove her from the chamber. Mashabela said that she was "traumatised" from the experience.

At the EFF's conference in December 2014, she was elected to the central command team as an additional member.

Mashabela was re-elected as an MP in May 2019. She was re-elected to the central command team of the EFF in December 2019. She was re-elected for another term in the National Assembly in the 2024 general election.
