= Denis Joseph =

South African politician (born 1958)

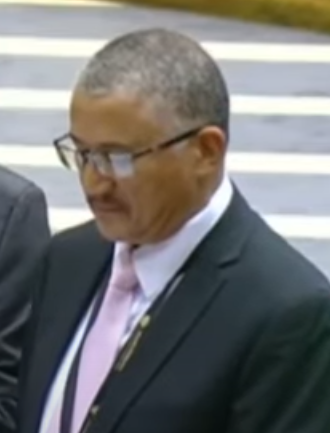

Member of the National Assembly of South Africa
- In office 22 May 2019 – 28 May 2024

Member of the Western Cape Provincial Parliament
- In office 21 May 2014 – 7 May 2019

Permanent delegate to the National Council of Provinces
- In office 20 October 2011 – 21 April 2014

Personal details
- Born: Denis Joseph; 2 September 1958 (age 67)
- Party: Democratic Alliance
- Occupation: Member of Parliament
- Profession: Politician

Denis Joseph (born 2 September 1958) is a South African politician from the Western Cape. A member of the Democratic Alliance (DA), he was elected as a permanent delegate to the National Council of Provinces in 2011. He served in the NCOP until his election to the Western Cape Provincial Parliament in 2014. After the 2019 election, Joseph returned to Parliament to serve as an MP in the National Assembly until 2024.

== Political career ==
Joseph served as a Democratic Alliance councillor in the City of Cape Town until he was elected as a permanent delegate to the National Council of Provinces in October 2011. In the NCOP, he was a member of the Select Committee on Appropriations, the Select Committee on Finance, and the Joint Standing Committee on Defence.

For the 2014 provincial election, Joseph was placed 24th on the DA's list for the Western Cape Provincial Parliament. He won a seat in the provincial parliament at the election and was appointed deputy chief whip of the DA caucus after his swearing-in. From 2014 to 2019, Joseph served as chairperson of the Budget Committee and the Standing Committee on Finance. He was also a member of the Public Accounts and Rules committees.

Joseph stood as a DA parliamentary candidate on the national list in the 2019 national elections, and was subsequently elected to the National Assembly and sworn in on 22 May 2019.

On 5 June 2019, DA leader Mmusi Maimane announced that Joseph and Ashor Sarupen would represent the DA on the Standing Committee on Appropriations. After John Steenhuisen was elected party leader, he announced that Joseph would now serve on the Portfolio Committee on Sports, Arts and Culture.

Joseph was not reelected to Parliament at the 2024 elections.
