= Sahlulele Luzipo =

South African politician

Member of the National Assembly of South Africa
- In office 21 May 2014 – 28 May 2024

Personal details
- Born: Sahlulele Luzipo
- Party: African National Congress; South African Communist Party

Sahlulele Luzipo is a South African politician who was elected to the National Assembly of South Africa in the 2014 general election as a member of the African National Congress. He was then elected to chair the Portfolio Committee on Mineral Resources. Following his re-election in 2019, Luzipo was elected chair of the newly established Portfolio Committee on Mineral Resources and Energy. He was not reelected to Parliament in 2024.
