= 25th South African Parliament =

Parliament of South Africa, 2009–2014

←	24th	26th	→

Overview
- Jurisdiction: South Africa
- Meeting place: Cape Town
- Term: 6 May 2009 – 21 May 2014

National Assembly of South Africa
- Composition of the National Assembly
- Members: 400
- Speaker of the National Assembly of South Africa: Max Sisulu
- Leader of the Opposition: Athol Trollip (until 27 October 2011); Lindiwe Mazibuko (from 27 October 2011)

National Council of Provinces
- Composition of the National Council of Provinces
- Members: 90
- Chairperson: M.J. Mahlangu
- Deputy Chairperson: Thandi Memela
- Leader of the Opposition: Watty Watson

The 25th South African Parliament was the fourth Parliament of South Africa to convene since the introduction of non-racial government in South Africa in 1994. It was elected in the general election of 22 April 2009, and first met on 6 May of that year to elect Jacob Zuma as the fourth President of South Africa. It was formally opened by the newly elected President's State of the Nation address in a joint sitting on 3 June 2009. The ANC retained its majority, although it was reduced to 264 seats out of 400 (66%) in the National Assembly, while the Democratic Alliance increased its lead of the opposition, taking 67 seats (16.75%). The Speaker of the National Assembly was Max Sisulu of the ANC and the Chairperson of the National Council of Provinces was M. J. Mahlangu, also of the ANC.

== Parties represented ==
=== National Assembly ===
Party	Seats
African National Congress	264
Democratic Alliance	67
Congress of the People	30
Inkatha Freedom Party	18
Independent Democrats	4
United Democratic Movement	4
Freedom Front Plus	4
African Christian Democratic Party	3
United Christian Democratic Party	2
Pan Africanist Congress	1
Minority Front	1
Azanian People's Organisation	1
African People's Convention	1
Total	400

=== National Council of Provinces ===
Party	Delegate type	Province									Total	
Party	Delegate type	EC	FS	G	KZN	L	M	NW	NC	WC	Total	
African National Congress	Permanent	4	4	4	4	5	5	4	3	2	35	62
African National Congress	Special	3	3	3	3	4	4	3	3	1	27	62
Democratic Alliance	Permanent	1	1	1	1		1	1	1	3	10	13
Democratic Alliance	Special			1						2	3	13
Congress of the People	Permanent	1	1	1		1		1	1	1	7	8
Congress of the People	Special								1		1	8
Independent Democrats	Permanent								1		1	2
Independent Democrats	Special									1	1	2
Inkatha Freedom Party	Permanent				1						1	2
Inkatha Freedom Party	Special				1						1	2
Freedom Front Plus	Special		1								1	
United Christian Democratic Party	Special							1			1	
United Democratic Movement	Special	1									1	
Total		10	10	10	10	10	10	10	10	10	90	

== See also ==
- List of National Assembly members of the 25th Parliament of South Africa
- List of National Council of Provinces members of the 25th Parliament of South Africa
