= Zandile Majozi =

South African politician

Zandile Majozi MP
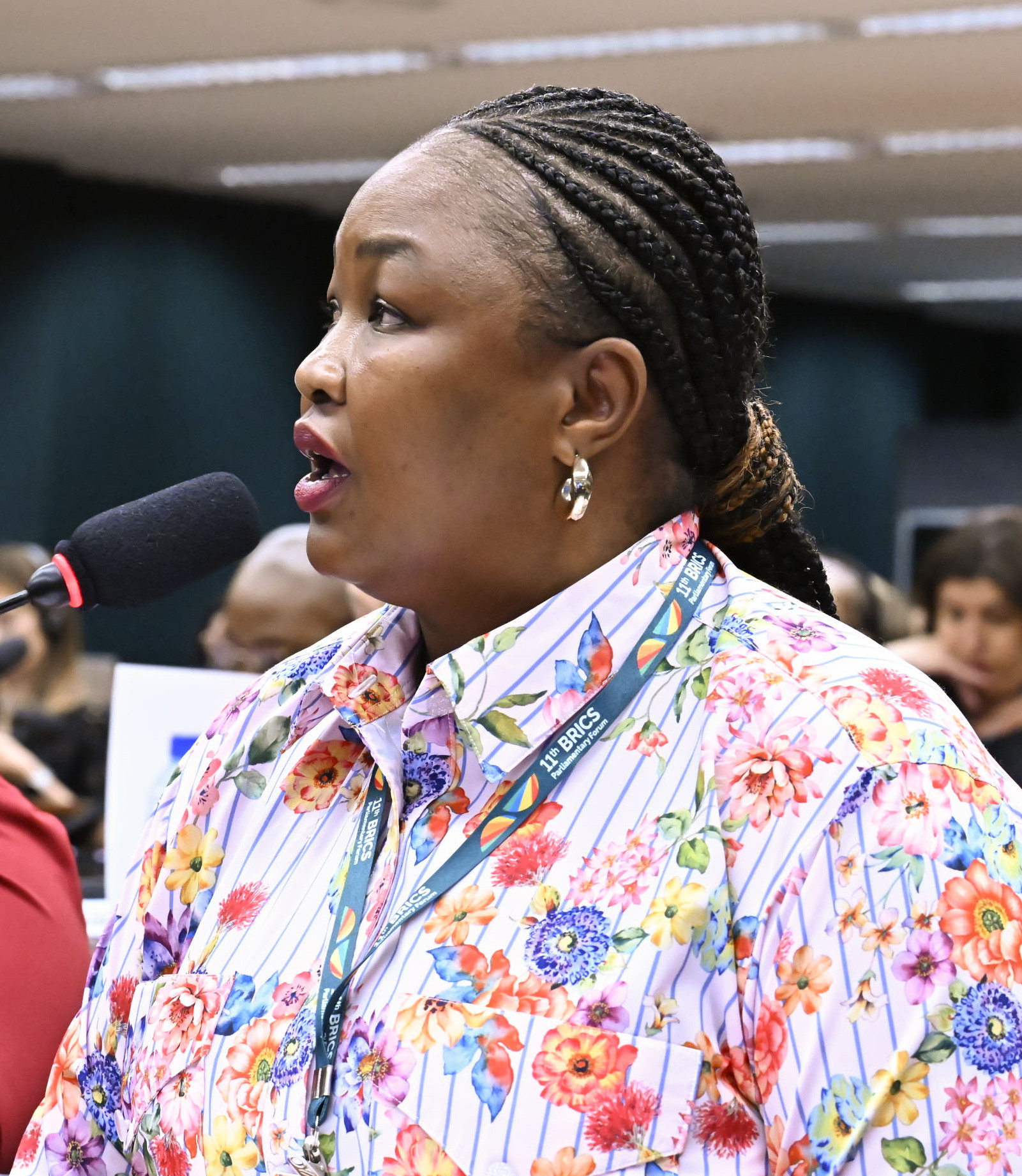
- Majozi in 2025

Member of the National Assembly of South Africa
- Incumbent
- Assumed office 22 May 2019

Personal details
- Party: Inkatha Freedom Party
- Profession: Politician

Zandile Majozi is a South African politician who became an MP in the South African parliament at the 2019 general election as a representative of the Inkatha Freedom Party.

== Parliamentary career ==
In 2019, Majozi stood for election to the South African National Assembly as 5th on the IFP's regional to national candidate list. At the election, she won a seat in the National Assembly.

Upon election, Majozi was assigned to the following committees: the Committee on Multi-Party Women's Caucus, the Portfolio Committee on Communications, and the Portfolio Committee on Police.

On 21 June 2021, Majozi became a member of the Committee for Section 194 Enquiry, which was established to determine Public Protector Busisiwe Mkhwebane's fitness to hold office.

During the 2024 general election, Majozi was re-elected to Parliament on the IFP national list.
