= Beverley Abrahams =

South African politician

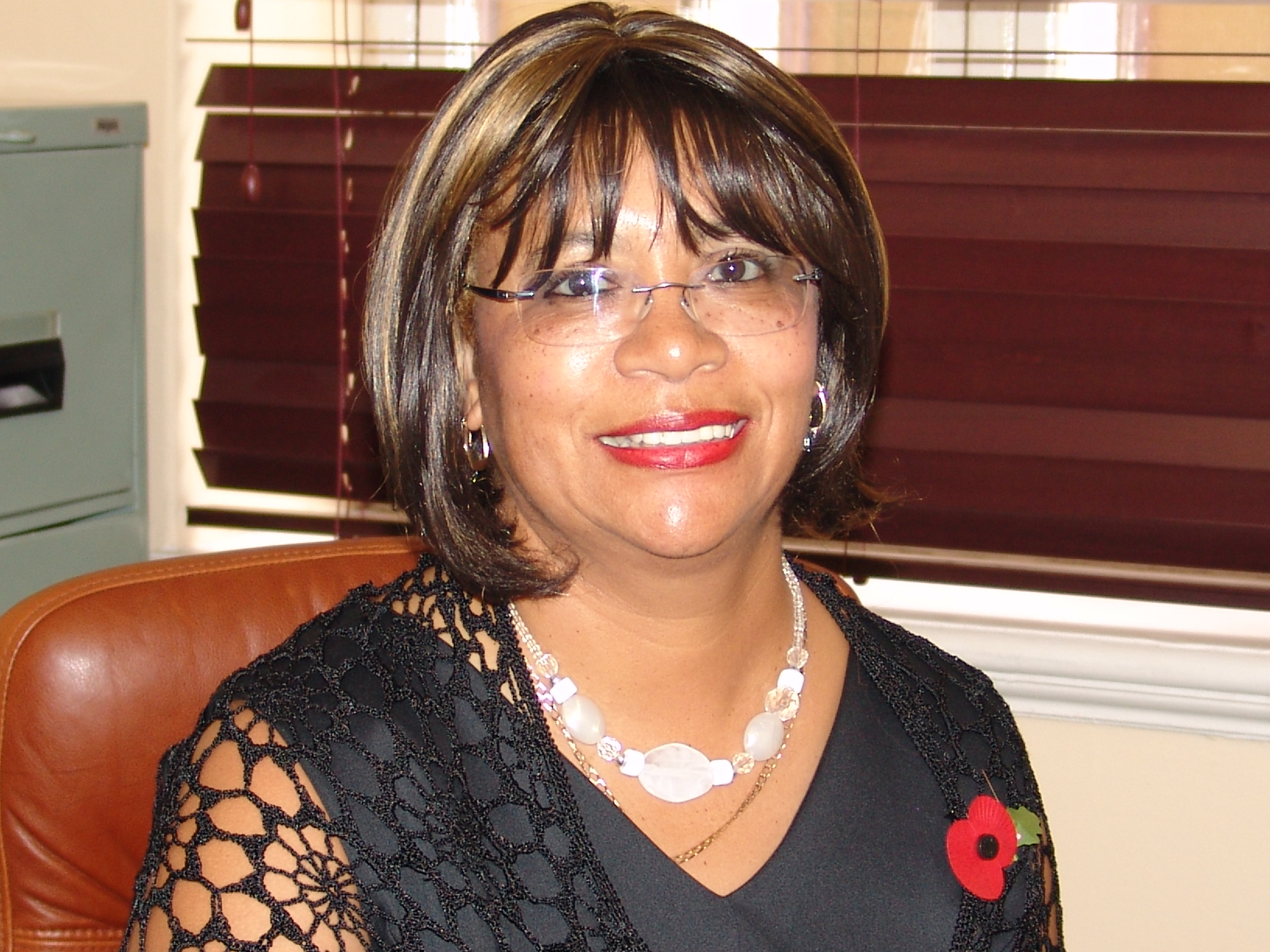
- Abrahams in her parliamentary office in 2010

Member of the National Assembly of South Africa
- In office 21 May 2014 – 7 May 2019

Permanent delegate to the National Council of Provinces from Gauteng
- In office 1 October 2010 – 21 April 2014

Personal details
- Party: African National Congress (2014–present)
- Other party: Democratic Alliance (Until 2014)
- Profession: Politician

Beverley Lynnette Abrahams is a South African politician. She was initially appointed to the National Council of Provinces in October 2010 as a Democratic Alliance representative. She announced her defection to the African National Congress in March 2014. Abrahams was elected to the lower house, the National Assembly, after that year's general election. She left Parliament in May 2019.

== Parliamentary career ==
=== National Council of Provinces ===
Abrahams was a senior member of the Democratic Alliance in Gauteng. In October 2010, she was appointed to the National Council of Provinces as a provincial delegate. She was assigned to serve on the select committees on social services, economic development, trade and international relations, and education and recreation. Abrahams was the constituency contact for the DA's Leneldos region.

On 11 March 2014, Abrahams used her motion to announce her resignation from the DA and subsequent defection to the African National Congress. The DA consequently wrote to the Gauteng Provincial Legislature to remove her as a parliamentarian. Her last day as a delegate was on 21 April 2014.

=== National Assembly ===
Abrahams was placed 118th on the ANC's national list for the 2014 general election. She was elected and took office as an MP on 21 May 2014. During her tenure in the National Assembly, she was a member of both the Portfolio Committee on Social Development and the Portfolio Committee on Sport and Recreation.

Abrahams's name did not appear on the ANC's list for the 2019 general election, and she left Parliament on 7 May 2019.
