= Sonja Boshoff =

South African politician

Sonja Boshoff MP

Permanent Delegate to the National Council of Provinces from Mpumalanga
- Incumbent
- Assumed office 23 May 2019
- In office 4 December 2013 – 6 May 2014

Member of the National Assembly of South Africa
- In office 21 May 2014 – 7 May 2019

Personal details
- Party: Democratic Alliance
- Spouse: Jaap
- Children: 1
- Education: University of South Africa
- Profession: Politician

Hildegard Sonja Boshoff is a South African politician who has served as a permanent delegate to the National Council of Provinces from Mpumalanga twice, from 2013 to 2014 and again since 2019. She served as a member of the National Assembly from 2014 to 2019. Boshoff is a member of the Democratic Alliance.

== Education ==
Boshoff earned a degree in Public Administration and Management from the University of South Africa.

== Political career ==
Boshoff was elected to the Thaba Chweu Local Municipality council in the 2006 municipal elections as a DA councillor. She served as chief whip of the DA caucus and as constituency chair during her time on the council. From 2007 to 2013, she served as provincial coordinator of the Democratic Alliance Women's Network. Boshoff was elected deputy provincial chairperson of the DA at the party's 2011 provincial congress.

== Parliamentary career ==
In December 2013, Boshoff became the DA member of the Mpumalanga provincial delegation to the National Council of Provinces, the upper house of the South African parliament, following Velly Manzini's expulsion from the DA for starting a new political party. Boshoff stood in the 2014 national and provincial elections as a DA parliamentary candidate for the National Assembly, the lower house of parliament, and was elected as the DA retained its position as official opposition to the governing African National Congress. After her swearing-in, she was appointed an alternate member of the Portfolio Committee on Basic Education.

In 2015, Boshoff was elected deputy DA provincial leader to newly elected provincial leader James Masango. She served in the position until the 2018 provincial congress when Trudie Grove-Morgan was elected to succeed her.

In 2017, Boshoff expressed serious concern over the amount of the disabled children waiting to be placed in special schools. She was sceptical over the Department of Basic Education's estimate of 11,000 learners waiting to be placed, saying that the previous figure was over 300,000. In January 2019, Boshoff welcomed the South African Council for Educators' decision to make it a requirement for teachers applying for registration to provide a valid police clearance certificate, and called for current teachers to be subjected to a similar process.

Boshoff was ranked low on the DA's candidate lists for the 2019 general election, therefore she was not re-elected to the National Assembly at the election. After the election, Boshoff was selected to return to the NCOP as the party retained its one seat in the provincial delegation.

== Personal life ==
Bosoff is married to Jaap. They have one son.
