= 2023 South Africa floods =

- Date: 8 February–March; 24–25 September 2023; 30 December 2023
- Location: South Africa
- Deaths: 39 (at least)
- Property damage: US$240 million

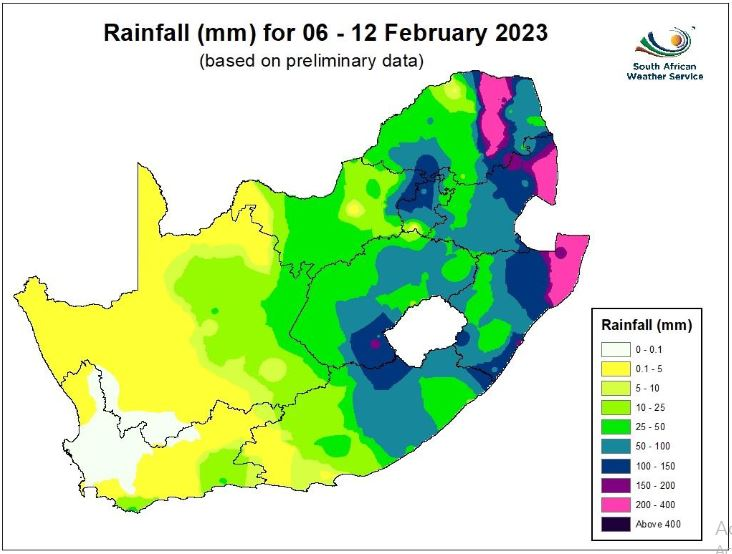
Rainfall (in mm) between 6 and 12 February 2023 in South Africa.

There were floods in South Africa in February and March, then again in September and again in December 2023.

== February–March ==
Floods hit South Africa in February–March 2023, caused by heavy rainfall as a result of the La Niña weather phenomenon, affecting seven provinces, including Eastern Cape, Northern Cape, Mpumalanga, KwaZulu-Natal, and North West. The floods have caused casualties, fatalities and damage to homes, businesses, basic infrastructure, roads, bridges and affected crops and livestock.

At least twelve people were killed across the provinces and others were stated to be missing. In addition to that, two more fatalities were reported in King Sabata Dalindyebo Local Municipality (Eastern Cape Province), and one person in Komani Town (formerly Queenstown). Several people were evacuated in Lekwa Local Municipality and residents in the area of Vaal, Vanderkloof, and Bloemhof dams along the Orange River (Northern Cape Province) were invited to evacuate after controlled water discharge operate by local authorities. In Mpumalanga province, about 300 families have been evacuated.

The South African Weather Service predicted "persistent and heavy" rains ahead, with the risk of further flooding due to "waterlogged soils and saturated rivers".

In response to the floods, President Cyril Ramaphosa declared on February 13 the State of National Disaster in seven provinces.

On 23 March, heavy rainfall caused flash flooding in parts of the Eastern Cape. The worst affected municipalities were Ingquza Hill, King Sabata Dalindyebo, and Port St Johns. Local authorities reported at least three people died and one was reported missing. The flooding caused collapsed bridges, limiting movement in the flood-hit Port St Johns area.

The cost of the damage was estimated to be around R4.5 billion in Eastern Cape and R337 million in Mpumalanga.

== September, Western Cape ==
Further floods hit Western Cape in September 2023.

== December, KwaZulu-Natal ==
On 30 December, Flash flooding killed 21 people in KwaZulu-Natal, South Africa.

== See also ==
- 2022 KwaZulu-Natal floods - deadly floods in 2022
