= Gijimani Skosana =

South African politician

Gijimani Skosana MP

Member of the National Assembly of South Africa
- Incumbent
- Assumed office 2 November 2017

Personal details
- Born: Gijimani Jim Skosana; 9 September 1978 (age 47)
- Party: African National Congress
- Education: Bonginhlanhla High School; CN Mahlangu College; Kutloano ea Kagiso Institute; ICT Institute; University of the Witwatersrand
- Profession: Politician

Gijimani Jim Skosana (born 9 September 1978) is a South African politician from Mpumalanga and a current Member of the National Assembly of South Africa for the African National Congress (ANC). He previously served as the mayor of the Dr JS Moroka Local Municipality from 2016 to 2017.

== Early life and education ==
Gijimani Jim Skosana was born on 9 September 1978. He matriculated from Bonginhlanhla High School. He holds a certificate in mechanical engineering from the CN Mahlangu College, a certificate in Leadership Development from the Kutloano ea Kagiso Institute, and an MSOQ certificate in computer science from the ICT Institute. Skosana also holds a certificate in Municipal Financial Management from the University of the Witwatersrand.

== Political career ==
A member of the African National Congress, Skosana is a current member of the party's regional executive committee in the Nkangala Region in Mpumalanga. He is a former convenor of the African National Congress Youth League's provincial task team. He also served as the regional deputy chairperson of the ANC Youth League in the ANC's Nkangala Region. He was also the Ephraim Mogale district secretary of the Young Communist League of South Africa. While a student at the CN Mahlangu College, he served as the branch secretary of the South African Students Congress.

Skosana was the branch secretary of the ANC's ward 3 branch in the Dr JS Moroka Local Municipality. Before he was elected mayor of the municipality in the August 3, 2016 municipal elections, he was the council speaker.

In March 2017, Skosana was robbed and kidnapped from his house, before being dumped near Kwaggafontein in the Thembisile Hani Local Municipality. He was removed as mayor in September 2017 and replaced with Thulare Madileng.

== Parliamentary career ==
On 2 November 2017, Skosana became a Member of the National Assembly of South Africa, the lower house of parliament. He then became a member of the Portfolio Committee on Justice and Correctional Services, the Joint Standing Committee on Defence, and the Portfolio Committee on Defence and Military Veterans.

Skosana was elected to a full term as a Member of Parliament in the 2019 general election. He is currently a member of the Standing Committee on Finance.

On 21 June 2021, he became an alternate member of the Committee for Section 194 Enquiry. He was reelected in 2024.
