= Grace Tseke =

South African politician

Member of the National Assembly of South Africa
- In office 6 May 2009 – 28 May 2024

Personal details
- Born: Grace Kekulu Tseke
- Party: African National Congress
- Profession: Politician

Grace Kekulu Tseke is a South African politician who served as a Member of Parliament (MP) for the African National Congress from 2009 until 2024.

== Background ==
Tseke earned a University Diploma in Education in 1997, a Diploma in Business Computing in 2004 and a Certificate in Managing the Employment Process in 2006.

Tseke was a ward councillor for the African National Congress from 2000 to 2005, a branch chairperson for the African National Congress Women's League from 2001 to 2002, secretary of the ANC's Greenmara branch from 2001 to 2004, deputy secretary from 2006 to 2008 and the Maretele PCO Administrator from 2004 to 2009.

== Parliamentary career ==
In 2009, Tseke was elected to the National Assembly of South Africa as an ANC representative. During her first term as an MP, she was a member of the Portfolio Committee on Sport and Recreation and the Portfolio Committee on Women, Youth and People with Disabilities.

Tseke was re-elected to parliament in 2014. She was then named to the Portfolio Committee on Women in The Presidency. In 2018, Tseke said that she "can't write a good story" about the Department of Women in the Presidency.

Tseke was re-elected to another term in parliament in 2019. She was named to the Portfolio Committee on Health and the Portfolio Committee on Human Settlements, Water and Sanitation.

In August 2021, Tseke was discharged from the Portfolio Committee on Health and the Portfolio Committee on Human Settlements, Water and Sanitation. She was then appointed to serve on the Committee for Section 194 Enquiry and the newly reestablished Portfolio Committee on Water and Sanitation.

Tseke was ranked 10th on the ANC's Mpumalanga regional-to-national list for the 2024 general election. She did not secure reelection as the ANC won only 8 regional seats.
