= Doris Dlakude =

South African politician

The Honourable Doris Mpapane MP

Deputy Chief Whip of the Majority Party
- Incumbent
- Assumed office 20 June 2013
- President: Jacob Zuma; Cyril Ramaphosa
- Chief Whip: Mathole Motshekga; Stone Sizani; Jackson Mthembu; Pemmy Majodina
- Preceded by: Mmamoloko Kubayi (acting); Bulelani Magwanishe

Member of the National Assembly
- Incumbent
- Assumed office 9 February 2010
- Constituency: Mpumalanga

Personal details
- Born: 16 August 1969 (age 56)
- Party: African National Congress
- Spouse: Vusi Dlakude

Doris Eunice Mpapane (born 16 August 1969), sometimes also spelled Dorris or Dorries, is a South African politician from Mpumalanga. She is the Deputy Chief Whip of the Majority Party in the National Assembly. She was appointed to that position in June 2013, representing the African National Congress, and she has been a Member of Parliament since February 2010.

== Early life and education ==
Born on 16 August 1969, Mpapane matriculated at Mjokwane Senior Secondary School in Komatipoort in the former Eastern Transvaal. She has an Honours degree in governance and leadership from the University of the Witwatersrand.

== Early political career ==
Mpapane held a variety of positions in her political party, the African National Congress (ANC); she was regional treasurer of the ANC Youth League in Ehlanzeni, was on the Provincial Executive Committee of the ANC and ANC Women's League in Mpumalanga, and spent six terms as the secretary of her local ANC branch. She joined the National Assembly on 9 February 2010, filling the casual vacancy caused by Nomatyala Hangana's resignation.

== Deputy Chief Whip: 2013–present ==
On 20 June 2013, the ANC announced that Mpapane would take office as Deputy Chief Whip of the Majority Party; she deputised Stone Sizani, who was also newly appointed, and replaced Mmamoloko Kubayi, who had been acting in the position. Both Sizani and Mpapane were reappointed after the 2014 general election, but Sizani resigned on 2 March 2016; Mpapane subsequently acted as Chief Whip until Jackson Mthembu was appointed to the position three weeks later.

During this period, Mpapane was on the ad hoc parliamentary committee established to respond to Nkandlagate. She defended President Jacob Zuma during the committee's debates, but she and Kubayi also drew media attention in July 2016 for being photographed painting their nails during the committee's proceedings.

After the 2019 general election, Pemmy Majodina was appointed as Chief Whip and Mpapane stayed on as her deputy. John Steenhuisen, the leader of the opposition Democratic Alliance, said that he thought the ANC "missed a trick in Doris Dlakude... who would have made an excellent chief whip".

== Personal life ==
She is married to Vusi Dlakude, who appeared in the Nkomazi Magistrate's Court on a perjury charge, accused of faking a hijacking, in January 2018. She owns a funeral parlour.
