= Sibongiseni Dhlomo =

South African politician

Sibongiseni Dhlomo MP
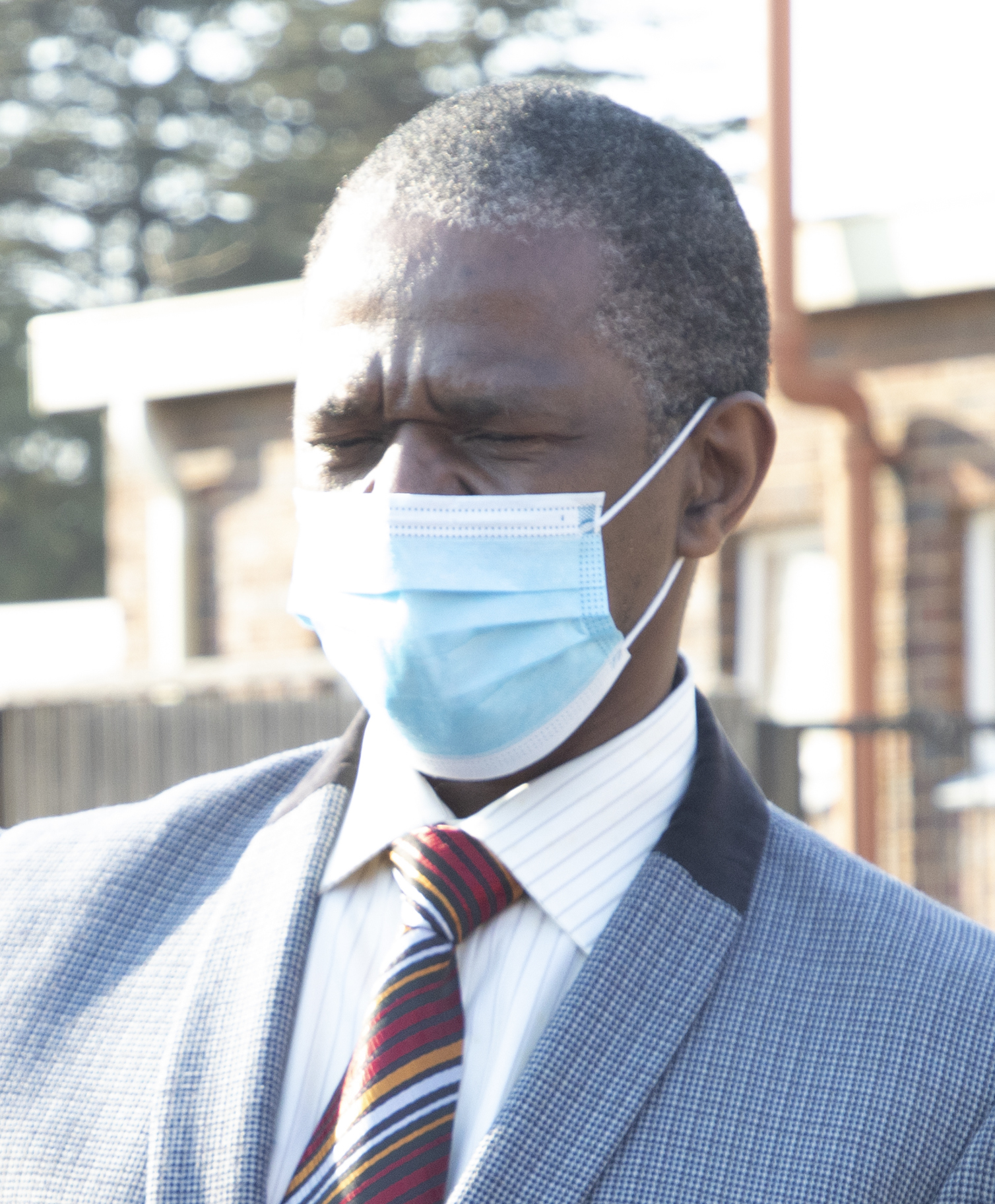

Deputy Minister of Health
- In office 6 August 2021 – 19 June 2024
- President: Cyril Ramaphosa
- Minister: Joe Phaahla
- Preceded by: Joe Phaahla

Personal details
- Party: African National Congress
- Spouse: Nono MaDlamini
- Children: Sinethemba, Sikhumbuzo, Siphephelo and Sakhelihle Dhlomo
- Occupation: Politician; medical doctor

Sibongiseni Dhlomo (born 10 December 1959) is a South African politician and medical doctor for the African National Congress. Dhlomo is a former deputy minister of health for the Republic of South Africa.

== Early life ==
Dhlomo was born in Umbumbulu in the South African province of KwaZulu-Natal. He attended Dlangezwa High School on an Illovo Sugar Mill bursary, where he met his wife, Nono MaDlamini.

== Education ==
He studied medicine at the University of Natal from 1980 to 1985, and later achieved a Bachelor of Arts degree from the University of South Africa while incarcerated at Robben Island, majoring in psychology and sociology, and attained master's degree in public health from MEDUNSA. He also has a diploma in forensic pathology.

== Career ==
Dhlomo served in the South African National Defence Force, where he was bestowed a rank of a brigadier general.

He was the deputy city manager responsible for health and social services in the eThekwini Metro Municipality.

He was a chairperson of the eThekwini ANC Region and a regional treasurer of Emalahleni ANC Region for two terms.

=== National health ===
Dhlomo was the chairperson of the Parliamentary Health Portfolio Committee.

On 6 August 2021, after former Deputy Joe Phaahla was promoted to head the Department of Health, Sibongiseni Dhlomo took his place as Deputy Minister of Health.

He retired from active politics and MEC on September 30, 2025

== Politics ==
Dhlomo supports the NHI Bill that seeks to nationalise all healthcare in South Africa, and the establishment of a state-owned pharmaceutical company.
