= Cedric Frolick =

South African politician

The Honorable Cedric Frolick MP
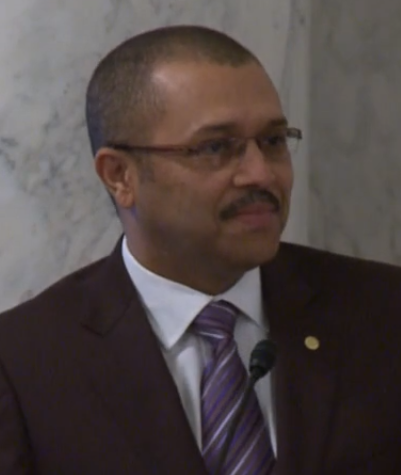
- Frolick in 2014

House Chairperson of the National Assembly of South Africa
- Incumbent
- Assumed office 18 November 2010 Serving with Werner Horn (2024-present), Zandile Majozi (2024-present) and Grace Boroto (2014-2019)
- Speaker: Baleka Mbete; Thandi Modise; Nosiviwe Mapisa-Nqakula

Member of the National Assembly of South Africa
- Incumbent
- Assumed office 18 November 2010
- Constituency: Eastern Cape

Personal details
- Born: Cedric Thomas Frolick; 20 January 1967 (age 59) Port Elizabeth, Eastern Cape, South Africa
- Party: African National Congress
- Education: University of Port Elizabeth
- Occupation: Politician • Anti-apartheid activist
- Profession: Teacher

Cedric Thomas Frolick (born 20 January 1967), is the current House Chairperson: Committees, Oversight and ICT in the National Assembly of Parliament for the Republic of South Africa. A teacher, politician, anti-apartheid activist. He retired from teaching in 1999 and subsequently became a politician in the National Assembly. On 18 November 2010, the ANC appointed him as the House Chairperson responsible for Committees, ICT and Oversight.

== Biography ==
Frolick was born in the Northern Areas of Port Elizabeth, Eastern Cape in Schauderville in 1967. He attended the De Vos Malan Primary School in Schauderville and progressed to matriculate at the David Livingstone Senior Secondary School with exemption in 1984. He then studied at the University of Port Elizabeth (currently Nelson Mandela Metropolitan University) from 1985 to 1988 and was conferred a Bachelor of Arts degree with majors in Geography and Psychology in 1987, a Higher Diploma in Education (post-grad) in 1988 and a Bachelor of Education (Honours) degree in 1992 and is currently completing a Masters of Philosophy in International Political Economy there.

== Teaching career ==
Upon obtaining his Higher Diploma in Education in 1988, Frolick started his teaching career in 1989 at Booysen Park High School in Port Elizabeth. In 1992 Frolick was appointed the Head of Department for Geography at Hillside High School. In 1995 Frolick was appointed Deputy Principal at Hillside High School and was appointed as Acting Principal there in 1998. He retired from the teaching profession in 1999 and pursued a political career.

== Political career ==
In 1992, Frolick joined the African National Congress (ANC) and was elected as a Member of Parliament in 1999. He was a delegate at the following:

- in 2003 at the ANC Eastern Cape Provincial Conferences at St. Albans and Umtata
- in 2005 ANC National General Council in Pretoria
- in 2006 ANC Eastern Cape Provincial Conference at Fort Hare
- in 2006 ANC Policy Conference at Gallagher Estate
- to the 53rd ANC National Conference in 2007 at Polokwane
- to the 2009 ANC Eastern Cape Provincial Conference in East London
- to the 2010 ANC National General Council in Durban.

He is a member of the Regional Executive Committee of the ANC for the Nelson Mandela Region and also served as a member of the ANC National Executive Committee Task Team in the Eastern Cape.

He was appointed as the representative of the Parliament of the Republic of South Africa on the IPU/United Nations Advisory Group. He has participated in study group tours and numerous Inter-Parliamentary Union Seminars and has been a delegate to the Commonwealth Parliamentary Association.

== Parliamentary experience ==
Frolick served on the following Portfolio Committees: Sport & Recreation, Public Enterprises and Trade & Industry, and was the deputy chairperson for the Sport & Recreation Portfolio Committee.

In June 2003 he was appointed as ANC Whip for Sport & Recreation and Whip responsible for Legislation in the National Assembly. He was re-elected for a second-term in April 2004 and was appointed ANC Whip for Sport & Recreation and ANC Whip responsible for Questions to the Presidency & the Executive, Motions & Members’ Statements. He also served as the ANC Cluster Whip on Social Transformation and served as an additional member of the NEC Sub-Committee on Social Transformation.

He served on the multi-party Chief Whips Forum and the ANC Strategy Committee in Parliament. He was again y re-elected to Parliament in April 2009 and appointed Senior ANC National Assembly Programming Whip in May 2009. During the ANC re-shuffle in November 2010 he was appointed as the National Assembly House Chairperson for Committee's, ICT and Oversight. There he has advocated for tackling global warming and implementing the Millennium Development Goals.

== State Capture ==
During South Africa's commission of inquiry into State Capture in 2019, Frolick was named by Angelo Agrizzi as having received money to influence MPs favourably for the company Bosasa. Agrizzi testified that he repeatedly paid Frolick in cash directly and through Frolick's brother. The final report of the Inquiry published in 2022 found that Frolick's version was 'self-serving' and recommended a further investigation into his conduct. In 2023 Parliament's ethics committee cleared Frolick of the allegations but did not provide any reasons and the process was not made public.

== National sports involvement ==
From 1996 to 1999, he served as the Eastern Province High Schools Cricket Chairperson and from 1998 until 1999 served on the United Schools Sports Association of South Africa Cricket Committee responsible for U/15 Cricket and the annual PG Bison Week.

He was instrumental in securing the International Rugby Board Sevens in Nelson Mandela Bay, resulting in the city beating Cape Town who was the favourite since the start.
