= Thandi Memela =

South African politician (1939–2021)

Member of the National Assembly of South Africa
- In office 7 May 2009 – 21 May 2019

Personal details
- Born: 8 January 1939
- Died: 7 January 2021 (aged 81)

Thandi Memela (8 January 1939 – 7 January 2021) was a South African politician from KwaZulu-Natal. A member of South Africa's African National Congress (ANC), she served as a Member of the National Assembly of South Africa from 2009 until 2019. She was also the inaugural Deputy President of the ANC Veterans' League between 2009 and 2017.

Memela died in 2021 at the age of 81.
