= Watty Watson =

South African politician, former Chief Whip of the Official Opposition

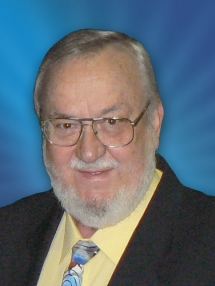

Chief Whip of the Official Opposition
- In office 27 October 2011 – 6 May 2014
- Preceded by: Ian Davidson
- Succeeded by: John Steenhuisen

Personal details
- Born: 26 November 1944 Matatiele, South Africa
- Died: 12 October 2014 (aged 69) Pretoria, South Africa
- Party: Democratic Alliance (2000–2014)
- Other political affiliations: New National Party (1997–2000); National Party (South Africa) (Prior to 1997)
- Spouse: Madeleine
- Children: 2
- Education: Port Natal High School; University of Pretoria
- Occupation: Politician

Armiston "Watty" Watson (26 November 1944 – 12 October 2014) was a South African politician and Democratic Alliance stalwart. He served as the Chief Whip of the Official Opposition in the National Assembly from 2011 to 2014 under the leadership of Lindiwe Mazibuko. He was first elected to Parliament in 1994 as an MP for the National Party of South Africa. Watson was a founding member of the Democratic Alliance and served as the party's leader in the National Council of Provinces prior to being selected as Chief Whip of the party's National Assembly caucus. Watson left Parliament after the May 2014 elections and died in October of the same year.

== Early life ==
Armiston Watson was born in Matatiele. When he was approximately eight years old, his family moved to Lesotho. They later returned to South Africa. Watson matriculated from Port Natal High School and went on to study at the University of Pretoria where he studied commerce and management.

He worked for the maize board until 1965. He later worked for Paragon Business Forms. The company soon promoted him from sales representative to head of sales and marketing. From 1981 to 1997, he worked for the Kontra Group.

== Political career ==
Watson was mostly involved with the local politics of Mpumalanga. He served on the Transvaal Roads Board and the Nature Conservation Committee.

Watson was Deputy Mayor of the Marloth Park Local Council. He was then elected to the Onderberg Local Government Council and the Lowveld and Escarpment Regional Services Council. Watson served as Leader of the Opposition during his tenure on the Metsweding District Council.

Watson was elected a Member of Parliament in the 1994 general election. He represented the National Party and later on the New National Party. He joined the Democratic Alliance following the formation of the party and was later appointed the leader of the party's caucus in the National Council of Provinces.

In 2011, he was selected to be Chief Whip of the Democratic Alliance caucus in the National Assembly. He served in the position until he left Parliament in 2014.

== Death and legacy ==
Watson died on 12 October 2014 in hospital in Pretoria following complications of a fall he had at his home, which broke his vertebra. Watson also had diabetes. Upon his death, the Federal Chairperson of the Democratic Alliance, Wilmot James, and the Office of the ANC Chief Whip released statements in which they praised and remembered Watson.
