= Grace Boroto =

South African politician

Member of Parliament from Mpumalanga
- In office 2014–2024

Personal details
- Party: ANC

Mmatlala Grace Boroto is a South African politician who served as a Member of Parliament (MP) for the African National Congress.
