= Fasiha Hassan =

South African lawyer and politician

The Honourable Fasiha Hassan MP
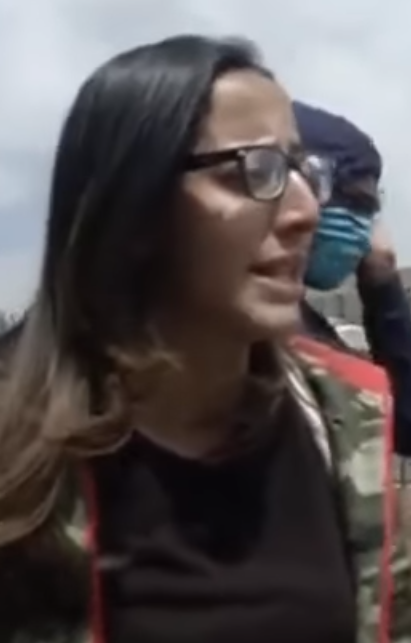
- Hassan in 2016

Member of the National Assembly
- Incumbent
- Assumed office 14 June 2024

Member of the Gauteng Provincial Legislature
- In office 22 May 2019 – 28 May 2024

Personal details
- Born: Fasiha Hassan; 26 November 1993 (age 32)
- Citizenship: South Africa
- Party: African National Congress
- Spouse: Sikhulekile Duma (m. 2023)
- Education: University of the Witwatersrand

Fasiha Hassan (born 26 November 1993) is a South African politician and former student activist. She has represented the African National Congress (ANC) in the National Assembly since June 2024 and formerly represented the party in the Gauteng Provincial Legislature between 2019 and 2024. She rose to national prominence as a student at the University of the Witwatersrand, where she was secretary general of the student representative council during the #FeesMustFall student protests of 2016.

== Early life and student activism ==
Born on 26 November 1993, Hassan became politically active as a student activist at the University of the Witwatersrand (Wits), initially through the Palestinian solidarity movement. She was the first female president of the university's Muslim Students' Association in 2013, and she went on to join the provincial leadership of the South African Students Congress in Gauteng.

Most prominently, Hassan served two terms as a member of the Wits student representative council. Representing the Progressive Youth Alliance, she was elected as the council's academic officer in September 2014, under council president Mcebo Dlamini, and the following year she ascended to the position of secretary general, under president Nompendulo Mkhatshwa. In 2016 she gained national media attention as a leader in the ongoing #FeesMustFall student protests.

When her year-long term as secretary general ended, Hassan remained active in student politics as deputy president of the South African Union of Students. She graduated at the end of 2017 with a Bachelor of Laws and a Bachelor of Commerce in law, marketing and finance. She later received the Norwegian Student Peace Prize for her "nonviolent efforts towards gaining equal access to higher education".

== Political career ==
After her graduation, Hassan joined ENSafrica as a candidate attorney, but she did not complete her articles of clerkship. Instead, in August 2018, the African National Congress (ANC) announced that Hassan would join the party's communications unit ahead of the May 2019 general election. Confronted with criticism from elements of the FMF movement, she said that she shared the ANC's commitment to "social justice and a pro-poor agenda" and that, notwithstanding FMF's deliberately non-partisan character, "We were all ANC members before FMF, we were ANC members during FMF and we remain ANC members now."

=== Gauteng Provincial Legislature: 2019–2024 ===
Hassan stood as an ANC candidate in the May 2019 election and was elected to a seat in the Gauteng Provincial Legislature. The Sunday Times reported that, aged 25, she became the youngest ever MPL in South Africa. She was appointed as head of political education in the ANC caucus in the legislature. She also sat on the legislature's education committee and later chaired its economic development committee and then its cooperative governance committee.

She also . In 2022, she was appointed to the ANC's Renewal Commission. In March 2023, she was appointed to the National Youth Task Team, the interim body tasked with leading the ANC Youth League while it organised its overdue elective conference; she deputised Xola Nqola as deputy convener of the task team. She was also viewed as a possible candidate to stand for the league's presidency, but Collen Malatji was elected unopposed when the elective conference was held in July 2023. Instead, Hassan was elected as an ordinary member of the ANC Youth League's National Executive Committee; she was the most popular ordinary member by number of votes received. As deputy convenor she also delivered a political report to the elective conference: in her speech, she argued that the league should lobby for a Pan-African Youth Union boycott of Morocco, in protest of the Western Sahara occupation, and that it should lobby for the establishment of a BRICS youth secretariat. She also spoke in support of the South Africa's non-aligned stance in the Russia–Ukraine war.

=== National Assembly: 2024–present ===
In the May 2024 general election, Hassan was elected to a seat in the National Assembly, the lower house of the South African Parliament. She was ranked 65th on the ANC's national party list in the election. Upon her election she said that her policy priorities would be education, youth unemployment, and climate justice.

In Parliament, she serves as a whip in the ANC caucus and sits on the Portfolio Committee on Mineral and Petroleum Resources and Portfolio Committee on Electricity and Energy. The ANC also nominated her to represent Parliament as a member of the Judicial Service Commission.

== Personal life ==
Hassan is Muslim. She identifies as black and Indian.
