= Brigitte Mabandla =

South African politician (born 1948)

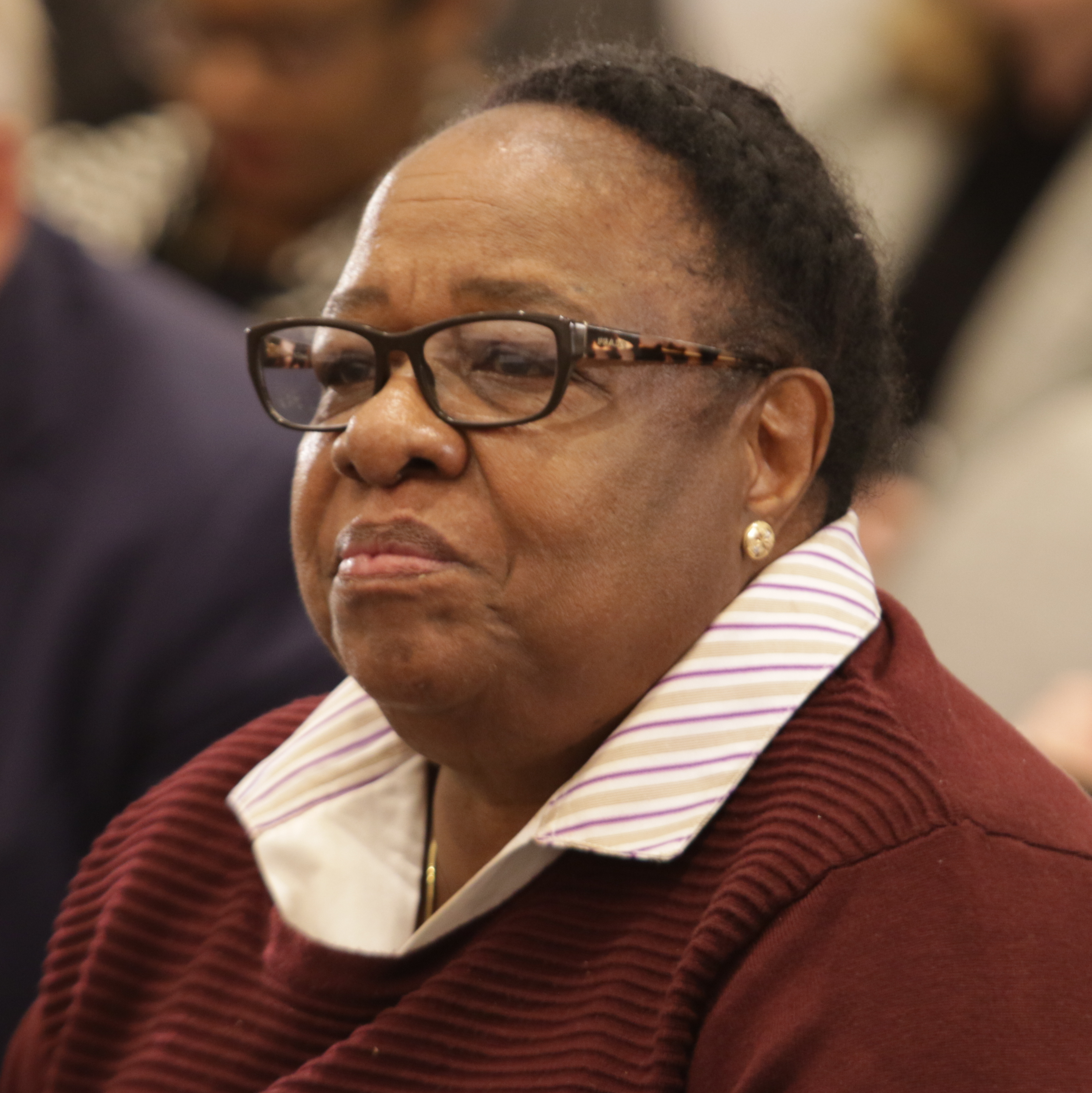
- in 2018

Minister of Public Enterprises
- In office 25 September 2008 – 10 May 2009
- President: Kgalema Motlanthe
- Preceded by: Alec Erwin
- Succeeded by: Barbara Hogan

Minister of Justice and Constitutional Development
- In office 29 April 2004 – 25 September 2008
- President: Thabo Mbeki
- Deputy: Johnny de Lange
- Preceded by: Penuell Maduna
- Succeeded by: Enver Surty

Minister of Housing
- In office 26 February 2003 – 28 April 2004
- President: Thabo Mbeki
- Preceded by: Sankie Mthembi-Mahanyele
- Succeeded by: Lindiwe Sisulu

Deputy Minister of Arts, Culture, Science and Technology
- In office 18 April 1995 – 25 February 2003
- President: Nelson Mandela; Thabo Mbeki
- Minister: Ben Ngubane; Lionel Mtshali
- Preceded by: Winnie Mandela

Member of the National Assembly
- In office 9 May 1994 – 5 May 2009

Personal details
- Born: 23 November 1948 (age 77) Durban, Natal; Union of South Africa
- Party: African National Congress
- Spouse: Lindilwe Mabandla (m. 1972)
- Education: University of Zambia

Brigitte Sylvia Mabandla (born 23 November 1948) is a South African politician, lawyer and former anti-apartheid activist who served in the cabinet of South Africa from 2003 to 2009, including as the Minister of Justice and Constitutional Development from 2004 to 2008. She became the South African Ambassador to Sweden in January 2020. A veteran of the African National Congress (ANC), she was an elected member of party's National Executive Committee between 1997 and 2012.

Born in Durban, Mabandla entered politics through the South African Students' Organisation at the University of the North before she went into exile with the ANC in 1975. After a decade studying and teaching law in Botswana and Zambia, she was a legal adviser to the ANC in Lusaka from 1986 to 1990. Thereafter she joined the party's delegation to the negotiations to end apartheid, where she took particular interest in the protection of women's and children's rights. She joined the National Assembly in the April 1994 general election and, after a brief period as a backbencher, she was appointed to the Government of National Unity by President Nelson Mandela, who named her as Deputy Minister of Arts, Culture, Science and Technology in 1995.

After serving in the arts and culture portfolio from 1995 to 2003, Mabandla was appointed to the cabinet of President Thabo Mbeki as Minister of Housing from 2003 to 2004. After the April 2004 general election, Mbeki appointed her as South Africa's first woman Minister of Justice, in which capacity she had a difficult and controversial relationship with the National Prosecuting Authority and its head, Vusi Pikoli. She was justice minister until September 2008, when she became Minister of Public Enterprises in the cabinet of President Kgalema Motlanthe. She resigned from legislative politics after the April 2009 general election.

== Early life and education ==
Mabandla was born on 23 November 1948 in Durban in the former Natal Province. She attended the University of the North at Turfloop but was excluded for her political activities; later, while in exile, she completed an LLB at the University of Zambia in 1979.

== Apartheid-era activism and career ==
Mabandla rose to political prominence at Turfloop as an activist in the South African Students' Organisation (SASO), an anti-apartheid organisation of the Black Consciousness Movement. After she was excluded from university, she returned to Natal, where she lived in an informal settlement in Lamontville and worked briefly as youth coordinator at the Institute of Race Relations in Durban between 1974 and 1975. She also remained active in SASO: in September 1974, she was a member of the SASO committee that organised the "Viva FRELIMO" rallies in Durban and Turfloop, and she and her husband were among the activists who was arrested after the rallies. She was detained for five months and three weeks, during which time she was not permitted to see her five-month-old daughter, her firstborn child. She was also tortured by police on several occasions during her detention. Although she did not herself testify before the post-apartheid Truth and Reconciliation Commission, a Security Branch officer applied for amnesty, saying that he had participated in her torture; he died before his application was heard.

Mabandla and her husband were released under banning orders in 1975, and, later that year, they left South Africa to go into exile elsewhere in Southern Africa, both to evade police harassment and to join the outlawed African National Congress (ANC). Mabandla later said that in the ANC, "my life changed. I was exposed to a different kind of education, to politics, political economy, contesting ideologies, and ideologies of the world." After completing her LLB, she became an academic, lecturing English and law at the Botswana Polytechnic from 1981 to 1983 and then lecturing commercial law at the Botswana Institute of Administration and Commerce from 1983 to 1986. Her research interests included human rights, children's rights, and constitutional law. In 1986, she moved to the ANC's headquarters in Lusaka, Zambia, where she became a legal adviser to the party's internal department of legal and constitutional affairs.

In 1990, Mabandla left her legal adviser post to join the ANC's delegation to the negotiations to end apartheid. During this period, she was also a member's of the party's constitutional committee. According to Mabandla, she took seriously O. R. Tambo's advice to ensure that women's rights and children's rights were adequately protected in the post-apartheid constitution. She worked closely with non-governmental organisations and the ANC Women's League in this capacity. At the same time, she worked on research in related areas at the Community Law Centre of the University of the Western Cape.

== National Assembly: 1994–2009 ==
In South Africa's first post-apartheid elections in May 1994, Mabandla was elected to represent the ANC in the National Assembly, the lower house of the new South African Parliament. During her first year in the assembly, Mabandla was a member of the Portfolio Committee on Justice, as well as of an ad hoc committee on the legal status of abortion. She was viewed as a likely candidate for later appointment to the Human Rights Commission.

=== Deputy minister: 1995–2003 ===
However, in March 1995, President Nelson Mandela announced that Mabandla would join the Government of National Unity as Deputy Minister of Arts, Culture, Science and Technology. Her promotion to this position was viewed as surprising, although the Mail & Guardian described her as "one of the more prominent and most highly-regarded women in the African National Congress caucus". She replaced Winnie Mandela, who, aggrieved by her own departure, said that Mabandla's appointment was "irregular and unconstitutional". She was retained in the same position under the cabinet of Mandela's successor, President Thabo Mbeki, who took office after the June 1999 general election.

Mabandla reportedly worked well with the minister in her portfolio, Ben Ngubane of the opposition Inkatha Freedom Party. She later said that her proudest achievements in the office included the successful campaign to have Sarah Baartman's remains repatriated from the Musée de l'Homme to South Africa.

During this period, Mabandla was additionally a member of the National Executive Committee of the ANC. She was directly elected onto the body for the first time at the party's 50th National Conference in December 1997, ranked 34th by popularity of the 60 members; she was also elected to the influential National Working Committee. In December 2002, she was re-elected to the National Executive Committee, ranked 27th, and to the National Working Committee.

=== Minister of Housing: 2003–2004 ===
In February 2003, in a minor cabinet reshuffle, Mabandla replaced Sankie Mthembi-Mahanyele as Minister of Housing. She remained in that office only until the April 2004 general election.

=== Minister of Justice: 2004–2008 ===
After the 2004 election, President Mbeki appointed Mabandla to his second cabinet in a key portfolio as Minister of Justice and Constitutional Development. The Mail & Guardian said that, during her four years in that office, she "was widely seen as an indecisive underperformer".

==== Scorpions and arrest of Jackie Selebi ====
Her term was dominated by public controversies arising from law enforcement investigations into prominent political figures, particularly by the Scorpions, a specialised anti-corruption unit of the National Prosecuting Authority (NPA). When Mbeki appointed the Khampepe Commission to review the structure and mandate of the Scorpions in 2005, Mabandla told commission chair judge Sisi Khampepe that the relationship between the Scorpions and the police had "irretrievably broken down" and that she would support merging the Scorpions into the South African Police Service. Although the commission did not accept her recommendation, journalists suspected, and Mabandla later confirmed, that her testimony to the Khampepe Commission had lasting damage on her relationship with Vusi Pikoli, the head of the NPA. Observers also surmised that Mabandla, as the NPA's political head, felt that Pikoli excluded her from decision-making, particularly in high-profile cases and particularly by comparison with the close relationship between their respective predecessors, Bulelani Ngcuka and Minister Penuell Maduna.

On 24 September, President Mbeki suspended Pikoli as the head of the NPA, citing "an irretrievable breakdown" in his relationship with Mabandla. However, there was widespread suspicion that his suspension was related to the fact that, earlier the same week, he had obtained a warrant to arrest one of Mbeki's allies, National Police Commissioner Jackie Selebi, on corruption charges; Pikoli himself agreed with this interpretation. During later investigations, Scorpion Gerrie Nel said that Mabandla had met with the Scorpions team in June 2007 and had agreed that there was a strong case but had expressed concern that Selebi's arrest would "shake the foundations of this country". Pikoli, moreover, revealed that Mabandla had written to him on 18 September 2007 with an instruction not to pursue Selebi's prosecution until, in the words of her letter, she was "satisfied that indeed the public interest will be served should you go ahead" and "that sufficient evidence exists". Pikoli's lawyer, Wim Trengove, argued that Mabandla's instruction constituted a clear infringement on the constitutional independence of the NPA. Nonetheless, Frene Ginwala, who chaired an inquiry into the saga, largely cleared Mabanda, finding instead that she had been misled by Menzi Simelane, the director-general of the Justice Department, who Ginwala said had misunderstood the department's proper role and had withheld information from her.

==== Concurrent positions ====
Amid this controversy, Mabandla attended the ANC's 52nd National Conference, held in December 2007 in Polokwane. Unlike most of Mbeki's other cabinet ministers, she made a strong showing in the National Executive Committee elections and was elected to her third term, now ranked ninth of 80. However, she did not gain re-election to the National Working Committee. In addition, she served as the first woman president of the Asian–African Legal Consultative Organisation, gaining election to that office at the organisation's 46th session in Cape Town in 2007.

=== Minister of Public Enterprises: 2008–2009 ===
When Mbeki resigned from the presidency at the ANC's request in September 2008, Mabandla was among the minority of ministers who did not submit their own resignations in response. Mbeki was succeeded by President Kgalema Motlanthe, who, on 25 September, announced that Mabandla would succeed Alec Erwin as the Minister of Public Enterprises in his new cabinet. She was replaced as justice minister by Enver Surty, who oversaw the disbanding of the Scorpions, while her major task in her new portfolio was the management of power utility Eskom amid the ongoing energy crisis in South Africa. She vacated her parliamentary seat and cabinet office after the April 2009 general election.

== Later career and diplomacy ==
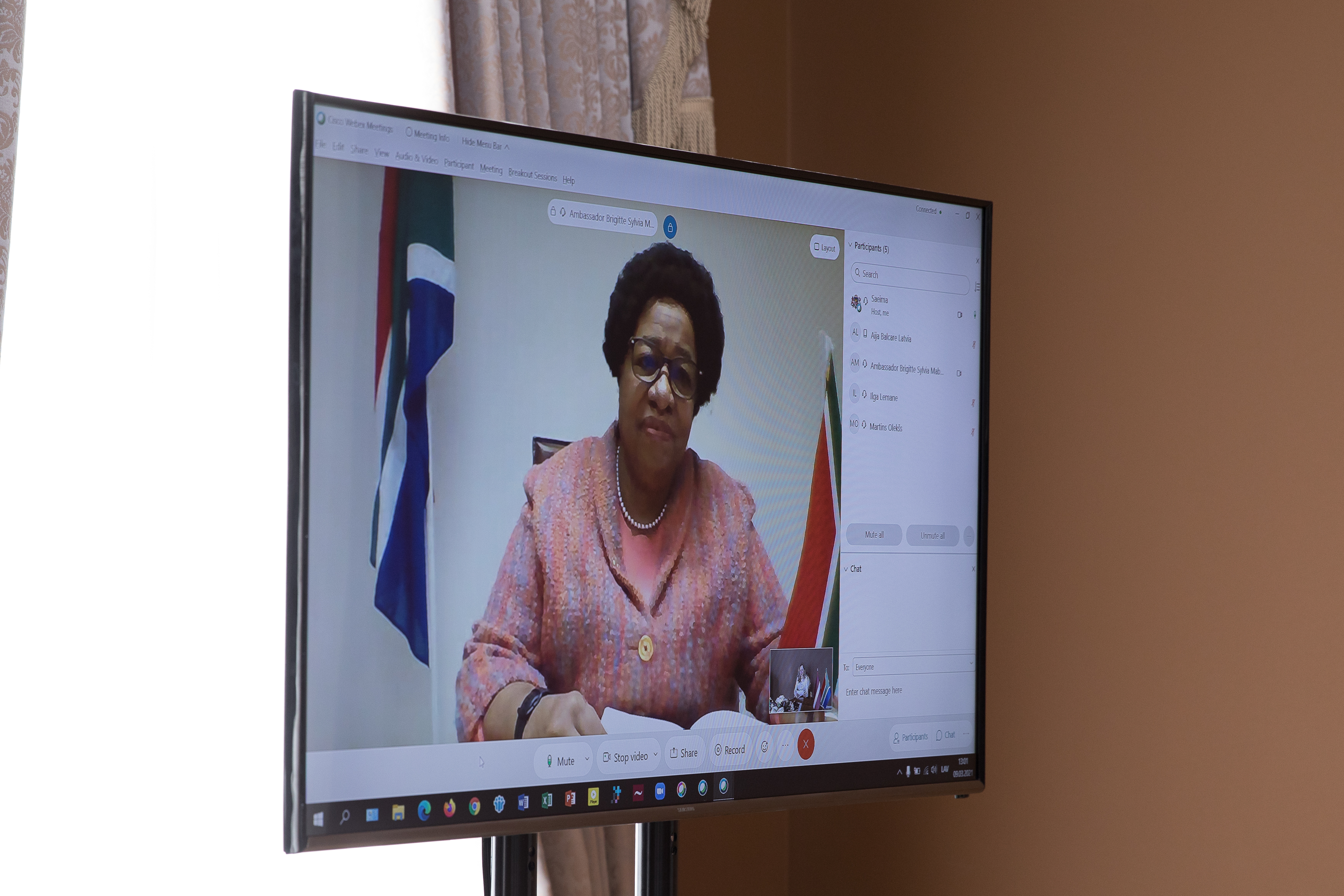
Mabandla during a virtual meeting with Inese Lībiņa-Egnere in March 2021

After leaving frontline politics, Mabandla continued her public service in various capacities: President Jacob Zuma appointed her as chairperson of the National Orders Advisory Council in October 2014, and in January 2015, the 22nd African Peer Review Mechanism (APRM) Forum Summit appointed her to succeed Baleka Mbete as a member of the APRM's Panel of Eminent Persons. In January 2016, she was appointed to a 17-person high-level panel that was chaired by former President Motlanthe and tasked by Parliament with assessing key legislation and its efficacy.

In 2020, she was designated as South African Ambassador to Sweden by President Cyril Ramaphosa. She presented her credentials at the Stockholm Palace on 16 January. She also remained active in the ANC, and in July 2018 she was appointed to deputise George Mashamba as deputy chairperson of the party's internal Integrity Commission.

== Personal life ==
In 1972, Mabandla married Lindilwe Mabandla, an activist whom she had met in the South African Students' Movement. They have children.
