= Andries Nel =

South African politician (born 1965)

The Honourable Andries Nel MP

Deputy Minister of Justice and Constitutional Development
- Incumbent
- Assumed office 3 July 2024
- President: Cyril Ramaphosa
- Minister: Mmamoloko Kubayi
- Preceded by: John Jeffery
- In office 11 May 2009 – 9 July 2013
- President: Jacob Zuma
- Minister: Jeff Radebe
- Preceded by: Johnny de Lange
- Succeeded by: John Jeffery

Member of the National Assembly
- Incumbent
- Assumed office 14 June 2024
- In office 9 May 1994 – 7 May 2019

Deputy Minister of Cooperative Governance and Traditional Affairs
- In office 9 July 2013 – 25 May 2019 Serving with Obed Bapela (since May 2014)
- President: Jacob Zuma; Cyril Ramaphosa
- Minister: Lech Tsenoli; Pravin Gordhan; Des van Rooyen; Zweli Mkhize
- Preceded by: Yunus Carrim
- Succeeded by: Parks Tau

Deputy Chief Whip of the Majority Party
- In office April 2002 – October 2008
- President: Thabo Mbeki; Kgalema Motlanthe
- Chief Whip: Nosiviwe Mapisa-Nqakula; Nathi Nhleko; Mbulelo Goniwe; Isaac Mogase; Nathi Mthethwa
- Preceded by: Geoff Doidge
- Succeeded by: Bulelani Magwanishe

Personal details
- Born: Andries Carl Nel; 2 October 1965 (age 60) New Orleans, Louisiana; United States of America
- Citizenship: South African
- Party: African National Congress
- Other political affiliations: South African Communist Party
- Spouse: Kim Robinson (m. 2005)

Andries Carl Nel (born 2 October 1965) is a South African politician who is currently serving as the Deputy Minister of Justice and Constitutional Development. He is a member of the African National Congress (ANC) and was a human rights lawyer during apartheid.

Nel previously served in the National Assembly of South Africa between May 1994 and May 2019. During his first 15 years as a legislator, he was Deputy Chief Whip of the Majority Party from April 2002 to October 2008 and house chairperson in the National Assembly from October 2008 to April 2009. After the April 2009 general election, he joined the national executive under President Jacob Zuma, serving as Deputy Minister of Justice and Constitutional Development between 2009 and 2013 and then as Deputy Minister of Cooperative Governance and Traditional Affairs between 2013 and 2019.

Between 2019 and 2024, Nel left frontline politics to work in Luthuli House in the office of the ANC secretary-general. He returned to Parliament in the May 2024 general election, after which President Cyril Ramaphosa appointed him to return to his former position as Deputy Minister of Justice.

== Early life and career ==
Nel was born on 2 October 1965 in the American city of New Orleans, Louisiana. His father, Nicolaas Nel, a South African diplomat from an Afrikaner family, was serving as consul in New Orleans at the time. He attended high school in São Paulo, Brazil, where he became interested in politics. Thereafter he studied law at the University of Pretoria, where he completed a Bachelor of Civil Law. During his education in South Africa, he joined anti-apartheid student political organisations including the National Union of South African Students and End Conscription Campaign.

Likewise, as a lawyer he was active in progressive organisations, and he ultimately worked for Lawyers for Human Rights from 1990 to 1994, serving as coordinator of the organisation's capital punishment and penal reform project. During the same period he joined the African National Congress (ANC) and became active in its structures in Pretoria.

== Government service: 1994–2019 ==
=== Parliament: 1994–2009 ===
In South Africa's first post-apartheid elections in April 1994, Nel was elected to represent the ANC in the National Assembly, the lower house of the South African Parliament. He remained in his seat for the next 25 years, gaining re-election in four consecutive general elections. During the first Parliament, from 1994 to 1996, he served in Theme Committee 5 of the Constitutional Assembly, representing the ANC in constitutional negotiations regarding the post-apartheid judiciary. After the June 1999 election, he was appointed as the ANC's whip in the second Parliament's Portfolio Committee on Justice, in which capacity columnist Robert Kirby criticised him as an "odiously smug African National Congress flunky". Alongside his parliamentary positions, Nel was a member of the National Executive Committee of the ANC Youth League from 1996 to 2001, and he was centrally involved in the league's first foray into financial investments in 1997.

In April 2002, he was promoted to Deputy Chief Whip of the Majority Party, and he served in that position until 2008, with a lengthy stint as Acting Chief Whip from 2006 to 2007. During that period, in 2005, he chaired an internal inquiry into the conduct of ANC provincial chairperson Ebrahim Rasool, the report of which was regarded as responsible for Rasool's resignation as Western Cape Premier.

In October 2008, after Kgalema Motlanthe replaced Thabo Mbeki as President of South Africa, the ANC's parliamentary caucus was reshuffled; Bulelani Magwanishe replaced Nel as Deputy Chief Whip, and Nel in turn was appointed to replace Geoff Doidge as house chairperson in the National Assembly. He remained in that position until the April 2009 general election.

=== Deputy Minister of Justice: 2009–2013 ===
After the 2009 election, President Jacob Zuma appointed Nel to deputise Jeff Radebe as Deputy Minister of Justice and Constitutional Development. The Mail & Guardian reported that the Gauteng branch of the ANC had lobbied for Nel's ascension to cabinet in the run-up to the election, feeling that he had "not got the recognition he deserves".

=== Deputy Minister of COGTA: 2013–2019 ===
He served in the Justice Ministry until a reshuffle on 9 July 2013, when Zuma appointed him to replace Yunus Carrim as Deputy Minister of Cooperative Governance and Traditional Affairs (COGTA). A Mail & Guardian editorial speculated that his transfer from the Justice Ministry was not due to his own performance, which had been "solid", but instead was due to Zuma's wish to promote John Jeffery to Nel's former position. A government source told the same newspaper that Nel had been transferred to strengthen the COGTA portfolio with his "eye for detail".

He was reappointed as COGTA deputy minister after the May 2014 general election. At that time, Zuma also appointed a second COGTA minister, Obed Bapela; Bapela was to have responsibility for the traditional affairs portfolio, while Nel would lead the cooperative governance (provincial and local government) side of the ministry. He and Bapela retained their positions throughout Zuma's second term and after Cyril Ramaphosa's midterm election as president. However, Nel did not seek re-election in the May 2019 general election, and he subsequently dropped from Parliament and from the executive, replaced by Parks Tau.

== Luthuli House: 2019–2024 ==
After his departure from Parliament, Nel worked in Luthuli House in the office of ANC Secretary-General Ace Magashule. As coordinator he liaised between the Secretary-General's office and the ANC National Executive Committee. He remained in that position after Magashule was suspended, and indeed he received death threats for his role in implementing the suspension.

During this time, Nel was also the head of an internal ANC team tasked with planning the ANC's response to Zondo Commission's revelations of political corruption. In addition, in July 2022, he was elected to a five-year term as a member of the Central Committee of the South African Communist Party.

== Return to government: 2024–present ==
Ahead of the May 2024 general election, Nel appeared on the ANC's list of parliamentary candidates in an apparent return to frontline politics. During the campaign, opposition party Build One South Africa published a formal apology to Nel after falsely claiming, on a Johannesburg billboard, that the Zondo Commission had implicated Nel in corruption.

He was elected to return to the National Assembly in the election, and he was a member of the ANC's team in the party's subsequent coalition negotiations with the opposition Democratic Alliance. Announcing his third cabinet in June, President Ramaphosa appointed Nel to deputise Thembi Nkadimeng as Deputy Minister of Justice and Constitutional Development.

== Personal life ==
In December 2005, Nel married Kim Robinson, a black woman from Queens, New York. They met in Johannesburg in 1996 while Robinson, a Harvard Law graduate, was clerking for a South African judge.
