= List of ambassadors to Sweden =

This is a list of ambassadors to Sweden. Some ambassadors are accredited to Sweden from other countries, while others reside in Stockholm. The list is based on the diplomatic list published by the Swedish Ministry for Foreign Affairs.

== Current ambassadors to Stockholm ==
Sending country	Presentation of credentials	Location of resident embassy	Ambassador
Afghanistan	2025-01-01	Stockholm, Sweden	Najibullah Mohajer (Chargé d'affaires ad interim)
Albania	2024-03-21	Stockholm, Sweden	Albana Dautllari
Algeria	2023-09-27	Stockholm, Sweden	Seddik Saoudi
Andorra	2020-10-07	Andorra, Andorra	Gil Rossell Duchamps
Angola	2023-09-06	Stockholm, Sweden	Cecilia Caldeira da Conceicao Rosario
Argentina	2020-12-04	Stockholm, Sweden	Maria Clara Biglieri
Armenia	2023-09-27	Stockholm, Sweden	Anna Aghadjanian
Australia	2023-11-09	Stockholm, Sweden	Frances Sagala
Austria	2023-02-22	Stockholm, Sweden	Doris Danler
Azerbaijan	2021-07-01	Stockholm, Sweden	Zaur Ahmadov
Bahamas	2020-01-16	London, United Kingdom	Ellison Edroy Greenslade
Bahrain	2016-10-20	London, United Kingdom	Fawas bin Mohamed bin Khalifa Al Khalifa
Bangladesh	2022-08-24	Stockholm, Sweden	Mehdi Hasan
Belarus	—	Stockholm, Sweden	Yaroslav Martsinkevich (Chargé d'affaires ad interim)
Belgium	2021-08-27	Stockholm, Sweden	Carl Lodewijk A. Peeters
Benin	2015-12-15	Paris, France	Eusébe Agbangla
Bhutan	2024-06-13	Brussels, Belgium	Tshoki Choden
Bolivia	2021-10-29	Stockholm, Sweden	Milton Rene Soto Santiesteban
Bosnia and Herzegovina	2023-12-07	Stockholm, Sweden	Bojan Šošić
Botswana	2023-12-07	Stockholm, Sweden	Juliana Angela Dube-Gobotswang
Brazil	2024-02-15	Stockholm, Sweden	Maria Edileuza Fontenele Reis
Bulgaria	2023-11-09	Stockholm, Sweden	Svetlana Stoycheva-Etropolski
Burundi	2025-04-03	Berlin, Germany	Annonciata Sendazirasa
Cambodia	2025-02-13	London, United Kingdom	Panha Tuot
Canada	2021-10-29	Stockholm, Sweden	Jason Lancelot Alexander Latorre
Chile	2022-08-24	Stockholm, Sweden	Tucapel Francisco Jiménez Fuentes
China	2022-01-11	Stockholm, Sweden	Aimin Cui
Colombia	2023-12-07	Stockholm, Sweden	Guillermo Francisco Reyes Gonzalez
Congo	2024-09-04	Stockholm, Sweden	Nana Rosine Aurelie Ivouba (née Ngangoue)
Costa Rica	2025-02-13	San José, Costa Rica	Alexander Penaranda Zárate
Croatia	2019-01-17	Stockholm, Sweden	Siniša Grgić
Cuba	2021-02-24	Stockholm, Sweden	Alba Beatriz Soto
Cyprus	2022-05-05	Stockholm, Sweden	Solon Savva
Czechia	2021-06-09	Stockholm, Sweden	Anita Grmelová
Denmark	2022-09-30	Stockholm, Sweden	Kristina Miskowiak Beckvard
Dominican Republic	2023-12-07	Stockholm, Sweden	Lourdes Margarita Franco de Zimmermann
Ecuador	2024-06-13	Stockholm, Sweden	Manuel Jose Vivanco Riofrio
Egypt	2021-11-09	Stockholm, Sweden	Ahmed Adel Sobhy Ahmed
Estonia	2022-09-30	Stockholm, Sweden	Toomas Lukk
Finland	2021-09-02	Stockholm, Sweden	Maimo Susanne Henriksson
France	—	Stockholm, Sweden	Diane Doucerain (Chargé d'affaires ad interim)
Germany	2025-10-21	Stockholm, Sweden	Ludger Alexander Siemes
India	—	Stockholm, Sweden	Rakesh Kumar Tiwari (Chargé d'affaires ad interim)
Iran	2024-11-14	Stockholm, Sweden	Hojjatollah Faghani
Ireland	2023-09-06	Stockholm, Sweden	Barbara Jones
Israel	2021-08-27	Stockholm, Sweden	Ziv Nevo Kulman
Italy	2024-02-15	Stockholm, Sweden	Michele Pala
Japan	2024-11-14	Stockholm, Sweden	Hideaki Mizukoshi
Kenya	2024-02-21	Stockholm, Sweden	Angelina Kavindu
Lithuania	2024-02-21	Stockholm, Sweden	Linas Antanas Linkevicius
Malaysia	2024-11-14	Stockholm, Sweden	Sarimah Akbar
Mexico	2023-09-27	Stockholm, Sweden	Alejandro Alday Gonzalez
Netherlands	2024-11-14	Stockholm, Sweden	Theodorus Antonius Reintjes
New Zealand	2023-06-12	Stockholm, Sweden	David Leslie Taylor
Norway	2021-09-02	Stockholm, Sweden	Aud Kolberg
Pakistan	2024-09-04	Stockholm, Sweden	Bilal Hayee
Poland	—	Stockholm, Sweden	Karolina Zyta Ostrzyniewska (Chargé d'affaires ad interim)
Portugal	2020-09-09	Stockholm, Sweden	Sara Feronha Martins
Qatar	2023-09-27	Stockholm, Sweden	Nadya Ahmad A. Al-Sheebi
Romania	2022-08-24	Stockholm, Sweden	Daniel Ionita
Russia	2024-12-05	Stockholm, Sweden	Sergey Belyaev
Saudi Arabia	2021-06-28	Stockholm, Sweden	Enass Ahmad A. Alshahwan
Serbia	2024-02-21	Stockholm, Sweden	Jelena Cukic-Matic
Singapore	2019-11-28	Singapore, Singapore	Andrew Kwan Kok Tiong
South Africa	2024-12-04	Stockholm, Sweden	Zenani Nosizwe Dlamini
Spain	2024-10-16	Stockholm, Sweden	Luis Manuel Cuesta Civis
Sri Lanka	2024-06-13	Stockholm, Sweden	Kapila Thushara Fonseka
Switzerland	2024-10-16	Stockholm, Sweden	Walter Adrian Junker
Thailand	2023-02-22	Stockholm, Sweden	Arunrung Phothong Humphreys
Turkey	2022-08-24	Stockholm, Sweden	Yönet Can Tezel
Ukraine	2020-11-23	Stockholm, Sweden	Andrii Plakhotniuk
United Arab Emirates	2019-09-19	Stockholm, Sweden	Mohammed bin Maktoum bin Rashid Al-Maktoum
United Kingdom	2024-09-04	Stockholm, Sweden	Samantha Louise Job
United States	2025-10-21	Stockholm, Sweden	Christine Jack Toretti
Uzbekistan	2024-12-04	Stockholm, Sweden	Rakhmatulla Nurimbetov
Viet Nam	2023-09-06	Stockholm, Sweden	Van Tuan Tran
Zambia	2023-04-19	Stockholm, Sweden	Neven Gladys Lundwe
Zimbabwe	2021-10-22	Stockholm, Sweden	Priscila Misihairabwi Mushonga

== See also ==
- Foreign relations of Sweden
- List of diplomatic missions of Sweden
- List of diplomatic missions in Sweden
