= John Jeffery (South African politician) =

South African politician (born 1963)

The Honourable John Jeffery MP

Deputy Minister of Justice
- Incumbent
- Assumed office 9 July 2013
- President: Jacob Zuma; Cyril Ramaphosa
- Minister: Jeff Radebe; Michael Masutha; Ronald Lamola
- Preceded by: Andries Nel

Member of the National Assembly
- Incumbent
- Assumed office 1999

Personal details
- Party: African National Congress

John Harold Jeffery (born 31 October 1963) has been the Deputy Minister of Justice and Constitutional Development in South Africa since 2013. He was appointed by President Jacob Zuma in a cabinet reshuffle on 9 July 2013, and has remained in the post throughout the tenure of current President Cyril Ramaphosa.

== Life and career ==
Jeffery was born in Mauritius and grew up in George in South Africa. He has an BA in Political Science and English, an LLB, and a postgraduate diploma in Environmental Law from the University of KwaZulu-Natal. He was active in anti-Apartheid politics, and he practiced briefly as an attorney, including, in the early 1990s, on cases involving political violence in KwaZulu-Natal. He left to pursue his political career in the KwaZulu-Natal provincial legislature, to which he belonged from 1994 to 1999. In South Africa's second democratic elections in 1999, he was elected to the National Assembly on the African National Congress (ANC) list for KwaZulu-Natal. While a Member of Parliament, he served on the Rules Committee and the Portfolio Committee on Justice and Constitutional Development. From 1999 to 2005, he was Parliamentary Counsellor to Deputy President Jacob Zuma, and he was also Parliamentary Counsellor to President Thabo Mbeki and Deputy President Kgalema Motlanthe. He has served on the ANC National Executive Committee.

=== Legislation ===
Jeffrey has been described as a "champion" of the Prevention and Combating of Hate Crimes and Hate Speech Bill. According to the Business Day, as a senior member of the Portfolio Committee on Justice he drove the ANC caucus's efforts to pass the controversial Legal Practice Act, for which he continued to advocate after he was appointed to the Ministry.

== Controversies ==
=== Remark about Lindiwe Mazibuko ===
In a parliamentary debate in June 2013, Jeffrey compared Lindiwe Mazibuko's stature as opposition leader with her "weight," by which many understood him to mean her body weight. According to the Hansard, he said, "The Honourable Mazibuko may be a person of some weight, is she a person of some stature?" Following national media coverage, the ANC issued a statement saying that Jeffery had not intended to comment on Mazibuko's physical appearance, but that he would unconditionally withdraw his remark. He later apologised to Mazibuko in Parliament.

=== Powers of the Public Protector and Nkandla judgement ===
According to the Mail and Guardian, by 2013 Jeffery had "a history of sparring with Public Protector Thuli Madonsela over the extent of her [office's] independence." In 2014 and 2015, while Deputy Minister, he made headlines for arguing that the Nkandla report and other decisions by the Public Protector were not legally binding. In April 2016, he defended President Jacob Zuma in a parliamentary debate on an unsuccessful motion to remove him from office following a Constitutional Court judgement about his non-compliance with the Public Protector's report. Jeffery reportedly said that, while the judgement found that the President's conduct had been inconsistent with the Constitution, it did not find that Zuma had committed a "serious violation." He also reportedly said that even the incumbent Public Protector, Thuli Madonsela, was unsure about the extent of the office's powers, leading Madonsela to respond on Twitter. In 2015, she claimed that Jeffery had initiated efforts to shrink the Office of the Public Protector, which he denied.

In 2017, Jeffery received further media attention for defending replacements Zuma had made at the Judicial Service Commission, which recommends judicial appointments. Jeffery argued, as he already had in 2014, against the view that Zuma was undermining the independence of the judiciary.
