= Gratitude Magwanishe =

South African politician

Chairperson of the Portfolio Committee on Justice and Constitutional Development
- In office 2 July 2019 – 29 May 2024
- Preceded by: Refiloe Mothapo
- Succeeded by: Xola Nqola

Member of the National Assembly
- In office 14 June 1999 – 29 May 2024

Deputy Minister of Trade and Industry
- In office 31 March 2017 – 7 May 2019
- President: Jacob Zuma; Cyril Ramaphosa
- Minister: Rob Davies
- Preceded by: Mzwandile Masina
- Succeeded by: Fikile Majola; Nomalungelo Gina

Deputy Minister of Public Enterprises
- In office 13 June 2012 – 30 March 2017
- President: Jacob Zuma
- Minister: Malusi Gigaba; Lynne Brown
- Preceded by: Ben Martins
- Succeeded by: Ben Martins

Personal details
- Born: Gratitude Bulelani Magwanishe; 20 January 1973 (age 53) Johannesburg, South Africa
- Party: African National Congress
- Education: Regent Business School

Gratitude Bulelani Magwanishe (born 20 January 1973) is a South African politician who served in the National Assembly from June 1999 to May 2024. A member of the African National Congress, he also served in the national government as a deputy minister from June 2012 to May 2019.

Elected to the National Assembly in the June 1999 general election, Magwanishe was the Deputy Chief Whip of the Majority Party between October 2008 and June 2012. Thereafter he was appointed by President Jacob Zuma as Deputy Minister of Public Enterprises in June 2012 and as Deputy Minister of Trade and Industry in March 2017. In his final legislative term, he was the chairperson of the Portfolio Committee on Justice and Correctional Services during the Sixth Parliament from 2019 to 2024.

== Early life and education ==
Magwanishe was born on 20 January 1973 in Johannesburg. He became politically active in the student anti-apartheid movement, including as chairperson of the Tsakane Youth Congress. He also represented the congress at the 1989 Conference for a Democratic Future. Later he joined the African National Congress (ANC) Youth League, holding various local and regional leadership positions in the league between 1991 and 2004.

Magwanishe completed an MBA at Regent Business School in 2006. He also holds an LLB from the University of Essex, LLMs from the University of Cumbria and London Metropolitan University, and MScs from Salford Business School and Liverpool John Moores University.

== Political career ==
=== Early parliamentary career: 1999–2012 ===
Magwanishe joined the National Assembly of South Africa in the June 1999 general election and served five consecutive terms in his seat. Initially elected to represent the ANC in the Gauteng constituency, he was elected to some later terms from the ANC's national party list. During his first decade in Parliament, he served as a member and whip in various legislative committees, including the ad hoc committee established to oversee the disbanding of the Scorpions in 2008. He also remained active in his local ANC branch in Ekurhuleni, Gauteng.

In October 2008, Magwanishe was named as the new Deputy Chief Whip of the Majority Party. He held that office until June 2012, deputising Mnyamezeli Booi and, from 2009, Mathole Motshekga; there were reports, denied by the ANC, that he and Motshekga had a tense relationship.

=== National executive: 2012–2019 ===
On 12 June 2012, President Jacob Zuma announced that Magwanishe had been appointed as Deputy Minister of Public Enterprises in a cabinet reshuffle. Sworn in on 13 June, he succeeded Ben Martins, who had been promoted to a ministerial position, and deputised Malusi Gigaba. After the May 2014 general election he was retained in the same portfolio under new minister Lynne Brown. During this period the Department of Public Enterprises was a locus of controversy because of its alleged role in the so-called capture of state-owned enterprises like Denel and Eskom.

In another cabinet reshuffle just after midnight on 30 March 2017, President Zuma transferred Magwanishe to the position of Deputy Minister of Trade and Industry, deputising Rob Davies. He served a little over two years in that portfolio.

=== Justice committee: 2019–2024 ===
Magwanishe was not reappointed to his deputy ministerial position after the May 2019 general election. Instead, the ANC announced that it would nominate him to chair the National Assembly's Portfolio Committee on Justice and Correctional Services, a position to which he was duly elected on 2 July 2019. He also represented the National Assembly as a member of the Judicial Service Commission.

His tenure in the justice portfolio was generally viewed as successful, with the Mail & Guardian reporting that he "won praise for forging cooperation across party lines and seeking to effect thorough oversight" over the justice ministry under Ronald Lamola. He did not return to Parliament after the May 2024 general election.
