= Ioniță =

Ioniță is a Romanian surname and given name. Notable people with the name include:

- Alexandru Ioniță (footballer, born 1989), Romanian footballer
- Alexandru Ioniță (footballer, born 1994), Romanian footballer
- Anamaria Ioniță (born 1988), Romanian athlete
- Andrei Ioniță (born 1994), Romanian cellist
- Artur Ioniță (born 1990), Moldovan footballer
- Costi Ioniță (born 1978), Romanian singer, songwriter and record producer
- Daniel Ioniță, several people
- Ion Ioniță (ice hockey) (born 1951), Romanian ice hockey player
- Ioniță Cuza (ca. 1715–1778), Moldavian statesman and political conspirator
- Ioniță Sandu Sturdza (or Ioan Sturdza; 1762–1842), a Prince of Moldavia
- Raluca Ioniță (born 1976), Romanian sprint canoer
- Ioniță Tunsu (c. 1800–1832), Wallachian hajduk
- Veaceslav Ioniță (born 1973), Moldovan economist and politician
- Victor Ioniță (born 1983), Romanian tennis player

== Other uses ==
- Pârâul Ioniță, a tributary of the river Dornișoara in Romania
- USS Ionita (SP-388), a yacht acquired by the U.S. Navy during World War I
