= Johnny de Lange =

South African politician (born 1958)

Member of the National Assembly
- In office 9 May 1994 – 6 May 2014

Deputy Minister of Justice and Constitutional Development
- In office 29 April 2004 – 10 May 2009
- President: Thabo Mbeki; Kgalema Motlanthe
- Minister: Brigitte Mabandla; Enver Surty
- Succeeded by: Andries Nel

Personal details
- Born: Johannes Hendrik de Lange; 15 January 1958 (age 68) Eshowe, Natal; Union of South Africa
- Party: African National Congress
- Education: Stellenbosch University; University of Cape Town

Johannes Hendrik "Johnny" de Lange (born 15 January 1958) is a South African politician and lawyer who represented the African National Congress (ANC) in the National Assembly from 1994 to 2014. He served as Deputy Minister of Justice and Constitutional Development from 2004 to 2009 and before that, he chaired the Portfolio Committee on Justice from 1994 to 2004.

De Lange is a former anti-apartheid activist and an advocate of the Cape High Court. He left Parliament after the 2014 general election, in which he failed to gain re-election to his seat.

== Early life and activism ==
De Lange was born on 15 January 1958 in Eshowe in the former Natal province. His family was Afrikaans and he matriculated at the Afrikaans-medium Hoërskool Port Natal in 1975. He completed a BA at Stellenbosch University in 1978 and an LLB at the University of Cape Town in 1983, completing his mandatory national military service in the interim. From 1985 to 1993, he practiced as an admitted advocate of the Cape Bar.

According to the Mail & Guardian, de Lange made his early political connections while an advocate in the mid- and late 1980s, representing anti-apartheid activists in the Cape Town area, among them Tony Yengeni and Ashley Forbes. He was a founding member of the National Association of Democratic Lawyers (NADEL) in 1986 and was treasurer of the United Democratic Front in the Western Cape from 1988 to 1990. He joined the African National Congress (ANC) in the Western Cape after it was unbanned in 1990. From 1993 to 1994, while working full-time as director of NADEL's research and training unit, he was also a member of the ANC's delegation to the Multi-Party Negotiating Forum that ended apartheid.

== Post-apartheid political career ==
=== Justice Committee Chair: 1994–2004 ===
In the 1994 general election, South Africa's first under universal suffrage, de Lange was elected to represent the ANC in the National Assembly, and he became the long-serving chairperson of the assembly's Portfolio Committee on Justice. In addition, from 1994 to 1996, he was one of the ANC's negotiators at, and a member of the steering committee of, the Constitutional Assembly that drafted and adopted the post-apartheid Constitution.

As chair of the justice committee, de Lange was known "as a bull in a china shop" and for what the Mail & Guardian called "his robust comments". While he was acknowledged as the driving legislative force behind post-apartheid justice reforms, his comments in parliamentary meetings brought him into conflict with, among others, the presiding officers of Parliament, judicial officers, and George Bizos. In 1998, he was suspended from Parliament for one day after a physical fight with opposition MP Manie Schoeman.

=== Deputy Justice Minister: 2004–2009 ===
After the 2004 general election, President Thabo Mbeki appointed de Lange as Deputy Minister of Justice and Constitutional Development, in which capacity he deputised Brigitte Mabandla. In 2008, while still in that office, he was appointed by Mbeki to conduct a comprehensive review of the criminal justice system, and he was subsequently appointed to coordinate the implementation of the ambitious seven-point modernisation plan that emerged from the review. He was particularly well known for spearheading judicial reform. After de Lange left the justice ministry in 2009, the Mail & Guardian said that many had assumed that he, rather than the Minister, was "the main man" in the ministry.

=== Later positions ===
Pursuant to the 2009 general election, de Lange was re-elected to Parliament, but newly elected President Jacob Zuma appointed Andries Nel to replace him as deputy minister. De Lange remained in Parliament as a backbencher until November 2010, when the ANC nominated him to chair the Portfolio Committee on Water and Environmental Affairs.

In the 2014 general election, de Lange stood for re-election to his legislative seat, but he was ranked 15th on the ANC's provincial-to-national party list in the Western Cape and did not secure a seat. In March 2022, the ANC appointed him to replace Nomvula Mokonyane as the chair of the party's internal National Disciplinary Committee of Appeal; he was reappointed to the same office in 2023 after the party's 55th National Conference.
