= Gumani Mukwevho =

South African politician

Gumani Tania Mukwevho

Member of the National Assembly of South Africa
- In office 25 August 2021 – 19 November 2021
- Preceded by: Joyce Maluleke
- Succeeded by: Refiloe Mothapo
- Constituency: Limpopo

Personal details
- Born: Gumani Tania Mukwevho
- Party: African National Congress
- Occupation: Member of Parliament
- Profession: Politician

Gumani Tania Mukwevho is a South African politician who was a Member of the National Assembly of South Africa from August to November 2021. Mukwevho is a member of the African National Congress.

== Political career ==
Mukwevho is a member of the African National Congress. She was placed sixteenth on the ANC's list of candidates from Limpopo for the National Assembly in 2019, but was not elected due to her low ranking on the list.

In April 2021, Mukwevho was one of 35 people who were appointed by the National Executive Committee of the African National Congress to serve on the African National Congress Youth League National Youth Task Team to try and revive the youth league. The ANC disbanded the youth league in 2018 after it failed to elect new leadership amid infighting.

== Parliamentary career ==
Following the death of Limpopo ANC MP Joyce Maluleke in July 2021, the ANC selected Mukwevho to take up her seat in the National Assembly since she was the next person on the ANC's candidate list. She was sworn in on 25 August. On 27 August, she became a member of the Portfolio Committee on Public Service and Administration, Performance Monitoring & Evaluation and the Portfolio Committee on Women, Youth and People with Disabilities.

On 19 November 2021, she resigned from the National Assembly as she was the ANC's mayoral candidate for the Makhado Local Municipality. ANC infighting and divisions resulted in incumbent mayor Samuel Munyai being re-elected.
