= FeesMustFall =

2015–2016 student movement in South Africa

#FeesMustFall
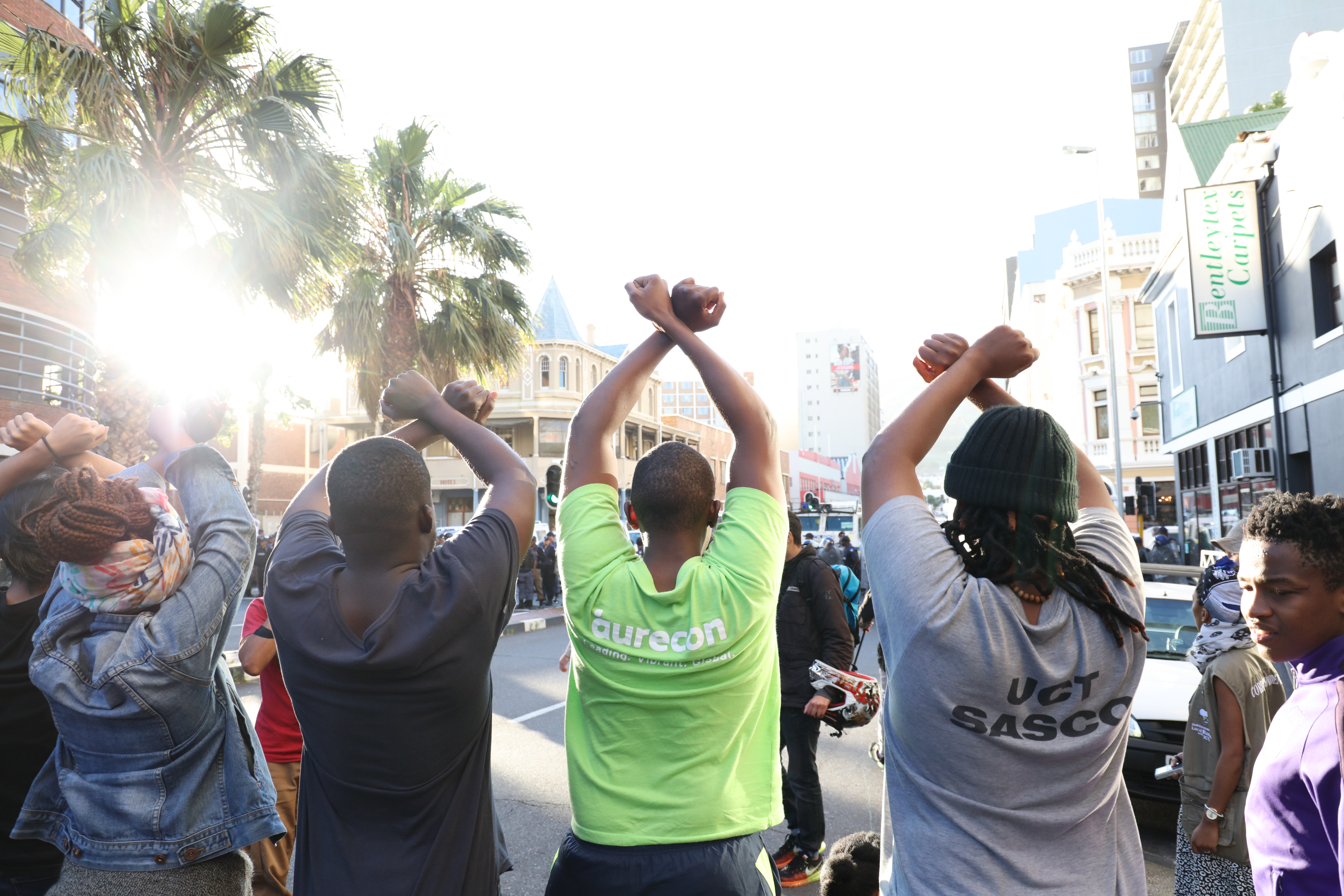
- A group of students raise their hands in the air to signal that they have come in peace.
- Date: 12 October 2015 – October 2016
- Location: South Africa
- Caused by: An increase in fees by South African universities
- Methods: Protest
- Result: No university fee increases in 2016; Over R 800 million in property damage (roughly equivalent to US$59 million); Increased government funding for universities

Casualties
- Deaths: 1
- Arrested: 619

#FeesMustFall was a student-led protest movement that began in mid-October 2015 in South Africa. The goals of the movement were to stop increases in student fees as well as to increase government funding of universities. Protests started at the University of Witwatersrand and spread to the University of Cape Town and Rhodes University before rapidly spreading to other universities across the country. Although initially enjoying significant public support the protest movement started to lose public sympathy when the protests started turning violent.

The 2015 protest ended when it was announced by the South African government that there would be no tuition fee increases for 2016. The protest in 2016 began when the South African Minister of Higher Education announced that there would be fee increases capped at 8% for 2017; however, each institution was given the freedom to decide by how much their tuition would increase. By October 2016, the Department of Education estimated that the total cost in property damage due to the protest since 2015 had amounted to R600 million (equivalent to US$44.25 million).

== Background ==
The protests followed a three-day student lockdown of the University of the Witwatersrand campus the week before following an announcement by the university that fees would be increasing by 10.5% in the following year despite an inflation rate of only around 6% for the same year. The university's chief financial officer stated that the cause of the high increase in fees was:

# The rand-dollar exchange rate has fallen by approximately 22%, which has resulted in a substantial increase in the amount of money that we pay for all library books, journals, electronic resources, research equipment that are procured in dollars and euros.

1. Salary increases for academics are set at 7% based on a three-year cycle and these increases are necessary to ensure that we retain the best intellectual minds in the country.
2. Generic inflation is hovering at around 6% which impacts on all other expenses that the University has to cover.
3. Utilities are increasing at rates substantially higher than the inflation rate.

Although the focus of the protests was focused on a rise in fees a number of factors formed the background for the protests from a lack of funding for poorer students to attend university, high incomes for university managers, a real decline in government funding for higher education, lack of social transformation, to broader socio-economic and racial inequality issues.

The vice chancellor of the University of the Witwatersrand Adam Habib estimated that if government could provide an extra R8 billion per year "that will cover the tuition fees of every student at every university in the country." South Africa spends 0.75% of its GDP on tertiary education which is less than the African or world average.

The movements were started and led by the SRC leader of the University of the Witwatersrand of 2015, Shaeera Kalla. On 2 October Kalla attended her last council meeting as SRC president, she is accompanied by incoming SRC president-elect, Nompendulo Mkhatshwa.

== Timeline 2015 ==
=== 12–19 October ===
Students at the University of Witwatersrand started protesting on 14 October 2015 in response to an announcement by the university that fees would be raised by 10.5%. This led to a sit in and lock down of the university by students and some staff that, on 17 October, resulted in the university agreeing to suspend the fee increase and renegotiate it as well as not seek disciplinary action against participating students or staff members.

On Sunday 18 October messages started circulating on Facebook about a possible complete shut down of the Rhodes University campus.

=== 19 October ===
By Monday 19 October fresh negotiations between students and the university had begun. On the same day similar protests had spread to the University of Cape Town and Rhodes University. On the same day management at the University of Cape Town -which had announced a 10.3% fee increase the week before- applied for and received a court interdict to prevent protests at the university. Students started blocking vehicle access by placing rocks, dustbins, and benches on the roads leading into the campus.

Students went ahead and led by the Rhodes Must Fall movement occupied the university's administration building. Riot police were called to forcibly evict the protesters with over 25 students being arrested late at night. Reportedly over a thousand students then gathered at the Rondebosch police station and held an all night vigil calling for the students' release.

At Rhodes University students reportedly started barricading themselves into the university and forcibly turning away others from entering the campus. Students at the University of Pretoria reportedly initiated plans to lock down three of that university's campuses for Wednesday 21 October.

=== 20 October ===
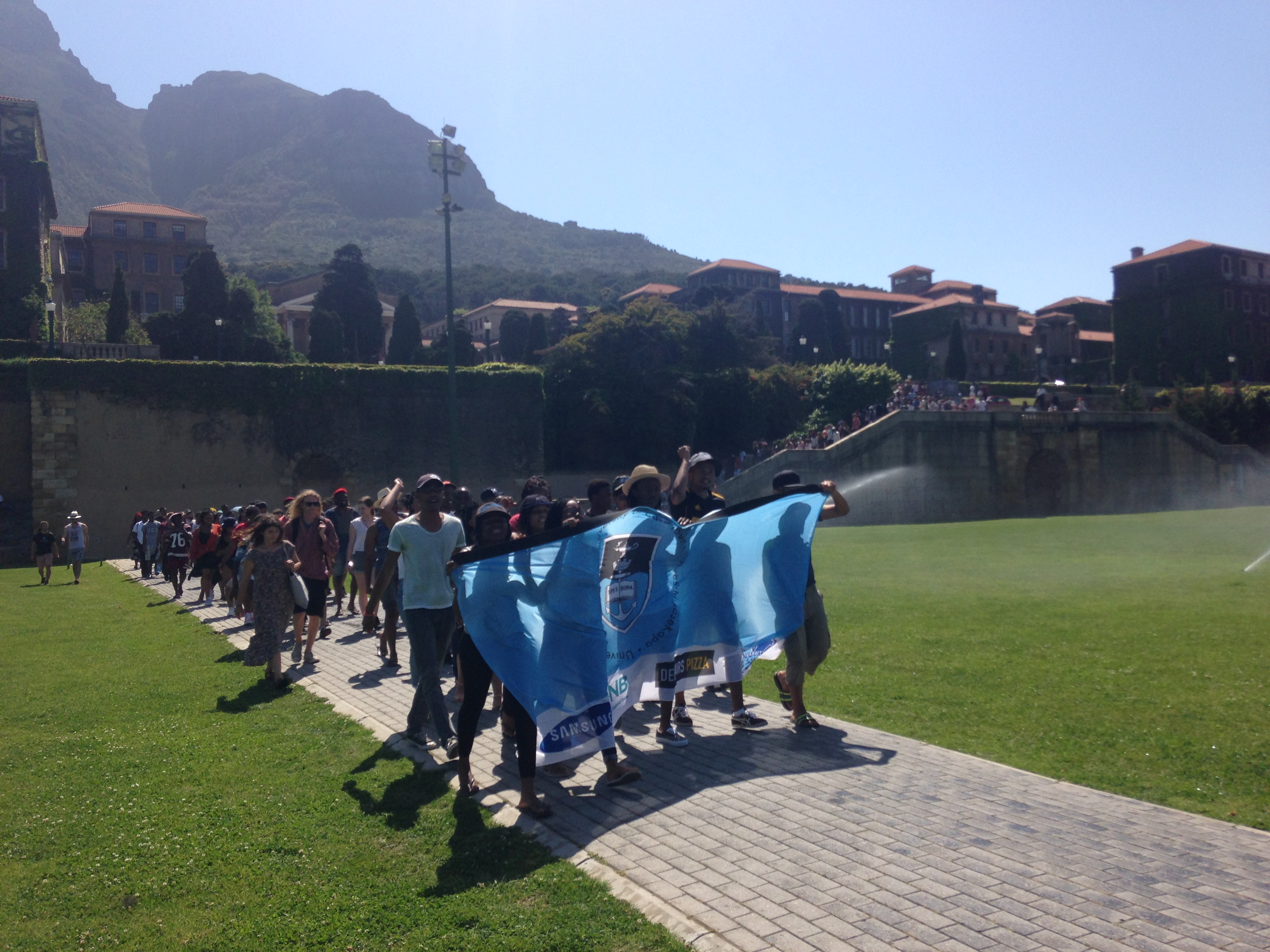
Students from the University of Cape Town marching to the local police station on Tuesday 20 October 2015 to demand the release of other students arrested the night before.

On Tuesday 20 October students assembled at the University of Cape Town and marched down to the local police station to demand that the students that were arrested the previous night be released. The Cape Peninsula University of Technology students started protesting and locked down the campus. At the Fort Hare University students also began protests and a campus lock down. They refused to disperse or write exams until university management had dealt with concerns over fee increases and issues of corruption. Students at the University of Stellenbosch handed over a memorandum of grievances to university management outlining their complaints whilst students at Rhodes University continued their protests. At the University of Witwatersrand students rejected a proposed compromise by the university to cap fee increases at 6% and instead demanded that there be no increase in fees.

=== 21 October ===
Protests at Parliament – 21 October

A video of the exact moment the #FeesMustFall protesters on entered the gates of the South African Parliament.

One of the protesters who entered the parliamentary grounds being manhandled by police as he is arrested.

Demonstrators at the #FeesMustFall protest on 21 October 2015 outside the South African parliament in Cape Town, standing and singing the national anthem with their hands in the air and being dispersed by riot police.

On Wednesday 21 October 2015 students from both the University of Cape Town as well as the Cape Peninsula University of Technology formed a crowd of around 5,000 protesters marched on the South African Parliament which coincided with the meeting of the National Assembly -with both Higher Education Minister Blade Nzimande and President Jacob Zuma in attendance- which was in session to hear the medium-term budget. Following the finance minister's address, Nzimande tried to address the crowd but was repeatedly booed by the crowd whilst President Zuma left the Parliamentary buildings from a side entrance. Other parliamentarians were advised by the speaker of the house to wait out the protests in their offices.

Protesters broke through the gates of the parliamentary precinct and began to stage a sit-in protest, but riot police soon moved in to disperse them using stun grenades, tasers, coloured gas, riot shields and truncheons. After the riot police had cleared the precinct of protesters and shut the gates, police warned protesters that they were contravening the National Key Points Act and that if they do not disperse with in 15 minutes, they will be arrested. The protesters did not leave, and police went ahead and arrested a number of them. It was claimed that protesters identified by police as particular troublemakers were arrested. The presence of riot police was questioned by the press.

Mass meetings at Stellenbosch University were held on the same day to demonstrate against fee increases.

Protest action also started at Nelson Mandela Metropolitan University in Port Elizabeth, when students blocked the main roads onto the Summerstrand campuses. At least one altercation with the police took place when tear gas and rubber bullets were used to push students back onto campus.

=== 22 October ===
The University of Johannesburg experienced protests, during which an altercation between students and private security guards took place. Students at Fort Hare University lit bonfires at the university's entrance and vandalised the campus security offices. In Johannesburg students marched on the ruling African National Congress's (ANC) headquarters at Luthuli House where students handed over a memorandum to ANC secretary general Gwede Mantashe. Protests continued in Cape Town with students gathering at the central magistrates court to witness the court appearance of the 29 students arrested during protests outside Parliament the day before.

Despite assurances by NMMU management that classes would resume on 22 October 2015, protesters continued action. This included disruption of some classes that staff and students attempted to attend. A meeting was due to take place at a stadium on campus, but this was not attended by students, partly due to rumors on social media that there was a heavy police presence at the stadium. Students then insisted that Vice-Chancellor meet them where they had gathered, which he refused to do, citing safety concerns of a large number of people at that location. Following the meeting, students moved to block vehicle access to campus, which lasted until approximately 18:00, trapping some staff and students on campus.

=== 23 October ===
In the United Kingdom a group of around 200 students gathered at Trafalgar Square in front of South Africa House to show support of protesting students in South Africa. A Cape Town daily newspaper, the Cape Argus, invited student co-editors to edit the day's edition of the newspaper. Articles were written, commissioned and edited by the students involved in the #FeesMustFall protest.

Classes at NMMU were cancelled, and student protesters continued blocking entrances to campus. This was followed by a peaceful movement to another campus (2nd Avenue).

During the morning university vice chancellors and student representatives met with President Jacob Zuma in Pretoria to negotiate a way forward. Whilst they were meeting, a large group of protesting students assembled outside the Union Buildings to await Zuma's response. A small group turned violent, setting fire to a portable toilet and breaking down fences. The police responded with tear gas, stun grenades, and rubber bullets. The students themselves called for discipline, stressing it was a peaceful protest.

Shortly after 3 pm, President Zuma announced from within the Union Buildings that there would be no increase in university fees in 2016. Whilst this was a major victory for the protest, protesters were upset that the president chose not to address them directly. A number of students tried to storm the Union Buildings demanding to address Zuma. Police responded with force, using rubber bullets. After being driven out of the Union Buildings, students continued to protest in the streets.

One consequence of the #FeesMustFall movement was the establishment of a Commission of Inquiry into Higher Education and Training. President Jacob Zuma launched the commission's probe in January 2016, the reported goal being to report on the feasibility of providing free tertiary education.

== Costs ==
The South African Department of Higher Education and Training calculated the damage caused to universities during the 2015 #FeesMustFall protests to R300 302 848.58, with the North West University's Mahikeng campus having suffered the most damage at R151m due to unrest that saw buildings torched, students shot at with rubber bullets and the university closing for a month.

== 2016 Revival and #FeesMustFall2016 ==
In mid-August 2016, the Minister of Higher Education and Training was widely expected to announce fee structures for the 2017 academic year. This led to a revival of the fees must fall campaign under the hashtag #FeesMustFall2016.

=== August ===
==== 10 August ====
Led by Honourable Justice Jonathan Heher, a former judge of the Supreme Court of Appeal, the Fees Commission began set 1 of the hearings. It included submissions and testimonies from student representatives and unions.

==== 12 August ====
The Council on Higher Education concluded that a 0% fee increase would be unsustainable and recommended an inflation-related increase for South Africa's universities in 2017.

==== 14 August ====
Calls were made on social media for students to shut down universities on 15 August. These purportedly came from the South African Union of Students.

Later in the day Minister for Higher Education, Blade Nzimande called for calm stating that no decision had (yet) been reached about fees. Meanwhile, ANC secretary general Gwede Mantashe reaffirmed the National Executive Committee's prevailing policy of no fee increases at South African universities.

==== 15 August ====
Protests at the University of KwaZulu-Natal and Mangosuthu University of Technology over the purported fee increases lead to the suspension of the academic programmes at those universities. Police were deployed to some other universities in anticipation of protests. Blade Nzimande reiterated that no decision had been reached over fees for 2017.

==== 20 August ====
Protests broke out at Walter Sisulu University's Ibika campus in Butterworth and Nelson Mandela Drive campus in Mthatha. Hundreds of students blocked the N2 in both towns and are reported to have thrown stones at vehicles. Police in Mthatha responded with teargas and several students were arrested in Butterworth.

South African president Jacob Zuma instructs Finance Minister Pravin Gordhan to "find the money" to ensure a 0% increase in 2017. This came despite National Treasury's warning that this was unaffordable and Nzimande's earlier position that universities needed at least a 6% increase to avoid "collapse". The students conducted a feasibility study with an independent source and it was found that R60 Billion was lost in corruption annually and that free education at the same standard as it is paid (facilities, lectures etc.) would only cost R45 Billion annually.

==== 23 August ====
During protests at the University of Witwatersrand a cleaner died as the result of an apparent asthma attack. A fire extinguisher was released in Jubilee Hall at the university campus. The cleaner was taken to hospital and discharged and treated. After discharge from hospital the worker died.

==== 25 August ====
Pravin Gordhan is reported as saying that if corruption could be addressed, South Africa could afford to cover university fees for students from poor backgrounds. This came shortly after outgoing rector of the University of the Free State, Jonathan Jansen told a press conference that he believed that there was no hope for South African universities.

=== September ===
==== 6 September ====
A group of students disrupted the Fees commission hearing and blocked University of Cape Town (UCT) vice-chancellor Max Price from leaving the venue. Protestors at the University of KwaZulu-Natal burn the Law Library at Howard College in Durban, including some rare early texts in Roman-Dutch law.

==== 19 September ====
The University of Cape Town suspended its academic project in anticipation of an announcement on the fees situation by Minister Nzimande.

At 11AM Blade Nzimande announced that university fees would increase in 2017, but increases would be capped at 8%. He emphasized that university councils would make the final decisions about fees. However he went on to say that the government was still engaging with stakeholders to come up with a way to provide financial assistance to students with annual family incomes of below R600,000.

As an immediate response, students at the University of Witwatersrand mobilised to shut down their campus, blockading entrances. The protesters claimed that all protest would be peaceful; however, they turned to violence when vehemently denied entrance to the Great Hall by heavily armed riot police. Concrete objects were destroyed and pieces were thrown at security guards who were defending the hall. The students were demanding "free decolonized education for black people". This was purportedly followed by students at University of the Free State and University of Pretoria.

=== October ===
On 10 October students at the University of Witwatersrand gathered at the Great Hall, an area on the campus. The students were denied access to the hall by private security. They were soon replaced by the South African Police Force. In order to disperse the protesters the police fired rubber bullets, stun grenades and smoke grenades. 2 students were injured and 11 were arrested by police (recorded at approximately 11:00). By the afternoon the students started throwing rocks. One bus was allegedly burnt by students, but no proof was found. Students at the University of Pretoria picked up rocks and put them in bins as a sign of peace.

On 19 October two security guards were allegedly attacked on the University of Cape Town campus during a protest with video evidence published by a number of news sites. The guards were allegedly beaten with steel rods taped with masking tape and also beaten with their own batons while in another alleged incident a rock was allegedly dropped on a security guard's head, resulting in hospitalization of the security guard. On 25 October vehicles were set on fire by allegedly by protesters at the University of Cape Town. Later that year protestors disrupted the University of Cape Town's Convocation Annual General Meeting during which campus food stall owners alleged that Fees Must Fall protestors had threatened them with violence during the protests.

=== Reactions ===
The 2016 protests saw the movement lose momentum, due to alleged sabotage by the PYA (an alliance of the leading party, the ANC) and internal divisions. In response to the protests the South African government increased the amount budgeted for higher education by R17-billion over 3 years and stated that government subsidies to universities would increase by 10.9% a year. The protests also increased the use of blended learning by South African universities to assist non-protesting students complete their courses. On 7 December the University of the Witwatersrand announced that it would be increasing student fees by 8%.

== Police action ==
Police used stun grenades, rubber bullets, teargas and water cannons to disperse students on the East side of the campus. While students remained calm, three days into the 2016 protest, students reacted to the police action and started throwing rocks at the police. Arthur Muhamelwa who was part of the logistics team behind the movement was one of those targeted by police in 2016 where they drove him around for hours interrogating him about the movement and the whereabouts of other student leaders such as Shaeera Kalla, Mcebo Dlamini, Koena Ramogayana and Fasiha Hassan. #FeesMustFall leaders (in both 2015 and 2016) were all shot with rubber bullets and in particular the outgoing SRC president of 2015, Shaeera Kalla, was shot 9 times with rubber bullets at close range when she turned her back on police at the forefront of protests last year. During this heightened period of brutality against students, the police denied these allegations of targeting student leaders. South African Police Spokesperson stated that police were reminded to "exercise maximum restraint and act within the limits of the law."

On 18 October 2016, it was said by students demonstrating at the University of Witwatersrand, that police officers were targeting leaders to weaken the movement. There are alleged claims of students being abducted, abused and then dumped into Limpopo. Wits student Arthur Muhamelwa was arrested by police on Sunday, who proceeded to abduct him. Police drove him around for hours, whilst student leaders looked for him at Hillbrow, Jeppe and Cleveland police stations. the Student representative (SRC) council started #WhereIsArthur on Facebook. Arthur realised he was in some danger, he typed in an SMS seen by Daily Maverick, "Something here is not right, i'm still on a moving police quantum passing a board written Bela Bela and Polokwane and a board written welcome to Limpopo." this was just before 20:00 on Sunday evening. the Police proceeded to strip Arthur naked as well as torture him. he was then abandoned by the police Near a river in Thohoyandou, Limpopo. This and many other allegations were made by students and student leaders, who were adamant that the police was targeting leaders and intimidating them to quiet down protests. The Police force denied all allegations.

Brutality was a big topic for debate since the general public either claimed the students were to blame due to their unprovoked violence, therefore giving police authority to use force, or the police were to blame, apparently using force while being unprovoked by students, resulting in student violence and destruction.

== Student violence ==
Alleged incidents of student violence against security guards were recorded during the protests, with security guards allegedly beaten and an incident occurring where a rock was allegedly thrown by a student at a security guard's head, resulting in hospitalization.

A worker at the University of Witwatersrand died during the protests due to an apparent asthma attack as a result of a fire extinguisher being set off on campus.

Cases of intimidation of staff and non-participating students during the protest movement were recorded.

== Legacy ==
The initial impact of the protests was to prevent any raise in university tuition in 2016. The protests resulted in the guarantee by national government of free higher education for students leading to the creation in 2018 of a national bursary scheme for poor and working class students totalling R12.4-billion in 2018 with the bursary budget expected to increase to R24.3-billion in 2020. A study by the Centre for the Study of Violence and Reconciliation concluded that the decolonisation focus of the 2016 protests was less successful than the 2015 protests; however the study concludes that the protests did bring the subject of decolonisation of educational institutions and the alienation of black students and staff from university life to broader public attention.

The protests were estimated to have cost around R800 million in damages to educational infrastructure. Family members of University of Cape Town Professor Bongani Mayosi stated that the "vitriolic character of student engagements" during the protests by protesting students led to the decline in Mayosi's mental health resulting in his suicide in 2018.

The movement along with #Rhodesmustfall has been criticised by the Institute of Race Relations for eroding freedom of speech in South African universities by promoting intolerance of alternative points of view, with pro-FeesMustFall activists taking actions ranging from shouting down non-supporters to acts of intimidation and violence.

A number of people involved in the #feesmustfall protests (most notably Naledi Chirwa, Vuyani Pambo, Peter Keetse and Dali Mpofu) were registered as Economic Freedom Fighters party representatives for the 2019 South African general election.

The 2019 film Everything Must Fall documents the 2016 FeesMustFall protests.

== See also ==
- FeesMustFall activists
