= Joyce Maluleke =

South African politician (1961–2021)

Boitumelo Joyce Maluleke

Member of the National Assembly of South Africa
- In office 23 June 2015 – 16 July 2021
- Preceded by: Polly Boshielo
- Succeeded by: Gumani Mukwevho
- Constituency: Limpopo

Personal details
- Born: 25 April 1961
- Died: 16 July 2021 (aged 60)
- Party: African National Congress (Until 2021)
- Profession: Politician

Boitumelo Joyce Maluleke (25 April 1961 – 16 July 2021) was a South African politician. She served as a Member of the National Assembly of South Africa from 2015 until her death from COVID-19 related complications in 2021. Maluleke was a member of the African National Congress.

== Political career ==
Maluleke had been an African National Congress member of the Limpopo Provincial Legislature. She served as chairperson of the education committee. She was ranked 17th on the ANC's regional to national list prior to the 2014 parliamentary election. The ANC won only 16 regional seats in the province, declining Maluleke a seat in the National Assembly. She did not return to the provincial legislature.

In 2015, Polly Boshielo resigned from the National Assembly. The ANC chose Maluleke to take up her seat since she was next on the list. She was then named to the Portfolio Committee on Cooperative Governance and Traditional Affairs. In 2018, she became a member of the Ad Hoc Committee on the Filling of Vacancies in the Commission for Gender Equality.

Maluleke was thirteenth on the ANC's regional list for the parliamentary election on May 8, 2019. She was elected to a full term in parliament in the election. In June, she was named to the Portfolio Committee on Public Service and Administration, Performance Monitoring & Evaluation and the Portfolio Committee on Women, Youth and People with Disabilities. Maluleke became a member of the committee on the Powers and Privileges of Parliament in September 2019.

== Death ==
Maluleke died from COVID-19 related complications on 16 July 2021. Her husband also succumbed to COVID-19-related complications the following day.

== See also ==
- List of members of the National Assembly of South Africa who died in office
