= Refiloe Mothapo =

South African politician

Member of the National Assembly of South Africa
- In office 7 December 2021 – 28 May 2024
- Preceded by: Gumani Mukwevho
- Constituency: Limpopo
- In office 21 May 2014 – 7 May 2019
- Constituency: Limpopo

Chairperson of the Portfolio Committee on Justice and Correctional Services
- In office 9 October 2018 – 7 May 2019
- Preceded by: Mathole Motshekga
- Succeeded by: Gratitude Magwanishe

Personal details
- Born: Madipoane Refiloe Moremadi Mothapo
- Party: African National Congress

Madipoane Refiloe Moremadi Mothapo is a South African politician served as a Member of the National Assembly of South Africa for the African National Congress from 2014 until 2019 and again from 2021 until 2024.

== Parliamentary career ==
In 2014, Mothapo was elected to the National Assembly of South Africa from the ANC's Limpopo list. She was appointed to serve on the Portfolio Committee on Justice and Correctional Services. On 8 March 2015, she became a member of the Constitutional Review Committee.

On 17 May 2018, she was elected as an ANC Party Whip. Mothapo became the whip of the ANC's Study Group on Justice and Correctional Services on 30 May 2018. Mothapo was elected to chair the Portfolio Committee on Justice and Correctional Services on 9 October 2018. As chair of the Justice and Correctional Services portfolio committee, the portfolio committee rejected a request by the opposition Democratic Alliance (DA) to expedite procedures to remove Public Protector Busisiwe Mkhwebane from office as a similar process was instituted by the DA in the North Gauteng High Court and the committee believed that it was premature to run a parallel process.

Mothapo was 17th on the ANC's list of parliamentary candidates from Limpopo for the 2019 general election. At the election, she lost her seat.

Following the resignation of ANC MP Gumani Mukwevho, the ANC selected Mothapo to take up her seat in the assembly. She was sworn in on 7 December 2021. As of February 2022, she serves on the Portfolio Committee on Defence and Military Veterans and the Joint Standing Committee on Defence.

Mothapo was not an ANC parliamentary candidate in the 2024 general election and left parliament.
