= Xola Nqola =

South African politician (born 1986)

The Honourable Xola Nqola MP

Member of the National Assembly
- Incumbent
- Assumed office 22 May 2019
- Constituency: Eastern Cape (2019–2024)

Chairperson of the Portfolio Committee on Justice and Constitutional Development
- Incumbent
- Assumed office 9 July 2024
- Preceded by: Bulelani Magwanishe

Chairperson of the Joint Constitutional Review Committee
- In office 7 December 2023 – 28 May 2024 Serving with Enock Mthethwa
- Preceded by: Mathole Motshekga

Personal details
- Born: 12 August 1986 (age 40)
- Citizenship: South Africa
- Party: African National Congress
- Education: Walter Sisulu University

Xola Nqola (born 12 August 1986) is a South African politician from the Eastern Cape. A member of the African National Congress (ANC), he is the chairperson of the National Assembly of South Africa's Portfolio Committee on Justice and Constitutional Development.

Nqola is a lawyer by training and joined the National Assembly in May 2019. He was the interim convenor of the ANC Youth League from April 2023 until June 2023, when he was removed from the position under controversial circumstances.

== Early life and career ==
Nqola was born on 12 August 1986. He attended the Walter Sisulu University, where he completed an LLB and where he became active in student politics through the South African Students Congress and the Youth League of the African National Congress (ANC). He also completed a course in thought leadership at the University of South Africa's Thabo Mbeki African Leadership Institute.

Nqola spent stints as an office administrator, as a civil servant in the Engcobo Local Municipality, and as a regional organiser for the ANC in the Eastern Cape. After his LLB graduation and before he became a full-time politician, he was a candidate attorney at Makangela Mntungani Incorporated in Mthatha and Litha Madikizela and Company in Ngcobo.

== National Assembly: 2019–present ==
=== Sixth Parliament: 2019–2024 ===
Nqola became a parliamentary candidate for the ANC in the May 2019 general election. He appeared seventh on the ANC's party list for the Eastern Cape constituency and qualified for a seat in the National Assembly, the lower house of the South African Parliament. In the aftermath of the election he was appointed to represent the ANC as a member of the Portfolio Committee on Justice and Correctional Services, a member of the Joint Constitutional Review Committee, and an alternate member of the Portfolio Committee on International Relations and Cooperation.

In an October 2019 meeting of the justice committee, Nqola proposed the shortlisting of Kholeka Gcaleka as a candidate for the position of Deputy Public Protector, and Gcaleka became the successful candidate in 2020. In subsequent years Nqola was a member of the ad hoc committee that recommended the impeachment of the incumbent Public Protector, Busisiwe Mkhwebane; the ANC delegated him to the committee as a non-voting member when it was established on 7 April 2021. During the impeachment inquiry, Nqola frequently clashed with Julius Malema of the Economic Freedom Fighters, who was among Mkhwebane's defenders; during one such spat in July 2022, Malema called him "a political wannabe", and in an infamous exchange in November 2022 Malema accused Nqola of political "opportunism" and of "suffering from the mind of a peanut, a mind the size of a rat's poo-poo".

On 7 December 2023, Nqola was elected as co-chairperson of the Joint Constitutional Review Committee, which is tasked with conducting an annual review of the South African Constitution; his co-chairperson was Enock Mthethwa of the National Council of Provinces, and he was elected to replace Mathole Motshekga, the former chairperson from the National Assembly.

In addition to his committee appointments, Nqola led the ANC's constituency office in Burgersdorp, Eastern Cape from 2022 to 2024. In March 2024, he was sanctioned on the recommendation of the parliamentary ethics committee for failing to disclose his financial interests timeously as required by the parliamentary code of conduct; he received a formal reprimand in the house and a fine equivalent to 20 days' salary.

=== ANC Youth League convenor: 2022–2023 ===
During his first term in Parliament, Nqola remained active in the ANC's extra-parliamentary structures. In 2022 he was a candidate for election to the ANC National Executive Committee, nominated for membership by 218 local party branches, but he failed to gain election at the party's 55th National Conference.

The following year, on 27 March 2023, the ANC's National Working Committee resolved to appoint Nqola as the interim convenor of the national ANC Youth League. The league had been under the custodianship of an unelected interim leadership since 2019, when Collen Maine's leadership corps was disbanded; Nqola replaced Nonceba Mhlauli as the head of the National Youth Task Team (NYTT) tasked with arranging fresh leadership elections. He worked alongside Sonto Motaung, who was named interim coordinator, and Fasiha Hassan, who was named deputy convenor. Upon taking office as convenor, Nqola said that the NYTT would refuse to allow factional disputes to delay the leadership elections further.

Under Nqola's leadership, the ANC Youth League held its elective conference at Nasrec in July 2023, electing Malatji as the league's president. However, the election was preceded by an apparent dispute between Nqola and members of the ANC's national leadership. The national secretary-general of the mainstream ANC, Fikile Mbalula, was accused of interfering in the NYTT's work, and in April 2023 the Sunday Times reported that Nqola was being sidelined in the NYTT by Mdu Manana, the mainstream ANC's head of organising. On 29 June 2023, the day before the elective conference opened, Mbalula fired Nqola as league convenor, removing him from the NYTT altogether. Mbalula's letter, which was leaked to the press, accused Nqola of "gross ill-discipline and defiance" in connection with the league's recent provincial elective conference in the Eastern Cape. Nqola had apparently allowed the provincial elective conference to go ahead despite procedural irregularities.

However, Nqola's supporters alleged that his removal from the NYTT was a unilateral decision by Mbalula and constituted an example of Mbalula's interference in Youth League affairs, which they said was calculated to favour Malatji's presidential bid. IOL reported that Nqola wrote a letter to the ANC's national leadership to complain about meddling by Mbalula, Manana, and others. Mbalula denied this account, but it was repeated by a group of seven NYTT members in a subsequent protest against the conduct of the elective conference; it was also reportedly raised by Mondli Gungubele and Enoch Godongwana during an ANC National Executive Committee meeting.

=== Seventh Parliament: 2024–present ===
In the May 2024 general election, Nqola was re-elected to his parliamentary seat, now ranked 67th on the ANC's national party list. He became the chairperson of the National Assembly's Portfolio Committee on Justice and Constitutional Development, a restructured iteration of the committee he had served in since 2019. He was elected unopposed to the chair during the committee's first meeting on 9 July 2024, nominated by the ANC's Oscar Mathafa.
