= Portfolio Committee on Justice and Constitutional Development =

Committee in the National Assembly of South Africa

- Formation: 1994 (as Portfolio Committee on Justice)
- Purpose: Oversight of the Department of Justice and Constitutional Development
- Chairperson: Xola Nqola (ANC)
- Parent organisation: National Assembly of South Africa

The Portfolio Committee on Justice and Constitutional Development is a portfolio committee of the National Assembly of South Africa. It is responsible for oversight of the agencies managed by the Minister of Justice and Constitutional Development, including the Department of Justice and Constitutional Development.

The committee was established during the first post-apartheid Parliament as the Portfolio Committee on Justice, chaired for two terms by Johnny de Lange. It was renamed as the Portfolio Committee on Justice and Constitutional Development after the Department of Justice was renamed accordingly. Between 2014 and 2024, it oversaw an enlarged portfolio as the Portfolio Committee on Justice and Correctional Services; the enlarged committee was created in a merger between the justice committee and Portfolio Committee on Correctional Services, precipitated by the corresponding ministerial merger that created the Ministry of Justice and Correctional Services.

In addition to overseeing the Department of Justice and Constitutional Development, the committee oversees a long list of statutory entities related to justice and law enforcement: the Council for Debt Collectors, Legal Aid South Africa, the National Prosecuting Authority, the Office of the Chief Justice, the Public Protector, the Rules Board for Courts of Law, the South African Board for Sheriffs, the South African Human Rights Commission, and the Special Investigating Unit.

== List of chairpersons ==
To date, all chairpersons of the Committee have been members of the African National Congress (ANC), the national governing party.

=== 2024–present: Justice and Constitutional Development ===
Chairpersons of the Committee on Justice and Constitutional Development
Session	Chairperson	Party	Election date	Citation
7th Parliament	Xola Nqola	ANC	9 July 2024	

=== 2014–2024: Justice and Correctional Services ===
Chairpersons of the Committee on Justice and Correctional Services
Session	Chairperson	Party	Election date	Citation
6th Parliament	Gratitude Magwanishe	ANC	2 July 2019	
5th Parliament	Refiloe Mothapo	ANC	9 October 2018	
5th Parliament	Mathole Motshekga	ANC	24 June 2014	

=== 1994–2014: Justice and Constitutional Development ===
Chairpersons of the Committee on Justice
Session	Chairperson	Party	Election date	Citation
4th Parliament	Luwellyn Landers	ANC	November 2010	
4th Parliament	Ngoako Ramatlhodi	ANC	1 June 2009	
3rd Parliament	Fatima Chohan-Kota	ANC	11 May 2004	
2nd Parliament	Johnny de Lange	ANC	16 August 1999	
1st Parliament	Johnny de Lange	ANC	1994	
