= Youth in South Africa =

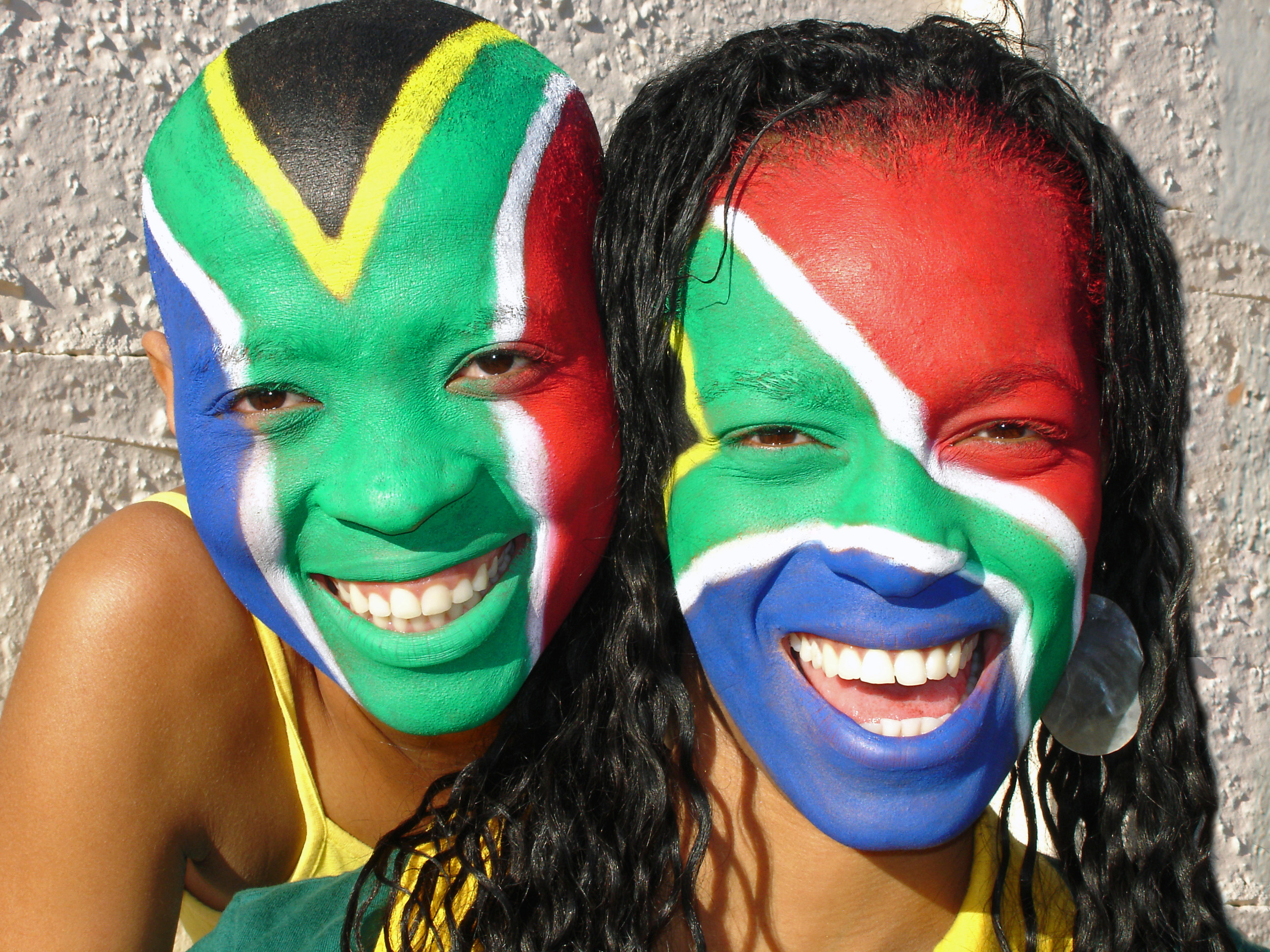
Two young South Africans at the 2010 FIFA World Cup

Youth in South Africa are defined by South Africa's National Youth Commission Act, 1996 as those aged 15 through 34 years. In February 2025, Stats SA reported that the South African youth segment totaled approximately 21 million individuals, constituting 33.1% of the country's population.

Like many other developing countries, South Africa's population as a whole is quite young. The elevated level of youth population was, around 2010, expected to exist for another 20 to 30 years (therefore roughly 5 to 15 years as of 2026). The large proportion of working-age population presents South Africa with a time period of opportunity for human capital and economic development.

Although South Africa transitioned from apartheid to a multiracial democracy in the early-1990s, the policies from the apartheid era have left a continued legacy of significant inequalities. The burden of many of these inequalities falls on South African youth in terms of education, employment, poverty, and health outcomes.

Previous government policies in South Africa have been unfavourable for twenty-first century youth, diminishing their ability to engage meaningfully in socio-economic and political activities of society. During apartheid, many youths were arrested and detained in jail, often without trial; many children were held in adult prisons.

Youth policy is guided by the National Youth Policy (2009-2014), which was developed based on a series of legislative frameworks from 1994 onwards. These legislative and policy frameworks include: the National Youth Commission Act, 1996; White Paper for Social Welfare, 1997; National Youth Development Policy Framework, 2000–2007; and the Draft National Youth Policy, 2008–2013.

== Education ==
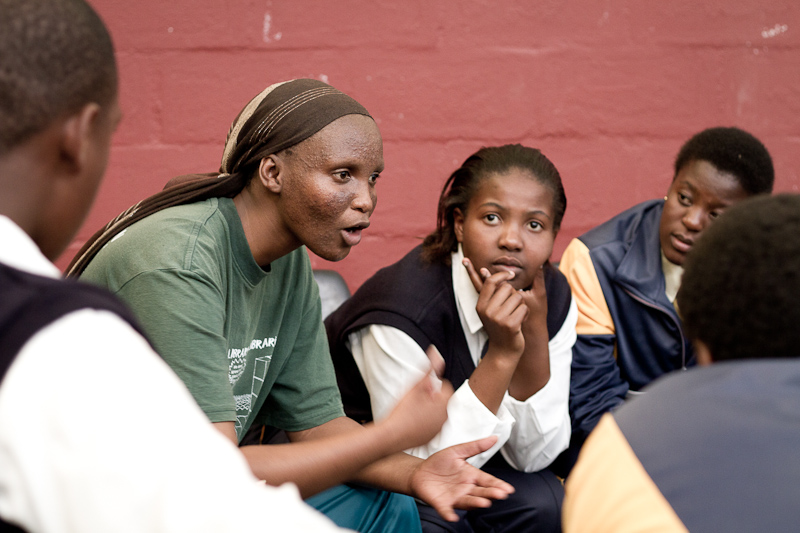
Youth education equality activists of the Equalizers speak to Yoliswa Dwane

Youth in the twenty-first century are more highly educated than in previous decades due to the expansion of youth educational opportunities since the end of apartheid. Older generations have lower levels of average education achievement than younger ones, which is attributable to the apartheid government policies regarding education. According to the South African National Census of 2011, 40.6% of those aged 20–24 years completed grade 12; only 9.9% of those aged 80 years or more completed grade 12.

Secondary school enrollment has increased for disadvantaged groups. Despite this, few gains have been made in decreasing the number of young people with little or no education. Race and gender inequalities influence who continues to higher levels of education; black South Africans report that finances are the biggest factor in leaving school. Disabled youth tend to be underrepresented in the education system, which leads to high rates of unemployment.

Only 11 percent of black South African youth and 7 percent of coloured youth in the 18-24 year age bracket are in University, compared to 60 percent of white South African youth as of 2014. Poor quality primary and secondary schooling are key reasons for the low rates of black and coloured South Africans attending tertiary education.

== Unemployment ==
In 2013, about 70% of all the unemployed people in South Africa were youth. The 2011 South African census found that people in the youngest age groups (15–19 years and 20–24 years) face the most difficult challenges in the country's labour market. More than two-thirds of people between 18 and 35 years of age were unemployed according to a 2009 study. Unemployment rates in South Africa generally decline with increasing age. The labour force participation rate is also the lowest for the youngest age groups.

Young people are disproportionately affected by unemployment in South Africa, meaning their unemployment rate is higher compared with other age groups. Generally, as levels of education increase, employment rates increase. This has not been the case in South Africa. Since 1995, unemployment rates have increased the fastest for those who have completed secondary school or university.

The young people who are fortunate enough to obtain employment are often assisted by personal contacts or networks. Black youth often do not have access to these networks and do not receive adequate career guidance. Students from historically disadvantaged institutions are less likely to attain employment than their wealthier peers. Amongst the South African population as a whole, Black South Africans have the highest unemployment rates; White South Africans have the lowest unemployment rates.

As is the case internationally, South African youth with disabilities are at a disadvantage for gaining employment, despite some government efforts to address the employment disparity. Barriers to employment for youth with disability include: social attitudes, beliefs, and misconceptions regarding disability as a negative trait.

== Poverty ==
Approximately 40% of South Africans lived in poverty as of 2009. Approximately 17,000,000 young people under eighteen years of age in South Africa are estimated to be living in poverty. 60.5% of South African youth aged 15–24 years old live in low-income households. For youth aged 25–34, the percentage of those living in low-income households was 44%. Poverty disproportionally affects racial groups in South Africa. Approximately 66% of Black African youth and 44% of Coloured youth live in poverty, compared to 16% of Indian youth and 4% of White youth.

South African youth in poverty often look to higher education as a means to a better life. However, access to higher education is often limited for those who are impoverished and from rural areas.

South Africa's social welfare system does not specifically target youth. Child recipients of the child support grants remain eligible to receive money until the age of eighteen; however, youth aged 18–34 years old can only benefit directly from disability grants.

== Health ==
While young people generally comprise the healthiest section of society, youth face a variety of health risks in South Africa. Alcohol consumption is on the rise among youth, and there are strong links between alcohol consumption and risky sexual behavior among adolescents. Suicide is considered a major public health concern for youth in South Africa.

No recent population-wide, comprehensive, reliable data is available on suicide attempts and deaths in South Africa. However, it is estimated that Black young men and women in South Africa have proportionally higher suicides and higher rates than their older counterparts. In 2003, South Africa recorded 25 deaths per 100,000 adolescents due to suicide; this is higher than the international average of 23 per 100,000. Non-fatal suicidal behavior tends to peak in the second decade of life for all South Africans. It is estimated that about one third of all non-fatal suicidal behaviors involve children and adolescents; and 25% of rural young men report suicidal thoughts

HIV/AIDS is a notably prominent threat to the health of South African youth. South Africa carries the greatest burden of HIV-infected individuals in the world.

Among youth, the burden of HIV tends to fall on females. As of 2013, young women in the 15-19 age bracket have a HIV prevalence rate of 5.2%; for men this age, the prevalence rate is 1.2%. In the 20-24 age bracket, women have a 17.9% HIV prevalence rate; men in this age range have a prevalence rate of 5.6%.

Community development policy in South Africa highlights the need for 'the active involvement of young people in national development' and the vital importance 'for their participation in national, provincial and local development programmes.'

The involvement of young people in the fight against HIV/AIDS is a key foundation for successful HIV/AIDS management, South African policy, and international policy. The youth struggle with HIV/AIDS is closely linked with youth social development. In response, the South African government has created many community development and HIV/AIDS interventions to curb the epidemic and increase youth participation in such programs. Despite this, a substantial reduction in youth HIV prevalence has not been achieved.
