= Ronald Lamola =

South African lawyer and politician (born 1983)

The Honourable Ronald Lamola MP
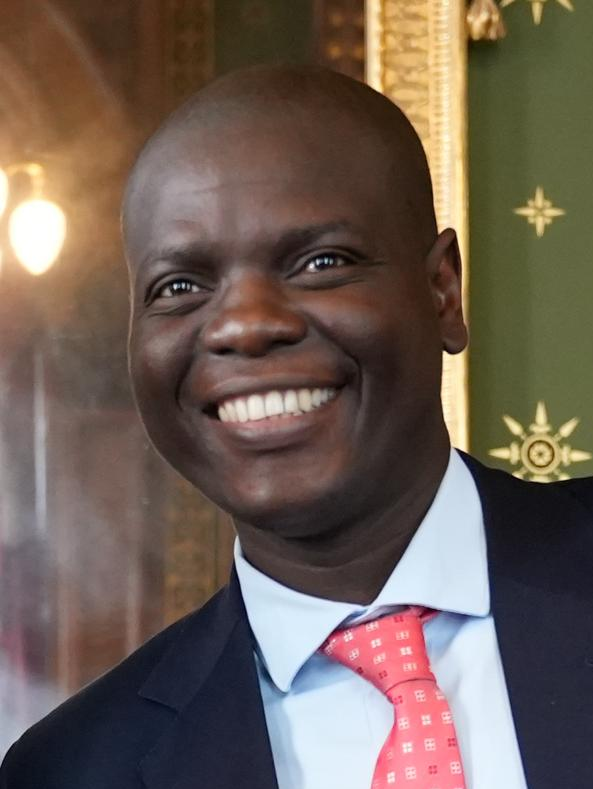
- Lamola in 2024

Minister of International Relations and Cooperation
- Incumbent
- Assumed office 3 July 2024
- President: Cyril Ramaphosa
- Deputy: Alvin Botes; Thandi Moraka
- Preceded by: Naledi Pandor

Minister of Justice and Correctional Services
- In office 30 May 2019 – 30 June 2024
- President: Cyril Ramaphosa
- Deputy: John Jeffery; Inkosi Phathekile Holomisa
- Preceded by: Michael Masutha
- Succeeded by: Thembi Nkadimeng (Minister of Justice and Constitutional Development); Pieter Groenewald (Minister of Correctional Services)

Member of the National Assembly of South Africa
- Incumbent
- Assumed office 22 May 2019

Deputy President of the African National Congress Youth League
- In office June 2011 – April 2012
- President: Julius Malema
- Preceded by: Andile Lungisa
- Succeeded by: Desmond Moela

Personal details
- Born: Ronald Ozzy Lamola; 21 November 1983 (age 42) Bushbuckridge, Transvaal Province, South Africa
- Party: African National Congress
- Spouse: Bawinile "Winnie" Msiza (m. 2013)
- Education: Mchacka High School.: University of Venda (Law degree); University of South Africa (PLT); University of Pretoria (LLM); Wits Enterprise (PGC)
- Occupation: Lawyer; politician; legislator; businessman; youth activist

Ronald Ozzy Lamola (born 21 November 1983) is a South African lawyer and politician who is the Minister of International Relations and Cooperation as a Member of the National Assembly of South Africa since 22 May 2019 as a member of the African National Congress (ANC). He was Minister of Justice and Correctional Services from May 2019 to June 2024. He is a member of the ANC's National Executive Committee and National Working Committee. Lamola had previously been involved in the African National Congress Youth League.

== Early life and education ==
Ronald Ozzy Lamola was born 21 November 1983 in the town of Bushbuckridge, then part of South Africa's Transvaal Province. He joined the ANC Youth League at the age of thirteen in 1996. In 2000, he matriculated from Mchacka High School. He soon enrolled for a law degree at the University of Venda. During his time at the university, he was President of the Student Representative Council (SRC) and Chairperson of the South African Students Congress in Limpopo.

He achieved a practical legal training degree from the University of South Africa in 2006. In 2008, he obtained a post-graduate certificate in corporate law from the University of South Africa. Later on, he received a post-graduate certificate in banking law and the financial markets. Lamola acquired an LLM in corporate law from the University of Pretoria. He attained a post-graduate certificate in telecommunications policy and regulation and management from Wits Enterprise. He holds two master's degrees from the University of Pretoria.

== Early career ==
Lamola started his law career as a lawyer at TMN Kgomo and Associates in 2006. Later on, in 2009, he was employed as a manager of the Govan Mbeki Local Municipality. He was the Director in the Office of the Mpumalanga MEC for Culture, Sports and Recreation from 2009 until 2011. Shortly after in 2011, he briefly served as the acting spokesperson for the Mpumalanga Premier David Mabuza.

He is a former Deputy President of the African National Congress Youth League (ANCYL). He served alongside Youth League President Julius Malema prior to Malema's expulsion from the position in 2012 for bringing the party into disrepute. In 2012, Lamola called for the amendment of the Constitution that would allow the state to expropriate land without compensation. He said that white owners should voluntarily relinquish some of their land and mines rather than requiring the government to compel them through legislation, warning that otherwise they could face “angry black youths flooding their farms”. Lamola warned that failure to transfer land from white South Africans to poor black South Africans could result in land invasions similar to those that had occurred in Zimbabwe. TAU SA and AfriForum consequently laid criminal charges of intimidation and instituted hate speech proceedings in the Equality Court against Lamola The ANCYL issued a statement calling AfriForum "the defenders of white privilege".

Lamola is a fierce critic of former ANC President Jacob Zuma. He openly endorsed Kgalema Motlanthe to succeed Zuma in 2012.

For the 2014 elections, Lamola was a candidate for the National Assembly since he was 175th on the ANC's national list. Due to the ANC's electoral performance, he was not elected to Parliament. After the 2015 ANCYL elective conference, Lamola disappeared from the public eye and subsequently managed his own law firm. In 2021, GroundUp reported that Ndobela Lamola Inc., a law firm of which Lamola was one of two directors at the time, had been commissioned by the National Lotteries Commission to investigate allegations of corruption and nepotism involving former NLC chief operating officer Phillemon Letwaba. The firm produced three reports that cleared Letwaba of wrongdoing. However, GroundUp reported that the investigations failed to identify apparent forgeries, improperly analysed financial documents and did not interview a key witness. The firm also reportedly received millions of rand from the NLC for its work. Lamola denied personal involvement in the investigations.

In 2017, Lamola endorsed Cyril Ramaphosa to become ANC President. In December of the same year, Lamola was elected to the National Executive Committee of the African National Congress (NEC). Shortly after, in January 2018, the ANC NEC appointed him to the party's National Working Committee, the party's highest decision-making structure.

Following the May 2019 elections, Lamola took office as a Member of the National Assembly. President Cyril Ramaphosa appointed him to the post of Minister of Justice and Correctional Services on 29 May. He assumed office the following day.

Lamola was re-elected to a seat on the ANC NEC at the party's 55th National Conference held in December 2022. He was re-elected to the NWC in January 2023.

In September 2023, Lamola was appointed head of the ANC NEC Sub-committee on Constitutional and Legal Affairs, replacing Cyril Xaba, who was appointed head of the party's National Dispute Resolution Committee.

=== Minister of Justice and Correctional Services ===
Lamola served as Minister of Justice and Correctional services from May 2019 to June 2024. During his tenure, the Department pursued the modernisation and digitisation of the South African justice system. This included efforts to expand electronic court services and improve information-sharing between institutions within the Integrated Justice System, including the South African Police Service, National Prosecuting Authority (NPA) and Department of Justice and Correctional Services. His tenure coincided with efforts to rebuild institutions affected by state capture, strengthen the National Prosecuting Authority (NPA), reform anti-corruption mechanisms, improve access to courts and address problems in South Africa's correctional system. During this time, the Department also faced several high-profile challenges, including slow progress in major state-capture prosecutions, the unsuccessful attempt to extradite Atul and Rajesh Gupta from the United Arab Emirates (UAE), and the escape of convicted murderer and rapist Thabo Bester from the Mangaung Correctional Centre.

=== Minister of International Relations and Cooperation ===
On 3 July 2024, he was sworn in as the Minister of International Relations and Cooperation as part of President Cyril Ramaphosa's third cabinet, succeeding Naledi Pandor. This followed the formation of a Government of National Unity (GNU) through a grand coalition, after the ANC lost its absolute majority in the 2024 election.

As Foreign Minister, Lamola was faced with the significant task of continuing the robust and assertive foreign policy stance that South Africa has developed in recent years following the tenure of Pandor. South African newspaper, Mail & Guardian, wrote that South Africa's foreign policy was unlikely to change under Lamola's leadership and would continue with the foreign policy strategy implemented during the sixth administration.

=== G20 Summit ===
With South Africa having hosted the 2025 G20 summit in Johannesburg which concluded on the 23rd of November 2025, Lamola served as one of South Africa's representative at the leader's summit while serving as the leader of DIRCO. In 2024, Minister Lamola traveled to Brazil and met Brazil's Foreign Minister Mauro Vieira for a working visit at the Itamaraty Palace, in the context of the handover of the G20 presidency from Brazil to South Africa. During the meeting of the two Foreign Ministers underscored the significant contribution of the Global South to the G20, highlighting the sequence of presidencies held by Indonesia (2022), India (2023), Brazil (2024) and, as of December 1, 2024, by South Africa. They also discussed prospects for the South African presidency and its role in promoting key issues for developing countries, such as sustainable development, social inclusion and global governance reform. At the Summit Lamola emphasized the importance of following through on promises to address pressing global issues such as hunger, poverty, inequality, and climate change. Lamola outlined South Africa's priorities for the 2025 G20 summit focusing on South Africa's Artificial Intelligence (AI) and Innovation as a transformative tool for development in bridging the technological gap between Africa and developed nations. Solidarity and Sustainability, Tourism and Global Opportunities and continued scrutiny and accountability from citizens to ensure the commitments made at the G20 are realized

=== BRICS ===
Lamola spoke positively about bilateral relations with fellow BRICS members, China and Russia ahead of the 2024 BRICS summit in Russia. Lamola attended the 16th BRICS summit in, Kazan, Russia. Accompanying President Cyril Ramaphosa. South Africa and President Ramaphosa had been criticized for its stance on the Russo-Ukraine War with its non-aligned stance. At the summit, Ramaphosa called on the world to remain committed to the peaceful resolution of all disputes through negotiation and inclusive dialogue, and stated that leaders must find lasting solutions to conflicts in different parts of the globe.

=== Palestine ===
In July 2024, he criticized Israel's occupation of the Palestinian territories, saying that the ICJ ruling on the Israeli occupation "affirms South Africa's long-standing position that the occupation by Israel of Palestinian territory remains unlawful under international law". While speaking at symposium on South Africa's national interests and global advancements, Lamola that South Africa would continue to do everything in its power to power to preserve the existence of the Palestinian people as a group.

=== China ===
On the 2nd of September 2024, Lamola met with Foreign Minister of China, Wang Yi, In Beijing, for the Summit of the Forum on China-Africa Cooperation (FOCAC). FOCAC has effectively promoted Africa's development, becoming an important symbol of South-South cooperation and driving international cooperation with Africa. The discussions focused on enhancing bilateral relations and preparing for the upcoming 2024 Summit of the Forum on China-Africa Cooperation (FOCAC). Lamola highlighted the upgraded relationship between South Africa and China, now a comprehensive strategic partnership. Lamola reaffirmed South Africa's adherence to the one-China policy and its support for China's global initiatives. He expressed eagerness to work with China to enhance cooperation among Global South countries.

=== United States ===
In September 2024, Lamola made his first trip to the United States as Foreign Minister for a working visit to enhance bilateral relations between South Africa and the US. During the visit, Lamola, met with Secretary of State Antony Blinken. The two emphasized the importance of the U.S.-South Africa partnership. They committed to continue to work together on shared priorities such as economic development, health diplomacy, and multilateral institutional reform Lamola also met with the Congressional Black Caucus Foundation's 53rd Annual Legislative Conference in Washington, D.C. where he said that South Africa condemns what happened to the people of Israel on 7 October, and that South Africa condemned it in the strongest terms and calls for the release of all the hostages.

Following the election victory of Donald Trump, Lamola stated that South Africa was optimistic about a Trump Presidency and that there is an urgent need for South Africa's presence in the US. President Ramaphosa appointed Ebrahim Rasool as South Africa's Ambassador to the United States. Upon Rasool's appointment, Lamola stated the appointment was key to ensuring smooth trade talks with the US and to ensure the protection of African Growth and Opportunity Act (Agoa). South Africa had found itself at a crossroads with compliance concerns while continued access to the lucrative US market, compliance barriers and a complex relationship with the US raise concerns about the future of South Africa's support non-aligned stance in the Russo-Ukraine War. Lamola stated that challenges in US-South Africa relations but said disagreements would be resolved through engagement.

=== SADC ===
Mozambique

Following the post-election violence in neighboring, Mozambique and fellow SADC member. Lamola called for calm. The violence in the country resulted in the death of at least 30 people after the election of Daniel Chapo as President of Mozambique. The Department of International Relations issued a travel warning to Mozambique, and the South African Border Management Authority, closed the Lembobo border post after protestors damaged infrastructure.

== Personal life ==
Lamola married Bawinile "Winnie" Msiza at the Cunning Moor in Bushbuckridge, Mpumalanga, on 8 March 2013. Lamola is the son of a Swati mother and Tsonga father. Lamola is also an avid mountain biker and supporter of South African football team, Kaizer Chiefs.
