= Mcebo Dlamini =

Swazi-born South African politician

- Born: 17 December 1986 (age 39); Mbabane, Swaziland
- Education: University of Witwatersrand
- Occupation: Politician
- Known for: #FeesMustFall
- Political party: African National Congress
- Movement: South African Students Congress

Mcebo Dlamini is a Swazi-born South African politician who was one of the prominent leaders of the #FeesMustFall protests in South Africa which led to a conversation on the introduction of free tertiary education for the poor, mainly black students, in the country.

In January 2026, Orlando Pirates FC announced that Dlamini has been appointed to the role of chief administrator.

== Sisulu lineage claims ==
While a student at the University of the Witwatersrand, he claimed to be the grandson of the late ANC stalwart Walter Sisulu. He introduced himself as Mcebo Olyate Sisulu, lovechild of Zwelakhe Sisulu and a Swazi princess. The brother of Zwelakhe, Max Sisulu, later said: "My family knows nothing of a Mcebo."

During a meeting with journalists from Wits Vuvuzela, he said, "My name is Mcebo Freedom Dlamini. That’s my stage name [Mcebo Sisulu], that’s the name I decided to call myself when I’m excited." Asked if he is the son of Zwelakhe Sisulu, he said, "No I am not." Asked if he is indeed a Sisulu, Dlamini said, "I'm not."

== Expulsion from student leadership ==
A former President of the Students' Representative Council of the University of the Witwatersrand, he was expelled in 2015 for misconduct. He gained notoriety following controversial remarks, including praising Adolf Hitler for killing white people as opposed to other leaders, who he said had killed only black people. Dlamini defended his comments following outcry from South African Jews, claiming that "the same thing Hitler was doing to the Jews, they are doing to the Palestinians". He supports the BDS campaign.

== Arrest ==
He was arrested in 2016 and charged with violating a court order, public violence, theft, malicious damage to property, and assaulting an officer during the protest.

== Sentencing ==
On 9 March 2020, the Johannesburg Magistrate's Court sentenced Dlamini to two years, wholly suspended for five years, for public violence. He was also given six months' imprisonment, again wholly suspended for five years, for unlawfully staying in the country.
