= Minister of Justice and Constitutional Development =

South African cabinet minister

South Africa Minister of Justice and Constitutional Development
- Flag of South Africa
- Incumbent; Mmamoloko Kubayi since 3 December 2024
- Department of Justice and Constitutional Development
- Style: The Honourable
- Appointer: President of South Africa
- Inaugural holder: J. B. M. Hertzog
- Formation: 31 May 1910
- Deputy: Andries Nel
- Salary: R2 401 633

The Minister of Justice and Constitutional Development is the justice minister in the Cabinet of South Africa. The minister is the political head of the Department of Justice and Constitutional Development and the Office of the Chief Justice. DoJCD in turn is responsible for administrative support to the courts, oversight of the National Prosecuting Authority, the provision of legal services to departments of state, and law reform.

The minister was called the Minister of Justice until 1999, when constitutional matters were added to his portfolio. Between May 2014 and June 2024, the Department of Correctional Services was subsumed under the ministry, which was led by the Minister of Justice and Correctional Services. This merger was reversed at the outset of President Cyril Ramaphosa's third cabinet, when a separate minister of correctional services was appointed.

== History ==
In the 20th century, the South African justice minister was called the minister of justice. His purview included prisons until late 1990, when President F. W. de Klerk announced extensive prison reforms and established a separate Ministry of Prisons. Constitutional matters were also a separate portfolio under the minister of constitutional development, and then from 1994 under the minister of constitutional development and provincial affairs. At the outset of the second cabinet of President Thabo Mbeki in June 1999, constitutional development was detached from provincial affairs and subsumed under justice, under the minister of justice and constitutional development.

A further merger took place in May 2014, at the outset of President Jacob Zuma's second cabinet, when correctional services was subsumed under the ministry, creating the minister of justice and correctional services. However, the Department of Correctional Services remained distinct from the Department of Justice and Constitutional Development; although they shared a political head or executive authority, they were operationally and legislatively distinct. They reported to the same parliamentary body, the Portfolio Committee on Justice and Correctional Services, but separately. Each of the two deputy ministers was responsible for one portfolio: John Jeffery was responsible for the justice portfolio, and Thabang Makwetla and his successor, Patekile Holomisa, were responsible for correctional services.

Appointing his third cabinet on 30 June 2024, President Cyril Ramaphosa reversed the merger effected by Zuma, appointing a minister of justice and constitutional development alongside a separate minister of correctional services.

Three prime ministers have been minister of justice, including two – Jan Smuts and B. J. Vorster – who held the position directly before being elected prime minister. In 2004, Brigitte Mabandla became the first woman to be appointed to the portfolio.

== List of ministers ==
=== Justice (1910–1999) ===
Minister	Party	Incumbency	President	Deputy
J. B. M. Hertzog	SAP	1910–1912	Louis Botha	
Jacobus Wilhelmus Sauer	SAP	1912–1913	Louis Botha	
Nicolaas Jacobus de Wet	SAP	1913–1924	Louis Botha Jan Smuts	
Tielman Roos	NP	1924–1929	J. B. M. Hertzog	
Oswald Pirow	NP	1929–1933	J. B. M. Hertzog	
Jan Smuts	SAP/UP	1933–1939	J. B. M. Hertzog	
Colin Fraser Steyn	UP	1939–1945	Jan Smuts	
Harry Lawrence	UP	1945–1948	Jan Smuts	
Charles Robberts Swart	NP	1948–1959	Daniel François Malan J. G. Strijdom Hendrik Verwoerd	
Frans Erasmus	NP	1959–1961	Hendrik Verwoerd	
B. J. Vorster	NP	1961–1966	Hendrik Verwoerd	
Petrus Cornelius Pelser	NP	1966–1974	B. J. Vorster	
Jimmy Kruger	NP	1974–1979	B. J. Vorster P. W. Botha	
Alwyn Schlebusch	NP	1979–1980	P. W. Botha	
Kobie Coetsee	NP	1980–1994	P. W. Botha F. W. de Klerk	
Dullah Omar	ANC	10 May 1994 – 14 June 1999	Nelson Mandela (I)	Chris Fismer; Gert Myburgh; Sheila Camerer

=== Justice and constitutional development (1999–2014) ===
Minister	Party	Incumbency	President	Deputy
Penuell Maduna	ANC	18 June 1999 – 29 April 2004	Thabo Mbeki (I)	Cheryl Gillwald
Brigitte Mabandla	ANC	29 April 2004 – 24 September 2008	Thabo Mbeki (II)	Johnny de Lange
Enver Surty	ANC	25 September 2008 – 9 May 2009	Kgalema Motlanthe (I)	Johnny de Lange
Jeff Radebe	ANC	10 May 2009 – 24 May 2014	Jacob Zuma (I)	Andries Nel John Jeffery

=== Justice and correctional services (2014–2024) ===
Minister	Party	Incumbency	President	Deputies
Michael Masutha	ANC	25 May 2014 – 29 May 2019	Jacob Zuma (II) Cyril Ramaphosa (I)	John Jeffery (DoJCD) Thabang Makwetla (DCS)
Ronald Lamola	ANC	30 May 2019 – 19 June 2024	Cyril Ramaphosa (II)	John Jeffery (DoJCD) Patekile Holomisa (DCS)

=== Justice and constitutional development (2024–present) ===
Minister	Party	Incumbency	President	Deputies
Mmamoloko Kubayi	ANC	3 December 2024 – present	Cyril Ramaphosa (III)	Andries Nel
Thembi Simelane	ANC	3 July 2024 – 3 December 2024	Cyril Ramaphosa (III)	Andries Nel

== Institutions overseen by the ministry ==
The following institutions are housed in the justice and correctional services portfolio, although most have a significant degree of operational and statutory independence:

- Department of Justice and Constitutional Development
- Office of the Chief Justice
- Public Protector
- National Prosecuting Authority
- Legal Aid South Africa
- South African Human Rights Commission
- Electoral Commission
- Judicial Service Commission
