= Enver Surty =

South African politician

Mohamed Surty

Deputy Minister of Basic Education
- In office 11 May 2009 – 7 May 2019
- President: Jacob Zuma→Cyril Ramaphosa
- Minister: Angie Motshekga
- Succeeded by: Reginah Mhaule

Minister of Justice and Constitutional Development
- In office September 2008 – 10 May 2009
- President: Jacob Zuma
- Preceded by: Brigitte Mabandla
- Succeeded by: Jeff Radebe

Deputy Minister of Education
- In office April 2004 – September 2008
- President: Thabo Mbeki→ Kgalema Motlanthe
- Minister: Naledi Pandor
- Succeeded by: ministry split

Personal details
- Born: 15 August 1953 (age 73)
- Party: African National Congress
- Education: University of the Western Cape, Completed 1995 Master of Laws, University of Durban-Westville Completed 1973, Bachelor of Arts, University of Durban-Westville Completed 1974, Bachelor of Arts.

Mohamed Enver Surty (born 15 August 1953) is a South African politician who served as the Deputy Minister of Basic Education in the cabinet of President Cyril Ramaphosa from 2009 till 2019. He is a member of the African National Congress.

A lawyer by education, he served as Deputy Minister of Education from April 2004 till September 2008. He was deployed to the Ministry of Justice and Constitutional Development in September 2008 serving as Minister until 2009. Appointed to the post of Deputy Minister of Basic Education by President Jacob Zuma, he continued in that position under Cyril Ramaphosa.

Surty was born on 15 August 1953. He holds Bachelor of Arts degree from University of Durban-Westville, Honours degree (Philosophy), and BProc degree from University of South Africa (UNISA). He completed an LLM degree in Constitutional Litigation from University of the Western Cape (UWC) in 1996 and a Postgraduate Certificate in Higher education. He was admitted as Attorney in 1977 and practiced as an attorney and human Rights Lawyer in Rustenburg from 1977 until 1994. He became a Minister of Justice and Constitutional Development from September 2008 to May 2009, but also had served as Member of Parliament from 1994 until 2004. He was a member of the Management Committee of the Constitutional Assembly and negotiator for the ANC on the Bill of Rights.

== See also ==
- African Commission on Human and Peoples' Rights
- Constitution of South Africa
- History of the African National Congress
- Politics in South Africa
- Provincial governments of South Africa
