= Michael Masutha =

South African politician

The Honourable Michael Masutha MP
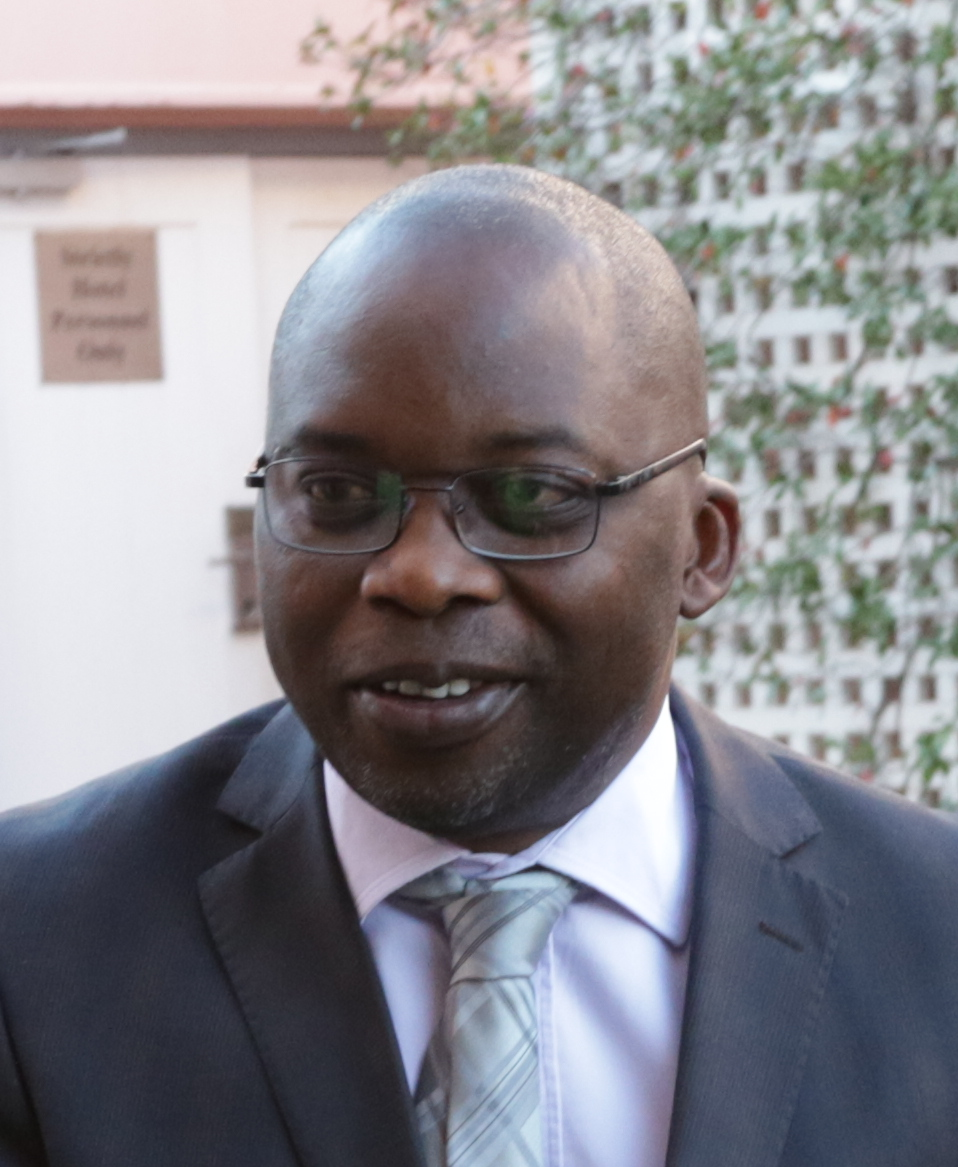
- Masutha in August 2018

Minister of Justice and Correctional Services
- In office 26 May 2014 – 30 May 2019
- President: Jacob Zuma; Cyril Ramaphosa
- Preceded by: Jeff Radebe
- Succeeded by: Ronald Lamola

Deputy Minister of Science and Technology
- In office 9 July 2013 – 25 May 2014
- Minister: Derek Hanekom
- Preceded by: Derek Hanekom
- Succeeded by: Zanele kaMagwaza-Msibi

Personal details
- Born: 1965 (age 60–61) Valdezia, South Africa
- Party: African National Congress

Tshililo Michael Masutha is a South African advocate and retired politician. He was born in Valdezia in 1965 in Northern Transvaal, which is now Limpopo province, in South Africa. He is the former Minister of Justice and Correctional Services. Before becoming MP in 1999, he served as a human rights lawyer. He served as the Deputy Minister of Science and Technology from 2013 to 2014. Born with a visual disability, he was the second minister with a disability to be appointed to Jacob Zuma's cabinet. He founded Northern Transvaal Association for the Blind in 1989.
