= Bilal Hayee =

Pakistani diplomat

Ambassador of Pakistan to Azerbaijan
- Incumbent
- Assumed office June 2020

Personal details
- Occupation: Diplomat

Bilal Hayee is a Pakistani diplomat who is currently serving as ambassador of the Islamic Republic of Pakistan to Sweden since July 2024. He was born December 29, 1970. He is married with two sons.
