= Daniel Ioniță =

Daniel Ioniță may refer to:

- Daniel Ioniță (diplomat), a Romanian diplomat
- Daniel Ioniță (poet), an Australian-Romanian poet
