= Party lists for the 2019 South African election =

Party candidate lists

This article displays the various political parties' party candidate lists for the 2019 South African general election.

The National Assembly of South Africa is elected every five years by party-list proportional representation using closed lists.

== Breakdown ==
Of the 400 Members of the National Assembly, 200 are elected on a national list, while another 200 are allocated among the nine provinces.

| Party | National | Eastern Cape | Free State | Gauteng | KwaZulu-Natal | Limpopo | Mpumalanga | North West | Northern Cape | Western Cape | Total |
|---|---|---|---|---|---|---|---|---|---|---|---|
| ANC | 108 | 18 | 8 | 26 | 24 | 15 | 12 | 9 | 3 | 7 | 230 |
| DA | 42 | 4 | 2 | 12 | 6 | 1 | 1 | 2 | 1 | 13 | 84 |
| EFF | 21 | 2 | 1 | 7 | 4 | 3 | 2 | 2 | 1 | 1 | 44 |
| IFP (Note: Many candidates for the Inkatha Freedom Party were listed on both provincial lists and the national list.) | 7 | 0 | 0 | 1 | 6 | 0 | 0 | 0 | 0 | 0 | 14 |
| VF+ | 7 | 0 | 0 | 2 | 0 | 0 | 0 | 0 | 0 | 1 | 10 |
| ACDP | 3 | 0 | 0 | 0 | 0 | 0 | 0 | 0 | 0 | 1 | 4 |
| UDM | 1 | 1 | 0 | 0 | 0 | 0 | 0 | 0 | 0 | 0 | 2 |
| ATM | 2 | 0 | 0 | 0 | 0 | 0 | 0 | 0 | 0 | 0 | 2 |
| Good | 2 | 0 | 0 | 0 | 0 | 0 | 0 | 0 | 0 | 0 | 2 |
| NFP | 1 | 0 | 0 | 0 | 1 | 0 | 0 | 0 | 0 | 0 | 2 |
| AIC | 2 | 0 | 0 | 0 | 0 | 0 | 0 | 0 | 0 | 0 | 2 |
| COPE | 2 | 0 | 0 | 0 | 0 | 0 | 0 | 0 | 0 | 0 | 2 |
| PAC | 1 | 0 | 0 | 0 | 0 | 0 | 0 | 0 | 0 | 0 | 1 |
| Al Jama-ah | 1 | 0 | 0 | 0 | 0 | 0 | 0 | 0 | 0 | 0 | 1 |
| Total | 200 | 25 | 11 | 48 | 41 | 19 | 15 | 13 | 5 | 23 | 400 |

== African National Congress ==
=== National ===
1. Cyril Ramaphosa (Note: Elected candidates are in bold.)
2. David Dabede Mabuza
3. Samson Gwede Mantashe
4. Nkosazana Clarice Dlamini-Zuma
5. Ronald Ozzy Lamola
6. Fikile April Mbalula
7. Lindiwe Nonceba Sisulu
8. Zwelini Lawrence Mkhize
9. Bhekokwakhe Hamilton Cele
10. Nomvula Paula Mokonyane
11. Grace Naledi Mandisa Pandor
12. Angela Thokozile Didiza
13. Edward Senzo Mchunu
14. Bathabile Olive Dlamini
15. Bonginkosi Emmanuel Nzimande
16. Emmanuel Nkosinathi Mthethwa
17. Matsie Angelina Motshekga
18. Lindiwe Daphne Zulu
19. David Masondo
20. Thandi Ruth Modise
21. Mkhacani Joseph Maswanganyi
22. Tito Titus Mboweni
23. Knowledge Malusi Nkanyezi Gigaba
24. Jackson Mphikwa Mthembu
25. Pakishe Aaron Motsoaledi
26. Kgwaridi Buti Manamela
27. Stella Tembisa Ndabeni-Abrahams
28. Mbangiseni David Mahlobo
29. Dipuo Bertha Letsatsi-Duba
30. Tokozile Xasa
31. Ncediso Goodenough Kodwa
32. Jeffrey Thamsanqa Radebe
33. Nocawe Noncedo Mafu
34. Nosiviwe Noluthando Mapisa-Nqakula
35. Maite Emily Nkoana-Mashabane
36. Cassel Charlie Mathale
37. Ayanda Dlodlo
38. Mildred Nelisiwe Oliphant
39. Godfrey Phumulo Masualle
40. Pemmy Castelina Pamela Majodina
41. Bongani Thomas Bongo
42. Noxolo Kiviet
43. Mmamoloko Tryphosa Kubayi-Ngubane
44. Baleka Mbete
45. Mondli Gungubele
46. Sidumo Mbongeni Dlamini
47. Mokone Collen Maine
48. Pinky Sharon Kekana
49. Tandi Mahambehlala
50. Mathume Joseph Phaahla
51. Violet Sizani Siwela
52. Fikile Devilliers Xasa
53. Barbara Dallas Creecy
54. Siyabonga Cyprian Cwele
55. Rhulani Thembi Siweya
56. Alvin Botes
57. Makgabo Reginah Mhaule
58. Supra Obakeng Ramoeletsi Mahumapelo
59. Phindisile Pretty Xaba-Ntshaba
60. Thembelani Waltermade Thulas Nxesi
61. Nomaindiya Cathleen Mfeketo
62. Boitumelo Elizabeth Moloi
63. Susan Shabangu
64. Kopeng Obed Bapela
65. Desmond Lawrence Moela
66. Kwati Candith Mashego-Dlamini
67. Bekizwe Simon Nkosi
68. Hlengiwe Buhle Mkhize
69. Terence Skhumbuzo Mpanza
70. Pamela Tshwete
71. Tyotyo Hubert James
72. Bongiwe Pricilla Mbinqo-Gigaba
73. Pravin Jamnadas Gordhan
74. Tina Monica Joemat-Pettersson
75. Mosebenzi Joseph Zwane
76. Sylvia Elizabeth Lucas
77. Sango Patekile Holomisa
78. Gratitude Magwanishe
79. Azwihangwisi Faith Muthambi
80. Amos Fish Mahlalela
81. Makhotso Magdeline Sotyu
82. Zwelivelile Mandlesizwe Dalibhunga Mandela
83. Beauty Nomvuzo Dlulane
84. Nomasonto Evelyn Motaung
85. Mcebisi Skwatsha
86. Nomadewuka Nancy Sihlwayi
87. Mmatlala Grace Boroto
88. Machwene Rosina Semenya
89. Sibongile Jeremia Besani
90. Phillip Matsapole Pogiso Modise
91. Claudia Nonhlanhla Ndaba
92. Elizabeth Dipuo Peters
93. Fikile Zachariah Majola
94. Lydia Sindisiwe Chikunga
95. Derek André Hanekom
96. Moleboheng Modise
97. Khumbudzo Phophi Silence Ntshavheni
98. Sahlulele Luzipo
99. Dikeledi Phillistus Magadzi
100. Mathole Serofo Motshekga
101. Nompendulo Thobile Mkhatshwa
102. Jane Seboletswe Mananiso
103. Phoebe Noxolo Abraham
104. Solomon Lechesa Tsenoli
105. Rachel Cecilia Adams
106. Mxolisa Simon Sokatsha
107. Mikateko Golden Mahlaule
108. Thabo Nelson Mmutle
109. Rosemary Nokuzola Capa
110. Sampson Phathakge Makwetla
111. Nombulelo Lilian Hermans
112. Manketsi Mamoabi Emily Tlhape
113. Judy Hermans
114. Fikile Andiswa Masiko
115. Norbert Sfiso Buthelezi
116. Tshoganetso Mpho Adolphina Tongwane
117. Andries Carl Nel
118. Alexandra Jennifer Beukes
119. Emmanuel Ramaotoana Kebby Maphatsoe
120. Zanele Nkomo
121. Wilma Susan Newhoudt-Druchen
122. Matthews Johannes Wolmarans
123. Sharome Renay Van Schalkwyk
124. Senzeni Zokwana
125. Constance Seoposengwe
126. Loyiso Khanyisa Bunye Mpumlwana
127. Kavilan Brandon Pillay
128. Patrick Errol Flusk
129. Keamogetsi Elizabeth Mabebe
130. Xiaomei Havard
131. Tshililo Michael Masutha
132. Gobonamang Prudence Marekwa
133. Zoliswa Albertina Kota-Mpeko
134. Magdalene Louisa Pietersen
135. Nhlanhla Vincent Xaba
136. Jeanine Nothnagel
137. Ebrahim Patel
138. Duduzile Promise Manana
139. Humphrey Mdumzeli Zondelele Mmemezi
140. Nokwanje Selina Leeto
141. Motalane Dewet Monakedi
142. Phori Angeline Phetlhe
143. Hendrietta Ipeleng Bogopane-Zulu
144. Mzameni Richard Mdakane
145. Johlene Christine Ntwane
146. Madala Backson Masuku
147. Nozipho Paulina Tyobeka-Makeke
148. Yunus Ismail Carrim
149. Nuraan Muller
150. Sharon Mahlatse Karabo Nkosi
151. Eunice Mosele Mathe
152. Khusela Lwandlekazi Nobatembu Sangoni
153. Benedict Anthony Duke Martins
154. Hlomane Patrick Chauke
155. Elsie Xabendlini
156. Andrihetha Juliana Jacobs
157. Ramphelane Johnny Bophelo Mohlala
158. Anna Aletta Witbooi
159. Letsiri George Phaahla
160. Nomaswazi Phyllis Mohlala
161. Kgothatso Fortune Mathabathe
162. Nkhobo Khomongoe
163. Yusuf Joseph Mahommed
164. Motseoa Julia Sehanka
165. Winnifred Nongazi Ngobeza
166. Comely Humphrey Maqocwa Maxegwana
167. Mlondolozi Archbald Mkhize
168. Simthembile Kulu
169. Felicity Thobeka Mthintelwa
170. Ngoako Abel Ramatlhodi
171. Tuelo Ernest Meyers
172. Itumeleng Ntsube
173. Bongani Michael Mkongi
174. Irvin Bafana Sibisi
175. Nozabelo Ruth Bhengu
176. Makaringe Richard Baloyi
177. Thabitha Mohlala
178. Theolonuis Nat Nathan Oliphant
179. Moipone Khero Mhlongo
180. Khavhareni Aarone Mahumani
181. Brendaline Nomalanga Tyhaliti
182. Dikgang Vhuru Moiloa
183. Khadi Mary Makubu Moloi
184. Mmaneo Onicca Moloi
185. Ramasela Idah Mashamaite
186. Tsietsi Simon Setona
187. Nomfunelo Rose-Mary Mabedla
188. Edward Zoyisile Njadu
189. Nkagisang Gloria Ngesi
190. Luzuko Bashman
191. Xolani Ronald Sotashe
192. Sibongile Mchunu
193. Thandiwe Gloria Mpondo
194. Eric Nyekemba
195. Martin Thomas Bezuidenhoudt
196. Tsakani Goodness Shiviti
197. Bongani Luvalo
198. Francois Beukman
199. Thandile Babalwa Sunduza

=== Eastern Cape ===
1. Pumza Patricia Dyantyi
2. Nolitha Ntobongwana
3. Ndumiso Capa
4. Zukisa Cheryl Faku
5. Sakhumzi Stoffels Somyo
6. Mary-Ann Lindelwa Dunjwa
7. Xola Nqola
8. Priscilla Tozama Mantashe
9. Nqabisa Gantsho
10. Gordon Gcinikhaya Mpumza
11. Nokuzola Gladys Tolashe
12. Mncedisi Nontsele
13. Zamuxolo Joseph Peter
14. Cedric Thomas Frolick
15. Busisiwe Tshwete
16. Nonkosi Queenie Mvana
17. Zola Mlenzana
18. Sheilla Tembalam Xego
19. Princess Faku
20. Phumeza Theodora Mpushe
21. Dingaan Jacob Myolwa
22. Zolile Burns-Ncamashe
23. Nomfundo Mabunu
24. Philip Sisimone Rakaibe
25. Mason Mac Kay

=== Free State ===
1. Madala Louis David Ntombela
2. Bhekizizwe Abram Radebe
3. Thanduxolo David Khalipha
4. Nomsa Josephina Kubheka
5. Kathleen Dibolelo Mahlatsi
6. Xolisile Shinars Qayiso
7. Dikeledi Rosemary Direko
8. Lawrence Edward Mc Donald
9. Sindiswa Thelmonia Maneli
10. Makhwenkwe Melton Fikizolo
11. Majohanna Doreen Mthombeni

=== Gauteng ===
1. Tshilidzi Bethuel Munyai
2. Bertha Peace Mabe
3. Boyce Makhosonke Maneli
4. Judith Tshabalala
5. Teliswa Mgweba
6. Mfana Robert Mashego
7. Jacqueline Motlagomang Mofokeng
8. Matshidiso Melina Gomba
9. Simphiwe Gcwele Nomvula Mbatha
10. Anthony Hope Mankwana Papo
11. Oscar Masarona Mathafa
12. Maidi Dorothy Mabiletsa
13. Anastasia Motaung
14. Walter Tebogo Letsie
15. Nomathemba Hendrietta Maseko-Jele
16. Duma Moses Nkosi
17. Bernice Swarts
18. Thlologelo Malatji
19. Moloko Maggie Tlou
20. Lisa Nkosinathi Mangcu
21. Makgathatso Charlotte Chana Pilane-Majake
22. Heinrich Giovanni April
23. Annah Gela
24. Mohatla Alfred Tseki
25. Gerhardus Willem Koornhof
26. Bafuze Sicelo Yabo
27. Anthea Ramolobeng
28. Cristopher Nakampe Malematja
29. Xolani Nkuleko Msimango
30. Matshidiso Morwa Annastinah Mfikoe
31. Sello Meshack Maetso
32. Kate Sibongile Msibi
33. Nkosiyakhe Amos Masondo
34. Nonceba Agnes Molwele
35. Thabani Tholinhlanhla Luhlongwane
36. Nomathemba Celiwe Khanyile
37. Sipho Alexandra Mkhize
38. Amalia Leanette Fisher
39. Mxolisi Eric Xayiya
40. Deborah Dineo Raphuti
41. Sello Albert Tleane
42. Ismail Vadi
43. Dikeledi Rebecca Tsotetsi
44. Bennett Mlamli Nikani
45. Velhelmina Pulani Mogotsi
46. Ian Mzoxolo Nonkumbi
47. Inathi Mirranda Mbiyo
48. Sello Ernest Pitso

=== KwaZulu-Natal ===
1. Vusumuzi Cyril Xaba
2. Sibongiseni Maxwell Dhlomo
3. Nomalungelo Gina
4. Thembeka Vuyisile Buyisile Mchunu
5. Njabulo Bheka Nzuza
6. Nomvuzo Francisca Shabalala
7. Dorah Dunana Dlamini
8. Audrey Sbongile Zuma
9. Duduzile Patricia Sibiya
10. Sibusiso Welcome Mdabe
11. Eric Makhosini Nkosi
12. Jabulile Cynthia Nightingale Mkhwanazi
13. Bavelile Gloria Hlongwa
14. Lizzie Fikelephi Shabalala
15. Mervyn Alexander Dirks
16. Beauty Thulani Zibula
17. Alice Hlebani Mthembu
18. Nobuhle Pamela Nkabane
19. Ernest Thokozani Myeni
20. Regina Mina Mpontseng Lesoma
21. Makhoni Maria Ntuli
22. Sibusiso Nigel Gumede
23. Thandiwe Rose Marry Zungu
24. John Harold Jeffery
25. Lindiwe Ntombikayise Mjobo
26. Sibongile Mchunu
27. Fikile Eunice Khumalo
28. Nkosinathi Emmanuel Dlamini
29. Khulani Elphas Richard Hadebe
30. Simphiwe Donatus Bekwa
31. Ian Thina Ngubane
32. Nokuthula Yolenda Young
33. Zanele Isabella Hlatshwayo
34. Mosie Antony Cele
35. Winile Prudence Zondi
36. Lindokuhle Welcome Sabelo Ngubane
37. Regina Lindiwe Mjwara
38. Important Samson Mkhize
39. Phindile Gladys Strydom
40. Diana Gloria Hoorzuk
41. Nkosinathi Phiwayinkosi Nhleko

=== Limpopo ===
1. Nkhensani Kate Bilankulu
2. Jacob Boy Mamabolo
3. Masefako Clarah Dikgale
4. Tshilidzi Thomas Gumbu
5. John Hlengani Bilankulu
6. Raesibe Martha Moatshe
7. Carol Mokgadi Phiri
8. Patamedi Ronald Moroatshehla
9. Matodzi Mirriam Ramadwa
10. Mosa Steve Chabane
11. Marubini Lourane Lubengo
12. Albert Mammoga Seabi
13. Boitumelo Maluleke
14. Nhlagongwe Patricia Mahlo
15. Jerome Joseph Maake
16. Gumani Tania Mukwevho
17. Madipoane Refiloe Moremadi Mothapo
18. Mankwana Christinah Mohale
19. Mantile Judy Mphelane

=== Mpumalanga ===
1. Gijimani Jim Skosana
2. Timothy Victor Mashele
3. Elvis Kholwana Siwela
4. Grace Kekulu Tseke
5. Lusizo Sharon Makhubela-Mashele
6. Thabile Sylvia Masondo
7. Valentia Thokozile Malinga
8. Simanga Happy Mbuyane
9. Altia Sthembile Hlongo
10. Elphus Fani Mathebula
11. Dorries Eunice Dlakude
12. Vuyisile Promise Malomane
13. Magretha Veldman
14. Leah Martha Mabuza
15. Papana Jacob Phala

=== North West ===
1. Itiseng Kenneth Morolong
2. Mohlopi Phillemon Mapulane
3. Nombuyiselo Gladys Adoons
4. Jane Manganye
5. Lesiba Ezekiel Molala
6. Tidimalo Innocentia Legwase
7. Mathedi Asnath Molekwa
8. Keitumetse Bridgette Tlhomelang
9. Sibusiso Macdonald Kula
10. Gabriel Nare Nkgweng
11. Fikile Caswell Mahlophe
12. Moithoesi Rosy Dassie
13. Thamsanqa Simon China Dodovu

=== Northern Cape ===
1. Mirriam Thenjiwe Kibi
2. Dikgang Mathews Stock
3. Ntaoleng Patricia Peacock
4. Moses Lebona Moalosi
5. Kenalemang Eunice Bojosi

=== Western Cape ===
1. Hisamodien Mohamed
2. Faiez Jacobs
3. Khayalethu Elvis Magaxa
4. Qubudile Richard Dyantyi
5. Kenneth Leonard Jacobs
6. Bheki Mathews Hadebe
7. Siphokuhle Patrein
8. Maurencia Natalie Gillion
9. Linda Nellie Moss
10. Sharon Winona Davids
11. Ellen Prins
12. Tozama Nomsa Bevu
13. Andrew Frans Madella
14. Ronalda Schivonne Nalumango
15. Mcebisi Livingstone Mnconywa
16. Mathilda Michelle Bains
17. Jonton Snyman
18. Zoleka Iris Moon
19. Thembinkosi Bethwell Tebele
20. Mandisa Octovia Matshoba
21. Victor Nkosinathi Mfusi
22. Ntombende Joselinah Landingwe
23. John Williams Schuurman

== Democratic Alliance ==
=== National ===
1. Mmusi Aloysias Maimane (Leader of the Opposition)
2. Willem Frederik Faber
3. Evelyn Rayne Wilson
4. Joseph Job McGluwa
5. Hendrik Christiaan Crafford Krüger
6. Semakaleng Patricia Kopane
7. Andrew Grant Whitfield
8. John Henry Steenhuisen
9. Geordin Gwyn Hill-Lewis
10. Thomas Charles Ravenscroft Walters
11. Natasha Wendy Anita Mazzone
12. Mimmy Martha Gondwe
13. Haseenabanu Ismail
14. Erik Johannes Marais
15. Luyolo Mphithi
16. Nceba Ephraim Hinana
17. Michael Waters
18. Phumzile Thelma Karlsen
19. Mergan Chetty
20. Noko Phineas Masipa
21. Glynnis Breytenbach
22. James Selfe
23. Gwen Sinethemba Amanda Ngwenya
24. Thandeka Moloko Mbabama
25. Denis Joseph
26. Gregory Rudy Krumbock
27. Ashor Nick Sarupen
28. Michael John Cardo
29. Jacques Warren William Julius
30. Maliyakhe Lymon Shelembe
31. Kevin John Mileham
32. Siviwe Gwarube
33. Cilliers Brink
34. Dianne Kohler
35. Christian Hans Heinrich Hunsinger
36. Thamsanqa Bhekokwakhe Mabhena
37. Veronica Van Dyk
38. Mmoba Solomon Malatsi
39. Leonard Jones Basson
40. Mandlenkosi Sicelo Mabika
41. Annerie Maria Magdalena Weber
42. Nomsa Innocencia Tarabella Marchesi
43. Chantel Valencia King
44. Mohammed Haniff Hoosen
45. Michéle Odette Clarke
46. Tandi Gloria Mpambo-Sibhukwana
47. Gertson Dipolelo Kameta
48. Anele Mngadi
49. Dirk Jan Stubbe
50. Désirée Van Der Walt
51. Cheryl Phillips
52. Thembisile Angel Khanyile
53. Annelie Lotriet
54. Baxolile Babongile Nodada
55. Hlanganani Siphelele Gumbi
56. Ghaleb Kaene Yusuf Cachalia
57. Sarel Jacobus Francois Marais
58. Bridget Staff Masango
59. Ockert Stefanus Terblanche
60. Mathew John Cuthbert
61. David William Bryant
62. Nazley Khan Sharif
63. Dirk Kotzé
64. Evert Phillipus Du Plessis
65. Nicholas Georg Myburgh
66. Cameron Mackenzie
67. Pieter Van Dalen
68. Darren Bergman
69. Jessica Elizabeth Shelver
70. Dean William Macpherson
71. Madeleine Bertine Hicklin
72. Chumani Kobeni
73. James Robert Bourne Lorimer
74. Cayla Ann Tomšs Murray
75. Belinda Van Onselen
76. Hannah Shameema Winkler
77. Samantha Jane Graham
78. Phindile Maxiti
79. Stevens Mokgalapa
80. Conrad James Poole
81. Michael Stephen Shackleton
82. Sibongiseni Ngcobo
83. Adrian Christopher Roos
84. Cathlene Labuschagne
85. Annette Steyn
86. Manuel Simþo Franca De Freitas
87. Katherine Alexandra Christie
88. Robert Alfred Lees
89. Tsepo Winston Mhlongo
90. Peter George Helfrich
91. Dennis Richard Ryder
92. Mario André Wessels
93. Leander Kruger
94. Santosh Vinita Kalyan
95. Wildri Dennis Peach
96. Catharina Susanna Abell
97. Werner Horn
98. Hendrik Cornelus Schmidt
99. Brendan Van Der Merwe
100. Kishore Badal
101. Craig Robert Winston Millar
102. Sandile Sydney Booysen
103. Ross Kriel Purdon
104. Caleb Edward Finn
105. Linda Landu
106. Tania Lynette Campbell
107. Farhat Essack
108. Rainey Thamie Hugo
109. Yao-Heng Sun
110. Edwin Victor Baptie
111. Nicolaas Salmon Louw
112. Gerhard Jacobus Niemand
113. Malcolm John Figg
114. George Michalakis
115. Fabian Kevin Ah-Sing
116. Nonhlanhla Sifumba
117. André Beetge
118. Natashya Kristanna Pillay
119. Malanie Haggard
120. Isaac Sello Seitlholo
121. Bongani Nkomo
122. Imelda Joan Beswick
123. Terri Stander
124. Shane Maas
125. Pieter Adriaan Rautenbach
126. Bradley Singh
127. Tsholofelo Katlego Motshidi
128. Vuyokazi Matanzima
129. Martin Anton Louw
130. Arlene Adams
131. Sithembiso Ngema
132. Ciska Jordaan
133. Nhuyani Edward Nxangani
134. Tandeka Gqada
135. Renaldo Gouws
136. Mbulelo Richmond Bara
137. Mariette Pittaway
138. Archibold Mzuvukile Figlan
139. Dikeledi Selowa
140. Christiaan Frederik Beyers Smit
141. Thulani Dasa
142. Sibusiso Raymond Nkosi
143. Roger William Tobias Chance
144. Ncumisa Gloria Mahangu
145. Elmarie Linde
146. Samantha Beynon
147. Johanna Steenkamp
148. Sumaya Taliep
149. Nicola Susanna Du Plessis
150. Xolani Fikani Khubisa
151. Fazloodien Abrahams
152. Alan Ross Mcloughlin
153. Delmaine Chesley Christians
154. Aletta Theron
155. Stefanie Ueckermann
156. Leon Vusumzi Magwebu
157. Selby Nhlanhla Lucky Mshengu
158. Saliem Abersalie
159. Sebate Golden Maduana
160. Malcolm Tau Maifala
161. Daylin Gary Mitchell
162. David Christie Ross
163. Victor Penning
164. Beverley Ann Schafer
165. Shara Singh
166. Naritha Naidu
167. Bruce Reid
168. David John Maynier
169. Xabiso Nicholas Nyati
170. Dady Simon Mollo
171. Deborah Anne Schäfer
172. Annacletah Veronicah Mabika
173. Tumelo Robert Ramongalo
174. Sharna Gail Fernandez
175. Marika Elizabeth Kruger Muller
176. Geoffrey Tshibvumo
177. Deidré Maudelene Baartman
178. Dharmesh Manilal Dhaya
179. Leah Ruth Potgieter
180. Modisaotsile Lesley Mothibi
181. Isaac Mbulelo Sileku
182. Lehlohonolo Selby Thekiso
183. Syabonga Sizwe Snethemba Msweli
184. Johan Jaco Londt
185. Mpho Louisa Phalatse
186. Thapelo David Masoeu
187. Andricus Pieter Van Der Westhuizen
188. Edward Khululekile Von Bodenstein
189. Jerome Sibongiseni Majola
190. Mbulelo Nguta
191. Stanton Darell Booys
192. Garry Ramaru
193. Willem Abraham Stephanus Aucamp
194. Fanyana Fanie Nkosi
195. Ken Peter Robertson
196. Ntombi Valencia Khumalo
197. Michelle Bernadette Johnson
198. Veroncia Tselane Maseloane
199. Cleopatra Ntombikayise Radebe
200. Elsabé Oosthuysen

=== Eastern Cape ===
1. Chantel Valencia King
2. Baxolile Babongile Nodada
3. Samantha Jane Graham
4. Annette Steyn
5. Leander Kruger
6. Ross Kriel Purdon
7. Malcolm John Figg
8. Terri Stander
9. Renaldo Gouws
10. Samantha Beynon
11. Leon Vusumzi Magwebu
12. Xabiso Nicholas Nyati
13. Dharmesh Manilal Dhaya
14. Mbulelo Nguta
15. Angela Peta Jones
16. Wanda Mhobo
17. Hlomela Bucwa
18. Zamekile Ndabankulu
19. Yusuf Cassim
20. Retief Odendaal
21. Jacobus Petrus Johannes Botha
22. Marshall Roberto Von Buchenroder
23. Mlindi Advent Nhanha
24. Anna Maria Du Plessis
25. Rano Conrad Kayser
26. Tommy Faltain
27. Estelle Dell
28. Louisa Stella Cilliers
29. Armand Saunders
30. Lee-Ann Ntombenhle Sheltox
31. Elmarie Estie Botha
32. Dominic Christo Prince
33. Rajeshree Ambaram
34. Vianca Swart
35. Wessel Johannes Oosthuizen
36. Mishkah Leppan
37. Bredine Share
38. Lauren Valentine
39. Lize Marié Van Onselen
40. Cathrine Willemse
41. Wanda Grové
42. Tenille Kelly-Anne Booth
43. Sakhekile Tukani
44. Karla Terblanche
45. Noxolo Bebeza
46. Nolwazimarry-Ann Dolo
47. Coenraad André Swart

=== Free State ===
1. Annelie Lotriet
2. Werner Horn
3. George Michalakis
4. Mariette Pittaway
5. David Christie Ross
6. Thapelo David Masoeu
7. Benhardus Jacobus Viviers
8. Igor Stefan Scheurkogel
9. Richard Anthony Chemaly
10. Phillip Arthur Maasdorp
11. Roy Jankielsohn
12. Karabo Lerato Khakhau
13. Kabelo Christopher Moreeng
14. Lerato Stefni Julia Tsolo
15. Morgan Lloyd Davies
16. Tsebo Edmor Majoro
17. Geran Roderick Summersgill
18. Sidney Edwin Leech
19. Pogisho Patrick Mholo
20. Jonas Moeketsi Makhema

=== Gauteng ===
1. Michéle Odette Clarke
2. Ghaleb Kaene Yusuf Cachalia
3. Bridget Staff Masango
4. Mathew John Cuthbert
5. Nazley Khan Sharif
6. Evert Phillipus Du Plessis
7. Cameron Mackenzie
8. Darren Bergman
9. Madeleine Bertine Hicklin
10. James Robert Bourne Lorimer
11. Belinda Van Onselen
12. Stevens Mokgalapa
13. Michael Stephen Shackleton
14. Adrian Christopher Roos
15. Manuel Simþo Franca De Freitas
16. Tsepo Winston Mhlongo
17. Dennis Richard Ryder
18. Wildri Dennis Peach
19. Hendrik Cornelus Schmidt
20. Kishore Badal
21. Caleb Edward Finn
22. Tania Lynette Campbell
23. Yao-Heng Sun
24. Gerhard Jacobus Niemand
25. Nonhlanhla Sifumba
26. Malanie Haggard
27. Bongani Nkomo
28. Shane Maas
29. Tsholofelo Katlego Motshidi
30. Martin Anton Louw
31. Nhuyani Edward Nxangani
32. Mbulelo Richmond Bara
33. Dikeledi Selowa
34. Roger William Tobias Chance
35. Elmarie Linde
36. Nicola Susanna Du Plessis
37. Alan Ross Mcloughlin
38. Stefanie Ueckermann
39. Sebate Golden Maduana
40. Malcolm Tau Maifala
41. Victor Penning
42. Bruce Reid
43. Dady Simon Mollo
44. Tumelo Robert Ramongalo
45. Marika Elizabeth Kruger Muller
46. Leah Ruth Potgieter
47. Lehlohonolo Selby Thekiso
48. Mpho Louisa Phalatse
49. Edward Khululekile Von Bodenstein
50. Garry Ramaru
51. Fanyana Fanie Nkosi
52. Ntombi Valencia Khumalo
53. Cleopatra Ntombikayise Radebe
54. Wendy Robyn Alexander
55. Sanelisiwe Sinethemba Zonke
56. Niranjenie Naggan
57. Mpho Malethakwe Mehlape-Zimu
58. Mabihana Shadrack Mkhonto
59. Florence Cheryl Roberts
60. Mokete Ishmael Motsamai
61. Nkosi Duncan Mthembu
62. Moses Nhlanhla Ntimane
63. Sylvester Tennyson Theophilus Phokoje
64. Sharon Govindasamy
65. Brendan James Levin
66. Richard Khumalo
67. Sean Kreusch
68. Peter Deon Rafferty
69. Katlego Godwill Makgaleng
70. Wayne Robert Moodaley
71. Zakhele Koos Hlabathi
72. Agatha Wilhelmina Cilliers
73. Janho Engelbrecht
74. Frederik Petrus Nel
75. Mervyn Hyman Cirota
76. Crezane Bosch
77. Katherine Louise Lorimer
78. Alan Joseph Fuchs
79. Lebogang Ludwig More
80. Nkele Molapo
81. Farrah Naidoo
82. Blanche Medalle Griffiths
83. Ashleigh Helen Le-Anne Tyler
84. Molapi Ashleigh Mamabolo
85. Goitseona Evans Bosman

=== KwaZulu-Natal ===
1. Mohammed Haniff Hoosen
2. Hlanganani Siphelele Gumbi
3. Dean William Macpherson
4. Hannah Shameema Winkler
5. Sibongiseni Ngcobo
6. Robert Alfred Lees
7. Santosh Vinita Kalyan
8. Craig Robert Winston Millar
9. Edwin Victor Baptie
10. André Beetge
11. Bradley Singh
12. Sithembiso Ngema
13. Sibusiso Raymond Nkosi
14. Xolani Fikani Khubisa
15. Selby Nhlanhla Lucky Mshengu
16. Shara Singh
17. Annacletah Veronicah Mabika
18. Syabonga Sizwe Snethemba Msweli
19. Jerome Sibongiseni Majola
20. Veroncia Tselane Maseloane
21. Thomas Zwelakhe Hadebe
22. Mbali Ntuli
23. Rishigen Viranna
24. Imran Keeka
25. Timothy James Brauteseth
26. Christopher John Pappas
27. Heinz Ulrik De Boer
28. Autrina Nomathemba Phungula
29. Mohammed Rafeek Sayedali Shah
30. Douglas Rawlins
31. Hlengiwe Precious Shozi
32. Siphesihle Lwandile Magubane
33. Shaun Ryley
34. Craig Dean Hargreaves
35. Lindokuhle Sphiwe Mntambo
36. Mzamo Billy
37. Sathasivan Govender
38. Michael John Wensley
39. Themba Abram Hlatshwako
40. Leonard Mlungisi Rector Ngcobo
41. Deandré François De Bruin
42. Jacobus Christiaan Theron
43. Sahajana Naidoo
44. Sharon Ann Buys
45. Samier Singh
46. Khonzi Edith Ndlovu-Nkosi
47. Issabel Alta De Kock
48. Solomon Momoti
49. Riona Gokool
50. Geoffrey Keith Wystan Embling
51. Thulani Sidwel Myeni
52. Jennifer Meriel Davies-Black
53. Nomalanga Hlengiwe Tembe
54. Carl Malcolm Trenor
55. Msawenkosi Patrick Mfeka
56. Nagesh Deenanath
57. Anthony Robert Waldhausen
58. Elliot Xaba
59. Romanius Bhekuyise Zulu
60. Serena Jacob
61. Christopher Stephen Laubscher
62. Philisiwe Priscilla Sefatsa
63. Mbali Nondumiso Mkhize
64. Michele Luan Poobalan
65. Evon Pillay
66. Nosicelo Pretty Madiya
67. Shamaladevi Ramdhunee
68. Wade Gareth Delagey
69. Zoë Adele Moore
70. Sanelisiwe Pretty Chebure
71. Sihle Shozi
72. Keletso Keotshepile Kekgonne Mmantwaagae Madisakwane
73. Lungelo Thembelihle Mthethwa
74. Xoliswa Mdlazi
75. Nduduzo Siphamandla Ngcobo
76. Nkanyiso Alpheus Ndlovu
77. Ningi Joyce Mdlazi
78. Liezel Fourie

=== Limpopo ===
1. Désirée van der Walt
2. Christiaan Frederik Beyers Smit
3. Geoffrey Tshibvumo
4. Willem Nicolaas Saaiman Oosthuizen
5. Solomon Masehlele Maila
6. Hermanus Frans Marx
7. Mbhazima Pule Thomas Maluleke
8. Maria Aletta Helm
9. Phindile Hani
10. Kgotola Charles Khotsa
11. Fani David Tsela
12. Isaac Thabo Makofane
13. Lesetja Matthews Ngoepe
14. Renias Hlakanang Phale
15. Hercules Petrus Louw
16. Crester Mhangwana
17. Choloane David Matsepe
18. Katlego Suzan Phala
19. Risham Maharaj
20. Johannes Jacobus Abrie
21. Nyane Bessy Jones
22. Tiny Doraine Ramathabatha Chidi
23. Andro° Hendrina Botha
24. Bianca Mocke
25. Lesiba Stephen Manamela
26. Jacobus Frederik Smalle
27. Natachia Prinsloo
28. Nakedi William Maunatlala
29. Shoshana Kendra Slabbert
30. Damien Kennedy Naidu
31. Zachariah Tlou Ngwepe
32. Jacoba Adriana Pullen
33. Cornel Grundlingh
34. Jerry Mphahlele Baloyi
35. Suzan Maletjema Ngoasheng
36. Sirgiourney Leigh Vale Buys

=== Mpumalanga ===
1. Thembisile Angel Khanyile
2. Farhat Essack
3. Ciska Jordaan
4. Naritha Naidu
5. Ken Peter Robertson
6. Daniel Foyoyo Maseko
7. Stephen Rudolf Schormann
8. Timothy Mark Denny
9. Willem Stephanus Davel
10. Johanna Luley Irene Brussow
11. Muso Ntokozo Kubheka
12. Hildegard Sonja Boshoff
13. Trudie Maria Johanna Grovä Morgan
14. Thembinkosi Justice Ngoma
15. Palesa Mobango
16. Sophia Mamy Mogola
17. Joseph Mthelekwa Sibanyoni
18. Dumisani Oupa Kubheka
19. Ndumiso Benedict Mgoza
20. Bongani Moses Dlamini
21. Emmanuel Matabane
22. Samukelo Matheu Hlatywayo
23. Bonisiwe Nonkululeko Kaletsana
24. Cedric Moses Soko
25. Thembisile Christinah Mokoena
26. Maledi Valantia Malekane
27. Sarbhera Amod-Leslie
28. Basani Sharon Rikhotso

=== North West ===
1. Cheryl Phillips
2. Isaac Sello Seitlholo
3. Johanna Steenkamp
4. Modisaotsile Lesley Mothibi
5. Jeanne Marguerite Adriaanse
6. Thabo Leonald Selepe
7. Luan Barend Snyders
8. Teko Klaas Melamu
9. Bejay Tulsee
10. Bafana Freddy Sonakile
11. Jacqueline Rachelle Theologo
12. Carin Visser
13. Mponeng Winston Rabotapi
14. Christiaan Johannes Bester
15. Christiaan Jacobus Steyl
16. Gertruida Jacoba Tullues
17. Tshepo Kabelo Thekiso
18. Stefan Terblanché
19. Mokgadi Idah Satikhe
20. Baitse Antronica Xheko
21. Puseletso Paulinah Mofokeng
22. Jan Johannes Keet
23. Batseba Nkele Mmeti
24. Tebogo Elizabeth Matthews

=== Northern Cape ===
1. Gizella Opperman
2. Willem Frederik Faber
3. Veronica Van Dyk
4. Dirk Jan Stubbe
5. Delmaine Chesley Christians
6. Willem Abraham Stephanus Aucamp
7. Joseph Julius Witbooi
8. Moses Jakkals
9. Boitumelo Maxwell Babuseng
10. Gregory Allen Grootboom

=== Western Cape ===
1. Eleanore Rochelle Jacquelene Spies
2. Benedicta Maria Van Minnen
3. Alexandra Lilian Amelia Abrahams
4. Emma Powell
5. Zakhele Njabulo Mbhele
6. Jan Naudé De Villiers
7. Michael Bagraim
8. Leon Amos Schreiber
9. Dion Travers George
10. Thembekile Richard Majola
11. Tandi Gloria Mpambo-Sibhukwana
12. Sarel Jacobus Francois Marais
13. Ockert Stefanus Terblanche
14. David William Bryant
15. Dirk Kotzé
16. Nicholas Georg Myburgh
17. Pieter Van Dalen
18. Jessica Elizabeth Shelver
19. Chumani Kobeni
20. Cayla Ann Tomšs Murray
21. Phindile Maxiti
22. Conrad James Poole
23. Cathlene Labuschagne
24. Katherine Alexandra Christie
25. Peter George Helfrich
26. Mario André Wessels
27. Catharina Susanna Abell
28. Brendan Van Der Merwe
29. Sandile Sydney Booysen
30. Linda Landu
31. Rainey Thamie Hugo
32. Nicolaas Salmon Louw
33. Fabian Kevin Ah-Sing
34. Natashya Kristanna Pillay
35. Imelda Joan Beswick
36. Pieter Adriaan Rautenbach
37. Vuyokazi Matanzima
38. Arlene Adams
39. Tandeka Gqada
40. Archibold Mzuvukile Figlan
41. Thulani Dasa
42. Ncumisa Gloria Mahangu
43. Sumaya Taliep
44. Fazloodien Abrahams
45. Aletta Theron
46. Saliem Abersalie

== Economic Freedom Fighters ==
=== National ===
1. Julius Sello Malema
2. Mogamad Nazier Paulsen
3. Ciliesta Catherine Shoana Motsepe
4. Washington Tseko Isaac Mafanya
5. Mathibe Rebecca Mohlala
6. Mothusi Kenneth Montwedi
7. Naledi Nokukhanya Chirwa
8. Vuyani Pambo
9. Thembi Portia Msane
10. Thokozani Makhosonke Langa
11. Lorato Florence Tito
12. Thilivhali Elphus Mulaudzi
13. Delisile Blessing Ngwenya
14. Khonziwe Ntokozo Fortunate Hlonyana
15. Brian Sindile Madlingozi
16. Shirley Motshegoane Mokgotho
17. Dumisani Fannie Mthenjane
18. Annacleta Mathapelo Siwisa
19. Makosini Mishack Chabangu
20. Elsabe Natasha Ntlangwini
21. Henry Andries Shembeni
22. Rosina Ntshetsana Komane
23. Khanya Ceza
24. Laetitia Heloise Arries
25. Sibonakaliso Phillip Mhlongo
26. Nelly Zanele Masombuka
27. Thabiso Simon Mofokeng
28. Phiwaba Madokwe
29. Keobakile Phanuel Babuile
30. Nontuthuzelo Mtwa
31. William Malefo
32. Lungile Angel Gabuza
33. Erick Fieldin Masuku
34. Thelma Mogabolle Boshielo
35. Maketu Freddie Ramaphakela
36. Mandisa Sibongile Mashego
37. Mlamli Alfred Makhetha
38. Bikwaphi Gladys Nkosi
39. Kweletsi Collen Shai
40. Kegomoditswe Maria Badirwang
41. Dunisani Lyborn Baloyi
42. Jacobeth Mosito
43. Happy Chris Mahambane
44. Nkagisang Poppy Koni
45. Mogoai Jeremiah Matebesi
46. Nonhlanhla Merlyn Vilakazi
47. Malibongwe Badi
48. Sadi Victoria Letshwiti
49. Zolile Rodger Xalisa
50. Primrose Nnana Bogatsu
51. Surprise Harold Kubayi
52. Veliswa Gladys Xabanisa
53. Ncedo Aubrey Njenga
54. Makhosonke Collin Mkhonza
55. Bongiwe Sikhisi
56. Mzubanzi Dambuza
57. Linda Adonis
58. Isaac Hlungwana
59. Verinah Dimakatso Mabilu
60. Vusumuzi Mathebula
61. Thembani Lucia Hlabangwani
62. Modikane Joseph Buthane
63. Portia Malefane
64. Simcelile Rubela
65. Betty Kedisaletse Diale
66. Mpusheng Given Leshabane
67. Mandisa Makesini
68. Linda Xavier Mabengwane
69. Senkgane Brunny Molefe
70. Linda Joseph Malindisa
71. Meseno Jeanett Nyokong
72. Lencel Mashidika Komane
73. Johanna Shono Xaba
74. Mampuru Makuduele Mampuru
75. Asanda Matshobeni
76. Hoffinel Ntobeng
77. Nokuthula Mlokoti
78. Christopher Themba Msibi
79. Lesiba Samuel Mothata
80. Onkarabetse Valerei Tong
81. Malesela Frans Ledwaba
82. Kholeka Mandyu
83. Maesela Godfrey Molekwa
84. Florence Malehlohonolo Makhele
85. Abednigo Vusumuzi Khoza
86. Noluthando Roselyn Majola
87. Thembinkosi Tevin Apleni
88. Zakithi Xolo
89. Leofi Phillip Leshabana
90. Khanyisile Nontsikelelo Dhlakama
91. Komaseroto Benjamin Disoloane
92. Beverley Felicity Badenhorst
93. Derrick Athur Hendrickse
94. Vanessa Christolene Booysen
95. Mncedisi Msibi
96. Dudu Mirriam James
97. Nkhensane Walter Mkhabela
98. Portia Zoleka Qotoyi
99. Sandile Patrick Bekembo
100. Thulisile Xaba
101. Bongani Dum'Sani Mbona
102. Nonhlanhla Princess Ramoroka
103. Vukani Ndlovu
104. Thembisa Njana
105. Litha Law Zibula
106. Hlayiseka Crucief Chewane
107. Brenda Tirhani Mathevula
108. Andrew Arnolds
109. Gugu Flora Mtshali
110. Nevie Aubrey Baartman
111. Rendani Munyai
112. Goitseone Godfrey Kaotsane
113. Bulelwa Beauty Dial
114. Isaiah Nhlanhla Khoza
115. Poppy Raisibe Mailola
116. Zukisa Moses Xegwana
117. Constance Nonhlanhla Mkhonto
118. John Lesetja Lekgothoane
119. Evodia Mathebula
120. Kgomotso Comfort Assegaai
121. Molebogeng Sharon Letlape
122. Matshidiso Mathews Botswe
123. Thandeka Precious Shabalala
124. Khomotjo Stanley Komape
125. Nomhle Ngcobo
126. Xolani Peterson Tshetu
127. Ellen Keitumetse Makhene
128. Kamogelo Jarius Itumeleng
129. Kelebogile Phillipine Molefe
130. Mmeli Julius Mdluli
131. Khathutshelo Masindi
132. Melikhaya Xego
133. Lethabo Lucy Kgomo
134. Luthando Amos
135. Phindiwe Sogayise
136. Nompumelelo Simango
137. Bernard Daniel Joseph
138. Sixolisa Gcilishe
139. Khumbulani Langa
140. Kolikie Madikedike Serane
141. Lisolomzi Ebenizer Mfutwana
142. Slindokuhle Ignatia Njapha
143. Moletsane Simon Moletsane
144. Keorapetse Komane
145. Rogers Aobakwe Mongale
146. Adelina Pulane Moloi
147. Kgotso Zachariah Morapela
148. Fiona Lebogang Manamela
149. Bonginkosi Gift Khanyile
150. Thendo Nemudzivhadi
151. Azwiambwi Gerson Tshitangano
152. Koketso Maria Sekele
153. Mduduzi Lethukuthula Mthethwa
154. Zoleka Mahambehlala
155. Michael Collen Sedibe
156. Refiloe Mohlomi
157. Mpho Joseph Ramatlama
158. More Nancy Mogaki
159. Lacia Molaoli
160. Mmatshengoane Mahero Sekgala
161. Ntombizethu Cordelia Peter
162. Sabelo Selby Hlophe
163. Tumelo Mpho Mlangeni
164. Sifiso Henry Mthethwa
165. Moleke Reuben Senong
166. Shadrack Lapologang Tlhaole
167. Vuyelwa Mnyatheli
168. Catherine Lindiwe Dzimba
169. Nthabiseng Violet Mataboge
170. Sarah Maluleke
171. Ruth Baloibotlhe Masemola
172. Nonhlanhla Pretty Radebe
173. Mapule Lizah Phooko
174. Malehoana Belinda Shikoane
175. Phuti Shirley Phaka
176. Mokgaetji Carol Mafagane

=== Eastern Cape ===
1. Ntombovuyo Veronica Mente
2. Nthako Sam Matiase
3. Nokulunga Primrose Sonti
4. Patrick Sindane
5. Yoliswa Nomampondomise Yako
6. Mgcini Tshwaku
7. Sophie Suzan Thembekwayo
8. Pebane George Moteka
9. Nontando Judith Nolutshungu
10. Phuti Peter Keetse
11. Mmabatho Olive Mokause
12. Madimetja Lorence Matsetela
13. Makoti Sibongile Khawula
14. Mogamad Nazier Paulsen

=== Free State ===
1. Hlengiwe Octavia Mkhaliphi
2. Godrich Ahmed Gardee
3. Leigh-Ann Mathys
4. Mbuyiseni Quintin Ndlozi
5. Ngwanamakwetle Reneiloe Mashabela
6. Marshall Mzingisi Dlamini
7. Tebogo Josephine Mokwele
8. Lehlohonolo Goodwill Mokoena

=== Gauteng ===
1. Nokulunga Primrose Sonti
2. Patrick Sindane
3. Yoliswa Nomampondomise Yako
4. Mgcini Tshwaku
5. Sophie Suzan Thembekwayo
6. Pebane George Moteka
7. Nontando Judith Nolutshungu
8. Phuti Peter Keetse
9. Mmabatho Olive Mokause
10. Madimetja Lorence Matsetela
11. Makoti Sibongile Khawula
12. Mogamad Nazier Paulsen
13. Ciliesta Catherine Shoana Motsepe
14. Washington Tseko Isaac Mafanya
15. Mathibe Rebecca Mohlala
16. Mothusi Kenneth Montwedi
17. Naledi Nokukhanya Chirwa
18. Vuyani Pambo
19. Thembi Portia Msane
20. Thokozani Makhosonke Langa
21. Lorato Florence Tito
22. Thilivhali Elphus Mulaudzi
23. Delisile Blessing Ngwenya
24. Linda Godfrey Seja
25. Khonziwe Ntokozo Fortunate Hlonyana
26. Brian Sindile Madlingozi
27. Shirley Motshegoane Mokgotho
28. Dumisani Fannie Mthenjane
29. Annacleta Mathapelo Siwisa
30. Makosini Mishack Chabangu
31. Elsabe Natasha Ntlangwini
32. Henry Andries Shembeni
33. Rosina Ntshetsana Komane
34. Khanya Ceza
35. Laetitia Heloise Arries

=== KwaZulu-Natal ===
1. Phuti Peter Keetse
2. Mmabatho Olive Mokause
3. Madimetja Lorence Matsetela
4. Makoti Sibongile Khawula
5. Mogamad Nazier Paulsen
6. Ciliesta Catherine Shoana Motsepe
7. Washington Tseko Isaac Mafanya
8. Mathibe Rebecca Mohlala
9. Mothusi Kenneth Montwedi
10. Naledi Nokukhanya Chirwa
11. Vuyani Pambo
12. Thembi Portia Msane
13. Thokozani Makhosonke Langa
14. Lorato Florence Tito
15. Thilivhali Elphus Mulaudzi
16. Delisile Blessing Ngwenya
17. Linda Godfrey Seja
18. Khonziwe Ntokozo Fortunate Hlonyana
19. Brian Sindile Madlingozi
20. Shirley Motshegoane Mokgotho
21. Dumisani Fannie Mthenjane

=== Limpopo ===
1. Marshall Mzingisi Dlamini
2. Tebogo Josephine Mokwele
3. Lehlohonolo Goodwill Mokoena
4. Ntombovuyo Veronica Mente
5. Nthako Sam Matiase
6. Nokulunga Primrose Sonti
7. Patrick Sindane
8. Yoliswa Nomampondomise Yako
9. Mgcini Tshwaku
10. Sophie Suzan Thembekwayo
11. Pebane George Moteka

=== Mpumalanga ===
1. Mbuyiseni Quintin Ndlozi
2. Ngwanamakwetle Reneiloe Mashabela
3. Marshall Mzingisi Dlamini
4. Tebogo Josephine Mokwele
5. Lehlohonolo Goodwill Mokoena
6. Ntombovuyo Veronica Mente
7. Nthako Sam Matiase
8. Nokulunga Primrose Sonti
9. Patrick Sindane

=== North West ===
1. Godrich Ahmed Gardee
2. Leigh-Ann Mathys
3. Mbuyiseni Quintin Ndlozi
4. Ngwanamakwetle Reneiloe Mashabela
5. Marshall Mzingisi Dlamini
6. Tebogo Josephine Mokwele
7. Lehlohonolo Goodwill Mokoena
8. Ntombovuyo Veronica Mente
9. Nthako Sam Matiase

=== Northern Cape ===
1. Daluxolo Christopher Mpofu
2. Hlengiwe Octavia Mkhaliphi
3. Godrich Ahmed Gardee

=== Western Cape ===
1. Nyiko Floyd Shivambu
2. Daluxolo Christopher Mpofu
3. Hlengiwe Octavia Mkhaliphi
4. Godrich Ahmed Gardee
5. Leigh-Ann Mathys
6. Mbuyiseni Quintin Ndlozi
7. Ngwanamakwetle Reneiloe Mashabela
8. Marshall Mzingisi Dlamini
9. Tebogo Josephine Mokwele
10. Lehlohonolo Goodwill Mokoena
11. Ntombovuyo Veronica Mente
12. Nthako Sam Matiase
13. Nokulunga Primrose Sonti
14. Patrick Sindane
15. Yoliswa Nomampondomise Yako
16. Mgcini Tshwaku
17. Sophie Suzan Thembekwayo
18. Pebane George Moteka
19. Nontando Judith Nolutshungu
20. Phuti Peter Keetse
21. Mmabatho Olive Mokause
22. Madimetja Lorence Matsetela

== Inkatha Freedom Party ==
=== National ===
1. Mangosuthu Gatsha Buthelezi
2. Narend Singh
3. Mkhuleko Hlengwa
4. Liezl Linda Van Der Merwe
5. Zandile Majozi
6. Christian Themba Msimang
7. Bhekizizwe Nivard Luthuli
8. Jan Adriaan Esterhuizen
9. Mzomuhle Silindelo Dlamini
10. Mphendukelwa Welcome Mbatha
11. Senzeni Doreen Mtshali
12. Nkululeko Mthethwa
13. Philani Jetro Mabuyakhulu
14. Bhanumathie Haripersad
15. Gcinokuhle Phumla Punky Zulu

=== Eastern Cape ===
1. Thabo Alfred Mandila
2. Zodwa Mngqinya
3. Thembakazi Mandila
4. Fefelwethu Zanozuko Matoti
5. Thembisile Vanda
6. Phathiwe Patience Mahlikihla
7. Noludwe Palisa Aretha Wiggins
8. Vuyokazi Nobaza
9. Nomsa Florence Yola
10. Sindile Witness Nobaza
11. Bongi Jeanette Manyosi
12. Mafu Eugene Ntshobodi
13. Desmond Jacob White
14. Nolwandle Mkwane
15. Bongani Jali
16. Nokwakha Ncumisa Sidelo
17. Mpendulo Hlangabezo
18. Nozibele Bangani
19. Duduzile Daphney Groom
20. Mthabiseni Landa
21. Bonga Goduka
22. Vivienne Nosipho Matoti

=== Free State ===
1. Gideon Ndaba
2. Chekwane Moses Matla
3. Jeanet Dimakatso Nhlapo
4. Dimakatso Suzan Mokhina-Msiska
5. Liphapang Alfred Masithela
6. Dina Julia Mahlaba
7. Keketso Vinolia Mahlaba

=== Gauteng ===
1. Khethamabala Petros Sithole
2. Sibusiso Phakathi
3. Phumanazo Desmond Mchunu
4. Philani Dlomo
5. Gonothi Johannes Dhlamini
6. Oreeditse Ronel Ngale
7. Thandanani Velenkosini Shiba

=== KwaZulu-Natal ===
1. Elphas Mfakazeleni Buthelezi
2. Russel Nsikayezwe Cebekhulu
3. Xolani Ngwezi
4. Siphosethu Lindinkosi Ngcobo
5. Magdalena Duduzile Hlengwa
6. Mthokozisi Nkululeko Nxumalo
7. Faith Jabulisiwe Ntuli
8. Siyabonga Mlungisi Lawrence Duma
9. Mhlabunzima Ronald Bhengu
10. Premmilla Govender
11. Sifiso Nimrode Mlaba
12. Silindile Nokwazi Gumede
13. Princess Sebenzile Sibiya
14. Lilian Ntongolozi Masondo

=== Limpopo ===
1. Daniel Tlou
2. Matjipe Stephen Metsana
3. Nkhetheni Samson Masindi
4. Thembane Tshepo Seepe
5. Tendani Remember Tshivhula
6. Winnie Maimela
7. Wesley S'Boniso Shozi
8. Kholofelo Morudi Motene
9. Magoshi Moses Maimela

=== Mpumalanga ===
1. Wonderboy Brian Buthelezi
2. Nomsombuluko Eunice Madonsela
3. Jabulani Richard Sibiya
4. Francisca Wandy Madonsela

=== North West ===
1. Grace Nontuthuzelo Phaswana
2. Matthews Makakaoba Chuma
3. Neo Precious Matlala
4. Mbuyiswa Amos Miya
5. Mahlohonolo Brian Kgopa
6. Dikagisho Yvonne Mooki

=== Northern Cape ===
1. Thabo Alfred Mandila

=== Western Cape ===
1. Kenneth Fezile Blorie
2. Lusindiso Owen Ntoto
3. Julia Ngxukuma
4. Anthony Christopher Mitchell

== African Christian Democratic Party ==
=== National ===
1. Kenneth Raselabe Joseph Meshoe
2. Steven Nicholas Swart
3. Wayne Maxim Thring
4. Nosizwe Abada
5. Mokhethi Raymond Tlaeli
6. Jo-Ann Mary Downs
7. Keitumetse Patricia Matante
8. Grant Christopher Ronald Haskin
9. Bernice Pearl Osa
10. Mzukisi Elias Dingile
11. David Eugene Moses Joshua Baruti Ntshabele
12. Bongani Maxwell Khanyile
13. Anniruth Kissoonduth
14. Marvin Christians
15. Ivan Jardine
16. Linda Meridy Yates
17. Mongezi Mabungani
18. Kgomotso Welheminah Tisane
19. Lance Patrick Grootboom
20. Marie Elizabeth Sukers
21. Mpho Lawrence Chauke
22. Willem Meshark Van Wyk
23. Herméne Koorts
24. William Franklin Nel
25. Cheslyn Wagne Swartz
26. Lynette Delia Palm
27. Tumisho Lesiba Molokomme
28. Kamala Thomas
29. Dulton Keith Adams
30. Anna Eleonora Louw
31. Jacob Johannes Scholtz
32. Daniel Tsholofelo Sello
33. Pagiel Joshua Chetty
34. Rienus Niemand
35. Thabo Innocentia Dingile
36. Sipho Eric Manqele
37. Adam Josef Patrick Makhetha
38. Gaolatlhwe Jeremia Tshipo
39. Kingsley Lebogang Itlhopeng
40. Molefe Jonas Lebalelo
41. Joseph Collin Mathee
42. Michelé Mann
43. Louise Swan
44. Brendon Govender
45. Pule Joseph Rampai
46. Enock Tsietsi Modisakeng
47. Darryl Selwyn Lawrence
48. Ashton James Andrew Coopoosamy
49. Absalom Makhaza Sithole
50. Jane Lebogang Motlhamme
51. Dingaan Simon Rampete
52. Petrus Andreas Stefanus Strauss
53. Tambo Andrew Mokoena
54. Katali Erius Letsholo
55. Abraham David De Lange
56. Jimmy Barnard
57. Norman Mputjiki Motlhamme
58. Kenneth George Williams
59. Jan Maarman
60. Victor Emmannuele Thomas Sabbe
61. Andre Joseph Weber
62. Andrew Louis Schwartz
63. Thapelo John Thipe
64. Agnes Dineo Modise
65. Mokete Patrick Selowa
66. Robert Andreas Bender
67. Tefo Raymond Tsikang
68. Thapelo April Ntombela
69. Thomas Lennox Mathebula
70. John Phillip Arnold
71. Caroline Abigail Malgas
72. Christian Karl Peter Rohlssen
73. Veronica Matozi Nxumalo
74. Frederick Jacobus Grobler
75. Marianne Joubert
76. Antoinette Loretta Keyser
77. Tshidelelo Sylvia Makhadi
78. Petrose Mfanomncane Mazibuko
79. Isabel Anna-Marie Oosthuizen
80. Malose Class Selamolela
81. Prudence Vuyiswa Mhlongo
82. Lynette Chanelle Rafferty
83. Thabang Alfred Seokamo
84. Cornelius Christiaan Willemse
85. Norman Fana Mkhonza
86. Mariti John Mofokeng
87. Erick Kholisile Wizeman Strauss
88. Sabelo Vonqo
89. Ronald Winston Harris
90. Leticia Naidoo
91. Norman Allan Ward
92. Justino Dambi Tembe
93. Ruben Van Rooyen
94. Susanna Johanna Bromkam
95. Lionel Victor De Wee
96. Dimakatso Fridah Ramabina
97. Khutso Mokgehle
98. Brian Sibusiso Msibi
99. Mduduzi Siphiwe Mthembu
100. Cindy Brenda Sibuyi
101. Beauty Deliwe Ngwenya
102. Joseph Nukeri
103. Eunice Mmathoro Matlala
104. Dominic Xavier Thomas
105. Ann Lucia Sauls
106. Japie Van Zyl
107. Kenneth Elton Phetoe
108. Gertruida Christina Titus
109. Laurie Johannes Lesch
110. Christina Steenkamp
111. Norman Jacobus Isaaks
112. Jan Johannes De Wee
113. Charmain Desline Waterboer
114. Zondiwe Jacobus Nathan Duiker
115. Nkosinathi Bosman
116. Vusumzi Mario Lovatsha
117. Yanga Hude
118. Antonette Christelle Soetwater
119. Shadrack Mangaliso Daniels
120. Anthony Christopher Piang Sen
121. Johanna Marianne Lötter
122. Lucian Godfrey Necolas Forlee
123. Nadia Michelle Grootboom
124. Dawn Rogers
125. Themba Mark Twose Cengani
126. Mark Edward De La Peyre
127. Catherine Carol Stewart
128. Sean Braemer Bezuidenhout
129. George Sebastian
130. Richard Randall White
131. Leon Ernest Coetzee

=== Eastern Cape ===
1. Michelé Mann
2. Ludumo Kwesaba
3. Amanda Penelope Rathbone
4. Lance Patrick Grootboom
5. Luke Monwabisi Quse
6. Mark Shayne Price
7. Alain Walljee
8. Nokuzola Bazana
9. Tokozile Mavis Maqamela
10. Ntomboxolo Matwa
11. Mancoko Albert Mabena
12. Lorraine Samuel
13. John Wanner
14. Anthony Christopher Piang Sen
15. Johanna Marianne Lötter
16. Nadia Michelle Grootboom
17. Themba Mark Twose Cengani
18. Lucian Godfrey Necolas Forlee
19. Dawn Rogers
20. Mark Edward De La Peyre
21. Catherine Carol Stewart
22. Sean Braemer Bezuidenhout
23. George Sebastian
24. Richard Randall White
25. Leon Ernest Coetzee

=== Free State ===
1. Thapelo April Ntombela
2. Margarett Khunou
3. Pule Joseph Rampai
4. Geoffrey Robert Seale
5. Samuel Mahlomola Xaba
6. Johan Ligthelm Maritz
7. Matjie Xaba
8. Agnes Dineo Modise
9. Libuseng Adelice Malefane

=== Gauteng ===
1. Kenneth Raselabe Joseph Meshoe
2. Absalom Makhaza Sithole
3. Tumisho Lesiba Molokomme
4. Nosizwe Abada
5. Keitumetse Patricia Matante
6. Sifiso Maswidi Ngwenya
7. Robert Andreas Bender
8. Prudence Vuyiswa Mhlongo
9. Mariti John Mofokeng
10. Tambo Andrew Mokoena
11. Linda Meridy Yates
12. Ivan Jardine
13. Dulton Keith Adams
14. Christian Karl Peter Rohlssen
15. Brian Sibusiso Msibi
16. Brendon Govender
17. Khutso Mokgehle
18. Willem Meshark Van Wyk
19. Norman Fana Mkhonza
20. Beauty Deliwe Ngwenya
21. Dimakatso Fridah Ramabina
22. Mpho Lawrence Chauke
23. Mokhethi Raymond Tlaeli
24. Evelyn Modiba
25. Mduduzi Siphiwe Mthembu
26. Sabelo Vonqo
27. Cindy Brenda Sibuyi
28. Lynette Chanelle Rafferty
29. Cornelius Christiaan Willemse
30. Ronald Winston Harris
31. Freda Nkosi
32. Amanda Gwendeline Thinnies
33. Malose Class Selamolela
34. Jackqueline Nonhlanhla Onyekpe
35. Bernice Pearl Osa
36. Mulalo Enos Matshete
37. Msawakhe Ntika
38. Willem Stephanus Fourie
39. Eunice Mmathoro Matlala
40. Anniruth Kissoonduth
41. Cynthia Nkele Motsweni
42. Tumelo Marjorie Ratsela

=== KwaZulu-Natal ===
1. Wayne Maxim Thring
2. Sipho Eric Manqele
3. Jo-Ann Mary Downs
4. Sandra Joan Hansrajh
5. Rienus Niemand
6. Jameel Essop
7. Kamala Thomas
8. Abraham David De Lange
9. Petrose Mfanomncane Mazibuko
10. Veronica Matozi Nxumalo
11. Justino Dambi Tembe
12. John Phillip Arnold
13. Norman Allan Ward
14. Joanne Beverley Hathrill
15. Joshua Mpaxa
16. Bernard Clark Hathrill
17. Bradley Deon Francis
18. Zwelithini Jeffrey Ndlovu
19. Luke Munien
20. Melasa Malarie Isaiah
21. Govindraj Naicker
22. Ralph Christiaan Williams
23. Dennis Norman Kroutz
24. Elliot Musa Msimango
25. Fikile Juba Cina
26. Nkosingiphile Prudence Mdluli
27. Nokuthula Amanda Mthethwa
28. Nonhlahla Prudence Thwala
29. Nonhlanhla Manini Ncube
30. Nozipho Thembi Mthembu
31. Ntombikhona Ndebele
32. Siyabonga Muzi Msimango
33. Siboniso Steven Thwala
34. Sbonelo Philani Mhlongo
35. Sizakele Beauty Zwane
36. Thembelihle Nokuthula Zikali
37. Thembelihle Rose Shabangu
38. Nondumiso Nonjabulo Mthembu
39. Bhekani Michael Zwane
40. Nonhlanhla Ruth Ntuli
41. Zanele Mbali Biyela

=== Limpopo ===
1. Humbulani Baldwin Ramulifho
2. Tshilidzi Albert Nephalama
3. Thomas Lennox Mathebula
4. Kgashiane Anna Ramovha
5. Phuti Piet Choshi
6. Willie Watch Mhlongo
7. William Pring
8. Famanda Brighton Hlongwane
9. Mmboswobeni Ben Solomon Mankhili
10. Diphatse Joel Makola
11. Oupa Piet Baloyi
12. Frederick Jacobus Grobler
13. Anna Eleonora Louw
14. Mokete Patrick Selowa
15. Tshidelelo Sylvia Makhadi
16. Humbulani Edward Ramalata
17. Moloke Patrick Masha
18. Marianne Joubert
19. Isabel Anna-Marie Oosthuizen
20. Freets Ngobeni
21. Joseph Nukeri

=== Mpumalanga ===
1. Nicolaas Frans Erwe@E Coetzer
2. Imram Thabang Makama
3. Khuliso Tshinetise
4. Lindiwe Mncube
5. Geoffrey Ian Anderson
6. Jacob Johannes Scholtz
7. Petra Du Plessis
8. Jacqueline Sheilagh Strydom
9. Martha Susanna Scholtz
10. Mzamane Ezekiel Mashaba
11. Christine Perdita Baer
12. Tracy Lee Minne
13. Nelisiwe Patience Nyambi
14. Benett Sifiso Thobela

=== North West ===
1. Thabo Innocentia Dingile
2. Gaolatlhwe Jeremia Tshipo
3. Kingsley Lebogang Itlhopeng
4. Antoinette Loretta Keyser
5. Katali Erius Letsholo
6. Enock Tsietsi Modisakeng
7. Thabang Alfred Seokamo
8. Dineo Giveness Mokgothu
9. Nthabiseng Patricia Mokwena
10. Mzukisi Elias Dingile
11. Siphiwe Edward Ngcongwane
12. Thato Lloyd Mokgothu
13. Ikgopoleng Phillip Ditshipi
14. Itumeleng Flora Motepe
15. Tumelo Walter Maphiri

=== Northern Cape ===
1. Erick Kholisile Wizeman Strauss
2. Thapelo John Thipe
3. Andrew Louis Schwartz
4. Lionel Victor De Wee
5. Ruben Van Rooyen

=== Western Cape ===
1. Marie Elizabeth Sukers
2. Marvin Christians
3. William Franklin Nel
4. Lynette Delia Palm
5. Cheslyn Wagne Swartz
6. Louise Swan
7. Joseph Matthee
8. Adam Josef Patrick Makhetha
9. Darryl Selwyn Lawrence
10. Ashton James Andrew Coopoosamy
11. Jan Maarman
12. Andre Joseph Weber
13. Victor Emmannuele Thomas Sabbe
14. Pagiel Joshua Chetty
15. Kenneth George Williams
16. Jimmy Barnard
17. Paul Nicholas Gillion
18. Diedrik Arnoldus Kruger
19. Marion Lee-Ann Trout
20. Shaun Lionel Cairns
21. Ricardo Dean Bester
22. Darrel Anton Scheffers

== United Democratic Movement ==
=== National ===
1. Bantubonke Harrington Holomisa
2. Nqabayomzi Lawrence Saziso Kwankwa
3. Christobel Thandiwe Nontenja
4. Pumza Malefane
5. Rufus Vuyani Ludonga
6. Yongama Ludwe Zigebe
7. Nyaniso Hamilton Mfihlo
8. René Petronella Jonas
9. Sisa Mbeki
10. Mamogodi Benjamin Mmotla
11. Usivile Mboneli
12. Bongani Burnet Maqungwana
13. Moses Sipho Mbatha
14. Asanda Vuza
15. Siphumle Mathiso
16. Xolani Njobe
17. Bongani Petrus Phenyane
18. Ndidi Gcalangobuthi
19. Sibusiso Sangweni
20. Alvon Burnett Fortuin
21. Azwinaki Joyce Rabakali
22. Motlatso Selomo
23. Khotso Stephen Rakhunoane
24. George Soiyihabo Thukwane
25. Sylvia Nomawethu Bangani
26. Patience Noloyiso Nontenja
27. Emmanuel Phelelani Dludla
28. Sibongile Namgwezani Sithole
29. Ilene Theresa Danster
30. Mbuso Poswa
31. Ntshavheni David Ramabulana
32. Bongile Dywili
33. Boikokobetso Hlomela
34. Thandi Princess Ntshongela
35. Gubela Eric Mpofu
36. Mluleki Stanford France
37. John Majadibodu
38. Wilford Mlamleli Zaza
39. Namhla Gloria Notshaya
40. Bangile Morris Madengezana
41. Lehlohonolo Andrew Balleng
42. James Dlamini
43. Howard Mario Fortuin
44. Malehlohonolo Lebenya
45. Zwelithini Ernest Shongwe
46. Chandree Geniveve Morris
47. Jabulani Peter Sibanda
48. Goodman Lufefe Sololo
49. Edwin William Cloete
50. Rathabo Doctor Thobela
51. Polotsi Samuel Mahlabela
52. Pindile Albert Mazula
53. Samuel Matshwenyego Mualefe
54. Tintelwa Mercy Nongongo
55. Andile Michael Fololo
56. Nokuthula Ncambacha
57. Mmaditaba Shimein Seenyane
58. Tomsana Sodayisi
59. Sara Teffu
60. Lee-Roy Cloete
61. Gadifele Ellah Morua
62. Lebogang Elizabeth Nkosi
63. Mashita Lina Ngale
64. Patricia Zelda Williams
65. Tandokazi Mtengwane
66. Petrus Kekana
67. Meladine Jamarine Raman
68. Nonkwezani Eva Mabe
69. Dumisani Kabini
70. Veronica Emily Dimelu
71. German Kortman Matsimane
72. Mvuyisi Zilwa
73. Johan Sandile Kabinde
74. Maria Dineo Ahmed
75. Siyabulela Peter Lizo
76. Andile Tony Nhlapo
77. Simphiwe Charity Nhlengethwa
78. Jack Matome Legong
79. Nceba Victor Ngqwemese
80. Immaculate Nomlindelo Gasa
81. Moral Lukhele
82. Lesiba Jackson Maboate
83. Sydney Dion Sibuyi
84. Rogers Cothela
85. Lazarus Refus Mboweni
86. Giyana Eric Mbatsane
87. Lesetja Frans Mabonda
88. Mohlamunye Maria Mokonene
89. Mduduzi Nelson Mtshali
90. Mokheseng Stiphen Lebeko
91. Maswazi Patrick Mdakane
92. Mpho Patience Matsaba
93. Trevor-Giles Thabo Molatoli
94. Mapula Lucy Nhlapo
95. Dingaan Day Mokoena
96. Lindiwe Joyce Twala
97. Motsamai Johnson Mokorotlo
98. Mahume Jack Seloane
99. Thembi Pretty Radebe
100. Neo Innocent Mohlabi
101. Maleshoane Alice Mathopa

=== Eastern Cape ===
1. Lennox Bogen Gaehler
2. Mzimkulu Mpangele
3. Zamindawo Abner Mqolo
4. Busiswa Honono
5. Piloni Gladson Ndlodaka
6. Irene Nomachule Quvile
7. Mandla Hlanekela
8. Nobunto Faith Mzimane
9. Humphrey Sangolibanzi Nobongoza
10. Phila Khalipa Thingathinga
11. Masiza Maxwell Mhlati
12. Ntombezayo Slyvia Mnikina
13. Melvine Luvuyo Maneli
14. Zuzakhe Dingiswayo
15. Thelma Zoliswa Lubaxa
16. Nonzukiso Mpapama
17. Mveleli Ennoch Ngalo
18. Zilindile Mtyelwa
19. Bongani Gqokongana
20. Dalibunga Clayton Soji
21. Sonwabile Steven Rhoshinamba
22. Thembelani Bishop Zamla

=== Western Cape ===
1. Mphuthumi Ntabeni
2. Siyabulela Peter Lizo
3. Lulama Eunice Majivolo
4. Masonwabe Nqawe
5. Bonita Ngwenya
6. Tintelwa Mercy Nongongo
7. Vuyiseka Eunice Twalo
8. Tomsana Sodayisi
9. Pindile Albert Mazula
10. Andile Michael Fololo

== Freedom Front Plus ==
=== National ===
1. Petrus Johannes Groenewald
2. Wouter Wynand Wessels
3. Wynand Johannes Boshoff
4. Tamarin Wessels
5. Pieter Mey
6. Ignatius Michael Groenewald
7. Heloise Jordaan
8. Isak Petrus Du Plooy
9. Lourens Abraham Erasmus
10. Izak Johannes De Villiers
11. Jennifer Anne Glover
12. Frederika Roets Botha-Rossouw
13. Isabelle De Taillefer
14. Daniel Johannes Coetzee
15. Jacob Petrus Prins
16. Lourens Lemmer Bosman
17. Stephanus Franszouis Du Toit
18. Marlene Du Toit
19. De Wet Nel
20. Jean Kriek
21. Ella Dorothea Fredrika Lourens
22. Matthys Jacobus Van Tonder
23. Timotheus Francois Potgieter
24. Gertruida Magrieta Senekal
25. Jurgens Johannes Pieterse
26. Gert Johannes Van Niekerk
27. Johannes Hartnick
28. Christo Peyper
29. Johan Dietlof Aegidius Blignaut
30. Westley John Barnard
31. Charl Van Der Westhuizen
32. Theodorus Ernst Joubert
33. Erns Lodewukis Kleynhans
34. Johannes Marthinus Otto
35. Johannes Francois Schutte
36. Jefrey Van Wyk
37. Johan Van Drimmelen
38. Dorothea Maria Blignaut
39. William James Markram
40. Percy Henry Booth
41. Hendrik Frans Cornelius Jordaan
42. Jacobus Johannes Hoffman
43. Theo Du Toit
44. Albertha Hendrika Viljoen
45. Duncan Leslie Du Bois
46. Theo Willem Coetzee
47. Walter August Christoph Herfurth
48. Elizabeth Judith Geyser
49. Nicolaas Johannes Ryke
50. Pieter Daniel Uys
51. Naomi Nel
52. Stephanus Petrus Kloppers
53. Cornelius Petrus Hattingh
54. Marcelle Frieda Maritz
55. Rochelle Robbetze
56. Diederik Philippus Niemand
57. Hermann Alfred Goldschagg
58. Willem Adriaan Van Dyk
59. Amanda De Lange
60. Paulette Lucille Stammer
61. Gideon Rudolph De Vries
62. Kim Constance Abnett
63. Phillippus Arnoldus Du Plessis
64. Sidney Anolik
65. Nicolaas Willem Stapelberg
66. Petronella Natalia Fourie
67. Carin Coetzee
68. Geoffrey Kenneth Bauer
69. Esce Eksteen
70. Aletta Catharina Bester
71. Andi Wolmarans
72. Esme Malanie Boshoff
73. Mare-Lize Wewege
74. Petrus Jakobus Breet
75. Karlien Venter-Jacobs
76. Leon Cilliers
77. Arné Venter
78. Armand Benjamin Cloete
79. Cynthia Van Staden
80. Cornelis Albertus Coetzee
81. Clifton Richard Van Reenen
82. Marelize De Bruyn
83. Johannes Marthunis Van Niekerk
84. Michiel Adriaan Petrus De Bruyn
85. Marizelle Van Niekerk
86. Franco Carel De Lange
87. Willem Roux Van Der Merwe
88. Theunis Hendrik Du Buisson
89. Phillippus Petrus Van Der Merwe
90. Chriszaan Du Plessis
91. Lizaan Van Der Merwe
92. Cornelis Johannes Du Plessis
93. Marinda Toerien
94. Leon Du Plessis
95. Susanna Dorithia Maria Taljaard
96. Joseph Erasmus De Beer Swart
97. Erica Joanne Fourie
98. Matthys Johannes Streicher
99. Hendrik Johannes Liebenberg Greyling
100. Tjaart Johannes Steenkamp
101. Jean Marlene Hattingh
102. Elizabeth Snyman-Van Deventer
103. Philippus Jacobus Cronje Janse Van Rensburg
104. Marthinus Smith
105. Hillten Janse Van Rensburg
106. Devar Smit
107. Johannes Gerhard Janse Van Rensburg
108. Joseph Abraham Sellidon
109. Annamarie Elizabeth Jordaan
110. Andre Rossouw
111. Johann Hendrik Jordaan
112. Desmond Reed
113. Monique Rautenbach
114. Inalia Dorothea Louw
115. Isak Hermanus Coenraad Johannes Prinsloo
116. Granville Cameron Martin
117. Jacob Jacobus Prins
118. Jacobus Adriaan Pienaar
119. Helena Maria Catharina Muller
120. Sandra Oost
121. Charl Francois Naude
122. Jan Oost
123. Susanna Chatrina Elizabeth Naude
124. Euné Carla Oelofsen
125. Magdalena Petronella Bergh
126. Werner Ludolf Weber
127. Petrus Paulus Bergh
128. Michelle Rademeyer
129. Sunette Bezuidenhout
130. Nicolaas Johannes Stephanus Viljoen
131. Nicolaas Christiaan Jacobus Verster
132. Anna Elizabeth Breedt
133. Roderick Charles Vencencie
134. Herman Willem Breedt
135. Pieter Du Plessis Swart
136. Ockert Brits
137. Jacob Pieter Van Den Berg
138. Maric Chantelle Du Toit
139. Maria Magdalena Terblanche
140. Tjaart Johannes Chambers
141. Hendrik Jurgens Van Rooyen
142. Cornelia Magrietha Aletta Van Rooyen
143. Emile Clifford Coetzee
144. Frederik Jacobus Van Eeden
145. Denice Baranice Daniels
146. Dirk Marthinus Lamprecht
147. Frederik Jacobus Cornelius De Beer
148. Heinrich Van Der Lith
149. Shelley Desireé De Freitas
150. Wilhelmus Gerhardus Van Der Linde
151. Karin De Villiers
152. Barend Van Der Berg
153. John Henry Denner
154. Trevor Vincent Trout
155. Karien De Bruyn
156. Brent Storm-Alexander Thompson
157. Jolize Du Plessis
158. Ruhan Swanepoel
159. Zander Du Toit
160. Anna Johanna Steyn
161. Nicolaas Stephanus Matheus Muller
162. Judith Susanna Hendrika Stanbridge
163. Johannes Petrus Duvenage
164. Gavin Ashton Stanbridge
165. Maryna Susara Duvenage
166. Hendrik Christiaan Smith
167. Johann André Engelbrecht
168. Wiebe Schultz
169. William Frederick Eyre
170. Dirk Rossouw
171. Jacobus Johannes Geyser
172. Francis Johannes Robbetze
173. Gerhardus Stephanus Gouws
174. Pieter Cornelius Snyman
175. Elizabeth Johanna Gouws
176. Cornelius Gregorius Pypers
177. Johnathan Crooks Haarhoff
178. Anushka Oosthuizen
179. Maria Cornelia Heymans
180. Robert Henry Nelson
181. Adriaan Du Plessis Jordaan
182. Wilhelmina Petronella Kotze
183. Karin Kemp
184. Lionel John Meyer
185. Michelle Irene Kleynhans
186. Ivan Kortje
187. Juanette Mentz
188. Johannes Hendrik Du Rand Kukkuk
189. Catharina Johanna Janse Van Rensburg
190. Heleen Kukkuk
191. Frederick Johannes Lotz
192. Amelia Marais
193. George Stephanus Malherbe
194. Geraldine Marais
195. Willem Jacobus Louw
196. Hanli Feuth
197. Valerie Rose Van Wyk

=== Gauteng ===
1. Philippus Adriaan Van Staden
2. Frederik Jacobus Mulder
3. Gertruida Magrieta Senekal
4. Amanda De Lange
5. Jacobus Johannes Hoffman
6. Jennifer Anne Glover
7. Lourens Abraham Erasmus
8. Isak Petrus Du Plooy
9. Jean Kriek
10. Johan Van Drimmelen
11. Pieter Daniel Uys
12. Cornelius Petrus Hattingh
13. Charl Van Der Westhuizen
14. Sidney Anolik
15. Franco Carel De Lange
16. Tjaart Johannes Steenkamp
17. Hillten Janse Van Rensburg
18. Marinda Toerien
19. Isak Hermanus Coenraad Johannes Prinsloo
20. Susanna Chatrina Elizabeth Naude
21. Karin Kemp
22. Willem Roux Van Der Merwe

=== Western Cape ===
1. Cornelius Petrus Mulder
2. Frederika Roets Botha-Rossouw
3. Jacob Petrus Prins
4. Jurgens Johannes Pieterse
5. Gert Johannes Van Niekerk
6. Johannes Hartnick
7. Jefrey Van Wyk
8. Walter August Christoph Herfurth
9. Nicolaas Johannes Ryke
10. Naomi Nel
11. Paulette Lucille Stammer
12. Kim Constance Abnett
13. Phillippus Arnoldus Du Plessis

== African Transformation Movement ==
=== National ===
1. Vuyolwethu Zungula
2. Thandiswa Linnen Marawu
3. Mncedisi Hillel Yusof Zungula
4. Malefetsane Aubrey Katsana
5. Mandlenkosi Nelson Mandisi Sigcau
6. Nomagubevu Emma Mbali
7. Khutala Nokwali
8. Bhekinhlahla Jeremia Mnyandu
9. Zoleka Elizabeth Madikazi
10. Mayibongwe Nongqunga
11. Ntombiyabo Doris Mpahleni
12. Nomvula Glenrose Sidu
13. Melikhaya Melphin Qotoyi
14. Mzwanele Jimmy Manyi
15. Nonhlanhla Athelida Keswa
16. Sibongile Lucia Sambo
17. Nicco Nkhwashu
18. Deborah Gwendoline Conlon
19. Gcobani Wesley Ntobongwana
20. Nosisa Mayaba
21. Nolwazi Snolwazi Ndabankulu
22. Mxolisi Makhubo
23. Lindelwa Mashalaba
24. Christopher Bernard Mashigo
25. Yolande Mafuya
26. Paul Wiseman Mambane
27. Msawenkosi Xinwa
28. Zukile Luyenge
29. Mandla Stanley Mokoena
30. Bongani Ndonga
31. Maphoto Bernadette Mosala
32. Sibusiso Patrick Mohlala
33. Mluleki Osborn Nongqunga
34. Phumzile Victor Gabada
35. Michael Tando Ntonga
36. Luyanda Khaboyise Msipha
37. Thandeka Temperance Thabi
38. Mawande Firstborn Nokwali
39. Lizo Hubert Makele
40. Velani Baldwin Mzobe
41. Muzonjani Zacharia Zulu
42. Thomas Edgar Brown
43. Alwyn Rico Jacobs
44. Andile Meshack Mayekiso
45. Petrus Ndaba
46. Agent Stephen Mthombeni
47. Fikile Eunice Khuzwayo
48. Joel Mahlangu Sekhobela
49. Dumisani Victor Mthembu
50. Buyani Maxwell Mnguni
51. Bongani Walter Mvula
52. Erica Bulelwa Mapuma
53. Celebration Ntungwa
54. Jane Nomsa Gumbi
55. Lydia Gabaikangwe Mdlolose
56. Mncedi Ndzwanana
57. Goodenough Happie Xaba
58. Elma Margaret Du Plessis
59. Busisiwe Cynthia Moloi
60. Nontando Claudia Mwanda
61. Clement Bongani Mvuyana
62. Gugulethu Mampofu
63. Siphokazi Magaqa
64. Enos Mongameli Mbanga
65. Mzwandile Maxwell Maraqana
66. Nomapelo Veronica Nodwengu
67. Timothy Bhekie Ngcobo
68. Thiagarajh Perumal
69. Nduza Paulus Tshezi
70. Zamindawo David Solontsi
71. Bongile Tallman Ngqasa
72. Cyntaeche Cacelwa Mashumi
73. Nosipho Rose Nodwengu
74. Mvuyo Alfred Rondo
75. Zama Bomela
76. Portia Ntombizodwa Madisha
77. Agnes Daphne Noluthando Qikani
78. Lungile Zanele Msimanga
79. Mandisa Fezeka Phakathi
80. Zoliswa Sikwehle
81. Leonard Makalima Mjokovane
82. Jappie Pitso Mahlaba
83. Lindimpi Phineas Mhlanga
84. Thokozile Jessey Keiso
85. Zolani Oscar Mkhonde
86. Segeshe Judas Malepe
87. Nomalungelo Victoria Mnqantsa
88. Zongamele Baliso
89. Vuyelwa Mxokozeli
90. Joyce Ndileka Gabela
91. Contantia Ntombizamabhele Mvula
92. Lulamile Zanemvula Gxara
93. Veronica Mamobishopo Nkxoyi
94. Ria Siphokazi Mfumba
95. Lindela Errol Tshwete
96. Nomakhaya Mavis Mdaka
97. Rosy Kamtala
98. Tenjiwe Ngayo
99. Leon Landingwe Rozani
100. Abel Mofokeng
101. Thobela Todd Ntsepo
102. Happy Vuyile Mampofu
103. Sebasteen Themba Sipho Mvula
104. Pule Azariel Moloko
105. Ntokozo Christopher Kheswa
106. Gloria Pamela Sithole
107. Nompumelelo Reinette Smith
108. Nomzamo Antonette Mbali
109. Blessing Kunaka
110. Bismarck Mahlangu
111. Wellington Mlandeli Kumsha
112. Isaac Myalezwa Sabuka
113. Lindela Promise Makhombothi
114. Mbuzeni Vincent Majola
115. Phondlo Joseph Malangabi
116. Promise Mantombi Mvula
117. Mamiki Esther Thobela
118. Boniwe Windasi
119. Sandy Jane Phillips
120. Ronelle Chantel Martin
121. Edward George Stringer
122. Bheki Vincent Gina
123. Nomakhuze Ziwele
124. Josef Sorry Matheze
125. Martin Christopher Esau
126. Lindiwe Indcentia Bosman
127. Vuyani Jason Mpambane
128. Xolile Peter Mgweba
129. Mampheletso Lydia Nkhoke-Ntsangani
130. Nocwaka Ntungwa
131. Funeka Phephu
132. Lulama Pamela Rozani
133. Nomonde Patience Kondlo
134. Thandiwe Sokomani
135. Nkosinathi Ntlokondala
136. Mzomhle Msutu
137. Emelia Mampe Malangabi
138. Lettitia Weziwe Tsutsu
139. Esethu Ntleki
140. Tsietsi Ben Serue
141. Unathi Babalwa Mtembu
142. Mbusi Msutu
143. Nobalulekile Maureen Mampofu
144. Mavis Thandiwe Jokwana
145. Victoria Ndinentombi Siwisa
146. Sarah Sibongile Mngwengwe
147. Nozipho Hazel Mkhize
148. Lindiwe Patience Mkhize
149. Thulani Xoki
150. Nkosimathi Ben Nkosi
151. Themba Wiseman Khanyile
152. Zama Pan-Ann Luthuli
153. Ntsundukazi Latrivietta Ngalwa
154. Novulikhaya Fazi
155. Phumza Nongqunga
156. Wandisile Makhuluphala
157. Nomnikelo Betty Rulumeni
158. Tholang Molefe
159. Patronella Noncedo Gazula
160. Lungelo Gladman Luthuli
161. Thulani Daniel Kwatsha
162. Veronica Veliswa Makaula
163. Ntokozo Bhekithemba Khuzwayo
164. Themba Freddy Mbutho
165. Bongani Ngubane
166. Johannes Seuntjie Malanga
167. Makerefesi Bessie Rondo
168. Lusanda Thembeka Tiya
169. Fundiswa Vivian Dingiswayo
170. Keiso Petrus Keiso
171. Ntombizanele Joyce Mzongwana
172. Khalipha Ntungwa
173. Mphangeli Johannes Waka
174. Thembekile Saphronia Nzimande
175. Nhlakanipho S'Thembiso Mngadi
176. Benny Obed Masondo
177. Joel Mntwabantu Matshoba
178. Mlamli Sangqu
179. Rowan Jikwana
180. Pelisa Mkalali
181. Nomsa Winnie Mnyatheli
182. Primrose Poliswa Makiwane
183. Daluxolo Myeki
184. Zolile Harrison Mothutsi
185. Nelisiwe Senzeni Nhlenyama
186. Siphiwo Vincent Galadla
187. Panamandla Hlumelo Matola
188. Dawid Johannes Jurens
189. Mondli Ovid Magadla
190. Zwelixolile Cyprian Njomi
191. Nozuko Lillian Xhalabile
192. Mbulelo Wiseman Ntenjwa
193. Nobayethe Mboni
194. Sibabalwe Nongqunga

== Good ==
=== National ===
1. Patricia de Lille
2. Shaun Nigel August
3. Willem Petrus Oliphant
4. Brett Norton Herron
5. Nthabiseng Diana Lephoko
6. Roger Freddy Solomons
7. Welheminah Masego Kwenamore
8. Daniel Albertus Van Wyk
9. Mark William Rountree
10. Vivien Frances Laverge
11. Evert Benhardus Manuel
12. Bazil Petrus
13. Mohlouwa Benjamine Mothibe
14. Christie Deon Noble
15. Charity Wendy Nare
16. Celeste Lynn Domingo
17. Marius John Gysman
18. Cameron Johan Arendse
19. Vincent Tebogo Metswamere
20. Mashudu Maxwell Mbuwe
21. Patrick John Ubisse
22. Trudy Beatrice Ruiters
23. Earl Jose Denves Pearce
24. Mohamed Shareef Rosen
25. Brain Harold Mervin Visser
26. Vusumuzi Henry Chauke
27. Marilyn Jaars
28. Hubert Clement Titus
29. Armstrong Bongani Mdagane
30. Samuel Shabane
31. Raletjatji Karel Mogashoa
32. Ulinda Porshia Lotz
33. Lulama Benge
34. Matsatsi Nomalanga Msiza
35. Yandisa Tshotwana
36. Boniswa Beryl Siluma
37. Ngokoana Reginah Mahlangu
38. Elizabeth Bridgette Sehlapelo
39. Edgar Gerades Arendse
40. Charmaine Kroats
41. Luvuyo Nyameko Madikane
42. Qiniso Mazwi Ndlovu
43. Nkanyiso Marcus Cele
44. Leovaljo Josephine Simpson
45. Thato Jeffrey Rakgomo
46. Herman Gerrit Joseph Kordom
47. Simon Nkosi
48. Vaughan Sheldon Villet
49. Ursula Astolene Adams
50. Zandré Carl Allen
51. Adele Noreen Campbell
52. Katherine Ann Carollisen
53. Nicolin Peter Crouwcamp
54. Florence Daniels
55. Nontuthuko Ngcobo
56. Inatia Ilona Padayachee
57. Anusha Bansi
58. Ziyanda Zibuyile Sithole
59. Siyabonga Alfred Mkhungo
60. Johannes Daniel Jacobs
61. Morgan Victor Jacobs
62. Ashwin Ashley Johnson
63. Cantona Cyril Matthews
64. Puleng Bridget Mpokotho
65. Shayne Adrienne Ramsay
66. Simon Buta Qwina
67. Delmarie Elouise Solomons
68. Bhekuyise Eric Mkhize
69. Robin Somiah Naidoo
70. Brandon Pat Jassen
71. Thanduxolo Sanele Mshengu
72. Jennet Shazi
73. Keith William Joseph Nelson
74. Bronwyn Hillary Nel
75. Portia Carmen Reid
76. Janine Tracey Jane Murison
77. Lunga Masakazi
78. Elroy Ward
79. Earl Frank Pillay
80. Elwin Eugene Koopman
81. Gavin Veleden Valayden
82. Kurt Anton Tobias
83. Navane Luciano Leslie
84. Ronaldo Hazron Van Niekerk
85. Moegamat Ayub Abrahams
86. Given Junior Masase
87. Lehlohonolo John Hoeane
88. Bongile Isaac Mangezi
89. Noleleni David Motaung
90. Thabiso Setseakobo Walter Mphahlele
91. Oscar Given Moropane
92. Doctor Rodney Shabangu
93. Sibusiso Kambule
94. Nhlanhla Rudy Shezi
95. Leboya Petrus Motaung
96. Veronica Sharon Wagenstroom
97. Benjamin Charles Titus
98. Audry Felicity Barrath
99. Anne Du Plessis
100. Sue-Anne Villet
101. Mary Bernadette Pinches
102. Roderick Roger Assam
103. Stuart Alan Siljeur
104. Daniël Oliphant
105. Angus Rupert Schovell
106. David Joseph Brooks
107. Garth Ian Jones
108. Alastair Duncan Rowan
109. Leon Keith Lee
110. Andrew Tyrone Barry
111. Thulani Sokhela
112. Lungile Noluthando Khambule
113. Nokuthula Sylvia Mndaweni
114. Tresa Shafiq
115. Ethienne Alton De Jager
116. Sphiwe Bembe
117. Ayanda Sinothile Biyela
118. Poovendran Padayachee
119. Patience Mbali Cele
120. Ideleen Chetty
121. Lutchamee Chetty
122. Dhanum Chinnasamy
123. Selvie Dorasamy
124. Deshnee Dalayah
125. Abednego Dumisani Fakude
126. Phoko Herman Ratsoma
127. Mpho Philemon Thulare
128. Charles Sithole
129. Johannes Phure Cutshwa
130. Maditsie Mokhosi
131. Thandazo Lawrence Ndwene
132. Phindokuhle Tshabalala
133. Ofentse Portia Mashabela
134. Nombulelo Macia Zulu
135. Maepetlile Evelyn Rabolele
136. Thethiwe Lydia Kokozela
137. Innocent Samkelo Bali
138. Shownell Singh
139. Andries Leo Sithole
140. William Neo Kgaje
141. Moshe Tlaatla
142. Hendrina Johanna Le Roux
143. Sello Laurance Mponeng
144. Erik Harm Holm
145. Peter Thabo Kgaje
146. Mario Matshipi
147. Solomon Tshepo Mahlangu
148. Leonard Francois Mckay
149. Auburn Francios Jaftha
150. Emit Fallet
151. Masabata Daphney Molefe
152. Festus Frank Stevens
153. Randall Edward Pieters
154. Johan Shaun Swanlow
155. Kelvin Cyprian Cloete
156. Bernard Josef Sass
157. Christiana Florencia Ali
158. Parvathy Govender
159. Vuyiswa Sindi Gamede
160. Khethukuthula Wiseman Gumbi
161. Mxolisi Malusi Gabela
162. Kamenthia Narainan
163. Phangwa siseko
164. Mduduzi Thembinkosi Mkhize
165. Njabulo Samuel Mngomezulu
166. Khanyisile Truelove Mtiyane
167. Katherine Sunker
168. Yukesh Mahass
169. Pathmanandan Appasamy Moodley
170. Anesh Mahabeer Maharaj
171. Aalyia Mahomed
172. Manormonie Naidoo
173. Samuel Mazungwe Mtsweni
174. Johannah Chisiwe Bafunani Mtsweni
175. Nontsikelelo Mtolo
176. Malikgo Ntombizodwa Khanyile
177. Matthew Cook
178. Florence Lindiwe Chemane
179. Zandile Mthembu
180. Galaletsang Frida Mosimanethebe
181. Patricia Nompumelelo Mbeje
182. Petros Myeni
183. Moloko Bella Komape
184. Derick Thulani Mahlangu
185. Raphuthi Timothy Tlhone
186. Jacqueline Monyamane Baloyi
187. Sekokoane Phillip Baloyi

=== Western Cape ===
1. Patricia de Lille
2. Brett Norton Herron
3. Alistair Francis Isobell
4. Suzette Ann Little
5. Siyabulela Mamkeli
6. Rodney Benjamin Lentit
7. Bazil Petrus
8. Mark William Rountree
9. Thulani Stemele
10. Colleen Yolanda Titus

== National Freedom Party ==
=== National ===
1. Veronica Zanele Msibi
2. Ahmed Munzoor Shaik Emam
3. Jeremiah Bhekumthetho Mavundla
4. Nobahle Harriet Magqabi
5. Bhungu Mgezeni Gwala
6. Kelly Sandra Baloyi
7. Nontuthuzelo Mniki
8. Lindani Calalakhe Magwaza
9. Makhosini Master Soko
10. Shiaan-Bin Huang
11. Ramafodi Jan Mosupye
12. Simo Mziwokuphila Mkhwanazi
13. Gert Bitterbos
14. Tusokwakhe Elphas Nzuza
15. Mabutho Petrus Moloi
16. Simosakhe David Mnguni
17. Phindile Deborah Magwaza
18. Nhlanhlakayise Moses Khubisa
19. Buselaphi Irene Gxowa
20. Sonto Innocent Mabika
21. Petros Sabelo Dlamini
22. Azile Mandyebeni
23. Shaheed Noor
24. Nokuthula Joyce Gumbi
25. Silungile Buhlebakhe Dumisa
26. Skhosiphi Khethonjani Maphumulo
27. Simangele Claris Dlamini
28. Elliot Shweleza Ngcobo
29. Ricardo Charles Absalon
30. Sandra Baloyi
31. Veronica Marina Thelma Morgan
32. Nada Rietha Anta
33. Graham Clive Barnes
34. Brennan Secondo Marais
35. Petrus Andreas Fourie
36. Gertjie Billy Hendricks
37. Margareth Francina Magdalena Fortuin
38. Abraham Henry Braaf
39. Skhumbuzo Lovers Mhlanga
40. Syril Mduduzi Ntini
41. Joel Hambisani Miya
42. Tholakile Eynice Miya
43. Simon Daniel Fisher
44. Richard Anthony September
45. Abram Jacobs
46. Achmat Jacobs
47. Glynice Sheena October
48. Gail Elizabeth Hendricks-Roberts
49. Zulpha Morris
50. Karen Van Jaarsveld
51. Abdul Moeyn Sait
52. Ryno Nowellyn Serfontein
53. Keanan Van Jaarsveld
54. Marwaan Meintjies
55. Abdullah Barthus
56. Cyril Edwin Gradwell

=== KwaZulu-Natal ===
1. Christopher Howard Mzwakhe Sibisi
2. Zandile Prudence Myeni
3. Phindavele Mlungisi Sikosana
4. Erickson Mtsheneni Zungu
5. Aidhika Roy
6. Siphamandla Siyethemba Ntombela
7. Nkosingiphile Abraham Mthembu
8. Sikhumbuzo Boniface Zulu
9. Besta Ntombikayise Nkosi
10. Nomalanga Perseverance Mkhize
11. Bhekamina Samuel Gumbi
12. Ntombigcinice Shezi
13. Nicodemus Thokozani Ntshangase
14. Ziphathele Alpheos Mhlongo
15. Jabulisiwe Abigail Mpanza
16. Paul Blaza Melusi Mabele
17. Jannet Ntombifuthi Ngcobo
18. Khulekani Rodney Hlatshwayo

== African Independent Congress ==
=== National ===
1. Mandlenkosi Phillip Galo
2. Lulama Maxwell Ntshayisa
3. Steven Mahlubanzima Jafta
4. Margeret Sheron Arnolds
5. Wele Clement Mdolomba
6. Nikiwe Madikizela
7. Vuyisile Alfred Diko
8. Cindy Brenda Dube
9. Sisanda Florance Hlazo
10. Thobeka Hazel Madasi
11. Phakamile Alfred Hlomela
12. Monde Kula
13. Nkosivile Desmond Ndzipho
14. Mxolisi Jerome Koom
15. Katlego Sito
16. Cingiwe Kula
17. Mxolisi Jackson Ntobela
18. Susan Sana Gazi
19. Thomas Mvundle
20. Mthakathi Jack Malindi

== Congress of the People ==
=== National ===
1. Mosiuoa Gerard Patrick Lekota
2. William Mothipa Madisha
3. Vanita Amanda Coetzee
4. Diratsagae Alfred Kganare
5. Johanna Phuti Nomvete
6. Robert Norman Hutchinson
7. Jessica Ramsharan Panday
8. Theodore Thomas Godden
9. Siyasanga Sijadu
10. Erick Mohlapamaswi
11. Ouneas Dikgetsi
12. Deidre Carter
13. Mbali Nkosi
14. Basi Johannes Matjila
15. Nobenguni Sybil Magwaca
16. Christelle Astrid Scheepers
17. Ntsikelelo April
18. René Paige Theresa Lewis
19. Jarrod Daine Delport
20. Bukelwa Felicia Ndzule-Jacobs
21. Antonie Deon Pieterse
22. Matsholo Magdeline Legalanyana
23. Tyson Ndou
24. Elsabe Zoliswa Maqhina
25. Jonas Rammupudu Mooketsi
26. Mzwandile Nelson Bula
27. Funiwe Julia Phetlho
28. Isaac Mzwandile Hleko
29. Marilyn Saul
30. Lindile Welcome Ntshanyana
31. Shireen Bee Hemed
32. Tshepo Jacob Mnisi
33. Nosipho Portia Chele
34. Dennis Victor Bloem
35. Anna De Bruin
36. Mahummed Lowrence Khan
37. Cornelia Johanna Pretorius
38. Siyabulela Eric Simane
39. Francois Jacques-Pierre Malan
40. Nomathamsanqa Maud Gugwini-Sijadu
41. Thanduxolo Febana
42. André Engelbrecht
43. Nomthandazo Ruth Motjelele
44. Louis Michael Green
45. Claudette September
46. Maano Charles Seala
47. Nokwayiyo Amelia Kopolo
48. Solomon Bereng Thajane
49. Makhasane Dina Maluleke
50. Lazarus Lutchman Charles
51. Katrina De Wee
52. Sello Gideon Mokoele
53. Esther Judith Bloem
54. Frank Pretorius
55. Funeka Ilet Adams
56. Sithembele Lennox Mzongwane
57. Selata Nkwane
58. Ayesha Sumsuddin Sarker
59. Mark Andrew Surgeon
60. Alvina Noch
61. Yogapragasen Rajagopaul Naidoo
62. Nompithizelo Winterose Helebe
63. Kempen Willem Nel
64. Rosina Sebokolodi
65. Bradley Goodson
66. Nongazi Florence Katoo
67. Gavin Eric Hayward
68. Makheleng Mildred Serathi
69. Robin Dale Fisher
70. Constantin Procos
71. Mzwandile Freddie Memani
72. Olga Khumbuzanani Sikukazi
73. Elton Mark Petersen
74. Sylvia Felicity Templeton
75. Jerry Tshilidzi Mulaudzi
76. Geraldine Boitumelo Bokako
77. Johannes Hendrik Gideon Robbertse
78. Rosy Seekoei
79. Jayanthi Lutchman
80. Lebogang Isaac Jan Bokako
81. Evelyn Kukutlwane Mnisi
82. Thembani Makumba
83. Leqwetha Morris Monoana
84. Mookho Elisa Nqeobo
85. Teboho Loate
86. Jesmaine Linda Ganga
87. Dorah Maletsholo Kotsi
88. Sphesihle Cedric Yende
89. Ntombizodidi Kate
90. Johannes Jacob Venter
91. Mlungisi Boysey Bleki
92. Mishack Phillip Mnisi
93. Vuyisile James Pan
94. Anderson Swelindawo
95. Stephen Makhombe
96. Bhekinkosi Andries Ndlovu
97. Tlhankie Jan Maphothoma
98. Bonakele Joseph Makeleng
99. Lizo Carl Kilimani
100. Peter Modikwe
101. Peter Makena
102. Michael Leon Kantey
103. Paulo Santana De Sousa
104. Thavarajan Gopal Pillay
105. Neville Keyster
106. Gavin Bruce Ferrier
107. Jonginkosi Kwetana
108. Gilmor Rudolf Heyns
109. Themba Albert Mthembu
110. Thabiso Edison Jameo Calvert
111. Roelof Johannes Pretorius
112. Marubini Stephen Mugivhi
113. Marubini Maria Mugivhi
114. Xolani Lionel Dlamini
115. Linda Graham
116. Kevin Dani°L Du Plooy
117. Anthony David Hall
118. Elias Lesiba Ledwaba
119. Mohale Joseph Boshego

== Pan Africanist Congress of Azania ==
=== National ===
1. Mzwanele Nyhontso
2. Bennet Joko
3. Luthando Richmond Mbinda
4. Phumzile Selda Phasha
5. Mbuyiselo Daniel Kantso
6. Thandiwe Evelyn Mapalakanye
7. Julia Sophia Wilson
8. Modupi Dicks Maile
9. Jaki Stone Seroke
10. Ernest Botiki Nkopane
11. Charge-In Mabaso
12. Suzan Molete
13. Ntsiri Shadrack Pooe
14. Ramarumo Edward Mfulwane
15. Zamikaya Nicholson Xabe
16. Manelisi Mampana
17. Sbusiso Francisco Xaba
18. Siyabulela Ndamane
19. Richard Nkoto Maoka
20. Mauris Nkosi
21. Henry William Mabaso
22. Phillemon Mafa
23. Walter Xola Lukhuleni
24. Lesiba Johannes Lekgoathi
25. Jabulani Amos Maolele
26. Josias Leoikwe Motlotsi
27. Mashale Lucky Lebyeng
28. Namadzavho Tinny Rambau
29. Matlou Maria Moloto
30. Ngwako Simon Ramalahla
31. Bonyana John Mohlala
32. Rabbi Abram Napo
33. Khutso Moloko Boloka
34. Lobohang Petrus Pila
35. Fhumulani Oriel Luvhimbi
36. Sonti Julia Mgcina
37. Mohlakore Morakane Bernice Mopedi
38. Aggrineth Molope
39. Thamsanqa Enoch Bam
40. Latela Jonas Seota
41. Martinluther Mzukisi Jam
42. Rabuti Gopolang Johannes Kgarimetsa
43. Kelello Segoana
44. Molefi Benjamin Olifant
45. Ditilo Mackinley Maleke
46. Jeffrey Philemon Magano
47. Modise Barnard Mosimanyane
48. Emeldah Khutsafalo Modise
49. Rosinah Ntombi Tshweu
50. Mereki Elias Chowe
51. James Tshelo Setlhafuno
52. Yandiswa Felipe
53. Mmaphuti Stephen Sebetha
54. Malesela Simon Langa
55. Malatji Donacious Ramabu
56. Mantomo Tebogo Mahapa
57. Mokibelo Thulane Ngobeni
58. Mahlatse Sharon Mamabolo
59. Phuti Silas Seema
60. Noah Shakes Sitto
61. Tefu David Machakela
62. Sanelisiwe Dilata
63. Gcobani Katiya
64. Linda Kenneth Ndebele
65. Mmabatho Mosolodi
66. Paseka Ezekiel Makoti
67. Thabiso John Ngumashe
68. Owen Khathazile
69. Sipho Owen Ndhlovu
70. Mlungisi Kenneth Bafo
71. Sindile Sidwell Moya
72. Bathembu Bethwell Lugulwana
73. Narius Kolobe Moloto
74. Edzisani Madzunya

== Al Jama-ah ==
=== National ===
1. Mogamad Ganief Ebrahim Hendricks
2. Nontobeko Mkhwanazi
3. Ebrahim Ismail Tayob
4. Suleiman Kamaar
5. Moeshfiequoh Botha
6. Wilhelmina May Lutuli
7. Moegamat Faried Achmat
8. Thapelo Amad
9. Abdool Kader Dawood
10. Sedick Jacobs
11. Izgak De Jager
12. Galil Brinkhuis
13. Fiona Khan
14. Vusimuzi Michael Ngcobo
15. Nazmie Jamodien

== Green Party of South Africa ==
=== Western Cape ===
1. Jason Douglas Sole
2. Jill Williams
3. Judith Ann Sole
4. Tracy Belinda De Breuyn
5. Justin Saul Friedman
6. Courtney Sasha Cook
7. Bradley Olaf Bergh
8. Elizabeth Martzi Pollard
9. Danielle Jodi Klaff
10. Sivuyile Zingisa Tembani
