= Steven Jafta =

South African politician

Steven Mahlubanzima Jafta is a South African politician from the African Independent Congress. First elected to the National Assembly of South Africa in 2014, he was not initially elected in 2019 after appearing third on the party's list, but later replaced Lulama Ntshayisa after the latter's death due to COVID-19.

Jafta was ranked second on the party's national list for the 2024 general election. The party lost both of its seats at the election.
