= Mzwanele Nyhontso =

South African politician (born 1973)

Mzwanele Nyhontso MP
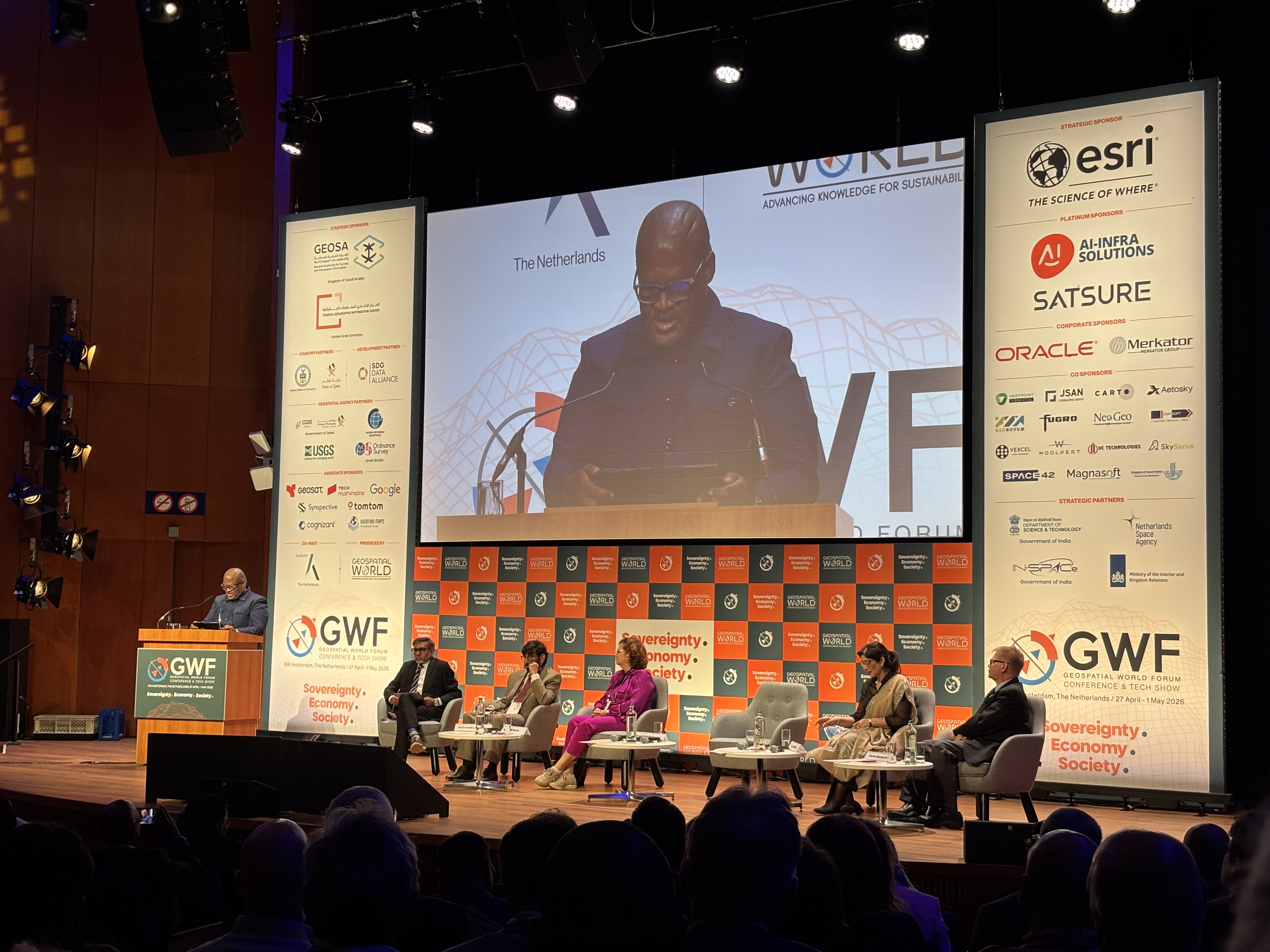

Minister of Land Reform and Rural Development
- Incumbent
- Assumed office 3 July 2024
- President: Cyril Ramaphosa
- Deputy: Chupu Stanley Mathabatha
- Preceded by: Thoko Didiza

Member of the National Assembly of South Africa
- Incumbent
- Assumed office 2 September 2021
- Preceded by: Bennet Joko
- In office 22 May 2019 – 23 June 2021
- Succeeded by: Bennet Joko

Personal details
- Born: 8 September 1973 (age 52)
- Party: Pan Africanist Congress of Azania

Mzwanele Nyhontso (born 8 September 1973) is a South African politician who is the president of the Pan Africanist Congress of Azania, and a member of the National Assembly of South Africa. Since July 2024 he is the Minister of Land Reform and Rural Development in the cabinet of the country's Government of National Unity.

== PAC leadership and parliamentary career ==
In December 2018, Nyhontso was elected leader of the Pan Africanist Congress of Azania. His leadership has been marred by infighting between factions in the party and leadership challenges. His leadership is disputed by Narius Moloto, who was elected PAC leader at a different elective congress earlier in 2018.

In May 2019 Nyhontso was elected to the National Assembly as the PAC's only MP. In June 2019 he became a member of the Joint Standing Committee on Defence, the Portfolio Committee on Higher Education, Science and Technology, the Portfolio Committee on Environment, Forestry and Fisheries, the Portfolio Committee on Mineral Resources and Energy, and the Disciplinary Committee.

Nyhontso was re-elected as PAC leader in September 2019, while another faction re-elected Moloto as leader in August 2019. Nyhontso was officially recognised by the Independent Electoral Commission (IEC) as the legitimate leader of the PAC, but it is still disputed by Moloto and his faction.

In November 2020, Nyhontso's parliamentary membership was suspended by speaker Thandi Modise after the Supreme Court of Appeal ruled that the 2019 decision by the Moloto's faction to expel him could only be set aside by a court of law. Nyhontso then approached the Western Cape High Court and it ordered his reinstatement as a Member of Parliament in the interim on 3 December 2020, pending a decision of the Court regarding the challenge of his recent removal by his party. In February 2021, the High Court dismissed an application by Moloto's faction for leave to appeal an interim ruling that reinstated Nyhontso as the party's single representative in the National Assembly with costs. Nyhontso's application to reinstate him as a Member of Parliament was set aside in May 2021. He then sought to appeal the ruling.

On 23 June 2021, he lost his parliamentary membership again. Bennet Joko was sworn in to replace him. The North Gauteng High Court officially recognised Nyhontso as the legitimate leader of the PAC on 23 August 2021, however, the judgement was based on a technicality due to Moloto's notice of appeal of an earlier ruling not being received by the court's registrar. The court declared Moloto's election in August 2019 invalid. Nyhontso's confirmation as president allowed him to return his seat in the National Assembly and he was sworn in on 2 September 2021, replacing Joko.

In 2024, Nyhontso was again the sole PAC elected MP. He joined the Government of National Unity as Minister of Land Reform and Rural Development after the ANC lost its majority in parliament.

== Minister in GNU ==
On 19 June 2024 the PAC announced that it would join the Government of National Unity (GNU) following the 2024 South African general election, held in on 29 May 2024 to elect a new National Assembly. The election resulted in the ANC party losing its parliamentary majority, followed by the discussions about forming a GNU through a grand coalition. The discussions were initially lead by the ANC and the Democratic Alliance.

On 30 June 2024 ANC president Cyril Ramaphosa confirmed that the PAC signed the GNU Statement of Intent, and announced that Nyhontso will the Minister of Land Reform and Rural Development.

On 3 July 2024, Nyhontso was sworn in as minister as part of President Cyril Ramaphosa's third cabinet.
