= Lulama Ntshayisa =

South African politician (1958–2021)

Member of the National Assembly of South Africa
- In office 21 May 2014 – 23 July 2021
- Succeeded by: Steven Jafta

Personal details
- Born: Lulama Maxwell Ntshayisa; 23 August 1958
- Died: 23 July 2021 (aged 62)
- Cause of death: COVID-19
- Party: African Independent Congress
- Profession: Politician

Lulama Maxwell Ntshayisa (23 August 1958 – 23 July 2021) was a South African politician who was elected to the National Assembly of South Africa at the 2014 general election as a member of the African Independent Congress. He was re-elected in 2019. Ntshayisa died from COVID-19 in 2021.

== Parliamentary career ==
In 2014, Ntshayisa stood for election to the South African National Assembly as second on the national party list of the African Independent Congress. At the May election, he won a seat in the National Assembly. He was sworn in later that month. In June 2014, he was given his committee memberships.

In 2019, he stood for re-election at second on the AIC's national party list again. Ntshayisa was re-elected at the election on May 8, 2019. He was sworn in for a second term as a Member of the National Assembly on May 22. He received his new committee assignments in June 2019.

In April 2021, he became a non-voting member of the Committee for Section 194 Enquiry which will determine Public Protector Busisiwe Mkhwebane's fitness to hold office. He became voting member in June 2021 after the committee's composition was reconstituted to give smaller parties voting rights.

=== Committee assignments ===
- Portfolio Committee on Agriculture, Land Reform and Rural Development
- Portfolio Committee on Basic Education
- Portfolio Committee on Employment and Labour
- Portfolio Committee on Higher Education, Science and Technology
- Portfolio Committee on Sports, Arts and Culture
- Committee for Section 194 Enquiry
- Disciplinary Committee

==== Past committee assignments ====
- Portfolio Committee on Agriculture, Forestry and Fisheries
- Portfolio Committee on Sport and Recreation
- Portfolio Committee on Rural Development and Land Reform
- Ad Hoc Committee on Police Minister's Report on Nkandla

== Death ==
Ntshayisa died from COVID-19 on 23 July 2021.

== See also ==
- List of members of the National Assembly of South Africa who died in office
