= Bennet Joko =

South African politician

Member of the National Assembly
- In office 23 June 2021 – 31 August 2021

Personal details
- Citizenship: South Africa
- Party: Pan Africanist Congress of Azania

Bennet Joko is a South African politician who was briefly a Member of 27th South African Parliament from June to August 2021. He is the Deputy President of the Moloto faction of the Pan Africanist Congress of Azania (PAC). His installation in, and removal from, the PAC's parliamentary seat was part of a factional struggle with Mzwanele Nyhontso's side of the party.

== Political career ==
Joko formerly represented the PAC in the City of Cape Town council and was the PAC's provincial leader in the Western Cape. He was deputy secretary general of the PAC in 2014.

In the 2019 general election, Joko was ranked second on the PAC's national party list, but the party won only one seat in the National Assembly, meaning that Joko narrowly failed to gain election. During subsequent months, Joko was closely involved in factionalism which split the PAC: he was aligned to the faction which claimed Narius Moloto as PAC president, and, in August 2019, he was elected as Moloto's deputy. A rival faction, led by Mzwanele Nyhontso, argued that Moloto and Joko were not the PAC's legitimate leaders. Nyhontso was PAC's sole representative in Parliament, and Moloto announced as early as August 2019 that his faction intended to remove Nyhontso from the PAC's seat and replace him with Joko.

Following a prolonged political and legal battle, Joko was sworn in to Parliament on 23 June 2021: Nyhontso lost his seat after ostensibly being expelled from the PAC. However, in August 2021, the North Gauteng High Court ruled that Nyhontso was the lawful leader of the PAC, entailing that Moloto's faction had not had proper standing to expel him. Nyhontso reclaimed the PAC's parliamentary seat on 31 August.
