= Brenda Mathevula =

South African politician

Brenda Mathevula MP

Permanent delegate to the National Council of Provinces from Limpopo
- In office 1 December 2016 – 24 October 2023

Personal details
- Born: Brenda Tirhani Mathevula Mageva Village,Dzumeri
- Party: Economic Freedom Fighters
- Occupation: Member of Parliament
- Profession: Politician

Brenda Tirhani Mathevula is a South African politician who represented Limpopo in the National Council of Provinces. She is a member of the Economic Freedom Fighters. She became a Member of Parliament in December 2016, following the cessation of Emmanuel Mtileni's party membership.

During her tenure in the NCOP, she opposed the 2018 national minimum wage legislation, citing that it was too little and would not reduce unemployment and poverty.

Mathevula grew up in Mageva, a village in the Dzumeri area; some 34 kilometres from Giyani via the R529 Road. She attended Ukuthula Primary School and matriculated from Nghonyama High School. Her mother is a sangoma of note.

In July 2023, Mathevula was publicly named and shamed and banned from attending the EFF's 10th anniversary celebrations for failing to book buses to transport party supporters in her constituency to the event. She was recalled as an EFF public representative the following month.
