= List of National Assembly members of the 24th Parliament of South Africa =

This is a list of members of the National Assembly in the 24th Parliament of South Africa as elected in the 2004 general election and accounting for changes in membership during the legislative term as of 15 January 2009.

As of January 2009, the Speaker of the National Assembly was Gwen Mahlangu-Nkabinde and Nozizwe Madlala-Routledge was her deputy. Obed Bapela was House Chairperson, with Andries Nel as deputy; and Mnyamezeli Booi was Chief Whip of the Majority Party, with Gratitude Magwanishe as deputy.

== Members ==
Name	Party	List	Term start	Notes
Salam Abram	ANC	Free State	23 April 2004	
Roy Ainslie	ANC	KwaZulu-Natal	23 April 2004	
Tuelo Anthony	ANC	North West	23 April 2004	
Jonathan Arendse	ANC	Western Cape	23 April 2004	
Spetho Asiya	ANC	Northern Cape	23 April 2004	
Ngconde Balfour	ANC	National	23 April 2004	
Richard Baloyi	ANC	Limpopo	23 April 2004	
Obed Bapela	ANC	Gauteng	23 April 2004	
Hennie Bekker	IFP	National	23 April 2004	
Francois Beukman	ANC	Crossed	23 April 2004	On the NNP list for the Western Cape until 1 September 2005.
Fezile Bhengu	ANC	Eastern Cape	23 April 2004	
Mfuniselwa Bhengu	IFP	KwaZulu-Natal	23 April 2004	
Phumzile Bhengu	ANC	KwaZulu-Natal	23 April 2004	
Royith Bhoola	MF	National	23 April 2004	
Jackson Bici	UDM	Eastern Cape	23 April 2004	
Bhekizwe Biyela	IFP	National	23 April 2004	
Sakkie Blanché	DA	Gauteng	23 April 2004	
Dennis Bloem	ANC	National	23 April 2004	
Hendrietta Bogopane-Zulu	ANC	Gauteng	23 April 2004	
George Boinamo	DA	Gauteng	23 April 2004	
Trevor Bonhomme	ANC	National	2 September 2005	
Mnyamezeli Booi	ANC	National	23 April 2004	
Andries Botha	DA	Free State	2 December 2006	
Ntombazana Botha	ANC	Eastern Cape	23 April 2004	
Sandra Botha	DA	Free State	23 April 2004	
Cecil Valentine Burgess	ANC	Crossed	23 April 2004	On the ID list for the Western Cape until 14 September 2005.
Mangosuthu Buthelezi	IFP	National	23 April 2004	
Ismail Cachalia	ANC	Gauteng	23 April 2004	
Sheila Camerer	DA	Gauteng	23 April 2004	
Yunus Carrim	ANC	National	23 April 2004	
Shakes Cele	ANC	KwaZulu-Natal	2 September 2005	
Judy Chalmers	ANC	Eastern Cape	23 April 2004	
Eugenia Chang	IFP	National	23 April 2004	
Hlomane Chauke	ANC	National	23 April 2004	
Sindi Chikunga	ANC	Mpumalanga	23 April 2004	
Fatima Chohan	ANC	National	23 April 2004	
Ryan Coetzee	DA	Gauteng	23 April 2004	
Hannes Combrinck	ANC	Northern Cape	23 April 2004	
Jeremy Cronin	ANC	National	23 April 2004	
Hendry Cupido	ACDP	Western Cape	1 August 2005	
Siyabonga Cwele	ANC	KwaZulu-Natal	23 April 2004	
Beauty Dambuza	ANC	KwaZulu-Natal	23 April 2004	
Pamela Daniels	ANC	Gauteng	24 July 2006	
Ian Davidson	DA	Gauteng	23 April 2004	
Rob Davies	ANC	National	23 April 2004	
Johnny de Lange	ANC	National	23 April 2004	
Patricia de Lille	ID	Gauteng	23 April 2004	
Tertius Delport	DA	Eastern Cape	23 April 2004	
Bonginkosi Dhlamini	IFP	Gauteng	23 April 2004	
Nelson Diale	ANC	Limpopo	23 April 2004	
Mgolodi Dikgacwi	ANC	National	23 April 2004	
Winkie Direko	ANC	National	23 April 2004	
Sello Dithebe	ANC	National	2 September 2005	
Paul Ditshetelo	UCDP	North West	23 April 2004	
David Dlali	ANC	National	23 April 2004	
Nkosazana Dlamini-Zuma	ANC	National	23 April 2004	
Zanele Dlungwana	ANC	Free State	15 May 2008	
Geoff Doidge	ANC	Eastern Cape	23 April 2004	
Willem Doman	DA	Western Cape	23 April 2004	
Anchen Dreyer	DA	Gauteng	1 January 2005	
Cheryllyn Dudley	ACDP	KwaZulu-Natal	23 April 2004	
Dirk du Toit	ANC	National	23 April 2004	
Mike Ellis	DA	KwaZulu-Natal	23 April 2004	
Felix Fankomo	ANC	National	31 October 2008	
Stuart Farrow	DA	Eastern Cape	23 April 2004	
Henry Fazzie	ANC	Eastern Cape	19 September 2007	
Ben Fihla	ANC	Eastern Cape	23 April 2004	
Kegakgametse Forane	ANC	National	19 September 2007	
Cedric Frolick	ANC	Eastern Cape	23 April 2004	
Joan Fubbs	ANC	Gauteng	23 April 2004	
Pico Gabanakgosi	ANC	National	24 July 2006	
Tshoganetso Gasebonwe	ANC	National	31 October 2008	
André Gaum	ANC	Crossed	23 April 2004	On the NNP list for the Western Cape until 13 September 2005.
Ivy Gcina	ANC	Eastern Cape	23 April 2004	
Ndaba Gcwabaza	ANC	KwaZulu-Natal	23 April 2004	
Dion George	DA	Gauteng	15 January 2008	
Pierre-Jeanne Gerber	ANC	National	23 April 2004	
Malusi Gigaba	ANC	KwaZulu-Natal	23 April 2004	
Themba Godi	APC	National	23 April 2004	On the PAC list until 3 September 2007.
Enoch Godongwana	ANC	National	14 November 2008	
John Gogotya	ANC	National	14 May 2004	
Chris Gololo	ANC	Mpumalanga	23 April 2004	
Vincent Gore	ANC	National	23 April 2004	On the ID list until 12 September 2007.
Louis Green	FD	National	23 April 2004	On the ACDP list until 1 September 2005.
Carl Greyling	ANC	Crossed	23 April 2004	On the NNP list for the Western Cape until 1 September 2005.
Lance Greyling	ID	National	23 April 2004	
Pieter Groenewald	FF+	National	23 April 2004	
Donald Gumede	ANC	National	23 April 2004	
Mogomotsi Gumede	ANC	National	23 April 2004	
Bertha Gxowa	ANC	Gauteng	23 April 2004	
Fatima Hajaig	ANC	Gauteng	23 April 2004	
Derek Hanekom	ANC	National	23 April 2004	
Nomatyala Hangana	ANC	National	23 April 2004	
Lindiwe Hendricks	ANC	Eastern Cape	23 April 2004	
Peter Hendrickse	ANC	Eastern Cape	21 July 2004	
Nomvula Hlangwana	ANC	North West	25 June 2007	
Barbara Hogan	ANC	Gauteng	23 April 2004	
Bantu Holomisa	UDM	National	23 April 2004	
Patekile Holomisa	ANC	Eastern Cape	23 April 2004	
Haniff Hoosen	ID	Western Cape	5 September 2007	
Dorothy Hounkpatin	ANC	Gauteng	23 April 2004	
Shiaan-Bin Huang	ANC	KwaZulu-Natal	23 April 2004	
Alex Chekkat Jacob	ANC	National	7 August 2008	
Loretta Jacobus	ANC	Gauteng	23 April 2004	
John Jeffery	ANC	National	23 April 2004	
Sakkie Jenner	ID	National	11 September 2007	
Carol Johnson	ANC	Crossed	23 April 2004	On the NNP list for the Western Cape until 1 September 2005.
Lulu Johnson	ANC	Eastern Cape	23 April 2004	
Pallo Jordan	ANC	National	23 April 2004	
Len Joubert	DA	National	23 April 2004	On the IFP list until 6 September 2005.
Isaac Julies	DA	Western Cape	22 February 2006	
Lerumo Kalako	ANC	National	23 April 2004	
Sandy Kalyan	DA	KwaZulu-Natal	23 April 2004	
Rebecca Kasienyane	ANC	North West	23 April 2004	
Kenneth Khumalo	ANC	National	23 April 2004	
Kgotso Khumalo	ANC	North West	23 April 2004	
Bantutu Kekana	ANC	National	19 September 2007	
Danny Kekana	ANC	Gauteng	23 April 2004	
Lucky Kgabi	ANC	National	14 November 2008	
Ntopile Kganyago	UDM	National	23 April 2004	
Kagiso Khauoe	ANC	National	19 September 2007	
Peter Khoarai	ANC	Free State	18 May 2005	
Eric Kholwane	ANC	Mpumalanga	23 April 2004	
Nthabiseng Khunou	ANC	Free State	23 April 2004	
Ryno King	DA	Western Cape	23 April 2004	
Dianne Kohler-Barnard	DA	KwaZulu-Natal	23 April 2004	
Butana Komphela	ANC	Free State	23 April 2004	
Gerhard Koornhof	ANC	National	23 April 2004	
Zoliswa Kota	ANC	National	23 April 2004	
Zunaid Kotwal	ANC	Mpumalanga	23 April 2004	
Les Labuschagne	DA	Gauteng	23 April 2004	
Luwellyn Landers	ANC	National	23 April 2004	
Pat Lebenya	IFP	KwaZulu-Natal	1 April 2007	
Donald Lee	DA	Eastern Cape	23 April 2004	
George Lekgetho	ANC	National	2 September 2005	
Tony Leon	DA	Gauteng	23 April 2004	
Thomas Likotsi	APC	National	23 April 2004	On the PAC list until 6 September 2007.
Tshiwela Lishivha	ANC	Limpopo	23 April 2004	
Shelley Loe	DA	Northern Cape	17 August 2005	
Sam Louw	ANC	North West	23 April 2004	
Tsietsi Louw	ANC	National	23 April 2004	
Mark Lowe	DA	KwaZulu-Natal	23 April 2004	
Eric Lucas	IFP	KwaZulu-Natal	23 April 2004	
Albertina Luthuli	ANC	KwaZulu-Natal	23 April 2004	
Jerome Maake	ANC	Limpopo	14 May 2004	
Brigitte Mabandla	ANC	National	23 April 2004	
Bob Mabaso	ANC	National	14 November 2008	
Louisa Mabe	ANC	National	23 April 2004	
Curtis Mabena	ANC	National	23 April 2004	
Rejoice Mabudafhasi	ANC	Limpopo	23 April 2004	
Mighty Madasa	ANC	Crossed	23 April 2004	On the ACDP list for Gauteng until 8 September 2005.
Andrew Madella	ANC	Western Cape	2 September 2005	
George Madikiza	UDM	National	23 April 2004	
Nozizwe Madlala-Routledge	ANC	KwaZulu-Natal	23 April 2004	
Lawrence Maduma	ANC	Western Cape	23 April 2004	
Maureen Madumise	ANC	Free State	23 April 2004	
Ruth Magau	ANC	Free State	23 April 2004	
Emmanuel Magubane	ANC	National	23 April 2004	
Gratitude Magwanishe	ANC	National	23 April 2004	
Themba Mahlaba	ANC	National	24 July 2006	
Gwen Mahlangu-Nkabinde	ANC	National	23 April 2004	
Nomhle Mahlawe	ANC	Eastern Cape	23 April 2004	
Farida Mahomed	ANC	National	23 April 2004	
Samson Mahote	ANC	National	23 April 2004	
Sophie Maine	ANC	North West	23 April 2004	
Shoahlane John Maja	ANC	Limpopo	23 April 2004	
Caroline Makasi	ANC	Western Cape	23 April 2004	
Wendy Makgate	ANC	North West	23 April 2004	
Joe Malahlela	ANC	National	23 April 2004	
Lorna Maloney	ANC	North West	23 April 2004	
Peter Maluleka	ANC	Gauteng	23 April 2004	
Dan Maluleke	ANC	Crossed	23 April 2004	On the DA list for Gauteng until 15 September 2005.
Sibongile Manana	ANC	Mpumalanga	23 April 2004	
Trevor Manuel	ANC	National	23 April 2004	
Kobus Marais	DA	Western Cape	4 December 2006	
Inka Mars	IFP	National	23 April 2004	
Ben Martins	ANC	National	23 April 2004	
James Masango	DA	Mpumalanga	23 April 2004	
Tlokwe Maserumule	ANC	Limpopo	23 April 2004	
Puleng Mashangoane	ANC	Limpopo	23 April 2004	
Refilwe Mashigo	ANC	Limpopo	23 April 2004	
Buoang Mashile	ANC	Limpopo	14 May 2004	
Agnes Mashishi	ANC	National	31 October 2008	
Michael Masutha	ANC	National	23 April 2004	
Piet Mathebe	ANC	Mpumalanga	23 April 2004	
Nomvula Mathibela	ANC	Limpopo	23 April 2004	
Motswaledi Matlala	ANC	Limpopo	23 April 2004	
Wendy Matsemela	ANC	National	2 September 2005	
Ivy Matsepe-Casaburri	ANC	National	23 April 2004	
Jane Matsomela	ANC	National	2 September 2005	
Maggie Maunye	ANC	Gauteng	23 April 2004	
Shepherd Mayatula	ANC	Eastern Cape	23 April 2004	
Baleka Mbete	ANC	National	23 April 2004	
Mandla Mbili	ANC	KwaZulu-Natal	7 August 2006	
Nozizwe Mbombo	ANC	National	23 April 2004	
Nomakhaya Mdaka	ANC	Crossed	23 April 2004	On the UDM list until 15 September 2005 and then on the UIF list until 12 September 2007.
Shepherd Mdladlana	ANC	National	23 April 2004	
Makhosazana Mdlalose	NADECO	Crossed	23 April 2004	On the IFP list for KwaZulu-Natal until 6 September 2005.
Vytjie Mentor	ANC	Northern Cape	23 April 2004	
Violet Meruti	ANC	National	23 April 2004	
Kenneth Meshoe	ACDP	National	23 April 2004	
Nomaindiya Mfeketo	ANC	National	6 May 2008	
Sipho Mfundisi	UCDP	National	23 April 2004	
Hlengiwe Mgabadeli	ANC	National	23 April 2004	
Karel Minnie	DA	Gauteng	23 April 2004	
Zakhele Mkhize	ANC	KwaZulu-Natal	23 April 2004	
Bongani Mkongi	ANC	Western Cape	11 November 2004	
Andrew Mlangeni	ANC	Gauteng	23 April 2004	
Albert Mncwango	IFP	National	23 April 2004	
Bafunani Mnguni	ANC	Free State	23 April 2004	
Bheki Mnyandu	ANC	Crossed	23 April 2004	On the DA list for KwaZulu-Natal until 15 September 2005.
Monako Moatshe	ANC	North West	23 April 2004	
Lewele Modisenyane	ANC	Free State	23 April 2004	
Ron Mofokeng	ANC	National	23 April 2004	
Ofentse Mogale	ANC	National	14 May 2004	
Isaac Mogase	ANC	National	23 April 2004	
Ismail Mohamed	ANC	National	23 April 2004	
Rubben Mohlaloga	ANC	National	23 April 2004	
Sally Moiloa-Nqodi	ANC	National	31 October 2008	
Aubrey Mokoena	ANC	Gauteng	23 April 2004	
Nthibane Mokoto	ANC	North West	23 April 2004	
Christopher Molefe	ANC	North West	23 April 2004	
Arthur Moloto	ANC	Limpopo	23 April 2004	
Papi Moloto	ANC	National	14 November 2008	
Oupa Monareng	ANC	Gauteng	23 April 2004	
Dan Montsitsi	ANC	National	23 April 2004	
Kay Moonsamy	ANC	National	23 April 2004	
Gareth Morgan	DA	KwaZulu-Natal	23 April 2004	
Craig Morkel	ANC	Crossed	23 April 2004	On the DA list for the Western Cape until 15 September 2005, then on the PIM list until 12 September 2007.
Walter Morwamoche	ANC	Limpopo	23 April 2004	
Dimakatso Morobi	ANC	National	23 April 2004	
Joyce Moloi-Moropa	ANC	National	14 November 2008	
Storey Morutoa	ANC	Gauteng	23 April 2004	
Bahlakoana Mosala	ANC	Free State	23 April 2004	
Linda Moss	ANC	Western Cape	23 April 2004	
Maxwell Moss	ANC	Western Cape	23 April 2004	
Mandisi Mpahlwa	ANC	National	23 April 2004	
Alfred Mpontshane	IFP	KwaZulu-Natal	23 April 2004	
Ben Mthembu	ANC	National	23 April 2004	
Nathi Mthethwa	ANC	National	23 April 2004	
Eric Mtshali	ANC	National	23 April 2004	
Corné Mulder	FF+	National	23 April 2004	
Pieter Mulder	FF+	National	23 April 2004	
Monontsi Mzondeki	ANC	National	23 April 2004	
John Henry Nash	ANC	Eastern Cape	7 August 2008	
Zintle Ndlazi	ANC	National	15 August 2007	On the UIF list until 12 September 2007.
Velaphi Ndlovu	IFP	KwaZulu-Natal	23 April 2004	
Rita Ndzanga	ANC	National	23 April 2004	
Pandelani Nefolovhodwe	AZAPO	National	23 April 2004	
Andries Nel	ANC	Gauteng	23 April 2004	
Maans Nel	DA	Northern Cape	23 April 2004	
Mdudu Nene	ANC	KwaZulu-Natal	7 August 2006	
Nhlanhla Nene	ANC	National	23 April 2004	
Wilma Newhoudt-Druchen	ANC	National	23 April 2004	
Elizabeth Ngaleka	ANC	National	23 April 2004	
Doris Ngcengwane	ANC	Gauteng	23 April 2004	
Beatrice Ngcobo	ANC	National	15 September 2005	
Eugene Ngcobo	ANC	National	23 April 2004	
Wilson Ngcobo	ANC	KwaZulu-Natal	7 August 2006	
James Ngculu	ANC	National	23 April 2004	
Joyce Ngele	ANC	Gauteng	14 May 2004	
Vincent Ngema	NADECO	Crossed	23 April 2004	On the IFP list for KwaZulu-Natal until 6 September 2005.
Chris Ngiba	NADECO	Crossed	23 April 2004	On the IFP list for KwaZulu-Natal until 6 September 2005.
Lydia Ngwenya	ANC	Limpopo	23 April 2004	
Winnie Ngwenya	ANC	Gauteng	2 September 2005	
Vusi Nhlapo	ANC	National	24 July 2006	
Dumisile Nhlengethwa	ANC	Mpumalanga	23 April 2004	
Sisa Njikelana	ANC	Gauteng	23 April 2004	
Makho Njobe	ANC	Eastern Cape	23 April 2004	
Nonhlanhla Nkabinde	UDM	National	23 April 2004	
Constance Nkuna	ANC	Limpopo	23 April 2004	
Robert Nogumla	ANC	Eastern Cape	23 April 2004	
Mwelo Nonkonyana	ANC	National	23 April 2004	
Charles Nqakula	ANC	National	23 April 2004	
Nosiviwe Nqakula	ANC	National	23 April 2004	
Benjamin Ntuli	ANC	National	23 April 2004	
Bongi Ntuli	ANC	Mpumalanga	23 April 2004	
Makhoni Ntuli	ANC	KwaZulu-Natal	23 April 2004	
Richard Ntuli	ANC	Crossed	23 April 2004	On the DA list for Gauteng until 15 September 2005.
Phillia Nwamitwa	ANC	Limpopo	23 April 2004	
Doreen Nxumalo	ANC	Gauteng	23 April 2004	
Samuel Nxumalo	ANC	KwaZulu-Natal	23 April 2004	
Jomo Nyambi	ANC	Mpumalanga	24 July 2006	
Kanon Nyembe	ANC	National	7 August 2008	
Lewis Nzimande	ANC	National	23 April 2004	
Dan Olifant	ANC	Western Cape	23 April 2004	
Godfrey Oliphant	ANC	National	23 April 2004	
Gert Oosthuizen	ANC	National	23 April 2004	
Sydney Opperman	DA	Western Cape	23 April 2004	
Roy Padayachie	ANC	National	23 April 2004	
Naledi Pandor	ANC	National	23 April 2004	
George Phadagi	ANC	Limpopo	23 April 2004	
John Phala	ANC	Limpopo	23 April 2004	
Motsoko Pheko	PAC	National	23 April 2004	
Johannes Phungula	ANC	National	23 April 2004	
Randy Pieterse	ANC	Western Cape	23 April 2004	
Bafitlhile Pule	UCDP	National	23 April 2004	
Pierre Rabie	DA	Western Cape	23 April 2004	
Ruth Rabinowitz	IFP	National	23 April 2004	
Bheki Radebe	ANC	Free State	23 April 2004	
Jeff Radebe	ANC	National	23 April 2004	
Margaret Rajbally	MF	KwaZulu-Natal	23 April 2004	
Dorothy Ramodibe	ANC	Gauteng	23 April 2004	
Mildred Ramakaba-Lesiea	ANC	National	23 April 2004	
Mewa Ramgobin	ANC	National	23 April 2004	
Solly Rasmeni	ANC	North West	23 April 2004	
Lanval Reid	ANC	National	23 April 2004	
Usha Roopnarain	IFP	KwaZulu-Natal	23 April 2004	
Cas Saloojee	ANC	National	23 April 2004	
Johnny Schippers	ANC	Crossed	26 August 2005	On the NNP list for the Western Cape until 1 September 2005.
Hendrik Schmidt	DA	Gauteng	23 April 2004	
Greg Schneemann	ANC	Gauteng	23 April 2004	
Manie Schoeman	ANC	Eastern Cape	23 April 2004	
Mokgothu Seadimo	ANC	National	24 July 2006	
Sybil Seaton	IFP	KwaZulu-Natal	23 April 2004	
Molefi Sefularo	ANC	National	23 April 2004	
Lepota Sehlare	ANC	National	19 September 2007	
Priscilla Sekgobela	ANC	Mpumalanga	23 April 2004	
Joseph Selau	ANC	North West	1 June 2007	
James Selfe	DA	Western Cape	23 April 2004	
Janet Semple	DA	Gauteng	23 April 2004	
Connie September	ANC	National	23 April 2004	
Joe Seremane	DA	North West	23 April 2004	
Susan Shabangu	ANC	National	23 April 2004	
Rafeek Shah	DA	KwaZulu-Natal	23 April 2004	
Sicelo Shiceka	ANC	Gauteng	25 September 2008	
Thandi Shongwe	ANC	National	9 December 2008	
Pat Sibande	ANC	Mpumalanga	23 April 2004	
Jonas Sibanyoni	ANC	Mpumalanga	23 April 2004	
Ntombikayise Sibhidla	ANC	KwaZulu-Natal	12 September 2007	
Sipho Siboza	ANC	Mpumalanga	23 April 2004	
Mabalana Sibuyana	IFP	National	23 April 2004	
Sylvia Sigcau	UDM	Eastern Cape	23 April 2004	
Richard Sikakane	ANC	National	23 April 2004	
Doris Sikosana	ANC	National	14 November 2008	
Stan Simmons	NA	Crossed	23 April 2004	On the NNP list for the Western Cape until 1 September 2005, then on the UPSA list until 14 September 2007.
Narend Singh	IFP	KwaZulu-Natal	23 August 2007	
Lindiwe Sisulu	ANC	National	23 April 2004	
Dumisani Sithole	ANC	Gauteng	23 April 2004	
Stone Sizani	ANC	Eastern Cape	23 September 2008	
Windvoël Skhosana	ANC	North West	23 April 2004	
Ben Skosana	IFP	National	23 April 2004	
Zola Skweyiya	ANC	National	23 April 2004	
Peter Smith	IFP	KwaZulu-Natal	23 April 2004	
Vincent Smith	ANC	Gauteng	23 April 2004	
Dene Smuts	DA	Western Cape	23 April 2004	
Bangilizwe Solo	ANC	National	23 April 2004	
Gassan Solomon	ANC	National	23 April 2004	
Buyelwa Sonjica	ANC	Eastern Cape	23 April 2004	
Rose Sonto	ANC	National	23 April 2004	
Jabu Sosibo	ANC	National	23 April 2004	
Maggie Sotyu	ANC	Free State	23 April 2004	
Willie Spies	FF+	Gauteng	23 April 2004	
Martin Stephens	DA	National	23 April 2004	On the UDM list until 6 September 2005.
Butch Steyn	DA	Gauteng	23 April 2004	
Thandile Sunduza	ANC	National	14 November 2008	
Enver Surty	ANC	North West	23 April 2004	
Jean Swanson-Jacobs	ANC	National	23 April 2004	
Paul Swart	DA	North West	23 April 2004	
Marius Swart	DA	Western Cape	23 April 2004	
Steven Swart	ACDP	National	23 April 2004	
Mpowele Swathe	DA	Limpopo	23 April 2004	
Elizabeth Thabethe	ANC	Gauteng	23 April 2004	
Barbara Thomson	ANC	National	23 April 2004	
Bulelwa Tinto	ANC	Western Cape	23 April 2004	
Manana Tlake	ANC	National	24 July 2006	
Thandi Tobias	ANC	National	23 April 2004	
Jack Tolo	ANC	Limpopo	23 April 2004	
Eddie Trent	DA	Eastern Cape	23 April 2004	
Lech Tsenoli	ANC	National	23 April 2004	
Manto Tshabalala-Msimang	ANC	National	23 April 2004	
Tovhowani Tshivhase	ANC	National	23 April 2004	
Pam Tshwete	ANC	Eastern Cape	23 April 2004	
Ben Turok	ANC	National	23 April 2004	
Ntombikayise Twala	ANC	Eastern Cape	28 February 2007	
Ismail Vadi	ANC	Gauteng	23 April 2004	
Randall van den Heever	ANC	National	23 April 2004	
Koos van der Merwe	IFP	National	23 April 2004	
Susan van der Merwe	ANC	National	23 April 2004	
Désirée van der Walt	DA	Limpopo	23 April 2004	
Manie van Dyk	DA	Gauteng	23 April 2004	
Kraai van Niekerk	DA	Western Cape	23 April 2004	
Marthinus van Schalkwyk	ANC	Crossed	23 April 2004	On the NNP list for the Western Cape until 1 September 2005.
Annelizé van Wyk	ANC	National	23 April 2004	
Suzanne Vos	IFP	National	23 April 2004	
Sifanelo Vundisa	ANC	National	23 April 2004	
Yi-Ju Wang	ANC	National	23 April 2004	On the ID list until 12 September 2007.
Mike Waters	DA	Gauteng	23 April 2004	
Hilda Weber	DA	Mpumalanga	23 April 2004	
Gavin Woods	NADECO	National	23 April 2004	On the IFP list until 6 September 2005.
Freda Wright	ANC	National	31 October 2008	
Lulu Xingwana	ANC	Gauteng	23 April 2004	
Everson Xolo	ANC	KwaZulu-Natal	23 April 2004	
Lumka Yengeni	ANC	National	23 April 2004	
Connie Zikalala	IFP	National	23 April 2004	
Langa Zita	ANC	Gauteng	23 April 2004	
Musa Zondi	IFP	KwaZulu-Natal	23 April 2004	
Paul Zondo	ANC	National	9 December 2008	
Zeblon Zulu	ANC	National	23 April 2004	

== Former Members ==
Member	Party	List	Term start	Term end	Replacement	Notes
Nokuthenjwa Eustacia Bulana	ID	National	Elected but not sworn in		Vincent Gore	
Joyce Kgoali	ANC	Gauteng	Elected but not sworn in		Joyce Ngele	
Mninwa Mahlangu	ANC	Limpopo	Elected but not sworn in		Buoang Mashile	
Lillian Matlhoahela	ID	National	Elected but not sworn in		Florence Batyi	
Lameck Mokoena	ANC	Limpopo	Elected but not sworn in		Jerome Maake	
Billy Nair	ANC	National	Elected but not sworn in		Ofentse Mogale	
Visvin Reddy	DA	KwaZulu-Natal	Elected but not sworn in		Bheki Mnyandu	
Thabo Mbeki	ANC	National	23 April 2004	23 April 2004	John Gogotya	Elected President of South Africa
Mosibudi Mangena	AZAPO	National	23 April 2004	26 April 2004	Dan Habedi	
Ebrahim Ebrahim	ANC	KwaZulu-Natal	23 April 2004	1 May 2004	Vincent Mabuyakhulu	
Dan Habedi	AZAPO	National	26 April 2004	7 June 2004	Selby Khumalo (ACDP)	Seat relinquished to the ACDP by court order
Mzwandile Masala	ANC	Eastern Cape	23 April 2004	29 June 2004	Peter Hendrickse	
Bruce Kannemeyer	ANC	Western Cape	23 April 2004	1 November 2004	Bongani Mkongi	
Raenette Taljaard	DA	Gauteng	23 April 2004	1 January 2005	Anchen Dreyer	
Popo Molefe	ANC	National	23 April 2004	8 March 2005	Wendy Matsemela	
Neo Masithela	ANC	Free State	23 April 2004	18 May 2005	Peter Khoarai	
Jacob Zuma	ANC	National	23 April 2004	15 June 2005	George Lekgetho	
Kent Durr	ACDP	Western Cape	23 April 2004	31 July 2005	Hendry Cupido	
Ruth Bhengu	ANC	KwaZulu-Natal	23 April 2004	1 August 2005	Shakes Cele	
Manne Dipico	ANC	National	23 April 2004	1 August 2005	Trevor Bonhomme	
Cecil Herandien	NNP	Western Cape	23 April 2004	1 August 2005	Johnny Schippers	
Rhoda Joemat	ANC	Western Cape	23 April 2004	1 August 2005	Andrew Madella	
Mavis Magazi	ANC	Gauteng	23 April 2004	1 August 2005	Winnie Ngwenya	
Nana Mnandi	ANC	National	23 April 2004	1 August 2005	Sello Dithebe	
Mildred Mpaka	ANC	National	23 April 2004	1 August 2005	Jane Matsomela	
Ross Henderson	DA	Northern Cape	23 April 2004	16 August 2005	Shelley Loe	
Nathi Nhleko	ANC	National	23 April 2004	1 September 2005	Vusi Nhlapo	
Ngoako Ramatlhodi	ANC	National	23 April 2004	22 September 2005	Mokgothu Seadimo	
Sarel Haasbroek	DA	Western Cape	23 April 2004	16 October 2005	Isaac Julies	
Cheryl Gillwald	ANC	National	23 April 2004	31 January 2006	Themba Mahlaba	
Helen Zille	DA	Western Cape	23 April 2004	8 March 2006	Kobus Marais	
China Dodovu	ANC	North West	23 April 2004	16 March 2006	Gaolaolwe Selau	
Kgaogelo Lekgoro	ANC	Gauteng	23 April 2004	23 March 2006	Pamela Daniels	
Stella Sigcau	ANC	National	23 April 2004	7 May 2006	Zipporah Nawa	
Lucky Gabela	ANC	KwaZulu-Natal	23 April 2004	15 May 2006	Wilson Ngcobo	
Selby Khumalo	ANC	National	11 June 2004	16 May 2006	Manana Tlake	On the ACDP list until 8 September 2005
Garth Mngomezulu	ANC	Mpumalanga	23 April 2004	1 June 2006	Jomo Nyambi	
Samson Ndou	ANC	National	23 April 2004	9 June 2006	Pico Gabanakgosi	
Vincent Mabuyakhulu	ANC	KwaZulu-Natal	14 May 2004	12 July 2006	Mdudu Nene	
Malizole Diko	UIF	National	23 April 2004	28 July 2006	Zintle Ndlazi	On the UDM list until 15 September 2005
Happy Blose	ANC	KwaZulu-Natal	23 April 2004	7 August 2006	Mandla Mbili	
James Kati	ANC	Eastern Cape	23 April 2004	29 September 2006	Ntombikayise Twala	
Tshepiso Ramphele	ANC	National	23 April 2004	1 October 2006	Tshoganetso Gasebonwe	
Roy Jankielsohn	DA	Free State	23 April 2004	1 December 2006	Andries Botha	
Mbulelo Goniwe	ANC	Eastern Cape	23 April 2004	14 December 2006	Henry Fazzie	
Enyinna Nkem-Abonta	ANC	KwaZulu-Natal	23 April 2004	1 February 2007	Kagiso Khauoe	On the DA list until 15 September 2005
Salie Manie	ANC	National	23 April 2004	1 March 2007	Kegakgametse Forane	
Ellis Vezi	IFP	KwaZulu-Natal	23 April 2004	31 March 2007	Pat Lebenya	
Nhlanhla Zulu	IFP	KwaZulu-Natal	23 April 2004	15 June 2007	Narend Singh	
Nono Maloyi	ANC	North West	23 April 2004	25 June 2007	Nomvula Hlangwana	
Mpho Lekgoro	ANC	National	23 April 2004	1 August 2007	Bantutu Kekana	
Yusuf Bhamjee	ANC	KwaZulu-Natal	23 April 2004	10 August 2007	Ntombikayise Sibhidla	
Frene Ginwala	ANC	National	23 April 2004	17 August 2007	Lepota Sehlare	
Avril Harding	ID	Western Cape	23 April 2004	22 August 2007	Haniff Hoosen	
Florence Batyi	ID	National	23 April 2004	28 August 2007	Sakkie Jenner	
Zipporah Nawa	ANC	National	24 July 2006	5 November 2007	Kgalema Motlanthe	
Ali Maziya	ANC	National	23 April 2004	1 December 2007	Alex Chekkat Jacob	
Douglas Gibson	DA	Gauteng	23 April 2004	15 January 2008	Dion George	
John Gomomo	ANC	Eastern Cape	23 April 2004	22 January 2008	Stone Sizani	
Kader Asmal	ANC	National	23 April 2004	1 March 2008	Nomaindiya Mfeketo	
Ncumisa Kondlo	ANC	Eastern Cape	23 April 2004	23 March 2008	John Henry Nash	
Sisi Ntombela	ANC	Free State	23 April 2004	14 May 2008	Zanele Dlungwana	
Sithole Mshudulu	ANC	National	23 April 2004	25 July 2008	Kanon Nyembe	
Mluleki George	ANC	Eastern Cape	23 April 2004	23 September 2008	Vacant as of January 2009	
Geraldine Fraser-Moleketi	ANC	National	23 April 2004	25 September 2008	Enoch Godongwana	
Kgalema Motlanthe	ANC	National	6 May 2008	25 September 2008	Lucky Kgabi	Elected President of South Africa
Ronnie Kasrils	ANC	National	23 April 2004	25 September 2008	Felix Fankomo	
Mosiuoa Lekota	ANC	National	23 April 2004	25 September 2008	Thandile Sunduza	
Phumzile Mlambo-Ngcuka	ANC	National	23 April 2004	25 September 2008	Agnes Mashishi	
Jabu Moleketi	ANC	Gauteng	23 April 2004	25 September 2008	Sicelo Shiceka	
Sydney Mufamadi	ANC	National	23 April 2004	25 September 2008	Freda Wright	
Aziz Pahad	ANC	National	23 April 2004	25 September 2008	Doris Sikosana	
Essop Pahad	ANC	National	23 April 2004	25 September 2008	Sally Moiloa-Nqodi	
Thoko Didiza	ANC	National	23 April 2004	26 September 2008	Papi Moloto	
Alec Erwin	ANC	National	23 April 2004	26 September 2008	Joyce Moloi-Moropa	
Kiki Rwexana	ANC	National	23 April 2004	28 October 2008	Bob Mabaso	
Lolo Mashiane	ANC	National	23 April 2004	25 November 2008	Thandi Shongwe	
Mampe Ramotsamai	ANC	National	23 April 2004	2 December 2008	Paul Zondo	

== See also ==
- Travelgate
- 2005 South African floor-crossing window
- 2007 South African floor-crossing window
- Second Cabinet of Thabo Mbeki
- Cabinet of Kgalema Motlanthe
