= Dan Maluleke =

South African politician

Member of the National Assembly
- In office June 1999 – May 2009
- Constituency: Gauteng

Personal details
- Born: Daniel Kapeni Maluleke; 21 April 1943 (age 83)
- Citizenship: South Africa
- Party: African National Congress (since 2005)
- Other political affiliations: Democratic Alliance; Democratic Party; African Christian Democratic Party

Daniel Kapeni Maluleke (born 21 April 1943) is a retired South African politician who served in the National Assembly from 1999 to 2009, representing the Gauteng constituency. He was a member of the Democratic Party (DP), later the Democratic Alliance (DA), until September 2005, when he crossed the floor to the African National Congress (ANC). He is a former deputy chairperson of the DA.

== Early life ==
Maluleke was born on 21 April 1943. He entered politics in 1994 as a founding member of the African Christian Democratic Party (ACDP). After he left the ACDP, he was recruited to the DP, which he represented as a local councillor in Orlando East, Soweto.

== Legislative career: 1999–2009 ==
In the 1999 general election, he was elected to a DP seat in the Gauteng caucus of the National Assembly. He was re-elected to a second term in the seat in 2004, as the highest-ranked black candidate, and eighth-highest overall, on the DA's Gauteng party list.

Maluleke's race was of political import in the DA of the period, which was seeking to diversify its membership and constituency. In November 2001, Maluleke led a party press conference on race relations inside the DA. He denied that the DA served only white interests but admitted that there were "cultural" difference between the party's black and white members; he said that he was planning a workshop to provide a "chance for [DA leader] Tony Leon and others to acclimatise" themselves to the culture of black members.

The following month, Maluleke and three other black DA members – Donald Lee, Richard Ntuli, and Wilson Ngcobo – were co-opted onto the DA's national management committee in a move explicitly presented as designed "to promote representivity". At the next DA elective conference in April 2002, Maluleke was elected to deputise Leon as one of the party's three deputy chairpersons; the other deputies were Gerald Morkel and Helen Zille.

=== Defection to the ANC: 2005 ===
Hours before the end of the floor-crossing window of September 2005, Maluleke announced that he had resigned from the DA in order to join the governing ANC. He was accompanied by three other black DA MPs: Richard Ntuli, Enyinna Nkem-Abonta, and Bheki Mnyandu. The quartet accused the DA of racism. In a speech to the house, Maluleke claimed that the DA's governance structures and staff were "overwhelmingly white" and that "no black person has any meaningful degree of authority" within the party. He said, "Our leaving that God-forsaken outfit, the DA, had nothing to do with chequebook politics but a lot with the visionary leadership of President Thabo Mbeki that arises from the progressive policies of the ANC."

The DA, which reacted to the defections with surprise, attempted to challenge the defections in court on technical grounds. Among other things, the DA objected to the fact that Maluleke had voted with the DA in Parliament even after signing his floor-crossing forms, thereby pretending that he was still a DA member. The DA lost the court challenge, and Maluleke served the rest of the parliamentary term under the ANC banner. He left Parliament after the 2009 general election.
