= Bheki Mnyandu =

South African politician

Member of the National Assembly
- In office 23 April 2004 – May 2009
- Constituency: KwaZulu-Natal

Personal details
- Born: Bhekinhlahla Jeremia Mnyandu; 19 November 1955 (age 70)
- Citizenship: South Africa
- Party: African National Congress (since September 2005)
- Other political affiliations: Democratic Alliance (until September 2005)

Bhekinhlahla Jeremia Mnyandu (born 19 September 1970) is a South African academic and politician who represented KwaZulu-Natal in the National Assembly from 2004 to 2009. He was a member of the Democratic Alliance (DA) until September 2005, when he crossed the floor to the African National Congress (ANC).

== Political career ==
Mnyandu was formerly an academic in KwaZulu-Natal. He joined the National Assembly as a DA representative after the 2004 general election; he was sworn in to the seat, one of the DA's eight in the KwaZulu-Natal caucus, after it was declined by member-elect Visvin Reddy.

Hours before the end of the floor-crossing window of September 2005, Mnyandu announced that he had resigned from the DA in order to join the governing ANC. He was accompanied by three other black DA MPs – Richard Ntuli, Enyinna Nkem-Abonta, and Dan Maluleke – and DA leader Tony Leon later complaint that they had all been "direct beneficiaries of the DA's attempts to increase the diversity of the party's leadership".

In the 2009 general election, Mnyandu stood for re-election under the ANC's banner, but he was ranked too low on the party list to win a seat.
