= Stan Simmons =

South African politician (born 1945)

Member of the National Assembly
- In office until May 2009
- Constituency: Western Cape

Personal details
- Born: Stanley Simmons; 26 October 1945 (age 80)
- Citizenship: South Africa
- Party: National Alliance (since 2007)
- Other political affiliations: United Party of South Africa (2005–2007); New National Party (1997–2005); National Party (until 1997)

Stanley Simmons (born 26 October 1945) is a South African politician who served in the National Assembly until 2009. He joined during the first democratic Parliament as a member of the National Party (NP) and then the New National Party (NNP). However, when the NNP disbanded in April 2005, he crossed the floor to his own one-man party, the United Party of South Africa (UPSA). In September 2007, he crossed the floor again to the National Alliance.

== Legislative career ==
Simmons was not initially elected to the National Assembly in the 1994 general election, but he joined during the legislative term, filling a casual vacancy in the NP's caucus. He was elected to full terms in the assembly in 1999 and 2004, and he represented the Western Cape constituency.

However, following the NNP's poor performance in the 2004 general election, the party began preparations to disband, and its members were encouraged to prepare to join the governing African National Congress (ANC). Simmons announced in August 2005 that he would not join the ANC but would instead launch a new party, which became UPSA. When the 2005 floor-crossing window closed in September 2005, Simmons was the only one of the NNP's seven former representatives who did not join the ANC; he instead crossed the floor to UPSA, becoming its sole representative in Parliament.

During the next floor-crossing window in September 2007, Simmons again crossed the floor, this time to the National Alliance. The party did not win any seats in the 2009 general election.
