= Florence Batyi =

South African politician (born 1952)

Member of the National Assembly
- In office 23 April 2004 – 28 August 2007

Personal details
- Born: 3 November 1952 (age 73)
- Citizenship: South Africa
- Party: Independent Democrats (until August 2007)

Florence Batyi (born 3 November 1952) is a South African politician who represented the Independent Democrats (ID) in the National Assembly from 2004 to 2007. She was expelled from the party in August 2007 on suspicion of planning to cross the floor to another party.

== Legislative career ==
In the 2004 general election, Batyi was elected to an ID seat in the Western Cape Provincial Parliament. However, she was sworn in to the National Assembly instead, taking up a seat that had been declined by Lillian Matlhoahela. She served as the ID's spokesperson on housing.

On 28 August 2007, Batyi was expelled from the ID and therefore lost her seat in Parliament. Her expulsion was part of the ID's strategy to disable members who were suspected of planning to defect to other parties during the upcoming floor-crossing window. Batyi continued to deny any intention to cross the floor, and she lodged an unsuccessful application to reverse her expulsion in the Cape High Court. The following week, the ID also expelled Aaron Kallie, a City of Cape Town councillor with whom Batyi reportedly had a romantic relationship; ID leader Patricia de Lille told the press that Batyi had "tipped off" the party that Kallie intended to cross the floor. Batyi's attempts to challenge her expulsion failed and her parliamentary seat was filled by the ID's Sakkie Jenner.
