= Ofentse =

Ofentse is a Sotho-Tswana name meaning "God has conquered/God has saved." Notable people with the name include:

- Ofentse Bakwadi, Motswana karateka
- Ofentse Mogale (1963-2022), South African politician
- Ofentse Mogawane (born 1982), South African sprinter
- Ofentse Mokae, South African politician
- Ofentse Mwase (born 1987), South African filmmaker
- Ofentse Nato (born 1989), Motswana footballer
- Ofentse Pitse (born 1992), South African conductor and architect.
- Ofentse Mafalo (born 2006), South African Fundza Poetry and short story Award winner.
