= John Henry Nash =

John Henry Nash may refer to:

- John Nash (footballer) (1867–1939), English footballer
- John Henry Nash (printer) (1871–1947), Canadian-American printer
- John Henry Nash (politician) (born 1933), South African politician
