= Ross Henderson =

South African politician (born 1951)

Member of the Northern Cape Provincial Legislature
- In office 2005–2007

Member of the National Assembly
- In office 23 April 2004 – 16 August 2005
- Constituency: Northern Cape

Personal details
- Born: 28 October 1951 (age 74)
- Citizenship: South Africa
- Party: Democratic Alliance (until 2007)

Ross Kirby Henderson (born 28 October 1951) is a South African politician from the Northern Cape. He served in the National Assembly from 2004 to 2005 and then in the Northern Cape Provincial Legislature from 2005 to 2007. He lost his position in September 2007, when he was expelled from his party, the Democratic Alliance (DA), due to his conviction on a criminal fraud charge.

== Legislative career ==
Henderson was elected to the National Assembly in the 2004 general election; with Maans Nel, he was one of the DA's two representatives in the Northern Cape constituency. However, he resigned on 16 August 2005, ceding his seat to Shelley Loe, and subsequently joined the Northern Cape Provincial Legislature.

On 31 August 2007, hours before the beginning of the September floor-crossing period, the DA expelled Henderson from the party, meaning that he also lost his legislative seat. The DA said that his position had been terminated because of his conviction on a fraud charge: in 2006, the Kimberley Magistrate's Court had convicted him and two others of misusing funds belonging to the University of the North West. The Cape High Court rejected Henderson's application to have his expulsion overturned.
