= Nyembe =

Nyembe is a South African surname. Notable people with the surname include:

- Dorothy Nyembe (1931–1998), South African activist and politician
- Jeremia Nyembe, South African retired Air Force general
- Kanon Nyembe (born 1946), South African politician
- Nandi Nyembe (1950–2025), South African actress
- Sabelo Nyembe (born 1991), South African soccer player

== See also ==
- Nyembezi, a South African surname
