= Len Joubert =

South African politician

Member of the National Assembly
- In office 23 April 2004 – May 2009

Personal details
- Born: Leonardus Kolbé Joubert; 31 August 1948 (age 77)
- Citizenship: South Africa
- Party: Democratic Alliance (since September 2005)
- Other political affiliations: Inkatha Freedom Party (until September 2005)

Leonardus Kolbé "Len" Joubert (born 31 August 1948) is a South African politician who served in the National Assembly from 2004 to 2009. He was a member of the Inkatha Freedom Party (IFP) until September 2005, when he crossed the floor to the Democratic Alliance (DA).

== Legislative career ==
Joubert was elected to the National Assembly in the 2004 general election, ranked 12th on the IFP's national party list. The following year, the Mail & Guardian reported that he was being "wooed" by the DA, another opposition party, and he indeed defected to the DA during the floor-crossing period of September 2005. He later called floor-crossing a "revolting measure" and supported making it illegal.

Serving the rest of his term under the DA's banner, he was the party's spokesman on justice. In that capacity, he sponsored a private member's bill to amend the National Prosecuting Authority Act in order to legislate a role for the Judicial Service Commission in appointing the National Director of Public Prosecutions, which in terms of existing law was a presidential prerogative.

== Later career ==
In the 2009 general election, Joubert stood for re-election to the National Assembly, but he was listed third on the DA's party list for Mpumalanga and the party won only two seats in the province. In 2021, he was shortlisted for appointment to the South African Human Rights Commission.
