= Carl Greyling =

South African politician

Member of the National Assembly
- In office June 1999 – May 2009
- Constituency: Western Cape

Personal details
- Citizenship: South Africa
- Party: African National Congress (since 2005); New National Party (until 2005)

Carl Heinrich Friederich Greyling is a South African politician who represented the Western Cape in the National Assembly from 1999 to 2009. He was the chief whip of the New National Party (NNP) until September 2005, when he crossed the floor to the African National Congress (ANC).

== Legislative career ==
In the 1999 general election, Greyling was elected to an NNP seat in the National Assembly, representing the Western Cape constituency. He was re-elected to his seat in the 2004 general election and served as the NNP's chief whip in the assembly.

Months after the election, in October 2004, he and seven other NNP members announced that they intended to defect from the party to the ANC during the next floor-crossing period. Greyling said that he had made his decision in consultation with local party members and after studying the Freedom Charter and the national Constitution. He officially remained an NNP member until 1 September 2005, when, at the outset of the 2005 floor-crossing window, he formally joined the ANC.
