= Ramphele =

Ramphele is a surname. Notable people with the surname include:

- Mamphela Ramphele (born 1947), South African politician
- Tshepiso Ramphele, South African lawyer and politician
