= Johnny Schippers =

South African politician (1943–2009)

Member of the National Assembly
- In office 26 August 2005 – May 2009
- Constituency: Western Cape
- In office 14 August 2000 – April 2004
- Constituency: Western Cape

Personal details
- Born: Johannes Schippers; 29 June 1943 Tulbagh, Cape Province; Union of South Africa
- Died: 31 January 2009 (aged 65) Western Cape, South Africa
- Party: African National Congress (since September 2005)
- Other political affiliations: New National Party (until September 2005)
- Education: University of South Africa; University of the Western Cape

Johannes "Johnny" Schippers (29 June 1943 – 31 January 2009) was a South African politician from the Western Cape. A former teacher, he served in the National Assembly from 2000 to 2004 and from 2005 to 2009. He was a member of the New National Party (NNP) until September 2005, when he crossed the floor to the African National Congress (ANC).

== Early life ==
Schippers was born on 29 June 1943 in Tulbagh in the former Cape Province. He held a BA from the University of South Africa and a BEd from the University of the Western Cape, and he was a teacher and school principal by profession. He represented the National Party, the NNP's forerunner, as a local councillor in Tulbagh from 1995 to 1999.

== Legislative career: 2000–2009 ==
In the 1999 general election, Schippers stood for the NNP as a candidate for election to the National Assembly's Western Cape caucus, but he was not initially elected. Instead, he joined the assembly on 14 August 2000, replacing Abe Williams. He served as the NNP's spokesman on safety and security during the legislative term that followed.

Schippers was not immediately re-elected in the 2004 general election and again joined the legislature during the legislative term, replacing Cecil Herandien on 26 August 2005. By then, NNP leader Marthinus van Schalkwyk had announced the NNP's intention to disband. The week after being sworn in, during the floor-crossing window, Schippers followed van Schalkwyk and most of the NNP's other representatives in resigning from the NNP and joining the governing ANC. He served the rest of the term under the ANC banner.

== Personal life ==
Schippers was married. He died on 31 January 2009 in a car accident while travelling home to Tulbagh from the ANC's regional constituency office in Worcester.
