= Vincent Gore =

South African politician (born 1972)

Member of the National Assembly
- In office June 1999 – May 2009

Personal details
- Born: Vincent Charles Gore; 23 November 1972 (age 53)
- Citizenship: South Africa
- Party: African National Congress
- Other political affiliations: Independent Democrats; Democratic Alliance; Democratic Party

Vincent Charles Gore (born 23 November 1972) is a South African politician who served in the National Assembly from 1999 to 2009. He represented the Democratic Party (DP) and Democratic Alliance (DA) during his first term, but was elected to his second term under the banner of the Independent Democrats (ID). In September 2007, he crossed the floor from the ID to the African National Congress (ANC).

== Early life and career ==
Gore was born on 23 November 1972. He grew up in Sandton, a wealthy suburb of Johannesburg. He was an engineer by profession and began using a wheelchair after a car accident in 1996.

== Legislative career: 1999–2009 ==
=== Democratic Party: 1999–2004 ===
In the 1999 general election, Gore was elected to represent the DP (later the DA) in the Gauteng caucus of the National Assembly. His constituency was Alexandra in Johannesburg. He was viewed as a liberal politician and was the party's spokesperson for the disabled.

=== Independent Democrats: 2004–2007 ===
In the run-up to the 2004 general election, a leaked copy of the DA's party list suggested that Gore had been placed in an unelectable position. In the final version of the list, Gore was promoted only one rank, from 29th to 28th on the party's regional list for Gauteng. In the aftermath, Gore resigned from the DA and joined the ID; when the election was held in 2004, he was re-elected to the National Assembly from the ID's national list.

During the legislative term that followed, Gore represented the ID as a member of the parliamentary delegation that observed the 2005 Zimbabwean parliamentary elections. The ID withdrew from the delegation in mid-March, with Gore describing it as "a farce and a waste of taxpayers' money", given that "it is quite clear that the upcoming Zimbabwean elections are not going to be free and fair". The leader of the delegation, Mbulelo Goniwe of the ANC, later argued that Gore should compensate Parliament for the costs of his travel since he had absconded voluntarily.

=== African National Congress: 2007–2009 ===
During the 2005 floor-crossing window, the Mail & Guardian reported that Gore was resisting advances from the DA, which wanted him to return to his former party. However, during the next floor-crossing window in September 2007, Gore resigned from the ID and defected to the ANC. ID leader Patricia de Lille later dismissed Gore's criticism of her leadership style, describing him as "a serial floor-crosser". Gore left the National Assembly after the 2009 general election.
