= Paul Zondo =

South African politician (born 1949)

Member of the National Assembly
- In office 2 December 2008 – May 2009
- In office until April 2004
- Constituency: Gauteng

Personal details
- Born: 4 March 1949 (age 77)
- Citizenship: South Africa
- Party: African National Congress

Ramalepa Paulus Zondo (born 4 March 1949) is a South African politician from Gauteng. He represented the African National Congress (ANC) in the National Assembly until 2009.

== Legislative career ==
Zondo was born on 4 March 1949. He was not initially elected to the National Assembly in the 1994 general election, but filled a casual vacancy during the legislative term that followed. He was re-elected to a full term in the 1999 general election, representing the Gauteng constituency. During his second term, he was a member of the Portfolio Committee on Safety and Security.

In the next general election in 2004, he was not re-elected, but he returned on 2 December 2008 to fill the casual vacancy created by Mampe Ramotsamai's resignation. He left Parliament six months later after the 2009 general election.

== Personal life ==
He is married and has children.
