= Mofihli Likotsi =

South African politician

Member of the National Assembly
- In office 23 April 2004 – May 2009

Personal details
- Citizenship: South Africa
- Party: African Transformation Movement
- Other political affiliations: Pan Africanist Congress; African People's Convention

Mofihli Thomas Likotsi is a South African politician who served in the National Assembly from 2004 to 2009. A former secretary-general of the Pan Africanist Congress (PAC), he represented the PAC in Parliament until September 2007, when he, with Themba Godi, crossed the floor to the African People's Convention (APC). Likotsi subsequently rejoined the PAC, but in 2019 he joined the African Transformation Movement (ATM).

== Early life and career: 2004 ==
During apartheid, Likotsi was an activist for the PAC in the former Orange Free State. At the Truth and Reconciliation Commission in 1997, a Security Branch police officer applied for amnesty for having assaulted Likotsi.

By the time of that hearing, Likotsi was chairman of the PAC in the post-apartheid Free State province. In subsequent years, he worked as a businessman and also represented the ANC as a local councillor in Bloemfontein. In August 2002, his office at the PAC's headquarters in Botshabelo were raided by the police, but it was not clear why. In June 2003, Likotsi was elected as national secretary-general of the PAC, serving alongside PAC president Motsoko Pheko and deputy president Themba Godi. In later years, he was considered a possible candidate to succeed Pheko as party president.

== Legislative career: 2004–2009 ==
In the 2004 general election, Likotsi was elected to a PAC seat in the National Assembly. During the 2007 floor-crossing window, his colleague in the PAC caucus, Themba Godi, announced that he had left the PAC in order to establish his own party, the APC. As media predicted, Likotsi announced the following day that he would follow Godi to the APC. He formally joined the party on 6 December 2007 and served the rest of the legislative term under the APC banner.

He left Parliament after the 2009 general election and subsequently returned to the PAC, running unsuccessfully for election on the PAC ticket in 2014. In 2019, he joined the ATM and ran unsuccessfully for election on the ATM ticket, ranked first on the party's regional list for the Free State.
