= Ntombikayise Twala =

South African politician

Member of the National Assembly
- In office 28 February 2007 – 6 May 2014
- Constituency: Eastern Cape
- In office until April 2004

Personal details
- Born: 6 May 1953 (age 72)
- Citizenship: South Africa
- Party: African National Congress

Ntombikayise Margaret Twala (born 6 May 1953) is a South African politician who represented the African National Congress (ANC) in the National Assembly from 2007 to 2014, serving the Eastern Cape constituency. She had first joined the assembly during the first post-apartheid Parliament but had lost her seat in 2004. She is a former member of the national executive committee of the ANC Women's League.

== Legislative career ==
Twala was born on 6 May 1953. Although she was not initially elected to Parliament in South Africa's first post-apartheid elections in 1994, she was sworn into a seat during the legislative term that followed, filling a casual vacancy in the National Assembly. She was re-elected to a full term in the 1999 general election. During this period, she was also a member of the national executive committee of the ANC Women's League.

In the next general election in 2004, Twala was not re-elected. During her subsequent hiatus from Parliament, the Scorpions reported in August 2004 that she was among the many MPs who were under investigation for the abuse of parliamentary travel vouchers in what became known as the Travelgate scandal.

She was not ultimately charged with any misconduct, and on 28 February 2007, she rejoined the National Assembly, filling a casual vacancy in the Eastern Cape caucus that had arisen after James Kati's death. After her re-election in the 2009 general election, again to the Eastern Cape caucus, the ANC appointed her as its whip in the Portfolio Committee on Agriculture, Forestry Fisheries. She stood for re-election in 2014 but was ranked 156th on the ANC's party list and did not secure a seat.
