= Dan Habedi =

South African politician

Member of the National Assembly
- In office 26 April 2004 – 7 June 2004

Personal details
- Born: Daniel Ntjammu Habedi; 22 March 1952 (age 74) Alexandra, Transvaal; Union of South Africa
- Citizenship: South Africa
- Party: Azanian People's Organisation

Daniel Ntjammu Habedi (born 22 March 1952) is a South African politician and former anti-apartheid activist. He is a former secretary-general of the Azanian People's Organisation and represented the party in the National Assembly from April to June 2004; his tenure was cut short by the Electoral Court's finding that the seat had been allocated to the wrong party.

During apartheid, Habedi was a teacher in Soweto and an activist in the Black Consciousness movement.

== Early life and activism ==
Habedi was born on 22 March 1952 in Alexandra, a township outside Johannesburg in the former Transvaal. He was one of seven siblings and his father, Herman Habedi, was a labourer. Before matriculating in Pretoria in 1970, Habedi attended school in Hammanskraal, where he became interested in anti-apartheid politics after hearing speeches by Black Consciousness leaders, Steve Biko and Barney Pityana among them. He qualified as a teacher at Hebron College in Pretoria in 1972, and he later completed a bachelor's degree in psychology and sociology at the University of South Africa in 1984.

While enrolled at Hebron College, Habedi joined the Black People's Convention (BPC), a Black Consciousness organisation. He remained active in the BPC while holding his first teaching post at Mabopane. In early 1975, while attending the SASO/BPC trial as a spectator, he was detained under the Terrorism Act and detained for two weeks at Pretoria Central Prison. Shortly afterwards, he was dismissed from his teaching post for insubordination. After that, he moved to Lofentse Secondary School in Orlando, Soweto. His tenure there coincided with the 1976 Soweto uprising, and he was a member of the Soweto Teachers' Action Committee, formed in solidarity with the uprising's student activists. In 1977, Habedi and other members of the action committee resigned from their teaching jobs.

Also in the aftermath of the uprising, the BPC and other Black Consciousness organisations were banned by the apartheid government. Instead, Habedi joined the Azanian People's Organisation (AZAPO), a new Black Consciousness grouping, after it was formed in 1978. He moved to Dobsonville for a teaching job from 1979 to 1982, and during that period, between 1980 and 1981, he was the chairperson of AZAPO's Dobsonville branch. In 1982, he returned to Soweto for a post at Orlando High School, and he was projects coordinator for AZAPO's Soweto branch from 1982 to 1983. In December 1984, he was elected to the AZAPO Central Committee for the first time when he was elected as its regional vice-president for the Transvaal.

== Legislative career ==
By the time of the 2004 general election, Habedi was secretary-general of AZAPO, by then a registered political party, and he stood as a candidate for the party in the election. Though not initially elected, he was sworn in to a seat shortly after the beginning of the term, on 26 April 2004, when Mosibudi Mangena vacated one of the party's two seats in order to become Minister of Science and Technology. However, at the time of Habedi's swearing in, AZAPO was engaged in an electoral dispute with the African Christian Democratic Party (ACDP), which claimed that the seat had been allocated to AZAPO erroneously. Habedi said that his party would uphold the rule of law and that he would cede the seat if a court agreed with the ACDP's argument.

The dispute arose from an error in vote-counting procedures in Khayelitsha, which had resulted in the Electoral Commission mistakenly allocating an additional 2,666 votes to the AZAPO, when in fact those votes belonged to the majority African National Congress (ANC). AZAPO argued that it was legally entitled to the second seat because the error had not been picked up until the election results were declared and the seat allocation finalised. However, in early June 2004, the Electoral Court concurred with the ACDP and ordered AZAPO to cede one of its seats to the ACDP. Habedi thus vacated his seat on 7 June 2004, ceding it to Selby Khumalo of the ACDP. He retained his office as AZAPO secretary-general after leaving Parliament.

== Personal life ==
As of 1978, Habedi was married to Kefilwe, a teacher, with whom he had four children.
