= Mark Lowe (politician) =

South African politician (born 1962)

Member of the National Assembly
- In office 1 October 2001 – May 2009
- Constituency: KwaZulu-Natal

Member of the KwaZulu-Natal Provincial Legislature
- In office June 1999 – 1 October 2001

Personal details
- Born: Christopher Mark Lowe; 3 April 1962 (age 64)
- Citizenship: South Africa
- Party: Democratic Alliance; Democratic Party

Christopher Mark Lowe (born 3 April 1962) is a South African politician. He represented the Democratic Party (DP) and Democratic Alliance (DA) in the National Assembly from 2001 to 2009, serving the KwaZulu-Natal constituency. Before that, he represented the DP in the KwaZulu-Natal Provincial Legislature from 1999 to 2001 and was a long-serving local councillor in Durban.

== Political career ==
Lowe served as a local councillor in Durban North for about 11 years, and he was Deputy Mayor of Durban in the mid-1990s. During his time in the latter position, he recruited John Steenhuisen, the party's future leader, to the DP. Lowe remained in the local council until the 1999 general election, when he was elected to a DP seat in the KwaZulu-Natal Provincial Legislature. During his term there, in March 2001, he was ordered out of the legislature by the Speaker after he called Lucky Gabela of the African National Congress a "liar".

On 1 October 2001, Lowe was sworn in to a seat in the KwaZulu-Natal caucus of the National Assembly, swopping seats with Omie Singh. In March the following year, he became the DA's spokesman in the Standing Committee on Public Accounts after Raenette Taljaard resigned from the committee. In the 2004 general election, the DA nominated Lowe for re-election to a full term in the National Assembly. He was re-elected, and, during the legislative term that followed, he served as the party's spokesman on labour and later on home affairs. He left Parliament after the 2009 general election.

In 2014, Lowe nominated himself to stand as the DA's candidate in a by-election in his former ward in Durban North, where the incumbent councillor, Dean Macpherson, had been promoted to a parliamentary seat. However, the party did not select Lowe, and he complained to the media that he felt "betrayed". The DA's provincial chairperson, Haniff Hoosen, said that Lowe had not submitted his application on time and was not, in any case, eligible, since he was not registered to vote in Durban. Lowe said that, though he lived in Cape Town, he owned properties in Durban.
