= Kagiso Khauoe =

South African politician

Member of the National Assembly
- In office 19 September 2007 – May 2009

Personal details
- Born: Michael Kagiso Khauoe; 23 June 1962 (age 63)
- Citizenship: South Africa
- Party: African National Congress

Michael Kagiso Khauoe (born 23 June 1962) is a South African politician. He represented the African National Congress (ANC) in the National Assembly from 2007 to 2009. He was sworn in on 19 September 2007, filling the casual vacancy that arose after Enyinna Nkem-Abonta resigned. Before entering Parliament, from 1990 to 2007, Khauoe was a taxi owner.

He later served as Mayor of Matlosana Local Municipality in the North West; he was elected to that office in 2011.
