= Vytjie Mentor =

South African politician (1963–2022)

Vytjie Mentor MP
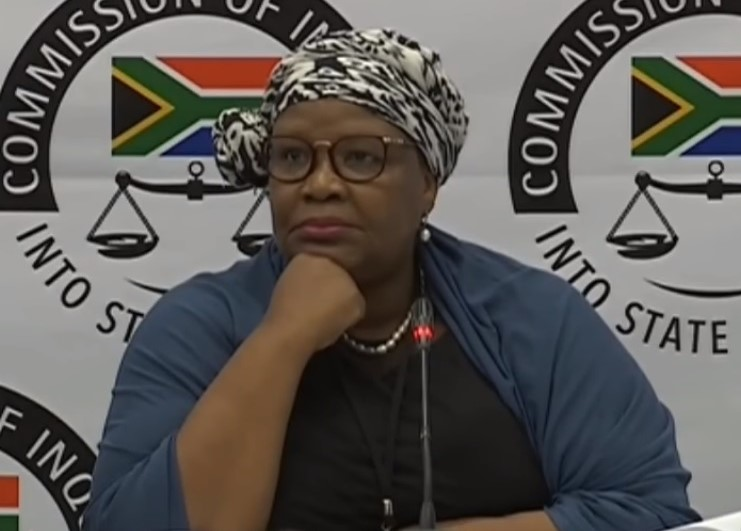
- Mentor in 2019

Chairperson of the African National Congress Parliamentary Caucus
- In office 2004–2008
- Preceded by: Joyce Kgoali
- Succeeded by: Ncumisa Chwayita Kondlo

Member of the National Assembly of South Africa
- In office 2002–2014

Personal details
- Born: Mabel Patronella Mentor; 19 October 1963
- Died: 23 August 2022 (aged 58)
- Party: ActionSA (2020–2022)
- Other political affiliations: African Christian Democratic Party (2019–2020); African National Congress (Until 2019)
- Education: University of the Witwatersrand; University of South Africa
- Profession: Politician

Mabel Patronella Mentor (19 October 1963 – 23 August 2022), known as Vytjie Mentor, was a South African politician, who served as a member of the National Assembly from 2002 until 2014. She represented the African National Congress and served as the party's caucus chairperson between 2004 and 2008. She was chairperson of the portfolio committee on public enterprises from 2009 to 2010. She is credited to be one of the first people to break ranks with the ANC and raise the alarm on state capture.

== Early life and education ==
Mabel Patronella Mentor was born on 19 October 1963 in the former Cape Province of South Africa. She matriculated from Batlhaping High School in Taung. She studied at Hebron Theological College, East Rand College, and the University of the Witwatersrand. Mentor also studied through University of South Africa.

== Parliamentary career ==
Mentor was a long-standing member of the African National Congress. She was sworn in as an MP in 2002 and was elected to her first full term in 2004. After the election, she was named as chairperson of the party's caucus, succeeding Joyce Kgoali. She held the position until 2008, when Ncumisa Chwayita Kondlo was announced as her successor.

Mentor was re-elected in 2009. The ANC then designated her to be the chairperson of the Portfolio Committee on Public Enterprises. In 2010, she accompanied president Jacob Zuma on a state visit to China. This generated controversy. The ANC launched a probe and found that Transnet had paid for her trip. She was later demoted as chairperson of the committee after it was found that she had improperly asked for sponsorship. Mentor left Parliament before the 2014 general election.

== State capture allegations ==
In March 2016, Mentor claimed that in 2010 the Gupta family, on behalf of Zuma, offered her the position of Minister of Public Enterprises, if she could arrange that South African Airways drop their Johannesburg to Mumbai route, so that Jet Airways could acquire it. She said she declined the offer, which occurred at the Guptas' Saxonwold residence, while Zuma was in another room. The family denied that the meeting took place and Zuma said he had no recollection of Mentor. In August 2018, she testified at The Judicial Commission of Inquiry into Allegations of State Capture. She was cross-examined in February 2019 after some parts of her testimony were found to be inconsistent. Mentor has defended her testimony.

In June 2022, the current Chief Justice of South Africa and the former chairperson of the State Capture Commission, Raymond Zondo said that there were too many "unsatisfactory features" in Mentor's evidence and that the meeting at the Gupta's residence, in which she alleged that a member of the Gupta family offered her the position of Minister of Public Enterprises, did not happen.

== Later career and death ==
Mentor resigned from the ANC in March 2019 and joined the African Christian Democratic Party. In July 2020, Herman Mashaba announced that Mentor had joined his new political party, ActionSA. Mentor was appointed the party's provincial chairperson in the Western Cape in October 2020.

On 12 June 2022, Mentor resigned as the party's provincial chairperson due to health-related issues. The party said that she will assume a new position in the organisation. Mentor said that her ill-health was caused by her weight loss journey. She had bariatric surgery to lose weight but after she injured her leg, she gained weight again. She was later diagnosed with candidiasis.

On 23 August 2022 her family reported that she had died after a long illness.

== Publications ==
- Mentor, Vytjie (2017). No Holy Cows: Moments in My Political Life: 2002–2017. ISBN 9780620763141
