= Nyembezi =

Nyembezi is a surname. Notable people with the surname include:

- Nonkululeko Nyembezi-Heita (born 1960), South African engineer and businesswoman
- Sibusiso Nyembezi (1919–2000), South African writer

== See also ==
- Nyembe, a South African surname
