= Martin Stephens (politician) =

South African politician

Member of the National Assembly
- In office 23 April 2004 – May 2009

Member of the House of Assembly

Assembly Member for Florida
- In office 1970–1974

Personal details
- Born: 23 September 1945 (age 80)
- Citizenship: South Africa
- Party: Democratic Alliance (since September 2005)
- Other political affiliations: United Democratic Movement; United Party

Martin Stephens (born 23 September 1945) is a South African politician who served in the National Assembly from 2004 to 2009. He was the finance spokesperson for the United Democratic Movement (UDM) until September 2005, when he crossed the floor to the Democratic Alliance (DA). He formerly represented the United Party in the apartheid-era House of Assembly.

== Early life and career ==
Stephens was born on 23 September 1945. He joined the House of Assembly in 1970 when he was elected to represent the constituency of Florida outside Johannesburg. He was the youngest MP in the house at the time and held his seat until 1974.

== Post-apartheid career ==
In the 2004 general election, Stephens was elected to a seat in the National Assembly, ranked fourth on the UDM's national party list. He served as the UDM's spokesman on finance. However, during the floor-crossing period of September 2005, he left the UDM and defected to the DA. He spent the rest of the legislative term under the DA's banner, serving as the party's spokesman on public enterprises. He did not stand for re-election in 2009.
