= Cecil Herandien =

South African politician (born 1951)

Member of the National Assembly
- In office December 2001 – 1 August 2005
- Constituency: Western Cape

Member of the Western Cape Executive Council for Housing
- In office until 5 December 2001
- Succeeded by: Nomatyala Hangana

Personal details
- Born: Cecil Bernard Herandien; 8 March 1951 (age 75)
- Citizenship: South Africa
- Party: New National Party; National Party

Cecil Bernard Herandien (born 8 March 1951) is a retired South African politician who represented the New National Party (NNP) in the National Assembly from 2001 to 2005. Before that, he served in the Western Cape Provincial Parliament, where he was Member of the Executive Council (MEC) for Housing.

== Western Cape Provincial Parliament ==
During the first democratic Parliament, Herandien served in the Western Cape Provincial Parliament and as the provincial MEC for Housing. He retained both positions after the 1999 general election. In addition, on 12 November 2001, Herandien was sworn in as Acting Premier of the Western Cape after the incumbent, Gerald Morkel, quit acrimoniously; Herandien had formerly acted in the office while Morkel was abroad.

On 5 December 2001, Peter Marais was elected permanently as Premier, and he announced that Nomatyala Hangana of the African National Congress would succeed Herandien as MEC for Housing.

== National Assembly ==
Shortly after the Western Cape reshuffle, Herandien left the Western Cape to fill an NNP seat in the National Assembly. He was elected to a full term in the assembly in the 2004 general election, serving the Western Cape constituency. Shortly after the election, the NNP announced its plans to disband, with its representatives fated to cross the floor to the governing African National Congress. Weeks before the scheduled floor-crossing, on 1 August 2005, Herandien resigned from his seat; he was replaced by Johnny Schippers.

== Controversy ==
Herandien's former colleague in the Western Cape, Freda Adams, alleged in a 2003 lawsuit that Herandien had intimated that she should have a ménage à trois with him and Peter Marais. Marais said of the allegation, "It is too ghastly to contemplate. I can't imagine me with Herandien together with the plaintiff. I don't have such an imagination".
