= Andrew Madella =

South African politician and activist

Member of the National Assembly
- In office 21 May 2014 – 7 May 2019
- Constituency: Western Cape
- In office 2 September 2005 – May 2009
- Constituency: Western Cape

Personal details
- Born: Andrew Frans Madella; 12 July 1962 (age 64) Cradock, Cape Province; South Africa
- Party: African National Congress
- Other political affiliations: Disabled People South Africa
- Education: Stellenbosch University; University of the Western Cape

Andrew Frans Madella (born 12 July 1962) is a South African politician, disability rights activist, and former trade unionist. A member of the African National Congress (ANC), he served the Western Cape constituency in the National Assembly from 2005 to 2009 and from 2014 to 2019.

Madella is a social worker by training and rose to political prominence as the Provincial Secretary of the Western Cape branch of the National Education, Health and Allied Workers' Union (NEHAWU), an office he held from 1998 to 2005. He is also a former secretary-general of Disabled People South Africa.

== Early life and education ==
Madella was born on 12 July 1962 in Cradock in the former Cape Province. He contracted polio as an infant and uses crutches to walk. After leaving Cradock, his family lived briefly in Prince Albert, but he grew up in Elsies River in Cape Town, where he matriculated at Uitsig Secondary School in 1982. He was involved in anti-apartheid student politics through the student representative council at his school.

Madella completed a diploma in social work at the University of the Western Cape, as well as a BPhil in policy studies and an Honours in public administration at Stellenbosch University.

== Early political career ==
During the 1980s, Madella remained active in youth and community activism in Elsies River, including through the Cape Youth Congress, the Cape Housing Areas Action Committee, and local advice offices. While working for the government as a social worker, he joined NEHAWU and served as a shop steward and then as a branch chairperson.

In April 1998, Madella left social work to take up a full-time union position as NEHAWU Provincial Secretary in the Western Cape. He held that position until May 2005, after which he was appointed as the union's parliamentary officer. During his time as NEHAWU Provincial Secretary, he also represented the ANC as a local councillor in the Western Cape after the 2000 local elections. He was also active in the South African disability rights movement through Disabled People South Africa (DPSA), an affiliate of an affiliate of Disabled Peoples' International; he served as DPSA's provincial chairperson in the Western Cape and later as its national secretary-general.

== Legislative career ==
Madella first joined the National Assembly on 2 September 2005, when he was sworn in to replace Rhoda Joemat, who had resigned in the aftermath of the Travelgate scandal. He served the Western Cape constituency.

Though he stood for re-election in 2009, he lost his seat, and he spent the duration of the 25th Parliament working outside Parliament, with stints as an official at the ANC's Luthuli House, as disability advisor at the Services Sector Education and Training Authority, as parliamentary liaison officer at the Passenger Rail Agency of South Africa, and as full-time secretary-general of DPSA.

In the 2014 general election, Madella was returned to the National Assembly, again representing the ANC in the Western Cape. He served on the Portfolio Committee on Rural Development and Land Reform and later the Portfolio Committee on Agriculture, Forestry and Fisheries. He stood for re-election in 2019 but was ranked too low on the party list to win a seat.
