= Mdudu Nene =

South African politician

Member of the National Assembly
- In office 7 August 2006 – May 2009
- Constituency: KwaZulu-Natal

Personal details
- Born: Mdudu Joshua Nene; 28 March 1948 (age 78)
- Citizenship: South Africa
- Party: African National Congress

Mdudu Joshua Nene (born 28 March 1948) is a South African politician. He represented the African National Congress (ANC) in the National Assembly from 2006 to 2009, representing the KwaZulu-Natal constituency. He was sworn in on 7 August 2006, filling the casual vacancy that arose after Vincent Mabuyakhulu's death. He stood unsuccessfully for re-election in 2009 and 2014.
