= Kegakgametse Forane =

South African politician (born 1960)

Member of the National Assembly
- In office 31 October 2008 – 6 May 2014

Personal details
- Born: 4 December 1960 (age 65)
- Citizenship: South Africa
- Party: African National Congress

Kegakgametse Sinna Forane (born 4 December 1960) is a South African politician who represented the African National Congress (ANC) in the National Assembly from 2007 to 2009. Forane was sworn in to the National Assembly on 19 September 2007, filling the casual vacancy created by Salie Manie's resignation, and did not stand for re-election in 2009.
