= Sally Nqodi =

South African politician (born 1955)

Member of the National Assembly
- In office 31 October 2008 – May 2009
- In office June 1999 – April 2004

Personal details
- Born: 16 June 1955 (age 70)
- Citizenship: South Africa
- Party: African National Congress

Sally Belvia Moiloa-Nqodi (born 16 June 1955) is a South African politician who represented the African National Congress (ANC) in the National Assembly from 1999 to 2004. She was elected in 1999 and served the Eastern Cape constituency. Though she was not initially re-elected in 2004, she returned to her seat from October 2008 to May 2009, filling the casual vacancy that arose after Essop Pahad resigned. In 2006, she was questioned during a liquidation inquiry arising from the Travelgate scandal.
