= Themba Mahlaba =

South African politician

Member of the National Assembly
- In office 24 July 2006 – May 2009

Personal details
- Born: 24 February 1963 (age 63)
- Citizenship: South Africa
- Party: African National Congress

Themba Louis Mahlaba (born 24 February 1963) is a South African politician who represented the African National Congress (ANC) in the National Assembly from 2006 to 2009. He was sworn in on 24 July 2006, filling the casual vacancy created by Cheryl Gillwald's resignation earlier that year. He did not stand for re-election in 2009.
