= Pico Gabanakgosi =

South African politician (born 1961)

Member of the National Assembly
- In office 24 July 2006 – May 2009

Personal details
- Born: Pico Shadrack Gabanakgosi; 7 February 1961 (age 65)
- Citizenship: South Africa
- Party: African National Congress

Pico Shadrack Gabanakgosi (born 7 February 1961) is a South African politician who represented the African National Congress (ANC) in the National Assembly from 2006 to 2009. He was sworn in on 24 July 2006 to fill the casual vacancy created by Samson Ndou's resignation. In the next general election in 2009, he stood for re-election as a candidate on the ANC's North West party list, but he did not win a seat.
