= Tshepiso Ramphele =

South African politician

Member of the National Assembly
- In office 23 April 2004 – 1 October 2006

Personal details
- Citizenship: South Africa
- Party: Agang South Africa; African National Congress (formerly)

Tshepiso David Humphrey Ramphele is a South African attorney and politician who represented the African National Congress (ANC) in the National Assembly from 2004 to 2006. He later left the ANC for Agang SA and in the 2014 general election was Agang's top-ranked candidate for election to the Limpopo Provincial Legislature.

Ramphele is a lawyer by profession and was admitted as an attorney of the High Court of South Africa in 1992. He has a BJuris from the University of the North and an LLB from Witswatersrand University. He was elected to represent the ANC in the National Assembly in the 2004 general election but resigned with effect from 1 October 2006; his seat was filled by Tshoganetso Gasebonwe. Afterwards he worked as municipal manager at Ngaka Modiri Molema District Municipality in the North West province from 2006 to 2009. In 2016, he was shortlisted for appointment to the office of the Public Protector.
