= Alex Chekkat Jacob =

South African politician

Member of the National Assembly
- In office 7 August 2008 – May 2009

Personal details
- Died: July 2021 (aged 68)
- Citizenship: South Africa
- Party: African National Congress

Alex Chekkat Jacob (1953/54 – July 2021) was a South African politician who represented the African National Congress (ANC) in the National Assembly from August 2008 to May 2009. He was sworn in to fill a casual vacancy in the ANC caucus.

Jacob was from Thiruvalla in Kerala, India, where he was active in the Congress Party. He settled in the Northern Cape of South Africa in the 1980s and worked as a teacher. He died in South Africa in July 2021, aged 68.
