= Mgolodi Dikgacwi =

South African politician

Member of the National Assembly
- In office 23 April 2004 – 7 May 2014

Personal details
- Citizenship: South Africa
- Party: African National Congress

Mgolodi Moses Dikgacwi is a South African politician who represented the African National Congress (ANC) in the National Assembly from 2004 to 2014, being elected in the 2004 and 2009 South African general election. During his second term, from January 2010, he served as a party whip in the Portfolio Committee on Sports and Recreation. He was listed 22nd on the ANC's regional party list for the Western Cape in the 2014 general election and did not secure re-election.

Dikgacwi was involved in civic organising in Bongolethu in the Cape Province during Apartheid.
