= Pamela Daniels =

South African politician

Member of the National Assembly
- In office 26 January 2011 – 6 May 2014
- Constituency: Gauteng
- In office 24 July 2006 – May 2009
- Constituency: Gauteng

Personal details
- Born: 18 September 1967 (age 58)
- Citizenship: South Africa
- Party: African National Congress

Pamela Nombeko Daniels (born 18 September 1967) is a South African politician who served two non-consecutive terms in the National Assembly of South Africa, from 2006 to 2009 and from 2011 to 2014. A member of the African National Congress, she served the Gauteng constituency.

== Legislative career ==
Daniels joined the National Assembly on 24 July 2006, filling the casual vacancy created by Kgaogelo Lekgoro's resignation. Although not initially re-elected in 2009, she returned to the assembly on 26 January 2011 to replace Bertha Gxowa, who died in November 2010. During her second term in the assembly, Daniels was a member of the Portfolio Committee on Defence.
