= Kanon Nyembe =

South African politician

Member of the National Assembly
- In office 7 August 2008 – May 2009

Personal details
- Born: Kanon Kenneth Mandla Nyembe; 6 June 1946 (age 79)
- Citizenship: South Africa
- Party: African National Congress

Kanon Kenneth Mandla Nyembe (born 6 June 1946) is a South African politician who represented the African National Congress (ANC) in the National Assembly from 2008 to 2009. He was sworn in on 7 August 2008 to fill the casual vacancy arising from Sithole Mshudulu's resignation. He did not stand for re-election in the next year's general election.
