= Maans Nel =

South African politician

Member of the National Assembly
- In office May 1994 – May 2009
- Constituency: Northern Cape

Personal details
- Citizenship: South Africa
- Party: Democratic Alliance (since 2003); New National Party (1997–2003); National Party (until 1997)

Adriaan Hermanus "Maans" Nel is a South African politician who served in the National Assembly from 1994 to 2009, representing the Northern Cape. He was a member of the National Party (NP) and New National Party (NNP) until March 2003, when he crossed the floor to the Democratic Alliance (DA).

== Legislative career ==
Nel was elected to the National Assembly in South Africa's first post-apartheid elections in 1994, listed on the NP's list. He remained with the NP after it was restyled as the NNP in 1997, and he won re-election to his seat under the NNP banner in 1999. However, during the March 2003 floor-crossing window, he left the NNP and joined the DA.

He was re-elected to his seat in the 2004 general election, representing the DA in the Northern Cape, and served as the DA's spokesman on land affairs. He left Parliament after the 2009 general election.
