= Mogomotsi Gumede =

South African politician (born 1943)

Member of the National Assembly
- In office April 2004 – May 2009

Personal details
- Born: 12 April 1943 (age 83)
- Citizenship: South Africa
- Party: Forum for Service Delivery
- Other political affiliations: African National Congress

Mogomotsi Mary Gumede (born 12 April 1943) is a South African politician who represented the African National Congress (ANC) in the National Assembly from 2004 to 2009. She was elected to her seat in the 2004 general election, standing as a candidate on the ANC's national list.

Gumede later left the ANC to join the Forum for Service Delivery, a minor opposition party. In the 2019 general election, the forum nominated her as a candidate for election to the National Assembly, listed ninth on the party list for the North West; however, the party did not win any seats.
