= John Henry Nash (politician) =

South African politician (born 1933)

Member of the National Assembly
- In office 7 August 2008 – May 2009
- Constituency: Eastern Cape
- In office May 1994 – April 2004
- Constituency: Eastern Cape

Personal details
- Born: 22 October 1933 (age 92)
- Citizenship: South Africa
- Party: African National Congress

John Henry Nash (born 22 October 1933) is a retired South African politician who represented the African National Congress (ANC) in the National Assembly. He served two consecutive terms from 1994 to 2004, representing the Eastern Cape constituency. Though he left Parliament after the 2004 general election, he returned for a final stint on 7 August 2008, when he was sworn in to fill the casual vacancy arising from Ncumisa Kondlo's death.
