= Papi Moloto =

South African politician

Member of the National Assembly
- In office 14 November 2008 – May 2009

Personal details
- Died: 8 October 2009
- Citizenship: South Africa
- Party: African National Congress
- Education: University of Fort Hare

Papi Otukile Moloto (died 8 October 2009) was a South African politician and former anti-apartheid activist. A veteran of Umkhonto we Sizwe (MK), he represented the African National Congress (ANC) in the National Assembly from November 2008 to May 2009.

== Anti-apartheid activism ==
Moloto became involved at politics as an undergraduate science student at the University of Fort Hare, where he joined the South African Students Organisation. After he was expelled from Fort Hare for his activism, he went into exile in late 1974, joining a group of Black Consciousness activists in Botswana. He received military training in Libya in 1975 and joined the ANC at its headquarters in Lusaka, Zambia in 1977.

== Post-apartheid political career ==
After the end of apartheid, Moloto joined the South African Navy Reserve as a rear admiral. He was also active in the MK Veterans Association.

He was sworn in to the National Assembly on 14 November 2008 amid the wave of resignations that followed Thabo Mbeki's ousting from the Presidency; he replaced former cabinet minister Thoko Didiza. He did not stand for re-election in the next year's general election.

== Personal life and death ==
He was married to Motlalepule, with whom he had children. He died on 8 October 2009 after a short illness.
