= George Lekgetho =

South African politician (born 1957)

Member of the National Assembly
- In office 2 September 2005 – 6 May 2014

Personal details
- Born: 27 June 1957 (age 68)
- Citizenship: South Africa
- Party: African National Congress

George Lekgetho (born 27 June 1957) is a South African politician who represented the African National Congress (ANC) in the National Assembly from September 2005 to May 2014.

== Legislative career: 2005–2014 ==
Lekgetho was sworn in to the National Assembly on 2 September 2005, filling the casual vacancy arising from the resignation of former Deputy President Jacob Zuma. He was elected to a full term in the assembly in the 2009 general election and served until 2014.

Lekgetho was a member of the Portfolio Committee on Arts and Culture during South Africa's preparations for hosting the 2010 FIFA World Cup. In January 2008, he was among the first public figures to suggest that prostitution should be legalised during the tournament. Though his suggestion was laughed off by other committee members, the idea later gained ground and was seriously debated by policymakers. However, Lekgetho issued a formal apology for the manner in which he had argued for legalisation – he had said that, in addition to boosting tax revenue, legalisation could reduce the incidence of rape "because we hear of many rapes, because people don't have access to them [women]".
