= Mabalana Sibuyana =

South African politician

Member of the National Assembly
- In office 23 April 2004 – May 2009

Personal details
- Born: Mabalana Willias Sibuyana; 16 October 1933 (age 92)
- Citizenship: South Africa
- Party: Inkatha Freedom Party

Mabalana Willias Sibuyana (born 16 October 1933) is a retired South African politician who represented the Inkatha Freedom Party (IFP) in the National Assembly from 2004 to 2009, gaining election in 2004. He was the party's spokesman on water affairs. In 2007, he called for routine HIV/AIDS testing to be made obligatory.
