= Lepota Sehlare =

South African politician (born 1967)

Member of the National Assembly
- In office 19 September 2007 – May 2009

Personal details
- Born: Lepota Jeffrey Sehlare; 30 September 1967 (age 58)
- Citizenship: South Africa
- Party: African National Congress

Lepota Jeffrey Sehlare (born 30 September 1967) is a South African politician who represented the African National Congress (ANC) in the National Assembly from 2007 to 2009. He was sworn in on 19 September 2007 to fill the casual vacancy arising from Frene Ginwala's resignation. He did not stand for re-election in 2009.
