= Joyce Ngele =

South African politician (1933–2024)

Member of the National Assembly
- In office 14 May 2004 – 6 May 2014

Personal details
- Born: 19 January 1933
- Died: August 2024 (aged 91)
- Party: African National Congress

Nombuyiselo Joyce Ngele (19 January 1933 – August 2024) was a South African politician who represented the African National Congress (ANC) in the National Assembly from 2004 to 2014. She was also the first black woman to serve as Mayor of Greater Pretoria.

== Political career ==
During apartheid, Ngele worked for 24 years at the United States Embassy in Pretoria, first as a receptionist and then as an administrative clerk. She was detained for five months in 1986 for her political activities. After the end of apartheid, she represented the ANC as a local councillor in Greater Pretoria until she was elected as Mayor; she vacated the mayoral office when Greater Pretoria became the Tshwane Metropolitan Municipality in 2000.

Mashishi was sworn in to the National Assembly on 14 May 2004, shortly after the 2004 general election; she filled a seat that Joyce Kgoali had declined to fill. In the next general election in 2009, she was elected to a full term in the assembly. She did not stand for re-election in 2014.

== Personal life and death ==
While in the mayoral office, Ngele was a single mother to three children. She died in August 2024, at the age of 91.
