= Bafitlhile Pule =

South African politician

Member of the National Assembly
- In office 23 April 2004 – May 2009

Personal details
- Born: Bafitlhile Edmund Pule; 2 September 1940 (age 85)
- Citizenship: South Africa
- Party: United Christian Democratic Party

Bafitlhile Edmund Pule (born 2 September 1940) is a retired South African politician from the United Christian Democratic Party (UCDP). Formerly a politician in the apartheid-era Bophuthatswana government, he was one of the UCDP's three representatives in the National Assembly between 2004 and 2009. Before that, he represented the party in the North West Provincial Legislature.
