= Violet Meruti =

South African politician

Member of the National Assembly
- In office 23 April 2004 – May 2009

Personal details
- Citizenship: South Africa
- Party: African National Congress

Maseokwane Violet Meruti is a South African politician who represented the African National Congress (ANC) in the National Assembly from 2004 to 2009. She was elected in the 2004 general election. She is a member of the ANC Veterans' League in the Northern Cape.
