= Samson Mahote =

South African politician

Member of the National Assembly
- In office 23 April 2004 – May 2009

Personal details
- Born: 23 June 1954 (age 71)
- Citizenship: South Africa
- Party: African National Congress

Samson Mahote (born 23 June 1954) is a South African politician who represented the African National Congress in the National Assembly from 2004 to 2009. He was elected in the 2004 general election, ranked 124th on the party's national party list, and was a member of Parliament's Portfolio Committee on Correctional Services. He did not stand for re-election in 2009.
