= Lolo Mashiane =

South African politician

Member of the National Assembly
- In office 6 May 2009 – 6 May 2014
- In office 23 April 2004 – 25 November 2008

Personal details
- Born: 5 June 1956 (age 69)
- Citizenship: South Africa
- Party: Congress of the People (2008–2014); African National Congress (until 2008)

Lorraine Mmakgosi "Lolo" Mashiane (born 5 June 1956) is a South African politician who served in the National Assembly from 2004 to 2008 and from 2009 to 2014. She represented the African National Congress (ANC) during her first term but defected to the Congress of the People (COPE) for her second. However, ahead of the 2014 general election, Mashiane was among several COPE members who openly denounced the party, ending her parliamentary career.

== Early life ==
Mashiane was born on 5 June 1956.

== Legislative career ==
=== African National Congress: 2004–2008 ===
She was elected to the National Assembly in the 2004 general election, standing as a candidate on the ANC's national party list. By 2008, she was additionally the spokesman for the North West branch of the ANC. However, on 25 November 2008, Mashiane resigned from the National Assembly, ceding her seat to Thandi Shongwe.

=== Congress of the People: 2008–2014 ===
After resigning, Mashiane joined COPE, a new breakaway party led by Mosiuoa Lekota and Sam Shilowa. In the 2009 general election, she returned to the National Assembly on COPE's ticket. She also served as the party's administrative whip in Parliament.

==== Suspension ====
In the prolonged leadership struggle between Lekota and Shilowa, Mashiane was firmly aligned to Shilowa, who was the party's chief whip. In May 2010, as a party elective conference approached, one of Mashiane's personal emails was leaked to the press, leading to accusations that Lekota's camp had intercepted her private communications. In the email, sent to a friend, Mashiane expressed extreme frustration with Lekota, who she said had harmed the party's prospects by "thinking that he is Cope"; she said of Lekota, "we will fight him to the bitter end".

In October 2010, Lekota's camp resolved to suspend both Shilowa and Mashiane from their positions in the parliamentary caucus. A party spokesman said that Mashiane had refused to cooperate with an audit of the party's finances by KPMG. However, both suspensions were declared invalid by the Western Cape High Court, which said that Shilowa and Mashiane had unlawfully been denied the right to respond to the charges against them. After the court ruling, Lekota denied that Shilowa and Mashiane had been removed at all, saying that they had merely been relieved of their financial responsibilities.

==== Defection ====
The party elective conference at the end of 2010 conclusively split COPE into two factions, each of which claimed to constitute COPE's legitimate leadership. Mashiane remained aligned to Shilowa's faction and was among the COPE members whom Lekota's faction purported to suspend from the party in January 2011. Although Mashiane remained with COPE after Shilowa left, serving out the remainder of her parliamentary term, she remained at odds with the Lekota-headed leadership.

In February 2014, as that year's general election approached, the Mail & Guardian reported that Mashiane would leave COPE and would instead stand in the election as a candidate for the Democratic Alliance. Instead, in the last week of the legislative term, Mashiane and other COPE members published an open letter which endorsed the ANC as the "most effective vehicle" for transforming society. The letter said that COPE had "run its course" and was disabled by "poor political leadership". Mashiane left Parliament after the election.
