= Bantutu Kekana =

South African politician

Member of the National Assembly
- In office 19 September 2007 – May 2009

Personal details
- Born: Bantutu Matthews Kekana; 14 November 1975 (age 50)
- Citizenship: South Africa
- Party: African National Congress

Bantutu Matthews Kekana (born 14 November 1975) is a South African politician. He represented the African National Congress (ANC) in the National Assembly from 2007 to 2009. He was sworn in on 19 September 2007, filling the casual vacancy that arose after Mpho Lekgoro resigned.
