= Monako Moatshe =

South African politician

Member of the National Assembly
- In office 23 April 2004 – May 2009
- Constituency: North West

Personal details
- Born: Monako Stephen Moatshe; 29 May 1942 (age 83)
- Citizenship: South Africa
- Party: African National Congress

Monako Stephen Moatshe (born 29 May 1942) is a retired South African politician who represented the African National Congress (ANC) in the National Assembly from 2004 to 2009. He was elected in 2004 to serve the North West constituency. Although he stood for re-election in 2009, he was ranked 47th on the ANC's regional party list for Gauteng and did not win a seat.
