= Sifanelo Vundisa =

South African politician

Member of the National Assembly
- In office 23 April 2004 – May 2009

Personal details
- Born: Sifanelo Shadrack Vundisa; 12 September 1957 (age 68)
- Citizenship: South Africa
- Party: African National Congress

Sifanelo Shadrack Vundisa (born 12 September 1957) is a South African politician who represented the African National Congress (ANC) in the National Assembly from 2004 to 2009. He was elected in 2004 from the ANC's national party list and vacated his seat after the 2009 general election.
