= Mokgothu Seadimo =

South African politician (born 1956)

Member of the National Assembly
- In office 31 October 2008 – May 2009

Personal details
- Born: 4 May 1956 (age 69)
- Citizenship: South Africa
- Party: African National Congress

Mokgothu Dorcas Seadimo (born 4 May 1956) is a South African politician who served in the National Assembly from 2008 to 2009. A member of the African National Congress, she was sworn in on 24 July 2006, filling a casual vacancy that was created by Ngoako Ramatlhodi's resignation in 2005. She did not stand for re-election in 2009.
