= Sakkie Jenner =

South African politician

Izak Edward "Sakkie" Jenner" is a South African politician who represented the Independent Democrats (ID) in the National Assembly from September 2007 to April 2009. Pursuant to the 2009 general election, he was elected to the Western Cape Provincial Parliament; he was ranked first on the ID's party list and only one other ID member, Brett Herron, accompanied him to the legislature. Premier Helen Zille appointed him to the Executive Council of the Western Cape.

== Personal life ==
Jenner's brother, David Jenner, is a former Mayor of Matzikama Local Municipality in the Western Cape and leads a local party, the United Democrats.
