= Richard Ntuli =

South African politician

Member of the National Assembly
- In office June 1999 – May 2009

Personal details
- Citizenship: South Africa
- Party: African National Congress (since 2005); Democratic Alliance (2000–05); Democratic Party (until 2000)

Richard Sibusiso Ntuli was a South African politician who represented Gauteng in the National Assembly from 1999 to 2009. He was first elected as a member of the Democratic Party (DP), later the Democratic Alliance (DA), but he crossed the floor to the African National Congress (ANC) in 2005. He died on 16 May 2024.

== Legislative career ==
Ntuli was elected to the National Assembly in the 1999 general election, representing the DP in the Gauteng constituency. The DP was merged into the DA in 2000, and in 2001 he was co-opted onto the DA's national management committee. He was re-elected to his legislative seat in the 2004 general election, now representing the DA in Gauteng. During the 2005 floor-crossing window, he was one of four DA members who defected to join the ANC.
