= Joe Malahlela =

South African politician

Member of the National Assembly
- In office 2002–2009

Personal details
- Born: 1972/1973 Mankweng, Transvaal; South Africa
- Died: 26 February 2011 (aged 38)
- Citizenship: South Africa
- Party: African National Congress
- Other political affiliations: South African Communist Party
- Education: University of the North

Mamaroba Johannes "Joe" Malahlela (died 26 February 2011) was a South African politician who represented the African National Congress (ANC) in the National Assembly from 2002 to 2009. A lawyer by training and a former ANC Youth League activist in Limpopo, he was appointed to the Public Service Commission in 2009.

== Life and career ==
Mamaroba was born in 1972 or 1973 in Mankweng in the former Northern Transvaal. He was active in anti-apartheid youth politics as a teenager in the 1980s, particularly as a member of the Mankweng Youth Congress. In the 1990s, he studied law at the University of the North, where he served on the student representative council and joined the South African Communist Party. He subsequently rose through the ranks of the ANC, chairing an ANC Youth League branch in Ga-Dikgale and a mainstream ANC branch in Manyoro.

He joined Parliament in 2002 at the age of 29, and he was elected to a full five-year term in the National Assembly in the 2004 general election. In March 2009, he was appointed to the Public Service Commission, where he was serving at the time of his death.

== Personal life and death ==
Malahlela died in a car accident on 26 February 2011 at the age of 38. He was married and had children.
