= Thandile Sunduza =

South African politician (born 1977)

Member of the National Assembly
- In office 14 November 2008 – 6 May 2014

Personal details
- Born: 15 November 1977 (age 48) Soweto, Johannesburg; Transvaal, South Africa
- Party: African National Congress

Thandile Babalwa Sunduza (born 15 November 1977) is a South African politician, diplomat and former civil servant who represented the African National Congress (ANC) in the National Assembly from 2008 to 2014. She was appointed as Consul-General of South Africa to the United States in 2020.

== Early life and career ==
Sunduza was born on 15 November 1977 in Soweto in Johannesburg. After matriculating in Johannesburg, she studied sports management, earning a BTech in the subject from Vaal University of Technology. Her first jobs were in sports administration at the National Olympic Committee of South Africa and the South African Table Tennis Board. Subsequently, from 2003, she worked in government, holding several positions in the Gauteng Provincial Government.

== Political career ==
On 14 November 2008, Sunduza joined the National Assembly, filling the casual vacancy that had arisen in the ANC caucus after Mosuioa Lekota's resignation. She was re-elected to a full legislative term in the 2009 general election and additionally chaired the Portfolio Committee on Arts and Culture from 2010. In 2013, there was a minor scandal when Sunduza alleged that the Johannesburg Metropolitan Police had insulted her and damaged her car; the police alleged in response that Sunduza had been apprehended driving away from a mandatory traffic stop while talking on her cellphone.

She did not stand for re-election to her legislative seat in 2014 and instead returned to her career in public administration, including as a parliamentary liaison officer for the Deputy Minister of Public Service and Administration. In the next general election in 2019, she stood for election to the National Assembly, but she was ranked 199th on the ANC's national party list and did not secure a seat. In 2020, President Cyril Ramaphosa appointed Sunduza as Consul-General of South Africa to the United States; she headed South Africa's West Coast mission, based in Los Angeles.

== Personal life ==
Sunduza is Christian and has one daughter.
