= Freda Wright =

South African politician (born 1953)

Member of the National Assembly
- In office 31 October 2008 – May 2009

Personal details
- Born: 11 July 1953 (age 72)
- Citizenship: South Africa
- Party: African National Congress

Freda Joan Wright (born 11 July 1953) is a South African politician who represented the African National Congress (ANC) in the National Assembly from 2008 to 2009. She was sworn in on 31 October 2008 amid the wave of resignations that followed Thabo Mbeki's ousting from the Presidency; she replaced former cabinet minister Sydney Mufamadi. She did not stand for re-election in the next year's general election.
