= Selby Khumalo =

South African politician (born 1971)

Member of the National Assembly
- In office 11 June 2004 – 18 May 2006

Personal details
- Born: 11 April 1971 (age 55) Mariannhill, Natal Province; South Africa
- Party: African National Congress (since September 2005); African Christian Democratic Party (until September 2005)

Mthokozisi Selby Khumalo (born 11 April 1971) is a South African politician, civil servant and Pentecostal preacher of the Apostolic Faith Mission. He served in the National Assembly from 2004 to 2006, representing the African Christian Democratic Party (ACDP) until he defected to join the African National Congress (ANC) during the 2005 floor-crossing window. He left Parliament in May 2006 and subsequently served from 2006 to 2021 as chief director for communications in the office of the Premier of KwaZulu-Natal.

== Early life and career ==
Selby was born on 11 April 1971 in Mariannhill in the former Natal province. He was the third of six siblings, with two brothers and three sisters. After completing high school, he attended theological college, completing a diploma in theology in 1994 and a Bachelor's in bible and theology in 1995. In June 1999, he was ordained as a minister of the AFM, South Africa's largest Pentecostal church, and over the next few years he served as a pastor to constituencies in KwaMhlanga, Madadeni, and Lamontville before resigning his pastoral status in March 2002.

== Parliament: 2004–2006 ==
In the 2004 general election, Khumalo stood as a candidate for election to the National Assembly on the ACDP's party list for KwaZulu-Natal. He was not initially sworn into a seat, but in June 2004 the Electoral Court ruled that the ACDP had been deprived of a seat due to a miscalculation in vote counting; one seat initially given to the Azanian People's Organisation was therefore ceded to the ACDP. Khumalo was sworn into that seat on 11 June 2004. He also served as the national spokesperson for the ACDP.

During the floor-crossing period of September 2005, Khumalo left the ACDP; on 8 September, he became a member of the ANC. In response, the ACDP said that Khumalo was a "respected and valued" member of ACDP but that his decision did not reflect the will of the voters. He resigned from the National Assembly on 18 May 2006 and his seat was filled by Manana Florence Tlake of the ANC.

== Later career ==
Khumalo resigned from the National Assembly in order to take up office as chief director for communications in the office of the Premier of KwaZulu-Natal, a position held at that time by the ANC's S'bu Ndebele. He rejected suggestions that the job was a reward for his defection in 2005. He remained in the position from 2006 until 2021; he also served as head of religious affairs in the provincial government from 2009 to 2010.

At the same time, Khumalo was reinstated as an AFM pastor in March 2015 and was assigned an assembly in Durban. In November 2021, he was elected as general secretary of the AFM and left the Premier's office to take up the position.

== Personal life ==
He married Elizabeth Khumalo (née Ratau) in April 1997; they have three children.
