= Lucky Kgabi =

South African politician

Member of the National Assembly
- In office 14 November 2008 – May 2009

Personal details
- Citizenship: South Africa
- Party: African National Congress

Lucky Mpho Kgabi is a South African politician who represented the African National Congress (ANC) in the National Assembly from November 2008 to May 2009. He was sworn in to replace Kgalema Motlanthe, who ceded his seat after being elected President, and he vacated the assembly after the 2009 general election.

In 2018, Kgabi emerged as a prominent figure in an overt campaign to oust Supra Mahumapelo, then the Premier and ANC Provincial Chairperson in the North West Province. He was a founder and leader of the Revolutionary Council, a civil society group – officially non-partisan, but dominated by ANC members – which arranged protests against Mahumapelo's administration and purported to collect information about Mahumapelo's misconduct in office. After Mahumapelo was removed during violent protests, he sued Kgabi and two other leading members of the group for R10 million, alleging that they had defamed him.
