= George Madikiza =

South African politician

Member of the National Assembly
- In office until May 2009

Personal details
- Born: George Tembela Madikiza; 16 August 1953 (age 72)
- Citizenship: South Africa
- Party: African National Congress (since 2011)
- Other political affiliations: United Democratic Movement (until 2011)

George Tembela Madikiza (born 16 August 1953) is a South African politician who represented the United Democratic Movement (UDM) in the National Assembly. He joined during the second democratic Parliament and served as the UDM's spokesman on foreign affairs and then as the party's chief whip. He was elected to his first full term in the assembly in the 2004 general election.

Madikiza was deputy provincial chairperson of the UDM in the Eastern Cape in 2011, when it was announced that he had left the party to defect to the governing African National Congress.
