= Sphetho Asiya =

South African politician (d. 2010)

Member of the National Assembly
- In office 23 April 2004 – June 2009
- Constituency: Northern Cape

Personal details
- Died: October 2010
- Citizenship: South Africa
- Party: African National Congress

Sphetho Enoch Asiya (died October 2010) was a South African politician who represented the African National Congress (ANC) in the National Assembly from 2004 to 2009 and in the Northern Cape Provincial Legislature from 1994 to 2004.

Asiya was involved in anti-apartheid activism before 1994. After the 1994 general election, South Africa's first under universal suffrage, he spent two terms in the Northern Cape Provincial Legislature. In the 2004 general election, he was elected to an ANC seat in the National Assembly, representing the Northern Cape constituency. He died in October 2010.
