= Wilson Ngcobo =

South African politician

Member of the National Assembly

Assembly Member for KwaZulu-Natal
- In office 7 August 2006 – May 2009

Personal details
- Citizenship: South Africa
- Party: National Religious Freedom Party
- Other political affiliations: African National Congress (2005–15); Democratic Alliance (2000–05); Democratic Party (until 2000)

Ndawoyakhe Wilson Ngcobo is a South African politician who served in the KwaZulu-Natal Provincial Legislature from 1999 to 2006 and from 2009 to 2014. In the interim, he served briefly in the National Assembly from 2006 to 2009. He was a member of the Democratic Party (DP), later the Democratic Alliance (DA), until September 2005, when he crossed the floor to join the African National Congress (ANC). In 2015, he left the ANC to establish the National Religious Freedom Party, a KwaZulu-Natal-based party of which Ngcobo is president.

== Political career ==
In the 1999 general election, Ngcobo was elected to the KwaZulu-Natal Provincial Legislature, ranked fifth on the DP's provincial party list. He was re-elected to his seat in 2004 under the DP's successor party, the DA. However, during the 2005 floor-crossing window, he announced that he had left the DA to join the ANC. He said that he was attracted by the ANC's progressivism, saying that, "Some of the white people in the party think the DA is there to serve white people's interests only".

On 7 August 2006, the ANC sent him to the National Assembly, where he filled a casual vacancy in the ANC caucus. In the 2009 general election, he was returned to the KwaZulu-Natal Provincial Legislature, where he served until the next general election in 2014. In 2015, he left the ANC to form the NRFP. The party contested the 2019 provincial election in KwaZulu-Natal, with Ngcobo ranked first on the party list, but it did not win any seats.
