= Sello Dithebe =

South African politician

Member of the National Assembly
- In office 2 September 2005 – May 2009
- In office 1 May 2000 – April 2004

Personal details
- Citizenship: South Africa
- Party: African National Congress

Sello Leon Dithebe is a South African politician who represented the African National Congress (ANC) in the National Assembly from 2000 to 2004 and from 2005 to 2009. He is a former Provincial Secretary of the ANC's Free State branch and in 2023 was appointed as spokesman to the Premier of the Free State, Mxolisi Dukwana.

== Political career ==
Dithebe was Provincial Secretary of the ANC's Free State branch from 1997 to 1998 under Provincial Chairperson Zingile Dingani. He was sworn into the National Assembly for the first time on 1 May 2000, filling a casual vacancy in an ANC seat. He was not initially re-elected at the end of the legislative term in 2004, but he returned to the assembly on 2 September 2005, filling another casual vacancy.

During his second term in the National Assembly, in 2008, Dithebe clashed with ANC Provincial Chairperson Ace Magashule after he and another ANC politician, Vax Mayekiso, took the Free State ANC to court, alleging that there had been electoral irregularities in party elective conferences which had the effect of blocking Magashule's opponents from regional leadership positions. Dithebe said that he had been blocked from the leadership of the Lejweleputswa regional branch. Both he and Mayekiso were suspended from party activities on the grounds that their involvement in the court applications transgressed the party's rules, and they also sought to challenge their suspensions in court.

In 2018, Dithebe was again closely involved in an unsuccessful court challenge that attempted to block that year's ANC provincial elective conference, again alleging irregularities by Magashule's supporters. He made a political comeback in January 2023 when he was elected to the Provincial Executive Committee of the Free State ANC. He was subsequently appointed as spokesman to Mxolisi Dukwana, the newly elected ANC Provincial Chairperson after Dukwana took office as Premier of the Free State the following month.
