= Lucky Gabela =

South African politician

Member of the KwaZulu-Natal Legislature
- In office May 2009 – May 2014

Member of the National Assembly
- In office 23 April 2004 – 15 May 2006
- Constituency: KwaZulu-Natal

Personal details
- Born: Lucky Sifiso Gabela; 31 May 1968 (age 57)
- Citizenship: South Africa
- Party: African National Congress
- Other political affiliations: Congress of the People (2009–2014)

Lucky Sifiso Gabela (born 31 May 1968) is a South African politician from KwaZulu-Natal. He represented the African National Congress (ANC) in the National Assembly from 2004 to 2006 before defecting to the Congress of the People (COPE) ahead of the 2009 general election. Although he represented COPE in the KwaZulu-Natal Provincial Legislature from 2009 to 2014, he returned to the ANC in 2014.

== Early life and activism ==
Born on 31 May 1968, Gabela was active in anti-apartheid politics in Umlazi during his youth.

== Post-apartheid political career ==
=== African National Congress ===
He represented the ANC in the KwaZulu-Natal Provincial Legislature during the latter part of the 23rd Parliament, and in 2004 he was elected to a seat in the National Assembly. However, he resigned from his seat on 15 May 2006 and was replaced by Wilson Ngcobo. He went on to serve as an advisor to former KwaZulu-Natal Premier S'bu Ndebele.

=== Congress of the People ===
Ahead of the 2009 general election, Gabela defected from the ANC to COPE, a newly formed breakaway party. He was announced as the party's candidate for election as Premier of KwaZulu-Natal. Though he was not elected as Premier in 2009, he became COPE's sole representative in the KwaZulu-Natal Provincial Legislature.

After a single term in the legislature, and ahead of the 2014 general election, Gabela announced on 30 April 2014 that he would not seek re-election with COPE but would instead return to the ANC. The press linked his decision to his closeness with the faction of COPE led by Mbhazima Shilowa, which was losing its battle with Mosiuoa Lekota's faction. Gabela said of his decision:

I have decided to return to the ANC after seeing that there was no peace in COPE. I am not seeking any position and I have not been promised anything. Today I am correcting the mistake I made when I joined COPE, not knowing that I was putting myself into a dictatorship.
