= Mwelo Nonkonyana =

South African politician and traditional leader (born 1957)

Inkosi Mwelo Nonkonyana

Member of the National Assembly
- In office June 1999 – 6 May 2014

Personal details
- Born: 15 November 1957 (age 68)
- Citizenship: South Africa
- Party: African National Congress

Mwelo Nonkonyana (born 15 November 1957) is a South African politician, sports administrator, and Pondo traditional leader. He is currently serving as provincial chairperson of the Congress of Traditional Leaders of South Africa (Contralesa) in the Eastern Cape, an office which he formerly held from 1991 to 2008. He is also a former vice-president of the South African Football Association (SAFA).

Serving since 1993 as the chief of the amaBhala clan, Nonkonyana was the inaugural chairperson of the Eastern Cape House of Traditional Leaders from 1996 to 1999. Between 1999 and 2014, he represented the African National Congress (ANC) for three terms in the National Assembly. During the same period, he remained active in his Contralesa office, as well as in SAFA.

Often a controversial figure, Nonkonyana was expelled from Contralesa in October 2009 and from SAFA in October 2014. In July 2020, he was additionally fired as chairperson of the Eastern Cape House of Traditional Leaders, an office to which he had returned in 2017. Although his efforts to return to SAFA failed, he was re-admitted to Contralesa in 2017 and resumed the provincial chairmanship in March 2022.

== Early life and legislative career ==
Born on 15 November 1957, Nonkonyana is the traditional leader or chief of the amaBhala, a Pondo clan in the Eastern Cape. He inherited that position, a lifetime appointment, in 1993. He entered mainstream national politics ahead of the 1999 general election, when he announced that he would stand as a candidate on the ANC's party list. At that time he was the provincial chairman of Contralesa in the Eastern Cape and the chairman of the Eastern Cape House of Traditional Leaders.

When the election was held in June 1999, Nonkonyana was elected to an ANC seat in the Eastern Cape caucus of the National Assembly. He served three consecutive terms in the seat, gaining re-election in 2004 and 2009, although from 2004 onwards he was elected off the national party list rather than in a provincial constituency. He left Parliament after the 2014 general election.

== Traditional leadership politics ==
=== Contralesa ===
Nonkonyana was a prominent figure in Contralesa and served as its provincial chairman in the Eastern Cape from 1991 to 2008. However, he was expelled from Contralesa in October 2009 after he refused to accept the results of a provincial election in which he had been replaced as the organisation's provincial leader. As a result of his expulsion, he also lost his office as national general-secretary of Contralesa.

In November 2014, Contralesa reinstated Nonkonyana's membership after he apologised for the dispute of five years earlier. He was later co-opted to the provincial leadership of the body and appointed as its acting provincial secretary in the Eastern Cape. Nonkonyana said that he had "decided not to be in the forefront of politics but instead dedicate the remaining years of my life to traditional leadership and ensure that it was holding the necessary centre-stage on governance". In March 2022, he was elected to return to his former position as chairperson of Contralesa in the Eastern Cape.

=== House of Traditional Leaders ===
Nonkonyana was the inaugural chairperson of the Eastern Cape House of Traditional Leaders from 1996 to 1999. In September 2017, he was elected to return to that position, narrowly beating Thanduxolo Magadla in a vote.

However, he was suspended from office during the early months of the COVID-19 pandemic, when Xolile Nqatha, provincial minister for traditional affairs, alleged that he had violated lockdown regulations, including by organising a large family funeral in April 2020. In addition, he was accused of having continued to practice full-time as a lawyer while serving as chairman, an allegation that Nonkonyana denied. Nonetheless, on 31 July 2020, the house passed a motion of no confidence in Nonkonyana, judging that he had brought the house into disrepute; he was thus demoted to become an ordinary member of the house. He challenged the decision in court.

=== Political views ===
In his personal and organisational capacities, Nonkonyana has held strong views about the governance of traditional leadership matters. He is a longstanding and fierce opponent of the government's policy of regulating ritual circumcision practices; he argued that the policy created scope for women and uncircumcised men to become involved in the institutions of circumcision, which he argued was "an affront to our own culture" and unconstitutional. In the summer of 2005, after 18 boys died from circumcision-related injuries, Nonkonyana proposed that the deaths were the result of "the wrath of ancestors" who were displeased that the government was interfering in the ritual.

Nonkonyana was a strong supporter of the highly controversial Traditional Courts Bill. In 2018, he warned Parliament that land reform should not involve plans to expropriate land currently owned by traditional authorities; he said that such a programme would make the government "successors to colonialists" and suggested that traditional leaders would "take up arms" against the policy if necessary.

== South African Football Association ==
In parallel to his career in traditional leadership and legislative politics, Nonkonyana was active in soccer administration. He was regional president of SAFA in the O. R. Tambo region until October 2010, when he withdrew his re-election bid amid a contest with challenger Felix Majeke; Majeke said that he would be appointed as honorary life president of the branch. Simultaneously, Nonkonyana was a longtime national vice-president of SAFA. In that capacity, he chaired SAFA’s local organising committee ahead of the 2013 Africa Cup of Nations.

In addition, as SAFA vice-president, he was closely identified with the Football Transformation Forum, led by Danny Jordaan, which came to dominate SAFA in the early 2000s in opposition to such figures as Irvin Khoza. The forum engineered Kirsten Nematandani's ascension to the presidency in 2009, and in September 2013, it engineered Jordaan's ascension; Jordaan was elected to succeed Nematandani as president, and Nonkonyana was re-elected to his final term as vice-president.

=== Expulsion: 2014 ===
Less than a month after his re-election, SAFA announced that it had suspended Nonkonyana from his office because of public remarks he had made about the future of Gordon Igesund, the incumbent coach of Bafana Bafana. Speaking about Igesund's role ahead of the 2014 African Nations Championship, Nonkonyana had been quoted as saying, "Clearly Chan 2014 must be the start of the brighter future for Bafana Bafana. It's either the coach will come to us and do an honourable thing and say thanks I played my part, I failed and I think it's time to go home, before being asked by us." Given that, prima facie, this statement violated Safa's policies, he was suspended pending a full disciplinary inquiry.

Nonkonyana challenged his suspension in court, an approach that was highly unpopular with his colleagues. In October 2014, a SAFA congress in Sandton resolved to expel Nonkonyana from the association entirely, for having "violated football's fundamental constitution [by] taking football matters to the courts of law".

=== Attempted return: 2018 ===
In January 2018, Nonkonyana announced that he would run against Jordaan for the SAFA presidency in March. SAFA organisers objected, pointing to his expulsion from the body three years earlier, but Nonkonyana insisted that he had been expelled as SAFA vice-president, not as a SAFA member. He lost a related court battle in March 2018, and SAFA’s national executive formally resolved to ban Nonkonyana for life.

== Personal life ==
He is married to Shuki Nonkonyana. One of their daughters died in a car accident shortly before he was installed as chief in 1993, and one of their sons died in September 2015 after being stabbed near an unlicensed tavern in Mthatha. The family's royal home, at Enkululekweni in KwaBhala village outside Flagstaff, was damaged in a fire in July 2020.
