= Agnes Mashishi =

South African politician (born 1961)

Member of the National Assembly
- In office 31 October 2008 – 6 May 2014

Personal details
- Born: 11 March 1961 (age 65)
- Citizenship: South Africa
- Party: African National Congress

Agnes Christin Mashishi (born 11 March 1961) is a South African politician who represented the African National Congress (ANC) in the National Assembly from 2008 to 2014. From 2009 onwards, she served the Limpopo constituency.

== Legislative career ==
Mashishi was sworn in to the National Assembly on 31 October 2008 following a large wave of resignations in the ANC caucus, occasioned by the resignation of President Thabo Mbeki. Mashishi filled the seat vacated by former Deputy President Phumzile Mlambo-Ngcuka. In the next general election in 2009, she was elected to a full term in the assembly, now in the Limpopo caucus rather than off the national party list. She did not stand for re-election in 2014.
