= Kenneth Khumalo =

South African politician and civil servant

Member of the National Assembly
- In office 23 April 2004 – May 2009

Personal details
- Citizenship: South Africa
- Party: African National Congress

Kenneth Kayilo Khumalo is a South African politician and civil servant who represented the African National Congress (ANC) in the National Assembly from 2004 to 2009, having been elected in the 2004 general election. As of 2020, he worked at the provincial Department of Cooperative Governance and Traditional Affairs in the Northern Cape government.

In 1985, Khumalo was one of the Upington 26 charged with participating in the murder of policeman Jetta Sethwala during an anti-apartheid protest in the township of Paballelo, Upington in the Cape Province. He was accused number one in the subsequent murder trial, which saw him and thirteen others convicted on the basis of the common purpose doctrine and sentenced to the death penalty. He was on death row in May 1991 when the sentence was overturned on appeal.
