= Tuelo Anthony =

South African politician

Member of the National Assembly
- In office 23 April 2004 – June 2009

Personal details
- Citizenship: South Africa
- Party: African National Congress

Tuelo Gibson Anthony is a South African politician who represented the African National Congress (ANC) in the National Assembly from 2004 to 2009. He was elected to his seat in the 2004 general election, representing the North West constituency.
