= Doris Sikosana =

South African politician (1942–2023)

Member of the KwaZulu-Natal Legislature
- In office May 2009 – May 2014

Member of the National Assembly
- In office 14 November 2008 – May 2009

Personal details
- Born: 1942 Highflats, Natal Province; Union of South Africa
- Died: 2023 (aged 80–81)
- Citizenship: South Africa
- Party: African National Congress

Ntombizodwa Doris Sikosana (1942–2023), also spelled Sikhosana, was a South African politician and former anti-apartheid activist from KwaZulu-Natal. She represented the African National Congress (ANC) in the National Assembly from 2008 to 2009 and in the KwaZulu-Natal Legislature from 2009 to 2014.

== Political career ==
Sikosana was born in 1942 in Highflats in the former Natal Province. During apartheid, she was a member of the ANC underground and later joined the party in exile. After the ANC was unbanned in 1990, she was elected to the National Executive Committee of the ANC Women's League.

She was sworn in to the National Assembly on 14 November 2008 amid the wave of resignations that followed Thabo Mbeki's ousting from the Presidency; she replaced former cabinet minister Aziz Pahad. In the next year's general election, she was elected to an ANC seat in the KwaZulu-Natal Legislature.

== Personal life and death ==
Sikosana had two sons, Thulasizwe and Funizwe. She died in 2023 and was granted a special official provincial funeral, which included speeches by Nkosazana Dlamini-Zuma, Vusi Dube, Zweli Mkhize, and Lungi Gcabashe.
