= Felix Fankomo =

South African politician

Member of the National Assembly
- In office 31 October 2008 – May 2009
- In office May 1994 – April 2004

Personal details
- Citizenship: South Africa
- Party: African National Congress

Felix Christopher Fankomo is a South African politician who represented the African National Congress (ANC) in the National Assembly from 1994 to 2004 and later from 2008 to 2009. He was first elected in the 1994 general election and was re-elected to a second term, representing the Limpopo constituency, in 1999. He left the assembly after the 2004 general election but returned on 31 October 2008, when he was sworn in to fill a casual vacancy arising from Ronnie Kasrils's resignation.
