= National Alliance (South Africa) =

Political party in South Africa

The National Alliance (NA) is a South African political party that competed in the Western Cape province for the South African 2009 provincial election.

The party failed to win any seats.

== Election results ==
=== Provincial elections ===
Election	Eastern Cape		Free State		Gauteng		Kwazulu-Natal		Limpopo		Mpumalanga		North-West		Northern Cape		Western Cape	
Election	%	Seats	%	Seats	%	Seats	%	Seats	%	Seats	%	Seats	%	Seats	%	Seats	%	Seats
2009	-	-	-	-	-	-	-	-	-	-	-	-	-	-	-	-	0.10	0/42
