= Mampe Kotsi =

South African politician

Member of the National Assembly
- In office 6 May 2009 – 6 May 2014
- In office June 1999 – 2 December 2008

Personal details
- Born: 18 June 1955 (age 71)
- Citizenship: South Africa
- Party: African National Congress
- Other party: Congress of the People (2008–2014)

Cecilia Mampe Papadi Kotsi (born 18 June 1955), formerly known as Mampe Ramotsamai, is a South African politician who served in the National Assembly from 1999 to 2008 and from 2009 to 2014. During her first term, she represented the African National Congress (ANC), which she had also formerly represented in the Western Cape Provincial Parliament.

In December 2008, Kotsi resigned from Parliament to defect to the opposition Congress of the People (COPE), which she went on to represent until 2014. Ahead of the 2014 general election, she disowned the party and campaigned for the ANC.

== Career in the ANC ==
Born on 18 June 1955, Kotsi joined the ANC in 1983 and during apartheid was detained for her political activism. After the end of apartheid, and until 1999, she represented the ANC in the Western Cape Provincial Parliament, where she was Deputy Speaker. She was accused of misappropriating constituency funds in 1999 but was cleared in an internal party disciplinary process in 2001.

=== National Assembly: 1999–2008 ===
Kotsi represented the ANC in the National Assembly from 1999 to 2008, gaining election in 1999 and 2004.

In March 2001, the police's organised crime unit raided Kotsi's home in Goodwood, Cape Town after receiving a tip-off; they seized about 20,000 Mandrax tablets, with a street value of about R800,000, from two cars parked in her yard. Three people were arrested, including a friend of Kotsi's, but Kotsi herself was not at home during the raid; the police said that there would be further investigation but that she was not considered a suspect. The ANC said that she was cooperating fully with the investigation and knew nothing about the drug consignment; that weekend, the party formally adopted a resolution which reaffirmed the presumption of innocence but warned that any ANC member "who is found guilty of drug trafficking, will be immediately expelled".

== Career in COPE ==
=== Defection: 2008 ===
On 2 December 2008, Kotsi resigned from the ANC and therefore lost her seat in the National Assembly. She was the second ANC Member of Parliament to leave the party to join COPE, a new breakaway party which had been established by former ANC members. Like COPE's founders, Kitso expressed her dismay about the ANC's decision to force Thabo Mbeki to resign from the presidency. She said that she was also disappointed by the ANC's decision to disband the Scorpions and by inflammatory public statements by ANC Youth League leader Julius Malema. In addition, she approved of COPE's stance that "social grants are not sustainable and the long-term plan should actually be to invest in education". She said that the ANC "has lost its soul and moral fibre":

I realised that the ANC I joined in 1983 is wearing out. It is [now] an organisation of individuals. It has been difficult to defend some of the things in the party. In the Western Cape the ANC is looking inward, not outward. If this is the route the ANC is taking then I have no future.

=== National Assembly: 2009–2014 ===
In the next general election in 2009, Kotsi was returned to the National Assembly, now on the COPE party list. During the legislative term that followed, she was affected by the ongoing power struggle between COPE's two founders, Mosiuoa Lekota and Sam Shilowa: when the party split after a contested elective congress, she was associated with the Shilowa camp, and she was one of seven senior members whom the Lekota camp purported to expel from the party in March 2011.

Nonetheless, Kotsi remained a member of the party until the 2014 general election. A week before the election, in late April 2014, she was one of 19 COPE members who signed a public statement disowning COPE as no longer presenting "a credible alternative" to the ANC; instead the members promised to campaign for the ANC as "the most effective vehicle" for service-delivery and transformation. The Lekota camp said that those who signed the letter had either been paid by the ANC or – because they were aligned to Shilowa – had not properly renewed their memberships and therefore were ineligible to stand for re-election under the COPE banner:

Most of the people on the list of 19 are unemployable outside of politics, so they decided to knock on the door of another political party because they came to the end of their employment at COPE. They were very, very happy to continue to collect huge salaries based on their association to COPE and waited until the last week to change – that speaks volumes about the character of those people.

Kotsi did not stand for re-election to the National Assembly in 2014.
