= Ofentse Mogale =

South African politician (1963–2022)

Member of the National Assembly
- In office 14 May 2004 – May 2009

Personal details
- Born: Ohentse Moses Mogale; 26 December 1963
- Died: 22 March 2022 (aged 58)
- Citizenship: South Africa
- Party: African National Congress

Ohentse Moses Mogale (26 December 1963 – 22 March 2022), commonly spelled Ofentse Mogale, was a South African politician from the North West. He represented the African National Congress (ANC) in the National Assembly from 2004 to 2009. After that, he was mayor of the North West's Matlosana Local Municipality from 2010 to 2011.

== Life and career ==
Mogale was not initially elected to the National Assembly in the 2004 general election but was sworn in shortly after the election, taking up a seat that had been declined by Billy Nair. He did not stand for re-election in 2009.

Instead, in 2010, Mogale was elected as Executive Mayor of Matlosana Local Municipality after the incumbent, China Dodovu, resigned. He served in the mayoral office until the 2011 local elections. Thereafter, he represented the ANC as a councillor in the Dr Kenneth Kaunda District Municipality, where he was serving at the time of his death.

Mogale died on 22 March 2022 shortly after being diagnosed with cancer.
