= Shelley Loe =

South African politician (born 1958)

Member of the National Assembly
- In office 17 August 2005 – May 2009
- Constituency: Northern Cape

Delegate to the National Council of Provinces

Assembly Member for Northern Cape
- In office April 2004 – 15 July 2005

Member of the Gauteng Provincial Legislature
- In office June 1999 – April 2004

Personal details
- Born: 7 December 1958 (age 67)
- Citizenship: South Africa
- Party: Democratic Alliance; Democratic Party

Shelley Joy Loe (born 7 December 1958) is a South African politician who represented the Democratic Alliance (DA) in Parliament from 2004 to 2009. Before that, she represented the Democratic Party (DP) in the Gauteng Provincial Legislature from 1999 to 2004.

== Political career ==
Loe was formerly a local politician for the DP in Gauteng. In May 1998, she became ward councillor for Brakpan in a by-election, in which she won a resounding 78 per cent of the vote against the National Party's Malcolm Laing. In the 1999 general election, she left Brakpan to join the Gauteng Legislature, representing the DP. The Mail & Guardian said that she continued to play a key role in organising her party's by-election campaigns in Gauteng.

After a single term in the provincial legislature, she was elected to the National Council of Provinces in the 2004 general election. She was a member of the Northern Cape caucus and represented the DA, the DP's successor party. A year into the legislative term, in July 2005, Loe resigned from the National Council of Provinces; the following month, on 17 August 2005, she was sworn in to the National Assembly, where she filled a casual vacancy, again in the DA's Northern Cape caucus.

Loe left Parliament after the 2009 general election and subsequently represented the DA as a proportional-representation councillor in Gauteng's Ekurhuleni Metropolitan Municipality, where she led the DA's caucus. She stood for election as DA deputy provincial chairperson in Gauteng in 2014. In 2019, she supported Mike Waters's unsuccessful campaign in the contest to succeed James Selfe as chair of the DA federal council.
