= South African Youth Congress =

South African youth organization

SAYCO symbol

The South African Youth Congress (SAYCO) was a pro-African National Congress (ANC) youth organization, active in the struggle against Apartheid. The organization was formed in 1987. The motto of SAYCO was "Victory is Certain - Freedom or Death". In 1990, SAYCO merged with the ANC Youth League.

Peter Mokaba was ultimately elected ANCYL President following the merging of SAYCO and ANCYL.
