= Vincent Mabuyakhulu =

South African trade unionist (1958–2006)

Member of the National Assembly
- In office 14 May 2004 – 12 July 2006
- Constituency: KwaZulu-Natal

Personal details
- Born: 20 November 1958
- Died: 12 July 2006 (aged 47) Durban, KwaZulu-Natal
- Citizenship: South Africa
- Party: African National Congress
- Other political affiliations: South African Communist Party; Congress of South African Trade Unions
- Relations: Mike Mabuyakhulu (brother) John Mabuyakhulu (brother) Dan Mabuyakhulu (brother)

Vincent Mabuyakhulu (20 November 1958 – 12 July 2006) was a South African politician and trade unionist from KwaZulu-Natal. He was Vice President of the National Union of Metalworkers of South Africa (Numsa), one of the largest affiliates of the Congress of South African Trade Unions (Cosatu). Later, he represented the African National Congress (ANC) in the National Assembly from May 2004 until his death in July 2006.

== Early life and union career ==
Born on 20 November 1958, Mabuyakhulu came from a family of trade unionists: his brothers John, Dan, and Mike were also prominent activists. His Zulu clan name was Ndiyema. His involvement in the trade union movement began in 1985, when he was elected as a shop steward for the Metal and Allied Workers Union (Mawu), one of Numsa's forerunners, at his workplace, Lennings Manganese, in the KwaZulu bantustan. He was also secretary of Mawu's local branch in Isithebe.

In 1988, Mabuyakhulu was elected as chairperson of Numsa's regional branch in Northern Natal, a position he held until 1993, when he was elected as the union's national Second Vice President, deputising Mthuthuzeli Tom. He was promoted to First Vice President in 1996 and was elected to a second term in that office in 2000; he also served on the Cosatu Central Committee. During the same period, Mabuyakhulu was active in both of Cosatu's Tripartite Alliance partners: he was secretary of the ANC's local branch in Mandeni in the late 1990s, and he was a longstanding district chairperson for the South African Communist Party.

== Legislative career ==
On the first of may 2004, shortly after the 2004 general election, Mabuyakhulu was sworn in to an ANC seat in the National Assembly, replacing Ebrahim Ebrahim. He was a member of Parliament's Portfolio Committee on Water Affairs and Forestry. While serving in the seat, he died on 12 July 2006 in Durban after a short illness.
