= Tshoganetso Tongwane =

South African politician (died 2021)

Member of the National Assembly of South Africa
- In office 10 June 2019 – 19 May 2021
- Preceded by: Susan Shabangu
- Succeeded by: Michael Masutha
- In office 30 May 2014 – 7 May 2019
- Preceded by: Max Sisulu
- In office 2008 – 6 May 2014

Personal details
- Died: 19 May 2021
- Party: African National Congress

Tshoganetso Mpho Adolphina Tongwane (died 19 May 2021) was a South African politician. An African National Congress member, she was appointed to the National Assembly in 2008. She was elected to a full term in parliament at the 2009 election. She served until the 2014 election when she lost her seat. Tongwane returned to parliament a few weeks later, filling the seat of former speaker Max Sisulu. She lost her seat again at the 2019 election, only to be appointed back to parliament a couple of weeks later.

== Background ==
Tongwane grew up in a politically active family. Her political career began in the 1980s when she joined the United Democratic Front and later the African National Congress.

== Parliamentary career ==
Tongwane joined the National Assembly in 2008 before the 2009 general election. She was elected to a full term in the election, despite the ANC losing support. She was then appointed to serve on the Home Affairs and Human Settlements portfolio committees. Tongwane was the ANC's constituency contact for the party's Kathu constituency office for the Fourth Parliament (2009 to 2014).

She stood for re-election in the May 7, 2014 election as 124th on the ANC's national list of parliamentary candidates for the National Assembly. She was not re-elected to the National Assembly as a result of the ANC's electoral decline. On 29 May 2014, former speaker Max Sisulu resigned his seat in the assembly. The ANC selected Tongwane to fill his seat as she was next on the list and she was sworn in on 30 May. Tongwane was then assigned to the Agriculture, Forestry and Fisheries and Labour portfolio committees.

Tongwane stood for another term in parliament in the May 8, 2019 general election, having been placed in the 116th position on the ANC's national list. Once again, she was not re-elected to the National Assembly due to the ANC's support declining even further at the polls. Former Social Development minister Susan Shabangu resigned as a member of the National Assembly after she was not reappointed to the cabinet. The ANC chose Tongwane to take up her seat and she was sworn in on 10 June 2019. On 27 June, Tongwane was named to the Portfolio Committee on Environment, Forestry and Fisheries. Tongwane was a Backbencher during her three terms in parliament.

== Death ==
Tongwane died from COVID-19 on 19 May 2021, at age 65.

== See also ==
- List of members of the National Assembly of South Africa who died in office
