= Ncumisa Kondlo =

South African politician and activist

Ncumisa Chwayita Kondlo
- Born: 27 August 1958
- Died: 24 March 2008 (aged 49)
- Education: University of Fort Hare, Rhodes University
- Occupations: Activist, politician

Ncumisa Chwayita Kondlo (27 March 1958 – 24 March 2008) was a South African politician and activist. She was member of the African National Congress and deputy chairperson and a member of the Central Committee of the South African Communist Party.

== Biography ==
Kondlo was born on 27 March 1958. She attended the University of Fort Hare and Rhodes University.

She was a political activist who lived through the Apartheid regime and saw, first-hand, the sub-standard living conditions of her countrymen.

A partial list of organizations she was involved in includes the African National Congress (ANC), the South African Communist Party, the Azanian Students’ Organisation, and the South African Youth Congress.

Kondlo served as Member of the Executive Council (MEC) for Welfare in the Eastern Cape Provincial government.

She died on 24 March 2008. At the time of her death she was Chairperson of the ANC Caucus in Parliament.

== See also ==
- List of members of the National Assembly of South Africa who died in office
