= James Kati =

South African politician (1924–2006)

Member of the National Assembly
- In office 3 July 2001 – 29 September 2006

Personal details
- Born: Zamiwonga James Kati; 4 January 1924 Luheweni, Ngcobo; Cape Province, Union of South Africa
- Died: 29 September 2006 (aged 82)
- Party: African National Congress
- Nickname: Castro

Zamiwonga James Kati (4 January 1924 – 29 September 2006) was a South African politician and anti-apartheid activist who represented the African National Congress (ANC) in the National Assembly until his death in 2006. He joined the ANC in 1949 and was a member of the Umkhonto we Sizwe underground in the Transkei.

== Early life and activism ==
Kati was born on 4 January 1924 in Luheweni, a village in Ngcobo in the former Cape Province. He joined the ANC in Cape Town in 1949 and was first arrested in 1952 during the Defiance Campaign. After the ANC was banned by the apartheid government in 1960, he became a leading member of its underground in the region that became the Transkei bantustan. He also joined the ANC's armed wing, Umkhonto we Sizwe, where he was known by the nom de guerre Castro.

He was detained for his political activities on several occasions and was imprisoned on Robben Island between September 1964 and July 1971. He served another six-year prison sentence in the 1980s. After the democratic transition, he testified to the Truth and Reconciliation Commission that he had been severely tortured while in detention.

== Legislative career ==
Kati was not initially elected to Parliament in South Africa's first post-apartheid elections in 1994, but he joined the National Assembly during the legislative term that followed, filling a casual vacancy in the ANC's caucus. He was not immediately re-elected in the next general election in 1999 but returned on 3 July 2001, filling the casual vacancy that had arisen when Smangaliso Mkhatshwa was elected Mayor of Tshwane in 2000. Kati was re-elected in 2004, representing the Eastern Cape constituency, and at the time of his death, aged 82, he was the oldest serving Member of Parliament.

== Personal life and death ==
Kati's wife died during apartheid while he was imprisoned. He was hospitalised in Umtata in 2006 and died on 29 September. ANC deputy president Jacob Zuma spoke at his funeral.
