= Sithole Mshudulu =

South African politician (1949–2021)

Member of the National Assembly
- In office June 1999 – 25 July 2008

Personal details
- Born: Sithole Assistance Mshudulu; 12 August 1949
- Died: 30 May 2021 (aged 71)
- Citizenship: South Africa
- Party: African National Congress

Sithole Assistance Mshudulu (12 August 1949 – 30 May 2021) was a South African politician who represented the African National Congress (ANC) in the National Assembly from 1999 to 2008. He later represented the ANC as a local councillor in Gauteng, including as Mayor of Emfuleni Local Municipality.

== Early life and career ==
Mshudulu was born on 12 August 1949. He entered politics through the Congress of South African Trade Unions in the former Transvaal and was also active in the South African National Civics Organisation.

== Career in government ==
Mshudulu was elected to the National Assembly in the 1999 general election and was re-elected to a second term in 2004. He represented the Gauteng constituency during his first term, but for his second term stood as a candidate on the ANC's national party list. He resigned from the assembly on 25 July 2008.

After resigning, Mshudulu served as Mayor of Emfuleni. Thereafter he represented the ANC as a local councillor in the Sedibeng District Municipality, where he was chief whip from 2016 until his death.

== Personal life and death ==
Mshudulu was married to Modikoe Mshudulu and had two Children namely Matshidiso and Monde Mshudulu. He was admitted to hospital on 16 May 2021 after being diagnosed with COVID-19 and died of related illness on 30 May.
