= Enyinna Nkem-Abonta =

South African politician

Member of the National Assembly of South Africa
- In office 2004–2009

Personal details
- Born: Nigeria
- Party: Libertarian Party (2013)
- Other political affiliations: African National Congress (2005–Unknown); Democratic Alliance (until 2005)
- Education: Paris Dauphine University (PhD)

Enyinna Nkem-Abonta is a Nigerian-born South African retired politician who was elected to the National Assembly of South Africa in the 2004 general election as a member of the Democratic Alliance. He resigned from the DA in 2005 and joined the African National Congress. Nkem-Abonta left parliament at the 2009 general election.

== Early life and education ==
Nkem-Abonta was born in Nigeria. He moved to South Africa in 1994 after receiving a doctorate in applied economics from the Paris Dauphine University in France. He worked as the policy and research head for Ntsika, the Financial and Fiscal Commission and the KwaZulu-Natal treasury department. Before he was elected to parliament, he taught economics at the University of Pretoria.

== Political career ==
In the 2004 general election he was elected as a Democratic Alliance Member of Parliament to the National Assembly in Cape Town. He was appointed the DA's shadow minister for trade and industry. During a debate on Black Economic Empowerment in September 2004, Deputy Minister Lulu Xingwana told Nkem-Abonta to go home where "millions of black people" needed him and that he "should not have run away" from his own country. Nkem-Abonta dismissed his xenophobic run-in with Xingwana as "just politics".

After Raenette Taljaard resigned as a DA MP in late 2004, he took over as shadow finance minister. Nkem-Abonta crossed the floor during the 2005 floor-crossing window period and joined the African National Congress. Nkem-Abonta then served as an ANC MP until the 2009 general election when he left parliament.

In 2013, Nkem-Abonta assisted with the creation of the Libertarian Party of South Africa.
