= Independent Democrats =

- President: Patricia de Lille
- Secretary-General: Haniff Hoosen
- Chairperson: Mervyn Cirota
- Founder: Patricia de Lille
- Founded: 21 June 2003
- Dissolved: 2014
- Split from: Pan Africanist Congress
- Merged into: Democratic Alliance
- Headquarters: Cape Town, Western Cape
- Youth wing: Young Independent Democrats
- Ideology: Social liberalism Populism
- Political position: Centre
- Colours: Orange
- Slogan: Be a Part of the Solution

The Independent Democrats (ID) was a South African political party, formed by former Pan Africanist Congress member Patricia de Lille in 2003 via floor crossing legislation. The party's platform was premised on opposition to corruption, with a mixture of liberal principles and strategies for improving equity. The party's strongholds were the Northern and Western Cape.

On 15 August 2010, the party announced plans to merge with the larger Democratic Alliance as part of a plan to challenge the governing African National Congress (ANC). The party disbanded as a separate political organization in 2014.

== 2009 election manifesto ==
Ahead of the national elections in 2009, the ID launched a manifesto promising that, if elected to power, they would increase the staffing of the South African Police Service to 200,000, enlist 5,000 caseworkers to operate in crime-stricken communities, make South Africa a leader in renewable energy and finance a minimum social grant by taxing luxury goods, tobacco and alcohol. In addition they vowed that an "ID government would fire a minister whose department received a qualified audit two years in a row."

== Merger with DA ==
In 2010, then-ID leader Patricia de Lille formalized an agreement to merge with the Democratic Alliance. The two parties merged by 2014. Due to this, the ID did not contest the 2011 local elections as a separate entity, instead fielding its candidates on the DA's ballots. In February 2012, the-then Leader of the Official Opposition, Lindiwe Mazibuko, reshuffled her shadow cabinet, which included appointing members of the ID to shadow portfolios for the first time. This was seen as a move towards strengthening the co-operation between the two parties heading towards the completion of the merger.

== Election results ==
=== National elections ===
Election	Votes	%	Seats
2009	162,915	0.92	4
2004	269,765	1.70	7

=== Municipal elections ===
Election	Votes	%
2006	530,912	2.0%

== See also ==
- Liberalism in South Africa
