= Floor crossing (South Africa) =

Legislation under which politicians could change parties in South Africa

Floor crossing was a system introduced to the post-apartheid South African political system in 2002, under which members of Parliament, members of provincial legislatures and local government councillors could change political party (or form a new party) and take their seats with them when they did so. Floor crossing in South Africa was abolished in January 2009.

== History ==
Floor crossing was controversial because since 1994, elections in South Africa generally use party-list proportional representation, with voters voting for a political party rather than an individual candidate. Floor crossing allowed politicians elected in that way to change parties, with the possible result that the post-crossing composition of the elected bodies no longer represented the preferences of voters.

Floor crossing legislation was initially requested by the Democratic Party and the New National Party in November 2001 as a means of formalising their unification into the Democratic Alliance. The African National Congress, which held the power in the legislature to change the constitution, then did not favour the measure, as it perceived the DA initiative to be a "congealing of a race and class based political opposition." However, when the NNP leadership announced its desire to leave the DA and to form alliances with the ANC in 2001, the ANC passed the legislation. The chairman of the ANC, Mosiuoa Lekota, stated that the party's reasons for the legislation was "for some political realignment... and the break-up of racial power blocks."

Floor crossing was originally enabled by amendments to the Constitution of South Africa and other legislation passed by Parliament. The amendments removed clauses requiring members of the National Assembly to give up their seats if they changed parties. According to the void amendments, floor crossing was permitted only twice in an electoral term, during the second and fourth years after the general elections, from 1 to 15 September.

The United Democratic Movement (UDM) unsuccessfully challenged the constitutionality of floor crossing. A bill to amend the constitution to again prevent politicians from keeping their seats when joining other parties, dubbed "crosstitutes", was tabled in Parliament in 2008 in consequence of the ANC decision at its December 2007 National Congress in Polokwane to reject floor crossing.

The bill was passed by Parliament, and floor crossing was subsequently abolished when President Kgalema Motlanthe assented to the constitutional amendment on 6 January 2009. As a result of the amendment, if any politician ceases to be a member of the party which they were elected under, they subsequently lose their seat in Parliament.

Seats gained and lost
Party	2003 result	2005		2007	
Party	2003 result	gained	lost	gained	lost
African National Congress (ANC)	+9	+14	0	+4	0
Democratic Alliance (DA)	+8	+2	−5	0	0
Inkatha Freedom Party (IFP)	−3	−5	0	0	0
New National Party (NNP)	−8	−7	0	—	—
African Christian Democratic Party (ACDP)	+1	−3	0	—	0
United Democratic Movement (UDM)	−10	—	−3	—	0
Freedom Front Plus (FF Plus)	0	0	0	0	0
United Christian Democratic Party (UCDP)	0	0	0	0	0
Pan Africanist Congress of Azania (PAC)	−1	0	0	0	−2
African Independent Movement (AIM)	+1	—	—	—	—
Alliance for Democracy and Prosperity (ADP)	+1	—	—	—	—
Azanian People's Organisation (Azapo)	0	0	0	0	0
Independent Democrats (ID)	+1	0	−2	0	−1
Minority Front (MF)	0	0	0	0	0
National Action (NA)	+1	—	—	—	—
Afrikaner Eenheidsbeweging	−1	—	—	—	—
Peace and Justice Congress (PJC)	+1	0	—	0	—
National Democratic Convention (Nadeco)	—	+4	0	0	0
United Independent Front (UIF)	—	+2	0	0	−2
United Party of South Africa (UPSA)	—	+1	0	0	−1
Federation of Democrats (FD)	—	+1	0	0	0
Progressive Independent Movement (PIM)	—	+1	0	0	−1
African People's Convention (APC)	—	—	—	+2	0
National Alliance (NA)	—	—	—	+1	0

Parties that gained floor crossers include the African National Congress (ANC), Democratic Alliance (DA), New National Party (NNP), Sport Party, Inkatha Freedom Party (IFP), Phumelela Ratepayers Association, Potchefstroom Inwonersvereniging, Breedevallei Onafhanklik, and the Universal Party

Five parties were created by floor crossing in 2003, including the Independent Democrats (ID) and the New Labour Party (NLP); in 2005, the National Democratic Convention (Nadeco) and Progressive Independent Movement (PIM).

== In practice ==
Generally speaking, the ruling ANC benefited the most from the system, but other parties also managed to gain seats from it. The ANC and other large parties benefited the most from floor crossing because of a clause in the legislation that required ten percent of a party's caucus to cross the floor before any one member could cross. As such, it was far easier for public representatives of small parties to cross the floor since they needed to collude with fewer of their colleagues. If there were fewer than ten members in a caucus, the ten percent clause effectively allowed each member to cross the floor unilaterally.

== Criticism and controversy ==
The system was the source of much controversy, with many commentators arguing that it disenfranchised voters, by effectively allowing politicians to 'reallocate' votes as they saw fit. Other critics of floor crossing also argued that it lent itself to bribery and corruption. The official opposition, the Democratic Alliance, has pointed out that during the 2002 floor crossing window period in Cape Town, 87% of National Party Councillors that crossed to the ANC were appointed to a position with a better salary.

Floor crossing was particularly controversial since South African MPs are elected by proportional representation and are nominated by political parties on a closed party list before general elections. Voters thus vote for a political party, rather than for an individual MP. However, floor crossing allowed MPs to change parties, with the possible result that the composition of the elected bodies no longer represented the original vote count.

In a 15 January 2006 interview with the South African Press Association, the president of the Inkatha Freedom Party, Mangosuthu Buthelezi, said, "Floor-crossing is like the HI virus because it robs the political system of all honour, holding political parties hostage by rendering them unable to discipline their own members. It allows the emergence of careerists, self-serving politicians, which are a very strange breed because they do not honour the sanctity of the vote cast in the ballot box."

In 2005 the African Christian Democratic Party (ACDP) stopped accepting floor-crossers: "Floor-crossing is an absolute mockery of parliamentary democracy and results in deception, suspicion, accusation and 'cheque-book' politics."

== List of Parliamentary floor crossings ==
- 2003
- 2005
- 2007

== See also ==
- Crossing the floor
- Party switching
- Waka-jumping
