= 2005 South African floor-crossing window period =

The 2005 floor crossing window period in South Africa was a period of 15 days, from 1 to 15 September 2005, in which members of the National Assembly and the provincial legislatures were able to cross the floor from one political party to another without giving up their seats. The period was authorised by the Tenth Amendment of the Constitution of South Africa, which scheduled regular window periods in the second and fourth September after each election. The previous general election had been held on 14 April 2004.

In the National Assembly, the floor-crossing expanded the African National Congress' (ANC) representation from 279 to 293 seats, giving it control of almost three-quarters of the 400-member house. Other existing parties mainly lost seats, with several entirely new parties being created; still-existing parties created in 2005 include the National Democratic Convention

Seven of the nine provincial legislatures were also affected, with only the Free State and North West legislatures remaining unchanged. In both the KwaZulu-Natal Provincial Legislature and the Western Cape Provincial Parliament the ANC received enough members to move from a plurality to an absolute majority; in KwaZulu-Natal it gained two members to control 40 of the 80 seats, while in the Western Cape it gained five, to give it 24 of the 42 seats.

This window period also saw the final demise of the New National Party, in which all its members crossed the floor, mostly to become ANC representatives.

The tables below show all the changes; in those provinces not listed there was no change in the provincial legislature.

== Tables ==
=== National Assembly ===
Party	Seats before	Net change	Seats after
ANC	279	+14	293
DA	50	−3	47
IFP	28	−5	23
UDM	9	−3	6
ID	7	−2	5
ACDP	7	−3	4
VF+	4	0	4
National Democratic Convention (Note: Party created during this floor-crossing period.)		+4	4
PAC	3	0	3
UCDP	3	0	3
MF	2	0	2
United Independent Front		+2	2
AZAPO	1	0	1
Federation of Democrats		+1	1
Progressive Independent Movement		+1	1
United Party		+1	1
NNP (Note: The New National Party officially dissolved itself during this floor-crossing period, with most of its representatives becoming African National Congress representatives.)	7	−7	
Total	400		

=== Eastern Cape Provincial Legislature ===
Party	Seats before	Net change	Seats after
ANC	51	0	51
DA	5	0	5
UDM	6	−2	4
United Independent Front		+2	2
PAC	1	0	1
Total	63		

=== Gauteng Provincial Legislature ===
Party	Seats before	Net change	Seats after
ANC	51	0	51
DA	15	−3	12
IFP	2	0	2
Federal Alliance	0	+2	2
ACDP	1	0	1
VF+	1	0	1
ID	1	0	1
PAC	1	0	1
Alliance of Free Democrats		+1	1
United Independent Front		+1	1
UDM	1	−1	0
Total	73		

=== KwaZulu-Natal Provincial Legislature ===
Party	Seats before	Net change	Seats after
ANC	38	+2	40
IFP	30	−3	27
DA	7	−2	5
National Democratic Convention		+4	4
MF	2	0	2
ACDP	2	−1	1
UDM	1	0	1
Total	80		

=== Limpopo Provincial Legislature ===
Party	Seats before	Net change	Seats after
ANC	45	0	45
DA	2	0	2
ACDP	1	0	1
United Independent Front		+1	1
UDM	1	−1	0
Total	49		

=== Mpumalanga Provincial Legislature ===
Party	Seats before	Net change	Seats after
ANC	27	0	27
DA	2	0	2
Christian Party		+1	1
VF+	1	−1	0
Total	30		

=== Northern Cape Provincial Parliament ===
Party	Seats before	Net change	Seats after
ANC	21	+3	24
DA	3	0	3
ID	2	−1	1
ACDP	1	0	1
VF+	1	0	1
NNP	2	−2	
Total	30		

=== Western Cape Provincial Parliament ===
Party	Seats before	Net change	Seats after
ANC	19	+5	24
DA	12	+1	13
ACDP	2	0	2
United Independent Front		+2	2
ID	3	−2	1
UDM	1	−1	0
NNP	5	−5	
Total	42		

=== National Council of Provinces ===
The National Council of Provinces was reconstituted as a result of the changes in the provincial legislatures. Its reconstituted makeup was as follows:

Party	Delegate type	EC	FS	G	KZN	L	M	NW	NC	WC	Total	
ANC	Permanent	4	4	4	3	5	5	4	4	3	36	68
ANC	Special	4	4	3	2	4	4	4	4	3	32	68
DA	Permanent	1	1	1	1	1	1	1	1	2	10	12
DA	Special			1						1	2	12
IFP	Permanent			1	2						3	4
IFP	Special				1						1	4
ID	Permanent								1		1	
VF+	Permanent		1								1	
UCDP	Permanent							1			1	
UDM	Permanent	1									1	
United Independent Front	Permanent									1	1	
National Democratic Convention	Special				1						1	
Total		10	10	10	10	10	10	10	10	10	90	

== See also ==
- Floor crossing (South Africa)
- 2003 South African floor-crossing window period
- 2007 South African floor-crossing window period
