= List of National Assembly members of the 25th Parliament of South Africa =

Members of the National Assembly of the 25th South African Parliament
←	24th	26th	→

Overview
- Term: 6 May 2009 – 7 May 2014
- Election: 22 April May 2019
- Party control: African National Congress

This article lists the members of the National Assembly of South Africa during the 25th South African Parliament, which sat between 2009 and 2014.

Members were sworn in on 6 May 2009 during the first sitting of the National Assembly after the election on 22 April 2009. The African National Congress (DA) retained their majority, but lost their two-thirds majority. The Democratic Alliance (DA) remained the official opposition. A total of thirteen political parties held seats in the National Assembly. The term of the National Assembly expired on 6 May 2014, the day before the 2014 general election.

== Members ==
List of members of the National Assembly, as on 22 January 2014.

Name	Party	List	Notes
Salam Abram	ANC	Free State	
Patricia Emily Adams	ANC	National	
Luzelle Adams	COPE	National	
Roy Ainslie	ANC	KwaZulu-Natal	
Anton Alberts	VF+	National	Appointed on 1 September 2009 to replace Willie Spies.
Vatiswa Bam-Mugwanya	ANC	Eastern Cape	
Obed Bapela	ANC	Gauteng	
Suzan Berend	COPE	National	Appointed on 12 March 2013 to replace Nosimo Balindlela.
Francois Beukman	ANC	National	Appointed on 16 August 2013 to replace Richard Baloyi.
Nqaba Bhanga	COPE	National	Appointed on 1 December 2011 to replace Jack Tolo.
Phumzile Bhengu	ANC	KwaZulu-Natal	
Ruth Bhengu	ANC	National	
Royith Bhoola	MF	National	
Faith Bikani	ANC	Free State	
Hendrietta Bogopane-Zulu	ANC	National	
George Boinamo	DA	Gauteng	
Trevor Bonhomme	ANC	KwaZulu-Natal	Appointed on 28 October 2011 to replace Ntombikayise Sibhidla-Saphetha.
Mnyamezeli Booi	ANC	National	
Gloria Borman	ANC	KwaZulu-Natal	
Dalitha Boshigo	ANC	Limpopo	
Lourie Bosman	DA	Mpumalanga	
Tozamile Botha	COPE	National	
Yolanda Botha	ANC	National	
Grace Bothman	ANC	North West	Appointed on 2 November 2010 to replace Molefi Sefularo.
Cecil Burgess	ANC	National	
Mangosuthu Buthelezi	IFP	National	
Yunus Carrim	ANC	National	
Deidre Carter	COPE	National	
Russel Cebekhulu	IFP	KwaZulu-Natal	
Shakes Cele	ANC	KwaZulu-Natal	Appointed on 21 July 2010 to replace Senzo Mkhize.
Collins Chabane	ANC	National	
Sindisiwe Chikunga	ANC	Mpumalanga	
Dudu Chili	ANC	National	Appointed on 18 July 2012 to replace Sicelo Shiceka
Dorothy Chiloane	ANC	Mpumalanga	
Fatima Chohan	ANC	Gauteng	
Jeremy Cronin	ANC	National	
Siyabonga Cwele	ANC	National	Appointed on 6 May 2009 to replace Zola Skweyiya.
Beauty Dambuza	ANC	National	
Pamela Daniels	ANC	Gauteng	Appointed on 26 January 2011 to replace Bertha Gxowa.
Rob Davies	ANC	National	
Manuel de Freitas	DA	Gauteng	
Justus de Goede	DA	Gauteng	Appointed on 1 December 2013 to replace Ian Davidson.
Johnny de Lange	ANC	National	
Nelson Diale	ANC	Limpopo	
Buyiswa Diemu	COPE	Western Cape	
Moses Dikgacwi	ANC	Western Cape	
Koti Dikobo	AZAPO	National	Appointed on 1 May 2010 to replace Mosibudi Mangena.
Celia Ditshetelo	UCDP	North West	
Dorries Dlakude	ANC	National	Appointed on 9 February 2010 to replace Nomatyala Hangana.
Bathabile Dlamini	ANC	National	
Ayanda Dlodlo	ANC	Gauteng	
Bongekile Jabulile Dlomo	ANC	KwaZulu-Natal	Appointed on 7 September 2012 to replace Mandla Mbili.
Beauty Dlulane	ANC	National	
Anchen Dreyer	DA	Gauteng	
Sizani Dlamini-Dubazana	ANC	KwaZulu-Natal	
Molebogeng Dube	ANC	National	
Cheryllyn Dudley	ACDP	National	
Ndleleni Duma	ANC	National	
Petronella Duncan	DA	Western Cape	
Mary-Ann Dunjwa	ANC	Eastern Cape	
Deetlefs du Toit	DA	Western Cape	
Ebrahim Ebrahim	ANC	National	
Bill Eloff	DA	Western Cape	Appointed on 1 February 2012 to replace Archibold Figlan.
Shahid Esau	DA	Western Cape	Appointed on 1 February 2012 to replace Piet Pretorius.
Stuart Farrow	DA	Eastern Cape	
Beryl Ferguson	COPE	Western Cape	Appointed on 26 March 2012 to replace Phillip Dexter.
Marius Fransman	ANC	Western Cape	
Cedric Frolick	ANC	Eastern Cape	
Joan Fubbs	ANC	Gauteng	
Lennox Gaehler	UDM	Eastern Cape	
Tshoganetso Gasebonwe	ANC	Northern Cape	
André Gaum	ANC	National	Appointed on 4 November 2010 to replace Barbara Hogan.
Nonkululeko Gcume	COPE	Eastern Cape	
Ndabakayise Gcwabaza	ANC	KwaZulu-Natal	
Johan Gelderblom	ANC	Western Cape	
Dion George	DA	Gauteng	
Malusi Gigaba	ANC	National	
Nomalungelo Gina	ANC	KwaZulu-Natal	
Themba Godi	APC	National	
Christopher Gololo	ANC	Mpumalanga	
Mpumelelo Gona	ANC	Western Cape	
Monwabisi Goqwana	ANC	Eastern Cape	
Lance Greyling	ID	Western Cape	
Pieter Groenewald	VF+	National	
Donald Gumede	ANC	KwaZulu-Natal	
Fatima Hajaig	ANC	National	
Derek Hanekom	ANC	National	
Tim Harris	DA	Western Cape	Appointed on 30 June 209 to replace Ryan Coetzee.
Geordin Hill-Lewis	DA	Western Cape	Appointed on 19 August 2011 to replace Willem Doman.
Mkhuleko Hlengwa	IFP	KwaZulu-Natal	Appointed on 7 May 2012 to replace Keith Zondi.
Bantu Holomisa	UDM	National	
Patekile Holomisa	ANC	National	
Haniff Hoosen	ID	National	
Chun-Chiao Huang	COPE	National	Replaced Hilda Ndude from 19 April 2012 to 8 May 2013. (Note: Hilda Ndude ceased to be a member of the National Assembly in terms of section 47(3)(c) of the Constitution with effect from 15 April 2012 and was replaced by Chun-Chiao Huang on 19 April 2012. However, she was reinstated on 8 May 2013 in line with High Court and Supreme Court of Appeal decisions in Ndude V Congress of the People and Congress of the People of the People and Others v Ndude and Others.) Reappointed on 12 December 2013 to replace Mluleki George.
Shiaan-Bin Huang	ANC	KwaZulu-Natal	
Wilmot James	DA	Western Cape	
John Jeffery	ANC	KwaZulu-Natal	
Tina Joemat-Pettersson	ANC	Northern Cape	
Lulu Johnson	ANC	National	
Sandy Kalyan	DA	KwaZulu-Natal	
Charles Kekana	ANC	Gauteng	
Tandiwe Kenye	ANC	Eastern Cape	
Papi Kganare	COPE	Free State	
Peter Khoarai	ANC	Free State	
Eric Kholwane	ANC	Mpumalanga	
Fikile Khumalo	ANC	KwaZulu-Natal	
Nthabiseng Khunou	ANC	Free State	
Julie Kilian	COPE	Gauteng	
Junita Kloppers-Lourens	DA	Gauteng	
Dianne Kohler-Barnard	DA	KwaZulu-Natal	
Gerhard Koornhof	ANC	Gauteng	
Nic Koornhof	COPE	National	
Patricia Kopane	DA	Free State	
Zoliswa Kota-Mpeko	ANC	Western Cape	
Cecilia Kotsi	COPE	National	Appointed on 4 May 2009 to replace Mosioua Lekota.
Greg Krumbock	DA	KwaZulu-Natal	
Mmamoloko Kubayi	ANC	National	
Nqabayomzi Kwankwa	UDM	National	Appointed on 6 August 2013 to replace Ntopile Kganyago.
Helen Lamoela	DA	Western Cape	
Luwellyn Landers	ANC	KwaZulu-Natal	
Donald Lee	DA	Eastern Cape	
George Lekgetho	ANC	North West	
Mosiuoa Lekota	COPE	National	Appointed on 15 July 2010 to replace Mvume Dandala.
Regina Lesoma	ANC	National	Appointed on 7 February 2012 to replace Gwen Mahlangu-Nkabinde.
Helen Line-Hendriks	ANC	National	
Tshiwela Lishivha	ANC	National	
James Lorimer	DA	Gauteng	
Annelie Lotriet	DA	Free State	
Annette Lovemore	DA	Eastern Cape	
Zukile Luyenge	ANC	Eastern Cape	
Jerome Maake	ANC	Limpopo	
Xitlhangoma Mabasa	ANC	Gauteng	
Nomfunelo Mabedla	ANC	National	
Rejoice Mabudafhasi	ANC	National	
Catherine Mabuza	ANC	Limpopo	
Graham Mackenzie	COPE	KwaZulu-Natal	
Winnie Madikizela-Mandela	ANC	National	
Willie Madisha	COPE	Limpopo	
Maggie Madlala	ANC	Gauteng	
Celiwe Madlopha	ANC	National	Appointed on 17 November 2010 to replace Geoff Doidge.
Mapule Mafolo	ANC	North West	
Vuselelo Vincent Magagula	ANC	Mpumalanga	
Hargreaves Magama	ANC	National	
Emmanuel Magubane	ANC	KwaZulu-Natal	Appointed on 21 July 2010 to replace Trevor Bonhomme.
Gratitude Magwanishe	ANC	Gauteng	
Farida Mahomed	ANC	Gauteng	Appointed on 15 August 2013 to replace Loretta Jacobus.
Caroline Makasi	ANC	Western Cape	
Helen Makhuba	IFP	National	
Lusizo Makhubela-Mashele	ANC	National	
Zondi Makhubele	ANC	Limpopo	
Thabang Makwetla	ANC	National	
Motswane Malale	ANC	National	
Hope Malgas	ANC	Eastern Cape	
Peter Maluleka	ANC	Gauteng	
Johanna Maluleke	ANC	North West	
Buti Manamela	ANC	National	
Mduduzi Manana	ANC	Mpumalanga	
Mandla Mandela	ANC	Eastern Cape	
Modjadji Mangena	ANC	Limpopo	
Trevor Manuel	ANC	National	
Nosiviwe Mapisa-Nqakula	ANC	National	
Kobus Marais	DA	Western Cape	
Erik Marais	DA	Western Cape	
Ben Martins	ANC	National	
Paul Mashatile	ANC	Gauteng	Appointed on 2 November 2010 to replace Mondli Gungubele.
Lorraine Mashiane	COPE	National	
Refilwe Mashigo	ANC	National	
Agnes Mashishi	ANC	Limpopo	
Joyce Masilo	ANC	National	
Michael Masutha	ANC	National	
Cassel Mathale	ANC	National	Appointed on 15 July 2013 to replace Nkosazana Dlamini-Zuma.
Dudu Mathebe	ANC	Limpopo	
Nomvula Mathibela	ANC	Limpopo	
Ncumisa Matiwane	COPE	Limpopo	Appointed on 1 November 2013 to replace Kiki Rwexana.
Helen Matlanyane	ANC	National	
Joel Matshoba	ANC	Eastern Cape	
Maggie Maunye	ANC	Gauteng	
Divili Mavunda	ANC	Limpopo	
Lennit Max	DA	Western Cape	Appointed on 10 September 2010 to replace Albert Fritz.
Shepherd Mayatula	ANC	National	Appointed on 7 February 2012 to replace Enoch Godongwana.
David Maynier	DA	Western Cape	
Lindiwe Mazibuko	DA	KwaZulu-Natal	
Alpheus Maziya	ANC	National	Appointed on 27 November 2009 to replace Pallo Jordan.
Fikile Mbalula	ANC	National	
Pakiso Mbhele	COPE	Gauteng	Appointed on 4 May 2009 to replace Siphiwe Thusi.
Joe McGluwa	ID	National	Appointed on 28 April 2009 to replace Andrew Seirlis.
Graham McIntosh	COPE	National	Appointed on 26 May 2011 to replace Anele Mda.
Nomakhaya Mdaka	ANC	Eastern Cape	
Richard Mdakane	ANC	Gauteng	
Vytjie Mentor	ANC	National	
Kenneth Meshoe	ACDP	National	Resigned on 21 June 2013 and replaced by Wayne Thring. Appointed on 21 November 2013 to replace Wayne Thring.
Nomaindia Mfeketo	ANC	National	
Alina Mfulo	ANC	National	Appointed on 15 June 2012 to replace Roy Padayachie.
Isaac Mfundisi	ACDP	National	Appointed on 25 January 2012 to replace Mavis Matladi.
Hlengiwe Mgabadeli	ANC	KwaZulu-Natal	
Natasha Michael	DA	Gauteng	
Kevin Mileham	DA	Eastern Cape	Appointed on 1 June 2013 to replace Athol Trollip.
Lindiwe Mjobo	ANC	KwaZulu-Natal	
Hlengiwe Mkhize	ANC	National	
Nomfundo Mkhulusi	ANC	KwaZulu-Natal	
Emmanuel Mlambo	ANC	Gauteng	
Andrew Mlangeni	ANC	Gauteng	
Samuel Mmusi	ANC	North West	
Albert Mncwango	IFP	National	
Paul Mnguni	COPE	North West	
Nokhaya Mnisi	ANC	Mpumalanga	
Masizole Mnqasela	DA	Western Cape	
Poppy Mocumi	ANC	Gauteng	
John Moepeng	ANC	North West	Appointed on 6 February 2012 to replace Kabelo Mataboge.
Seiso Mohai	ANC	Free State	Appointed on 26 March 2013 to replace Kgomotso Magau.
Mankwana Mohale	ANC	National	
Mpane Mohorosi	ANC	Free State	Appointed on 19 October 2011 to replace Butana Komphela.
Stevens Mokgalapa	DA	Gauteng	
Aubrey Mokoena	ANC	Gauteng	Appointed on 26 November 2009 to replace Frans Masango.
Angie Molebatsi	ANC	National	
Edna Molewa	ANC	National	
Joyce Moloi-Moropa	ANC	National	
Koena Moloto	ANC	National	Appointed on 9 November 2010 to replace Alina Rantsolase.
Emma More	DA	Gauteng	
Masefele Morutoa	ANC	Gauteng	
Constance Mosimane	COPE	Gauteng	Appointed on 26 March 2012 to replace Nolitha Vakuza-Linda.
Linda Moss	ANC	Western Cape	
Sej Motau	DA	Gauteng	
Malusi Motimele	ANC	Limpopo	
Kgalema Motlanthe	ANC	National	
Rebecca Motsepe	ANC	National	Appointed on 26 January 2011 to replace Membathisi Mdladlana.
Angie Motshekga	ANC	National	
Mathole Motshekga	ANC	National	
Aaron Motsoaledi	ANC	National	
Alton Mphethi	PAC	National	Appointed on 15 July 2013 to replace Letlapa Mphahlele.
Alfred Mpontshane	IFP	KwaZulu-Natal	
Christian Msimang	IFP	National	
Hildah Msweli	IFP	KwaZulu-Natal	
Nathi Mthethwa	ANC	National	
Enock Mthethwa	ANC	KwaZulu-Natal	
Eric Mtshali	ANC	National	
Kenneth Mubu	DA	Gauteng	
Thaba Mufamadi	ANC	National	
Corné Mulder	VF+	National	
Pieter Mulder	VF+	National	
Foni Mushwana	ANC	National	
Faith Muthambi	ANC	Limpopo	
Elleck Nchabeleng	ANC	Limpopo	
Gabriel Ndabandaba	ANC	KwaZulu-Natal	
Stella Ndabeni-Abrahams	ANC	Eastern Cape	
S'bu Ndebele	ANC	National	
Zintle Ndlazi	ANC	National	Appointed on 18 October 2010 to replace Mighty Madasa.
Velaphi Ndlovu	IFP	KwaZulu-Natal	
Hilda Ndude	COPE	National	Ceased to be a member of the National Assembly on 15 April 2012 but reinstated on 8 May 2013.
Andries Nel	ANC	National	
Wendy Nelson	ANC	North West	
Nhlanhla Nene	ANC	National	
Wilma Newhoudt-Druchen	ANC	National	
Doris Ngcengwane	ANC	National	Appointed on 29 July 2009 to replace Lindiwe Zulu.
Beatrice Ngcobo	ANC	KwaZulu-Natal	
Eugene Ngcobo	ANC	National	
Nombuyiselo Ngele	ANC	National	
Smuts Ngonyama	COPE	National	
Jabhile Ngubeni-Maluleka	ANC	Mpumalanga	Appointed on 13 June 2012 to replace Florence Nyanda.
Winnie Ngwenya	ANC	Gauteng	
Phumuzile Ngwenya-Mabila	ANC	National	
Mlindi Nhanha	COPE	Eastern Cape	
Dumisile Nhlengethwa	ANC	Mpumalanga	
Sisa Njikelana	ANC	National	
Makho Njobe	COPE	Eastern Cape	
Maite Nkoana-Mashabane	ANC	National	
Sibongile Nkomo	IFP	KwaZulu-Natal	Appointed on 21 May 2013 to replace Eric Lucas.
Gugile Nkwinti	ANC	Eastern Cape	
Mwelo Nonkonyana	ANC	National	
Nomathemba November	ANC	National	
Stanley Ntapane	UDM	National	
Phumelele Ntshiqela	COPE	Gauteng	
Bongi Ntuli	ANC	National	
Zwelifile Christopher Ntuli	ANC	KwaZulu-Natal	
Tinyiko Nwamitwa-Shilubana	ANC	Limpopo	Appointed on 8 October 2010 to replace Tshenuwani Farisani.
Thulas Nxesi	ANC	National	
Muntu Doreen Nxumalo	ANC	Gauteng	
Raesibe Nyalungu	ANC	Mpumalanga	Appointed on 29 April 2009 to replace Buoang Mashile.
Siphiwe Nyanda	ANC	National	
Eric Nyekemba	ANC	Gauteng	
Blade Nzimande	ANC	National	
Godfrey Oliphant	ANC	National	Appointed on 5 August 2009 to replace Ngconde Balfour.
Mildred Oliphant	ANC	National	
Ian Ollis	DA	Gauteng	
Gert Oosthuizen	ANC	National	
Mario Oriani-Ambrosini	IFP	National	
Naledi Pandor	ANC	National	
Sarah Paulse	ID	National	Appointed on 10 September 2010 to replace Patricia de Lille.
Dipuo Peters	ANC	National	
Joe Phaahla	ANC	National	
Meriam Phaliso	ANC	National	
Chana Pilane-Majake	ANC	Gauteng	Appointed on 16 January 2012 to replace Ntsiki Magazi.
Maropeng Pilusa-Mosoane	ANC	Limpopo	
Sanna Plaatjie	COPE	Northern Cape	
Dina Pule	ANC	National	
Pierre Rabie	DA	Western Cape	
Winston Rabotapi	DA	North West	
Bheki Radebe	ANC	Free State	
Goodwill Radebe	ANC	Mpumalanga	
Leonard Ramatlakane	COPE	National	Appointed on 15 July 2009 to replace Lynda Odendaal.
Ngoako Ramatlhodi	ANC	National	
Dorothy Ramodibe	ANC	National	
Denise Robinson	DA	Western Cape	
Francois Rodgers	DA	KwaZulu-Natal	Appointed on 14 March 2013 to replace Gareth Morgan.
David Ross	DA	Free State	Appointed on 1 December 2009 to replace Cobus Schmidt.
Gertroedh Saal	ANC	National	
Rafeek Shah	DA	KwaZulu-Natal	Appointed on 1 February 2012 to replace Mike Ellis.
Debbie Schäfer	DA	Western Cape	
Hendrik Schmidt	DA	Gauteng	
Greg Schneemann	ANC	Gauteng	
Morwesi Segale-Diswai	ANC	North West	
Priscilla Sekgobela	ANC	National	Appointed on 20 January 2014 to replace Crosby Moni.
Gaolaolwe Selau	ANC	North West	
James Selfe	DA	Western Cape	
Connie September	ANC	Western Cape	
Tokyo Sexwale	ANC	National	
Susan Shabangu	ANC	National	
Marian Shinn	DA	Western Cape	
Jonas Sibanyoni	ANC	Gauteng	Appointed on 23 June 2009 to replace Oupa Monareng.
Dudu Sibiya	ANC	KwaZulu-Natal	Appointed on 20 September 2011 to replace Albertina Luthuli.
Gelana Sindane	ANC	National	Appointed on 7 February 2012 to replace Bulelwa Sonjica.
Narend Singh	IFP	KwaZulu-Natal	
Lindiwe Sisulu	ANC	National	
Max Sisulu	ANC	National	
Petros Sithole	IFP	Gauteng	Appointed on 4 May 2010 to replace Bonginkosi Dhlamini.
Sheila Sithole	ANC	National	
Stone Sizani	ANC	Eastern Cape	
James Skosana	ANC	Mpumalanga	
Ben Skosana	IFP	National	
Jacques Smalle	DA	Limpopo	Appointed on 10 September 2010 to replace Désirée van der Walt.
Donald Smiles	DA	Eastern Cape	
Peter Smith	IFP	KwaZulu-Natal	
Vincent Smith	ANC	National	Appointed on 29 April 2009 to replace Dennis Bloem.
Dene Smuts	DA	Western Cape	
Grant Snell	ANC	Eastern Cape	
Elliot Sogoni	ANC	Gauteng	
Rose Sonto	ANC	National	Appointed on 3 February 2010 to replace Siva Pillay.
Jabu Sosibo	ANC	KwaZulu-Natal	
Maggie Sotyu	ANC	Free State	
John Steenhuisen	DA	KwaZulu-Natal	Appointed on 19 July 2011 to replace Mark Steele.
Annette Steyn	DA	Eastern Cape	
Butch Steyn	DA	Gauteng	
Dirk Stubbe	DA	Northern Cape	Appointed on 10 September 2010 to replace Andrew Louw.
Litho Suka	ANC	Eastern Cape	
Ebrahim Sulliman	ANC	Northern Cape	
Thandile Sunduza	ANC	National	Appointed on 11 June 2009 to replace Charles Nqakula.
Enver Surty	ANC	National	
Daryl Swanepoel	ANC	National	Appointed on 16 October 2013 to replace Sue van der Merwe.
Marius Swart	DA	Western Cape	
Steve Swart	ACDP	National	
Mpowele Swathe	DA	Limpopo	
Juanita Terblanche	DA	North West	
Elizabeth Thabethe	ANC	Gauteng	
Jerry Thibedi	ANC	National	Appointed on 19 August 2010 to replace Manto Tshabalala-Msimang.
Setlamorago Thobejane	ANC	National	
Barbara Thomson	ANC	KwaZulu-Natal	
Bulelwa Tinto	ANC	National	
Manana Tlake	ANC	Free State	
Thandi Tobias	ANC	National	
Sussana Tsebe	ANC	North West	
Grace Tseke	ANC	Mpumalanga	
Lechesa Tsenoli	ANC	National	
Judith Tshabalala	ANC	National	Appointed on 19 October 2011 to replace Noluthando Mayende-Sibiya.
Pam Tshwete	ANC	Eastern Cape	
Dikeledi Tsotetsi	ANC	Gauteng	
Ben Turok	ANC	National	
Ntombikayise Twala	ANC	Eastern Cape	
Pieter van Dalen	DA	Western Cape	
Niekie van den Berg	DA	Gauteng	
Japie van der Linde	DA	Western Cape	
Koos van der Merwe	IFP	National	
Liezl van der Merwe	IFP	National	Appointed on 7 May 2012 to replace Pat Lebenya-Ntanzi.
Andricus van der Westhuizen	DA	Western Cape	
Manie van Dyk	DA	Gauteng	
Des van Rooyen	ANC	National	Appointed on 27 July 2009 to replace Baleka Mbete.
Ena van Schalkwyk	DA	Northern Cape	
Marthinus van Schalkwyk	ANC	National	
Annelize van Wyk	ANC	National	Appointed on 5 August 2009 to replace Lindiwe Hendricks.
Michael Waters	DA	Gauteng	
Watty Watson	DA	Mpumalanga	Appointed on 8 November 2011 to replace James Masango.
Zanoxolo Wayile	ANC	Eastern Cape	Appointed on 26 March 2013 to replace Benson Fihla.
Marta Wenger	DA	Gauteng	
Adrian Williams	ANC	Mpumalanga	
Sophia Williams-De Bruyn	ANC	Gauteng	Appointed on 9 November 2010 to replace Ismail Vadi.
Pretty Xaba	ANC	Gauteng	
Tokozile Xasa	ANC	Eastern Cape	
Dumisani Ximbi	ANC	National	Appointed on 19 October 2011 to replace Tovhowani Tshivhase.
Lulu Xingwana	ANC	National	
Lumka Yengeni	ANC	National	
Constance Zikalala	IFP	National	
Zeblon Zulu	ANC	KwaZulu-Natal	

== Vacancies and replacements ==
A seat in the National Assembly becomes vacant when the member dies, resigns, ceases to be eligible, or is elected as President of South Africa. In addition, section 47(3)(c) of the Constitution prescribes that a person loses his membership if he ceases to be a member of the party that nominated him as a member. Any vacancy is filled from the same party list as the former member.

Party	List	Seat vacated by	Date of vacancy	Reason for vacancy	Replaced by	Date of replacement
COPE	National	Mosioua Lekota	22 April 2009	Elected but not available	Cecilia Kotsi	4 May 2009
ID	National	Andrew Seirlis	28 April 2009	Resigned	Joe McGluwa	29 April 2009
UCDP	National	Kgomotso Ditshetelo	28 April 2009	Resigned	Mavis Matladi	29 April 2009
ANC	Mpumalanga	Buoang Mashile	22 April 2009	Elected but not available	Raesibe Nyalungu	29 April 2009
ANC	National	Zola Skweyiya	5 May 2009	Resigned	Siyabonga Cwele	6 May 2009
ANC	National	Nozizwe Madlala-Routledge	5 May 2009	Resigned	Patricia Emily Adams	5 May 2009
ANC	National	Tirhani Mathebula	5 May 2009	Resigned	Eugene Ngcobo	5 May 2009
ANC	National	Jacob Zuma	6 May 2009	Elected President of South Africa	Tshiwela Lishivha	12 May 2009
ANC	Mpumalanga	Nomvula Shoba	6 May 2009	Died	Thapelo Chiloane	21 May 2009
ANC	National	Baleka Mbete	6 May 2009	Elected but not available	Des van Rooyen	27 July 2009
ANC	National	Charles Nqakula	1 June 2009	Resigned	Thandile Sunduza	11 June 2009
ANC	National	Mandisi Mpahlwa	1 June 2009	Resigned	Mighty Madasa	13 June 2009
ANC	Gauteng	Oupa Monareng	8 June 2009	Resigned	Jonas Sibanyoni	22 June 2009
DA	Western Cape	Ryan Coetzee	30 June 2009	Resigned	Tim Harris	10 September 2010
ANC	National	Lindiwe Zulu	6 July 2009	Resigned	Doris Ngcengwane	29 July 2009
COPE	National	Lynda Odendaal	7 July 2009	Resigned	Leonard Ramatlakane	15 July 2009
ANC	National	Ngconde Balfour	1 August 2009	Resigned	Godfrey Oliphant	29 JAugust 2009
ANC	National	Lindiwe Hendricks	5 August 2009	Resigned	Annelize van Wyk	5 August 2009
ANC	Gauteng	Willie Spies	1 September 2009	Resigned	Anton Alberts	1 September 2009
ANC	Gauteng	Frans Masango	18 September 2009	Died	Aubrey Mokoena	26 November 2009
ANC	National	Pallo Jordan	21 October 2009	Resigned	Alpheus Maziya	26 November 2009
DA	Free State	Cobus Schmidt	23 November 2009	Died	David Ross	1 December 2009
ANC	National	Manto Tshabalala-Msimang	26 December 2009	Died	Jerry Thibedi	19 August 2010
ANC	National	Siva Pillay	1 February 2010	Resigned	Rose Sonto	3 February 2010
ANC	National	Nomatyala Hangana	1 February 2010	Resigned	Dorries Dlakude	9 February 2010
ANC	North West	Molefi Sefularo	5 April 2010	Died	Grace Bothman	2 November 2010
AZAPO	National	Mosibudi Mangena	1 May 2010	Resigned	Koti Dikobo	1 May 2010
IFP	Gauteng	Bonginkosi Dhlamini	4 May 2010	Resigned	Petros Sithole	4 May 2010
ANC	Limpopo	Mamagana Nyama	16 May 2010	Resigned	Frans Maserumule	29 July 2010
ANC	LKwaZulu-Natal	Senzo Mkhize	16 May 2010	Resigned	Mosie Cele	21 May 2010
ANC	KwaZulu-Natal	Trevor Bonhomme	19 May 2010	Resigned	Emmanuel Magubane	21 July 2010
ANC	Western Cape	Ebrahim Rasool	31 May 2010	Resigned	Connie September	9 September 2010
COPE	National	Mvume Dandala	15 July 2010	Resigned	Mosioua Lekota	15 July 2010
ANC	National	Mighty Madasa	1 September 2010	Resigned	Zintle Ndlazi	18 October 2010
DA	Western Cape	Albert Fritz	10 September 2010	Resigned	Lennit Max	10 September 2010
DA	Northern Cape	Andrew Louw	10 September 2010	Resigned	Dirk Stubbe	10 September 2010
DA	Limpopo	Désirée van der Walt	10 September 2010	Resigned	Jacques Smalle	10 September 2010
ID	National	Patricia de Lille	10 September 2010	Resigned	Sarah Paulse	10 September 2010
ANC	Limpopo	Tshenuwani Farisani	30 September 2010	Resigned	Tinyiko Nwamitwa-Shilubana	8 October 2010
ANC	National	Barbara Hogan	1 November 2010	Resigned	André Gaum	4 November 2010
ANC	National	Buyelwa Sonjica	1 November 2010	Resigned	Gelana Sindane	7 November 2010
ANC	National	Geoff Doidge	1 November 2010	Resigned	Celiwe Madlopha	17 November 2010
ANC	National	Makhenkesi Stofile	1 November 2010	Resigned	Crosby Moni	17 November 2010
ANC	Gauteng	Mondli Gungubele	1 November 2010	Resigned	Paul Mashatile	2 November 2010
ANC	National	Alina Rantsolase	3 November 2010	Died	Koena Moloto	9 November 2010
ANC	Gauteng	Ismail Vadi	9 November 2010	Resigned	Sophia Williams-De Bruyn	9 November 2010
ANC	National	Membathisi Mdladlana	1 November 2010	Resigned	Rebecca Motsepe	26 January 2011
ANC	Gauteng	Bertha Gxowa	19 November 2010	Died	Pamela Daniels	26 January 2011
ANC	National	Hlomane Chauke	17 November 2010	Resigned	Fezile Bhengu	19 October 2011
ANC	National	Tovhowani Tshivhase	1 January 2011	Resigned	Dumisani Ximbi	19 October 2011
COPE	National	Mbhazima Shilowa	9 February 2011	No longer a party member	–	Vacant until the end of term
ANC	National	Noluthando Mayende-Sibiya	9 February 2011	Resigned	Judith Tshabalala	19 October 2011
DA	Western Cape	Willem Doman	12 April 2011	Resigned	Geordin Hill-Lewis	19 August 2011
ANC	KwaZulu-Natal	Albertina Luthuli	1 May 2011	Resigned	Duduzile Sibiya	20 September 2011
COPE	National	Anele Mda	11 May 2011	Resigned	Graham McIntosh	26 May 2011
ANC	Free State	Butana Komphela	14 June 2011	Resigned	Mpane Mohorosi	19 October 2011
COPE	Gauteng	Nolitha Vukuza-Linda	1 July 2011	Resigned	Constance Mosimane	26 March 2012
DA	KwaZulu-Natal	Mark Steele	19 July 2011	Resigned	John Steenhuisen	19 July 2011
ANC	North West	Kabelo Mataboge	1 July 2011	Resigned	John Moepeng	6 February 2012
COPE	National	Jack Tolo	22 August 2011	Died	Nqaba Bhanga	1 December 2011
DA	KwaZulu-Natal	Mike Ellis	24 September 2011	Resigned	Rafeek Shah	1 February 2012
ANC	National	Gwen Mahlangu-Nkabinde	24 October 2011	Resigned	Regina Lesoma	7 February 2012
ANC	KwaZulu-Natal	Ntombikayise Sibhidla-Saphetha	28 October 2011	Resigned	Trevor Bonhomme	28 October 2011
DA	Mpumalanga	James Masango	8 November 2011	Resigned	Watty Watson	8 November 2012
ANC	Gauteng	Mavis Magazi	11 November 2011	Died	Chana Pilane-Majake	18 January 2012
UCDP	National	Mavis Matladi	2 December 2011	Died	Isaac Mfundisi	25 January 2012
ANC	National	Enoch Godongwana	31 December 2011	Resigned	Shepherd Mayathula	7 February 2012
COPE	Western Cape	Phillip Dexter	4 January 2012	Resigned	Beryl Ferguson	26 March 2012
DA	Western Cape	Piet Pretorius	1 February 2012	Resigned	Shahid Esau	1 February 2012
DA	Western Cape	Archie Figlan	1 February 2012	Resigned	Bill Eloff	1 February 2012
IFP	KwaZulu-Natal	Keith Zondi	1 February 2012	Resigned	Mkhuleko Hlengwa	1 February 2012
COPE	National	Hilda Ndude	15 April 2012	No longer a party member	Chun-Chiao Huang	19 April 2012
ANC	National	Sicelo Shiceka	30 April 2012	Died	Dudu Chili	18 July 2012
IFP	KwaZulu-Natal	Pat Lebenya-Ntanzi	1 May 2012	Resigned	Liezl van der Merwe	1 February 2012
ANC	Mpumalanga	Florence Nyanda	5 May 2012	Died	Jabhile Ngubeni-Maluleka	13 June 2012
ANC	National	Roy Padayachie	5 May 2012	Died	Alina Mfulo	15 June 2012
ANC	KwaZulu-Natal	Mandla Mbili	10 July 2012	Died	Bongekile Dlomo	7 September 2012
ANC	National	Nkosazana Dlamini-Zuma	1 October 2012	Resigned	Cassel Mathale	15 July 2013
ANC	Limpopo	Piet Mathebe	1 October 2012	Resigned	–	Vacant until the end of term.
COPE	National	Nosimo Balindlela	13 November 2012	Resigned	Suzan Berend	12 March 2013
IFP	KwaZulu-Natal	Eric Lucas	15 January 2013	Resigned	Sibongile Nkomo	21 May 2013
ANC	Free State	Kgomotso Magau	1 February 2013	Resigned	Seiso Mohai	26 March 2013
DA	KwaZulu-Natal	Gareth Morgan	4 February 2013	Resigned	Francois Rodgers	14 March 2013
ANC	Eastern Cape	Benson Fihla	22 March 2013	Resigned	Zanuxolo Wayile	26 March 2013
COPE	National	Chun-Chiao Huang	8 May 2013	Appointment reversed by court order	Hilda Ndude	8 May 2013
DA	Eastern Cape	Athol Trollip	1 June 2013	Resigned	Kevin Mileham	1 June 2013
ACDP	National	Kenneth Meshoe	21 June 2013	Resigned	Wayne Thring	21 June 2013
ANC	National	Richard Baloyi	10 July 2013	Resigned	Francois Beukman	16 August 2013
PAC	National	Letlapa Mphahlele	10 July 2013	No longer a party member	Seropane Mphethi	15 July 2013
UDM	National	Ntopile Kganyago	17 July 2013	Died	Nqabayomzi Kwankwa	6 August 2013
ANC	Gauteng	Loretta Jacobus	1 August 2013	Resigned	Farida Mahomed	15 August 2013
ANC	National	Sue van der Merwe	16 October 2013	Resigned	Daryl Swanepoel	16 October 2013
COPE	National	Kiki Rwexana	1 November 2013	Resigned	Ncumisa Matiwane	1 November 2013
ACDP	National	Wayne Thring	21 November 2013	Resigned	Kenneth Meshoe	21 November 2013
DA	Gauteng	Ian Davidson	1 December 2013	Resigned	Justus de Goede	1 December 2013
COPE	National	Mluleki George	15 November 2013	No longer a party member	Chun-Chiao Huang	12 December 2013
ANC	National	Crosby Moni	22 November 2013	Died	Priscilla Sekgobela	20 January 2014
