= Selau (disambiguation) =

Selau is a district in Autonomous Region of Bougainville of Papua New Guinea.

Selau may also refer to:

- Selau language, a dialect of Halia
- Jelly Selau (born 1983), Tuvaluan footballer
- Selau (singer), singer featured on Messy Marv 2006 album What You Know bout Me?
- Gaolaolwe Joseph Selau, member of the 25th Parliament of South Africa
