= Eric Lucas (politician) =

South African politician (born 1937)

Member of the National Assembly
- In office 9 May 1994 – 15 January 2013

Personal details
- Born: 21 January 1937 (age 89)
- Citizenship: South Africa
- Party: Inkatha Freedom Party

Eric James Lucas (born 21 January 1937) is a retired South African politician who represented the Inkatha Freedom Party (ANC) in the National Assembly from 1994 to 2013. He resigned from his seat in January 2013.

== Parliamentary career: 1994–2013 ==
Lucas was born on 21 January 1937. He was elected to the National Assembly in the 1994 general election, South Africa's first under universal suffrage. He served for close to four consecutive terms, gaining re-election in 1999, 2004, and 2009; he represented the KwaZulu-Natal constituency. He resigned from his seat on 15 January 2013 and was replaced by Sibongile Nkomo.

In September 2013, the Mail & Guardian published investigative reporting which purported to uncover possible misconduct by Lucas during his term in Parliament, in particular in connection with a Gold Fields mining deal concluded in 2010, when Lucas was a member of the Portfolio Committee on Mineral Resources. AmaBhungane said it had seen a leaked copy of a 2010 memo by the personal assistant of Gayton McKenzie, who had acted as a consultant on the deal. In the memo, McKenzie advised that Lucas should be awarded shares because he had "played a pivotal role in lobbying for the South Deep license" (a mining license required by Gold Field for deal to go through). Further investigation by American law firm Paul, Weiss found that Lucas had "nominate[d] Nicole Lucas [his daughter] to represent his interests", since it would be inappropriate for him to receive the shares personally; Paul, Weiss concluded that Gold Fields had used a front company to conceal the award of shares to Lucas (and to his colleague Musa Zondi), possibly as a form of influence-peddling and possibly in breach of anti-corruption laws. Lucas did not respond to the allegations.
