= Dubazana =

Dubazana is a surname. Notable people with the surname include:

- Jabulani Dubazana (born 1954), South African singer
- Sizani Dlamini-Dubazana (fl. from 1982), South African politician
