= Mighty Madasa =

South African politician (born 1960)

Member of the National Assembly
- In office 13 June 2009 – 1 September 2010
- In office June 1999 – May 2009
- Constituency: Gauteng

Personal details
- Born: Zwelethu Lukanyiso Madasa; 20 February 1960 (age 66)
- Citizenship: South Africa
- Party: African National Congress (since September 2005)
- Other political affiliations: African Christian Democratic Party (until September 2005)

Zwelethu Lukanyiso "Mighty" Madasa (born 20 February 1960) is a South African politician and lawyer who served in the National Assembly from 1999 to 2010, excepting a month-long hiatus in 2009. He represented the African Christian Democratic Party (ACDP) until September 2005, when he crossed the floor to the African National Congress (ANC). He resigned from the National Assembly in September 2010 and became the Clerk of the Pan-African Parliament.

== Early life ==
Madasa was born on 20 February 1960.

== South African Parliament ==
Madasa was first elected to the National Assembly in the 1999 general election as a representative of the ACDP in Gauteng and was elected to a second term in his seat in the 2004 general election. Shortly after the 2004 election, the National Assembly nominated him as one of its five representatives at the Pan-African Parliament.

He resigned from the ACDP and joined the governing ANC on 8 September 2005 during that month's floor-crossing window. The ACDP said that he and his fellow defector, Selby Khumalo, were "respected and valued members of the ACDP" but that their decision did not "reflect the will of the voters". Madasa served the rest of the legislative term under the ANC banner, and in October 2008, in a reshuffle of the ANC's caucus, the party nominated him to chair the Portfolio Committee on International Relations.

However, he held the chairmanship for less than a year, because he was not re-elected to his legislative seat in the 2009 general election. He was restored to his seat just over a month after the election, on 13 June 2009; he was sworn in to fill the casual vacancy in the ANC's caucus that had arisen after Mandisi Mpahlwa's resignation.

== Pan-African Parliament ==
On 1 September 2010, Madasa in turn resigned from the National Assembly and took up a full-time position as head of the Secretariat of the Pan-African Parliament.

He is a lawyer by profession and in June 2016 was one of 73 candidates nominated to succeed Thuli Madonsela as Public Protector, though he was not shortlisted.
