= Cheryl Gillwald =

South African politician (1956–2010)

Member of the National Assembly of South Africa
- In office 1997 – 31 January 2006

Member of the Senate of South Africa
- In office 1994–1997

Personal details
- Born: Cheryl Ellen Gillwald; 13 December 1956 Welkom, Orange Free State Province, Union of South Africa
- Died: 27 July 2010 (aged 53)
- Party: African National Congress
- Spouse: Charles Cousins
- Children: 1
- Education: Roedean School for Girls
- Alma mater: University of the Free State (BCom)
- Profession: Politician

Cheryl Ellen Gillwald (13 December 1956 – 27 July 2010) was a South African politician. A member of the African National Congress, she was elected as a member of the Senate of South Africa in 1994. In 1997 she became a member of the South African National Assembly where she served until her resignation from public office in 2006. Gillwald was appointed Deputy Minister of Justice in 1999 before becoming Deputy Minister of Correctional Services in 2004.

== Early life and education ==
Gillwald was born on 13 December 1956 in Welkom in what was then the Orange Free State Province of the Union of South Africa. She attended Roedean School for Girls in Johannesburg, matriculating in 1974. After a year as an American Field Service exchange student at Washington High School in Wisconsin, Gillwald started studying at the University of the Free State, from which she graduated with a Bachelor of Commerce in 1979.

== Career ==
Gillwald was involved in community work in the Intabazwe township outside Harrismith where she also helped found the Fundisanani Community Trust, built a centre for street children, and organised winter schools to assist matric students in the township with their mathematics and science. She also worked for multiple companies as a public relations officer as well as director of finance and administration.

== Political career ==
Gillwald joined the African National Congress after the party was unbanned by the white minority government in 1990. Following the first post-apartheid elections in 1994, Gillwald was appointed by the Free State ANC to serve in the newly reestablished Senate which later became the National Council of Provinces. She was appointed to the National Assembly in the same year. While a backbencher, she sat on the Standing Committee on Public Accounts and the Portfolio Committee on Finance.

After Gillwald was elected to a full term in the National Assembly in 1999, President Thabo Mbeki appointed her Deputy Minister of Justice and Constitutional Development. She became Deputy Minister of Correctional Services in late-April 2004 following that year's general election. In her new position, Gillwald spoke out against the overcrowding of South African prisons in June 2004, calling it entirely unstainable and unacceptable.

Mbeki informed the first cabinet meeting of 2006 held on 25 January that he had granted Gillwald's request to vacate her position in government to attend to family commitments at the end of the month. She resigned from the government and tendered her resignation as a Member of Parliament on 31 January 2006. Loretta Jacobus was appointed to succeed Gillwald.

== Death ==
Gillwald was married to Charles Cousins. She had one son, Dane.

Gillwald died from cancer on 27 July 2010, at the age of 53.
