= Arthur Moloto =

South African politician and businessman (born 1968)

Member of the National Assembly
- In office 9 November 2010 – 6 May 2014
- In office June 1999 – May 2009
- Constituency: Limpopo

Personal details
- Born: Koena Arthur Moloto; 2 July 1968 (age 57)
- Citizenship: South Africa
- Party: African National Congress

Koena Arthur Moloto (born 2 July 1968) is a South African politician and businessman who represented the African National Congress (ANC) in the National Assembly from 1999 to 2009 and from 2010 to 2014. He also chaired the Government Employees Pension Fund from 2009 to 2014.

== Life and career ==
Moloto was born on 2 July 1968. He served two consecutive terms in the National Assembly, gaining election in 1999 and 2004. He was a member of the ANC's Limpopo caucus and served as acting chairperson of the Portfolio Committee on Finance in 2008 after the incumbent chair, Nhlanhla Nene, was appointed Deputy Minister of Finance.

Moloto stood for re-election in the 2009 general election but was ranked too low on the ANC's party list to win a seat. Instead, in September 2009, he was appointed as chairperson of the multibillion-rand Government Employees Pension Fund (GEPF). He served a single term in that position, leaving in 2014; during that time, he clashed publicly with the fund's principal executive officer, John Oliphant, whom the board suspended on disciplinary charges.

At the same time, Moloto returned to the National Assembly on 9 November 2010, when he was sworn in to fill the casual vacancy arising from Alina Rantsolase's death. Dion George, the finance spokesperson for the opposition Democratic Alliance, questioned whether it was appropriate for Moloto to serve simultaneously as GEPF chair and as an elected politician. He left the National Assembly after the 2014 general election and soon afterwards was appointed as political and economic adviser to the Speaker of the National Assembly, Baleka Mbete.
