= Beryl Ferguson =

South African politician

Beryl Delores Ferguson is a South African politician from the COPE. In 2012 she was appointed to replace Phillip Dexter in the National Assembly of South Africa.

In 2021, she was shortlisted to chair the National Lotteries Commission.

== See also ==
- List of National Assembly members of the 25th Parliament of South Africa
