= Xitlhangoma Mabasa =

South African politician

Member of the National Assembly
- In office 14 November 2008 – 7 May 2019

Member of the Gauteng Executive Council for Social Development
- In office 29 April 2004 – 26 January 2006
- Premier: Mbhazima Shilowa
- Preceded by: Angie Motshekga (for Social Services and Population Development)
- Succeeded by: Kgaogelo Lekgoro

Member of the Gauteng Provincial Legislature
- In office May 1994 – January 2006

Personal details
- Born: 2 February 1951 (age 75)
- Citizenship: South Africa
- Party: African National Congress
- Other political affiliations: South African Communist Party

Xitlhangoma Mabasa (born 2 February 1951), also known as Bob Mabaso, is a South African politician and former trade unionist from Gauteng. He represented the African National Congress (ANC) in the National Assembly from 2008 to 2019, serving the Gauteng constituency from 2009 onwards.

Before entering the National Assembly, Mabasa served in the Gauteng Provincial Legislature from 1994 to 2006, latterly as Gauteng's Member of the Executive Council for Social Development from 2004 to 2006. He is also a former leader of the South African Communist Party (SACP) in Gauteng.

== Early life and career ==
Mabasa was born on 2 February 1951. He rose to prominence through the Post and Telecommunication Workers' Association, where he was deputy president and later education chairperson.

== Gauteng Provincial Legislature: 1994–2006 ==
Mabaso was first elected to the Gauteng Provincial Legislature in 1994 and he was the Chief Whip of the Majority Party, the ANC, in the legislature from 1994 to 2001. After his re-election to the provincial legislature in the 2004 general election, he was appointed to the Gauteng Executive Council by Mbhazima Shilowa, who was then the Premier of Gauteng.

=== Sexual harassment scandal ===
On 27 January 2006, Shilowa announced that he had accepted Mabaso's resignation, tendered the day before. Shilowa said that he had received "a complaint relating to allegations of sexual harassment" against Mabaso. Mabaso denied having committed any act of sexual harassment but had resigned due to the seriousness the government attached to the allegations.

The opposition Democratic Alliance welcomed Mabaso's resignation, saying "we suspect these allegations have given Shilowa a convenient way of getting rid of Mabaso without having to admit to the massive failure of delivery by [Mabaso's] department". Health MEC Gwen Ramokgopa was appointed to take over his portfolio in an acting capacity, and a permanent replacement, Kgaogelo Lekgoro, was announced on 23 March. Mabaso also stepped down as a Member of the Provincial Legislature. In addition, he was the incumbent Provincial Chairperson of the SACP in Gauteng, having been re-elected to that position in July 2004; although the SACP initially said he would retain the position, he also resigned as Provincial Chairperson.

The details of the sexual harassment complaint were not initially released, but Mabaso later said that the complainant was Nonqaba Mosunkutu, the wife of his former colleague in the Executive Council, Khabisi Mosunkutu, and a family friend; he said she had accused him of attempting to rape her in November 2005. In October 2006, the National Prosecuting Authority declined to prosecute Mabaso; by January 2007, he had also been cleared in an internal ANC process.

== National Assembly: 2008–2019 ==
On 14 November 2008, Mabasa was sworn in to the National Assembly to replace Kiki Rwexana, who had defected to the opposition Congress of the People. He was elected to full terms in the assembly in 2009 and 2014, representing the Gauteng constituency. During the 26th Parliament from 2014 to 2019, he was the ANC's whip in the Portfolio Committee on Small Business Development.

== Personal life ==
As of 2006, Mabaso was married to Elizabeth, with whom he had four children.
