= Farida Mahomed =

South African politician

Member of the National Assembly
- In office 15 August 2013 – May 2014
- Constituency: Gauteng
- In office May 1996 – May 2009

Personal details
- Born: 2 February 1955 (age 71)
- Citizenship: South Africa
- Party: African National Congress

Farida Mahomed (born 2 February 1955) is a South African politician who represented the African National Congress (ANC) as a backbencher in the National Assembly from 1996 to 2009 and later from 2013 to 2014.

== Early life ==
Mahomed was born on 2 February 1955.

== Legislative career ==
Mahomed was not initially elected to Parliament in the 1994 general election, but she joined the caucus during the legislative term, in 1996, to fill a casual vacancy. She served three consecutive terms in the seat, gaining election to full terms in 1999 and 2004. She was a member of the project committee on Muslim personal law established by the Law Commission to draft the Muslim Marriages Bill.

In the 2009 general election, Mahomed was not initially re-elected to her seat. However, she returned on 15 August 2013, when she was sworn in to the assembly to fill the casual vacancy arising from Loretta Jacobus's resignation. In the general election the next year, she was ranked 35th on the ANC's regional party list for Gauteng and she again lost her seat.
