= Jonas Sibanyoni =

South African politician and lawyer

Member of the National Assembly
- In office 23 June 2009 – 6 May 2014
- Constituency: Gauteng
- In office February 2004 – May 2009

Personal details
- Born: Jonas Ben Sibanyoni; 14 August 1952 (age 74)
- Citizenship: South Africa
- Party: African National Congress
- Education: University of Zululand

Jonas Ben Sibanyoni (born 14 August 1952) is a South African lawyer and politician who has served as a part-time member of the South African Human Rights Commission since January 2017. Before that, he represented the African National Congress (ANC) in the National Assembly from 2004 to 2014, excepting a brief hiatus in mid-2009.

== Early life and legal career ==
Born on 14 August 1952, Sibanyoni began his legal career in 1974 as a clerk and interpreter at Witbank Magistrate's Court. He completed a BProc degree from the University of Zululand in 1981 and was admitted as an attorney on 10 July 1984. In the interim, he worked as a radio announcer, producer, and DJ from 1982 to 1984. He established his law practice in Bronkhorstspruit in 1985. In addition, from 1993 to 1995, he lectured law students at Vista University in Mamelodi, where he was director of the legal aid clinic.

In 1995, Sibanyoni was appointed as human resources manager at the Reconstruction and Development Programme Project, located in the Presidency under President Nelson Mandela and Minister Jay Naidoo. The following year, he joined the National Institute for Public Interest Law and Research, where he was national coordinator for institute's network of advice offices. From 1998 to 2001, he was a member of the Amnesty Committee of the Truth and Reconciliation Commission.

== Legislative career: 2004–2014 ==
Sibanyoni joined Parliament near the end of the second democratic Parliament in February 2004. In that year's general election, he was elected to a full term in the National Assembly, ranked second on the party list for Mpumalanga. In August 2008, following an investigation arising from a complaint by opposition MP Willem Doman, the Public Protector, Lawrence Mushwana, recommended that the Speaker of the National Assembly should take action against Sibanyoni on the basis that he had received an unlawful and irregular donation of R25,856 from officials of the Kungwini Local Municipality. Sibanyoni had solicited the donation to fund the launch of his ANC parliamentary constituency office outside Pretoria.

In the next general election in 2009, Sibanyoni was not initially re-elected, but he returned shortly into the legislative term, on 23 June 2009, to fill a seat in the Gauteng caucus that had been vacated by Oupa Monareng. He was a member of the Portfolio Committee on Justice and Constitutional Development.

== Human Rights Commission: 2017–present ==
Sibanyoni stood for re-election to Parliament in the 2014 general election but did not win a seat. After leaving Parliament, he was a candidate to succeed Pansy Tlakula at the Electoral Commission of South Africa in 2014 and to succeed Thuli Madonsela as Public Protector in 2016. Instead, however, later in 2016, the National Assembly recommended him for appointment to the South African Human Rights Commission. His appointment as a part-time commissioner was formalised by President Jacob Zuma and took effect on 3 January 2017 for a period of seven years.
