= Emmanuel Magubane =

South African politician

Member of the National Assembly
- In office 21 July 2010 – 6 May 2014
- Constituency: KwaZulu-Natal
- In office June 1999 – May 2009

Personal details
- Citizenship: South Africa
- Party: African National Congress

Ntando Emmanuel Magubane is a South African politician who represented the African National Congress (ANC) in the National Assembly from 1999 to 2014, excepting a hiatus from 2009 to 2010. He was first elected in the 1999 general election and was re-elected in 2004, but he was not initially re-elected in 2009; instead, he was returned to the assembly in July 2010, when he filled a casual vacancy arising from Trevor Bonhomme's resignation.

Before 1999, Magubane served in the KwaZulu-Natal Provincial Legislature, and he was an ANC activist in Richmond, KwaZulu-Natal during the democratic transition.
