= Renier Schoeman (politician) =

South African politician (born 1944)

Member of the National Assembly
- In office May 1994 – April 2004
- Constituency: KwaZulu-Natal

Personal details
- Born: 10 October 1944 (age 81) Durban, Natal; Union of South Africa
- Party: African National Congress
- Other political affiliations: New National Party; National Party
- Education: University of Natal

Renier Stephanus Schoeman (born 10 October 1944) is a South African politician, businessman and former civil servant who represented the National Party (NP) and New National Party (NNP) in Parliament from 1985 to 2004. He was the provincial leader of the NNP in KwaZulu-Natal from 1999 until the party's demise.

Schoeman served in the post-apartheid government as Deputy Minister of Education from 1994 to 1996 and as Deputy Minister of Health from 2002 to 2004. After failing to gain re-election in the 2004 general election, he founded and led the Progressive Business Forum, a corporate fund-raising vehicle for the African National Congress (ANC). In 2019, he was appointed to a five-year term as a Commissioner for the Promotion and Protection of the Rights of Cultural, Religious and Linguistic Communities.

== Early life and career ==
Schoeman was born on 10 October 1944 in Durban in the former Natal province. He completed a bachelor's in political science at the University of Natal and joined the civil service in 1963. He entered politics in 1981 and represented the NP in the apartheid-era House of Assembly from 1985 onwards.

== Post-apartheid political career ==
=== Mandela presidency: 1994–1999 ===
In South Africa's first post-apartheid elections in 1994, Schoeman was elected to represent the NP in the new National Assembly. He was also appointed as Deputy Minister of Education in Nelson Mandela's multi-party Government of National Unity; he deputised Sibusiso Bengu. In late 1994, he told press that "A lot of people who had been around here [Parliament] had to adjust to a new style of things", but said, "It really has been a lovely feeling to know that I'm in a Parliament that really represents everybody."

In May 1996, the NP announced that its members would withdraw from the unity government on 30 June, and Schoeman served the rest of the legislative term as an ordinary Member of Parliament.

=== Mbeki presidency: 1999–2004 ===
Schoeman was re-elected to his seat in the 1999 general election, representing the NNP (the relaunched NP) in the KwaZulu-Natal constituency. Shortly after the election, in November 1999, he was elected to succeed Danie Schutte as provincial leader of the NNP's KwaZulu-Natal branch.

Schoeman was also the NNP's national executive director, in which capacity he was a key figure in negotiating the partnership between the NNP and Democratic Party (DP) that resulted in the formation of the Democratic Alliance (DA), a multi-party opposition coalition. However, the NNP's participation in the alliance was short-lived, and Schoeman himself was personally sued for defamation after he and his deputy, Daryl Swanepoel, published a statement which referred to DA leader Tony Leon as a "political swindler"; that dispute was not concluded until April 2003, when Schoeman and Swanepoel retracted and apologised for the statement.

In the aftermath of the NNP's withdrawal from the DA, Schoeman, still as NNP executive director, became a key figure in negotiations with the governing ANC over a cooperation agreement. After the agreement was finalised, at the end of December 2001, President Thabo Mbeki appointed Schoeman as Deputy Minister of Health; he resigned as NNP executive director in order to take up the position.

In the next general election in 2004, Schoeman stood for re-election to the National Assembly but, due to a very poor performance by the NNP, did not secure a seat, ending his 19-year tenure in Parliament. In November of that year, he was re-elected as NNP provincial leader and, in his acceptance speech, he urged NNP members to be open to collaboration with the ANC.

== Later career ==
After the NNP voted to disband itself in 2005, Schoeman joined the ANC. By early 2007, he was head of corporate fund-raising for the ANC, in which capacity he and his former deputy, Daryl Swanepoel, became founders and co-convenors of the Progressive Business Forum. On Schoeman's change of allegiance, Richard Calland said, "The rancid standards of the old regime have infiltrated the new establishment. There must be some serious grave-spinning going on"; while analyst Susan Booysen described Schoeman and Swanepoel as "die-hard Nats [NP supporters]... that eventually joined the ANC not out of principle but out of desperation for a little place in the ambit of political power".

In June 2019, President Cyril Ramaphosa appointed Schoeman to a five-year term as a member of the Commission for the Promotion and Protection of the Rights of Cultural, Religious and Linguistic Communities.
