= Grant Snell =

South African politician

Member of the National Assembly of South Africa
- In office 6 May 2009 – 6 May 2014

Member of the Eastern Cape Provincial Legislature
- In office 1999–2009

Personal details
- Born: Grant Trevor Snell
- Party: African National Congress

Grant Trevor Snell is a South African politician who served as a Member of the National Assembly of South Africa between 2009 and 2014, representing the African National Congress. Prior to serving in parliament, Snell served in the Eastern Cape Provincial Legislature.

== Political career ==
Snell was elected to the Eastern Cape Provincial Legislature in 1999 as a representative of the African National Congress. During his tenure in the Provincial Legislature, he held a number of positions, including presiding officer for the Whips Committee, deputy chairperson of the committee of chairpersons, chair of the budget and oversight committee, chairperson of the NCOP Business Committee, as well as chairperson of the Review of Rules Committee. He also served on the legislature's executive committee, the Rules Committee as well as the Programming Committee.

In the 2009 general election, Snell was elected to a seat in the National Assembly of South Africa. He was a member of the Constitutional Review Committee and the Standing Committee on Appropriations during his term in parliament. Snell left parliament at the 2014 general election, having not been selected as an ANC parliamentary candidate.

== Personal life ==
Snell has a certificate in business management from Rhodes University. His interests include gardening and reading.
