= Russel Cebekhulu =

South African politician

Russel Cebekhulu MP

Member of the National Assembly of South Africa
- Incumbent
- Assumed office 4 August 2015
- In office 6 May 2009 – 6 May 2014

Personal details
- Born: Russel Nsikayezwe Cebekhulu
- Party: Inkatha Freedom Party
- Profession: Politician

Russel Nsikayezwe Cebekhulu is a South African politician who has been an Inkatha Freedom Party Member of Parliament (MP) since 2015 and previously from 2009 to 2014.

== Parliamentary career ==
In 2009, Cebekhulu was elected to the National Assembly of South Africa as a member of the Inkatha Freedom Party. During the 2009–2014 parliament, he served on the Portfolio Committee on Agriculture, Forestry, Fisheries and Rural Development and Land Reform. Cebekhulu was placed low on the IFP's regional list for the 2014, meaning that he didn't return to parliament immediately after the election.

On 4 August 2015, Cebekhulu returned to the National Assembly as a replacement for Alfred Mpontshane. He then became a member of the following committees: tourism, cooperative governance and traditional affairs, Joint Standing Committee on Intelligence, water and sanitation, and defence and military veterans.

In 2019, Cebekhulu stood for re-election at second on the IFP's KwaZulu-Natal regional list. He was re-elected at the election. He is currently a member of the Joint Standing Committee on Defence, the Portfolio Committee on Agriculture, Land Reform and Rural Development and the Portfolio Committee on Public Service and Administration, Performance Monitoring & Evaluation. He is also an alternate member of the Portfolio Committee on Defence and Military Veterans.

Cebekhulu was re-elected to the National Assembly at the 2024 general election.
