= Nokhaya Mnisi =

South African politician (d. 2018)

Member of the National Assembly of South Africa
- In office 6 May 2009 – 18 September 2018
- Constituency: Mpumalanga

Personal details
- Died: 18 September 2018
- Party: African National Congress
- Profession: Politician

Nokhaya Adelaide Mnisi (died 18 September 2018) was a South African politician who served as a Member of the National Assembly of South Africa for the African National Congress from 2009 until her death in 2018.

== Parliamentary career ==
Mnisi hailed from the Gert Sibande region in Mpumalanga. She was elected to the National Assembly of South Africa in the 2009 general election for the African National Congress. She was a member of the Portfolio Committee on Home Affairs and the Portfolio Committee on Human Settlements.

After her re-election in the 2014 general election, she was appointed to the Portfolio Committee on Home Affairs, the Portfolio Committee on Defence and Military Veterans and the Joint Standing Committee on Defence as well as the Multiparty Women's Caucus.

During the Department of Home Affairs' budget vote debate in May 2017, Mnisi said that not all people coming through South Africa's borders had honourable intentions and 95% of those claiming asylum were not real asylum seekers.

== Death ==
Mnisi died unexpectedly from a short illness on 18 September 2018. Parliament's presiding officers sent their condolences.

== See also ==
- List of members of the National Assembly of South Africa who died in office
