= Graham McIntosh =

Graham Brian Douglas McIntosh (born 18 January 1944) is a South African farmer, businessman and retired politician. He was active in South African politics and served for four decades in the National Parliament in Cape Town from 1974 to 2014.

== Early life and education ==
McIntosh was born in Brooklyn, Pretoria into a middle-class, politically liberal, bi-lingual (Afrikaans and English, later Zulu was added) South African family, where he was the youngest of three sons. He completed his secondary education at Michaelhouse in the province of KwaZulu-Natal. In 1961 he was selected to represent South Africa at the New York Herald Tribune World Youth Forum in the USA.

He completed a Bachelor of Arts degree at the University of Cape Town in 1963, a Secondary Teacher’s Diploma in 1964, and in 1968 at St John’s College, Cambridge, a Master of Arts degree. In 1980 he completed the National Diploma in Valuations and became a Member, now non-practising, of the South African Institute of Valuers (SAIV).

== Political career ==
McIntosh’s first memory of politics is a United Party fundraising braai (barbecue) at his parents’ home when he was six.

From his teenage years he has been a consistent proponent of liberal democracy. The first political party that McIntosh joined was the Liberal Party in 1963. He began his public political career when he joined the United Party in 1972 whilst farming near Weenen, KZN. At the time, Sir De Villiers Graaff was the leader of the Party.

In 1974, at the age of 30, he was elected to Parliament as the MP for Pinetown (UP). He held the seat from 1974–1977. He was one of the very few South African MPs to report back to his black constituency, even though they did not have the franchise.

In 1977, when the United Party transformed into the New Republic Party, he joined the Progressive Federal Party (PFP), which was led by Colin Eglin. He won the Maritzburg North constituency for the PFP from the sitting National Party MP in 1981, and held the seat until 1987.

Referred to as the "Peter Pan of Politics", McIntosh was a constant and nagging voice of opposition to the apartheid government. Many of his speeches in Parliament were littered with calls for "Order" from the Speaker, as his direct manner and blunt and articulate arguments were often deemed outrageous and offensive to the ruling National Party.

From 1999 to 2004 he was on the Parliamentary list for the Democratic Party/Democratic Alliance. He was also the party's spokesperson on Safety and Security. Just before the first democratic general election of 2004, he resigned from the DA in protest at his unelectable position on the list. Instead he contested the 2004 general election on the African Christian Democratic Party (ACDP) list but did not go to Parliament.

His last term in Parliament was as an MP for the Congress of the People (COPE) from 2011 to 2014. He was on their National Committee, and served on the Portfolio Committees of Home Affairs and Trade and Industry. He retired on 7 May 2014, doing his last official walk through the corridors of Parliament preceded by a Scottish piper.

== Agriculture and conservation ==
He played a key role in the merging in the mid-nineties of the former black agricultural and white agricultural unions of KwaZulu-Natal, and was the last President of the Natal Agricultural Union (NAU) and first President of the emergent KwaZulu-Natal Agricultural Union (KWANALU). On his Weenen farm, he practised veld (wild pasture) management, as well as protecting wildlife. He represented the Agricultural Union as a member of the board of Ezemvelo KZN Wildlife (formerly known as the Natal Parks Board) between 1996 and 1998.

== Community service ==
In 1971 he helped found the Scripture Union Independent Schools (SUIS) movement in South Africa and served as Chairman for 24 years. He currently serves on the Council of the South African Institute of Race Relations. He built and managed two farm schools (Mkolombe Primary School in the Weenen District and Emngwenya Primary School in the Estcourt District) on his property He was a member of the Board of Governors of Michaelhouse during the period that his three sons attended school there. He was granted a St Michael’s Award by his old school for service to the community.

== Personal life ==
In 1971 McIntosh married Susanna (Santie) Jansen van Rensburg (born 1946). Graham and Santie have three sons.
