= Suzan Berend =

South African politician

Member of the National Assembly of South Africa
- In office 12 March 2013 – 6 May 2014
- Preceded by: Nosimo Balindlela

Personal details
- Party: African National Congress (2014–present)
- Other party: Congress of the People (Until 2014)

Suzan Roseline Berend is a South African politician who served in the National Assembly of South Africa from 2013 until 2014 as a member of the Congress of the People. She was appointed to fill the casual vacancy that arose when Nosimo Balindlela resigned.

Berend was one of 19 prominent COPE members who resigned from the party and joined the African National Congress in April 2014, in the run-up to the 2014 general election.
