= Jack Tolo =

South African politician (1948–2011)

Member of Parliament
- In office May 1994 – 22 August 2011

Personal details
- Born: Lekoba Jack Tolo; 21 November 1948 GaMasha, Northern Transvaal; Union of South Africa
- Died: 22 August 2011 (aged 62) GaMasha, Limpopo; Republic of South Africa
- Party: Congress of the People (2009–2011)
- Other political affiliations: African National Congress (1977–2009)

Lekoba Jack Tolo (21 November 1948 – 22 August 2011) was a South African politician and Christian minister. He was a Member of Parliament from 1994 until his death in 2011 and served in both the Senate and the National Assembly. He represented the African National Congress until 2009, when he defected to the Congress of the People. He died in August 2011 in an armed robbery.

== Early life and career ==
Tolo was born on 21 November 1948 in the village of GaMasha in Sekhukhune in the former Transvaal Province. His first language was Sepedi. He became a bishop in the Apostolic Church in 1976. At the same time, he joined the African National Congress (ANC), then an anti-apartheid organisation, in 1977. Before entering politics full-time, he worked as a driver, including as a tractor driver on a dairy farm in the Transvaal.

== Legislative career: 1994–2011 ==
In South Africa's first post-apartheid elections in 1994, Tolo was elected to represent the ANC in the Northern Transvaal caucus of the Senate. Before the end of the legislative term, he was transferred to a seat in the National Assembly, the lower house, where he served the rest of his career. In 1999 and 2004, he was elected to two further consecutive terms in the National Assembly, where he represented the Limpopo constituency.

However, ahead of the 2009 general election, Tolo resigned from the ANC and defected to the Congress of the People, a new breakaway party. When the election was held, he was returned to Parliament under COPE's banner from the party's national party list.

== Personal life and death ==
Tolo was married to Salome Tolo, with whom he had seven children. He was shot dead in the early hours of 22 August 2011 during an armed robbery at his home in GaMasha. Seven suspects were arrested and three were convicted of his murder in 2013.

== See also ==
- List of members of the National Assembly of South Africa who died in office
