= Nonkululeko Gcume =

South African politician

Member of the National Assembly of South Africa
- In office 6 May 2009 – April 2014

Personal details
- Party: African Transformation Movement (2019–present)
- Other party: African National Congress (Until 2008; 2014–2019); Congress of the People (2008–2014)
- Profession: Politician

Nonkululeko Prudence Gcume is a South African politician who served as a Member of Parliament (MP) for the Congress of the People from 2009 to 2014.

== Political career ==
Gcume was a member of the African National Congress until she resigned to join the ANC breakaway party, the Congress of the People in 2008. She was appointed co-convenor of the party's women's league. In late-November 2008, Gcume's house in Lusikisiki, near Port St Johns in the Eastern Cape, was set on fire amid political violence in the province in the run-up to the 2009 general elections.

Gcume was elected to the National Assembly of South Africa in the election as COPE won 30 seats. During her tenure in the National Assembly, she sat on the Portfolio Committee on Social Development. In February 2014, COPE Secretary-General Lyndall Shope-Mafole wrote to Gcume and other COPE MPs asking them to provide proof that they were fully paid-up party members in good standing.

Prior to the 2014 general election, Gcume and four other former COPE MPs were officially welcomed back into the ANC during a ceremony at the party's provincial headquarters in King William's Town on 30 April 2014.

Gcume later left the ANC again and joined the newly formed African Transformation Movement, standing unsuccessfully stood for parliament in the 2019 general election as a candidate on the party's Eastern Cape regional-to-national list.
