= Wayne Thring =

South African politician (born 1963)

Wayne Thring MP

Member of the National Assembly of South Africa
- Incumbent
- Assumed office 22 May 2019
- In office 21 June 2013 – 21 November 2013

Personal details
- Born: Wayne Maxim Thring; 1 February 1963 (age 63) Sydenham, Durban, Natal Province, South Africa
- Party: African Christian Democratic Party (1995–present)
- Children: 3
- Occupation: Member of Parliament
- Committees: Portfolio Committee on Trade and Industry; Portfolio Committee on Agriculture, Land Reform and Rural Development; Portfolio Committee on Public Works and Infrastructure

Wayne Maxim Thring (born 1 February 1963) is a South African teacher and politician who serves as the deputy president of the African Christian Democratic Party (ACDP). He was sworn in as a Member of the National Assembly of South Africa in May 2019. Thring had previously served as an MP in the same house in 2013.

== Biography ==
Thring was born on 1 February 1963. He obtained a teaching diploma from the Bechet Teachers’ Training College. He later achieved both a BA degree in psychology and biblical studies and a BA Honours in psychology from the University of South Africa. Thring received a postgraduate diploma in economic principles from the University of London.

Thring joined the ACDP in 1995. He was elected the deputy provincial chairperson of the party in KwaZulu-Natal prior to being elected provincial chairperson in 1997. He held the post for a decade. Thring is currently the ACDP's national deputy president and the provincial leader of the party. In 2000, he was elected as a city councillor in the eThekwini Metropolitan Municipality. He served on the council until 2013.

Thring was sworn in as an MP on 21 June 2013 but only held the post for five months before resigning on 21 November 2013. However, he returned to Parliament following the 2019 general election. Thring was re-elected to a second five-year term in the National Assembly in the 2024 general elections.
