= Luzelle Adams =

South African lawyer and politician

Member of the National Assembly
- In office 6 May 2009 – 6 May 2014

Personal details
- Citizenship: South Africa
- Party: African National Congress
- Education: University of KwaZulu-Natal; University of Cape Town

Luzelle Henrietta Adams is a South African lawyer and politician who represented the Congress of the People (COPE) in the National Assembly from 2009 until 2014, when she failed to gain re-election. She is an advocate of the High Court and served as COPE's spokesperson on justice and constitutional development.

== Education and legal career ==
Adams worked for the Institute for Democratic Alternatives in South Africa and the City of Cape Town before completing her LLB at the University of KwaZulu-Natal in 2007. She was subsequently admitted as an advocate of the High Court and practiced civil litigation. She completed an LLM in shipping law at the University of Cape Town in 2015.

== Political career ==
Soon after COPE was founded in 2008, Adams joined its legal team. In the general election the next year, she was elected to represent the party in the National Assembly, the lower house of the South African Parliament. She was one of the three youngest MPs. During the legislative term that followed, she sat on the Portfolio Committee on Justice and Constitutional Development and served as COPE's spokesperson in that portfolio. In January 2012, she was additionally appointed as COPE's acting head of international affairs after the incumbent, Lyndall Shope-Mafole, was appointed acting general secretary.

Ahead of the 2014 general election, COPE faced a wave of mass defections but Adams was one of seven COPE MPs who remained on the party list. She was ranked fifth on the national list, but COPE performed poorly in the elections and she did not secure a seat.
