= Alfred Mpontshane =

South African retired politician (b. 1952)

Member of the National Assembly of South Africa
- In office September 1996 – 1 August 2015
- Succeeded by: Russel Cebekhulu
- Constituency: KwaZulu-Natal

Personal details
- Born: 14 May 1952 (age 73)
- Party: Inkatha Freedom Party
- Education: Inchanga High School
- Alma mater: University of South Africa (BA); University of Zululand (BAHon); University of the Free State (MA)
- Profession: Educator, politician

Alfred Mkhipheni Mpontshane (born 14 May 1952) is a South African retired politician and a former Member of Parliament for the Inkatha Freedom Party. Mpontshane worked as a teacher before becoming involved in politics.

== Early life and education ==
Mpontshane was born on 14 May 1952. He matriculated from Inchanga High School in 1972. He earned a secondary teachers diploma from the University of Zululand in 1975. In 1984, Mpontshane graduated from the University of South Africa with a Bachelor of Arts. Six years later, he would earn a honours degree in Political Sciences from the University of Zululand. In 1993, he received a Diploma in Diplomacy from the University of Birmingham. Mpontshane would go on to receive a Master of Arts in Governance and Political Transformation from the University of the Free State in 2006.

== Career ==
Mpontshane was a teacher and principal of the Star of the Sea Catholic High School between 1976 and 1986 when was promoted to the position of Inspector of Schools.

== Parliamentary career ==
Mpontshane was sworn in as a Member of the National Assembly of South Africa in September 1996, representing the Inkatha Freedom Party. He was elected to his first full term in 1999 and subsequently re-elected in 2004, 2009, and finally 2014. During his time in parliament, he was a member of the Education, Basic Education, Higher Education, Water and Sanitation, and State Security (Intelligence) committees.

As the IFP National Education Spokesman, Mpontshane criticised the Department of Basic Education's move to restrict former Model C schools from paying teacher bonuses and other financial incentives to teachers in 2012. In June 2015, Mpontshane called for a National School Bullying Summit after a video was released in which a pupil assaulted another pupil in full view of a teacher at Krugerlaan High School in Vereeniging, Gauteng.

Mpontshane resigned from Parliament with effect from 1 August 2015. He was succeeded by former MP Russel Cebekhulu.
