= Piet Pretorius (politician) =

South African politician (fl. 2012)

Deputy Speaker of the Western Cape Provincial Parliament
- Succeeded by: Beverley Schäfer

Piet Pretorius is a South African politician. He was elected the deputy speaker of the Western Cape Provincial Parliament, South Africa, in 2012. He is a member of the governing Democratic Alliance.
