= Meriam Phaliso =

South African politician (born 1962)

Member of the National Assembly
- In office 6 May 2009 – 6 May 2014

Personal details
- Born: 7 July 1962 (age 64)
- Citizenship: South Africa
- Party: African National Congress

Meriam Nozibonelo Phaliso (born 7 July 1962) is a South African politician who represented the African National Congress (ANC) in the National Assembly for a single term from 2009 to 2014. She was elected in 2009 from the ANC's national party list and served on the Portfolio Committee on Agriculture, Forestry and Fisheries and Portfolio Committee on Correctional Services. In the 2014 general election, she stood for re-election but was demoted to 166th on the ANC's party list and did not gain re-election.
