= Joyce Masilo =

South African Politician

Joyce Mabel Masilo

Parliament of South Africa

Personal details
- Party: African National Congress (ANC)
- Occupation: Politician

Joyce Mabel Masilo is a South African politician and former member of National Assembly through Afican National Congress (ANC) political party.

== Career ==
She was a member of Parliament/National Assembly from 6 May 2009 to 6 May 2014. She represented ANC party in the North West Province. She is notably recognized for her work in the National Assembly, including supporting legislation to relax abortion laws in South Africa, and also advocating for improved and accessible healthcare services. In February 2008, she was involved in representing the ANC party to support changes to abortion legislation in South Africa.

She was also a member of National Council of Provinces (NCOP) in South Africa. She served as the chairperson of the NCOP Select Committee on Social Services.
