= Shepherd Mayatula =

South African politician and academic (born 1945)

Member of the National Assembly
- In office 7 February 2012 – 6 May 2014
- In office June 1999 – May 2009
- Constituency: Eastern Cape

Member of the Eastern Cape Provincial Legislature
- In office May 1994 – June 1999

Member of the Eastern Cape Executive Council for Education
- In office March 1998 – June 1999
- Premier: Makhenkesi Stofile
- Preceded by: Nosimo Balindlela

Member of the Eastern Cape Executive Council for Finance
- In office May 1994 – March 1998
- Premier: Makhenkesi Stofile; Raymond Mhlaba

Personal details
- Born: Shepherd Malusi Mayatula; 10 October 1945 (age 80) Willowvale, Cape Province; Union of South Africa
- Party: African National Congress
- Education: University of Fort Hare; Northeastern University

Shepherd Malusi Mayatula (born 10 October 1945), sometimes misspelled Shepherd Mayathula, is a retired South African politician and economist from the Eastern Cape. He represented the African National Congress (ANC) in the National Assembly from 1999 to 2009 and later from 2011 to 2014. During that time, he chaired the Portfolio Committee on Education from 2004 to 2009.

Formerly an economics professor at the University of Fort Hare, Mayatula entered legislative politics with a term in the Eastern Cape Provincial Legislature from 1994 to 1999. He served as the Eastern Cape's inaugural Member of the Executive Council (MEC) for Finance from 1994 to 1998 and then as MEC for Education from 1998 to 1999.

== Early life and career ==
Mayatula was born on 10 October 1945 in rural Willowvale in the former Cape Province. He was educated at the University of Fort Hare and, on a Fulbright scholarship, at Boston's Northeastern University; he holds two master's degree in economics.

From 1975 to 1994, he was a member of the economics faculty at Fort Hare, where he served stints as head of the economics department and vice-dean of the commerce faculty. During the same period, he was active in politically progressive sports associations in the region, including the Tennis Association of South Africa and the South African Council on Sport.

== Political career ==
=== Executive Council: 1994–1999 ===
In South Africa's first post-apartheid elections in 1994, Mayatula was elected to represent the ANC in the new Eastern Cape Provincial Legislature. After the election, Eastern Cape Premier Raymond Mhlaba appointed him as the province's inaugural MEC for Finance. He remained in that portfolio until March 1998, when Mhlaba's successor, Premier Makhenkesi Stofile, appointed him to replace Nosimo Balindlela as MEC for Education. Eddie Trent of the opposition Democratic Party said that he was "very concerned" by the appointment because Mayatula's performance in the finance portfolio had been "abysmal".

=== Parliament: 1999–2014 ===
In the 1999 general election, Mayatula was elected to the National Assembly, the lower house of the South African Parliament. He was ranked first on the ANC's regional party list for the Eastern Cape. He served two consecutive terms, gaining re-election in 2004, and in May 2004 the ANC nominated him to chair Parliament's Portfolio Committee on Education. He remained in that position until the 2009 general election, when he declined to seek re-election and retired from frontline politics to work in the non-profit sector.

However, less than three years later, on 7 February 2012, he returned to the National Assembly when the ANC nominated him to fill the casual vacancy arising from Enoch Godongwana's resignation. He served in the seat until the 2014 general election.

== Retirement ==
After retiring from politics, Mayatula remained active in the non-profit sector and in the governance of Fort Hare. As of 2021, he was also the chairperson of the Integrity Commission of the ANC's Eastern Cape Provincial Executive Committee.
