= Willie Spies =

South African politician and lawyer

Member of the National Assembly
- In office 23 April 2004 – 1 September 2009
- Constituency: Gauteng

Personal details
- Born: Willie Durand Spies; 22 February 1969 (age 57)
- Citizenship: South Africa
- Party: Freedom Front Plus (until March 2010; 2025–present)
- Education: University of Pretoria

Willie Durand Spies (born 22 February 1969) is a South African lawyer and politician from Gauteng. He represented the Freedom Front Plus (FF+) in the National Assembly from 2004 to 2009.

Spies resigned from Parliament in September 2009 to run his legal practice at the Pretoria-based firm Hurter Spies, founded in 2008. Hurter Spies has handled civil rights litigation for AfriForum since 2009, and Spies has therefore been a prominent figure in advocacy for the rights of Afrikaners and other minorities.

== Early life and education ==
Spies was born on 22 February 1969 and holds law and business degrees from the University of Pretoria.

== Legislative career ==
In the 2004 general election, Spies was elected to a FF+ seat in the National Assembly. He was one of the party's four representatives in the National Assembly and its sole representative in the Gauteng caucus.

Spies attained public prominence as the party's spokesperson on labour, in which capacity he was a vocal critic of affirmative action in South Africa. In 2006, Spies, on behalf of FF+, laid a complaint with the International Labour Organisation, arguing that, in Spies's words, elements of the governing African National Congress sought "to ensconce affirmative action as a permanent measure and through this enforce a new form of apartheid". Spies was also the FF+'s spokesperson on minerals and energy, in which capacity he spearheaded the party's response to the Oilgate scandal.

In August 2008, Spies attracted media attention after he drove some 15 kilometres along the N2 to the Houses of Parliament with a bleeding man holding on to the bonnet of his Mercedes Benz. The man had been beaten during a mugging. Spies said that, in addition to feeling fear and concern for the man, he had worried that they would be seen by tourists, since, "It does not create a good picture of this country in the minds of those people."

Weeks after he was elected to a second term in the National Assembly in April 2009, Spies announced that he would resign from legislative politics to return to full-time legal practice. He vacated his seat on 1 September 2009 and was replaced by Anton Alberts. He remained the leader of the FF+'s branch in Pretoria.

== Legal career ==
On 1 April 2008, while a sitting MP, Spies and Pretoria lawyer Johan Hurter co-founded a law firm called Hurter Spies, based in Pretoria. Through the firm, Spies led a successful application before the Constitutional Court that confirmed the right of overseas citizens to vote in general elections, beginning in 2009.

In July 2009, shortly after Spies announced his upcoming resignation from Parliament, AfriForum announced that it had appointed him as its full-time legal counsel. Hurter Spies would henceforth handle all of the group's civil rights litigation – which focused on minority rights, especially the rights and interests of Afrikaners – and would move its offices to AfriForum's headquarters in Pretoria. In his personal capacity, Spies would also act as a spokesperson for AfriForum. In early March 2010, the FF+ said that Spies had resigned from the party in order to focus on his legal work for AfriForum. Beeld quoted Spies as saying that the party had "lost moral ground".

Prominent cases handled by Spies and his firm included AfriForum's hate speech complaint against politician Julius Malema, which resulted in a ruling that it was unconstitutional and unlawful to sing "Dubul' ibhunu", an anti-apartheid song whose lyrics mean "Shoot the Boer" (where "boer" refers roughly to any Afrikaans-speaking white person) in Nguni languages. Hurter Spies has also represented Solidarity and other non-governmental organisations.

== University of Pretoria ==
Spies remained a prominent figure at his alma mater, the University of Pretoria (also known as Tuks), where he was chairperson of the Tuks Alumni Board. In that capacity, he became involved in a row with the Higher Education Transformation Network (HETN), a majority-black national lobby group which argued that, under Spies, the alumni board constituted an obstacle to "transformation" due to the influence of AfriForum and the FF+.

When Spies was elected to the Tuks Council, the university's governing body, in late 2012, HETN approached the North Gauteng High Court to have the election declared invalid and "disqualify" Spies as a council member. Spies counter-sued for defamation in connection with remarks by HETN's executive director, Reginald Legoabe, who had said that Spies had formerly been active in various groups – the Afrikaner Studentewag and Conservative Party – whose "common goal [was] to resist the enrolment of all non-Afrikaans students and keep the University of Pretoria as an Afrikaans-only institution".

== Later career ==
In November 2025, Spies resigned as chairman of Pretoria FM.

On 14 February 2026, Spies was named the Freedom Front Plus mayoral candidate for the City of Tshwane ahead of the upcoming municipal elections.
