= Crosby Moni =

South African politician and trade union leader (d. 2013)

Crosby Mpoxo Moni

Member of the National Assembly of South Africa
- In office 17 November 2010 – 21 December 2013
- Preceded by: Makhenkesi Stofile
- Succeeded by: Priscilla Sekgobela

Personal details
- Died: 21 December 2013 Mozambique
- Party: African National Congress; South African Communist Party
- Spouse: Nokwakha
- Children: 5

Crosby Mpoxo Moni (died 21 December 2013) was a South African politician and trade union leader who served as a Member of the National Assembly of South Africa from 2011 until his death in 2013. Moni was a member of the African National Congress and the South African Communist Party.

== Political career ==
Moni worked as a mineworker at the Matla Colliery in present-day Mpumalanga alongside future African National Congress politician Gwede Mantashe. Moni joined the National Union of Mineworkers in 1982. He was first a shop steward for the union, before gradually moving up the union's leadership ranks until he became the national deputy president of the union. He retired from the union in 2009. Moni also served on the Central Committee of the South African Communist Party, and was active in Mpumalanga politics, serving as the deputy provincial chairperson of the ANC. He also assisted in the rebuilding of South African National Organisation structures.

== Parliamentary career ==
Moni joined the National Assembly of South Africa in 2011 and represented Benoni on the East Rand as a member of the ANC. In parliament, he was a member of the basic education and higher education portfolio committees.

== Death ==
Moni contracted malaria during a visit to Mozambique in December 2013 and died from it on 21 December 2013. He is survived by his wife, three sons and two daughters. NUM and the South African Democratic Teachers Union both released statements in which they mourned Moni.

== See also ==
- List of members of the National Assembly of South Africa who died in office
