= Liezl van der Merwe =

South African politician (born 1980)

Liezl van der Merwe MP
- Van der Merwe at the Inkatha Freedom Party Presidential Roundtable on Gender-Based Violence and Femicide on Friday, 09 October 2026 at the Birchwood Hotel & OR Tambo Conference Centre

Member of the National Assembly of South Africa
- Incumbent
- Assumed office 7 May 2012

Personal details
- Born: Liezl Linda van der Merwe; 5 October 1980 (age 46) Goodwood, Cape Town, South Africa
- Party: Inkatha Freedom Party (2006–present)
- Occupation: Politician
- Profession: Journalist
- Committees: Committee on Multi-Party Women's Caucus; Joint Committee on Ethics and Members Interests; Portfolio Committee on Home Affairs; Portfolio Committee on Social Development

Liezl Linda van der Merwe (born 5 October 1980) is a South African politician who serves as a Member of the National Assembly of South Africa, representing the Inkatha Freedom Party (IFP). She became an MP in May 2012.

== Life and career ==
Van der Merwe was born in Goodwood, Cape Town. She attended Panorama Primary School and graduated from Paarl Gimnasium. While at school, she took an interest in politics. She later obtained a Diploma in Journalism.

She moved to London and worked for broadcaster ITV. After returning to South Africa, she became a member of the IFP. Within the IFP, she serves as the party's Director of Communications and is a member of IFP National Council. She is also a former member of the party's National Youth Brigade and a present member of the party's Women's Brigade.

Van der Merwe became a parliamentarian in May 2012, replacing Pat Lebenya-Ntanzi. She was sworn in alongside IFP spokesperson Mkhuleko Hlengwa. She was elected to her first full term in May 2014 and won another term in May 2019. Van der Merwe was re-elected to Parliament in the 2024 general election.
