= Kiki Rwexana =

South African politician (born 1952)

Member of the National Assembly
- In office 6 May 2009 – 1 November 2013
- In office 23 April 2004 – 28 October 2008

Personal details
- Born: 22 December 1952 (age 73)
- Citizenship: South Africa
- Party: Congress of the People (since 2008); African National Congress (until 2008)

Sindiswa Patricia "Kiki" Rwexana (born 22 December 1952) is a South African politician who served two non-consecutive terms in the National Assembly from 2004 to 2008 and from 2009 to 2013. She represented the African National Congress (ANC) until October 2008, when she became the first sitting MP to resign from the party and from Parliament to join the breakaway Congress of the People (COPE), which she represented during her second term. She was active in the women's wings of both parties.

== Early life ==
Rwexana was born on 22 December 1952.

== Legislative career ==
=== African National Congress: 2004–2008 ===
She was first elected to the National Assembly in 2004, standing as a candidate on the ANC's national party list. For part of the legislative term that followed, she chaired the ANC's women's caucus in the assembly. In December 2007, she was nominated to stand for election to the ANC National Executive Committee, but she was not elected. In addition, she was the national deputy secretary of the ANC Women's League until July 2008, when she was succeeded by Mpai Mogori.

Later that year, on 28 October 2008, Rwexana and Phillip Dexter announced that they were resigning from the ANC. Rwexana said:

Today the ANC is very cold... It depends on which side you are supporting. The ANC we used to know is no more. The ANC that taught democracy in South Africa is no more... that taught respect to each, respect to the elderly, is no more. There’s hatred and anger in the ANC [now]. If you have a different view, you are no longer regarded as a member of the ANC. You are regarded as someone who is anti-ANC.

She became the first sitting ANC MP to announce that she would join former ANC leaders Sam Shilowa and Mosiuoa Lekota at a national convention to consider political alternatives to the ANC. Because she resigned from the ANC, she lost her legislative seat the same day.

=== Congress of the People: 2008–2013 ===
Shilowa and Lekota's political alternative took shape as COPE, a new opposition party, and Rwexana was appointed to its interim steering committee as the party's convenor for women. After the party was formally launched, she became head of its Women's Forum. In the next general election in 2009, she was elected to represent COPE in the National Assembly, but she again did not complete her term, resigning on 1 November 2013.
