= Sarah Paulse =

South African politician

Member of the National Assembly of South Africa
- In office 10 September 2010 – 6 May 2014
- Preceded by: Patricia de Lille

Member of the Western Cape Provincial Parliament
- In office April 2004 – September 2010

Personal details
- Party: Independent Democrats (until disbandment)
- Spouse: Desmond
- Relations: Patricia de Lille (sister)
- Profession: Politician

Sarah Unes Paulse is a South African politician who served in the Western Cape Provincial Parliament from 2004 until 2010 and in the National Assembly of South Africa from 2010 until 2014 as a member of the Independent Democrats. She is a sister of Patricia de Lille, the current leader of Good and the former leader of the Independent Democrats.

== Political career ==
Paulse was a member of the Independent Democrats, a now-defunct political party which was led by her sister Patricia de Lille. She was the chairperson of a party branch in the Boland. Despite having been ranked ninth on the ID's candidate list for the Western Cape Provincial Parliament in the 2004 general elections, Paulse was chosen to fill one of the three seats the party won in the Provincial Parliament. De Lille was subsequently accused of nepotism, which she denied. De Lille reasoned that Paulse was selected to take up the seat because Paulse had been with the party since before its formation and that because the party was gender sensitive, the party had a rule that 30 percent of all the party structures had to be represented by women.

After the 2009 general election, the party decided to send Paulse back to the Provincial Parliament over Brett Herron, who had been ranked higher on the candidate list and appeared on the IEC's list for the provincial parliament. ID Secretary-General Haniff Hoosen defended the party's decision, saying that it was to ensure "representivity".

In September 2010, Paulse was appointed to take up ID party leader and her sister's seat in the National Assembly after her sister was appointed a provincial cabinet minister by Western Cape Premier and Democratic Alliance leader Helen Zille; this move happened after the ID and the DA had announced its merger earlier that year with the ID set to be dissolved at the 2014 general election.

Paulse was not a parliamentary candidate for the DA at the 2014 general elections and left the National Assembly as a result.

== Personal life ==
Prior the 2011 municipal elections, in which De Lille was the DA's candidate for Mayor of Cape Town, the ANC accused De Lille of nepotism; The party said that Paulse's husband, Desmond, had been De Lille's driver for many years and that De Lille had made sure that their son, Shaun, found employment at the Witzenberg Local Municipality before he found employment at the Stellenbosch Local Municipality. De Lille denied the allegations.
