= Trevor Bonhomme =

South African politician (1942–2017)

Member of the National Assembly
- In office 28 October 2011 – 29 July 2017
- Constituency: KwaZulu-Natal
- In office 2 September 2005 – 19 May 2010

Personal details
- Born: January 1942 Overport, Natal Province; Union of South Africa
- Died: 29 July 2017 (aged 75)
- Party: African National Congress

Trevor John Bonhomme (January 1942 – 29 July 2017) was a South African politician and activist who represented the African National Congress (ANC) in the National Assembly from 2005 until his death in 2017, except for a brief hiatus from 2010 to 2011. During apartheid, he was a prominent community organiser in Newlands East in the former Natal province.

== Early life and activism ==
Bonhomme was born to Virgil and Patricia Bonhomme in January 1942 in the racially mixed neighbourhood of Overport, located in Durban in the former Natal province. His family was Catholic and he was the fourth-eldest of eleven siblings. After matriculating at Umbilo High School in Durban, he began work, with his brother Virgil, at Grafton-Everest upholstery company. After he and Virgil successfully agitated for higher wages at their company, they entered the trade union movement and helped found the Furniture Trade Union in the late 1960s. Also during the 1960s, his family was forcibly removed from their Overport home under the apartheid-era Group Areas Act, intensifying Bonhomme's interest in anti-apartheid activism.

In the early 1970s, Bonhomme moved to Newlands East, where he became heavily involved in community organising through the local residents' association, the Durban Housing Action Committee, and other groups. He flirted with the Labour Party, but strongly diverged with its position on the 1983 constitutional reform: he campaigned strongly for a total boycott of the Tricameral Parliament when the structure was introduced by the apartheid government. He joined the United Democratic Front instead and also, with his brother, did underground work for the African National Congress (ANC). In 1989, he was detained for six months at Modderbee Prison in Johannesburg. He formally joined the ANC in 1990 after it was unbanned by the apartheid government, and he was a delegate to the party's historic 48th National Conference in Durban in 1991.

== Post-apartheid political career ==
After South Africa's first post-apartheid elections in 1994, Bonhomme was elected to represent the ANC as a local councillor in the North Local Council and then in eThekwini Metropolitan Municipality. On 2 September 2005, he was sworn into an ANC seat in the National Assembly, the lower house of the South African Parliament; he filled the vacancy created by Manne Dipico's resignation. In the next general election in 2009, he was re-elected to a full term in the assembly, representing the KwaZulu-Natal constituency; he resigned from his seat on 19 May 2010 but returned on 28 October 2011 to serve the remainder of the legislative term. In the 2014 general election, he was ranked 27th on the ANC's provincial list for KwaZulu-Natal and secured re-election.

== Personal life and death ==
Bonhomme lived in Newlands East until his death. He married Loraine in the early 1970s and they had six children together, as well as grandchildren and great-grandchildren. His niece Tarna Barker represented the opposition Democratic Alliance in Parliament. He was diagnosed with terminal cancer and died on 29 July 2017.

== See also ==
- List of members of the National Assembly of South Africa who died in office
