= Rose Sonto =

South African politician

Member of the National Assembly
- In office 3 February 2010 – 6 May 2014
- In office 23 April 2004 – May 2009

Personal details
- Citizenship: South Africa
- Party: African National Congress

Mzunani Roseberry "Rose" Sonto is a retired South African politician and former anti-apartheid activist. He represented the African National Congress (ANC) in the National Assembly from 2004 to 2014, excepting a hiatus from 2009 to 2010. He previously represented the party in the Western Cape Provincial Legislature.

== Early life and activism ==
Sonto was active in student politics in the Eastern Cape in the 1960s, at first primarily through organs of the Black Consciousness Movement. While living in Cape Town in the early 1980s, he became president of the Cape Youth Congress, and he was later active in the United Democratic Front. He was detained several times for political offences during the 1980s, and in 1990 he was a member of the reception committee that made arrangements for Nelson Mandela's release from prison; Sonto drive the car that carried Mandela away from Victor Verster Prison.

After the end of apartheid in 1994, Sonto represented the ANC in the Western Cape Provincial Legislature and was also chairperson of the Western Cape branch of the South African National Civic Organisation.

== Parliament: 2004–2014 ==
Sonto was elected to an ANC seat in the National Assembly in the 2004 general election. Though he was not immediately re-elected in 2009, he was sworn back in on 3 February 2010 to fill a casual vacancy. He served in the seat until the next general election in 2014, after which he retired.

During his term, he sat as a member of the Portfolio Committee on Mineral Resources, and he caused a minor stir in 2012 by saying that the committee would not visit the site of the Marikana massacre, where striking mineworkers had been killed, because, "We can't go and talk to a crowd with suicidal tendencies". He later withdrew his remark and apologised.

== Retirement and pension ==
In later years, Sonto occasionally attracted media attention because of his campaign to have the government pay him a special pension, allowed in terms of South African law to individuals "who made sacrifices or served the public interest in establishing a democratic constitutional order in South Africa" during apartheid and who therefore had not saved for their own retirement. Sonto sought a pension for a full twelve years of service to the anti-apartheid movement, from 1971 to 1990, but the pensions board agreed only to cover the last five years, from 1985 to 1990. On appeal, the board withdrew the pension entirely on the grounds that there was insufficient evidence to prove that he had been a full-time activist during the relevant period. In 2019, he lodged a complaint with the Public Protector, Busisiwe Mkhwebane, who instructed the board to review its decision.
