= Mark Steele (politician) =

South African politician

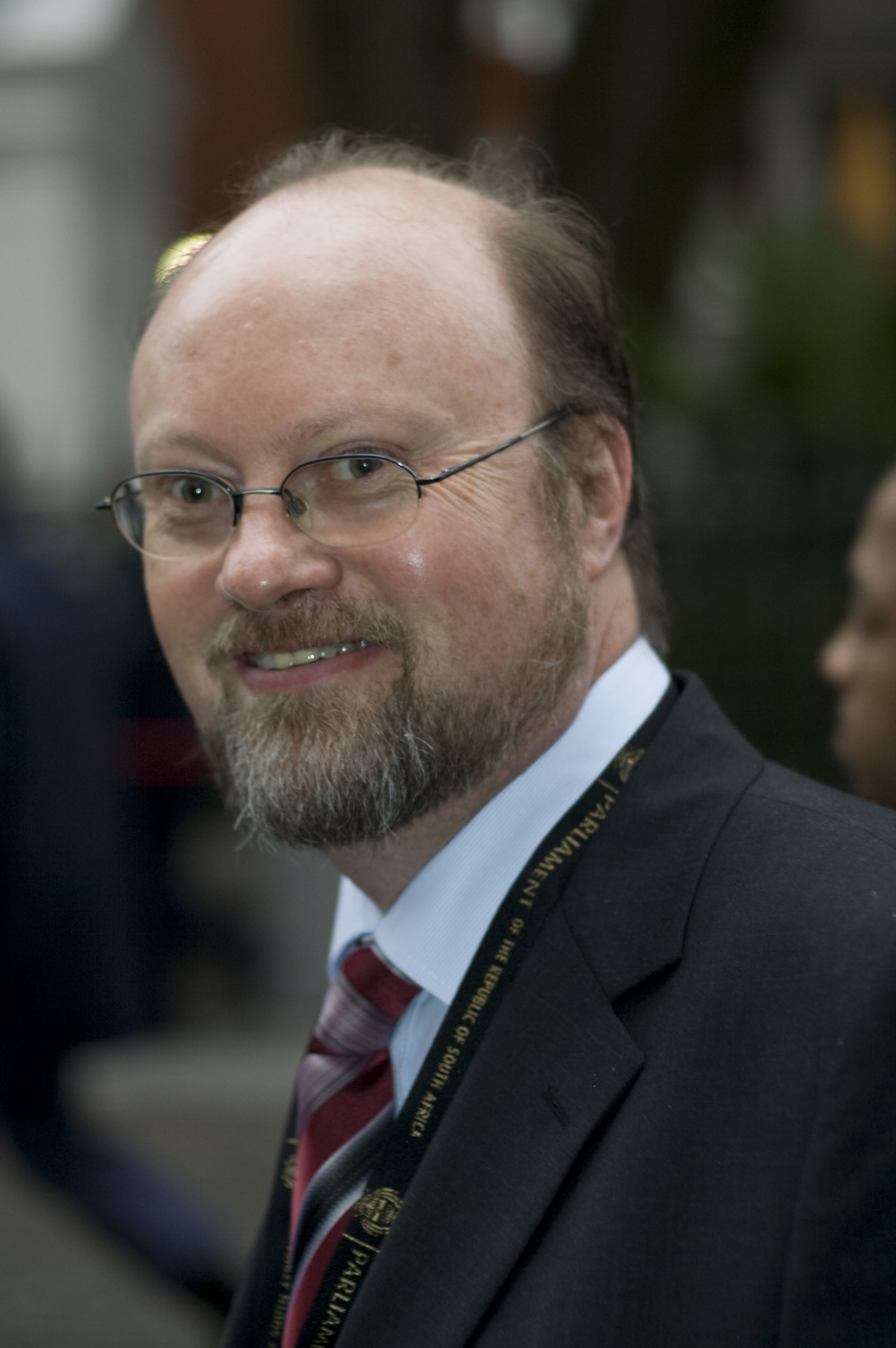
Mark Steele

Mark Steele is a South African politician with the opposition Democratic Alliance. He is a member of the KwaZulu-Natal Legislature. Steele was elected to Parliament for the DA in 2009. His constituency in the Kwa-Zulu Natal Provincial Legislature is Ugu North, KwaZulu Natal. He transferred to KwaZulu-Natal in 2011 when he traded places with former caucus leader John Steenhuisen. Steele has also been a ward councillor.
