= Eugene Ngcobo =

South African politician

Member of the National Assembly
- In office 23 April 2004 – 6 May 2014

Personal details
- Citizenship: South Africa
- Party: African National Congress
- Education: Sofia University; Cambridge University

Eugene Nhlanhla Nqaba Ngcobo is a South African politician and scientist who represented the African National Congress (ANC) in the National Assembly from 2004 to 2014. He was first elected to his seat in 2004 and was elected to a second term in 2009. During his second term, he chaired the Portfolio Committee on Science and Technology. He is a scientist by profession: he completed his MSc at Sofia University and completed a Ph.D. in nuclear reactor physics at Cambridge University.
