= Patricia Emily Adams =

South African politician

Member of the National Assembly of South Africa
- In office 26 May 2014 – 7 May 2019
- Preceded by: Zizi Kodwa
- In office 6 May 2009 – 6 May 2014

National Assembly Whip
- In office 17 May 2018 – 7 May 2019

Personal details
- Party: African National Congress
- Occupation: Politician

Patricia Emily Adams is a South African politician who served as a Member of the National Assembly of South Africa for the African National Congress (ANC) from 2009 to 2014, and again from 2014 to 2019.

== Parliamentary career ==
In 2009 Adams stood for election to the South African National Assembly as the 131st candidate on the ANC's national-to-national list. She was elected to the National Assembly in the election. Adams was then selected to serve on the Standing Committee on Finance for the Fourth Parliament (2009 – 2014). She was also the constituency contact for the ANC's Rietfontein constituency office during the parliamentary term.

In 2014 she stood for re-election at 122nd. She was not re-elected to the National Assembly. However, Zizi Kodwa resigned from the National Assembly and the ANC chose Adams to take up his seat. Adams was sworn in on 26 May 2014. On 20 June 2014, Adams was appointed to serve on the Portfolio Committee on Public Works and the Portfolio Committee on Tourism. She was named to the Joint Committee on Ethics and Members' Interests at a later stage. Adams was also the constituency contact for the ANC's Rietfontein constituency again.

On 17 May 2018, she was elected as an ANC whip. Her name was not on the ANC's lists for the 2019 general election and she left the National Assembly on 7 May 2019, the official date of the dissolution of the parliamentary term.
