= Dalitha Boshigo =

South African politician

Member of the National Assembly of South Africa
- In office 6 May 2009 – 6 May 2014
- Constituency: Limpopo

Personal details
- Party: African National Congress

Dalitha Fiki Boshigo is a South African and a former Member of the National Assembly of South Africa for the African National Congress. She was elected in the 2009 general election to represent the Limpopo constituency. During her tenure in Parliament, she served on the Portfolio Committee on Co-operative Governance and Traditional Affairs and the Ad Hoc Committee on Coordinated Oversight on Service Delivery. Boshigo did not stand for re-election in 2014.
