= Tim Harris (South African politician) =

South African politician

Timothy Duncan Harris
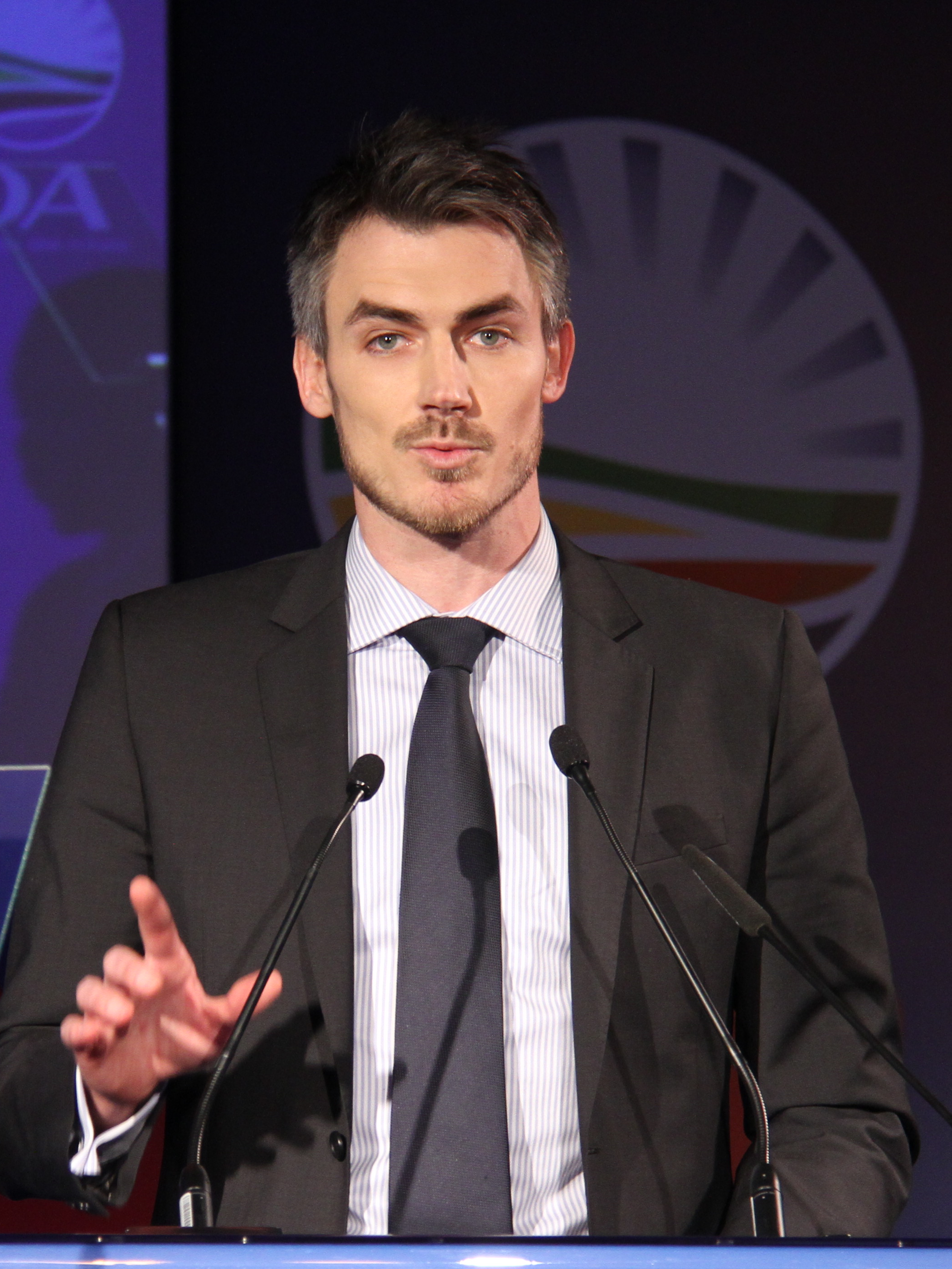

Member of the National Assembly
- In office 6 May 2009 – 6 May 2014
- Leader: Mmusi Maimane
- Succeeded by: Michael Bagraim
- Constituency: City Bowl and Atlantic Seaboard, Cape Town, Western Cape

Shadow Minister of Finance
- In office 2012–2014
- Succeeded by: Dion George

Personal details
- Born: c. 1979 (age 46–47) Cape Town, South Africa
- Party: Democratic Alliance
- Spouse: Cara Louise Harris
- Children: Neve
- Education: University of Cape Town

Tim Harris (born c. 1979) is a South African politician, a former Democratic Alliance member of the National Assembly, and a Parliamentary Counsellor to Mmusi Maimane, the Leader of the Opposition. He served as Shadow Minister of Finance from 2012 to 2014, and was succeeded by Dion George. A former chief of staff to party leader Tony Leon, Harris was the party's national events manager during the 2009 general election campaign, and was subsequently elected to Parliament aged 29, initially to the National Council of Provinces where he served as the Western Cape's Provincial Whip before being moved to the National Assembly in a Shadow Cabinet reshuffle. He has been characterised as the "sexiest man in politics".

== Background ==
Harris was born in Cape Town but grew up in KwaZulu-Natal, where he attended all-boys Hilton College. He returned to the Western Cape in 1998 to complete an undergraduate Bachelor of Arts degree at the University of Cape Town, majoring in English Literature and Economics. He then completed an honours degree in economics in 2001 while he was Chair of UCT Rag. After briefly working at an investment bank in Johannesburg, Harris again returned to Cape Town to complete his Masters in Economics.

In late 2007 and early 2008, he travelled with two friends up Africa's west coast on the first surfing trip between Cape Town and London by the west coast route, garnering international attention in the process. He told BBC News of the episode:

The biggest adventure was the 36 hours we spent trying to cross from the Congo to Gabon. We spent most of the day trying to cut our way through thick jungle, and our average speed was about half a kilometre a day. Then we tried to traverse a deep puddle, got stuck, and ran our battery down as we tried to get out. So we had to spend the night in the jungle.

In November 2009, he told The Leader World magazine:

[I]n the little bit I’ve travelled I’ve seen that this country (South Africa) is one where you can make a huge difference quite easily. We have, as it's often said, first world institutions, a great deal of first world infrastructure, and [a] first world press... [T]he potential for growth is massive—much more so than any developed market.

On 26 March 2011, he married his wife, Cara Louise. They had their first daughter, Neve, in June 2012.

== Politics ==
While completing a master's degree in Economics, his lecturer recommended him to the DA, which had been scouting for people with the necessary skills to join the party's Economic Policy team in preparation for the 2004 general elections. He joined the Democratic Alliance as a parliamentary economics researcher, and has been responsible for developing the party's economic policies.

In 2005, he was appointed as Chief of Staff for then-party leader, Tony Leon. Upon returning to politics in 2009, he was appointed campaign events manager for the Democratic Alliance's 2009 election campaign, and was subsequently elected to the National Council of Provinces for the Western Cape.

In the National Council of Provinces, Harris sat on the Select Committee on Finance, and held the positions of Party Whip and Provincial Whip.

He served on the Portfolio Committee on Trade and Industry. From 2011 until 2012, he warned about a technological crisis at the Companies and Intellectual Property Commission (CIPC), noting that the commission had "capacity and managed problems" which had resulted in a backlog and slow processing of registrations.

He subsequently moved to the Standing Committee on Finance, and became the Parliamentary counsellor to then-parliamentary leader Lindiwe Mazibuko.

Harris did not stand for re-election in the 2014 parliamentary elections. He instead became the Director of Trade and Investment in the Office of the Executive Mayor at the City of Cape Town until March 2015, then assuming the role of Chief Executive Officer at Wesgro, the official Investment and Trade promotion agency for the Western Cape. Union federation COSATU criticised Harris' move to Wesgro, accusing the DA of "cadre deployment", and claiming that Harris was incompetent for the position because he had demonstrated a "white brain deficit" in Parliament.

He is also the vice president for Africa on the bureau of Liberal International, the global group of liberal parties, and sits on the board of SiliconCape, Cape Town's technology industry promotion body.

== Positions ==
Harris sees economic growth as paramount to solving South Africa's problems. He is in favour of tax breaks for small businesses, and a youth wage subsidy to encourage companies to hire young people. When Pravin Gordhan was Minister of Finance, Harris praised him for his conservative budget, but criticised South Africa's poor economic growth, which he believed Gordhan had failed to address.

Harris has criticised the African National Congress for benchmarking post-Apartheid South Africa against the low bar of Apartheid South Africa, instead of striving for even better.

Harris has praised Tony Leon for boosting South Africa's trade to Argentina during his tenure as ambassador to that country.
