= Phylia Nwamitwa II =

South African leader of the Valoyi area (1939/1940–2026)

Hosi Phylia Tinyiko Lwandlamuni Nwamitwa II (1939 or 1940 – 9 February 2026), also known as Tinyiko Nwamitwa-Shilubana, was a South African traditional ruler who was the traditional leader of the Valoyi area in Limpopo.

== Chieftaincy ==
She was appointed the chief of the area in 2002, after series of disagreements with her cousin on her succession to the throne due to her female gender. The disagreements began after her father, Hosi Fofoza Nwamitwa, died in 1968 without a male heir. Due to the law which restricted the seat to male primogeniture at the time, her uncle, Richard succeeded the throne as regent. Hosi Richard died in 2001, when the 1994 South African Constitution, which guarantees equal rights for both genders was in force. As the rightful heir, Phylia Nwamitwa sought to reclaim her right to the throne. She was sent to court by her displeased cousin Sidwell Nwamitwa, son of Hosi Richard, who argued that the royal authorities had no right to alter the tradition of the Valoyi people. She was installed as the traditional ruler after winning the case. According to the ruling of the Constitutional court, the 1994 South African Constitution guarantees the dignity and status of women as citizens of no less value to male citizens. She is the first female traditional ruler of the Vatsonga people, and the first woman in the nation's history to be appointed Hosi.

== Early life ==
Phylia Nwamitwa was the first and only child of former Hosi, Fofoza Nwamitwa, and his principal wife, Nkosikazi Favazi Nwamanave. She was married to Thompson Shilubane, a member of the Nkuna/Shilubane royal family, who died in 1979. They had four children.

== Education and career ==
Phylia Nwamitwa II started her primary education at age 7, at a time when girls were not allowed to receive a formal education. On completing her secondary education in 1959, she enrolled in Lemana Training College to train as a teacher. Whilst working as a teacher, she obtained a Bachelor of Arts degree in Anthropology at the University of South Africa. Additionally, Phylia Nwamitwa had an honorary doctorate degree in Law from the same university.

She worked as an Inspector of Education from 1989 to 1994. In the 1990s, she became active in politics and was appointed a member of Parliament on the ticket of the African National Congress (ANC) from 1994 to 2009. She was the Deputy chair of Huvu ya Valoyinkulu, chairperson of Mopani House of Traditional Leaders, as well as an executive member of the Limpopo House of Traditional leaders.

== Advocacy ==
Phylia Nwamitwa was involved with Non-Governmental Organisations working towards women empowerment in South Africa. She prioritised development of her rural area, where joblessness and HIV-Aids rates are high.

She is one of the several women traditional leaders whose leadership is being studied under a University of Ghana project titled "Women and Political Participation in Africa: A Comparative Study of Representations and Roles of Female Chiefs", which is funded by the Andrew W. Mellon Foundation. In this project, a mixed-methods approach is adopted to comparatively study women's representation in the institution of chieftaincy and their influence on women's rights and wellbeing in Botswana, Ghana, Liberia, and South Africa. Lead researchers on the project, Peace A. Medie, Adriana A. E Biney, Amanda Coffie and Cori Wielenga, have also published an opinion piece titled "Women traditional leaders could help make sure the pandemic message is heard" in The Conversation news, which discusses how women traditional leaders can educate their subjects on COVID-19.

Phylia Nwamitwa II died on 9 February 2026, at the age of 86.
