= Daryl Swanepoel =

South African politician (born 1962)

Member of the National Assembly
- In office 16 October 2013 – May 2014
- In office 1997 – June 1999

Personal details
- Born: 16 June 1962 (age 63)
- Citizenship: South Africa
- Party: African National Congress
- Other political affiliations: New National Party; National Party

Daryl Wade Swanepoel (born 16 June 1962) is a South African politician and political strategist who is currently the chief executive officer of the Inclusive Society Institute. He represented the ANC in the National Assembly from 2013 to 2014.

Before joining the ANC, Swanepoel was a member of the National Party (NP) and New National Party (NNP). He represented the NP in the Gauteng Provincial Legislature and National Assembly between 1994 and 1999, and he was the NNP's last secretary-general, holding the office from 2002 until the party's demise in 2005.

== Early life and career ==
Swanepoel was born on 16 June 1962. He entered politics around the time of the 1987 general election, when he was involved in the NP's successful campaign to win the Progressive Federal Party-controlled Hillbrow constituency in Johannesburg.

== Post-apartheid political career ==
=== National Party ===
After the end of apartheid, Swanepoel represented the NP in the first session of the Gauteng Provincial Legislature. In July 1997, he succeeded Olaus van Zyl as leader of the party's caucus in the legislature. However, in late 1997, Swanepoel left the provincial legislature to fill a casual vacancy in the NP's caucus in the National Assembly, the lower house of the South African Parliament. He also served as chief spokesman for the NP and as a senior aide to Marthinus van Schalkwyk, the national leader of the NP (which in late 1997 was restyled as the NNP).

Swanepoel stood for re-election to the National Assembly in the 1999 general election, ranked seventh on the ANC's regional party list for Gauteng. However, due to the NNP's poor electoral performance, he did not secure re-election to his seat. In the next general election in 2004, he again stood for election and was again thwarted by the NNP's electoral performance.

Nonetheless, Swanepoel remained a senior figure in the NNP. In 1999 and 2000, as the party negotiated with the Democratic Party (DP) to form the multi-party Democratic Alliance (DA), Swanepoel continued to serve as an aide to van Schalkwyk and deputised Renier Schoeman as the NNP's deputy executive director. The NNP's participation in the DA was short-lived, and DA leader Tony Leon sued Swanepoel and Schoeman for publishing an NNP statement which referred to him as a "political swindler"; they retracted and apologised for the statement in April 2003.

In November 2002, Swanepoel was elected to succeed Schoeman as national secretary-general of the NNP after Schoeman was appointed Deputy Minister of Health. He remained in that office until the party's demise, which he announced in March 2005; confirming that the NNP intended officially to disband, Swanepoel told the press that it was "crucial for black, white, coloured and Indian [people] to join forces within the ranks of the ANC", the governing party.

=== African National Congress ===
After the NP was dissolved, Swanepoel joined the ANC, and formed the Progressive Business Forum. His former colleague Renier Schoeman later co-convened the Forum, the ANC's new corporate outreach programme. In 2012, analyst Susan Booysen described Schoeman and Swanepoel as "die-hard Nats [NP supporters]... that eventually joined the ANC not out of principle but out of desperation for a little place in the ambit of political power".

On 16 October 2013, Swanepoel returned to the National Assembly for another brief stint, on this occasion as a representative of the ANC; he filled the casual vacancy created by Sue van der Merwe's resignation and departed after the 2014 general election. In later years, he continued as co-convenor of the Progressive Business Forum and worked at the ANC's headquarters at Luthuli House. As of 2019, he was the chief executive officer of the Inclusive Society Institute, a think tank based in Cape Town.
