= Tovhowani Tshivhase =

South African politician (born 1946)

Member of the National Assembly
- In office 9 May 1994 – 1 January 2011

Personal details
- Born: 10 September 1946 (age 79)
- Citizenship: South Africa
- Party: African National Congress

Tovhowani Josephine Tshivhase (born 10 September 1946) is a South African politician who represented the African National Congress (ANC) in the National Assembly from May 1994 until January 2011, when she resigned. She is a former chairperson of the assembly's Portfolio Committee on Social Development.

== Early life ==
Tshivhase was born on 10 September 1946 and speaks TshiVenda.

== National Assembly ==
She was first elected to the National Assembly in the 1994 general election, South Africa's first under universal suffrage. She gained re-election in 1999 (on that occasion representing the Limpopo constituency), 2004, and 2009. After the 2004 election, the ANC nominated her to replace Cas Saloojee as chair of the social development committee. She resigned during her fourth term in the assembly, with effect from 1 January 2011.
