= Newlands East =

- Location within KwaZulu-Natal Location within South Africa
- Coordinates: 29°46′S 30°59′E
- Country: South Africa
- Province: KwaZulu-Natal
- Municipality: eThekwini

Area
  - Total: 14.81 km^{2} (5.72 sq mi)

Population (2011)
  - Total: 52,566
  - Density: 3,549/km^{2} (9,193/sq mi)

Racial makeup (2011)
  - Black African: 69.3%
  - Coloureds: 24.2%
  - Indian/Asian: 5.8%
  - White: 0.2%
  - Other: 0.5%

First languages (2011)
  - Zulu: 58.1%
  - English: 32.5%
  - Xhosa: 3.5%
  - S. Ndebele: 1.2%
  - Other: 4.7%
- Time zone: UTC+2 (SAST)
- Postal code (street): 4037
- PO box: 4161
- Area code: 031

Newlands East is a township located 17 kilometres (11 mi) north-west of the Durban CBD in the province of KwaZulu-Natal, South Africa.

== Geography ==
Newlands East is bordered by Newlands West to the west and south, Durban North to the east and KwaMashu to the north

The main access roads in and around Newlands East is the N2 highway, M45 Queen Nandi Drive, M5 Dumisani Makhaye Drive and M21 Inanda Road. The M45 Queen Nandi Drive is the main thoroughfare to Newlands East and connects to KwaMashu and Briardene. It also provides access to the N2 highway which connects Newlands East with KwaDukuza and Port Shepstone.

Newlands East comprises the suburbs of Avoca Hills, Esibubulungu, Hippo Road, Melkhoute, New Dawn Park and Riverhorse Valley.

=== Riverhorse Valley ===
Riverhorse Valley is a 150ha light industrial, manufacturing and commercial estate located on both sides of the N2 highway. The estate which began construction in late 2004 was previously mostly sugarcane land owned by Tongaat Hulett.

Today it includes the Ethekwini Hospital & Heart Centre, the only Total Petroport in eThekwini and several warehousing and distribution centres.
