= Paul Ditshetelo =

South African politician (1936–2011)

Member of the National Assembly
- In office June 1999 – May 2009

Personal details
- Born: 16 October 1936
- Died: 11 October 2011 (aged 74) Johannesburg, South Africa
- Citizenship: South Africa
- Party: United Christian Democratic Party
- Spouse: Celia Ditshetelo

Kgomotso Paul Harry Ditshetelo (16 October 1936 – 11 October 2011) was a South African politician who represented the United Christian Democratic Party (UCDP) in the National Assembly from 1999 to 2009. He was also the deputy president of the UCDP from 1998 to 2011. During apartheid, he was a politician and civil servant in Bophuthatswana.

== Political career ==
Ditshetelo was born on 16 October 1936 in the region that later became the North West province. In 1972, he was a founding member of Lucas Mangope's Tswana National Party, and he also worked in Mangope's government in the Bophuthatswana homeland, serving as a secretary in Bophuthatswana's "embassy" in Pretoria from 1978 to 1988. In 1989, he was appointed as a governor in the homeland government, stationed at Kudumane.

== Post-apartheid political career ==
When the Tswana National Party (since renamed the Christian Democratic Party) was restyled as the UCDP in 1994, Ditshetelo became its inaugural secretary-general. He subsequently deputised Mangope as the UCDP's deputy president from 1998 until January 2011, when he stepped down due to ill health.

At the same time, from 1999 to 2009, Ditshetelo represented the UCDP in the National Assembly, the lower house of the post-apartheid South African Parliament; he was elected in 1999 and re-elected in 2004. He was elected to a third term in 2009 but declined to be sworn into the seat.

== Personal life and death ==
He was married to politician Celia Ditshetelo, with whom he had three children and several grandchildren. He died on 11 October 2011 in a hospital in Johannesburg after a lengthy illness.
