= Doris Ngcengwane =

South African politician (born 1947)

Member of the National Assembly
- In office 29 June 2009 – 6 May 2014
- In office June 1999 – May 2009
- Constituency: Gauteng

Personal details
- Born: 13 July 1947 (age 78)
- Citizenship: South Africa
- Party: African National Congress

Nompendlko Doris Ngcengwane (born 13 July 1947) is a South African politician who represented the African National Congress (ANC) in the National Assembly from 1999 to 2014, excepting a brief hiatus in mid-2009. She served two consecutive terms from 1999 to 2009, gaining election in 1999 and 2004, and representing the Gauteng constituency. She was not immediately re-elected in the 2009 general election but instead was returned to the assembly shortly after the start of the legislative term, on 29 June 2009, when a casual vacancy arose due to the resignation of Lindiwe Sisulu.
