= Pat Lebenya-Ntanzi =

South African politician

Member of the National Assembly
- In office 1 April 2007 – 1 May 2012

Personal details
- Born: 1976 or 1977 (age 48–49) Matatiele, Cape Province; South Africa
- Party: African National Congress (since 2012); Inkatha Freedom Party (until 2012)

Seeng Patricia Lebenya-Ntanzi (born 1976 or 1977) is a South African politician who represented the Inkatha Freedom Party (IFP) in the National Assembly from 2007 to 2012. She was also the leader of the IFP Youth Brigade. She resigned from the National Assembly in May 2012 and subsequently announced that she had joined the African National Congress (ANC).

== Early life ==
Lebenya-Ntanzi was born in 1976 or 1977 in Matatiele in the former Cape Province, where she was raised by a Xhosa mother and a Sotho father.

== Political career ==
She entered national political prominence in 2006, when she became the leader of the IFP Youth Brigade. The following year, on 1 April 2007, she was sworn in to an IFP seat in the National Assembly, filling a casual vacancy. She was re-elected to a full legislative term in the 2009 general election.

Though Lebenya-Ntanzi was the IFP's youngest representative in Parliament, her tenure caused tensions within the IFP Youth Brigade, as some camps alleged that her priority was "to appease the elders in the party". She resigned from her legislative seat midway through the term, with effect from 1 May 2012, and was replaced by Liezl van der Merwe. The Witness said that Lebenya-Ntanzi had been forced to resign by her party after "a reported fallout" with Mangosuthu Buthelezi, the IFP's leader. However, Buthelezi later disputed that there had been "some kind of confrontation":

That is pure nonsense. Mrs Lebenya represented the IFP in Parliament as the acting leader of the IFP Youth Brigade. However, she said she was studying towards a degree and thus had little time for her parliamentary work or party work. When a new Youth Brigade leader was elected, she was naturally withdrawn from Parliament. Taking umbrage, she resigned.

Shortly after her resignation from Parliament, in July 2012, Lebenya-Ntanzi joined the IFP's rival, the governing ANC. Her defection was announced publicly the following year in the run-up to the 2014 general election.

== Personal life ==
As of 2010 she was married with two children.
