= Tshiwela Lishivha =

South African politician (born 1958)

Member of the National Assembly
- In office June 1999 – 6 May 2014

Personal details
- Born: 28 June 1958 (age 67)
- Citizenship: South Africa
- Party: African National Congress

Tshiwela Elidah Lishivha (born 28 June 1958), also known as Elda Leshika, is a South African politician who represented the African National Congress (ANC) in the National Assembly from 1999 to 2014. She was first elected in the 1999 general election, serving the Limpopo constituency (then called the Northern Province). She was narrowly re-elected to the Limpopo caucus in 2004, and she was re-elected in 2009 off the ANC's national party list. During her third term in the assembly, she was a member of the Portfolio Committee on Sport and Recreation.
