= Ali Maziya =

South African politician and activist (1950–2018)

Member of the National Assembly
- In office 27 November 2009 – 6 May 2014
- In office June 1999 – 1 December 2007

Personal details
- Born: Alpheus Mokabhe Maziya; 15 October 1950 Madubula, Transvaal; Union of South Africa
- Died: 9 October 2018 (aged 67)
- Party: African National Congress
- Other political affiliations: South African National Civics Organisation
- Spouse: Lindiwe Maziya (died 1990)

Alpheus Mokabhe "Ali" Maziya (15 October 1950 – 9 October 2018) was a South African politician and activist from Gauteng. He represented the African National Congress (ANC) in the National Assembly from 1999 to 2007 and later from 2009 to 2014. He was also the party's defence whip from 2010 to 2014.

During the final years of apartheid, Maziya was a prominent figure in the ANC and South African National Civics Organisation (Sanco) in the Southern Transvaal. His wife and infant child were murdered in political violence in Vosloorus, Transvaal in 1990.

== Early life and activism ==
Maziya was born on 15 October 1950 in Madubula (present-day Mohlakeng) on the West Rand of the former Transvaal. He later moved to Vosloorus, where he was a union shop steward at his workplace. By 1990, he was a member of the anti-apartheid ANC and a member of the executive of SANCO, as well as chairperson of the Vosloorus Crisis Committee, a SANCO affiliate aligned to the ANC.

=== June 1990 attack ===
In the early morning of 1 June 1990, unidentified men launched a series of attacks on VCC members in Vosloorus. They attacked Maziya's home, lobbing a hand grenade into his bedroom and opening fire on the occupants with AK-47s. Maziya was wounded but survived, having slept on a spare bed so that his visiting parents could share his bedroom with his wife, Lindi, and their infant son, Zwelakhe. Lindi was killed at the scene and Maziya's mother and son died in hospital. Maziya believed that supporters of the Pan Africanist Congress, a rival to the ANC, were responsible for the attack.

Maziya lost his job at the end of June 1990 and was unemployed in 1992, when he was elected to a full-time position as an organiser for Sanco in the Southern Transvaal.

== Legislative career ==
In the 1999 general election, Maziya was elected as a member of the ANC's Gauteng caucus in the National Assembly, the lower house of the South African Parliament. He was re-elected in 2004, off the ANC's national party list, but resigned on 1 December 2007.

He returned for a further partial term on 27 November 2009, when the ANC nominated him to fill the casual vacancy arising from Pallo Jordan's resignation. After his return, in January 2010, the ANC appointed him as the party's whip in the Joint Standing Committee on Defence and Portfolio Committee on Defence and Military Veterans. He continued as whip until the 2014 general election, when he did not stand for re-election.

== Death ==
Maziya died on 9 October 2018.
