= Secretariat of the Pan-African Parliament =

The Secretariat of the Pan-African Parliament provides administrative support to the Pan-African Parliament.

== Composition ==
The secretariat is composed of a clerk and two deputy clerks. One deputy clerk is in charge of "Finance, Administration and Human Resources" and the other is responsible for "Legislative Business and Conferences".

As head of the secretariat, the clerk supervises it staff, organises elections of presidents and vice presidents, takes minutes of proceedings of parliament and permanent committees and authenticates votes of each sitting by signature. The clerk is responsible to parliament for accounting issues and manages its daily administration.

As of January 2024, the members of the secretariat are:

Position	Name	Notes
Clerk	Lindiwe Khumalo	
Deputy Clerk in charge of Legislative Business and Conferences	Gali Massa Harou	
Deputy Clerk in charge of Finance, Administration and Human Resources	Kenneth Akibate	Acting
