= Celia Ditshetelo =

South African politician

Ipuseng Celia Ditshetelo was a member of the National Assembly of South Africa. She is a member of the United Christian Democratic Party. She was married to fellow parliamentarian Paul Ditshetelo.
