= Priscilla Sekgobela =

South African politician

Member of the National Assembly
- In office 20 January 2014 – 6 May 2014
- In office 9 May 2004 – May 2009
- Constituency: Mpumalanga

Personal details
- Born: 11 May 1957 (age 68)
- Citizenship: South Africa
- Party: African National Congress

Priscilla Sindisiwe Sekgobela (born 11 May 1957) is a South African politician who represented the African National Congress (ANC) in the National Assembly from 1994 to 2009, serving the Mpumalanga constituency. She returned for a brief second term from January to May 2014.

== Legislative career ==
Sekgobela was born on 11 May 1957. She was first elected to the National Assembly in the 1994 general election, South Africa's first under universal suffrage, and she gained re-election in 1999 and 2004. She represented the Mpumalanga constituency. She also served as a party whip until August 2007, when the ANC announced that it would demote her; she had been implicated in the so-called Travelgate scandal, which concerned the abuse of parliamentary travel vouchers, and had signed an acknowledgement of debt to Parliament, although she was cleared on a related criminal fraud charge.

Sekgobela was not initially re-elected in the 2009 general election, but she returned to her seat on 20 January 2014, filling the casual vacancy that arose in the ANC's national caucus after Crosby Moni died. She left Parliament again after the general election in May 2014.
