= Joseph Selau =

South African politician

Member of the National Assembly
- In office 1 June 2007 – 6 May 2014
- Constituency: North West

Personal details
- Citizenship: South Africa
- Party: African National Congress

Gaolaolwe Joseph Selau is a South African politician who represented the African National Congress (ANC) in the National Assembly from 2007 to 2014. He was sworn in on 1 June 2007 to fill a casual vacancy arising from China Dodovu's resignation, and he was re-elected in the 2009 general election. He served the North West constituency.
