= Sizani Dlamini-Dubazana =

South African politician

Member of the National Assembly of South Africa
- In office 6 May 2009 – 7 May 2019
- Constituency: KwaZulu-Natal

Personal details
- Party: ANC
- Education: University of South Africa
- Profession: Politician, nurse, lecturer

Zephroma Sizani Dlamini-Dubazana is a South African politician and African National Congress member who served as a Member of the National Assembly of South Africa from 2009 to 2019. Dlamini-Dubazana is known for being a supporter of the former ANC president and President of South Africa, Jacob Zuma.

== Early life and education ==
Dlamini-Dubazana is from the Nkumba village in Bulwer. She graduated from the University of South Africa with a Bachelor of Arts in Nursing Science (B Cur) in 1984 and worked as a nursing lecturer between 1990 and 1994.

== Political career ==
Dlamini-Dubazana served in the underground structures of the African National Congress when the party was banned and was a member of the United Democratic Front between 1982 and 1989. She was a member of the KwaZulu-Natal ANC Provincial Executive Committee as well as the Provincial Working Committee and chaired the Economic Transformation PEC sub-committee.

== Parliamentary career ==
Dlamini-Dubazana topped the ANC KwaZulu-Natal province-to-national list in the 2009 general election and was thus elected to a seat in the National Assembly of South Africa. During her first term in the National Assembly, she was chief whip of the Standing Committee on Auditor-General. She was re-elected to her seat in Parliament in the 2014 general election, ranked 8th on the ANC province-to-national list. After her re-election, she was assigned to serve on the Committee On Auditor-General and the Portfolio Committee on Public Service and Administration, Performance Monitoring & Evaluation.

In 2015, Dlamini-Dubazana and multiple other ANC MPs voted for a report by the Minister of Police Nathi Nhleko that absolved president Jacob Zuma of paying any money towards the controversial multimillion-rand upgrades at the Nkandla homestead, his private home in KwaZulu-Natal.

In August 2017, Dlamini-Dubazana and four other ANC MPs boycotted a meeting of the Portfolio Committee on Public Service and Administration, Performance Monitoring & Evaluation which was chaired by outspoken Zuma critic Dr Makhosi Khoza. ANC chief whip and Chief Whip of the Majority Party Jackson Mthembu condemned their actions.

Dlamini-Dubazana was not placed on any ANC candidate list for the 2019 South African general election and left parliament at the election as a result.

== 2022 ANC presidential campaign ==
In May 2022, it was reported that party members in KwaZulu-Natal had begun lobbying for the nomination of Dlamini-Dubazana as a presidential candidate ahead of the ANC's 55th National Conference in December 2022. Dlamini-Dubazana campaigned on appointing youthful ANC members as deputy ministers, opposing the ANC's current cadre deployment policy, and empowering women. However, her presidential campaign fell short of the necessary amount of branch nominations she had to receive to be included on the ANC Electoral Committee's consolidated list of candidates nominated for the "Top Six" leadership positions, including the position of party president, in November 2022 ahead of the national conference.
