= Alina Rantsolase =

South African trade unionist (1954–2010)

Member of the National Assembly
- In office May 2009 – November 2010

Personal details
- Born: 15 March 1954 Orange Free State; Union of South Africa
- Died: November 2010 (aged 56) Vereeniging, Gauteng; Republic of South Africa
- Party: African National Congress
- Other political affiliations: Congress of South African Trade Unions

Alina Machejane Rantsolase (15 March 1954 – November 2010) was a South African politician and trade unionist who served as the treasurer of the Congress of South African Trade Unions (COSATU) from 1999 to 2009. She left her union office in 2009 to represent the African National Congress (ANC) in the National Assembly, where she chaired the ANC's caucus until her death in November 2010.

Rantsolase rose through the ranks of the union movement after joining the Commercial Catering and Allied Workers' Union (CCAWUSA, later SACCAWU) in 1978. She unionised her workplace, a Checkers branch in Vereeniging, Transvaal, and subsequently served as CCAWUSA's national treasurer from 1999 until 2009, when she was elected to hold the same office in COSATU.

== Early life and union activism ==
Rantsolase was born on 15 March 1954 in a rural area of the former Orange Free State. Her mother was a farmworker and Rantsolase's education was frequently disrupted during the political turmoil of the apartheid era; she herself became involved in anti-apartheid activism while at school. After leaving school without matriculating, she took up work at Checkers in Arcon Park in Vereeniging, part of the Vaal triangle in the former Transvaal. In 1978, she was recruited into the Orange Vaal branch of the Commercial Catering and Allied Workers' Union (CCAWUSA).

For some time thereafter, Rantsolase was the only union member at her workplace. She became an informal and then formal shop steward and represented the workers in negotiations with Checkers about union recognition, from 1983, and then in wage bargaining, from 1985; from 1984, she was a national negotiator in high-level talks between Checkers and CCAWUSA. She was elected as CCAWUSA's regional treasurer in 1987 and then regional chair in 1993 – though by then the union had been expanded as the South African Commercial, Catering and Allied Workers' Union (SACCAWU). Later in 1993, she was elected as SACCAWU's national treasurer, and she served in that position until 1999.

== COSATU: 1999–2009 ==
CCAWUSA was a founding affiliate of the Congress of South African Trade Unions (COSATU), South Africa's largest trade union federation, and Rantsolase had been active in the regional leadership of COSATU since the 1980s. In September 1999, she was elected as COSATU national treasurer, becoming the first woman to hold the position. She was re-elected at the next COSATU congress in 2003 and ultimately remained in the office until 2009. She had self-taught accounting skills and was known for her strict fiscal discipline.

Simultaneously, Rantsolase served in various labour advisory bodies, including the International Labour Organisation committee on labour standards and the African Union's Labour and Social Commission. She was also a member of the African National Congress (ANC) and served as the chair of the disciplinary committee in the party's regional branch in Vaal. In 2007, ahead of the ANC's 52nd National Conference, she was one of several unionists whom COSATU put forward as a possible candidate for election to the ANC's National Executive Committee.

== Parliament: 2009–2010 ==
In the 2009 general election, Rantsolase was elected to represent the ANC in the National Assembly, the lower house of the South African Parliament. She was one of a handful of COSATU leaders included in the ANC caucus for the explicit purpose of strengthening the union's representation in the framework of the Tripartite Alliance. According to the Sunday Times, she was reluctant to take up the seat. She stepped down as COSATU treasurer in order to fulfil her parliamentary duties and, at COSATU's national congress in September 2009, she was succeeded by Freda Oosthuysen.

After the election, she was appointed as the chairperson of the ANC's caucus in the National Assembly and also served as the party's whip in the Portfolio Committee on Labour. In her capacity as chairperson, her attention to parliamentary rules and reluctance to abide by "ANC hierarchy" reportedly led to tensions with Mathole Motshekga, the ANC's chief whip.

In 2010, Rantsolase emerged as a possible candidate to stand for election as provincial treasurer of the ANC's provincial branch in Gauteng. When the party's provincial conference was held in May that year, she lost the election to Ntombi Mekgwe, who stood on the slate of the winning candidate for provincial chairperson, Paul Mashatile.

== Personal life and death ==
Rantsolase had one daughter, who is a chartered accountant. She died in November 2010 in Vereeniging after a period of illness.
