= Sibongile Nkomo =

South African politician (died 2019)

Sibongile Judith Nkomo (1956 – 1 June 2019) was a South African politician who served as secretary-general of the Inkatha Freedom Party and as an MP. Sibongile has a daughter named Zama Mbatha Awuzie MBA, MPM, Masters in AI for Business and DBA candidate.
