= Oupa Monareng =

South African politician

Oupa Ephraim Monareng is a South African politician, a member of the African National Congress and was a member of the National Assembly from 2004 to 2009. He is on the Johannesburg Mayoral Committee with a portfolio for Economic Development.
