= Loretta Jacobus =

South African politician

Member of the National Assembly
- In office 23 April 2004 – 1 August 2013
- Constituency: Gauteng

Deputy Minister of Correctional Services
- In office 2 February 2006 – 10 May 2009
- President: Kgalema Motlanthe; Jacob Zuma
- Minister: Ngconde Balfour
- Preceded by: Cheryl Gillwald
- Succeeded by: Hlengiwe Mkhize

Delegate to the National Council of Provinces

Assembly Member for Gauteng
- In office June 1999 – April 2004

Personal details
- Born: 6 April 1962 (age 64) Port Elizabeth; Cape Province, South Africa
- Party: African National Congress
- Other party: South African Communist Party

Loretta Jacobus (born 6 April 1962), formerly known as Loretta Bastardo-Ibanez, is a South African politician who served as Deputy Minister of Correctional Services from February 2006 to May 2009. She represented the African National Congress (ANC) in the National Assembly from 2004 to 2013.

Before joining the National Assembly, Jacobus served in the National Council of Provinces from 1999 to 2004 and in the Gauteng Provincial Legislature from 1994 to 1999. She was active in the anti-apartheid struggle and represented the South African Communist Party (SACP) during the multi-party constitutional negotiations of 1993.

== Early life and career ==
Jacobus was born on 6 April 1962 in Port Elizabeth in the former Cape Province. She studied social work at the University of the Western Cape and in the 1980s was a teacher and social worker in the Transvaal, where she was also active in anti-apartheid organising through affiliates of the United Democratic Front, notably the South African Youth Congress and the Federation of Transvaal Women.

When the ANC and SACP were unbanned by the apartheid government in 1990, Jacobus was elected as the inaugural chairperson of the SACP's new Johannesburg West branch. She later served as provincial treasurer of the SACP in Gauteng from 1991 to 1994. At the same time, from 1991 to 1993, she worked for the staff development unit of the National Union of Metalworkers and served in the Tripartite Alliance's controversial Macroeconomic Research Group. From 1993, she represented the SACP at the Multi-Party Negotiating Forum which drafted South Africa's transitional Constitution.

== Legislative career: 1994–2013 ==
In South Africa's first post-apartheid elections in 1994, Jacobus was elected to represent the ANC in the Gauteng Provincial Legislature. In the next general election in 1999, she was elected to represent Gauteng in the National Council of Provinces, the upper house of the new South African Parliament, where she chaired the Select Committee on Social Services.

In the 2004 general election, Jacobus was elected to the National Assembly, representing the ANC in the Gauteng constituency. She chaired the Portfolio Committee on Arts and Culture. Less than two years into the legislative term, in February 2006, President Thabo Mbeki appointed her as Deputy Minister of Correctional Services after the incumbent, Cheryl Gillwald, resigned. She deputised Minister Ngconde Balfour.

On 23 September 2008, both Jacobus and Balfour were among the several ministers and deputy ministers who resigned from office after the ANC compelled Mbeki to resign from the presidency. However, soon afterwards, the party clarified that several of those who had resigned were still willing to serve under Mbeki's successor, and Jacobus was indeed reappointed to her position by President Kgalema Motlanthe when he took office later that week.

In the 2009 general election, she was re-elected to her legislative seat but Motlanthe's successor, President Jacob Zuma, appointed Hlengiwe Mkhize to replace her as Deputy Minister. She remained an ordinary Member of Parliament until 1 August 2013, when she resigned.

== Personal life ==
Jacobus was formerly married to Antonio Bastardo-Ibanez; they divorced in 1997.
