= Musa Zondi =

South African politician (born 1960)

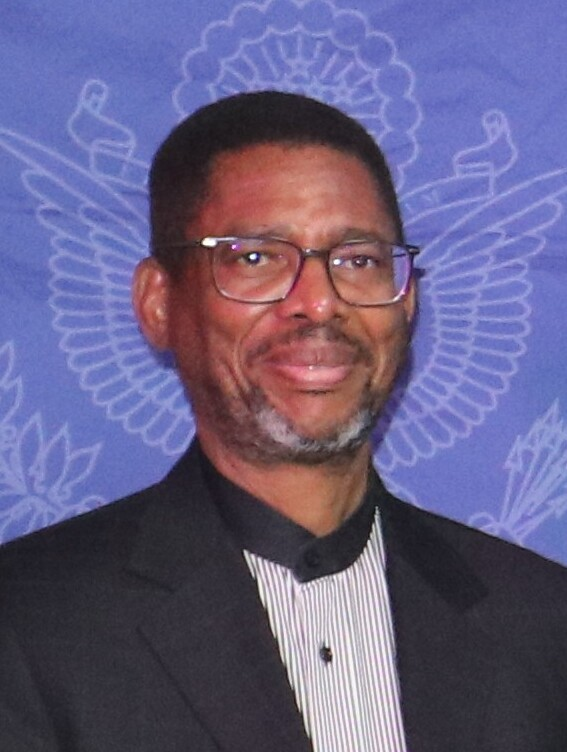

Member of the KwaZulu-Natal Executive Council for Economic Development, Tourism and Environmental Affairs
- Incumbent
- Assumed office 18 June 2024
- Premier: Thami Ntuli
- Preceded by: Siboniso Duma

Member of the KwaZulu-Natal Legislature
- Incumbent
- Assumed office 31 October 2023

Member of the National Assembly
- In office June 1999 – 1 February 2012

Delegate to the National Council of Provinces

Assembly Member for KwaZulu-Natal
- In office May 1994 – June 1999

Personal details
- Born: Keith Muntuwenkosi Zondi; 19 February 1960 (age 66) Nkandla, Natal Province; Union of South Africa
- Party: Inkatha Freedom Party

Keith Muntuwenkosi "Musa" Zondi (born 19 February 1960) is a South African politician who has been KwaZulu-Natal's Member of the Executive Council for Economic Development, Tourism and Environmental Affairs since 2024. A member of the Inkatha Freedom Party, he was sworn in as a member of the KwaZulu-Natal Legislature in October 2023. Previously, he served as Deputy Minister of Public Works from 2001 to 2004. He represented KwaZulu-Natal in the National Council of Provinces from 1994 to 1999 and in the National Assembly from 1999 to 2012. He served as the party's secretary-general and was widely touted as a possible successor to IFP president Mangosuthu Buthelezi before he resigned from his party office and legislative seat in February 2012.

== Early life and career ==
Zondi was born on 19 February 1960 in Nkandla in the former Natal province. He joined the Inkatha Youth Brigade in 1976 and also served as vice-chairman of the Students Christian Movement at Dlangezwa High School. His attempt to complete a bachelor's degree at the University of Fort Hare was disturbed by student boycotts, and the apartheid government denied him permission to study at Wits University, a campus designated for whites.

Instead, Zondi worked until 1984 in the government of the KwaZulu bantustan. He worked at Khulani Holdings, a private company, from 1984 to 1987, when he left to help establish the non-profit Foundation for Leadership Development. He was also elected national chairman of the Inkatha Youth Brigade in 1984.

== Political career ==
In South Africa's first post-apartheid elections in 1994, Zondi was elected to represent Inkatha (by then restyled as the IFP) in the KwaZulu-Natal caucus of the Senate (later the National Council of Provinces). In the next general election in 1999, he was elected to the National Assembly on the party list for the KwaZulu-Natal constituency. He also served as the IFP's national spokesperson. In January 2001, President Thabo Mbeki appointed him to deputise Minister Stella Sigcau as Deputy Minister of Public Works; he replaced Buyisiwe Nzimande.

Following Zondi's re-election in 2004, President Mbeki invited him to stay on as Deputy Minister, but Zondi and Vincent Ngema, who had also been offered a deputy ministerial position, said that they could not accept the offer until Mbeki's party, the African National Congress, had reached a comprehensive agreement with the IFP about the nature of their partnership. After receiving this response, Mbeki said that he would simply appoint two other deputy ministers who were willing to accept the job immediately. Zondi continued as an ordinary Member of Parliament and was re-elected to his seat in 2009.

Simultaneously, he served as secretary-general of the party and was considered a frontrunner to succeed Mangosuthu Buthelezi as IFP president; while the party's dissident factions generally preferred Zanele Magwaza-Msibi, Zondi had the support of some of the conservative core that had formerly supported Buthelezi. However, Buthelezi proved reluctant to retire, and the party's leadership elections were delayed indefinitely. In December 2011, Zondi announced that he would not stand for re-election as secretary-general and would instead seek to spend more time with his family. His announcement followed rumours that he was having an affair with a married IFP colleague; he said that his IFP rivals had been conducting a smear campaign against him and had even plotted to kill him to remove him from the succession race.

In February 2012, Zondi announced his immediate retirement from frontline politics, resigning from the IFP secretary-general's office and from his legislative seat.

In October 2023, Zondi returned to active politics as he was sworn into the KwaZulu-Natal Legislature for the IFP. Following the 2024 provincial election, Zondi was appointed Member of the Executive Council (MEC) for the Economic Development, Tourism and Environmental Affairs (Edtea) portfolio by IFP premier Thami Ntuli.

== Personal life ==
He is married to Mrs Zondi, with whom he has two children. He is a member of the Lutheran Church and chairs KwaZulu-Natal's Diakonia Council of Churches, in which capacity he has publicly spoken against xenophobia.
