= Phillip Dexter =

South African politician, activist, and entrepreneur

Phillip David Dexter (born 1 December 1962) is a South African politician, activist, and entrepreneur.

Dexter was a senior researcher in the Social Cohesion and Integration Research Programme of the Human Sciences Research Council (HSRC). Before joining the HSRC, he was an executive director of the National Economic Development and Labour Council (NEDLAC).

Dexter holds a Doctorate of Philosophy in Religious Studies, a BA in Philosophy and Politics, and a Master of Philosophy degree from the University of Cape Town. He entered politics as a student activist; after spending seven years in exile, he returned to South Africa in 1990. He served as general secretary of the National Education, Health and Allied Workers' Union (Nehawu) until elected to Parliament as an African National Congress (ANC) MP in 1994, where he served on the Labour, Public Service and Administration, and Finance Portfolio committees.

Dexter was a member of the National Executive of the ANC, and the Central Committee and Politburo of the South African Communist Party (SACP). He was also treasurer of the SACP. He fell out with the SACP leadership in 2007. He also acted as non-executive director for the International Marketing Council, Nehawu Investment Company, the Parliamentary Millennium Project Advisory Board, the Proudly South African campaign, South African Tourism, and the National Export Advisory Board of Trade & Investment South Africa.

Dexter has served as the spokesperson for the Congress of the People (COPE) – a political party the which was formed as a result of a split within the ANC. In 2012 he left COPE, resigned his seat in parliament and rejoined the ANC. He was replaced by Beryl Ferguson.

He has also been a director of a number of companies in the mining, energy, property and manufacturing sectors, in addition he was a trustee of a non profit organization called Indibano Foundation.

== Controversies ==
- In 2011, before he left COPE and rejoined the ANC, Dexter drafted a discussion in which he put forward his personal views on the state of the Congress of the People, claiming that:
  - party election lists were manipulated in both the 2009 and the 2011 elections
  - party funds were mismanaged and "routinely abused".
  - party mayoral candidates were inappropriate.
- Dexter opened a case of abduction against his ex-wife in 2011, for apparently leaving the country with his 5-year-old daughter.
- In 2016 Dexter was accused by a number of ANC members loyal to Marius Fransman, Western Cape ANC leader who was accused of sexual assault, of helping to set a "honeytrap" for the provincial leader. Dexter denied this accusation
- In 2016 Dexter again publicly criticized the ANC and called for, among other things, the recall of Jacob Zuma, the president of South Africa.

== Works ==
- Abdulkader Tayob; Wolfram Weisse (eds.). "Perceptions, imaginings, and practices of collective identities in the transition: National identities and ethnicity in the Western Cape". Religion and Politics in South Africa. Waxmann Verlag. ISBN 978-3-8309-5719-5.
- Chidester, David; James, Wilmot Godfrey; et al. (2003). What Holds Us Together: Social Cohesion in South Africa. HSRC Press. ISBN 978-0-7969-2030-0.

== See also ==
- Marius Redelinghuys
