= List of National Council of Provinces members of the 23rd Parliament of South Africa =

This article lists the members of the National Council of Provinces during the 23rd South African Parliament, which sat between 1999 and 2004. Members were elected after the elections of 2 June 1999, South Africa's second under universal suffrage. The governing African National Congress (ANC) performed extremely well in the provincial elections, retaining majorities in seven provincial legislatures and winning additional seats in the two others; it therefore dominated the National Council of Provinces, where 34 of the 54 permanent delegates were ANC members.

== Delegates to the National Council of Provinces ==
The following lists the permanent delegates to the National Council of Provinces as of 23 September 1999. At that time, Naledi Pandor was the Chairperson of the National Council of Provinces, with Lawrence Mushwana as her permanent deputy.

Member	Party	Province
Cornelius Neels Ackermann	NNP	Western Cape
Mohammed Bhabha	ANC	Mpumalanga
Mfuniselwa Bhengu	IFP	KwaZulu-Natal
Sandra Botha	DP	Free State
E. A. Conroy	NNP	Gauteng
Beauty Dlulane	ANC	Eastern Cape
Kent Durr	ACDP	Western Cape
Sentle Lavius Emmanuel Fenyane	ANC	Northern Province
E. C. Gouws	DP	Eastern Cape
J. Horne	NNP	Northern Cape
Loretta Jacobus	ANC	Gauteng
D. M. Kgware	ANC	Northern Cape
Gregory Krumbock	DP	Mpumalanga
Zolile Safiour Kolweni	ANC	North West
Lawrence Lever	DP	North West
Evelyn Nompumelelo Lubidla	ANC	Northern Cape
G. A. Lucas	ANC	Northern Cape
Jabu Mahlangu	ANC	Mpumalanga
Qedani Mahlangu	ANC	Gauteng
Pemmy Majodina	ANC	Eastern Cape
Masilo Isaac Makoela	ANC	Northern Province
Nono Maloyi	ANC	North West
Tony Marais	ANC	Free State
Piet Matthee	NNP	KwaZulu-Natal
Buti Joseph Mkhaliphi	ANC	Mpumalanga
Peter Moatshe	ANC	North West
Lameck Mokoena	ANC	Northern Province
Mohseen Moosa	ANC	Gauteng
Caleb Motshabi	ANC	Free State
Rita Ndzanga	ANC	Gauteng
Philippus Johannes Cornelis Nel	NNP	Free State
Constance Nkuna	ANC	Northern Province
S. N. Ntlabata	ANC	Free State
Lawrence Mushwana	ANC	Northern Province
Nosipho Ntwanambi	ANC	Western Cape
R. M. Nyakane	UDM	Northern Province
Naledi Pandor	ANC	Western Cape
P. G. Qokweni	UDM	Eastern Cape
N. M. Raju	DP	KwaZulu-Natal
Tsietsi Simon Setona	ANC	Free State
Litho Suka	ANC	Eastern Cape
Mohamed Ahmed Sulliman	ANC	Northern Cape
Enver Surty	ANC	North West
Tseko Taabe	ANC	Mpumalanga
Malesane Priscilla Themba	ANC	Mpumalanga
J. L. Theron	DP	Gauteng
Barbara Thomson	ANC	KwaZulu-Natal
J. O. Tlhagale	UCDP	North West
Adriaan Erasmus van Niekerk	NNP	Northern Cape
Antoinette Versfeld	DP	Western Cape
Jeanette Vilakazi	IFP	KwaZulu-Natal
B. Willem	ANC	Eastern Cape
Joselene Witbooi	NNP	Western Cape
Zeblon Zulu	ANC	KwaZulu-Natal
