= List of National Council of Provinces members of the 24th Parliament of South Africa =

This is a list of members of the National Council of Provinces (NCOP) during the 24th Parliament of South Africa, which was elected on 14 April 2004 and concluded its term at the 22 April 2009 general election. Each of South Africa's nine provinces sends a delegation of six permanent members to the NCOP.

== Members ==
This list provides the membership of the council as of 11 November 2008. At that time, the Chairperson of the National Council of Provinces was Mninwa Mahlangu, while Mildred Oliphant was the House Chairperson of Committees and Nosipho Ntwanambi was Chief Whip of the Council.

Name	Party	Province	Notes
Beauty Dlulane	ANC	Eastern Cape	
Wilhelm le Roux	DA	Eastern Cape	
Atwell Thembinkosi Manyosi	ANC	Eastern Cape	
Marius Robertsen	ANC	Eastern Cape	
Dickson Mkono	ANC	Eastern Cape	
Agnes Daphne Noluthando Qikani	UDM	Eastern Cape	
Nkosiwandile Shadrack Mqungquthu	ANC	Free State	Appointed on 18 February 2008 to replace Sisi Mabe.
Tutu Sanders Ralane	ANC	Free State	
Tsietsi Simon Setona	ANC	Free State	
Frederick Jacobus van Heerden	FF+	Free State	
Cornelius van Rooyen	ANC	Free State	
Darryl Arthur Worth	DA	Free State	
Su Huei Chen	DA	Gauteng	
Nomopo Maggie Madlala-Magubane	ANC	Gauteng	
Faith Mazibuko	ANC	Gauteng	Appointed on 2 December 2004 to replace Joyce Kgoali.
Abraham Mzizi	IFP	Gauteng	
Elliot Mshiyeni Sogoni	ANC	Gauteng	
Dikeledi Tsotetsi	ANC	Gauteng	Appointed on 7 October 2008 to replace Sicelo Shiceka.
Dennis Dumisane Gamede	ANC	KwaZulu-Natal	
Gregory Krumbock	DA	KwaZulu-Natal	
Abbie Mchunu	ANC	KwaZulu-Natal	Appointed on 26 November 2004 to replace N. M. Raju.
Zoliswe Chris Ntuli	ANC	KwaZulu-Natal	
Mildred Oliphant	ANC	KwaZulu-Natal	
Jeanette Vilakazi	IFP	KwaZulu-Natal	
Daniël Jacobus Botha	ANC	Limpopo	
Mninwa Mahlangu	ANC	Limpopo	
Helen Matlanyane	ANC	Limpopo	
Lameck Mokoena	ANC	Limpopo	
Joel Mbhazima Sibiya	ANC	Limpopo	Appointed on 17 August 2004 to replace Nandi Ndalane.
Odysseus Motlatjo Thetjeng	DA	Limpopo	
Buti Joseph Mkhaliphi	ANC	Mpumalanga	
Florence Nyanda	ANC	Mpumalanga	
Malesane Priscilla Themba	ANC	Mpumalanga	
Bagudi Jonathan Tolo	ANC	Mpumalanga	
Armiston Watson	DA	Mpumalanga	
Victor Vusumuzi Windvoël	ANC	Mpumalanga	
Kenewang Anastasia Kgarebe	UCDP	North West	Appointed on 1 November 2007 to replace O. J. Thlagale.
Zolile Safiour Kolweni	ANC	North West	
Joyce Mabel Masilo	ANC	North West	
Peter Moatshe	ANC	North West	
Abram Jane Letlhogile Moseki	ANC	North West	
Johanna Fredrika Terblanche	DA	North West	
Christian Motsamai Goeieman	ANC	Northern Cape	
Peggy Maud Hollander	ANC	Northern Cape	
Baitseng Lillian Ntembe	ID	Northern Cape	Appointed on 13 October 2005 to replace K. Sinclair.
Mohamed Ahmed Sulliman	ANC	Northern Cape	
Reseriti Johannes Tau	ANC	Northern Cape	
Dirk Jacobus Petrus van der Merwe	DA	Northern Cape	Appointed on 12 February 2008 to replace Leonard Harold Fielding, who replaced Shelley Joy Loe on 16 August 2005.
Freddie Adams	ANC	Western Cape	
Wesley Douglas	ACDP	Western Cape	Appointed on 11 October 2007 to replace N. D. Hendrickse, who replaced Eric Adolph on 11 October 2005.
Helen Lamoela	DA	Western Cape	
Novello John Mack	ANC	Western Cape	
Nosipho Ntwanambi	ANC	Western Cape	
Denise Robinson	DA	Western Cape	
