= List of National Council of Provinces members of the 22nd Parliament of South Africa =

This article lists the members of the Senate of South Africa during the 22nd South African Parliament, which sat between 1994 and 1999. Members were elected during the elections of 27 April 1994, South Africa's first under universal suffrage. Upon the introduction of the new Constitution of South Africa in 1997, the Senate was replaced by the National Council of Provinces.

== Members of the Senate ==
The following lists the Members of the Senate as elected in April 1994 and does not consider subsequent changes in membership.

Member	Party	Province
Cornelius Neels Ackermann	NP	Western Cape
Abraham Balie	NP	Northern Cape
Mohammed Bhabha	ANC	Eastern Transvaal
Geoffrey Bongumusa Bhengu	IFP	KwaZulu-Natal
Dennis Bloem	ANC	Orange Free State
Khuza Bogacwi	ANC	Northern Cape
Yolanda Botha	ANC	Northern Cape
Andries Abraham Bosman Bruwer	FF	North West
Lassy Chiwayo	ANC	Eastern Transvaal
Kobie Coetsee	NP	Orange Free State
Siyabonga Cwele	ANC	KwaZulu-Natal
Rosier Jacobus de Ville	FF	Eastern Transvaal
Nelson Diale	ANC	Northern Transvaal
Winkie Direko	ANC	Orange Free State
Sentle Lavius Emmanuel Fenyane	ANC	Northern Transvaal
Stanley David Fisher	NP	Western Cape
Joseph Alexander Foster	ANC	Western Cape
Thembeka Gamndana	ANC	Eastern Transvaal
Pieter Hendrik Groenewald	FF	Northern Cape
Stefan Grové	ANC	Eastern Transvaal
Allan Hendrickse	ANC	Eastern Cape
Attie Jooste	NP	Northern Cape
Joyce Kgoali	ANC	PWV
Olive Ntombikayise Khobe	ANC	North West
Gerhard Koornhof	NP	PWV
Nocwaka Lamani	ANC	Eastern Cape
Cheryl Lausberg	ANC	Orange Free State
Holomo Joseph Patrick Lebona	ANC	Orange Free State
Kimmy Losabe	ANC	Orange Free State
Evelyn Nompumelelo Lubidla	ANC	Northern Cape
William Lubisi	ANC	Eastern Transvaal
Jabu Mahlangu	ANC	Eastern Transvaal
Simon Makana	ANC	PWV
Henry Gordon Makgothi	ANC	PWV
David Mickey Malatsi	NP	Eastern Transvaal
Anthony Marais	ANC	Orange Free State
Org Marais	NP	PWV
George Mashamba	ANC	Northern Transvaal
Nkoruakae Laynas Mashile	ANC	Northern Transvaal
Govan Mbeki	ANC	Eastern Cape
Ernest Mchunu	ANC	KwaZulu-Natal
Nolutando Mdutyana	ANC	Eastern Cape
Alfred Toto Metele	ANC	Eastern Cape
Wilton Mkwayi	ANC	Eastern Cape
William Fettie Mnisi	DP	PWV
Elphus Mogale	ANC	Northern Transvaal
Michael Mohamed	ANC	North West
Sello Moloto	ANC	Northern Transvaal
Julius Mongwaketse	ANC	Northern Cape
Barnard Mononyane	ANC	Orange Free State
Errol Moorcroft	DP	KwaZulu-Natal
Mohseen Moosa	ANC	PWV
Percylia Mothoagae	ANC	North West
Caleb Motshabi	ANC	Orange Free State
Sam Motsuenyane	ANC	North West
Jackson Mthembu	ANC	Eastern Transvaal
Thommy Themba Mukhuba	ANC	North West
Lawrence Mushwana	ANC	Northern Transvaal
Irene Mutsila	ANC	Northern Transvaal
Indres Naidoo	ANC	PWV
Sathie Naidoo	NP	KwaZulu-Natal
Rita Ndzanga	ANC	PWV
Bulelani Ngcuka	ANC	Western Cape
Boy Nobunga	ANC	Eastern Transvaal
Robert Zamxolo Nogumla	ANC	Eastern Cape
Philip Powell	IFP	KwaZulu-Natal
Ruth Rabinowitz	IFP	KwaZulu-Natal
Raymond Julius Radue	NP	Eastern Cape
Solomon Rasmeni	ANC	North West
Charles Redcliffe	NP	Western Cape
James Selfe	DP	Western Cape
Victor Sifora	ANC	North West
Narend Singh	IFP	KwaZulu-Natal
Jabu Sosibo	ANC	KwaZulu-Natal
Mohamed Ahmed Sulliman	ANC	Northern Cape
Enver Surty	ANC	North West
Louis Johannes Swanepoel	NP	North West
D. P. Linto Taunyane	ANC	Orange Free State
Christmas Fihla Tinto	ANC	Western Cape
Jack Tolo	ANC	Northern Transvaal
Templeton Tonjeni	ANC	Eastern Cape
Midiavhathu Prince Kennedy Tshivase	ANC	Northern Transvaal
Vuyiswa Margaret Tyobeka	ANC	Eastern Cape
Alex van Breda	NP	Western Cape
Adriaan Erasmus van Niekerk	NP	Northern Cape
Kraai van Niekerk	NP	Northern Cape
Carl Werth	FF	PWV
Mark Wiley	NP	Western Cape
Abraham Williams	NP	Western Cape
Musa Zondi	IFP	KwaZulu-Natal

== Delegates to the National Council of Provinces ==
The following lists the permanent delegates to the National Council of Provinces as of 13 November 1998. At that time, Mosiuoa Lekota was the Chairperson of the National Council of Provinces, with Naledi Pandor as his permanent deputy. Mathews Phosa held the second deputy chair, which rotated annually, for 1998.

Member	Party
Cornelius Neels Ackermann	NP
Mohammed Bhabha	ANC
Geoffrey Bongumusa Bhengu	IFP
Andries Abraham Bosman Bruwer	FF
Siyabonga Cwele	ANC
Rosier Jacobus de Ville	FF
Winkie Direko	ANC
Sentle Lavius Emmanuel Fenyane	ANC
Stanley David Fisher	NP
Joseph Alexander Foster	ANC
Pieter Jacobus Gous	FF
Pieter Hendrik Groenewald	FF
Stefan Grové	ANC
Michael Henry	NP
Daniel James Kanyiles	NP
Olive Ntombikayise Khobe	ANC
Gerhard Koornhof	NP
Nocwaka Lamani	ANC
Holomo Joseph Patrick Lebona	ANC
Mosiuoa Lekota	ANC
Evelyn Nompumelelo Lubidla	ANC
William Lubisi	ANC
Henry Gordon Makgothi	ANC
Masilo Isaac Makoela	ANC
Busisiwe Judith Malapane	ANC
David Mickey Malatsi	NP
Piet Marais	NP
Nkoruakae Laynas Mashile	ANC
Govan Mbeki	ANC
Alfred Toto Metele	ANC
William Fettie Mnisi	DP
Ramoeletsi Joseph Mokotjo	NP
Julius Mongwaketse	ANC
Errol Moorcroft	DP
Mohseen Moosa	ANC
Percylia Mothoagae	ANC
Nyambeni Wilson Mudau	ANC
Thommy Themba Mukhuba	ANC
Lawrence Mushwana	ANC
Irene Mutsila	ANC
Bulelani Ngcuka	ANC
Robert Zamxolo Nogumla	ANC
Cehill Hercules Pienaar	IFP
Raymond Julius Radue	NP
James Selfe	DP
Mohamed Ahmed Sulliman	ANC
Enver Surty	ANC
Louis Johannes Swanepoel	NP
Midiavhathu Prince Kennedy Tshivase	ANC
Vuyiswa Margaret Tyobeka	ANC
Barend Johannes van der Walt	FF
Adriaan Erasmus van Niekerk	NP
Musa Zondi	IFP
