= Mavis Magazi =

South African politician (1963–2011)

Member of the National Assembly
- In office 6 May 2009 – 11 November 2011
- Constituency: Gauteng
- In office June 1999 – 1 August 2005
- Constituency: Gauteng

Personal details
- Born: Mavis Nontsikelelo Magazi; 17 May 1963
- Died: 11 November 2011 (aged 48) Thokoza, Gauteng; South Africa
- Citizenship: South Africa
- Party: African National Congress
- Other political affiliations: South African Communist Party
- Nickname: Ntsiki

Mavis Nontsikelelo Magazi (17 May 1963 – 11 November 2011) was a South African politician. She represented the African National Congress (ANC) in the National Assembly from 1999 until 2005, when she resigned after being convicted of defrauding Parliament in the Travelgate scandal. She returned to the assembly from 2009 until her death in 2011. She was also active in the ANC Women's League and South African National Civics Organisation (Sanco) in Gauteng.

== Early life and activism ==
Magazi was born on 17 May 1963. She joined the ANC Women's League in 1990, the year it was relaunched, and during the same period was an active member of Sanco; she was involved in establishing Sanco's national women's desk in 1993. She was also a member of the South African Communist Party.

== Parliament: 1999–2011 ==
Magazi joined the National Assembly in the 1999 general election, gaining election to a seat in the ANC's Gauteng caucus. She was elected to a second term in 2004.

=== Travelgate: 2005 ===
In March 2005, Magazi was among the first MPs convicted on a criminal charge for abusing parliamentary travel vouchers in the Travelgate scandal. She accepted a plea deal with the Scorpions, in terms of which she pled guilty to defrauding Parliament of service benefits worth R63,000. She was sentenced to pay a fine of R60,000 or serve two years' imprisonment, in addition to a mandatory four-year suspended prison sentence.

In June 2005, Magazi and four other convicted MPs – Ruth Bhengu, Mildred Mpaka, Rhoda Joemat, and Pamela Mnandi – announced that they would resign from the National Assembly. She left her seat on 1 August 2005 and was replaced by Winnie Ngwenya.

=== Return: 2009–2011 ===
Magazi returned to the National Assembly in the next general election in 2009 and served in her seat until her death in 2011. At the time of her death, she was also a member of the provincial executive committee of the Gauteng branch of the ANC Women's League.

== Personal life and death ==
Magazi had children and was a close friend of politician Storey Morutoa, whom she met in the anti-apartheid movement. She died on 11 November 2011 in hospital in Thokoza, Gauteng after a lengthy illness with cancer.
