= Bhengu =

Bhengu is a surname. Notable people with the surname include:

- Edward Bhengu (1934–2010), South African activist
- Fezile Bhengu (born 1954), South African politician
- Geoffrey Bhengu (born 1940), South African politician
- Mahlengi Bhengu, South African politician
- Makhosonke Bhengu (born 1983), South African politician
- Mfuniselwa Bhengu (born 1953), South African politician and philosopher
- Nicholas Bhengu (1909–1985), South African evangelist
- Nokukhanya Bhengu (1904–1996) South African teacher, farmer, women's leader and anti-apartheid activist
- Nozipho Bhengu (1974–2006), South African AIDS victim
- Phumelele Bhengu (born 1989), South African footballer
- Phumzile Bhengu-Kombe, South African politician
