= Nozipho =

Nozipho is a feminine given name. Notable people with the name include:

- Nozipho Bhengu (1974–2006), South African woman whose death from an AIDS-related illness intensified the controversy about how AIDS is treated in South Africa
- Nozipho Magagula (born 1994), South African model, medical doctor, beauty queen and environmental activist
- Nozipho Mxakato-Diseko (born 1956), South African diplomat
- Nozipho Schroeder (born 1951), South African lawn bowler
