= Jane Matsomela =

South African politician (1959–2010)

Member of the National Assembly
- In office 2 September 2005 – May 2009

Mayor of Mafikeng
- In office December 2000 – May 2003
- Preceded by: Municipality established
- Succeeded by: Nomvula Hlangwana

Personal details
- Born: 17 May 1959
- Died: 24 August 2010 (aged 51)
- Citizenship: South Africa
- Party: African National Congress

Mothusiemang Johanna Jane Matsomela (17 May 1959 – 24 August 2010), sometimes known as Johanna-Jane Matsomela, was a South African politician who was the inaugural mayor of the Mafikeng Local Municipality from 2000 to 2003. She later represented her party, the African National Congress (ANC), in the National Assembly from 2005 to 2009. Between 2008 and 2009, she was the Chairperson of Parliament's Portfolio Committee on Public Service and Administration.

== Early life and career ==
Matsomela was born on 17 May 1959. In the aftermath of the Pretoria Minute of August 1990, she was centrally involved in launching an ANC branch in Mafikeng (later renamed Mahikeng); she was elected to the branch's inaugural nine-member executive, chaired by Job Mokgoro. During South Africa's post-apartheid transition, she served as Deputy Mayor of Mafikeng, as well as a member of the National Executive Committee of the ANC Women's League.

== Mayor of Mafikeng: 2000–2003 ==
Matsomela was elected as Mayor of the new Mafikeng Local Municipality in the first post-apartheid local elections in 2000, in which she stood as the ANC's mayoral candidate. In late April 2003, Matsomela announced that she had resigned from the office and asked the ANC to appoint her to a new position elsewhere. Her political adviser, Thami Mvambo, told the press that she had resigned in the "spirit of good governance" due to a long-running campaign by the ANC regional chairperson, Themba Gwabeni, to undermine and isolate Matsomela. She continued in the mayoral office until 14 May, when Nomvula Hlangwana was elected to replace her.

== Legislative career: 2005–2009 ==
Matsomela stood for the ANC as a candidate in the 2004 general election but was not initially elected to a seat. Instead, she was sworn in to the National Assembly on 2 September 2005, filling the casual vacancy that arose when Mildred Mpaka resigned after being convicted of fraud in the Travelgate scandal. Matsomela was a member of the Portfolio Committee on Public Service and Administration, and the ANC appointed her to chair the committee in October 2008 after the incumbent chairperson, Richard Baloyi, was promoted to the cabinet.

Matsomela did not stand for re-election in 2009, and she died on 24 August 2010.
