= Mildred Mpaka =

South African politician (born 1966)

Member of the National Assembly
- In office 10 August 1999 – 1 August 2005

Personal details
- Born: 20 December 1966 (age 59)
- Citizenship: South Africa
- Party: African National Congress

Hlonitshwa Mildred Mpaka (born 20 December 1966) is a South African politician who represented the African National Congress (ANC) in the National Assembly from 1999 to 2005. She resigned from her seat during the Travelgate scandal, in which she was convicted of having defrauded Parliament.

== Legislative career ==
Mpaka joined the National Assembly on 10 August 1999, filling the casual vacancy created by Janet Love's resignation. She was elected to a full term in the seat in the 2004 general election.

=== Travelgate ===
In March 2005, Mpaka was among the first MPs convicted on a criminal charge for abusing parliamentary travel vouchers in the Travelgate scandal. She accepted a plea deal with the Scorpions, in terms of which she pled guilty to defrauding Parliament of service benefits worth R75,000. She was sentenced to pay a fine of R80,000 or serve two years' imprisonment, in addition to a mandatory five-year suspended prison sentence.

In June 2005, Mpaka and four other convicted MPs – Ruth Bhengu, Mavis Magazi, Rhoda Joemat, and Pamela Mnandi – announced that they would resign from the National Assembly. Mpaka left her seat on 1 August 2005.
