= Tseko =

Tseko is a masculine given name of South African origin. It may refer to:

- Tseko Monaheng, Mosotho actor
- Simon Tseko Nkoli (1957–1998), South African gay rights, AIDS, and anti-apartheid activist
- Tseko Taabe, South African politician

== See also ==
- Tsekos
