= Group of 77 =

Coalition of developing countries

- Abbreviation: G77
- Named after: Number of founding Member States
- Formation: 15 June 1964; 62 years ago
- Founded at: Geneva, Switzerland
- Type: Intergovernmental
- Purpose: To provide a forum for developing nations to promote their economic interests
- Headquarters: United Nations Headquarters
- Methods: Collective bargaining, lobbying, reports and studies
- Fields: International politics
- Members: 134 member states
- Chair of the Group of 77: Uruguay
- Affiliations: United Nations
- Website: G77.org

The Group of 77 (G77) at the United Nations (UN) is a coalition of developing countries, designed to promote its members' collective economic interests and create an enhanced joint negotiating capacity in the United Nations. The group consists of a diverse set of states with a common South-South ideology. There were 77 founding members of the organization headquartered in Geneva, but it has since expanded to 134 member countries. Uruguay holds its chairmanship for 2026, succeeding Iraq.

The group was founded on 15 June 1964, by 77 non-aligned nations in the "Joint Declaration of the Seventy-Seven Countries" issued at the United Nations Conference on Trade and Development (UNCTAD). The first major meeting was in Algiers in 1967, where the Charter of Algiers was adopted and the basis for permanent institutional structures was begun under the leadership of Raúl Prebisch who had previously worked at ECLA. There are Chapters of the Group of 77 in Geneva (UN), Rome (FAO), Vienna (UNIDO), Paris (UNESCO), Nairobi (UNEP) and the Group of 24 in Washington, D.C. (International Monetary Fund and World Bank).

== Policies ==
The group was credited with a common stance against apartheid and for supporting global disarmament. It has been supportive of the New International Economic Order.

Regarding environmental matters, the G77's position is that the developed countries bear historical responsibility for greenhouse gas emissions, pointing also to the disparity in per capita emissions between the developing and developed countries. As a result, the G77 often resists binding commitments to reduce its emissions. The G77 has been subject to criticism for its lacklustre support, or outright opposition, to pro-environmental initiatives, which the group considers secondary to economic development and poverty eradication initiatives. In turn, the G77 has criticized the wealthier nations for their insufficient attention to poverty eradication, including at the 1992 United Nations Conference on Environment and Development in Rio de Janeiro, Brazil.

== Members ==
Group of 77 countries as of 2013

As of 2023, the group comprises all of the UN member states (along with the UN observer State of Palestine), excluding the following countries:

1. Members of the Council of Europe, except for Azerbaijan.
2. Members of the Commonwealth of Independent States Free Trade Area, except for Tajikistan.
3. Members of the Organisation for Economic Co-operation and Development (OECD), except for all its (four) Latin American members.
4. Two microstates in Oceania: Palau and Tuvalu.

=== Current founding members ===
1. Afghanistan (Note: The G77 continues to recognize the de jure Islamic Republic of Afghanistan.)
2. Algeria
3. Argentina
4. Bangladesh
5. Benin (Note: Joined as Dahomey.)
6. Bolivia
7. Brazil
8. Burkina Faso (Note: Joined as Upper Volta.)
9. Burundi
10. Cambodia
11. Cameroon
12. Central African Republic
13. Chad
14. Chile
15. Colombia
16. Congo
17. DR Congo
18. Costa Rica
19. Dominican Republic
20. Ecuador
21. Egypt (Note: Joined as the United Arab Republic.)
22. El Salvador
23. Ethiopia
24. Gabon
25. Ghana
26. Guatemala
27. Guinea
28. Haiti
29. Honduras
30. India
31. Indonesia
32. Iran
33. Iraq
34. Jamaica
35. Jordan
36. Kenya
37. Kuwait
38. Laos
39. Lebanon
40. Liberia
41. Libya
42. Madagascar
43. Malaysia
44. Mali
45. Mauritania
46. Mexico (Note: Mexico was a founding member but left the Group after joining the OECD in 1994. Its rejoining the organization was approved in 2023. Despite the approval, Mexico does not appear yet as a member on the official website of the organization.)
47. Morocco
48. Myanmar (Note: Joined as Burma.)
49. Nepal
50. Nicaragua
51. Niger
52. Nigeria
53. Pakistan
54. Panama
55. Paraguay
56. Peru
57. Philippines
58. Rwanda
59. Saudi Arabia
60. Senegal
61. Sierra Leone
62. Somalia
63. Sri Lanka (Note: Joined as Ceylon.)
64. Sudan
65. Syria
66. Tanzania (Note: Joined as the United Republic of Tanganyika and Zanzibar.)
67. Thailand
68. Togo
69. Trinidad and Tobago
70. Tunisia
71. Uganda
72. Uruguay
73. Venezuela
74. Vietnam
75. Yemen

=== Other current members ===
1. Angola
2. Antigua and Barbuda
3. Azerbaijan
4. Bahamas
5. Bahrain
6. Barbados
7. Belize
8. Bhutan
9. Botswana
10. Brunei
11. Cape Verde
12. China (Note: Officially considered as a member by the organization, yet not by China itself)
13. Comoros
14. Cuba
15. Djibouti
16. Dominica
17. Equatorial Guinea
18. Eritrea
19. Eswatini (Note: Joined as Swaziland.)
20. Fiji
21. The Gambia
22. Grenada
23. Guinea-Bissau
24. Guyana
25. Ivory Coast
26. Kiribati
27. Lesotho
28. Malawi
29. Maldives
30. Marshall Islands
31. Mauritius
32. Federated States of Micronesia
33. Mongolia
34. Mozambique
35. Namibia
36. Nauru
37. North Korea
38. Oman
39. Palestine (Note: Joined as the Palestine Liberation Organization sometime between 1975 and 1998.)
40. Papua New Guinea
41. Qatar
42. Saint Kitts and Nevis
43. Saint Lucia
44. Saint Vincent and the Grenadines
45. Samoa
46. São Tomé and Príncipe
47. Seychelles
48. Singapore
49. Solomon Islands
50. South Africa
51. South Sudan
52. Suriname
53. Tajikistan
54. Timor-Leste
55. Tonga
56. Turkmenistan
57. United Arab Emirates
58. Vanuatu
59. Zambia
60. Zimbabwe

=== Former members ===
1. Mexico was a founding member but left the Group after joining the OECD in 1994.
2. New Zealand signed the original "Joint Declaration of the Developing Countries" in October 1963 but pulled out of the group before the formation of the G77 in 1964 (it joined the OECD in 1973).
3. South Korea was a founding member but left the Group after joining the OECD in 1996.
4. Yugoslavia was a founding member; by the late 1990s, it was still listed on the membership list, but it was noted that it "cannot participate in the activities of G77." It was removed from the list in late 2003. It had presided over the group from 1985 to 1986.
  - Bosnia and Herzegovina was the only former Yugoslavian state to be listed as a member on the G77 official website in 2007; it was removed from the member list in February 2020.
5. Cyprus was a founding member but was no longer listed on the official membership list after it acceded to the European Union in 2004. A document from 1975 states that Cyprus is not a member.
6. South Vietnam was a founding member, while North Vietnam never joined separately.
7. South Yemen joined separately from founding member North Yemen sometime between 1967 and 1975.
8. Malta was admitted to the Group in 1976 but was no longer listed on the official membership list after it acceded to the European Union in 2004.
9. Palau joined the Group in 2002 but withdrew in 2004, having decided that it could best pursue its environmental interests through the Alliance of Small Island States.
10. Romania was classed as a Latin American country for the purposes of the G77, having joined in 1976. The G77 was divided into geographical regions, and because there was technically no European area, Romania was placed under the umbrella of Latin America. Romania left the G77 following its accession to the European Union.

=== China ===
The Group of 77 lists China as one of its members. The Chinese government provides consistent political support to the G77 and has made financial contributions to the Group since 1994, but it does not consider itself to be a member. As a result, official statements of the G77 are delivered in the name of The Group of 77 and China or G77+China.

== Presiding countries ==
The following is the chain of succession of the chairmanship of the G77:

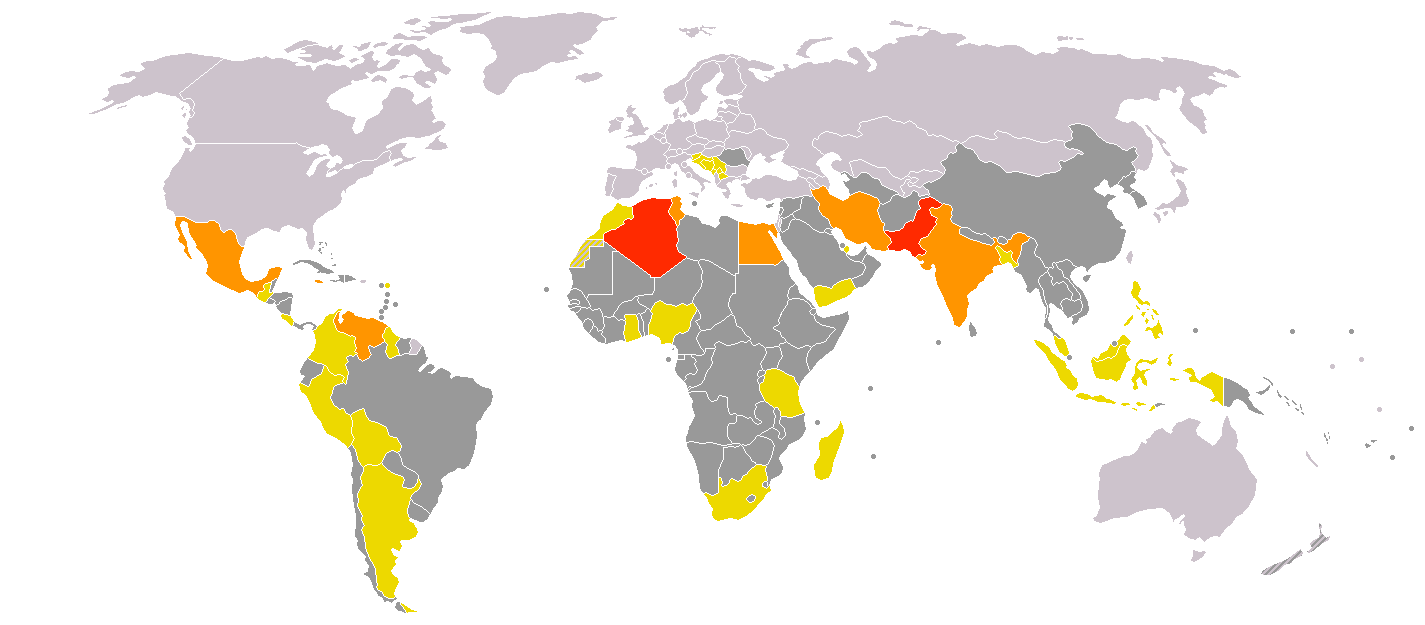
Presiding countries of the G77 since 1970. Colors show the number of times a country has held the position. Gray = never, Yellow = once, Orange = twice, Red = three times

Presiding country	Year
India	1970–71
Peru	1971–72
Egypt	1972–73
Iran	1973–74
Mexico	1974–75
Madagascar	1975–76
Pakistan	1976–77
Jamaica	1977–78
Tunisia	1978–79
India	1979–80
Venezuela	1980–81
Algeria	1981–82
Bangladesh	1982–83
Mexico	1983–84
Egypt	1984–85
Yugoslavia	1985–86
Guatemala	1987
Tunisia	1988
Malaysia	1989
Bolivia	1990
Ghana	1991
Pakistan	1992
Colombia	1993
Algeria	1994
Philippines	1995
Costa Rica	1996
Tanzania	1997
Indonesia	1998
Guyana	1999
Nigeria	2000
Iran	2001
Venezuela	2002
Morocco	2003
Qatar	2004
Jamaica	2005
South Africa	2006
Pakistan	2007
Antigua and Barbuda	2008
Sudan	2009
Yemen	2010
Argentina	2011
Algeria	2012
Fiji	2013
Bolivia	2014
South Africa	2015
Thailand	2016
Ecuador	2017
Egypt	2018
Palestine	2019
Guyana	2020
Guinea	2021
Pakistan	2022
Cuba	2023
Uganda	2024
Iraq	2025
Uruguay	2026

== Group of 24 ==
G-24 countries: Member nations Observer nations

The Group of 24 (G-24) is a chapter of the G-77 that was established in 1971 to coordinate the positions of developing countries on international monetary and development finance issues and to ensure that their interests were adequately represented in negotiations on international monetary matters. Every member of the G-24 is also a member of the G77.

== See also ==
- Non-Aligned Movement
- Third World
- Global South
- North–South divide
- South–South cooperation
- G20 developing nations
- Politics of climate change
- List of country groupings
- List of multilateral free-trade agreements
- Nozipho Mxakato-Diseko
- United Nations Development Programme
- UN Trade and Development III
- Global majority
