= Tsekos =

Tsekos is a Greek surname. It may refer to:

- Christos Tzekos, Greek athletics coach.
- Christos Tsekos (basketball), Greek retired national basketball player
- Zisis Tsekos (born 1964), former Greek footballer

== See also ==
- Tseko
