= Elizabeth Ngaleka =

South African politician (born 1964)

Member of the National Assembly
- In office June 1999 – May 2009

Personal details
- Born: 29 July 1964 (age 61)
- Citizenship: South Africa
- Party: African National Congress

Elizabeth Ngaleka (born 29 July 1964), formerly known as Elizabeth Phantsi, is a South African politician who represented the African National Congress (ANC) in the National Assembly from 1998 to 2009. In 2006, she was convicted of stealing from Parliament in the Travelgate scandal.

== Legislative career ==
Ngaleka joined Parliament in 1998 and was elected to full consecutive terms in 1999, representing the Northern Cape constituency, and in 2004, with no provincial constituency. She served briefly as acting chairperson of the Portfolio Committee on Land and Agricultural Affairs in 2005.

=== Travelgate ===
In February 2005, Ngaleka made her first court appearance in connection with the Travelgate saga. On 6 December 2006, she entered into a plea bargain with the Scorpions, in terms of which she pled guilty in the Cape High Court to one count of theft, pertaining to an amount of R37,000. She was sentenced to pay a fine or serve three years in prison. In March 2007, Ngaleka and the other convicted MPs received a formal reprimand in the house from the Speaker of the National Assembly, and in August of that year, the ANC announced that Ngaleka would be demoted from her position as a party whip.
