= James Vos =

South African politician

Alderman James Vos
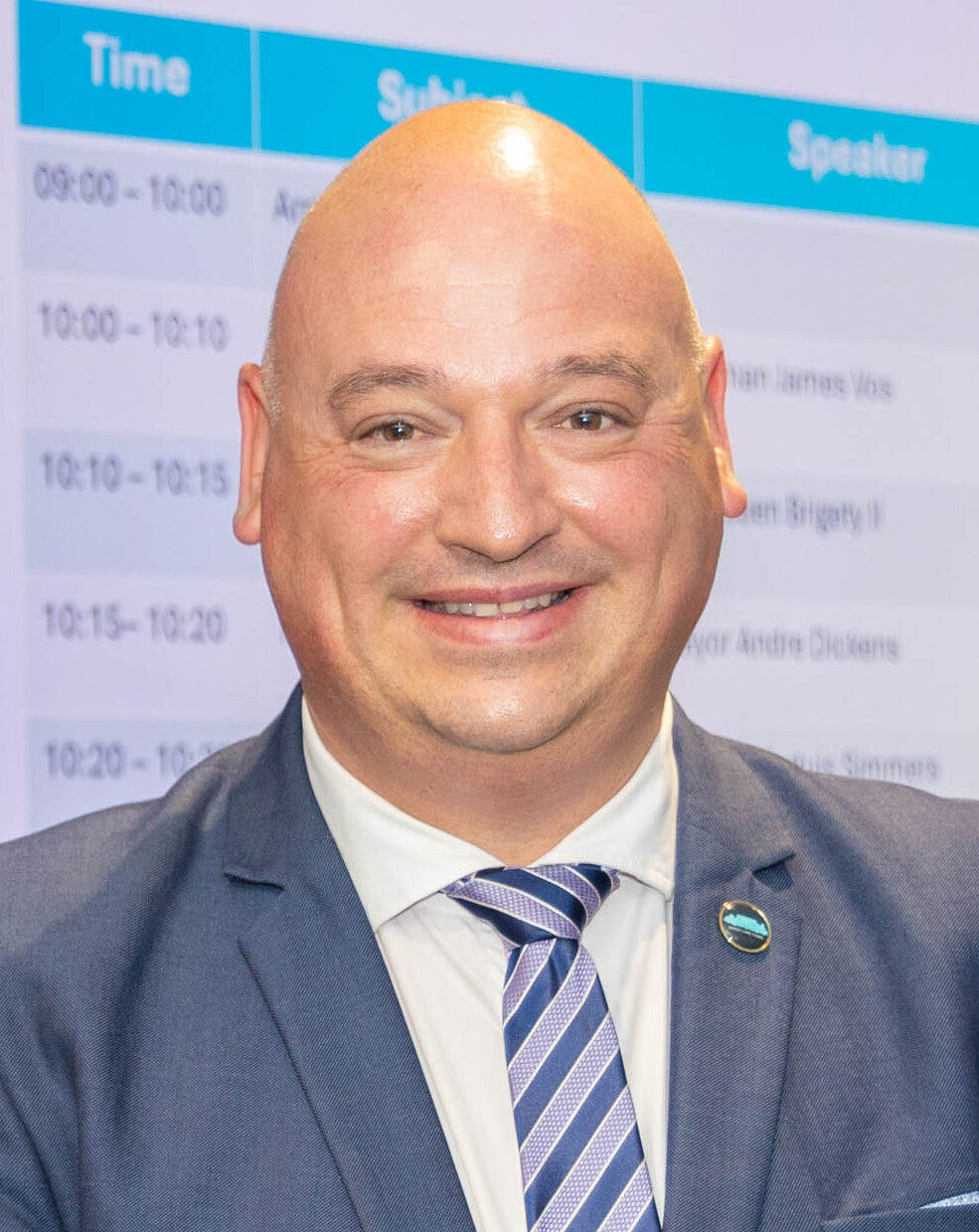
- Vos in 2024

City of Cape Town: Mayoral Committee Member for Economic Growth
- Incumbent
- Assumed office 21 November 2021

City of Cape Town: Mayoral Committee Member for Economic Opportunities and Asset Management
- In office 20 December 2018 – 21 November 2021

Member of the National Assembly of South Africa
- In office 21 May 2014 – 11 November 2018

Shadow Minister of Tourism
- In office 5 June 2014 – 11 November 2018
- Preceded by: Stuart Farrow
- Succeeded by: Manny de Freitas

Personal details
- Born: James Vos
- Party: Democratic Alliance
- Profession: Politician

James Vos is a South African politician. He has been the City of Cape Town's Mayoral Committee Member for Economic Growth since November 2021. He was previously MMC for Economic Opportunities and Asset Management from December 2018 until November 2021. A member of the Democratic Alliance, he served as a Member of the National Assembly of South Africa between May 2014 and November 2018. Vos was also the party's shadow minister of tourism during his time in parliament.

== Political career ==
Vos is a member of the Democratic Alliance. He was sworn in as a member of the National Assembly of South Africa on 21 May 2014. On 5 June 2014, DA parliamentary leader Mmusi Maimane appointed Vos Shadow Minister of Tourism, succeeding Stuart Farrow. He became a member of the Portfolio Committee on Tourism on 20 June 2014.

On 6 November 2018, Dan Plato was elected Mayor of Cape Town. On 11 November, Plato appointed Vos Member of the Mayoral Committee responsible for Economic Opportunities and Asset Management. Vos resigned from parliament on the same day and was sworn in as a councillor on 13 November. Vos assumed office in December after the city council approved the mayoral committee.

In September 2020, Vos announced his candidacy for DA provincial chairperson. He lost to Jaco Londt on 21 November 2020.

On 22 November 2021, Vos was appointed Member of the Mayoral Committee (MMC) responsible for Economic Growth by newly elected mayor Geordin Hill-Lewis.

== Personal life ==
In 2020, Vos contracted COVID-19.
