= Nomvula Hlangwana =

South African politician

Member of the National Assembly
- In office June 2007 – May 2009
- Constituency: North West
- In office 1996–2003

Member of the North West Provincial Legislature
- In office April 2006 – June 2007
- In office 1994–1996

Personal details
- Born: 11 October 1951 (age 74)
- Citizenship: South Africa
- Party: African National Congress

Nomvula Lillian Hlangwana (born 11 October 1951) is a South African politician who represented the African National Congress (ANC) in the National Assembly from 1996 to 2003 and later from 2007 to 2009. She also sat in the North West Provincial Legislature from 1994 to 1996 and from 2006 to 2007, and she was the Mayor of Mafikeng from 2003 to 2006. She is a former member of the ANC's Provincial Executive Committee in the North West.

== Legislative career: 1994–2009 ==
After the end of apartheid in 1994, Hlangwana represented the ANC in the North West Provincial Legislature from 1994 to 1996. In 1996, she was transferred to a seat in the National Assembly, the lower house of the South African Parliament, where she filled a casual vacancy in the ANC caucus. She was elected to a full term in the National Assembly in the next general election in 1999.

However, she resigned towards the end in the legislative term, in mid-2003, when she replaced Johanna-Jane Matsomela as Mayor of Mafikeng. She remained in the mayoral office until the 2006 local elections. On 18 April 2006, she was sworn back in to the North West Provincial Legislature, filling a casual vacancy. At that time she was also a member of the ANC's Provincial Executive Committee in the North West. The following year, on 25 June 2007, she left the provincial legislature to join the National Assembly again, where she filled the vacancy in the ANC's North West caucus arising from the resignation of Nono Maloyi. She left Parliament after the 2009 general election.

== Personal life ==
During the ANC's 52nd National Conference in December 2007, Hlangwana was hospitalised with extreme back pain.
