= Robert Nogumla =

South African politician (born 1956)

Member of the National Assembly
- In office April 2004 – May 2009
- Constituency: Eastern Cape

Delegate to the National Council of Provinces

Assembly Member for Eastern Cape
- In office May 1994 – June 1999

Personal details
- Born: Robert Zamxolo Nogumla; 1 August 1956 (age 69)
- Citizenship: South Africa
- Party: African National Congress

Robert Zamxolo Nogumla (born 1 August 1956) is a South African politician from the Eastern Cape. A member of the African National Congress (ANC), he served terms in the National Council of Provinces, the National Assembly, and the Eastern Cape Provincial Legislature.

== Political career ==
In the 1994 general election, Nogumla was elected to an ANC seat in the Eastern Cape caucus of the Senate of South Africa; he remained in his seat after the Senate was relaunched as the National Council of Provinces under the 1996 Constitution. In the next general election in 1999, he was elected to the Eastern Cape Provincial Legislature, where he served for a single term until, in 2004, he was elected to the National Assembly, representing the Eastern Cape constituency. In 2006, he pled guilty in the trial resulting from the Travelgate scandal.

In 2021 he became mayor of OR Tambo District Municipality. He previously served as deputy mayor.

== See also ==
- List of National Council of Provinces members of the 22nd Parliament of South Africa
- List of National Assembly members of the 24th Parliament of South Africa
