= Tsietsi Louw =

South African politician

Member of the National Assembly
- In office June 1999 – May 2009

Personal details
- Citizenship: South Africa
- Party: African National Congress

Tsietsi Joseph Louw is a South African politician who represented the African National Congress (ANC) in the National Assembly from 1999 to 2009, gaining election in 1999 and 2004. During his second term in the assembly, he served on the Portfolio Committee on Sport and Recreation.

In October 2006, he pled guilty to theft in connection with the Travelgate scandal, admitting that he had wrongly claimed R70,000 in service benefits from Parliament. He paid a fine of R60,000, in lieu of serving three years' imprisonment, and was served with an additional mandatory five-year prison sentence suspended conditionally. He and other implicated MPs were also formally reprimanded in the house by the Speaker of the National Assembly, Baleka Mbete.
