= Alice Sigcawu =

South African politician (born 1952)

Member of the National Assembly
- In office May 1994 – April 2004

Personal details
- Born: 28 August 1952 (age 73) Tabankulu, Cape Province; Union of South Africa
- Party: African National Congress

Alice Nothembisa Sigcawu (born 28 August 1952) is a South African politician who represented the African National Congress (ANC) in the National Assembly from 1994 to 2004. In 2006, she was convicted of stealing from Parliament in the Travelgate scandal.

== Early life ==
Sigcawu was born on 28 August 1952 in Tabankulu in present-day Eastern Cape.

== Political career ==
In South Africa's first post apartheid elections in 1994, Sigcawu was elected to represent the ANC in the National Assembly, the lower house of the new South African Parliament. She was re-elected to a second term in the 1999 general election and left Parliament after the 2004 general election.

After she left Parliament, Sigcawu was one of several MPs who faced criminal charges for abusing parliamentary travel vouchers in the Travelgate scandal. In October 2006, she accepted a plea bargain with the Scorpions, in terms of which she pled guilty to a single count of theft in connection with R120,000 in service benefits. She was sentenced to pay a fine of R50,000 or serve three years' imprisonment, and was also given a mandatory five-year prison sentence suspended conditionally for five years.
