= Charles Redcliffe =

South African politician (born 1946)

Personal details
- Born: Charles Robert Redcliffe; 24 September 1946 (age 79)
- Citizenship: South Africa
- Party: Democratic Alliance (since March 2003)
- Other political affiliations: New National Party; National Party

Charles Robert Redcliffe (born 24 September 1946) is a South African politician. A former Member of Parliament, he represented the National Party and New National Party until March 2003, when he crossed the floor to the Democratic Alliance.

== Political career ==
Originally from the Eastern Cape, Redcliffe was elected to the Western Cape caucus of the Senate of South Africa during the 22nd South African Parliament from 1994; he represented the National Party. During the term of the 22nd Parliament, he was transferred to represent the NP in the Western Cape Provincial Parliament. In 2002, he returned to the national Parliament when he was sworn in to fill a casual vacancy in the National Assembly, now representing the renamed New National Party. During the March 2003 floor-crossing window, he left the New National Party to join the Democratic Alliance. He was not returned to Parliament in 2004.

In 2006, he pled guilty in the trial resulting from the Travelgate scandal. He admitted to using vouchers to take a £1,500 cruise with his wife and to pay for his son's £1,000 honeymoon.

== See also ==
- List of National Council of Provinces members of the 22nd Parliament of South Africa
