= Paulnita Marais =

South African politician

Paulnita Marais MP

Member of the National Assembly
- Incumbent
- Assumed office 26 January 2022

Personal details
- Born: Cape Town, South Africa
- Party: Economic Freedom Fighters
- Spouse: Tony Marais (died 2019)
- Education: University of Cape Town

Paulnita Marais (born 27 September) is a South African politician who has been a Member of the National Assembly since January 2022, representing the Economic Freedom Fighters (EFF). She was formerly a councillor in the Mangaung Metropolitan Municipality.

== Biography ==
Marais was born in Cape Town on 27 September. She studied at the University of Cape Town. She was the manager of VeriCred Credit Bureau Pty Ltd.

In 2016, Marais was elected as an EFF councillor in the Mangaung Metropolitan Municipality. She served as leader of the EFF's municipal caucus during her tenure as a councillor. In January 2020, Marais said that the municipality's Members of the Mayoral Committee (MMCs) should be held accountable for the municipality's problems. Marais accused the ANC's mayoral candidate Mxolisi Siyonzana of being part of divisions in the ANC caucus in August 2021.

On 26 January 2022, Marais was sworn in as a Member of the National Assembly of South Africa.

== Personal life ==
Marais was married to Tony Marais, a former Senator for the African National Congress who joined the EFF in 2013. He died in January 2019 in Heidedal, Bloemfontein, where he had lived with Paulnita and their six children.
