= Martin Kingston =

English investment banker

Martin Lawrence Kingston (born 1957) is an English investment banker who is currently the executive chairman of Rothschild & Co.'s South African operations. He formerly served as the head of Deutsche Bank in South Africa.

== Early life and education ==
Kingston has a Bachelor of Arts degree from Durham University and is a qualified chartered accountant. He was born in 1957 in England.

== Banking career ==
Kingston formerly worked for Morgan, Grenfell & Co. and then for its parent, Deutsche Bank. He moved to South Africa in 1995 and became executive chairman of Deutsche Bank's South African operation in 2003.

At Deutsche, he was reputed for his role in major and innovative ownership transactions conducted in line with South Africa's post-apartheid black economic empowerment (BEE) policy; in 2006, the South African Mail & Guardian nicknamed him "Mr BEE". He advised Transnet on the sale of its stake in the V&A Waterfront and MTN on its acquisition of Investcom, and he was involved in major BEE deals at Lafarge, Kumba, Old Mutual, and Deutsche Bank itself. The Deutsche deal, led by Kingston and primarily financed by Deutsche, was notable for marking the first BEE deal by an international investment bank; in the deal, politician Dali Mpofu's company, Uthajiri Investments Holdings, acquired a 15 per cent stake in Deutsche Bank's South African operations, and the bank's black staff acquired a further 10 per cent.

In June 2006, Kingston that he would depart Deutsche Bank. It was rumoured, and Kingston later confirmed, that he left because the bank wanted to transfer him back to its headquarters in London; as he put it, "I felt there was an ongoing contribution I could make in South Africa".

In October 2006, Rothschild & Co. announced that Kingston would be appointed as executive deputy chairman of Rothschild's relatively nascent South African operation. In the gap before he took up the new position in early 2007, he founded and ran an advisory firm called Longcross Capital. He ultimately became Rothschild's longstanding chief executive officer in South Africa. He was named South Africa's DealMaker of the Year in 2018.

On 1 April 2019, Kingston left his position as Rothschild SA executive officer in order to become the company's executive chairman; in that capacity, he worked alongside Trevor Manuel, who became the company's non-executive chairman at the same time. Kingston told press that he would "wind down" his executive career in "the medium-term", hoping to spend more time on public service in South Africa; he expressed particular interest in the governance of the South African state-owned entities.

== Public service and public–private partnership ==
South African Public Service Minister Malusi Gigaba appointed Kingston as a non-executive director of the national airline, South African Airways, in October 2017. Kingston was put in charge of the airline's long-term turnaround strategy, to the consternation of some unions. He resigned from the board in January 2020, telling press that there was no need for his services because the airline was in business rescue.

Kingston was a central figure in public–private partnerships during the Covid-19 pandemic, leading the Daily Maverick to name him runner-up in its Business Person of the Year 2020 awards. He was the founder and head of the steering committee of Business for South Africa (B4SA), which, among other things, raised funds for the pandemic response and developed an economic recovery strategy for the national economy. Kingston was personally part of the team that ran the Solidarity Fund. In 2023, after the pandemic had subsided, B4SA and the Presidency of South Africa co-launched the Resource Mobilisation Fund, chaired by Kingston, which raised private funds to procure the resources needed to address the South African energy crisis.

Kingston has also served as deputy president of major trade association Business Unity South Africa.

== Personal life ==
Kingston has divorced twice. In 1978, he married Tembi Tambo, the daughter of stalwart anti-apartheid activists Oliver Tambo and Adelaide Tambo; they met and married in the United Kingdom, where Tambo was a student. They had four children before their divorce in 1992. In 1999, he married Pulane Tshabalala, the daughter of another South African political family, headed by her mother Manto Tshabalala-Msimang and stepfather Mendi Msimang. Tito Mboweni, whom Kingston had known since the 1980s in England, was his best man at the wedding.

In 2024, after both of Pulane's parents had died, IOL reported that Kingston was engaged in a court battle with Pulane's brother, Fabian Msimang, over occupation of the Msimang family's home in Waterkloof Ridge, which Kingston co-owned.
