= Angie Molebatsi =

South African politician

Member of the National Assembly
- In office 6 May 2009 – 7 May 2019
- In office June 1999 – April 2004

Personal details
- Citizenship: South Africa
- Party: African National Congress

Maapi Angelina Molebatsi is a South African politician who represented the African National Congress (ANC) in the National Assembly. She first served in the assembly between 1999 and 2004, representing the ANC in the North West. She served two further terms consecutively from 2009 to 2019, during which time she was a member of the Portfolio Committee on Police.

In the interim, from February 2006, Molebatsi faced criminal charges for defrauding Parliament in connection with the so-called Travelgate scandal: she was one of several politicians accused of having abused the system of parliamentary travel vouchers between 1999 and 2004. In October 2006, she signed a plea bargain with the Scorpions, in terms of which she pled guilty to theft in the Cape High Court. She was sentenced to pay a fine of R25,000 or serve three years' imprisonment, with an additional mandatory sentence of five years suspended conditionally.
