= Ruth Bhengu =

South African politician (born 1952)

Member of the National Assembly
- In office 6 May 2009 – 7 May 2019
- In office June 1999 – 1 August 2005

Personal details
- Born: 24 May 1952 (age 73) Pietermaritzburg, Natal; Union of South Africa
- Party: African National Congress
- Other political affiliations: South African National Civics Organisation
- Children: Nozipho Bhengu (d. 2006)

Nozabelo Ruth Bhengu (born 24 May 1952), formerly known as Ruth Ntshulana-Bhengu, is a South African politician and businesswoman who represented the African National Congress (ANC) in the National Assembly until 2019. She is also a former president of the South African National Civic Organisation (SANCO) and was a member of the ANC's National Executive Committee from 2007 to 2022.

Bhengu's first stint in Parliament lasted from June 1999 until August 2005, when she resigned after being convicted of defrauding Parliament in the Travelgate scandal. During that period, she became famous for a 2001 parliamentary speech in which she disclosed that her daughter, Nozipho Bhengu, was HIV-positive. After leaving Parliament, she served as deputy mayor of Ugu District Municipality from 2006 to 2009. Until then SANCO's deputy president, she was elected to the organisation's presidency in December 2008.

She returned to Parliament in 2009 as a prominent supporter of newly elected President Jacob Zuma. She served two consecutive terms before failing to gain re-election in the 2019 general election.

== Early life and activism ==
Bhengu was born on 24 May 1952 in Pietermaritzburg in the former Natal province (later KwaZulu-Natal). She is Zulu. According to Bhengu, she became interested in politics during high school as a result of the apartheid-era Bantu Education system and particularly related policies on medium of instruction.

She was trained in community development by a trade union and became active in community organising and activism, serving on a residents' association that later affiliated to the South African National Civic Organisation (SANCO). She was recruited by a member of the African National Congress (ANC) in 1987. She launched Third World Shops affiliated to the anti-apartheid movement and launched a development consultancy in 1995.

== Political career ==
=== National Assembly: 1999–2005 ===
Bhengu was first elected to the National Assembly in the 1999 general election, and she chaired the Portfolio Committee on Sport and Recreation during the legislative term that followed. She was elected to a second term in the 2004 general election, on that occasion representing the KwaZulu-Natal constituency, and was initially reappointed to the same chairmanship. In June 2004, the ANC reshuffled its parliamentary caucus and Bhengu swopped places with Yunus Carrim, becoming chairperson of the Portfolio Committee on Provincial and Local Government.

==== HIV/AIDS activism ====
In May 2001, during the height of the HIV/AIDS epidemic in South Africa, Bhengu rose to national prominence when she disclosed in a parliamentary speech that her daughter, Nozipho Bhengu, had been diagnosed as HIV-positive in 1998. She received a standing ovation in the house and was lauded for combatting the stigma around HIV. She later said that she had made the disclosure with her daughter's permission, as a response to her fellow MPs' impersonal and callous approach to policymaking.

During her groundbreaking speech to Parliament, Bhengu called for the Speaker of the National Assembly to set up counselling services in Parliament for MPs affected by HIV/AIDS, and she later called on the government to introduce mandatory HIV testing for sexually active residents. However, Nozipho, in line with the prevailing policy of President Thabo Mbeki's government, eschewed anti-retroviral treatment in favour of the natural dietary treatment advocated by Tine van der Maas and Health Minister Manto Tshabalala-Msimang. When Nozipho died of AIDS-related illness in 2006, the Treatment Action Campaign pointed out that Bhengu's death had probably been preventable with anti-retrovirals, a statement condemned as insensitive and politically self-serving by the Bhengu family's spokesman, Mtholephi Mthimkhulu. Nozipho's memoir, Against the Wall, was published posthumously in 2008, with a chapter by Bhengu.

==== Travelgate ====
Bhengu was one of several ANC MPs who faced criminal charges for abusing parliamentary travel vouchers in the Travelgate scandal. In April 2004, she accepted a plea deal and pled guilty to defrauding Parliament in respect of service benefits worth R43,000. She was sentenced to pay a fine of R45,000 or serve two years' imprisonment, with a mandatory additional three-year prison sentence suspended for five years. In June 2005, the ANC announced that Bhengu and four others would resign from Parliament due to their involvement in the scandal. She formally left her seat on 1 August 2005 and was replaced by Shakes Cele.

=== Ugu Municipality: 2006–2009 ===
Ahead of the 2006 local elections, Bhengu was ranked first on the ANC's party list for election as a proportional-representation councillor in Ugu District Municipality in KwaZulu-Natal, making her a likely mayoral candidate. Her candidacy was controversial, given her recent Travelgate conviction, and the opposition Democratic Alliance said that it demonstrated that the ANC "actively condones corruption and holds local government voters in contempt" and called for her to withdraw. The ANC's KwaZulu-Natal branch said that Bhengu "showed signs of remorse" and was "being given another chance by the ANC to serve the people of this country"; ANC provincial secretary Senzo Mchunu said, "All we can say is that all those who believe they have not sinned, we shall allow them to throw stones at Ntshulana-Bhengu." Bhengu argued that she was being held to a double standard, pointing out that Hansie Cronje, Phillip Powell, and Brian Mitchell had been allowed to re-enter civic life:

If the people who continue to call me a fraudster despite the fact that I have apologised and served my dues do not say the same thing to the people I have mentioned, it means that they are racists. How many times should I apologise and how different is my apology to the ones made by Cronje, Mitchell and Powell?

She was elected to an ANC seat in the Ugu council and became deputy mayor, deputising Sithembiso Cele.

==== Rise in the ANC and SANCO ====
By the time she entered local government, Bhengu had served in the regional executive of the ANC in Pietermaritzburg. She was viewed as a supporter and "lieutenant" of Zweli Mkhize, the incumbent provincial chairperson of the ANC in KwaZulu-Natal. She also held senior national office in SANCO as deputy president under Mlungisi Hlongwane. In 2006, she acted as SANCO president while Hlongwane was suspended.

In those capacities, she was a prominent supporter of former Deputy President Jacob Zuma, who at the time was campaigning to oust President Mbeki as ANC president. In July 2006, she lamented the corruption charges against Zuma, telling the Scorpions to "leave Msholozi [Zuma] alone so that he can lead the people". She was later among the group of ANC members who attended rallies outside Zuma's court hearings.

The ANC held its 52nd National Conference in December 2007 and elected Zuma as ANC president. At the same conference, Bhengu was nominated to stand for election to the ANC National Executive Committee (NEC); her candidacy apparently had the support of the Zuma camp. She was elected and, by number of votes received, was the 39th-most popular candidate of the 80 ordinary members elected. In addition, in December 2008, Bhengu was elected as SANCO's national president after Hlongwane resigned from the ANC; she beat Richard Mdakane in a vote, receiving 792 votes to his 510.

=== Return to Parliament: 2009–2019 ===
==== Transport Chairperson: 2009–2014 ====
Ahead of the 2009 general election, in which Zuma stood successfully as the ANC's presidential candidate, Bhengu was included on the ANC's party list for election to the National Assembly, again over the complaints of the Democratic Alliance. She returned to Parliament after the election and was nominated to chair the Portfolio Committee on Transport.

Her chairmanship became problematic in early 2012, when the Sowetan reported that Bhengu's company, Riblore 22 cc, was in negotiations to sell oil to minibus taxi drivers through the South African National Taxi Council (SANTACO). Press suggested that she was vulnerable to a conflict of interest, since her portfolio committee was responsible for regulating the taxi industry and for overseeing one of SANTACO's donors, the Department of Transport. The Sowetan's reporting gave rise to an investigation by Parliament's ethics committee, which found in August 2012 that Bhengu had not contravened the code of conduct but which referred the potential conflict of interest to the Speaker's office.

During the legislative term, Bhengu remained in office as SANCO president, and in December 2012 she was re-elected to the ANC NEC, ranked eighth of the 80 members elected. After her re-election, the NEC designated her as its official representative in the ANC's Limpopo branch.

==== Small Businesses Chairperson: 2014–2019 ====
In the 2014 general election, she was placed in a comfortable position on the ANC's party list, ranked 46th, and after the election she was nominated to chair the Portfolio Committee on Small Business Development. She was re-elected to a third term on the NEC in December 2017, ranked 45th of the 80 members elected.

However, ahead of the next general election in 2019, Bhengu was, in the Witness's phrase, "overlooked" on the ANC's party list; she dropped to the near-unelectable rank of 175th. In addition, in May 2019, the ANC's internal Integrity Commission included Bhengu on a list of 23 candidates whose candidacy should be reconsidered on the grounds of mismanagement or corruption; the Electoral Commission of South Africa had earlier received formal public objections to her candidacy.

== Later career ==
After failing to gain re-election in the 2019 election, Bhengu worked as a full-time businesswoman. She supported Zweli Mkhize's unsuccessful campaign to become ANC president ahead of the party's 55th National Conference in December 2022; at that conference, she was not re-elected to the NEC.

== Personal life ==
Bhengu has children and in 2005 said she was a single mother.

== See also ==
- HIV/AIDS denialism in South Africa
