= Tine van der Maas =

South African nutritionist

- Born: 15 March 1954 (age 71); Buenos Aires, Buenos Aires
- Occupations: Nutritionist, Nurse
- Known for: HIV & AIDS alternative treatment

Tine van der Maas (born 15 March 1954) is an Argentine-born South African nutritionist and HIV/AIDS denialist. Her family is originally of Dutch origin before immigrating to South Africa. She started treating people with AIDS in 1989.

Van der Maas was born in Buenos Aires, Argentina. She is best known for her natural treatment of AIDS and related diseases with a lemon mixture, garlic and beetroot. She was the caretaker of Nozipho Bhengu, who died in 2006 from an AIDS-related illness after being persuaded to stop taking her medication. Bhengu posthumously became a center of awareness on HIV/AIDS.

Former South African president Thabo Mbeki questioned the link between HIV and AIDS. In his speech to the 13th International AIDS Conference in Durban (2000), he stated, "The world's biggest killer and the greatest cause of ill health and suffering across the globe, including South Africa, is extreme poverty." This occurred at the same time Tine van der Maas came to public attention working with then Minister of Health, Dr. Manto Tshabalala-Msimang.
