= Jabu Sosibo =

South African politician (born 1947)

Member of Parliament
- In office May 1994 – 6 May 2014

Personal details
- Born: 6 August 1947 (age 77)
- Citizenship: South Africa
- Political party: African National Congress

Jabu Elsie Sosibo (born 6 August 1947) is a South African politician who represented the African National Congress (ANC) in Parliament from 1994 to 2014. She served both in the Senate, where she represented the KwaZulu-Natal constituency, and in the National Assembly. In 2006, she was convicted of having defrauded Parliament in the Travelgate scandal.

== Legislative career ==
Sosibo was born on 6 August 1947. In South Africa's first post-apartheid elections in 1994, she was elected to represent the ANC in the KwaZulu-Natal caucus of the Senate, but she was transferred to the National Assembly during the legislative term that followed. She was re-elected to the National Assembly in the 1999 general election and ultimately remained in her seat until 2014.

=== Travelgate ===
In August 2004, the Scorpions announced that Sosibo was one of several MPs who was under investigation for suspected involvement in the Travelgate scam, which involved the abuse of parliamentary travel vouchers. She was charged with fraud in June 2005.

While awaiting trial, Sosibo was also summoned in a liquidation inquiry pertaining to one of the travel agencies involved in the scam. Liquidators applied for the sequestration of Sosibo's estate, claiming that she owed a travel agency about R240,000 for rental vehicles hired over 378 days (over a period of 1,016 days). Sosibo said that she had only rented the cars for work-based travel and suggested that the travel agency had, without her knowledge, used her travel vouchers, and therefore her name, to defraud Parliament. She also criticised media coverage of the scandal, saying that it had created a false perception of public representatives as corrupt and self-interested. The sequestration did not proceed because a settlement was reached, but the Mail & Guardian reported that Sosibo's case – and the similar case of Barbara Thomson – had contributed to "mounting anger" among MPs about the ANC's political management of the Travelgate scandal. MPs told the newspaper that the ANC's chief whip, Mbulelo Goniwe, had pressured Sosibo and Thomson to settle with liquidators for political reasons but had not extended financial assistance to them; instead, he had apparently facilitated loans to Sosibo and Thomson, from a private lender, on highly unfavourable terms.

On 6 December 2006, Sosibo entered into a plea bargain, in terms of which she pled guilty in the Cape High Court to having defrauded Parliament in connection with an amount of R241,000. She was sentenced to pay a fine of R100,000 or serve five years' imprisonment.

During the next term in the National Assembly, Sosibo's last, she served as an ANC whip in various committees. She left Parliament after the 2014 general election.

== Personal life ==
She has children and grandchildren.
