= Nozizwe Madlala-Routledge =

South African politician (born 1952)

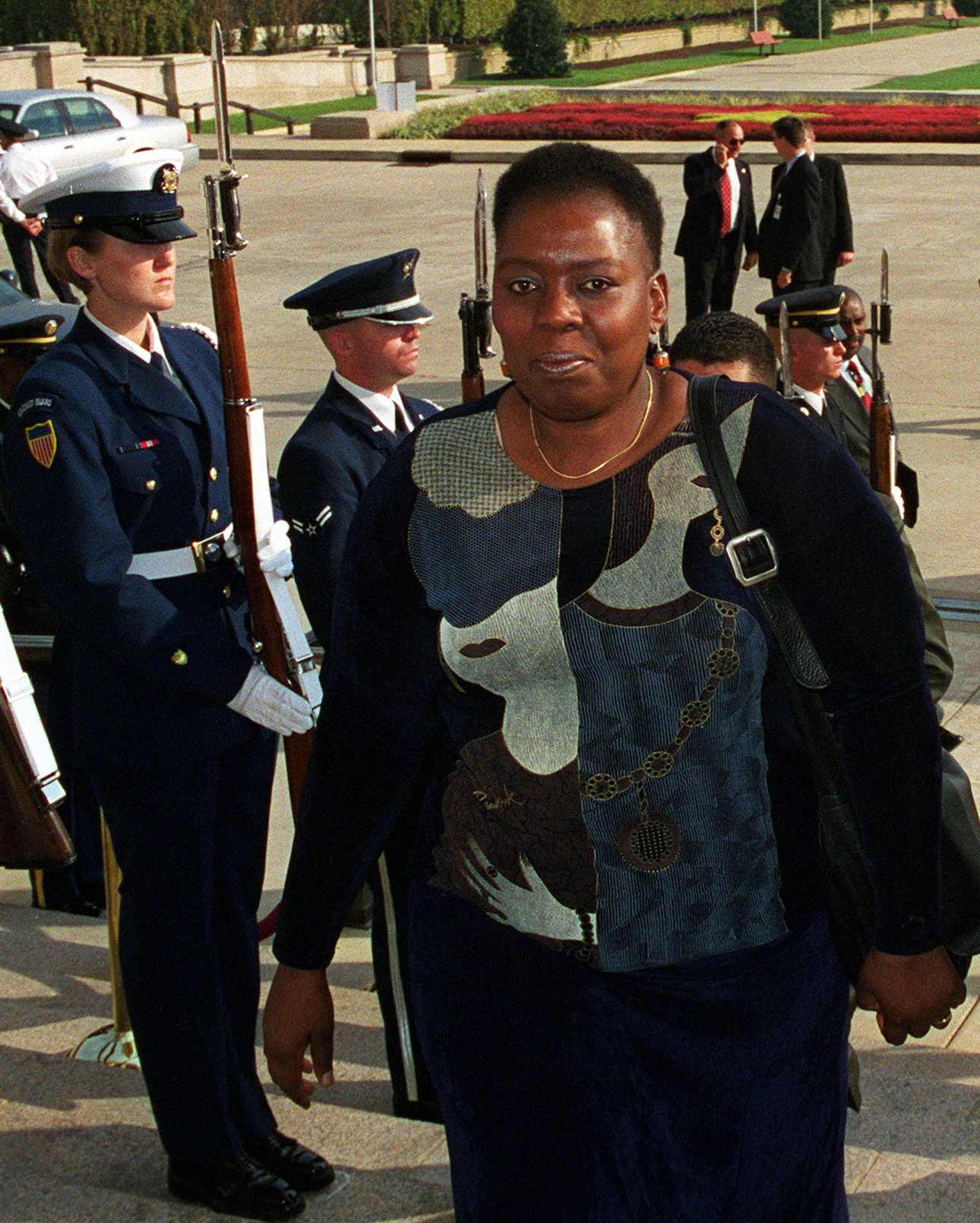
- Madlala-Routledge at the Pentagon (October 2000)

Deputy Minister of Health
- In office April 2004 – 8 August 2007
- President: Thabo Mbeki

Deputy Minister of Defence
- In office 1999 – April 2004

Personal details
- Born: 29 June 1952 (age 74)
- Party: African National Congress
- Spouse: Jeremy Routledge
- Children: 2

Nozizwe Charlotte Madlala-Routledge (born 29 June 1952) is a South African politician who was South Africa's Deputy Minister of Defence from 1999 to April 2004 and Deputy Minister of Health from April 2004 to August 2007. President Thabo Mbeki dismissed her from the Cabinet on 8 August 2007, after which she maintained her role as a member of parliament representing the African National Congress. On 25 September 2008, she became Deputy Speaker of the National Assembly, serving in that capacity until resigning from Parliament in early May 2009. She has been a member of the South African Communist Party since 1984.

Madlala-Routledge is well known for helping combat AIDS in South Africa, and is considered by many to have resisted government denial of the severity of the epidemic. She was also an opponent of the use of alternative medicine treatments of HIV in place of scientifically tested methods.

More recently, Madlala-Routledge served for a short period as the executive director of Inyathelo: The South African Institute for Advancement until March 2015 when she resigned following problems with the board.

In August 2021, it was announced that Madlala-Routledge would serve as the next director of the Quaker United Nations Office in Geneva. In July 2024 the Quaker United Nations Office in Geneva announced that Malala-Routledge had left on 30 June 2024 to take up new challenges.

== Early life and education ==
Born on 29 June 1952 in Magog, Umzumbe, Nozizwe Charlotte Madlala is a South African of Zulu descent and a Quaker. She was brought up by her single mother in what was formerly the Zulu Kingdom, now the southern region of the province of KwaZulu-Natal. After schooling at Magog Primary and Fairview Primary, she matriculated at the Inanda Seminary School in Durban. She went on to study medicine at the University of Natal but was distracted by Steve Biko of the Black Consciousness Movement who involved her in student politics. After completing her first year, in 1971 she transferred to the University of Fort Hare to study for a BSc Once again coming under Biko's influence, she ran into trouble in 1972 for participating in a student boycott. Refusing to apologize for her behaviour, she was dismissed. In 1991, she earned a diploma in adult education from the University of Natal. During her studies, she compiled a manual on Lay Care for the Elderly and wrote easy readers in the Zulu language for newly literate adults. She also obtained a diploma in medical technology, resulting in six years employment as a medical laboratory technologist.

After a long interruption, in 2006 Madlala-Routledge took up her studies once more. In 2010, she graduated from the University of Cape Town in social science, with majors in philosophy and sociology.

== Political career ==
Madlala-Routledge joined the underground African National Congress in 1979 and in 1983, she participated in establishing the Natal Organisation of Women, becoming its first chair. After a prolonged period of imprisonment without trial, including a year in solitary confinement, she joined the South African Communist Party, first as regional chair in Natal, later as a member of its central committee. In 1990, following the unbanning of political organisations, she became a member of the executive committee of the Women's National Coalition. She also contributed to the work of the sub-council on the status of women and helped to prepare policy on the empowerment of women under the Reconstruction and Development Programme. In 1993, she won a seat in the country's revamped parliament.

On 17 June 1999, Madlala-Routledge became the first woman in South Africa to be appointed Deputy Minister of Defence. She held the post until April 2004, when she became Deputy Minister of Health. In that capacity, she strove relentlessly for more effective measures to combat AIDS which at the time was spreading rapidly and causing up to a thousand deaths per day. More than five million South Africans or 12% of the population were reported to be infected with HIV. She was strongly opposed by the minister Manto Tshabalala-Msimang who preferred to rely on African treatments such as garlic, beet root and African potatoes rather than modern drugs.

== Dismissal as Deputy Minister of Health ==
On 8 August 2007 on the eve of National Women's Day, Madlala-Routledge was removed from office as Deputy Minister of Health by President Thabo Mbeki. There was some speculation as to the specific reason of her dismissal at the time, given certain speculative elements. These included the long-term disharmony and disagreement on HIV/AIDS and other issues between herself and the Minister of Health (Dr. Manto Tshabalala-Msimang); her findings supporting a damning report by the Daily Dispatch on conditions in the maternity ward at Frere Hospital, which were contradicted by Tshabalala-Msimang and president Mbeki. More importantly, she had failed to receive approval for a trip to an AIDS conference in Spain, which was declined by president Mbeki after she had left. Another factor was that in December 2006, she had described "denial at the very highest levels" over South Africa's policy on AIDS.

A press release by the presidency failed to cite any reason for her dismissal, apparently because the president was not obliged to give any reason for sacking a minister. Madlala-Routledge later revealed in a press conference that the president had called a meeting asking for her to resign citing the unauthorised trip to an international AIDS conference in Spain but she had declined. The next day she was officially dismissed. Her sacking was criticized by opposition parties and AIDS organisations. The Treatment Action Campaign commented: "This is a dreadful error of judgment that will harm public healthcare."

=== Background of dismissal ===
==== Clashes with the Health Minister over HIV/AIDS ====
The dismissal had come after a long period of repeated public clashes with the Minister of Health, Manto Tshabalala-Msimang over national HIV/AIDS policy.

==== Conflicting reports over Frere Hospital ====
The two ministers had also released conflicting reports over the conditions of the maternity ward at Frere hospital, in the Eastern Cape province. Madlala-Routledge had reported that conditions at the maternity ward were a 'national disaster'. This was contradicted by Msimang, who reported that her deputy's comments were based on 'untruths', that the mortality rate at the hospital had been exaggerated, and that the infant death rates were 'in line with the national average'.

These events were preceded by an exposé in the Daily Dispatch newspaper over the allegedly appalling conditions at the hospital. Madlala-Routledge first paid a visit to the hospital, which had not been scheduled nor communicated to the hospital, and after her report, Msimang subsequently paid a scheduled and announced visit to the hospital. Finally, writing in his weekly column, president Thabo Mbeki had defended Msimang's report on Frere Hospital and downplayed the Daily Dispatch's investigations as inflammatory, effectively dismissing the deputy minister's views.

==== 'Unauthorised' trip to AIDS conference in Spain ====
Madlala-Routledge travelled to an international AIDS conference in Spain, which had received approval from the necessary departments but had been forwarded to the President for approval and thus, Presidential approval had not been granted at the time she made the trip. Ultimately, President Mbeki declined authorisation of the trip, which happened when she was already en route to Spain. Upon arrival, and being informed of the declination, Madlala-Routledge cancelled her visit to the conference and travelled home immediately.

In a press conference after her dismissal, Madlala-Routledge stated that it is common for ministers to travel without receiving an approval answer from the presidency because ministers often leave at such short notice.

== Political career following dismissal ==
In December 2007, she was elected to the ANC's National Executive Committee in 33rd place. From September 2008 to May 2009, she was deputy speaker of the National Assembly, after which she remained a member of parliament. Madlada-Routledge was appointed a parliamentary caucus chair of the African National Congress in 2008 but left the following year to study Social Science at the University of Cape Town, graduating in 2010. That year she became a co-founder of Embrace Dignity, a human rights organisation fighting sex trafficking and sexual exploitation. The organisation proposes that sex work itself be decriminalised, but that clients of sex workers become criminally liable.

In April 2014 she launched the "Vote No" campaign alongside fellow ANC member and former government minister Ronnie Kasrils. The campaign aimed to encourage people to cast protest votes or spoilt ballots in the 2014 general election as a protest against Jacob Zuma and the perceived corruption of his government. In June 2015 she became executive director of the South African Institute for Advancement (Inyathelo) but resigned in March 2016, protesting the payment of a golden handshake to one of the organisation's founders.

== Personal life ==
Madlala-Routledge is married to Jeremy Routledge whom she met in the early 1980s. They have two sons, Martin and Simon. She resides in Cape Town.

A Quaker and former ANC and SA Communist Party underground operative in KwaZulu Natal, she was one of the four-strong SACP delegation to the Convention for a Democratic SA that negotiated the transition from apartheid.

She also served with Cyril Ramaphosa on the working group that drew up the constitutional framework.

== Awards ==
Madlala-Routledge has received the Tanenbaum Peacemakers Award for her work in South Africa and has an honorary doctorate from Haverford College, Pennsylvania. In June 2026, she was presented with a Doctor of The University of Strathclyde, Glasgow, Scotland.
