= Stuart Farrow =

South African politician

Stuart Farrow MP
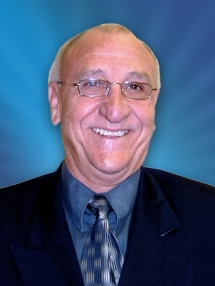

Shadow Minister of Tourism
- In office 2012–2014
- Leader: Helen Zille
- Preceded by: Gregory Krumbock
- Succeeded by: James Vos

Shadow Minister of Transport
- In office 2004–2012
- Succeeded by: Ian Ollis

Member of Parliament for Amathole West, Eastern Cape
- Incumbent
- Assumed office 1999

Personal details
- Born: Umtata, Eastern Cape
- Party: Democratic Alliance
- Profession: Agricultural development

Stuart Farrow is a South African politician, the former Shadow Minister of Transport, and a Member of Parliament for the opposition Democratic Alliance (DA). He is also one of the party's parliamentary whips.

== Background ==
Farrow was born in Umtata, and currently lives in Plettenberg Bay. He is married with three daughters and three grandchildren. His son died in a rugby accident in February 2006.

Farrow went to school in the Cape but joined his family in Rhodesia (now Zimbabwe) during the 1960s and 1970s. He attained qualifications in civil engineering, agricultural science, leadership management and planning fields. As a student he joined the Progressive Federal Party, the anti-apartheid minority party which was the forerunner to today's Democratic Alliance. He served in various positions, including branch chairperson and provincial chairperson in the Eastern Cape. He is currently chairperson of the Eastern Cape joint caucus. In addition, he serves on the federal and provincial councils of the party.

Farrow's career has focused on the field of agricultural development, where he worked in top management positions at agencies in Zimbabwe and the Eastern Cape. He subsequently ran his own business and consultancy, helping to link markets to disadvantaged areas in the Eastern Cape.

== Parliament ==
Farrow was elected to Parliament in 1999. He retained his seat in 2004, and has served on numerous portfolio committees, including Agriculture and Land Affairs, Health, Public Enterprises and Public Works. He is the DA Shadow Minister of Transport. He was appointed as a whip on his re-election to Parliament in 2009.

== Issues ==
=== Bus Rapid Transit ===
Farrow is a proponent of the new bus rapid transit (BRT) system, and was critical of Jacob Zuma's decision to halt the BRT's implementation after pressure from taxi owners - arguing that this could compromise transport readiness ahead of the 2010 World Cup.

=== eNatis ===
Farrow called for former Transport Minister Jeff Radebe to appear before parliament's portfolio committee on transport after months of problems with testing stations and huge backlogs. He has suggested that the failures are due to the contracting and tendering process.

=== Ndebele's gift ===
Farrow was a vocal critic of KwaZulu-Natal Transport Minister S'bu Ndebele after Ndebele received a R1-million Mercedes-Benz from a company with R400-million in contracts with his own provincial department, and called on Ndebele to return the vehicle. Though President Jacob Zuma informed Ndebele he was not obliged to return the car, Ndebele felt that it was ANC principle as he handed back the vehicle.

== Constituency ==
Farrow's constituency stretches across large parts of the rural Eastern Cape. His constituency office is in Queenstown. Other towns in his constituency include Maclear, Ugie, Elliot, Indwe, Calla, Encoba, Lady Frere, Dordrecht, and Tarkastad.

== Offices held ==
Political offices
Preceded by ?	South African Shadow Minister of Transport; 2004–present	Incumbent
