= Lillian Ntembe =

South African politician (born 1962)

Member of the National Council of Provinces
- In office 13 October 2005 – May 2009

Personal details
- Born: 2 October 1962 (age 63)
- Citizenship: South Africa
- Party: African Christian Democratic Party (since 2009)
- Other political affiliations: Independent Democrats (until 2009)

Baitseng Lillian Ntembe (born 2 October 1962), formerly known as Baitseng Lillian Matlhoahela, is a South African politician who represented the Northern Cape constituency in the National Council of Provinces from 2005 to 2009. She was a member of the Independent Democrats (ID), although she defected to the African Christian Democratic Party (ACDP) in 2009.

== Legislative career ==
In the 2004 general election, Ntembe was elected to an ID seat in the National Assembly, but she declined to accept it and Florence Batyi was sworn in instead. Ntembe joined Parliament the following year, on 13 October 2005, when she was appointed to fill a casual vacancy in the ID's sole seat in the National Council of Provinces.

At the end of the legislative term, she defected to the ACDP, and she was included on the ACDP's party list in the 2009 general election; although she was its top-ranked candidate for election to the Northern Cape caucus of the National Assembly, the party did not win any seats in the caucus and Ntembe was not elected.
