= Nozipho Mxakato-Diseko =

South African diplomat (United Nations)

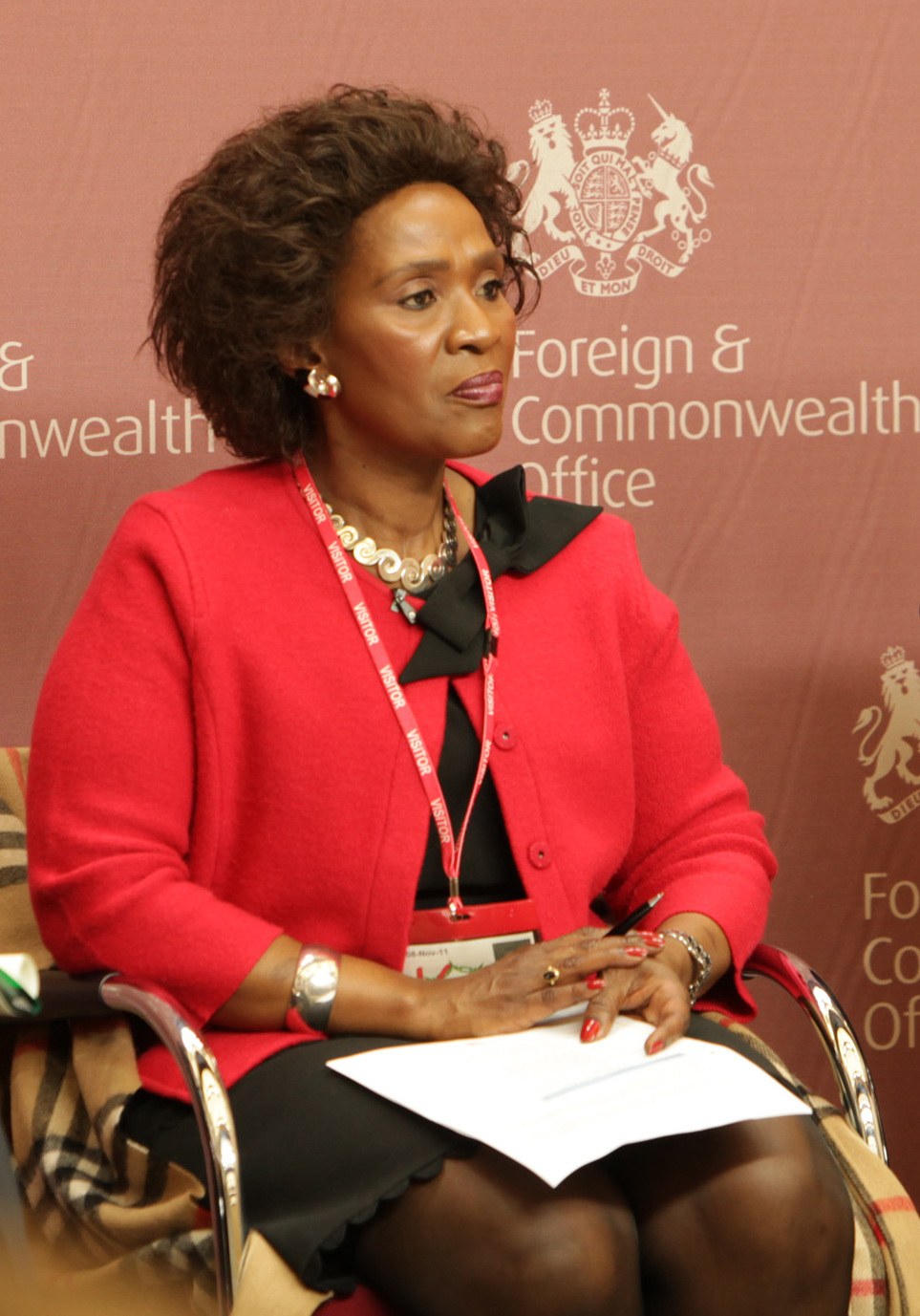
Mxakato-Diseko at Climate Change Question Time event

Nozipho Mxakato-Diseko (1 November 1956) is a South African diplomat. She is currently the United Nations Ambassador for South Africa. For the Paris Agreement, Mxakato-Diseko was the leader of the G77 bloc during negotiations.

== Early life and education ==
Mxakato-Diseko was born in Johannesburg on 1 November 1956. She attended Somerville College, Oxford and has a doctorate in philosophy which she earned in 1991.

== Career ==
Mxakato-Diseko worked as a campaigner for the African National Congress (ANC) and also as an activist in Soweto for the ANC. She also raised money for the British Defence and Aid Fund.

Mxakato-Diseko began as a representative of South Africa at the International Atomic Energy Agency in the mid-1990s. She has been the South African negotiator since 2011.

In 2024, Mxakato-Diseko was appointed by United Nations Secretary-General António Guterres to co-chair the Panel on Critical Energy Transition Minerals, alongside Ditte Juul Jørgensen.
