= Nicholas Bhengu =

South African evangelist (1909–1985)

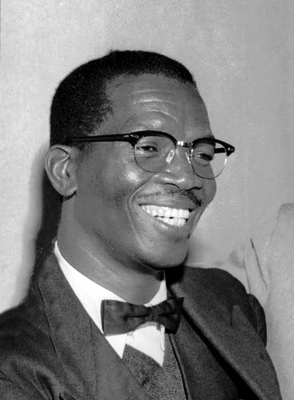

Personal life
- Born: 5 September 1909 KwaZulu Natal, Entumeni
- Died: June 5, 1985 (aged 75)

Religious life
- Religion: Christianity
- Denomination: Assemblies of God

Nicholas Bhekinkosi Hepworth Bhengu (September 5, 1909 – June 5, 1985) was a South African evangelist. Known as "Manotsha", "Papakho", "uMkhulu" or "uKhehla" by his converts, he was the founder of the Africa Back to God Crusade (Assemblies of God) in the 1950s. Bhengu was an evangelist, a teacher of the word, and a pastor. Through his ministry, a very large congregation was built up in the Eastern Cape, KwaZulu-Natal, and the rest of South Africa together with the neighboring countries. Bhengu emphasised holiness and the fear of God, among other things.

== Early years ==
Bhengu was born at eNtumeni Mission Station, KwaZulu-Natal. He was the son of Josiah Khanda—a Lutheran evangelist—and Yele Bhengu. Bhengu was raised as a Christian. He had five brothers and two sisters. Bhengu was "expelled twice [from his birthplace] for his faith as a heretic", first at the age of 21 after he tried to witness to his people after his conversion, and second after he returned to his father's land and settled and built a home, and he was "forced to leave" in 1973 and then settled at Mtunzini.

He was a professional court interpreter. In South Africa, American ministers depended on African interpreters to translate to both Africans (black) and Afrikaans (white). Bhengu became a well-known Zulu minister. He attended the 7th Annual Voice of Healing Convention, "All Roads Lead to Dallas Texas Nov 8–11". In America he became known as "The Black Billy Graham of Africa".

== Ministry ==
Bhengu was the "leader of the African wing" of the Assemblies of God South Africa (AGSA). The first church that Bhengu planted was located at 4th Street and 4th Avenue, in Benoni Old Location. The white missionaries formed International Assemblies of God (IAG). There were disputes regarding resources, power and space, but also race and cultural issues contributed to the split.

He taught his church to be self-sustaining and he also encouraged material independence through hard work. Bhengu died in 1985.
