= Michael Ralegoma =

South African politician

Member of the National Assembly of South Africa
- In office 21 May 2014 – 7 May 2019
- Constituency: Gauteng

Personal details
- Born: Strike Michael Ralegoma
- Party: African National Congress

Strike Michael Ralegoma is a South African politician who served as a Member of the National Assembly of South Africa from 2014 until 2019. He is a member of the African National Congress.

== Parliamentary career ==
Ralegoma stood as an ANC parliamentary candidate from Gauteng in the 2014 national elections, and was subsequently elected to the National Assembly and sworn in on 21 May 2014. He was appointed ANC whip of the Portfolio Committee on Sport and Recreation the following month.

During a meeting of the Portfolio Committee on Sport and Recreation on 20 April 2016, Ralegoma called for the Springbok emblem to be removed from the national rugby team's jersey and for the Protea, which other national sports teams play under, to replace it. Ralegoma said: "For successful transformation, all national teams must play with a single emblem." The ANC subsequently distanced themselves from Ralegoma's comments, saying that removing the Springbok is not party policy.

Ralegoma did not stand for re-election in the 2019 general elections and left parliament on 7 May 2019.
