= Tseko Taabe =

South African politician

Delegate to the National Council of Provinces

Assembly Member for Mpumalanga
- In office 1999–2004

Personal details
- Citizenship: South Africa
- Party: African National Congress
- Other political affiliations: Economic Freedom Fighters (2015–2016)

Tseko Benedict Taabe is a South African politician who represented Mpumalanga in the National Council of Provinces during the 23rd South African Parliament from 1999 to 2004. He was a member of the African National Congress. In 2006, he pled guilty in the trial resulting from the Travelgate scandal.

After leaving Parliament, Taabe was a businessman. He was also involved in local government in Mpumalanga: he was appointed as administrator in Thaba Chweu Local Municipality and deputy administrator in Thembisile Hani Local Municipality when the towns were placed under administration in 2005 and 2010 respectively. In September 2015, he announced that he had resigned from the ANC to join the opposition Economic Freedom Fighters (EFF). Six months later, EFF provincial leader Collen Sedibe said that he had left the party to return to the ANC.

== See also ==
- List of National Council of Provinces members of the 23rd Parliament of South Africa
