= Beauty Dlulane =

South African politician (born 1960)

Chairperson of the Portfolio Committee on Sports, Arts and Culture
- In office 2 July 2019 – 28 May 2024
- Speaker: Thandi Modise; Nosiviwe Mapisa-Nqakula
- Preceded by: Committee established

Chairperson of the Portfolio Committee on Sport and Recreation
- In office 24 June 2014 – 7 May 2019
- Speaker: Baleka Mbete
- Preceded by: Richard Mdakane
- Succeeded by: Committee abolished

Member of the National Assembly
- In office 6 May 2009 – 28 May 2024
- In office 1997 – June 1999

Permanent Delegate to the National Council of Provinces

Assembly Member for Eastern Cape
- In office June 1999 – May 2009

Personal details
- Born: 23 November 1960 (age 65)
- Citizenship: South Africa
- Party: African National Congress
- Other political affiliations: South African Communist Party

Beauty Nomvuzo Dlulane (born 23 November 1960) is a South African politician who served as the chairperson of the Portfolio Committee on Sports, Arts and Culture in the National Assembly of South Africa. She represented the African National Congress (ANC) in Parliament from 1997 until 2024. Between 2012 and 2022, she was also a member of the National Executive Committee of the ANC.

Dlulane entered the National Assembly in 1997 but then spent a decade, from 1999 to 2009, in the National Council of Provinces, where she was the provincial whip for the Eastern Cape delegation. During that period, in October 2006, she was convicted of defrauding Parliament in the Travelgate scandal. After she returned to the National Assembly in the 2009 general election, she chaired Parliament's multi-party women's caucus from 2009 to 2014 and then chaired the Portfolio Committee on Sport and Recreation from 2014 to 2019. She was elected as the chairperson of the Portfolio Committee on Sports, Arts and Culture after the 2019 general election, when the committee was established.

== Early life and career ==
Dlulane was born on 23 November 1960. She grew up in the Transkei region of the Eastern Cape, where, during apartheid, she was inspired by the activism of James Kati and Alfred Xobololo, as well as by her elder siblings and by the 1976 Soweto uprising. She completed high school to grade 10, and later she worked in the postal services; on one occasion, she was arrested for her involvement in recruitment for the Transkei Post Office Workers Association, a trade union.

After anti-apartheid organisations were unbanned in 1990, she served in the regional leadership of the African National Congress (ANC) and in the provincial leadership of the South African Communist Party. She was also a founding member of the South African National Civic Organisation's branch in Mthatha, Eastern Cape.

== Parliament of South Africa: 1997–present ==
In 1997, Dlulane joined the National Assembly, the lower house of the South African Parliament, where she filled a casual vacancy in the ANC's caucus.

=== National Council of Provinces: 1999–2009 ===
In the June 1999 general election, Dlulane was elected to a full term in a seat in Parliament's upper house, the National Council of Provinces. She represented the Eastern Cape constituency and was the whip for that province's delegation. She served two terms in the seat, gaining re-election in the April 2004 general election.

=== National Assembly: 2009–2024 ===
In the next general election in April 2009, Dlulane was returned to the National Assembly, where the ANC nominated her to chair the multi-party women's caucus in the fourth democratic Parliament. During this period, Dlulane rose through the ranks of the ANC: in 2012, she was elected for the first time to the National Executive Committee of the ANC Women's League, and later the same year, at the ANC's 53rd National Conference of December 2012, she was elected to a five-year term as a member of the National Executive Committee of the mainstream ANC. By number of votes received, she was ranked 59th of the 80 ordinary members elected at the 53rd National Conference.

She was re-elected to the National Assembly in the May 2014 general election, ranked 54th on the ANC's national party list, and the ANC subsequently named her as its candidate for election as chairperson of the Portfolio Committee on Sport and Recreation, to serve alongside Michael Ralegoma, who would be the party's whip in the committee. She was formally elected to the chairmanship, unopposed, on 24 June 2014. She led the committee throughout the fifth democratic Parliament, and she also attended the ANC's 54th National Conference in December 2017, where she was re-elected to the National Executive Committee, now ranked 68th of 80.

In the May 2019 general election, Dlulane was re-elected to her legislative seat, ranked 83rd on the national party list. After the election, the Portfolio Committee on Sport and Recreation was merged into the new Portfolio Committee on Sports, Arts and Culture, in line with a concomitant expansion in the portfolio of the new Department of Sports, Arts and Culture. The ANC announced that it would nominate Dlulane to chair the new committee, with Nocks Seabi as committee whip, and she was elected unopposed during the committee's inaugural meeting on 2 July 2019. She failed to gain re-election to the ANC National Executive Committee at the party's 55th National Conference in December 2022.

She was not included on any ANC list for the 2024 general election and left parliament at the election.

== Travelgate conviction ==
In August 2004, while Dlulane was serving in the National Council of Provinces, the Scorpions identified Dlulane as one of several legislators suspected of involvement in the Travelgate scandal. She was charged with criminal fraud, and the Cape High Court convicted her on 16 October 2006 after she pled guilty in terms of a plea bargain. She admitted to defrauding Parliament of R289,000 and was sentenced to pay a fine of R120,000; the fine would be paid in instalments, with the last payment due in January 2010.
