= 24th South African Parliament =

Parliament of South Africa, 2004–2009

Makeup of the National Assembly after the election of the 24th Parliament. ANC DA IFP other parties

Makeup of the National Council of Provinces after the election of the 24th Parliament. Colours as above; a lighter shade represents a special delegate's seat.

The 24th South African Parliament was the third Parliament of South Africa to convene since the introduction of non-racial government in South Africa in 1994. It was elected in the 14 April, 2004 general election, and was opened by re-elected president Thabo Mbeki's State of the Nation address in a joint sitting on 21 May 2004. The composition of the parliament was only slightly changed by the 2007 floor crossing window period, with the ANC retaining its majority and the Democratic Alliance retaining its lead of the opposition. It held its final session in February 2009, prior to the April 2009 elections.

== See also ==
- List of National Assembly members of the 24th Parliament of South Africa
- List of NCOP members of the 24th Parliament of South Africa
