= Peter Moatshe =

South African politician

National Council of Provinces

Assembly Member for North West
- In office June 1999 – May 2009

Member of the National Assembly
- In office May 1994 – June 1999

Personal details
- Born: 27 August 1940 (age 85)
- Citizenship: South Africa
- Party: African National Congress

Peter Moatshe (born 27 August 1940) is a retired South African politician and Christian minister. He represented the African National Congress in Parliament from 1994 to 2009. He was a member of the South African Council of Churches during apartheid.

== Legislative career ==
Moatshe was elected to the National Assembly in the 1994 general election, South Africa's first post-apartheid elections. After a single term in the National Assembly, he was elected to the National Council of Provinces after the 1999 general election; he represented the North West Province and served two terms in his seat. During the third democratic Parliament, Moatshe chaired the Select Committee on Land and Environmental Affairs, in which capacity he argued for accelerating land reform in South Africa.
