= Travelgate (South Africa) =

South African scandal

Travelgate was one of the first major political corruption scandals in post-apartheid South Africa. It implicated over 30 Members of Parliament (MPs) as accomplices and beneficiaries in a large-scale fraud scheme, under which Parliament unknowingly recompensed MPs and private travel agencies for millions of rands in fictitious travel expenses. The Sunday Times broke the story in July 2004.

The fraud itself revolved around travel vouchers which MPs were granted for covering work-related air travel expenses. These took the form of travel warrants which MPs could use to pay travel agencies for air tickets; travel agents were able to claim payment from Parliament against the warrants. MPs and travel agents colluded to fill out fraudulent travel warrants and bill Parliament for air tickets that were never purchased (or that had been purchased but cancelled and refunded). The money paid by Parliament was kept by the agencies, who transferred some of it to MPs in the form of cash or bookings for car hire or luxury hotel accommodation. In the latter case, MPs were able to duplicate future expense claims to Parliament, for example by claiming mileage expenses on their vehicles while in fact using hired vehicles paid for by the travel agency.

The Scorpions, an elite unit of the National Prosecuting Authority, initiated a large-scale investigation which involved questioning 135 MPs, and PricewaterhouseCoopers was contracted to assist with forensic accounting. The first criminal charges were laid against MPs in January 2005. By 2010, 31 MPs, and several travel agents, had pled guilty to charges against them; none of the cases went to trial. Several resigned.

== List of criminal convictions ==
The following is a partial list of the MPs who pled guilty of fraud or theft charges in connection with Travelgate. They were sentenced to fines and suspended prison sentences. The majority of the convicted MPs were from the governing African National Congress (ANC), but a handful belonged to the opposition Democratic Alliance (DA) and New National Party (NNP).

Member of Parliament	Party	Conviction	Conviction date	Fine in rands	Citation
Ruth Bhengu	ANC	Fraud	2005/04	R45,000	
Mnyamezeli Booi	ANC	Theft	2009/09	R50,000	
Bathabile Dlamini	ANC	Fraud	2006/10	R120,000	
Beauty Dlulane	ANC	Fraud	2006/10	R120,000	
Ndleleni Duma	ANC	Theft	2006/10	R30,000	
Rhoda Joemat	ANC	Fraud	2005/03	R80,000	
Bruce Kannemeyer	ANC	Theft	2006/10	R40,000	
Tsietsi Louw	ANC	Theft	2006/10	R60,000	
Mavis Magazi	ANC	Fraud	2005/03	R60,000	
Douglas Maimane	ANC	Theft	2006/10	R25,000	
Sophie Maine	ANC	Fraud	2006/10	R100,000	
Nono Maloyi	ANC	Fraud	2006/10	R60,000	
Pamela Mnandi	ANC	Fraud	2005/03	R40,000	
Garth Mngomezulu	ANC	Fraud	2006/10	R100,000	
Lewele Modisenyane	ANC	Theft	2006/10	R25,000	
Angie Molebatsi	ANC	Theft	2006/10	R25,000	
Craig Morkel	DA	Fraud	2006/12	R25,000	
Mildred Mpaka	ANC	Fraud	2005/03	R80,000	
John Ncinane	ANC	Fraud	2005/04	R80,000	
Elizabeth Ngaleka	ANC	Theft	2006/12	R20,000	
Robert Nogumla	ANC	Fraud	2006/10	R90,000	
Danny Oliphant	ANC	Fraud	2006/12	R30,000	
Randy Pieterse	ANC	Theft	2006/10	R25,000	
Charles Redcliffe	DA	Fraud	2006/07	R70,000	
Rodney Rhoda	NNP	Fraud	2005/04	R30,000	
Alice Sigcawu	ANC	Theft	2006/10	R50,000	
Bangilizwe Solo	ANC	Fraud	2006/10	R100,000	
Jabu Sosibo	ANC	Fraud	2006/12	R100,000	
Tseko Taabe	ANC	Fraud	2005/03	R40,000	
Barbara Thomson	ANC	Fraud	2006/10	R90,000	
