= Julius Mongwaketse =

South African politician

Member of the National Assembly
- In office June 1999 – April 2004

Delegate to the National Council of Provinces

Assembly Member for North West
- In office May 1994 – June 1999

Personal details
- Born: Seodi Julius Mongwaketse; 17 January 1956 (age 70)
- Citizenship: South Africa
- Party: African National Congress

Seodi Julius Mongwaketse (born 17 January 1956) is a South African politician and businessman. He represented the African National Congress (ANC) in the National Assembly from 1999 to 2004, narrowly gaining election in 1999. Before that, he was a member of the Northern Cape caucus of the Senate (later the National Council of Provinces) during the first democratic Parliament from 1994 to 1999.

After leaving Parliament in 2004, Mongwaketse pursued a career in business, joining a black economic empowerment mining company called Northern Cape Manganese Company. He was also a member of the Provincial Executive Committee of the ANC's North West branch.
