= Tony Marais =

South African politician (1952–2019)

Member of the Free State Provincial Legislature
- In office 2002–2006

Delegate to the National Council of Provinces

Assembly Member for Free State
- In office 1994–2002

Personal details
- Born: Anthony Marais; 28 August 1952
- Died: 27 January 2019 (aged 66)
- Citizenship: South Africa
- Party: Economic Freedom Fighters (since 2013)
- Other political affiliations: African National Congress
- Spouse: Paulnita Marais
- Children: 6

Anthony Marais (28 August 1952 – 27 January 2019) was a South African politician from the Free State. He represented the African National Congress (ANC) in the Free State Provincial Legislature from 2002 to 2006. Before that, he was a Delegate to the National Council of Provinces from 1994 to 2002. After leaving government, he joined the opposition Economic Freedom Fighters (EFF) in 2013.

== Early life and activism ==
Marais was born on 28 August 1952. According to his wife, he joined the ANC as a teenager and was recruited into Umkhonto we Sizwe. He later chaired the Free State branch of the South African National Civic Organisation.

== Political career ==
In South Africa's first post-apartheid elections in 1994, Marais was elected to represent the ANC in the Orange Free State caucus (later the Free State caucus) of the Senate (later the National Council of Provinces). He was elected to a second term in the 1999 general election.

In 2002, Marais resigned from the national Parliament in order to fill an ANC seat in the Free State Provincial Legislature. He was elected to a full term in the provincial legislature in 2004, but he resigned midway through the term in 2006.

After leaving legislative politics, in 2007, Marais opened an ill-fated printing business with his wife; the company later closed. He joined the EFF in 2013.

== Personal life ==
Marais was retired at the time of his death and lived in Heidedal with his wife, politician Paulnita Marais, with whom he had six children. He died on 27 January 2019.
