= Barbara Thomson =

South African politician (born 1954)

Deputy Minister of Environmental Affairs
- In office 26 May 2014 – 25 May 2019
- President: Jacob Zuma; Cyril Ramaphosa
- Minister: Edna Molewa; Nomvula Mokonyane
- Preceded by: Rejoice Mabudafhasi (for Water and Environmental Affairs)
- Succeeded by: Maggie Sotyu (for Environment, Forestry and Fisheries)

Deputy Minister of Energy
- In office 1 November 2010 – 25 May 2014
- President: Jacob Zuma
- Minister: Dipuo Peters; Ben Martins
- Preceded by: Position established
- Succeeded by: Thembi Majola

Personal details
- Born: 3 February 1954 (age 72) Natal, South Africa
- Party: African National Congress

Barbara Thomson (born 3 February 1954), also spelled Barbara Thompson, is a South African politician. She represented the African National Congress in the South African Parliament between 1995 and 2019. During that time, she served as Deputy Minister of Environmental Affairs from 2014 to 2019 and as Deputy Minister of Energy from 2010 to 2014. In 2006, she was convicted of fraud in the Travelgate scandal.

== Early life and career ==
Thomson was born on 3 February 1954 in the former Natal Province (now KwaZulu-Natal). She trained as a development worker and became involved in politics and community activism in the Natal Midlands, where she later served as secretary of a regional branch of the African National Congress (ANC) Women's League.

== Parliament: 1995–2019 ==
Thomson joined the first democratic Parliament in 1995, filling a casual vacancy. She represented the ANC in Parliament for the next 14 years, serving a stint in the National Council of Provinces as well as longer stints in the National Assembly. In 2004, she was one of several representatives implicated by the Scorpions in the Travelgate scandal, and in October 2006 she pled guilty to having defrauded Parliament in that connection. The fraud reportedly pertained to an amount of R74,000.

On 31 October 2010, President Jacob Zuma announced a major cabinet reshuffle, in which he appointed Thomson as Deputy Minister of Energy; until then, the Minister of Energy, Dipuo Peters, had served without a deputy. Thomson remained in that office until the May 2014 general election, after which Zuma appointed her as Deputy Minister of Environmental Affairs. She left Parliament and the executive at the May 2019 general election.
