= Rhoda Joemat =

South African politician (1947–2019)

Member of the National Assembly
- In office June 1999 – June 2005

Provincial Treasurer of the Western Cape African National Congress
- In office 1998–2001
- Chairperson: Ebrahim Rasool
- Preceded by: Ebrahim Rasool
- Succeeded by: Lynne Brown

Personal details
- Born: 8 August 1947 Cape Town, Cape Province; Union of South Africa
- Died: 30 November 2019 (aged 72) Cape Town, South Africa
- Party: African National Congress

Rhoda Joemat (8 August 1947 – 30 November 2019) was a South African politician who represented the African National Congress (ANC) in the National Assembly from 1999 until 2005, when she was convicted of defrauding Parliament during the Travelgate scandal. A former anti-apartheid activist, she also served as Provincial Treasurer of the ANC's Western Cape branch from 1998 to 2001.

== Early life and career ==
Joemat was born in Cape Town on 8 August 1947. She spent most of her childhood in Caledon, but most of her teenage years in Bridgetown in Athlone. After her marriage she moved to Surrey Estate on the outskirts of Athlone, where she and her husband often sheltered young anti-apartheid activists. She was a bookkeeper by training, as well as a member of the United Democratic Front, the United Women's Congress, and the Cape Areas Housing Action Committee.

== Post-apartheid political career ==
In 1998, Joemat was elected Provincial Treasurer of the ANC's Western Cape branch, serving under Provincial Chairperson Ebrahim Rasool. She remained in that office until 2001, when she did not avail herself for re-election. Simultaneously, from 1999, she served as a Member of the National Assembly, the lower house of the South African Parliament.

In 2005, Joemat was convicted of fraud in connection with the so-called Travelgate scandal. As part of a plea bargain, she pled guilty to defrauding Parliament of R72,000 by exchanging parliamentary air-travel vouchers for cash. On 18 March, she was sentenced to pay a fine of R80,000 or serve eight years' imprisonment, with five years suspended. On 23 June, the ANC announced that Joemat and four others had resigned from Parliament as part of the ANC's zero-tolerance stance on corruption.

Despite her conviction, she remained active in the ANC politics: in June, the Mail & Guardian described her as aligned with James Ngculu in the latter's ongoing succession battle with Rasool, and she was considered to be Ngculu's likely running mate in the upcoming provincial elective conference.

== Personal life and death ==
She was married to Paul Joemat, with whom she had three children – Rowena, Bradley, and Che – and several grandchildren. She was a member of the Moravian Church and at the time of her death, she remained a resident of Surrey Estate.

Joemat died on 30 November 2019 in hospital in Cape Town after suffering a heart attack.
