= Manto Tshabalala-Msimang =

South African politician (1940–2009)

Minister in the Presidency
- In office 25 September 2008 – 10 May 2009
- President: Kgalema Motlanthe
- Preceded by: Position established
- Succeeded by: Trevor Manuel and Collins Chabane

22nd Minister of Health
- In office 17 June 1999 – 25 September 2008
- President: Thabo Mbeki; Kgalema Motlanthe
- Preceded by: Nkosazana Dlamini-Zuma
- Succeeded by: Barbara Hogan

Acting Minister of Communications
- In office 6 April 2009 – 10 May 2009
- President: Kgalema Motlanthe
- Preceded by: Ivy Matsepe-Casaburri
- Succeeded by: Siphiwe Nyanda

Deputy Minister of Justice
- In office 1 July 1996 – 17 June 1999
- President: Nelson Mandela
- Minister: Dullah Omar

Member of the National Assembly of South Africa
- In office 29 April 1994 – 16 December 2009
- Constituency: Durban

Personal details
- Born: Mantombazana Edmie Mali; 9 October 1940 Durban, South Africa
- Died: 16 December 2009 (aged 69) Johannesburg, South Africa
- Party: African National Congress
- Spouses: Mandla Tshabalala (before 2009; div.); Mendi Msimang (until 2009; her death)
- Children: 2
- Occupation: Politician; doctor; legislator; anti-apartheid activist

Mantombazana "Manto" Edmie Tshabalala-Msimang OMSS (née Mali; 9 October 1940 – 16 December 2009) was a South African politician. She was Deputy Minister of Justice from 1996 to 1999 and served as Minister of Health from 1999 to 2008 under President Thabo Mbeki. She also served as Minister in the Presidency under President Kgalema Motlanthe from September 2008 to May 2009.

Her emphasis on treating South Africa's AIDS epidemic with easily accessible vegetables such as African potato, garlic and beetroot, rather than with antiretroviral medicines, was the subject of local and international criticism. These policies led to the deaths of over 300,000 infected South Africans.

== Education ==
Born as Mantombazana Edmie Mali in Durban, Tshabalala-Msimang graduated from Fort Hare University in 1961. As one of a number of young African National Congress cadres sent into exile for education, she received medical training at the First Leningrad Medical Institute in the Soviet Union from 1962 to 1969. She then trained as a registrar in obstetrics and gynaecology in Tanzania, finishing there in 1972. In 1980, she received a master's in public health from the University of Antwerp in Belgium.

She was an official within the exiled ANC leadership in Tanzania and Zambia during the latter decade of apartheid, with job responsibilities focused on the health and well-being of ANC militants there.

== AIDS policies ==
Tshabalala-Msimang's administration as Minister of Health was controversial because of her reluctance to adopt a public sector plan for treating AIDS with anti-retroviral medicines (ARVs). When interviewed by Radio 702 presenter John Robbie in 2000, Tshabalala-Msimang refused to say whether she believed HIV caused AIDS. She was called Dr. Beetroot for promoting the benefits of beetroot, garlic, lemons, and African potatoes as well as good general nutrition, while referring to the possible toxicities of AIDS medicines. She was widely seen as following an AIDS policy in line with the ideas of South African President Thabo Mbeki, who for a time publicly expressed doubts about whether HIV caused AIDS.

In 2002, the South African Cabinet affirmed the policy that "HIV causes AIDS", which, as an official statement, silenced any further speculation on this topic by Cabinet members, including the President. In August 2003, the cabinet also voted to make anti-retrovirals available in the public sector and instructed Tshabalala-Msimang to carry out the policy.

The Treatment Action Campaign (TAC) and its founder Zackie Achmat often targeted the minister for criticism, accusing the government and the Ministry of Health in particular of an inadequate response to the AIDS epidemic. The TAC led a campaign calling for her resignation or dismissal.

The TAC accused Tshabalala-Msimang of being aligned with Matthias Rath, a German physician and vitamin entrepreneur, who had charges laid against him for discouraging the use of ARVs.

Tshabalala-Msimang placed her emphasis on broad public health goals, seeing AIDS as only one aspect of that effort and one which, because of the incurable nature of HIV and the financial costs of HIV treatment, might impede broader efforts to improve public health. A report making the case that AIDS is such a burden on the public health system that treating it would actually free up costs was sent back for clarification and not released in the summer of 2003, until it was obtained and leaked by TAC. After the cabinet vote to accept the findings of this report, Tshabalala-Msimang was in charge of the ARV roll-out, but continued to emphasise the importance of nutrition in AIDS and to urge others to see AIDS as only one problem among many in South African health.

A case that attracted much public attention was Nozipho Bhengu, daughter of an African National Congress legislator, who rejected anti-retroviral treatments for AIDS in favour of Tshabalala-Msimang's garlic and lemon diet. The minister declined to attend her funeral, and her stand-in was booed off the podium.

In February 2005, the Congress of South African Trade Unions (COSATU) criticised the health department for its failure to ensure that most of the 30 million rand used to establish the government's AIDS trust in 2002 had been spent. They said only R520,000 of this money was used and of this a large portion had been squandered on unoccupied offices for the SANAC secretariat, something that drew criticism from the auditor-general.

In August 2006, at the International AIDS Conference in Toronto, Stephen Lewis, the United Nations special envoy for AIDS in Africa, closed the conference with a sharp critique of South Africa's government. He said South Africa promoted a "lunatic fringe" attitude toward HIV and AIDS, describing the government as "obtuse, dilatory, and negligent about rolling out treatment". After the conference, sixty-five of the world's leading HIV/AIDS scientists (most of them were attending the conference) asked in a letter that Thabo Mbeki dismiss Tshabalala-Msimang.

== Traditional medicines ==
At a meeting with traditional healers to discuss future legislation in February 2008, Tshabalala-Msimang argued that traditional remedies should not become "bogged down" in clinical trials, also saying, "We cannot use Western models of protocols for research and development".

In September 2008, Tshabalala-Msimang called for greater protection of the intellectual rights of Africa's traditional medicines. Speaking at the 6th commemoration of The African Traditional Medicine Day in Cameroon's capital of Yaoundé, she said that the continent should benefit more from its ancient traditional knowledge.

== Personal ==
Tshabalala-Msimang married her first husband, Mandla Tshabalala, while both were in exile in the Soviet Union. Later she married Mendi Msimang, the treasurer of the African National Congress. She had two daughters from her first marriage, one of whom was married to investment banker Martin Kingston.

Concern over Tshabalala-Msimang's health came to the fore in late 2006. She was admitted to the Johannesburg Hospital on 20 February 2007, suffering from anaemia and pleural effusion (an abnormal accumulation of fluid around the lungs). The Department of Health approached President Thabo Mbeki, and asked him to appoint an acting minister, and on 26 February Jeff Radebe was appointed acting health minister. On 14 March 2007, Tshabalala-Msimang underwent a liver transplant. The stated cause was autoimmune hepatitis with portal hypertension, but the transplant was surrounded by accusations of heavy drinking. She subsequently recovered her health and returned to her Ministerial duties until her replacement as health minister in 2008.

On 16 December 2009, she died due to complications related to her liver transplant.

== Scandal ==
On 12 August 2007, four days after the controversial dismissal of her deputy minister, Nozizwe Madlala-Routledge, the Sunday Times ran an article titled "Manto's hospital booze binge" about a previous hospital stay in 2005 for a shoulder operation. The article alleged that she sent hospital workers out to fetch wine, whisky and food items, in one case at 1:30 am. Tshabalala-Msimang threatened legal action against the newspaper on the grounds that they were in possession of her medical records. The paper defended its statements, stating that "a retraction was not under consideration". The article also reported speculation among "many top medical experts at state and private institutions, who refused to be named as they feared retribution from the health ministry" that her liver condition was alcohol-induced cirrhosis.

According to a Sunday Times article titled "Manto: A Drunk and a Thief" published on 19 August 2007, the minister was a convicted thief who had stolen patient items at a hospital in Botswana, and had been deported from Botswana and declared a prohibited immigrant.

== ANC politics and replacement as Health Minister ==
With the endorsement of Jacob Zuma's supporters, Tshabalala-Msimang was re-elected to the ANC's 80-member National Executive Committee in December 2007 in 55th place, with 1,591 votes.

Mbeki was forced to resign by the ANC in September 2008. When his successor, Kgalema Motlanthe, took office on 25 September 2008, he moved Tshabalala-Msimang to the post of Minister in the Presidency, appointing Barbara Hogan to replace her as Minister of Health.

Tshabalala-Msimang was not included in the first Cabinet of President Zuma, announced on 10 May 2009.

== Death ==
Tshabalala-Msimang died on 16 December 2009 at the Wits University Donald Gordon Medical Centre and Medi-Clinic ICU. Her doctor, Professor Jeff Wing, announced that she died due to complications arising from a liver transplant.

== See also ==
- HIV/AIDS in Africa
- Nozizwe Madlala-Routledge
- South African Department of Health
- List of members of the National Assembly of South Africa who died in office
