= Mohseen Moosa =

South African businessman and former politician

Delegate to the National Council of Provinces

Assembly Member for Gauteng
- In office May 1994 – January 2003

Personal details
- Born: Johannesburg
- Citizenship: South Africa
- Party: African National Congress
- Relations: Valli Moosa (brother)

Mohseen Valli Moosa (also known as Mohseen Wally Moosa) is a South African lawyer, businessman and former politician who represented the African National Congress (ANC) in the Senate and National Council of Provinces (NCOP) from 1994 to 2003. He resigned from Parliament in January 2003 to pursue business interests in the mining and wine industries.

== Early life and career ==
Moosa was born in Johannesburg and formerly practiced as an attorney. He is the brother of Valli Moosa, a former anti-apartheid activist who was a cabinet minister under Presidents Nelson Mandela and Thabo Mbeki.

== Legislative career ==
In South Africa's first post-apartheid elections in 1994, Moosa was elected to represent the ANC in the Senate, the upper house of the new South African Parliament; he served the PWV constituency (a precursor to the Gauteng constituency). He remained in his seat after the Senate was restructured as the NCOP under the 1996 Constitution.

During his first term in the seat, Moosa chaired the NCOP's Select Committee on Security and Justice, and in 1999 he was elected to chair the ad hoc committee which processed the landmark Equality Bill. He later chaired the Select Committee on Minerals and Energy, which, during his tenure, processed the controversial Mineral and Petroleum Resources Development Bill. As of 2002, he was also the chairman of the ANC's internal electoral task team. He was chairman of the NCOP's Select Committee on Economic Affairs in January 2003 when he resigned from Parliament and from politics to pursue a career in business.

== Business career ==
=== African Romance ===
In November 2007, Moosa founded African Romance, a South African diamond beneficiation company. He was its chief executive officer until January 2013, when it ceased operating and resolved to liquidate. Moosa blamed the company's failure on upstream and downstream deficiencies, including on the part of the State Diamond Trader.

During its lifetime, the company received attention because of its receipt of state support: it received R97 million in funding from the state-owned Industrial Development Corporation and, more controversially, a further R55-million from Gauteng's provincial Department of Economic Development. The department, then led by Paul Mashatile, had guaranteed a loan between the company and ABSA bank, on which the company had subsequently defaulted; the department had paid R50 million to settle the loan, parlayed as an investment in preference shares, and at the same time had extended an addition R5 million "to provide additional funding and support to the company in order to support its immediate needs until the restructuring is complete". The Auditor-General said that the spending amounted to irregular, fruitless and wasteful expenditure in terms of the Public Finance Management Act; both the department and Moosa agreed with this assessment.

=== Wine industry ===
Moosa also entered the wine industry.
