= Geoffrey Bhengu =

South African politician (born 1940) (death 2012)

Member of the National Assembly
- In office June 1999 – August 2002
- Constituency: KwaZulu-Natal

Delegate to the National Council of Provinces

Assembly Member for KwaZulu-Natal
- In office May 1994 – June 1999

Personal details
- Born: Geoffrey Bongumusa Bhengu; 25 August 1940 (age 85) Death date 2012/05/20
- Citizenship: South Africa
- Party: Inkatha Freedom Party

Geoffrey Bongumusa Bhengu (born 25 August 1940 -died 20 May 2012) is a South African politician from KwaZulu-Natal. He represented the Inkatha Freedom Party (IFP) in the national Parliament from May 1994 until August 2002, when moved to the KwaZulu-Natal Legislature.

== Legislative career ==
In South Africa's first post-apartheid elections in 1994, Bhengu was elected to represent the IFP in the Senate (later the National Council of Provinces), serving the KwaZulu-Natal constituency. In the next general election in 1999, he was elected to an IFP seat in the National Assembly, again from the KwaZulu-Natal list.

However, midway through the term, the Mail & Guardian reported that Bhengu was likely to be transferred to the KwaZulu-Natal Legislature, where the IFP hoped to stack its seats with party loyalists in order to minimise the losses of the upcoming floor-crossing window. Bhengu was indeed sworn in to the KwaZulu-Natal Legislature on 13 August 2002. He was re-elected to a full term in the provincial legislature in the 2004 general election.
