= Nana Mnandi =

South African politician (born 1959)

Member of the National Assembly
- In office June 1999 – 1 August 2005

Personal details
- Born: 25 July 1959 (age 66)
- Citizenship: South Africa
- Party: African National Congress

Pamella "Nana" Mnandi (born 25 July 1959) is a South African politician from KwaZulu-Natal. She represented the African National Congress (ANC) in the National Assembly from 1999 until 2005, when she resigned. Her resignation followed her conviction on a fraud charge in the Travelgate scandal.

== Early life and activism ==
Mnandi was born on 25 July 1959 and is from present-day KwaZulu-Natal, formerly the Natal Province. During apartheid, she was active in the women's movement in the Natal Midlands, including as a leader of the influential Midland Women's Group in the 1980s.

== Legislative career: 1999–2005 ==
Mnandi was elected to the National Assembly in the 1999 general election and gained re-election in 2004. In March 2005, she was one of the first five MPs to be convicted of defrauding Parliament in the Travelgate scandal. As part of a plea bargain, she pled guilty to fraud in connection with an amount of R34,000 and was sentenced to pay a fine of R40,000 or serve one year in prison. She was also given a mandatory three-year prison sentence suspended conditionally for five years.

In June 2005, the ANC announced that Mnandi and four others would resign from Parliament due to their involvement in the Travelgate scandal. She officially left her seat on 1 August and was replaced by Sello Dithebe.

== Later career ==
In the 2006 local elections, Mnandi was listed as an ANC candidate for election as a local councillor in KwaZulu-Natal's Umgungundlovu District Municipality. Her nomination attracted criticism, given her recent fraud conviction. Weeks after the election, Mnandi was jailed for having failed to pay the court-imposed fine.

In 2011, she was a leading figure in major protests against Alpha Shelembe and other ANC leaders in Pietermaritzburg. As of 2013, she was employed in the KwaZulu-Natal Provincial Legislature.
