= Nozipho Bhengu =

South African Woman Died from AIDS-related Illness

- Born: 1974
- Died: 2006 (aged 31–32)
- Citizenship: South Africa
- Occupation: Writer

Nozipho Bhengu (1974 – 19 May 2006) was a South African woman whose death from an AIDS-related illness intensified the controversy about how AIDS is treated in South Africa. Nozipho was well known in South Africa for her openness about her illness as well as her refusal to take conventional medical treatment for AIDS in favour of alternative and controversial natural treatment.

Diagnosed as HIV positive in 1998, Nozipho Bhengu underwent treatment using antiretroviral drugs until 2001. At that point she was persuaded by health minister Manto Tshabalala-Msimang and nutritionalist Tine van der Maas that standard pharmaceutical drugs have dangerous side effects and it would be more beneficial to her condition to try a controversial lemon and garlic diet. The health minister was quoted in saying "I do not know of any side effects of eating proper food". Bhengu's mother, Ruth Bhengu, as an African National Congress legislator spoke of her daughter's beliefs in a speech in Parliament. After the speech Nozipho Bhengu's efforts to treat her illness became common knowledge in South Africa.

Bhengu died on 19 May 2006. At the time of her death she was working on a book, From Victim to Victor, which detailed her experience that was left unfinished. Upon her death the Treatment Action Campaign praised her openness about her illness while at the same time calling her death "unnecessary".

Manto Tshabalala-Msimang was invited to her funeral on 24 May. She sent a representative who was subsequently booed by some of the funeral's attendees.
