= Gregory Krumbock =

South African politician

Gregory Rudy Krumbock MP
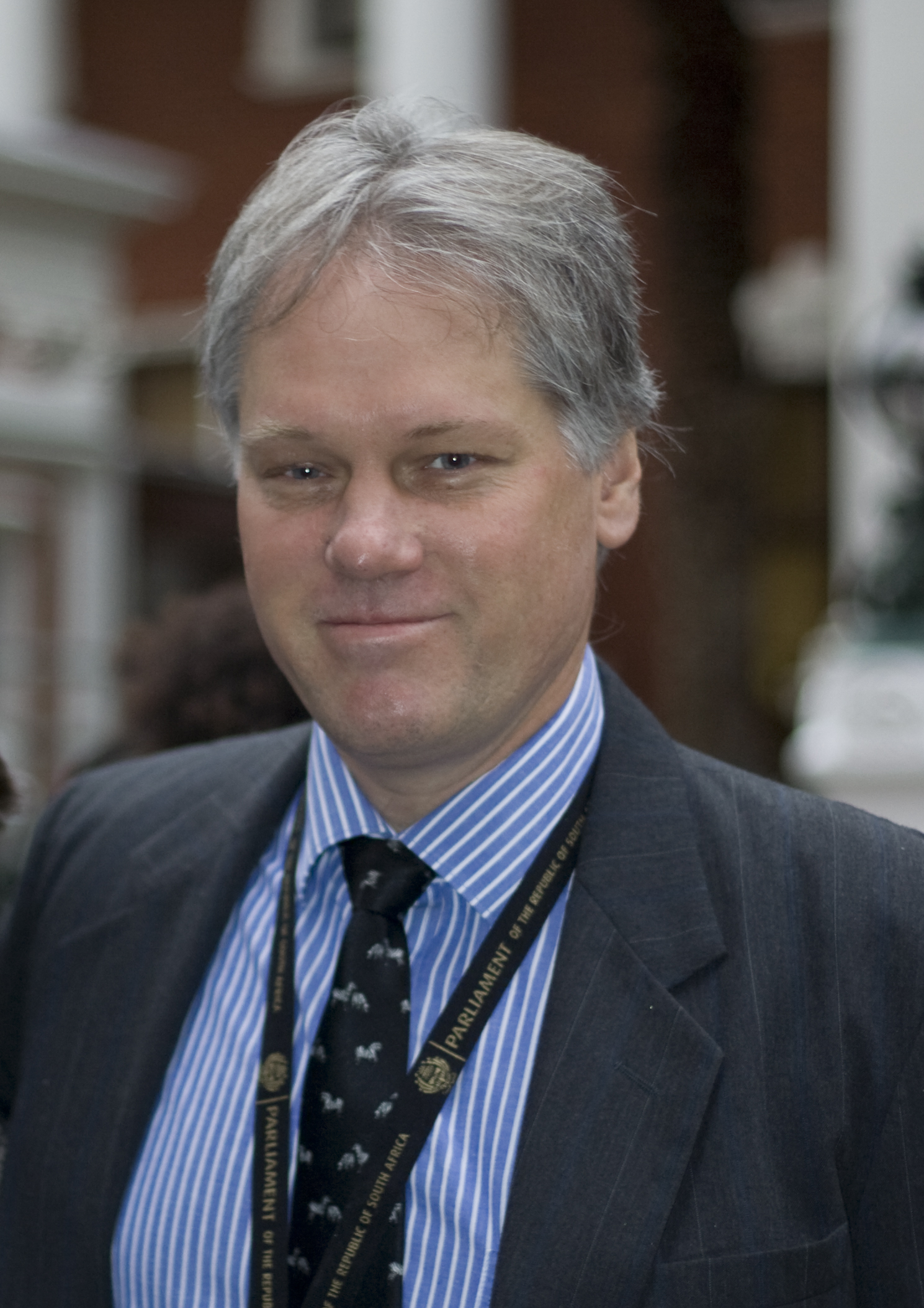

Shadow Minister of Tourism
- In office 2009–2012
- Leader: Helen Zille
- Succeeded by: Stuart Farrow

Member of Parliament for uMgungundlovu West, KwaZulu-Natal
- Incumbent
- Assumed office 6 May 2009

Personal details
- Born: Gregory Rudy Krumbock; 17 July 1960 (age 66) West Berlin, West Germany
- Party: Democratic Alliance
- Education: University of Cape Town

Gregory Rudy Krumbock was a South African politician. He was a Member of Parliament with the Democratic Alliance (DA). He held the position of Shadow Minister of Tourism from 2009 to 2012.

== Background ==
Gregory Krumbock was born in West Berlin on 17 July 1960. When he was three months old, he arrived in South Africa and was educated at the South African College Schools (SACS) in Cape Town. Later, Krumbock enrolled at the University of Cape Town (UCT), where he achieved a BComm degree.

Krumbock moved to KwaZulu-Natal (KZN) in 1986 and worked as a financial manager for two local companies in the fencing and construction industries before leaving in 1992 to start his own business ventures, where he completed a number of developments in the KZN Midlands area. On 1 March 1998 he accepted an offer from the then leader of the Democratic Party, Tony Leon, to take up the role of executive director, specifically charged with the organizational aspects of the DP's 1999 general election campaign.

Krumbock has been noted as one of the top 25 politicians to follow on Facebook and Twitter. Krumbock is in eighth place, one place behind Gareth Morgan, another South African politician with the DA.

== Parliamentarian ==
Krumbock's political career began in the mid-1970s, when he joined the Progressive Federal Party (PFP) Youth and was a member of the Wynberg Constituency and alternate delegate to the Western Cape Regional Council. He worked as a volunteer in the Durbanville by-election which occurred at that point. He continued his role as a youth member, and was later elected as the KZN Midlands representative to the National Executive of the PFP Youth. He remained a volunteer working in various by-elections and national elections in the Western Cape, and then KZN, where he was prominent in the Maritzburg constituencies in the 1987 and 1989 General Elections.

In the lead-up to the first democratic elections in South Africa, he was elected chairperson of fundraising for the Midlands Region and before the end of the campaign to provincial chairperson of fundraising. Shortly after the 1994 elections he was elected for several terms as Midlands Regional Chairperson until he was appointed executive director in 1998 ending 22 years of volunteer activism.

He was first elected to Parliament in 1999, representing Mpumalanga and subsequently represented KZN in 2004 and now 2009 in his third term. He is currently serving his third term unopposed as KZN Provincial Chairperson and consultant to the CEO on election and operational matters.
