= Nosipho Ntwanambi =

South African politician and social activist (1959–2014)

Chief Whip of the National Council of Provinces
- In office 2008–2014

Member of the National Council of Provinces
- In office 1999–2014

Deputy President of the African National Congress Women's League
- In office 2008–2014

Personal details
- Born: Nosipho Dorothy Ntwanambi; 25 September 1959 Gugulethu, Western Cape, South Africa
- Died: 8 July 2014 (aged 54) Gugulethu, Western Cape, South Africa
- Party: African National Congress
- Occupation: Politician, teacher, activist

Nosipho Dorothy Ntwanambi (25 September 1959 – 8 July 2014) was a South African politician, as well as a women's and human rights activist.

== Career ==
She was a member of the African National Congress (ANC). She was a teacher at a school in Gugulethu (Siyazingisa primary school) from 1982 until she became a member of Parliament of South Africa in 1997 serving in various select committees in the National Council of Provinces. Ntwanambi was the ANC's Chief Whip in the National Council of Provinces, the first woman to become chief whip, a position she held until she stepped down in 2014. She served as a member of the National Council of Provinces, the upper house of the Parliament of South Africa, from 2008 until 2014. Ntwanambi was also serving as a deputy president of the African National Congress Women's League (ANCWL) at the time of her death.

Ntwanambi was a founding member of both the South African Democratic Teachers Union (SADTU) and the United Women's Organisation (UWO). She was also a member of the ANC's National Executive Committee.

== Death ==
Nosipho Ntwanambi died following a long illness on 8 July 2014, at the age of 54, Leaving behind her mother, 2 sisters, brother, 2 daughters and 2 grandchildren.

== See also ==
- List of members of the National Assembly of South Africa who died in office
