= Zintle Ndlazi =

South African politician

Member of the National Assembly
- In office 18 October 2010 – 6 May 2014
- In office 15 August 2007 – May 2009

Personal details
- Born: 4 April 1955 (age 71)
- Citizenship: South Africa
- Party: African National Congress (since September 2007)
- Other political affiliations: United Independent Front (until September 2007)

Zintle Alexia Ndlazi (born 4 April 1955) is a South African politician who served in the National Assembly for two partial terms from 2007 to 2009 and from 2010 to 2014. She joined Parliament as a member of the United Independent Front (UIF) in August 2007 but crossed the floor to the African National Congress (ANC) a month later.

== Legislative career ==
Ndlazi was born on 4 April 1955. She was a member of the UIF, a party formed in 2005 as a breakaway from the United Democratic Movement. She first joined the National Assembly on 15 August 2007, when she was sworn in to fill the seat of Malizole Diko, the UIF's later leader. On 12 September 2007, during the floor-crossing window and less than a month after she was sworn in to her seat, Ndlazi announced that she would join the UIF's only other MP, Nomakhaya Mdaka, in defecting from the UIF to the governing ANC. The UIF described the decision as "politically stage-managed melodramatic grandstanding" and said that floor-crossing "exposes people for what they are, and... rids the party of political ashes".

Ndlazi left Parliament after the 2009 general election. However, on 18 October 2010, she returned for another partial term after the ANC nominated her to fill Mighty Madasa's seat. She vacated the seat again after the 2014 general election.
