= Vincent Ngema =

South African politician

Member of the National Assembly
- In office August 2002 – January 2009
- Constituency: KwaZulu-Natal

Personal details
- Born: Mzikayise Vincent Ngema; 17 July 1950 (age 75)
- Citizenship: South Africa
- Party: National Democratic Convention (since 2005)
- Other political affiliations: Inkatha Freedom Party (until 2005)

Mzikayise Vincent Ngema (born 17 July 1950) is a South African politician who served in the National Assembly from 2002 to 2009. He was elected as a member of the Inkatha Freedom Party (IFP) but crossed the floor to the National Democratic Convention (Nadeco) in September 2005. He was elected as secretary-general of Nadeco in April 2007.

== Legislative career ==
=== Inkatha Freedom Party ===
Ngema was elected to an IFP seat in the KwaZulu-Natal Legislature in the 1999 general election, but the IFP transferred him and two others to the National Assembly in August 2002. Observers assumed that their transfers were part of the IFP's strategy to ensure that only its most loyal members were assigned to the provincial legislature, where the party was in danger of losing its majority.

Ngema was elected to a full term in the National Assembly in the 2004 general election, representing the KwaZulu-Natal constituency. After the election, President Thabo Mbeki invited Ngema to join his government as Deputy Minister of Sport and Recreation. However, Ngema and Musa Zondi, another IFP politician offered a deputy ministerial position, told Mbeki that they could not accept the invitation until the IFP had discussed the nature of its relationship with Mbeki's party, the African National Congress; in response, Mbeki said that he would select other appointees who were "willing to take the oath and willing to work".

=== National Democratic Convention ===
During the floor-crossing window of September 2005, Ngema joined three other IFP representatives – Makhosazana Mdlalose, Gavin Woods, and Chris Ngiba – in defecting to Nadeco, a party newly founded by former IFP member Ziba Jiyane. The group said that they had left the IFP once it had become clear that there would be a purge in the party to remove those believed to be disloyal to the IFP.

In August 2006, Jiyane announced that Ngema and Ngiba had been suspended from Nadeco pending a disciplinary hearing, amid an apparent power struggle. Nonetheless, in April 2007, at the same party conference which ousted Jiyane from the leadership, Ngema was elected as the party's national secretary-general. In the 2009 general election, Ngema stood for re-election to the National Assembly, ranked second on Nadeco's national party list, but Nadeco did not win any seats and subsequently faded into obscurity.
