= Chris Ngiba =

South African politician

Member of the National Assembly
- In office March 2003 – January 2009
- Constituency: KwaZulu-Natal

Personal details
- Born: Bonginkosi Christopher Ngiba; 22 October 1951 (age 74)
- Citizenship: South Africa
- Party: Congress of the People (since 2009)
- Other political affiliations: National Democratic Convention (2005–2009); Inkatha Freedom Party (until 2005)

Bonginkosi Christopher Ngiba (born 22 October 1951) is a South African politician who represented the KwaZulu-Natal constituency in the National Assembly from 2003 to 2009. He was elected as a member of the Inkatha Freedom Party (IFP) but crossed the floor to the National Democratic Convention (Nadeco) in September 2005. Near the end of the legislative term, in January 2009, he resigned from his seat and defected to the Congress of the People.

== Legislative career ==
=== Inkatha Freedom Party ===
Ngiba was the chairperson of the KwaZulu-Natal Taxi Council and was regarded as close to S'bu Ndebele of the governing African National Congress, with whom he cooperated in attempting to mitigate taxi violence in KwaZulu-Natal. He represented the IFP in the KwaZulu-Natal Legislature until March 2003, when the IFP announced that he and several others were to be transferred to the National Assembly. While the party said that its aim was to reinforce its administrative capacity ahead of the 2004 general election, it was widely assumed that its immediate motive was to protect its plurality in the KwaZulu-Natal Legislature by removing legislators who were suspected of planning to cross the floor.

=== National Democratic Convention ===
In the 2004 general election, Ngiba was elected to a full term in the National Assembly, representing the KwaZulu-Natal constituency. However, during the floor-crossing window of September 2005, he was among a group of four IFP representatives – also including Makhosazana Mdlalose, Gavin Woods, and Vincent Ngema – who defected to Nadeco, a party newly founded by former IFP member Ziba Jiyane. The group said that they had left the IFP once it had become clear that there would be a purge in the party to remove those believed to be disloyal to the IFP.

In August 2006, Ngiba and Ngema were suspended from Nadeco pending a disciplinary hearing, in an apparent power struggle: after Jiyane announced their suspension, another group of senior Nadeco leaders announced that Jiyane would in turn be suspended for overstepping his authority, and Jiyane then said that those leaders would themselves be expelled. Nonetheless, Ngiba continued to represent the party in the National Assembly, and as chairman of its KwaZulu-Natal branch, until January 2009, when he announced that he had resigned from the party – and therefore from Parliament – in order to join the Congress of the People.
