= Craig Morkel =

South African politician and businessman (born 1967)

Member of the National Assembly
- In office June 1999 – May 2009
- Constituency: Western Cape

Personal details
- Born: Craig Mervyn Morkel; 10 November 1967 (age 58)
- Citizenship: South Africa
- Party: African National Congress (since September 2007)
- Other political affiliations: Progressive Independent Movement (2005–7); Democratic Alliance (2003–5); New National Party (until 2003)
- Relations: Kent Morkel (brother)
- Parent: Gerald Morkel

Craig Mervyn Morkel (born 10 November 1967) is a South African businessman and former politician. He served in the National Assembly from 1999 to 2009, representing the Western Cape constituency, before embarking on his career in business. In 2006, he was convicted of defrauding Parliament in the Travelgate scandal.

Labelled a "serial floor-crosser", Morkel represented four different parties during his decade in Parliament, taking advantage of each of the three floor-crossing windows that took place during that period. He entered the National Assembly as a member of the New National Party before he crossed to the Democratic Alliance in March 2003; formed his own party, the Progressive Independent Movement, in September 2005; and finally crossed to the African National Congress in September 2007.

== Early life and family ==
Morkel was born on 10 November 1967 and was designated as Coloured under apartheid. His father, Gerald Morkel, represented the Labour Party in the apartheid-era House of Representatives but joined the National Party, later restyled as the New National Party (NNP), during the democratic transition. One of his brothers, Kent, is also a politician, and another, Garth, is a government official.

== Legislative career ==
=== New National Party: 1999–2003 ===
Morkel joined the National Assembly in the 1999 general election as a representative of the NNP in the Western Cape constituency. Midway through the term, in 2001, Morkel's father fell out with the NNP over the NNP's withdrawal from the multi-party Democratic Alliance (DA) that it had formed the previous year with the Democratic Party (DP). In November of that year, his father resigned from the NNP and as Premier of the Western Cape in order to defect to the DA. Though Morkel said that he did not yet have plans to follow his father to the DA, observers expected him to do so.

=== Democratic Alliance: 2003–2005 ===
In March 2003, during the first floor-crossing window, Morkel indeed resigned from NNP and joined a contingent of his colleagues, led by Sheila Camerer, in registering as a DA member. He served the rest of the legislative term under the DA's banner. The defection greatly increased the public profile of Morkel, who had been "barely visible" as an NNP member. In the 2004 general election, he was highly ranked on the DA's provincial party list for the Western Cape, and he secured re-election to his seat. During this period, he was viewed as a member of the DA's "old NNP camp", largely comprising former NNP and Labour Party members and de facto led by Morkel's father, in opposition to another camp largely comprising former DP members.

==== Travelgate ====
In August 2004, shortly after Morkel's election to a second term, the Scorpions announced that he was among the many MPs under investigation for possible abuse of parliamentary air-travel vouchers, in what became known as the Travelgate scandal. Later the same month, Morkel became the only MP to publicly acknowledge that he had signed an acknowledgement of debt with one of the travel agencies involved in the scandal; he said that he would repay about R33,000 to ITC Travel.

Similarly, in January 2005, when the Scorpions announced that 40 MPs would face criminal charges for their role in Travelgate, Morkel stepped forward to identify himself as one of them. Media reports suggested that Morkel, while an NNP representative, had allowed friends to use his parliamentary travel vouchers – which were supposed to be used only to cover work expenses – and had used other vouchers to hire an Audi TT. The DA announced that Morkel had offered to accept a suspension from all parliamentary and party business, pending the outcome of the trial, although the Mail & Guardian noted that the party continued to list Morkel as its spokesman on youth affairs.

In December 2006, Morkel accepted a plea bargain with the Scorpions; he was sentenced to pay a fine of R25,000 or serve three years' imprisonment. He and other convicted MPs received a formal reprimand from the Speaker of the National Assembly, Baleka Mbete, the following year.

=== Progressive Independent Movement: 2005–2007 ===
While Morkel's criminal charges were still pending, the second floor-crossing window was held in September 2005, and Morkel resigned from the DA to form his own party, the Progressive Independent Movement (PIM). He was the party's sole representative. He said that he would not return to the DA until its leadership changed, though he hoped that the party would become a platform to lobby for change in his former party DA:

It is my way of registering a conscientious objection to the leadership style and organisational culture that presently dominates the DA. I hope after leadership of the DA has changed to go back to my political home.

The Mail & Guardian suggested that Morkel had "outsmarted" the DA, since the Travelgate scandal had weakened his position in the party and would likely have led to his expulsion if he was convicted. The DA launched an unsuccessful court challenge in an attempt to block his move.

=== African National Congress: 2007–2009 ===
During the September 2007 floor-crossing window, Morkel announced that he had resigned from the PIM – which thus became effectively defunct – in order to join the governing African National Congress (ANC). His brother, Kent, had recently announced his own defection from the DA to the ANC, and their brother Garth was apparently a longstanding ANC member, leading the Mail & Guardian to quip that the ANC "has at last secured a clear two-thirds majority in the Morkel family". The newspaper suspected that Morkel had decided to leave the PIM because, in the minor party, "he stood no chance at all of being re-elected at the next general election in 2009". However, even as an ANC member, Morkel left the National Assembly after the 2009 election.

== Later career ==
After 2009, Morkel worked as a business consultant, advising multinational companies on energy deals. In 2014, he founded iKapa Energy with his father, who died in 2018.
