= Inkosi uMtubatuba Local Municipality elections =

Local electoral process in a South African municipality

The Inkosi uMtubatuba Local Municipality council consists of forty-five members elected by mixed-member proportional representation. Twenty-three councillors are elected by first-past-the-post voting in twenty-three wards, while the remaining twenty-two are chosen from party lists so that the total number of party representatives is proportional to the number of votes received.

In the election of 4 November 2026 no party obtained a majority. The Inkatha Freedom Party (IFP) received the most seats with eighteen.

== Results ==
The following table shows the composition of the council after past elections.

Event	AIC	ANC	DA	EFF	IFP	NFP	MKP	Other	Total
2000 election	—	2	1	—	7	—	—	0	10
2006 election	—	4	0	—	5	—	—	1	10
2011 election	—	16	0	—	15	7	—	0	38
2016 election	1	18	2	1	18	—	—	0	40
2021 election	1	16	1	4	19	1	—	3	45
2026 election	0	9	1	2	18	0	10	5	45

== December 2000 election ==
The following table shows the results of the 2000 election.

Party	Ward			List			Total seats
Party	Votes	%	Seats	Votes	%	Seats	Total seats
Inkatha Freedom Party	3,222	66.08	5	3,244	66.48	2	7
African National Congress	911	18.68	0	920	18.85	2	2
Democratic Alliance	589	12.08	0	604	12.38	1	1
African Christian Democratic Party	90	1.85	0	112	2.30	0	0
Independent candidates	64	1.31	0				0
Total	4,876	100.00	5	4,880	100.00	5	10
Valid votes	4,876	97.95		4,880	98.03		
Invalid/blank votes	102	2.05		98	1.97		
Total votes	4,978	100.00		4,978	100.00		
Registered voters/turnout	13,768	36.16		13,768	36.16		

== March 2006 election ==
The following table shows the results of the 2006 election.

Party	Ward			List			Total seats
Party	Votes	%	Seats	Votes	%	Seats	Total seats
Inkatha Freedom Party	3,469	49.35	4	3,464	49.23	1	5
African National Congress	2,545	36.20	1	2,627	37.33	3	4
National Democratic Convention	501	7.13	0	479	6.81	1	1
Democratic Alliance	369	5.25	0	467	6.64	0	0
Independent candidates	146	2.08	0				0
Total	7,030	100.00	5	7,037	100.00	5	10
Valid votes	7,030	97.27		7,037	97.36		
Invalid/blank votes	197	2.73		191	2.64		
Total votes	7,227	100.00		7,228	100.00		
Registered voters/turnout	17,431	41.46		17,431	41.47		

== May 2011 election ==
The following table shows the results of the 2011 election.

Party	Ward			List			Total seats
Party	Votes	%	Seats	Votes	%	Seats	Total seats
African National Congress	17,476	40.59	10	17,718	41.14	6	16
Inkatha Freedom Party	17,290	40.15	9	17,057	39.60	6	15
National Freedom Party	7,554	17.54	0	7,204	16.73	7	7
Democratic Alliance	83	0.19	0	790	1.83	0	0
South African Democratic Congress	324	0.75	0	186	0.43	0	0
Independent candidates	227	0.53	0				0
African Christian Democratic Party	105	0.24	0	114	0.26	0	0
Total	43,059	100.00	19	43,069	100.00	19	38
Valid votes	43,059	98.33		43,069	98.47		
Invalid/blank votes	730	1.67		669	1.53		
Total votes	43,789	100.00		43,738	100.00		
Registered voters/turnout	73,367	59.68		73,367	59.62		

== August 2016 election ==
The following table shows the results of the 2016 election.

Party	Ward			List			Total seats
Party	Votes	%	Seats	Votes	%	Seats	Total seats
Inkatha Freedom Party	24,558	44.63	10	24,812	45.08	8	18
African National Congress	24,180	43.94	10	24,219	44.01	8	18
Democratic Alliance	2,118	3.85	0	2,089	3.80	2	2
Economic Freedom Fighters	1,969	3.58	0	1,964	3.57	1	1
African Independent Congress	1,237	2.25	0	1,769	3.21	1	1
Independent candidates	962	1.75	0				0
Peoples Alliance	1	0.00	0	181	0.33	0	0
Total	55,025	100.00	20	55,034	100.00	20	40
Valid votes	55,025	97.57		55,034	97.31		
Invalid/blank votes	1,368	2.43		1,522	2.69		
Total votes	56,393	100.00		56,556	100.00		
Registered voters/turnout	90,718	62.16		90,718	62.34		

=== August 2016 to November 2021 by-elections ===
In a by-election held on 23 May 2018, a ward previously held by an ANC councillor was won by the IFP candidate. In another by-election held on 12 December 2018, ANC was able to win a ward previously held by the IFP. IFP won a second ward previously held by ANC in another by-election on 12 June 2019. Ward council composition after the three by-elections is as seen below.

Party	Ward	PR list	Total
Inkatha Freedom Party	11	8	19
African National Congress	9	8	17
DA	0	2	2
AIC	0	1	1
Economic Freedom Fighters	0	1	1
Total	20	20	40

== November 2021 election ==
Following the election, an IFP-led executive was elected on 3 February 2022.

The following table shows the results of the 2021 election.

Party	Ward			List			Total seats
Party	Votes	%	Seats	Votes	%	Seats	Total seats
Inkatha Freedom Party	23,138	40.72	15	25,053	44.16	4	19
African National Congress	19,903	35.03	7	20,949	36.92	9	16
Economic Freedom Fighters	5,148	9.06	0	5,146	9.07	4	4
Independent candidates	3,202	5.63	1				1
African Christian Democratic Party	1,192	2.10	0	1,263	2.23	1	1
Democratic Alliance	1,065	1.87	0	1,119	1.97	1	1
African Independent Congress	656	1.15	0	588	1.04	1	1
United Democratic Movement	533	0.94	0	531	0.94	1	1
National Freedom Party	493	0.87	0	494	0.87	1	1
United Christian Democratic Party	502	0.88	0	457	0.81	0	0
African People's Movement	281	0.49	0	325	0.57	0	0
African People's Convention	164	0.29	0	227	0.40	0	0
Abantu Batho Congress	186	0.33	0	159	0.28	0	0
Al Jama-ah	99	0.17	0	95	0.17	0	0
Democratic Union Plus	111	0.20	0	81	0.14	0	0
African Transformation Movement	89	0.16	0	102	0.18	0	0
Black First Land First	34	0.06	0	50	0.09	0	0
National People's Front	19	0.03	0	60	0.11	0	0
Patriotic Alliance	10	0.02	0	37	0.07	0	0
Total	56,825	100.00	23	56,736	100.00	22	45
Valid votes	56,825	98.07		56,736	98.04		
Invalid/blank votes	1,118	1.93		1,133	1.96		
Total votes	57,943	100.00		57,869	100.00		
Registered voters/turnout	101,008	57.36		101,008	57.29		

=== By-elections from November 2021 ===
The following by-elections were held to fill vacant ward seats in the period since the election in November 2021.

Date	Ward	Party of the previous councillor	Party of the newly elected councillor
18 Jan 2023	9	African National Congress	Inkatha Freedom Party
15 Feb 2023	4	African National Congress	Inkatha Freedom Party
4 Dec 2024	16	Inkatha Freedom Party	Inkatha Freedom Party

In ward 9, narrowly held by the African National Congress (ANC) in 2021, the councillor resigned. The ANC failed to register a candidate in time for the resulting by-election, and the Inkatha Freedom Party (IFP) picked up the seat with 77% of the vote, solidifying their coalition in the council.

In ward 4, after the ANC councillor's resignation, the IFP won the resulting by-election.

== November 2026 election ==
The following table shows the results of the 2026 election.

Party	Ward			List			Total seats
Party	Votes	%	Seats	Votes	%	Seats	Total seats
Inkatha Freedom Party	23,446	37.69	18	24,082	38.79	0	18
uMkhonto weSizwe Party	12,926	20.78	2	13,693	22.05	8	10
African National Congress	12,621	20.29	2	12,620	20.33	7	9
Economic Freedom Fighters	2,497	4.01	1	2,422	3.90	1	2
Siyanqoba Independent Party	2,350	3.78	0	2,039	3.28	2	2
Democratic Alliance	1,245	2.00	0	1,315	2.12	1	1
African Economic Freedom	1,263	2.03	0	1,237	1.99	1	1
National Peoples Ambassadors	611	0.98	0	570	0.92	1	1
National Community Liberation	601	0.97	0	525	0.85	1	1
Independent candidates	1,053	1.69	0				0
National Freedom Party	519	0.83	0	452	0.73	0	0
United Democratic Movement	475	0.76	0	426	0.69	0	0
African Independent Congress	385	0.62	0	420	0.68	0	0
Gods Justice and Development Party	376	0.60	0	394	0.63	0	0
Labour Party of South Africa	332	0.53	0	303	0.49	0	0
Izwe Lethu Party	274	0.44	0	141	0.23	0	0
United Christian Democratic Party	217	0.35	0	193	0.31	0	0
Jozini Congress	198	0.32	0	188	0.30	0	0
Patriotic Alliance	210	0.34	0	137	0.22	0	0
Afrika Mayibuye Movement	145	0.23	0	163	0.26	0	0
African Movement Congress	120	0.19	0	135	0.22	0	0
African Christian Democratic Party	67	0.11	0	180	0.29	0	0
South African Communist Party	85	0.14	0	109	0.18	0	0
KZN Independence	86	0.14	0	98	0.16	0	0
African Transformation Movement	18	0.03	0	107	0.17	0	0
Pan Africanist Congress of Azania	48	0.08	0	30	0.05	0	0
Service Delivery Party	6	0.01	0	67	0.11	0	0
Al Jama-ah	29	0.05	0	19	0.03	0	0
Afrika Unite Congress	10	0.02	0	21	0.03	0	0
Total	62,213	100.00	23	62,086	100.00	22	45
Valid votes	62,213	98.59		62,086	98.64		
Invalid/blank votes	892	1.41		855	1.36		
Total votes	63,105	100.00		62,941	100.00		
Registered voters/turnout	112,457	56.11		112,457	55.97		
