= Malizole Diko =

South African politician (d. 2006)

Member of the National Assembly
- In office 23 April 2004 – 28 July 2006

Personal details
- Died: 28 July 2006 Cape Town, South Africa
- Citizenship: South Africa
- Party: United Independent Front (from 2005); United Democratic Movement (until 2005)

Malizole Diko (died 28 July 2006) was a South African politician who served in the National Assembly from April 2004 until his death in July 2006. He was the Deputy President of the United Democratic Movement (UDM) until the floor-crossing period of September 2005, when he left to establish his own breakaway party, the United Independent Front (UIF).

== Political career ==
Diko rose through the Western Cape structures of the UDM to become the party's national spokesperson, its national secretary-general, and finally its national deputy president under UDM president Bantu Holomisa. In the 2004 general election, he was elected to represent the UDM in the National Assembly, the lower house of the South African Parliament.

On 5 August 2005, while he was UDM deputy president, he and five other senior UDM members were suspended from the party amid reports that they intended to defect from the party in the upcoming floor-crossing period. The Cape High Court overturned the suspensions on 30 August, ruling that they had not been procedural in terms of the party's own constitution. However, the day after the ruling – which was the day before the floor-crossing window opened – Holomisa announced that Diko and the others had been expelled from the party with immediate effect for acting "in clear contravention of the letter and spirit of the UDM constitution". In terms of the South African Constitution, the expulsion entailed that Diko lost his seat in the National Assembly. However, he successfully challenged the expulsion in court; on 14 September, the Cape High Court again overruled the party's decision as unlawful and invalid.

Immediately after the second ruling, which restored his membership in the National Assembly the day before the floor-crossing window closed, Diko confirmed his intention to cross the floor and leave the UDM to join another party or form a new one. On 15 September, he established and formally joined the UIF; Nomakhaya Mdaka, another UDM member, joined him as the UIF's second representative in the National Assembly.

== Death ==
Diko died in Cape Town on 28 July 2006 after a short illness. His seat in the National Assembly was filled by Zintle Alexia Ndlazi of the UIF, though she herself crossed the floor during the 2007 floor-crossing window and joined the African National Congress (ANC).

== See also ==
- List of members of the National Assembly of South Africa who died in office
