= Nomakhaya Mdaka =

South African politician

Member of the National Assembly
- In office 23 April 2004 – 12 November 2014

Personal details
- Citizenship: South Africa
- Party: African Transformation Movement (current)
- Other political affiliations: African National Congress (2007–2014); United Independent Front (2005–2007); United Democratic Movement (2004–2005)

Nomakhaya Mavis Mdaka is a South African politician who served in the National Assembly from 2004 to 2014, representing variously the United Democratic Movement (UDM), the United Independent Front (UIF), and the African National Congress (ANC). She defected from the UDM to the UIF during the floor-crossing period of 2005 and then from the UIF to the ANC during the floor-crossing period of 2007. After she resigned from the National Assembly in November 2014, Mdaka joined the African Transformation Movement (ATM).

== Political career ==
Prior to her election to Parliament, Mdaka was a member of the ANC. She was active in the ANC Women's League in Chris Hani District in the Eastern Cape and she represented the party as a local councillor in Chris Hani District and Engcobo Local Municipality.

=== United Democratic Movement: 2004–2005 ===
In the 2004 general election, Mdaka was elected to the National Assembly, the lower house of the South African Parliament, representing the UDM in the Eastern Cape. On 5 August 2005, she and five other senior UDM members – including UDM Deputy President Malizole Diko – were suspended from the party amid reports that they intended to defect from the party in the upcoming floor-crossing period. The Cape High Court overturned the suspensions on 30 August, ruling that they had not been procedural in terms of the party's own constitution.

However, the day after the ruling – which was the day before the floor-crossing window opened – Holomisa announced that Mdaka and the others had been expelled from the party with immediate effect for acting "in clear contravention of the letter and spirit of the UDM constitution". In terms of the South African Constitution, the expulsion entailed that Mdaka seat in the National Assembly. However, she successfully challenged the expulsion in court; on 14 September, the Cape High Court again overruled the party's decision as unlawful and invalid.

=== United Independent Front: 2005–2007 ===
The second ruling came the day before the floor-crossing window closed, and, on 15 September, Mdaka formally joined Diko's newly established party, the UIF. However, she represented the UIF only until the next floor-crossing window in September 2007. Ahead of the floor-crossing period, in March 2007, the UIF in turn attempted to expel Mdaka, but she was again reinstated by order of the high court. On 12 September, she left the UIF to return to the ANC.

=== African National Congress: 2007–2014 ===
Mdaka served the rest of the legislative term with the ANC and she was re-elected to her seat in the 2009 general election. In the next general election in 2014, she was elected to her third term in the National Assembly, ranked 98th on the ANC's national party list; however, she resigned from her seats months into the legislative term on 12 November 2014. She subsequently joined the ATM, which was founded in 2018, and in the 2019 general election she ran unsuccessfully for election to the National Assembly on the ATM's list.

== Personal life ==
Mdaka has at least one child.
