= Gavin Woods =

Gavin Woods may refer to:

- Gavin Woods (politician) (1947-2024), South African politician
- Gavin Woods (water polo) (born 1978), Australian water polo player
