= Lepelle-Nkumpi Local Municipality elections =

The Lepelle-Nkumpi Local Municipality is a Local Municipality in Limpopo, South Africa. The council consists of sixty members elected by mixed-member proportional representation. Thirty councillors are elected by first-past-the-post voting in thirty wards, while the remaining thirty are chosen from party lists so that the total number of party representatives is proportional to the number of votes received. In the election of 1 November 2021 the African National Congress (ANC) won a majority of 40 seats.

== Results ==
The following table shows the composition of the council after past elections.

Event	ACDP	ANC	AZAPO	DA	EFF	PAC	Other	Total
2000 election	2	41	2	2	—	—	2	49
2006 election	1	47	1	2	—	1	2	54
2011 election	1	47	1	2	—	1	5	57
2016 election	0	40	0	3	15	0	2	60
2021 election	0	40	0	2	12	0	6	60

== December 2000 election ==
The following table shows the results of the 2000 election.

Party	Ward			List			Total seats
Party	Votes	%	Seats	Votes	%	Seats	Total seats
African National Congress	27,094	83.16	25	26,932	82.72	16	41
Azanian People's Organisation	1,599	4.91	0	1,637	5.03	2	2
Democratic Alliance	1,639	5.03	0	1,572	4.83	2	2
African Christian Democratic Party	1,127	3.46	0	1,049	3.22	2	2
United Democratic Movement	585	1.80	0	1,010	3.10	1	1
Inkatha Freedom Party	291	0.89	0	359	1.10	1	1
Independent candidates	245	0.75	0				0
Total	32,580	100.00	25	32,559	100.00	24	49
Valid votes	32,580	98.14		32,559	98.24		
Invalid/blank votes	616	1.86		582	1.76		
Total votes	33,196	100.00		33,141	100.00		
Registered voters/turnout	82,561	40.21		82,561	40.14		

== March 2006 election ==
The following table shows the results of the 2006 election.

Party	Ward			List			Total seats
Party	Votes	%	Seats	Votes	%	Seats	Total seats
African National Congress	32,942	88.16	27	32,757	87.76	20	47
Democratic Alliance	1,279	3.42	0	1,080	2.89	2	2
United Independent Front	1,048	2.80	0	1,006	2.70	2	2
Azanian People's Organisation	922	2.47	0	913	2.45	1	1
African Christian Democratic Party	529	1.42	0	629	1.69	1	1
Pan Africanist Congress of Azania	461	1.23	0	611	1.64	1	1
Alliance for Democracy and Prosperity	184	0.49	0	331	0.89	0	0
Total	37,365	100.00	27	37,327	100.00	27	54
Valid votes	37,365	98.36		37,327	98.14		
Invalid/blank votes	624	1.64		709	1.86		
Total votes	37,989	100.00		38,036	100.00		
Registered voters/turnout	91,460	41.54		91,460	41.59		

== May 2011 election ==
The following table shows the results of the 2011 election.

Party	Ward			List			Total seats
Party	Votes	%	Seats	Votes	%	Seats	Total seats
African National Congress	35,242	77.73	28	36,972	82.16	19	47
Congress of the People	2,356	5.20	0	3,246	7.21	4	4
Independent candidates	4,193	9.25	1				1
Democratic Alliance	1,687	3.72	0	1,813	4.03	2	2
Pan Africanist Congress of Azania	876	1.93	0	1,530	3.40	1	1
African Christian Democratic Party	507	1.12	0	492	1.09	1	1
Azanian People's Organisation	320	0.71	0	592	1.32	1	1
United Independent Front	137	0.30	0	188	0.42	0	0
Black Consciousness Party	21	0.05	0	169	0.38	0	0
Total	45,339	100.00	29	45,002	100.00	28	57
Valid votes	45,339	97.97		45,002	97.16		
Invalid/blank votes	938	2.03		1,317	2.84		
Total votes	46,277	100.00		46,319	100.00		
Registered voters/turnout	98,391	47.03		98,391	47.08		

== August 2016 election ==
The following table shows the results of the 2016 election.

Party	Ward			List			Total seats
Party	Votes	%	Seats	Votes	%	Seats	Total seats
African National Congress	32,880	63.97	30	34,313	67.15	10	40
Economic Freedom Fighters	12,373	24.07	0	12,430	24.32	15	15
Democratic Alliance	2,030	3.95	0	2,117	4.14	3	3
Independent candidates	1,990	3.87	0				0
Lebowakgomo Civic Organization	859	1.67	0	799	1.56	1	1
Lepelle-Nkumpi Development Party	480	0.93	0	512	1.00	1	1
African Christian Democratic Party	242	0.47	0	258	0.50	0	0
Pan Africanist Congress of Azania	192	0.37	0	232	0.45	0	0
Azanian People's Organisation	86	0.17	0	269	0.53	0	0
United Christian Democratic Party	76	0.15	0	171	0.33	0	0
Congress of the People	195	0.38	0				0
Total	51,403	100.00	30	51,101	100.00	30	60
Valid votes	51,403	98.36		51,101	98.03		
Invalid/blank votes	855	1.64		1,028	1.97		
Total votes	52,258	100.00		52,129	100.00		
Registered voters/turnout	105,754	49.41		105,754	49.29		

== November 2021 election ==
The following table shows the results of the 2021 election.

Party	Ward			List			Total seats
Party	Votes	%	Seats	Votes	%	Seats	Total seats
African National Congress	28,292	61.41	30	29,871	65.95	10	40
Economic Freedom Fighters	8,025	17.42	0	8,781	19.39	12	12
Defenders of the People	2,789	6.05	0	2,903	6.41	4	4
Independent candidates	3,931	8.53	0				0
Democratic Alliance	1,284	2.79	0	1,387	3.06	2	2
Magoshi Swaranang Movement	399	0.87	0	476	1.05	1	1
Lebowakgomo Civic Organization	264	0.57	0	436	0.96	1	1
African Christian Democratic Party	287	0.62	0	288	0.64	0	0
Pan Africanist Congress of Azania	228	0.49	0	297	0.66	0	0
Azanian People's Organisation	115	0.25	0	212	0.47	0	0
African Transformation Movement	121	0.26	0	167	0.37	0	0
Abantu Batho Congress	136	0.30	0	140	0.31	0	0
Congress of the People	78	0.17	0	184	0.41	0	0
Democratic Artists Party	57	0.12	0	85	0.19	0	0
Party of Action	68	0.15	0	69	0.15	0	0
Total	46,074	100.00	30	45,296	100.00	30	60
Valid votes	46,074	98.02		45,296	96.90		
Invalid/blank votes	930	1.98		1,447	3.10		
Total votes	47,004	100.00		46,743	100.00		
Registered voters/turnout	108,738	43.23		108,738	42.99		

=== By-elections from November 2021 ===
The following by-elections were held to fill vacant ward seats in the period since the election in November 2021.

Date	Ward	Party of the previous councillor	Party of the newly elected councillor
11 Jun 2024	17	African National Congress	African National Congress
