= Endumeni Local Municipality elections =

Local elections in KwaZulu-Natal, South Africa

The Endumeni Local Municipality council consists of fifteen members elected by mixed-member proportional representation. Eight councillors are elected by first-past-the-post voting in eight wards, while the remaining seven are chosen from party lists so that the total number of party representatives is proportional to the number of votes received.

In the election of 4 November 2026, no party gained a majority, with the uMkhonto weSizwe Party winning the largest number of seats on the council, five.

== Results ==
The following table shows the composition of the council after past elections.

| Event | ANC | DA | EFF | IFP | MKP | Other | Total |
|---|---|---|---|---|---|---|---|
| 2000 election | 4 | 4 | — | 4 | — | 0 | 12 |
| 2006 election | 6 | 2 | — | 4 | — | 0 | 12 |
| 2011 election | 6 | 3 | — | 2 | — | 1 | 12 |
| 2016 election | 6 | 2 | 1 | 4 | — | 0 | 13 |
| 2021 election | 5 | 2 | 0 | 5 | — | 1 | 13 |
| 2026 election | 2 | 2 | 0 | 4 | 5 | 2 | 15 |

== December 2000 election ==
The following table shows the results of the 2000 election.

| Party | Ward | | | List | | | Total seats |
| Party | Votes | % | Seats | Votes | % | Seats | Total seats |
|---|---|---|---|---|---|---|---|
| Inkatha Freedom Party | 2,659 | 29.67 | 1 | 2,981 | 33.84 | 3 | 4 |
| African National Congress | 2,508 | 27.98 | 3 | 3,012 | 34.20 | 1 | 4 |
| Democratic Alliance | 2,294 | 25.60 | 2 | 2,815 | 31.96 | 2 | 4 |
| Independent candidates | 1,501 | 16.75 | 0 | | | | 0 |
| Total | 8,962 | 100.00 | 6 | 8,808 | 100.00 | 6 | 12 |
| Valid votes | 8,962 | 97.13 | | 8,808 | 95.50 | | |
| Invalid/blank votes | 265 | 2.87 | | 415 | 4.50 | | |
| Total votes | 9,227 | 100.00 | | 9,223 | 100.00 | | |
| Registered voters/turnout | 18,611 | 49.58 | | 18,611 | 49.56 | | |

== March 2006 election ==
The following table shows the results of the 2006 election.

| Party | Ward | | | List | | | Total seats |
| Party | Votes | % | Seats | Votes | % | Seats | Total seats |
|---|---|---|---|---|---|---|---|
| African National Congress | 5,024 | 47.24 | 5 | 5,053 | 47.43 | 1 | 6 |
| Inkatha Freedom Party | 3,333 | 31.34 | 1 | 3,307 | 31.04 | 3 | 4 |
| Democratic Alliance | 1,522 | 14.31 | 0 | 1,809 | 16.98 | 2 | 2 |
| National Democratic Convention | 397 | 3.73 | 0 | 405 | 3.80 | 0 | 0 |
| Independent candidates | 346 | 3.25 | 0 | | | | 0 |
| Royal Loyal Progress | 13 | 0.12 | 0 | 80 | 0.75 | 0 | 0 |
| Total | 10,635 | 100.00 | 6 | 10,654 | 100.00 | 6 | 12 |
| Valid votes | 10,635 | 97.57 | | 10,654 | 97.69 | | |
| Invalid/blank votes | 265 | 2.43 | | 252 | 2.31 | | |
| Total votes | 10,900 | 100.00 | | 10,906 | 100.00 | | |
| Registered voters/turnout | 21,425 | 50.88 | | 21,425 | 50.90 | | |

== May 2011 election ==
The following table shows the results of the 2011 election.

| Party | Ward | | | List | | | Total seats |
| Party | Votes | % | Seats | Votes | % | Seats | Total seats |
|---|---|---|---|---|---|---|---|
| African National Congress | 6,981 | 51.05 | 5 | 7,131 | 51.66 | 1 | 6 |
| Democratic Alliance | 2,879 | 21.05 | 1 | 2,765 | 20.03 | 2 | 3 |
| Inkatha Freedom Party | 2,256 | 16.50 | 0 | 2,174 | 15.75 | 2 | 2 |
| National Freedom Party | 1,484 | 10.85 | 0 | 1,650 | 11.95 | 1 | 1 |
| Congress of the People | 71 | 0.52 | 0 | 85 | 0.62 | 0 | 0 |
| Federal Congress | 4 | 0.03 | 0 | | | | 0 |
| Total | 13,675 | 100.00 | 6 | 13,805 | 100.00 | 6 | 12 |
| Valid votes | 13,675 | 98.28 | | 13,805 | 98.33 | | |
| Invalid/blank votes | 240 | 1.72 | | 235 | 1.67 | | |
| Total votes | 13,915 | 100.00 | | 14,040 | 100.00 | | |
| Registered voters/turnout | 24,500 | 56.80 | | 24,500 | 57.31 | | |

== August 2016 election ==
The following table shows the results of the 2016 election.

| Party | Ward | | | List | | | Total seats |
| Party | Votes | % | Seats | Votes | % | Seats | Total seats |
|---|---|---|---|---|---|---|---|
| African National Congress | 8,112 | 48.51 | 5 | 8,452 | 50.55 | 1 | 6 |
| Inkatha Freedom Party | 5,227 | 31.25 | 1 | 4,981 | 29.79 | 3 | 4 |
| Democratic Alliance | 2,522 | 15.08 | 1 | 2,692 | 16.10 | 1 | 2 |
| Economic Freedom Fighters | 684 | 4.09 | 0 | 595 | 3.56 | 1 | 1 |
| Independent candidates | 179 | 1.07 | 0 | | | | 0 |
| Total | 16,724 | 100.00 | 7 | 16,720 | 100.00 | 6 | 13 |
| Valid votes | 16,724 | 98.38 | | 16,720 | 98.20 | | |
| Invalid/blank votes | 276 | 1.62 | | 306 | 1.80 | | |
| Total votes | 17,000 | 100.00 | | 17,026 | 100.00 | | |
| Registered voters/turnout | 29,061 | 58.50 | | 29,061 | 58.59 | | |

No party obtained a majority. The Inkatha Freedom Party (IFP) formed a government with the support of the Democratic Alliance (DA) and the Economic Freedom Fighters (EFF).

=== August 2016 to November 2021 by-elections ===
In a by-election held in March 2019 the ANC won a ward previously held by the IFP, giving the party an outright majority. This majority was expanded further when ANC won another ward from the DA in June the same year. The council was reconstituted as seen below:

| Party | Ward | PR list | Total |
|---|---|---|---|
| ANC | 7 | 1 | 8 |
| Inkatha Freedom Party | 0 | 3 | 3 |
| DA | 0 | 1 | 1 |
| Economic Freedom Fighters | 0 | 1 | 1 |
| Total | 7 | 6 | 13 |

== November 2021 election ==
The following table shows the results of the 2021 election.

| Party | Ward | | | List | | | Total seats |
| Party | Votes | % | Seats | Votes | % | Seats | Total seats |
|---|---|---|---|---|---|---|---|
| African National Congress | 5,322 | 36.08 | 3 | 5,350 | 36.29 | 2 | 5 |
| Inkatha Freedom Party | 5,084 | 34.46 | 2 | 5,314 | 36.05 | 3 | 5 |
| Democratic Alliance | 2,159 | 14.64 | 1 | 2,155 | 14.62 | 1 | 2 |
| Abantu Batho Congress | 1,137 | 7.71 | 1 | 1,076 | 7.30 | 0 | 1 |
| Economic Freedom Fighters | 524 | 3.55 | 0 | 511 | 3.47 | 0 | 0 |
| National Freedom Party | 129 | 0.87 | 0 | 134 | 0.91 | 0 | 0 |
| Independent candidates | 186 | 1.26 | 0 | | | | 0 |
| Patriotic Alliance | 75 | 0.51 | 0 | 75 | 0.51 | 0 | 0 |
| African Transformation Movement | 64 | 0.43 | 0 | 66 | 0.45 | 0 | 0 |
| African People's Movement | 51 | 0.35 | 0 | 45 | 0.31 | 0 | 0 |
| National Democratic Convention | 21 | 0.14 | 0 | 16 | 0.11 | 0 | 0 |
| Total | 14,752 | 100.00 | 7 | 14,742 | 100.00 | 6 | 13 |
| Valid votes | 14,752 | 98.72 | | 14,742 | 98.67 | | |
| Invalid/blank votes | 191 | 1.28 | | 198 | 1.33 | | |
| Total votes | 14,943 | 100.00 | | 14,940 | 100.00 | | |
| Registered voters/turnout | 29,725 | 50.27 | | 29,725 | 50.26 | | |

== November 2026 election ==
The following table shows the results of the 2026 election.

| Party | Ward | | | List | | | Total seats |
| Party | Votes | % | Seats | Votes | % | Seats | Total seats |
|---|---|---|---|---|---|---|---|
| uMkhonto weSizwe Party | 6,081 | 31.81 | 5 | 6,364 | 33.29 | 0 | 5 |
| Inkatha Freedom Party | 4,726 | 24.73 | 1 | 4,670 | 24.43 | 3 | 4 |
| Democratic Alliance | 2,881 | 15.07 | 2 | 3,157 | 16.52 | 0 | 2 |
| African National Congress | 2,504 | 13.10 | 0 | 2,506 | 13.11 | 2 | 2 |
| South African Communist Party | 1,054 | 5.51 | 0 | 990 | 5.18 | 1 | 1 |
| Freedom Front Plus | 992 | 5.19 | 0 | 1,016 | 5.32 | 1 | 1 |
| Independent candidates | 431 | 2.25 | 0 | | | | 0 |
| Patriotic Alliance | 164 | 0.86 | 0 | 118 | 0.62 | 0 | 0 |
| Economic Freedom Fighters | 134 | 0.70 | 0 | 146 | 0.76 | 0 | 0 |
| African Transformation Movement | 67 | 0.35 | 0 | 76 | 0.40 | 0 | 0 |
| Labour Party of South Africa | 15 | 0.08 | 0 | 28 | 0.15 | 0 | 0 |
| National Democratic Convention | 21 | 0.11 | 0 | 22 | 0.12 | 0 | 0 |
| Organic Humanity Movement | 23 | 0.12 | 0 | 6 | 0.03 | 0 | 0 |
| African Economic Freedom | 9 | 0.05 | 0 | 16 | 0.08 | 0 | 0 |
| African Renaissance Unity | 12 | 0.06 | 0 | | | | 0 |
| Total | 19,114 | 100.00 | 8 | 19,115 | 100.00 | 7 | 15 |
| Valid votes | 19,114 | 99.12 | | 19,115 | 99.02 | | |
| Invalid/blank votes | 169 | 0.88 | | 190 | 0.98 | | |
| Total votes | 19,283 | 100.00 | | 19,305 | 100.00 | | |
| Registered voters/turnout | 35,924 | 53.68 | | 35,924 | 53.74 | | |
