= Makhosazana Mdlalose =

South African politician

Member of the National Assembly
- In office June 2003 – May 2009

Personal details
- Born: 11 April 1957 (age 69)
- Citizenship: South Africa
- Party: Democratic Alliance (since 2009)
- Other party: National Democratic Convention (2005–09); Inkatha Freedom Party (until 2005)
- Relations: Frank Mdlalose (father)

Makhosazana Mpho Mdlalose (born 11 March 1957) is a South African politician who has served in the National Assembly and KwaZulu-Natal Provincial Legislature, variously representing the Inkatha Freedom Party (IFP), the National Democratic Convention (Nadeco), and the Democratic Alliance (DA).

== Early life and career ==
Mdlalose was born on 11 March 1957. She is the eldest daughter of Frank Mdlalose, the first Premier of KwaZulu-Natal. She joined the IFP in her youth and represented the party in the Newcastle Local Council from 1996 to 2000. By 2003, she was an assistant school principal in Newcastle and the chairman of a local party branch.

== Legislative career ==
In late June 2003, Mdlalose was sworn in to a seat in the National Assembly, filling a casual vacancy in the IFP caucus. She was elected to a full term in her seat in the 2004 general election, standing on the party list for the IFP in KwaZulu-Natal. However, she defected to the newly formed Nadeco on 6 September 2005 during the 2005 floor-crossing window. She subsequently served on Nadeco's national executive committee.

Ahead of the 2009 general election, Mdlalose left Nadeco to join the DA, and in the election she was elected to a DA seat in the KwaZulu-Natal Provincial Legislature.
