= African National Congress candidates for the 2009 South African general election =

Full list submitted to Electoral Commission for the 2009 general election

The African National Congress retained majorities in the National Assembly of South Africa & National Council of Provinces as well as in eight of the nine provincial legislatures, but lost control of the Western Cape. Members are elected using party-list proportional representation.

== National Assembly (National List) ==
- Candidates whose names are in **bold** were elected on the ANC's national list to Parliament.
1. **Jacob Zuma**
2. **Kgalema Motlanthe**
3. **Baleka Mbete**
4. **Trevor Manuel**
5. **Winnie Madikizela-Mandela**
6. **Nkosazana Dlamini-Zuma**
7. **Jeffrey Radebe**
8. **Lindiwe Sisulu**
9. **Blade Nzimande**
10. **Naledi Pandor**
11. **Fikile Mbalula**
12. **Nosiviwe Nqakula**
13. **Zola Skweyiya**
14. **Nozizwe Routledge**
15. **Nathi Mthethwa**
16. **Bathabile Dlamini**
17. **Pallo Jordan**
18. **Angie Motshekga**
19. **Malusi Gigaba**
20. **Barbara Hogan**
21. **Sicelo Shiceka**
22. **Nomaindia Mfeketo**
23. **Makhenkesi Stofile**
24. **Manto Tshabalala-Msimang**
25. **Ngoako Ramatlhodi**
26. **Rejoice Mabudafhasi**
27. **Enoch Godongwana**
28. **Lindiwe Hendricks**
29. **Charles Nqakula**
30. **Susan Shabangu**
31. **Tokyo Sexwale**
32. **Lulama Xingwana**
33. **Siphiwe Nyanda**
34. **Buyelwa Sonjica**
35. **S'bu Ndebele**
36. **Lumka Yengeni**
37. **Jeremy Cronin**
38. **Maite Nkoana-Mashabane**
39. **Max Sisulu**
40. **Susan Van Der Merwe**
41. **Sango Patekile Holomisa**
42. **Dipuo Peters**
43. **Mathole Motshekga**
44. **Lindiwe Zulu**
45. **Collins Chabane**
46. LIST INCOMPLETE

== See also ==
- African National Congress
- 2009 South African general election
