= Kent Morkel =

Retired South African politician and son of Gerald Morkel

Kent Hercules Morkel is a retired South African politician and the son of the late politician Gerald Morkel. He served as a Member of the Western Cape Provincial Parliament. He is a member of the African National Congress (ANC). He was a member of the Democratic Alliance (DA), the New National Party (NNP) and the Labour Party (LP).

== Political career ==
Morkel was a member of the Labour Party before he was elected a councillor for the NNP in 1996. He was formerly chairperson of the now-defunct Cape Metropolitan Council's executive committee. In 2000, he declined to run for the position of unicity mayor ahead of the municipal election. He announced this following the expulsion of Mayor William Bantom. The ANC alleged that the dismissal of Bantom meant that Morkel stood to benefit due to his father serving as premier. Morkel denied this claim and was a councillor candidate for the newly created DA instead.

Morkel held senior positions in the DA. He served as the party's provincial chairperson. He was also head of the party's caucus in the City of Cape Town municipality. He was a DA representative in the Western Cape Provincial Parliament.

In June 2005, Morkel was accused of accepting bribes from the company Gilt Edged Management Services (Gems).

Morkel defected to the ANC during the September 2007 floor-crossing window period. Fellow DA MPP Kobus Brynard also joined the ANC. The defections were announced at a press conference headed by ANC national chairperson Mosiuoa Lekota.

In February 2008, it became known that during Morkel's tenure as DA provincial chairperson, he allegedly offered a bribe to Independent Democrats councillor Sheval Arendse for him to defect to the DA. The agreement between Arendse and Morkel was discussed before the Erasmus Commission of Inquiry into allegations of spying in the Cape Town City Council. In April, Morkel denied that he had accepted a bribe from Badih Chaaban.

Morkel soon retired from politics.
