= South African Democratic Congress =

Disbanded South African political party

The South African Democratic Congress (Sadeco) was formed in 2008 by Ziba Jiyane, the founder of the National Democratic Convention (Nadeco), after he left in a dispute over leadership. Jiyane had been the Secretary-General of the Inkatha Freedom Party. The party won no seats in the 2009 general election.

In April 2011, ahead of the local elections, Jiyane and the SADECO Federal Council voted to disband the party and join the much larger Democratic Alliance.

== Election results ==
Election	Votes	%	Seats
2009	6,035	0.03	0
