= 2007 South African floor-crossing window period =

The 2007 floor crossing window period in South Africa was a period of 15 days, from 1 to 15 September 2007, in which members of the National Assembly and the provincial legislatures, and municipal councils were able to cross the floor from one political party to another without giving up their seats. The period was authorised by the Tenth Amendment of the Constitution of South Africa, which scheduled regular window periods in the second and fourth September after each election. The previous general election had been held on 14 April 2004, and a previous window period had occurred in September 2005.

In the National Assembly and the provincial legislatures, the changes were minor, with the most significant development being the creation of the African People's Convention by departing members of the Pan Africanist Congress.

The tables below show all the changes; in those provinces not listed there was no change in the provincial legislature.

== Tables ==
=== National Assembly ===
Party	Seats before	Net change	Seats after
ANC	293	+4	297
DA	47	0	47
IFP	23	0	23
UDM	6	0	6
ID	5	−1	4
ACDP	4	0	4
VF+	4	0	4
National Democratic Convention	4	0	4
UCDP	3	0	3
MF	2	0	2
APC (Note: Party created during this floor-crossing period.)		+2	2
PAC	3	−2	1
AZAPO	1	0	1
Federation of Democrats	1	0	1
National Alliance		+1	1
United Independent Front	2	−2	0
Progressive Independent Movement	1	−1	0
United Party	1	−1	0
Total	400		

=== Eastern Cape Provincial Legislature ===
Party	Seats before	Net change	Seats after
ANC	51	+2	53
DA	5	0	5
UDM	4	0	4
APC		+1	1
United Independent Front	2	−2	0
PAC	1	−1	0
Total	63		

=== Gauteng Provincial Legislature ===
Party	Seats before	Net change	Seats after
ANC	51	0	51
DA	12	+1	13
IFP	2	0	2
VF+	1	+1	2
ID	1	+1	2
ACDP	1	0	1
Alliance of Free Democrats	1	0	1
APC		+1	1
Federal Alliance	2	−2	0
PAC	1	−1	0
United Independent Front	1	−1	0
Total	73		

=== KwaZulu-Natal Provincial Legislature ===
Party	Seats before	Net change	Seats after
ANC	40	+1	41
IFP	27	0	27
DA	5	0	5
National Democratic Convention	4	−1	3
MF	2	0	2
ACDP	1	0	1
UDM	1	0	1
Total	80		

=== Limpopo Provincial Legislature ===
Party	Seats before	Net change	Seats after
ANC	45	+1	46
DA	2	−1	1
ACDP	1	0	1
United Independent Front	1	0	1
Total	49		

=== Northern Cape Provincial Legislature ===
Party	Seats before	Net change	Seats after
ANC	24	+1	25
DA	3	−1	2
ACDP	1	0	1
VF+	1	0	1
ID	1	0	1
Total	30		

=== Western Cape Provincial Parliament ===
Party	Seats before	Net change	Seats after
ANC	24	+3	27
DA	13	−2	11
ACDP	2	0	2
United Independent Front	2	−1	1
ID	1	0	1
Total	42		

=== National Council of Provinces ===
The National Council of Provinces was reconstituted as a result of the changes in the provincial legislatures. Its reconstituted makeup was as follows:

Party	Delegate type	EC	FS	G	KZN	L	M	NW	NC	WC	Total	
ANC	Permanent	4	4	4	3	5	5	4	4	3	36	68
ANC	Special	4	4	3	2	4	4	4	4	3	32	68
DA	Permanent	1	1	1	1	1	1	1	1	2	10	12
DA	Special			1						1	2	12
IFP	Permanent			1	2						3	4
IFP	Special				1						1	4
ACDP	Permanent									1	1	
ID	Permanent								1		1	
VF+	Permanent		1								1	
UCDP	Permanent							1			1	
UDM	Permanent	1									1	
National Democratic Convention	Special				1						1	
Total		10	10	10	10	10	10	10	10	10	90	

== National floor crossings ==
=== From PAC to APC ===
- Themba Godi
- Mofihli Likotsi

== Provincial floor crossings ==
=== Eastern Cape ===
==== From PAC to APC ====
- Zingisa Mkhabile

=== Western Cape ===
==== From UIF to DA ====
- Elizabeth Thompson (politician)

==== From DA to ANC ====
- Kent Morkel
- Kobus Brynard

=== Gauteng ===
==== From PAC to APC ====
- Malesela Ledwaba

== Municipal floor crossings ==
=== City of Cape Town ===
==== From DA to NPP ====
- David Sasman

== See also ==
- Floor crossing (South Africa)
- 2003 South African floor-crossing window period
- 2005 South African floor-crossing window period
