= United Independent Front =

- Abbreviation: UIF
- Leader: Malizole Diko
- Deputy Leader: Nomakhaya Mdaka
- Founded: September 2005
- Headquarters: Cape Town

Website
- http://www.unitedindependentfront.co.za/

The United Independent Front (UIF) was a political party in South Africa. It broke away from the United Democratic Movement (UDM). Until his death in 2006, it was led by Malizole Diko. He and Nomakhaya Mdaka were the sole members of parliament and left the UDM on 15 September 2005 during the floor crossing period.

The party failed to win any seats in the 2009 general election and have since failed to renew their registration with the Independent Electoral Commission.

== Election results ==
Election	Votes	%	Seats
2009	8,872	0.05	0
