= Gavin Woods (politician) =

South African politician (1948–2024)

Member of the National Assembly of South Africa
- In office 1994–2009

Personal details
- Born: 1948
- Died: 15 January 2024 (aged 75–76)
- Party: National Democratic Convention
- Other political affiliations: Inkatha Freedom Party (1984–2005)
- Occupation: Politician, academic, public service activist
- Known for: Public accounts oversight; exposing corruption in the Arms Deal

Gavin Woods (1948 – 15 January 2024) was a South African politician, academic and public service activist.

== Life and career ==
Woods joined the Inkatha Freedom Party (IFP) in 1984 after being recruited by Mangosuthu Buthelezi. He was a member of parliament for the party between 1994 and 2009, serving on public accounts and finance committees, including as chairperson of the standing committee, and worked with Patricia de Lille on exposing corruption in the Arms Deal. Woods resigned as chairperson of the standing committee after his interventions were not taken up by the governing African National Congress (ANC).

Woods' relationship with Buthelezi came under strain when Buthelezi ordered that Woods' report on how to reverse the decline in the IFP's support be shredded, and when Buthelezi stated that Woods, who had polio as a child and had part of his leg amputated, was only an MP due to his disability. Woods left the IFP in 2005, crossing the floor to the National Democratic Convention (Nadeco).

Woods later worked at Stellenbosch University as a professor of public finance and ethics, and then between 2013 and 2017 for the Public Service Commission, focusing on measures to deal with corruption, and service delivery.

Woods died of cancer on 15 January 2024.
