= 2009 South African general election =

- 22 April 2009

All 400 seats in the National Assembly 201 seats needed for a majority
- Registered: 23,181,997
- Turnout: 77.30% (▲0.60pp)
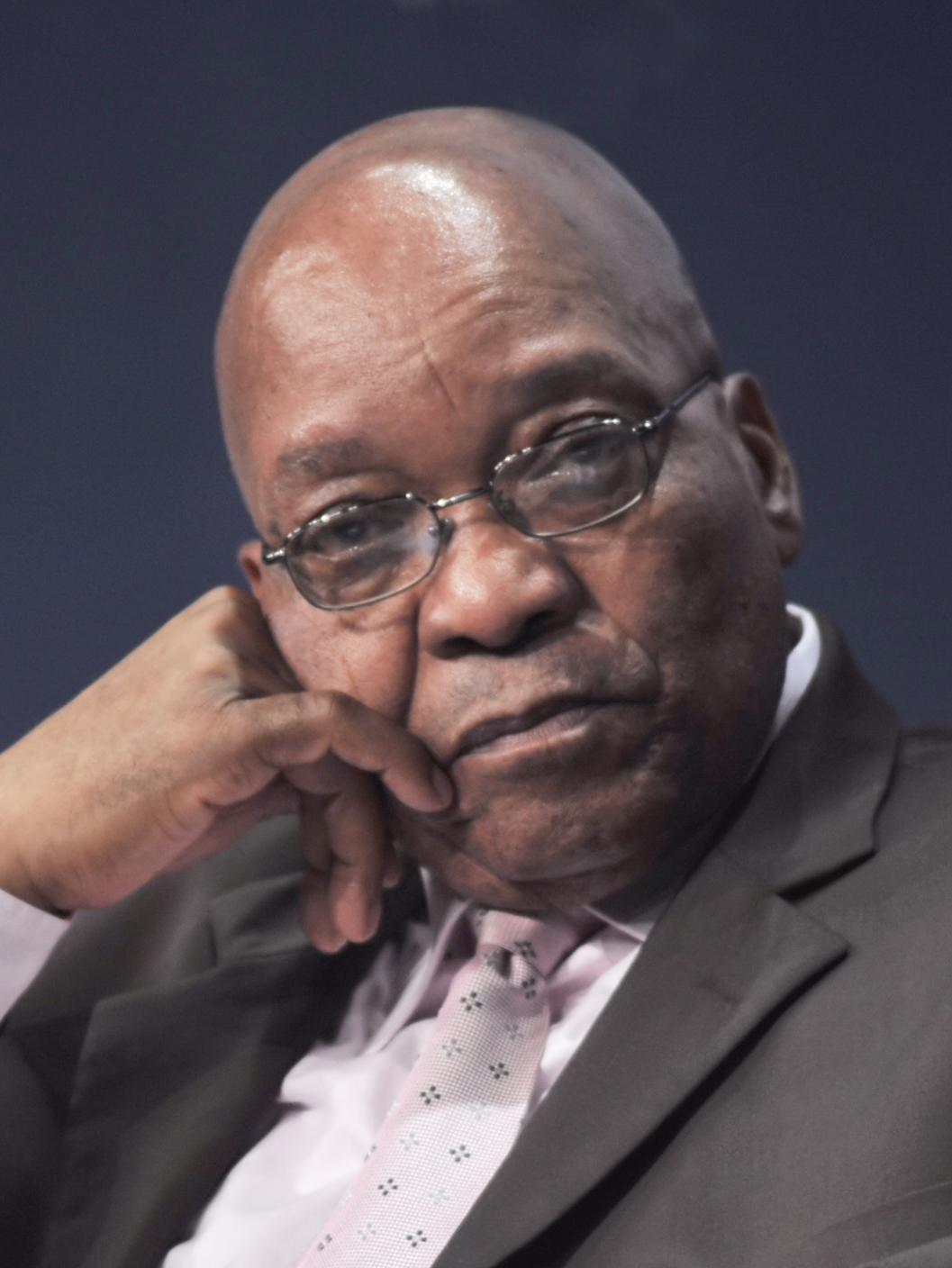

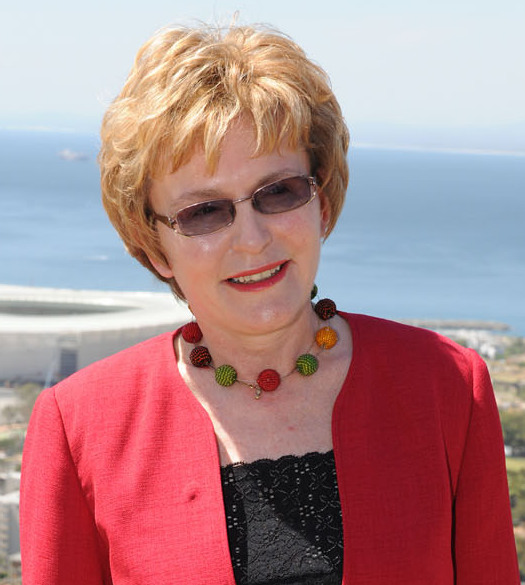

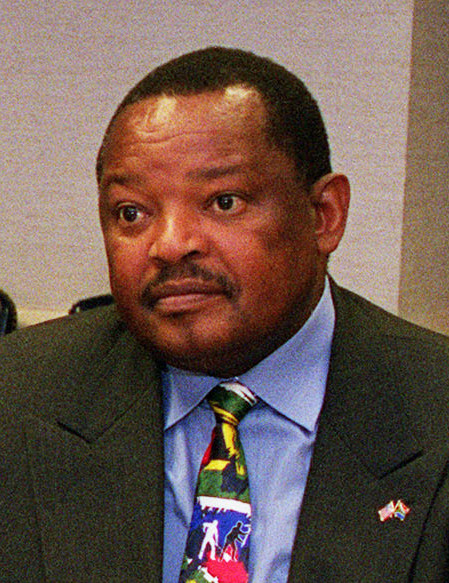

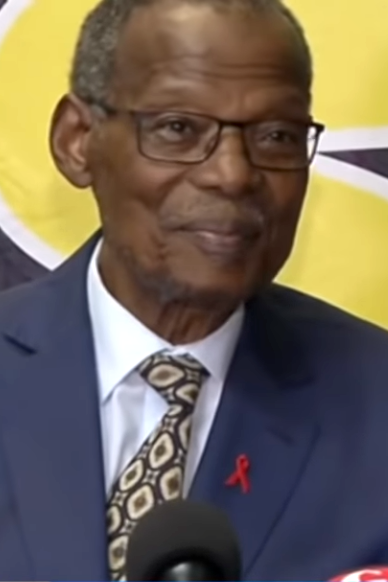

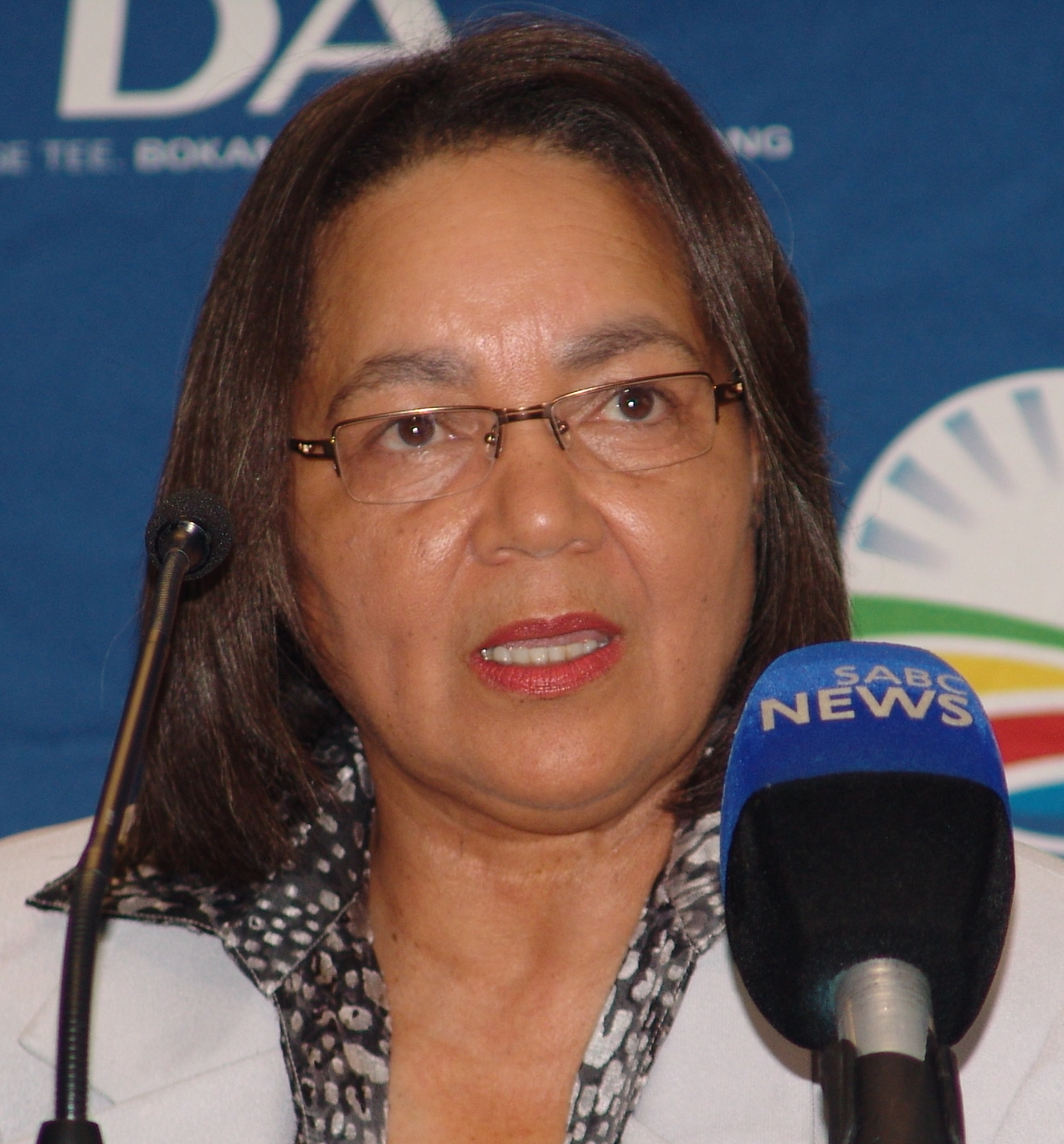

	First party	Second party	Third party
Leader	Jacob Zuma	Helen Zille	Mosiuoa Lekota
Party	ANC	DA	COPE
Last election	69.69%, 279 seats	12.37%, 50 seats	Did not exist
Seats won	264	67	30
Seat change	▼15	▲17	New party
Popular vote	11,650,748	2,945,829	1,311,027
Percentage	65.90%	16.66%	7.42%
Swing	▼3.79pp	▲4.29pp	New party
	Fourth party	Fifth party	Sixth party
Leader	Mangosuthu Buthelezi	Patricia de Lille	Bantu Holomisa
Party	IFP	ID	UDM
Last election	6.97%, 28 seats	1.73%, 7 seats	2.28%, 9 seats
Seats won	18	4	4
Seat change	▼10	▼3	▼5
Popular vote	804,260	162,915	149,680
Percentage	4.55%	0.92%	0.85%
Swing	▼2.42pp	▼0.81pp	▼1.43pp
President before election
Kgalema Motlanthe
ANC
Elected President
Jacob Zuma
ANC

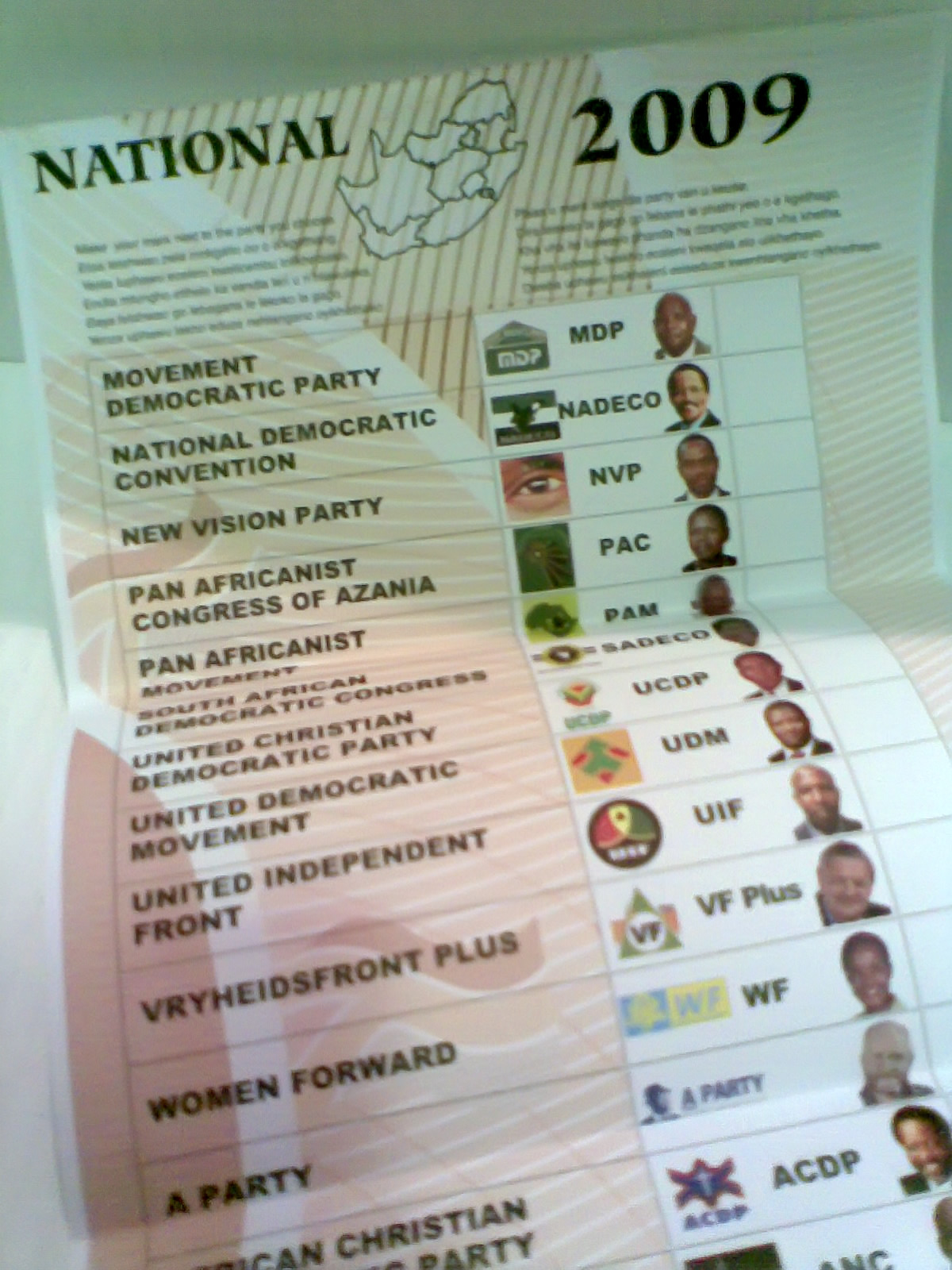
Election ballot.

General elections were held in South Africa on 22 April 2009 to elect members of the National Assembly and provincial legislatures. These were the fourth general elections held since the end of the apartheid era.

The North Gauteng High Court ruled on 9 February 2009 that South African citizens living abroad should be allowed to vote in elections. The judgment was confirmed by the Constitutional Court on 12 March 2009, when it decided that overseas voters who were already registered would be allowed to vote. Registered voters who found themselves outside their registered voting districts on election day were also permitted to vote for the national ballot at any voting station in South Africa.

The result was a victory for the ruling African National Congress (ANC), which won 264 of the 400 seats in the National Assembly, a fifteen seat reduction compared to the 2004 elections and losing its two-thirds supermajority. ANC leader Jacob Zuma became president.

== Background and campaign ==
=== African National Congress – ruling party ===
The African National Congress was the ruling party in parliament going into the 2009 elections, having won 69.69% of the vote at the 2004 elections. During its term in office a number of internal changes occurred, the primary one being the election of Jacob Zuma to the party presidency ahead of Thabo Mbeki at the 52nd National Conference of the African National Congress held on 18 December 2007. Zuma's victory in the election was partly due to the wide degree of support for him from the ANC Youth League, the South African Communist Party and the Congress of South African Trade Unions.

Subsequent to this, in 2008 Zuma's ongoing corruption trial in relation to a multi-billion Rand arms deal was dismissed by the courts, which insinuated that Mbeki had unduly influenced the investigation into Zuma. In light of the court's findings, the ANC's National Executive Committee asked Mbeki to resign as president of the country, which he duly did on 20 September 2008.

Mbeki was replaced by Kgalema Motlanthe, who had been elected as ANC deputy president at the 2007 conference. Motlanthe was not the presidential candidate of the ANC for the 2009 general election, but rather the current President of the ANC, Jacob Zuma. The ANC's electoral list was led by Zuma, followed by Motlanthe, Deputy President of South Africa Baleka Mbete, finance minister Trevor Manuel and Winnie Mandela, former wife of Nelson Mandela.

The recall of Mbeki, amongst other issues, created severe tensions and splits within the party, and eventually led to the formation of the Congress of the People, a new political party formed by former ANC members. Nevertheless, most pre-poll predictions gave the ANC between sixty and seventy per cent of the popular vote; even the lowest prediction, giving the ANC 47 per cent, still rendered it comfortably South Africa's most favoured political party.

=== Democratic Alliance – official opposition ===
The Democratic Alliance, South Africa's main opposition party, had undergone a leadership change, with Cape Town mayor and former anti-apartheid activist Helen Zille having succeeded long-serving Tony Leon in May 2007.

With a disproportionate focus on the Western Cape province, which it had identified as winnable, the DA launched its election campaign with the slogan "Vote to Win". It released its manifesto on 14 February.

The party was expected to perform strongly in the Western Cape, with analysts suggesting it would take control of the province from the ruling ANC. The ANC's support in the province was on the wane, while the DA had performed well in by-elections in the province leading up to the poll.

The party projected that it would govern in the Western Cape province – a task made easier by the ANC-COPE split – though it expected to need to form a governing coalition in order to do so. The party anticipated that it would take control of several other major cities and towns in the 2011 local elections, and, with what it termed a "realignment of SA politics", predicted it would take its "winning streak" into the 2014 elections, when it plans to challenge for the mantle of ruling party.

The DA's relationship with ANC breakaway party Cope started strongly. Cope leader Mosiuoa Lekota showed a willingness to co-operate with Zille in the future. Subsequently, Zille criticised COPE's internal structures and suggested many of the party's new members were merely Mbeki loyalists hoping to resurrect defunct political careers.

In the closing stages of the DA's campaign, it launched its "Stop Zuma" drive, which came under considerable criticism in the press—political analysts dubbing the tactic an example of "negative" politics. Zille later retorted, however, that what was really negative was the idea of handing over the right to change the Constitution unilaterally to Jacob Zuma and his "closed, crony network", as they would abuse that right both to enrich themselves and to protect themselves from prosecution. She later claimed the decline in the ANC's support base and the concomitant increase in that of her own party was a result of the DA 'Stop Zuma' campaign.

== Electoral system ==
The 400 members of the National Assembly were elected by closed list proportional representation; two hundred members were elected from national party lists and 200 from provincial party lists in each of the nine provinces. The President of South Africa was chosen by the National Assembly after the election; in 2009, the presidential election was held on 6 May. The premiers of each province are chosen by the winning majority in each provincial legislature.

== Boycott ==
A number of communities, organisations, social movements and well-known personalities threatened not to vote in the 2009 elections. The most well-known personality was Archbishop Desmond Tutu who at first said he would not vote but then changed his mind. South Africa's Poor People's Alliance, the Anti-Privatisation Forum, NOPE, and the independent farmworkers' union Sikhula Sonke resolved to boycott the election under the banner No Land! No House! No Vote!.

== Results ==

Most popular party in each ward, depicted as a map (top), and as a cartogram in which size is proportional to the number of votes cast (bottom).

African National Congress
Democratic Alliance
Congress of the People
Inkatha Freedom Party
Independent Democrats
United Democratic Movement

The darker shade indicates a majority, while the lighter shade indicates a non-majority plurality.

Map showing, for each municipality, the percentage point change in the ANC's share of the vote since the 2004 election 37.5–50 pp to the ANC 25–37.5 pp to the ANC 12.5–25 pp to the ANC 0–12.5 pp to the ANC 0–12.5 pp away from the ANC 12.5–25 pp away from the ANC 25–37.5 pp away from the ANC 37.5–50 pp away from the ANC

The ANC, which has been in power since 1994, obtained 65.90% of valid votes cast on the national ballot, making it just shy of being able to change the constitution. The DA retained its position as the official opposition and also won the election in the Western Cape province with an outright majority.

Some 23-million people were registered for the 2009 general elections, which was about 2.5 million more than in 2004. There was a 77.3% turnout of registered voters, 1.34% of whom spoiled their ballots rendering them invalid. About 12-million people eligible to vote either did not register to vote (about 7-million), or did register but did not vote (5.4 million). In this election, there was a slight decrease in voter abstention though there was at least one high-profile election and registration boycotts campaign, the No Land! No House! No Vote! Campaign.

The Independent Electoral Commission made results available on their website as they were received from voting districts, filtered by national, provincial, municipality, and voting district.

=== National Assembly ===
Party	Votes	%	Seats	+/–
African National Congress	11,650,748	65.90	264	−15
Democratic Alliance	2,945,829	16.66	67	+17
Congress of the People	1,311,027	7.42	30	New
Inkatha Freedom Party	804,260	4.55	18	−10
Independent Democrats	162,915	0.92	4	−3
United Democratic Movement	149,680	0.85	4	−5
Freedom Front Plus	146,796	0.83	4	0
African Christian Democratic Party	142,658	0.81	3	−4
United Christian Democratic Party	66,086	0.37	2	−1
Pan Africanist Congress	48,530	0.27	1	−2
Minority Front	43,474	0.25	1	−1
Azanian People's Organisation	38,245	0.22	1	0
African People's Convention	35,867	0.20	1	New
Movement Democratic Party	29,747	0.17	0	New
Al Jama-ah	25,947	0.15	0	New
Christian Democratic Alliance	11,638	0.07	0	0
National Democratic Convention	10,830	0.06	0	New
New Vision Party	9,296	0.05	0	New
United Independent Front	8,872	0.05	0	New
Great Kongress of South Africa	8,271	0.05	0	New
South African Democratic Congress	6,035	0.03	0	New
Keep It Straight and Simple Party	5,440	0.03	0	0
Pan Africanist Movement	5,426	0.03	0	New
Alliance of Free Democrats	5,178	0.03	0	New
Women Forward	5,087	0.03	0	New
A Party	2,847	0.02	0	New
**Total**	**17,680,729**	**100.00**	**400**	**0**
Valid votes	17,680,729	98.66		
Invalid/blank votes	239,237	1.34		
Total votes	**17,919,966**	**100.00**		
Registered voters/turnout	23,181,997	77.30		
Source: Election Resources

=== Provincial legislatures ===
The following table summarises the results of the elections to the provincial legislatures. The majority party in each province is indicated in bold.

Party	EC	FS	G	KZN	L	M	NW	NC	WC
African National Congress	**44**	**22**	**47**	**51**	**43**	**27**	**25**	**19**	14
Democratic Alliance	6	3	16	7	2	2	3	4	**22**
Congress of the People	9	4	6	1	4	1	3	5	3
Inkatha Freedom Party			1	18					
Independent Democrats			1					2	2
African Christian Democratic Party			1	1					1
United Democratic Movement	3								
Freedom Front Plus		1	1						
Minority Front				2					
United Christian Democratic Party							2		
African Independent Congress	1								
Total	63	30	73	80	49	30	33	30	42

==== Eastern Cape ====
Party	Votes	%	Seats	+/–
African National Congress	1,552,676	68.82	44	−7
Congress of the People	308,439	13.67	9	New
Democratic Alliance	225,310	9.99	6	+1
United Democratic Movement	93,196	4.13	3	−3
African Independent Congress	17,306	0.77	1	New
Pan Africanist Congress	12,108	0.54	0	−1
African Christian Democratic Party	11,974	0.53	0	0
Independent Democrats	10,466	0.46	0	0
Azanian People's Organisation	4,598	0.20	0	0
African People's Convention	4,517	0.20	0	New
Freedom Front Plus	4,428	0.20	0	0
Inkatha Freedom Party	2,270	0.10	0	0
National Democratic Convention	2,027	0.09	0	New
Pan Africanist Movement	1,921	0.09	0	New
United Christian Democratic Party	1,908	0.08	0	0
Christian Democratic Alliance	1,663	0.07	0	New
New Vision Party	1,281	0.06	0	New
**Total**	**2,256,088**	**100.00**	**63**	**0**
Valid votes	2,256,088	98.59		
Invalid/blank votes	32,299	1.41		
Total votes	**2,288,387**	**100.00**		
Registered voters/turnout	3,056,559	74.87		
Source: Election Resources

==== Free State ====
Party	Votes	%	Seats	+/–
African National Congress	734,688	71.10	22	−3
Congress of the People	120,018	11.61	4	New
Democratic Alliance	119,844	11.60	3	0
Freedom Front Plus	20,780	2.01	1	0
Dikwankwetla Party	11,257	1.09	0	0
African Christian Democratic Party	7,556	0.73	0	−1
United Democratic Movement	3,722	0.36	0	0
United Christian Democratic Party	3,459	0.33	0	0
Pan Africanist Congress	3,449	0.33	0	0
African People's Convention	3,200	0.31	0	New
Inkatha Freedom Party	2,232	0.22	0	0
Independent Democrats	1,654	0.16	0	0
National Democratic Convention	1,065	0.10	0	New
Peace and Justice Congress	398	0.04	0	New
**Total**	**1,033,322**	**100.00**	**30**	**0**
Valid votes	1,033,322	98.50		
Invalid/blank votes	15,744	1.50		
Total votes	**1,049,066**	**100.00**		
Registered voters/turnout	1,388,588	75.55		
Source: Election Resources

==== Gauteng ====
Party	Votes	%	Seats	+/–
African National Congress	2,662,013	64.04	47	−4
Democratic Alliance	908,616	21.86	16	+1
Congress of the People	323,327	7.78	6	New
Freedom Front Plus	67,660	1.63	1	0
Inkatha Freedom Party	61,856	1.49	1	−1
African Christian Democratic Party	36,099	0.87	1	0
Independent Democrats	25,243	0.61	1	0
United Democratic Movement	16,480	0.40	0	−1
Pan Africanist Congress	12,880	0.31	0	−1
United Christian Democratic Party	10,091	0.24	0	0
Azanian People's Organisation	8,927	0.21	0	0
Movement Democratic Party	5,731	0.14	0	New
African People's Convention	5,123	0.12	0	New
Christian Democratic Alliance	2,901	0.07	0	0
African Christian Alliance	2,541	0.06	0	New
Women Forward	1,974	0.05	0	New
Great Kongress of South Africa	1,909	0.05	0	New
National Democratic Convention	1,497	0.04	0	New
Alliance of Free Democrats	1,101	0.03	0	New
New Vision Party	1,079	0.03	0	New
**Total**	**4,157,048**	**100.00**	**73**	**0**
Valid votes	4,157,048	98.98		
Invalid/blank votes	42,815	1.02		
Total votes	**4,199,863**	**100.00**		
Registered voters/turnout	5,555,159	75.60		
Source: Election Resources

==== KwaZulu-Natal ====
Party	Votes	%	Seats	+/–
African National Congress	2,192,516	62.95	51	+13
Inkatha Freedom Party	780,027	22.40	18	−12
Democratic Alliance	318,559	9.15	7	0
Minority Front	71,507	2.05	2	0
Congress of the People	44,890	1.29	1	New
African Christian Democratic Party	23,537	0.68	1	−1
United Democratic Movement	7,953	0.23	0	−1
Al Jama-ah	7,612	0.22	0	New
National Democratic Convention	6,881	0.20	0	New
Independent Democrats	6,853	0.20	0	0
Freedom Front Plus	5,760	0.17	0	0
African People's Convention	5,087	0.15	0	New
South African Democratic Congress	3,883	0.11	0	New
Pan Africanist Congress	2,578	0.07	0	0
Women Forward	1,816	0.05	0	New
United Christian Democratic Party	1,798	0.05	0	0
Great Kongress of South Africa	1,730	0.05	0	New
**Total**	**3,482,987**	**100.00**	**80**	**0**
Valid votes	3,482,987	98.76		
Invalid/blank votes	43,713	1.24		
Total votes	**3,526,700**	**100.00**		
Registered voters/turnout	4,475,217	78.81		
Source: Election Resources

==== Limpopo ====
Party	Votes	%	Seats	+/–
African National Congress	1,265,631	84.88	43	−2
Congress of the People	112,325	7.53	4	New
Democratic Alliance	51,856	3.48	2	0
African Christian Democratic Party	10,246	0.69	0	−1
Freedom Front Plus	9,035	0.61	0	0
Pan Africanist Congress	7,934	0.53	0	0
New Vision Party	6,497	0.44	0	New
Azanian People's Organisation	5,640	0.38	0	0
United Democratic Movement	5,193	0.35	0	−1
African People's Convention	4,455	0.30	0	New
Ximoko Party	3,452	0.23	0	0
United Independent Front	1,769	0.12	0	New
Black Consciousness Party	1,432	0.10	0	New
Independent Democrats	1,333	0.09	0	0
United Christian Democratic Party	1,320	0.09	0	0
Alliance of Free Democrats	1,041	0.07	0	New
Women Forward	977	0.07	0	New
Inkatha Freedom Party	936	0.06	0	New
**Total**	**1,491,072**	**100.00**	**49**	**0**
Valid votes	1,491,072	98.51		
Invalid/blank votes	22,549	1.49		
Total votes	**1,513,621**	**100.00**		
Registered voters/turnout	2,256,073	67.09		
Source: Election Resources

==== Mpumalanga ====
Party	Votes	%	Seats	+/–
African National Congress	1,110,190	85.55	27	0
Democratic Alliance	97,204	7.49	2	0
Congress of the People	37,789	2.91	1	New
Freedom Front Plus	11,590	0.89	0	−1
African Christian Democratic Party	6,565	0.51	0	0
Inkatha Freedom Party	6,540	0.50	0	0
Sindawonye Progressive Party	6,423	0.49	0	0
African People's Convention	4,834	0.37	0	New
Pan Africanist Congress	4,097	0.32	0	0
United Democratic Movement	3,366	0.26	0	0
Azanian People's Organisation	2,928	0.23	0	0
Christian Party	2,435	0.19	0	New
Independent Democrats	1,527	0.12	0	0
National Democratic Convention	1,374	0.11	0	New
United Christian Democratic Party	913	0.07	0	0
**Total**	**1,297,775**	**100.00**	**30**	**0**
Valid votes	1,297,775	98.55		
Invalid/blank votes	19,119	1.45		
Total votes	**1,316,894**	**100.00**		
Registered voters/turnout	1,696,705	77.61		
Source: Election Resources

==== North West ====
Party	Votes	%	Seats	+/–
African National Congress	783,794	72.89	25	−2
Congress of the People	89,573	8.33	3	New
Democratic Alliance	88,728	8.25	3	+1
United Christian Democratic Party	56,678	5.27	2	−1
Freedom Front Plus	19,463	1.81	0	−1
African Christian Democratic Party	7,366	0.69	0	0
United Democratic Movement	5,467	0.51	0	0
Independent Democrats	4,984	0.46	0	0
Movement Democratic Party	4,432	0.41	0	New
African People's Convention	3,116	0.29	0	New
Pan Africanist Congress	2,831	0.26	0	0
Azanian People's Organisation	2,712	0.25	0	0
South African Political Party	1,832	0.17	0	New
African Christian Alliance	1,750	0.16	0	New
Inkatha Freedom Party	1,619	0.15	0	0
National Democratic Convention	978	0.09	0	New
**Total**	**1,075,323**	**100.00**	**33**	**0**
Valid votes	1,075,323	98.08		
Invalid/blank votes	21,007	1.92		
Total votes	**1,096,330**	**100.00**		
Registered voters/turnout	1,564,357	70.08		
Source: Election Resources

==== Northern Cape ====
Party	Votes	%	Seats	+/–
African National Congress	245,699	60.75	19	−2
Congress of the People	67,416	16.67	5	New
Democratic Alliance	50,817	12.57	4	+1
Independent Democrats	19,995	4.94	2	0
Freedom Front Plus	5,034	1.24	0	−1
United Christian Democratic Party	4,889	1.21	0	0
African Christian Democratic Party	4,041	1.00	0	−1
Azanian People's Organisation	2,439	0.60	0	0
African People's Convention	1,364	0.34	0	New
Pan Africanist Congress	882	0.22	0	0
Inkatha Freedom Party	757	0.19	0	0
United Democratic Movement	604	0.15	0	0
Christian Democratic Alliance	481	0.12	0	New
**Total**	**404,418**	**100.00**	**30**	**0**
Valid votes	404,418	98.49		
Invalid/blank votes	6,190	1.51		
Total votes	**410,608**	**100.00**		
Registered voters/turnout	554,900	74.00		
Source: Election Resources

==== Western Cape ====
Party	Votes	%	Seats	+/–
Democratic Alliance	1,012,568	51.46	22	+10
African National Congress	620,918	31.55	14	−5
Congress of the People	152,356	7.74	3	New
Independent Democrats	92,116	4.68	2	−1
African Christian Democratic Party	28,995	1.47	1	−1
United Democratic Movement	14,013	0.71	0	−1
Al Jama-ah	9,039	0.46	0	New
Freedom Front Plus	8,384	0.43	0	0
Pan Africanist Congress	4,467	0.23	0	0
Africa Muslim Party	4,333	0.22	0	0
Christian Democratic Alliance	3,987	0.20	0	0
National Party South Africa	3,378	0.17	0	New
Cape Party	2,552	0.13	0	New
National Alliance	1,996	0.10	0	New
African People's Convention	1,778	0.09	0	New
United Christian Democratic Party	1,552	0.08	0	0
Azanian People's Organisation	1,291	0.07	0	0
United Independent Front	1,178	0.06	0	New
Inkatha Freedom Party	1,158	0.06	0	0
Peace and Justice Congress	630	0.03	0	0
Universal Party	599	0.03	0	0
National Democratic Convention	463	0.02	0	New
**Total**	**1,967,751**	**100.00**	**42**	**0**
Valid votes	1,967,751	98.99		
Invalid/blank votes	20,026	1.01		
Total votes	**1,987,777**	**100.00**		
Registered voters/turnout	2,634,439	75.45		
Source: Election Resources

=== NCOP seats ===
The National Council of Provinces (NCOP) consists of 90 members, ten elected by each provincial legislature. The Members of NCOP have to be elected in proportion to the party membership of the provincial legislature.

Party	Delegate type	Province									Total	
Party	Delegate type	EC	FS	G	KZN	L	M	NW	NC	WC	Total	
African National Congress	Permanent	4	4	4	4	5	5	4	3	2	35	62
African National Congress	Special	3	3	3	3	4	4	3	3	1	27	62
Democratic Alliance	Permanent	1	1	1	1		1	1	1	3	10	13
Democratic Alliance	Special			1						2	3	13
Congress of the People	Permanent	1	1	1		1		1	1	1	7	8
Congress of the People	Special								1		1	8
Independent Democrats	Permanent								1		1	2
Independent Democrats	Special									1	1	2
Inkatha Freedom Party	Permanent				1						1	2
Inkatha Freedom Party	Special				1						1	2
Freedom Front Plus	Special		1								1	
United Christian Democratic Party	Special							1			1	
United Democratic Movement	Special	1									1	
Total		10	10	10	10	10	10	10	10	10	90	

== Aftermath ==
The ANC received widespread congratulations for its decisive national victory, both from international and domestic sources. This included the opposition, with DA leader Helen Zille acknowledging that the people had given it a strong mandate to rule. "We trust that the ANC will not abuse this confidence, and will govern well and in the interests of all South Africans." However, with 65.9% of the vote and 264 seats in the National Assembly (down from 74.3% and 297 seats), the ANC no longer had the two-thirds majority it needed to change the Constitution unilaterally. The governing party had lost considerable support in 8 of the 9 provinces, partially compensated for by a big increase in KwaZulu-Natal at the expense of the IFP.

Thanking supporters the following week, DA leader Helen Zille related proudly that her party had achieved all three of its primary objectives: it had kept the ANC below a two-thirds majority (albeit only just), won an outright majority in the Western Cape and significantly improved its standing in parliament. Zille saw the results as a vindication of the party's statement at the beginning of its campaign that the only two genuine political forces in South Africa were the DA and the ANC, with the latter losing support while the former consistently gained it, and voters refusing to waste their ballots on small, insignificant parties.

== See also ==
- African National Congress candidates for the 2009 South African general election
- List of political parties in South Africa
- 2011 South African municipal election
- 25th South African Parliament
