= National Democratic Convention (South Africa) =

Political party in South Africa

National Democratic Convention (NADECO)
- Leader: Rev. Hawu Mbatha
- Founder: Ziba Jiyane
- Founded: September 2005
- Dissolved: c. 2009
- Headquarters: 1615 Commercial City, 40 Commercial Road, Durban
- Youth wing: National Democratic Youth Convention
- Women's wing: National Democratic Youth Convention
- Ideology: Conservatism; Federalism
- Political position: Right-wing
- Colours: Green; Black; White

Party flag

Website
- http://www.nadeco.org

The National Democratic Convention (Nadeco) was a South African political party formed in August 2005 via floor crossing legislation by Ziba Jiyane, the former Inkatha Freedom Party (IFP) chairperson.

In September 2005 the provincial African Christian Democratic Party leader and MP Reverend Hawu Mbatha joined Nadeco. Ziba Jiyane left the IFP after a public feud with IFP President Mangosuthu Buthelezi over the direction of the IFP. Jiyane claimed that the IFP was not adequately democratic. Jiyane was suspended by the IFP leadership and resigned, forming Nadeco.

During the 2005 floor-crossing window a number of politicians including Gavin Woods joined the new party, leaving it with four seats in the national assembly, and four in the Kwazulu-Natal assembly.

In August 2006, however, Jiyane was suspended by the party for misconduct. After a protracted legal dispute with Mbatha, he formally split from the party in December 2007 and retired temporarily from politics, later forming the South African Democratic Congress in 2008.

Nadeco lost all of its national and provincial seats in the 2009 general election and subsequently disbanded.

== Election results ==
Election	Votes	%	Seats
2009	10,830	0.06	0
